= 2003 NASCAR Winston Cup Series =

American motorsport season

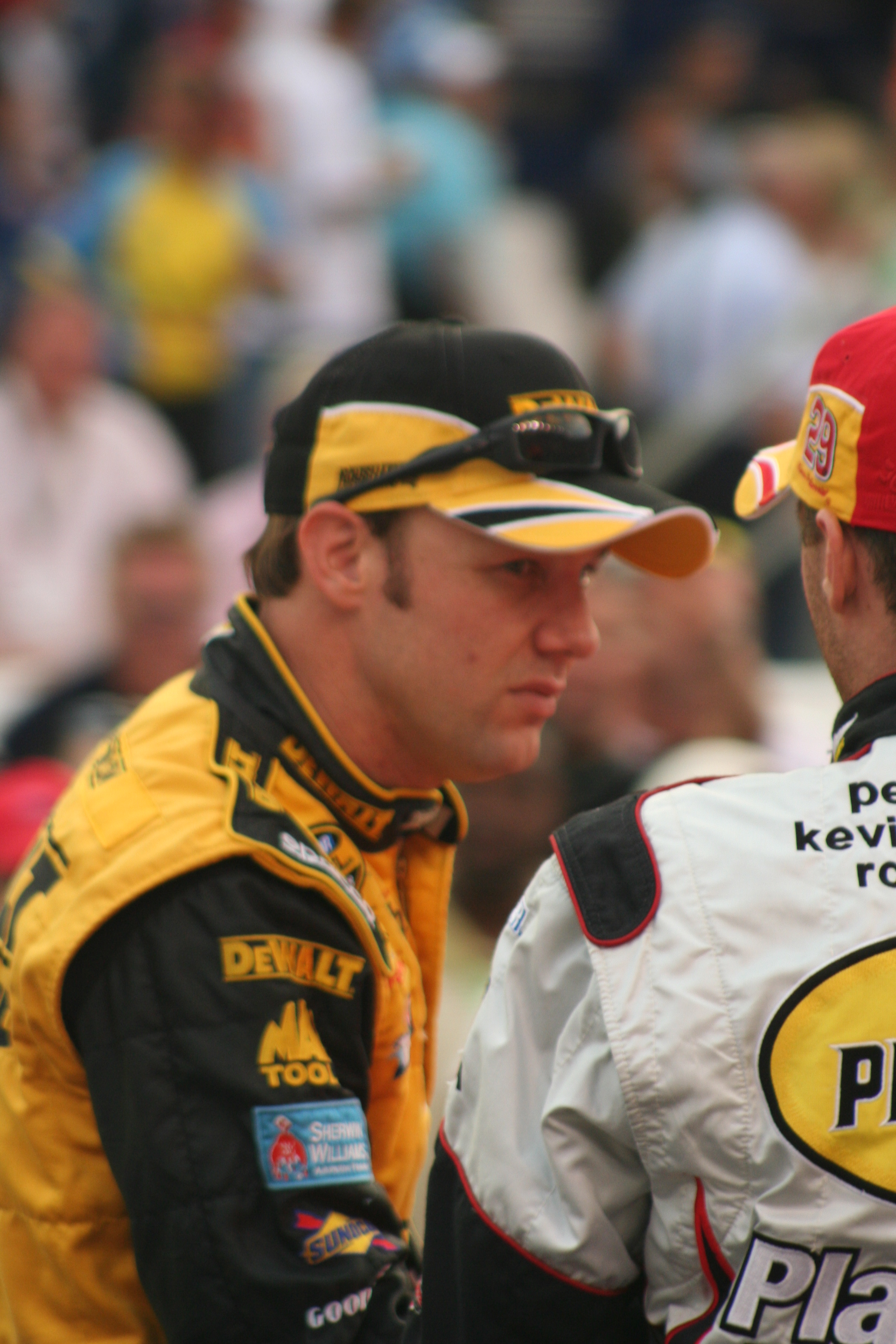
Matt Kenseth, the 2003 NASCAR Winston Cup Series champion.

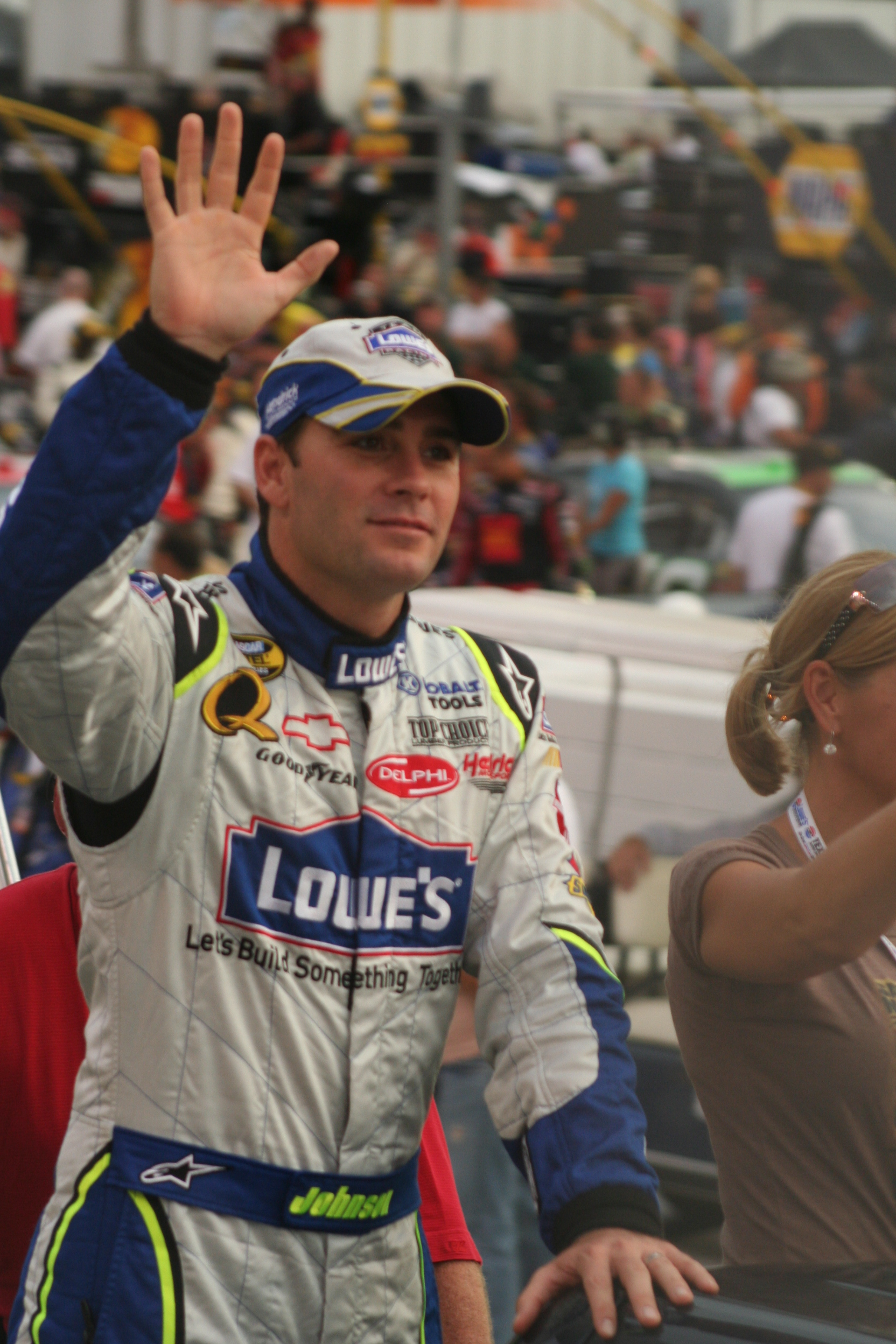
Jimmie Johnson came in second behind Kenseth by 90 points.

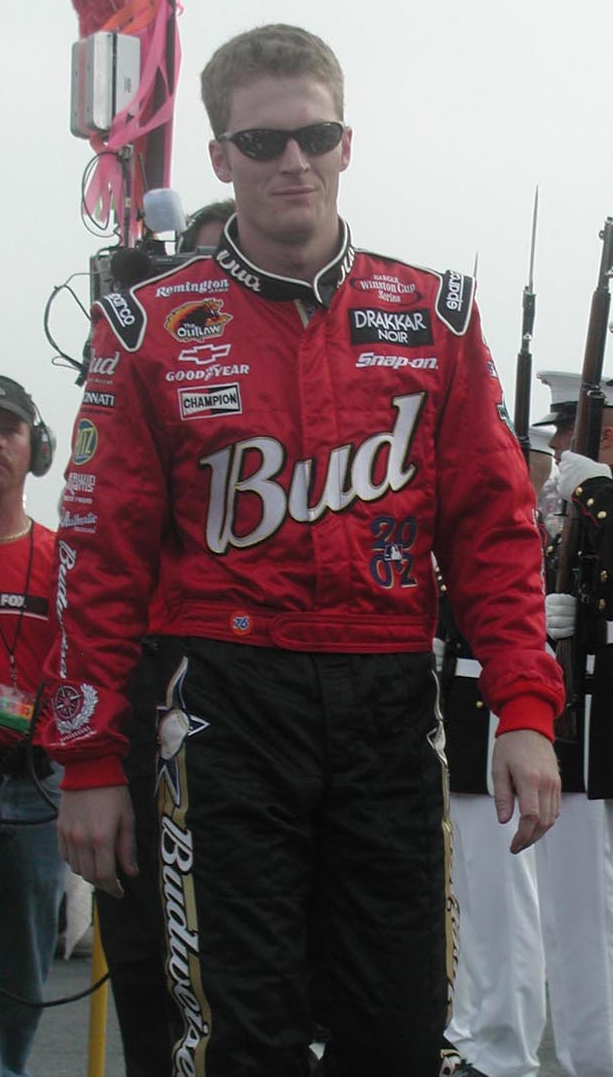
Dale Earnhardt Jr. finished third in the championship.

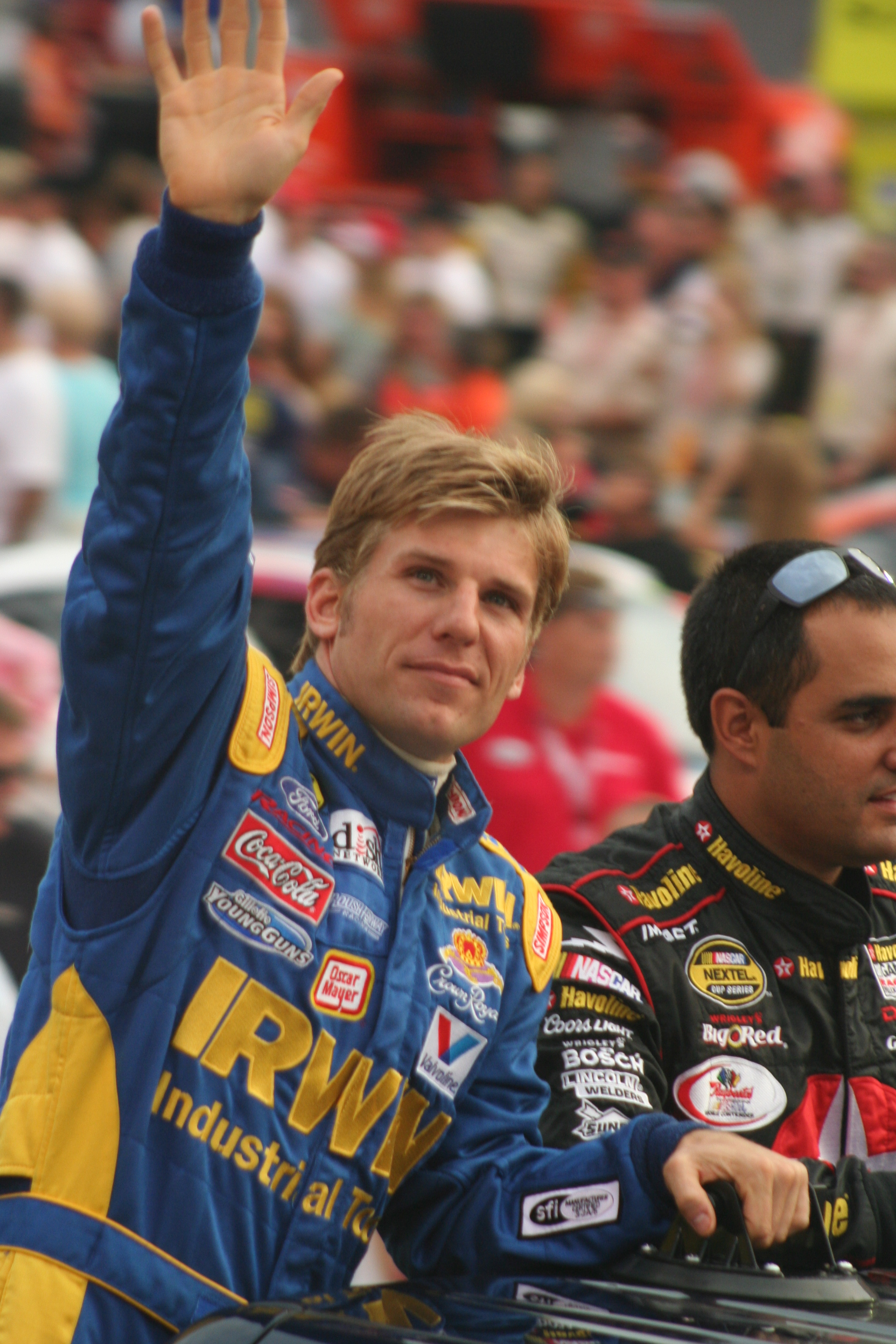
Jamie McMurray, the 2003 NASCAR Rookie of the Year.

The 2003 NASCAR Winston Cup Series was the 55th season of professional stock car racing in the United States and the 32nd modern-era Cup Series season. The season began on February 8 at the Daytona International Speedway with the Budweiser Shootout and ended on November 16 at Homestead–Miami Speedway with the Ford 400. Despite only winning one race throughout the whole season, Matt Kenseth, driving the No.17 Ford for Roush Racing, was strongly consistent following the lone win, and was crowned the Winston Cup champion. His only win came in the third race of the 36 race season. Chevrolet took home the NASCAR Manufacturers' Championship after capturing 19 wins and 264 points over second-place finisher Dodge, who had nine wins and 203 points. Ford finished the year third with seven wins and 200 points, and Pontiac finished fourth with one win and 125 points.

This was the final year for Winston being the title sponsor of the Cup Series. Winston had been the title sponsor for NASCAR since 1971. After 33 years, Winston decided not to renew its sponsorship. NASCAR went to work to find a sponsor immediately, and on June 19, 2003, NASCAR announced that the telecommunications firm Nextel would be the new title sponsor of the Cup Series starting in 2004. This was also the final season for Unocal 76 Brand as the official fuel for NASCAR. Unocal had been the official fuel since the sport's inception in 1948. Sunoco would replace Unocal 76 as the official fuel of NASCAR. This was also the last full-time season for Pontiac. Pontiac had been with NASCAR on 2 different occasions. The first was from 1949 to 1964, then they returned in 1981 and continued full-time until the end of 2003, though a few teams ran Pontiacs on a limited basis in 2004, and they continued running in the Busch Series through 2005 and ARCA as late as 2007. Pontiac folded entirely in 2009 when parent company General Motors shuttered it during their chapter 11 bankruptcy restructuring.

In addition, NASCAR instituted a new points system after this season entitled the Chase for the Cup, in which after 26 races, all the points standings in the top ten as well as any position within 400 points of the lead, would be reset, so the drivers in those positions would be eligible for the championship. This was done primarily because of the huge lead Kenseth accumulated during 2003 despite winning one race.

== Teams and drivers ==
=== Complete schedule ===
Manufacturer	Team	No.	Driver	Crew chief
Chevrolet	BACE Motorsports	74	Tony Raines (R)	Larry Carter
Chevrolet	Dale Earnhardt, Inc.	1	Steve Park 11	Tony Gibson
Chevrolet	Dale Earnhardt, Inc.	1	Jeff Green 12	Tony Gibson
Chevrolet	Dale Earnhardt, Inc.	1	Ron Fellows 2	Tony Gibson
Chevrolet	Dale Earnhardt, Inc.	1	John Andretti 10	Tony Gibson
Chevrolet	Dale Earnhardt, Inc.	1	Jason Keller 1	Tony Gibson
Chevrolet	Dale Earnhardt, Inc.	8	Dale Earnhardt Jr.	Tony Eury 33; Tony Eury Jr. 3
Chevrolet	Dale Earnhardt, Inc.	15	Michael Waltrip	Slugger Labbe
Chevrolet	Hendrick Motorsports	5	Terry Labonte	Jim Long
Chevrolet	Hendrick Motorsports	24	Jeff Gordon	Robbie Loomis
Chevrolet	Hendrick Motorsports	25	Joe Nemechek 32	Peter Sospenzo
Chevrolet	Hendrick Motorsports	25	Brian Vickers 4	Peter Sospenzo
Chevrolet	Hendrick Motorsports	48	Jimmie Johnson	Chad Knaus
Chevrolet	Joe Gibbs Racing	18	Bobby Labonte	Michael "Fatback" McSwain
Chevrolet	Joe Gibbs Racing	20	Tony Stewart	Greg Zipadelli
Chevrolet	Richard Childress Racing	29	Kevin Harvick	Todd Berrier
Chevrolet	Richard Childress Racing	30	Jeff Green 11	Mike Beam
Chevrolet	Richard Childress Racing	30	Steve Park 25	Mike Beam
Chevrolet	Richard Childress Racing	31	Robby Gordon	Kevin Hamlin
Dodge	A. J. Foyt Racing	14; 50	Larry Foyt 33 (R)	Ben Holm
Dodge	A. J. Foyt Racing	14; 50	P. J. Jones 1	Ben Holm
Dodge	A. J. Foyt Racing	14; 50	Mark Green 2	Ben Holm
Dodge	BAM Racing	49	Ken Schrader	Scott Eggleston
Dodge	Bill Davis Racing	22	Ward Burton 32	Frank Stoddard
Dodge	Bill Davis Racing	22	Scott Wimmer 4	Frank Stoddard
Dodge	Bill Davis Racing	23	Kenny Wallace	Phillipe Lopez
Dodge	Chip Ganassi Racing	40	Sterling Marlin	Lee McCall
Dodge	Chip Ganassi Racing	41	Casey Mears (R)	Jimmy Elledge
Dodge	Chip Ganassi Racing	42	Jamie McMurray (R)	Donnie Wingo
Dodge	Evernham Motorsports	9	Bill Elliott	Mike Ford
Dodge	Evernham Motorsports	19	Jeremy Mayfield	Kenny Francis
Dodge	Penske Racing	2	Rusty Wallace	Bill Wilburn
Dodge	Penske Racing	12	Ryan Newman	Matt Borland
Dodge	Petty Enterprises	43	John Andretti 14	Gary Putnam
Dodge	Petty Enterprises	43	Christian Fittipaldi (R) 11	Gary Putnam
Dodge	Petty Enterprises	43	Shane Hmiel 1	Gary Putnam
Dodge	Petty Enterprises	43	Scott Maxwell 1	Gary Putnam
Dodge	Petty Enterprises	43	Jeff Green 9	Gary Putnam
Dodge	Petty Enterprises	45	Kyle Petty 35	Greg Steadman
Dodge	Petty Enterprises	45	Christian Fittipaldi (R) 1	Greg Steadman
Dodge	Ultra Motorsports	7	Jimmy Spencer 35	Tommy Baldwin Jr.
Dodge	Ultra Motorsports	7	Ted Musgrave 1	Tommy Baldwin Jr.
Ford	BelCar Motorsports	54	Todd Bodine	Gary Cogswell
Ford	Jasper Motorsports	77	Dave Blaney	Mark Harrah
Ford	Robert Yates Racing	38	Elliott Sadler	Raymond Fox Jr.
Ford	Robert Yates Racing	88	Dale Jarrett	Shawn Parker
Ford	Roush Racing	6	Mark Martin	Pat Tryson
Ford	Roush Racing	16	Greg Biffle (R)	Doug Richert
Ford	Roush Racing	17	Matt Kenseth	Robbie Reiser
Ford	Roush Racing	97	Kurt Busch	Jimmy Fennig
Ford	Roush Racing	99	Jeff Burton	Paul Andrews
Ford	Wood Brothers Racing	21	Ricky Rudd	Ben Leslie
Pontiac	Haas CNC Racing	0	Jack Sprague (R) 18	Tony Furr
Pontiac	Haas CNC Racing	0	John Andretti 3	Tony Furr
Pontiac	Haas CNC Racing	0	Jason Leffler 11	Tony Furr
Pontiac	Haas CNC Racing	0	Ward Burton 4	Tony Furr
Pontiac	MB2 Motorsports	01	Jerry Nadeau 10	Ryan Pemberton
Pontiac	MB2 Motorsports	01	Jason Keller 1	Ryan Pemberton
Pontiac	MB2 Motorsports	01	Mike Wallace 8	Ryan Pemberton
Pontiac	MB2 Motorsports	01	Boris Said 2	Ryan Pemberton
Pontiac	MB2 Motorsports	01	Mike Skinner 11	Ryan Pemberton
Pontiac	MB2 Motorsports	01	Joe Nemechek 4	Ryan Pemberton
Pontiac	MB2 Motorsports	10	Johnny Benson	Jay Guy
Pontiac	Morgan-McClure Motorsports	4	Mike Skinner 15	Tim Brewer
Pontiac	Morgan-McClure Motorsports	4	Johnny Miller 1	Tim Brewer
Pontiac	Morgan-McClure Motorsports	4	Stacy Compton 2	Tim Brewer
Pontiac	Morgan-McClure Motorsports	4	Johnny Sauter (R) 6	Tim Brewer
Pontiac	Morgan-McClure Motorsports	4	Brett Bodine 1	Tim Brewer
Pontiac	Morgan-McClure Motorsports	4	Robert Pressley 1	Tim Brewer
Pontiac	Morgan-McClure Motorsports	4	P. J. Jones 1	Tim Brewer
Pontiac	Morgan-McClure Motorsports	4	Kevin Lepage 9	Tim Brewer
Pontiac	PPI Motorsports	32	Ricky Craven	Scott Miller

=== Limited schedule ===
Manufacturer	Team	No.	Race driver	Crew chief	Round(s)
Chevrolet	Andy Petree Racing	33	Christian Fittipaldi	Newt Moore	1
Chevrolet	Andy Petree Racing	33	Paul Menard	Newt Moore	2
Chevrolet	BC Motorsports	78	Mike Harmon		1
Chevrolet	Bill McAnally Racing	00	Jim Inglebright		1
Chevrolet	Michael Waltrip Racing	00	Buckshot Jones	Bobby Kennedy	2
Chevrolet	Michael Waltrip Racing	00	Mike Skinner	Bobby Kennedy	1
Chevrolet	Dale Earnhardt, Inc.	81	Jason Keller		1
Chevrolet	Dale Earnhardt, Inc.	81	John Andretti		1
Chevrolet	FitzBradshaw Racing	83	Kerry Earnhardt	Bobby Temple	3
Chevrolet	Hendrick Motorsports	60	David Green	Gary DeHart	4
Chevrolet	Hendrick Motorsports	60	Brian Vickers	Gary DeHart	1
Chevrolet	Hendrick Motorsports	60	Kyle Busch	Gary DeHart	1
Chevrolet	Joe Gibbs Racing	80	Mike Bliss	Jimmy Makar	2
Chevrolet	Joe Varde Racing	35	Joe Varde		1
Chevrolet	Marcis Auto Racing	71	Tim Sauter		3
Chevrolet	Marcis Auto Racing	71	Jim Sauter		1
Chevrolet	Mike Starr Racing	75	David Starr		1
Chevrolet	Quest Motor Racing	37	Derrike Cope	Ernie Cope	26
Chevrolet	Richard Childress Racing	90	John Andretti	Bobby Leslie	1
Chevrolet	Richard Childress Racing	90	Ron Hornaday Jr.		1
Dodge	Conely Racing	78	Rich Bickle		1
Dodge	Conely Racing	79	Billy Bigley		5
Dodge	Conely Racing	79	Rich Bickle		1
Dodge	Arnold Motorsports	79	Derrike Cope		1
Dodge	Bill Davis Racing	27	Scott Wimmer		3
Dodge	Bill Davis Racing	27	Shelby Howard		1
Dodge	Chip Ganassi Racing	39	Scott Pruett	Matt Chambers	1
Dodge	Evernham Motorsports	91	Casey Atwood	Sammy Johns	2
Dodge	Glenn Racing	46	Carl Long		2
Dodge	Petty Enterprises	44	Christian Fittipaldi (R)	Greg Steadman	5
Dodge	Phoenix Racing	09	Mike Wallace	Marc Reno	8
Dodge	Phoenix Racing	09	Scott Pruett	Marc Reno	1
Dodge	Phoenix Racing	09	Buckshot Jones	Marc Reno	1
Dodge	Ultra Motorsports	07	Ted Musgrave		2
Ford
Ford	Ash Motorsports	02	Brandon Ash		3
Ford	BelCar Racing	66	Hideo Fukuyama	Gary Cogswell	4
Ford	Brett Bodine Racing	11	Brett Bodine	Mike Hillman	9
Ford	Brett Bodine Racing	11	Geoff Bodine	Mike Hillman	1
Ford	CLR Racing	57	Jeff Fultz	Joey Cudmore	1
Ford	CLR Racing	57	Brett Bodine	Joey Cudmore	1
Ford	CLR Racing	57	Kevin Lepage	Joey Cudmore	2
Ford	Donlavey Racing	90	Kirk Shelmerdine		1
Ford	Harrah Racing	55	Jeff Fultz		1
Ford	Matrix Motorsports	71	Kevin Lepage		1
Ford	Robert Yates Racing	98	Jason Jarrett		1
Ford	Shepherd Racing Ventures	89	Morgan Shepherd		7
Ford	Team Rensi Motorsports	35	Bobby Hamilton Jr.		3
Pontiac	Morgan-McClure Motorsports	04	David Reutimann	Garth Finley	2
Pontiac	Morgan-McClure Motorsports	04	Johnny Miller	Garth Finley	1
Chevrolet Pontiac	SCORE Motorsports	02	Hermie Sadler	Jeff Buckner	19

== Schedule ==
No.	Race title	Track	Date
	Budweiser Shootout	Daytona International Speedway, Daytona Beach	February 8
	Gatorade 125s	Daytona International Speedway, Daytona Beach	February 13
1	Daytona 500	Daytona International Speedway, Daytona Beach	February 16
2	Subway 400	North Carolina Speedway, Rockingham	February 23
3	UAW-DaimlerChrysler 400	Las Vegas Motor Speedway, Las Vegas	March 2
4	Bass Pro Shops MBNA 500	Atlanta Motor Speedway, Hampton	March 9
5	Carolina Dodge Dealers 400	Darlington Raceway, Darlington	March 16
6	Food City 500	Bristol Motor Speedway, Bristol	March 23
7	Samsung/RadioShack 500	Texas Motor Speedway, Fort Worth	March 30
8	Aaron's 499	Talladega Superspeedway, Talladega	April 6
9	Virginia 500	Martinsville Speedway, Ridgeway	April 13
10	Auto Club 500	California Speedway, Fontana	April 27
11	Pontiac Excitement 400	Richmond International Raceway, Richmond	May 3
	Winston Open	Lowe's Motor Speedway, Concord	May 17
	The Winston	Lowe's Motor Speedway, Concord	May 17
12	Coca-Cola 600	Lowe's Motor Speedway, Concord	May 25
13	MBNA Armed Forces Family 400	Dover International Speedway, Dover	June 1
14	Pocono 500	Pocono Raceway, Long Pond	June 8
15	Sirius 400	Michigan International Speedway, Brooklyn	June 15
16	Dodge/Save Mart 350	Infineon Raceway, Sonoma	June 22
17	Pepsi 400	Daytona International Speedway, Daytona Beach	July 5
18	Tropicana 400	Chicagoland Speedway, Joliet	July 13
19	New England 300	New Hampshire International Speedway, Loudon	July 20
20	Pennsylvania 500	Pocono Raceway, Long Pond	July 27
21	Brickyard 400	Indianapolis Motor Speedway, Speedway	August 3
22	Sirius Satellite Radio at The Glen	Watkins Glen International, Watkins Glen	August 10
23	GFS Marketplace 400	Michigan International Speedway, Brooklyn	August 17
24	Sharpie 500	Bristol Motor Speedway, Bristol	August 23
25	Mountain Dew Southern 500	Darlington Raceway, Darlington	August 31
26	Chevy Rock & Roll 400	Richmond International Raceway, Richmond	September 6
27	Sylvania 300	New Hampshire International Speedway, Loudon	September 14
28	MBNA America 400	Dover International Speedway, Dover	September 21
29	EA Sports 500	Talladega Superspeedway, Talladega	September 28
30	Banquet 400 presented by ConAgra Foods	Kansas Speedway, Kansas City	October 5
31	UAW-GM Quality 500	Lowe's Motor Speedway, Concord	October 11
32	Subway 500	Martinsville Speedway, Ridgeway	October 19
33	Bass Pro Shops MBNA 500	Atlanta Motor Speedway, Hampton	October 26–27
34	Checker Auto Parts 500 presented by Havoline	Phoenix International Raceway, Phoenix	November 2
35	Pop Secret Microwave Popcorn 400	North Carolina Speedway, Rockingham	November 9
36	Ford 400	Homestead–Miami Speedway, Homestead	November 16

== Races ==
No.	Race	Pole position	Most laps led	Winning driver	Manufacturer
	Budweiser Shootout	Geoff Bodine	Jeff Gordon	Dale Earnhardt Jr.	Chevrolet
	Gatorade 125 #1	Jeff Green	Jeff Green	Robby Gordon	Chevrolet
	Gatorade 125 #2	Dale Earnhardt Jr.	Dale Earnhardt Jr.	Dale Earnhardt Jr.	Chevrolet
1	Daytona 500	Jeff Green	Michael Waltrip	Michael Waltrip	Chevrolet
2	Subway 400	Dave Blaney	Rusty Wallace	Dale Jarrett	Ford
3	UAW-Daimler Chrysler 400	Bobby Labonte	Dale Earnhardt Jr.	Matt Kenseth	Ford
4	Bass Pro Shops MBNA 500	Ryan Newman	Bobby Labonte	Bobby Labonte	Chevrolet
5	Carolina Dodge Dealers 400	Elliott Sadler	Dale Earnhardt Jr.	Ricky Craven	Pontiac
6	Food City 500	Ryan Newman	Jeff Gordon	Kurt Busch	Ford
7	Samsung/Radio Shack 500	Bobby Labonte	Elliott Sadler	Ryan Newman	Dodge
8	Aaron's 499	Jeremy Mayfield	Jimmie Johnson	Dale Earnhardt Jr.	Chevrolet
9	Virginia 500	Jeff Gordon	Dale Earnhardt Jr.	Jeff Gordon	Chevrolet
10	Auto Club 500	Steve Park	Tony Stewart	Kurt Busch	Ford
11	Pontiac Excitement 400	Terry Labonte	Joe Nemechek	Joe Nemechek	Chevrolet
	Winston Open	Steve Park	Mike Skinner	Jeff Burton	Ford
	The Winston	Bill Elliott	Tony Stewart	Jimmie Johnson	Chevrolet
12	Coca-Cola 600	Ryan Newman	Matt Kenseth	Jimmie Johnson	Chevrolet
13	MBNA Armed Forces Family 400	Ryan Newman	Ryan Newman	Ryan Newman	Dodge
14	Pocono 500	Jimmie Johnson	Sterling Marlin	Tony Stewart	Chevrolet
15	Sirius 400	Bobby Labonte	Sterling Marlin	Kurt Busch	Ford
16	Dodge/Save Mart 350	Boris Said	Robby Gordon	Robby Gordon	Chevrolet
17	Pepsi 400	Steve Park	Kevin Harvick	Greg Biffle	Ford
18	Tropicana 400	Tony Stewart	Tony Stewart	Ryan Newman	Dodge
19	New England 300	Matt Kenseth	Jeff Gordon	Jimmie Johnson	Chevrolet
20	Pennsylvania 500	Ryan Newman	Ryan Newman	Ryan Newman	Dodge
21	Brickyard 400	Kevin Harvick	Tony Stewart	Kevin Harvick	Chevrolet
22	Sirius Satellite Radio at The Glen	Jeff Gordon	Robby Gordon	Robby Gordon	Chevrolet
23	GFS Marketplace 400	Bobby Labonte	Jimmie Johnson	Ryan Newman	Dodge
24	Sharpie 500	Jeff Gordon	Jeff Gordon	Kurt Busch	Ford
25	Mountain Dew Southern 500	Ryan Newman	Ryan Newman	Terry Labonte	Chevrolet
26	Chevy Rock & Roll 400	Mike Skinner	Jeff Gordon	Ryan Newman	Dodge
27	Sylvania 300	Ryan Newman	Dale Earnhardt Jr.	Jimmie Johnson	Chevrolet
28	MBNA America 400	Matt Kenseth	Kevin Harvick	Ryan Newman	Dodge
29	EA Sports 500	Elliott Sadler	Jeff Gordon	Michael Waltrip	Chevrolet
30	Banquet 400 presented by ConAgra Foods	Jimmie Johnson	Bill Elliott	Ryan Newman	Dodge
31	UAW-GM Quality 500	Ryan Newman	Tony Stewart	Tony Stewart	Chevrolet
32	Subway 500	Jeff Gordon	Jeff Gordon	Jeff Gordon	Chevrolet
33	Bass Pro Shops MBNA 500	Ryan Newman	Tony Stewart	Jeff Gordon	Chevrolet
34	Checker Auto Parts 500 presented by Havoline	Ryan Newman	Kurt Busch	Dale Earnhardt Jr.	Chevrolet
35	Pop Secret Microwave Popcorn 400	Ryan Newman	Bill Elliott	Bill Elliott	Dodge
36	Ford 400	Jamie McMurray	Bill Elliott	Bobby Labonte	Chevrolet

=== Budweiser Shootout ===
The Budweiser Shootout was held February 8 at Daytona International Speedway. Geoff Bodine started on the pole, which was decided by a random draw. The race featured drivers who have won a pole in the previous season or have won the event before. 2003 marked changes to the race's format, for the first time the race ran at night. The 70-lap event was now split into two segments. After the first 20-lap segment a 10-minute intermission took place allowing drivers to make pit stops and repair their cars. The second segment featured a 50-lap race to the finish with cars restarting double file on all restarts. Drivers were also required to make at least one pit stop under the green flag.

Top ten results:

Pos.	No.	Driver	Make	Team
1	8	Dale Earnhardt Jr.	Chevrolet	Dale Earnhardt, Inc.
2	24	Jeff Gordon	Chevrolet	Hendrick Motorsports
3	17	Matt Kenseth	Ford	Roush Racing
4	12	Ryan Newman	Dodge	Penske Racing
5	22	Ward Burton	Dodge	Bill Davis Racing
6	49	Ken Schrader	Dodge	BAM Racing
7	48	Jimmie Johnson	Chevrolet	Hendrick Motorsports
8	21	Ricky Rudd	Ford	Wood Brothers Racing
9	29	Kevin Harvick	Chevrolet	Richard Childress Racing
10	32	Ricky Craven	Pontiac	PPI Motorsports

=== Gatorade Twin 125s ===
The Gatorade 125s qualifying for the Daytona 500 were held on February 12 at Daytona International Speedway.

Race one			Race two		
Top ten results
pos.	No.	driver	pos.	No.	driver
1	31	Robby Gordon	1	8	Dale Earnhardt Jr.
2	30	Jeff Green	2	15	Michael Waltrip
3	21	Ricky Rudd	3	54	Todd Bodine
4	40	Sterling Marlin	4	2	Rusty Wallace
5	99	Jeff Burton	5	20	Tony Stewart
6	88	Dale Jarrett	6	48	Jimmie Johnson
7	24	Jeff Gordon	7	43	John Andretti
8	25	Joe Nemechek	8	9	Bill Elliott
9	22	Ward Burton	9	38	Elliott Sadler
10	42	Jamie McMurray	10	09	Mike Wallace

=== 45th Daytona 500 ===
Top ten results

1. #15 - Michael Waltrip*
2. #97 - Kurt Busch
3. #48 - Jimmie Johnson
4. #29 - Kevin Harvick
5. #6 - Mark Martin
6. #31 - Robby Gordon
7. #20 - Tony Stewart
8. #19 - Jeremy Mayfield
9. #09 - Mike Wallace
10. #88 - Dale Jarrett

Failed to qualify: Larry Foyt (#14), Brett Bodine (#11), Hermie Sadler (#02), David Green (#60), Kirk Shelmerdine (#90), Derrike Cope (#37), Mike Harmon (#78)

- Michael Waltrip became a two-time winner of the "Great American Race", even though the race was rain-shortened.
- Michael Waltrip scored his third of four career wins. His first three career wins, however, were all scored consecutively at Daytona under the NASCAR on FOX team (Feb. 2001, July 2002, and Feb. 2003), which included the support of FOX analyst and older brother Darrell.
- Ryan Newman had a crash in this race, in which his car got clipped by Ken Schrader coming off of turn 4 and slid down the front straightaway, flipping violently in the tri-oval and coming to a rest on its roof.
- At 109 laps and 272.5 miles (438.5 km), this was the shortest Daytona 500 ever recorded.
- After they agreed to be the title sponsor for NASCAR's top series in 1971, this marked the 1,000th race for RJ Reynolds Tobacco Company and Winston.

=== Subway 400 ===
The Subway 400 was held on February 23 at North Carolina Speedway. Dave Blaney was the pole winner.

1. #88 - Dale Jarrett*
2. #97 - Kurt Busch
3. #17 - Matt Kenseth
4. #32 - Ricky Craven
5. #42 - Jamie McMurray
6. #2 - Rusty Wallace
7. #6 - Mark Martin
8. #48 - Jimmie Johnson
9. #38 - Elliott Sadler
10. #77 - Dave Blaney

Failed to qualify: none

- This would be Jarrett's only victory in 2003, and his last Cup Series victory until Talladega in October 2005, 2 years, and 100 races later.

=== UAW-DaimlerChrysler 400 ===
The UAW-DaimlerChrysler 400 was held on March 2 at Las Vegas Motor Speedway. Bobby Labonte was the pole winner.

Top ten results

1. #17 - Matt Kenseth*
2. #8 - Dale Earnhardt Jr.
3. #15 - Michael Waltrip
4. #18 - Bobby Labonte
5. #20 - Tony Stewart
6. #99 - Jeff Burton
7. #12 - Ryan Newman
8. #40 - Sterling Marlin
9. #25 - Joe Nemechek
10. #1 - Steve Park

Failed to qualify: Greg Biffle (#16), Brandon Ash (#02)

- This would be Kenseth's only Cup Series victory in 2003.

=== Bass Pro Shops 500 ===
The Bass Pro Shops MBNA 500 was held on March 9 at Atlanta Motor Speedway. Ryan Newman sat on the pole.

Top ten results

1. #18 - Bobby Labonte
2. #24 - Jeff Gordon
3. #8 - Dale Earnhardt Jr.
4. #17 - Matt Kenseth*
5. #20 - Tony Stewart
6. #38 - Elliott Sadler
7. #7 - Jimmy Spencer
8. #77 - Dave Blaney
9. #25 - Joe Nemechek
10. #12 - Ryan Newman 1 lap down

Failed to qualify: Bobby Hamilton Jr. (#35), Jeff Fultz (#57)

- After finishing 4th, Kenseth took the points lead and never looked back. He led the standings for 33 consecutive weeks en route to his first and only championship. His 33 consecutive week point lead is a NASCAR record.

=== Carolina Dodge Dealers 400 ===
The Carolina Dodge Dealers 400 was held on March 16 at Darlington Raceway. Elliott Sadler sat on the pole.

Top ten results

1. #32 - Ricky Craven*
2. #97 - Kurt Busch
3. #77 - Dave Blaney
4. #6 - Mark Martin
5. #15 - Michael Waltrip
6. #8 - Dale Earnhardt Jr.
7. #38 - Elliott Sadler
8. #17 - Matt Kenseth
9. #9 - Bill Elliott
10. #20 - Tony Stewart

Failed to qualify: none

- Ricky Craven edged out Kurt Busch by .002 seconds, the closest finish in NASCAR history until the 2018 NASCAR Xfinity Series season opener at Daytona when Tyler Reddick edged out Elliott Sadler by .0004 seconds, and the closest finish in Cup Series history until May 2024 when Kyle Larson edged out Chris Buescher at Kansas by .001 seconds.
- This was the 5th, and as of 2020, the last time in Darlington's history that a race was decided by a last-lap pass.
- This was Craven's final career Cup Series victory, as well as the 154th and final Cup Series victory for Pontiac.

=== Food City 500 ===
The Food City 500 was held on March 23 at Bristol Motor Speedway. Ryan Newman was the pole winner for this race.

Top ten results

1. #97 - Kurt Busch*
2. #17 - Matt Kenseth
3. #18 - Bobby Labonte
4. #21 - Ricky Rudd
5. #16 - Greg Biffle
6. #40 - Sterling Marlin
7. #29 - Kevin Harvick 1 lap down
8. #48 - Jimmie Johnson 1 lap down
9. #24 - Jeff Gordon 1 lap down
10. #23 - Kenny Wallace 1 lap down

Failed to qualify: Hermie Sadler (#02), Larry Foyt (#14)

- NASCAR considered postponing the race due to the start of the War in Iraq. The Government gave all professional sporting associations their consent to continue.
- This was NASCAR's 2000th race run in Cup Series history.
- Kurt Busch finally won a race in 2003 after finishing second in three of the first five races of the season. This was the sixth race of 2003.
- This race was marred by a brutal crash involving Ward Burton and Kyle Petty, in which Petty's car hit the wall with a g-force of over 80 g, making it the hardest known crash in Cup history until 2010.

=== Samsung/Radio Shack 500 ===
The Samsung/Radio Shack 500 was held at Texas Motor Speedway on March 30. Texas native Bobby Labonte was the pole sitter for this race.

Top ten results

1. #12 - Ryan Newman
2. #8 - Dale Earnhardt Jr.
3. #24 - Jeff Gordon
4. #01 - Jerry Nadeau
5. #6 - Mark Martin
6. #17 - Matt Kenseth
7. #30 - Jeff Green
8. #48 - Jimmie Johnson
9. #97 - Kurt Busch
10. #42 - Jamie McMurray

Failed to qualify: Kerry Earnhardt (#83), David Starr (#75)

- This race was the first of several this season to have controversy with racing back to the caution flag. On lap 169, Matt Kenseth was leading when the caution came out. Kenseth slowed to let his teammate, Jeff Burton, have a lap back. Jeff Gordon was in second, and didn't want a bunch of drivers getting laps back, so he maintained his speed and passed Kenseth just before the start finish line, seemingly trapping Kurt Busch and Ricky Rudd a lap down. NASCAR ruled that as the leader when the caution flew, it was up to Kenseth to decide whether drivers should get laps back or not, and as he had slowed, Gordon should have slowed as well. Kenseth was given the lead back while Busch and Rudd were given their laps back as they had beaten Kenseth back to the line, but not Gordon.

=== Aaron's 499 ===
The Aaron's 499 was held at Talladega Superspeedway on April 6. Jeremy Mayfield won the pole.

Top ten results

1. #8 - Dale Earnhardt Jr.*
2. #29 - Kevin Harvick
3. #38 - Elliott Sadler
4. #32 - Ricky Craven
5. #5 - Terry Labonte
6. #40 - Sterling Marlin
7. #22 - Ward Burton
8. #24 - Jeff Gordon
9. #17 - Matt Kenseth
10. #31 - Robby Gordon

Failed to qualify: Brett Bodine (#11), Larry Foyt (#14), David Green (#60) (Note: Phoenix Racing's Mike Wallace had originally failed to qualify, but Green's car was found too low and his time was disallowed.)

- Dale Earnhardt Jr. became the only driver in NASCAR history to win four consecutive races at Talladega, breaking him out of a tie with Buddy Baker. Dale Jr. would also become the second driver in NASCAR history to win four straight superspeedway races at one track, joining Bill Elliott. Elliott won four Michigan races in a row when he pulled off season sweeps in 1985 and 1986.
- The "Big One" did not take long and collected 27 cars on lap 4, making this the largest crash in a Cup race in the modern era until the 2024 YellaWood 500, which collected 28 cars. The crash barely included Earnhardt Jr., who started in the back of the field and managed to race his way to victory lane anyway.
- Earnhardt was involved in a controversial decision at the end of the race where it appeared he went below the yellow line in an attempt to improve position. NASCAR ruled Earnhardt was forced down making it a clean pass.

=== Virginia 500 ===
The Virginia 500 was held at Martinsville Speedway on April 13. Jeff Gordon won the pole.

Top ten results

1. #24 - Jeff Gordon
2. #18 - Bobby Labonte
3. #8 - Dale Earnhardt Jr.
4. #99 - Jeff Burton
5. #38 - Elliott Sadler
6. #20 - Tony Stewart
7. #40 - Sterling Marlin
8. #2 - Rusty Wallace
9. #48 - Jimmie Johnson
10. #49 - Ken Schrader

Failed to qualify: none

- Championship leader Matt Kenseth would end up finished in 22nd, his 1st of only 4 finishes outside the top-20 all season. This would be Kenseth's worst finish until Talladega in September.

=== Auto Club 500 ===
The Auto Club 500 was held at California Speedway on April 27. Steve Park won the pole.

Top ten results

1. #97 - Kurt Busch
2. #18 - Bobby Labonte
3. #2 - Rusty Wallace
4. #9 - Bill Elliott
5. #42 - Jamie McMurray
6. #8 - Dale Earnhardt Jr.
7. #15 - Michael Waltrip
8. #43 - John Andretti
9. #17 - Matt Kenseth
10. #40 - Sterling Marlin

Failed to qualify: Kerry Earnhardt (#83), Hideo Fukuyama (#66)

- This was Jerry Nadeau's last race.

=== Pontiac Excitement 400 ===
The Pontiac Excitement 400 was held at Richmond International Raceway on May 3. Terry Labonte won the pole. The race was shortened with only 7 laps to go, due to rain.

Top ten results

1. #25 - Joe Nemechek
2. #18 - Bobby Labonte
3. #8 - Dale Earnhardt Jr.*
4. #31 - Robby Gordon
5. #6 - Mark Martin
6. #29 - Kevin Harvick
7. #17 - Matt Kenseth
8. #97 - Kurt Busch
9. #99 - Jeff Burton
10. #2 - Rusty Wallace

Failed to qualify: Hermie Sadler (#02), Derrike Cope (#37), Hideo Fukuyama (#66)

- Jerry Nadeau, driver of the #01 Pontiac for MB2/MBV Motorsports, was critically injured in a practice session for this race. Jason Keller drove in his place. Nadeau never ran another Cup Series race.
- After this race, Jeff Green was fired for his remarks about Kevin Harvick and swapped rides with Steve Park in the #1 who was fired a day later than Green was. Steve would drive the #30 for the rest of the year while Green drove the #1 until Bristol.
- With Dale Earnhardt Jr. finishing 3rd and collecting 5 bonus points, and Matt Kenseth finishing 7th with no bonus points, Kenseth lost 24 points to Dale Jr. in this race. Kenseth's point margin after Richmond was now only 20 points ahead of Earnhardt. This was the closest point margin all season for Matt Kenseth while he had the point lead.

=== The Winston ===
Top ten results (Winston Open)

1. #99 - Jeff Burton
2. #77 - Dave Blaney
3. #4 - Mike Skinner
4. #11 - Brett Bodine
5. #16 - Greg Biffle
6. #7 - Jimmy Spencer
7. #23 - Kenny Wallace
8. #30 - Steve Park
9. #45 - Kyle Petty
10. #0 - Jack Sprague

Top ten results

1. #48 - Jimmie Johnson
2. #97 - Kurt Busch
3. #18 - Bobby Labonte
4. #25 - Joe Nemechek
5. #15 - Michael Waltrip
6. #17 - Matt Kenseth
7. #29 - Kevin Harvick
8. #24 - Jeff Gordon
9. #99 - Jeff Burton*
10. #32 - Ricky Craven
- Burton entered via winning the Winston Open

=== Coca-Cola 600 ===
The Coca-Cola 600 was held at Lowe's Motor Speedway on May 25. Ryan Newman won the pole. The race was shortened to 276 laps due to inclement weather.

Top ten results

1. #48 - Jimmie Johnson
2. #17 - Matt Kenseth*
3. #18 - Bobby Labonte
4. #7 - Jimmy Spencer
5. #12 - Ryan Newman
6. #15 - Michael Waltrip
7. #40 - Sterling Marlin
8. #24 - Jeff Gordon
9. #88 - Dale Jarrett 1 lap down
10. #22 - Ward Burton 1 lap down

Failed to qualify: Hermie Sadler (#02), Brett Bodine (#11), Derrike Cope (#37)

- In addition to finishing 2nd, Kenseth lead the most laps, granting him 10 bonus points, while Dale Earnhardt Jr. finishing 41st with no bonus points, extending Kenseth's points lead to 160 points over Earnhardt. This would make Kenseth's point lead safe and locked up for the rest of the season, as he would continue to have a 160+ point lead for the next 24 weeks, between this race and when he clinched the title at Rockingham in November, which is also a NASCAR record.
- This would be the only race of the season that Matt Kenseth would lead the most laps.

=== MBNA Armed Forces Family 400 ===
The MBNA Armed Forces Family 400 was held at Dover International Speedway on June 1. Ryan Newman won the pole.

Top ten results

1. #12 - Ryan Newman
2. #24 - Jeff Gordon
3. #18 - Bobby Labonte
4. #20 - Tony Stewart
5. #10 - Johnny Benson
6. #2 - Rusty Wallace
7. #17 - Matt Kenseth
8. #32 - Ricky Craven
9. #31 - Robby Gordon
10. #5 - Terry Labonte

Failed to qualify: Derrike Cope (#37), Hermie Sadler (#02)

- Ryan Newman completed the last half of this race without power steering.
- Brett Bodine made his last career start in this race, finishing 42nd after crashing out.

=== Pocono 500 ===
The Pocono 500 was held at Pocono Raceway on June 8. Jimmie Johnson won the pole. This broke a 27-race winless streak for Stewart.

Top ten results

1. #20 - Tony Stewart
2. #6 - Mark Martin
3. #17 - Matt Kenseth
4. #8 - Dale Earnhardt Jr.
5. #12 - Ryan Newman
6. #40 - Sterling Marlin
7. #5 - Terry Labonte
8. #22 - Ward Burton
9. #38 - Elliott Sadler
10. #32 - Ricky Craven

Failed to qualify: Derrike Cope (#37), Morgan Shepherd (#89)

- This would be Tony Stewart's first win in a Chevrolet Monte Carlo.
- On lap 7 Ken Schrader gets loose and hits the wall and flips once before catching fire. He was uninjured.
- With 3 laps to go, Jeff Green hits the inside wall on the backstretch and smashes the front of the car. This would lead to Tony Stewart winning the race under caution. Terry Labonte and Greg Biffle were also shown to have damage afterward.

=== Sirius 400 ===
The Sirius 400 was held at Michigan International Speedway on June 15. Bobby Labonte was the pole sitter.

Top ten results

1. #97 - Kurt Busch
2. #18 - Bobby Labonte
3. #24 - Jeff Gordon
4. #17 - Matt Kenseth
5. #15 - Michael Waltrip
6. #40 - Sterling Marlin
7. #8 - Dale Earnhardt Jr.
8. #20 - Tony Stewart
9. #6 - Mark Martin
10. #5 - Terry Labonte

Failed to qualify: Mike Skinner (#4), Larry Foyt (#14)

- Brett Bodine was involving in a brutal crash in practice that left him severely injured. Brett's brother Geoff Bodine drove the #11 for this race, in what would be the last Cup start for Brett Bodine Racing.

=== Dodge/Save Mart 350 ===
The Dodge/Save Mart 350 was held at Infineon Raceway on June 22. Boris Said was the pole sitter.

Top ten results

1. #31 - Robby Gordon
2. #24 - Jeff Gordon
3. #29 - Kevin Harvick
4. #9 - Bill Elliott
5. #12 - Ryan Newman
6. #01 - Boris Said *
7. #1 - Ron Fellows *
8. #2 - Rusty Wallace
9. #18 - Bobby Labonte
10. #19 - Jeremy Mayfield

Failed to qualify: P. J. Jones (#14), Brandon Ash (#02), Paul Menard (#33), Jim Inglebright (#00)

- Three days prior to this race, on Thursday, June 19, NASCAR officially announced that the telecommunications firm Nextel would replace RJ Reynolds brand Winston as NASCAR's title sponsor for the Cup Series at the start of the 2004 season, thus ending a 33-year relationship between NASCAR and Winston, which began back on January 10, 1971.
- Controversy erupted on lap 71. Kevin Harvick was leading race winner Robby Gordon when a caution came out for a crash at a different part of the track. Gordon kept charging, and passed Harvick in the keyhole turn, taking the lead before they crossed the start/finish line. Harvick called it a "chicken move" and Jeff Gordon said "I could not believe it when I saw it" and called his passing under the yellow "unheard of." The controversial pass, however, was entirely legal under NASCAR rules at the time, and Robby Gordon was assessed no penalty. The so-called "unethical breach of racing ethics" proved to be the winning edge, and Robby Gordon went on to win the race. He was subjected to considerable scrutiny and ridicule after the race. However, others considered the complaints to be hypocrisy or "sour grapes" by the losers.
- Boris Said won his first career NASCAR pole as a Road course ringer, also finishing his career-best Cup finish at the time.
- Ron Fellows came very close to winning his first Cup Series victory, leading over 21 laps late in the race after briefly taking the lead from Robby Gordon and Kevin Harvick. Fellows lost his chance at the win after a yellow came out with less than 30 laps to go, forcing him to make a pit stop. He dropped from 1st to 31st and recovered to finish 7th.

=== Pepsi 400 ===
The Pepsi 400 was held at Daytona International Speedway on July 5. Steve Park won the pole.

1. #16 - Greg Biffle*
2. #99 - Jeff Burton
3. #21 - Ricky Rudd
4. #5 - Terry Labonte
5. #18 - Bobby Labonte
6. #17 - Matt Kenseth
7. #8 - Dale Earnhardt Jr.
8. #19 - Jeremy Mayfield
9. #29 - Kevin Harvick
10. #88 - Dale Jarrett

Failed to qualify: Kerry Earnhardt (#83), Tony Raines (#74), Shane Hmiel (#43), Christian Fittipaldi (#44)

- This was Biffle's first career Cup Series victory.
- This race marked the first time since 1993 that car #43 did not race at Daytona or did not race in a NASCAR points race.

=== Tropicana 400 ===
The Tropicana 400 was held at Chicagoland Speedway on July 13. Tony Stewart sat on the pole.

1. #12 - Ryan Newman
2. #20 - Tony Stewart
3. #48 - Jimmie Johnson
4. #24 - Jeff Gordon
5. #15 - Michael Waltrip
6. #99 - Jeff Burton
7. #31 - Robby Gordon
8. #42 - Jamie McMurray
9. #38 - Elliott Sadler
10. #19 - Jeremy Mayfield

Failed to qualify: Jason Keller (#81)

=== New England 300 ===
The New England 300 was held at New Hampshire International Speedway on July 20. Matt Kenseth won the pole.

1. #48 - Jimmie Johnson
2. #29 - Kevin Harvick
3. #17 - Matt Kenseth
4. #12 - Ryan Newman
5. #31 - Robby Gordon
6. #8 - Dale Earnhardt Jr.
7. #88 - Dale Jarrett
8. #30 - Steve Park
9. #99 - Jeff Burton
10. #16 - Greg Biffle

Failed to qualify: Tim Sauter (#71), David Reutimann (#04), Carl Long (#46), Larry Foyt (#50)

=== Pennsylvania 500 ===
The Pennsylvania 500 was held at Pocono Raceway on July 27. Ryan Newman won the pole.

1. #12- Ryan Newman
2. #97- Kurt Busch
3. #8- Dale Earnhardt Jr.
4. #15- Michael Waltrip
5. #5- Terry Labonte
6. #99- Jeff Burton
7. #25- Joe Nemechek
8. #54- Todd Bodine
9. #77- Dave Blaney
10. #40- Sterling Marlin

Failed to qualify: Brett Bodine (#4)

=== Brickyard 400 ===
The Brickyard 400 was held at Indianapolis Motor Speedway on August 3. Kevin Harvick won the pole and the race.

1. #29 - Kevin Harvick
2. #17 - Matt Kenseth
3. #42 - Jamie McMurray
4. #24 - Jeff Gordon
5. #9 - Bill Elliott
6. #31 - Robby Gordon
7. #97 - Kurt Busch
8. #7 - Jimmy Spencer
9. #6 - Mark Martin
10. #2 - Rusty Wallace

Failed to qualify: Brett Bodine (#11), Ken Schrader (#49), Billy Bigley (#79), Ted Musgrave (#07), Robert Pressley (#4), Jim Sauter (#71), Christian Fittipaldi (#43), David Reutimann (#04), Hermie Sadler (#02)

- This marked the first time that Ken Schrader failed to qualify for a race. Until this weekend, he had made 579 consecutive starts.
- Brett Bodine failed to qualify for this race by less than a thousandth of a second. This would be Bodine's last Cup Series attempt, as he would shut down his self-owned team afterwards.

=== Sirius Satellite Radio at The Glen ===
The Sirius Satellite Radio at The Glen was held at Watkins Glen International on August 10. Jeff Gordon was the pole sitter.

1. #31 - Robby Gordon*
2. #39 - Scott Pruett*
3. #8 - Dale Earnhardt Jr.
4. #48 - Jimmie Johnson
5. #29 - Kevin Harvick
6. #22 - Ward Burton
7. #88 - Dale Jarrett
8. #17 - Matt Kenseth
9. #12 - Ryan Newman
10. #6 - Mark Martin

Failed to qualify: Ken Schrader (#49), Joe Varde (#35), Scott Maxwell (#43), Larry Foyt (#50)

- Paul Menard made his NASCAR Cup Series debut in this race, finishing 29th.
- This was Robby Gordon's final Cup Series victory. Gordon got a sweep of the road courses in 2003.
- Scott Pruett picked up his career-best finish in the Cup Series, driving a fourth car for Chip Ganassi Racing.

=== GFS Marketplace 400 ===
The GFS Marketplace 400 was held at Michigan International Speedway on August 17. Bobby Labonte won the pole.

1. #12 - Ryan Newman
2. #29 - Kevin Harvick
3. #20 - Tony Stewart
4. #16 - Greg Biffle
5. #30 - Steve Park
6. #31 - Robby Gordon
7. #15 - Michael Waltrip
8. #49 - Ken Schrader
9. #17 - Matt Kenseth
10. #10 - Johnny Benson

Failed to qualify: Stacy Compton (#4)

- An altercation occurred between Kurt Busch and Jimmy Spencer after the race and punches were thrown. A police report was filed and Jimmy Spencer was suspended for the next week's race at Bristol. Kurt would be on probation after this race.

=== Sharpie 500 ===
The Sharpie 500 was held at Bristol Motor Speedway on August 23. Jeff Gordon sat on the pole.

1. #97 - Kurt Busch
2. #29 - Kevin Harvick
3. #42 - Jamie McMurray
4. #17 - Matt Kenseth
5. #48 - Jimmie Johnson
6. #12 - Ryan Newman
7. #88 - Dale Jarrett
8. #32 - Ricky Craven
9. #8 - Dale Earnhardt Jr.
10. #19 - Jeremy Mayfield

Failed to qualify: Hermie Sadler (#02), Billy Bigley (#79), Derrike Cope (#37)

- This was the first race to include the "Victory Lap" tribute program to honor all the drivers who won a championship during the Winston Cup era, with several races for the rest of the season selecting a single active driver, and former driver, to perform a ceremonial lap around the track during the pace laps. The "Victory Lap" champions for this race were Alan Kulwicki (former), and Rusty Wallace (active). Kulwicki's car was driven by Jimmy Hensley for the lap.
- The fans' disagreement over the suspension of Jimmy Spencer and only placing Kurt Busch on probation stemming from the incident the previous week prompted fans to boo Busch as he exited his car in victory lane. Busch's sponsor Sharpie was none too happy with the fans' response to their driver in victory lane, as Sharpie was the sponsor of the race. Soon after, Sharpie began phasing themselves off of the #97 car.

=== Mountain Dew Southern 500 ===
The Mountain Dew Southern 500 was held at Darlington Raceway on August 31. Ryan Newman sat on the pole.

1. #5 - Terry Labonte*
2. #29 - Kevin Harvick
3. #48 - Jimmie Johnson
4. #42 - Jamie McMurray
5. #9 - Bill Elliott
6. #19 - Jeremy Mayfield
7. #18 - Bobby Labonte
8. #32 - Ricky Craven
9. #38 - Elliott Sadler
10. #16 - Greg Biffle

Failed to qualify: Larry Foyt (#50)

- The "Victory Lap" champion for this race was Cale Yarborough.
- This was the last Southern 500 to be held on its traditional Labor Day weekend date until 2015.
- This was Terry Labonte's first win in 157 races, dating back to Texas Motor Speedway in March 1999. This race would also be Labonte's final career Winston Cup win.
- As of 2020, Terry Labonte is the only driver in NASCAR history to score his first and last career win in the same race. He is also the only driver in NASCAR history to make his debut (finishing 4th in 1978), score his first career win, and score his last career win, all in the same race.

=== Chevy Rock and Roll 400 ===
The Chevy Rock and Roll 400 was held at Richmond International Raceway on September 6. Mike Skinner sat on the pole.

1. #12 - Ryan Newman
2. #19 - Jeremy Mayfield
3. #21 - Ricky Rudd
4. #99 - Jeff Burton
5. #2 - Rusty Wallace
6. #18 - Bobby Labonte
7. #17 - Matt Kenseth
8. #5 - Terry Labonte
9. #10 - Johnny Benson
10. #24 - Jeff Gordon

Failed to qualify: Larry Foyt (#50), Billy Bigley (#79)

- With 8 laps to go, Kevin Harvick got loose against Ricky Rudd and spun in the wall. After the race, both cars stopped on the pit road and both drivers began a scuffle between both teams. Harvick was fined $35,000, and crew chief Todd Berrier was fined $10,000 for the incident. In addition, two other pit crew members were fined $2,500 each and both pit crew members were suspended for the next week's race.

=== Sylvania 300 ===
The Sylvania 300 was held at New Hampshire International Speedway on September 14. Ryan Newman sat on the pole. This was the final race for Bill France Jr. as the CEO of NASCAR.

1. #48 - Jimmie Johnson
2. #21 - Ricky Rudd
3. #25 - Joe Nemechek
4. #9 - Bill Elliott
5. #8 - Dale Earnhardt Jr.
6. #2 - Rusty Wallace
7. #17 - Matt Kenseth
8. #38 - Elliott Sadler
9. #12 - Ryan Newman
10. #42 - Jamie McMurray

Failed to qualify: Larry Foyt (#50), Derrike Cope (#37), Morgan Shepherd (#89), Carl Long (#46)

- This was the final Cup race in which drivers raced back to the start-finish line as soon as a caution flag came out. Dale Jarrett's #88 Ford hit the wall exiting turn 4 and stopped in the middle of the track. Many cars entering the front straight swerved wildly trying to avoid Jarrett's car.

=== MBNA America 400 ===
The MBNA America 400 was held at Dover International Speedway on September 21. Qualifying was canceled due to Hurricane Isabel; as a result, Matt Kenseth sat on the pole on owner points. This was the first Cup race for Brian France as the new CEO of NASCAR, having taken over the role from his father Bill France Jr., who stepped down on September 16 due to his ailing health.

1. #12 - Ryan Newman
2. #19 - Jeremy Mayfield
3. #20 - Tony Stewart
4. #29 - Kevin Harvick
5. #24 - Jeff Gordon
6. #42 - Jamie McMurray
7. #16 - Greg Biffle
8. #48 - Jimmie Johnson
9. #17 - Matt Kenseth
10. #21 - Ricky Rudd

Failed to qualify: Larry Foyt (#50), Morgan Shepherd (#89), Billy Bigley (#79), Scott Wimmer (#27), Christian Fittipaldi (#44), Tim Sauter (#71)

- This was the first race in which the field was frozen at the start of a caution period. Racing back to the caution was no longer allowed; NASCAR uses video replay and scoring loop data to determine the running order at the moment of caution. In conjunction with the change, NASCAR introduced the free pass, or Lucky Dog, in which the highest-placed driver who is one or more laps behind the leader gets a lap back when the caution period begins.
- After finishing 9th, Matt Kenseth left Dover with a 436-point lead over Kevin Harvick, the largest point lead to be recorded for the 2003 season.

=== EA Sports 500 ===
The EA Sports 500 was held September 28 at Talladega Superspeedway. Elliott Sadler won the pole.

Top ten results:

Pos.	No.	Driver	Make	Team
1	15	Michael Waltrip	Chevrolet	Dale Earnhardt, Inc.
2	8	Dale Earnhardt Jr.	Chevrolet	Dale Earnhardt, Inc.
3	20	Tony Stewart	Chevrolet	Joe Gibbs Racing
4	12	Ryan Newman	Dodge	Penske Racing
5	24	Jeff Gordon	Chevrolet	Hendrick Motorsports
6	97	Kurt Busch	Ford	Roush Racing
7	29	Kevin Harvick	Chevrolet	Richard Childress Racing
8	32	Ricky Craven	Pontiac	PPI Motorsports
9	2	Rusty Wallace	Dodge	Penske Racing
10	09	Mike Wallace	Dodge	Phoenix Racing

Did not qualify: Jason Leffler (#0), Kevin Lepage (#4), Steve Park (#30), Kyle Petty (#45), Mike Bliss (#80), Todd Bodine (#54)

- This would be Waltrip's last career Cup Series victory, and his only victory outside of Daytona. Waltrip celebrated the win by popping out of his car's newly installed emergency roof hatch after doing donuts on the infield grass.
- The "Victory Lap" champions for this race were Bobby Allison (former), and Terry Labonte (active).
- Dale Earnhardt Jr. would come up one spot short on his quest to win 5 straight Talladega races. He would also fail to break out of a tie with Bill Elliott by trying to win 5 straight superspeedway races at one track.
- Matt Kenseth experienced his first DNF of the 2003 season when he blew an engine with 30 laps to go. He finished the race in 33rd position. This would be only his 2nd finish outside of the top 20 so far during the season. Before this race, his worst finish of the year was 22nd at Martinsville back in April.
- With this DNF, Kenseth's 436 point lead dropped to a 354-point lead.

=== Banquet 400 ===
The Banquet 400 was held at Kansas Speedway on October 5. Dale Earnhardt Jr. won the pole.

1. #12 - Ryan Newman*
2. #9 - Bill Elliott
3. #19 - Jeremy Mayfield
4. #20 - Tony Stewart
5. #24 - Jeff Gordon
6. #29 - Kevin Harvick
7. #48 - Jimmie Johnson
8. #42 - Jamie McMurray
9. #2 - Rusty Wallace
10. #21 - Ricky Rudd

Failed to qualify: Larry Foyt (#14), Johnny Sauter (#4)

- This was Ryan Newman's eighth and final win of the season. He scored the most wins of 2003.
- This was the second consecutive week of problems for Championship leader Matt Kenseth. After blowing an engine at Talladega and finishing 33rd the previous week, he was involved in a crash on lap 69 with Michael Waltrip. He still managed to finish the race, but finished 47 laps down in 36th.
- After his 33rd and 36th-place finishes, Matt Kenseth lost a combined total of 177 points to 2nd place. He went from having a 436-point lead after Dover, to a 259-point lead after this event.

=== UAW-GM Quality 500 ===
The UAW-GM Quality 500 was held at Lowe's Motor Speedway on October 11. Ryan Newman sat on the pole.

1. #20 - Tony Stewart
2. #12 - Ryan Newman
3. #48 - Jimmie Johnson
4. #9 - Bill Elliott
5. #24 - Jeff Gordon
6. #18 - Bobby Labonte
7. #42 - Jamie McMurray
8. #17 - Matt Kenseth
9. #8 - Dale Earnhardt Jr.
10. #29 - Kevin Harvick

Failed to qualify: Ken Schrader (#49), Hermie Sadler (#02), Mark Green (#14), Jeff Fultz (#55)

- This was the first fall race at Charlotte to be held on a Saturday night.
- The "Victory Lap" champions for this race were Dale Earnhardt (former), and Jeff Gordon (active). Earnhardt's car was driven by Richard Childress for the lap.
- Brian Vickers made his NASCAR Cup Series debut in this race, finishing in 33rd.

=== Subway 500 ===
The Subway 500 was held at Martinsville Speedway on October 19. Jeff Gordon sat on the pole.

1. #24 - Jeff Gordon*
2. #48 - Jimmie Johnson
3. #20 - Tony Stewart
4. #8 - Dale Earnhardt Jr.
5. #12 - Ryan Newman
6. #5 - Terry Labonte
7. #29 - Kevin Harvick
8. #42 - Jamie McMurray
9. #9 - Bill Elliott
10. #99 - Jeff Burton

Failed to qualify: Mark Green (#14), Morgan Shepherd (#89)

- The "Victory Lap" champion for this race was Darrell Waltrip.
- Jeff Gordon became the first driver since Rusty Wallace in 1994 to pull off the season sweep at Martinsville.
- That was last race of former Daytona 500 Champion Ward Burton in the No. 22 car for Bill Davis Racing before moving to 0 team.

=== Bass Pro Shops MBNA 500 ===
The Bass Pro Shops MBNA 500 was held at Atlanta Motor Speedway on October 26 – October 27. Ryan Newman sat on the pole.

1. #24 - Jeff Gordon
2. #20 - Tony Stewart
3. #48 - Jimmie Johnson
4. #9 - Bill Elliott
5. #18 - Bobby Labonte
6. #8 - Dale Earnhardt Jr.
7. #19 - Jeremy Mayfield
8. #97 - Kurt Busch
9. #7 - Jimmy Spencer
10. #01 - Joe Nemechek

Failed to qualify: Jeff Green (#43), Buckshot Jones (#00), Larry Foyt (#14), Mike Wallace (#09), Billy Bigley (#79), Shelby Howard (#27)

- The "Victory Lap" champion for this race was Bill Elliott.
- Jeff Gordon would be the only driver of 2003 to win back-to-back races.
- The race was suspended after 39 laps due to rain and resumed the following day.
- Silly Season 2004 would actually start a little bit prematurely, as many drivers who have signed for new teams starting in 2004, would actually end up in their rides starting with this race. Ward Burton would drive the #0, followed by Joe Nemechek in the #01, John Andretti in the #1, Kevin Lepage in the #4, and finally, 2004 Rookie of the year contenders Scott Wimmer in the #22 and Brian Vickers in the #25.

=== Checker Auto Parts 500 ===
The Checker Auto Parts 500 was held Phoenix International Raceway on November 2. Ryan Newman sat on the pole.

1. #8 - Dale Earnhardt Jr.
2. #48 - Jimmie Johnson
3. #12 - Ryan Newman
4. #97 - Kurt Busch
5. #15 - Michael Waltrip
6. #17 - Matt Kenseth
7. #24 - Jeff Gordon
8. #99 - Jeff Burton
9. #22 - Scott Wimmer
10. #6 - Mark Martin

Failed to qualify: Derrike Cope (#37), Brandon Ash (#02)

- The "Victory Lap" champion for this race was Dale Jarrett.
- With Junior's win in this race, Matt Kenseth's points lead was reduced to 228 points between the two drivers. For Kenseth to clinch the Winston Cup championship at Rockingham, he would have to finish 7th or better if Junior wins and leads the most laps, or be over 186 points ahead of whoever will be 2nd in the standings.

=== Pop Secret Microwave Popcorn 400 ===
The Pop Secret Microwave Popcorn 400 was held at North Carolina Speedway on November 9. Ryan Newman sat on the pole. Matt Kenseth would clinch the final NASCAR Winston Cup Championship.

1. #9 - Bill Elliott*
2. #48 - Jimmie Johnson
3. #19 - Jeremy Mayfield
4. #17 - Matt Kenseth*
5. #12 - Ryan Newman
6. #74 - Tony Raines
7. #99 - Jeff Burton
8. #18 - Bobby Labonte
9. #20 - Tony Stewart
10. #40 - Sterling Marlin

Failed to qualify: Hermie Sadler (#02), Tim Sauter (#71), Rich Bickle (#79)

- This was Bill Elliott's 44th and final career win.
- This was the final Rockingham race in the fall.
- The "Victory Lap" champions for this race were Benny Parsons (former), and Bobby Labonte (active).
- Kenseth 4th-place finish gave him a 226-point lead over Jimmie Johnson, enough to lock up the championship, as the maximum amount of points earned in a race under the Bob Latford points system was 185.
- Kenseth won the title after winning just one race, becoming only the 4th driver in Cup Series history to accomplish this feat. The other 3 were Bill Rexford in 1950, Ned Jarrett in 1961, and Benny Parsons in 1973. Out of these four, Kenseth is the only one to win under the Bob Latford Winston Cup points system.
- This was Matt Kenseth's 31st race of 2003 where he finished on the lead lap. 31 lead lap finishes in a season is a NASCAR record.
- Matt Kenseth became the 5th different NASCAR Winston Cup Champion in the last 5 years.
- 2003 marked 5 out of the last 6 seasons that a driver would clinch the NASCAR Winston Cup Championship with one race to go, with the only exception being 2002.
- The 2003 NASCAR Winston Cup season would be the final season ever that a NASCAR driver could clinch the Cup Series championship title before the final race of the season.

=== Ford 400 ===
The Ford 400, the final race of the season, and the last race ever under the "Winston Cup" name were held at Homestead–Miami Speedway on November 16. Jamie McMurray sat on the pole.

1. #18 - Bobby Labonte*
2. #29 - Kevin Harvick
3. #48 - Jimmie Johnson
4. #10 - Johnny Benson
5. #24 - Jeff Gordon
6. #19 - Jeremy Mayfield
7. #20 - Tony Stewart
8. #9 - Bill Elliott*
9. #42 - Jamie McMurray
10. #40 - Sterling Marlin

Failed to qualify: Ken Schrader (#49), Kyle Petty (#45), Mike Wallace (#09), Derrike Cope (#79), Rich Bickle (#78)

- This was the first Cup race at Homestead–Miami with the new configuration.
- The "Victory Lap" champions for this race were Richard Petty (former), and Tony Stewart (active).
- This was the 21st and final career Cup Series victory for Bobby Labonte. This would also be 2 races in a row where 2 drivers would score their final career Cup wins.
- Bill Elliott dominated this race by leading 189 of 267 laps, but while leading on the final lap, Elliott cut a tire between turns 1 and 2, handing the win to Labonte. Labonte only led one lap, which would be the last lap. Elliott would end up with an 8th-place finish.
- This would be Bill Elliott final start as a full-time driver.
- Matt Kenseth, who had already clinched the Winston Cup Championship at Rockingham one week earlier, suffered a blown engine on lap 29 and would finish last. This would be only his 2nd DNF of 2003, along with Talladega back in September.
- Even though Kenseth clinched the title at Rockingham with a 226-point lead over Jimmie Johnson, Johnson finished 3rd and collected 5 bonus points, and Kenseth finished 43rd with no bonus points. This resulted in a 136-point loss for Kenseth, the largest one all season. Kenseth officially won the title over Johnson by just 90 points. The last time Kenseth had his lead under 100 points was back in May after Richmond when he was ahead of Dale Earnhardt Jr. by only 20 points.
- Kenseth won $4,250,000 from Winston and RJ Reynolds Tobacco Company, the most money for a winning champion in Winston's history.
- This would be the 2nd straight season that a driver who won the most races would finish outside of the top 5 in points (Matt Kenseth won 5 races in 2002 but finished 8th, and Ryan Newman would win 8 races in 2003, but finished 6th).
- This marked the final race for Winston as NASCAR title sponsor for the Cup Series after 33 seasons (1,035 races).
- This marked the final race for Unocal 76. It had been the official fuel of NASCAR since the sport's inception in 1948 (all 2,030 races).
- This marked the final full-time race for Pontiac. Johnny Benson was the highest finishing Pontiac driver in this race by finishing 4th, giving Pontiac its final top 5 finish ever in the series.

== Final points standings ==
(key) Bold – Pole position awarded by time. Italics – Pole position earned by points standings. * – Most laps led.

Pos	Driver	DAY	CAR	LVS	ATL	DAR	BRI	TEX	TAL	MAR	CAL	RCH	CLT	DOV	POC	MCH	SON	DAY	CHI	NHA	POC	IND	GLN	MCH	BRI	DAR	RCH	NHA	DOV	TAL	KAN	CLT	MAR	ATL	PHO	CAR	HOM	Points
1	Matt Kenseth	20	3	1	4	8	2	6	9	22	9	7	2*	7	3	4	14	6	12	3	13	2	8	9	4	14	7	7	9	33	36	8	13	11	6	4	43	5022
2	Jimmie Johnson	3	8	11	32	27	8	8	15*	9	16	19	1	38	**12**	16	17	18	3	1	15	18	4	27*	5	3	11	1	8	34	**7**	3	2	3	2	2	3	4932
3	Dale Earnhardt Jr.	36	33	2*	3	6*	16	2	1	3*	6	3	41	11	4	7	11	7	38	6	3	14	3	32	9	25	17	5*	37	2	18	9	4	6	1	13	24	4815
4	Jeff Gordon	12	15	37	2	33	9*	3	8	**1**	11	16	8	2	13	3	2	14	4	24*	36	4	**33**	30	**28***	32	10*	19	5	5*	5	5	**1***	1	7	22	5	4785
5	Kevin Harvick	4	25	13	19	36	7	15	2	16	29	6	13	27	25	18	3	9*	17	2	12	**1**	5	2	2	2	16	13	4*	7	6	10	7	20	34	15	2	4770
6	Ryan Newman	43	14	7	**10**	14	**22**	1	39	38	42	39	**5**	**1***	5	41	5	22	1	4	**1***	11	9	1	6	**23***	1	**9**	1	4	1	**2**	5	**29**	**3**	**5**	37	4711
7	Tony Stewart	7	20	5	5	10	26	34	25	6	41*	41	40	4	1	8	12	21	**2***	22	37	12*	11	3	23	12	27	20	3	3	4	1*	3	2*	18	9	7	4549
8	Bobby Labonte	41	16	**4**	1*	37	3	**37**	32	2	2	2	3	3	17	**2**	9	5	36	14	30	22	14	**37**	27	7	6	16	31	11	17	6	41	5	36	8	1	4377
9	Bill Elliott	32	32	14	39	9	18	43	13	13	4	20	26	22	19	24	4	16	11	31	17	5	20	15	16	5	37	4	14	13	2*	4	9	4	14	1*	8*	4303
10	Terry Labonte	30	27	16	20	24	39	16	5	14	12	**21**	21	10	7	10	25	4	15	20	5	19	18	13	11	1	8	18	20	22	16	18	6	33	30	12	15	4162
11	Kurt Busch	2	2	38	40	2	1	9	19	28	1	8	15	15	36	1	28	36	39	11	2	7	12	18	1	13	24	15	38	6	40	41	39	8	4*	17	36	4150
12	Jeff Burton	11	12	6	33	42	13	20	35	4	19	9	18	14	14	11	38	2	6	9	6	27	31	11	32	11	4	42	12	32	13	20	10	23	8	7	14	4109
13	Jamie McMurray **(R)**	31	5	32	36	22	11	10	27	39	5	22	25	13	32	14	20	37	8	40	28	3	22	36	3	4	19	10	6	16	8	7	8	15	12	35	**9**	3965
14	Rusty Wallace	25	6*	40	15	16	14	14	37	8	3	10	12	6	16	12	8	28	32	17	11	10	37	38	43	36	5	6	10	9	9	13	29	19	33	23	23	3950
15	Michael Waltrip	1*	19	3	27	5	25	17	24	23	7	12	6	16	18	5	13	11	5	28	4	16	13	7	42	37	32	26	42	1	39	14	26	38	5	37	41	3934
16	Robby Gordon	6	29	23	17	28	17	18	10	21	27	4	17	9	28	22	1*	40	7	5	18	6	1*	6	35	28	29	21	23	12	25	38	36	21	32	20	30	3856
17	Mark Martin	5	7	43	42	4	29	5	26	17	17	5	29	18	2	9	19	20	14	18	41	9	10	17	36	33	13	28	22	23	20	11	14	39	10	41	33	3769
18	Sterling Marlin	17	40	8	14	39	6	29	6	7	10	13	7	35	6*	6*	18	19	21	39	10	34	43	19	17	31	22	29	13	39	34	15	43	16	11	10	10	3745
19	Jeremy Mayfield	8	41	21	22	30	23	25	**18**	40	35	25	43	21	15	13	10	8	10	34	38	41	16	28	10	6	2	11	2	38	3	12	33	7	43	3	6	3736
20	Greg Biffle **(R)**	21	22	DNQ	13	12	5	28	22	18	18	17	16	30	20	31	37	1	20	10	27	21	30	4	22	10	20	43	7	24	12	17	19	34	15	11	35	3696
21	Ward Burton	38	18	25	18	29	33	12	7	25	21	11	10	37	8	30	16	30	19	25	19	26	6	14	13	19	15	39	29	14	21	28	18	13	41	18	32	3550
22	Elliott Sadler	23	9	42	6	**7**	21	41*	3	5	23	37	36	33	9	17	22	24	9	27	14	42	15	12	38	9	39	8	19	**30**	42	43	28	17	20	21	21	3525
23	Ricky Rudd	15	11	19	35	15	4	26	42	11	24	34	33	17	37	43	15	3	13	12	39	38	21	29	33	16	3	2	11	36	10	23	15	31	17	40	31	3521
24	Johnny Benson	19	13	12	11	25	19	32	41	32	36	15	24	5	24	26	30	27	18	26	20	13	27	10	14	40	9	25	21	41	35	16	34	24	21	29	4	3448
25	Joe Nemechek	22	23	9	9	13	27	35	21	15	32	1*	11	24	38	21	35	38	42	29	7	37	17	20	19	21	26	3	43	25	37	31	20	10	31	25	17	3426
26	Dale Jarrett	10	1	41	21	18	36	13	12	20	37	36	9	39	42	32	42	10	30	7	21	39	7	23	7	34	21	41	18	19	33	22	11	12	29	38	26	3358
27	Ricky Craven	26	4	36	12	1	15	21	4	27	15	38	38	8	10	15	21	43	25	21	40	17	28	40	8	8	30	38	40	8	41	19	32	35	38	39	29	3334
28	Dave Blaney	24	**10**	34	8	3	38	36	23	31	13	18	14	20	26	38	32	35	31	13	9	28	25	25	30	30	33	14	24	17	43	24	37	37	24	27	28	3194
29	Jimmy Spencer	40	28	17	7	21	12	33	38	19	33	42	4	29	39	29	36	12	23	15	22	8	23	26		22	36	23	15	42	15	26	38	9	40	14	25	3147
30	Kenny Wallace	16	38	30	26	23	10	23	17	12	22	29	42	23	29	25	29	15	24	38	32	24	34	42	15	24	23	36	28	20	31	32	16	30	25	31	22	3061
31	Todd Bodine	18	42	20	28	43	40	11	28	37	25	23	23	12	11	37	23	13	33	19	8	23	35	43	37	17	42	35	17	DNQ	11	29	40	42	22	16	11	2976
32	Steve Park	29	21	10	16	20	30	39	20	24	**40**	43	27	32	35	27	41	**39**	26	8	25	15	26	5	29	20	31	34	26	DNQ	22	36	12	36	39	34	19	2923
33	Tony Raines **(R)**	33	37	24	24	41	42	42	16	33	31	14	37	31	30	33	31	DNQ	22	33	16	25	41	24	20	42	35	33	30	31	26	25	23	18	19	6	13	2772
34	Jeff Green	**39**	31	27	25	19	20	7	29	26	26	40	19	25	33	28		29	16	30	31	20		21	40	18			16	18	27	27	24	DNQ	37	19	40	2656
35	Casey Mears **(R)**	27	30	15	23	34	32	27	40	36	34	28	35	40	21	20	26	25	34	16	35	29	32	41	21	35	41	17	36	37	24	42	17	28	42	33	27	2638
36	Ken Schrader	42	24	28	38	17	37	24	33	10	30	24	28	26	43	42	33	41	28	36	26	DNQ	DNQ	8	12	38	25	37	33	21	28	DNQ	22	26	27	36	DNQ	2451
37	Kyle Petty	13	35	31	34	26	34	INQ	11	34	28	27	30	43	27	34	27	23	27	32	34	40	42	16	34	27	34	30	32	DNQ	23	40	25	25	35	32	DNQ	2414
38	John Andretti	34	39	18	29	38	31	19	14	30	8	30	39	34	23					41	33	43	19				14	12	34	15	19	30	31	22	16	30	42	2379
39	Mike Skinner	37	17	39	30	11	41	40	31	35	20	35	20	36	34	DNQ						35		22	18	29	**18**	22	41	27	29	39	21				39	1960
40	Jack Sprague **(R)**	14	34	26	37	40	35	22	34	29	39	26	22	41	22	19	39	31	40																			1284
41	Larry Foyt **(R)**	DNQ	36	35	43	32	DNQ	30	DNQ	Wth	38	33	34	28	41	DNQ		34	41	DNQ	29	32	DNQ	39	39	DNQ	DNQ	DNQ	DNQ	43	DNQ			DNQ	28	28	16	1228
42	Mike Wallace	9							30				31	19	31	23		42	37	42	23						12			10	32			DNQ	26		DNQ	1189
43	Kevin Lepage												32									30		31		15			27	DNQ		21	35	14	23	42	18	877
44	Christian Fittipaldi	35						38								35	40	DNQ	29	37	24	DNQ	40	33	41	43	43	31	DNQ	28		34						857
45	Jerry Nadeau	28	26	22	31	35	28	4	36	41	14	QL																										844
46	Derrike Cope	DNQ	43	29			43			42	43	DNQ	DNQ	DNQ	DNQ	40			43	35	42	36		34	DNQ	39	Wth	DNQ	35		38	37	42	40	DNQ	43	DNQ	822
47	Jason Leffler																					33		35	26	26	28	27	25	DNQ	30	35	27					764
48	Scott Wimmer																								24			24	DNQ					32	9	26	12	599
49	Brian Vickers																															33		43	13	24	34	379
50	Hermie Sadler	DNQ					DNQ		43	43		DNQ	DNQ	Wth		36						DNQ			DNQ	41	40	40	39			DNQ	30	41	Wth	DNQ	38	373
51	Johnny Sauter																		35	23					25		38	32			DNQ							356
52	Brett Bodine	DNQ			41	31	24	31	DNQ			31	DNQ	42		QL					DNQ	DNQ		Wth			Wth											308
53	Scott Pruett																34						2															236
54	Bobby Hamilton Jr.				DNQ																										14			27				203
55	Boris Said																**6**						39															201
56	Ron Fellows																7						38															200
57	Buckshot Jones																	17												40				DNQ				160
58	Jason Keller											32							DNQ											26								152
59	Johnny Miller																24						36															146
60	David Green	DNQ							DNQ									32												35								125
61	Casey Atwood														43							31																113
62	Ron Hornaday Jr.																																				20	103
63	Hideo Fukuyama **(R)**			33							DNQ	Wth					43																					98
64	P. J. Jones																DNQ						24															91
65	Mike Bliss																	26												DNQ								85
66	Paul Menard																DNQ						29															76
67	Jason Jarrett																													29								76
68	Ted Musgrave			Wth																		DNQ			31													70
69	Morgan Shepherd														DNQ					43	43	Wth		Wth	DNQ			DNQ	DNQ	Wth			DNQ	Wth				68
70	Geoff Bodine															39																						46
71	Stacy Compton																	33						DNQ														39
72	Kirk Shelmerdine	DNQ																																				
73	Mike Harmon	DNQ																																				
74	Jeff Fultz				DNQ																											DNQ						
75	David Starr							DNQ																														
76	Kerry Earnhardt							DNQ			DNQ							DNQ																				
77	Jim Inglebright																DNQ																					
78	Brandon Ash			Wth													DNQ																		DNQ			
79	Shane Hmiel																	DNQ											Wth									
80	David Reutimann																			DNQ		DNQ																
81	Carl Long														Wth					DNQ				Wth				DNQ										
82	Tim Sauter																			DNQ									DNQ							DNQ		
83	Jim Sauter																					DNQ																
84	Robert Pressley																					DNQ																
85	Billy Bigley																					DNQ			DNQ		DNQ		DNQ					DNQ				
86	Joe Varde																						DNQ															
87	Scott Maxwell																						DNQ															
88	Mark Green																															DNQ	DNQ					
89	Shelby Howard																																	DNQ				
90	Rich Bickle																							Wth				Wth	Wth							DNQ	DNQ	
91	Norm Benning	Wth																																				
92	Kyle Busch																																				Wth	
93	Dennis Setzer									QL																												
Pos	Driver	DAY	CAR	LVS	ATL	DAR	BRI	TEX	TAL	MAR	CAL	RCH	CLT	DOV	POC	MCH	SON	DAY	CHI	NHA	POC	IND	GLN	MCH	BRI	DAR	RCH	NHA	DOV	TAL	KAN	CLT	MAR	ATL	PHO	CAR	HOM	Points

== Rookie of the Year ==
The easy favorite for Rookie of the Year heading was Jamie McMurray, who had won the previous year in just his second start, and he did not disappoint, posting thirteen top-tens and a pole position despite not winning again. Runner-up Greg Biffle finished in the top-25 in the first two races, failed to qualify at Las Vegas, then won the Pepsi 400, while Tony Raines posted just one top ten finish in BACE Motorsports' only full season in Winston Cup. Casey Mears could not finish higher than 15th in his debut season. Former Craftsman Truck Series champion Jack Sprague only lasted eighteen races before being released from his No. 0 ride, while Larry Foyt's best finish in 20 starts was a sixteenth at the season ending race at Homestead. The only other declared candidate, Hideo Fukuyama, dropped out early due to a lack of funding from his BelCar Racing team.

== See also ==
- 2003 NASCAR Busch Series
- 2003 NASCAR Craftsman Truck Series
- 2003 ARCA Re/Max Series
- 2003 NASCAR Goody's Dash Series
