= 2003 Sylvania 300 =

Race details
- Race 27 of 36 in the 2003 NASCAR Winston Cup Series season
- Date: September 14, 2003
- Location: New Hampshire International Speedway, Loudon, New Hampshire
- Course: Permanent racing facility
- Course length: 1.058 miles (1.702 km)
- Distance: 300 laps, 317.4 mi (510.805 km)
- Average speed: 106.58 miles per hour (171.52 km/h)

Pole position
Driver	Ryan Newman	Penske Racing

Most laps led
Driver	Dale Earnhardt Jr.	Dale Earnhardt, Inc.
- Laps: 120

Winner
No. 48	Jimmie Johnson	Hendrick Motorsports

Television in the United States
- Network: TNT
- Announcers: Allen Bestwick, Benny Parsons, & Wally Dallenbach Jr.

The 2003 Sylvania 300 was a NASCAR Winston Cup Series race held on September 14, 2003 at New Hampshire International Speedway, in Loudon, New Hampshire. Contested over 300 laps on the 1.058 mile (1.702 km) speedway, it was the 27th race of the 2003 NASCAR Winston Cup Series season.

Jimmie Johnson of Hendrick Motorsports won the race.

== Background ==
New Hampshire International Speedway is a 1.058-mile (1.703 km) oval speedway located in Loudon, New Hampshire which has hosted NASCAR racing annually since the early 1990s, as well as an IndyCar weekend and the oldest motorcycle race in North America, the Loudon Classic. Nicknamed "The Magic Mile", the speedway is often converted into a 1.6-mile (2.6 km) road course, which includes much of the oval. The track was originally the site of Bryar Motorsports Park before being purchased and redeveloped by Bob Bahre. The track is currently one of eight major NASCAR tracks owned and operated by Speedway Motorsports.

== Summary ==
This race marked the last time that the long-standing NASCAR rule of racing back to a yellow caution flag was in place. During the race, Dale Jarrett spun and hit the wall in turn 4 and came to rest in the middle of the racetrack's front stretch. Leaders slowed down except Michael Waltrip, who attempted to put several cars a lap down; he and others raced past Jarrett's immobilized car at full speed and some barely avoided contact with him. Beginning with the next race, the MBNA America 400 at Dover, in addition to other rule changes for the Cup, Busch, and Truck series, NASCAR outlawed racing back to the caution. Instead, NASCAR froze the field immediately at the caution and allowed the first car one lap down (or multiple laps down, if there were no cars one lap down) to rejoin the lead lap; this is officially called the "free pass" by NASCAR but is widely known by fans and journalists as the "lucky dog" rule, due to Aaron's sponsoring the free pass on television broadcasts for a number of years.

== Results ==
Pos	No.	Driver	Team	Manufacturer	Laps	Laps led	Status
1	48	Jimmie Johnson	Hendrick Motorsports	Chevrolet	300	12	Running
2	21	Ricky Rudd	Wood Brothers Racing	Ford	300	26	Running
3	25	Joe Nemechek	Hendrick Motorsports	Chevrolet	300	0	Running
4	9	Bill Elliott	Evernham Motorsports	Dodge	300	55	Running
5	8	Dale Earnhardt Jr.	Dale Earnhardt, Inc.	Chevrolet	300	120	Running
6	2	Rusty Wallace	Penske Racing	Dodge	300	0	Running
7	17	Matt Kenseth	Roush Racing	Ford	300	7	Running
8	38	Elliott Sadler	Robert Yates Racing	Ford	300	0	Running
9	12	Ryan Newman	Penske Racing	Dodge	300	47	Running
10	42	Jamie McMurray	Chip Ganassi Racing	Dodge	300	0	Running
11	19	Jeremy Mayfield	Evernham Motorsports	Dodge	300	0	Running
12	1	John Andretti	Dale Earnhardt, Inc.	Chevrolet	300	0	Running
13	29	Kevin Harvick	Richard Childress Racing	Chevrolet	300	9	Running
14	77	Dave Blaney	Jasper Motorsports	Ford	299	0	Running
15	97	Kurt Busch	Roush Racing	Ford	299	0	Running
16	18	Bobby Labonte	Joe Gibbs Racing	Chevrolet	299	0	Running
17	41	Casey Mears	Chip Ganassi Racing	Dodge	299	0	Running
18	5	Terry Labonte	Hendrick Motorsports	Chevrolet	299	0	Running
19	24	Jeff Gordon	Hendrick Motorsports	Chevrolet	299	1	Running
20	20	Tony Stewart	Joe Gibbs Racing	Chevrolet	299	0	Running
21	31	Robby Gordon	Richard Childress Racing	Chevrolet	299	4	Running
22	01	Mike Skinner	MB2 Motorsports	Pontiac	299	0	Running
23	7	Jimmy Spencer	Ultra Motorsports	Dodge	299	0	Running
24	27	Scott Wimmer	Bill Davis Racing	Dodge	299	0	Running
25	10	Johnny Benson Jr.	MB2 Motorsports	Pontiac	299	0	Running
26	15	Michael Waltrip	Dale Earnhardt, Inc.	Chevrolet	299	18	Running
27	0	Jason Leffler	Haas CNC Racing	Pontiac	298	0	Running
28	6	Mark Martin	Roush Racing	Ford	298	0	Running
29	40	Sterling Marlin	Chip Ganassi Racing	Dodge	298	0	Running
30	45	Kyle Petty	Petty Enterprises	Dodge	298	0	Running
31	43	Christian Fittipaldi	Petty Enterprises	Dodge	298	0	Running
32	4	Johnny Sauter	Morgan–McClure Motorsports	Pontiac	297	0	Running
33	74	Tony Raines	BACE Motorsports	Chevrolet	297	0	Running
34	30	Steve Park	Richard Childress Racing	Chevrolet	297	1	Running
35	54	Todd Bodine	BelCar Racing	Ford	296	0	Running
36	23	Kenny Wallace	Bill Davis Racing	Dodge	295	0	Running
37	49	Ken Schrader	BAM Racing	Dodge	292	0	Running
38	32	Ricky Craven	PPI Motorsports	Pontiac	291	0	Running
39	22	Ward Burton	Bill Davis Racing	Dodge	270	0	Crash
40	02	Hermie Sadler	SCORE Motorsports	Pontiac	179	0	Engine
41	88	Dale Jarrett	Robert Yates Racing	Ford	159	0	Crash
42	99	Jeff Burton	Roush Racing	Ford	117	0	Engine
43	16	Greg Biffle	Roush Racing	Ford	108	0	Engine

=== Failed to qualify ===
- Derrike Cope (#37)
- Carl Long (#46)
- Larry Foyt (#50)
- Morgan Shepherd (#89)
- Rich Bickle (#79) (withdrawn)

== Race Statistics ==
- Time of race: 2:58:41
- Average Speed: 106.58 miles per hour (171.52 km/h)
- Pole Speed: 133.357 miles per hour (214.617 km/h)
- Cautions: 6 for 38 laps
- Margin of Victory: 6.240 sec
- Lead changes: 20
- Percent of race run under caution: 12.7%
- Average green flag run: 37.4 laps

Lap leaders
Laps	Leader
1–45	Ryan Newman
46–83	Dale Earnhardt Jr.
84–85	Michael Waltrip
86	Jimmie Johnson
87–88	Matt Kenseth
89	Robby Gordon
90	Steve Park
91–126	Dale Earnhardt Jr.
127	Ryan Newman
128–146	Bill Elliott
147	Ryan Newman
148–183	Bill Elliott
184–229	Dale Earnhardt Jr.
230–255	Ricky Rudd
256–271	Michael Waltrip
272–275	Jimmie Johnson
276	Jeff Gordon
277–285	Kevin Harvick
286–290	Matt Kenseth
291–293	Robby Gordon
294–300	Jimmie Johnson

Total laps led
Laps led	Driver
120	Dale Earnhardt Jr.
55	Bill Elliott
47	Ryan Newman
26	Ricky Rudd
18	Michael Waltrip
12	Jimmie Johnson
9	Kevin Harvick
7	Matt Kenseth
4	Robby Gordon
1	Jeff Gordon
1	Steve Park

Cautions: 6 for 38 laps
Laps	Reason
127–138	Debris
148–151	#22 (W. Burton) accident turn 1
156–159	#31 (R. Gordon) spin backstraight
162–171	#88 (Jarrett) accident turn 4
184–187	Oil on track
196–199	#20 (Stewart) accident turn 2
