= 2003 Tropicana 400 =

18th race of the 2003 NASCAR Winston Cup Series

Race details
- Race 18 of 36 in the 2003 NASCAR Sprint Cup Series
- The 2003 Tropicana 400 program cover.
- Date: July 13, 2003
- Official name: 3rd Annual Tropicana 400
- Location: Joliet, Illinois, Chicagoland Speedway
- Course: Permanent racing facility
- Course length: 1.5 miles (2.41 km)
- Distance: 267 laps, 400.5 mi (644.542 km)
- Scheduled distance: 267 laps, 400.5 mi (644.542 km)
- Average speed: 134.059 miles per hour (215.747 km/h)
- Attendance: 85,000

Pole position
Driver	Tony Stewart	Joe Gibbs Racing
- Time: 29.223

Most laps led
Driver	Tony Stewart	Joe Gibbs Racing
- Laps: 80

Winner
No. 12	Ryan Newman	Penske Racing South

Television in the United States
- Network: NBC
- Announcers: Allen Bestwick, Benny Parsons, Wally Dallenbach Jr.

Radio in the United States
- Radio: Motor Racing Network

The 2003 Tropicana 400 was the stock car race of the 2003 NASCAR Winston Cup Series season and the third iteration of the event. The race was held on Sunday, July 13, 2003, in Joliet, Illinois, at Chicagoland Speedway, a 1.5 miles (2.41 km) tri-oval speedway. The race took the scheduled 267 laps to complete. At race's end, Penske Racing South driver Ryan Newman would stretch out his fuel mileage well enough to coast to the line and win his fourth career NASCAR Winston Cup Series win and his third of the season. To fill out the podium, Tony Stewart of Joe Gibbs Racing and Jimmie Johnson of Hendrick Motorsports would finish second and third, respectively.

== Background ==
The layout of Chicagoland Speedway, the venue where the race was held.

Chicagoland Speedway is a 1.5 miles (2.41 km) tri-oval speedway in Joliet, Illinois, southwest of Chicago and it's owned by NASCAR.

=== Entry list ===
#	Driver	Team	Make
0	Jack Sprague	Haas CNC Racing	Pontiac
1	Jeff Green	Dale Earnhardt, Inc.	Chevrolet
01	Mike Wallace	MB2 Motorsports	Pontiac
2	Rusty Wallace	Penske Racing South	Dodge
4	Johnny Sauter	Morgan–McClure Motorsports	Pontiac
5	Terry Labonte	Hendrick Motorsports	Chevrolet
6	Mark Martin	Roush Racing	Ford
7	Jimmy Spencer	Ultra Motorsports	Dodge
8	Dale Earnhardt Jr.	Dale Earnhardt, Inc.	Chevrolet
9	Bill Elliott	Evernham Motorsports	Dodge
10	Johnny Benson Jr.	MB2 Motorsports	Pontiac
12	Ryan Newman	Penske Racing South	Dodge
14	Larry Foyt	A. J. Foyt Enterprises	Dodge
15	Michael Waltrip	Dale Earnhardt, Inc.	Chevrolet
16	Greg Biffle	Roush Racing	Ford
17	Matt Kenseth	Roush Racing	Ford
18	Bobby Labonte	Joe Gibbs Racing	Chevrolet
19	Jeremy Mayfield	Evernham Motorsports	Dodge
20	Tony Stewart	Joe Gibbs Racing	Chevrolet
21	Ricky Rudd	Wood Brothers Racing	Ford
22	Ward Burton	Bill Davis Racing	Dodge
23	Kenny Wallace	Bill Davis Racing	Dodge
24	Jeff Gordon	Hendrick Motorsports	Chevrolet
25	Joe Nemechek	Hendrick Motorsports	Chevrolet
29	Kevin Harvick	Richard Childress Racing	Chevrolet
30	Steve Park	Richard Childress Racing	Chevrolet
31	Robby Gordon	Richard Childress Racing	Chevrolet
32	Ricky Craven	PPI Motorsports	Pontiac
37	Derrike Cope	Quest Motor Racing	Chevrolet
38	Elliott Sadler	Robert Yates Racing	Ford
40	Sterling Marlin	Chip Ganassi Racing	Dodge
41	Casey Mears	Chip Ganassi Racing	Dodge
42	Jamie McMurray	Chip Ganassi Racing	Dodge
43	John Andretti	Petty Enterprises	Dodge
45	Kyle Petty	Petty Enterprises	Dodge
48	Jimmie Johnson	Hendrick Motorsports	Chevrolet
49	Ken Schrader	BAM Racing	Dodge
54	Todd Bodine	BelCar Motorsports	Ford
74	Tony Raines	BACE Motorsports	Chevrolet
77	Dave Blaney	Jasper Motorsports	Ford
81	Jason Keller	Dale Earnhardt, Inc.	Chevrolet
88	Dale Jarrett	Robert Yates Racing	Ford
97	Kurt Busch	Roush Racing	Ford
99	Jeff Burton	Roush Racing	Ford
Official entry list

== Practice ==
=== First practice ===
The first practice session was held on Friday, July 11, at 11:20 AM CST, and would last for 2 hours. Jimmie Johnson of Hendrick Motorsports would set the fastest time in the session, with a lap of 29.324 and an average speed of 184.150 miles per hour (296.361 km/h).

Pos.	#	Driver	Team	Make	Time	Speed
1	48	Jimmie Johnson	Hendrick Motorsports	Chevrolet	29.324	184.150
2	24	Jeff Gordon	Hendrick Motorsports	Chevrolet	29.376	183.824
3	20	Tony Stewart	Joe Gibbs Racing	Chevrolet	29.404	183.648
Full first practice results

=== Second practice ===
The second practice session was held on Saturday, July 12, at 9:30 AM CST, and would last for 45 minutes. Tony Stewart of Joe Gibbs Racing would set the fastest time in the session, with a lap of 30.242 and an average speed of 178.560 miles per hour (287.364 km/h).

Pos.	#	Driver	Team	Make	Time	Speed
1	20	Tony Stewart	Joe Gibbs Racing	Chevrolet	30.242	178.560
2	12	Ryan Newman	Penske Racing South	Dodge	30.255	178.483
3	40	Sterling Marlin	Chip Ganassi Racing	Dodge	30.310	178.159
Full second practice results

=== Third and final practice ===
The third and final practice session, sometimes referred to as Happy Hour, was held on Saturday, July 12, at 11:10 AM CST, and would last for 45 minutes. Jimmie Johnson of Hendrick Motorsports would set the fastest time in the session, with a lap of 30.231 and an average speed of 178.625 miles per hour (287.469 km/h).

Pos.	#	Driver	Team	Make	Time	Speed
1	48	Jimmie Johnson	Hendrick Motorsports	Chevrolet	30.231	178.625
2	12	Ryan Newman	Penske Racing South	Dodge	30.353	177.907
3	20	Tony Stewart	Joe Gibbs Racing	Chevrolet	30.405	177.602
Full Happy Hour practice results

== Qualifying ==
Qualifying was held on Friday, July 11, at 3:05 PM CST. Each driver would have two laps to set a fastest time; the fastest of the two would count as their official qualifying lap. The session would commence after a near two-hour rain delay. Positions 1-36 would be decided on time, while positions 37-43 would be based on provisionals. Six spots are awarded by the use of provisionals based on owner's points. The seventh is awarded to a past champion who has not otherwise qualified for the race. If no past champ needs the provisional, the next team in the owner points will be awarded a provisional.

Tony Stewart of Joe Gibbs Racing would win the pole, setting a time of 29.223 and an average speed of 184.786 miles per hour (297.384 km/h).

Jason Keller would be the only driver to fail to qualify.

=== Full qualifying results ===
Pos.	#	Driver	Team	Make	Time	Speed
1	20	Tony Stewart	Joe Gibbs Racing	Chevrolet	29.223	184.786
2	24	Jeff Gordon	Hendrick Motorsports	Chevrolet	29.277	184.445
3	9	Bill Elliott	Evernham Motorsports	Dodge	29.284	184.401
4	41	Casey Mears	Chip Ganassi Racing	Dodge	29.306	184.263
5	19	Jeremy Mayfield	Evernham Motorsports	Dodge	29.365	183.892
6	48	Jimmie Johnson	Hendrick Motorsports	Chevrolet	29.392	183.723
7	16	Greg Biffle	Roush Racing	Ford	29.428	183.499
8	38	Elliott Sadler	Robert Yates Racing	Ford	29.436	183.449
9	77	Dave Blaney	Jasper Motorsports	Ford	29.439	183.430
10	42	Jamie McMurray	Chip Ganassi Racing	Dodge	29.476	183.200
11	29	Kevin Harvick	Richard Childress Racing	Chevrolet	29.482	183.163
12	15	Michael Waltrip	Dale Earnhardt, Inc.	Chevrolet	29.485	183.144
13	6	Mark Martin	Roush Racing	Ford	29.533	182.846
14	12	Ryan Newman	Penske Racing South	Dodge	29.538	182.815
15	1	Jeff Green	Dale Earnhardt, Inc.	Chevrolet	29.540	182.803
16	8	Dale Earnhardt Jr.	Dale Earnhardt, Inc.	Chevrolet	29.574	182.593
17	25	Joe Nemechek	Hendrick Motorsports	Chevrolet	29.574	182.593
18	18	Bobby Labonte	Joe Gibbs Racing	Chevrolet	29.575	182.587
19	40	Sterling Marlin	Chip Ganassi Racing	Dodge	29.631	182.242
20	4	Johnny Sauter	Morgan–McClure Motorsports	Pontiac	29.673	181.984
21	7	Jimmy Spencer	Ultra Motorsports	Dodge	29.729	181.641
22	2	Rusty Wallace	Penske Racing South	Dodge	29.738	181.586
23	30	Steve Park	Richard Childress Racing	Chevrolet	29.753	181.494
24	17	Matt Kenseth	Roush Racing	Ford	29.757	181.470
25	37	Derrike Cope	Quest Motor Racing	Chevrolet	29.764	181.427
26	32	Ricky Craven	PPI Motorsports	Pontiac	29.774	181.366
27	99	Jeff Burton	Roush Racing	Ford	29.787	181.287
28	5	Terry Labonte	Hendrick Motorsports	Chevrolet	29.796	181.232
29	74	Tony Raines	BACE Motorsports	Chevrolet	29.823	181.068
30	22	Ward Burton	Bill Davis Racing	Dodge	29.836	180.989
31	14	Larry Foyt	A. J. Foyt Enterprises	Dodge	29.846	180.929
32	97	Kurt Busch	Roush Racing	Ford	29.848	180.917
33	88	Dale Jarrett	Robert Yates Racing	Ford	29.850	180.904
34	0	Jack Sprague	Haas CNC Racing	Pontiac	29.862	180.832
35	31	Robby Gordon	Richard Childress Racing	Chevrolet	29.885	180.693
36	10	Johnny Benson Jr.	MB2 Motorsports	Pontiac	29.893	180.644
Provisionals
37	21	Ricky Rudd	Wood Brothers Racing	Ford	29.972	180.168
38	23	Kenny Wallace	Bill Davis Racing	Dodge	29.902	180.590
39	54	Todd Bodine	BelCar Racing	Ford	29.988	180.072
40	01	Mike Wallace	MB2 Motorsports	Pontiac	29.953	180.282
41	45	Kyle Petty	Petty Enterprises	Dodge	29.954	180.276
42	43	Christian Fittipaldi	Petty Enterprises	Dodge	30.083	179.503
43	49	Ken Schrader	BAM Racing	Dodge	29.963	180.222
Failed to qualify
44	81	Jason Keller	Dale Earnhardt, Inc.	Chevrolet	29.948	180.312
Official qualifying results

== Race results ==
Fin	St	#	Driver	Team	Make	Laps	Led	Status	Pts	Winnings
1	14	12	Ryan Newman	Penske Racing South	Dodge	267	67	running	180	$191,000
2	1	20	Tony Stewart	Joe Gibbs Racing	Chevrolet	267	80	running	180	$213,468
3	6	48	Jimmie Johnson	Hendrick Motorsports	Chevrolet	267	25	running	170	$134,575
4	2	24	Jeff Gordon	Hendrick Motorsports	Chevrolet	267	47	running	165	$158,178
5	12	15	Michael Waltrip	Dale Earnhardt, Inc.	Chevrolet	267	1	running	160	$100,975
6	27	99	Jeff Burton	Roush Racing	Ford	267	0	running	150	$114,092
7	35	31	Robby Gordon	Richard Childress Racing	Chevrolet	267	0	running	146	$106,812
8	10	42	Jamie McMurray	Chip Ganassi Racing	Dodge	267	1	running	147	$77,375
9	8	38	Elliott Sadler	Robert Yates Racing	Ford	267	0	running	138	$108,375
10	5	19	Jeremy Mayfield	Evernham Motorsports	Dodge	267	0	running	134	$85,075
11	3	9	Bill Elliott	Evernham Motorsports	Dodge	267	0	running	130	$106,908
12	24	17	Matt Kenseth	Roush Racing	Ford	266	0	0running	127	$87,725
13	37	21	Ricky Rudd	Wood Brothers Racing	Ford	266	0	running	124	$94,475
14	13	6	Mark Martin	Roush Racing	Ford	266	0	running	121	$103,883
15	28	5	Terry Labonte	Hendrick Motorsports	Chevrolet	266	0	running	118	$96,356
16	15	1	Jeff Green	Dale Earnhardt, Inc.	Chevrolet	266	0	running	115	$89,937
17	11	29	Kevin Harvick	Richard Childress Racing	Chevrolet	266	46	running	92	$104,028
18	36	10	Johnny Benson Jr.	MB2 Motorsports	Pontiac	265	0	running	109	$94,700
19	30	22	Ward Burton	Bill Davis Racing	Dodge	265	0	running	106	$100,106
20	7	16	Greg Biffle	Roush Racing	Ford	265	0	running	103	$69,650
21	19	40	Sterling Marlin	Chip Ganassi Racing	Dodge	265	0	running	100	$107,650
22	29	74	Tony Raines	BACE Motorsports	Chevrolet	265	0	running	97	$63,450
23	21	7	Jimmy Spencer	Ultra Motorsports	Dodge	265	0	running	94	$82,550
24	38	23	Kenny Wallace	Bill Davis Racing	Dodge	265	0	running	91	$79,325
25	26	32	Ricky Craven	PPI Motorsports	Pontiac	265	0	running	88	$84,925
26	23	30	Steve Park	Richard Childress Racing	Chevrolet	265	0	running	85	$73,725
27	41	45	Kyle Petty	Petty Enterprises	Dodge	264	0	running	82	$73,425
28	43	49	Ken Schrader	BAM Racing	Dodge	263	0	running	79	$73,614
29	42	43	Christian Fittipaldi	Petty Enterprises	Dodge	263	0	running	76	$100,303
30	33	88	Dale Jarrett	Robert Yates Racing	Ford	263	0	running	73	$108,063
31	9	77	Dave Blaney	Jasper Motorsports	Ford	262	0	running	70	$69,575
32	22	2	Rusty Wallace	Penske Racing South	Dodge	249	0	running	67	$96,042
33	39	54	Todd Bodine	BelCar Racing	Ford	237	0	transmission	64	$62,075
34	4	41	Casey Mears	Chip Ganassi Racing	Dodge	232	0	crash	61	$68,975
35	20	4	Johnny Sauter	Morgan–McClure Motorsports	Pontiac	213	0	running	58	$60,775
36	18	18	Bobby Labonte	Joe Gibbs Racing	Chevrolet	212	0	crash	55	$105,658
37	40	01	Mike Wallace	MB2 Motorsports	Pontiac	211	0	crash	52	$60,375
38	16	8	Dale Earnhardt Jr.	Dale Earnhardt, Inc.	Chevrolet	206	0	crash	49	$101,092
39	32	97	Kurt Busch	Roush Racing	Ford	124	0	engine	46	$79,985
40	34	0	Jack Sprague	Haas CNC Racing	Pontiac	117	0	engine	43	$59,785
41	31	14	Larry Foyt	A. J. Foyt Enterprises	Dodge	88	0	crash	40	$59,590
42	17	25	Joe Nemechek	Hendrick Motorsports	Chevrolet	45	0	engine	37	$59,395
43	25	37	Derrike Cope	Quest Motor Racing	Chevrolet	6	0	transmission	34	$59,457
Failed to qualify
44		81	Jason Keller	Dale Earnhardt, Inc.	Chevrolet					
Official race results

Previous race: 2003 Pepsi 400	NASCAR Winston Cup Series; 2003 season	Next race: 2003 New England 300
