= 2003 Coca-Cola 600 =

Auto race run in North Carolina in 2003

Race details
- Race 12 of 36 in the 2003 NASCAR Winston Cup Series
- Layout of Lowe's Motor Speedway
- Date: May 25, 2003
- Location: Lowe's Motor Speedway, Concord, North Carolina
- Course: Permanent racing facility
- Course length: 1.5 miles (2.414 km)
- Distance: 276 laps, 414 mi (666.268 km)
- Scheduled distance: 400 laps, 600 mi (965.606 km)
- Average speed: 126.198 mph (203.096 km/h)
- Attendance: 165,000

Pole position
Driver	Ryan Newman	Penske Racing
- Time: 29.140

Most laps led
Driver	Matt Kenseth	Roush Racing
- Laps: 82

Winner
No. 48	Jimmie Johnson	Hendrick Motorsports

Television in the United States
- Network: Fox
- Announcers: Mike Joy, Darrell Waltrip, Larry McReynolds

The 2003 Coca-Cola 600, the 44th running of the race, was a NASCAR Winston Cup Series race held on May 25, 2003, at Lowe's Motor Speedway in Charlotte, North Carolina. The race was the 12th of the 2003 NASCAR Winston Cup Series season. The race was scheduled for 400 laps but was shortened to 276 laps because of rain. Jimmie Johnson of Hendrick Motorsports won the race, his first win of the season, and also at Charlotte. Matt Kenseth finished 2nd and Bobby Labonte finished 3rd.

Failed to qualify: Hermie Sadler (No. 02), Brett Bodine (No. 11), Derrike Cope (No. 37)

On the day of the race, 0.55 inches of precipitation were recorded around the speedway.

== Background ==
Lowe's Motor Speedway, the track where the race was held.

Lowe's Motor Speedway is a motorsports complex located in Concord, North Carolina, United States 13 miles from Charlotte, North Carolina. The complex features a 1.5-mile (2.4-kilometre) quad oval track that hosts NASCAR racing including the prestigious Coca-Cola 600 on Memorial Day weekend and The Winston, as well as the UAW-GM Quality 500. The speedway was built in 1959 by Bruton Smith and is considered the home track for NASCAR with many race teams located in the Charlotte area. The track is owned and operated by Speedway Motorsports Inc. (SMI) with Marcus G. Smith (son of Bruton Smith) as track president.

== Results ==
Pos	Grid	No.	Driver	Team	Manufacturer	Laps	Laps Lead	Status	Points
1	37	48	Jimmie Johnson	Hendrick Motorsports	Chevrolet	276	34	Running	180
2	18	17	Matt Kenseth	Roush Racing	Ford	276	82	Running	180
3	11	18	Bobby Labonte	Joe Gibbs Racing	Chevrolet	276	39	Running	170
4	14	7	Jimmy Spencer	Ultra Motorsports	Dodge	276	0	Running	160
5	1	12	Ryan Newman	Penske Racing	Dodge	276	50	Running	160
6	9	15	Michael Waltrip	Dale Earnhardt, Inc.	Chevrolet	276	0	Running	150
7	36	40	Sterling Marlin	Chip Ganassi Racing	Dodge	276	0	Running	146
8	4	24	Jeff Gordon	Hendrick Motorsports	Chevrolet	276	0	Running	142
9	23	88	Dale Jarrett	Robert Yates Racing	Ford	275	0	Running	138
10	41	22	Ward Burton	Bill Davis Racing	Dodge	275	0	Running	134
11	7	25	Joe Nemechek	Hendrick Motorsports	Chevrolet	275	0	Running	130
12	34	2	Rusty Wallace	Penske Racing	Dodge	275	0	Running	127
13	20	29	Kevin Harvick	Richard Childress Racing	Chevrolet	275	1	Running	129
14	8	77	Dave Blaney	Jasper Motorsports	Ford	275	0	Running	121
15	12	97	Kurt Busch	Roush Racing	Ford	275	1	Running	123
16	26	16	Greg Biffle	Roush Racing	Ford	275	0	Running	115

=== Race statistics ===
- Time of race: 3:16:50
- Average Speed: 126.198 miles per hour (203.096 km/h)
- Pole Speed: 185.312 miles per hour (298.231 km/h)
- Cautions: 8 for 46 laps
- Margin of Victory: under caution
- Lead changes: 16 among 8 drivers
- Percent of race run under caution: 16.7%
- Average green flag run: 39.9 laps

Previous race: 2003 Pontiac Excitement 400	Winston Cup Series; 2003 season	Next race: 2003 MBNA Armed Forces Family 400
