= 2003 Pennsylvania 500 =

20th race of the 2003 NASCAR Winston Cup Series

Race details
- Race 20 of 36 in the 2003 NASCAR Winston Cup Series
- The 2003 Pennsylvania 500 program cover.
- Date: July 27, 2003
- Official name: 31st Annual Pennsylvania 500
- Location: Long Pond, Pennsylvania, Pocono Raceway
- Course: Permanent racing facility
- Course length: 2.5 miles (4.0 km)
- Distance: 200 laps, 500 mi (804.672 km)
- Scheduled distance: 200 laps, 500 mi (804.672 km)
- Average speed: 127.705 miles per hour (205.521 km/h)
- Attendance: 100,000

Pole position
Driver	Ryan Newman	Penske Racing South
- Time: 52.830

Most laps led
Driver	Ryan Newman	Penske Racing South
- Laps: 88

Winner
No. 12	Ryan Newman	Penske Racing South

Television in the United States
- Network: TNT
- Announcers: Allen Bestwick, Benny Parsons, Wally Dallenbach Jr.

Radio in the United States
- Radio: Motor Racing Network

The 2003 Pennsylvania 500 was the 20th stock car race of the 2003 NASCAR Winston Cup Series season and the 31st iteration of the event. The race was held on Sunday, July 27, 2003, before a crowd of 100,000 in Long Pond, Pennsylvania, at Pocono Raceway, a 2.5 miles (4.0 km) triangular permanent course. The race took the scheduled 200 laps to complete. At race's end, Ryan Newman of Penske Racing South would manage to hold off eventual-second-place finisher Kurt Busch of Roush Racing to win his fifth career NASCAR Winston Cup Series and his fourth win of the year. To fill out the podium, Dale Earnhardt Jr. of Dale Earnhardt, Inc. would finish third.

== Background ==
The layout of Pocono Raceway, the venue where the race was held.

The race was held at Pocono Raceway, which is a three-turn superspeedway located in Long Pond, Pennsylvania.

Pocono Raceway is one of a very few NASCAR tracks not owned by either Speedway Motorsports or NASCAR. It is operated by the Igdalsky siblings Brandon, Nicholas, and sister Ashley, and cousins Joseph IV and Chase Mattioli, all of whom are third-generation members of the family-owned Mattco Inc, started by Joseph II and Rose Mattioli.

=== Entry list ===
#	Driver	Team	Make
0	John Andretti	Haas CNC Racing	Pontiac
1	Jeff Green	Dale Earnhardt, Inc.	Chevrolet
01	Mike Wallace	MB2 Motorsports	Pontiac
2	Rusty Wallace	Penske Racing South	Dodge
4	Brett Bodine	Morgan–McClure Motorsports	Pontiac
5	Terry Labonte	Hendrick Motorsports	Chevrolet
6	Mark Martin	Roush Racing	Ford
7	Jimmy Spencer	Ultra Motorsports	Dodge
8	Dale Earnhardt Jr.	Dale Earnhardt, Inc.	Chevrolet
9	Bill Elliott	Evernham Motorsports	Dodge
10	Johnny Benson Jr.	MB2 Motorsports	Pontiac
12	Ryan Newman	Penske Racing South	Dodge
15	Michael Waltrip	Dale Earnhardt, Inc.	Chevrolet
16	Greg Biffle	Roush Racing	Ford
17	Matt Kenseth	Roush Racing	Ford
18	Bobby Labonte	Joe Gibbs Racing	Chevrolet
19	Jeremy Mayfield	Evernham Motorsports	Dodge
20	Tony Stewart	Joe Gibbs Racing	Chevrolet
21	Ricky Rudd	Wood Brothers Racing	Ford
22	Ward Burton	Bill Davis Racing	Dodge
23	Kenny Wallace	Bill Davis Racing	Dodge
24	Jeff Gordon	Hendrick Motorsports	Chevrolet
25	Joe Nemechek	Hendrick Motorsports	Chevrolet
29	Kevin Harvick	Richard Childress Racing	Chevrolet
30	Steve Park	Richard Childress Racing	Chevrolet
31	Robby Gordon	Richard Childress Racing	Chevrolet
32	Ricky Craven	PPI Motorsports	Pontiac
37	Derrike Cope	Quest Motor Racing	Chevrolet
38	Elliott Sadler	Robert Yates Racing	Ford
40	Sterling Marlin	Chip Ganassi Racing	Dodge
41	Casey Mears	Chip Ganassi Racing	Dodge
42	Jamie McMurray	Chip Ganassi Racing	Dodge
43	Christian Fittipaldi	Petty Enterprises	Dodge
45	Kyle Petty	Petty Enterprises	Dodge
48	Jimmie Johnson	Hendrick Motorsports	Chevrolet
49	Ken Schrader	BAM Racing	Dodge
50	Larry Foyt	A. J. Foyt Enterprises	Dodge
54	Todd Bodine	BelCar Motorsports	Ford
74	Tony Raines	BACE Motorsports	Chevrolet
77	Dave Blaney	Jasper Motorsports	Ford
88	Dale Jarrett	Robert Yates Racing	Ford
89	Morgan Shepherd	Shepherd Racing Ventures	Ford
97	Kurt Busch	Roush Racing	Ford
99	Jeff Burton	Roush Racing	Ford
Official entry list

== Practice ==
=== First practice ===
The first practice session was held on Friday, July 25, at 11:20 AM EST, and would last for 2 hours. Ryan Newman of Penske Racing South would set the fastest time in the session, with a lap of 53.224 and an average speed of 169.097 miles per hour (272.135 km/h).

Pos.	#	Driver	Team	Make	Time	Speed
1	12	Ryan Newman	Penske Racing South	Dodge	53.224	169.097
2	48	Jimmie Johnson	Hendrick Motorsports	Chevrolet	53.269	168.954
3	40	Sterling Marlin	Chip Ganassi Racing	Dodge	53.560	168.036
Full first practice results

=== Second practice ===
The second practice session was held on Saturday, July 26, at 9:30 AM EST, and would last for 45 minutes. Tony Stewart of Joe Gibbs Racing would set the fastest time in the session, with a lap of 54.251 and an average speed of 165.896 miles per hour (266.984 km/h).

Pos.	#	Driver	Team	Make	Time	Speed
1	20	Tony Stewart	Joe Gibbs Racing	Chevrolet	54.251	165.896
2	97	Kurt Busch	Roush Racing	Ford	54.468	165.235
3	42	Jamie McMurray	Chip Ganassi Racing	Dodge	54.480	165.198
Full second practice results

=== Third and final practice ===
The third and final practice session, sometimes referred to as Happy Hour, was held on Saturday, July 26, at 11:15 AM EST, and would last for 45 minutes. Ryan Newman of Penske Racing South would set the fastest time in the session, with a lap of 53.224 and an average speed of 169.097 miles per hour (272.135 km/h).

Pos.	#	Driver	Team	Make	Time	Speed
1	12	Ryan Newman	Penske Racing South	Dodge	54.732	164.438
2	99	Jeff Burton	Roush Racing	Ford	54.796	164.246
3	1	Jeff Green	Dale Earnhardt, Inc.	Chevrolet	54.850	164.084
Full Happy Hour practice results

== Qualifying ==
Qualifying was held on Friday, July 25, at 3:05 PM EST. Each driver would have two laps to set a fastest time; the fastest of the two would count as their official qualifying lap. Positions 1-36 would be decided on time, while positions 37-43 would be based on provisionals. Six spots are awarded by the use of provisionals based on owner's points. The seventh is awarded to a past champion who has not otherwise qualified for the race. If no past champ needs the provisional, the next team in the owner points will be awarded a provisional.

Ryan Newman of Penske Racing South would win the pole, setting a time of 52.830 and an average speed of 170.358 miles per hour (274.165 km/h).

Brett Bodine would be the only driver to fail to qualify.

=== Full qualifying results ===
Pos.	#	Driver	Team	Make	Time	Speed
1	12	Ryan Newman	Penske Racing South	Dodge	52.830	170.358
2	48	Jimmie Johnson	Hendrick Motorsports	Chevrolet	52.997	169.821
3	38	Elliott Sadler	Robert Yates Racing	Ford	53.177	169.246
4	18	Bobby Labonte	Joe Gibbs Racing	Chevrolet	53.276	168.932
5	0	John Andretti	Haas CNC Racing	Pontiac	53.278	168.925
6	5	Terry Labonte	Hendrick Motorsports	Chevrolet	53.331	168.757
7	2	Rusty Wallace	Penske Racing South	Dodge	53.346	168.710
8	88	Dale Jarrett	Robert Yates Racing	Ford	53.371	168.631
9	17	Matt Kenseth	Roush Racing	Ford	53.403	168.530
10	41	Casey Mears	Chip Ganassi Racing	Dodge	53.445	168.397
11	9	Bill Elliott	Evernham Motorsports	Dodge	53.478	168.294
12	42	Jamie McMurray	Chip Ganassi Racing	Dodge	53.479	168.290
13	97	Kurt Busch	Roush Racing	Ford	53.532	168.124
14	6	Mark Martin	Roush Racing	Ford	53.546	168.080
15	19	Jeremy Mayfield	Evernham Motorsports	Dodge	53.546	168.080
16	30	Steve Park	Richard Childress Racing	Chevrolet	53.579	167.976
17	15	Michael Waltrip	Dale Earnhardt, Inc.	Chevrolet	53.588	167.948
18	8	Dale Earnhardt Jr.	Dale Earnhardt, Inc.	Chevrolet	53.640	167.785
19	99	Jeff Burton	Roush Racing	Ford	53.666	167.704
20	40	Sterling Marlin	Chip Ganassi Racing	Dodge	53.677	167.670
21	7	Jimmy Spencer	Ultra Motorsports	Dodge	53.691	167.626
22	77	Dave Blaney	Jasper Motorsports	Ford	53.694	167.617
23	54	Todd Bodine	BelCar Racing	Ford	53.711	167.563
24	16	Greg Biffle	Roush Racing	Ford	53.746	167.454
25	24	Jeff Gordon	Hendrick Motorsports	Chevrolet	53.748	167.448
26	25	Joe Nemechek	Hendrick Motorsports	Chevrolet	53.770	167.380
27	21	Ricky Rudd	Wood Brothers Racing	Ford	53.774	167.367
28	23	Kenny Wallace	Bill Davis Racing	Dodge	53.802	167.280
29	10	Johnny Benson Jr.	MB2 Motorsports	Pontiac	53.812	167.249
30	74	Tony Raines	BACE Motorsports	Chevrolet	53.870	167.069
31	29	Kevin Harvick	Richard Childress Racing	Chevrolet	53.872	167.063
32	32	Ricky Craven	PPI Motorsports	Pontiac	53.874	167.057
33	20	Tony Stewart	Joe Gibbs Racing	Chevrolet	53.916	166.926
34	49	Ken Schrader	BAM Racing	Dodge	53.955	166.806
35	45	Kyle Petty	Petty Enterprises	Dodge	54.026	166.587
36	43	Christian Fittipaldi	Petty Enterprises	Dodge	54.076	166.432
Provisionals
37	31	Robby Gordon	Richard Childress Racing	Chevrolet	54.233	165.951
38	22	Ward Burton	Bill Davis Racing	Dodge	54.085	166.405
39	1	Jeff Green	Dale Earnhardt, Inc.	Chevrolet	54.206	166.033
40	01	Mike Wallace	MB2 Motorsports	Pontiac	54.559	164.959
41	37	Derrike Cope	Quest Motor Racing	Chevrolet	55.141	163.218
42	89	Morgan Shepherd	Shepherd Racing Ventures	Ford	55.604	161.859
43	50	Larry Foyt	A. J. Foyt Enterprises	Dodge	54.468	165.235
Failed to qualify or withdrew
44	4	Brett Bodine	Morgan–McClure Motorsports	Pontiac	54.274	165.825
Official qualifying results

== Race results ==
Fin	St	#	Driver	Team	Make	Laps	Led	Status	Pts	Winnings
1	1	12	Ryan Newman	Penske Racing South	Dodge	200	88	running	185	$180,575
2	13	97	Kurt Busch	Roush Racing	Ford	200	1	running	175	$152,695
3	18	8	Dale Earnhardt Jr.	Dale Earnhardt, Inc.	Chevrolet	200	25	running	170	$131,037
4	17	15	Michael Waltrip	Dale Earnhardt, Inc.	Chevrolet	200	18	running	165	$94,355
5	6	5	Terry Labonte	Hendrick Motorsports	Chevrolet	200	0	running	155	$100,581
6	19	99	Jeff Burton	Roush Racing	Ford	200	17	running	155	$97,107
7	26	25	Joe Nemechek	Hendrick Motorsports	Chevrolet	200	0	running	146	$65,190
8	23	54	Todd Bodine	BelCar Racing	Ford	200	0	running	142	$76,390
9	22	77	Dave Blaney	Jasper Motorsports	Ford	200	0	running	138	$79,390
10	20	40	Sterling Marlin	Chip Ganassi Racing	Dodge	200	0	running	134	$97,790
11	7	2	Rusty Wallace	Penske Racing South	Dodge	200	23	running	135	$88,107
12	31	29	Kevin Harvick	Richard Childress Racing	Chevrolet	200	0	running	127	$88,428
13	9	17	Matt Kenseth	Roush Racing	Ford	200	2	running	129	$68,590
14	3	38	Elliott Sadler	Robert Yates Racing	Ford	200	0	running	121	$85,240
15	2	48	Jimmie Johnson	Hendrick Motorsports	Chevrolet	200	0	running	118	$67,840
16	30	74	Tony Raines	BACE Motorsports	Chevrolet	200	0	running	115	$47,490
17	11	9	Bill Elliott	Evernham Motorsports	Dodge	200	0	running	112	$85,123
18	37	31	Robby Gordon	Richard Childress Racing	Chevrolet	200	0	running	109	$74,977
19	38	22	Ward Burton	Bill Davis Racing	Dodge	200	0	running	106	$81,896
20	29	10	Johnny Benson Jr.	MB2 Motorsports	Pontiac	200	1	running	108	$78,265
21	8	88	Dale Jarrett	Robert Yates Racing	Ford	200	0	running	100	$91,168
22	21	7	Jimmy Spencer	Ultra Motorsports	Dodge	200	3	running	102	$61,690
23	40	01	Mike Wallace	MB2 Motorsports	Pontiac	199	0	running	94	$59,765
24	36	43	Christian Fittipaldi	Petty Enterprises	Dodge	199	0	running	91	$83,893
25	16	30	Steve Park	Richard Childress Racing	Chevrolet	198	0	running	88	$56,240
26	34	49	Ken Schrader	BAM Racing	Dodge	198	0	running	85	$47,590
27	24	16	Greg Biffle	Roush Racing	Ford	197	0	running	82	$47,340
28	12	42	Jamie McMurray	Chip Ganassi Racing	Dodge	195	0	running	79	$47,190
29	43	50	Larry Foyt	A. J. Foyt Enterprises	Dodge	188	0	running	76	$44,015
30	4	18	Bobby Labonte	Joe Gibbs Racing	Chevrolet	180	0	engine	73	$89,448
31	39	1	Jeff Green	Dale Earnhardt, Inc.	Chevrolet	180	0	running	70	$71,402
32	28	23	Kenny Wallace	Bill Davis Racing	Dodge	178	0	running	67	$51,954
33	5	0	John Andretti	Haas CNC Racing	Pontiac	176	0	running	64	$44,265
34	35	45	Kyle Petty	Petty Enterprises	Dodge	170	0	running	61	$51,165
35	10	41	Casey Mears	Chip Ganassi Racing	Dodge	164	8	crash	63	$50,990
36	25	24	Jeff Gordon	Hendrick Motorsports	Chevrolet	155	0	crash	55	$90,168
37	33	20	Tony Stewart	Joe Gibbs Racing	Chevrolet	153	14	engine	57	$105,203
38	15	19	Jeremy Mayfield	Evernham Motorsports	Dodge	123	0	crash	49	$50,500
39	27	21	Ricky Rudd	Wood Brothers Racing	Ford	121	0	engine	46	$50,385
40	32	32	Ricky Craven	PPI Motorsports	Pontiac	115	0	engine	43	$50,230
41	14	6	Mark Martin	Roush Racing	Ford	74	0	crash	40	$75,923
42	41	37	Derrike Cope	Quest Motor Racing	Chevrolet	66	0	fuel pump	37	$42,000
43	42	89	Morgan Shepherd	Shepherd Racing Ventures	Ford	44	0	handling	34	$42,186
Official race results

Previous race: 2003 New England 300	NASCAR Winston Cup Series; 2003 season	Next race: 2003 Brickyard 400
