= 2003 MBNA Armed Forces Family 400 =

13th race of the 2003 NASCAR Winston Cup Series

Race details
- Race 13 of 36 in the 2003 NASCAR Winston Cup Series
- The 2003 MBNA Armed Forces Family 400 program cover.
- Date: June 1, 2003
- Official name: 35th Annual MBNA Armed Forces Family 400
- Location: Dover, Delaware, Dover International Speedway
- Course: Permanent racing facility
- Course length: 1 miles (1.6 km)
- Distance: 400 laps, 400 mi (643.737 km)
- Average speed: 109.514 miles per hour (176.246 km/h)

Pole position
Driver	Ryan Newman	Penske Racing South
- Time: 22.682

Most laps led
Driver	Ryan Newman	Penske Racing South
- Laps: 162

Winner
No. 12	Ryan Newman	Penske Racing South

Television in the United States
- Network: FOX
- Announcers: Mike Joy, Larry McReynolds, Darrell Waltrip

Radio in the United States
- Radio: Motor Racing Network

The 2003 MBNA Armed Forces Family 400 was the 13th stock car race of the 2003 NASCAR Winston Cup Series season and the 35th iteration of the event. The race was held on Sunday, June 1, 2003, in Dover, Delaware at Dover International Speedway, a 1-mile (1.6 km) permanent oval-shaped racetrack. The race took the scheduled 400 laps to complete. At race's end, Penske Racing South driver Ryan Newman would manage to dominate the late stages of the race to take his third career NASCAR Winston Cup Series victory and his second victory of the season. To fill out the top 3, Hendrick Motorsports driver Jeff Gordon and Joe Gibbs Racing driver Bobby Labonte would finish second and third, respectively.

== Background ==
The layout of Dover International Speedway, the venue where the race was held.

Dover International Speedway is an oval race track in Dover, Delaware, that opened in 1969. The track features one layout, a 1-mile (1.6 km) concrete oval, with 24° banking in the turns and 9° banking on the straights. The speedway is owned and operated by Speedway Motorsports.

The track, nicknamed "The Monster Mile", was built in 1969 by Melvin Joseph of Melvin L. Joseph Construction Company, Inc., with an asphalt surface, but was replaced with concrete in 1995. Six years later in 2001, the track's capacity moved to 135,000 seats, making the track have the largest capacity of sports venue in the mid-Atlantic. In 2002, the name changed to Dover International Speedway from Dover Downs International Speedway after Dover Downs Gaming and Entertainment split, making Dover Motorsports. From 2007 to 2009, the speedway worked on an improvement project called "The Monster Makeover", which expanded facilities at the track and beautified the track. After the 2014 season, the track's capacity was reduced to 95,500 seats.

=== Entry list ===
- (R) denotes rookie driver.

#	Driver	Team	Make
0	Jack Sprague (R)	Haas CNC Racing	Pontiac
1	Jeff Green	Dale Earnhardt, Inc.	Chevrolet
01	Mike Wallace	MB2 Motorsports	Pontiac
2	Rusty Wallace	Penske Racing South	Dodge
4	Mike Skinner	Morgan–McClure Motorsports	Pontiac
5	Terry Labonte	Hendrick Motorsports	Chevrolet
6	Mark Martin	Roush Racing	Ford
7	Jimmy Spencer	Ultra Motorsports	Dodge
8	Dale Earnhardt Jr.	Dale Earnhardt, Inc.	Chevrolet
9	Bill Elliott	Evernham Motorsports	Dodge
10	Johnny Benson Jr.	MB2 Motorsports	Pontiac
11	Brett Bodine	Brett Bodine Racing	Ford
12	Ryan Newman	Penske Racing South	Dodge
14	Larry Foyt	A. J. Foyt Enterprises	Dodge
15	Michael Waltrip	Dale Earnhardt, Inc.	Chevrolet
16	Greg Biffle (R)	Roush Racing	Ford
17	Matt Kenseth	Roush Racing	Ford
18	Bobby Labonte	Joe Gibbs Racing	Chevrolet
19	Jeremy Mayfield	Evernham Motorsports	Dodge
20	Tony Stewart	Joe Gibbs Racing	Chevrolet
21	Ricky Rudd	Wood Brothers Racing	Ford
22	Ward Burton	Bill Davis Racing	Dodge
23	Kenny Wallace	Bill Davis Racing	Dodge
24	Jeff Gordon	Hendrick Motorsports	Chevrolet
25	Joe Nemechek	Hendrick Motorsports	Chevrolet
29	Kevin Harvick	Richard Childress Racing	Chevrolet
30	Steve Park	Richard Childress Racing	Chevrolet
31	Robby Gordon	Richard Childress Racing	Chevrolet
32	Ricky Craven	PPI Motorsports	Pontiac
37	Derrike Cope	Quest Motor Racing	Chevrolet
38	Elliott Sadler	Robert Yates Racing	Ford
40	Sterling Marlin	Chip Ganassi Racing	Dodge
41	Casey Mears (R)	Chip Ganassi Racing	Dodge
42	Jamie McMurray (R)	Chip Ganassi Racing	Dodge
43	Jeff Green	Petty Enterprises	Dodge
45	Kyle Petty	Petty Enterprises	Dodge
48	Jimmie Johnson	Hendrick Motorsports	Chevrolet
49	Ken Schrader	BAM Racing	Dodge
54	Todd Bodine	BelCar Motorsports	Ford
74	Tony Raines	BACE Motorsports	Chevrolet
77	Dave Blaney	Jasper Motorsports	Ford
88	Dale Jarrett	Robert Yates Racing	Ford
97	Kurt Busch	Roush Racing	Ford
99	Jeff Burton	Roush Racing	Ford

== Practice ==
Originally, three practice sessions were scheduled to be held, with one practice on Friday, May 30, and two on Saturday, May 31. However, due to rain, the final Saturday session was cancelled.

=== First practice ===
The first practice session was held on Friday, May 30, at 11:05 AM EST. The session would last for one hour and 55 minutes. Ryan Newman, driving for Penske Racing South, would set the fastest time in the session, with a lap of 22.738 and an average speed of 158.325 miles per hour (254.799 km/h).

Pos.	#	Driver	Team	Make	Time	Speed
1	12	Ryan Newman	Penske Racing South	Dodge	22.738	158.325
2	17	Matt Kenseth	Roush Racing	Ford	22.836	157.646
3	8	Dale Earnhardt Jr.	Dale Earnhardt, Inc.	Chevrolet	22.838	157.632
Full first practice results

=== Final practice ===
The final practice session was held on Saturday, May 31, at 9:30 AM EST. The session would last for 45 minutes. Sterling Marlin, driving for Chip Ganassi Racing, would set the fastest time in the session, with a lap of 23.263 and an average speed of 154.752 miles per hour (249.049 km/h).

Pos.	#	Driver	Team	Make	Time	Speed
1	40	Sterling Marlin	Chip Ganassi Racing	Dodge	23.263	154.752
2	20	Tony Stewart	Joe Gibbs Racing	Chevrolet	23.299	154.513
3	97	Kurt Busch	Roush Racing	Ford	23.428	153.662
Full Happy Hour practice results

== Qualifying ==
Qualifying was held on Friday, May 30, at 2:35 PM EST. Each driver would have two laps to set a fastest time; the fastest of the two would count as their official qualifying lap. Positions 1-36 would be decided on time, while positions 37-43 would be based on provisionals. Six spots are awarded by the use of provisionals based on owner's points. The seventh is awarded to a past champion who has not otherwise qualified for the race. If no past champ needs the provisional, the next team in the owner points will be awarded a provisional.

Ryan Newman, driving for Penske Racing South, would win the pole, setting a time of 22.682 and an average speed of 158.716 miles per hour (255.429 km/h).

Derrike Cope was the only driver to fail to qualify.

=== Full qualifying results ===
Pos.	#	Driver	Team	Make	Time	Speed
1	12	Ryan Newman	Penske Racing South	Dodge	22.682	158.716
2	2	Rusty Wallace	Penske Racing South	Dodge	22.883	157.322
3	19	Jeremy Mayfield	Evernham Motorsports	Dodge	22.901	157.198
4	17	Matt Kenseth	Roush Racing	Ford	22.929	157.006
5	48	Jimmie Johnson	Hendrick Motorsports	Chevrolet	22.981	156.651
6	40	Sterling Marlin	Chip Ganassi Racing	Dodge	22.982	156.644
7	97	Kurt Busch	Roush Racing	Ford	22.984	156.631
8	5	Terry Labonte	Hendrick Motorsports	Chevrolet	22.991	156.583
9	24	Jeff Gordon	Hendrick Motorsports	Chevrolet	23.064	156.087
10	30	Steve Park	Richard Childress Racing	Chevrolet	23.072	156.033
11	20	Tony Stewart	Joe Gibbs Racing	Chevrolet	23.073	156.027
12	8	Dale Earnhardt Jr.	Dale Earnhardt, Inc.	Chevrolet	23.095	155.878
13	18	Bobby Labonte	Joe Gibbs Racing	Chevrolet	23.098	155.858
14	9	Bill Elliott	Evernham Motorsports	Dodge	23.098	155.858
15	16	Greg Biffle (R)	Roush Racing	Ford	23.104	155.817
16	15	Michael Waltrip	Dale Earnhardt, Inc.	Chevrolet	23.128	155.656
17	38	Elliott Sadler	Robert Yates Racing	Ford	23.139	155.581
18	01	Mike Wallace	MB2 Motorsports	Pontiac	23.166	155.400
19	42	Jamie McMurray (R)	Chip Ganassi Racing	Dodge	23.185	155.273
20	32	Ricky Craven	PPI Motorsports	Pontiac	23.212	155.092
21	54	Todd Bodine	BelCar Motorsports	Ford	23.224	155.012
22	41	Casey Mears (R)	Chip Ganassi Racing	Dodge	23.226	154.999
23	29	Kevin Harvick	Richard Childress Racing	Chevrolet	23.228	154.985
24	21	Ricky Rudd	Wood Brothers Racing	Ford	23.237	154.925
25	49	Ken Schrader	BAM Racing	Dodge	23.240	154.905
26	77	Dave Blaney	Jasper Motorsports	Ford	23.243	154.885
27	45	Kyle Petty	Petty Enterprises	Dodge	23.263	154.752
28	99	Jeff Burton	Roush Racing	Ford	23.277	154.659
29	88	Dale Jarrett	Robert Yates Racing	Ford	23.295	154.540
30	10	Johnny Benson Jr.	MBV Motorsports	Pontiac	23.308	154.453
31	7	Jimmy Spencer	Ultra Motorsports	Dodge	23.316	154.400
32	6	Mark Martin	Roush Racing	Ford	23.323	154.354
33	1	Jeff Green	Dale Earnhardt, Inc.	Chevrolet	23.339	154.248
34	11	Brett Bodine	Brett Bodine Racing	Ford	23.393	153.892
35	4	Mike Skinner	Morgan–McClure Motorsports	Pontiac	23.415	153.748
36	23	Kenny Wallace	Bill Davis Racing	Dodge	23.423	153.695
Provisionals
37	25	Joe Nemechek	Hendrick Motorsports	Chevrolet	23.442	153.570
38	31	Robby Gordon	Richard Childress Racing	Chevrolet	23.446	153.544
39	22	Ward Burton	Bill Davis Racing	Dodge	23.645	152.252
40	43	John Andretti	Petty Enterprises	Dodge	23.468	153.400
41	0	Jack Sprague (R)	Haas CNC Racing	Pontiac	23.640	152.284
42	74	Tony Raines (R)	BACE Motorsports	Chevrolet	23.668	152.104
43	14	Larry Foyt	A. J. Foyt Enterprises	Dodge	23.632	152.336
Failed to qualify
44	37	Derrike Cope	Quest Motor Racing	Chevrolet	23.813	151.178
Official qualifying results

== Race results ==
Fin	St	#	Driver	Team	Make	Laps	Led	Status	Pts	Winnings
1	1	12	Ryan Newman	Penske Racing South	Dodge	400	162	running	185	$199,325
2	9	24	Jeff Gordon	Hendrick Motorsports	Chevrolet	400	53	running	175	$176,228
3	13	18	Bobby Labonte	Joe Gibbs Racing	Chevrolet	400	34	running	170	$139,333
4	11	20	Tony Stewart	Joe Gibbs Racing	Chevrolet	400	67	running	165	$145,253
5	30	10	Johnny Benson Jr.	MBV Motorsports	Pontiac	400	0	running	155	$110,975
6	2	2	Rusty Wallace	Penske Racing South	Dodge	400	41	running	155	$110,097
7	4	17	Matt Kenseth	Roush Racing	Ford	400	0	running	146	$87,985
8	20	32	Ricky Craven	PPI Motorsports	Pontiac	400	0	running	142	$95,565
9	38	31	Robby Gordon	Richard Childress Racing	Chevrolet	400	3	running	143	$99,747
10	8	5	Terry Labonte	Hendrick Motorsports	Chevrolet	400	0	running	134	$97,641
11	12	8	Dale Earnhardt Jr.	Dale Earnhardt, Inc.	Chevrolet	400	2	running	135	$106,692
12	21	54	Todd Bodine	BelCar Motorsports	Ford	400	0	running	127	$83,110
13	19	42	Jamie McMurray (R)	Chip Ganassi Racing	Dodge	400	0	running	124	$68,970
14	28	99	Jeff Burton	Roush Racing	Ford	399	0	running	121	$98,652
15	7	97	Kurt Busch	Roush Racing	Ford	399	1	running	123	$95,685
16	16	15	Michael Waltrip	Dale Earnhardt, Inc.	Chevrolet	399	1	running	120	$78,935
17	24	21	Ricky Rudd	Wood Brothers Racing	Ford	399	0	running	112	$82,950
18	32	6	Mark Martin	Roush Racing	Ford	399	0	running	109	$97,968
19	18	01	Mike Wallace	MB2 Motorsports	Pontiac	398	0	running	106	$72,199
20	26	77	Dave Blaney	Jasper Motorsports	Ford	398	0	running	103	$73,335
21	3	19	Jeremy Mayfield	Evernham Motorsports	Dodge	398	0	running	100	$71,885
22	14	9	Bill Elliott	Evernham Motorsports	Dodge	398	0	running	97	$98,668
23	36	23	Kenny Wallace	Bill Davis Racing	Dodge	398	0	running	94	$63,785
24	37	25	Joe Nemechek	Hendrick Motorsports	Chevrolet	397	0	running	91	$62,630
25	33	1	Jeff Green	Dale Earnhardt, Inc.	Chevrolet	396	0	running	88	$84,942
26	25	49	Ken Schrader	BAM Racing	Dodge	396	0	running	85	$62,205
27	23	29	Kevin Harvick	Richard Childress Racing	Chevrolet	395	0	running	82	$97,833
28	43	14	Larry Foyt	A. J. Foyt Enterprises	Dodge	394	0	running	79	$58,880
29	31	7	Jimmy Spencer	Ultra Motorsports	Dodge	393	0	running	76	$61,230
30	15	16	Greg Biffle (R)	Roush Racing	Ford	387	0	crash	73	$59,090
31	42	74	Tony Raines (R)	BACE Motorsports	Chevrolet	382	0	running	70	$58,430
32	10	30	Steve Park	Richard Childress Racing	Chevrolet	367	0	running	67	$66,270
33	17	38	Elliott Sadler	Robert Yates Racing	Ford	331	0	running	64	$93,270
34	40	43	John Andretti	Petty Enterprises	Dodge	309	0	running	61	$93,688
35	6	40	Sterling Marlin	Chip Ganassi Racing	Dodge	301	0	crash	58	$101,695
36	35	4	Mike Skinner	Morgan–McClure Motorsports	Pontiac	298	0	running	55	$57,580
37	39	22	Ward Burton	Bill Davis Racing	Dodge	279	0	engine	52	$93,526
38	5	48	Jimmie Johnson	Hendrick Motorsports	Chevrolet	277	36	crash	54	$76,760
39	29	88	Dale Jarrett	Robert Yates Racing	Ford	255	0	engine	46	$103,028
40	22	41	Casey Mears (R)	Chip Ganassi Racing	Dodge	244	0	crash	43	$65,120
41	41	0	Jack Sprague (R)	Haas CNC Racing	Pontiac	215	0	crash	40	$56,995
42	34	11	Brett Bodine	Brett Bodine Racing	Ford	213	0	crash	37	$56,890
43	27	45	Kyle Petty	Petty Enterprises	Dodge	207	0	crash	34	$65,028
Official race results

Previous race: 2003 Coca-Cola 600	NASCAR Winston Cup Series; 2003 season	Next race: 2003 Pocono 500
