= Todd Berrier =

NASCAR crew chief

Todd Berrier (born May 29, 1970) is an American former crew chief for Furniture Row Racing in the NASCAR Sprint Cup Series. Previously, he was a crew chief at Richard Childress Racing, most notably with Kevin Harvick. He joined RCR in 1997 as crew chief in the Camping World Truck Series for Jay Sauter. Berrier and Sauter stayed together for three years, winning four times. In 2000, Berrier first worked with Harvick in the Nationwide Series, where they won three races and Harvick was named Rookie of the Year. They won the championship together the following season. They then separated for a few seasons as Harvick drove the No. 29 in Cup while Berrier worked as the crew chief for another RCR team, before coming back together in mid-2003.

Berrier eventually added a win at the 2007 Daytona 500 to his resume. Berrier's cousin, Ed, is a former winner in the Nationwide Series and has since joined his cousin in the crew chief ranks by serving as the crew chief for Alex Yontz Racing in the Camping World Truck Series. Berrier also served as crew chief for Hermie Sadler's "Speed 1" NASCAR Sprint Cup demonstration vehicle on NASCAR RaceDay.

In 2016, Berrier replaced Adam Stevens as the crew chief for Joe Gibbs Racing driver Kyle Busch for the NASCAR Sprint Cup Series Race at Dover following Stevens' suspension by NASCAR after the team was hit with a P3 penalty following Busch's win at Kansas.
