= Kerry Earnhardt =

American stock car racing driver (born 1969)

Kerry Dale Earnhardt
- Born: December 8, 1969 (age 56); Kannapolis, North Carolina, U.S.

NASCAR Cup Series career
- 7 races run over 3 years
- Best finish: 61st (2004, 2005)
- First race: 2000 Pepsi 400 presented by Meijer (Michigan)
- Last race: 2005 UAW-Ford 500 (Talladega)
Wins	Top tens	Poles
0	0	0

NASCAR O'Reilly Auto Parts Series career
- 72 races run over 10 years
- Best finish: 22nd (2002)
- First race: 1998 Myrtle Beach 250 (Myrtle Beach)
- Last race: 2009 Subway Jalapeno 250 (Daytona)
Wins	Top tens	Poles
0	6	0

NASCAR FedEx Freight Truck Series career
- 27 races run over 2 years
- Best finish: 22nd (2006)
- First race: 2005 Florida Dodge Dealers 250 (Daytona)
- Last race: 2006 Ford 200 (Homestead)
Wins	Top tens	Poles
0	0	1

ARCA Menards Series career
- 11 races run over 2 years
- Best finish: 30th (2000)
- First race: 2000 Pro2Call ARCA 200 (Daytona)
- Last race: 2001 Pork, The Other White Meat 400 (Atlanta)
- First win: 2000 Pocono ARCA 200 (Pocono)
- Last win: 2001 Pork, The Other White Meat 400 (Atlanta)
Wins	Top tens	Poles
4	8	0
- Statistics up to date as of June 7, 2012.

Kerry Dale Earnhardt (born December 8, 1969) is an American former NASCAR driver and the eldest son of seven-time NASCAR Cup Series champion Dale Earnhardt. He is the half-brother of former NASCAR Cup Series driver Dale Earnhardt Jr. and Kelley Earnhardt Miller. He was employed by Dale Earnhardt, Inc. as a consultant specializing in driver development until 2011. His younger son, Jeffrey Earnhardt, began racing for DEI in 2007 and currently competes in the NASCAR Xfinity Series. Kerry Earnhardt is known for his physical similarity to his father.

== Early life ==
Earnhardt's mother, Latane Brown (1951-2021), was Dale Earnhardt's first wife. Dale Earnhardt was eighteen years old and a local North Carolina dirt racer at the time of Kerry's birth. The couple divorced when Kerry was one year old. Brown eventually married Jack Key, who adopted Kerry; Kerry used his stepfather's surname for much of his life. Until he was sixteen, he saw little of his biological father.

Prior to his racing career, Earnhardt dropped out of high school and worked several odd jobs to support his family. This included working at a Pizza Hut and in the Cannon Mills in Kannapolis, North Carolina, where his grandfather, Ralph Earnhardt, also worked.

== Racing career ==
Earnhardt began racing in 1992 driving street stocks. That same season, he raced in the NASCAR Goody's Dash Series. He raced at various tracks in 1993, including the East Carolina Motor Speedway near Robersonville, North Carolina and Langley Speedway in Hampton, Virginia. He scored two top-fives and eight top-tens in 11 races and was the 1992 Rookie of the Year.

Earnhardt won a pole position and recorded eight top-fives and forty top-tens as well as 1994 Rookie of the Year honors at his local track, Hickory Motor Speedway, in the NASCAR Dodge Weekly Racing Series. His first NASCAR start came in the Busch Series at Myrtle Beach in 1998. After select Busch races in 1998 and 1999, he raced in the Automobile Racing Club of America's ARCA Racing Series in 2000 and 2001 for Dale Earnhardt, Inc. (DEI) using DEI NASCAR Cup Series (known as the Winston Cup Series to 2003) equipment formerly used by Steve Park. During this stint, he won four of his eleven starts, with seven top-fives and eight top-tens.

In 2000, Earnhardt made his Winston Cup debut at Michigan driving for Marcis Auto Racing, racing against both his father and his half-brother, Dale Earnhardt Jr. He wrecked out of the race on lap five. It was the first of his seven Winston Cup starts. In 2001, the same year his father was killed at Daytona, Earnhardt was involved in a massive crash on October 4 in an ARCA race at Charlotte Motor Speedway. On lap 63 of 67, Earnhardt had to dodge a lapped car by hitting his brakes, which caused Blaise Alexander's No. 75 car to catch up to Earnhardt. Alexander began to inch into the lead when Earnhardt's car made contact with Alexander's, sending Alexander's car head-on into the wall and back into Earnhardt's car, causing Earnhardt to flip over onto his roof and slide into the grass. Earnhardt managed to climb out by himself. Alexander was given a red flag and the race director called it official, which gave Earnhardt the victory. Alexander was pronounced dead in the infield care center at 10:20 p.m.

In late November 2001, it was announced that Earnhardt would run the full 2002 Busch Series for FitzBradshaw Racing, owned by Armando Fitz and Terry Bradshaw. The entry was sponsored by Supercuts and 10-10-220, with a technical alliance with DEI. The car was initially numbered 8, but later numbered 12. He finished 22nd in points, scoring three top-fives and six top-tens, including a 2nd place finish at Kansas, which would be his best in that series. This was one of his two full seasons in any of NASCAR's top three series (Cup, Busch, and Truck). He also attempted to make several Winston Cup races in 2002 and 2003 in the No. 83 Aaron's, Inc./Hot Tamales Chevrolet for FitzBradshaw, but failed to qualify for every race he attempted. Midway through the 2003 season, Earnhardt was released by FitzBradshaw, replaced by Tim Fedewa.

In 2004 and 2005, Earnhardt raced in six Cup Series races for Richard Childress Racing in the No. 33 car. All six starts were restrictor plate races (Daytona and Talladega). His highest finish was a 17th-place run at Talladega in the 2005 Aaron's 499. Also in 2004, Earnhardt made eight starts in the K&N Pro Series West for Bill McAnally Racing, scoring two top-fives and five top-tens.

In 2005, Earnhardt joined Billy Ballew Motorsports in the Craftsman Truck Series, replacing Shane Hmiel. Earnhardt won the pole position for the season opening Florida Dodge Dealers 250, but he lost his ride after two races due to lack of sponsorship, with Hmiel returning. For the 2006 season, he signed with ThorSport Racing and drove the No. 13 Chevrolet the full season with occasional sponsorship from the National Pork Board. The season was a struggle, and his best finish that year was an 11th place at Nashville and Las Vegas. At the conclusion of the season, he and ThorSport Racing went their separate ways.

In December 2007, Earnhardt announced his retirement as a competitive driver in a letter to fans on his website.

Earnhardt was still an active test driver for DEI and occasionally drove in the Nationwide Series (NNS). His last appearance in a national touring series was the NNS' Subway Jalapeño 250 on July 3, 2009, at Daytona International Speedway driving the No. 31 car for Rick Ware Racing. In 2016, he drove one of his father's original race cars, a No. 3 1995 Chevrolet Monte Carlo, at the Goodwood Festival of Speed in England.

== Family life ==
Earnhardt and wife, René, married in 1999. They have a daughter, Kayla. From their previous marriages, Kerry has two sons, Bobby and Jeffrey, and René has a daughter, Blade. In 2017, Bobby Earnhardt raced part-time in the ARCA Racing Series, driving the No. 3 Chevrolet for Hixson Motorsports and the No. 96 Ford for Brian Kaltreider Racing. He made his NASCAR debut in the Xfinity Series driving the No. 40 Chevy Camaro for MBM Motorsports at Richmond in 2017. As of 2022, Jeffrey Earnhardt races in the NASCAR Xfinity Series for Sam Hunt Racing and Richard Childress Racing, and has previously raced in the NASCAR Cup Series. Bobby and Jeffrey are the fourth generation of Earnhardts in professional motorsports.

=== Legal issues ===
In May 2016, Earnhardt's stepmother, Teresa Earnhardt, sued him for using the Earnhardt name when he and his wife were planning to market a line of homes and furniture under the name The Earnhardt Collection. On July 27, 2017, Teresa Earnhardt won an appeal which required the U.S. Trademark Trial and Appeal Board to clarify its decision to allow him to use the name Earnhardt Collection in his business. Kerry ultimately won the case and the right to use the Earnhardt name in his business venture as surnames cannot be trademarked.

== Motorsports career results ==
=== NASCAR ===
(key) (Bold – Pole position awarded by qualifying time. Italics – Pole position earned by points standings or practice time. * – Most laps led.)

==== Nextel Cup Series ====
NASCAR Nextel Cup Series results
Year	Team	No.	Make	1	2	3	4	5	6	7	8	9	10	11	12	13	14	15	16	17	18	19	20	21	22	23	24	25	26	27	28	29	30	31	32	33	34	35	36	NNCC	Pts	Ref
2000	Marcis Auto Racing	71	Chevy	DAY	CAR	LVS	ATL	DAR	BRI	TEX	MAR	TAL	CAL	RCH	CLT	DOV	MCH	POC	SON	DAY	NHA	POC	IND	GLN	MCH; 43	BRI	DAR	RCH	NHA	DOV	MAR	CLT	TAL	CAR	PHO	HOM	ATL			72nd	34	
2002	FitzBradshaw Racing	83	Chevy	DAY	CAR	LVS	ATL	DAR	BRI	TEX	MAR	TAL	CAL	RCH	CLT	DOV	POC	MCH	SON	DAY	CHI	NHA	POC	IND	GLN	MCH	BRI	DAR	RCH	NHA	DOV	KAN	TAL; DNQ	CLT; DNQ	MAR	ATL; DNQ	CAR	PHO	HOM	NA	–	
2003	FitzBradshaw Racing	83	Chevy	DAY	CAR	LVS	ATL	DAR	BRI	TEX; DNQ	TAL	MAR	CAL; DNQ	RCH	CLT	DOV	POC	MCH	SON	DAY; DNQ	CHI	NHA	POC	IND	GLN	MCH	BRI	DAR	RCH	NHA	DOV	TAL	KAN	CLT	MAR	ATL	PHO	CAR	HOM	NA	–	
2004	Richard Childress Racing	33	Chevy	DAY	CAR	LVS	ATL	DAR	BRI	TEX	MAR	TAL; 35	CAL	RCH	CLT	DOV	POC	MCH; DNQ	SON	DAY; 28	CHI	NHA	POC	IND	GLN	MCH; DNQ	BRI	CAL	RCH	NHA	DOV	TAL; 24	KAN	CLT	MAR	ATL; DNQ	PHO	DAR	HOM	61st	228	
2005	Richard Childress Racing	33	Chevy	DAY; DNQ	CAL	LVS	ATL	BRI	MAR	TEX	PHO	TAL; 17	DAR	RCH	CLT	DOV	POC	MCH	SON	DAY; 42	CHI	NHA	POC	IND	GLN	MCH	BRI	CAL	RCH	NHA	DOV	TAL; 39	KAN	CLT	MAR	ATL	TEX	PHO	HOM	61st	195	

===== Daytona 500 =====
Year	Team	Manufacturer	Start	Finish
2005	Richard Childress Racing	Chevrolet	DNQ	

==== Nationwide Series ====
NASCAR Nationwide Series results
Year	Team	No.	Make	1	2	3	4	5	6	7	8	9	10	11	12	13	14	15	16	17	18	19	20	21	22	23	24	25	26	27	28	29	30	31	32	33	34	35	NNSC	Pts	Ref
1998	Specialty Racing	40	Chevy	DAY	CAR	LVS	NSV	DAR	BRI	TEX	HCY	TAL	NHA	NZH	CLT	DOV	RCH	PPR	GLN	MLW	MYB; 23	CAL	SBO; 26	IRP	MCH	BRI	DAR	RCH	DOV		GTY; 39	CAR	ATL	HOM					72nd	225	
1998	Specialty Racing	04	Chevy																											CLT; DNQ									72nd	225	
1999	Galaxy Motorsports	40	Chevy	DAY; 20	CAR; 43	LVS; 36	ATL; 33	DAR; DNQ	TEX	NSV	BRI	TAL	CAL	NHA	RCH	NZH	CLT	DOV	SBO	GLN	MLW	MYB	PPR	GTY	IRP	MCH													81st	256	
1999	Whitaker Racing	76	Chevy																								BRI; DNQ												81st	256	
1999	Whitaker Racing	7	Chevy																									DAR; DNQ	RCH	DOV	CLT	CAR	MEM	PHO	HOM				81st	256	
2001	Michael Waltrip Racing	99	Chevy	DAY	CAR	LVS	ATL	DAR	BRI	TEX	NSH	TAL	CAL	RCH	NHA	NZH	CLT	DOV	KEN; 20	MLW	GLN	CHI	GTY	PPR; 24	IRP	MCH; 26	BRI	DAR	RCH	DOV	KAN	CLT	MEM	PHO	CAR	HOM			73rd	279	
2002	FitzBradshaw Racing	12	Chevy	DAY; 41	CAR; 28	LVS; 19	DAR; 18	BRI; 28	TEX; 23	NSH; 8	TAL; 18	CAL; 21	RCH; 33	NHA; 18	NZH; 20	CLT; 28	DOV; 16	NSH; 18	KEN; 7	MLW; 27	DAY; 38	CHI; 43	GTY; 12	PPR; 18	IRP; 35	MCH; 21	BRI; 31	DAR; 28	RCH; 27	DOV; 39	KAN; 2	CLT; 31	MEM; 5	ATL; 41	CAR; 31	PHO; 10	HOM; 27		22nd	3145	
2003	FitzBradshaw Racing	12	Chevy	DAY; 14	CAR; 15	LVS; 14	DAR; 33	BRI; 34	TEX; 31	TAL; 17	NSH; 26	CAL; 40	RCH; 19	GTY; 17	NZH; 14	CLT; 35	DOV; 14	NSH; 30	KEN; 34	MLW; 15	DAY; 33	CHI; 41	NHA	PPR	IRP	MCH	BRI	DAR	RCH	DOV	KAN	CLT	MEM	ATL					27th	1767	
2003	Innovative Motorsports	48	Chevy																																PHO; 25				27th	1767	
2003	BACE Motorsports	74	Chevy																																	CAR; 23	HOM		27th	1767	
2004	Richard Childress Racing	29	Chevy	DAY	CAR	LVS	DAR	BRI	TEX	NSH	TAL	CAL	GTY	RCH	NZH	CLT	DOV	NSH	KEN	MLW	DAY	CHI	NHA	PPR	IRP	MCH	BRI	CAL	RCH	DOV; 23	KAN	CLT	MEM	ATL	PHO	DAR	HOM		120th	94	
2005	Michael Waltrip Racing	98	Chevy	DAY	CAL	MXC	LVS	ATL	NSH	BRI	TEX	PHO	TAL; 5	DAR	RCH	CLT	DOV	NSH	KEN	MLW																			94th	189	
2005	Michael Waltrip Racing	99	Chevy																		DAY; 43														MEM; DNQ	TEX	PHO	HOM	94th	189	
2005	Red Cactus Racing	73	Chevy																			CHI; DNQ	NHA	PPR	GTY	IRP	GLN; DNQ	MCH	BRI	CAL	RCH	DOV	KAN	CLT					94th	189	
2007	Jeff Spraker Racing	63	Chevy	DAY	CAL	MXC	LVS	ATL	BRI	NSH	TEX	PHO	TAL	RCH	DAR	CLT	DOV	NSH	KEN	MLW	NHA	DAY; 25	CHI	GTY	IRP	CGV	GLN	MCH	BRI	CAL	RCH	DOV	KAN	CLT	MEM	TEX	PHO	HOM	134th	88	
2008	Dale Earnhardt, Inc.	8	Chevy	DAY	CAL	LVS	ATL	BRI	NSH	TEX	PHO	MXC	TAL	RCH	DAR	CLT	DOV	NSH	KEN	MLW	NHA	DAY; 17	CHI	GTY	IRP	CGV	GLN	MCH	BRI	CAL	RCH	DOV	KAN	CLT	MEM	TEX	PHO	HOM	150th	0	
2009	Rick Ware Racing	31	Chevy	DAY	CAL	LVS	BRI	TEX; DNQ	NSH	PHO	TAL; 12	RCH	DAR	CLT	DOV	NSH	KEN	MLW	NHA	DAY; 38	CHI	GTY	IRP	IOW	GLN	MCH	BRI	CGV	ATL	RCH	DOV	KAN	CAL	CLT	MEM	TEX	PHO	HOM	101st	176	

==== Craftsman Truck Series ====
NASCAR Craftsman Truck Series results
Year	Team	No.	Make	1	2	3	4	5	6	7	8	9	10	11	12	13	14	15	16	17	18	19	20	21	22	23	24	25	NCTC	Pts	Ref
2005	Billy Ballew Motorsports	15	Chevy	**DAY**; 35	CAL; 17	ATL	MAR	GTY	MFD	CLT	DOV	TEX	MCH	MLW	KAN	KEN	MEM	IRP	NSH	BRI	RCH	NHA	LVS	MAR	ATL	TEX	PHO	HOM	67th	175	
2006	ThorSport Racing	13	Chevy	DAY; 18	CAL; 29	ATL; 34	MAR; 20	GTY; 27	CLT; 20	MFD; 27	DOV; 29	TEX; 34	MCH; 29	MLW; 35	KAN; 25	KEN; 23	MEM; 28	IRP; 23	NSH; 11	BRI; 20	NHA; 19	LVS; 11	TAL; 36	MAR; 33	ATL; 21	TEX; 29	PHO; 27	HOM; 19	22nd	2199	

==== Goody's Dash Series ====
NASCAR Goody's Dash Series results
Year	Team	No.	Make	1	2	3	4	5	6	7	8	9	10	11	12	13	14	15	16	NGDS	Pts	Ref
1993	Dale Earnhardt Inc.	3	Chevy	DAY; 7	NSV; 12	SUM; 19	VOL; 8	MAR; 16	LON; 7	411	LAN	HCY; 8	SUM	FLO	BGS	MYB; 7	NRV; 6	HCY; 6	VOL; 6	11th	1520	

=== ARCA Re/Max Series ===
(key) (Bold – Pole position awarded by qualifying time. Italics – Pole position earned by points standings or practice time. * – Most laps led.)

ARCA Re/Max Series results
Year	Team	No.	Make	1	2	3	4	5	6	7	8	9	10	11	12	13	14	15	16	17	18	19	20	21	22	23	24	25	ARMC	Pts	Ref
2000	Dale Earnhardt, Inc.	2	Chevy	DAY; 39	SLM	AND	CLT; 2	KIL	FRS	MCH; 3	POC; 1*	TOL	KEN	BLN	POC; 2	WIN	ISF	KEN	DSF	SLM	CLT	TAL	ATL; 6						30th	1150	
2001	Dale Earnhardt, Inc.	2	Chevy	DAY; 14	NSH	WIN	SLM	GTY	KEN	CLT; 20	KAN	MCH; 1*	POC	MEM	GLN	KEN	MCH	POC	NSH	ISF	CHI	DSF	SLM	TOL	BLN	CLT; 1*	TAL	ATL; 1*	35th	1005	
2007	Jeff Spraker Racing	37	Chevy	DAY	USA	NSH	SLM	KAN	WIN	KEN	TOL	IOW	POC	MCH	BLN	KEN	POC	NSH	ISF	MIL	GTW	DSF	CHI	SLM	TAL; DNQ	TOL			185th	25	
