= 2003 Sirius Satellite Radio at The Glen =

22nd race of the 2003 NASCAR Winston Cup Series

Race details
- Race 22 of 36 in the 2003 NASCAR Winston Cup Series
- The 2003 Sirius Satellite Radio at The Glen program cover.
- Date: August 10, 2003
- Official name: 18th Annual Sirius Satellite Radio at The Glen
- Location: Watkins Glen, New York, Watkins Glen International
- Course: Permanent racing facility
- Course length: 2.454 miles (3.949 km)
- Distance: 90 laps, 220.5 mi (354.86 km)
- Scheduled distance: 90 laps, 220.5 mi (354.86 km)
- Average speed: 90.441 miles per hour (145.551 km/h)
- Attendance: 100,000

Pole position
Driver	Jeff Gordon	Hendrick Motorsports
- Time: 1:10.798

Most laps led
Driver	Robby Gordon	Richard Childress Racing
- Laps: 30

Winner
No. 31	Robby Gordon	Richard Childress Racing

Television in the United States
- Network: NBC
- Announcers: Allen Bestwick, Benny Parsons, Wally Dallenbach Jr.

Radio in the United States
- Radio: Motor Racing Network

The 2003 Sirius Satellite Radio at The Glen was the 22nd stock car race of the 2003 NASCAR Winston Cup Series season and the 18th iteration of the event. The race was held on Sunday, August 10, 2003, before a crowd of 100,000 at the shortened layout of Watkins Glen International, a 2.454 miles (3.949 km) permanent road course. The race took the scheduled 90 laps to complete. At race's end, Robby Gordon of Richard Childress Racing would stretch out a fuel run in the last 39 laps of the race to win his third and final career NASCAR Winston Cup Series win and his second and final win of the season. To fill out the podium, Scott Pruett of Chip Ganassi Racing and Dale Earnhardt Jr. of Dale Earnhardt Jr. would finish second and third, respectively.

== Background ==
The layout of Watkins Glen International NASCAR uses.

Watkins Glen International (nicknamed "The Glen") is an automobile race track located in Watkins Glen, New York at the southern tip of Seneca Lake. It was long known around the world as the home of the Formula One United States Grand Prix, which it hosted for twenty consecutive years (1961–1980), but the site has been home to road racing of nearly every class, including the World Sportscar Championship, Trans-Am, Can-Am, NASCAR Sprint Cup Series, the International Motor Sports Association and the IndyCar Series.

Initially, public roads in the village were used for the race course. In 1956 a permanent circuit for the race was built. In 1968 the race was extended to six hours, becoming the 6 Hours of Watkins Glen. The circuit's current layout has more or less been the same since 1971, although a chicane was installed at the uphill Esses in 1975 to slow cars through these corners, where there was a fatality during practice at the 1973 United States Grand Prix. The chicane was removed in 1985, but another chicane called the "Inner Loop" was installed in 1992 after J.D. McDuffie's fatal accident during the previous year's NASCAR Winston Cup event.

The circuit is known as the Mecca of North American road racing and is a very popular venue among fans and drivers. The facility is currently owned by International Speedway Corporation.

=== Entry list ===
No.	Driver	Team	Make
0	John Andretti	Haas CNC Racing	Pontiac
1	Ron Fellows	Dale Earnhardt, Inc.	Chevrolet
01	Boris Said	MB2 Motorsports	Pontiac
2	Rusty Wallace	Penske Racing South	Dodge
4	P. J. Jones	Morgan–McClure Motorsports	Pontiac
04	Johnny Miller	Morgan–McClure Motorsports	Pontiac
5	Terry Labonte	Hendrick Motorsports	Chevrolet
6	Mark Martin	Roush Racing	Ford
7	Jimmy Spencer	Ultra Motorsports	Dodge
8	Dale Earnhardt Jr.	Dale Earnhardt, Inc.	Chevrolet
9	Bill Elliott	Evernham Motorsports	Dodge
10	Johnny Benson Jr.	MB2 Motorsports	Pontiac
12	Ryan Newman	Penske Racing South	Dodge
15	Michael Waltrip	Dale Earnhardt, Inc.	Chevrolet
16	Greg Biffle	Roush Racing	Ford
17	Matt Kenseth	Roush Racing	Ford
18	Bobby Labonte	Joe Gibbs Racing	Chevrolet
19	Jeremy Mayfield	Evernham Motorsports	Dodge
20	Tony Stewart	Joe Gibbs Racing	Chevrolet
21	Ricky Rudd	Wood Brothers Racing	Ford
22	Ward Burton	Bill Davis Racing	Dodge
23	Kenny Wallace	Bill Davis Racing	Dodge
24	Jeff Gordon	Hendrick Motorsports	Chevrolet
25	Joe Nemechek	Hendrick Motorsports	Chevrolet
29	Kevin Harvick	Richard Childress Racing	Chevrolet
30	Steve Park	Richard Childress Racing	Chevrolet
31	Robby Gordon	Richard Childress Racing	Chevrolet
32	Ricky Craven	PPI Motorsports	Pontiac
33	Paul Menard	Andy Petree Racing	Chevrolet
35	Joe Varde	Joe Varde Racing	Chevrolet
38	Elliott Sadler	Robert Yates Racing	Ford
39	Scott Pruett	Chip Ganassi Racing	Dodge
40	Sterling Marlin	Chip Ganassi Racing	Dodge
41	Casey Mears	Chip Ganassi Racing	Dodge
42	Jamie McMurray	Chip Ganassi Racing	Dodge
43	Scott Maxwell	Petty Enterprises	Dodge
44	Christian Fittipaldi	Petty Enterprises	Dodge
45	Kyle Petty	Petty Enterprises	Dodge
48	Jimmie Johnson	Hendrick Motorsports	Chevrolet
49	Ken Schrader	BAM Racing	Dodge
50	Larry Foyt	A. J. Foyt Enterprises	Dodge
54	Todd Bodine	BelCar Motorsports	Ford
74	Tony Raines	BACE Motorsports	Chevrolet
77	Dave Blaney	Jasper Motorsports	Ford
88	Dale Jarrett	Robert Yates Racing	Ford
97	Kurt Busch	Roush Racing	Ford
99	Jeff Burton	Roush Racing	Ford
Official entry list

== Practice ==
=== First practice ===
The first practice session was held on Friday, August 8, at 11:00 AM EST, and would last for 2 hours. Dale Earnhardt Jr. of Dale Earnhardt, Inc. would set the fastest time in the session, with a lap of 1:10.981 and an average speed of 124.259 miles per hour (199.975 km/h).

Pos.	No.	Driver	Team	Make	Time	Speed
1	8	Dale Earnhardt Jr.	Dale Earnhardt, Inc.	Chevrolet	1:10.981	124.259
2	24	Jeff Gordon	Hendrick Motorsports	Chevrolet	1:10.984	124.253
3	16	Greg Biffle	Roush Racing	Ford	1:11.110	124.033
Full first practice results

=== Second practice ===
The second practice session was held on Saturday, August 9, at 9:30 AM EST, and would last for 45 minutes. Tony Stewart of Joe Gibbs Racing would set the fastest time in the session, with a lap of 1:12.050 and an average speed of 122.415 miles per hour (197.008 km/h).

Pos.	No.	Driver	Team	Make	Time	Speed
1	20	Tony Stewart	Joe Gibbs Racing	Chevrolet	1:12.050	122.415
2	6	Mark Martin	Roush Racing	Ford	1:12.099	122.332
3	1	Ron Fellows	Dale Earnhardt, Inc.	Chevrolet	1:12.362	121.887
Full second practice results

=== Third and final practice ===
The third and final practice session, sometimes referred to as Happy Hour, was held on Saturday, August 9, at 11:10 AM EST, and would last for 45 minutes. Greg Biffle of Roush Racing would set the fastest time in the session, with a lap of 1:12.050 and an average speed of 122.415 miles per hour (197.008 km/h).

Pos.	No.	Driver	Team	Make	Time	Speed
1	16	Greg Biffle	Roush Racing	Ford	1:11.433	123.472
2	6	Mark Martin	Roush Racing	Ford	1:12.031	122.447
3	8	Dale Earnhardt Jr.	Dale Earnhardt, Inc.	Chevrolet	1:12.249	122.078
Full Happy Hour practice results

== Qualifying ==
Qualifying was held on Friday, August 8, at 3:05 PM EST. Drivers would each have one lap to set a lap time. Positions 1-36 would be decided on time, while positions 37-43 would be based on provisionals. Six spots are awarded by the use of provisionals based on owner's points. The seventh is awarded to a past champion who has not otherwise qualified for the race. If no past champ needs the provisional, the next team in the owner points will be awarded a provisional.

Jeff Gordon of Hendrick Motorsports would win the pole, setting a time of 1:10.798 and an average speed of 124.580 miles per hour (200.492 km/h).

Four drivers would fail to qualify: Ken Schrader, Joe Varde, Scott Maxwell, and Larry Foyt.

=== Full qualifying results ===
Pos.	No.	Driver	Team	Make	Time	Speed
1	24	Jeff Gordon	Hendrick Motorsports	Chevrolet	1:10.798	124.580
2	16	Greg Biffle	Roush Racing	Ford	1:10.845	124.497
3	6	Mark Martin	Roush Racing	Ford	1:10.864	124.464
4	20	Tony Stewart	Joe Gibbs Racing	Chevrolet	1:10.976	124.267
5	2	Rusty Wallace	Penske Racing South	Dodge	1:10.983	124.255
6	8	Dale Earnhardt Jr.	Dale Earnhardt, Inc.	Chevrolet	1:11.046	124.145
7	17	Matt Kenseth	Roush Racing	Ford	1:11.317	123.673
8	97	Kurt Busch	Roush Racing	Ford	1:11.317	123.673
9	18	Bobby Labonte	Joe Gibbs Racing	Chevrolet	1:11.365	123.590
10	01	Boris Said	MB2 Motorsports	Pontiac	1:11.484	123.384
11	29	Kevin Harvick	Richard Childress Racing	Chevrolet	1:11.572	123.232
12	41	Casey Mears	Chip Ganassi Racing	Dodge	1:11.597	123.189
13	12	Ryan Newman	Penske Racing South	Dodge	1:11.622	123.146
14	31	Robby Gordon	Richard Childress Racing	Chevrolet	1:11.696	123.019
15	0	John Andretti	Haas CNC Racing	Pontiac	1:11.731	122.959
16	77	Dave Blaney	Jasper Motorsports	Ford	1:11.751	122.925
17	54	Todd Bodine	BelCar Racing	Ford	1:!1.865	122.730
18	1	Ron Fellows	Dale Earnhardt, Inc.	Chevrolet	1:11.883	122.699
19	5	Terry Labonte	Hendrick Motorsports	Chevrolet	1:11.898	122.674
20	48	Jimmie Johnson	Hendrick Motorsports	Chevrolet	1:11.910	122.653
21	25	Joe Nemechek	Hendrick Motorsports	Chevrolet	1:11.927	122.624
22	22	Ward Burton	Bill Davis Racing	Dodge	1:12.013	122.478
23	99	Jeff Burton	Roush Racing	Ford	1:12.018	122.469
24	38	Elliott Sadler	Robert Yates Racing	Ford	1:12.091	122.345
25	9	Bill Elliott	Evernham Motorsports	Dodge	1:12.112	122.310
26	21	Ricky Rudd	Wood Brothers Racing	Ford	1:12.139	122.264
27	10	Johnny Benson Jr.	MB2 Motorsports	Pontiac	1:12.158	122.232
28	39	Scott Pruett	Chip Ganassi Racing	Dodge	1:12.210	122.144
29	42	Jamie McMurray	Chip Ganassi Racing	Dodge	1:12.298	121.995
30	88	Dale Jarrett	Robert Yates Racing	Ford	1:12.497	121.660
31	45	Kyle Petty	Petty Enterprises	Dodge	1:12.633	121.432
32	04	Johnny Miller	Morgan–McClure Motorsports	Pontiac	1:12.655	121.396
33	4	P. J. Jones	Morgan–McClure Motorsports	Pontiac	1:12.728	121.274
34	15	Michael Waltrip	Dale Earnhardt, Inc.	Chevrolet	1:12.752	121.234
35	23	Kenny Wallace	Bill Davis Racing	Dodge	1:12.775	121.196
36	44	Christian Fittipaldi	Petty Enterprises	Dodge	1:12.791	121.169
Provisionals
37	40	Sterling Marlin	Chip Ganassi Racing	Dodge	1:13.248	120.413
38	32	Ricky Craven	PPI Motorsports	Pontiac	1:14.028	119.144
39	7	Jimmy Spencer	Ultra Motorsports	Dodge	1:14.344	118.638
40	19	Jeremy Mayfield	Evernham Motorsports	Dodge	1:13.281	120.359
41	30	Steve Park	Richard Childress Racing	Chevrolet	1:13.367	120.217
42	74	Tony Raines	BACE Motorsports	Chevrolet	1:12.875	121.029
43	33	Paul Menard	Andy Petree Racing	Chevrolet	1:13.172	120.538
Failed to qualify
44	49	Ken Schrader	BAM Racing	Dodge	1:13.525	119.959
45	35	Joe Varde	Joe Varde Racing	Chevrolet	1:13.561	119.900
46	43	Scott Maxwell	Petty Enterprises	Dodge	1:13.724	119.635
47	50	Larry Foyt	A. J. Foyt Enterprises	Dodge	1:14.865	117.812
Official qualifying results

== Race results ==
Fin	St	No.	Driver	Team	Make	Laps	Led	Status	Pts	Winnings
1	14	31	Robby Gordon	Richard Childress Racing	Chevrolet	90	30	running	185	$156,272
2	28	39	Scott Pruett	Chip Ganassi Racing	Dodge	90	9	running	175	$88,210
3	6	8	Dale Earnhardt Jr.	Dale Earnhardt, Inc.	Chevrolet	90	11	running	170	$127,202
4	20	48	Jimmie Johnson	Hendrick Motorsports	Chevrolet	90	0	running	160	$86,850
5	11	29	Kevin Harvick	Richard Childress Racing	Chevrolet	90	0	running	155	$96,408
6	22	22	Ward Burton	Bill Davis Racing	Dodge	90	0	running	150	$94,046
7	30	88	Dale Jarrett	Robert Yates Racing	Ford	90	0	running	146	$98,688
8	7	17	Matt Kenseth	Roush Racing	Ford	90	0	running	142	$70,535
9	13	12	Ryan Newman	Penske Racing South	Dodge	90	0	running	138	$83,930
10	3	6	Mark Martin	Roush Racing	Ford	90	0	running	134	$90,598
11	4	20	Tony Stewart	Joe Gibbs Racing	Chevrolet	90	0	running	130	$101,233
12	8	97	Kurt Busch	Roush Racing	Ford	90	0	running	127	$85,100
13	34	15	Michael Waltrip	Dale Earnhardt, Inc.	Chevrolet	90	0	running	124	$65,800
14	9	18	Bobby Labonte	Joe Gibbs Racing	Chevrolet	90	5	running	126	$93,443
15	24	38	Elliott Sadler	Robert Yates Racing	Ford	90	0	running	118	$86,820
16	40	19	Jeremy Mayfield	Evernham Motorsports	Dodge	90	0	running	115	$59,600
17	21	25	Joe Nemechek	Hendrick Motorsports	Chevrolet	90	0	running	112	$50,830
18	19	5	Terry Labonte	Hendrick Motorsports	Chevrolet	90	0	running	109	$76,566
19	15	0	John Andretti	Haas CNC Racing	Pontiac	90	0	running	106	$50,055
20	25	9	Bill Elliott	Evernham Motorsports	Dodge	90	0	running	103	$86,693
21	26	21	Ricky Rudd	Wood Brothers Racing	Ford	90	1	running	105	$72,535
22	29	42	Jamie McMurray	Chip Ganassi Racing	Dodge	90	1	running	102	$50,715
23	39	7	Jimmy Spencer	Ultra Motorsports	Dodge	90	0	running	94	$62,795
24	33	4	P. J. Jones	Morgan–McClure Motorsports	Pontiac	90	0	running	91	$59,135
25	16	77	Dave Blaney	Jasper Motorsports	Ford	90	0	running	88	$65,189
26	41	30	Steve Park	Richard Childress Racing	Chevrolet	90	0	running	85	$56,140
27	27	10	Johnny Benson Jr.	MB2 Motorsports	Pontiac	90	0	running	82	$74,565
28	38	32	Ricky Craven	PPI Motorsports	Pontiac	90	0	running	79	$55,555
29	43	33	Paul Menard	Andy Petree Racing	Chevrolet	90	0	running	76	$52,410
30	2	16	Greg Biffle	Roush Racing	Ford	90	23	running	78	$47,825
31	23	99	Jeff Burton	Roush Racing	Ford	90	10	running	75	$80,157
32	12	41	Casey Mears	Chip Ganassi Racing	Dodge	90	0	running	67	$52,150
33	1	24	Jeff Gordon	Hendrick Motorsports	Chevrolet	89	0	crash	64	$97,353
34	35	23	Kenny Wallace	Bill Davis Racing	Dodge	89	0	running	61	$44,015
35	17	54	Todd Bodine	BelCar Racing	Ford	89	0	running	58	$43,950
36	32	04	Johnny Miller	Morgan–McClure Motorsports	Pontiac	89	0	running	55	$43,875
37	5	2	Rusty Wallace	Penske Racing South	Dodge	84	0	running	52	$78,492
38	18	1	Ron Fellows	Dale Earnhardt, Inc.	Chevrolet	82	0	handling	49	$68,927
39	10	01	Boris Said	MB2 Motorsports	Pontiac	80	0	running	46	$43,690
40	36	44	Christian Fittipaldi	Petty Enterprises	Dodge	80	0	running	43	$43,615
41	42	74	Tony Raines	BACE Motorsports	Chevrolet	78	0	running	40	$43,555
42	31	45	Kyle Petty	Petty Enterprises	Dodge	74	0	running	37	$51,485
43	37	40	Sterling Marlin	Chip Ganassi Racing	Dodge	1	0	engine	34	$86,809
Official race results

Previous race: 2003 Brickyard 400	NASCAR Winston Cup Series; 2003 season	Next race: 2003 GFS Marketplace 400
