= 2003 Dodge/Save Mart 350 =

16th race of the 2003 NASCAR Winston Cup Series

Race details
- Race 16 of 36 in the 2003 NASCAR Sprint Cup Series
- The 2003 Dodge/Save Mart 350 program cover.
- Date: June 22, 2003
- Official name: 15th Annual Dodge/Save Mart 350
- Location: Sonoma, California, Sonoma Raceway
- Course: Permanent racing facility
- Course length: 1.99 miles (3.20 km)
- Distance: 110 laps, 218.9 mi (352.285 km)
- Scheduled distance: 110 laps, 218.9 mi (352.285 km)
- Average speed: 73.821 miles per hour (118.803 km/h)
- Attendance: 100,000

Pole position
Driver	Boris Said	MB2 Motorsports
- Time: 1:16.522

Most laps led
Driver	Robby Gordon	Richard Childress Racing
- Laps: 81

Winner
No. 31	Robby Gordon	Richard Childress Racing

Television in the United States
- Network: FOX
- Announcers: Mike Joy, Larry McReynolds, Darrell Waltrip

Radio in the United States
- Radio: Performance Racing Network

The 2003 Dodge/Save Mart 350 was the 16th stock car race of the 2003 NASCAR Winston Cup Series season and the 15th iteration of the event. The race was held on Sunday, June 22, 2003, in Sonoma, California, at the club layout in Sonoma Raceway, a 1.99 miles (3.20 km) permanent road course layout. The race took the scheduled 110 laps to complete. At race's end, Robby Gordon of Richard Childress Racing would win under caution, but not before making a controversial pass racing back to the line against eventual third-place finisher, teammate Kevin Harvick on lap 71 that sealed Gordon's victory. The win was Gordon's second career NASCAR Winston Cup Series win and his first of the season. To fill out the podium, Jeff Gordon of Hendrick Motorsports would finish second.

That was first race when Nextel became the new title sponsor starting in next season.

== Background ==
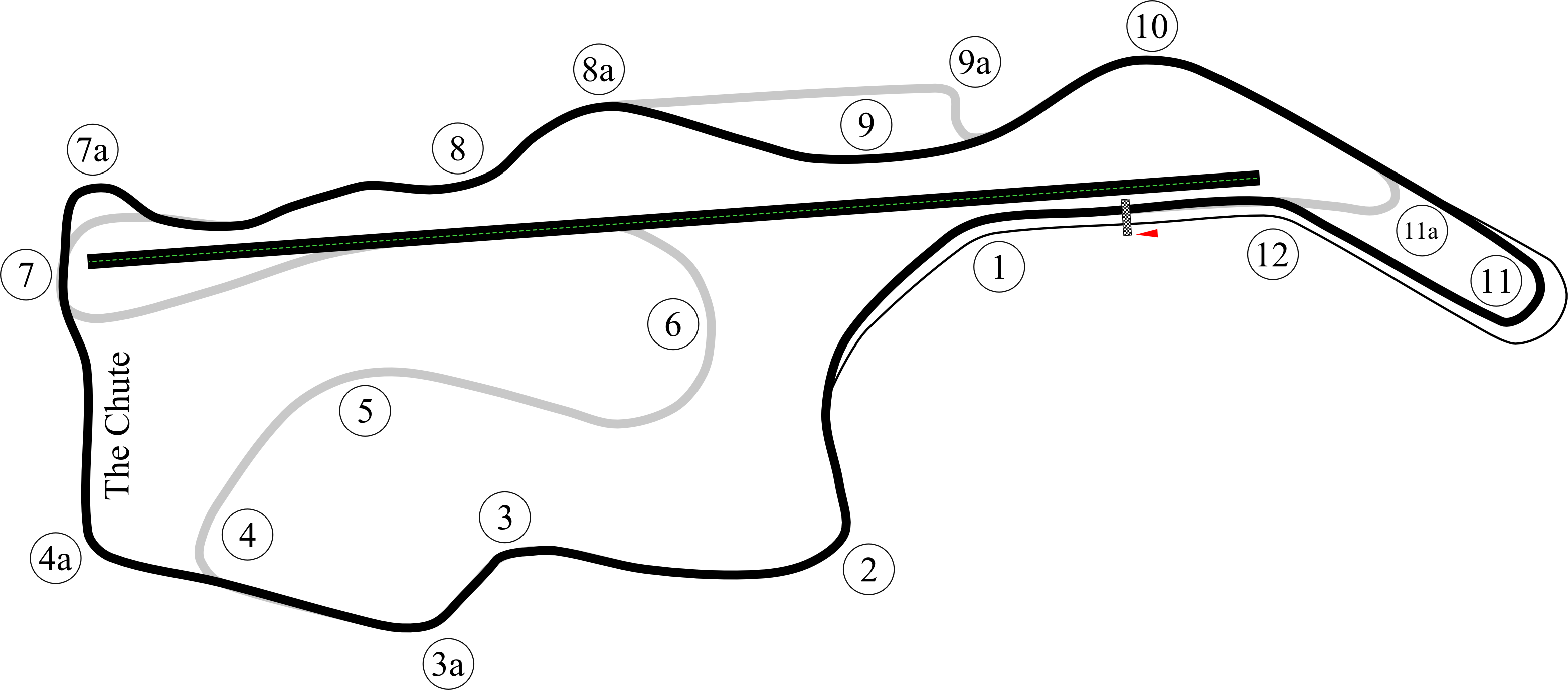
The layout of Sonoma Raceway used by NASCAR at the time.

Sonoma Raceway is one of two road courses to hold NASCAR races, the other being Watkins Glen International. The standard road course at Infineon Raceway is a 12-turn course that is 2.52 miles (4.06 km) long; the track was modified in 1998, adding the Chute, which bypassed turns 5 and 6, shortening the course to 1.95 miles (3.14 km). The Chute was only used for NASCAR events such as this race, and was criticized by many drivers, who preferred the full layout. In 2001, it was replaced with a 70-degree turn, 4A, bringing the track to its current dimensions of 1.99 miles (3.20 km).

=== Entry list ===
#	Driver	Team	Make
0	Jack Sprague	Haas CNC Racing	Pontiac
00	Jim Inglebright	Bill McAnally Racing	Chevrolet
1	Ron Fellows	Dale Earnhardt, Inc.	Chevrolet
01	Boris Said	MB2 Motorsports	Pontiac
2	Rusty Wallace	Penske Racing	Dodge
02	Brandon Ash	Ash Motorsports	Ford
4	Johnny Miller	Morgan–McClure Motorsports	Pontiac
5	Terry Labonte	Hendrick Motorsports	Chevrolet
6	Mark Martin	Roush Racing	Ford
7	Jimmy Spencer	Ultra Motorsports	Dodge
8	Dale Earnhardt Jr.	Dale Earnhardt, Inc.	Chevrolet
9	Bill Elliott	Evernham Motorsports	Dodge
09	Scott Pruett	Chip Ganassi Racing	Dodge
10	Johnny Benson Jr.	MB2 Motorsports	Pontiac
12	Ryan Newman	Penske Racing	Dodge
14	P. J. Jones	A. J. Foyt Enterprises	Dodge
15	Michael Waltrip	Dale Earnhardt, Inc.	Chevrolet
16	Greg Biffle	Roush Racing	Ford
17	Matt Kenseth	Roush Racing	Ford
18	Bobby Labonte	Joe Gibbs Racing	Chevrolet
19	Jeremy Mayfield	Evernham Motorsports	Dodge
20	Tony Stewart	Joe Gibbs Racing	Chevrolet
21	Ricky Rudd	Wood Brothers Racing	Ford
22	Ward Burton	Bill Davis Racing	Dodge
23	Kenny Wallace	Bill Davis Racing	Dodge
24	Jeff Gordon	Hendrick Motorsports	Chevrolet
25	Joe Nemechek	Hendrick Motorsports	Chevrolet
29	Kevin Harvick	Richard Childress Racing	Chevrolet
30	Jeff Green	Richard Childress Racing	Chevrolet
31	Robby Gordon	Richard Childress Racing	Chevrolet
32	Ricky Craven	PPI Motorsports	Pontiac
33	Paul Menard	Andy Petree Racing	Chevrolet
38	Elliott Sadler	Robert Yates Racing	Ford
40	Sterling Marlin	Chip Ganassi Racing	Dodge
41	Casey Mears	Chip Ganassi Racing	Dodge
42	Jamie McMurray	Chip Ganassi Racing	Dodge
43	Christian Fittipaldi	Petty Enterprises	Dodge
45	Kyle Petty	Petty Enterprises	Dodge
48	Jimmie Johnson	Hendrick Motorsports	Chevrolet
49	Ken Schrader	BAM Racing	Dodge
54	Todd Bodine	BelCar Racing	Ford
66	Hideo Fukuyama	BelCar Racing	Ford
74	Tony Raines	BACE Motorsports	Chevrolet
77	Dave Blaney	Jasper Motorsports	Ford
88	Dale Jarrett	Robert Yates Racing	Ford
97	Kurt Busch	Roush Racing	Ford
99	Jeff Burton	Roush Racing	Ford
Official entry list

== Practice ==
=== First practice ===
The first practice would occur on Friday, June 20, at 11:20 AM PST, and would last for two hours. Boris Said of MB2 Motorsports would set the fastest time in the session, with a lap of 1:17.264 and an average speed of 92.721 miles per hour (149.220 km/h).

Pos.	#	Driver	Team	Make	Time	Speed
1	01	Boris Said	MB2 Motorsports	Pontiac	1:17.264	92.721
2	18	Bobby Labonte	Joe Gibbs Racing	Chevrolet	1:17.284	92.697
3	8	Dale Earnhardt Jr.	Dale Earnhardt, Inc.	Chevrolet	1:17.322	92.652
Full first practice results

=== Second practice ===
The second practice would occur on Saturday, June 21, at 9:30 AM PST and would last for 45 minutes. Kurt Busch of Roush Racing would set the fastest time in the session, with a lap of 1:17.622 and an average speed of 92.293 miles per hour (148.531 km/h).

Pos.	#	Driver	Team	Make	Time	Speed
1	97	Kurt Busch	Roush Racing	Ford	1:17.622	92.293
2	5	Terry Labonte	Hendrick Motorsports	Chevrolet	1:17.765	92.124
3	24	Jeff Gordon	Hendrick Motorsports	Chevrolet	1:17.788	92.096
Full second practice results

=== Third and final practice ===
The third and final practice session, sometimes referred to as Happy Hour, would occur on Saturday, June 21, at 11:10 AM PST and would last for 45 minutes. Boris Said of MB2 Motorsports would set the fastest time in the session, with a lap of 1:17.265 and an average speed of 92.720 miles per hour (149.218 km/h).

Pos.	#	Driver	Team	Make	Time	Speed
1	01	Boris Said	MB2 Motorsports	Pontiac	1:17.265	92.720
2	12	Ryan Newman	Penske Racing South	Dodge	1:17.331	92.641
3	31	Robby Gordon	Richard Childress Racing	Chevrolet	1:17.338	92.632
Full Happy Hour practice results

== Qualifying ==
Qualifying was held on Friday, June 20, at 3:05 PM PST. Drivers would each have one lap to set a lap time. Positions 1-36 would be decided on time, while positions 37-43 would be based on provisionals. Six spots are awarded by the use of provisionals based on owner's points. The seventh is awarded to a past champion who has not otherwise qualified for the race. If no past champ needs the provisional, the next team in the owner points will be awarded a provisional.

Boris Said of MB2 Motorsports would win the pole, setting a time of 1:16.522 and an average speed of 93.620 miles per hour (150.667 km/h).

Two incidents would occur during the session. First, Jimmie Johnson would spin in Turn 10, forcing him to use a provisional. Then, Ricky Craven would blow an engine, also forcing him to use a provisional.

Four drivers would fail to qualify: P. J. Jones, Paul Menard, Jim Inglebright, and Brandon Ash.

=== Full qualifying results ===
Pos.	#	Driver	Team	Make	Time	Speed
1	01	Boris Said	MB2 Motorsports	Pontiac	1:16.522	93.620
2	31	Robby Gordon	Richard Childress Racing	Chevrolet	1:16.816	93.262
3	1	Ron Fellows	Dale Earnhardt, Inc.	Chevrolet	1:16.972	93.073
4	17	Matt Kenseth	Roush Racing	Ford	1:17.133	92.879
5	97	Kurt Busch	Roush Racing	Ford	1:17.133	92.879
6	29	Kevin Harvick	Richard Childress Racing	Chevrolet	1:17.165	92.840
7	2	Rusty Wallace	Penske Racing South	Dodge	1:17.180	92.822
8	24	Jeff Gordon	Hendrick Motorsports	Chevrolet	1:17.198	92.800
9	21	Ricky Rudd	Wood Brothers Racing	Ford	1:17.255	92.732
10	20	Tony Stewart	Joe Gibbs Racing	Chevrolet	1:17.310	92.666
11	8	Dale Earnhardt Jr.	Dale Earnhardt, Inc.	Chevrolet	1:17.414	92.541
12	9	Bill Elliott	Evernham Motorsports	Dodge	1:17.488	92.453
13	12	Ryan Newman	Penske Racing South	Dodge	1:17.510	92.427
14	18	Bobby Labonte	Joe Gibbs Racing	Chevrolet	1:17.587	92.335
15	77	Dave Blaney	Jasper Motorsports	Ford	1:17.603	92.316
16	99	Jeff Burton	Roush Racing	Ford	1:17.622	92.293
17	6	Mark Martin	Roush Racing	Ford	1:17.701	92.200
18	09	Scott Pruett	Chip Ganassi Racing	Dodge	1:17.719	92.178
19	22	Ward Burton	Bill Davis Racing	Dodge	1:17.776	92.111
20	15	Michael Waltrip	Dale Earnhardt, Inc.	Chevrolet	1:17.808	92.073
21	25	Joe Nemechek	Hendrick Motorsports	Chevrolet	1:17.851	92.022
22	54	Todd Bodine	BelCar Motorsports	Ford	1:17.884	91.983
23	5	Terry Labonte	Hendrick Motorsports	Chevrolet	1:17.945	91.911
24	38	Elliott Sadler	Robert Yates Racing	Ford	1:18.015	91.828
25	10	Johnny Benson Jr.	MB2 Motorsports	Pontiac	1:18.036	91.804
26	42	Jamie McMurray	Chip Ganassi Racing	Dodge	1:18.142	91.679
27	40	Sterling Marlin	Chip Ganassi Racing	Dodge	1:18.147	91.673
28	0	Jack Sprague	Haas CNC Racing	Pontiac	1:18.233	91.573
29	88	Dale Jarrett	Robert Yates Racing	Ford	1:18.286	91.511
30	23	Kenny Wallace	Bill Davis Racing	Dodge	1:18.305	91.488
31	19	Jeremy Mayfield	Evernham Motorsports	Dodge	1:18.333	91.456
32	16	Greg Biffle	Roush Racing	Ford	1:18.334	91.454
33	41	Casey Mears	Chip Ganassi Racing	Dodge	1:18.391	91.388
34	74	Tony Raines	BACE Motorsports	Chevrolet	1:18.439	91.332
35	45	Kyle Petty	Petty Enterprises	Dodge	1:18.621	91.121
36	4	Johnny Miller	Morgan–McClure Motorsports	Pontiac	1:18.679	91.053
Provisionals
37	48	Jimmie Johnson	Hendrick Motorsports	Chevrolet	1:36.655	74.119
38	32	Ricky Craven	PPI Motorsports	Pontiac	—	—
39	7	Jimmy Spencer	Ultra Motorsports	Dodge	1:18.892	90.808
40	30	Steve Park	Richard Childress Racing	Chevrolet	1:19.698	89.889
41	43	Christian Fittipaldi	Petty Enterprises	Dodge	1:18.688	91.043
42	49	Ken Schrader	BAM Racing	Dodge	1:20.589	88.896
43	66	Hideo Fukuyama	BelCar Racing	Ford	1:20.284	89.233
Failed to qualify
44	14	P. J. Jones	A. J. Foyt Enterprises	Dodge	1:18.926	90.769
45	33	Paul Menard	Andy Petree Racing	Chevrolet	1:19.656	89.937
46	00	Jim Inglebright	Bill McAnally Racing	Chevrolet	1:20.451	89.048
47	02	Brandon Ash	Ash Motorsports	Ford	1:19.205	90.449
Official qualifying results

== Race results ==
Fin	St	#	Driver	Team	Make	Laps	Led	Status	Pts	Winnings
1	2	31	Robby Gordon	Richard Childress Racing	Chevrolet	110	81	running	185	$204,512
2	8	24	Jeff Gordon	Hendrick Motorsports	Chevrolet	110	0	running	170	$143,203
3	6	29	Kevin Harvick	Richard Childress Racing	Chevrolet	110	0	running	165	$119,128
4	12	9	Bill Elliott	Evernham Motorsports	Dodge	110	0	running	160	$119,748
5	13	12	Ryan Newman	Penske Racing South	Dodge	110	0	running	155	$101,140
6	1	01	Boris Said	MB2 Motorsports	Pontiac	110	1	running	155	$90,990
7	3	1	Ron Fellows	Dale Earnhardt, Inc.	Chevrolet	110	21	running	151	$92,927
8	7	2	Rusty Wallace	Penske Racing South	Dodge	110	0	running	142	$99,482
9	14	18	Bobby Labonte	Joe Gibbs Racing	Chevrolet	110	0	running	138	$105,223
10	31	19	Jeremy Mayfield	Evernham Motorsports	Dodge	110	0	running	134	$80,335
11	11	8	Dale Earnhardt Jr.	Dale Earnhardt, Inc.	Chevrolet	110	0	running	130	$100,292
12	10	20	Tony Stewart	Joe Gibbs Racing	Chevrolet	110	0	running	127	$110,988
13	20	15	Michael Waltrip	Dale Earnhardt, Inc.	Chevrolet	110	0	running	124	$75,950
14	4	17	Matt Kenseth	Roush Racing	Ford	110	0	running	121	$78,975
15	9	21	Ricky Rudd	Wood Brothers Racing	Ford	110	0	running	118	$84,825
16	19	22	Ward Burton	Bill Davis Racing	Dodge	110	0	running	115	$93,406
17	37	48	Jimmie Johnson	Hendrick Motorsports	Chevrolet	110	0	running	112	$75,630
18	27	40	Sterling Marlin	Chip Ganassi Racing	Dodge	110	0	running	109	$99,775
19	17	6	Mark Martin	Roush Racing	Ford	110	0	running	106	$93,208
20	26	42	Jamie McMurray	Chip Ganassi Racing	Dodge	110	0	running	103	$62,525
21	38	32	Ricky Craven	PPI Motorsports	Pontiac	110	0	running	100	$80,050
22	24	38	Elliott Sadler	Robert Yates Racing	Ford	110	0	running	97	$93,125
23	22	54	Todd Bodine	BelCar Motorsports	Ford	110	0	running	94	$70,125
24	36	4	Johnny Miller	Morgan–McClure Motorsports	Pontiac	110	0	running	91	$66,939
25	23	5	Terry Labonte	Hendrick Motorsports	Chevrolet	110	0	running	88	$84,886
26	33	41	Casey Mears	Chip Ganassi Racing	Dodge	110	0	running	85	$66,300
27	35	45	Kyle Petty	Petty Enterprises	Dodge	110	0	running	82	$66,160
28	5	97	Kurt Busch	Roush Racing	Ford	110	0	running	79	$75,255
29	30	23	Kenny Wallace	Bill Davis Racing	Dodge	110	0	running	76	$58,035
30	25	10	Johnny Benson Jr.	MB2 Motorsports	Pontiac	109	7	running	78	$84,745
31	34	74	Tony Raines	BACE Motorsports	Chevrolet	109	0	running	70	$54,925
32	15	77	Dave Blaney	Jasper Motorsports	Ford	109	0	running	67	$62,865
33	42	49	Ken Schrader	BAM Racing	Dodge	109	0	running	64	$55,745
34	18	09	Scott Pruett	Chip Ganassi Racing	Dodge	109	0	running	61	$54,825
35	21	25	Joe Nemechek	Hendrick Motorsports	Chevrolet	109	0	running	58	$54,805
36	39	7	Jimmy Spencer	Ultra Motorsports	Dodge	109	0	running	55	$54,785
37	32	16	Greg Biffle	Roush Racing	Ford	106	0	out of gas	52	$54,765
38	16	99	Jeff Burton	Roush Racing	Ford	102	0	running	49	$88,162
39	28	0	Jack Sprague	Haas CNC Racing	Pontiac	95	0	running	46	$54,720
40	41	43	Christian Fittipaldi	Petty Enterprises	Dodge	86	0	transmission	43	$90,463
41	40	30	Steve Park	Richard Childress Racing	Chevrolet	85	0	crash	40	$62,650
42	29	88	Dale Jarrett	Robert Yates Racing	Ford	83	0	transmission	37	$100,403
43	43	66	Hideo Fukuyama	BelCar Racing	Ford	68	0	rear end	34	$54,829
Official race results

Previous race: 2003 Sirius 400	NASCAR Nextel Cup Series; 2003 season	Next race: 2003 Pepsi 400
