= 2003 Sirius 400 =

15th race of the 2003 NASCAR Winston Cup Series

Race details
- Race 15 of 36 in the 2003 NASCAR Winston Cup Series
- The 2003 Sirius 400 program cover.
- Date: June 15, 2003
- Official name: 35th Annual Sirius 400
- Location: Brooklyn, Michigan, Michigan International Speedway
- Course: Permanent racing facility
- Course length: 2 miles (3.2 km)
- Distance: 200 laps, 400 mi (643.737 km)
- Scheduled distance: 200 laps, 400 mi (643.737 km)
- Average speed: 131.219 miles per hour (211.177 km/h)
- Attendance: 160,000

Pole position
Driver	Bobby Labonte	Joe Gibbs Racing
- Time: 37.822

Most laps led
Driver	Sterling Marlin	Chip Ganassi Racing
- Laps: 102

Winner
No. 97	Kurt Busch	Roush Racing

Television in the United States
- Network: FOX
- Announcers: Mike Joy, Larry McReynolds, Darrell Waltrip

Radio in the United States
- Radio: Motor Racing Network

The 2003 Sirius 400 was the 15th stock car race of the 2003 NASCAR Winston Cup Series season and the 35th iteration of the event. The race was held on Sunday, June 15, 2003, before a crowd of 160,000 in Brooklyn, Michigan, at Michigan International Speedway, a two-mile (3.2 km) moderate-banked D-shaped speedway. The race took the scheduled 200 laps to complete. At race's end, Kurt Busch of Roush Racing would make adjustments at the end of the race to pass Hendrick Motorsports driver Jeff Gordon on lap 177, and hold off Bobby Labonte of Joe Gibbs Racing to win his seventh career NASCAR Winston Cup Series win and his third of the season. Labonte and Gordon would fill out the podium, finishing second and third, respectively.

== Background ==
The layout of Michigan International Speedway, the venue where the race was held.

The race was held at Michigan International Speedway, a two-mile (3.2 km) moderate-banked D-shaped speedway located in Brooklyn, Michigan. The track is used primarily for NASCAR events. It is known as a "sister track" to Texas World Speedway as MIS's oval design was a direct basis of TWS, with moderate modifications to the banking in the corners, and was used as the basis of Auto Club Speedway. The track is owned by International Speedway Corporation. Michigan International Speedway is recognized as one of motorsports' premier facilities because of its wide racing surface and high banking (by open-wheel standards; the 18-degree banking is modest by stock car standards).

=== Entry list ===
#	Driver	Team	Make
0	Jack Sprague	Haas CNC Racing	Pontiac
1	Jeff Green	Dale Earnhardt, Inc.	Chevrolet
01	Mike Wallace	MB2 Motorsports	Pontiac
2	Rusty Wallace	Penske Racing	Dodge
02	Hermie Sadler	SCORE Motorsports	Chevrolet
4	Mike Skinner	Morgan–McClure Motorsports	Pontiac
5	Terry Labonte	Hendrick Motorsports	Chevrolet
6	Mark Martin	Roush Racing	Ford
7	Jimmy Spencer	Ultra Motorsports	Dodge
8	Dale Earnhardt Jr.	Dale Earnhardt, Inc.	Chevrolet
9	Bill Elliott	Evernham Motorsports	Dodge
10	Johnny Benson Jr.	MB2 Motorsports	Pontiac
11	Brett Bodine*	Brett Bodine Racing	Ford
12	Ryan Newman	Penske Racing	Dodge
14	Larry Foyt	A. J. Foyt Enterprises	Dodge
15	Michael Waltrip	Dale Earnhardt, Inc.	Chevrolet
16	Greg Biffle	Roush Racing	Ford
17	Matt Kenseth	Roush Racing	Ford
18	Bobby Labonte	Joe Gibbs Racing	Chevrolet
19	Jeremy Mayfield	Evernham Motorsports	Dodge
20	Tony Stewart	Joe Gibbs Racing	Chevrolet
21	Ricky Rudd	Wood Brothers Racing	Ford
22	Ward Burton	Bill Davis Racing	Dodge
23	Kenny Wallace	Bill Davis Racing	Dodge
24	Jeff Gordon	Hendrick Motorsports	Chevrolet
25	Joe Nemechek	Hendrick Motorsports	Chevrolet
29	Kevin Harvick	Richard Childress Racing	Chevrolet
30	Steve Park	Richard Childress Racing	Chevrolet
31	Robby Gordon	Richard Childress Racing	Chevrolet
32	Ricky Craven	PPI Motorsports	Pontiac
37	Derrike Cope	Quest Motor Racing	Chevrolet
38	Elliott Sadler	Robert Yates Racing	Ford
40	Sterling Marlin	Chip Ganassi Racing	Dodge
41	Casey Mears	Chip Ganassi Racing	Dodge
42	Jamie McMurray	Chip Ganassi Racing	Dodge
43	Christian Fittipaldi	Petty Enterprises	Dodge
45	Kyle Petty	Petty Enterprises	Dodge
48	Jimmie Johnson	Hendrick Motorsports	Chevrolet
49	Ken Schrader	BAM Racing	Dodge
54	Todd Bodine	BelCar Motorsports	Ford
74	Tony Raines	BACE Motorsports	Chevrolet
77	Dave Blaney	Jasper Motorsports	Ford
88	Dale Jarrett	Robert Yates Racing	Ford
97	Kurt Busch	Roush Racing	Ford
99	Jeff Burton	Roush Racing	Ford
Official entry list

*Driver changed to Geoff Bodine for the race due to an injury Brett had suffered during the Happy Hour practice session.

== Practice ==
=== First practice ===
The first practice session was held on Friday, June 13, at 11:00 AM EST, and would last for 2 hours. Bobby Labonte of Joe Gibbs Racing would set the fastest time in the session, with a lap of 38.293 and an average speed of 188.024 miles per hour (302.595 km/h).

Pos.	#	Driver	Team	Make	Time	Speed
1	18	Bobby Labonte	Joe Gibbs Racing	Chevrolet	38.293	188.024
2	8	Dale Earnhardt Jr.	Dale Earnhardt, Inc.	Chevrolet	38.347	187.759
3	20	Tony Stewart	Joe Gibbs Racing	Chevrolet	38.409	187.456
Full first practice results

=== Second practice ===
The second practice session was held on Saturday, June 14, at 9:30 AM EST, and would last for 45 minutes. Tony Stewart of Joe Gibbs Racing would set the fastest time in the session, with a lap of 38.749 and an average speed of 185.811 miles per hour (299.034 km/h).

Pos.	#	Driver	Team	Make	Time	Speed
1	20	Tony Stewart	Joe Gibbs Racing	Chevrolet	38.749	185.811
2	12	Ryan Newman	Penske Racing	Dodge	39.056	184.351
3	97	Kurt Busch	Roush Racing	Ford	39.074	184.266
Full second practice results

=== Third and final practice ===
The third and final practice session, sometimes referred to as Happy Hour, was held on Saturday, June 14, at 11:10 AM EST, and would last for 45 minutes. Bobby Labonte of Joe Gibbs Racing would set the fastest time in the session, with a lap of 39.455 and an average speed of 182.486 miles per hour (293.683 km/h).

In the practice session, Brett Bodine would suffer a violent crash that would result in a broken right clavicle. As a result, brother Geoff Bodine would replace him for the race.

Pos.	#	Driver	Team	Make	Time	Speed
1	18	Bobby Labonte	Joe Gibbs Racing	Chevrolet	39.455	182.486
2	32	Ricky Craven	PPI Motorsports	Pontiac	39.626	181.699
3	19	Jeremy Mayfield	Evernham Motorsports	Dodge	39.760	181.087
Full Happy Hour practice results

== Qualifying ==
Qualifying was held on Friday, June 13, at 3:05 PM EST. Each driver would have two laps to set a fastest time; the fastest of the two would count as their official qualifying lap. Positions 1-36 would be decided on time, while positions 37-43 would be based on provisionals. Six spots are awarded by the use of provisionals based on owner's points. The seventh is awarded to a past champion who has not otherwise qualified for the race. If no past champ needs the provisional, the next team in the owner points will be awarded a provisional.

Bobby Labonte of Joe Gibbs Racing would win the pole, setting a time of 37.822 and an average speed of 190.365 miles per hour (306.363 km/h).

Jimmy Spencer would blow an engine in the session. He was forced to use a provisional.

Two drivers would fail to qualify: Mike Skinner and Larry Foyt.

=== Full qualifying results ===
Pos.	#	Driver	Team	Make	Time	Speed
1	18	Bobby Labonte	Joe Gibbs Racing	Chevrolet	37.822	190.365
2	20	Tony Stewart	Joe Gibbs Racing	Chevrolet	38.002	189.464
3	8	Dale Earnhardt Jr.	Dale Earnhardt, Inc.	Chevrolet	38.077	189.090
4	97	Kurt Busch	Roush Racing	Ford	38.139	188.783
5	5	Terry Labonte	Hendrick Motorsports	Chevrolet	38.158	188.689
6	24	Jeff Gordon	Hendrick Motorsports	Chevrolet	38.188	188.541
7	38	Elliott Sadler	Robert Yates Racing	Ford	38.197	188.497
8	12	Ryan Newman	Penske Racing	Dodge	38.238	188.294
9	15	Michael Waltrip	Dale Earnhardt, Inc.	Chevrolet	38.259	188.191
10	29	Kevin Harvick	Richard Childress Racing	Chevrolet	38.260	188.186
11	48	Jimmie Johnson	Hendrick Motorsports	Chevrolet	38.289	188.044
12	25	Joe Nemechek	Hendrick Motorsports	Chevrolet	38.289	188.044
13	1	Jeff Green	Dale Earnhardt, Inc.	Chevrolet	38.298	187.999
14	0	Jack Sprague	Haas CNC Racing	Pontiac	38.334	187.823
15	6	Mark Martin	Roush Racing	Ford	38.339	187.798
16	9	Bill Elliott	Evernham Motorsports	Dodge	38.340	187.793
17	2	Rusty Wallace	Penske Racing	Dodge	38.355	187.720
18	02	Hermie Sadler	SCORE Motorsports	Chevrolet	38.365	187.671
19	31	Robby Gordon	Richard Childress Racing	Chevrolet	38.367	187.661
20	19	Jeremy Mayfield	Evernham Motorsports	Dodge	38.377	187.612
21	17	Matt Kenseth	Roush Racing	Ford	38.394	187.529
22	41	Casey Mears	Chip Ganassi Racing	Dodge	38.411	187.446
23	99	Jeff Burton	Roush Racing	Ford	38.412	187.441
24	23	Kenny Wallace	Bill Davis Racing	Dodge	38.414	187.432
25	88	Dale Jarrett	Robert Yates Racing	Ford	38.463	187.193
26	10	Johnny Benson Jr.	MB2 Motorsports	Pontiac	38.492	187.052
27	11	Brett Bodine	Brett Bodine Racing	Ford	38.504	186.994
28	49	Ken Schrader	BAM Racing	Dodge	38.521	186.911
29	16	Greg Biffle	Roush Racing	Ford	38.526	186.887
30	40	Sterling Marlin	Chip Ganassi Racing	Dodge	38.534	186.848
31	22	Ward Burton	Bill Davis Racing	Dodge	38.552	186.761
32	21	Ricky Rudd	Wood Brothers Racing	Ford	38.581	186.620
33	30	Steve Park	Richard Childress Racing	Chevrolet	38.593	186.562
34	01	Mike Wallace	MB2 Motorsports	Pontiac	38.618	186.442
35	37	Derrike Cope	Quest Motor Racing	Chevrolet	38.632	186.374
36	43	Christian Fittipaldi	Petty Enterprises	Dodge	38.651	186.282
Provisionals
37	32	Ricky Craven	PPI Motorsports	Pontiac	39.101	184.139
38	77	Dave Blaney	Jasper Motorsports	Ford	38.819	185.476
39	42	Jamie McMurray	Chip Ganassi Racing	Dodge	38.670	186.191
40	7	Jimmy Spencer	Ultra Motorsports	Dodge	46.798	153.853
41	54	Todd Bodine	BelCar Motorsports	Ford	38.748	185.816
42	45	Kyle Petty	Petty Enterprises	Dodge	38.661	186.234
43	74	Tony Raines	BACE Motorsports	Chevrolet	38.681	186.138
Failed to qualify
44	4	Mike Skinner	Morgan–McClure Motorsports	Pontiac	38.729	185.907
45	14	Larry Foyt	A. J. Foyt Enterprises	Dodge	38.918	185.004
Official qualifying results

== Race results ==
Fin	St	#	Driver	Team	Make	Laps	Led	Status	Pts	Winnings
1	4	97	Kurt Busch	Roush Racing	Ford	200	24	running	180	$172,650
2	1	18	Bobby Labonte	Joe Gibbs Racing	Chevrolet	200	0	running	170	$142,858
3	6	24	Jeff Gordon	Hendrick Motorsports	Chevrolet	200	17	running	170	$126,228
4	21	17	Matt Kenseth	Roush Racing	Ford	200	0	running	160	$93,275
5	9	15	Michael Waltrip	Dale Earnhardt, Inc.	Chevrolet	200	0	running	155	$81,475
6	30	40	Sterling Marlin	Chip Ganassi Racing	Dodge	200	102	running	160	$114,540
7	3	8	Dale Earnhardt Jr.	Dale Earnhardt, Inc.	Chevrolet	200	1	running	151	$100,607
8	2	20	Tony Stewart	Joe Gibbs Racing	Chevrolet	200	51	running	147	$110,843
9	15	6	Mark Martin	Roush Racing	Ford	200	0	running	138	$96,248
10	5	5	Terry Labonte	Hendrick Motorsports	Chevrolet	200	0	running	134	$89,571
11	23	99	Jeff Burton	Roush Racing	Ford	200	0	running	130	$93,447
12	17	2	Rusty Wallace	Penske Racing	Dodge	200	0	running	127	$93,457
13	20	19	Jeremy Mayfield	Evernham Motorsports	Dodge	200	0	running	124	$67,290
14	39	42	Jamie McMurray	Chip Ganassi Racing	Dodge	200	0	running	121	$63,590
15	37	32	Ricky Craven	PPI Motorsports	Pontiac	200	0	running	118	$83,590
16	11	48	Jimmie Johnson	Hendrick Motorsports	Chevrolet	199	0	running	115	$71,890
17	7	38	Elliott Sadler	Robert Yates Racing	Ford	199	0	running	112	$90,440
18	10	29	Kevin Harvick	Richard Childress Racing	Chevrolet	199	0	running	109	$91,468
19	14	0	Jack Sprague	Haas CNC Racing	Pontiac	199	0	running	106	$55,290
20	22	41	Casey Mears	Chip Ganassi Racing	Dodge	199	0	running	103	$80,190
21	12	25	Joe Nemechek	Hendrick Motorsports	Chevrolet	199	0	running	100	$54,540
22	19	31	Robby Gordon	Richard Childress Racing	Chevrolet	199	0	running	97	$79,427
23	34	01	Mike Wallace	MB2 Motorsports	Pontiac	199	0	running	94	$67,790
24	16	9	Bill Elliott	Evernham Motorsports	Dodge	199	0	running	91	$89,223
25	24	23	Kenny Wallace	Bill Davis Racing	Dodge	199	0	running	88	$64,290
26	26	10	Johnny Benson Jr.	MB2 Motorsports	Pontiac	199	0	running	85	$79,790
27	33	30	Steve Park	Richard Childress Racing	Chevrolet	199	0	running	82	$60,775
28	13	1	Jeff Green	Dale Earnhardt, Inc.	Chevrolet	199	0	running	79	$77,812
29	40	7	Jimmy Spencer	Ultra Motorsports	Dodge	199	0	running	76	$60,304
30	31	22	Ward Burton	Bill Davis Racing	Dodge	199	0	running	73	$85,896
31	29	16	Greg Biffle	Roush Racing	Ford	199	1	running	75	$49,190
32	25	88	Dale Jarrett	Robert Yates Racing	Ford	199	0	running	67	$94,893
33	43	74	Tony Raines	BACE Motorsports	Chevrolet	199	0	running	64	$49,940
34	42	45	Kyle Petty	Petty Enterprises	Dodge	199	0	running	61	$56,935
35	36	43	Christian Fittipaldi	Petty Enterprises	Dodge	199	1	running	63	$84,573
36	18	02	Hermie Sadler	SCORE Motorsports	Chevrolet	198	1	running	60	$48,745
37	41	54	Todd Bodine	BelCar Motorsports	Ford	191	0	crash	52	$48,695
38	38	77	Dave Blaney	Jasper Motorsports	Ford	167	0	running	49	$56,585
39	27	11	Geoff Bodine	Brett Bodine Racing	Ford	119	0	vibration	46	$48,550
40	35	37	Derrike Cope	Quest Motor Racing	Chevrolet	68	0	engine	43	$48,515
41	8	12	Ryan Newman	Penske Racing	Dodge	36	2	engine	45	$78,355
42	28	49	Ken Schrader	BAM Racing	Dodge	1	0	crash	37	$48,440
43	32	21	Ricky Rudd	Wood Brothers Racing	Ford	1	0	crash	34	$55,765
Official race results

Previous race: 2003 Pocono 500	NASCAR Winston Cup Series; 2003 season	Next race: 2003 Dodge/Save Mart 350
