= 2005 Sirius Satellite Radio at The Glen =

Race details
- Race 22 of 36 in the 2005 NASCAR Nextel Cup Series
- The 2005 Sirius Satellite Radio at The Glen program cover.
- Date: August 14, 2005
- Official name: 20th Annual Sirius Satellite Radio at The Glen
- Location: Watkins Glen, New York, Watkins Glen International
- Course: Permanent racing facility
- Course length: 2.454 miles (3.949 km)
- Distance: 92 laps, 225.4 mi (362.746 km)
- Scheduled distance: 90 laps, 220.5 mi (354.86 km)
- Average speed: 86.804 miles per hour (139.697 km/h)
- Attendance: 85,000

Pole position
Driver	Tony Stewart	Joe Gibbs Racing
- Time: Set by 2005 owner's points

Most laps led
Driver	Tony Stewart	Joe Gibbs Racing
- Laps: 83

Winner
No. 20	Tony Stewart	Joe Gibbs Racing

Television in the United States
- Network: NBC
- Announcers: Bill Weber, Benny Parsons, Wally Dallenbach Jr.

Radio in the United States
- Radio: Motor Racing Network

The 2005 Sirius Satellite Radio at The Glen was the 22nd stock car race of the 2005 NASCAR Nextel Cup Series season and the 20th iteration of the event. The race was held on Sunday, August 14, 2005 in Watkins Glen, New York before a crowd of 85,000 at the shortened layout of Watkins Glen International, a 2.454 miles (3.949 km) permanent road course. The race was extended from 90 to 92 laps due to a green–white–checkered finish caused by an accident including Kurt Busch and Jorge Goeters in the bus stop. At race's end, Tony Stewart of Joe Gibbs Racing would defend his domination of the race on the final restart to win his 24th career NASCAR Nextel Cup Series win and his fifth of the season. To fill out the podium, Robby Gordon of Robby Gordon Motorsports and Boris Said of MB Sutton Motorsports would finish second and third, respectively.

== Background ==
The layout of Watkins Glen International NASCAR uses.

Watkins Glen International (nicknamed "The Glen") is an automobile race track located in Watkins Glen, New York at the southern tip of Seneca Lake. It was long known around the world as the home of the Formula One United States Grand Prix, which it hosted for twenty consecutive years (1961–1980), but the site has been home to road racing of nearly every class, including the World Sportscar Championship, Trans-Am, Can-Am, NASCAR Sprint Cup Series, the International Motor Sports Association and the IndyCar Series.

Initially, public roads in the village were used for the race course. In 1956 a permanent circuit for the race was built. In 1968 the race was extended to six hours, becoming the 6 Hours of Watkins Glen. The circuit's current layout has more or less been the same since 1971, although a chicane was installed at the uphill Esses in 1975 to slow cars through these corners, where there was a fatality during practice at the 1973 United States Grand Prix. The chicane was removed in 1985, but another chicane called the "Inner Loop" was installed in 1992 after J. D. McDuffie's fatal accident during the previous year's NASCAR Winston Cup event.

The circuit is known as the Mecca of North American road racing and is a very popular venue among fans and drivers. The facility is currently owned by International Speedway Corporation.

=== Entry list ===
No.	Driver	Team	Make
0	Mike Bliss	Haas CNC Racing	Chevrolet
1	Paul Menard	Dale Earnhardt, Inc.	Chevrolet
01	Joe Nemechek	MB2 Motorsports	Chevrolet
2	Rusty Wallace	Penske Racing	Dodge
4	P. J. Jones	Morgan–McClure Motorsports	Chevrolet
5	Kyle Busch	Hendrick Motorsports	Chevrolet
6	Mark Martin	Roush Racing	Ford
7	Robby Gordon	Robby Gordon Motorsports	Chevrolet
07	Dave Blaney	Richard Childress Racing	Chevrolet
8	Dale Earnhardt Jr.	Dale Earnhardt, Inc.	Chevrolet
9	Kasey Kahne	Evernham Motorsports	Dodge
10	Scott Riggs	MBV Motorsports	Chevrolet
11	Terry Labonte	Joe Gibbs Racing	Chevrolet
12	Ryan Newman	Penske Racing	Dodge
15	Michael Waltrip	Dale Earnhardt, Inc.	Chevrolet
16	Greg Biffle	Roush Racing	Ford
17	Matt Kenseth	Roush Racing	Ford
18	Bobby Labonte	Joe Gibbs Racing	Chevrolet
19	Jeremy Mayfield	Evernham Motorsports	Dodge
20	Tony Stewart	Joe Gibbs Racing	Chevrolet
21	Ricky Rudd	Wood Brothers Racing	Ford
22	Scott Wimmer	Bill Davis Racing	Dodge
24	Jeff Gordon	Hendrick Motorsports	Chevrolet
25	Brian Vickers	Hendrick Motorsports	Chevrolet
27	Tom Hubert	Kirk Shelmerdine Racing	Ford
29	Kevin Harvick	Richard Childress Racing	Chevrolet
31	Jeff Burton	Richard Childress Racing	Chevrolet
32	Ron Fellows	PPI Motorsports	Chevrolet
36	Boris Said	MB Sutton Motorsports	Chevrolet
37	Anthony Lazzaro	R&J Racing	Dodge
38	Elliott Sadler	Robert Yates Racing	Ford
39	Scott Pruett	Chip Ganassi Racing with Felix Sabates	Dodge
40	Sterling Marlin*	Chip Ganassi Racing with Felix Sabates	Dodge
41	Casey Mears	Chip Ganassi Racing with Felix Sabates	Dodge
42	Jamie McMurray	Chip Ganassi Racing with Felix Sabates	Dodge
43	Jeff Green	Petty Enterprises	Dodge
45	Kyle Petty	Petty Enterprises	Dodge
48	Jimmie Johnson	Hendrick Motorsports	Chevrolet
49	Ken Schrader	BAM Racing	Dodge
50	Jorge Goeters	Arnold Motorsports	Dodge
52	José Luis Ramírez**	Rick Ware Racing	Dodge
77	Travis Kvapil	Penske Racing	Dodge
87	Chris Cook	NEMCO Motorsports	Chevrolet
88	Dale Jarrett	Robert Yates Racing	Ford
89	Morgan Shepherd**	Shepherd Racing Ventures	Dodge
92	Johnny Miller	Front Row Motorsports	Chevrolet
97	Kurt Busch	Roush Racing	Ford
99	Carl Edwards	Roush Racing	Ford
Official entry list

*Marlin would have to sit the weekend out due to attending his father's funeral. While David Stremme would drive the #40 in pre-race activities, he was eventually switched to Scott Pruett for the race after Pruett did not qualify due to qualifying being cancelled.

== Practice ==
Originally, two practices were scheduled to occur during race weekend. However, rain would cancel Happy Hour, so only one practice would be run.

=== First and final practice ===
The first and final practice was held on 1:20 PM EST, and would last one hour and 20 minutes. Tony Stewart of Joe Gibbs Racing would set the fastest time in the session with a lap of 1:12.264 and an average speed of 122.052 miles per hour (196.424 km/h).

Pos.	No.	Driver	Team	Make	Time	Speed
1	20	Tony Stewart	Joe Gibbs Racing	Chevrolet	1:12.264	122.052
2	39	Scott Pruett	Chip Ganassi Racing with Felix Sabates	Dodge	1:13.227	120.447
3	6	Mark Martin	Roush Racing	Ford	1:13.231	120.441
Full practice results

== Starting lineup ==
Qualifying would occur on Saturday, August 13, at 11:10 AM EST. Drivers would each have two laps to set a fastest lap- whichever lap was fastest would be their official lap time.

However, rain would pour on the track during Anthony Lazzaro's run. After continuous downpour, NASCAR decided to scrap qualifying and make the starting lineup based on the current 2005 owner's points. As a result, Tony Stewart of Joe Gibbs Racing would win the pole.

Pos.	No.	Driver	Team	Make
1	20	Tony Stewart	Joe Gibbs Racing	Chevrolet
2	48	Jimmie Johnson	Hendrick Motorsports	Chevrolet
3	16	Greg Biffle	Roush Racing	Ford
4	2	Rusty Wallace	Penske Racing	Dodge
5	97	Kurt Busch	Roush Racing	Ford
6	6	Mark Martin	Roush Racing	Ford
7	12	Ryan Newman	Penske Racing	Dodge
8	19	Jeremy Mayfield	Evernham Motorsports	Dodge
9	88	Dale Jarrett	Robert Yates Racing	Ford
10	99	Carl Edwards	Roush Racing	Ford
11	42	Jamie McMurray	Chip Ganassi Racing with Felix Sabates	Dodge
12	38	Elliott Sadler	Robert Yates Racing	Ford
13	29	Kevin Harvick	Richard Childress Racing	Chevrolet
14	24	Jeff Gordon	Hendrick Motorsports	Chevrolet
15	17	Matt Kenseth	Roush Racing	Ford
16	8	Dale Earnhardt Jr.	Dale Earnhardt, Inc.	Chevrolet
17	01	Joe Nemechek	MB2 Motorsports	Chevrolet
18	31	Jeff Burton	Richard Childress Racing	Chevrolet
19	15	Michael Waltrip	Dale Earnhardt, Inc.	Chevrolet
20	5	Kyle Busch	Hendrick Motorsports	Chevrolet
21	9	Kasey Kahne	Evernham Motorsports	Dodge
22	25	Brian Vickers	Hendrick Motorsports	Chevrolet
23	18	Bobby Labonte	Joe Gibbs Racing	Chevrolet
24	41	Casey Mears	Chip Ganassi Racing with Felix Sabates	Dodge
25	40	David Stremme	Chip Ganassi Racing with Felix Sabates	Dodge
26	21	Ricky Rudd	Wood Brothers Racing	Ford
27	0	Mike Bliss	Haas CNC Racing	Chevrolet
28	49	Ken Schrader	BAM Racing	Dodge
29	45	Kyle Petty	Petty Enterprises	Dodge
30	07	Dave Blaney	Richard Childress Racing	Chevrolet
31	10	Scott Riggs	MBV Motorsports	Chevrolet
32	43	Jeff Green	Petty Enterprises	Dodge
33	77	Travis Kvapil	Penske Racing	Dodge
34	22	Scott Wimmer	Bill Davis Racing	Dodge
35	11	Terry Labonte	Joe Gibbs Racing	Chevrolet
36	4	P. J. Jones	Morgan–McClure Motorsports	Chevrolet
37	32	Ron Fellows	PPI Motorsports	Chevrolet
38	37	Anthony Lazzaro	R&J Racing	Dodge
39	7	Robby Gordon	Robby Gordon Motorsports	Chevrolet
40	92	Johnny Miller	Front Row Motorsports	Chevrolet
41	36	Boris Said	MB Sutton Motorsports	Chevrolet
42	1	Paul Menard	Dale Earnhardt, Inc.	Chevrolet
43	50	Jorge Goeters	Arnold Motorsports	Dodge
Failed to qualify or withdrew
44	39	Scott Pruett	Chip Ganassi Racing with Felix Sabates	Dodge
45	87	Chris Cook	NEMCO Motorsports	Chevrolet
46	27	Tom Hubert	Kirk Shelmerdine Racing	Ford
WD	52	José Luis Ramírez	Rick Ware Racing	Dodge
WD	89	Morgan Shepherd	Shepherd Racing Ventures	Dodge
Official starting lineup

== Race results ==
Fin	St	No.	Driver	Team	Make	Laps	Led	Status	Pts	Winnings
1	1	20	Tony Stewart	Joe Gibbs Racing	Chevrolet	92	83	running	190	$269,006
2	39	7	Robby Gordon	Robby Gordon Motorsports	Chevrolet	92	2	running	175	$151,345
3	41	36	Boris Said	MB Sutton Motorsports	Chevrolet	92	0	running	165	$116,460
4	25	40	Scott Pruett	Chip Ganassi Racing with Felix Sabates	Dodge	92	0	running	160	$129,858
5	2	48	Jimmie Johnson	Hendrick Motorsports	Chevrolet	92	2	running	160	$136,596
6	4	2	Rusty Wallace	Penske Racing	Dodge	92	0	running	150	$115,923
7	6	6	Mark Martin	Roush Racing	Ford	92	0	running	146	$94,960
8	22	25	Brian Vickers	Hendrick Motorsports	Chevrolet	92	0	running	142	$83,060
9	17	01	Joe Nemechek	MB2 Motorsports	Chevrolet	92	0	running	138	$99,638
10	16	8	Dale Earnhardt Jr.	Dale Earnhardt, Inc.	Chevrolet	92	0	running	134	$117,948
11	8	19	Jeremy Mayfield	Evernham Motorsports	Dodge	92	0	running	130	$97,325
12	12	38	Elliott Sadler	Robert Yates Racing	Ford	92	0	running	127	$105,641
13	11	42	Jamie McMurray	Chip Ganassi Racing with Felix Sabates	Dodge	92	0	running	124	$76,675
14	14	24	Jeff Gordon	Hendrick Motorsports	Chevrolet	92	2	running	126	$111,121
15	13	29	Kevin Harvick	Richard Childress Racing	Chevrolet	92	0	running	118	$109,331
16	26	21	Ricky Rudd	Wood Brothers Racing	Ford	92	0	running	115	$92,589
17	21	9	Kasey Kahne	Evernham Motorsports	Dodge	92	0	running	112	$96,630
18	15	17	Matt Kenseth	Roush Racing	Ford	92	0	running	109	$108,471
19	10	99	Carl Edwards	Roush Racing	Ford	92	0	running	106	$78,280
20	29	45	Kyle Petty	Petty Enterprises	Dodge	92	0	running	103	$81,993
21	34	22	Scott Wimmer	Bill Davis Racing	Dodge	92	0	running	100	$85,618
22	9	88	Dale Jarrett	Robert Yates Racing	Ford	92	0	running	97	$97,298
23	24	41	Casey Mears	Chip Ganassi Racing with Felix Sabates	Dodge	92	0	running	94	$83,428
24	32	43	Jeff Green	Petty Enterprises	Dodge	92	0	running	91	$91,496
25	37	32	Ron Fellows	PPI Motorsports	Chevrolet	92	0	running	88	$72,272
26	27	0	Mike Bliss	Haas CNC Racing	Chevrolet	92	0	running	85	$62,065
27	42	1	Paul Menard	Dale Earnhardt, Inc.	Chevrolet	92	0	running	82	$58,755
28	38	37	Anthony Lazzaro	R&J Racing	Dodge	92	0	running	79	$61,595
29	40	92	Johnny Miller	Front Row Motorsports	Chevrolet	92	0	running	76	$58,375
30	7	12	Ryan Newman	Penske Racing	Dodge	92	1	running	78	$103,266
31	31	10	Scott Riggs	MBV Motorsports	Chevrolet	92	0	running	70	$69,615
32	28	49	Ken Schrader	BAM Racing	Dodge	92	0	running	67	$60,425
33	20	5	Kyle Busch	Hendrick Motorsports	Chevrolet	92	0	running	64	$68,225
34	30	07	Dave Blaney	Richard Childress Racing	Chevrolet	92	0	running	61	$65,640
35	43	50	Jorge Goeters	Arnold Motorsports	Dodge	91	1	running	63	$57,500
36	23	18	Bobby Labonte	Joe Gibbs Racing	Chevrolet	86	0	engine	55	$91,900
37	35	11	Terry Labonte	Joe Gibbs Racing	Chevrolet	86	0	running	52	$57,200
38	3	16	Greg Biffle	Roush Racing	Ford	84	0	running	49	$75,050
39	5	97	Kurt Busch	Roush Racing	Ford	80	0	crash	46	$109,350
40	33	77	Travis Kvapil	Penske Racing	Dodge	76	0	running	43	$64,775
41	19	15	Michael Waltrip	Dale Earnhardt, Inc.	Chevrolet	71	1	crash	45	$83,839
42	36	4	P. J. Jones	Morgan–McClure Motorsports	Chevrolet	41	0	crash	37	$56,505
43	18	31	Jeff Burton	Richard Childress Racing	Chevrolet	31	0	crash	34	$83,058
Official race results

Previous race: 2005 Brickyard 400	NASCAR Nextel Cup Series; 2005 season	Next race: 2005 GFS Marketplace 400
