= 2003 Pocono 500 =

14th race of the 2003 NASCAR Winston Cup Series

Race details
- Race 14 of 36 in the 2003 NASCAR Sprint Cup Series
- The 2003 Pocono 500 program cover, featuring Dale Jarrett, winner of the 2002 race.
- Date: June 8, 2003
- Official name: 22nd Annual Pocono 500
- Location: Long Pond, Pennsylvania, Pocono Raceway
- Course: Permanent racing facility
- Course length: 2.5 miles (4.0 km)
- Distance: 200 laps, 500 mi (804.672 km)
- Scheduled distance: 200 laps, 500 mi (804.672 km)
- Average speed: 134.892 miles per hour (217.088 km/h)
- Attendance: 100,000

Pole position
Driver	Jimmie Johnson	Hendrick Motorsports
- Time: 52.741

Most laps led
Driver	Sterling Marlin	Chip Ganassi Racing
- Laps: 44

Winner
No. 20	Tony Stewart	Joe Gibbs Racing

Television in the United States
- Network: FOX
- Announcers: Mike Joy, Larry McReynolds, Darrell Waltrip

Radio in the United States
- Radio: Motor Racing Network

The 2003 Pocono 500 was the 14th stock car race of the 2003 NASCAR Winston Cup Series season and the 22nd iteration of the event. The race was held on Sunday, June 8, 2003, before a crowd of 100,000 in Long Pond, Pennsylvania, at Pocono Raceway, a 2.5 miles (4.0 km) triangular permanent course. The race took the scheduled 200 laps to complete. On the final round of pit stops on lap 190, Tony Stewart of Joe Gibbs Racing would cycle to the lead and hold off the field to win under caution when a crash occurred on lap 198 to give Stewart his 16th career NASCAR Winston Cup Series win and his first of the season. To fill out the podium, Mark Martin and Matt Kenseth of Roush Racing would finish second and third, respectively.

== Background ==
The layout of Pocono Raceway, the venue where the race was held.

The race was held at Pocono Raceway, which is a three-turn superspeedway located in Long Pond, Pennsylvania. Pocono Raceway is one of a very few NASCAR tracks not owned by either Speedway Motorsports or NASCAR. It is operated by the Igdalsky siblings Brandon, Nicholas, and sister Ashley, and cousins Joseph IV and Chase Mattioli, all of whom are third-generation members of the family-owned Mattco Inc, started by Joseph II and Rose Mattioli.

=== Entry list ===
#	Driver	Team	Make
0	Jack Sprague	Haas CNC Racing	Pontiac
1	Jeff Green	Dale Earnhardt, Inc.	Chevrolet
01	Mike Wallace	MB2 Motorsports	Pontiac
2	Rusty Wallace	Penske Racing	Dodge
4	Mike Skinner	Morgan–McClure Motorsports	Pontiac
5	Terry Labonte	Hendrick Motorsports	Chevrolet
6	Mark Martin	Roush Racing	Ford
7	Jimmy Spencer	Ultra Motorsports	Dodge
8	Dale Earnhardt Jr.	Dale Earnhardt, Inc.	Chevrolet
9	Bill Elliott	Evernham Motorsports	Dodge
10	Johnny Benson Jr.	MB2 Motorsports	Pontiac
12	Ryan Newman	Penske Racing	Dodge
14	Larry Foyt	A. J. Foyt Enterprises	Dodge
15	Michael Waltrip	Dale Earnhardt, Inc.	Chevrolet
16	Greg Biffle	Roush Racing	Ford
17	Matt Kenseth	Roush Racing	Ford
18	Bobby Labonte	Joe Gibbs Racing	Chevrolet
19	Jeremy Mayfield	Evernham Motorsports	Dodge
20	Tony Stewart	Joe Gibbs Racing	Chevrolet
21	Ricky Rudd	Wood Brothers Racing	Ford
22	Ward Burton	Bill Davis Racing	Dodge
23	Kenny Wallace	Bill Davis Racing	Dodge
24	Jeff Gordon	Hendrick Motorsports	Chevrolet
25	Joe Nemechek	Hendrick Motorsports	Chevrolet
29	Kevin Harvick	Richard Childress Racing	Chevrolet
30	Steve Park	Richard Childress Racing	Chevrolet
31	Robby Gordon	Richard Childress Racing	Chevrolet
32	Ricky Craven	PPI Motorsports	Pontiac
37	Derrike Cope	Quest Motor Racing	Chevrolet
38	Elliott Sadler	Robert Yates Racing	Ford
40	Sterling Marlin	Chip Ganassi Racing	Dodge
41	Casey Mears	Chip Ganassi Racing	Dodge
42	Jamie McMurray	Chip Ganassi Racing	Dodge
43	John Andretti	Petty Enterprises	Dodge
45	Kyle Petty	Petty Enterprises	Dodge
46	Carl Long*	Glenn Racing	Dodge
48	Jimmie Johnson	Hendrick Motorsports	Chevrolet
49	Ken Schrader	BAM Racing	Dodge
54	Todd Bodine	BelCar Motorsports	Ford
74	Tony Raines	BACE Motorsports	Chevrolet
77	Dave Blaney	Jasper Motorsports	Ford
88	Dale Jarrett	Robert Yates Racing	Ford
89	Morgan Shepherd	Shepherd Racing Ventures	Ford
91	Casey Atwood	Evernham Motorsports	Dodge
97	Kurt Busch	Roush Racing	Ford
99	Jeff Burton	Roush Racing	Ford
Official entry list

*Withdrew.

== Practice ==
Originally, three practice sessions were going to be held, with one session on Friday, and two on Saturday. However, rain on Saturday would cancel both Saturday practices.

The first and only practice session was held on Friday, June 6, at 11:20 AM EST, and would last for two hours. Tony Stewart of Joe Gibbs Racing would set the fastest time in the session, with a lap of 52.654 and an average speed of 170.927 miles per hour (275.080 km/h).

Pos.	#	Driver	Team	Make	Time	Speed
1	20	Tony Stewart	Joe Gibbs Racing	Chevrolet	52.654	170.927
2	8	Dale Earnhardt Jr.	Dale Earnhardt, Inc.	Chevrolet	52.680	170.843
3	12	Ryan Newman	Penske Racing	Dodge	52.686	170.823
Full practice results

== Qualifying ==
Qualifying was held on Friday, June 6, at 3:00 PM EST. Each driver would have two laps to set a fastest time; the fastest of the two would count as their official qualifying lap. Positions 1-36 would be decided on time, while positions 37-43 would be based on provisionals. Six spots are awarded by the use of provisionals based on owner's points. The seventh is awarded to a past champion who has not otherwise qualified for the race. If no past champ needs the provisional, the next team in the owner points will be awarded a provisional.

Jimmie Johnson of Hendrick Motorsports would win the pole, setting a time of 52.741 and an average speed of 170.645 miles per hour (274.627 km/h).

Two drivers would fail to qualify: Derrike Cope and Morgan Shepherd.

=== Full qualifying results ===
Pos.	#	Driver	Team	Make	Time	Speed
1	48	Jimmie Johnson	Hendrick Motorsports	Chevrolet	52.741	170.645
2	12	Ryan Newman	Penske Racing	Dodge	52.782	170.513
3	18	Bobby Labonte	Joe Gibbs Racing	Chevrolet	52.845	170.309
4	20	Tony Stewart	Joe Gibbs Racing	Chevrolet	52.878	170.203
5	8	Dale Earnhardt Jr.	Dale Earnhardt, Inc.	Chevrolet	52.894	170.152
6	6	Mark Martin	Roush Racing	Ford	52.942	169.997
7	88	Dale Jarrett	Robert Yates Racing	Ford	53.026	169.728
8	9	Bill Elliott	Evernham Motorsports	Dodge	53.048	169.658
9	38	Elliott Sadler	Robert Yates Racing	Ford	53.061	169.616
10	97	Kurt Busch	Roush Racing	Ford	53.079	169.559
11	5	Terry Labonte	Hendrick Motorsports	Chevrolet	53.106	169.472
12	24	Jeff Gordon	Hendrick Motorsports	Chevrolet	53.113	169.450
13	15	Michael Waltrip	Dale Earnhardt, Inc.	Chevrolet	53.114	169.447
14	54	Todd Bodine	BelCar Motorsports	Ford	53.145	169.348
15	25	Joe Nemechek	Hendrick Motorsports	Chevrolet	53.155	169.316
16	99	Jeff Burton	Roush Racing	Ford	53.156	169.313
17	22	Ward Burton	Bill Davis Racing	Dodge	53.242	169.040
18	0	Jack Sprague	Haas CNC Racing	Pontiac	53.307	168.833
19	41	Casey Mears	Chip Ganassi Racing	Dodge	53.355	168.682
20	29	Kevin Harvick	Richard Childress Racing	Chevrolet	53.370	168.634
21	43	John Andretti	Petty Enterprises	Dodge	53.485	168.271
22	77	Dave Blaney	Jasper Motorsports	Ford	53.498	168.231
23	40	Sterling Marlin	Chip Ganassi Racing	Dodge	53.518	168.168
24	10	Johnny Benson Jr.	MB2 Motorsports	Pontiac	53.540	168.099
25	17	Matt Kenseth	Roush Racing	Ford	53.542	168.092
26	16	Greg Biffle	Roush Racing	Ford	53.543	168.089
27	2	Rusty Wallace	Penske Racing	Dodge	53.566	168.017
28	42	Jamie McMurray	Chip Ganassi Racing	Dodge	53.612	167.873
29	21	Ricky Rudd	Wood Brothers Racing	Ford	53.627	167.826
30	7	Jimmy Spencer	Ultra Motorsports	Dodge	53.636	167.798
31	01	Mike Wallace	MB2 Motorsports	Pontiac	53.643	167.776
32	32	Ricky Craven	PPI Motorsports	Pontiac	53.651	167.751
33	19	Jeremy Mayfield	Evernham Motorsports	Dodge	53.663	167.713
34	91	Casey Atwood	Evernham Motorsports	Dodge	53.708	167.573
35	1	Jeff Green	Dale Earnhardt, Inc.	Chevrolet	53.716	167.548
36	30	Steve Park	Richard Childress Racing	Chevrolet	53.753	167.432
Provisionals
37	31	Robby Gordon	Richard Childress Racing	Chevrolet	54.045	166.528
38	23	Kenny Wallace	Bill Davis Racing	Dodge	53.793	167.308
39	49	Ken Schrader	BAM Racing	Dodge	54.114	166.316
40	45	Kyle Petty	Petty Enterprises	Dodge	53.910	166.945
41	4	Mike Skinner	Morgan–McClure Motorsports	Pontiac	53.970	166.759
42	74	Tony Raines	BACE Motorsports	Chevrolet	53.901	166.973
43	14	Larry Foyt	A. J. Foyt Enterprises	Dodge	55.931	160.913
Failed to qualify or withdrew
44	37	Derrike Cope	Quest Motor Racing	Chevrolet	54.920	163.875
45	89	Morgan Shepherd	Shepherd Racing Ventures	Ford	55.210	163.014
WD	46	Carl Long	Glenn Racing	Dodge	—	—
Official qualifying results

== Race results ==
Fin	St	#	Driver	Team	Make	Laps	Led	Status	Pts	Winnings
1	4	20	Tony Stewart	Joe Gibbs Racing	Chevrolet	200	37	running	180	$214,253
2	6	6	Mark Martin	Roush Racing	Ford	200	7	running	175	$152,278
3	25	17	Matt Kenseth	Roush Racing	Ford	200	10	running	170	$109,870
4	5	8	Dale Earnhardt Jr.	Dale Earnhardt, Inc.	Chevrolet	200	22	running	165	$116,272
5	2	12	Ryan Newman	Penske Racing	Dodge	200	1	running	160	$98,700
6	23	40	Sterling Marlin	Chip Ganassi Racing	Dodge	200	44	running	160	$104,490
7	11	5	Terry Labonte	Hendrick Motorsports	Chevrolet	200	1	running	151	$87,946
8	17	22	Ward Burton	Bill Davis Racing	Dodge	200	2	running	147	$91,146
9	9	38	Elliott Sadler	Robert Yates Racing	Ford	200	35	running	143	$101,040
10	32	32	Ricky Craven	PPI Motorsports	Pontiac	200	0	running	134	$83,490
11	14	54	Todd Bodine	BelCar Motorsports	Ford	200	3	running	135	$68,740
12	1	48	Jimmie Johnson	Hendrick Motorsports	Chevrolet	200	23	running	132	$80,375
13	12	24	Jeff Gordon	Hendrick Motorsports	Chevrolet	200	0	running	124	$95,568
14	16	99	Jeff Burton	Roush Racing	Ford	200	6	running	126	$84,507
15	33	19	Jeremy Mayfield	Evernham Motorsports	Dodge	200	0	running	118	$59,640
16	27	2	Rusty Wallace	Penske Racing	Dodge	200	0	running	115	$84,957
17	3	18	Bobby Labonte	Joe Gibbs Racing	Chevrolet	200	0	running	112	$91,973
18	13	15	Michael Waltrip	Dale Earnhardt, Inc.	Chevrolet	200	1	running	114	$64,090
19	8	9	Bill Elliott	Evernham Motorsports	Dodge	200	2	running	111	$84,673
20	26	16	Greg Biffle	Roush Racing	Ford	199	0	crash	103	$52,615
21	19	41	Casey Mears	Chip Ganassi Racing	Dodge	199	0	running	100	$69,990
22	18	0	Jack Sprague	Haas CNC Racing	Pontiac	199	0	running	97	$48,690
23	21	43	John Andretti	Petty Enterprises	Dodge	199	0	running	94	$84,143
24	24	10	Johnny Benson Jr.	MB2 Motorsports	Pontiac	199	0	running	91	$75,765
25	20	29	Kevin Harvick	Richard Childress Racing	Chevrolet	199	0	running	88	$84,018
26	22	77	Dave Blaney	Jasper Motorsports	Ford	199	0	running	85	$66,090
27	40	45	Kyle Petty	Petty Enterprises	Dodge	199	0	running	82	$55,340
28	37	31	Robby Gordon	Richard Childress Racing	Chevrolet	199	0	running	79	$72,377
29	38	23	Kenny Wallace	Bill Davis Racing	Dodge	199	0	running	76	$54,904
30	42	74	Tony Raines	BACE Motorsports	Chevrolet	199	0	running	73	$44,365
31	31	01	Mike Wallace	MB2 Motorsports	Pontiac	198	0	running	70	$43,715
32	28	42	Jamie McMurray	Chip Ganassi Racing	Dodge	198	0	running	67	$43,565
33	35	1	Jeff Green	Dale Earnhardt, Inc.	Chevrolet	197	1	crash	69	$68,552
34	41	4	Mike Skinner	Morgan–McClure Motorsports	Pontiac	197	0	crash	61	$44,065
35	36	30	Steve Park	Richard Childress Racing	Chevrolet	195	0	running	58	$50,990
36	10	97	Kurt Busch	Roush Racing	Ford	193	0	crash	55	$62,790
37	29	21	Ricky Rudd	Wood Brothers Racing	Ford	171	0	running	52	$50,625
38	15	25	Joe Nemechek	Hendrick Motorsports	Chevrolet	166	0	transmission	49	$42,500
39	30	7	Jimmy Spencer	Ultra Motorsports	Dodge	156	0	handling	46	$42,385
40	34	91	Casey Atwood	Evernham Motorsports	Dodge	77	0	engine	43	$42,230
41	43	14	Larry Foyt	A. J. Foyt Enterprises	Dodge	71	5	brakes	45	$42,090
42	7	88	Dale Jarrett	Robert Yates Racing	Ford	53	0	crash	37	$87,778
43	39	49	Ken Schrader	BAM Racing	Dodge	7	0	crash	34	$42,186
Official race results

Previous race: 2003 MBNA Armed Forces Family 400	NASCAR Winston Cup Series; 2003 season	Next race: 2003 Sirius 400
