= Joe Varde =

American sports car racing driver

- Born: April 3, 1950 (age 76); Tampa, Florida, U.S.

NASCAR Cup Series career
- 1 race run over 1 year
- Best finish: 84th (2002)
- First race: 2002 Sirius Satellite Radio at the Glen (Watkins Glen International)
| Wins | Top tens | Poles |
|---|---|---|
| 0 | 0 | 0 |

NASCAR O'Reilly Auto Parts Series career
- 1 race run over 1 year
- Best finish: 122nd (2001)
- First race: 2001 GNC Live Well 200 (Watkins Glen International)
| Wins | Top tens | Poles |
|---|---|---|
| 0 | 0 | 0 |

NASCAR FedEx Freight Truck Series career
- 1 race run over 1 year
- Best finish: 135th (2003)
- First race: 2003 Craftsman 200 (Darlington)
| Wins | Top tens | Poles |
|---|---|---|
| 0 | 0 | 0 |
- Statistics up to date as of February 29, 2012.

Joe Varde (born April 3, 1950) is an American road racer. A five-time International Motor Sports Association champion, he has also made a few starts in NASCAR competition, including racing in the Sprint Cup Series for BACE Motorsports in 2002 at Watkins Glen International. He is currently the director of competition for Team TGM in the IMSA Michelin Pilot Challenge.

== Motorsports career results ==
=== NASCAR ===
(key) (Bold - Pole position awarded by qualifying time. Italics - Pole position earned by points standings or practice time. * – Most laps led.)

==== Winston Cup Series ====
NASCAR Winston Cup Series results
| Year | Team | No. | Make | 1 | 2 | 3 | 4 | 5 | 6 | 7 | 8 | 9 | 10 | 11 | 12 | 13 | 14 | 15 | 16 | 17 | 18 | 19 | 20 | 21 | 22 | 23 | 24 | 25 | 26 | 27 | 28 | 29 | 30 | 31 | 32 | 33 | 34 | 35 | 36 | NWCC | Pts | Ref |
|---|---|---|---|---|---|---|---|---|---|---|---|---|---|---|---|---|---|---|---|---|---|---|---|---|---|---|---|---|---|---|---|---|---|---|---|---|---|---|---|---|---|---|
| 2002 | BACE Motorsports | 74 | Chevy | DAY | CAR | LVS | ATL | DAR | BRI | TEX | MAR | TAL | CAL | RCH | CLT | DOV | POC | MCH | SON | DAY | CHI | NHA | POC | IND | GLN; 42 | MCH | BRI | DAR | RCH | NHA | DOV | KAN | TAL | CLT | MAR | ATL | CAR | PHO | HOM | 84th | 37 | |
| 2003 | Joe Varde Racing | 35 | Chevy | DAY | CAR | LVS | ATL | DAR | BRI | TEX | TAL | MAR | CAL | RCH | CLT | DOV | POC | MCH | SON | DAY | CHI | NHA | POC | IND | GLN; DNQ | MCH | BRI | DAR | RCH | NHA | DOV | TAL | KAN | CLT | MAR | ATL | PHO | CAR | HOM | NA | - | |

==== Busch Series ====
NASCAR Busch Series results
| Year | Team | No. | Make | 1 | 2 | 3 | 4 | 5 | 6 | 7 | 8 | 9 | 10 | 11 | 12 | 13 | 14 | 15 | 16 | 17 | 18 | 19 | 20 | 21 | 22 | 23 | 24 | 25 | 26 | 27 | 28 | 29 | 30 | 31 | 32 | 33 | NBSC | Pts | Ref |
|---|---|---|---|---|---|---|---|---|---|---|---|---|---|---|---|---|---|---|---|---|---|---|---|---|---|---|---|---|---|---|---|---|---|---|---|---|---|---|---|
| 2001 | Team Amick Motorsports | 50 | Chevy | DAY | CAR | LVS | ATL | DAR | BRI | TEX | NSH | TAL | CAL | RCH | NHA | NZH | CLT | DOV | KEN | MLW | GLN; 38 | CHI | GTY | PPR | IRP | MCH | BRI | DAR | RCH | DOV | KAN | CLT | MEM | PHO | CAR | HOM | 122nd | 61 | |

==== Craftsman Truck Series ====
NASCAR Craftsman Truck Series results
| Year | Team | No. | Make | 1 | 2 | 3 | 4 | 5 | 6 | 7 | 8 | 9 | 10 | 11 | 12 | 13 | 14 | 15 | 16 | 17 | 18 | 19 | 20 | 21 | 22 | 23 | 24 | 25 | NCTC | Pts | Ref |
|---|---|---|---|---|---|---|---|---|---|---|---|---|---|---|---|---|---|---|---|---|---|---|---|---|---|---|---|---|---|---|---|
| 2003 | Morgan-Dollar Motorsports | 47 | Chevy | DAY | DAR; 33 | MMR | MAR | CLT | DOV | TEX | MEM | MLW | KAN | KEN | GTW | MCH | IRP | NSH | BRI | RCH | NHA | CAL | LVS | SBO | TEX | MAR | PHO | HOM | 135th | 0 | |
