= 2003 GFS Marketplace 400 =

Race details
- Race 23 of 36 in the 2003 NASCAR Winston Cup Series
- 2003 GFS Marketplace 400 program cover
- Date: August 17, 2003
- Location: Michigan International Speedway, Brooklyn, Michigan
- Course: Permanent racing facility
- Course length: 2.0 miles (3.2 km)
- Distance: 200 laps, 400 mi (643.737 km)
- Weather: Temperatures up to 88 °F (31 °C); wind speeds up to 13.81 miles per hour (22.23 km/h)
- Average speed: 127.31 mph (204.89 km/h)
- Attendance: 150,000

Pole position
Driver	Bobby Labonte	Joe Gibbs Racing
- Time: 37.847

Most laps led
Driver	Jimmie Johnson	Hendrick Motorsports
- Laps: 50

Winner
No. 12	Ryan Newman	Penske Racing South

Television in the United States
- Network: TNT
- Announcers: Allen Bestwick, Benny Parsons, Wally Dallenbach Jr.
- Nielsen ratings: 4.9 (Final); (6.23 million)

The 2003 GFS Marketplace 400 was the 23rd stock car race of the 2003 NASCAR Winston Cup Series. It was held on August 17, 2003, at Michigan International Speedway near Brooklyn, Michigan before a crowd of 150,000. The 200-lap race was won by Ryan Newman of the Penske Racing South team after he started from second position. Kevin Harvick of Richard Childress Racing finished second and Joe Gibbs Racing's Tony Stewart came in third.

== Report ==
=== Background ===
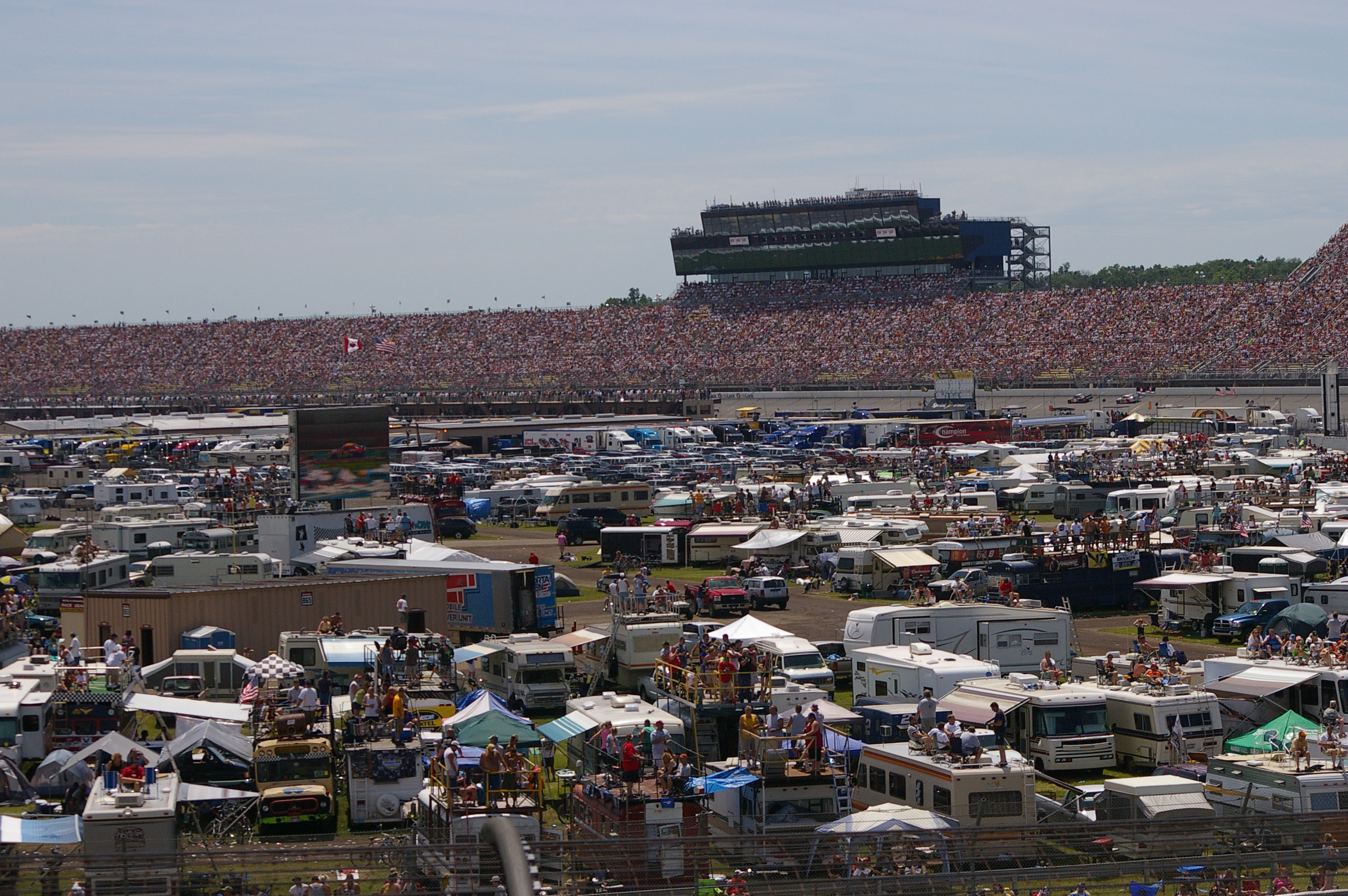
Michigan International Speedway, where the race was held.

The 2003 GFS Marketplace 400 was the 23rd of 36 scheduled stock car races of the 2003 NASCAR Winston Cup Series. It was held on August 17, 2003, in Brooklyn, Michigan, at Michigan International Speedway, one of six superspeedways to hold NASCAR races; the others are Daytona International Speedway, Auto Club Speedway, Indianapolis Motor Speedway, Pocono Raceway and Talladega Superspeedway. The standard track at Michigan International Speedway is a 2 mi (3.2 km) four-turn superspeedway. The track's turns are banked at eighteen degrees, while the front stretch (the location of the finish line) is banked at twelve degrees. The back stretch, has a five degree banking.

Before the race Matt Kenseth led the Drivers' Championship with 3,294 points, ahead of Dale Earnhardt Jr. in second and Jeff Gordon in third. Jimmie Johnson and Kevin Harvick was fourth and fifth, and Michael Waltrip, Bobby Labonte, Kurt Busch, Ryan Newman and Robby Gordon rounded out the top ten. Chevrolet led the Manufacturers' Championship with 158 points, 21 ahead of their rival Ford in second. Dodge was third on 110 and Pontiac was fourth with 79. Dale Jarrett was the race's defending champion.

=== Practice and qualifying ===
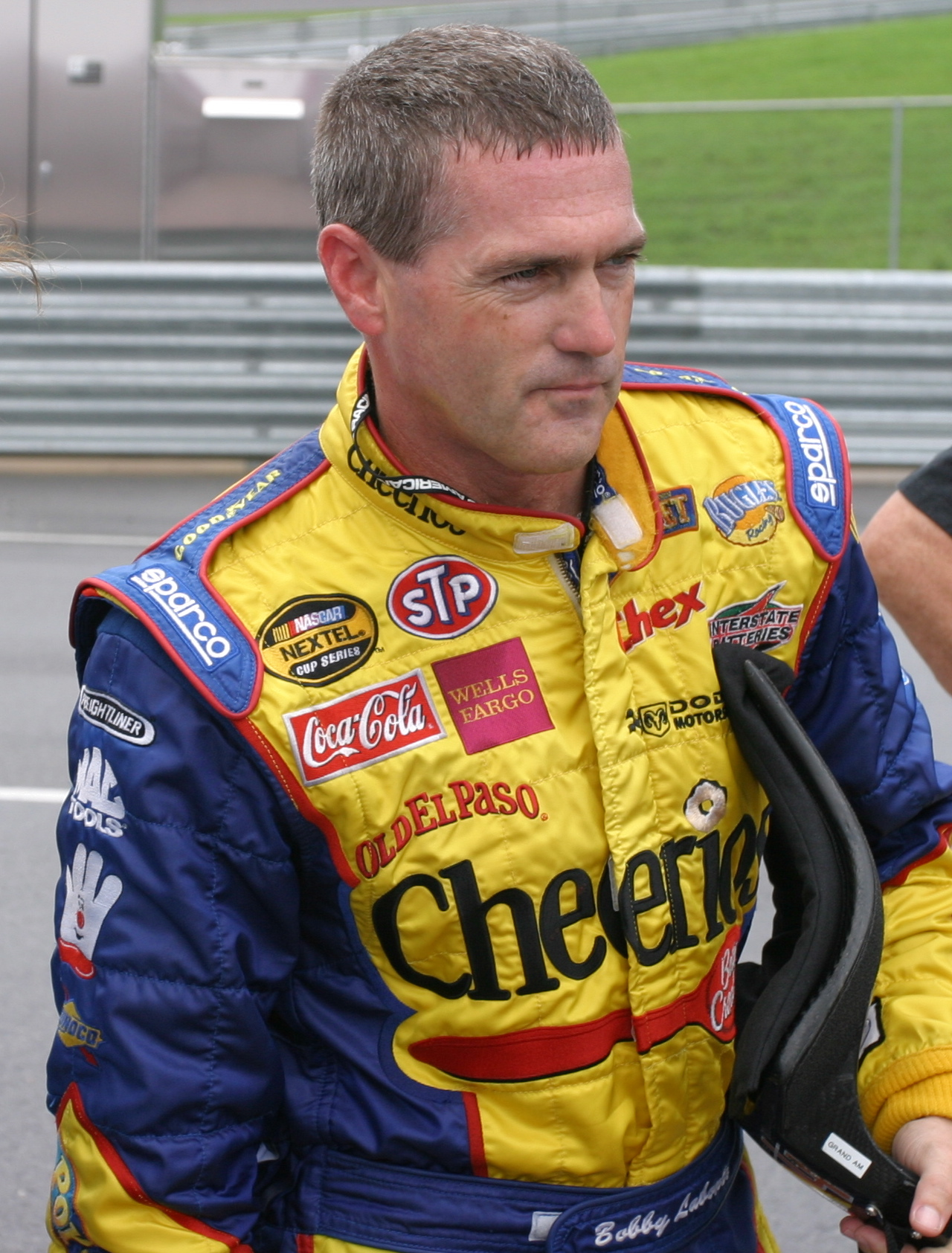
Bobby Labonte (pictured in 2006) had the twenty-fifth pole of his career.

Three practice sessions were held before the Sunday race; one on Friday and two on Saturday. The first practice session lasted 60 minutes, the second and final sessions lasted 45 minutes. Newman was fastest in the first practice session with a time of 38.221 seconds; Elliott Sadler was second and Harvick third. Bobby Labonte was fourth with a lap of 38.438 seconds, and Earnhardt placed fifth. Busch, Dale Jarrett, Johnson, Tony Stewart, Terry Labonte rounded out the session's top-ten drivers.

Although 44 drivers were entered in the qualifier; according to NASCAR's qualifying procedure only 43 could race. Each driver was limited to two timed laps, with the starting order determined by the competitor's fastest times. The qualifier was delayed for two hours because of rain which increased the track grip available to the drivers. Bobby Labonte clinched his second consecutive pole position at Michigan International Speedway, his fourth of the season and the 25th of his career with a time of 37.847 seconds. He was joined on the grid's front row by Newman. Robby Gordon qualified third, Kevin Lepage fourth, and Terry Labonte started fifth. Jason Leffler, Christian Fittipaldi, Jeff Burton, Dave Blaney and Jimmy Spencer rounded out the top ten qualifiers. Brett Bodine, Carl Long, Rich Bickle and Morgan Shepherd withdrew from the event prior to qualifying. The driver that failed to qualify was Stacy Compton. After the qualifier, Bobby Labonte said: "I just like coming here. It just falls into the category of a good track. The cars can race here from the white line (at the bottom of the banking) to the white wall, which is about 100 yards. That's a lot of fun."

On Saturday afternoon Johnson was fastest in the second practice session with a lap of 39.166 seconds, ahead of Bobby Labonte and Rusty Wallace. Harvick with a time of 39.224 was fourth-fastest; Sterling Marlin was fifth and Newman sixth. Greg Biffle, Terry Labonte, Johnny Benson Jr. and Stewart followed in the top ten. Later that day, Wallace paced the final practice session with a time of 39.816 seconds; Earnhardt was second and Busch. Jeff Green was fourth-fastest, ahead of Bobby Labonte and Newman. Waltrip was seventh-fastest, Stewart eighth, Jamie McMurray ninth and Biffle tenth. Jeremy Mayfield's tire blew, damaging his rear fender, and switched to a back-up car. Marlin's engine failed during the session, and Marlin changed engines.

== Results ==
Pos	St	No.	Driver	OWNER	Car	Laps	Money	Status	Led	Pts
1	2	12	Ryan Newman	Roger Penske	Dodge	200	155505	running	32	180
2	11	29	Kevin Harvick	Richard Childress	Chevrolet	200	147758	running	46	175
3	23	20	Tony Stewart	Joe Gibbs	Chevrolet	200	140063	running	0	165
4	12	16	Greg Biffle	Jack Roush	Ford	200	85670	running	19	165
5	18	30	Steve Park	Richard Childress	Chevrolet	200	76980	running	0	155
6	3	31	Robby Gordon	Richard Childress	Chevrolet	200	89402	running	0	150
7	13	15	Michael Waltrip	Dale Earnhardt, Inc.	Chevrolet	200	77915	running	0	146
8	30	49	Ken Schrader	Beth Ann Morgenthau	Dodge	200	79790	running	0	142
9	33	17	Matt Kenseth	Jack Roush	Ford	200	76540	running	0	138
10	35	10	Johnny Benson Jr.	James Rocco	Pontiac	200	94690	running	0	134
11	8	99	Jeff Burton	Jack Roush	Ford	200	92422	running	0	130
12	17	38	Elliott Sadler	Yates Racing	Ford	200	92515	running	0	127
13	5	5	Terry Labonte	Rick Hendrick	Chevrolet	200	84421	running	0	124
14	22	22	Ward Burton	Bill Davis	Dodge	200	90521	running	0	121
15	32	9	Bill Elliott	Ray Evernham	Dodge	200	92598	running	0	118
16	36	45	Kyle Petty	Petty Enterprises	Dodge	200	64540	running	0	115
17	37	6	Mark Martin	Jack Roush	Ford	200	89323	running	0	112
18	20	97	Kurt Busch	Jack Roush	Ford	200	96690	running	43	114
19	38	40	Sterling Marlin	Chip Ganassi	Dodge	200	95390	running	0	106
20	25	25	Joe Nemechek	Rick Hendrick	Chevrolet	200	56750	running	0	103
21	34	1	Jeff Green	Dale Earnhardt, Inc.	Chevrolet	200	76027	running	0	100
22	42	01	Mike Skinner	Nelson Bowers	Pontiac	200	66940	running	0	97
23	29	88	Dale Jarrett	Yates Racing	Ford	200	97093	running	5	99
24	24	74	Tony Raines	Bill Baumgardner	Chevrolet	200	50215	running	0	91
25	9	77	Dave Blaney	Doug Bawel	Ford	200	72065	running	0	88
26	10	7	Jimmy Spencer	Jim Smith	Dodge	200	61154	running	2	90
27	15	48	Jimmie Johnson	Rick Hendrick	Chevrolet	199	73875	running	50	92
28	40	19	Jeremy Mayfield	Ray Evernham	Dodge	199	60325	running	0	79
29	27	21	Ricky Rudd	Wood Brothers	Ford	199	60140	running	0	76
30	21	24	Jeff Gordon	Rick Hendrick	Chevrolet	198	96943	running	0	73
31	4	57	Kevin Lepage	Ted Campbell	Ford	197	49065	running	0	70
32	19	8	Dale Earnhardt Jr.	Dale Earnhardt, Inc.	Chevrolet	192	89782	crash	0	67
33	7	43	Christian Fittipaldi	Petty Enterprises	Dodge	176	87068	engine	0	64
34	43	37	Derrike Cope	Derrike Cope	Chevrolet	173	49585	running	0	61
35	6	0	Jason Leffler	Gene Haas	Pontiac	166	48540	running	0	58
36	26	42	Jamie McMurray	Chip Ganassi	Dodge	141	48490	crash	0	55
37	1	18	Bobby Labonte	Joe Gibbs	Chevrolet	140	99023	engine	3	57
38	31	2	Rusty Wallace	Roger Penske	Dodge	105	82997	engine	0	49
39	14	50	Larry Foyt	A. J. Foyt	Dodge	81	48295	transmission	0	46
40	39	32	Ricky Craven	Cal Wells	Pontiac	76	56235	crash	0	43
41	16	41	Casey Mears	Chip Ganassi	Dodge	76	56200	crash	0	40
42	28	23	Kenny Wallace	Bill Davis	Dodge	62	48160	crash	0	37
43	41	54	Todd Bodine	Travis Carter	Ford	62	47484	crash	0	34
Failed to qualify or withdrew
POS	NAME	NBR	OWNER	CAR						
44	Stacy Compton	4	Larry McClure	Pontiac						
WD	Brett Bodine	11	Brett Bodine	Ford						
WD	Carl Long	66	Travis Carter	Ford						
WD	Rich Bickle	79	John Conely	Chevrolet						
WD	Morgan Shepherd	89	Morgan Shepherd	Ford						

Previous race: 2003 Sirius Satellite Radio at The Glen	Winston Cup Series; 2003 season	Next race: 2003 Sharpie 500
