= BACE Motorsports =

Former NASCAR team

- Owner: Bill Baumgardner
- Base: Charlotte, North Carolina
- Series: Winston Cup, Busch Series
- Race drivers: Johnny Benson, Randy LaJoie, Chad Little, Tony Raines, Tim Fedewa
- Manufacturer: Chevrolet
- Opened: 1993
- Closed: 2005

Career
- Drivers' Championships: 3 (Busch Series)
- Race victories: 16

BACE Motorsports was a championship-winning NASCAR team. It was owned by entrepreneur Bill Baumgardner, who also founded Staff America. Baumgardner was inspired to start his own team after Staff America was a sponsor in the Busch Series for two years. The team was famous during its tenure for always running its familiar No. 74.

== Beginnings (1993) ==
BACE made its debut in 1993 at the season opening race at Daytona International Speedway. Jack Sprague was the driver, and he finished 44th after the engine expired. After that less-than-stellar debut, Sprague and BACE made a good turn around, and they soon became a consistent top-20 contender, and had three top-10 finishes. After the fall race at Dover International Speedway, BACE and Sprague parted ways, and Winston Cup star Ernie Irvan occupied the car for one race, but another driver took the reins as well, a young short-track driver named Johnny Benson.

== Championship years (1994–98) ==
With Steve "Birdie" Bird as the crew chief, Benson's rookie year with BACE started off slow, as he originally didn't finish higher than 16th. After a long string of finishes 22nd or worse, Benson put together two consecutive top-5 finishes at The Milwaukee Mile and South Boston Speedway, then had three more top-ten finishes before winning his first race at Dover. At the end of 1994, Benson was named the Busch Series Rookie of the Year and was sixth in points. Benson's momentum carried over into the following year. Along with Lipton Tea coming on board as sponsor, Benson won twice early in the season, and finished outside of the top-ten only nine times. The consistency was enough for him to clinch that year's championship. When Benson signed on with Bahari Racing for 1996, veteran Randy LaJoie was tabbed his replacement along with a new sponsor in Fina. LaJoie had no problem adjusting, and he won five times as well as a second straight championship for BACE; then he repeated the performance in 1997. 1997 also saw the appearance of a second BACE car, the No. 33 Kleenex team driven by Tim Fedewa. In two seasons, Fedewa won twice and finished 7th in points in 1998. After a seemingly disappointing 1998 season that saw just one victory and a fourth-place finish in points, LaJoie left for Phoenix Racing while Fedewa signed with Cicci-Welliver Racing, and sponsor Kleenex departed for Progressive Motorsports.

== Later years (1998–2005) ==
BACE had an entirely different look in 1999. Alka-Seltzer and Bayer sponsored the 33 car driven by Jason Jarrett, while the rookie Tony Raines drove the unsponsored No. 74. The results were mixed. Raines showed consistency and came out of left field to win Rookie of the Year, while Jarrett was released after the race at California Speedway, and was replaced by a series of rotating drivers including Mike Wallace, Hermie Sadler, and Benson returning to the team briefly. For 2000, Raines slid over to the No. 33, while rookie P. J. Jones signed to drive the 74 car. Raines finished second at South Boston, and finished 15th in points, while the 74 team disappeared briefly due to operating expenses, before Chad Little became the driver towards the end of the year. Raines (No. 33) and Little (No. 74) returned in 2001, and both drivers finished in the top ten in points (Raines-6th, Little-9th). Raines finished 12th in point for the 2002 season in the No. 33. Little started the season out in the unsponsored No. 74 but after the first couple of races that season, BACE decided to make the move to Winston Cup running a part-time schedule in the No. 74 Monte Carlo. After missing several races, Little left the team. Raines drove the rest of the part-time schedule in 2002 and made the move to full-time Winston Cup in 2003. Raines got a sixth-place finish at North Carolina Speedway, but was left in the dust for the Rookie of the Year running. BACE returned to the Busch Series for 2004, but this time, Raines was not their original driver until later in the year, when he replaced Damon Lusk. BACE was forced to cut back to a part-time schedule because of their decreasing finances, and put Jimmy Spencer in the car with a few races to go in the season. In 2005, BACE announced they would temporarily suspend operations but return as soon as sponsorship was found. Its equipment was sold to Kevin Harvick Incorporated, and the team has not been heard from since.

== Motorsports Results ==
=== Winston Cup Series ===
==== Car No. 73 History ====
NASCAR Winston Cup Series results
Year	Driver	No.	Make	1	2	3	4	5	6	7	8	9	10	11	12	13	14	15	16	17	18	19	20	21	22	23	24	25	26	27	28	29	30	31	32	33	34	35	36	NWCC	Pts
2002	Tony Raines	73	Chevy	DAY	CAR	LVS	ATL	DAR	BRI	TEX	MAR	TAL	CAL	RCH	CLT	DOV; 31	POC	MCH	SON	DAY	CHI	NHA	POC	IND	GLN	MCH	BRI	DAR	RCH	NHA	DOV	KAN	TAL	CLT	MAR	ATL	CAR	PHO	HOM	68th	70

==== Car No. 74 History ====
NASCAR Winston Cup Series results
Year	Driver	No.	Make	1	2	3	4	5	6	7	8	9	10	11	12	13	14	15	16	17	18	19	20	21	22	23	24	25	26	27	28	29	30	31	32	33	34	35	36	NWCC	Pts
1997	Randy LaJoie	74	Chevy	DAY	CAR	RCH	ATL	DAR	TEX; DNQ	BRI	MAR	SON	TAL	CLT	DOV	POC	MCH	CAL	DAY	NHA	POC	IND	GLN	MCH	BRI	DAR	RCH	NHA	DOV	MAR	CLT	TAL	CAR	PHO	ATL					N/A	-
2002	Chad Little	74	Chevy	DAY	CAR	LVS	ATL	DAR	BRI	TEX	MAR	TAL	CAL; DNQ	RCH	CLT; DNQ	DOV; 33	POC	MCH	SON	DAY																				45th	572
2002	Tony Raines	74	Chevy																		CHI; DNQ	NHA	POC	IND; DNQ		MCH; 43	BRI	DAR; 35	RCH	NHA	DOV; 31	KAN; 41	TAL	CLT	MAR	ATL; 29	CAR; DNQ	PHO; 43	HOM; DNQ	45th	572
2002	Joe Varde	74	Chevy																						GLN; 42															45th	572
2003	Tony Raines	74	Chevy	DAY; 33	CAR; 37	LVS; 24	ATL; 24	DAR; 41	BRI; 42	TEX; 42	TAL; 16	MAR; 33	CAL; 31	RCH; 14	CLT; 37	DOV; 31	POC; 30	MCH; 33	SON; 31	DAY; DNQ	CHI; 22	NHA; 33	POC; 16	IND; 25	GLN; 41	MCH; 24	BRI; 20	DAR; 42	RCH; 35	NHA; 33	DOV; 30	TAL; 31	KAN; 26	CLT; 25	MAR; 23	ATL; 18	PHO; 19	CAR; 6	HOM; 13	35th	2800

=== Busch Series ===
==== Car No. 7 History ====
NASCAR Busch Series results
Year	Driver	No.	Make	1	2	3	4	5	6	7	8	9	10	11	12	13	14	15	16	17	18	19	20	21	22	23	24	25	26	27	28	29	30	Owners	Pts
1996	Greg Sacks	7	Chevy	DAY	CAR	RCH	ATL	NSV	DAR	BRI	HCY	NZH	CLT	DOV	SBO	MYB	GLN	MLW	NHA	TAL	IRP	MCH	BRI	DAR	RCH	DOV	CLT	CAR	HOM; 31						
1997	Bryan Wall	7	Chevy	DAY	CAR	RCH	ATL	LVS	DAR	HCY	TEX	BRI	NSV	TAL	NHA	NZH; 25	CLT	DOV	SBO	GLN	MLW	MYB	GTY	IRP	MCH	BRI	DAR	RCH	DOV	CLT	CAL	CAR	HOM		

==== Car No. 26 History ====
NASCAR Busch Series results
Year	Driver	No.	Make	1	2	3	4	5	6	7	8	9	10	11	12	13	14	15	16	17	18	19	20	21	22	23	24	25	26	27	28	29	30	31	32	Owners	Pts
1998	Johnny Benson Jr.	26	Chevy	DAY	CAR	LVS	NSV	DAR	BRI	TEX	HCY	TAL	NHA	NZH	CLT	DOV	RCH	PPR	GLN	MLW	MYB	CAL	SBO	IRP	MCH	BRI	DAR	RCH	DOV	CLT; 17	GTY	CAR	ATL	HOM; 7		71st	146
1999	Johnny Benson Jr.	26	Chevy	DAY; 37	CAR; 14	LVS; 11	ATL; 43	DAR	TEX; 15	NSV	BRI	TAL	CAL; 38	NHA	RCH	NZH	CLT; 35	DOV	SBO	GLN	MLW	MYB	PPR	GTY	IRP	MCH	BRI	DAR	RCH	DOV	CLT	CAR	MEM	PHO	HOM	57th	562

==== Car No. 33 History ====
NASCAR Busch Series results
Year	Driver	No.	Make	1	2	3	4	5	6	7	8	9	10	11	12	13	14	15	16	17	18	19	20	21	22	23	24	25	26	27	28	29	30	31	32	33	34	NBSC	Pts
1997	Tim Fedewa	33	Chevy	DAY; 34	CAR; 10	RCH; 18	ATL; 7	LVS; 15	DAR; 14	HCY; 3	TEX; 38	BRI; 7	NSV; 3	TAL; 5	NHA; 39	NZH; 11	CLT; 35	DOV; 15	SBO; 19	GLN; 32	MLW; 10	MYB; 12	GTY; 6	IRP; 4	MCH; 25	BRI; 27	DAR; 15	RCH; 9	DOV; 14	CLT; 27	CAL; 33	CAR; 19	HOM; 10					9th	3398
1998	Tim Fedewa	33	Chevy	DAY; 20	CAR; 18	LVS; 19	NSV; 8	DAR; 34	BRI; 34	TEX; 13	HCY; 3	TAL; 27	NHA; 11	NZH; 1*	CLT; 18	DOV; 17	RCH; 15	PPR; 35	GLN; 7	MLW; 8	MYB; 6	CAL; 17	SBO; 1	IRP; 38	MCH; 32	BRI; 5	DAR; 26	RCH; 21	DOV; 15	CLT; 30	GTY; 18	CAR; 9	ATL; 27	HOM; 10				8th	3515
1999	Jason Jarrett	33	Chevy	DAY; 27	CAR; 21	LVS; 38	ATL; 23	DAR; 41	TEX; DNQ	NSV; 24	BRI; DNQ	TAL; 43	CAL; 39																									32nd	2167
1999	Johnny Benson Jr.	33	Chevy											NHA; 21	RCH; DNQ			DOV; 12												DOV; 34		CAR; 6		PHO; 14	HOM; 27			32nd	2167
1999	Brad Leighton	33	Chevy													NZH; 34				GLN; 43	MLW; 37				IRP; 36													32nd	2167
1999	Mike Wallace	33	Chevy														CLT; DNQ																					32nd	2167
1999	Curtis Markham	33	Chevy																SBO; DNQ																			32nd	2167
1999	Hermie Sadler	33	Chevy																			MYB; 31	PPR; 11	GTY; 14		MCH; 32	BRI; DNQ	DAR; DNQ	RCH; 24									32nd	2167
1999	Geoff Bodine	33	Chevy																												CLT; 17		MEM; 38					32nd	2167
2000	Tony Raines	33	Chevy	DAY; 21	CAR; 24	LVS; 16	ATL; 12	DAR; 21	BRI; 22	TEX; 15	NSV; 36	TAL; 33	CAL; 20	RCH; 15	NHA; 15	CLT; 25	DOV; 16	SBO; 2	MYB; 17	GLN; 14	MLW; 26	NZH; 12	PPR; 43	GTY; 28	IRP; 40	MCH; 35	BRI; 11	DAR; 39	RCH; 41	DOV; 24	CLT; 19	CAR; 26	MEM; 12	PHO; 18	HOM; 33			19th	3061
2001	Tony Raines	33	Chevy	DAY; 36	CAR; 38	LVS; 4	ATL; 10	DAR; 22	BRI; 8	TEX; 20	NSH; 16	TAL; 14	CAL; 8	RCH; 2	NHA; 12	NZH; 6	CLT; 24	DOV; 10	KEN; 3	MLW; 10	GLN; 27	CHI; 11	GTY; 23	PPR; 19	IRP; 12	MCH; 3	BRI; 17	DAR; 10	RCH; 21	DOV; 7	KAN; 7	CLT; 14	MEM; 31	PHO; 16	CAR; 22	HOM; 14		8th	3975
2002	Tony Raines	33	Pontiac	DAY; 34							TAL; 20																											13th	3804
2002	Tony Raines	33	Chevy		CAR; 9	LVS; 36	DAR; 7	BRI; 11	TEX; 20	NSH; 30		CAL; 25	RCH; 37	NHA; 24	NZH; 10	CLT; 21	DOV; 27	NSH; 22	KEN; 3	MLW; 5	DAY; 13	CHI; 18	GTY; 5	PPR; 35	IRP; 9	MCH; 16	BRI; 8	DAR; 9	RCH; 4	DOV; 11	KAN; 5	CLT; 11	MEM; 15	ATL; 19	CAR; 23	PHO; 28	HOM; 36	13th	3804
2003	Tony Raines	33	Chevy	DAY	CAR	LVS; 33	DAR	BRI; 2	TEX; 36	TAL	NSH	CAL; 31	RCH; 3	GTY	NZH	CLT; 36	DOV	NSH	KEN	MLW	DAY	CHI; 8	NHA	PPR	IRP	MCH	BRI; 8	DAR	RCH; 8	DOV; 22	KAN; 38	CLT	MEM	ATL	PHO; 23	CAR		39th	1339
2003	Damon Lusk	33	Chevy																																		HOM; 18	39th	1339

==== Car No. 74 History ====
NASCAR Busch Series results
Year	Driver	No.	Make	1	2	3	4	5	6	7	8	9	10	11	12	13	14	15	16	17	18	19	20	21	22	23	24	25	26	27	28	29	30	31	32	33	34	Owners	Pts
1993	Jack Sprague	74	Chevy	DAY; 44	CAR; 12	RCH; 20	DAR; 24	BRI; 21	HCY; 19	ROU; 21	MAR; 9	NZH; 12	CLT; 24	DOV; 27	MYB; 16	GLN; 21	MLW; 32	TAL; 15	IRP; 17	MCH; 9	NHA; 20	BRI; 23	DAR; 33	RCH; 13	DOV; 4													19th	2429
1993	Randy LaJoie	74	Chevy																							ROU; 4												19th	2429
1993	Johnny Benson	74	Chevy																								CLT; 30		CAR; DNQ	HCY; 19	ATL; 18							19th	2429
1993	Ernie Irvan	74	Chevy																									MAR; 9										19th	2429
1994	Johnny Benson	74	Chevy	DAY; 26	CAR; 25	RCH; 15	ATL; 16	MAR; 20	DAR; 16	HCY; 4	BRI; 30	ROU; 4	NHA; 12	NZH; 31	CLT; 22	DOV; 22	MYB; 16	GLN; 33	MLW; 3	SBO; 3	TAL; 38	HCY; 11	IRP; 11*	MCH; 38	BRI; 8	DAR; 4	RCH; 6	DOV; 1	CLT; 11	MAR; 13	CAR; 8							6th	3303
1995	Johnny Benson	74	Chevy	DAY; 10	CAR; 4	RCH; 3	ATL; 1	NSV; 6	DAR; 2	BRI; 6	HCY; 1	NHA; 5	NZH; 3	CLT; 30	DOV; 14	MYB; 9	GLN; 7	MLW; 33	TAL; 5	SBO; 16	IRP; 13*	MCH; 5	BRI; 12*	DAR; 2	RCH; 3	DOV; 9	CLT; 26	CAR; 3	HOM; 9									1st	3688
1996	Randy LaJoie	74	Chevy	DAY; 7	CAR; 7	RCH; 6	ATL; 28	NSV; 21	DAR; 12	BRI; 6	HCY; 3	NZH; 1	CLT; 5*	DOV; 1	SBO; 5*	MYB; 18	GLN; 30	MLW; 3	NHA; 1*	TAL; 3	IRP; 1*	MCH; 10	BRI; 29	DAR; 5	RCH; 8	DOV; 1	CLT; 6	CAR; 9	HOM; 10									1st	3714
1997	Randy LaJoie	74	Chevy	DAY; 1*	CAR; 3	RCH; 8	ATL; 16	LVS; 29	DAR; 1*	HCY; 2*	TEX; 9	BRI; 3	NSV; 6	TAL; 12	NHA; 7	NZH; 3	CLT; 10	DOV; 3	SBO; 1*	GLN; 21	MLW; 1	MYB; 3	GTY; 17	IRP; 1*	MCH; 17	BRI; 4	DAR; 18	RCH; 2	DOV; 2*	CLT; 15	CAL; 10	CAR; 20	HOM; 2					1st	4381
1998	Randy LaJoie	74	Chevy	DAY; 5	CAR; 7	LVS; 18	NSV; 4	DAR; 23	BRI; 25	TEX; 6	HCY; 23	TAL; 23	NHA; 5	NZH; 42	CLT; 14	DOV; 11	RCH; 11	PPR; 3	GLN; 37	MLW; 10	MYB; 1*	CAL; 16	SBO; 2	IRP; 4	MCH; 16	BRI; 31	DAR; 19	RCH; 30	DOV; 37	CLT; 29	GTY; 7	CAR; 30	ATL; 41	HOM; 9				4th	3543
1999	Tony Raines	74	Chevy	DAY; 28	CAR; 20	LVS; 28	ATL; 21	DAR; 21		NSV; 11	BRI; 39	TAL; 24	CAL; 17	NHA; 13	RCH; 17	NZH; 11	CLT; 18	DOV; 17	SBO; 9	GLN; 13	MLW; 21	MYB; 19	PPR; 25	GTY; 21	IRP; 10	MCH; 30	BRI; 30	DAR; 25	RCH; 36	DOV; 4	CLT; 25	CAR; 12	MEM; 28	PHO; 20	HOM; 28			12th	3142
1999	Steve Grissom	74	Chevy						TEX; 40																													12th	3142
2000	P. J. Jones	74	Chevy	DAY; 40	CAR; 35	LVS; 35	ATL; 24	DAR; 27	BRI; 39	TEX; 31	NSV	TAL	CAL	RCH	NHA	CLT	DOV	SBO	MYB	GLN	MLW	NZH	PPR	GTY	IRP	MCH	BRI	DAR	RCH	DOV								38th	1262
2000	Chad Little	74	Chevy																												CLT; DNQ	CAR; 32	MEM	PHO	HOM; DNQ			38th	1262
2001	Chad Little	74	Chevy	DAY; 9	CAR; 15	LVS; 16	ATL; 15	DAR; 24	BRI; 12	TEX; 31	NSH; 27	TAL; 11	CAL; 18	RCH; 20	NHA; 14	NZH; 20	CLT; 21	DOV; 11	KEN; 6	MLW; 20	GLN; 16	CHI; 17	GTY; 13	PPR; 16	IRP; 3	MCH; 16	BRI; 9	DAR; 13	RCH; 6	DOV; 4	KAN; 36	CLT; 17	MEM; 16	PHO; 13	CAR; 17	HOM; 27		9th	3846
2002	Chad Little	74	Chevy	DAY; 14	CAR; 24	LVS; 21	DAR	BRI	TEX	NSH	TAL	CAL	RCH	NHA	NZH	CLT	DOV	NSH	KEN	MLW	DAY	CHI	GTY	PPR	IRP	MCH	BRI	DAR	RCH	DOV	KAN	CLT	MEM	ATL	CAR	PHO	HOM	69th	312
2003	Kerry Earnhardt	74	Chevy	DAY	CAR	LVS	DAR	BRI	TEX	TAL	NSH	CAL	RCH	GTY	NZH	CLT	DOV	NSH	KEN	MLW	DAY	CHI	NHA	PPR	IRP	MCH	BRI	DAR	RCH	DOV	KAN	CLT	MEM	ATL	PHO	CAR; 23	HOM	119th	0
2004	Damon Lusk	74	Chevy	DAY; 21	CAR; 24	LVS; DNQ	DAR; 25																															33rd	1553
2004	Tony Raines	74	Chevy					BRI; 6	TEX; 43	NSH; 15	TAL; 26	CAL	GTY	RCH; 16	NZH	CLT; 12	DOV; 12	NSH; 41	KEN; 15	KEN	MLW	CHI; 20	NHA	PPR; 16		MCH; 35	BRI; 29	CAL; 19	RCH	DOV; 36	KAN							33rd	1553
2004	Tyler Walker	74	Chevy																						IRP; 30													33rd	1553
2004	Jimmy Spencer	74	Chevy																													CLT; 22	MEM	ATL	PHO; 39	DAR	HOM; 28	33rd	1553
