= Johnny Miller (racing driver) =

American racing driver

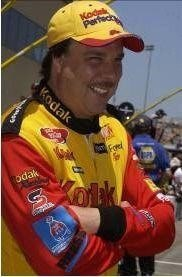
- Born: December 25, 1965 (age 60); Johnson City, Tennessee, U.S.

NASCAR Cup Series career
- 3 races run over 2 years
- 2005 position: 75th
- Best finish: 59th (2003)
- First race: 2003 Dodge/Save Mart 350 (Sears Point)
- Last race: 2005 Sirius Satellite Radio at the Glen (Watkins Glen)
Wins	Top tens	Poles
0	0	0
- Statistics up to date as of April 10, 2017.

Johnny Miller (born December 25, 1965) is an American racing driver.

Miller has one-hundred career starts in the Trans-Am road racing series, including two wins and 67 top-ten finishes. Miller finished in the top-ten in Trans-Am points from 1998 to 2004 with career victories in 2000–2004.

Miller is also considered a road course ringer in the NASCAR Nextel Cup Series. Miller has raced for Morgan-McClure Motorsports and Front Row Motorsports, for a total of three races.

== Motorsports career results ==
=== NASCAR ===
(key) (Bold – Pole position awarded by qualifying time. Italics – Pole position earned by points standings or practice time. * – Most laps led.)

==== Nextel Cup Series ====
NASCAR Nextel Cup Series results
Year	Team	No.	Make	1	2	3	4	5	6	7	8	9	10	11	12	13	14	15	16	17	18	19	20	21	22	23	24	25	26	27	28	29	30	31	32	33	34	35	36	NNCC	Pts	Ref
2003	Morgan-McClure Motorsports	4	Pontiac	DAY	CAR	LVS	ATL	DAR	BRI	TEX	TAL	MAR	CAL	RCH	CLT	DOV	POC	MCH	SON; 24	DAY	CHI	NHA	POC	IND																59th	146	
2003	Morgan-McClure Motorsports	04	Pontiac																						GLN; 36	MCH	BRI	DAR	RCH	NHA	DOV	TAL	KAN	CLT	MAR	ATL	PHO	CAR	HOM	59th	146	
2005	Front Row Motorsports	92	Chevy	DAY	CAL	LVS	ATL	BRI	MAR	TEX	PHO	TAL	DAR	RCH	CLT	DOV	POC	MCH	SON	DAY	CHI	NHA	POC	IND	GLN; 29	MCH	BRI	CAL	RCH	NHA	DOV	TAL	KAN	CLT	MAR	ATL	TEX	PHO	HOM	75th	76	
2006	Front Row Motorsports	34	Chevy	DAY	CAL	LVS	ATL	BRI	MAR	TEX	PHO	TAL	RCH	DAR	CLT	DOV	POC	MCH	SON; DNQ	DAY	CHI	NHA	POC	IND																NA	-	
2006	Front Row Motorsports	92	Chevy																						GLN; DNQ	MCH	BRI	CAL	RCH	NHA	DOV	KAN	TAL	CLT	MAR	ATL	TEX	PHO	HOM	NA	-	
