= Dale Earnhardt, Inc. =

Museum and former NASCAR team

- Owner: Teresa Earnhardt
- Base: Mooresville, North Carolina
- Series: Sprint Cup Series, Nationwide Series, Craftsman Truck Series
- Race drivers: Dale Earnhardt Jr., Michael Waltrip, Steve Park, Darrell Waltrip, Robby Gordon, Mark Martin, Kenny Wallace, Paul Menard, Martin Truex Jr., Regan Smith, Aric Almirola, Kerry Earnhardt
- Manufacturer: Chevrolet
- Opened: 1980
- Closed: 2009

Career
- Debut: Cup Series: 1996 UAW-GM Teamwork 500 (Pocono); Nationwide Series: 1984 Mello Yello 300 (Charlotte); Truck Series: 1995 Skoal Bandit Copper World Classic (Phoenix)
- Latest race: Cup Series: 2008 Ford 400 (Homestead); Nationwide Series: 2008 Winn-Dixie 250 (Daytona); Truck Series: 1999 NAPA Auto Parts 200 (Fontana)
- Races competed: Total: 1,525; Cup Series: 972; Xfinity Series: 427; Truck Series: 126
- Drivers' Championships: Total: 4 Cup Series: 0 Xfinity Series: 2 (1998, 1999); Truck Series: 2 (1996, 1998)
- Race victories: Total: 95; Cup Series: 24; Xfinity Series: 41; Truck Series: 25
- Pole positions: Total: 43; Cup Series: 14; Xfinity Series: 18; Truck Series: 11

Dale Earnhardt, Inc. (DEI) is a museum in Mooresville, North Carolina. Formerly a race team founded by Dale Earnhardt and his wife, Teresa Earnhardt, it competed in the NASCAR Cup Series, the highest level of competition for professional stock car racing in the United States, from 1998 to 2009. Earnhardt was a seven-time Winston Cup champion who died in a crash on the final lap of the 2001 Daytona 500. Despite his ownership of the DEI racing team, Earnhardt never drove for his team in the Winston Cup; instead, he raced for his long-time mentor and backer Richard Childress at RCR. In the late-2000s, DEI suffered critical financial difficulties after drivers Dale Earnhardt Jr. and Michael Waltrip, and sponsors Anheuser-Busch, National Automotive Parts Association and United States Army left the team; DEI consequently merged with Chip Ganassi Racing in 2009, moving their equipment into the latter's shop, while the former's closed down.

DEI celebrated the life and legacy of Earnhardt through an annual celebration of his birthday on April 29, also known as Dale Earnhardt Day. DEI maintains a showroom at the former race shop in Mooresville where fans can purchase memorabilia and other goods. The organization also pursues partnerships which bring tribute to Earnhardt's memory. Notable drivers for DEI included Dale Earnhardt Jr., Michael Waltrip, Steve Park, Martin Truex Jr., Mark Martin, John Andretti, Kenny Wallace, Darrell Waltrip, and Aric Almirola.

== History ==
=== Mergers ===
==== Ginn Racing ====
On July 25, 2007, DEI merged with Ginn Racing, formerly known as MB2 Motorsports. The No. 01 team joined the No. 1, No. 8 and No. 15 teams. The merger did not affect the DEI team name.

==== Chip Ganassi Racing ====
On November 12, 2008, DEI and Felix Sabates' Chip Ganassi Racing (the latter at the time a Dodge team) merged their NASCAR operations into one organization. The team was rechristened Earnhardt Ganassi Racing and moved all team operations to CGR's shop, effectively switching the latter to Chevrolets. The No. 42 team joined the No. 1 and No. 8 for the 2009 Sprint Cup season. In 2014, EGR reverted to the Chip Ganassi Racing name before being sold to Trackhouse Racing Team in 2021.

=== Earnhardt Technology Group ===
Earnhardt Technology Group (ETG) was created in August 2009 to assist up-and-coming teams. It was founded to contribute resources and opportunities to race in championships. It serves the engineering and parts needs of more than thirty teams in the NASCAR Sprint Cup, the NASCAR Nationwide Series and the Camping World Truck Series. ETG provides a broad range of engineering services to all levels of the racing industry; distribution of Renton springs; machine shop services (now contributing to many varied fields of mechanical engineering); a leasing service; sales of vehicles and component parts; and consultation and support.

=== Club E ===
Club E is the official fan club for Dale Earnhardt. It is a membership based fan club with three different levels based on contribution level (ranging from no fee to $49.99). Members of Club E have access to Dale Earnhardt footage, personal items, discounts at the DEI retail store, Carowinds, Kings Dominion, the NASCAR Hall of Fame, Kannapolis Intimidators games, Charlotte Motor Speedway, Dale Earnhardt Chevrolet, and Great Wolf Lodge, Inc. as well as member only events. Club E is currently suspended but does offer a Facebook page for fans to follow to receive news.

=== The Dale Earnhardt Foundation ===
The Dale Earnhardt Foundation was founded with a mission to continue the legacy of Dale Earnhardt through charitable programs and grants reflecting Earnhardt's commitments to children, education and environment and wildlife preservation.

== Cup Series ==
=== Car No. 01 History ===
Mark Martin (2007)

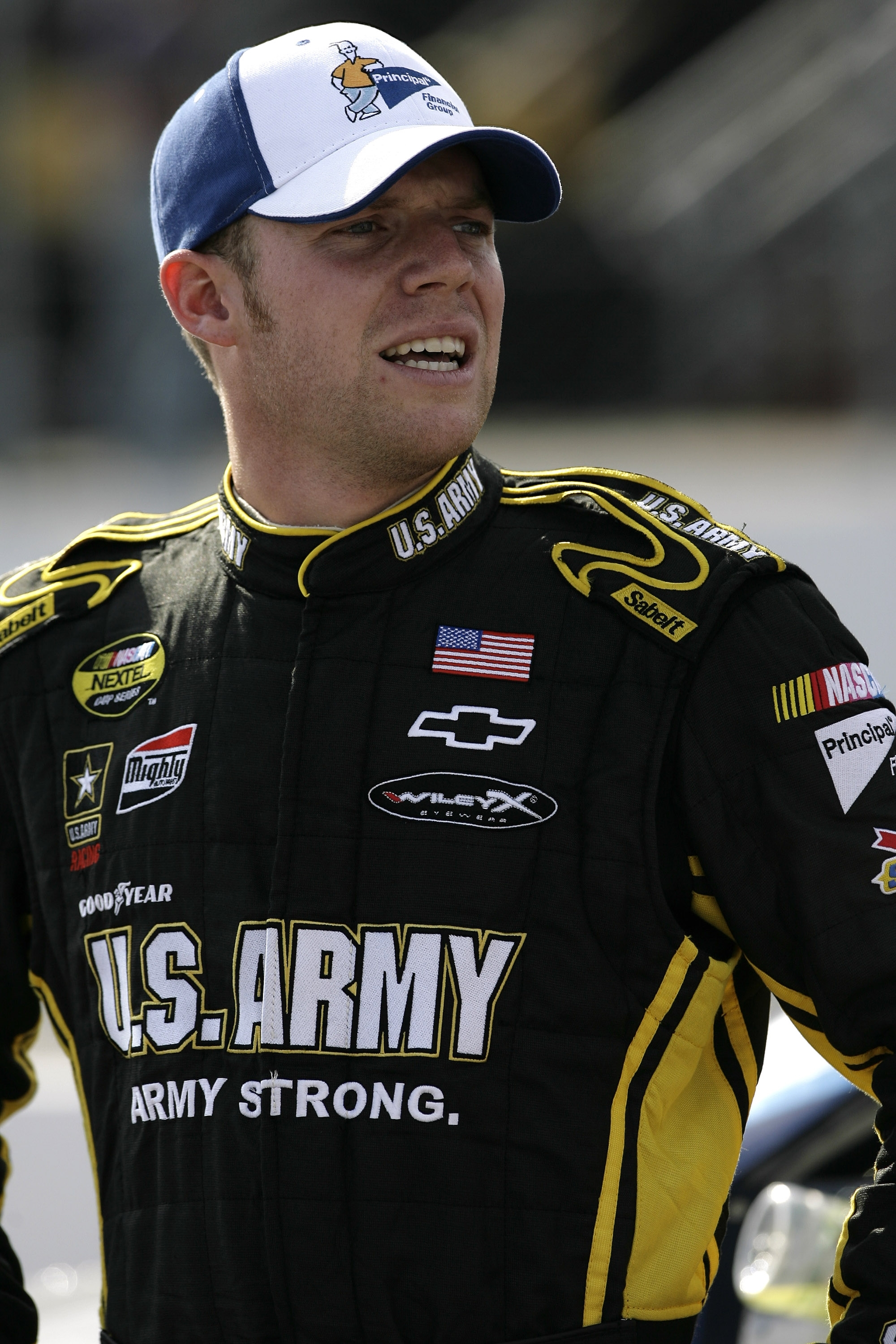
Regan Smith drove the 01 part-time in 2007, then drove the 01 for DEI in 34 of 36 races in 2008, winning Rookie of the Year.

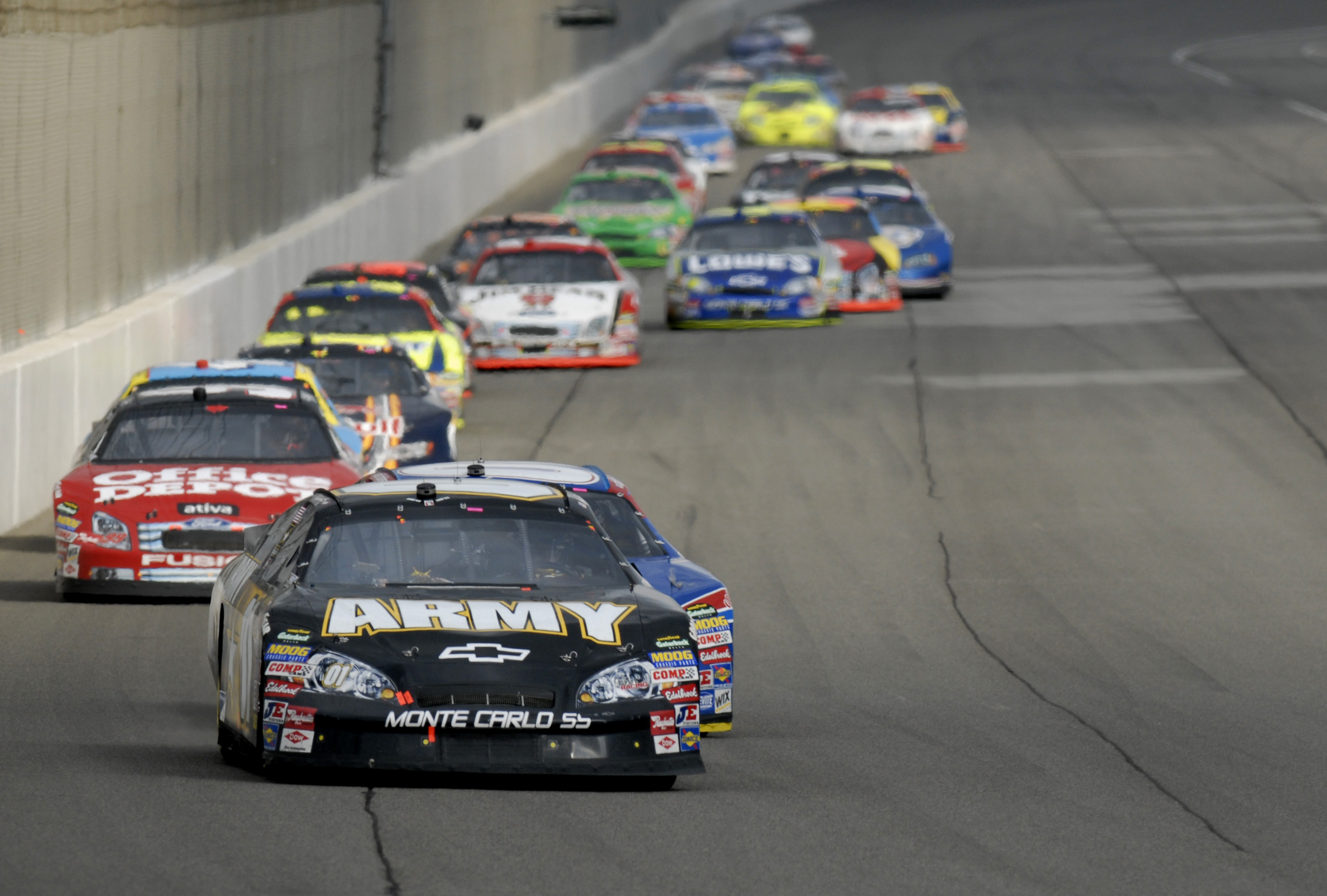
Mark Martin in the 2007 Auto Club 500 at California.

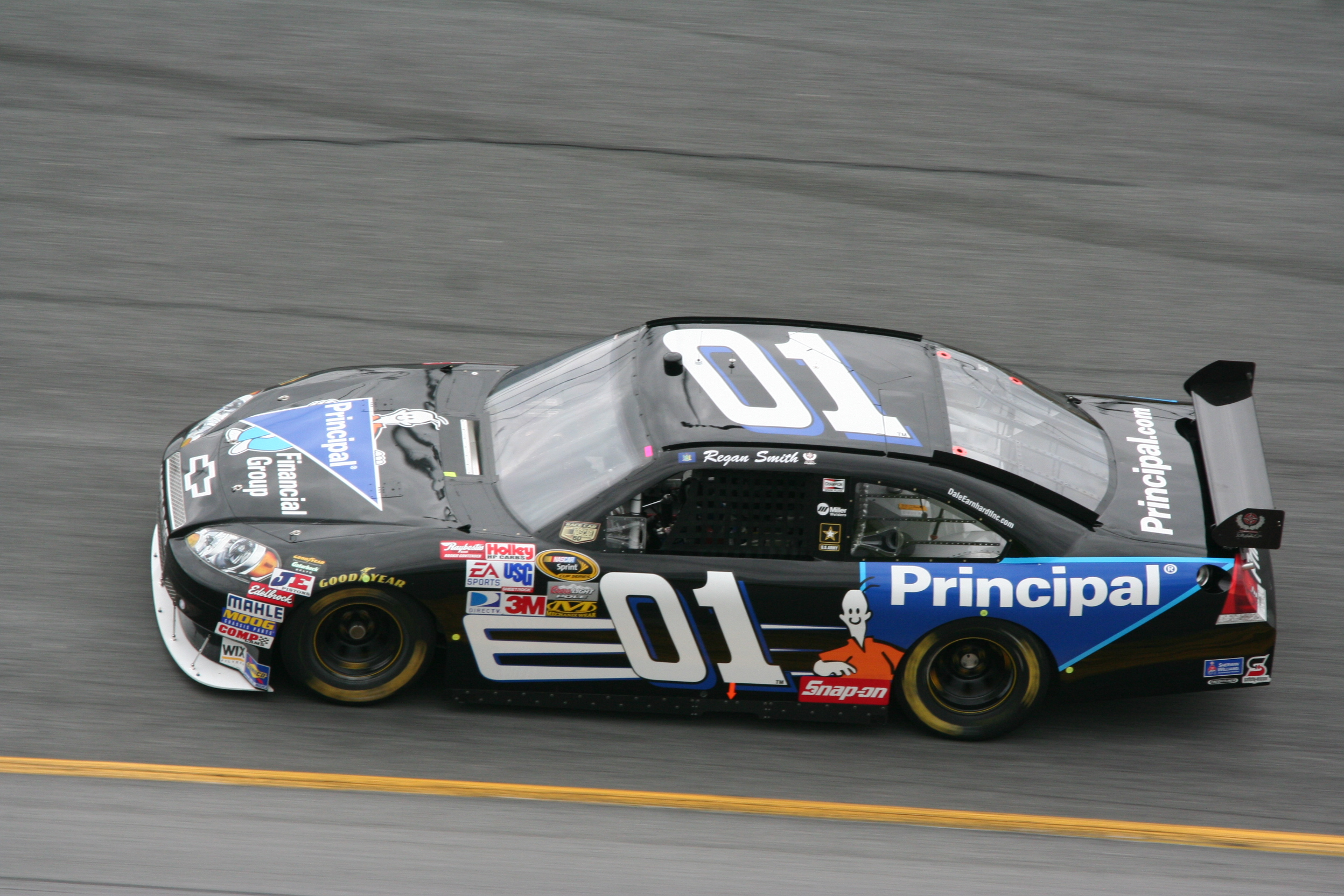
Regan Smith's car from 2008

Before the 01 car ran under the DEI banner, the team ran as MB2 Motorsports, with their cars driven by drivers such as Ernie Irvan, Ken Schrader, and Joe Nemechek. Veteran Mark Martin, coming off his final year with Roush Racing, was signed to drive MB2's No. 01 car for 20 races (18 points races plus the Budweiser Shootout and Nextel All-Star Challenge) in 2007, with Joe Nemechek moving over from the 01 team to the team's new 13 team. Regan Smith was pinned to fill the remaining 18 races of the season, while driving in the Busch Series for the team as well. MB2 Motorsports also changed its name to Ginn Racing to reflect Bobby Ginn's new majority interest in the team. Martin was leading in the final turn of the season-opening Daytona 500, after lining up on the final restart with former Roush teammates Greg Biffle and Matt Kenseth behind him. Coming down the front stretch, and with the field wrecking behind him, Martin looked to have finally come through at Daytona. But the caution was not called, and Kevin Harvick caught Martin on his outside, beating him to the line by two-hundredths of a second. Martin put together more strong finishes, and after the fourth race at Atlanta was leading the points standings in what was supposed to be his first season of semi-retirement. Resisting the chance to capture his first championship, Martin did step out of the car as scheduled, breaking a streak of 621 consecutive starts. In 24 starts for the team, Martin scored 11 top 10s, and finished 27th in points despite missing 12 races.

Regan Smith (2007-2008)

Rookie Regan Smith meanwhile made his debut at Bristol Motor Speedway in March, finishing 25th. Smith would run 6 more races in the car, with a best finish of 24th at Talladega Superspeedway. On July 17, it was announced that Smith would move to the 14 car on a full-time basis, replacing veteran Sterling Marlin. Meanwhile, 23-year-old Aric Almirola, who was granted his release from Joe Gibbs Racing after being pulled out of a car he qualified on the pole during a Busch Series race in favor of Denny Hamlin, signed on to be the new co-driver of the 01. With the merger of Ginn and DEI not long afterwards, Smith was left on the sidelines while Almirola ran 5 races. Aric's results were not much better than Regan's, with a best finish of 26th at Phoenix. Martin and Almirola would move to the 8 car for 2008.

In 2008, Smith was named the full-time driver of the 01 car (now fully operated by DEI), with Martin and Almirola as well as sponsor U.S. Army moving to the 8 car to replace the departing Dale Earnhardt Jr. Principal Financial Group was signed as the primary sponsor for the Daytona 500 and Brickyard 400. Principal often ran as a secondary sponsor on the sides of the car, with a DEI logo on the hood in lieu of full sponsorship. Steak-umm and Coors Light were also sponsors in one-race deals. Ron Fellows replaced Smith at the two road course races, scoring a 13th-place finish at Watkins Glen. Smith almost won the 2008 AMP Energy 500, passing Tony Stewart on the final lap and crossing the finish line in first. Smith, however, was found to be passing below the yellow line upon video review, and per NASCAR had his position revoked, leading to an 18th-place finish. Though he finished 34th in points with no top 10 finishes, Smith became the first rookie to finish every race he entered during the 2008 season and was named Rookie of the Year at the season's end. The 01 team disbanded after DEI merged with Chip Ganassi Racing with Felix Sabates, and Smith moved on to Furniture Row Racing.

==== Car No. 01 Results ====
NASCAR Sprint Cup Series results
Year	Driver	No.	Manufacturer	1	2	3	4	5	6	7	8	9	10	11	12	13	14	15	16	17	18	19	20	21	22	23	24	25	26	27	28	29	30	31	32	33	34	35	36	Owners	Pts
2007	Mark Martin	01	Chevy	DAY; 2	CAL; 5	LVS; 5	ATL; 10			TEX; 3	PHO; 12		RCH; 17	DAR; 14	CLT; 11	DOV; 7	POC; 7	MCH; 29			DAY; 17	CHI; 14	IND; 6	POC; 9		MCH; 42			RCH; 21		DOV; 4	KAN; 12		CLT; 16		ATL; 43	TEX; 34		HOM; 9	17th	3793
2007	Regan Smith	01	Chevy					BRI; 25	MAR; 26			TAL; 24							SON; 30	NHA; 32					GLN; 37					NHA; 36										17th	3793
2007	Aric Almirola	01	Chevy																								BRI; 36	CAL; 31					TAL; 30		MAR; 43			PHO; 26		17th	3793
2008	Regan Smith	01	Chevy	DAY; 37	CAL; 31	LVS; 34	ATL; 38	BRI; 26	MAR; 14	TEX; 35	PHO; 35	TAL; 21	RCH; 21	DAR; 29	CLT; 19	DOV; 21	POC; 28	MCH; 32		NHA; 27	DAY; 24	CHI; 34	IND; 31	POC; 25		MCH; 29	BRI; 14	CAL; 26	RCH; 23	NHA; 23	DOV; 37	KAN; 32	TAL; 18	CLT; 23	MAR; 42	ATL; 30	TEX; 34	PHO; 23	HOM; 34	32nd	2872
2008	Ron Fellows	01	Chevy																SON; 29						GLN; 13															32nd	2872

=== Car No. 1 history ===
No. 14 (1996-1997)

In 1996, DEI debuted in the Winston Cup Series for the first of two appearances at Pocono Raceway with the No. 14 Racing for Kids Chevrolet driven by Jeff Green. Robby Gordon also drove the car in an appearance for DEI at Charlotte Motor Speedway later in the season. In 1997, sponsored by Burger King, Busch Series standout Steve Park drove the car in four races, with the team failing to qualify in another four.

Steve Park (1997-2003)

In 1998, the team switched the car number from No. 14 to No. 1 in an agreement with Richard Jackson $100,000, another car owner. DEI received sponsorships from Pennzoil and Park and made a bid for NASCAR Rookie of the Year honors. In the third race of the year at Las Vegas Motor Speedway, Park failed to qualify. The following week, Steve suffered a broken femur, collarbone, and shoulder blade in a severe crash during practice at Atlanta. Ron Hornaday Jr. failed to qualify the car in the following weekend at Darlington before the team brought in 3-time champion Darrell Waltrip. He drove the car for 13 races while Park recovered from his injuries and finished in the Top 10 twice. Park returned at the Brickyard 400 and following a crash, he finished 35th. In 1998, Park posted two 11th-place finishes and finished 42nd in points.

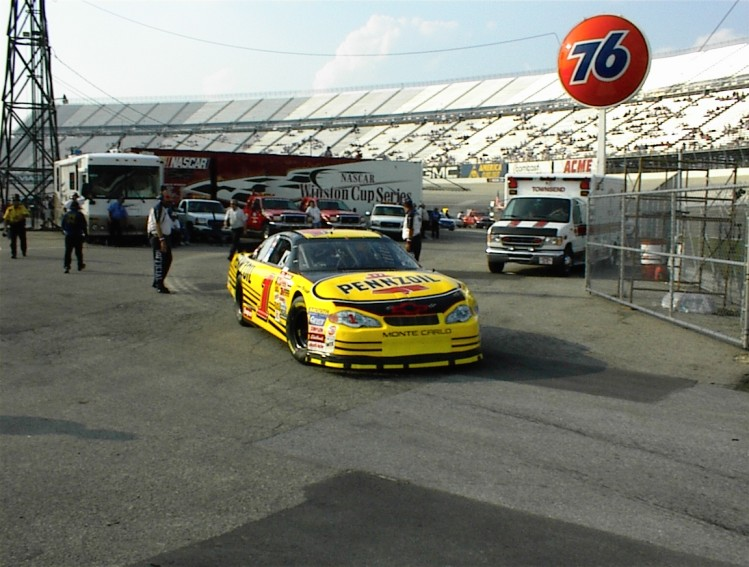
2001 Cup car at Dover being driven by Kenny Wallace (injury replacement for Steve Park)

In 1999, Park finished in the Top 10 five times and 14th in points. In 2000, he won his first two Bud Pole awards and won his first race at Watkins Glen International, his home track. He finished the season 11th in points. In 2001, in the first race after Earnhardt's death, he beat Bobby Labonte in a photo finish at North Carolina Speedway. Park's career encountered difficulties at a Busch Series race at Darlington Raceway. During a caution, his steering wheel became disconnected from the column. The car immediately veered to the left and was hit by the quicker-moving vehicle of Larry Foyt. Kenny Wallace filled in for Park while he recuperated from the new injuries sustained at Darlington. In doing so, Wallace won the pole and finished second in the Pop Secret Microwave Popcorn 400 at the North Carolina speedway. Park gradually recovered from his injuries and returned, ironically, at the 2002 spring Darlington race. Park ran strong in his return, taking the lead at lap 18, and proceeding to lead 19 laps. Park, however, crashed while attempting to pass the lapped car of Stacy Compton, pole sitter Ricky Craven, was also collected during the incident. Park would finish 39th, 160 laps down. This was eventually seen as a sign that Park was still likely suffering from a concussion sustained during the Darlington crash the previous year and exacerbated by further impacts since. Park struggled to regain his form and was involved in yet another visually stunning accident during the opening lap of a race at Pocono. Rusty Wallace collided with Park exiting turn 1. The No. 1 then turned dead left and dragged teammate Dale Earnhardt Jr.'s No. 8 car through wet grass towards the short and relatively unreinforced inside guardrail (prior to SAFER Barriers). Park hit the metal guard rail, and proceeded to flip several times, eventually landing on the driver's side. Park's teammate ran to his aide after the dramatic impact and aftermath. In mid 2003, Park was relieved of his driving duties and was replaced by Jeff Green. (Park took over Green's No. 30 AOL Chevy at Richard Childress Racing, previously Earnhardt's car owner)

In a last-second decision in June 2003, Ty Norris suggested a former student of Earnhardt's, Ron Fellows, to drive the No. 1 for the road course events as a road course ringer. In 2001 Fellows was finalizing a deal to drive a Dale Earnhardt Inc. car full-time in 2002 but Earnhardt's death left this invalid. Using advantage of this rare opportunity, Fellows almost won the 2003 Dodge Save/Mart 350 in which he controlled the race late in the event and lost when he waited too long for his final pit stop.

Part time (2004-2005)

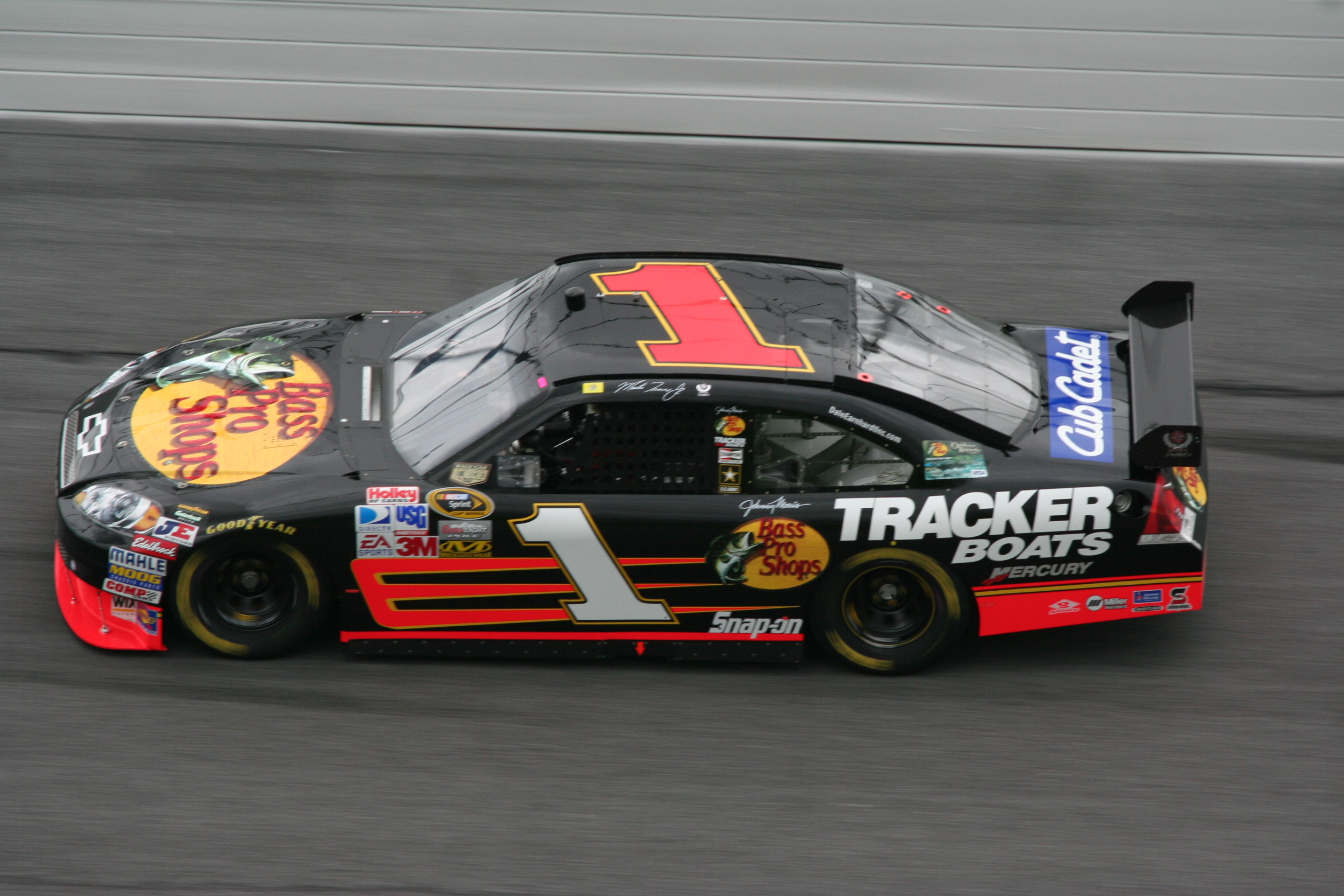
2008 Cup car at Daytona driven by Martin Truex Jr.

Both Green and Pennzoil left DEI when the 2003 season finished and the team moved to a part-time status with Pete Rondeau as the crew chief. They occasionally fielded cars for John Andretti, a two-time winner. Ron Fellows returned to the No. 1 for the 2004 Watkins Glen race bringing sponsorship of Nilla Wafers and Nutter Butter with him. During the race, Ron qualified 43rd after qualifying was cancelled due to rain. Despite this, Ron put up an amazing drive through the field in which he charged from 43rd place to finish second behind winner Tony Stewart.

Martin Truex Jr. (2005-2009)

In the 2005 NASCAR Nextel Cup Series, DEI ran a part-time schedule with Martin Truex Jr. making seven starts in the No. 1 Bass Pro Shops Chevrolet. The team returned to full-time status in 2006, collecting five Top 10's and finishing 19th in points. On June 4, 2007, Truex scored his first career NEXTEL Cup victory in the No. 1 car at the Dover International Speedway in a COT race. Truex also qualified to race in the Chase for the Nextel Cup that year. He was DEI's only representative in the 2007 Chase for the Cup and his qualification is, to date, the last for a driver in a DEI car. At the end of 2009, Truex left the team for Michael Waltrip Racing to drive the No. 56 NAPA Auto Parts-sponsored Toyota Camry.

==== Car No. 1 Results ====
NASCAR Sprint Cup Series results
Year	Driver	No.	Manufacturer	1	2	3	4	5	6	7	8	9	10	11	12	13	14	15	16	17	18	19	20	21	22	23	24	25	26	27	28	29	30	31	32	33	34	35	36	Owners	Pts
1996	Robby Gordon	14	Chevy	DAY	CAR	RCH	ATL	DAR	BRI	NWS	MAR	TAL	SON	CLT	DOV	POC; 36	MCH	DAY	NHA	POC; 41	TAL	IND	GLN								CLT; 38	CAR	PHO	ATL						47th	147
1996	Ron Hornaday Jr.	14	Chevy																					MCH; DNQ	BRI	DAR	RCH	DOV	MAR	NWS										47th	147
1997	Steve Park	14	Chevy	DAY	CAR	RCH	ATL	DAR	TEX	BRI	MAR	SON	TAL	CLT	DOV	POC	MCH	CAL	DAY	NHA	POC; DNQ	IND	GLN; 33	MCH	BRI	DAR	RCH	NHA; DNQ	DOV; DNQ	MAR	CLT; DNQ	TAL	CAR; 33	PHO; 41	ATL; 15					48th	294
1998	Steve Park	1	Chevy	DAY; 41	CAR; 31	LVS; DNQ																IND; 35	GLN; 18	MCH; 11	BRI; 34	NHA; 41	DAR; 24	RCH; 27	DOV; 11	MAR; 24	CLT; 36	TAL; 41	DAY; 33	PHO; 24	CAR; 35	ATL; 17				26th	2857
1998	Phil Parsons	1	Chevy				ATL; DNQ																																	26th	2857
1998	Ron Hornaday Jr.	1	Chevy					DAR; DNQ																																26th	2857
1998	Darrell Waltrip	1	Chevy						BRI; 23	TEX; 36	MAR; 40	TAL; 15	CAL; 5	CLT; 17	DOV; 20	RCH; 32	MCH; 12	POC; 6	SON; 13	NHA; 13	POC; 13																			26th	2857
1999	Steve Park	1	Chevy	DAY; 34	CAR; 26	LVS; 16	ATL; 32	DAR; 12	TEX; 32	BRI; 23	MAR; 25	TAL; 37	CAL; 24	RCH; 34	CLT; 42	DOV; 16	MCH; 6	POC; 13	SON; 42	DAY; 42	NHA; 12	POC; 8	IND; 15	GLN; 12	MCH; 20	BRI; 31	DAR; 10	RCH; 16	NHA; 15	DOV; 9	MAR; 12	CLT; 10	TAL; 14	CAR; 15	PHO; 15	HOM; 19	ATL; 12			14th	3481
2000	Steve Park	1	Chevy	DAY; 31	CAR; 9	LVS; 43	ATL; 4	DAR; 39	BRI; 7	TEX; 19	MAR; 25	TAL; 32	CAL; 16	RCH; 11	CLT; 9	DOV; 19	MCH; 29	POC; 15	SON; 17	DAY; 33	NHA; 28	POC; 15	IND; 16	GLN; 1*	MCH; 33	BRI; 5	DAR; 10	RCH; 4	NHA; 34	DOV; 4	MAR; 11	CLT; 7	TAL; 19	CAR; 6	PHO; 3	HOM; 8	ATL; 18			11th	3934
2001	Steve Park	1	Chevy	DAY; 31	CAR; 1	LVS; 7	ATL; 43	DAR; 2*	BRI; 9	TEX; 2	MAR; 19	TAL; 31	CAL; 15	RCH; 4	CLT; 22	DOV; 2	MCH; 23	POC; 32	SON; 40	DAY; 20	CHI; 41	NHA; 6	POC; 13	IND; 7*	GLN; 10	MCH; 9	BRI; 7													16th	3782
2001	Kenny Wallace	1	Chevy																									DAR; 41	RCH; 21	DOV; 22	KAN; 17	CLT; 23	MAR; 20	TAL; 6	PHO; 11	CAR; 2	HOM; 14	ATL; 28	NHA; 25	16th	3782
2002	Kenny Wallace	1	Chevy	DAY; 30	CAR; 10	LVS; 27	ATL; 22																																	30th	2912
2002	Steve Park	1	Chevy					DAR; 39	BRI; 24	TEX; 20	MAR; 24	TAL; 34	CAL; 22	RCH; 34	CLT; 38	DOV; 39	POC; 23	MCH; 32	SON; 23	DAY; 34	CHI; 27	NHA; 32	POC; 43	IND; 7	GLN; 39	MCH; 41	BRI; 26	DAR; 36	RCH; 11	NHA; 29	DOV; 26	KAN; 30	TAL; 6	CLT; 15	MAR; 16	ATL; 15	CAR; 24	PHO; 21	HOM; 17	30th	2912
2003	Steve Park	1	Chevy	DAY; 29	CAR; 21	LVS; 10	ATL; 16	DAR; 20	BRI; 30	TEX; 39	TAL; 20	MAR; 24	CAL; 40	RCH; 43																										31st	2935
2003	Jeff Green	1	Chevy												CLT; 19	DOV; 25	POC; 33	MCH; 28		DAY; 29	CHI; 16	NHA; 30	POC; 31	IND; 20		MCH; 21	BRI; 40	DAR; 18												31st	2935
2003	Ron Fellows	1	Chevy																SON; 7						GLN; 38															31st	2935
2003	John Andretti	1	Chevy																										RCH; 14	NHA; 12	DOV; 34		KAN; 19	CLT; 30	MAR; 31	ATL; 22	PHO; 16	CAR; 30	HOM; 42	31st	2935
2003	Jason Keller	1	Chevy																													TAL; 26								31st	2935
2004	John Andretti	1	Chevy	DAY; 13	CAR; 29	LVS	ATL	DAR	BRI	TEX	MAR	TAL	CAL	RCH	CLT; 19	DOV	POC	MCH	SON	DAY; 43	CHI; 16	NHA	POC	IND																44th	844
2004	Ron Fellows	1	Chevy																						GLN; 2	MCH	BRI	CAL	RCH											44th	844
2004	Martin Truex Jr.	1	Chevy																											NHA; DNQ	DOV					ATL; 37	PHO	DAR	HOM; 32	44th	844
2004	Kenny Wallace	1	Chevy																													TAL; 32	KAN	CLT	MAR					44th	844
2005	Martin Truex Jr.	1	Chevy	DAY; 34	CAL	LVS	ATL	BRI	MAR	TEX	PHO	TAL; 21	DAR	RCH	CLT; 7	DOV	POC	MCH	SON	DAY	CHI	NHA	POC	IND; 42								TAL; 28	KAN	CLT	MAR	ATL; 40	TEX; 15	PHO	HOM	48th	614
2005	Paul Menard	1	Chevy																						GLN; 27	MCH	BRI	CAL	RCH	NHA	DOV									48th	614
2006	Martin Truex Jr.	1	Chevy	DAY; 16	CAL; 15	LVS; 20	ATL; 19	BRI; 38	MAR; 19	TEX; 8	PHO; 22	TAL; 36	RCH; 41	DAR; 14	CLT; 21	DOV; 22	POC; 24	MCH; 15	SON; 16	DAY; 29	CHI; 19	NHA; 18	POC; 10	IND; 19	GLN; 28	MCH; 30	BRI; 18	CAL; 18	RCH; 40	NHA; 22	DOV; 6	KAN; 11	TAL; 5	CLT; 31	MAR; 36	ATL; 37	TEX; 14	PHO; 12	HOM; 2	19th	3673
2007	Martin Truex Jr.	1	Chevy	DAY; 29	CAL; 42	LVS; 12	ATL; 8	BRI; 37	MAR; 29	TEX; 7	PHO; 20	TAL; 10	RCH; 28	DAR; 11	CLT; 16	DOV; 1*	POC; 3	MCH; 2	SON; 24	NHA; 3	DAY; 13	CHI; 39	IND; 12	POC; 22	GLN; 6	MCH; 2	BRI; 11	CAL; 6	RCH; 15	NHA; 5	DOV; 13	KAN; 38	TAL; 42	CLT; 17	MAR; 19	ATL; 31*	TEX; 3	PHO; 7	HOM; 6	11th	6164
2008	Martin Truex Jr.	1	Chevy	DAY; 20	CAL; 6	LVS; 15	ATL; 21	BRI; 13	MAR; 21	TEX; 36	PHO; 8	TAL; 37	RCH; 5	DAR; 14	CLT; 34	DOV; 6	POC; 17	MCH; 17	SON; 16	NHA; 4	DAY; 17	CHI; 9	IND; 24	POC; 15	GLN; 5	MCH; 16	BRI; 35	CAL; 19	RCH; 16	NHA; 7	DOV; 20	KAN; 43	TAL; 41	CLT; 14	MAR; 10	ATL; 15	TEX; 8	PHO; 43	HOM; 10	15th	3839

=== Car No. 8 History ===
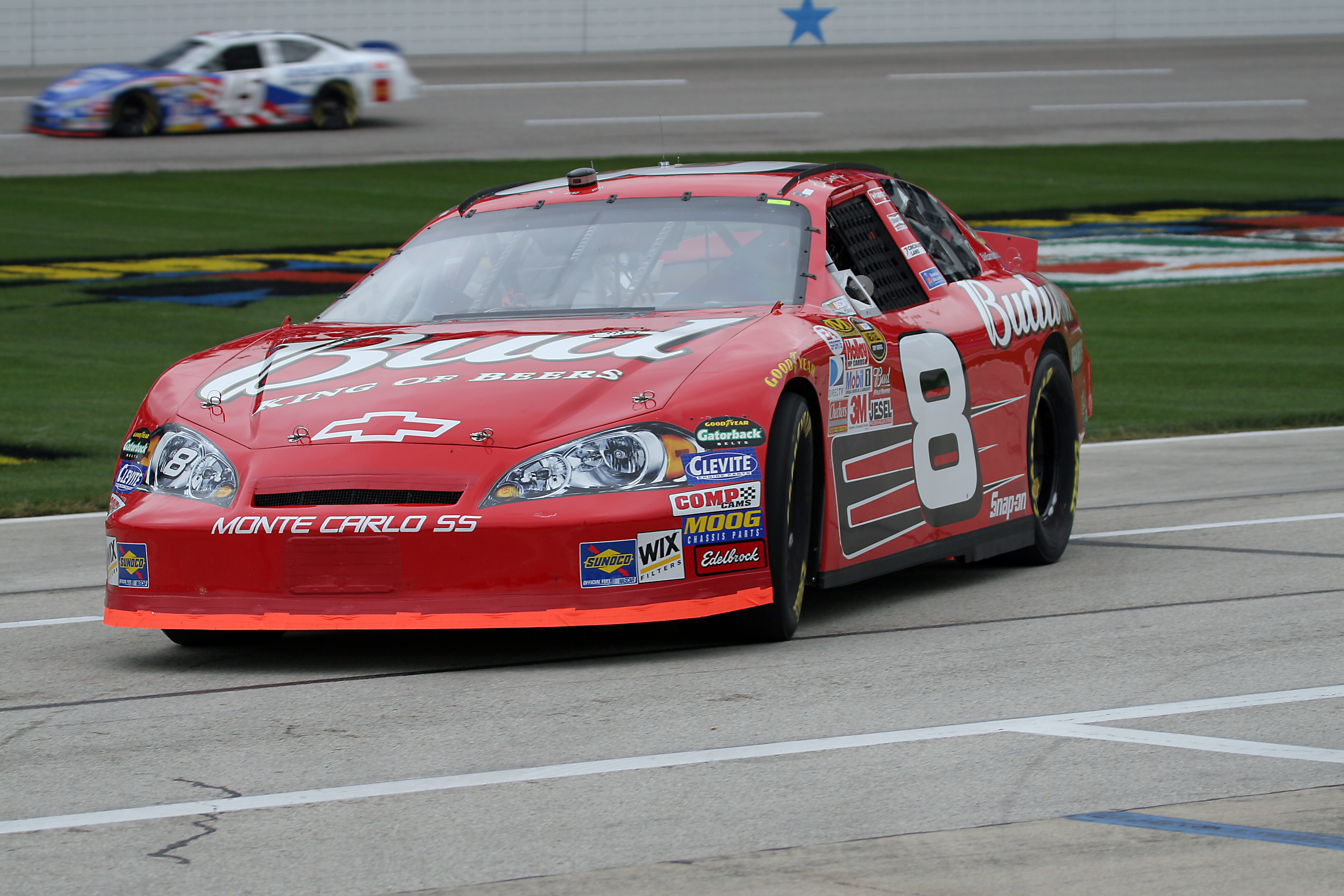
Dale Earnhardt Jr.'s car from 1999 to 2007

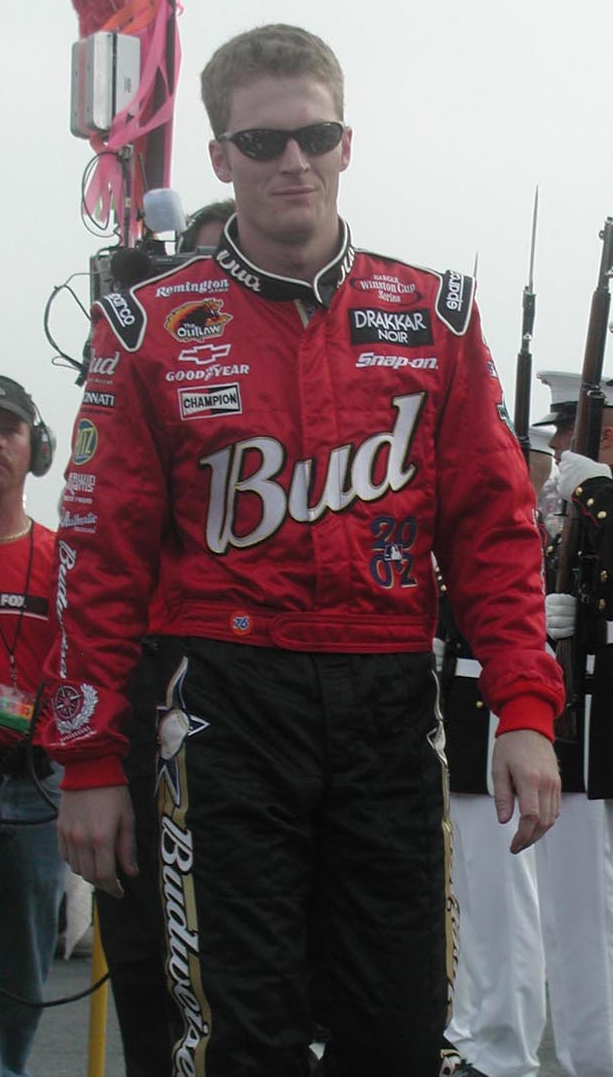
Dale Earnhardt Jr. in the 8 part-time in 1999, Full-time from 2000 to 2007.

Dale Earnhardt Jr. (1999-2007)

The No. 8 car was DEI's second cup series entry, the team was formed to bring Dale Earnhardt Jr. to the Winston Cup Series and opted to use the No. 8 which was formerly used by Stavola Brothers Racing, who ceased operations in 1998. Earnhardt Jr. drove the Budweiser No. 8 in five Cup races in 1999, making his debut at Charlotte in the 1999 Coca-Cola 600. He finished in the Top 10 once and led one lap.

In 2000, Earnhardt Jr. moved to the Cup Series on a full-time basis. That year, Earnhardt Jr. won two poles and three races (including The Winston, where he became the first rookie to win the event), but finished runner-up to Matt Kenseth in the competition for NASCAR Rookie of the Year. On July 7, 2001, Earnhardt Jr. won the Pepsi 400 at Daytona, the first Cup race at Daytona after Earnhardt, Sr.'s death. Using the No. 8, Earnhardt Jr. set a record by winning four consecutive races at Talladega.

In 2002, Earnhardt Jr. had a roller-coaster season. He struggled after enduring an April concussion at the NAPA Auto Parts 500—an injury he did not admit to until mid-September. In the three races following Fontana, he finished no better than 30th. However, Earnhardt Jr. rallied to sweep both Talladega races (leading a dominating 133 of 188 laps in the spring race), a pair of Bud Pole Awards and an 11th-place finish in the standings with 11 Top 5s and 16 Top 10 finishes.

In 2003, Earnhardt Jr. became a true title contender, scoring a record-breaking fourth consecutive win in the Aaron's 499 at Talladega, after being involved in a 27-car crash on lap 4. He struggled for most of the race, and was at points a half-lap down, only catching back up to the pack through a caution. The win was controversial because on the last lap, it appeared that Earnhardt Jr. went below the yellow line to gain position, but NASCAR ruled that Matt Kenseth had forced Earnhardt below the line, making it a clean pass. Earnhardt Jr. scored a victory at Phoenix in October, recording a career best 3rd-place effort in the standings, with 13 Top 5s and 21 Top 10 finishes.

On February 15, 2004, 6 years to the day after his father's win, Earnhardt Jr. won the 2004 Daytona 500. He won a further five races that season. Though he failed to qualify for the Chase Cup in 2005, he did race in 2006 when he finished 5th. On May 10, 2007, Earnhardt Jr. announced that he would not return to DEI for the 2008 season; on June 13, 2007, officially announced his move to Hendrick Motorsports (HMS); and on August 16, 2007, that he would not retain the No. 8 car number.

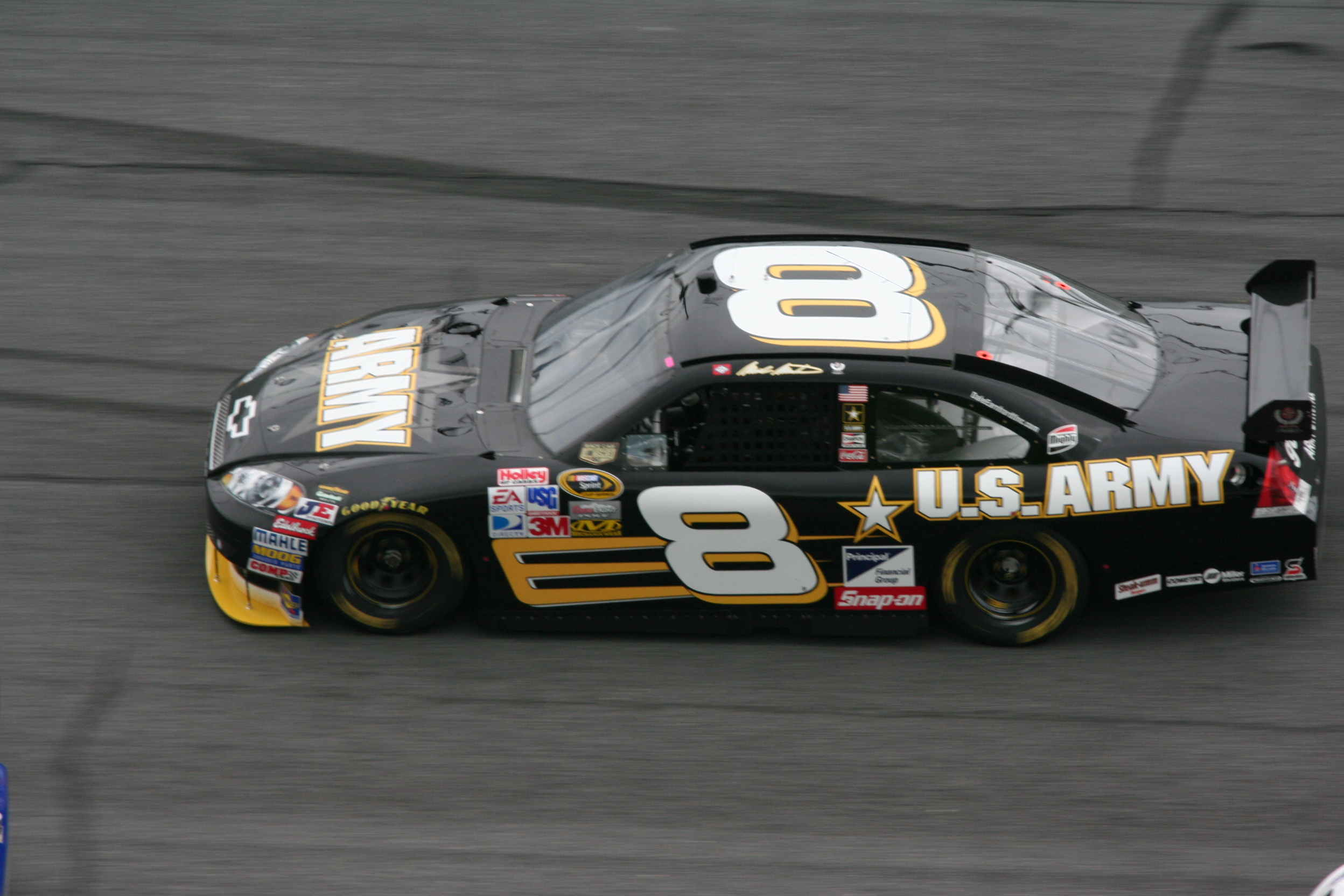
Mark Martin/Aric Almirola split time in the No. 8 in 2008

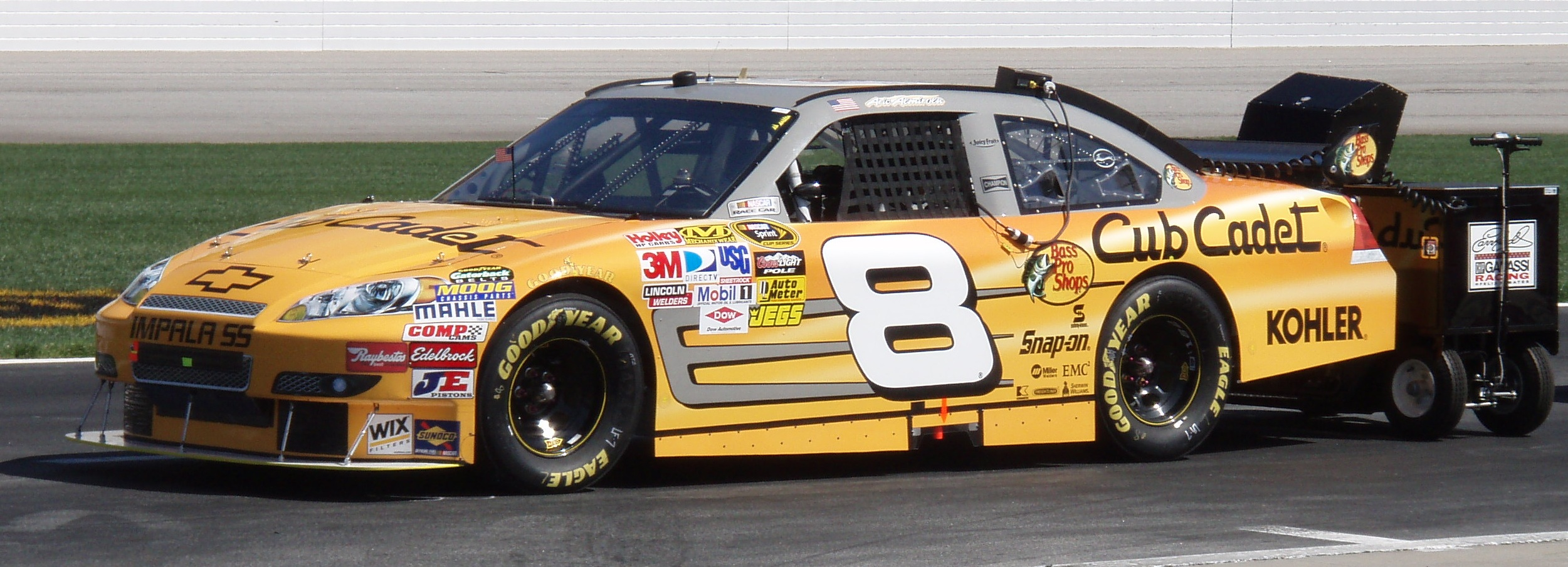
Aric Almirola's No. 8 in 2009

Mark Martin and Aric Almirola (2008-2009)

On September 12, DEI announced Mark Martin and Aric Almirola as co-drivers of the No. 8 U.S. Army Chevrolet with crew chief Tony Gibson for the 2008 season, both finishing 28th and 42nd in points respectively. Martin left DEI after the 2008 season to replace Casey Mears in the No. 5 Kellogg's/Carquest Chevrolet and join Dale Jr. at Hendrick Motorsports. In 2009, the Army withdrew their support in favor of Ryan Newman's No. 39 car at Stewart–Haas Racing.

Almirola was engaged to drive the No. 8 Guitar Hero World Tour Chevrolet for the full 2009 season but the sponsorship lasted only four races. Following the 2009 Samsung 500 at Texas, Earnhardt Ganassi Racing announced that the operations of the No. 8 team were being suspended indefinitely due to a lack of sponsorship (which had been operating on a race to race basis). Almirola sued Earnhardt Ganassi Racing but the matter was settled out of court. Crew chief Doug Randolph would depart and join Richard Childress Racing for the remainder of 2009, while Almirola joined Billy Ballew Motorsports for 16 races in the 2009 NASCAR Camping World Truck Series.

==== Car No. 8 Results ====
NASCAR Sprint Cup Series results
Year	Driver	No.	Manufacturer	1	2	3	4	5	6	7	8	9	10	11	12	13	14	15	16	17	18	19	20	21	22	23	24	25	26	27	28	29	30	31	32	33	34	35	36	Owners	Pts
1999	Dale Earnhardt Jr.	8	Chevy	DAY	CAR	LVS	ATL	DAR	TEX	BRI	MAR	TAL	CAL	RCH	CLT; 16	DOV	MCH	POC	SON	DAY	NHA; 43	POC	IND	GLN	MCH; 24	BRI	DAR	RCH; 10	NHA	DOV	MAR	CLT	TAL	CAR	PHO	HOM	ATL; 14			48th	500
2000	Dale Earnhardt Jr.	8	Chevy	DAY; 13	CAR; 19	LVS; 10	ATL; 29	DAR; 40	BRI; 38	TEX; 1*	MAR; 26	TAL; 42	CAL; 12	RCH; 1	CLT; 4*	DOV; 10	MCH; 13	POC; 19	SON; 24	DAY; 35	NHA; 21	POC; 13	IND; 13	GLN; 40	MCH; 31	BRI; 21	DAR; 11	RCH; 13	NHA; 31	DOV; 16	MAR; 36	CLT; 19	TAL; 14	CAR; 34	PHO; 27	HOM; 13	ATL; 20			16th	3516
2001	Dale Earnhardt Jr.	8	Chevy	DAY; 2	CAR; 43	LVS; 23	ATL; 15	DAR; 34	BRI; 31	TEX; 8	MAR; 11	TAL; 8	CAL; 3	RCH; 7	CLT; 25	DOV; 3	MCH; 39	POC; 20	SON; 19	DAY; 1*	CHI; 11	NHA; 9	POC; 2	IND; 10	GLN; 12	MCH; 12	BRI; 14	DAR; 17	RCH; 3	DOV; 1*	KAN; 33	CLT; 4	MAR; 27	TAL; 1	PHO; 37	CAR; 15	HOM; 15	ATL; 7*	NHA; 24	8th	4460
2002	Dale Earnhardt Jr.	8	Chevy	DAY; 29	CAR; 26	LVS; 16	ATL; 2	DAR; 4	BRI; 4*	TEX; 42	MAR; 5	TAL; 1*	CAL; 36	RCH; 36	CLT; 35	DOV; 30	POC; 12	MCH; 22	SON; 30	DAY; 6	CHI; 10	NHA; 23	POC; 37	IND; 22	GLN; 35	MCH; 10	BRI; 3	DAR; 16	RCH; 4	NHA; 11	DOV; 24	KAN; 6	TAL; 1*	CLT; 9	MAR; 4	ATL; 5	CAR; 34	PHO; 5	HOM; 21	11th	4270
2003	Dale Earnhardt Jr.	8	Chevy	DAY; 36	CAR; 33	LVS; 2*	ATL; 3	DAR; 6*	BRI; 16	TEX; 2	TAL; 1	MAR; 3*	CAL; 6	RCH; 3	CLT; 41	DOV; 11	POC; 4	MCH; 7	SON; 11	DAY; 7	CHI; 38	NHA; 6	POC; 3	IND; 14	GLN; 3	MCH; 32	BRI; 9	DAR; 25	RCH; 17	NHA; 5	DOV; 37	TAL; 2	KAN; 18	CLT; 9	MAR; 4	ATL; 6	PHO; 1	CAR; 13	HOM; 24	3rd	4815
2004	Dale Earnhardt Jr.	8	Chevy	DAY; 1	CAR; 5	LVS; 35	ATL; 1	DAR; 10	BRI; 11	TEX; 4	MAR; 3	TAL; 2	CAL; 9	RCH; 1	CLT; 6	DOV; 3	POC; 6	MCH; 21	SON; 11	DAY; 3	CHI; 22	NHA; 31	POC; 25	IND; 27	GLN; 5	MCH; 21	BRI; 1	CAL; 34	RCH; 2	NHA; 3	DOV; 9	TAL; 1	KAN; 9	CLT; 3	MAR; 33	ATL; 33	PHO; 1	DAR; 11	HOM; 23	5th	6368
2005	Dale Earnhardt Jr.	8	Chevy	DAY; 3	CAL; 32	LVS; 42	ATL; 24	BRI; 4	MAR; 13	TEX; 9	PHO; 4	TAL; 15	DAR; 8	RCH; 14	CLT; 33	DOV; 22	POC; 33	MCH; 17	SON; 42	DAY; 3	CHI; 1	NHA; 9	POC; 32	IND; 43	GLN; 10	MCH; 18	BRI; 9	CAL; 38	RCH; 20	NHA; 5	DOV; 31	TAL; 40	KAN; 34	CLT; 42	MAR; 18	ATL; 4*	TEX; 8	PHO; 40	HOM; 19	19th	3780
2006	Dale Earnhardt Jr.	8	Chevy	DAY; 8*	CAL; 11	LVS; 27	ATL; 3	BRI; 11	MAR; 4	TEX; 12	PHO; 23	TAL; 31	RCH; 1	DAR; 5	CLT; 11	DOV; 10	POC; 14	MCH; 3	SON; 26	DAY; 13	CHI; 5	NHA; 43	POC; 43	IND; 6	GLN; 18	MCH; 6	BRI; 3	CAL; 2	RCH; 17	NHA; 13	DOV; 21	KAN; 10	TAL; 23*	CLT; 4	MAR; 22	ATL; 3	TEX; 6	PHO; 9	HOM; 19	5th	6328
2007	Dale Earnhardt Jr.	8	Chevy	DAY; 32	CAL; 40	LVS; 11	ATL; 14	BRI; 7	MAR; 5	TEX; 36	PHO; 19	TAL; 7	RCH; 13	DAR; 8	CLT; 8	DOV; 22	POC; 12	MCH; 5	SON; 13	NHA; 4	DAY; 36	CHI; 19	IND; 34	POC; 2	GLN; 42	MCH; 12	BRI; 5	CAL; 5	RCH; 30	NHA; 16	DOV; 3	KAN; 10	TAL; 40	CLT; 19	MAR; 23	ATL; 25	TEX; 14	PHO; 43	HOM; 36	16th	3929
2008	Mark Martin	8	Chevy	DAY; 31	CAL; 16	LVS; 10	ATL; 22			TEX; 8	PHO; 5		RCH; 3	DAR; 16	CLT; 15	DOV; 23	POC; 10	MCH; 25			DAY; 10	CHI; 17	IND; 11	POC; 8		MCH; 6			RCH; 5		DOV; 4	KAN; 18		CLT; 9		ATL; 22	TEX; 12	PHO; 14		14th	4097
2008	Aric Almirola	8	Chevy					BRI; 8	MAR; 42			TAL; 33							SON; 25	NHA; 23					GLN; 35		BRI; 13	CAL; 30		NHA; 18			TAL; 13		MAR; 20				HOM; 35	14th	4097

=== Car No. 15 history ===
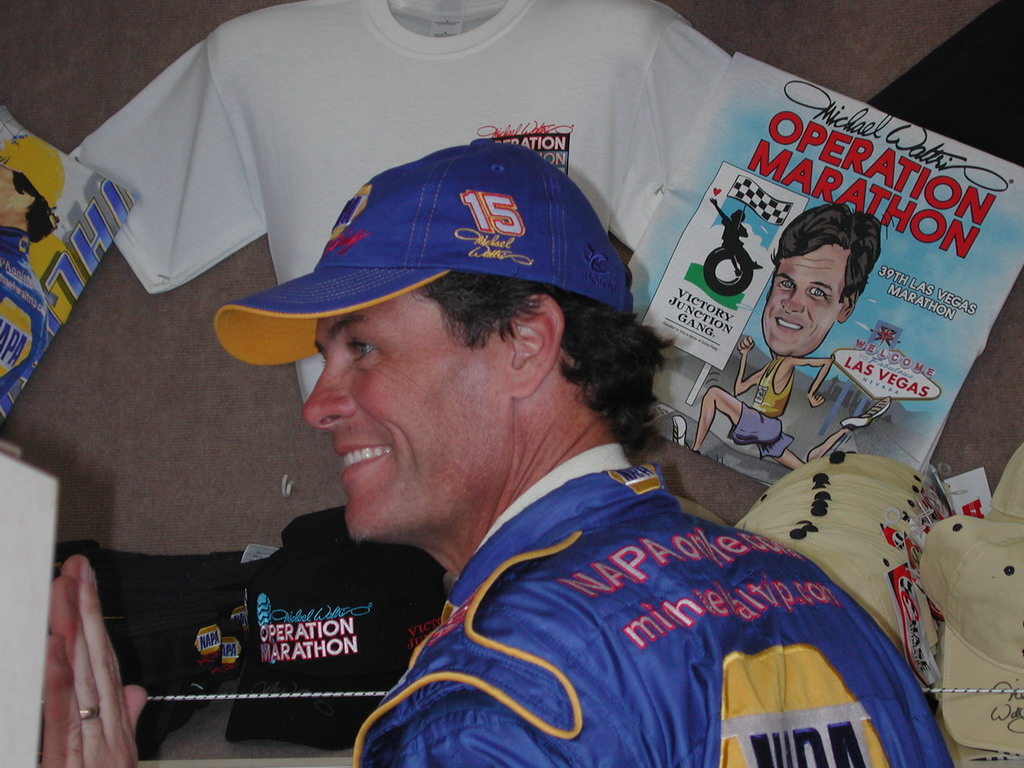
Michael Waltrip drove the No. 15 from 2001 to 2005

Michael Waltrip (2001-2005)

In 2001, the team raced the NAPA sponsored No. 15 (a possible reference to the No. 15 Ford Thunderbird that Earnhardt drove in 1982 and 1983 for Bud Moore Engineering). Michael Waltrip was announced as the driver for the 2001 season. In his first start for DEI, Waltrip won his first race in his 16-year career at the 2001 Daytona 500. An estatic Waltrip's dream come true soon turned into a nightmare, however, as his win was overshadowed by Dale Earnhardt's death. Waltrip soon proved to have prowess at the superspeedways, leading laps at most Talladega and Daytona races. Between 2001 and 2003, Waltrip won four races (three at Daytona and one at Talladega). However, he often struggled to find speed outside of those two tracks. After two disappointing seasons without a win, including a 25th-place points finish in 2005, Waltrip announced he would no longer drive for DEI, taking his NAPA sponsorship to Bill Davis Racing for one year before creating his own race team.

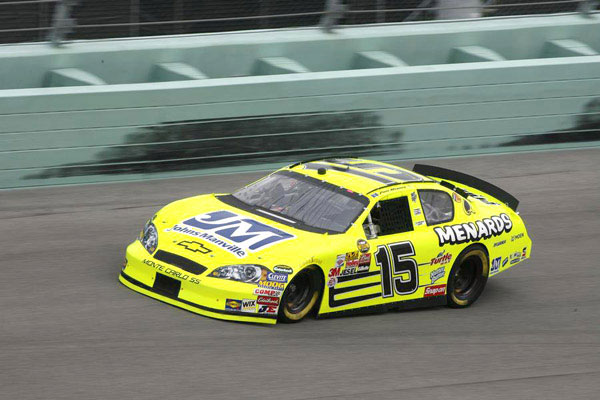
No. 15 Menard's Chevrolet in 2006

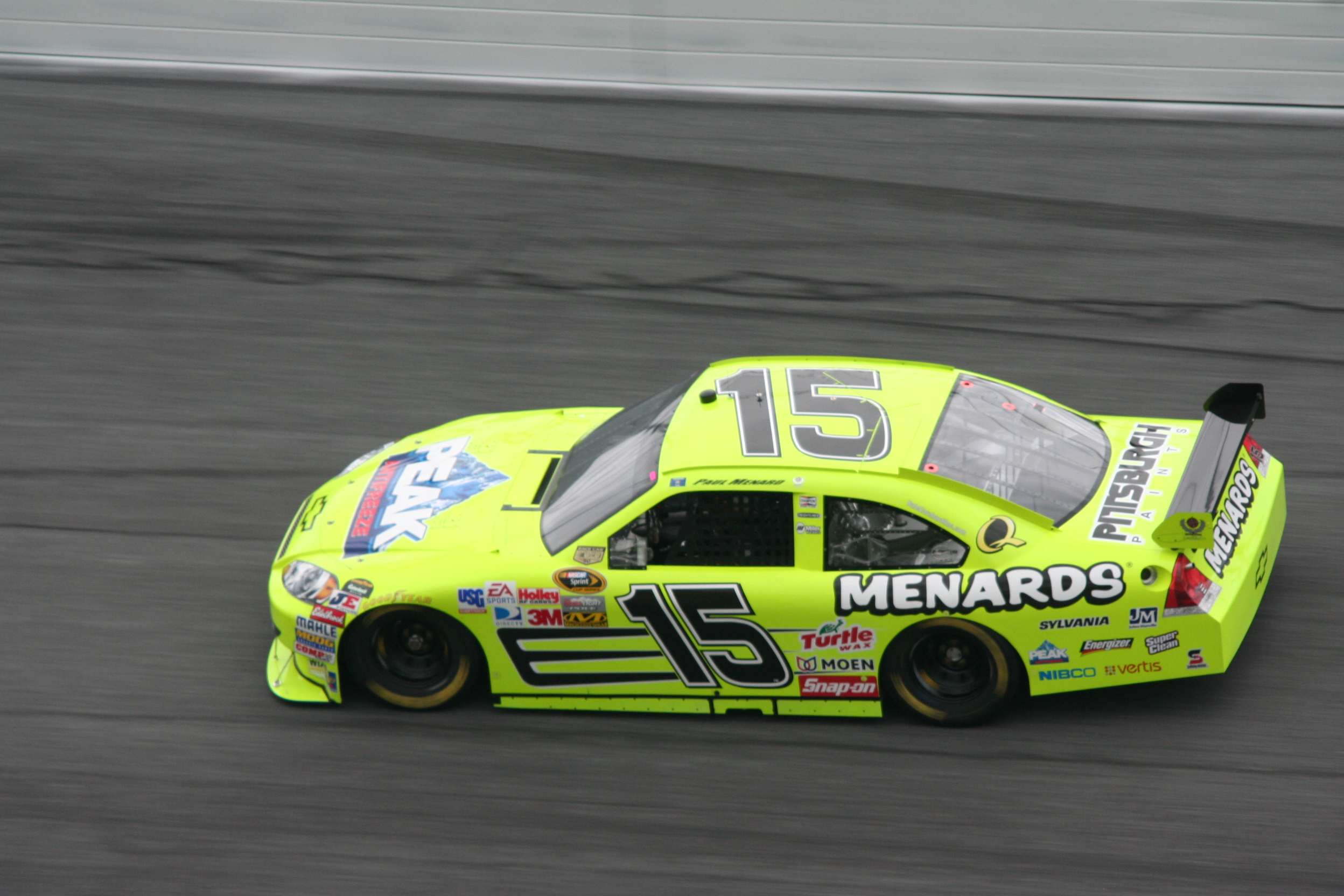
2008 racecar

Paul Menard (2006-2008)

For 2006, the No. 15 team moved to a part-time status, entering ten races but only qualifying for seven. Paul Menard, DEI's Busch Series driver, drove and sponsorship was provided by Menards and PPG Paints. Menard finished 7th at Atlanta and moved to full-time in 2007. After the merger of Ginn Racing and DEI, the No. 15 team absorbed the owner points of the No. 14 car (formerly driven by Sterling Marlin), so they would be guaranteed a spot in each race for the remainder of the 2007 season. After the 2008 season, Menard took his talents and sponsorship to Yates Racing driving the No. 98 Ford. The DEI No. 15 team was disbanded.

==== Car No. 15 results ====
NASCAR Sprint Cup Series results
Year	Driver	No.	Manufacturer	1	2	3	4	5	6	7	8	9	10	11	12	13	14	15	16	17	18	19	20	21	22	23	24	25	26	27	28	29	30	31	32	33	34	35	36	Owners	Pts
2001	Michael Waltrip	15	Chevy	DAY; 1	CAR; 19	LVS; 13	ATL; 23	DAR; 25	BRI; 22	TEX; 39	MAR; 24	TAL; 28	CAL; 43	RCH; 35	CLT; 28	DOV; 43	MCH; 29	POC; 30	SON; 20	DAY; 2	CHI; 22	NHA; 28	POC; 19	IND; 25	GLN; 18	MCH; 36	BRI; 39	DAR; 36	RCH; 20	DOV; 39	KAN; 38	CLT; 18	MAR; 19	TAL; 37	PHO; 23	CAR; 21	HOM; 2	ATL; 26	NHA; 40	24th	3159
2002	Michael Waltrip	15	Chevy	DAY; 5	CAR; 40	LVS; 22	ATL; 40	DAR; 15	BRI; 30	TEX; 28	MAR; 13	TAL; 2	CAL; 10	RCH; 24	CLT; 8	DOV; 21	POC; 8	MCH; 4	SON; 22	DAY; 1*	CHI; 42	NHA; 20	POC; 18	IND; 16	GLN; 9	MCH; 15	BRI; 22	DAR; 24	RCH; 36	NHA; 8	DOV; 12	KAN; 26	TAL; 8	CLT; 11	MAR; 18	ATL; 11	CAR; 19	PHO; 20	HOM; 41	14th	3985
2003	Michael Waltrip	15	Chevy	DAY; 1*	CAR; 19	LVS; 3	ATL; 27	DAR; 5	BRI; 25	TEX; 17	TAL; 24	MAR; 23	CAL; 7	RCH; 12	CLT; 6	DOV; 16	POC; 18	MCH; 5	SON; 13	DAY; 11	CHI; 5	NHA; 28	POC; 4	IND; 16	GLN; 13	MCH; 7	BRI; 42	DAR; 37	RCH; 32	NHA; 26	DOV; 42	TAL; 1	KAN; 39	CLT; 14	MAR; 26	ATL; 38	PHO; 5	CAR; 37	HOM; 41	15th	3934
2004	Michael Waltrip	15	Chevy	DAY; 38	CAR; 33	LVS; 37	ATL; 23	DAR; 35	BRI; 10	TEX; 20	MAR; 15	TAL; 12	CAL; 32	RCH; 10	CLT; 2	DOV; 6	POC; 33	MCH; 10	SON; 4	DAY; 13	CHI; 9	NHA; 6	POC; 36	IND; 20	GLN; 20	MCH; 17	BRI; 27	CAL; 23	RCH; 13	NHA; 9	DOV; 16	TAL; 25	KAN; 11	CLT; 28	MAR; 19	ATL; 14	PHO; 17	DAR; 33	HOM; 17	20th	3878
2005	Michael Waltrip	15	Chevy	DAY; 37	CAL; 38	LVS; 21	ATL; 7	BRI; 19	MAR; 30	TEX; 6	PHO; 2	TAL; 3	DAR; 34	RCH; 9	CLT; 36	DOV; 13	POC; 5	MCH; 7	SON; 22	DAY; 40	CHI; 36	NHA; 17	POC; 26	IND; 16	GLN; 41	MCH; 27	BRI; 15	CAL; 13	RCH; 31	NHA; 15	DOV; 26	TAL; 42	KAN; 40	CLT; 29	MAR; 27	ATL; 11	TEX; 41	PHO; 33	HOM; 29	25th	3452
2006	Paul Menard	15	Chevy	DAY; DNQ	CAL	LVS	ATL; 7	BRI	MAR	TEX	PHO	TAL	RCH	DAR	CLT; 14	DOV	POC	MCH	SON	DAY	CHI; DNQ	NHA	POC	IND; DNQ	GLN; 29	MCH; 20	BRI	CAL	RCH	NHA	DOV	KAN	TAL; 34	CLT	MAR	ATL	TEX; 41	PHO	HOM; 17	45th	669
2007	Paul Menard	15	Chevy	DAY; DNQ	CAL; 20	LVS; 32	ATL; 31	BRI; DNQ	MAR; DNQ	TEX; 15	PHO; 25	TAL; 43	RCH; 16	DAR; 31	CLT; DNQ	DOV; DNQ	POC; 28	MCH; 12	SON; DNQ	NHA; 39	DAY; 21	CHI; 42	IND; 20	POC; 26	GLN; 19	MCH; 39	BRI; 24	CAL; 24	RCH; 26	NHA; 24	DOV; 21	KAN; 27	TAL; 38	CLT; 22	MAR; 24	ATL; 27	TEX; 30	PHO; 22	HOM; 35	34th	2496
2008	Paul Menard	15	Chevy	DAY; 22	CAL; 27	LVS; 22	ATL; 19	BRI; 32	MAR; 16	TEX; 17	PHO; 21	TAL; 14	RCH; 31	DAR; 36	CLT; 41	DOV; 22	POC; 25	MCH; 11	SON; 34	NHA; 29	DAY; 15	CHI; 26	IND; 41	POC; 42	GLN; 28	MCH; 24	BRI; 16	CAL; 37	RCH; 34	NHA; 21	DOV; 21	KAN; 27	TAL; 2	CLT; 26	MAR; 27	ATL; 31	TEX; 22	PHO; 26	HOM; 30	26th	3151

=== Car No. 81 history ===
During the 2003 season, DEI fielded the No. 81 Chevrolet for two races, with Kraft Foods as the main sponsor. The team first attempted to race at Chicagoland with Jason Keller behind the wheel, but he failed to qualify. John Andretti drove the No. 81 car at the 2003 Brickyard 400, but finished 43rd after being involved in an accident on lap 46.

==== Car No. 81 results ====
NASCAR Winston Cup Series results
Year	Driver	No.	Manufacturer	1	2	3	4	5	6	7	8	9	10	11	12	13	14	15	16	17	18	19	20	21	22	23	24	25	26	27	28	29	30	31	32	33	34	35	36	Owners	Pts
2003	Jason Keller	81	Chevy	DAY	CAR	LVS	ATL	DAR	BRI	TEX	TAL	MAR	CAL	RCH	CLT	DOV	POC	MCH	SON	DAY	CHI; DNQ	NHA	POC																	-	-
2003	John Andretti	81	Chevy																					IND; 43	GLN	MCH	BRI	DAR	RCH	NHA	DOV	TAL	KAN	CLT	MAR	ATL	PHO	CAR	HOM	-	-

== Nationwide Series ==
=== Car No. 2 history ===
The No. 2 was driven in one race, the AC Delco 200 at Rockingham. David Bonnett piloted the car as a teammate to Dale Earnhardt, who was in the usual No. 3. Bonnett was involved in a large crash on lap 94 and failed to finish, placing 35th.

=== Cars No. 3 and No. 8 history ===
The No. 8 car was run by DEI starting in 1984, with Dale Earnhardt piloting his self-owned Wrangler Pontiac for the first time in the Mello Yello 300 at Charlotte. The car ran from 1984 to 1988 and then again from 2002 to 2008. Between 1989 and 2000, the No. 8 switched to the No. 3. The car went full time with Jeff Green driving in 1995 and 1996 and later won two championships in 1998 and 1999, with Earnhardt Jr. driving. Drivers of the car from 1984 to 2000 included Dale Earnhardt, Dale Earnhardt Jr., Jody Ridley, Kenny Wallace, Michael Waltrip, Neil Bonnett, David Bonnett, Andy Petree, Jeff Green, Steve Park, and Ron Hornaday Jr. During all six full time seasons (1995–2000), the team finished in the Top 5 in points, occurring with four different drivers.

Dale Earnhardt Jr. won two races in the only two starts for the car after the 2000 season (Richmond 2002 and Daytona 2004). Following Daytona in 2004, the No. 8 switched to Chance 2 Motorsports and ran full-time with Martin Truex Jr. Truex won the 2004 and 2005 Busch Series championships, along with twelve races.

The car returned to DEI part-time in 2006 after Chance 2 folded, with Earnhardt Jr. and Truex combining for three victories. Truex and Kerry Earnhardt drove the No. 8 in the final two series races for the organization in 2008, with Truex finishing 11th at Daytona in February after leading 20 laps. At the July Daytona race, Kerry's car featured sponsorships from Freightliner and Bass Pro Shops, with him finishing 17th. From 2006 to 2008, the car was driven by Earnhardt Jr., Truex, Tony Stewart, and Kerry Earnhardt in 16 races, with Earnhardt winning twice and Truex once.

NASCAR Busch Series results
Year	Driver	No.	Manufacturer	1	2	3	4	5	6	7	8	9	10	11	12	13	14	15	16	17	18	19	20	21	22	23	24	25	26	27	28	29	30	31	32	33	34	35	NBSC	Pts	Ref
1984	Dale Earnhardt	8	Pontiac	DAY	RCH	CAR	HCY	MAR	DAR	ROU	NSV	LGY	MLW	DOV	CLT; 4	SBO	HCY	ROU	SBO	ROU	HCY	IRP	LGY	SBO	BRI	DAR; 19	RCH	NWS	CLT; 38	HCY	CAR	MAR							-	-	
1985	Dale Earnhardt	8	Pontiac	DAY; 35	CAR; 1*	HCY	BRI	MAR	DAR; 29	SBO	LGY	DOV											DAR; 22	RCH; 21	NWS	ROU	CLT; 4	HCY	CAR	MAR									-	-	
1985	Jody Ridley	8	Pontiac										CLT; 29	SBO	HCY	ROU	IRP	SBO	LGY	HCY	MLW	BRI																	-	-	
1986	Dale Earnhardt	8	Pontiac	DAY; 1	CAR; 1	HCY	MAR		DAR; 2*	SBO	LGY	JFC	DOV	CLT; 15	SBO	HCY	ROU										DAR; 1*					CLT; 1*	CAR	MAR					25th	1611	
1986	Dale Earnhardt	8	Chevy					BRI; 2										IRP; 25	SBO	RAL; 3	OXF	SBO	HCY	LGY	ROU	BRI; 2		RCH; 1*	DOV	MAR	ROU								25th	1611	
1987	Dale Earnhardt	8	Chevy	DAY; 27*	HCY	MAR	DAR; 1*	BRI; 4*	LGY	SBO	CLT; 5*	DOV	IRP; 31	ROU	JFC	OXF	SBO	HCY	RAL	LGY	ROU	BRI; 32	JFC	DAR; 35	RCH; 31	DOV	MAR	CLT; 21	CAR; 3*	MAR									33rd	1107	
1988	Dale Earnhardt	8	Chevy	DAY; 37	HCY; 8	CAR; 27*	MAR	DAR; 4	BRI; 1	LNG	NZH; 6	SBO; 25	NSV	CLT; 5	DOV	ROU	LAN	LVL	MYB; 27	OXF	SBO	HCY	LNG	IRP; 29	ROU	BRI; 3	DAR; 32	RCH	DOV		CLT; 33	CAR; 2	MAR						-	-	
1988	Kenny Wallace	8	Chevy																											MAR; 11									-	-	
1989	Dale Earnhardt	3	Pontiac	DAY; 4																																			-	-	
1989	Dale Earnhardt	3	Chevy		CAR; 2	MAR	HCY; 10	DAR; 6	BRI; 27	NZH; 37	SBO	LAN	NSV	CLT; 20	DOV	ROU	LVL	VOL	MYB	SBO; 28	HCY	DUB	IRP; 5	ROU	BRI; 5	DAR; 4*	RCH; 5	DOV	MAR	CLT; 27									-	-	
1989	Michael Waltrip	3	Chevy																												CAR; 7	MAR							-	-	
1990	Dale Earnhardt	3	Chevy	DAY; 1*	RCH; 2	CAR; 1	MAR	HCY; 20	DAR; 29	BRI; 5	LAN	SBO	NZH	HCY	CLT; 8	DOV	ROU	VOL	MYB	OXF	NHA; 7	SBO	DUB	IRP; 3	ROU	BRI; 24*	DAR; 38	RCH; 4	DOV	MAR	CLT; 4	NHA	CAR; 2	MAR					26th	1947	
1991	Dale Earnhardt	3	Chevy	DAY; 1*	RCH; 2	CAR; 3	MAR	VOL	HCY	DAR; 3	BRI; 3	LAN	SBO	NZH	CLT; 1*	DOV	ROU	HCY	MYB	GLN	OXF	NHA; 35	SBO	DUB	IRP; 33	ROU	BRI; 11	DAR; 1*	RCH; 7*	DOV	CLT; 39	NHA	CAR; 6*	MAR					27th	1799	
1992	Dale Earnhardt	3	Chevy	DAY; 1*	CAR; 4*	RCH	ATL; 31	MAR	DAR; 17	BRI	HCY	LAN	DUB	NZH	CLT; 28	DOV; 16	ROU	MYB	GLN			TAL; 4	IRP	ROU	MCH; 3	NHA; 2	BRI	DAR; 4	RCH	DOV	CLT; 41	MAR	CAR; 12	HCY					-	-	
1992	David Bonnett	3	Chevy																	VOL; 9	NHA																		-	-	
1993	Dale Earnhardt	3	Chevy	DAY; 1*	CAR; 3	RCH	DAR	BRI	HCY	ROU	MAR	NZH	CLT; 36	DOV; 13	MYB	GLN	MLW	TAL; 1*	IRP	MCH; 41	NHA; 42	BRI	DAR; 40	RCH	DOV	ROU	CLT; 3	MAR	CAR	HCY	ATL; QL^{†}								-	-	
1993	Neil Bonnett	3	Chevy																												ATL; 35								-	-	
1994	Dale Earnhardt	3	Chevy	DAY; 1	CAR; 38	RCH; DNQ	ATL; 10	MAR	DAR; 6	HCY	BRI	ROU	NHA; 31	NZH	CLT; 23	DOV; 39	MYB	GLN	MLW	SBO	TAL; 3	HCY	IRP	MCH; 32	BRI	DAR; 41	RCH; 3		CLT; 45										-	-	
1994	Michael Waltrip	3	Chevy																									DOV; 41			CAR; 2								-	-	
1994	Andy Petree	3	Chevy																											MAR; 16									-	-	
1995	Jeff Green	3	Chevy	DAY; 7	CAR; 10	RCH; 36	ATL; DNQ	NSV; 10	DAR; 27	BRI; 25	HCY; 29	NHA; 14*	NZH; 4	CLT; 2	DOV; 15	MYB; 4	GLN; 5	MLW; 3*	TAL; 12	SBO; 22	IRP; 9	MCH; 14	BRI; 2	DAR; 9	RCH; 15	DOV; 8	CLT; 11	CAR; 27	HOM; 35										5th	3182	
1996	Jeff Green	3	Chevy	DAY; 25	CAR; 20	RCH; 37	ATL; 32	NSV; 40	DAR; 11	BRI; 2	HCY; 7	NZH; 3	CLT; 43	DOV; 7	SBO; 3	MYB; 5	GLN; 6	MLW; 7	NHA; 4	TAL; 14	IRP; 36	MCH; 18	BRI; 8	DAR; 7	RCH; 27	DOV; 29	CLT; 8	CAR; 8	HOM; 13										4th	3059	
1997	Steve Park	3	Chevy	DAY; 7	CAR; 32	RCH; 3	ATL; 42	LVS; 8	DAR; 34	HCY; 13	TEX; 35	BRI; 6	NSV; 1*	TAL; 2	NHA; 2	NZH; 29	CLT; 16	DOV; 5	SBO; 13	GLN; 6	MLW; 5*	MYB; 9	GTY; 15	IRP; 8	MCH; 1	BRI; 2	DAR; 5	RCH; 1	DOV; 5	CLT; 6	CAL; 2	CAR; 6	HOM; 12						3rd	4080	
1998	Dale Earnhardt Jr.	3	Chevy	DAY; 37	CAR; 16	LVS; 2	NSV; 3	DAR; 10	BRI; 2	TEX; 1	HCY; 8	TAL; 32	NHA; 10	NZH; 28	CLT; 30	DOV; 1*	RCH; 2*	PPR; 10	GLN; 8	MLW; 1*	MYB; 5	CAL; 1*	SBO; 13*	IRP; 1*	MCH; 5	BRI; 15	DAR; 2	RCH; 1*	DOV; 8	CLT; 3*	GTY; 1	CAR; 14	ATL; 2*	HOM; 42					1st	4469	
1999	Dale Earnhardt Jr.	3	Chevy	DAY; 14	CAR; 35	LVS; 6	ATL; 3	DAR; 11	TEX; 10	NSV; 9	BRI; 2	TAL; 6	CAL; 3*	NHA; 34	RCH; 32	NZH; 2	CLT; 2	DOV; 1*	SBO; 1	GLN; 1	MLW; 3	MYB; 25	PPR; 36	GTY; 1*	IRP; 5	MCH; 1*	BRI; 3	DAR; 12	RCH; 1	DOV; 33	CLT; 5	CAR; 13	MEM; 2	PHO; 2	HOM; 2*				1st	4647	
2000	Ron Hornaday Jr.	3	Chevy	DAY; 32*	CAR; 3	LVS; 8	ATL; 16	DAR; 8	BRI; 18	TEX; 17	NSV; 3	TAL; 20	CAL; 19	RCH; 17	NHA; 20	CLT; 12	DOV; 18	SBO; 4	MYB; 9	GLN; 36	MLW; 10	NZH; 1*	PPR; 9	GTY; 6	IRP; 1	MCH; 30	BRI; 15	DAR; 34	RCH; 37	DOV; 14	CLT; 9	CAR; 11	MEM; 14	PHO; 5	HOM; 38				5th	3870	
2002	Dale Earnhardt Jr.	8	Chevy	DAY	CAR	LVS	DAR	BRI	TEX	NSH	TAL	CAL	RCH	NHA	NZH	CLT	DOV	NSH	KEN	MLW	DAY	CHI	GTY	PPR	IRP	MCH	BRI	DAR	RCH; 1*	DOV	KAN	CLT	MEM	ATL	CAR	PHO	HOM		-	-	
2004	Dale Earnhardt Jr.	8	Chevy	DAY; 1*	CAR	LVS	DAR	BRI	TEX	NSH	TAL	CAL	GTY	RCH	NZH	CLT	DOV	NSH	KEN	MLW	DAY	CHI	NHA	PPR	IRP	MCH	BRI	CAL	RCH	DOV	KAN	CLT	MEM	ATL	PHO	DAR	HOM		-	-	
2006	Dale Earnhardt Jr.	8	Chevy	DAY; 17	CAL	MXC	LVS	ATL	BRI	TEX	NSH	PHO									DAY; 1*	CHI; 15	NHA	MAR	GTY	IRP	GLN	MCH; 1	BRI	CAL	RCH							HOM; 7	-	-	
2006	Martin Truex Jr.	8	Chevy										TAL; 1	RCH	DAR	CLT; 5	DOV	NSH	KEN	MLW												DOV; 30	KAN						-	-	
2006	Tony Stewart	8	Chevy																															CLT; 16	MEM	TEX	PHO		-	-	
2007	Dale Earnhardt Jr.	8	Chevy	DAY; 7	CAL	MXC	LVS	ATL	BRI; 6	NSH	TEX	PHO	TAL; 29	RCH	DAR	CLT	DOV	NSH	KEN	MLW	NHA	DAY	CHI	GTY	IRP	CGV	GLN	MCH	BRI	CAL	RCH			CLT; 3	MEM	TEX	PHO	HOM	-	-	
2007	Martin Truex Jr.	8	Chevy																													DOV; 2	KAN						-	-	
2008	Martin Truex Jr.	8	Chevy	DAY; 11	CAL	LVS	ATL	BRI	NSH	TEX	PHO	MXC	TAL	RCH	DAR	CLT	DOV	NSH	KEN	MLW	NHA																		-	-	
2008	Kerry Earnhardt	8	Chevy																			DAY; 17	CHI	GTY	IRP	CGV	GLN	MCH	BRI	CAL	RCH	DOV	KAN	CLT	MEM	TEX	PHO	HOM	-	-	
^{†} - Qualified but replaced by Neil Bonnett

=== Cars No. 11 and No. 15 history ===
The No. 11 car was run by DEI in the Busch Series. During part of 2004 and through all of the 2005 and 2006 NASCAR seasons, Paul Menard made 83 starts in the car, logging 31 Top 10 finishes and collecting one victory at the Milwaukee Mile in June 2006. In 2007, Menard made the full-time transition to the No. 15 car in the Nextel Cup Series, with a season-best finish of 12th in the Citizens Bank 400 at Michigan. Martin Truex Jr. ran two final races in the DEI No. 11 in 2007 at Daytona and Talladega, finishing 6th and 41st respectively. Also in 2007, Menard returned to the series in the No. 15 for eleven races, collecting five Top 10s and a best finish of 4th at Watkins Glen.

NASCAR Busch Series results
Year	Driver	No.	Manufacturer	1	2	3	4	5	6	7	8	9	10	11	12	13	14	15	16	17	18	19	20	21	22	23	24	25	26	27	28	29	30	31	32	33	34	35	NBSC	Pts	Ref
2004	Paul Menard	11	Chevy	DAY	CAR	LVS	DAR	BRI	TEX	NSH	TAL	CAL	GTY	RCH	NZH	CLT	DOV	NSH	KEN	MLW	DAY	CHI	NHA; 18	PPR; 12	IRP; 20	MCH; DNQ	BRI; 36	CAL; 21	RCH; 13	DOV; 15	KAN; 17	CLT; DNQ	MEM; 11	ATL; 19	PHO; 14	DAR; 12	HOM; 34		-	-	
2005	Paul Menard	11	Chevy	DAY; 17	CAL; 20	MXC; 34	LVS; 37	ATL; 24	NSH; 36	BRI; 22	TEX; 18	PHO; 15	TAL; 27	DAR; 30	RCH; 36	CLT; 12	DOV; 28	NSH; 13	KEN; 5	MLW; 3	DAY; 6	CHI; 9	NHA; 7	PPR; 12	GTY; 5	IRP; 7	GLN; 8	MCH; 6	BRI; 41	CAL; 10	RCH; 2	DOV; 10	KAN; 36	CLT; 3	MEM; 6	TEX; 17	PHO; 13	HOM; 5	6th	4101	
2006	Paul Menard	11	Chevy	DAY; 38	CAL; 17	MXC; 5	LVS; 20	ATL; 10	BRI; 16	TEX; 7	NSH; 9	PHO; 17	TAL; 9	RCH; 8	DAR; 13	CLT; 24	DOV; 35	NSH; 5	KEN; 9	MLW; 1*	DAY; 37	CHI; 39	NHA; 4	MAR; 12	GTY; 35	IRP; 9	GLN; 18	MCH; 25	BRI; 10	CAL; 4	RCH; 4	DOV; 37	KAN; 10	CLT; 13	MEM; 23	TEX; 27	PHO; 37	HOM; 3	6th	4075	
2007	Martin Truex Jr.	11	Chevy	DAY; 6	CAL	MXC	LVS	ATL	BRI	NSH	TEX	PHO	TAL; 41	RCH	DAR	CLT	DOV	NSH	KEN	MLW	NHA	DAY	CHI	GTY	IRP	CGV	GLN	MCH	BRI	CAL	RCH	DOV	KAN	CLT	MEM	TEX	PHO	HOM	-	-	
2007	Paul Menard	15	Chevy	DAY; 17	CAL; 37	MXC	LVS; 36	ATL; 18	BRI	NSH	TEX; 9	PHO	TAL	RCH	DAR; 22	CLT	DOV	NSH	KEN	MLW	NHA	DAY	CHI; 6	GTY	IRP	CGV	GLN; 4	MCH; 7	BRI	CAL	RCH; 40	DOV	KAN; 7	CLT	MEM	TEX	PHO	HOM	43rd	1208	

=== Car No. 31 history ===
The No. 31 car ran as a second entry alongside the No. 3 for several races in the 1990s. Ron Hornaday Jr. attempted one race at Rockingham in 1995 in the No. 16 but failed to qualify for the event. In 1996, Dale Earnhardt Jr. and Steve Park both participated in one race, in what was the first series start for Earnhardt and the third for Park. After Park moved to the No. 3 in 1997, Earnhardt drove six races in the No. 31, finishing a season-best seventh at Michigan. He failed to qualify for two more races that season. The car returned in 1999 for Hornaday, failing to finish at Daytona but leading the most laps and finishing sixth at Phoenix. Hornaday finished the season with a twelfth-place finish at Homestead.

NASCAR Busch Series results
Year	Driver	No.	Manufacturer	1	2	3	4	5	6	7	8	9	10	11	12	13	14	15	16	17	18	19	20	21	22	23	24	25	26	27	28	29	30	31	32	NBSC	Pts	Ref
1995	Ron Hornaday Jr.	16	Chevy	DAY	CAR	RCH	ATL	NSV	DAR	BRI	HCY	NHA	NZH	CLT	DOV	MYB	GLN	MLW	TAL	SBO	IRP	MCH	BRI	DAR	RCH	DOV	CLT	CAR; DNQ	HOM							N/A	N/A	
1996	Dale Earnhardt Jr.	31	Chevy	DAY	CAR	RCH	ATL	NSV	DAR	BRI	HCY	NZH	CLT	DOV	SBO	MYB; 14	GLN	MLW	NHA	TAL	IRP	MCH	BRI	DAR	RCH	DOV										-	-	
1996	Steve Park	31	Chevy																								CLT; 29	CAR	HOM							-	-	
1997	Dale Earnhardt Jr.	31	Chevy	DAY	CAR	RCH	ATL	LVS	DAR	HCY; DNQ	TEX	BRI	NSV; 39	TAL	NHA	NZH	CLT	DOV	SBO	GLN; 39	MLW	MYB	GTY; 38	IRP	MCH; 7	BRI	DAR	RCH	DOV	CLT; DNQ	CAL	CAR; 16	HOM; 13			-	-	
1999	Ron Hornaday Jr.	31	Chevy	DAY; 34	CAR	LVS	ATL	DAR	TEX	NSV	BRI	TAL	CAL	NHA	RCH	NZH	CLT	DOV	SBO	GLN	MLW	MYB	PPR	GTY	IRP	MCH	BRI	DAR	RCH	DOV	CLT	CAR	MEM	PHO; 6*	HOM; 12	-	-	

=== Chance 2 Motorsports ===
Chance 2 Motorsports was a jointly owned subsidiary of DEI and Dale Earnhardt Jr. The organization was operated by Earnhardt Jr. and Teresa Earnhardt and was a separate operation from DEI. The team won two Busch Series championships with Martin Truex Jr. in 2004 and 2005, in addition to 16 races with Truex Jr. and Earnhardt Jr. After this, Earnhardt Jr. left the partnership with his stepmother to focus on his own race team, JR Motorsports.

== Truck Series ==
=== Truck No. 16 history ===
Dale Earnhardt, Inc. was a part of the NASCAR Craftsman Truck Series from 1995 through 1999. Ron Hornaday Jr. was the full-time driver of the No. 16 Chevrolet C/K, sponsored by Papa John's Pizza in 1995 and NAPA Auto Parts from 1996 to 1999. Hornaday collected 25 wins for DEI and the 1996 and 1998 NASCAR Craftsman Truck Series championships.

NASCAR Craftsman Truck Series results
Year	Driver	No.	Manufacturer	1	2	3	4	5	6	7	8	9	10	11	12	13	14	15	16	17	18	19	20	21	22	23	24	25	26	27	NCTC	Pts
1995	Ron Hornaday Jr.	16	Chevy	PHO; 9	TUS; 1*	SGS; 6	MMR; 1*	POR; 9	EVG; 1*	I70; 14	LVL; 16	BRI; 9	MLW; 3	CNS; 3*	HPT; 1*	IRP; 19	FLM; 1*	RCH; 15	MAR; 13	NWS; 5	SON; 1*	MMR; 15*	PHO; 5								3rd	2986
1996	Ron Hornaday Jr.	16	Chevy	HOM; 3	PHO; 5	POR; 1*	EVG; 2	TUS; 3	CNS; 8	HPT; 3	BRI; 8	NZH; 5	MLW; 3	LVL; 1*	I70; 4*	IRP; 4	FLM; 6	GLN; 1*	NSV; 2	RCH; 2	NHA; 1	MAR; 4	NWS; 22	SON; 2	MMR; 2*	PHO; 7	LVS; 10				1st	3831
1997	Ron Hornaday Jr.	16	Chevy	WDW; 30	TUS; 1	HOM; 6	PHO; 4	POR; 2	EVG; 9	I70; 22	NHA; 29	TEX; 27	BRI; 1*	NZH; 24	MLW; 1	LVL; 1*	CNS; 1*	HPT; 3*	IRP; 1	FLM; 1*	NSV; 2*	GLN; 5	RCH; 16	MAR; 32	SON; 26	MMR; 28*	CAL; 9	PHO; 9	LVS; 3		5th	3574
1998	Ron Hornaday Jr.	16	Chevy	WDW; 1	HOM; 8	PHO; 1	POR; 6	EVG; 2	I70; 6	GLN; 4*	TEX; 24	BRI; 1*	MLW; 4	NZH; 1*	CAL; 3*	PPR; 1*	IRP; 28	NHA; 10	FLM; 2	NSV; 7	HPT; 8	LVL; 17	RCH; 22	MEM; 1	GTY; 2	MAR; 3	SON; 23	MMR; 4	PHO; 3	LVS; 2	1st	4072
1999	Ron Hornaday Jr.	16	Chevy	HOM; 4	PHO; 1*	EVG; 1*	MMR; 4*	MAR; 16	MEM; 6	PPR; 6	I70; 11	BRI; 18	TEX; 10*	PIR; 27	GLN; 5	MLW; 7	NSV; 23	NZH; 24*	MCH; 9	NHA; 18	IRP; 29	GTY; 21	HPT; 6	RCH; 2	LVS; 3*	LVL; 6	TEX; 10*	CAL; 6*			7th	3488

=== Truck No. 76 history ===
A second DEI truck, the No. 76, only made four total starts. Dennis Dyer and David Green each ran one race in 1995 at Sonoma and Phoenix, and Steve Park made a single start in both 1996 and 1997 at Las Vegas and Phoenix. Dyer was sponsored by Papa John's Pizza, while David Green received sponsorship from Smith & Wesson. Both of Steve Park's starts were in the Action Racing Collectables (now Lionel Racing) colors, a company which Dale Earnhardt partially owned.

NASCAR Craftsman Truck Series results
Year	Driver	No.	Manufacturer	1	2	3	4	5	6	7	8	9	10	11	12	13	14	15	16	17	18	19	20	21	22	23	24	25	26	NCTC	Pts	Ref
1995	Dennis Dyer	76	Chevy	PHO	TUS	SGS	MMR	POR	EVG	I70	LVL	BRI	MLW	CNS	HPT	IRP	FLM	RCH	MAR	NWS	SON; 26	MMR								-	-	
1995	David Green	76	Chevy																				PHO; 9							-	-	
1996	Steve Park	76	Chevy	HOM	PHO	POR	EVG	TUS	CNS	HPT	BRI	NZH	MLW	LVL	I70	IRP	FLM	GLN	NSV	RCH	NHA	MAR	NWS	SON	MMR	PHO	LVS; 15			-	-	
1997	Steve Park	76	Chevy	WDW	TUS	HOM	PHO	POR	EVG	I70	NHA	TEX	BRI	NZH	MLW	LVL	CNS	HPT	IRP	FLM	NSV	GLN	RCH	MAR	SON	MMR	CAL	PHO; 25	LVS	111th	88	

== Partnerships ==
=== RAD Engine partnership ===
After the Fords were dominating the restrictor plate tracks in the late 1990s, DEI, Richard Childress Racing, and Andy Petree Racing partnered up with each other and formed the RAD Engine Program. Their first win was at the 2000 Winston 500 with Dale Earnhardt (which ended up being his 76th and final win). DEI won the 2001 Daytona 500, 2001 Pepsi 400, 2001 EA Sports 500, 2002 Aaron's 499, 2002 Pepsi 400, 2002 EA Sports 500, and the 2003 Daytona 500. RAD ended after Petree pulled out of the series in 2003 to focus on his Busch series program.

=== Earnhardt Childress Racing Technology ===
Earnhardt-Childress Racing Engines (ECR) was formed in May 2007 with cooperation between DEI and Richard Childress Racing, developing and building engines common to the Chevrolet NASCAR Cup Series and NASCAR Nationwide Series teams. In mid-2008, a stand-alone facility north of Salisbury in Welcome, North Carolina was completed. ECR employs 130 technicians. Its engines have won in the 2010 Daytona 500 and Brickyard 400 with Jamie McMurray, the 2011 Southern 500 with Regan Smith, Coca-Cola 600 with Kevin Harvick, and Brickyard 400 with Paul Menard. The company is currently operated solely by RCR as ECR Engines.

=== JR Motorsports, Richard Childress, and Wrangler ===
On April 29, 2010, at the time of Earnhardt's induction to the NASCAR Hall of Fame, DEI announced a partnership with JR Motorsports, Richard Childress Racing, and Wrangler Jeans where, for one race, as a tribute to his father, Dale Earnhardt Jr. would drive the No. 3 Chevrolet Impala. The blue and gold paint scheme paid homage to the car Dale Earnhardt drove in the 1980s. The car was raced in the Nationwide Series race at Daytona International Speedway on July 2, 2010. It was the first Nationwide Series race to use the Car of Tomorrow. Earnhardt Jr. started third, led for thirty-three laps and won the race. This was his first competitive NASCAR win since 2008, and was also the first and latest time DEI was involved in the NASCAR garage following their exit from NASCAR as a racing team.

=== Morgan-Dollar Motorsports ===
In 2007, DEI made a driver development contract with Morgan-Dollar Motorsports to provide trucks for developing drivers in 2007. This was inherited in the merger with Ginn Racing.
