= 2006 Sylvania 300 =

Race details
- Race 27 of 36 in the 2006 NASCAR Nextel Cup Series
- 2006 Sylvania 300 program cover
- Date: September 17, 2006
- Location: New Hampshire International Speedway, Loudon, New Hampshire
- Course: Permanent racing facility
- Course length: 1.058 miles (1.703 km)
- Distance: 300 laps, 317.4 mi (510.806 km)
- Average speed: 102.195 miles per hour (164.467 km/h)

Pole position
Driver	Kevin Harvick	Richard Childress Racing
- Time: 28.793

Most laps led
Driver	Kevin Harvick	Richard Childress Racing
- Laps: 196

Winner
No. 29	Kevin Harvick	Richard Childress Racing

Television in the United States
- Network: TNT
- Announcers: Bill Weber & Wally Dallenbach Jr.

The 2006 Sylvania 300 was a NASCAR Nextel Cup Series race held on September 17, 2006 at New Hampshire International Speedway, in Loudon, New Hampshire. Contested over 300 laps on the 1.058-mile (1.703-kilometre) speedway, it was the 27th race of the 2006 NASCAR Nextel Cup Series season. Kevin Harvick of Richard Childress Racing won the race.

== Background ==
New Hampshire International Speedway is a 1.058-mile (1.703-kilometre) oval speedway located in Loudon, New Hampshire which has hosted NASCAR racing annually since the early 1990s, as well as an IndyCar weekend and the oldest motorcycle race in North America, the Loudon Classic. Nicknamed "The Magic Mile", the speedway is often converted into a 1.6-mile (2.6-kilometre) road course, which includes much of the oval. The track was originally the site of Bryar Motorsports Park before being purchased and redeveloped by Bob Bahre. The track is currently one of eight major NASCAR tracks owned and operated by Speedway Motorsports.

== Qualifying ==
Pos	Car #	Driver	Make	Primary Sponsor	Speed	Time	Behind
1	29	Kevin Harvick	Chevrolet	Reese's	132.282	28.793	0.000
2	24	Jeff Gordon	Chevrolet	DuPont	131.751	28.909	-0.116
3	2	Kurt Busch	Dodge	Miller Lite	131.483	28.968	-0.175
4	12	Ryan Newman	Dodge	Mobil 1	131.216	29.027	-0.234
5	11	Denny Hamlin	Chevrolet	FedEx Express	130.667	29.149	-0.356
6	40	David Stremme	Dodge	Lone Star Steakhouse / Saloon	130.305	29.230	-0.437
7	48	Jimmie Johnson	Chevrolet	Lowe's	130.264	29.239	-0.446
8	16	Greg Biffle	Ford	National Guard	130.193	29.255	-0.462
9	7	Robby Gordon	Chevrolet	Jim Beam	130.086	29.279	-0.486
10	21	Ken Schrader	Ford	Motorcraft Genuine Parts	130.038	29.290	-0.497
11	1	Martin Truex Jr	Chevrolet	Bass Pro Shops / Tracker	130.007	29.297	-0.504
12	25	Brian Vickers	Chevrolet	GMAC	129.993	29.300	-0.507
13	8	Dale Earnhardt Jr	Chevrolet	Budweiser	129.842	29.334	-0.541
14	19	Elliott Sadler	Dodge	Dodge Dealers / UAW	129.829	29.337	-0.544
15	38	David Gilliland	Ford	M&M's	129.825	29.338	-0.545
16	5	Kyle Busch	Chevrolet	Kellogg's	129.763	29.352	-0.559
17	1	Joe Nemechek	Chevrolet	U.S. Army	129.763	29.352	-0.559
18	7	Clint Bowyer	Chevrolet	Jack Daniel's	129.736	29.358	-0.565
19	99	Carl Edwards	Ford	Office Depot	129.652	29.377	-0.584
20	66	Jeff Green	Chevrolet	Haas Automation / Best Buy	129.600	29.389	-0.596
21	22	Dave Blaney	Dodge	Caterpillar	129.577	29.394	-0.601
22	31	Jeff Burton	Chevrolet	Cingular Wireless	129.533	29.404	-0.611
23	10	Scott Riggs	Dodge	Stanley Tools / Valvoline	129.481	29.416	-0.623
24	42	Casey Mears	Dodge	Texaco / Havoline	129.437	29.426	-0.633
25	17	Matt Kenseth	Ford	DEWALT	129.375	29.440	-0.647
26	6	Mark Martin	Ford	AAA	129.322	29.452	-0.659
27	45	Kyle Petty	Dodge	Petty Enterprises / Victory Junction	129.300	29.457	-0.664
28	96	Tony Raines	Chevrolet	DLP HDTV	129.278	29.462	-0.669
29	43	Bobby Labonte	Dodge	Cheerios / Betty Crocker	129.239	29.471	-0.678
30	14	Sterling Marlin	Chevrolet	Ginn Clubs & Resorts	129.121	29.498	-0.705
31	41	Reed Sorenson	Dodge	Target	129.112	29.500	-0.707
32	20	Tony Stewart	Chevrolet	The Home Depot	129.072	29.509	-0.716
33	9	Kasey Kahne	Dodge	Dodge Dealers / UAW	128.998	29.526	-0.733
34	32	Travis Kvapil	Chevrolet	Tide-Downy	128.789	29.574	-0.781
35	55	Michael Waltrip	Dodge	NAPA Auto Parts	128.723	29.589	-0.796
36	18	JJ Yeley	Chevrolet	Interstate Batteries	128.632	29.610	-0.817
37	88	Dale Jarrett	Ford	UPS	128.602	29.617	-0.824
38	61	Chad Chaffin	Dodge	Oak Glove Co.	128.126	29.727	-0.934
39	4	Scott Wimmer	Chevrolet	Lucas Oil Products	128.023	29.751	-0.958
40	49	Kevin Lepage	Dodge	LoansDepot.com	127.363	29.905	-1.112
41	89	Morgan Shepherd	Dodge	Victory In Jesus	127.197	29.944	-1.151
42	26	Jamie McMurray	Ford	Crown Royal	127.125	29.961	-1.168
43	27	Ted Christopher	Chevrolet	Lilly Trucking of Virginia	126.795	30.039	-1.246
Failed to qualify
44	30	Stanton Barrett	Chevrolet	Quality Metric / Pro30.com		30.108	
45	74	Derrike Cope	Dodge	Howes Lubricator / Royal Admin.		30.163	
46	46	Carl Long	Dodge	Millstar Tools		30.442	
47	78	Kenny Wallace	Chevrolet	Furniture Row Racing		30.454	
48	34	Chad Blount	Chevrolet	Oak Glove Co.		30.902	

== Results ==
POS	ST	#	DRIVER	SPONSOR / OWNER	CAR	LAPS	MONEY	STATUS	LED	PTS
1	1	29	Kevin Harvick	Reese's (Richard Childress)	Chevrolet	300	266461	running	196	190
2	32	20	Tony Stewart	The Home Depot (Joe Gibbs)	Chevrolet	300	220686	running	0	170
3	2	24	Jeff Gordon	DuPont (Rick Hendrick)	Chevrolet	300	171536	running	34	170
4	5	11	Denny Hamlin	FedEx Express (Joe Gibbs)	Chevrolet	300	113050	running	4	165
5	12	25	Brian Vickers	GMAC (Rick Hendrick)	Chevrolet	300	118625	running	0	155
6	14	19	Elliott Sadler	Dodge Dealers / UAW (Ray Evernham)	Dodge	300	125516	running	0	150
7	22	31	Jeff Burton	Cingular Wireless (Richard Childress)	Chevrolet	300	137570	running	52	151
8	36	18	J.J. Yeley	Interstate Batteries (Joe Gibbs)	Chevrolet	300	119050	running	4	147
9	21	22	Dave Blaney	Caterpillar (Bill Davis)	Dodge	300	103033	running	5	143
10	25	17	Matt Kenseth	DeWalt (Jack Roush)	Ford	300	130466	running	1	139
11	26	6	Mark Martin	AAA (Jack Roush)	Ford	300	95975	running	1	135
12	4	12	Ryan Newman	Mobil 1 (Roger Penske)	Dodge	300	121583	running	0	127
13	13	8	Dale Earnhardt Jr.	Budweiser (Dale Earnhardt, Inc.)	Chevrolet	300	115716	running	0	124
14	8	16	Greg Biffle	National Guard (Jack Roush)	Ford	300	93675	running	0	121
15	9	7	Robby Gordon	Jim Beam (Robby Gordon)	Chevrolet	300	77425	running	2	123
16	33	9	Kasey Kahne	Dodge Dealers / UAW (Ray Evernham)	Dodge	300	109389	running	0	115
17	31	41	Reed Sorenson	Target (Chip Ganassi)	Dodge	300	83625	running	0	112
18	19	99	Carl Edwards	Office Depot (Jack Roush)	Ford	300	91525	running	0	109
19	3	2	Kurt Busch	Miller Lite (Roger Penske)	Dodge	300	114058	running	0	106
20	6	40	David Stremme	Lone Star Steakhouse & Saloon (Chip Ganassi)	Dodge	300	101883	running	0	103
21	24	42	Casey Mears	Texaco / Havoline (Chip Ganassi)	Dodge	300	108758	running	0	100
22	11	1	Martin Truex Jr.	Bass Pro Shops / Tracker (Dale Earnhardt, Inc.)	Chevrolet	300	96458	running	0	97
23	35	55	Michael Waltrip	NAPA Auto Parts (Doug Bawel)	Dodge	299	86608	running	0	94
24	18	07	Clint Bowyer	Jack Daniel's (Richard Childress)	Chevrolet	299	81700	running	0	91
25	30	14	Sterling Marlin	Ginn Clubs & Resorts (Bobby Ginn)	Chevrolet	299	83347	running	1	93
26	28	96	Tony Raines	DLP HDTV (Bill Saunders)	Chevrolet	299	73100	running	0	85
27	34	32	Travis Kvapil	Tide / Downy (Cal Wells)	Chevrolet	299	72875	running	0	82
28	37	88	Dale Jarrett	UPS (Yates Racing)	Ford	299	104250	running	0	79
29	42	26	Jamie McMurray	Crown Royal (Jack Roush)	Ford	298	116225	running	0	76
30	40	49	Kevin Lepage	LoansDepot.com (Beth Ann Morgenthau)	Dodge	297	69650	running	0	73
31	39	4	Scott Wimmer	Lucas Oil Products (Larry McClure)	Chevrolet	297	68950	running	0	70
32	17	01	Joe Nemechek	U.S. Army (Bobby Ginn)	Chevrolet	295	95070	running	0	67
33	10	21	Ken Schrader	Motorcraft Genuine Parts (Wood Brothers)	Ford	295	96689	running	0	64
34	38	61	Chad Chaffin	Oak Glove Co. (Jeff Stec)	Dodge	293	68325	running	0	61
35	23	10	Scott Riggs	Stanley Tools / Valvoline (James Rocco)	Dodge	291	68125	running	0	58
36	15	38	David Gilliland	M&M's (Yates Racing)	Ford	291	95808	running	0	55
37	27	45	Kyle Petty	Petty Enterprises / Victory Junction Gang (Petty Enterprises)	Dodge	290	75700	engine	0	52
38	16	5	Kyle Busch	Kellogg's (Rick Hendrick)	Chevrolet	276	85500	running	0	49
39	7	48	Jimmie Johnson	Lowe's (Rick Hendrick)	Chevrolet	233	115911	running	0	46
40	29	43	Bobby Labonte	Cheerios / Betty Crocker (Petty Enterprises)	Dodge	207	104161	crash	0	43
41	43	27	Ted Christopher	Lilly Trucking of Virginia (Kirk Shelmerdine)	Chevrolet	123	67060	brakes	0	40
42	41	89	Morgan Shepherd	Victory In Jesus (Morgan Shepherd)	Dodge	61	66935	overheating	0	37
43	20	66	Jeff Green	Haas Automation / Best Buy (Gene Haas)	Chevrolet	2	75139	crash	0	34
Failed to qualify, withdrew, or driver changes:
POS	NAME	NBR	SPONSOR	OWNER	CAR					
44	Stanton Barrett	30	Quality Metric / Pro30.com	Rick Ware	Chevrolet					
45	Derrike Cope	74	Howes Lubricator / Royal Admin.	Raynard McGlynn	Dodge					
46	Carl Long	46	Millstar Tools	Don Cupp	Dodge					
47	Kenny Wallace	78	Furniture Row Racing	Barney Visser	Chevrolet					
48	Chad Blount	34	Oak Glove Co.	Bob Jenkins	Chevrolet					

== Race statistics ==
- Time of race: 3:06:21
- Average speed: 102.195 miles per hour (164.467 km/h)
- Pole speed: 132.282 miles per hour (212.887 km/h)
- Cautions: 10 for 47 laps
- Margin of victory: 0.777 seconds
- Lead changes: 17
- Percent of race run under caution: 15.7%
- Average green flag run: 23 laps
