= 2004 Advance Auto Parts 500 =

Race details
- Race 8 of 36 in the 2004 NASCAR Nextel Cup Series
- Date: April 18, 2004
- Location: Martinsville Speedway, Martinsville, Virginia
- Course: Permanent racing facility
- Course length: 0.526 miles (0.847 km)
- Distance: 500 laps, 263 mi (423.257 km)
- Average speed: 68.169 mph (109.707 km/h)
- Attendance: 91,000

Pole position
Driver	Jeff Gordon	Hendrick Motorsports
- Time: 20.252

Most laps led
Driver	Jeff Gordon	Hendrick Motorsports
- Laps: 180

Winner
No. 2	Rusty Wallace	Penske-Jasper Racing

Television in the United States
- Network: Fox
- Announcers: Mike Joy, Darrell Waltrip, Larry McReynolds
- Nielsen ratings: 5.4/14 (Final); 4.4/11 (Overnight); (8.5 million)

The 2004 Advance Auto Parts 500 was the eighth stock car race of the 2004 NASCAR Nextel Cup Series. It was held on April 18, 2004, at Martinsville Speedway in Martinsville, Virginia before a crowd of 91,000. The 500-lap race was won by Rusty Wallace of Penske-Jasper Racing after starting 17th; it was Wallace's 55th and final career victory. Bobby Labonte finished 2nd and Dale Earnhardt Jr. came in 3rd.

== Report ==
=== Background ===
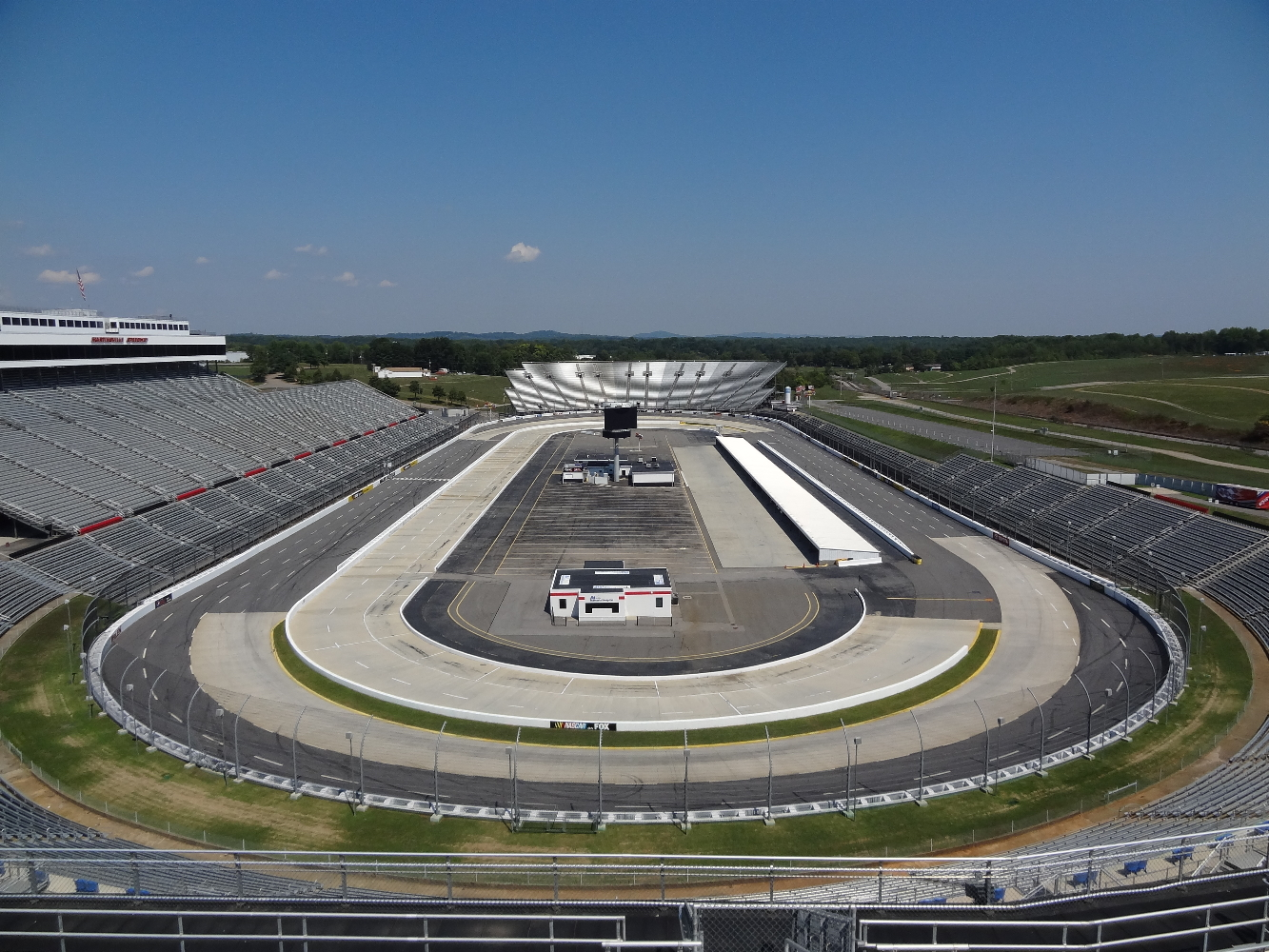
Martinsville Speedway, where the race was held

Martinsville Speedway is one of five short tracks to hold NASCAR races; the others are Richmond International Raceway, Dover International Speedway, Bristol Motor Speedway, and Phoenix International Raceway. The standard track at Martinsville Speedway is a four-turn, 0.526-mile (0.847 km) oval. Its turns are banked at eleven degrees, and neither the front stretch (the location of the finish line) nor the backstretch is banked.

Before the race Kurt Busch led the Drivers' Championship with 1,032 points, nineteen ahead of Matt Kenseth in second, and a further sixteen in front of Dale Earnhardt Jr. in third. Tony Stewart was fourth on 946 points, and Elliott Sadler was a further four points behind in fifth. Ford was leading the Manufacturers' Championship with 48 points; Chevrolet was second with 43 points, and Dodge was a close third on 42. Jeff Gordon was the race's defending champion.

=== Practice and qualifying ===
Three practice sessions were held before the Sunday race: one on Friday and two on Saturday. The first session lasted 90 minutes, and the second and final sessions lasted 45 minutes. Jeff Gordon was fastest in the first practice session with a lap of 20.325 seconds; Ryan Newman was second and Jimmie Johnson third. Kasey Kahne took the fourth position with a time of 20.371, and Busch placed fifth. Robby Gordon, Earnhardt, Jamie McMurray, Ricky Rudd, and Sadler rounded out the session's top-ten drivers.

Although forty-four drivers were entered in the qualifier; according to NASCAR's qualifying procedure, only forty-three could race. Jeff Gordon clinched his third consecutive pole position at Martinsville Speedway with a time of 20.252 seconds. He was joined on the front row of the grid by McMurray. Newman qualified third, Earnhardt fourth, and Kevin Harvick fifth. Ward Burton, Busch, Johnson. Sadler and Jeremy Mayfield rounded out the top ten qualifiers. The driver that failed to qualify was Todd Bodine. After the qualifier, Gordon said, "We came with the basic setup that we sat on the pole here the last time with and we had to make some adjustments. We tweaked it and at the end of practice, I felt like we hit on some things. I took off and the car did everything I really wanted it to do. I couldn't ask for much more than I got out of the car."

On Saturday morning, Mark Martin set the fastest time in the second practice session with a lap of 20.561 seconds, ahead of Harvick and Terry Labonte. Ricky Craven (with a time of 20.599) was fourth-fastest; Mayfield was fifth and McMurray sixth. Jeff Gordon, Scott Riggs, Johnson, and Robby Gordon followed in the top ten. Later that day, Earnhardt paced the final practice session with a time of 20.580; Johnson was second and Busch third. Jeff Gordon was fourth-fastest, ahead of Newman and Harvick. Terry Labonte was seventh-fastest, Robby Gordon eighth, Jeff Green ninth, and Craven tenth. Jeff Burton was afflicted with a problem with his brakes in the closing stages of the session; he spun back into the wall and heavily damaged his car's left side. Burton switched to a back-up car.

== Standings after the race ==
Drivers' Championship standings

	Pos	Driver	Points
2	1	Dale Earnhardt Jr.	1,167
1	2	Kurt Busch	1,162
1	3	Matt Kenseth	1,155
2	4	Jimmie Johnson	1,088
	5	Elliott Sadler	1,069

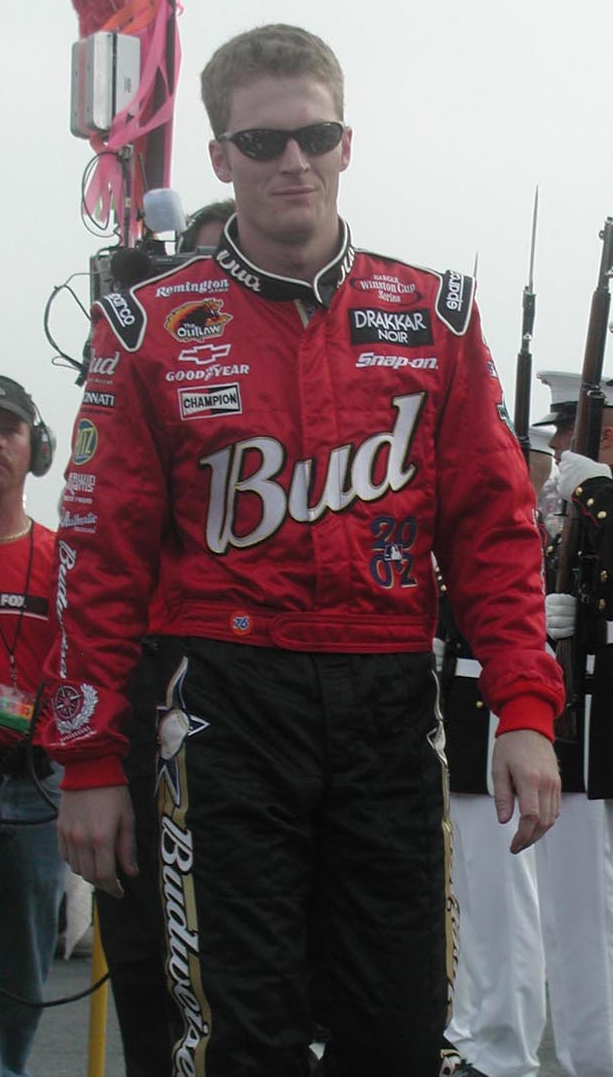
Dale Earnhardt Jr. (pictured in 2002) regained the points lead after finishing third.

Manufacturers' Championship standings

	Pos	Manufacturer	Points
	1	Ford	52
1	2	Dodge	51
1	3	Chevrolet	49

- Note: Only the top five positions are included for the driver standings.

Previous race: 2004 Samsung/Radio Shack 500	Nextel Cup Series; 2004 season	Next race: 2004 Aaron's 499
