= 2008 Goody's Cool Orange 500 =

Race details
- Race 6 of 36 in the 2008 NASCAR Sprint Cup Series season
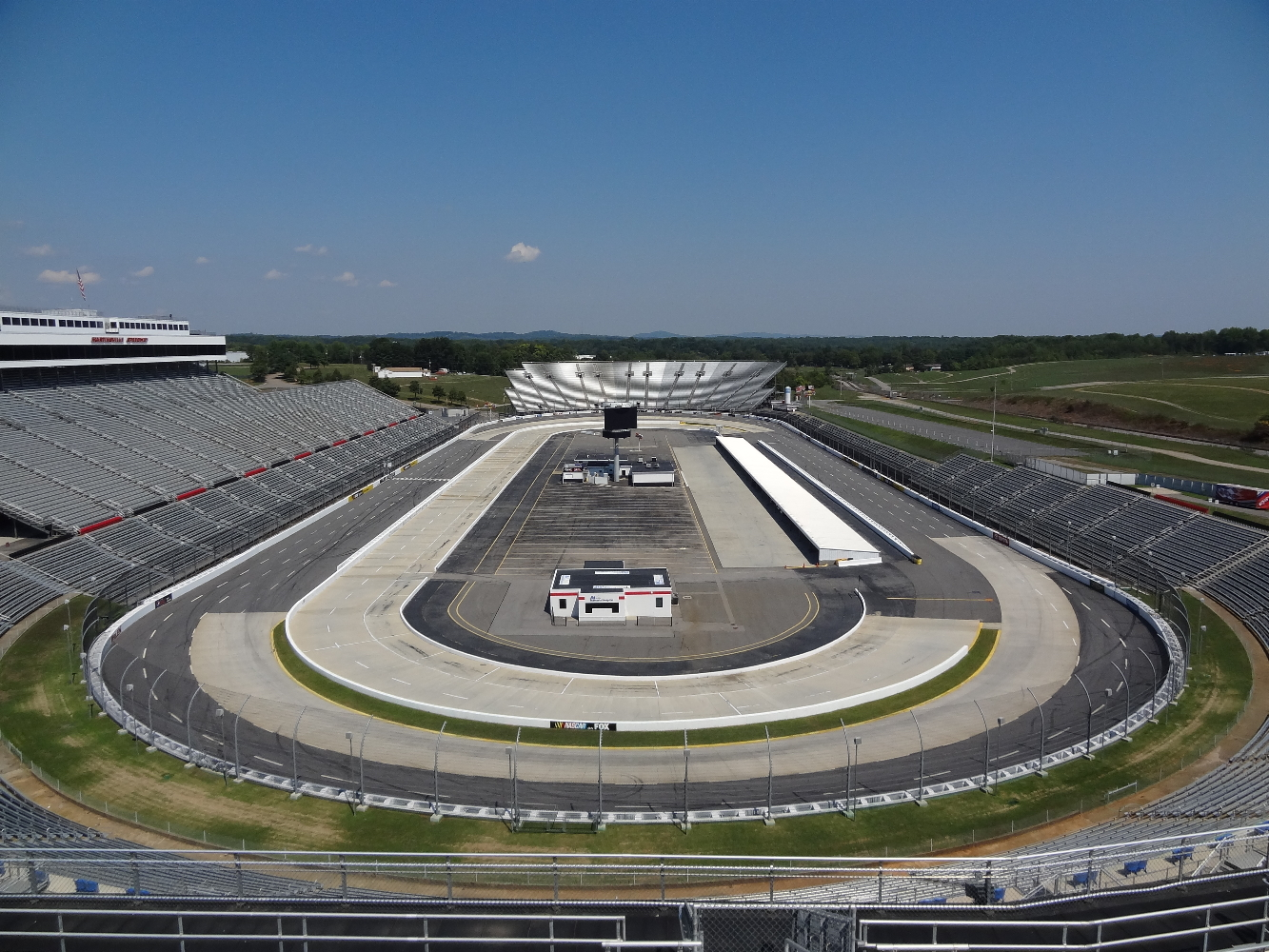
- View from turn one and two bleachers
- Date: March 30, 2008
- Location: Martinsville Speedway, Ridgeway, Virginia
- Course: Permanent racing facility
- Course length: 0.526 miles (0.847 km)
- Distance: 500 laps, 263 mi (423.257 km)
- Weather: Temperatures up to 46 °F (8 °C); wind speeds up to 11.1 miles per hour (17.9 km/h)
- Average speed: 73.163 miles per hour (117.744 km/h)

Pole position
Driver	Jeff Gordon	Hendrick Motorsports
- Time: 19.666

Most laps led
Driver	Dale Earnhardt Jr.	Hendrick Motorsports
- Laps: 146

Winner
No. 11	Denny Hamlin	Joe Gibbs Racing

Television in the United States
- Network: Fox Broadcasting Company
- Announcers: Mike Joy, Darrell Waltrip and Larry McReynolds

The 2008 Goody's Cool Orange 500 was the sixth race of the 2008 NASCAR Sprint Cup season, and was run on Sunday, March 30, 2008 at Martinsville Speedway in Martinsville, Virginia. This race aired on Fox starting at 1:30 PM US EDT and radio was handled by Motor Racing Network and Sirius Satellite Radio starting their programming at 1:15 PM US EDT. The race marked the start of the use of the 2008 Top 35 owners points exemption for each week's race for the 2008 season.

== Pre-Race News ==
- As announced, Michael McDowell will debut as the new driver of the #00 Michael Waltrip Racing Toyota Camry for David Reutimann, who moves to the team's #44 car for Dale Jarrett. Jarrett would drive the #44 one last time at the Sprint All-Star Race XXIV on May 17 in Concord, North Carolina. All three MWR teams are safely in the weekly Top 35 Owners Points exemption for this race.
- Bill Davis Racing's #27 team suspended operations due to a lack of sponsorship.
- BAM Racing has switched from Dodge to Toyota as of this week.

== Qualifying ==
Jeff Gordon won the pole for this race, the 65th in his career. Kyle Petty, who was outside the Top 35 exemption rule, failed to qualify for a race for the first time since the 2004 season.

=== Full qualifying results ===
RANK	DRIVER	NBR	CAR	TIME	SPEED	
1	Jeff Gordon	24	Chevrolet	19.666	96.288	
2	Denny Hamlin	11	Toyota	19.775	95.757	
3	Aric Almirola	8	Chevrolet	19.780	95.733	
4	David Ragan	6	Ford	19.814	95.569	
5	Jamie McMurray	26	Ford	19.830	95.492	*
6	Kasey Kahne	9	Dodge	19.831	95.487	
7	Ken Schrader	49	Toyota	19.836	95.463	*
8	Kyle Busch	18	Toyota	19.860	95.347	
9	Tony Stewart	20	Toyota	19.876	95.271	
10	Jimmie Johnson	48	Chevrolet	19.888	95.213	
11	Kevin Harvick	29	Chevrolet	19.889	95.208	
12	Clint Bowyer	07	Chevrolet	19.889	95.208	
13	Ryan Newman	12	Dodge	19.916	95.079	
14	Travis Kvapil	28	Ford	19.920	95.060	
15	David Reutimann	44	Toyota	19.925	95.036	
16	Michael Waltrip	55	Toyota	19.926	95.032	
17	Bill Elliott	21	Ford	19.943	94.951	*
18	Dave Blaney	22	Toyota	19.959	94.874	*
19	Greg Biffle	16	Ford	19.960	94.870	
20	Kurt Busch	2	Dodge	19.968	94.832	
21	David Gilliland	38	Ford	19.968	94.832	
22	Dale Earnhardt Jr.	88	Chevrolet	19.981	94.770	
23	J.J. Yeley	96	Toyota	19.993	94.713	
24	Jeff Burton	31	Chevrolet	20.009	94.637	
25	Elliott Sadler	19	Dodge	20.009	94.637	
26	Sam Hornish Jr.	77	Dodge	20.009	94.637	
27	Carl Edwards	99	Ford	20.017	94.600	
28	Matt Kenseth	17	Ford	20.018	94.595	
29	Juan Pablo Montoya	42	Dodge	20.018	94.595	
30	Mike Skinner	84	Toyota	20.025	94.562	*
31	Jeremy Mayfield	70	Chevrolet	20.029	94.543	
32	Bobby Labonte	43	Dodge	20.030	94.538	
33	Regan Smith	01	Chevrolet	20.041	94.486	*
34	Michael McDowell	00	Toyota	20.058	94.406	
35	Paul Menard	15	Chevrolet	20.066	94.369	
36	Scott Riggs	66	Chevrolet	20.078	94.312	
37	Patrick Carpentier	10	Dodge	20.081	94.298	*
38	Reed Sorenson	41	Dodge	20.115	94.139	
39	Dario Franchitti	40	Dodge	20.128	94.078	*
40	Kyle Petty	45	Dodge	20.128	94.078	*
41	Casey Mears	5	Chevrolet	20.152	93.966	
42	Brian Vickers	83	Toyota	20.217	93.664	
43	Robby Gordon	7	Dodge	20.222	93.641	OP
44	Martin Truex Jr.	1	Chevrolet	20.225	93.627	OP
45	John Andretti	34	Chevrolet	20.251	93.506	*
46	Tony Raines	08	Dodge	20.261	93.460	*
47	Joe Nemechek	78	Chevrolet	20.311	93.230	*

OP: qualified via owners points

PC: qualified as past champion

PR: provisional

QR: via qualifying race

* - had to qualify on time

== Results ==
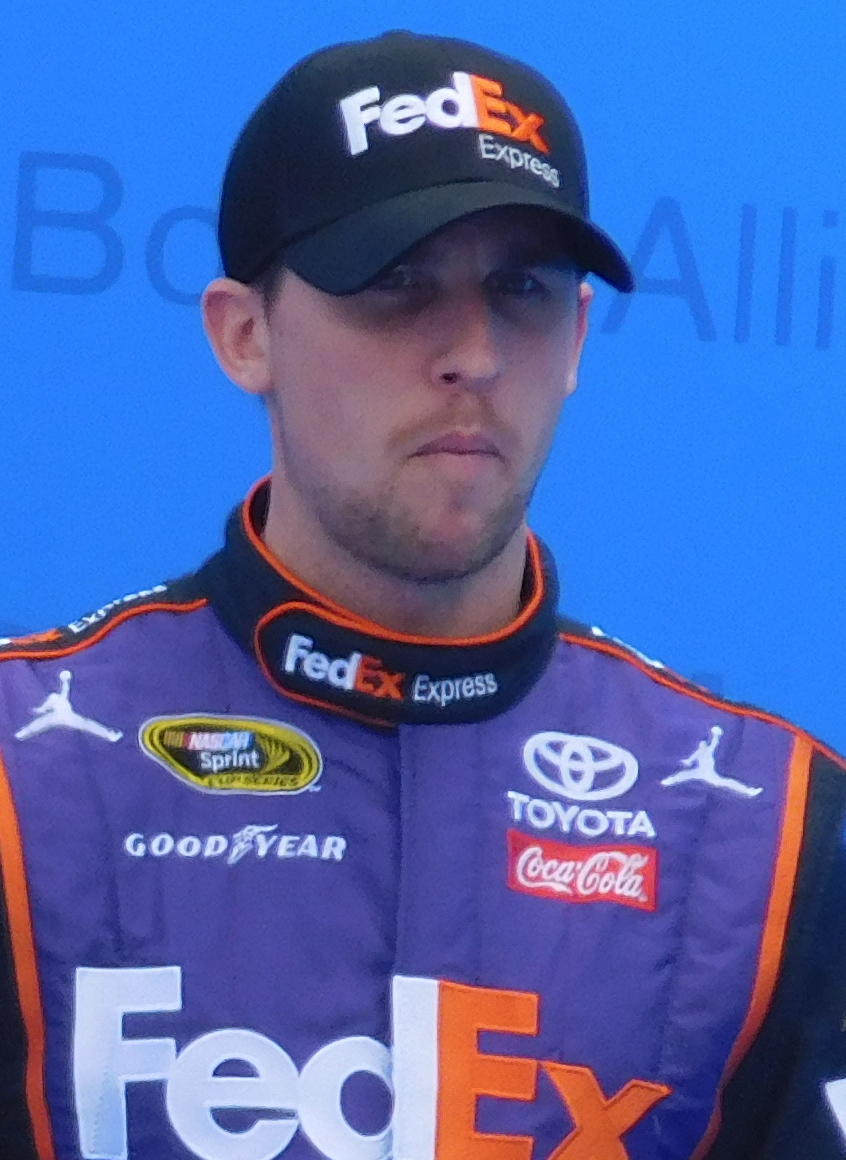
Denny Hamlin won the race.

POS	ST	#	DRIVER	SPONSOR / OWNER	CAR	LAPS	MONEY	STATUS	LED	PTS
1	2	11	Denny Hamlin	FedEx Freight (Joe Gibbs)	Toyota	500	207391	running	82	190
2	1	24	Jeff Gordon	DuPont (Rick Hendrick)	Chevrolet	500	159336	running	90	175
3	24	31	Jeff Burton	AT&T Mobility (Richard Childress)	Chevrolet	500	149308	running	37	170
4	10	48	Jimmie Johnson	Lowe's (Rick Hendrick)	Chevrolet	500	142861	running	135	165
5	9	20	Tony Stewart	Home Depot (Joe Gibbs)	Toyota	500	131236	running	0	155
6	22	88	Dale Earnhardt Jr.	AMP Energy / National Guard (Rick Hendrick)	Chevrolet	500	102850	running	146	160
7	39	5	Casey Mears	Kellogg's / Carquest (Rick Hendrick)	Chevrolet	500	99475	running	0	146
8	5	26	Jamie McMurray	Irwin Industrial Tools (Jack Roush)	Ford	500	91150	running	0	142
9	27	99	Carl Edwards	Claritin (Jack Roush)	Ford	500	123775	running	0	138
10	12	07	Clint Bowyer	BB&T (Richard Childress)	Chevrolet	500	97200	running	0	134
11	4	6	David Ragan	AAA Insurance (Jack Roush)	Ford	500	87200	running	0	130
12	11	29	Kevin Harvick	Shell / Pennzoil (Richard Childress)	Chevrolet	500	119961	running	0	127
13	29	42	Juan Pablo Montoya	Wrigley's Big Red (Chip Ganassi)	Dodge	500	105983	running	0	124
14	33	01	Regan Smith	DEI / Principal Financial Group (Dale Earnhardt, Inc.)	Chevrolet	500	86325	running	0	121
15	25	19	Elliott Sadler	McDonald's (Gillett Evernham Motorsports)	Dodge	500	104045	running	0	118
16	35	15	Paul Menard	Menards / Pittsburgh Paints (Dale Earnhardt, Inc.)	Chevrolet	500	84200	running	0	115
17	6	9	Kasey Kahne	Budweiser (Gillett Evernham Motorsports)	Dodge	500	105766	running	0	112
18	14	28	Travis Kvapil	Yates Racing (Yates Racing)	Ford	499	102764	running	0	109
19	13	12	Ryan Newman	Alltel (Roger Penske)	Dodge	499	118575	running	0	106
20	19	16	Greg Biffle	Jackson Hewitt (Jack Roush)	Ford	499	85175	running	0	103
21	42	1	Martin Truex Jr.	Bass Pro Shops / Tracker Boats (Dale Earnhardt, Inc.)	Chevrolet	499	105258	running	0	100
22	43	40	Dario Franchitti	Kennametal (Chip Ganassi)	Dodge	499	81925	running	0	97
23	40	83	Brian Vickers	Red Bull (Dietrich Mateschitz)	Toyota	497	73625	out of fuel	0	94
24	21	38	David Gilliland	FreeCreditReport.com (Yates Racing)	Ford	497	92433	running	0	91
25	32	43	Bobby Labonte	Cheerios / Betty Crocker (Petty Enterprises)	Dodge	497	110436	running	3	93
26	34	00	Michael McDowell	Aaron's Dream Machine (Michael Waltrip)	Toyota	497	88808	running	0	85
27	23	96	J.J. Yeley	DLP HDTV / Queen City Electronics (Jeff Moorad)	Toyota	497	80425	running	0	82
28	26	77	Sam Hornish Jr.	Mobil 1 (Roger Penske)	Dodge	497	114800	running	0	79
29	37	10	Patrick Carpentier	Charter Communications (Gillett Evernham Motorsports)	Dodge	497	71550	running	0	76
30	28	17	Matt Kenseth	DeWalt (Jack Roush)	Ford	496	117066	running	0	73
31	30	84	Mike Skinner	Red Bull (Dietrich Mateschitz)	Toyota	496	68775	running	0	70
32	31	70	Jeremy Mayfield	Haas Automation (Gene Haas)	Chevrolet	495	68625	running	0	67
33	20	2	Kurt Busch	Miller Lite (Roger Penske)	Dodge	493	68400	running	0	64
34	17	21	Bill Elliott	Little Debbie Snack Cakes (Wood Brothers)	Ford	492	87570	running	0	61
35	16	55	Michael Waltrip	NAPA Auto Parts (Michael Waltrip)	Toyota	483	82383	running	0	58
36	38	41	Reed Sorenson	Target / Polaroid (Chip Ganassi)	Dodge	471	95389	running	0	55
37	7	49	Ken Schrader	Microsoft Small Business (Beth Ann Morgenthau)	Toyota	467	79758	running	0	52
38	8	18	Kyle Busch	M&M's (Joe Gibbs)	Toyota	443	86050	running	0	49
39	15	44	David Reutimann	UPS (Michael Waltrip)	Toyota	441	68000	rear end	3	51
40	41	7	Robby Gordon	Charter Communications (Robby Gordon)	Dodge	440	85472	running	0	43
41	36	66	Scott Riggs	State Water Heaters (Gene Haas)	Chevrolet	420	67875	running	0	40
42	3	8	Aric Almirola	U.S. Army (Dale Earnhardt, Inc.)	Chevrolet	379	102973	engine	0	37
43	18	22	Dave Blaney	Caterpillar (Bill Davis)	Toyota	374	67246	engine	4	39
Failed to qualify
POS	NAME	NBR	SPONSOR	OWNER	CAR					
44	Kyle Petty	45	Marathon American Spirit Motor Oil	Petty Enterprises	Dodge					
45	John Andretti	34	Front Row Motorsports	Bob Jenkins	Chevrolet					
46	Tony Raines	08	Rhino's Energy Drink	John Carter	Dodge					
47	Joe Nemechek	78	Furniture Row / DenverMattress.com	Barney Visser	Chevrolet					

Failed to qualify: Kyle Petty (#45), Tony Raines (#08), John Andretti (#34), Joe Nemechek (#78).

Previous race: 2008 Food City 500	Sprint Cup Series; 2008 season	Next race: 2008 Samsung 500
