= 2008 Checker O'Reilly Auto Parts 500 =

2008 Checker O'Reilly Auto Parts 500 Presented by Pennzoil
Race details
- Race 35 of 36 in the 2008 NASCAR Sprint Cup Series
- Date: November 9, 2008
- Official name: Checker O'Reilly Auto Parts 500
- Location: Phoenix International Raceway, Avondale, Arizona
- Course: Permanent racing facility
- Course length: 1.000 miles (1.609 km)
- Distance: 313 laps, 313 mi (503.724 km)
- Scheduled distance: 312 laps, 312 mi (502.115 km)
- Weather: Temperatures reaching up to 81 °F (27 °C); wind speeds up to 22 miles per hour (35 km/h)
- Average speed: 97.804 miles per hour (157.400 km/h)

Pole position
Driver	Jimmie Johnson	Hendrick Motorsports
- Time: 26.721

Most laps led
Driver	Jimmie Johnson	Hendrick Motorsports
- Laps: 217

Winner
No. 48	Jimmie Johnson	Hendrick Motorsports

Television in the United States
- Network: ABC/ESPN2
- Announcers: Jerry Punch, Dale Jarrett, and Andy Petree

The 2008 Checker O'Reilly Auto Parts 500 Presented by Pennzoil was the penultimate race of the 2008 NASCAR Sprint Cup season and the 2008 Chase for the Sprint Cup. To date, it is the final career race for Kyle Petty.

== Summary ==
The 312-lap, 500 kilometres (310 mi) event on the 1 mile (1.6 km) circuit was held on November 9 at Phoenix International Raceway in the Phoenix, Arizona, suburb of Avondale. ABC broadcast the race on television beginning at 3 pm US EST while MRN along with Sirius Satellite Radio had radio coverage starting at 2:45 pm US EST.

=== Qualifying ===
Jimmie Johnson won the Pole for Sunday's race, while the man closest to him, Carl Edwards starts fifth.

=== Recap ===
In a race delayed by rain for almost half an hour, then held up another twenty minutes due to a major accident, Johnson all but clinched the 2008 Sprint Cup Championship, his third in a row. Also, a second major accident happened at the end of the race. When the field came to the finish line to take the checkered flag, Matt Kenseth, knocked A. J. Allmendinger into Juan Pablo Montoya. As Kenseth continued to a 15th-place finish, Allmendinger & Montoya became hooked together, slid across the line & hit the inside wall, sending Montoya spinning back across traffic, collecting, Tony Stewart, Robby Gordon, Bill Elliott, Ken Schrader & others. Nevertheless, Allmendinger managed slide across the line to finish 16th, get his car back straight & move on, while Montoya also slid across the line & finish 17th. However, he lost his back-end bumper cover & his car came to rest against the fence.

=== Lap 284: ESPN's Heidi Game Ruse ===
Viewers in the Eastern and Central Time Zones of the USA were forced to switch from ABC to ESPN2 to see the finish of the race on Lap 284 as the network broadcast America's Funniest Home Videos at 7:30 pm EST, while ABC continued the race to its conclusion (313 laps) in the Mountain and Pacific Time Zones. NASCAR Chairman Brian France was enraged by this decision:

We didn't like [ABC's call], that was not what we had anticipated but we have talked to them [in the days following the race]. There were lots of circumstances that we have to consider, [and ABC] had their own issues to manage around. Unfortunately, we got the short end of that. They did not like the idea of having to pull out of ABC and operate the way they did [November 9, 2008]. It is imperative that [NASCAR and their television partners Fox, TNT and ESPN] work closely together with [each other] for scheduling.

-Interview with Associated Press on November 11th, 2008.

Other broadcast networks since 2001 (when the national television contracts took place) had previously broadcast races to the conclusion, even in rain delay cases. The 2002 UAW-GM Quality 500 at Lowe's Motor Speedway, the 2005 Aaron's 312 (NNS) at Talladega Superspeedway, and the 2005 Pepsi 400 at Daytona International Speedway each ran late past network hours and were retained on the broadcast network until their conclusions. ESPN, on the other hand, pulled a similar "Heidi Game" rule at the 2007 LifeLock 400 at the Kansas Speedway.

Both Phoenix races during the 2008 season had incidents with other events. During the spring race, the broadcast started when the cars were in the dogleg of the first lap. And 20 years ago during the first Cup race at Phoenix, ESPN joined the race after 30 laps had been completed.
