= 2003 Subway 400 =

Second stock car race of the 2003 NASCAR Winston Cup Series

Race details
- Race 2 of 36 in the 2003 NASCAR Winston Cup Series
- Layout of North Carolina Speedway
- Date: February 23, 2003
- Location: Rockingham, North Carolina
- Course: North Carolina Speedway
- Course length: 1.017 miles (1.637 km)
- Distance: 393 laps, 399.681 mi (643.224 km)
- Average speed: 117.852 mph (189.664 km/h)
- Attendance: 40,000

Pole position
Driver	Dave Blaney	Jasper Motorsports
- Time: 23.669

Most laps led
Driver	Rusty Wallace	Penske Racing
- Laps: 182

Winner
No. 88	Dale Jarrett	Robert Yates Racing

Television in the United States
- Network: Fox Broadcasting Company
- Announcers: Mike Joy, Darrell Waltrip, Larry McReynolds
- Nielsen ratings: 6.3/13 (Overnight)

The 2003 Subway 400 was the second stock car race of the 2003 NASCAR Winston Cup Series. It was held on February 23, in Rockingham, North Carolina at North Carolina Speedway. 40,000 spectators attended the event. Robert Yates Racing driver Dale Jarrett won the 393-lap race starting from 9th-place. Roush Racing teammates Kurt Busch and Matt Kenseth finished 2nd and 3rd, respectively.

Dave Blaney won the first pole position of his career by posting the fastest lap in qualifying. He led the first eight laps before Mark Martin passed him on lap nine. Ricky Craven took the lead eight laps later, which he lost to Rusty Wallace on lap 27. Wallace led four times for a total of 182 laps, more than any other driver. On lap 220, Busch became the leader, holding the position for a total of four times over 149 laps. He was passed by Jarrett on the 384th lap. Busch retook the position five laps later before Jarrett reclaimed first place on lap 390. He maintained it for the rest of the race to win. There were seven yellow caution flags and twenty lead changes among eleven different drivers.

It was Jarrett's second victory at North Carolina Speedway, and the 31st of his career. The result advanced him from 10th to 2nd in the Drivers' Championship, 31 points behind Busch. The latter took the points lead after Michael Waltrip finished in 19th place; this dropped Waltrip to fifth, 15 points behind Martin. The lead of the Manufacturers' Championship changed from Chevrolet to Ford. Pontiac passed Dodge for third with 34 races left in the season.

== Background ==
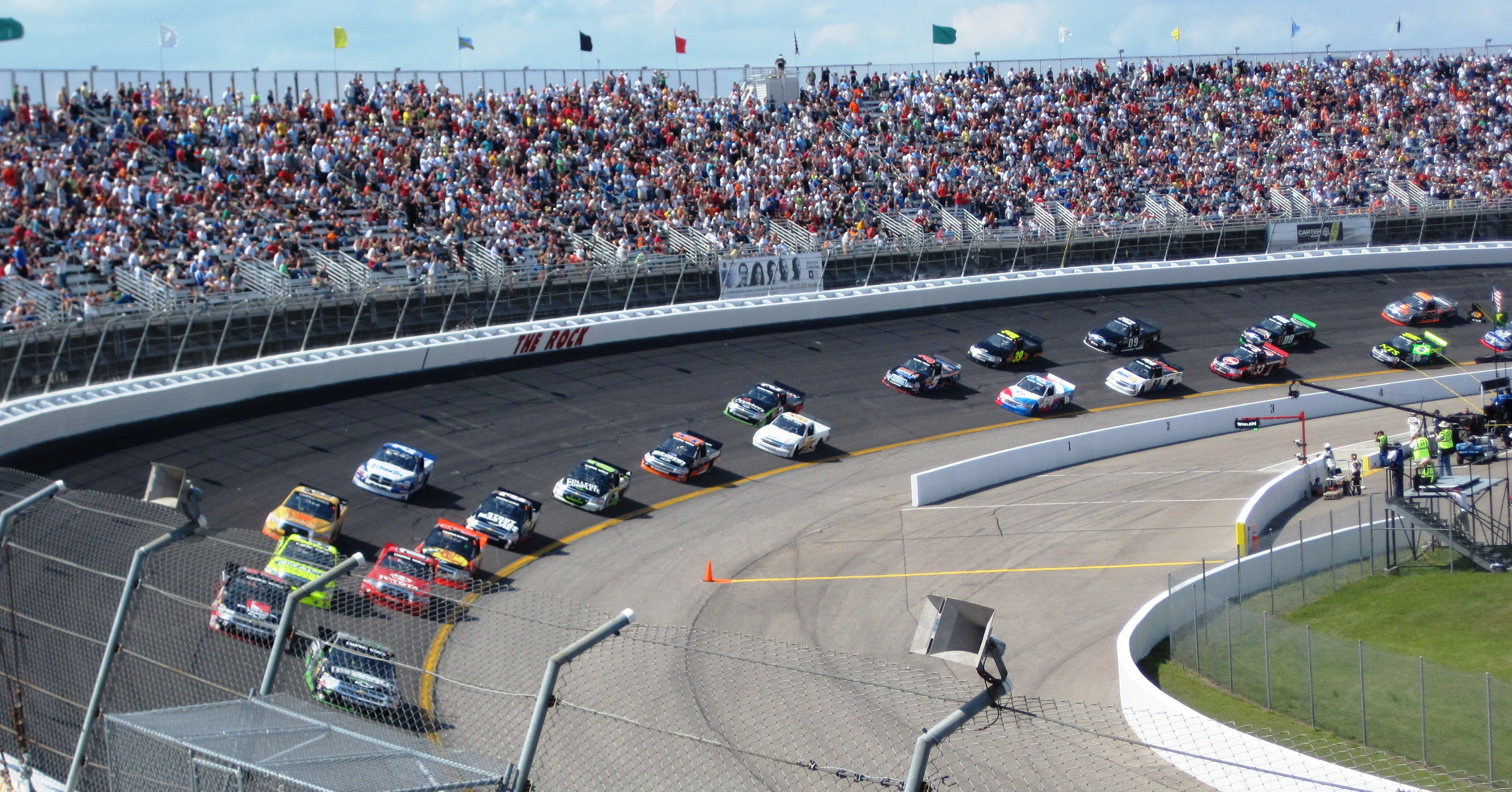
North Carolina Speedway (pictured in 2012), where the race was held

The 2003 Subway 400 was the second of thirty-six scheduled stock car races of the 2003 NASCAR Winston Cup Series. It was held on February 23, in Rockingham, North Carolina, at North Carolina Speedway. The Winston Cup Series first came to North Carolina Speedway late in the 1965 season and it hosted two events on the series calendar. The track at North Carolina Speedway is a 1.017 mi (1.637 km) four-turn D-shaped oval. Its turns are banked between 22 and 25 degrees; both the front stretch and the back stretch are banked at eight degrees.

Before the race, Michael Waltrip led the Drivers' Championship with 185 points, with Kurt Busch in second place with 170 points. Jimmie Johnson and Kevin Harvick were third and fourth with 170 and 160 points respectively. Mark Martin in fifth had 155 points. Rounding out the top ten were Tony Stewart, Robby Gordon, Jeremy Mayfield, Mike Wallace, and Dale Jarrett. In the Manufacturers' Championship, Chevrolet led with nine points, three points ahead of Ford in the second position. Third-placed Dodge, with four points, was one point ahead of Pontiac in fourth. Matt Kenseth was the race's defending champion.

The Subway 400 was the first round of the 2003 season to be held without the use of restrictor plates. NASCAR retained a regulation it instituted at the season-opening Daytona 500 held one week earlier. A race slowed by a yellow caution flag with five or fewer laps to run would not recommence.

== Practice and qualifying ==
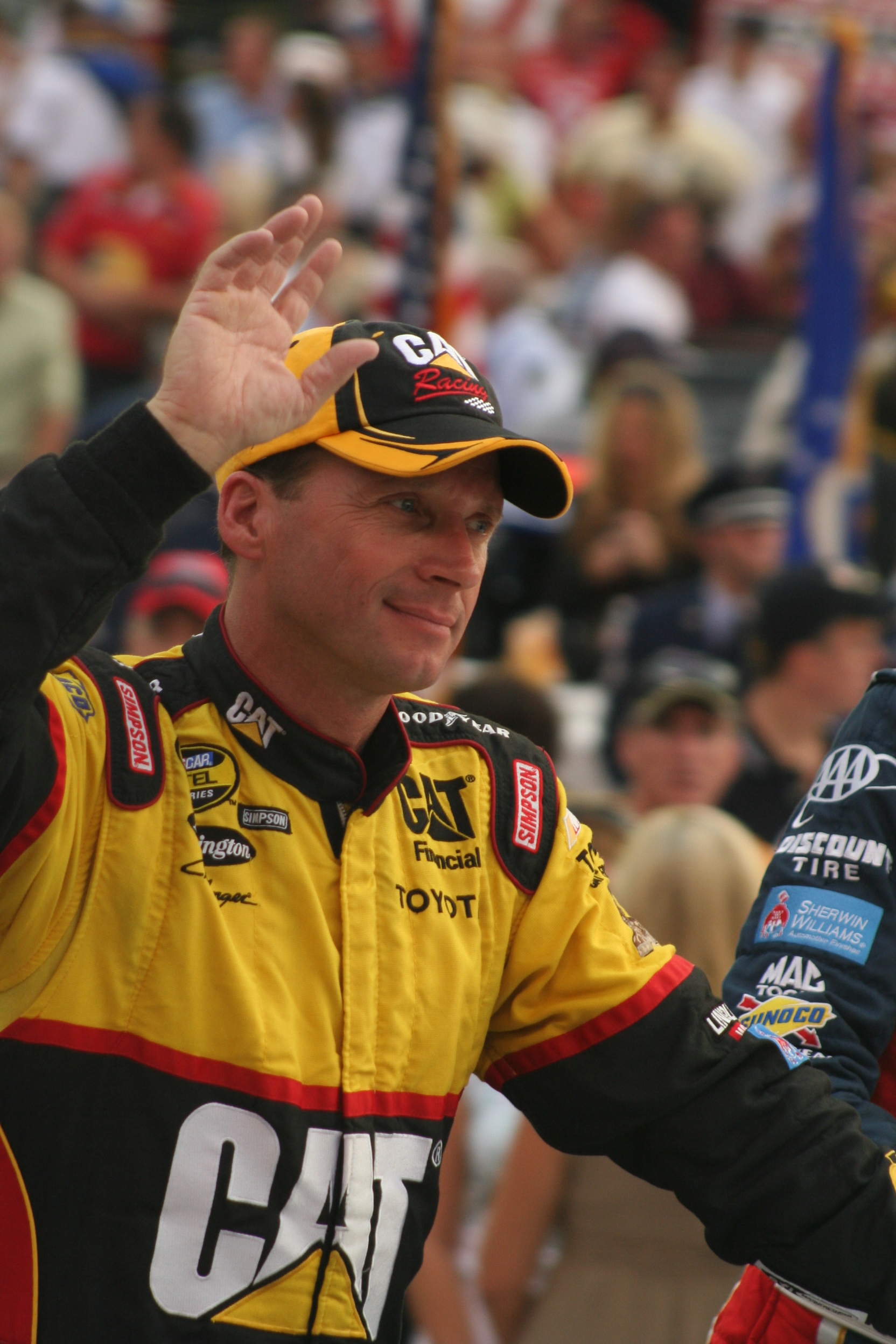
Dave Blaney (pictured in 2007) had the first pole position of his career.

Three practice sessions were scheduled before the Sunday race—one on Friday and two on Saturday. The first session lasted 120 minutes, and the final two sessions were due to run for 45 and 40 minutes, respectively. Wind, rain and a tornado alert cancelled the Saturday morning practice sessions. In the first practice session, Ryan Newman was the fastest driver with a lap of 23.525 seconds. Ken Schrader, Joe Nemechek, Martin, Busch, Jerry Nadeau, Mike Skinner, Ward Burton, Mayfield and Jamie McMurray were in positions two to ten. A forecast of rain later on Friday caused teams to concentrate on race setup during practice.

A total of 43 drivers entered the qualifying session on Friday afternoon. Each driver ran two timed laps to determine pole position to 36th. The remainder of the field qualified through the use of provisionals. Rain delayed qualifying for an hour and 15 minutes; because some teams concentrated on car setups, it created a mixed starting order. In his 113th race, Dave Blaney took his first career pole position, with a time of 23.669 seconds, and Jasper Motorsports' first since the 1994 season. He was joined on the grid's front row by Johnny Benson Jr., who was two-hundredths of a second slower. Martin qualified third, Sterling Marlin fourth, and Bill Elliott fifth. Ricky Craven, McMurray, Wallace, Dale Jarrett and Bobby Labonte rounded out the top ten qualifiers.

During the session, a fuel line detached from Newman's carburetor on his first lap. Nadeau lost control of his car during his second lap. Jeff Burton set no qualifying lap due to a pirouette after he spun his rear tires, and had an accident against a barrier. Once qualifying had concluded, Blaney said, "This was a new type of car and we hadn't done any testing with it. We didn't know what to expect. But it was really good from the start. Winning the pole only made it better."

=== Qualifying results ===
Grid	Car	Driver	Team	Manufacturer	Time	Speed
1	77	Dave Blaney	Jasper Motorsports	Ford	23.669	154.683
2	10	Johnny Benson Jr.	MBV Motorsports	Pontiac	23.689	154.553
3	6	Mark Martin	Roush Racing	Ford	23.708	154.429
4	40	Sterling Marlin	Chip Ganassi Racing	Dodge	23.709	154.422
5	9	Bill Elliott	Evernham Motorsports	Dodge	23.710	154.416
6	32	Ricky Craven	PPI Motorsports	Pontiac	23.716	154.377
7	42	Jamie McMurray	Chip Ganassi Racing	Dodge	23.731	154.279
8	2	Rusty Wallace	Penske Racing	Dodge	23.743	152.201
9	88	Dale Jarrett	Robert Yates Racing	Ford	23.746	154.182
10	18	Bobby Labonte	Joe Gibbs Racing	Chevrolet	23.767	154.046
11	38	Elliott Sadler	Robert Yates Racing	Ford	23.768	154.039
12	8	Dale Earnhardt Jr.	Dale Earnhardt, Inc.	Chevrolet	23.769	154.033
13	16	Greg Biffle	Roush Racing	Ford	23.787	153.916
14	25	Joe Nemechek	Hendrick Motorsports	Chevrolet	23.792	153.884
15	22	Ward Burton	Bill Davis Racing	Dodge	23.802	153.819
16	41	Casey Mears	Chip Ganassi Racing	Dodge	23.821	153.696
17	23	Kenny Wallace	Bill Davis Racing	Dodge	23.823	153.683
18	17	Matt Kenseth	Roush Racing	Ford	23.845	153.542
19	31	Robby Gordon	Richard Childress Racing	Chevrolet	23.850	153.509
20	4	Mike Skinner	Morgan-McClure Motorsports	Pontiac	23.856	153.471
21	12	Ryan Newman	Penske Racing	Dodge	23.861	153.439
22	15	Michael Waltrip	Dale Earnhardt, Inc.	Chevrolet	23.877	153.336
23	24	Jeff Gordon	Hendrick Motorsports	Chevrolet	23.881	153.310
24	01	Jerry Nadeau	MB2 Motorsports	Pontiac	23.924	153.035
25	1	Steve Park	Dale Earnhardt, Inc.	Chevrolet	23.926	153.022
26	29	Kevin Harvick	Richard Childress Racing	Chevrolet	23.936	152.958
27	97	Kurt Busch	Roush Racing	Ford	23.940	152.932
28	21	Ricky Rudd	Wood Brothers Racing	Ford	23.959	152.811
29	19	Jeremy Mayfield	Evernham Motorsports	Dodge	23.961	152.798
30	45	Kyle Petty	Petty Enterprises	Dodge	23.962	152.792
31	5	Terry Labonte	Hendrick Motorsports	Chevrolet	23.968	152.754
32	43	John Andretti	Petty Enterprises	Dodge	23.972	152.728
33	20	Tony Stewart	Joe Gibbs Racing	Chevrolet	23.974	152.715
34	0	Jack Sprague	Haas CNC Racing	Pontiac	23.990	152.614
35	49	Ken Schrader	BAM Racing	Dodge	23.991	152.602
36	7	Jimmy Spencer	Ultra Motorsports	Dodge	23.999	152.556
37	48	Jimmie Johnson	Hendrick Motorsports	Chevrolet	Provisional	
38	99	Jeff Burton	Roush Racing	Ford	Provisional	
39	30	Jeff Green	Richard Childress Racing	Chevrolet	Provisional	
40	54	Todd Bodine	BelCar Motorsports	Ford	Provisional	
41	14	Larry Foyt	A. J. Foyt Racing	Dodge	Provisional	
42	74	Tony Raines	BACE Motorsports	Chevrolet	Provisional	
43	37	Derrike Cope	Quest Motor Racing	Chevrolet	Provisional	

== Race ==
The 393-lap race commenced at 1:00 p.m. Eastern Standard Time, and was televised live in the United States on Fox. Around the start of the race, weather conditions were sunny and cold with blustery winds; the ambient temperature ranged between 54–55 °F (12–13 °C) and the track temperature at 78 °F (26 °C). Jim Ritter, pastor of the Marston Baptist Church in Marston, North Carolina, began pre-race ceremonies with an invocation. Members of the ECU and the Carolina Marching Band performed the national anthem, and the race's sponsor spokesperson Clay Henry commanded the drivers to start their engines. Jet dryers were deployed to clean the track and remove paper debris. NASCAR announced a competition caution would occur on lap 45 due to the previous day's rainfall, meaning drivers would be required to make mandatory pit stops to evaluate their car's performance.

Rusty Wallace (pictured in 1998) led the most laps of any driver with 182.

Blaney led the opening eight laps before Martin passed him on the ninth lap. Jeff Gordon made contact with Dale Earnhardt Jr.'s car on the 12th lap, pushing a chunk of sheet metal into Earnhardt's front-left tire, and causing it to rub onto it. On lap 17, Craven passed Martin to take the lead. McMurray and Nemechek made contact with each other around the 23rd lap, causing the latter's right front fender to detach, possibly from the collision. Craven lost the first position to Rusty Wallace on the 27th lap. Six laps later, Tony Raines cut a tire and collided with a wall; series officials did not wave a yellow caution flag. It later came on the 44th lap as Earnhardt's left-rear tire burst. During the caution, Earnhardt made five pit stops since his vehicle had a rubber strip lodged in its front left rotor and possibly the suspension. Additionally, Gordon damaged his car's right-front corner against the pit barrier. Rusty Wallace continued to lead the field at the lap 55 restart. Todd Bodine cut his right front tire on lap 88, and collided with a barrier exiting turn two, bringing out the second caution.

The caution remained out for five laps. Kyle Petty and Martin led one and three laps, respectively. Rusty Wallace led the field back to racing speeds at the restart on the 93rd lap. On lap 107, Jack Sprague hit the rear of Kenny Wallace's vehicle leaving the second turn. Kenny Wallace spun towards the outside pit road wall, and damaged the right front of his car, prompting the third caution. The five-lap caution had Rusty Wallace retain the first position; he continued to pace the field as Earnhardt, on lap 122, hit the left rear of Nadeau's vehicle and caused the latter to spin. Mayfield slowed in response and John Andretti struck his car, triggering the fourth caution. Martin led from the 124th to 126th laps. Green flag racing resumed on the 127th lap with Rusty Wallace leading; he maintained it for the next 48 laps. A fifth caution came out when Earnhardt spun on lap 174; Stewart hit the rear of Petty's slower car, causing damage to both of Stewart's front fenders.

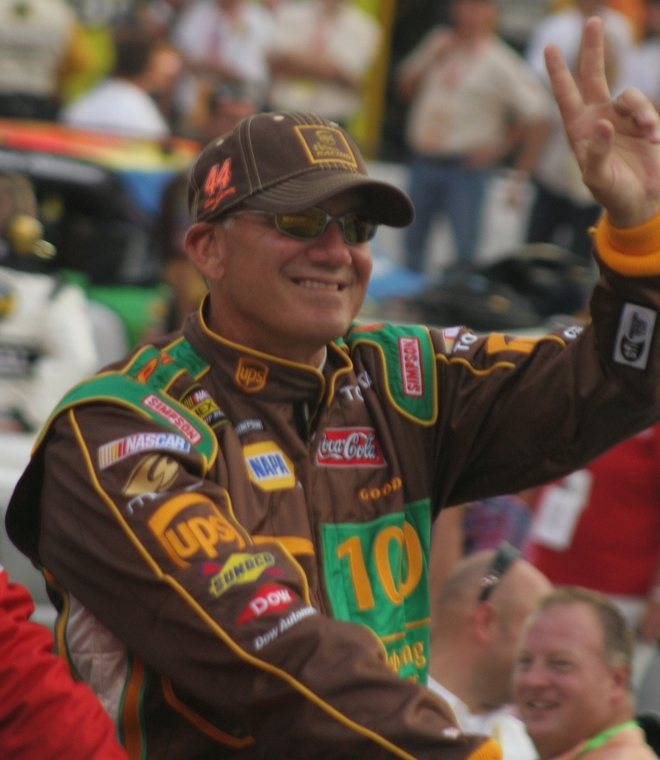
Dale Jarrett took his 31st career victory and his second at North Carolina Speedway.

Martin took the lead on lap 175 and held it at the resumption of racing on lap 178. Rusty Wallace overtook Martin for first place on lap 179. Busch passed Rusty Wallace for the first position on the 220th lap. During laps 240 and 252, several teams elected to make green-flag pit stops. Busch maintained the first position during this period and at the lap 253 restart. Kenseth took the lead on lap 255. He held it until Marlin took the position and led laps 258 to 260 before Busch returned to first place. On lap 275, the sixth caution came out as Earnhardt spun again. Mayfield was possibly hit by Jeff Burton and stalled after contact with a wall. Kurt Busch maintained the first position at the lap 292 restart and the next seven laps.

On lap 298, Gordon hit the rear of Earnhardt's car, sending him spinning into the frontstretch grass, and causing the final caution. The majority of drivers made pit stops during the caution. Labonte moved into the lead on lap 300 and led at the lap 303 restart. Jeff Burton passed Labonte to assume the lead on the next lap. Six laps later, Busch got ahead of Jeff Burton to retake the first position. During the last 30 laps, Busch and second-placed Jarrett negotiated slower traffic, as Busch led for much of that period in time and Jarrett was close by him. On lap 383, Jarrett drew alongside Busch and provided him with little space between his car and the backstretch wall. Busch lost control of his car and Jarrett advanced to first place on the 384th lap. Jarrett was delayed by Sprague's lapped car on lap 387. Busch then overtook Jarrett to move into first place on the outside two laps later.

Jarrett retook the lead on lap 390, making the pass on the approach to turn four. Busch was unable to continue the challenge for the victory because he had worn out his rear tires in the process. Jarrett held the first position through slower traffic during the last four laps to claim his second win at North Carolina Speedway, and the 31st of his career. This extended Jarrett's run of winning at least one race every year to eleven. Busch finished second, Kenseth third, Craven fourth, and McMurray fifth. Rusty Wallace, Martin, Johnson, Elliott Sadler and Blaney rounded out the top ten finishers. There were a total of seven yellow caution flags, lasting a cumulative total of 46 laps. There were 20 lead changes; 11 drivers lead at least one lap during the race. Rusty Wallace's 182 laps lead was the most of any competitor. Jarrett led twice for a total of nine laps.

=== Post-race ===
Jarrett appeared in Victory Lane to celebrate his 31st career win in front of the crowd of 40,000 people; the win earned him $167,050. Sadler tested at the track beforehand and provided Jarrett with a suspension setup for his teammate's car. Jarrett's crew chief Brad Parrott stated the close collaboration between the two would help Robert Yates Racing achieve more success during the year. Jarrett also dedicated the victory to the "older generation" and said he was confident he could challenge them, "Those [young] guys are really talented and are getting some well-deserved attention. But [the veterans are] giving them a race, and I think that we can." Busch commented on his second consecutive second-place finish of 2003: "This one is much more difficult to swallow than the [Daytona] race. We had a great run today. I'm real upset we didn't win. I would have loved to have gotten off to Victory Lane so early in the year." Third-placed Kenseth said he was happy with the work his team put in for the event and hailed his car's performance, "I'm real happy finishing third. I think we had a car that definitely could have contended for the win, we were just a little too far behind on the last restart and was a little too loose that last run to be able to get up there, but it was a great day for us."

Rusty Wallace described his car as "a damn bullet" when he was leading and said, "About three-quarters of the way through the race, I could see the track getting real black. I had the thing really turning good. It just got too free on me. It got so loose you could hardly touch the throttle." Earnhardt said he acknowledged Jeff Gordon's car hitting him was unintentional; he described his car's handling afterward as causing tire damage and rubbing that caused its failure, "The car would just get loose, really loose. It would just snap out from under me, and that's why I spun a couple of times. It felt to me like it was going to crash or spin out on every lap." McMurray said he believed his fifth-place result increased his confidence with his crew chief Donnie Wingo, "I think it makes me feel good. I had to work with three crew chiefs last year. Coming in I didn't even know Donnie (Wingo). I was a little bit nervous about that, and (journalists) would just tear me up if I didn't do well."

The result promoted Busch to the lead of the Drivers' Championship with 345 points. Jarrett's victory advanced him from tenth to second as he had a total of 314 points. Johnson maintained the third position with 312 points, as Martin moved to fourth with 306 points. Waltrip dropped to fifth, and Kenseth stood in sixth place. Burton, Craven, Stewart were seventh to ninth. Harvick, Rusty Wallace, and Rudd tied for tenth position. In the Manufacturers' Championship, Ford took the lead with 15 points, three points ahead of Chevrolet in the second position. Pontiac, with nine points, was one point in front of Dodge in fourth place with thirty-four races left in the season. The race took three hours, 23 minutes and 29 seconds to complete, and the margin of victory was 0.966 seconds.

=== Race results ===
Pos	Car	Driver	Team	Manufacturer	Laps	Points
1	88	Dale Jarrett	Robert Yates Racing	Ford	393	180^{1}
2	97	Kurt Busch	Roush Racing	Ford	393	175^{1}
3	17	Matt Kenseth	Roush Racing	Ford	393	170^{1}
4	32	Ricky Craven	PPI Motorsports	Pontiac	393	165^{1}
5	42	Jamie McMuray	Chip Ganassi Racing	Dodge	393	155
6	2	Rusty Wallace	Penske Racing	Dodge	393	160^{2}
7	6	Mark Martin	Roush Racing	Ford	393	151^{1}
8	48	Jimmie Johnson	Hendrick Motorsports	Chevrolet	393	142
9	38	Elliott Sadler	Robert Yates Racing	Ford	393	138
10	77	Dave Blaney	Jasper Motorsports	Ford	393	139^{1}
11	21	Ricky Rudd	Wood Brothers Racing	Ford	393	130
12	99	Jeff Burton	Roush Racing	Ford	392	132^{1}
13	10	Johnny Benson Jr.	MBV Motorsports	Pontiac	392	124
14	12	Ryan Newman	Penske Racing	Dodge	392	121
15	24	Jeff Gordon	Hendrick Motorsports	Chevrolet	392	118
16	18	Bobby Labonte	Joe Gibbs Racing	Chevrolet	392	120^{1}
17	4	Mike Skinner	Morgan-McClure Motorsports	Pontiac	392	112
18	22	Ward Burton	Bill Davis Racing	Dodge	392	109
19	15	Michael Waltrip	Dale Earnhardt, Inc.	Chevrolet	392	106
20	20	Tony Stewart	Joe Gibbs Racing	Chevrolet	392	103
21	1	Steve Park	Dale Earnhardt, Inc.	Chevrolet	392	100
22	16	Greg Biffle	Roush Racing	Ford	392	97
23	25	Joe Nemechek	Hendrick Motorsports	Chevrolet	392	94
24	49	Ken Schrader	BAM Racing	Dodge	392	91
25	29	Kevin Harvick	Richard Childress Racing	Chevrolet	391	88
26	01	Jerry Nadeau	MB2 Motorsports	Pontiac	391	85
27	5	Terry Labonte	Hendrick Motorsports	Chevrolet	391	82
28	7	Jimmy Spencer	Ultra Motorsports	Dodge	391	79
29	31	Robby Gordon	Richard Childress Racing	Chevrolet	391	76
30	41	Casey Mears	Chip Ganassi Racing	Dodge	390	73
31	30	Jeff Green	Richard Childress Racing	Chevrolet	390	70
32	9	Bill Elliott	Evernham Motorsports	Dodge	390	67
33	8	Dale Earnhardt Jr.	Dale Earnhardt, Inc.	Chevrolet	390	64
34	0	Jack Sprague	Haas CNC Racing	Pontiac	390	61
35	45	Kyle Petty	Petty Enterprises	Dodge	389	63^{1}
36	14	Larry Foyt	A. J. Foyt Racing	Dodge	388	55
37	74	Tony Raines	BACE Motorsports	Chevrolet	387	52
38	23	Kenny Wallace	Bill Davis Racing	Dodge	386	49
39	43	John Andretti	Petty Enterprises	Dodge	347	46
40	40	Sterling Marlin	Chip Ganassi Racing	Dodge	319	48^{1}
41	19	Jeremy Mayfield	Evernham Motorsports	Dodge	271	40
42	54	Todd Bodine	BelCar Motorsports	Ford	85	37
43	37	Derrike Cope	Quest Motor Racing	Chevrolet	34	34
^{1} Includes five bonus points for leading a lap^{2} Includes ten bonus points for leading the most laps

== Standings after the race ==
Drivers' Championship standings
Rank	+/–	Driver	Points
1	1	Kurt Busch	345
2	8	Dale Jarrett	314 (−31)
3		Jimmie Johnson	312 (−33)
4	1	Mark Martin	306 (−39)
5	4	Michael Waltrip	291 (−54)
6	13	Matt Kenseth	278 (−67)
7	4	Jeff Burton	262 (−83)
8	17	Ricky Craven	255 (−90)
9	3	Tony Stewart	254 (−91)
10	6	Kevin Harvick	248 (−97)
10	16	Rusty Wallace	248 (−97)
10	5	Ricky Rudd	248 (−97)

Manufacturers' Championship standings
Rank	+/–	Manufacturer	Points
1	1	Ford	15
2	1	Chevrolet	12 (−3)
3	1	Pontiac	9 (−6)
4	1	Dodge	8 (−7)

- Note: Only the top ten positions are included for the driver standings.

Previous race: 2003 Daytona 500	Winston Cup Series; 2003 season	Next race: 2003 UAW-DaimlerChrysler 400
