= 2003 Bass Pro Shops MBNA 500 (March) =

Fourth race of the 2003 NASCAR Winston Cup Series

Race details
- Race 4 of 36 in the 2003 NASCAR Winston Cup Series
- The 2003 Bass Pro Shops MBNA 500 program cover, with artwork by NASCAR artist Sam Bass.
- Date: March 9, 2003
- Official name: 45th Annual Bass Pro Shops MBNA 500
- Location: Hampton, Georgia, Atlanta Motor Speedway
- Course: Permanent racing facility
- Course length: 1.54 miles (2.48 km)
- Distance: 325 laps, 500.5 mi (805.476 km)
- Scheduled distance: 325 laps, 500.5 mi (805.476 km)
- Average speed: 146.048 miles per hour (235.041 km/h)
- Attendance: 106,000

Pole position
Driver	Ryan Newman	Penske Racing
- Time: 28.963

Most laps led
Driver	Bobby Labonte	Joe Gibbs Racing
- Laps: 172

Winner
No. 18	Bobby Labonte	Joe Gibbs Racing

Television in the United States
- Network: FOX
- Announcers: Mike Joy, Larry McReynolds, Darrell Waltrip

Radio in the United States
- Radio: Performance Racing Network

The 2003 Bass Pro Shops MBNA 500 was the fourth stock car race of the 2003 NASCAR Winston Cup Series season and the 45th iteration of the event. The race was held on Sunday, March 9, 2003, in Hampton, Georgia at Atlanta Motor Speedway, a 1.54 miles (2.48 km) permanent asphalt quad-oval intermediate speedway. The race took the scheduled 325 laps to complete. Joe Gibbs Racing driver Bobby Labonte would make a late charge against Hendrick Motorsports driver Jeff Gordon near the end of the race, passing him with nine laps to go to win his 20th career NASCAR Winston Cup Series win and his first of the season. To fill out the podium, Dale Earnhardt Jr. of Dale Earnhardt, Inc. would finish third.

== Background ==
The layout of Atlanta Motor Speedway, the venue where the race was held.

Atlanta Motor Speedway (formerly Atlanta International Raceway) is a track in Hampton, Georgia, 20 miles (32 km) south of Atlanta. It is a 1.54-mile (2.48 km) quad-oval track with a seating capacity of 111,000. It opened in 1960 as a 1.5-mile (2.4 km) standard oval. In 1994, 46 condominiums were built over the northeastern side of the track. In 1997, to standardize the track with Speedway Motorsports' other two 1.5-mile (2.4 km) ovals, the entire track was almost completely rebuilt. The frontstretch and backstretch were swapped, and the configuration of the track was changed from oval to quad-oval. The project made the track one of the fastest on the NASCAR circuit.

=== Entry list ===
#	Driver	Team	Make
0	Jack Sprague	Haas CNC Racing	Pontiac
1	Steve Park	Dale Earnhardt, Inc.	Chevrolet
01	Jerry Nadeau	MB2 Motorsports	Pontiac
2	Rusty Wallace	Penske Racing	Dodge
4	Mike Skinner	Morgan–McClure Motorsports	Pontiac
5	Terry Labonte	Hendrick Motorsports	Chevrolet
6	Mark Martin	Roush Racing	Ford
7	Jimmy Spencer	Ultra Motorsports	Dodge
8	Dale Earnhardt Jr.	Dale Earnhardt, Inc.	Chevrolet
9	Bill Elliott	Evernham Motorsports	Dodge
10	Johnny Benson Jr.	MB2 Motorsports	Pontiac
11	Brett Bodine	Brett Bodine Racing	Ford
12	Ryan Newman	Penske Racing	Dodge
14	Larry Foyt	A. J. Foyt Enterprises	Dodge
15	Michael Waltrip	Dale Earnhardt, Inc.	Chevrolet
16	Greg Biffle	Roush Racing	Ford
17	Matt Kenseth	Roush Racing	Ford
18	Bobby Labonte	Joe Gibbs Racing	Chevrolet
19	Jeremy Mayfield	Evernham Motorsports	Dodge
20	Tony Stewart	Joe Gibbs Racing	Chevrolet
21	Ricky Rudd	Wood Brothers Racing	Ford
22	Ward Burton	Bill Davis Racing	Dodge
23	Kenny Wallace	Bill Davis Racing	Dodge
24	Jeff Gordon	Hendrick Motorsports	Chevrolet
25	Joe Nemechek	Hendrick Motorsports	Chevrolet
29	Kevin Harvick	Richard Childress Racing	Chevrolet
30	Jeff Green	Richard Childress Racing	Chevrolet
31	Robby Gordon	Richard Childress Racing	Chevrolet
32	Ricky Craven	PPI Motorsports	Pontiac
35	Bobby Hamilton Jr.	Team Rensi Motorsports	Ford
38	Elliott Sadler	Robert Yates Racing	Ford
40	Sterling Marlin	Chip Ganassi Racing	Dodge
41	Casey Mears	Chip Ganassi Racing	Dodge
42	Jamie McMurray	Chip Ganassi Racing	Dodge
43	John Andretti	Petty Enterprises	Dodge
45	Kyle Petty	Petty Enterprises	Dodge
48	Jimmie Johnson	Hendrick Motorsports	Chevrolet
49	Ken Schrader	BAM Racing	Dodge
54	Todd Bodine	BelCar Motorsports	Ford
57	Jeff Fultz	Team CLR	Ford
74	Tony Raines	BACE Motorsports	Chevrolet
77	Dave Blaney	Jasper Motorsports	Ford
88	Dale Jarrett	Robert Yates Racing	Ford
97	Kurt Busch	Roush Racing	Ford
99	Jeff Burton	Roush Racing	Ford
Official entry list

== Practice ==
Originally, three practice sessions were going to be held, with one on Friday and two on Saturday. However, fog on Saturday would force NASCAR to combine the two practices on Saturday into one session.

=== First practice ===
The first practice session was held on Friday, March 7, at 11:20 AM EST, and would last for 2 hours. Ryan Newman of Penske Racing would set the fastest time in the session, with a lap of 28.895 and an average speed of 191.867 miles per hour (308.780 km/h).

Pos.	#	Driver	Team	Make	Time	Speed
1	12	Ryan Newman	Penske Racing	Dodge	28.895	191.867
2	17	Matt Kenseth	Roush Racing	Ford	28.963	191.417
3	38	Elliott Sadler	Robert Yates Racing	Ford	28.970	191.370
Full first practice results

=== Second and final practice ===
The second and final practice session, sometimes referred to as Happy Hour, was held on Saturday, March 8, at 10:15 AM EST, and would last for one hour and 45 minutes. Tony Stewart of Joe Gibbs Racing would set the fastest time in the session, with a lap of 29.570 and an average speed of 187.487 miles per hour (301.731 km/h).

Pos.	#	Driver	Team	Make	Time	Speed
1	20	Tony Stewart	Joe Gibbs Racing	Chevrolet	29.570	187.487
2	12	Ryan Newman	Penske Racing	Dodge	29.664	186.893
3	2	Rusty Wallace	Penske Racing	Dodge	29.691	186.723
Full Happy Hour practice results

== Qualifying ==
Qualifying was held on Friday, March 7, at 3:05 PM EST. Positions 1-36 would be decided on time, while positions 37-43 would be based on provisionals. Six spots are awarded by the use of provisionals based on owner's points. The seventh is awarded to a past champion who has not otherwise qualified for the race. If no past champ needs the provisional, the next team in the owner points will be awarded a provisional.

Ryan Newman of Penske Racing would win the pole, setting a time of 31.211 and an average speed of 173.016 miles per hour (278.442 km/h).

Two drivers would fail to qualify: Bobby Hamilton Jr. and Jeff Fultz.

=== Full qualifying results ===
Pos.	#	Driver	Team	Make	Time	Speed
1	12	Ryan Newman	Penske Racing	Dodge	28.963	191.417
2	9	Bill Elliott	Evernham Motorsports	Dodge	28.991	191.232
3	38	Elliott Sadler	Robert Yates Racing	Ford	29.044	190.883
4	18	Bobby Labonte	Joe Gibbs Racing	Chevrolet	29.088	190.594
5	7	Jimmy Spencer	Ultra Motorsports	Dodge	29.127	190.339
6	15	Michael Waltrip	Dale Earnhardt, Inc.	Chevrolet	29.135	190.287
7	2	Rusty Wallace	Penske Racing	Dodge	29.191	189.922
8	20	Tony Stewart	Joe Gibbs Racing	Chevrolet	29.218	189.746
9	97	Kurt Busch	Roush Racing	Ford	29.224	189.707
10	19	Jeremy Mayfield	Evernham Motorsports	Dodge	29.225	189.701
11	48	Jimmie Johnson	Hendrick Motorsports	Chevrolet	29.237	189.623
12	22	Ward Burton	Bill Davis Racing	Dodge	29.262	189.461
13	25	Joe Nemechek	Hendrick Motorsports	Chevrolet	29.289	189.286
14	01	Jerry Nadeau	MB2 Motorsports	Pontiac	29.302	189.202
15	1	Steve Park	Dale Earnhardt, Inc.	Chevrolet	29.326	189.047
16	88	Dale Jarrett	Robert Yates Racing	Ford	29.334	188.996
17	29	Kevin Harvick	Richard Childress Racing	Chevrolet	29.337	188.976
18	31	Robby Gordon	Richard Childress Racing	Chevrolet	29.354	188.867
19	43	John Andretti	Petty Enterprises	Dodge	29.367	188.783
20	16	Greg Biffle	Roush Racing	Ford	29.373	188.745
21	21	Ricky Rudd	Wood Brothers Racing	Ford	29.380	188.700
22	32	Ricky Craven	PPI Motorsports	Pontiac	29.404	188.546
23	10	Johnny Benson Jr.	MB2 Motorsports	Pontiac	29.412	188.495
24	17	Matt Kenseth	Roush Racing	Ford	29.428	188.392
25	11	Brett Bodine	Brett Bodine Racing	Ford	29.443	188.296
26	99	Jeff Burton	Roush Racing	Dodge	29.470	188.124
27	77	Dave Blaney	Jasper Motorsports	Ford	29.476	188.085
28	30	Jeff Green	Richard Childress Racing	Chevrolet	29.480	188.060
29	6	Mark Martin	Roush Racing	Ford	29.484	188.034
30	24	Jeff Gordon	Hendrick Motorsports	Chevrolet	29.495	187.964
31	42	Jamie McMurray	Chip Ganassi Racing	Dodge	29.513	187.849
32	4	Mike Skinner	Morgan–McClure Motorsports	Pontiac	29.522	187.792
33	41	Casey Mears	Chip Ganassi Racing	Dodge	29.526	187.767
34	40	Sterling Marlin	Chip Ganassi Racing	Dodge	29.553	187.595
35	54	Todd Bodine	BelCar Motorsports	Ford	29.568	187.500
36	74	Tony Raines	BACE Motorsports	Chevrolet	29.576	187.449
Provisionals
37	8	Dale Earnhardt Jr.	Dale Earnhardt, Inc.	Chevrolet	30.202	183.564
38	45	Kyle Petty	Petty Enterprises	Dodge	30.015	184.708
39	5	Terry Labonte	Hendrick Motorsports	Chevrolet	29.844	185.766
40	23	Kenny Wallace	Bill Davis Racing	Dodge	29.812	185.965
41	14	Larry Foyt	A. J. Foyt Enterprises	Dodge	—	—
42	49	Ken Schrader	BAM Racing	Dodge	29.756	186.315
43	0	Jack Sprague	Haas CNC Racing	Pontiac	29.823	185.897
Failed to qualify
44	35	Bobby Hamilton Jr.	Team Rensi Motorsports	Ford	29.916	185.319
45	57	Jeff Fultz	Team CLR	Ford	30.158	183.832
Official qualifying results

== Race results ==
Fin	St	#	Driver	Team	Make	Laps	Led	Status	Pts	Winnings
1	4	18	Bobby Labonte	Joe Gibbs Racing	Chevrolet	325	172	running	185	$209,233
2	30	24	Jeff Gordon	Hendrick Motorsports	Chevrolet	325	68	running	175	$142,778
3	37	8	Dale Earnhardt Jr.	Dale Earnhardt, Inc.	Chevrolet	325	23	running	170	$113,917
4	24	17	Matt Kenseth	Roush Racing	Ford	325	0	running	160	$91,850
5	8	20	Tony Stewart	Joe Gibbs Racing	Chevrolet	325	17	running	160	$113,328
6	3	38	Elliott Sadler	Robert Yates Racing	Ford	325	1	running	155	$94,450
7	5	7	Jimmy Spencer	Ultra Motorsports	Dodge	325	1	running	151	$79,550
8	27	77	Dave Blaney	Jasper Motorsports	Ford	325	1	running	147	$80,125
9	13	25	Joe Nemechek	Hendrick Motorsports	Chevrolet	325	19	running	143	$58,225
10	1	12	Ryan Newman	Penske Racing	Dodge	324	21	running	139	$94,450
11	23	10	Johnny Benson Jr.	MB2 Motorsports	Pontiac	324	0	running	130	$84,400
12	22	32	Ricky Craven	PPI Motorsports	Pontiac	324	0	running	127	$76,375
13	20	16	Greg Biffle	Roush Racing	Ford	324	0	running	124	$51,775
14	34	40	Sterling Marlin	Chip Ganassi Racing	Dodge	324	0	running	121	$93,675
15	7	2	Rusty Wallace	Penske Racing	Dodge	324	0	running	118	$88,392
16	15	1	Steve Park	Dale Earnhardt, Inc.	Chevrolet	324	0	running	115	$75,512
17	18	31	Robby Gordon	Richard Childress Racing	Chevrolet	323	0	running	112	$77,912
18	12	22	Ward Burton	Bill Davis Racing	Dodge	323	0	running	109	$84,871
19	17	29	Kevin Harvick	Richard Childress Racing	Chevrolet	323	0	running	106	$87,968
20	39	5	Terry Labonte	Hendrick Motorsports	Chevrolet	323	0	running	103	$80,196
21	16	88	Dale Jarrett	Robert Yates Racing	Ford	323	0	running	100	$93,968
22	10	19	Jeremy Mayfield	Evernham Motorsports	Dodge	322	0	running	97	$59,435
23	33	41	Casey Mears	Chip Ganassi Racing	Dodge	322	0	running	94	$70,535
24	36	74	Tony Raines	BACE Motorsports	Chevrolet	322	0	running	91	$47,635
25	28	30	Jeff Green	Richard Childress Racing	Chevrolet	322	0	running	88	$59,035
26	40	23	Kenny Wallace	Bill Davis Racing	Dodge	322	0	running	85	$58,774
27	6	15	Michael Waltrip	Dale Earnhardt, Inc.	Chevrolet	321	0	running	82	$68,070
28	35	54	Todd Bodine	BelCar Motorsports	Ford	321	0	running	79	$49,920
29	19	43	John Andretti	Petty Enterprises	Dodge	320	0	running	76	$84,988
30	32	4	Mike Skinner	Morgan–McClure Motorsports	Pontiac	318	0	running	73	$47,085
31	14	01	Jerry Nadeau	MB2 Motorsports	Pontiac	316	0	crash	70	$46,510
32	11	48	Jimmie Johnson	Hendrick Motorsports	Chevrolet	308	2	engine	72	$65,835
33	26	99	Jeff Burton	Roush Racing	Dodge	305	0	engine	64	$80,687
34	38	45	Kyle Petty	Petty Enterprises	Dodge	296	0	running	61	$54,325
35	21	21	Ricky Rudd	Wood Brothers Racing	Ford	295	0	engine	58	$54,290
36	31	42	Jamie McMurray	Chip Ganassi Racing	Dodge	293	0	engine	55	$46,255
37	43	0	Jack Sprague	Haas CNC Racing	Pontiac	267	0	overheating	52	$46,220
38	42	49	Ken Schrader	BAM Racing	Dodge	182	0	engine	49	$46,175
39	2	9	Bill Elliott	Evernham Motorsports	Dodge	164	0	engine	46	$85,723
40	9	97	Kurt Busch	Roush Racing	Ford	143	0	engine	43	$66,090
41	25	11	Brett Bodine	Brett Bodine Racing	Ford	141	0	crash	40	$46,050
42	29	6	Mark Martin	Roush Racing	Ford	133	0	engine	37	$79,843
43	41	14	Larry Foyt	A. J. Foyt Enterprises	Dodge	104	0	engine	34	$45,069
Official race results

Previous race: 2003 UAW-Daimler Chrysler 400	NASCAR Winston Cup Series; 2003 season	Next race: 2003 Carolina Dodge Dealers 400
