= 2003 UAW-DaimlerChrysler 400 =

Third race of the 2003 NASCAR Winston Cup Series

2003 UAW-Daimler Chrysler 400
Race details
- Race 3 of 36 in the 2003 NASCAR Winston Cup Series
- The 2003 UAW-Daimler Chrysler 400 program cover.
- Date: March 2, 2003
- Official name: 6th Annual UAW-Daimler Chrysler 400
- Location: North Las Vegas, Nevada, Las Vegas Motor Speedway
- Course: Permanent racing facility
- Course length: 1.5 miles (2.41 km)
- Distance: 267 laps, 400.5 mi (644.542 km)
- Scheduled distance: 267 laps, 400.5 mi (644.542 km)
- Average speed: 132.934 miles per hour (213.937 km/h)
- Attendance: 140,000

Pole position
Driver	Bobby Labonte	Joe Gibbs Racing
- Time: 31.211

Most laps led
Driver	Dale Earnhardt Jr.	Dale Earnhardt, Inc.
- Laps: 97

Winner
No. 17	Matt Kenseth	Roush Racing

Television in the United States
- Network: FOX
- Announcers: Mike Joy, Larry McReynolds, Darrell Waltrip

Radio in the United States
- Radio: Performance Racing Network

The 2003 UAW-DaimlerChrysler 400 was the third stock car race of the 2003 NASCAR Winston Cup Series season and the sixth iteration of the event. The race was held on Sunday, March 2, 2003, in North Las Vegas, Nevada at Las Vegas Motor Speedway, a 1.5 miles (2.4 km) permanent D-shaped oval racetrack. The race took the scheduled 267 laps to complete. At race's end, Matt Kenseth of Roush Racing would dominate the late stages of the race to win his seventh career NASCAR Winston Cup Series win and his first and only win of the season. To fill out the podium, Dale Earnhardt Jr. and Michael Waltrip of Dale Earnhardt, Inc. would finish second and third, respectively.

== Background ==
The layout of Las Vegas Motor Speedway, the venue where the race was held.

Las Vegas Motor Speedway, located in Clark County, Nevada outside the Las Vegas city limits and about 15 miles northeast of the Las Vegas Strip, is a 1,200-acre (490 ha) complex of multiple tracks for motorsports racing. The complex is owned by Speedway Motorsports, Inc., which is headquartered in Charlotte, North Carolina.

=== Entry list ===
#	Driver	Team	Make
0	Jack Sprague	Haas CNC Racing	Pontiac
1	Steve Park	Dale Earnhardt, Inc.	Chevrolet
01	Jerry Nadeau	MB2 Motorsports	Pontiac
2	Rusty Wallace	Penske Racing	Dodge
02	Brandon Ash (Note: While Ash had participated in pre-race activities, he withdrew before qualifying.)	Ash Motorsports	Ford
4	Mike Skinner	Morgan–McClure Motorsports	Pontiac
5	Terry Labonte	Hendrick Motorsports	Chevrolet
6	Mark Martin	Roush Racing	Ford
7	Jimmy Spencer	Ultra Motorsports	Dodge
07	Ted Musgrave (Note: Withdrew due to the team's trucks and cars being wrecked during the Daytona weekend. In response, the team would skip the Vegas weekend to focus on the #7 and to get the trucks ready for Darlington Raceway.)	Ultra Motorsports	Dodge
8	Dale Earnhardt Jr.	Dale Earnhardt, Inc.	Chevrolet
9	Bill Elliott	Evernham Motorsports	Dodge
10	Johnny Benson Jr.	MB2 Motorsports	Pontiac
12	Ryan Newman	Penske Racing	Dodge
14	Larry Foyt	A. J. Foyt Enterprises	Dodge
15	Michael Waltrip	Dale Earnhardt, Inc.	Chevrolet
16	Greg Biffle	Roush Racing	Ford
17	Matt Kenseth	Roush Racing	Ford
18	Bobby Labonte	Joe Gibbs Racing	Chevrolet
19	Jeremy Mayfield	Evernham Motorsports	Dodge
20	Tony Stewart	Joe Gibbs Racing	Chevrolet
21	Ricky Rudd	Wood Brothers Racing	Ford
22	Ward Burton	Bill Davis Racing	Dodge
23	Kenny Wallace	Bill Davis Racing	Dodge
24	Jeff Gordon	Hendrick Motorsports	Chevrolet
25	Joe Nemechek	Hendrick Motorsports	Chevrolet
29	Kevin Harvick	Richard Childress Racing	Chevrolet
30	Jeff Green	Richard Childress Racing	Chevrolet
31	Robby Gordon	Richard Childress Racing	Chevrolet
32	Ricky Craven	PPI Motorsports	Pontiac
37	Derrike Cope	Quest Motor Racing	Chevrolet
38	Elliott Sadler	Robert Yates Racing	Ford
40	Sterling Marlin	Chip Ganassi Racing	Dodge
41	Casey Mears	Chip Ganassi Racing	Dodge
42	Jamie McMurray	Chip Ganassi Racing	Dodge
43	John Andretti	Petty Enterprises	Dodge
45	Kyle Petty	Petty Enterprises	Dodge
48	Jimmie Johnson	Hendrick Motorsports	Chevrolet
49	Ken Schrader	BAM Racing	Dodge
54	Todd Bodine	BelCar Motorsports	Ford
66	Hideo Fukuyama	BelCar Racing	Ford
74	Tony Raines	BACE Motorsports	Chevrolet
77	Dave Blaney	Jasper Motorsports	Ford
88	Dale Jarrett	Robert Yates Racing	Ford
97	Kurt Busch	Roush Racing	Ford
99	Jeff Burton	Roush Racing	Ford
Official entry list

== Practice ==
=== First practice ===
The first practice session was held on Friday, February 28, at 11:20 AM PST, and would last for 2 hours. Jeff Burton of Roush Racing would set the fastest time in the session, with a lap of 31.267 and an average speed of 172.706 miles per hour (277.943 km/h).

Pos.	#	Driver	Team	Make	Time	Speed
1	99	Jeff Burton	Roush Racing	Ford	31.267	172.706
2	97	Kurt Busch	Roush Racing	Ford	31.297	172.540
3	01	Jerry Nadeau	MB2 Motorsports	Pontiac	31.316	172.436
Full first practice results

=== Second practice ===
The second practice session was held on Saturday, March 1, at 9:30 AM PST, and would last for 45 minutes. Jimmie Johnson of Hendrick Motorsports would set the fastest time in the session, with a lap of 32.069 and an average speed of 168.387 miles per hour (270.993 km/h).

Pos.	#	Driver	Team	Make	Time	Speed
1	48	Jimmie Johnson	Hendrick Motorsports	Chevrolet	32.069	168.387
2	24	Jeff Gordon	Hendrick Motorsports	Chevrolet	32.149	167.968
3	97	Kurt Busch	Roush Racing	Ford	32.155	167.937
Full second practice results

=== Third and final practice ===
The third and final practice session, sometimes referred to as Happy Hour, was held on Friday, March 1, at 11:10 AM PST, and would last for 45 minutes. Kurt Busch of Roush Racing would set the fastest time in the session, with a lap of 32.131 and an average speed of 168.062 miles per hour (270.470 km/h).

Pos.	#	Driver	Team	Make	Time	Speed
1	97	Kurt Busch	Roush Racing	Ford	32.131	168.062
2	48	Jimmie Johnson	Hendrick Motorsports	Chevrolet	32.267	167.354
3	8	Dale Earnhardt Jr.	Dale Earnhardt, Inc.	Chevrolet	32.280	167.286
Full Happy Hour practice results

== Qualifying ==
Qualifying was held on Friday, February 28, at 3:05 PST. Positions 1-36 would be decided on time, while positions 37-43 would be based on provisionals. Six spots are awarded by the use of provisionals based on owner's points. The seventh is awarded to a past champion who has not otherwise qualified for the race. If no past champ needs the provisional, the next team in the owner points will be awarded a provisional.

Bobby Labonte of Joe Gibbs Racing would win the pole, setting a time of 31.211 and an average speed of 173.016 miles per hour (278.442 km/h).

Greg Biffle would be the only driver to fail to qualify.

=== Full qualifying results ===
Pos.	#	Driver	Team	Make	Time	Speed
1	18	Bobby Labonte	Joe Gibbs Racing	Chevrolet	31.211	173.016
2	24	Jeff Gordon	Hendrick Motorsports	Chevrolet	31.255	172.772
3	12	Ryan Newman	Penske Racing	Dodge	31.268	172.701
4	8	Dale Earnhardt Jr.	Dale Earnhardt, Inc.	Chevrolet	31.309	172.474
5	97	Kurt Busch	Roush Racing	Ford	31.315	172.441
6	43	John Andretti	Petty Enterprises	Dodge	31.360	172.194
7	99	Jeff Burton	Roush Racing	Ford	31.393	172.013
8	20	Tony Stewart	Joe Gibbs Racing	Chevrolet	31.394	172.007
9	15	Michael Waltrip	Dale Earnhardt, Inc.	Chevrolet	31.397	171.991
10	48	Jimmie Johnson	Hendrick Motorsports	Chevrolet	31.399	171.980
11	01	Jerry Nadeau	MB2 Motorsports	Pontiac	31.417	171.882
12	42	Jamie McMurray	Chip Ganassi Racing	Dodge	31.420	171.865
13	19	Jeremy Mayfield	Evernham Motorsports	Dodge	31.449	171.707
14	30	Jeff Green	Richard Childress Racing	Chevrolet	31.578	171.005
15	7	Jimmy Spencer	Ultra Motorsports	Dodge	31.578	171.005
16	10	Johnny Benson Jr.	MB2 Motorsports	Pontiac	31.605	170.859
17	17	Matt Kenseth	Roush Racing	Ford	31.652	170.605
18	41	Casey Mears	Chip Ganassi Racing	Dodge	31.700	170.347
19	45	Kyle Petty	Petty Enterprises	Dodge	31.743	170.116
20	22	Ward Burton	Bill Davis Racing	Dodge	31.789	169.870
21	31	Robby Gordon	Richard Childress Racing	Chevrolet	31.810	169.758
22	29	Kevin Harvick	Richard Childress Racing	Chevrolet	31.815	169.731
23	38	Elliott Sadler	Robert Yates Racing	Ford	31.829	169.657
24	54	Todd Bodine	BelCar Motorsports	Ford	31.831	169.646
25	2	Rusty Wallace	Penske Racing	Dodge	31.838	169.609
26	25	Joe Nemechek	Hendrick Motorsports	Chevrolet	31.839	169.603
27	88	Dale Jarrett	Robert Yates Racing	Ford	31.857	169.508
28	49	Ken Schrader	BAM Racing	Dodge	31.864	169.470
29	6	Mark Martin	Roush Racing	Ford	31.874	169.417
30	9	Bill Elliott	Evernham Motorsports	Dodge	31.884	169.364
31	14	Larry Foyt	A. J. Foyt Enterprises	Dodge	31.931	169.115
32	74	Tony Raines	BACE Motorsports	Chevrolet	31.960	168.961
33	23	Kenny Wallace	Bill Davis Racing	Dodge	31.962	168.951
34	40	Sterling Marlin	Chip Ganassi Racing	Dodge	31.970	168.908
35	77	Dave Blaney	Jasper Motorsports	Ford	31.970	168.908
36	5	Terry Labonte	Hendrick Motorsports	Chevrolet	31.988	168.813
Provisionals
37	32	Ricky Craven	PPI Motorsports	Pontiac	32.050	168.487
38	21	Ricky Rudd	Wood Brothers Racing	Ford	32.098	168.235
39	1	Steve Park	Dale Earnhardt, Inc.	Chevrolet	32.022	168.634
40	4	Mike Skinner	Morgan–McClure Motorsports	Pontiac	32.037	168.555
41	66	Hideo Fukuyama	BelCar Racing	Ford	33.516	161.117
42	0	Jack Sprague	Haas CNC Racing	Pontiac	32.557	165.863
43	37	Derrike Cope	Quest Motor Racing	Chevrolet	32.613	165.578
Failed to qualify or withdrew
44	16	Greg Biffle	Roush Racing	Ford	32.010	168.697
WD	02	Brandon Ash	Ash Motorsports	Ford	—	—
WD	07	Ted Musgrave	Ultra Motorsports	Dodge	—	—
Official qualifying results

== Race results ==
Fin	St	#	Driver	Team	Make	Laps	Led	Status	Pts	Winnings
1	17	17	Matt Kenseth	Roush Racing	Ford	267	88	running	180	$365,875
2	4	8	Dale Earnhardt Jr.	Dale Earnhardt, Inc.	Chevrolet	267	97	running	180	$267,167
3	9	15	Michael Waltrip	Dale Earnhardt, Inc.	Chevrolet	267	17	running	170	$190,550
4	1	18	Bobby Labonte	Joe Gibbs Racing	Chevrolet	267	1	running	165	$178,908
5	8	20	Tony Stewart	Joe Gibbs Racing	Chevrolet	267	0	running	155	$163,503
6	7	99	Jeff Burton	Roush Racing	Ford	267	0	running	150	$127,067
7	3	12	Ryan Newman	Penske Racing	Dodge	267	3	running	151	$128,025
8	34	40	Sterling Marlin	Chip Ganassi Racing	Dodge	267	0	running	142	$136,000
9	26	25	Joe Nemechek	Hendrick Motorsports	Chevrolet	267	0	running	138	$87,200
10	39	1	Steve Park	Dale Earnhardt, Inc.	Chevrolet	267	0	running	134	$111,862
11	10	48	Jimmie Johnson	Hendrick Motorsports	Chevrolet	267	2	running	135	$97,675
12	16	10	Johnny Benson Jr.	MB2 Motorsports	Pontiac	266	0	running	127	$107,725
13	22	29	Kevin Harvick	Richard Childress Racing	Chevrolet	266	0	running	124	$116,553
14	30	9	Bill Elliott	Evernham Motorsports	Dodge	266	0	running	121	$113,383
15	18	41	Casey Mears	Chip Ganassi Racing	Dodge	266	0	running	118	$105,100
16	36	5	Terry Labonte	Hendrick Motorsports	Chevrolet	266	0	running	115	$102,406
17	15	7	Jimmy Spencer	Ultra Motorsports	Dodge	266	0	running	112	$90,250
18	6	43	John Andretti	Petty Enterprises	Dodge	266	3	running	114	$109,928
19	38	21	Ricky Rudd	Wood Brothers Racing	Ford	266	1	running	111	$94,050
20	24	54	Todd Bodine	BelCar Motorsports	Ford	266	0	running	103	$84,750
21	13	19	Jeremy Mayfield	Evernham Motorsports	Dodge	266	0	running	100	$78,850
22	11	01	Jerry Nadeau	MB2 Motorsports	Pontiac	266	0	running	97	$78,139
23	21	31	Robby Gordon	Richard Childress Racing	Chevrolet	266	0	running	94	$94,737
24	32	74	Tony Raines	BACE Motorsports	Chevrolet	265	0	running	91	$64,550
25	20	22	Ward Burton	Bill Davis Racing	Dodge	265	0	running	88	$100,006
26	42	0	Jack Sprague	Haas CNC Racing	Pontiac	265	0	running	85	$62,550
27	14	30	Jeff Green	Richard Childress Racing	Chevrolet	265	0	running	82	$72,550
28	28	49	Ken Schrader	BAM Racing	Dodge	263	0	running	79	$60,550
29	43	37	Derrike Cope	Quest Motor Racing	Chevrolet	263	0	running	76	$60,350
30	33	23	Kenny Wallace	Bill Davis Racing	Dodge	261	0	running	73	$63,600
31	19	45	Kyle Petty	Petty Enterprises	Dodge	261	0	running	70	$70,400
32	12	42	Jamie McMurray	Chip Ganassi Racing	Dodge	258	0	running	67	$59,700
33	41	66	Hideo Fukuyama	BelCar Racing	Ford	258	0	running	64	$60,400
34	35	77	Dave Blaney	Jasper Motorsports	Ford	231	0	clutch	61	$67,300
35	31	14	Larry Foyt	A. J. Foyt Enterprises	Dodge	216	0	vibration	58	$59,100
36	37	32	Ricky Craven	PPI Motorsports	Pontiac	211	0	running	55	$66,900
37	2	24	Jeff Gordon	Hendrick Motorsports	Chevrolet	193	53	crash	57	$106,053
38	5	97	Kurt Busch	Roush Racing	Ford	179	2	crash	54	$78,475
39	40	4	Mike Skinner	Morgan–McClure Motorsports	Pontiac	174	0	crash	46	$58,275
40	25	2	Rusty Wallace	Penske Racing	Dodge	174	0	crash	43	$92,717
41	27	88	Dale Jarrett	Robert Yates Racing	Ford	131	0	crash	40	$103,633
42	23	38	Elliott Sadler	Robert Yates Racing	Ford	125	0	engine	37	$91,915
43	29	6	Mark Martin	Roush Racing	Ford	114	0	engine	34	$91,542
Official race results

Previous race: 2003 Subway 400	NASCAR Winston Cup Series; 2003 season	Next race: 2003 Bass Pro Shops MBNA 500 (March)
