= NASCAR Craftsman Truck Series at Las Vegas Motor Speedway =

NASCAR Craftsman Truck Series race at Las Vegas Motor Speedway

NASCAR Truck Series at Las Vegas

NASCAR Craftsman Truck Series
- Venue: Las Vegas Motor Speedway
- Location: Las Vegas, Nevada, United States

Circuit information
- Surface: Asphalt
- Length: 1.5 mi (2.4 km)
- Turns: 4

Stock car racing events in the NASCAR Craftsman Truck Series were held at Las Vegas Motor Speedway, in Las Vegas, Nevada during numerous seasons between 1996 and 2025.

== Spring race ==
Ecosave 200

NASCAR Craftsman Truck Series
- Venue: Las Vegas Motor Speedway
- Location: Las Vegas, Nevada; United States
- Corporate sponsor: Ecosave
- First race: 2018
- Last race: 2025
- Distance: 201 miles (323 km)
- Laps: 134; Stages 1/2: 30 each Final stage: 74
- Previous names: Stratosphere 200 (2018); Strat 200 (2019–2020); Bucked Up 200 (2021); Victoria’s Voice Foundation 200 presented by Westgate Resorts (2022–2024)
- Most wins (driver): Kyle Busch (4)
- Most wins (team): Kyle Busch Motorsports (6)
- Most wins (manufacturer): Toyota (6)

Circuit information
- Surface: Asphalt
- Length: 1.5 mi (2.4 km)
- Turns: 4

The Ecosave 200 was a 134-lap, 200-mile (320 km) NASCAR Craftsman Truck Series race that takes place at Las Vegas Motor Speedway.

Corey Heim is the final race winner.

=== History ===
Despite the agreement, Speedway Motorsports decided to cancel the second New Hampshire Motor Speedway race and that Las Vegas Motor Speedway would get a second Cup date, second Xfinity date, and second Truck date.

For the 2018 race, the race was known as the Stratosphere 200. The race name was shortened to the Strat 200 for 2019. Bucked Up then acquired the naming rights to the event in 2021.

In 2022, after the track announced they would be downsizing to just one truck event, the naming rights of the fall race in 2021 (Victoria’s Voice Foundation 200 presented by Westgate Resorts), became the title sponsor of the spring race.

In 2025, Ecosave, a net-zero emissions solutions company, became the title sponsor.

==== Past winners ====
Year	Date	No.	Driver	Team	Manufacturer	Race Distance		Race Time	Average Speed (mph)	Report	Ref
Year	Date	No.	Driver	Team	Manufacturer	Laps	Miles (km)	Race Time	Average Speed (mph)	Report	Ref
2018	March 2	51	Kyle Busch	Kyle Busch Motorsports	Toyota	134	201 (323.478)	1:38:19	122.665	Report	
2019	March 1	51	Kyle Busch	Kyle Busch Motorsports	Toyota	134	201 (323.478)	1:26:29	139.449	Report	
2020	February 21	51	Kyle Busch	Kyle Busch Motorsports	Toyota	134	201 (323.478)	1:39:30	121.206	Report	
2021	March 5	4	John Hunter Nemechek	Kyle Busch Motorsports	Toyota	134	201 (323.478)	2:05:27	96.134	Report	
2022	March 4	18	Chandler Smith	Kyle Busch Motorsports	Toyota	134	201 (323.477)	2:09:22	93.223	Report	
2023	March 3	51	Kyle Busch	Kyle Busch Motorsports	Chevrolet	134	201 (323.477)	1:41:57	118.293	Report	
2024	March 1	71	Rajah Caruth	Spire Motorsports	Chevrolet	134	201 (323.477)	1:32:50	129.91	Report	
2025	March 14	11	Corey Heim	Tricon Garage	Toyota	134	201 (323.477)	1:52:42	107.01	Report	

==== Multiple winners (drivers) ====
# Wins	Driver	Years won
4	Kyle Busch	2018, 2019, 2020, 2023

==== Multiple winners (teams) ====
# Wins	Team	Years won
6	Kyle Busch Motorsports	2018–2023

==== Manufacturer wins ====
# Wins	Make	Years won
6	(Japan) Toyota	2018-2022, 2025
2	(United States) Chevrolet	2023, 2024

== Fall race ==
Victoria’s Voice Foundation 200 presented by Westgate Resorts

NASCAR Camping World Truck Series
- Venue: Las Vegas Motor Speedway
- Location: Las Vegas, Nevada, United States
- Corporate sponsor: Westgate Las Vegas Resort & Casino
- First race: 1996
- Last race: 2021
- Distance: 201 miles (323 km)
- Laps: 134; Stages 1/2: 30 each Final stage: 74
- Previous names: Carquest 420K (1996); Carquest Auto Parts 420K (1997); Sam's Town 250 (1998); The Orleans 250 (1999); Orleans 350 (2001); Las Vegas 350 (2002–2005, 2009, 2017); Smith's Las Vegas 350 (2006–2007); Qwik Liner Las Vegas 350 (2008); Smith's Food & Drug Store 350 (2010); Smith's 350 (2011–2013); Rhino Linings 350 (2014–2015); DC Solar 350 (2016); World of Westgate 200 (2018–2020); Victoria's Voice Foundation 200 (2021)
- Most wins (driver): Jack Sprague, Mike Skinner, Austin Hill (2)
- Most wins (team): ThorSport Racing (4)
- Most wins (manufacturer): Toyota, Chevrolet (9)

Circuit information
- Surface: Asphalt
- Length: 1.5 mi (2.4 km)
- Turns: 4

The Victoria's Voice Foundation 200 was a 134-lap, 200-mile long NASCAR Camping World Truck Series race that took place at Las Vegas Motor Speedway.

=== History ===
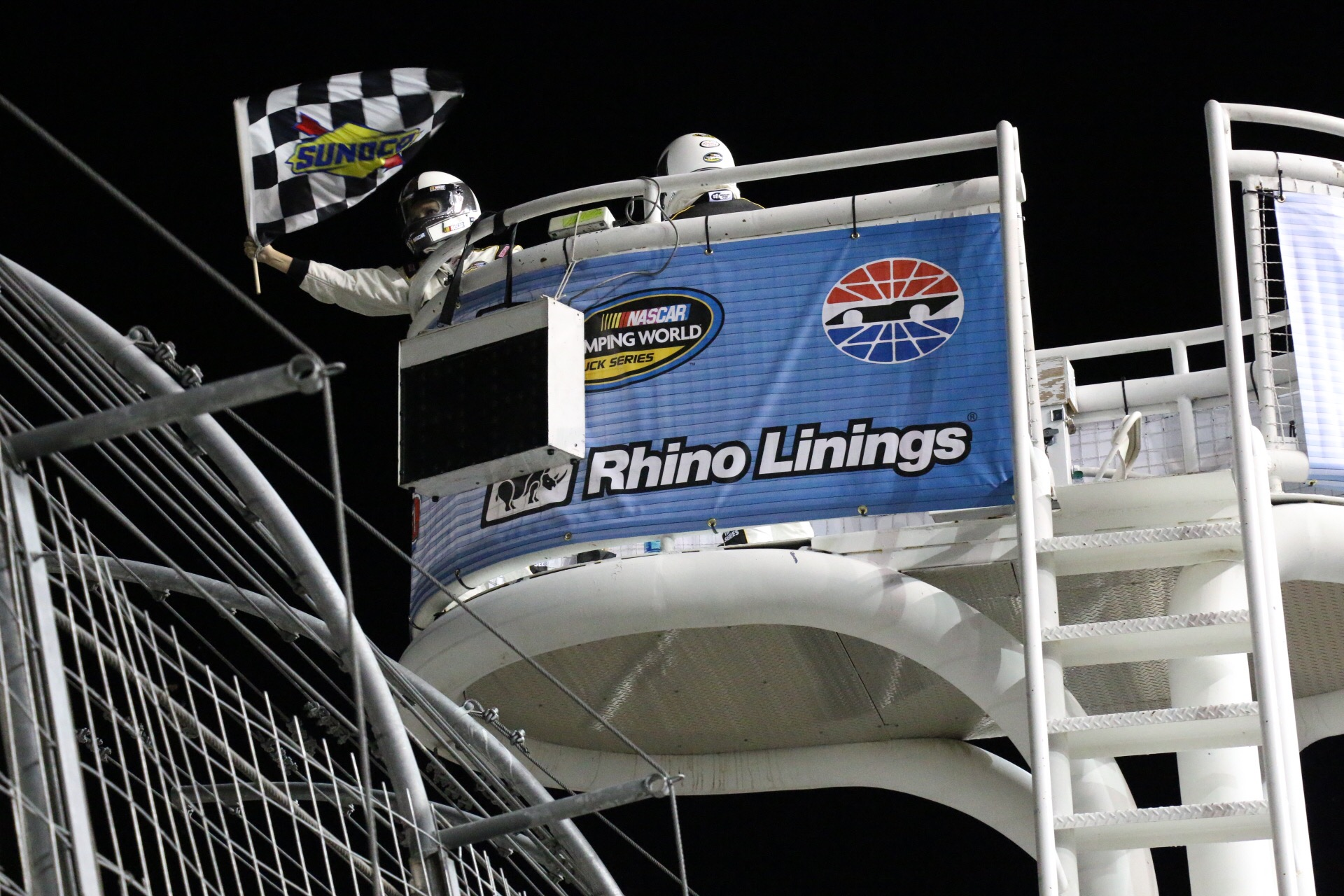
The checkered flag flies at the 2015 race

The race was first held on November 3, 1996 as the Carquest 420K. The race continued annually until 2000, when the race was removed from the schedule. However, the race returned as the Orleans 350 in 2001.

In 2011, the race was moved to October as part of the IndyCar weekend and became an afternoon race.

In 2012, the race was originally set for October 13 at 12 noon PDT as part of the IndyCar weekend, but Indy Racing League LLC faced issues from the 2011 IZOD IndyCar World Championship, with Truck race being that race's Saturday event, but the IndyCar race was removed as a result of legal issues following the death of Dan Wheldon on Lap 11 of the IndyCar race. As a result, it moved back to late September as a stand-alone race and returned to night time.

For the 2018 race, known as the World of Westgate 200, the event was shortened to 201 miles and 134 laps due to LVMS earned a 2nd race, now each of them had 201 miles and 134 laps.

When the 2022 schedule was released, it was announced that the race would not return, and Las Vegas would be only host one truck race in the spring.

=== Past winners ===
Year	Date	No.	Driver	Team	Manufacturer	Race Distance		Race Time	Average Speed (mph)	Report	Ref
Year	Date	No.	Driver	Team	Manufacturer	Laps	Miles (km)	Race Time	Average Speed (mph)	Report	Ref
1996	November 3	24	Jack Sprague	Hendrick Motorsports	Chevrolet	175	262.5 (422.452)	2:10:24	120.782	Report	
1997	November 9	80	Joe Ruttman	Roush Racing	Ford	175	262.5 (422.452)	2:05:09	125.849	Report	
1998	November 8	24	Jack Sprague	Hendrick Motorsports	Chevrolet	169*	253.5 (407.968)	1:56:07	130.801	Report	
1999	September 24	50	Greg Biffle	Roush Racing	Ford	167	250.5 (403.14)	1:58:08	127.229	Report	
2000	Not held										
2001	October 14	1	Ted Musgrave	Ultra Motorsports	Dodge	146	219 (352.446)	1:42:35	128.091	Report	
2002	October 13	75	David Starr	Spears Motorsports	Chevrolet	146	219 (352.446)	1:37:03	135.394	Report	
2003	September 27	62	Brendan Gaughan	Orleans Racing	Dodge	146	219 (352.446)	1:46:07	123.826	Report	
2004	September 25	15	Shane Hmiel	Billy Ballew Motorsports	Chevrolet	146	219 (352.446)	1:46:05	123.865	Report	
2005	September 24	30	Todd Bodine	Germain Racing	Toyota	152*	228 (366.93)	1:48:22	126.238	Report	
2006	September 23	5	Mike Skinner	Bill Davis Racing	Toyota	146	219 (352.446)	1:51:32	117.812	Report	
2007	September 22	6	Travis Kvapil	Roush Fenway Racing	Ford	146	219 (352.446)	1:54:12	115.061	Report	
2008	September 20	5	Mike Skinner	Bill Davis Racing	Toyota	147*	220.5 (354.86)	2:10:54	101.07	Report	
2009	September 26	13	Johnny Sauter	ThorSport/CAPG Racing	Chevrolet	146	219 (352.446)	1:42:59	127.593	Report	
2010	September 25	3	Austin Dillon	Richard Childress Racing	Chevrolet	146	219 (352.446)	1:51:00	118.378	Report	
2011	October 15	2	Ron Hornaday Jr.	Kevin Harvick Inc.	Chevrolet	146	219 (352.446)	2:06:16	104.065	Report	
2012	September 29	30	Nelson Piquet Jr.	Turner Motorsports	Chevrolet	146	219 (352.446)	1:57:15	112.068	Report	
2013	September 28	17	Timothy Peters	Red Horse Racing	Toyota	146	219 (352.446)	1:58:40	110.73	Report	
2014	September 27	51	Erik Jones	Kyle Busch Motorsports	Toyota	146	219 (352.446)	1:36:07	136.709	Report	
2015	October 3	05	John Wes Townley	Athenian Motorsports	Chevrolet	146	219 (352.446)	1:38:58	132.772	Report	
2016	October 1	29	Tyler Reddick	Brad Keselowski Racing	Ford	146	219 (352.446)	1:31:47	143.163	Report	
2017	September 30	27	Ben Rhodes	ThorSport Racing	Toyota	146	219 (352.446)	1:52:39	116.644	Report	
2018	September 14	98	Grant Enfinger	ThorSport Racing	Ford	144*	216 (347.618)	2:07:30	101.647	Report	
2019	September 13	16	Austin Hill	Hattori Racing Enterprises	Toyota	134	201 (323.477)	1:47:00	112.71	Report	
2020	September 25	16	Austin Hill	Hattori Racing Enterprises	Toyota	134	201 (323.477)	1:40:37	119.861	Report	
2021	September 24	98	Christian Eckes	ThorSport Racing	Toyota	134	201 (323.477)	1:54:28	105.358	Report	

- 1998, 2005, 2008 and 2018: Races extended due to NASCAR overtime.

==== Multiple winners (drivers) ====
# Wins	Driver	Years won
2	Jack Sprague	1996, 1998
2	Mike Skinner	2006, 2008
2	Austin Hill	2019, 2020

==== Multiple winners (teams) ====
# Wins	Team	Years won
4	ThorSport Racing	2009, 2017, 2018, 2021
3	Roush Fenway Racing	1997, 1999, 2007
2	Hendrick Motorsports	1996, 1998
2	Bill Davis Racing	2006, 2008
2	Hattori Racing Enterprises	2019, 2020

==== Manufacturer wins ====
# Wins	Make	Years won
9	(Japan) Toyota	2005, 2006, 2008, 2013, 2014, 2017, 2019, 2020, 2021
9	(United States) Chevrolet	1996, 1998, 2002, 2004, 2009, 2010, 2011, 2012, 2015
5	(United States) Ford	1997, 1999, 2007, 2016, 2018
2	(United States) Dodge	2001, 2003
