= 2003 Carolina Dodge Dealers 400 =

NASCAR race at Darlington Raceway

Race details
- Race 5 of 36 in the 2003 NASCAR Winston Cup Series season
- The 2003 Carolina Dodge Dealers program cover, celebrating the 100th race at Darlington Raceway.
- Date: March 16, 2003
- Official name: Carolina Dodge Dealers 400
- Location: Darlington Raceway, Darlington, South Carolina
- Course: Permanent racing facility
- Course length: 1.366 miles (2.198 km)
- Distance: 293 laps, 400.238 mi (644.014 km)
- Weather: Temperatures reaching up to 64.4 °F (18.0 °C); wind speeds up to 11.1 miles per hour (17.9 km/h)
- Average speed: 126.214 mph (203.122 km/h)
- Attendance: 55,000

Pole position
Driver	Elliott Sadler	Robert Yates Racing
- Time: 28.902

Most laps led
Driver	Dale Earnhardt Jr.	Dale Earnhardt, Inc.
- Laps: 91

Winner
No. 32	Ricky Craven	PPI Motorsports

Television in the United States
- Network: Fox Broadcasting Company
- Announcers: Mike Joy, Darrell Waltrip, Larry McReynolds
- Nielsen ratings: 5.9/15 (Final); 5.5/13 (Overnight)

Radio in the United States
- Radio: Motor Racing Network
- Booth announcers: Joe Moore and Barney Hall
- Turn announcers: Dave Moody (1 & 2) and Mike Bagley (3 & 4)

The 2003 Carolina Dodge Dealers 400 was the fifth stock car race of the 2003 NASCAR Winston Cup Series. It was held on March 16, 2003, before a crowd of 55,000, in Darlington, South Carolina, at Darlington Raceway. The 293-lap race, the 100th NASCAR Cup Series event at Darlington Raceway, was won by PPI Motorsports driver Ricky Craven starting from the 31st position. Kurt Busch of the Roush Racing squad finished in second place and Dave Blaney third for the Jasper Motorsports team.

Elliott Sadler won the pole position by recording the fastest lap in qualifying. He and Ryan Newman traded the lead for the first two laps. Dale Earnhardt Jr. assumed the lead on lap 17 and went on to lead for 91 laps, more than any other driver. On lap 197, Jeff Gordon led at a rolling restart after a yellow caution flag, ahead of Sadler. Busch passed Gordon on the 269th lap but later had a power steering failure, allowing Craven to gradually lower his lead. By lap 291, Craven drew close enough to challenge Busch; after two attempts at a pass failed, he overtook Busch on the final lap, and won by two-thousandths of a second, tied for the closest finish in Cup Series history until the 2024 AdventHealth 400, where Kyle Larson beat Chris Buescher by 0.001 seconds.

It was Craven's second win of his career. The result advanced him from sixteenth to fifth in the Drivers' Championship, 143 points behind Matt Kenseth, whose eighth-place finished maintained his championship lead over Tony Stewart. Ford maintained its lead in the Manufacturers' Championship, five points ahead of Chevrolet in second. Pontiac (in what would be ultimately their last win in the Winston Cup Series, as the marque withdrew from NASCAR at the end of the season) overtook Dodge for third with 31 races remaining in the season.

== Background ==
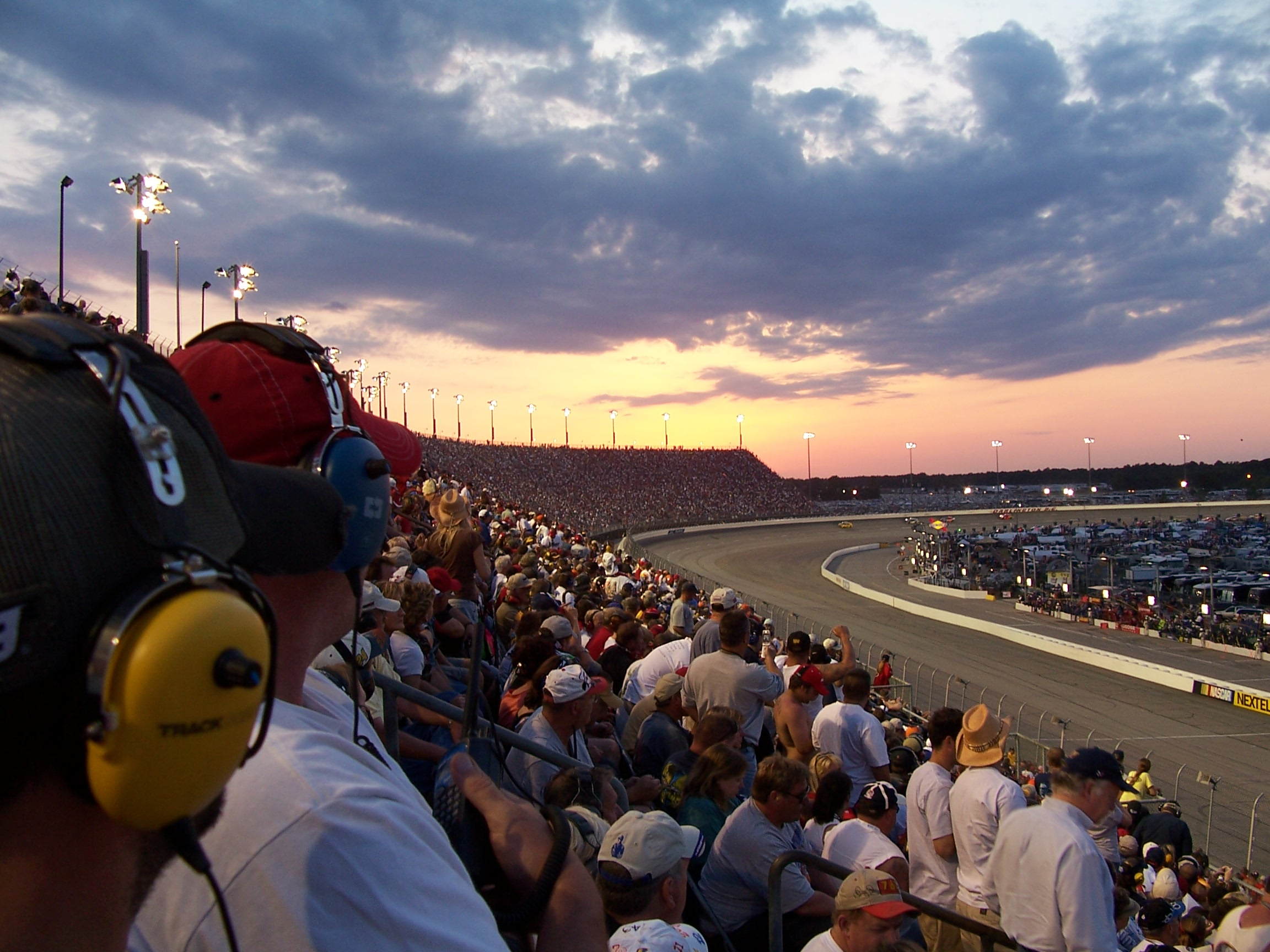
Darlington Raceway (pictured in 2008), where the race was held.

The 2003 Carolina Dodge Dealers 400 was the 5th of the 36 stock car races in the 2003 NASCAR Winston Cup Series. It was held on March 16, 2003, in Darlington, South Carolina, at Darlington Raceway, an intermediate oval track which began hosting NASCAR races in the 1950 Grand National Series; and was the 100th Cup Series race held at the track. The track is a four-turn 1.366 mi (2.198 km) egg-shaped superspeedway. Its first two turns are banked at 25 degrees, while the final two turns are banked at 23 degrees. The frontstretch (the location of the finish line) and the backstretch are banked at three and two degrees, respectively.

Before the race, Matt Kenseth led the Drivers' Championship with 618 points, and Tony Stewart followed with 569 points. Michael Waltrip and Jimmie Johnson were third and fourth with 543 and 519 points respectively, ahead of Bobby Labonte in fifth with 510 points. Johnny Benson Jr., Kevin Harvick, Jeff Gordon, Jeff Burton and Dale Earnhardt Jr. rounded out the top ten. In the Manufacturers' Championship, Ford led with a total of 30 points, three points ahead of Chevrolet in second position. Dodge, with 16 points, were one point ahead of Pontiac in third position. Sterling Marlin was the race's defending champion.

Darlington Raceway had a highly abrasive track surface, which was heavily used and altered the complex of racing there. Drivers were required to strenuously monitor their tire degradation, and track position was the most important aspect due to the difficulty of on-circuit overtaking. Gordon, who arrived as a favourite to win at Darlington Raceway due to his record six Winston Cup Series victories there, expressed a desire to continue his good form at the track: "We didn't win in Atlanta, but we led laps and battled hard for the win. That was our first good finish of the season – even though we've run well at each event – and I think that will give us some momentum this weekend."

== Practice and qualifying ==
Three practice sessions were held before the Sunday race—one on Friday morning and two on Saturday morning. The first session lasted 120 minutes, and the second and third sessions 45 minutes. In the first practice session, which was held in cool and overcast weather, Elliott Sadler was fastest with a lap of 29.125 seconds. He was followed by Labonte, Ryan Newman, Gordon, Kurt Busch, Kenny Wallace, Earnhardt, Rusty Wallace, Mark Martin and Dave Blaney.

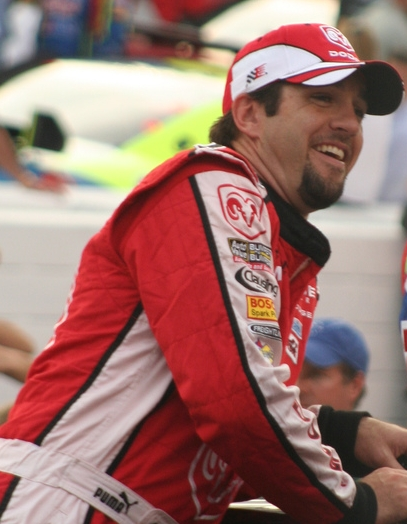
Elliott Sadler (pictured in 2007) took the first pole position of his career

A total of 43 drivers attempted to qualify on Friday afternoon; the maximum number allowed to race under NASCAR's qualifying procedure. Each driver ran two timed laps to determine pole position to 36th. The remainder of the field qualified through the use of provisionals; six were given to teams based on their 2002 Owners Championship placing and the seventh was reserved for a former champion who did not qualify for the event or the next squad in the Owners' standings. In his 146th race start, Sadler was the 16th driver on the track, and took the first pole position of his career with a lap of 28.902 seconds. He was joined on the grid's front row by Newman, who stated he could have bettered Sadler's lap had he not ran wide in turns one and two. Jerry Nadeau qualified third, Jimmy Spencer fourth, and Gordon fifth. Busch had the pole position until Sadler's lap, and subsequent improvements from other competitors later in the session demoted him to sixth. Ward Burton took seventh in the final minutes of qualifying. Marlin, eighth, altered the setup of his car to increase its handling stability. Waltrip and Todd Bodine were ninth and tenth. 37th to 43rd placed-qualifiers Jeff Burton, Joe Nemechek, Ricky Rudd, Kyle Petty, Tony Raines, Larry Foyt, and Brett Bodine used provisionals to enter the race. After qualifying Sadler said, "To get one this early and get it off our shoulders, you don't understand how big a relief this is and the weight that's been taken off my shoulders."

On Saturday morning Nadeau was quickest in the second practice session at 29.496 seconds, ahead of Johnson, Bill Elliott, Stewart, Kenseth, Greg Biffle, Nemechek, Martin, Harvick, and Gordon. During the session, Busch's engine failed on a slow lap; his team changed engines, which limited his on-track familiarisation. Kenseth's car emitted smoke due to an unsecured oil line, which his mechanics repaired. Later that day, Kenseth led the final practice session with a lap of 29.379 seconds; Johnson duplicated his second-practice result in second and Gordon improved from tenth to third. Nemechek, Jeff Green, Newman, Marlin, Kenny Wallace, Martin and Stewart made up positions four to ten. Towards the conclusion of the session, the right side of Waltrip's vehicle struck an outside barrier at turn two due to a cut tire, and he switched to a back-up car.

=== Qualifying results ===
Grid	Car	Driver	Team	Manufacturer	Time	Speed
1	38	Elliott Sadler	Robert Yates Racing	Ford	28.902	170.147
2	12	Ryan Newman	Penske Racing	Dodge	29.034	169.374
3	01	Jerry Nadeau	MB2 Motorsports	Pontiac	29.069	169.170
4	7	Jimmy Spencer	Ultra Motorsports	Dodge	29.083	169.089
5	24	Jeff Gordon	Hendrick Motorsports	Chevrolet	29.086	169.071
6	97	Kurt Busch	Roush Racing	Ford	29.101	168.984
7	22	Ward Burton	Bill Davis Racing	Dodge	29.111	168.926
8	40	Sterling Marlin	Chip Ganassi Racing	Dodge	29.130	168.816
9	15	Michael Waltrip	Dale Earnhardt, Inc.	Chevrolet	29.138	168.769
10	54	Todd Bodine	BelCar Motorsports	Ford	29.139	168.764
11	19	Jeremy Mayfield	Evernham Motorsports	Dodge	29.153	168.682
12	17	Matt Kenseth	Roush Racing	Ford	29.156	168.665
13	2	Rusty Wallace	Penske Racing	Dodge	29.178	168.538
14	48	Jimmie Johnson	Hendrick Motorsports	Chevrolet	29.190	168.469
15	49	Ken Schrader	BAM Racing	Dodge	29.226	168.261
16	8	Dale Earnhardt Jr.	Dale Earnhardt, Inc.	Chevrolet	29.241	168.175
17	16	Greg Biffle	Roush Racing	Ford	29.246	168.146
18	77	Dave Blaney	Jasper Motorsports	Ford	29.255	168.094
19	42	Jamie McMurray	Chip Ganassi Racing	Dodge	29.260	168.066
20	18	Bobby Labonte	Joe Gibbs Racing	Chevrolet	29.264	168.043
21	23	Kenny Wallace	Bill Davis Racing	Dodge	29.267	168.025
22	10	Johnny Benson Jr.	MB2 Motorsports	Pontiac	29.275	167.980
23	4	Mike Skinner	Morgan–McClure Motorsports	Pontiac	29.280	167.951
24	41	Casey Mears	Chip Ganassi Racing	Dodge	29.293	167.876
25	9	Bill Elliott	Evernham Motorsports	Dodge	29.309	167.785
26	43	John Andretti	Petty Enterprises	Dodge	29.312	167.768
27	6	Mark Martin	Roush Racing	Ford	29.330	167.665
28	20	Tony Stewart	Joe Gibbs Racing	Chevrolet	29.338	167.619
29	5	Terry Labonte	Hendrick Motorsports	Chevrolet	29.382	167.368
30	31	Robby Gordon	Richard Childress Racing	Chevrolet	29.423	167.135
31	32	Ricky Craven	PPI Motorsports	Pontiac	29.425	167.123
32	30	Jeff Green	Richard Childress Racing	Chevrolet	29.462	166.913
33	29	Kevin Harvick	Richard Childress Racing	Chevrolet	29.463	166.908
34	0	Jack Sprague	Haas CNC Racing	Pontiac	29.484	166.789
35	1	Steve Park	Dale Earnhardt, Inc.	Chevrolet	29.498	166.710
36	88	Dale Jarrett	Robert Yates Racing	Ford	29.554	166.394
Provisional
37	99	Jeff Burton	Roush Racing	Ford	29.637	165.928
38	25	Joe Nemechek	Hendrick Motorsports	Chevrolet	29.758	165.253
39	21	Ricky Rudd	Wood Brothers Racing	Ford	29.592	166.292
40	45	Kyle Petty	Petty Enterprises	Ford	29.643	165.894
41	74	Tony Raines	BACE Motorsports	Chevrolet	29.819	164.915
42	14	Larry Foyt	A. J. Foyt Racing	Dodge	29.931	164.298
43	57	Brett Bodine	CLR Racing	Ford	29.657	165.816

== Race ==
Live television coverage of the 293-lap 400.238 mi (644.121 km) race in the United States on Fox began at 12:30 Eastern Time (UTC−05:00). Play-by-play commentary was provided by Mike Joy, with analysis from three-time Cup Series champion Darrell Waltrip and former crew chief Larry McReynolds. Around the start of the race, the weather was cool and overcast, with the air temperature 63 °F (17 °C), and a maximum wind speed of 11.1 mph (17.9 km/h). Harold King, a board member of Darlington Raceway, began pre-race ceremonies with an invocation. Ann Benson, president of music at Columbia College in Columbia, South Carolina, performed the national anthem, and Mark Sanford, the Governor of South Carolina, commanded the drivers to start their engines. During the pace laps, Busch and Waltrip moved to the rear of the field because of their engine change and switch to a back-up car. Grip was difficult to locate and any advantage that drivers gained was minimal.

Newman passed Sadler for the lead in the first turn, which he held until Sadler retook it on the approach to the same corner at the beginning of lap two. On the third lap, Nadeau overtook Newman for second. Three laps later, Nadeau lost control of his car heading into the first corner, and spun 360 degrees. He avoided contact with a trackside wall and another car. Drivers behind him drove onto the apron to avoid a collision; Jamie McMurray made contact with Kenseth, causing the latter to spin, and bringing out the first yellow caution flag. Some drivers who had tight-handling cars elected to make pit stops for tires during the caution. Sadler maintained the lead at the lap 10 restart, followed by Gordon. Four laps later, Jack Sprague spun 360 degrees on the exit of turn four, prompting the second caution. Under caution, those drivers who remained on the track during the first caution, including Sadler, made pit stops.

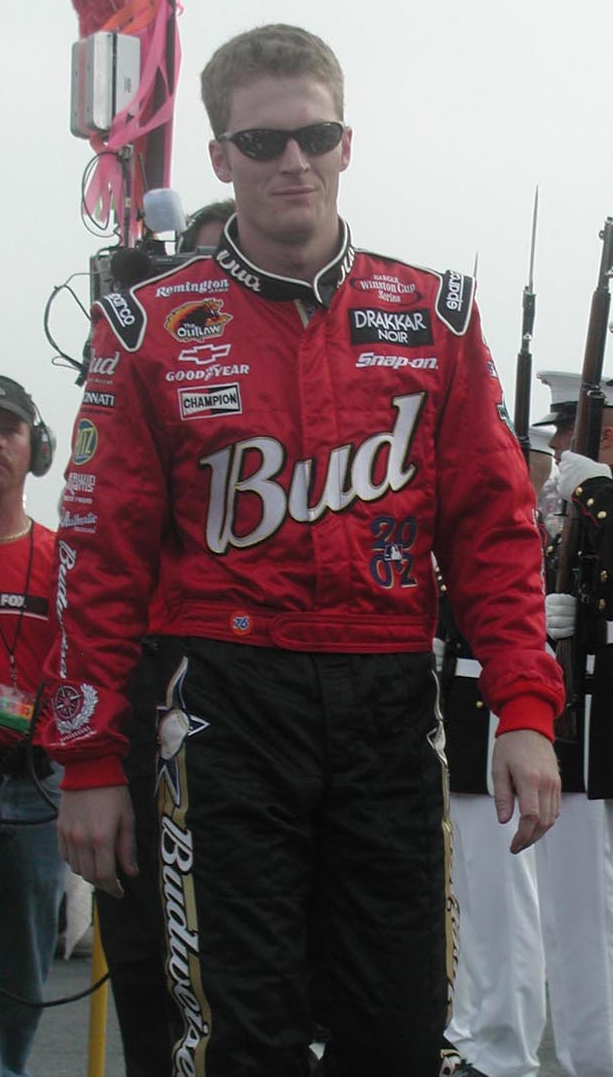
Dale Earnhardt Jr. (pictured in 2002) led a total of 91 laps, more than any other driver

Spencer did not make a pit stop and led at the restart on lap 17, followed by Earnhardt, Nadeau, John Andretti, and Green. On the following lap, Earnhardt's new tires helped him pass Spencer for the lead going into the third turn. Lap 23 saw the third caution: Johnson made contact with Marlin, cutting the latter's tire and disabling his steering. Marlin veered into an outside barrier on the backstretch. This caused a chain-reaction accident involving Labonte, Sprague, Todd Bodine, Harvick, Robby Gordon, and Raines. Harvick, Robby Gordon and Raines continued driving with aerodynamic deficiencies to their cars as Sprague, Todd Bodine, and Labonte sustained damage to their cars and were effectively eliminated from contention. Every driver, except for Jarrett and Jeff Gordon, made pit stops during the caution. Jarrett led the field at the lap 29 restart. On the 32nd lap, Earnhardt overtook Gordon and then Jarrett to return to the lead. The fourth caution was necessitated on lap 33 when Jeff Burton in ninth position had an engine failure, which obscured Stewart's vision and caused him to ram into Burton's car. Jarrett and Jeff Gordon made pit stops for tires under caution.

Earnhardt remained in first at the restart on lap 40, followed by Nadeau and Spencer. Two laps later, Stewart struck a trackside barrier; he continued without major car damage. Earnhardt led Nadeau by five seconds by the 50th lap, while Martin and his Roush Racing teammate Busch had advanced to third and fourth places. On lap 68, the fifth caution came out as Newman and Ward Burton raced each other in turn two; Burton drifted into the side of Newman's car and both cars spun without hitting a barrier. Track officials used dry blowers to remove debris. Some drivers made pit stops for tires during the caution. Earnhardt retained the lead from Martin and Nadeau at the restart on lap 75. Twelve laps later a fractured oil casing forced Nadeau to enter pit road, and drop out of contention for a strong result. Earnhardt established a lengthy advantage over Martin until slower traffic impeded him and allowed Martin to execute a pass for the first position on the 117th lap.

Green flag pit stops commenced on lap 121. Busch attempted to enter pit road eight laps later; he missed the entrance and completed one extra lap. On the same lap, Gordon passed Earnhardt for second place. Martin made his pit stop on the 132nd lap. He relinquished the lead to Gordon for a single lap. After the pit stops Martin regained the lead, with Gordon four seconds behind in second, and Kenseth third. By lap 169, Sadler had overtaken Kenseth and Gordon to advance to second position. The second round of green flag pit stops commenced on lap 185. Drivers who made pit stops hoping to advance their positions did not succeed, however, because a sixth caution was waved on lap 191. The right front corner of Spencer's vehicle came into contact with Andretti's left-rear wheel, causing the latter to sustain a flat tire. Andretti veered towards an inside barrier on the frontstretch and sustained damage to his car. Andretti was uninjured.

Some drivers, including Martin, made pit stops during the caution. Gordon led the field at the lap 197 restart. Martin made a brisk getaway to overtake Sadler and reclaim second position. Just as pit stop strategy was about affect the final result, officials noticed debris between the third and fourth turns and waved the seventh caution flag on lap 237. Several teams called their drivers into pit road for their final scheduled pit stops. Gordon exited pit road in first place, as a mechanic for Martin's car dropped a left front lug nut, which required Martin to stop again. He fell to eleventh position. The race restarted on the 242nd lap, with Gordon ahead of Sadler, Busch, Craven, and Blaney. Busch, whose power steering began to cut out from lap 243, passed Sadler for second place shortly after, and he began to duel Gordon for the lead. Sadler subsequently got involved, as Craven and Blaney used the battle to draw closer to them.

On lap 269, Gordon grazed the wall at turn two, which allowed Sadler to challenge him; his momentum was disrupted as he and Gordon went onto the backstretch. Busch drew alongside the pair, and steered to the bottom lane in turn three to take the lead. Gordon and Sadler struck a trackside wall on lap 273, allowing Craven to pass the duo and move into second five laps later. Sadler and Gordon then slowed with damage to their vehicles' toes. Craven, who had conserved the wear on his tires, had his crew chief Scott Miller read him his lap times and learnt he was faster than Busch; Craven slowed in turn four to avoid rear tire burnout. With a three-second lead it appeared that Busch would win comfortably, but his spotter informed him over the radio that Craven was drawing nearer. On the 283rd lap, Gordon drifted up the track, and hit a wall. Kenny Wallace hit Gordon's car, prompting the latter to enter pit road and retire from the event.

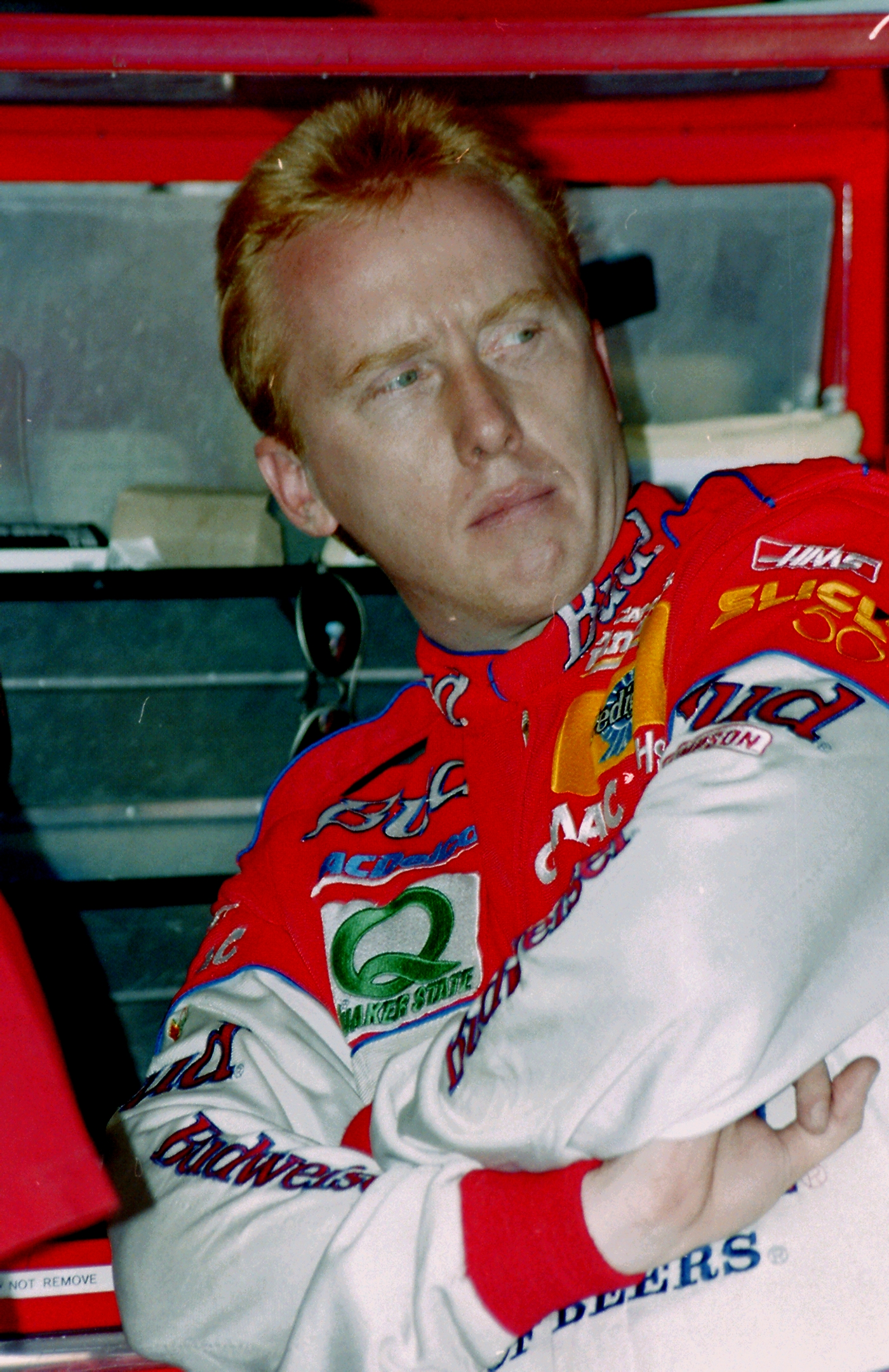
Ricky Craven (pictured in 1997) won the race by two thousandths of a second, the joint-closest finish in NASCAR Cup Series history

With ten laps to go, Busch's power steering failed, numbing his arms, reducing his stamina, and making his car more difficult to handle. Blaney, in third, drafted Craven on lap 289. Craven caught Busch on the 291st lap; He steered left to attempt to pass before turn one a lap later, but Busch performed a blocking maneuver popularized by Dale Earnhardt in that corner, a move Blaney anticipated. Busch held the lead on the backstretch, as Craven's car got loose because he could not remove his hands from the steering wheel. Craven followed Busch in turns three and four, and went to the inside of him at the beginning of lap 292. The two made contact into turn one; Craven slowed as Busch steered to the inside in turn two, after he was put towards a wall. Busch used his car's front bumper in a bump and run maneuver on Craven to regain the lead.

Busch opened up an advantage of about four-tenths of a second as he and Craven began the final lap. Craven followed Busch through the first and second corner as part of a plan to challenge Busch at the exit of the final turn. Busch had no plan on how to win the race since Craven was faster than him on the outside through turns three and four and Busch had to fight to regain control of his car. Between turns three and four, Busch spun his tires lightly, and could not steer to block Craven on the inside heading into the frontstretch. Craven drew alongside Busch at the exit of turn four; both drivers got loose without slowing, and clattered into each other several times in the final 300 yd (270 m), with smoke emitting from their tires.

The photo finish between Ricky Craven (driving the #32 car) and Kurt Busch (driving the #97 car)

Craven earned his second career win, beating Busch by 0.002 seconds (about 4 in (0.33 ft)), then the closest finish in NASCAR Cup Series history since the introduction of electronic scoring in the 1993 season. (Note: The record was equalled eight years later by Jimmie Johnson in the 2011 Aaron's 499 at Talladega Superspeedway. It was surpassed 13 years after that by Kyle Larson, who won the 2024 AdventHealth 400 at Kansas Speedway by 0.001 seconds over Chris Buescher.) Blaney placed third, his best career finish. Martin, Waltrip, Earnhardt, Sadler, Kenseth, Elliott, and Stewart completed the top ten. There were seven yellow flag cautions, and fifteen lead changes among eleven drivers during the race. Earnhardt's 91 laps led was the most of any driver. Craven led once for a single lap. The race took 3 hours, 10 minutes, and 16 seconds to complete; Craven's average speed was 126.214 mph (203.122 km/h).

=== Post-race ===
After crossing the finish line, Craven corrected his car, and on the way back to pit road, asked his crew who had won the race. Leaving turn two, with half a dozen crew members all drowning each other out on the radio, he glanced to his left to read the scoring pylon informing drivers and spectators of the finishing positions, and learnt he had succeeded. He ventured to victory lane, to celebrate his victory in front of a crowd of 55,000 spectators; the win earned him $172,150. Busch, known as "a fiery competitor", went to shake Craven's hand in an act of sportsmanship.

Craven commented on the win, "It's the most fun I've ever had in my life. This is exactly what you dream of. It will probably never happen again, but it's the perfect way to win a race at the perfect track. I have always wanted to win a race here". Busch was complimentary of the finish, "I can't wait to go see him. That was the coolest finish I've ever seen, and I'm glad I got to be a part of it. This is something where we'll slap high-fives and drink a couple beers to later on." Blaney spoke of the potential significance over his third-place result, "It's huge. I felt like I could race with these guys, it's just tough to get everything put together. I feel like we've got a team that's running well. Everything is flowing pretty good. We're not changing much with these cars. They're fast off the truck and Bootie [Barker, Blaney's crew chief] has the whole team energized and doing a great job."

After the race, Johnson and his crew chief Chad Knaus were ordered to report to meet Cup Series director John Darby in an office in NASCAR's hauler to explain the collision with Marlin early on. Marlin said a slower car required him to reduce his pace, and did not believe either he or Johnson were responsible for causing the accident, "It was just racing. I've never seen so many people racing this hard so early, like there were just 10 laps left, especially at a place like this where you need to be patient." Johnson later admitted responsibility for causing the accident, saying, "We just had a conversation with John Darby and looked at some videos. We discussed it (and) we all agreed that it was just a racing incident. I just lost some traction off of Turn 4 and ran out of race track and pinched the No. 40 (Marlin) into the wall and crashed him and myself. It was just a racing mistake on my part."

Earnhardt, who finished sixth and led more laps than any other driver, said an error with the installation of a lug nut prevented him from challenging for the victory, "This [Darlington] has really been an Achilles heel for us in the past. I feel real confident about this run today. I'm pretty happy. This is a tough track and it's hard to like. You know what I mean? It's like you can't live with it and you can't live without it, I'll tell you that." After his eighth-place finish, Kenseth spoke of his relief the collision with McMurray on lap six had not damaged his car's toe-in, "Eighth was great for us today – even if we weren't as beat up as we are. As bad as we ran the last couple times here, finishing eighth is really good." Gordon admitted he was fault for the collision on lap 273 that negatively affected his car's performance, and Sadler said he had committed "a stupid driving mistake" by following and heavily pressuring the former, and making the same driver error simultaneously.

Media reaction to the race was positive. Robin Miller of ESPN called the final two laps a sample of "what auto racing is all about. Two guys gassing, gouging and grinding to the checkered flag – damn the consequences" and the duel of Craven and Busch reminded him of a battle between Rick Mears and Gordon Johncock for the win in the last ten laps of the 1982 Indianapolis 500. Writing for the Daily Press, Al Pearce spoke of "a marvelous stock car race", The Atlanta Journal-Constitution's Rick Minter declared "the racing gods smiled on the old track" after Darlington Raceway was under threat of removal from the NASCAR Cup Series, and David Poole of The Charlotte Observer stated it was "electrifying" and the conclusion was "the kind of finish people will be talking about for years." In December 2009, the event was voted "the top NASCAR race of the decade" by the media, and it was named one of NASCAR's "75 Greatest Races" in 2023.

The race result kept Kenseth with 703 points in the lead of the Drivers' Championship, ahead of Stewart in second. Waltrip remained in third. Earnhardt gained six positions to progress to fourth, and Craven's victory elevated him from sixteenth to fifth. Busch advanced to sixth, and Blaney took over seventh. Johnson, Nemechek and Sadler rounded out the top ten. In the Manufacturers' Championship, Ford maintained the lead with 36 points; Chevrolet, Pontiac, and Dodge followed with 31, 24 and 19 respective points with 31 races remaining in the season.

=== Race results ===
Pos	Grid	Car	Driver	Team	Manufacturer	Laps	Points
1	31	32	Ricky Craven	PPI Motorsports	Pontiac	293	180^{1}
2	6	97	Kurt Busch	Roush Racing	Ford	293	175^{1}
3	18	77	Dave Blaney	Jasper Motorsports	Ford	293	165
4	27	6	Mark Martin	Roush Racing	Ford	293	165^{1}
5	9	15	Michael Waltrip	Dale Earnhardt, Inc.	Chevrolet	293	155
6	16	8	Dale Earnhardt Jr.	Dale Earnhardt, Inc.	Chevrolet	293	160^{2}
7	1	38	Elliott Sadler	Robert Yates Racing	Ford	293	151^{1}
8	12	17	Matt Kenseth	Roush Racing	Ford	293	142
9	25	9	Bill Elliott	Evernham Motorsports	Dodge	293	138
10	28	20	Tony Stewart	Joe Gibbs Racing	Chevrolet	293	134
11	23	4	Mike Skinner	Morgan–McClure Motorsports	Pontiac	292	130
12	17	16	Greg Biffle	Roush Racing	Ford	292	127
13	38	25	Joe Nemechek	Hendrick Motorsports	Chevrolet	292	129^{1}
14	2	12	Ryan Newman	Penske Racing	Dodge	292	126^{1}
15	39	21	Ricky Rudd	Wood Brothers Racing	Ford	292	118
16	13	2	Rusty Wallace	Penske Racing	Dodge	291	115
17	15	49	Ken Schrader	BAM Racing	Dodge	291	112
18	36	88	Dale Jarrett	Robert Yates Racing	Ford	291	114^{1}
19	32	30	Jeff Green	Richard Childress Racing	Chevrolet	291	106
20	35	1	Steve Park	Dale Earnhardt, Inc.	Chevrolet	291	103
21	4	7	Jimmy Spencer	Ultra Motorsports	Dodge	291	105^{1}
22	19	42	Jamie McMurray	Chip Ganassi Racing	Dodge	291	97
23	21	23	Kenny Wallace	Bill Davis Racing	Dodge	291	94
24	29	5	Terry Labonte	Hendrick Motorsports	Chevrolet	291	91
25	22	10	Johnny Benson Jr.	MB2 Motorsports	Pontiac	291	88
26	40	45	Kyle Petty	Petty Enterprises	Dodge	291	85
27	14	48	Jimmie Johnson	Hendrick Motorsports	Chevrolet	291	82
28	30	31	Robby Gordon	Richard Childress Racing	Chevrolet	291	84^{1}
29	7	22	Ward Burton	Bill Davis Racing	Dodge	290	76
30	11	19	Jeremy Mayfield	Evernham Motorsports	Dodge	289	73
31	43	57	Brett Bodine	CLR Racing	Ford	288	—
32	42	14	Larry Foyt	A. J. Foyt Racing	Dodge	288	67
33	5	24	Jeff Gordon	Hendrick Motorsports	Chevrolet	286	69^{1}
34	24	41	Casey Mears	Chip Ganassi Racing	Dodge	286	61
35	3	01	Jerry Nadeau	MB2 Motorsports	Pontiac	286	58
36	33	29	Kevin Harvick	Richard Childress Racing	Chevrolet	283	55
37	20	18	Bobby Labonte	Joe Gibbs Racing	Chevrolet	240	52
38	26	43	John Andretti	Petty Enterprises	Dodge	187	49
39	8	40	Sterling Marlin	Chip Ganassi Racing	Dodge	145	46
40	34	0	Jack Sprague	Haas CNC Racing	Pontiac	144	43
41	41	74	Tony Raines	BACE Motorsports	Chevrolet	60	40
42	37	99	Jeff Burton	Roush Racing	Ford	32	37
43	10	54	Todd Bodine	BelCar Motorsports	Ford	22	34
^{1} Includes five bonus points for leading a lap
^{2} Includes ten bonus points for leading the most laps

== Standings after the race ==
Drivers' Championship standings

Rank	+/–	Driver	Points
1		Matt Kenseth	760
2		Tony Stewart	703 (−57)
3		Michael Waltrip	698 (−62)
4	6	Dale Earnhardt Jr.	634 (−126)
5	11	Ricky Craven	617 (−143)
6	8	Kurt Busch	617 (−143)
7	8	Dave Blaney	603 (−157)
8	4	Jimmie Johnson	601 (−159)
9	2	Joe Nemechek	601 (−159)
10	9	Elliott Sadler	575 (−185)

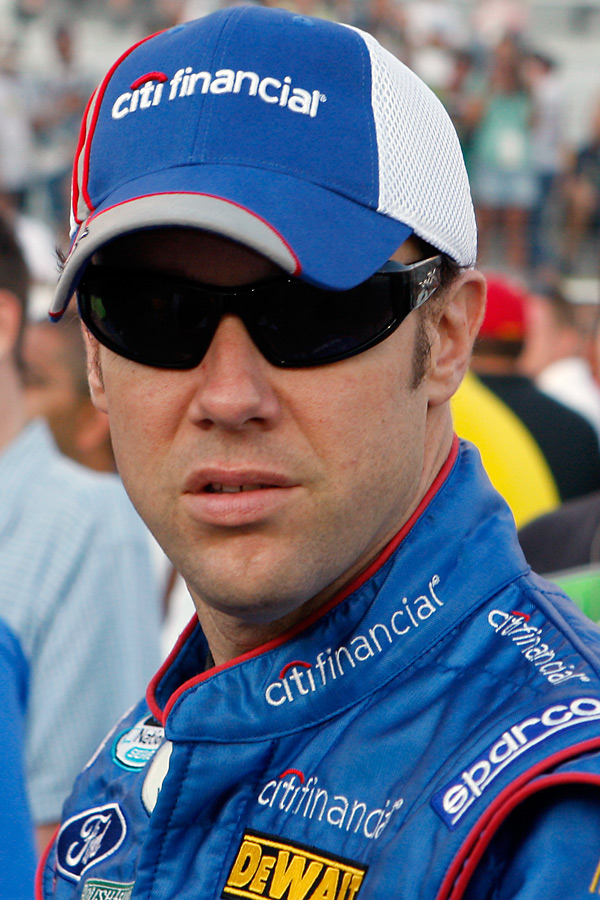
Matt Kenseth (pictured in 2009) remained the points leader with 760 points, after finishing eighth in the race.

Manufacturers' Championship standings

Rank	+/–	Manufacturer	Points
1		Ford	36
2		Chevrolet	31 (−5)
3	1	Pontiac	24 (−12)
4	1	Dodge	19 (−17)

== Notes ==
Previous race: 2003 Bass Pro Shops MBNA 500 (March)	Winston Cup Series; 2003 season	Next race: 2003 Food City 500
