= Jack Sprague =

American racing driver (born 1964)

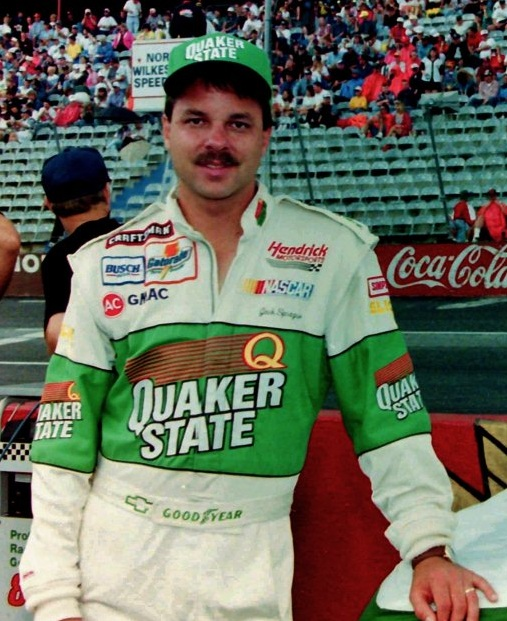
- Sprague in 1996
- Born: August 8, 1964 (age 62); Spring Lake, Michigan, U.S.
- Achievements: 1997, 1999, 2001 Craftsman Truck Series Champion

NASCAR Cup Series career
- 24 races run over 4 years
- Best finish: 40th (2003)
- First race: 1996 Dura Lube 500 (Phoenix)
- Last race: 2003 Tropicana 400 (Chicago)
Wins	Top tens	Poles
0	0	0

NASCAR O'Reilly Auto Parts Series career
- 108 races run over 9 years
- Best finish: 5th (2002)
- First race: 1989 All Pro 300 (Charlotte)
- Last race: 2002 Ford 300 (Homestead)
- First win: 2002 Inside Traxx 300 Presented by Met-Rx (Nashville)
Wins	Top tens	Poles
1	24	1

NASCAR FedEx Freight Truck Series career
- 297 races run over 13 years
- Best finish: 1st (1997, 1999, 2001)
- First race: 1995 Skoal Bandit Copper World Classic (Phoenix)
- Last race: 2008 Ford 200 (Homestead)
- First win: 1996 Chevy Desert Star Classic (Phoenix)
- Last win: 2007 Chevy Silverado HD 250 (Daytona)
Wins	Top tens	Poles
28	192	32
- Statistics up to date as of April 22, 2013.

Jack Eugene Sprague (born August 8, 1964) is an American former stock car racing driver who has competed in all of NASCAR's three top divisions, most notably in the NASCAR Craftsman Truck Series, where he won series championships in 1997, 1999 and 2001.

== Racing career ==
=== Beginnings ===
Sprague was born in Spring Lake, Michigan, and began racing street stock cars at local short tracks. After winning the track championships at Thunderbird Raceway and later Winston Raceway, Sprague began racing in the NASCAR Winston Racing Series, in its North Carolina Late Model Division competition. He won the Big Ten Championship at Concord Motorsports Park, and won more than 30 Late Model Races. Eventually, he won the NASCAR Winston Racing Series championship at Concord Motorsports Park.

Sprague finished first in the inaugural race of the NASCAR Sportsman Division at Charlotte Motor Speedway in 1989, but was disqualified in post-race inspection, giving the win to Tim Bender.

=== Busch Series ===
Sprague made his Busch Series debut in 1989 at Charlotte Motor Speedway. Driving the No. 78 Griffin Racing Chevrolet, he qualified 28th but finished 41st after suffering engine failure early in the race. After a 40th-place finish at the Goody's 300 for Pucci & Associates, Sprague moved up to drive the No. 34 Keystone Beer-sponsored car for Frank Cicci Racing in 1990. He competed in nineteen races and had a best finish of 6th at Orange County Speedway. The following season, Sprague competed in seven races, driving the No. 48 Staff America Oldsmobile. He won his first career pole at Charlotte. He continued to drive the car in 1992, where he had a 2nd-place finish at New River Valley Speedway. He finished 24th in the final points standings.

In 1993, Sprague signed to drive the No. 74 BACE Motorsports car. Despite four Top 10 finishes, he was released with just a handful of races left in the year. He finished 19th in points. Sprague returned to the Winston Cup Series in 1994.

=== Craftsman Truck Series ===
Sprague began racing in the Trucks' first year of competition in 1995. He began the season in the No. 31 Chevrolet C/K for Griffin Racing, winning the pole at Louisville Speedway. After the Action Packed Racing Cards 150, Sprague switched to the No. 25 Budweiser Chevy for Hendrick Motorsports for the rest of the year. He ended the season with a pole at Phoenix International Raceway, and had three 4th-place finishes. In 1996, he slid over to the No. 24 Quaker State truck owned by Hendrick, winning his first race at Phoenix, followed up by back-to-back victories at Nazareth Speedway and The Milwaukee Mile. With five wins total and two poles, Sprague lost the championship by 53 points. That season, he made his Winston Cup debut, running a pair of races in the No. 52 Pedigree Petfoods Pontiac Grand Prix for Ken Schrader. He led two laps and finished 23rd in his debut at Phoenix, but wrecked the following week at Atlanta Motor Speedway.

The following season, Sprague won at Phoenix, Nazareth, and Nashville Speedway USA, and won the championship. In addition, he returned to the Cup series, subbing for Ricky Craven at Bristol Motor Speedway, but finished 40th after a wreck. Despite winning the Truck Series championship, Quaker State did not return as Sprague's primary sponsor, forcing him to start 1998 unsponsored. After a one-race deal with Big Daddy's BBQ Sauce at Portland Speedway, Sprague won The No Fear Challenge in his debut for sponsor GMAC, allowing them to join full-time as sponsor. He won five races total that season and finished 2nd in points. He returned to the Busch Series to drive the No. 40 Channellock Chevy for Doug Taylor at Watkins Glen International, finishing 6th.

In 1999, Sprague won three races as well as the Craftsman Truck Series championship by eight points. He also drove at Watkins Glen in a Terry Labonte-owned car, finishing 12th, and attempted the Exide NASCAR Select Batteries 400 for Tyler Jet Motorsports, but failed to qualify. He won three more times in 2000, but six DNFs caused him to drop to 5th in the standings. In 2001, NetZero became his primary sponsor, and he won seven poles and four races, taking home his third championship trophy.

=== Return to Busch and Cup ===
After 2001, Sprague and teammate Ricky Hendrick moved back to the Busch Series, with Sprague driving the No. 24 NetZero Chevy. He won his first career Busch race at Nashville Superspeedway as well as leading the points during the season, before finishing 5th in the final standings. That same year, he ran the IROC series, finishing in the Top 10 in all four events. He returned to Winston Cup to run a handful of races for Haas CNC Racing's No. 60 entry. His best finish was a 30th at Homestead-Miami Speedway. Haas switched to Pontiac and the No. 0 with NetZero sponsorship for 2003, signing Sprague to compete for Winston Cup Rookie of the Year honors. Sprague's best finish that season was a 14th at the Daytona 500. After the Tropicana 400, Sprague was fired from the ride. He drove in two Truck races that year for Xpress Motorsports, finishing 5th in both events.

=== 2004–2011 ===
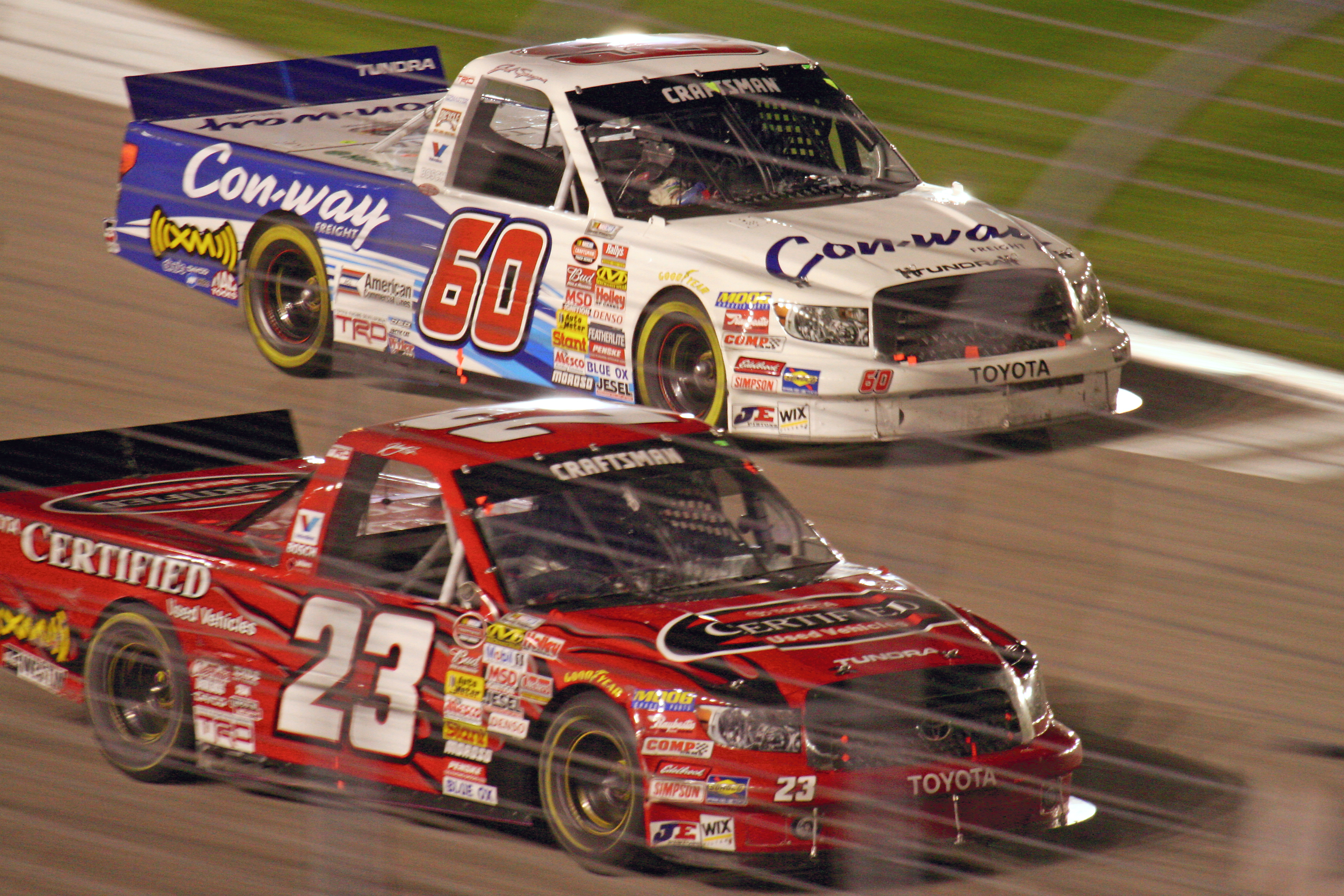
Sprague in the No. 60 Con-way Truck in 2007

Sprague took over the 16 Xpress truck full-time in 2004, winning six poles and the UAW/GM Ohio 250. He finished 7th in points. The following season, he won at Texas Motor Speedway, but late in the season, was released in favor of Mike Bliss and took over at newly formed Wyler Racing for Chad Chaffin. Despite switching teams mid-season, he finished 8th in points.

Sprague finished the 2006 season 5th in points with two wins and two poles. He returned to the Con-Way Freight Tundra for the 2007 season. Sprague started the 2007 season in the Craftsman Truck Series with a win in the Chevy Silverado HD 250 at the Daytona International Speedway. However, Sprague began to struggle throughout the year, even dropping out of the Top 10 in points. This, combined with Con-way's departure at the end of the season, led Sprague to leave Wyler for Kevin Harvick Incorporated where he drove the No. 2 American Commercial Lines Chevrolet. Late in the year, he left KHI to return to Wyler Racing.

Sprague remained on the sidelines throughout 2009 and 2010, into at least October 2011.

Sprague was rumored to return to the Trucks with Winfield Motorsports at Homestead. It was also rumored that Sprague had struck a deal with Randy Moss Motorsports to return to the series in 2012, though both deals apparently did not materialize as RMM's equipment was purchased by crew chief Richie Wauters to form his own team, Wauters Motorsports.

== Motorsports career results ==
=== NASCAR ===
(key) (Bold – Pole position awarded by qualifying time. Italics – Pole position earned by points standings or practice time. * – Most laps led.)

==== Winston Cup Series ====
NASCAR Winston Cup Series results
Year	Team	No.	Make	1	2	3	4	5	6	7	8	9	10	11	12	13	14	15	16	17	18	19	20	21	22	23	24	25	26	27	28	29	30	31	32	33	34	35	36	NWCC	Pts	Ref
1995	Hendrick Motorsports	59	Chevy	DAY	CAR	RCH	ATL	DAR	BRI	NWS	MAR	TAL	SON	CLT	DOV	POC	MCH	DAY	NHA	POC	TAL	IND	GLN	MCH	BRI	DAR	RCH	DOV	MAR	NWS	CLT	CAR	PHO	ATL; DNQ						NA	-	
1996	Ken Schrader Racing	52	Pontiac	DAY	CAR	RCH	ATL	DAR	BRI	NWS	MAR	TAL	SON	CLT	DOV	POC	MCH	DAY	NHA	POC	TAL	IND	GLN	MCH	BRI	DAR	RCH	DOV	MAR	NWS	CLT	CAR	PHO; 23	ATL; 42						54th	136	
1997	Hendrick Motorsports	25	Chevy	DAY	CAR	RCH	ATL	DAR	TEX	BRI; 40	MAR	SON	TAL	CLT	DOV	POC	MCH	CAL	DAY	NHA	POC	IND	GLN	MCH	BRI	DAR	RCH	NHA	DOV	MAR	CLT	TAL	CAR							68th	43	
1997	Hendrick Motorsports	52	Chevy																															PHO; DNQ	ATL					68th	43	
1999	Tyler Jet Motorsports	45	Pontiac	DAY	CAR	LVS	ATL	DAR	TEX	BRI	MAR	TAL	CAL	RCH	CLT	DOV	MCH	POC	SON	DAY	NHA	POC	IND	GLN	MCH	BRI	DAR	RCH; DNQ	NHA	DOV	MAR	CLT	TAL	CAR	PHO	HOM	ATL			NA	-	
2002	Haas CNC Racing	60	Chevy	DAY	CAR	LVS	ATL	DAR	BRI	TEX	MAR	TAL	CAL	RCH	CLT	DOV	POC	MCH	SON	DAY	CHI	NHA	POC	IND	GLN	MCH	BRI	DAR	RCH	NHA	DOV	KAN; 35	TAL	CLT; DNQ	MAR	ATL; DNQ	CAR; 35	PHO; DNQ	HOM; 30	57th	189	
2003	Haas CNC Racing	0	Pontiac	DAY; 14	CAR; 34	LVS; 26	ATL; 37	DAR; 40	BRI; 35	TEX; 22	TAL; 34	MAR; 29	CAL; 39	RCH; 26	CLT; 22	DOV; 41	POC; 22	MCH; 19	SON; 39	DAY; 31	CHI; 40	NHA	POC	IND	GLN	MCH	BRI	DAR	RCH	NHA	DOV	TAL	KAN	CLT	MAR	ATL	PHO	CAR	HOM	40th	1284	

===== Daytona 500 =====
Year	Team	Manufacturer	Start	Finish
2003	Haas CNC Racing	Pontiac	24	14

==== Busch Series ====
NASCAR Busch Series results
Year	Team	No.	Make	1	2	3	4	5	6	7	8	9	10	11	12	13	14	15	16	17	18	19	20	21	22	23	24	25	26	27	28	29	30	31	32	33	34	NBSC	Pts	Ref
1989	Griffin Racing	78	Chevy	DAY	CAR	MAR	HCY	DAR	BRI	NZH	SBO	LAN	NSV	CLT	DOV	ROU	LVL	VOL	MYB	SBO	HCY	DUB	IRP	ROU	BRI	DAR	RCH	DOV	MAR	CLT; 41	CAR	MAR						97th	40	
1990	Pucci & Associates	14	Chevy	DAY; 40	RCH	CAR	MAR	HCY	DAR	BRI	LAN	SBO																										24th	2106	
1990	Frank Cicci Racing	34	Buick										NZH; 24	HCY; 18	CLT; 30	DOV; 20	ROU; 6	VOL; 21	MYB; 15	OXF; 12	NHA; 21	SBO; 11	DUB; 17	IRP; 25	ROU; 15	BRI; 22	DAR; 25	RCH	DOV; 36	MAR; 20	CLT; 35	NHA; 46	CAR; 19	MAR; 17				24th	2106	
1991	Fred Turner Racing	48	Olds	DAY; 28	RCH	CAR	MAR	VOL	HCY	DAR; 39	BRI	LAN	SBO	NZH	**CLT**; 5	DOV	ROU	HCY	MYB	GLN	OXF	NHA	SBO	DUB	IRP	ROU	BRI	DAR; 12	RCH	DOV; 20	CLT; 38	NHA	CAR; 31	MAR				43rd	629	
1992	Fred Turner Racing	48	Olds	DAY; 19	CAR; 23	RCH; 11		MAR; 22	DAR; 25	BRI	HCY; 10	LAN; 22	DUB; 2	NZH; 21																								24th	1590	
1992	Fred Turner Racing	48	Chevy				ATL; 13								CLT; 37	DOV																						24th	1590	
1992	Fred Turner Racing	10	Chevy														ROU; 28	MYB; 13	GLN	VOL	NHA	TAL; 29	IRP	ROU; 26	MCH	NHA	BRI	DAR	RCH	DOV	CLT; 32	MAR	CAR	HCY				24th	1590	
1993	BACE Motorsports	74	Chevy	DAY; 44		RCH; 20	DAR; 24	BRI; 21	HCY; 19	ROU; 21	MAR; 9	NZH; 12		DOV; 27	MYB; 16		MLW; 32	TAL; 15	IRP; 17	MCH; 9	NHA; 20	BRI; 23	DAR; 33	RCH; 13	DOV; 4													19th	2429	
1993	BACE Motorsports	74	Pontiac		CAR; 12																																	19th	2429	
1993	BACE Motorsports	74	Olds										CLT; 24			GLN; 21																						19th	2429	
1993	Reno Racing	4	Chevy																							ROU; 9	CLT	MAR	CAR	HCY	ATL							19th	2429	
1994	Ingram Racing	10	Chevy	DAY; DNQ	CAR	RCH	ATL	MAR	DAR	HCY	BRI	ROU	NHA	NZH	CLT	DOV	MYB	GLN	MLW	SBO	TAL	HCY	IRP	MCH	BRI	DAR	RCH	DOV	CLT	MAR	CAR							NA	-	
1998	Taylor Motorsports	40	Chevy	DAY	CAR	LVS	NSV	DAR	BRI	TEX	HCY	TAL	NHA	NZH	CLT	DOV	RCH	PPR	GLN; 6	MLW	MYB																	85th	150	
1998	Joe Gibbs Racing	44	Chevy																			CAL; INQ^{†}	SBO	IRP	MCH	BRI	DAR	RCH	DOV	CLT	GTY	CAR	ATL	HOM				85th	150	
1999	Labonte Motorsports	44	Chevy	DAY	CAR	LVS	ATL	DAR	TEX	NSV	BRI	TAL	CAL	NHA	RCH	NZH	CLT	DOV	SBO	GLN; 12	MLW	MYB	PPR	GTY	IRP	MCH	BRI	DAR	RCH	DOV	CLT	CAR	MEM	PHO	HOM			96th	127	
2000	Andy Petree Racing	15	Chevy	DAY; 25	CAR	LVS; 36	ATL	DAR	BRI	TEX; 43	NSV	TAL	CAL	RCH	NHA	CLT	DOV	SBO	MYB	GLN	MLW	NZH	PPR	GTY	IRP	MCH	BRI	DAR	RCH	DOV	CLT	CAR	MEM	PHO	HOM			86th	17	
2002	Hendrick Motorsports	24	Chevy	DAY; 7	CAR; 6	LVS; 6	DAR; 9	BRI; 19	TEX; 2	NSH; 2	TAL; 13	**CAL**; 4	**RCH**; 18	NHA; 3	**NZH**; 26	CLT; 10	DOV; 5	NSH; 1*	KEN; 16	MLW; 14	DAY; 28	CHI; 42	GTY; 4	PPR; 14	IRP; 17	MCH; 15	BRI; 28	DAR; 5	RCH; 33	DOV; 3	KAN; 20	CLT; 25	MEM; 18	ATL; 42	CAR; 10	PHO; 22	HOM; 11	5th	4206	
^{†} - Qualified but replaced by J. D. Gibbs.

==== Craftsman Truck Series ====
NASCAR Camping World Truck Series results
Year	Team	No.	Make	1	2	3	4	5	6	7	8	9	10	11	12	13	14	15	16	17	18	19	20	21	22	23	24	25	26	27	NCWTC	Pts	Ref
1995	Griffin Racing	31	Chevy	PHO; 6	TUS; 5	SGS; 14	MMR; 6	POR; 10	EVG; 23	I70; 7	LVL; 9	BRI; 6	MLW; 9	CNS; 8	HPT; 7	IRP; 28															5th	2740	
1995	Hendrick Motorsports	25	Chevy														FLM; 4	RCH; 10	MAR; 20	NWS; 4	SON; 11	MMR; 4	**PHO**; 6								5th	2740	
1996	Hendrick Motorsports	24	Chevy	HOM; 2	PHO; 1	POR; 8	EVG; 12	TUS; 5	CNS; 4	HPT; 2	BRI; 5	NZH; 1	MLW; 1	LVL; 8	I70; 14	IRP; 2	FLM; 5	GLN; 4	**NSV**; 3	RCH; 29	NHA; 2	MAR; 3	NWS; 2	SON; 6	MMR; 5	**PHO**; 1	LVS; 1				2nd	3778	
1997	Hendrick Motorsports	24	Chevy	**WDW**; 15	TUS; 7	HOM; 5	**PHO**; 1	POR; 4	EVG; 2	I70; 10	**NHA**; 2	TEX; 31	BRI; 7	NZH; 1	**MLW**; 4	LVL; 8	CNS; 16	HPT; 2	IRP; 2	FLM; 4	NSV; 1	GLN; 3	RCH; 2	MAR; 10	SON; 5	MMR; 10	CAL; 6	PHO; 3	**LVS**; 2		1st	3969	
1998	Hendrick Motorsports	24	Chevy	WDW; 4	**HOM**; 2	PHO; 2	POR; 4	EVG; 1	I70; 5	GLN; 5	**TEX**; 6	BRI; 2	**MLW**; 3	NZH; 10	CAL; 1	PPR; 31	IRP; 1	NHA; 8	FLM; 29	NSV; 11	HPT; 4	LVL; 9	RCH; 1	MEM; 9	GTY; 4	MAR; 10	SON; 9	MMR; 2	PHO; 13	**LVS**; 1	2nd	4069	
1999	Hendrick Motorsports	24	Chevy	HOM; 22	**PHO**; 2	EVG; 2	MMR; 7	MAR; 3	MEM; 9	PPR; 2	I70; 1	BRI; 1	TEX; 5	PIR; 28	GLN; 3	MLW; 2	NSV; 5	NZH; 13	MCH; 4	NHA; 8	IRP; 34	GTY; 3	HPT; 26	RCH; 5	LVS; 2	LVL; 5	TEX; 11	CAL; 1			1st	3747	
2000	Hendrick Motorsports	24	Chevy	DAY; 33	HOM; 3	PHO; 2	MMR; 3	MAR; 3	PIR; 3	GTY; 1	MEM; 1	PPR; 4	EVG; 1	TEX; 28	KEN; 2	GLN; 5	MLW; 8	NHA; 34	NZH; 5	MCH; 13	IRP; 17	NSV; 30	CIC; 17	RCH; 6	DOV; 27	TEX; 22	CAL; 4				5th	3316	
2001	Hendrick Motorsports	24	Chevy	DAY; 12	HOM; 3	MMR; 2	MAR; 20	GTY; 8	**DAR**; 12	PPR; 3	DOV; 2	TEX; 1	**MEM**; 23	**MLW**; 2	KAN; 23	**KEN**; 3	**NHA**; 1	IRP; 1	NSH; 21	CIC; 9	NZH; 3	RCH; 1	**SBO**; 4	TEX; 3	**LVS**; 2	PHO; 2	CAL; 31				1st	3670	
2003	Xpress Motorsports	11	Chevy	DAY	DAR	MMR	MAR	CLT	DOV	TEX	MEM	MLW	KAN	KEN	GTW	MCH	IRP	NSH	BRI	RCH	NHA	CAL	LVS; 5	SBO	TEX	MAR	PHO	HOM; 5			66th	310	
2004	Xpress Motorsports	16	Chevy	DAY; 25	ATL; 24	**MAR**; 3	MFD; 1	CLT; 26	DOV; 9	TEX; 4	**MEM**; 7	MLW; 35	KAN; 8	KEN; 2	**GTW**; 29	MCH; 27	**IRP**; 18	NSH; 14	BRI; 28	RCH; 8	**NHA**; 2	LVS; 36	CAL; 3	TEX; 5	MAR; 28	**PHO**; 2	DAR; 11	HOM; 7			7th	3167	
2005	Xpress Motorsports	16	Chevy	DAY; 13	CAL; 22	ATL; 8	MAR; 11	GTY; 20	MFD; 2	CLT; 27	DOV; 29	TEX; 1	MCH; 10	**MLW**; 2	KAN; 30	KEN; 36	MEM; 13	IRP; 9	NSH; 21	BRI; 3	RCH; 26	NHA; 15	LVS; 4								8th	3137	
2005	Wyler Racing	60	Toyota																					MAR; 29	ATL; 4	TEX; 6	PHO; 16	HOM; 2			8th	3137	
2006	Wyler Racing	60	Toyota	DAY; 5	CAL; 5	ATL; 17	MAR; 17	GTY; 4	CLT; 34	MFD; 2	DOV; 9	TEX; 11	MCH; 10	MLW; 4	KAN; 29	KEN; 11	**MEM**; 1	IRP; 28	NSH; 2	BRI; 23	NHA; 18	LVS; 13	TAL; 33	**MAR**; 1	ATL; 10	TEX; 4	PHO; 7	HOM; 5			5th	3328	
2007	Wyler Racing	60	Toyota	**DAY**; 1	CAL; 3	ATL; 23	MAR; 16	KAN; 3	CLT; 34	MFD; 2	DOV; 28	TEX; 26	MCH; 29	MLW; 11	MEM; 2	KEN; 13	IRP; 9	NSH; 15	BRI; 8	GTW; 32	NHA; 24	LVS; 32	TAL; 27	**MAR**; 2	ATL; 25	TEX; 6	PHO; 10	HOM; 16			9th	3001	
2008	Kevin Harvick Incorporated	2	Chevy	DAY; 19	CAL; 22	ATL; 6	**MAR**; 24	KAN; 2	CLT; 14	MFD; 7	DOV; 2	TEX; 4	MCH; 30	MLW; 13	MEM; 6	KEN; 22	IRP; 17	NSH; 4	BRI; 14	GTW; 5	NHA; 9	LVS; 26	TAL; 27								9th	3125	
2008	Wyler Racing	60	Toyota																					MAR; 11	ATL; 13	TEX; 15	PHO; 17	HOM; 20			9th	3125	

=== ARCA Bondo/Mar-Hyde Series ===
(key) (Bold – Pole position awarded by qualifying time. Italics – Pole position earned by points standings or practice time. * – Most laps led.)

ARCA Bondo/Mar-Hyde Series results
Year	Team	No.	Make	1	2	3	4	5	6	7	8	9	10	11	12	13	14	15	16	17	18	19	20	21	22	23	24	25	ARSC	Pts	Ref
1996	Hendrick Motorsports	44	Chevy	DAY	ATL	SLM	TAL; 4	FIF	LVL	CLT	CLT	KIL	FRS	POC	MCH	FRS	TOL	POC	MCH	INF	SBS	ISF	DSF	KIL	SLM	WIN	CLT	ATL	157th	-	

=== International Race of Champions ===
(key) (Bold – Pole position. * – Most laps led.)

International Race of Champions results
Year	Make	1	2	3	4	Pos.	Pts	Ref
2002	Pontiac	DAY; 4	CAL; 5	CHI; 10	IND; 6	8th	36	

Sporting positions
Preceded by Ron Hornaday Jr.	NASCAR Craftsman Truck Series Champion; 1997	Succeeded by Ron Hornaday Jr.
Preceded by Ron Hornaday Jr.	NASCAR Craftsman Truck Series Champion; 1999	Succeeded by Greg Biffle
Preceded by Greg Biffle	NASCAR Craftsman Truck Series Champion; 2001	Succeeded by Mike Bliss
