= 2002 NASCAR Winston Cup Series =

American motorsport season

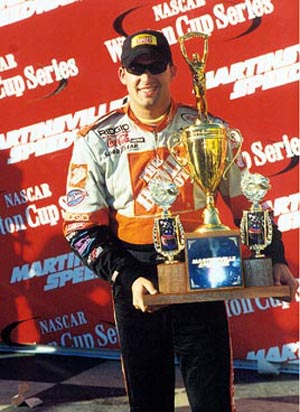
Tony Stewart, the 2002 Winston Cup Series champion

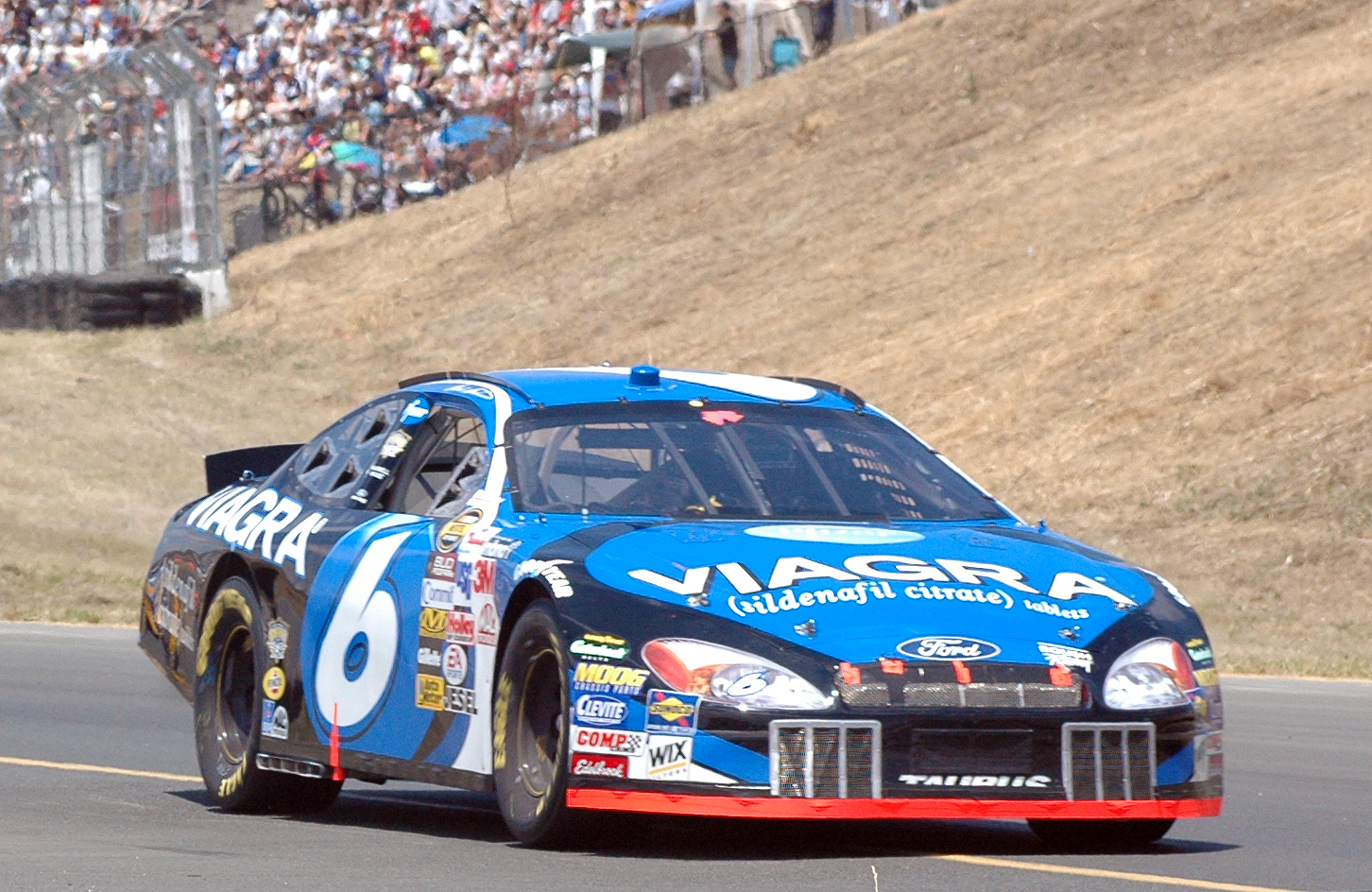
Mark Martin, driving the No. 6 car, came in second behind Stewart by 38 points.

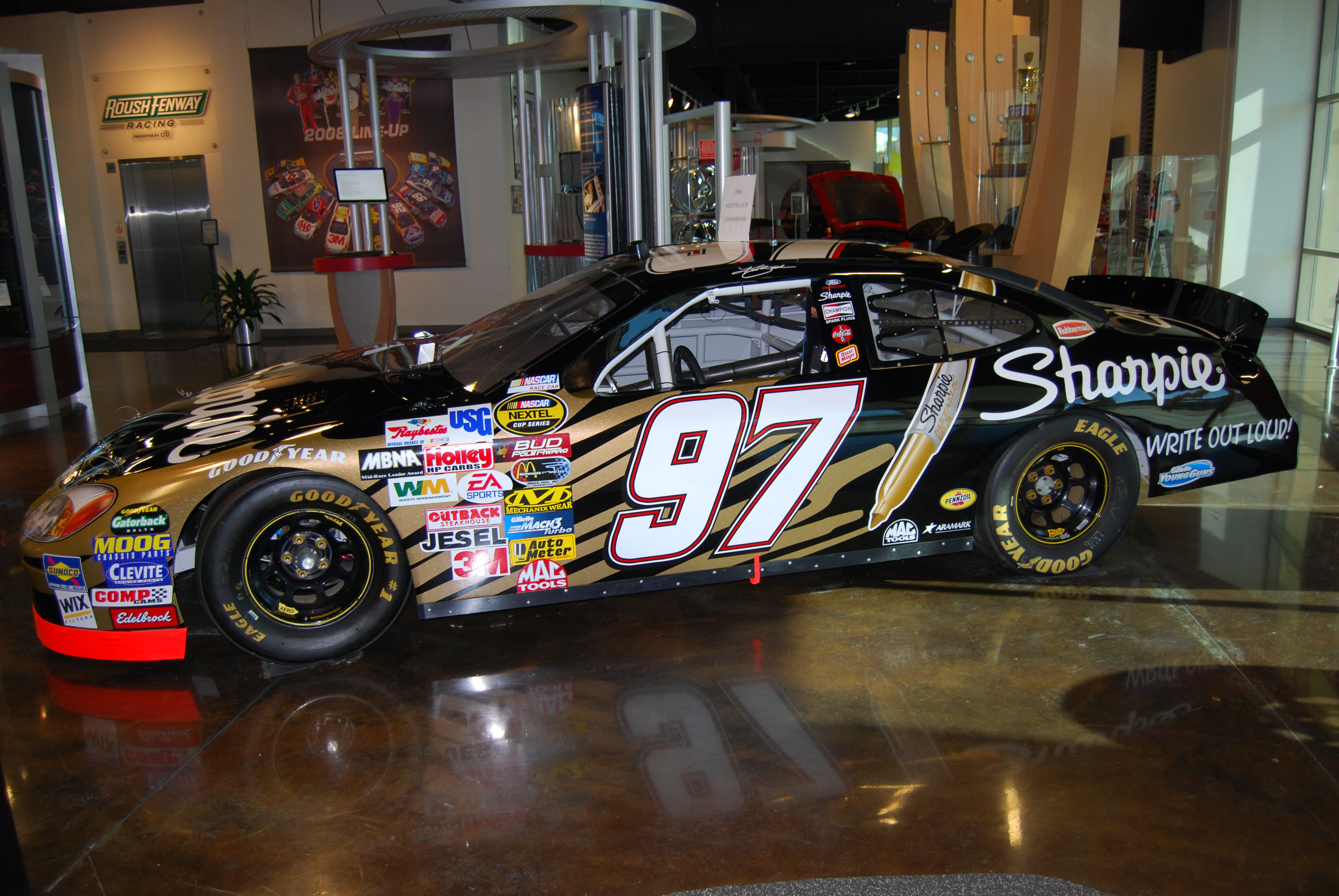
Kurt Busch, driving the No. 97 car, finished third in the championship.

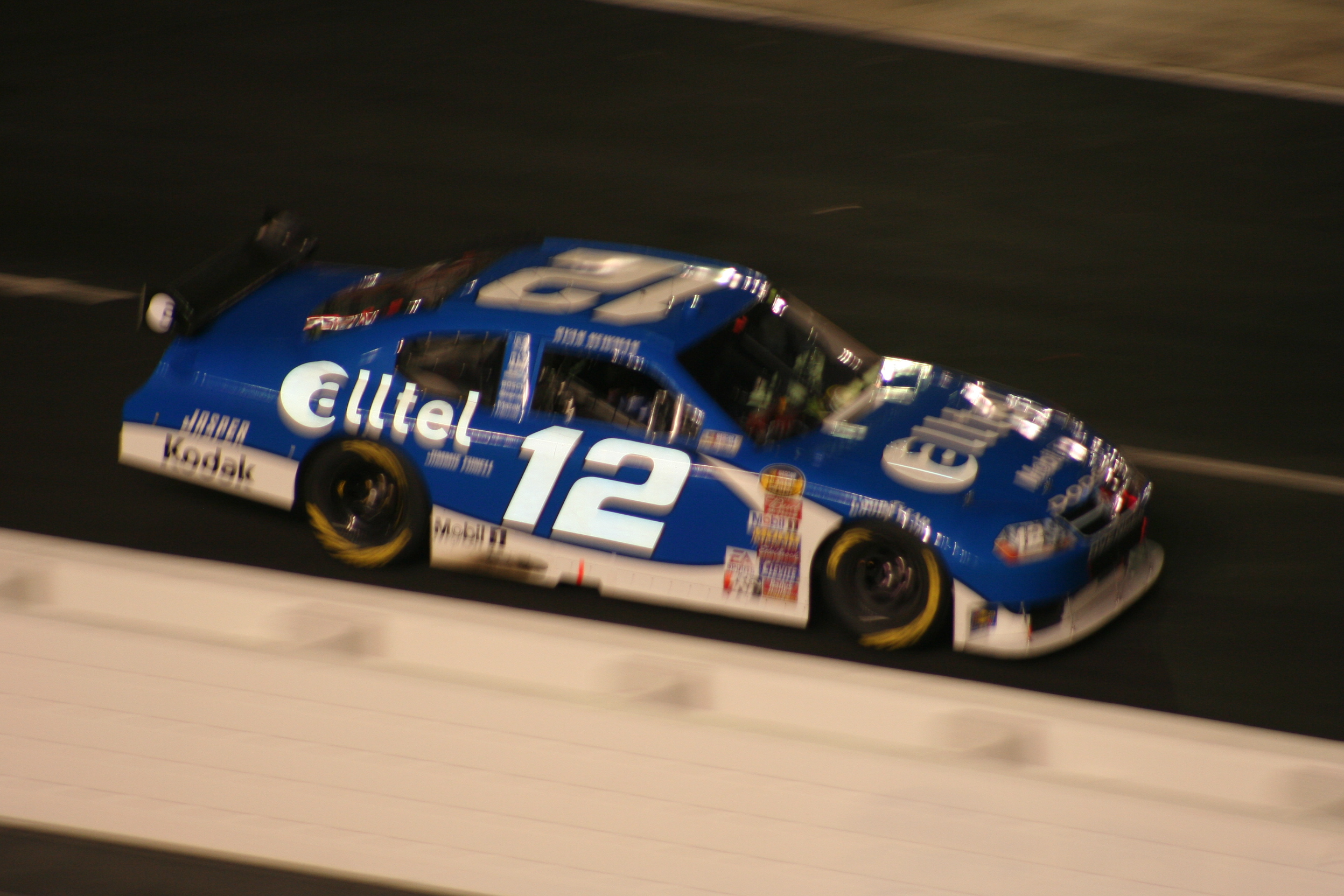
Ryan Newman, driving the No. 12 car, won Rookie of the year.

The 2002 NASCAR Winston Cup Series was the 54th season of professional stock car racing in the United States and the 31st modern-era Cup Series season. It began on February 10, 2002, at Daytona International Speedway, and ended on November 17, 2002, at Homestead–Miami Speedway. Tony Stewart, driving for Joe Gibbs Racing, was declared as the Winston Cup champion. Bill Elliott won the 2002 NASCAR's Most Popular Driver Award. He would win it for the 16th and final time in his career. He withdrew from the ballot after receiving the award. The NASCAR Manufacturers' Championship was captured by Ford after winning 14 events and gaining 245 points over second-place finisher Chevrolet, who had 10 wins and 211 points.

This was the final season for the non-common template bodies. The following season would require all manufacturers to use the same roofline. The most significant rule change for 2002 was the implementation of the one-engine rule for race weekends. At a race event, cars would now be required to practice, qualify, and race with the same engine. The rule banned separate "qualifying engines" (and "practice engines"). Unapproved engine changes during the weekend would be met with a grid penalty. Before the start of the race, cars that changed engines would be forced to move to the rear of the field before the green flag. The rule was an effort to reduce costs, and potentially save crews valuable time during the course of a race weekend.

== Teams and drivers ==
=== Complete schedule ===
Manufacturer	Team	No.	Driver	Crew chief
Chevrolet	Andy Petree Racing	55	Bobby Hamilton 31	Charley Pressley 11; Jimmy Elledge 25
Chevrolet	Andy Petree Racing	55	Greg Biffle 4	Charley Pressley 11; Jimmy Elledge 25
Chevrolet	Andy Petree Racing	55	Ron Hornaday Jr. 1	Charley Pressley 11; Jimmy Elledge 25
Chevrolet	Dale Earnhardt, Inc.	1	Kenny Wallace 4	Paul Andrews 25; Steve Hmiel 10
Chevrolet	Dale Earnhardt, Inc.	1	Steve Park 32	Paul Andrews 25; Steve Hmiel 10
Chevrolet	Dale Earnhardt, Inc.	8	Dale Earnhardt Jr.	Tony Eury
Chevrolet	Dale Earnhardt, Inc.	15	Michael Waltrip	Slugger Labbe
Chevrolet	Hendrick Motorsports	5	Terry Labonte	Jim Long
Chevrolet	Hendrick Motorsports	24	Jeff Gordon	Robbie Loomis
Chevrolet	Hendrick Motorsports	25	Jerry Nadeau 11	Tony Furr 4 Brian Pattie 22; Peter Sospenzo 10
Chevrolet	Hendrick Motorsports	25	Joe Nemechek 25	Tony Furr 4 Brian Pattie 22; Peter Sospenzo 10
Chevrolet	Hendrick Motorsports	48	Jimmie Johnson (R)	Chad Knaus
Chevrolet	Morgan-McClure Motorsports	4	Mike Skinner	Chris Carrier
Chevrolet	Richard Childress Racing	29	Kevin Harvick 35	Gil Martin
Chevrolet	Richard Childress Racing	29	Kenny Wallace 1	Gil Martin
Chevrolet	Richard Childress Racing	30	Jeff Green	Todd Berrier
Chevrolet	Richard Childress Racing	31	Robby Gordon	Kevin Hamlin
Dodge	Bill Davis Racing	22	Ward Burton	Tommy Baldwin Jr. 29; Frank Stoddard 7
Dodge	Bill Davis Racing	23	Hut Stricklin 23	Philippe Lopez
Dodge	Bill Davis Racing	23	Tom Hubert 1	Philippe Lopez
Dodge	Bill Davis Racing	23	Kenny Wallace 10	Philippe Lopez
Dodge	Bill Davis Racing	23	Scott Wimmer 1	Philippe Lopez
Dodge	Bill Davis Racing	23	Geoff Bodine 1	Philippe Lopez
Dodge	Chip Ganassi Racing	40	Sterling Marlin 29	Lee McCall
Dodge	Chip Ganassi Racing	40	Jamie McMurray 6	Lee McCall
Dodge	Chip Ganassi Racing	40	Mike Bliss 1	Lee McCall
Dodge	Chip Ganassi Racing	41	Jimmy Spencer 35	Doug Randolph
Dodge	Chip Ganassi Racing	41	Scott Pruett 1	Doug Randolph
Dodge	Evernham Motorsports	9	Bill Elliott	Mike Ford
Dodge	Evernham Motorsports	19	Jeremy Mayfield	Sammy Johns
Dodge	Petty Enterprises	43	John Andretti	Brandon Thomas
Dodge	Petty Enterprises	44	Buckshot Jones 8	Gary Putnam
Dodge	Petty Enterprises	44	Steve Grissom 11	Gary Putnam
Dodge	Petty Enterprises	44	Jerry Nadeau 13	Gary Putnam
Dodge	Petty Enterprises	44	Ted Musgrave 1	Gary Putnam
Dodge	Petty Enterprises	44	Greg Biffle 2	Gary Putnam
Dodge	Petty Enterprises	44	Christian Fittipaldi 1	Gary Putnam
Dodge	Petty Enterprises	45	Kyle Petty	Steven Lane
Dodge	Ultra-Evernham Motorsports	7	Casey Atwood 34	Kevin Cram 4 Buddy Barnes 6 Tony Furr 26
Dodge	Ultra Motorsports	7	Jason Leffler 2	Kevin Cram 4 Buddy Barnes 6 Tony Furr 26
Ford	Brett Bodine Racing	11	Brett Bodine	Jon Wolfe
Ford	Haas-Carter Motorsports	26	Joe Nemechek 7	Donnie Wingo
Ford	Haas-Carter Motorsports	26	Frank Kimmel 5	Donnie Wingo
Ford	Haas-Carter Motorsports	26	Todd Bodine 21	Donnie Wingo
Ford	Haas-Carter Motorsports	26	Geoff Bodine 3	Donnie Wingo
Ford	Jasper Motorsports	77	Dave Blaney	Ryan Pemberton
Ford	Penske Racing	2	Rusty Wallace	Bill Wilburn
Ford	Penske Racing	12	Ryan Newman (R)	Matt Borland
Ford	PPI Motorsports	32	Ricky Craven	Mike Beam
Ford	Robert Yates Racing	28	Ricky Rudd	Michael McSwain 33; Raymond Fox Jr. 3
Ford	Robert Yates Racing	88	Dale Jarrett	Jimmy Elledge 6 Todd Parrott 30
Ford	Roush Racing	6	Mark Martin	Ben Leslie
Ford	Roush Racing	17	Matt Kenseth	Robbie Reiser
Ford	Roush Racing	97	Kurt Busch	Jimmy Fennig
Ford	Roush Racing	99	Jeff Burton	Frank Stoddard 25; Paul Andrews 10
Ford	Wood Brothers Racing	21	Elliott Sadler	Pat Tryson
Pontiac	A. J. Foyt Racing	14	Stacy Compton 19	Mike Hillman
Pontiac	A. J. Foyt Racing	14	Mike Wallace 16	Mike Hillman
Pontiac	A. J. Foyt Racing	14	P. J. Jones 1	Mike Hillman
Pontiac	Joe Gibbs Racing	18	Bobby Labonte	Jimmy Makar 33; Michael McSwain 3
Pontiac	Joe Gibbs Racing	20	Tony Stewart	Greg Zipadelli
Pontiac	MB2 Motorsports	10	Johnny Benson 31	James Ince
Pontiac	MB2 Motorsports	10	Joe Nemechek 1	James Ince
Pontiac	MB2 Motorsports	10	Jerry Nadeau 3	James Ince
Pontiac	MB2 Motorsports	10	Mike Wallace 1	James Ince
Pontiac	MB2 Motorsports	36	Ken Schrader	Newt Moore

=== Limited schedule ===
Manufacturer	Team	No.	Driver	Crew Chief	Rounds
Chevrolet	Andy Petree Racing	33	Mike Wallace		4
Chevrolet	Andy Petree Racing	33	Kenny Wallace		1
Chevrolet	BACE Motorsports	73	Tony Raines		1
Chevrolet	BACE Motorsports	74	Chad Little		3
Chevrolet	BACE Motorsports	74	Tony Raines		10
Chevrolet	BACE Motorsports	74	Joe Varde		1
Chevrolet	Team Bristol Motorsports	54	Kevin Grubb		1
Chevrolet	BH Motorsports	54	Ron Hornaday Jr.		3
Chevrolet	BH Motorsports	54	David Green		1
Chevrolet	FitzBradshaw Racing	83	Kerry Earnhardt	Bob Temple	3
Chevrolet	FitzBradshaw Racing	83	Ron Hornaday Jr.	Bob Temple	1
Chevrolet	Haas CNC Racing	60	Jack Sprague	Dennis Conner	6
Chevrolet	Marcis Auto Racing	71	Dave Marcis	Bob Marcis	1
Chevrolet	Marcis Auto Racing	71	Dick Trickle	Bob Marcis	4
Chevrolet	Marcis Auto Racing	71	Andy Hillenburg	Bob Marcis	2
Chevrolet	Marcis Auto Racing	71	Jay Sauter	Bob Marcis	2
Chevrolet	Marcis Auto Racing	71	Jim Sauter	Bob Marcis	1
Chevrolet	Marcis Auto Racing	71	Tim Sauter	Bob Marcis	4
Chevrolet	Marcis Auto Racing	72	Dwayne Leik	Bob Marcis	1
Chevrolet	Michael Waltrip Racing	00	Jerry Nadeau		1
Chevrolet	Michael Waltrip Racing	00	Buckshot Jones		1
Chevrolet	Michael Waltrip Racing	98	Kenny Wallace		1
Chevrolet	Innovative Motorsports	98	Kenny Wallace		4
Chevrolet	NEMCO Motorsports	87	Ron Fellows		1
Chevrolet	Norm Benning Racing	84	Norm Benning (R)		1
Chevrolet	Roadrunner Motorsports	0	Jim Inglebright		1
Chevrolet	SCORE Motorsports	02	Hermie Sadler (R)	Jeff Buckner	11
Dodge	BAM Racing	49	Shawna Robinson (R)	Scott Eggleston	8
Dodge	BAM Racing	49	Ron Hornaday Jr.	Scott Eggleston	3
Dodge	BAM Racing	49	Derrike Cope	Scott Eggleston	5
Dodge	BAM Racing	49	Kevin Lepage	Scott Eggleston	1
Dodge	BAM Racing	49	Stuart Kirby	Scott Eggleston	1
Dodge	BAM Racing	49	Stacy Compton	Scott Eggleston	2
Dodge	Bill Davis Racing	27	Scott Wimmer		7
Dodge	Evernham Motorsports	91	Dick Trickle		1
Dodge	Evernham Motorsports	91	Hank Parker Jr. (R)		1
Dodge	Evernham Motorsports	91	Casey Atwood		1
Dodge	Chip Ganassi Racing	42	Jimmy Spencer		1
Dodge	Melling Racing	92	Robert Pressley		2
Dodge	Melling Racing	92	Stacy Compton		1
Dodge	Orleans Racing	62	Brendan Gaughan		1
Dodge	Orleans Racing	62	Austin Cameron		2
Dodge	Price Motorsports	59	Randy Renfrow		5
Dodge	Price Motorsports	59	Jason Small		1
Dodge	Price Motorsports	59	Carl Long (R)		5
Dodge	SR Racing	79	Carl Long (R)		1
Dodge	Ultra Motorsports	07	Ted Musgrave		5
Dodge	Ware Racing Enterprises	51	Carl Long		5
Dodge	Ware Racing Enterprises	51	Morgan Shepherd		2
Dodge	Ware Racing Enterprises	51	Brian Rose		1
Dodge	Ware Racing Enterprises	51	Jerry Robertson		1
Dodge	Mansion Motorsports	85	Carl Long (R)		4
Ford	Mansion Motorsports	85	Carl Long (R)		1
Ford	CLR Racing	57	Derrike Cope		1
Ford	CLR Racing	57	Ron Hornaday Jr.		2
Ford	CLR Racing	57	Stuart Kirby		2
Ford	Donlavey Racing	90	Rick Mast	Bobby King	11
Ford	Donlavey Racing	90	Hermie Sadler	Bobby King	3
Ford	Donlavey Racing	90	Gary Bradberry	Bobby King	1
Ford	Donlavey Racing	90	Ed Berrier	Bobby King	1
Ford	Donlavey Racing	90	Lance Hooper	Bobby King	1
Ford	Donlavey Racing	90	Jason Hedlesky	Bobby King	1
Ford	GIC Motorsports	93	Mike Harmon		2
Ford	Haas-Carter Motorsports	66	Todd Bodine	Larry Carter	3
Ford	Haas-Carter Motorsports	66	Geoff Bodine	Larry Carter	1
Ford	Haas-Carter Motorsports	66	Hideo Fukuyama	Larry Carter	3
Ford	Haas-Carter Motorsports	66	Frank Kimmel	Larry Carter	1
Ford	Hover Motorsports	80	Kirk Shelmerdine		1
Ford	McGlynn Racing	80	Ryan McGlynn		1
Ford	Jasper Motorsports	67	Boris Said	Mark Harrah	3
Ford	Kirk Shelmerdine Racing	72	Kirk Shelmerdine		2
Ford	Kirk Shelmerdine Racing	27	Kirk Shelmerdine		5
Ford	Phoenix Racing	09	Geoff Bodine	Marc Reno	8
Ford	Otto Motorsports	09	Shane Lewis		1
Ford	Quest Motor Racing	37	Derrike Cope		5
Ford	Quest Motor Racing	37	Kevin Lepage		1
Ford	Quest Motor Racing	37	Jeff Jefferson		1
Ford	Quest Motor Racing	38	Kevin Lepage		1
Ford	Roush Racing	16	Greg Biffle	Randy Goss	4
Ford	Shepherd Racing Ventures	89	Morgan Shepherd		8
Ford	Ash Motorsports	46	Brandon Ash		1
Ford	Ash Motorsports	46	Justin Bell		1
Pontiac	A. J. Foyt Racing	50	P. J. Jones		1
Pontiac	Gerhart Racing	59	Bobby Gerhart (R)		2

== Schedule ==
No.	Race title	Track	Date
	Budweiser Shootout	Daytona International Speedway, Daytona Beach	February 10
	Gatorade 125s	Daytona International Speedway, Daytona Beach	February 14
1	Daytona 500	Daytona International Speedway, Daytona Beach	February 17
2	Subway 400	North Carolina Speedway, Rockingham	February 24
3	UAW-DaimlerChrysler 400	Las Vegas Motor Speedway, Las Vegas	March 3
4	MBNA America 500	Atlanta Motor Speedway, Hampton	March 10
5	Carolina Dodge Dealers 400	Darlington Raceway, Darlington	March 17
6	Food City 500	Bristol Motor Speedway, Bristol	March 24
7	Samsung/RadioShack 500	Texas Motor Speedway, Fort Worth	April 8
8	Virginia 500	Martinsville Speedway, Ridgeway	April 14
9	Aaron's 499	Talladega Superspeedway, Talladega	April 21
10	NAPA Auto Parts 500	California Speedway, Fontana	April 28
11	Pontiac Excitement 400	Richmond International Raceway, Richmond	May 4–5
	No Bull Sprint	Lowe's Motor Speedway, Concord	May 18
	Winston Open	Lowe's Motor Speedway, Concord	May 18
	The Winston	Lowe's Motor Speedway, Concord	May 18
12	Coca-Cola Racing Family 600	Lowe's Motor Speedway, Concord	May 26
13	MBNA Platinum 400	Dover International Speedway, Dover	June 2
14	Pocono 500	Pocono Raceway, Long Pond	June 9
15	Sirius Satellite Radio 400	Michigan International Speedway, Brooklyn	June 16
16	Dodge/Save Mart 350	Infineon Raceway, Sonoma	June 23
17	Pepsi 400	Daytona International Speedway, Daytona Beach	July 6
18	Tropicana 400	Chicagoland Speedway, Joliet	July 14
19	New England 300	New Hampshire International Speedway, Loudon	July 21
20	Pennsylvania 500	Pocono Raceway, Long Pond	July 28
21	Brickyard 400	Indianapolis Motor Speedway, Speedway	August 4
22	Sirius Satellite Radio at The Glen	Watkins Glen International, Watkins Glen	August 11
23	Pepsi 400 presented by Farmer Jack	Michigan International Speedway, Brooklyn	August 18
24	Sharpie 500	Bristol Motor Speedway, Bristol	August 24
25	Mountain Dew Southern 500	Darlington Raceway, Darlington	September 1
26	Chevrolet Monte Carlo 400	Richmond International Raceway, Richmond	September 7
27	New Hampshire 300	New Hampshire International Speedway, Loudon	September 15
28	MBNA All-American Heroes 400	Dover International Speedway, Dover	September 22
29	Protection One 400	Kansas Speedway, Kansas City	September 29
30	EA Sports 500	Talladega Superspeedway, Talladega	October 6
31	UAW-GM Quality 500	Lowe's Motor Speedway, Concord	October 13
32	Old Dominion 500	Martinsville Speedway, Ridgeway	October 20
33	NAPA 500	Atlanta Motor Speedway, Hampton	October 27
34	Pop Secret Microwave Popcorn 400	North Carolina Speedway, Rockingham	November 3
35	Checker Auto Parts 500 presented by Pennzoil	Phoenix International Raceway, Phoenix	November 10
36	Ford 400	Homestead–Miami Speedway, Homestead	November 17

== Races ==
No.	Race	Pole position	Most laps led	Winning driver	Manufacturer
	Budweiser Shootout	Kurt Busch	Tony Stewart	Tony Stewart	Pontiac
	Gatorade 125#1	Jimmie Johnson	Jeff Gordon	Jeff Gordon	Chevrolet
	Gatorade 125#2	Kevin Harvick	Michael Waltrip	Michael Waltrip	Chevrolet
1	Daytona 500	Jimmie Johnson	Sterling Marlin	Ward Burton	Dodge
2	Subway 400	Ricky Craven	Matt Kenseth	Matt Kenseth	Ford
3	UAW-Daimler Chrysler 400	Todd Bodine	Tony Stewart	Sterling Marlin	Dodge
4	MBNA America 500	Bill Elliott	Tony Stewart	Tony Stewart	Pontiac
5	Carolina Dodge Dealers 400	Ricky Craven	Jeff Gordon	Sterling Marlin	Dodge
6	Food City 500	Jeff Gordon	Dale Earnhardt Jr.	Kurt Busch	Ford
7	Samsung/Radio Shack 500	Bill Elliott	Dale Jarrett	Matt Kenseth	Ford
8	Virginia 500	Jeff Gordon	Tony Stewart	Bobby Labonte	Pontiac
9	Aaron's 499	Jimmie Johnson	Dale Earnhardt Jr.	Dale Earnhardt Jr.	Chevrolet
10	NAPA Auto Parts 500	Ryan Newman	Kurt Busch	Jimmie Johnson	Chevrolet
11	Pontiac Excitement 400	Ward Burton	Ward Burton	Tony Stewart	Pontiac
	Winston Open	Jeremy Mayfield	Jeremy Mayfield	Jeremy Mayfield	Dodge
	No Bull Sprint	Ken Schrader	Ryan Newman	Ryan Newman	Ford
	The Winston	Matt Kenseth	Jimmie Johnson	Ryan Newman	Ford
12	Coca-Cola Racing Family 600	Jimmie Johnson	Jimmie Johnson	Mark Martin	Ford
13	MBNA Platinum 400	Matt Kenseth	Jimmie Johnson	Jimmie Johnson	Chevrolet
14	Pocono 500	Sterling Marlin	Ricky Rudd	Dale Jarrett	Ford
15	Sirius Satellite Radio 400	Dale Jarrett	Dale Jarrett	Matt Kenseth	Ford
16	Dodge/Save Mart 350	Tony Stewart	Jeff Gordon	Ricky Rudd	Ford
17	Pepsi 400	Kevin Harvick	Michael Waltrip	Michael Waltrip	Chevrolet
18	Tropicana 400	Ryan Newman	Ryan Newman	Kevin Harvick	Chevrolet
19	New England 300	Bill Elliott	Matt Kenseth	Ward Burton	Dodge
20	Pennsylvania 500	Bill Elliott	Sterling Marlin	Bill Elliott	Dodge
21	Brickyard 400	Tony Stewart	Bill Elliott	Bill Elliott	Dodge
22	Sirius Satellite Radio at The Glen	Ricky Rudd	Tony Stewart	Tony Stewart	Pontiac
23	Pepsi 400 presented by Farmer Jack	Dale Earnhardt Jr.	Kevin Harvick	Dale Jarrett	Ford
24	Sharpie 500	Jeff Gordon	Jeff Gordon	Jeff Gordon	Chevrolet
25	Mountain Dew Southern 500	Sterling Marlin	Jeff Gordon	Jeff Gordon	Chevrolet
26	Chevrolet Monte Carlo 400	Jimmie Johnson	Ryan Newman	Matt Kenseth	Ford
27	New Hampshire 300	Ryan Newman	Ryan Newman	Ryan Newman	Ford
28	MBNA All-American Heroes 400	Rusty Wallace	Jimmie Johnson	Jimmie Johnson	Chevrolet
29	Protection One 400	Dale Earnhardt Jr.	Jeff Gordon	Jeff Gordon	Chevrolet
30	EA Sports 500	Jimmie Johnson	Dale Earnhardt Jr.	Dale Earnhardt Jr.	Chevrolet
31	UAW-GM Quality 500	Tony Stewart	Jamie McMurray	Jamie McMurray	Dodge
32	Old Dominion 500	Ryan Newman	Ward Burton	Kurt Busch	Ford
33	NAPA 500	Tony Stewart	Kurt Busch	Kurt Busch	Ford
34	Pop Secret Microwave Popcorn 400	Ryan Newman	Mark Martin	Johnny Benson	Pontiac
35	Checker Auto Parts 500 presented by Pennzoil	Ryan Newman	Kurt Busch	Matt Kenseth	Ford
36	Ford 400	Kurt Busch	Joe Nemechek	Kurt Busch	Ford

=== Budweiser Shootout ===
The exhibition Budweiser Shootout race, for drivers that won a pole position in the previous season or previously won the event, was held on February 10 at Daytona International Speedway. Instead of qualifying, the starting lineup was decided by random draw. Kurt Busch started on the pole.

Top ten results

1. #20 - Tony Stewart
2. #8 - Dale Earnhardt Jr.
3. #24 - Jeff Gordon
4. #36 - Ken Schrader
5. #40 - Sterling Marlin
6. #88 - Dale Jarrett
7. #5 - Terry Labonte
8. #18 - Bobby Labonte
9. #1 - Kenny Wallace
10. #66 - Todd Bodine

=== Gatorade Twin 125s ===
The Gatorade 125s qualifying for the Daytona 500 were held on February 14 at Daytona International Speedway.

Race one: Top ten results

1. #24 - Jeff Gordon
2. #8 - Dale Earnhardt Jr.
3. #36 - Ken Schrader
4. #21 - Ricky Rudd
5. #5 - Terry Labonte
6. #40 - Sterling Marlin
7. #97 - Kurt Busch
8. #33 - Mike Wallace
9. #22 - Ward Burton
10. #88 - Dale Jarrett

Race two: Top ten results

1. #15 - Michael Waltrip
2. #20 - Tony Stewart
3. #25 - Jerry Nadeau
4. #29 - Kevin Harvick
5. #18 - Bobby Labonte
6. #31 - Robby Gordon
7. #71 - Dave Marcis
8. #43 - John Andretti
9. #1 - Kenny Wallace
10. #4 - Mike Skinner

=== Daytona 500 ===
The 2002 Daytona 500 was held on Sunday, February 17. Rookie Jimmie Johnson won the pole. This was the first Daytona 500 after the death of Dale Earnhardt.

Top ten results

1. #22 - Ward Burton
2. #21 - Elliott Sadler
3. #09 - Geoff Bodine
4. #97 - Kurt Busch
5. #15 - Michael Waltrip
6. #6 - Mark Martin
7. #12 - Ryan Newman
8. #40 - Sterling Marlin*
9. #24 - Jeff Gordon
10. #10 - Johnny Benson

Failed to qualify: #41-Jimmy Spencer, #23-Hut Stricklin, #44-Buckshot Jones, #16-Greg Biffle, #90-Rick Mast, #59-Bobby Gerhart, #02-Hermie Sadler, #85-Carl Long, #84-Norm Benning, #80-Kirk Shelmerdine

- This race had a bizarre ending. As the field took the restart with 5 laps to go, a multi-car accident involving 5 cars took place at the start/finish line when a driver missed a gear, bringing out the caution flag once again. Headed down the front straightaway going into turn 1, Sterling Marlin went to the inside of Jeff Gordon battling for the lead and when they made contact, Gordon's car was sent spinning. This incident pushed the fender of Marlin's car into his tire. Sterling Marlin would beat Ward Burton back to the caution flag for the lead. As the red flag was thrown to give crews time to clean up the race track to try and ensure a green flag finish, NASCAR reviewed Marlin's move as it appeared he had gone below the yellow line on the inside to pass Jeff Gordon, which is now illegal on NASCAR restrictor-plate tracks. While under the red flag, Marlin got out of his race car and started pulling on his fender, in violation of NASCAR's rule of working on the car under the red flag. This penalty sent Marlin back to the end of the line for the restart, giving Ward Burton the race lead for when they went back to the green flag.
- This was the first Daytona 500 victory for Dodge since Richard Petty won in 1974.
- As of 2020, this is the only Daytona 500 in NASCAR History that 2 sets of 3 brothers all raced against each other: The Wallaces (Rusty, Mike, & Kenny), and The Bodines (Geoff, Brett, & Todd). The eldest brother of each set (Rusty and Geoff), finished ahead of the younger brothers. The Wallaces finished 18th (Rusty), 21st (Mike), & 30th (Kenny). The Bodines finished 3rd (Geoff), 16th (Brett), & 31st (Todd). All 6 drivers saw the checkered flag and finished the race.
- Dave Marcis made his final career start in this race, starting 14th and finishing 42nd with a blown engine. This was Marcis' 33rd Daytona 500 start, a record that still stands today.

=== Subway 400 ===
The Subway 400 was held on February 24 at North Carolina Speedway. Ricky Craven won the pole.

1. #17 - Matt Kenseth
2. #40 - Sterling Marlin*
3. #18 - Bobby Labonte
4. #20 - Tony Stewart
5. #32 - Ricky Craven
6. #99 - Jeff Burton
7. #24 - Jeff Gordon
8. #2 - Rusty Wallace
9. #55 - Bobby Hamilton
10. #1 - Kenny Wallace

Failed to qualify: Dick Trickle (#71), Randy Renfrow (#59), Carl Long (#85)

- Sterling Marlin would take over the points lead, and he would hold the top spot for 25 consecutive weeks. He would lose the lead at Loudon in mid-September. As of 2020, his streak of 25 straight weeks would be the longest in history for a driver to not win a NASCAR championship.

=== UAW-Daimler Chrysler 400 ===
The UAW-DaimlerChrysler 400 was held on March 3 at Las Vegas Motor Speedway. Todd Bodine won the pole.

Top ten results

1. #40 - Sterling Marlin
2. #19 - Jeremy Mayfield
3. #6 - Mark Martin
4. #12 - Ryan Newman
5. #20 - Tony Stewart
6. #48 - Jimmie Johnson
7. #88 - Dale Jarrett
8. #9 - Bill Elliott
9. #99 - Jeff Burton
10. #41 - Jimmy Spencer

Failed to qualify: Derrike Cope (#57)

=== MBNA America 500 ===
The MBNA America 500 was held on March 10 at Atlanta Motor Speedway. Bill Elliott won the pole.

Top ten results

1. #20 - Tony Stewart
2. #8 - Dale Earnhardt Jr.
3. #48 - Jimmie Johnson
4. #17 - Matt Kenseth
5. #32 - Ricky Craven
6. #2 - Rusty Wallace
7. #22 - Ward Burton
8. #6 - Mark Martin
9. #40 - Sterling Marlin
10. #12 - Ryan Newman

Failed to qualify: Ron Hornaday Jr. (#57), Carl Long (#85)

- An incident in the previous race with a spin by Sterling Marlin led to a new rule change. After 11 years, NASCAR changed pit road speeding penalties; if a driver was caught speeding on the approach to the pit stall, the penalty was no longer 15 seconds; rather, the penalty was a pit pass-through, which also became the penalty for speeding on the pit exit, instead of a stop-and-go. The stop-and-go was used only for repeat violations.

=== Carolina Dodge Dealers 400 ===
The Carolina Dodge Dealers 400 was held on March 17 at Darlington Raceway. Ricky Craven won the pole.

Top ten results

1. #40 - Sterling Marlin*
2. #21 - Elliott Sadler
3. #29 - Kevin Harvick
4. #8 - Dale Earnhardt Jr.
5. #12 - Ryan Newman
6. #48 - Jimmie Johnson
7. #2 - Rusty Wallace
8. #17 - Matt Kenseth
9. #24 - Jeff Gordon
10. #9 - Bill Elliott

Failed to qualify: none

- Marlin had to start at the back after changing an engine in a happy hour. By the halfway point he was already in third place.
- Tony Stewart was shaken up after a grinding 11-car crash late in the race.
- Steve Park made his return to racing in this event after suffering injuries in the NASCAR Busch Series event at Darlington in September 2001. Park started a strong 4th, but crashed early and finished 39th.
- This was Marlin's last career Cup Series victory.

=== Food City 500 ===
The Food City 500 was held on March 24 at Bristol Motor Speedway. Jeff Gordon won the pole.

Top ten results

1. #97 - Kurt Busch*
2. #41 - Jimmy Spencer
3. #28 - Ricky Rudd
4. #8 - Dale Earnhardt Jr.*
5. #18 - Bobby Labonte
6. #17 - Matt Kenseth
7. #48 - Jimmie Johnson
8. #25 - Jerry Nadeau
9. #2 - Rusty Wallace
10. #29 - Kevin Harvick

Failed to qualify: none

- Tony Stewart started the race 13th and led 74 laps, but was replaced by Todd Bodine during a caution due to some pain sustained from the wreck at Darlington the previous week. Bodine was able to finish the race in 15th.
- This was Busch's first career victory and was the continuation of what would later become a very heated rivalry between him and Spencer, which started at Phoenix in November 2001. This was also the first of what would be four victories in the next five Bristol Cup races for Busch.
- After the race, a heated incident occurred on pit road with Robby Gordon and Dale Earnhardt Jr. from an incident earlier in the race when Earnhardt Jr. and Gordon, who was a lap down at the time, got together. At the end of the cool-down lap, Earnhardt Jr. ran into the side of Gordon's car entering pit road before Gordon retaliated by running into the back of him and turning him around in the middle of the pits.

=== Samsung/Radio Shack 500 ===
The Samsung/Radio Shack 500 was held at Texas Motor Speedway on April 8. Bill Elliott won the pole. The race was postponed from Sunday to Monday due to rain.

Top ten results

1. #17 - Matt Kenseth
2. #24 - Jeff Gordon
3. #6 - Mark Martin
4. #28 - Ricky Rudd
5. #20 - Tony Stewart
6. #48 - Jimmie Johnson
7. #40 - Sterling Marlin
8. #41 - Jimmy Spencer
9. #9 - Bill Elliott
10. #5 - Terry Labonte

Failed to qualify: Ron Hornaday Jr. (#57)

=== Virginia 500 ===
The Virginia 500 was held at Martinsville Speedway on April 14. Jeff Gordon won the pole.

Top ten results

1. #18 - Bobby Labonte*
2. #17 - Matt Kenseth
3. #88 - Dale Jarrett
4. #20 - Tony Stewart
5. #8 - Dale Earnhardt Jr.
6. #5 - Terry Labonte
7. #28 - Ricky Rudd
8. #6 - Mark Martin
9. #99 - Jeff Burton
10. #97 - Kurt Busch

Failed to qualify: Randy Renfrow (#59)

- Kevin Harvick was ejected due to reckless driving in the Advance Auto Parts 250 Truck Series race the day before when he intentionally wrecked driver Coy Gibbs. Kenny Wallace drove the #29 in his place. Harvick was previously on probation for an incident at Bristol with Greg Biffle in the Busch Series race, leading to NASCAR's ejection.
- This was Labonte's first and only Cup Series victory on a short track.

=== Aaron's 499 ===
The Aaron's 499 was held at Talladega Superspeedway on April 21. Jimmie Johnson won the pole.

Top ten results

1. #8 - Dale Earnhardt Jr.
2. #15 - Michael Waltrip
3. #97 - Kurt Busch
4. #24 - Jeff Gordon
5. #40 - Sterling Marlin
6. #88 - Dale Jarrett
7. #48 - Jimmie Johnson
8. #2 - Rusty Wallace
9. #99 - Jeff Burton
10. #45 - Kyle Petty

Failed to qualify: Shawna Robinson (#49), Rick Mast (#90), Bobby Gerhart (#59), Dick Trickle (#91)

- The "Big One" took out at least 24 cars on lap 164.

=== NAPA Auto Parts 500 ===
The NAPA Auto Parts 500 was held at California Speedway on April 28. Ryan Newman won the pole.

Top ten results

1. #48 - Jimmie Johnson*
2. #97 - Kurt Busch
3. #28 - Ricky Rudd
4. #9 - Bill Elliott
5. #6 - Mark Martin
6. #88 - Dale Jarrett
7. #40 - Sterling Marlin
8. #2 - Rusty Wallace
9. #77 - Dave Blaney
10. #15 - Michael Waltrip

Failed to qualify: Brendan Gaughan (No. 62), Chad Little (No. 74), Hermie Sadler (No. 02)

- Dale Earnhardt Jr. was involved in a hard crash when Kevin Harvick cut down a tire and hit Earnhardt's car, sending him head-on into the outside wall. He suffered a severe concussion, but kept the injury a secret for several months and did not miss any races. This is now prohibited because of Earnhardt's 2012 admission of concussions after a Talladega crash in the playoffs. Current rules require drivers to pass concussion protocol after incidents.
- The win was Johnson's first career Winston Cup victory.
- Greg Biffle made his Cup Series debut in this race, driving a fifth Roush Racing entry. Biffle started 29th and finished 13th.

=== Pontiac Excitement 400 ===
The Pontiac Excitement 400 was scheduled to be run at Richmond International Raceway on Saturday night on May 4th, but rain ended up stopping the race after 66 laps; the remainder was run the next day. Ward Burton won the pole.

Top ten results

1. #20 - Tony Stewart
2. #12 - Ryan Newman
3. #99 - Jeff Burton
4. #6 - Mark Martin
5. #19 - Jeremy Mayfield
6. #17 - Matt Kenseth
7. #24 - Jeff Gordon
8. #44 - Steve Grissom
9. #32 - Ricky Craven
10. #41 - Jimmy Spencer

Failed to qualify: Kevin Grubb (#54)

- Jerry Nadeau would part ways with Hendrick Motorsports after this race. In his last start with the team, Nadeau crashed out and finished 41st. Joe Nemechek would drive the #25 Chevy for the rest of the season.
- Joe Nemechek replaced Johnny Benson in the #10 Pontiac in this race after Benson suffered broken ribs in a Busch Series accident the night before. Jerry Nadeau would drive the car for the next three weeks.
- This race marked the final career start for Rick Mast.
- Following the death of TLC band member Lisa "Left Eye" Lopes in a car accident, autopsy photos of the accident were leaked to the media. As a similar controversy had taken place following autopsy photos following Dale Earnhardt's death, the Dale Earnhardt, Inc. drivers (Dale Earnhardt Jr.; Michael Waltrip and Steve Park) painted a single black stripe next to the left headlight decal of their cars as both a tribute to Lopes and an act of protest of the leaked photos.

=== The Winston ===
Ryan Newman held off Dale Earnhardt Jr. to win The Winston. He also won the No Bull 5 Sprint earlier that day.

Winston Open: Top five results

1. #19 - Jeremy Mayfield
2. #36 - Ken Schrader
3. #12 - Ryan Newman
4. #23 - Hut Stricklin
5. #45 - Kyle Petty

No Bull Sprint: Top five results

1. #12 - Ryan Newman
2. #45 - Kyle Petty
3. #36 - Ken Schrader
4. #23 - Hut Stricklin
5. #41 - Jimmy Spencer

The Winston: Top ten results

1. #12 - Ryan Newman
2. #8 - Dale Earnhardt Jr.
3. #17 - Matt Kenseth
4. #97 - Kurt Busch
5. #48 - Jimmie Johnson
6. #20 - Tony Stewart
7. #31 - Robby Gordon
8. #29 - Kevin Harvick
9. #32 - Ricky Craven
10. #9 - Bill Elliott

=== Coca-Cola Racing Family 600 ===
The Coca-Cola Racing Family 600 was held at Lowe's Motor Speedway on May 26. Jimmie Johnson won the pole.

Top ten results

1. #6 - Mark Martin*
2. #17 - Matt Kenseth
3. #32 - Ricky Craven
4. #28 - Ricky Rudd*
5. #24 - Jeff Gordon
6. #20 - Tony Stewart
7. #48 - Jimmie Johnson*
8. #15 - Michael Waltrip
9. #9 - Bill Elliott
10. #2 - Rusty Wallace

Failed to qualify: Chad Little (#74), Carl Long (#85), Derrike Cope (#37), Randy Renfrow (#59)

- Jimmie Johnson led a race-high 263 laps, but spun out Hut Stricklin in turn 3 while leading on lap 359, bringing out the final caution. Johnson dropped to 9th on the restart, while Martin won the race off pit road and led the rest of the way.
- This was Mark Martin's first win in 73 races since Martinsville back in April 2000. Not only did Martin snap his winless drought, but he also won his first and only Winston No Bull 5 Million Dollar Bonus in his 9th attempt. He became eligible for this race after finishing in the Top 5 at Las Vegas two months prior. He is also the first and only driver not named Jeff or Dale to win the bonus.
- In this race, Ricky Rudd would become NASCAR's new Iron Man by making his 656th consecutive start, passing Terry Labonte's record of 655 starts. Rudd's streak would end in November 2005 with 788 consecutive starts, a record that would stand until being broken by Jeff Gordon in September 2015.

=== MBNA Platinum 400 ===
The MBNA Platinum 400 was held at Dover International Speedway on June 2. Matt Kenseth won the pole position.

Top ten results

1. #48 - Jimmie Johnson
2. #9 - Bill Elliott
3. #99 - Jeff Burton
4. #12 - Ryan Newman
5. #88 - Dale Jarrett
6. #24 - Jeff Gordon
7. #32 - Ricky Craven
8. #31 - Robby Gordon
9. #55 - Bobby Hamilton
10. #21 - Elliott Sadler

Failed to qualify: Derrike Cope (#37), Hermie Sadler (#90), Randy Renfrow (#59)

=== Pocono 500 ===
The Pocono 500 was held at Pocono Raceway on June 9. Qualifying was rained out, so points leader Sterling Marlin started on the pole.

Top ten results

1. #88 - Dale Jarrett
2. #6 - Mark Martin
3. #48 - Jimmie Johnson
4. #40 - Sterling Marlin
5. #24 - Jeff Gordon
6. #99 - Jeff Burton
7. #20 - Tony Stewart
8. #15 - Michael Waltrip
9. #2 - Rusty Wallace
10. #77 - Dave Blaney

Failed to qualify: none

=== Sirius 400 ===
The Sirius 400 was held at Michigan International Speedway on June 16. Dale Jarrett won the pole.

Top ten results

1. #17 - Matt Kenseth
2. #88 - Dale Jarrett
3. #12 - Ryan Newman
4. #15 - Michael Waltrip
5. #24 - Jeff Gordon
6. #10 - Johnny Benson
7. #2 - Rusty Wallace
8. #28 - Ricky Rudd
9. #6 - Mark Martin
10. #97 - Kurt Busch

Failed to qualify: none

=== Dodge/Save Mart 350 ===
The Dodge/Save Mart 350 was held at Infineon Raceway on June 23. Tony Stewart won the pole.

Top ten results

1. #28 - Ricky Rudd*
2. #20 - Tony Stewart
3. #5 - Terry Labonte
4. #97 - Kurt Busch
5. #30 - Jeff Green
6. #21 - Elliott Sadler
7. #6 - Mark Martin
8. #9 - Bill Elliott
9. #12 - Ryan Newman
10. #43 - John Andretti

Failed to qualify: Brandon Ash (#46), Stacy Compton (#14)

- Jerry Nadeau nearly won the race when his rear-end gear failed, causing him to stop his #44 car with less than 3 laps to go. The lead changed to Ricky Rudd, who held on to win.
- This was Ricky Rudd's first win at Sonoma since winning the inaugural race in 1989.
- This was Rudd's last career Cup series victory.

=== Pepsi 400 ===
The Pepsi 400 was held at Daytona International Speedway on July 6. Kevin Harvick won the pole.

Top ten results

1. #15 - Michael Waltrip
2. #2 - Rusty Wallace
3. #40 - Sterling Marlin
4. #41 - Jimmy Spencer
5. #6 - Mark Martin
6. #8 - Dale Earnhardt Jr.
7. #26 - Todd Bodine
8. #48 - Jimmie Johnson
9. #22 - Ward Burton
10. #09 - Geoff Bodine

Failed to qualify: Ed Berrier (#90), Steve Grissom (#44)

- The Big One occurred with 25 laps remaining when Dale Jarrett got down low and spun back up into traffic, blocking the entire track and collecting 13 other cars.
- Fox was airing MLB regional games that day, and both of the scheduled late afternoon games ran long. Viewers who had been watching the FOX telecast of the San Francisco Giants/Arizona Diamondbacks game (Giants won 3-2) joined this race just in time for the green flag to start. Those who were watching the Los Angeles Dodgers/St. Louis Cardinals game (Dodgers won 4-2 in 11 innings) joined the race under caution on lap 4.
- Johnny Benson was involved in a hard crash on lap 8, rebreaking the ribs he broke at Richmond in May, and forcing him to miss two more races.

=== Tropicana 400 ===
The Tropicana 400 was held at Chicagoland Speedway on July 14. Ryan Newman won the pole.

Top ten results

1. #29 - Kevin Harvick*
2. #24 - Jeff Gordon
3. #20 - Tony Stewart
4. #48 - Jimmie Johnson
5. #12 - Ryan Newman
6. #97 - Kurt Busch
7. #9 - Bill Elliott
8. #31 - Robby Gordon
9. #6 - Mark Martin
10. #8 - Dale Earnhardt Jr.

Failed to qualify: Ron Hornaday Jr. (#49), Kirk Shelmerdine (#72), Tony Raines (#74), Scott Wimmer (#27)

- One lap after the restart with 70 laps to go, Kevin Harvick steered the car to the apron and made a good pass but he lost it when passing on the apron and spun out into the grass in turn 1 that caused three other cars to lose control and spin out. He took the lead just 46 laps later and had enough gas to win the race for the second straight year and end a 35-race winless streak.

=== New England 300 ===
The New England 300 was held at New Hampshire International Speedway on July 21. Bill Elliott won the pole.

Top ten results

1. #22 - Ward Burton*
2. #30 - Jeff Green
3. #88 - Dale Jarrett
4. #2 - Rusty Wallace
5. #12 - Ryan Newman
6. #26 - Todd Bodine
7. #31 - Robby Gordon
8. #97 - Kurt Busch
9. #29 - Kevin Harvick
10. #21 - Elliott Sadler

Failed to qualify: none

- This was the final Cup Series victory for Ward Burton, and for Bill Davis Racing.
- With this win and the Daytona 500 win, 2002 was the only season in Ward Burton's career that he won multiple races in a season.
- Matt Kenseth dominated the last part of the race, as well as leading the most laps, but ended up with a flat tire while leading with 10 laps to go, and unfortunately finished 33rd, the last car one lap down.

=== Pennsylvania 500 ===
The Pennsylvania 500 was held at Pocono Raceway on July 28. Bill Elliott swept both qualifying and the race. The race was shortened to 175 laps due to darkness, because of two lengthy red flags – one for rain and one for fence repairs after Steve Park (who barrel-rolled multiple times) and Dale Earnhardt Jr. wrecked on the first lap.

Top ten results

1. #9 - Bill Elliott
2. #97 - Kurt Busch
3. #40 - Sterling Marlin
4. #88 - Dale Jarrett
5. #12 - Ryan Newman
6. #29 - Kevin Harvick
7. #20 - Tony Stewart
8. #17 - Matt Kenseth
9. #5 - Terry Labonte
10. #28 - Ricky Rudd

Failed to qualify: Carl Long (#79)

=== Brickyard 400 ===
The Brickyard 400 was held at Indianapolis Motor Speedway on August 4. Tony Stewart won the pole. This was the first race to feature Steel and Foam Energy Reduction (SAFER) barrier at Indianapolis that was used to make racing accidents safer.

Top ten results

1. #9 - Bill Elliott
2. #2 - Rusty Wallace
3. #17 - Matt Kenseth
4. #12 - Ryan Newman
5. #29 - Kevin Harvick
6. #24 - Jeff Gordon
7. #1 - Steve Park
8. #31 - Robby Gordon
9. #48 - Jimmie Johnson
10. #88 - Dale Jarrett

Failed to qualify: Ron Hornaday Jr. (#49), Derrike Cope (#37), Scott Wimmer (#27), Tony Raines (#74), Jim Sauter (#71), Stuart Kirby (#57), P. J. Jones (#50)

- Tony Stewart is the only driver to start at the pole in both the Indianapolis 500 and the Brickyard 400.

=== Sirius Satellite Radio at The Glen ===
The Sirius Satellite Radio at The Glen was held at Watkins Glen International on August 11. Ricky Rudd won the pole.

Top ten results

1. #20 - Tony Stewart
2. #12 - Ryan Newman
3. #31 - Robby Gordon
4. #14 - P. J. Jones
5. #28 - Ricky Rudd
6. #41 - Scott Pruett*
7. #99 - Jeff Burton
8. #26 - Todd Bodine
9. #15 - Michael Waltrip
10. #6 - Mark Martin

Failed to qualify: Austin Cameron (#62), Shane Lewis (#09), Justin Bell (#46), Jimmy Spencer (#42)

- Tony Stewart led the most laps with 34. Robby Gordon controlled the race early leading for 21 laps. On the final restart, Tony Stewart appeared to have restarted too early and despite this won the race. A cloud of controversy over the restart tainted the finish of the race. Ryan Newman's team owner Roger Penske protested, but Stewart's win was upheld by officials days later.
- Scott Pruett picked up his career-best finish at that point in time, substituting for Jimmy Spencer, who DNQ'd in a third Chip Ganassi entry.

=== Pepsi 400 presented by Farmer Jack ===
The Pepsi 400 presented by Farmer Jack was held at Michigan International Speedway on August 18. Dale Earnhardt Jr. won the pole.

Top ten results

1. #88 - Dale Jarrett
2. #20 - Tony Stewart
3. #29 - Kevin Harvick
4. #99 - Jeff Burton
5. #6 - Mark Martin
6. #40 - Sterling Marlin
7. #48 - Jimmie Johnson
8. #10 - Johnny Benson
9. #30 - Jeff Green
10. #8 - Dale Earnhardt Jr.

Failed to qualify: Greg Biffle (#16)

- Melling Racing made its last Cup Series start in this race, starting 23rd and finishing 30th with Stacy Compton.

=== Sharpie 500 ===
The Sharpie 500 was held at Bristol Motor Speedway on August 24. Jeff Gordon won the pole.

Top ten results

1. #24 - Jeff Gordon
2. #2 - Rusty Wallace
3. #8 - Dale Earnhardt Jr.
4. #29 - Kevin Harvick
5. #17 - Matt Kenseth
6. #97 - Kurt Busch
7. #40 - Sterling Marlin
8. #41 - Jimmy Spencer
9. #18 - Bobby Labonte
10. #14 - Mike Wallace

Failed to qualify: Hermie Sadler (#02), Carl Long (#51), Morgan Shepherd (#89), Tim Sauter (#71)

- This race is remembered for Jeff Gordon using the "Bump and Run" to get underneath and past Rusty Wallace to end a winless drought that dated back to the end of 2001.
- The race was also marred with on-track confrontations, including Ward Burton who threw heel pads at Dale Earnhardt Jr. after Earnhardt Jr. wrecked him on lap 405. Robby Gordon was also penalized for two laps after spinning out Jimmie Johnson on a restart.

=== Mountain Dew Southern 500 ===
The Mountain Dew Southern 500 was held at Darlington Raceway on September 1. Qualifying was rained out, so points leader Sterling Marlin started on the pole.

Top ten results

1. #24 - Jeff Gordon*
2. #12 - Ryan Newman
3. #9 - Bill Elliott
4. #40 - Sterling Marlin
5. #88 - Dale Jarrett
6. #22 - Ward Burton
7. #97 - Kurt Busch
8. #20 - Tony Stewart
9. #48 - Jimmie Johnson
10. #99 - Jeff Burton

Failed to qualify: Carl Long (#51)

- With this win, Jeff Gordon would tie Cale Yarborough as a 5-time winner of the Southern 500, the most of all drivers.
- Jeff Gordon would become the 7th driver in NASCAR history to win 60+ NASCAR races.

=== Chevrolet Monte Carlo 400 ===
The Chevrolet Monte Carlo 400 was held at Richmond International Raceway on September 7. Jimmie Johnson won the pole.

Top ten results

1. #17 - Matt Kenseth
2. #12 - Ryan Newman
3. #30 - Jeff Green
4. #8 - Dale Earnhardt Jr.
5. #26 - Todd Bodine
6. #6 - Mark Martin
7. #28 - Ricky Rudd
8. #22 - Ward Burton 1 lap down
9. #77 - Dave Blaney 1 lap down
10. #19 - Jeremy Mayfield 1 lap down

Failed to qualify: Carl Long (#51)

- Bobby Hamilton suffered injuries in the Craftsman Truck Series race held the Thursday before and would miss the next five Cup races. Greg Biffle drove Hamilton's #55 for the first four races while Ron Hornaday Jr. drove in the fifth.
- There was a charity golf cart race sponsored by Students Against Violence which teamed the drivers with their respective Looney Tunes character, Jeff Green won the race paired with Daffy Duck. Jeff Gordon fell out of his golf cart and suffered a bruised hand but still participated in the race.
- During the pre-race, the pace car blew an engine and laid oil down turns 3 and 4. On the first few laps, several drivers went sliding and Jeff Burton, Jimmy Spencer, and Sterling Marlin, the points leader and competing in the No Bull wrecked on lap 7. Marlin would suffer several injuries from that wreck but raced until Kansas when a more serious injury occurred.

=== New Hampshire 300 ===
The New Hampshire 300 was held at New Hampshire International Speedway on September 15. Ryan Newman won the pole. The race was shortened to 207 laps due to rain.

Top ten results

1. #12 - Ryan Newman*
2. #97 - Kurt Busch
3. #20 - Tony Stewart
4. #10 - Johnny Benson
5. #18 - Bobby Labonte
6. #32 - Ricky Craven
7. #88 - Dale Jarrett
8. #15 - Michael Waltrip
9. #48 - Jimmie Johnson
10. #17 - Matt Kenseth

Failed to qualify: Carl Long (#51)

- This was Ryan Newman's first career Cup Series points victory
- After finishing 21st, Sterling Marlin would lose the points lead for the first time after leading the standings for 25 consecutive weeks. As of 2020, his streak of 25 straight weeks would be the longest in history for a driver to not win a NASCAR championship. Mark Martin would lead the points following this race.

=== MBNA All-American Heroes 400 ===
The MBNA All-American Heroes 400 was held at Dover International Speedway on September 22. Rusty Wallace won the pole.

Top ten results

1. #48 - Jimmie Johnson
2. #6 - Mark Martin
3. #88 - Dale Jarrett
4. #17 - Matt Kenseth
5. #20 - Tony Stewart
6. #99 - Jeff Burton
7. #97 - Kurt Busch
8. #12 - Ryan Newman
9. #32 - Ricky Craven 1 lap down
10. #10 - Johnny Benson 1 lap down

Failed to qualify: Scott Wimmer (#27), Brett Bodine (#11), Morgan Shepherd (#51)

- Hideo Fukuyama made his Cup series debut in this race, becoming the first Japanese driver to start a NASCAR Cup Series points race.
- With this victory, Johnson ties Tony Stewart's record for most wins in a season as a rookie in the Cup series, with three.

=== Protection One 400 ===
The Protection One 400 was held at Kansas Speedway on September 29. Dale Earnhardt Jr. won the pole.

Top ten results

1. #24 - Jeff Gordon
2. #12 - Ryan Newman
3. #2 - Rusty Wallace
4. #25 - Joe Nemechek
5. #9 - Bill Elliott
6. #8 - Dale Earnhardt Jr.
7. #17 - Matt Kenseth
8. #20 - Tony Stewart
9. #19 - Jeremy Mayfield
10. #48 - Jimmie Johnson 1 lap down

Failed to qualify: Brett Bodine (#11), Kirk Shelmerdine (#27), Carl Long (#51)

- On lap 148, Sterling Marlin crashed hard into the outside wall exiting turn 2. Although he was checked and released from the infield care center, Marlin was later diagnosed with a neck injury that would cause him to miss the rest of the season.
- Points leader Mark Martin finished 25th with a blown engine, handing the points lead to Jimmie Johnson, the first time that a Rookie driver has led the points standings in NASCAR history.

=== EA Sports 500 ===
The EA Sports 500 was held at Talladega Superspeedway on October 6. Qualifying was rained out, so points leader Jimmie Johnson started on the pole. The race was caution-free for the third time in five years at Talladega.

Top ten results

1. #8 - Dale Earnhardt Jr.
2. #20 - Tony Stewart
3. #28 - Ricky Rudd
4. #97 - Kurt Busch
5. #30 - Jeff Green
6. #1 - Steve Park
7. #12 - Ryan Newman
8. #15 - Michael Waltrip
9. #88 - Dale Jarrett
10. #22 - Ward Burton

Failed to qualify: Morgan Shepherd (#51), Geoff Bodine (#09), Robert Pressley (#92)*, Kerry Earnhardt (#83)

- In a bizarre event, during the pace laps, Mark Martin had a steering problem and crashed into Jimmie Johnson. Martin was black-flagged prior to the race start so NASCAR could verify his steering was working properly, while Johnson did not pit until the conclusion of the first green flag lap. Due to the caution free race, neither driver was able to recover from the incident.
- Jamie McMurray began driving duties for Sterling Marlin in this race. This was his first career start. He finished in 26th
- All Hendrick Motorsports engines failed during the race (Jeff Gordon, Joe Nemechek, Jimmie Johnson, Terry Labonte, as well as the Hendrick affiliated cars of Johnny Benson and Ken Schrader)
- With both Johnson and Martin having problems, Tony Stewart would take the points lead for the first time after this race.
- As of 2018, this would be the last time ever that a NASCAR Cup race would go flag to flag green (or caution free).
- Pressley's DNQ marked the last appearance of Melling Racing in NASCAR, as the team would never attempt another race, and would shut down in 2003.
- This was the final race for the Winston No Bull 5 program.

=== UAW-GM Quality 500 ===
The UAW-GM Quality 500 was held at Lowe's Motor Speedway on October 13. Qualifying was rained out, so points leader Tony Stewart started on the pole. Jamie McMurray, subbing for an injured Sterling Marlin, won his first race in his second career start.

Top ten results

1. #40 - Jamie McMurray
2. #18 - Bobby Labonte
3. #20 - Tony Stewart
4. #24 - Jeff Gordon
5. #2 - Rusty Wallace
6. #48 - Jimmie Johnson
7. #99 - Jeff Burton
8. #12 - Ryan Newman
9. #8 - Dale Earnhardt Jr.
10. #77 - Dave Blaney

Failed to qualify: Carl Long (#59), Kirk Shelmerdine (#72), Scott Wimmer (#27), Jack Sprague (#60), Kerry Earnhardt (#83), Ron Hornaday Jr. (#54)

- Rain caused the start of the race to be delayed over 3 hours. After the rain stopped, NASCAR decided to start the race under yellow for the first 5 laps as the track continued to dry.
- The late finish contributed to a large jump in ratings for the NBC telecast. NASCAR decided to move the fall race at Charlotte from Sunday afternoon to Saturday night for 2003.
- This race marked the last start for Donlavey Racing in a Cup Series points race, finishing in last place with driver Jason Hedlesky.

=== Old Dominion 500 ===
The Old Dominion 500 was held at Martinsville Speedway on October 20. Ryan Newman won the pole.

Top ten results

1. #97 - Kurt Busch
2. #10 - Johnny Benson
3. #28 - Ricky Rudd
4. #8 - Dale Earnhardt Jr.
5. #22 - Ward Burton
6. #48 - Jimmie Johnson
7. #32 - Ricky Craven
8. #88 - Dale Jarrett
9. #2 - Rusty Wallace
10. #6 - Mark Martin

Failed to qualify: Brian Rose (#51), Carl Long (#59), Morgan Shepherd (#89), Ryan McGlynn (#80), Kirk Shelmerdine (#27)

=== NAPA 500 ===
The NAPA 500 was held at Atlanta Motor Speedway on October 27. Qualifying was rained out, so points leader Tony Stewart started on the pole. The race was shortened to 248 laps due to rain.

Top ten results

1. #97 - Kurt Busch
2. #25 - Joe Nemechek
3. #88 - Dale Jarrett
4. #20 - Tony Stewart
5. #8 - Dale Earnhardt Jr.
6. #24 - Jeff Gordon
7. #40 - Jamie McMurray
8. #6 - Mark Martin
9. #17 - Matt Kenseth
10. #12 - Ryan Newman

Failed to qualify: Geoff Bodine (#09), Frank Kimmel (#66), Scott Wimmer (#27), Greg Biffle (#16), Buckshot Jones (#00), Jack Sprague (#60), Kerry Earnhardt (#83), Ron Hornaday Jr. (#54)

=== Pop Secret Microwave Popcorn 400 ===
The Pop Secret Microwave Popcorn 400 was held at North Carolina Speedway on November 3. Ryan Newman won the pole.

Top ten results

1. #10 - Johnny Benson*
2. #6 - Mark Martin*
3. #97 - Kurt Busch
4. #99 - Jeff Burton
5. #24 - Jeff Gordon
6. #4 - Mike Skinner
7. #18 - Bobby Labonte
8. #17 - Matt Kenseth
9. #32 - Ricky Craven
10. #30 - Jeff Green

Failed to qualify: Tony Raines (#74), Tim Sauter (#71), Carl Long (#59), Ron Hornaday Jr. (#54), Hideo Fukuyama (#66)

- This would be Johnny Benson's only Winston Cup Series win.
- Mark Martin failed post-race inspection after an illegal left front spring was discovered. Martin was penalized 25 driver points, and Jack Roush was penalized 25 owner points.
- First win for MB2 Motorsports.

=== Checker Auto Parts 500 ===
The Checker Auto Parts 500 was held at Phoenix International Raceway on November 10. Ryan Newman won the pole.

Top ten results

1. #17 - Matt Kenseth
2. #2 - Rusty Wallace
3. #24 - Jeff Gordon
4. #6 - Mark Martin*
5. #8 - Dale Earnhardt Jr.
6. #97 - Kurt Busch
7. #77 - Dave Blaney
8. #20 - Tony Stewart*
9. #88 - Dale Jarrett
10. #21 - Elliott Sadler

Failed to qualify: Ted Musgrave (#07), Jack Sprague (#60), Brett Bodine (#11), Jerry Robertson (#51), Morgan Shepherd (#89), Jeff Jefferson (#37), Lance Hooper (#47), Mike Harmon (#93)

- Tony Stewart left Phoenix with an 89-point lead over Mark Martin. Stewart had to finish 22nd or better to clinch his first championship the following week at Homestead if Martin led the most laps and won the race.
- Mark Martin's appeal to regain the 25 points back from his penalty at Rockingham was denied during qualifying for the following race at Homestead, the season finale. If the penalty was withdrawn, the points gap between Stewart and Martin would've been 64 points.

=== Ford 400 ===
The Ford 400 was held at Homestead–Miami Speedway on November 17. Kurt Busch won the pole.

Top ten results

1. #97 - Kurt Busch
2. #25 - Joe Nemechek
3. #99 - Jeff Burton
4. #6 - Mark Martin
5. #24 - Jeff Gordon
6. #12 - Ryan Newman
7. #9 - Bill Elliott
8. #48 - Jimmie Johnson
9. #21 - Elliott Sadler
10. #55 - Bobby Hamilton

Failed to qualify: David Green (#54), Brett Bodine (#11), Hermie Sadler (#02), Tony Raines (#74), Boris Said (#67), Carl Long (#59), Geoff Bodine (#09), Mike Harmon (#93)

- Tony Stewart clinched the 2002 NASCAR Winston Cup Championship after finishing in 18th place, the lowest for a driver to win the championship in the season finale since 1995 when Jeff Gordon finished 32nd.
- Tony Stewart would be the last driver to win the championship in the season finale before the Playoffs Era.
- 2002 would be the last time in NASCAR history that a driver would win the title with less than 5,000 points to his total. 2002 would also be the only season in the 36 race era (2001–Present) that a driver won the title with less than 5,000 points.
- As of 2026, Tony Stewart is the only driver in NASCAR history to win the championship after finishing last in the first race of the season (43rd in the Daytona 500).
- After 16 straight seasons with at least one victory from 1986 to 2001, Rusty Wallace failed to keep his winning streak alive in 2002.

== Full Drivers' Championship ==
(key) Bold – Pole position awarded by time. Italics – Pole position set by owner's points. * – Most laps led.

Pos	Driver	DAY	CAR	LVS	ATL	DAR	BRI	TEX	MAR	TAL	CAL	RCH	CLT	DOV	POC	MCH	SON	DAY	CHI	NHA	POC	IND	GLN	MCH	BRI	DAR	RCH	NHA	DOV	KAN	TAL	CLT	MAR	ATL	CAR	PHO	HOM	Points
1	Tony Stewart	43	4	5	1*	36	15	5	3*	29	29	1	6	11	7	16	**2**	39	3	39	7	**12**	1*	2	24	8	30	3	5	8	2	3	11	4	14	8	18	4800
2	Mark Martin	6	21	3	8	29	11	3	8	37	5	4	1	41	2	9	7	5	9	16	13	28	10	5	23	11	6	16	2	25	30	16	10	8	2*	4	4	4762
3	Kurt Busch	4	12	20	11	28	1	23	10	3	2*	27	31	12	40	10	4*	31	6	8	2	41	41	39	6	7	19	2	7	31	4	12	1	1*	3	6*	**1**	4641
4	Jeff Gordon	9	7	17	16	9	**31**	2	**23**	4	16	7	5	6	5	5	37	22	2	29	12	6	22	19	**1***	1*	40	14	37	1*	42	4	36	6	5	3	5	4607
5	Jimmie Johnson **(R)**	**15**	28	6	3	6	7	6	35	**7**	1	31	**7***	1*	3	14	35	8	4	15	15	9	16	7	34	9	**13**	9	1*	10	37	6	6	22	37	15	8	4600
6	Ryan Newman **(R)**	7	14	4	10	5	37	40	41	43	**14**	2	41	4	32	3	9	27	**5***	5	5	4	2	31	36	2	2*	**1***	8	2	7	8	**15**	10	**23**	**18**	6	4593
7	Rusty Wallace	18	8	11	6	7	9	11	16	8	8	25	10	17	9	7	27	2	25	4	40	2	17	24	2	22	15	19	**15**	3	13	5	9	17	27	2	14	4574
8	Matt Kenseth	33	1*	14	4	8	6	1	2	30	20	6	2	**40**	35	1	39	30	14	33*	8	3	33	11	5	37	1	10	4	7	14	34	19	9	8	1	40	4432
9	Dale Jarrett	14	42	7	13	40	29	24*	4	6	6	38	19	5	1	**2***	15	35	11	3	4	10	37	1	28	5	31	7	3	39	9	14	8	3	12	9	15	4415
10	Ricky Rudd	38	18	13	20	12	3	4	7	14	3	39	4	19	17	8	1	15	19	17	10	18	**5**	12	39	30	7	12	14	20	3	39	3	32	20	13	19	4323
11	Dale Earnhardt Jr.	29	26	16	2	4	4*	42	5	1*	36	36	35	30	12	22	30	6	10	23	37	22	35	**10**	3	16	4	11	24	**6**	1*	9	4	5	34	5	21	4270
12	Jeff Burton	12	6	9	21	11	26	39	9	9	19	3	40	3	6	20	29	33	39	12	16	29	7	4	13	10	39	20	6	29	11	7	17	12	4	12	3	4259
13	Bill Elliott	11	11	8	**35**	10	21	**9**	31	19	4	14	9	2	30	11	8	17	7	**34**	**1**	1*	21	22	17	3	16	23	18	5	19	35	42	33	39	30	7	4158
14	Michael Waltrip	5	40	22	40	15	30	28	13	2	10	24	8	21	8	4	22	1*	42	20	18	16	9	15	22	24	36	8	12	26	8	11	18	11	19	20	41	3985
15	Ricky Craven	17	**5**	31	5	**41**	13	14	30	18	37	9	3	7	14	15	19	23	20	21	17	33	34	17	16	14	21	6	9	38	15	36	7	21	9	34	24	3888
16	Bobby Labonte	34	3	12	37	21	5	30	1	41	34	32	14	16	25	24	13	32	18	13	11	11	23	13	9	15	32	5	41	22	25	2	12	13	7	39	29	3810
17	Jeff Green	19	17	33	41	25	27	16	22	16	11	13	20	38	34	18	5	21	12	2	26	19	12	9	35	12	3	26	13	17	5	29	32	24	10	35	38	3704
18	Sterling Marlin	8*	2	1	9	1	19	7	12	5	7	11	11	13	4	21	43	3	16	14	3*	27	30	6	7	4	43	21	21	33								3703
19	Dave Blaney	25	22	18	17	30	17	15	17	31	9	29	21	29	10	13	20	28	17	35	22	15	18	18	33	29	9	25	11	21	31	10	20	19	17	7	43	3670
20	Robby Gordon	13	24	37	18	34	20	41	34	33	12	37	16	8	19	33	11	29	8	7	25	8	3	21	20	17	28	17	17	13	12	38	23	20	11	27	26	3632
21	Kevin Harvick	36	19	25	39	3	10	25	QL	28	35	40	34	28	39	27	14	**11**	1	9	6	5	14	3	4	40	18	33	30	11	27	22	31	40	26	17	20	3501
22	Kyle Petty	41	37	30	15	14	12	21	20	10	17	23	13	20	13	12	17	19	24	37	27	25	29	27	15	13	17	39	16	15	16	20	37	14	30	32	31	3501
23	Elliott Sadler	2	31	28	19	2	41	17	28	40	39	21	33	10	15	26	6	12	21	10	21	35	43	27	42	19	34	35	25	18	36	19	34	18	16	10	9	3418
24	Terry Labonte	20	16	38	14	23	16	10	6	20	21	33	12	15	38	31	3	14	13	22	9	13	31	33	30	31	41	30	38	12	38	21	22	25	32	26	28	3417
25	Ward Burton	1	13	21	7	31	25	43	14	15	18	**30***	42	37	33	42	40	9	41	1	14	30	20	29	37	6	8	38	43	43	10	33	5*	16	40	19	12	3362
26	Jeremy Mayfield	39	29	2	23	16	14	18	11	36	38	5	39	35	36	36	28	13	34	19	38	39	15	16	25	20	10	24	20	9	20	28	28	27	21	25	33	3309
27	Jimmy Spencer	DNQ	20	10	26	37	2	8	21	17	27	10	25	23	21	28	36	4	32	11	32	31	DNQ	34	8	18	42	15	35	24	21	32	24	30	31	23	42	3187
28	John Andretti	37	15	36	36	22	34	22	42	38	24	20	15	32	31	23	10	24	22	25	23	26	11	20	19	42	29	22	29	14	18	23	13	43	18	14	39	3161
29	Johnny Benson	10	23	32	27	33	39	13	19	39	15				20	6	16	43			30	37	25	8	12	34	35	4	10	23	40	18	2	23	1	16	13	3132
30	Ken Schrader	26	35	26	24	35	22	34	36	24	43	15	18	36	16	25	38	25	40	24	20	14	28	14	14	26	26	13	22	28	41	31	26	42	22	37	27	2954
31	Mike Skinner	23	36	34	28	20	23	12	25	23	31	28	24	22	37	30	12	37	23	38	29	36	40	28	29	38	22	43	19	32	28	24	33	26	6	24	36	2886
32	Bobby Hamilton	32	9	43	29	13	28	31	27	22	30	17	23	9	27	37	31	16	15	26	19	23	19	23	11	23						27	25	35	38	29	10	2832
33	Steve Park					39	24	20	24	34	22	34	38	39	23	32	23	34	27	32	43	7	39	41	26	36	11	29	26	30	6	15	16	15	24	21	17	2694
34	Joe Nemechek	40	33	19	25	17	43				25	12	30	43	41	29	18	36	33	41	24	20	38	35	27	21	25	32	23	4	39	40	41	2	28	33	2*	2682
35	Casey Atwood	35	39	41	32	26	18	35	38	26	28	22	17	14	11	39	21	20	28	36	28	38	27	42	18	28	24	34	32	42	34	30	21	38	29		37	2621
36	Brett Bodine	16	30	35	38	38	36	38	26	13	23	19	27	34	24	34	24	38	30	27	33	42	32	38	32	39	20	36	DNQ	DNQ	29	26	38	34	36	DNQ	DNQ	2276
37	Jerry Nadeau	28	25	15	30	18	8	32	39	32	26	41	28	27			34		37	18	36	24	26	32	21	41	27	28	42	27	24	13						2250
38	Todd Bodine	31	32	**29**										18	18		26	7	26	6		34	8	26	43	33	5	42	40	34	23	37	30	41	42	22	QL	1987
39	Kenny Wallace	30	10	27	22				32	21								42	29			32	36			25	14	18	27	16	33	25		36	13	11	23	1868
40	Hut Stricklin	DNQ	27	24	43	32	35	27	15	11	40	16	22	26	22	17	33	26	36	31	31	17		36	38													1781
41	Mike Wallace	21	38							42								41	38		39	43		40	10	32	12	31	28	19	35	17	27	31	43	28	11	1551
42	Stacy Compton	27	43	39	31	27	38	19	18	27	41	26	37	24	28	35	DNQ	18	35	30				30							22	42						1527
43	Geoff Bodine	3								12						19		10		43	34	40					38				DNQ		39	DNQ			32	803
44	Steve Grissom									25	33	8	32	25	26	40			31	28													40					769
45	Hermie Sadler	DNQ					32		29		DNQ	18	Wth	DNQ	29										DNQ		23	37				41	35		41		DNQ	688
46	Jamie McMurray																														26	1*		7	15	40	22	679
47	Rick Mast	DNQ	34	40	33	24	33	29	37	DNQ	32	35																										576
48	Greg Biffle	DNQ									13													DNQ			33	27	33	36				DNQ	25		25	570
49	Buckshot Jones	DNQ	41	23	12	19	40	26	33																									DNQ				559
50	Ted Musgrave																					21				27							29	28		DNQ	16	452
51	Tony Raines													31					DNQ			DNQ		43		35			31	41				29	DNQ	43	DNQ	382
52	Shawna Robinson **(R)**	24		42	34	42		36		DNQ	42							40																				361
53	Derrike Cope			DNQ									DNQ	DNQ		38					35	DNQ		37	41									37		38	34	361
54	Frank Kimmel							33	40	35		42	26		43																			DNQ				292
55	Morgan Shepherd														Wth				40	42					DNQ	43		41	DNQ	40	DNQ		DNQ			DNQ		202
56	Scott Wimmer																		DNQ			DNQ			40				DNQ		17	DNQ		DNQ		42		192
57	Jack Sprague												Wth																	35		DNQ		DNQ	35	DNQ	30	189
58	Ron Hornaday Jr.				DNQ			DNQ					36						DNQ			DNQ									32	DNQ		DNQ	DNQ	36	Wth	177
59	Boris Said																41						13														DNQ	164
60	P. J. Jones																					DNQ	4															160
61	Scott Pruett																						6															150
62	Kevin Lepage												43															40	36									132
63	Jason Leffler																																			31	35	128
64	Mike Bliss																																14					121
65	Tim Sauter																								DNQ		37		34						DNQ			113
66	Dick Trickle		DNQ		42		42			DNQ				42																								111
67	Robert Pressley	22																													DNQ							97
68	Tom Hubert																						24															91
69	Ron Fellows																25																					88
70	Jay Sauter							37																							43							86
71	Stuart Kirby																		43			DNQ								37								86
72	Hideo Fukuyama																												39				43		DNQ			80
73	Kirk Shelmerdine	DNQ											Wth						DNQ	42	41									DNQ		DNQ	DNQ		Wth			77
74	Lance Hooper																								31											Wth		70
75	Andy Hillenburg					43			43																													68
76	Jim Inglebright																32																					67
77	Chad Little										DNQ		DNQ	33																								64
78	Hank Parker Jr.																																		33			64
79	Carl Long **(R)**	DNQ	DNQ		DNQ								DNQ	Wth	42						DNQ				DNQ	DNQ	DNQ	DNQ		DNQ		DNQ	DNQ	39	DNQ		DNQ	46
80	Jason Small															41																						40
81	Christian Fittipaldi																																			41		40
82	Dave Marcis	42																																				37
83	Austin Cameron																42						DNQ															37
84	Joe Varde																						42															37
85	Randy Renfrow		DNQ						DNQ			43	DNQ	DNQ																								34
86	Gary Bradberry															43																						34
87	Jason Hedlesky																															43						34
88	Norm Benning	DNQ																																				
89	Dwayne Leik	DNQ																																				
90	Bobby Gerhart	DNQ								DNQ																												
91	Brendan Gaughan										DNQ																											
92	Kevin Grubb											DNQ																										
93	Brandon Ash																DNQ																					
94	Ed Berrier																	DNQ																				
95	Jim Sauter																					DNQ																
96	Shane Lewis																						DNQ															
97	Justin Bell																						DNQ															
98	Kerry Earnhardt																														DNQ	DNQ		DNQ				
99	Brian Rose																																DNQ					
100	Ryan McGlynn																																DNQ					
101	Jerry Robertson																																			DNQ		
102	Jeff Jefferson																																			DNQ		
103	David Green																																				DNQ	
104	Mike Harmon																																			Wth	DNQ	
105	Dennis Setzer																			QL																		
Pos	Driver	DAY	CAR	LVS	ATL	DAR	BRI	TEX	MAR	TAL	CAL	RCH	CLT	DOV	POC	MCH	SON	DAY	CHI	NHA	POC	IND	GLN	MCH	BRI	DAR	RCH	NHA	DOV	KAN	TAL	CLT	MAR	ATL	CAR	PHO	HOM	Points

== Rookie of the Year ==
Because he had more wins, a teammate/mentor in Jeff Gordon, and the higher position in points, Jimmie Johnson was the favorite to win Rookie of the Year. But in the end, his rival Ryan Newman was named the victor. Newman's one win seemed mild to Johnson's record-tying three victories and even leading the championship standings at one point, but Newman broke the record for pole positions. The rookie points system is separate from the championship system, and only a driver's 15 best finishes counted towards the award. Newman's 15 best finishes were better than Johnson's, despite Johnson having the better run in championship points. Shawna Robinson and Carl Long, the only other racers who declared for the award, did not run enough races to remain eligible.

== See also ==
- 2002 NASCAR Busch Series
- 2002 NASCAR Craftsman Truck Series
- 2002 ARCA Re/Max Series
- 2002 NASCAR Goody's Dash Series
