= 2002 Samsung/RadioShack 500 =

Seventh race of the 2002 NASCAR Winston Cup Series

Race details
- Race 7 of 36 in the 2002 NASCAR Winston Cup Series
- The 2002 Samsung/RadioShack 500 program cover, with artwork from Sam Bass.
- Date: April 8, 2002
- Official name: 6th Annual Samsung/RadioShack 500
- Location: Fort Worth, Texas, Texas Motor Speedway
- Course: Permanent racing facility
- Course length: 1.5 miles (2.41 km)
- Distance: 334 laps, 501 mi (806.281 km)
- Scheduled distance: 334 laps, 501 mi (806.281 km)
- Average speed: 142.453 miles per hour (229.256 km/h)

Pole position
Driver	Bill Elliott	Evernham Motorsports
- Time: 27.802

Most laps led
Driver	Dale Jarrett	Robert Yates Racing
- Laps: 134

Winner
No. 17	Matt Kenseth	Roush Racing

Television in the United States
- Network: FOX

Radio in the United States
- Radio: Performance Racing Network
- Booth announcers: Doug Rice, Mark Garrow
- Turn announcers: Chuck Carland

The 2002 Samsung/RadioShack 500 was the seventh stock car race of the 2002 NASCAR Winston Cup Series and the sixth iteration of the event. The race originally was scheduled to be held on Sunday, April 7, 2002, but was delayed to Monday, April 8, 2002, due to rain. The race was held in Fort Worth, Texas at Texas Motor Speedway, a 1.5 miles (2.4 km) permanent tri-oval shaped racetrack. The race took the scheduled 334 laps to complete. At race's end, Matt Kenseth, driving for Roush Racing, would come from the back to win his third career NASCAR Winston Cup Series win and his first of the season. To fill out the podium, Jeff Gordon of Hendrick Motorsports and Mark Martin of Roush Racing would finish second and third, respectively.

== Background ==
The layout of Texas Motor Speedway, the venue where the race as held.

Texas Motor Speedway is a speedway located in Fort Worth, Texas. The track measures 1.5 miles (2.4 km) around and is banked 24 degrees in the turns, and is of the oval design, where the front straightaway juts outward slightly. The track layout is similar to Charlotte Motor Speedway. The track is owned by Speedway Motorsports.

=== Entry list ===
(R) denotes rookie driver.

#	Driver	Team	Make
1	Steve Park	Dale Earnhardt, Inc.	Chevrolet
2	Rusty Wallace	Penske Racing	Ford
4	Mike Skinner	Morgan–McClure Motorsports	Chevrolet
5	Terry Labonte	Hendrick Motorsports	Chevrolet
6	Mark Martin	Roush Racing	Ford
7	Casey Atwood	Ultra-Evernham Motorsports	Dodge
8	Dale Earnhardt Jr.	Dale Earnhardt, Inc.	Chevrolet
9	Bill Elliott	Evernham Motorsports	Dodge
10	Johnny Benson Jr.	MBV Motorsports	Pontiac
11	Brett Bodine	Brett Bodine Racing	Ford
12	Ryan Newman (R)	Penske Racing	Ford
14	Stacy Compton	A. J. Foyt Enterprises	Pontiac
15	Michael Waltrip	Dale Earnhardt, Inc.	Chevrolet
17	Matt Kenseth	Roush Racing	Ford
18	Bobby Labonte	Joe Gibbs Racing	Pontiac
19	Jeremy Mayfield	Evernham Motorsports	Dodge
20	Tony Stewart	Joe Gibbs Racing	Pontiac
21	Elliott Sadler	Wood Brothers Racing	Ford
22	Ward Burton	Bill Davis Racing	Dodge
23	Hut Stricklin	Bill Davis Racing	Dodge
24	Jeff Gordon	Hendrick Motorsports	Chevrolet
25	Jerry Nadeau	Hendrick Motorsports	Chevrolet
26	Frank Kimmel	Haas-Carter Motorsports	Ford
28	Ricky Rudd	Robert Yates Racing	Ford
29	Kevin Harvick	Richard Childress Racing	Chevrolet
30	Jeff Green	Richard Childress Racing	Chevrolet
31	Robby Gordon	Richard Childress Racing	Chevrolet
32	Ricky Craven	PPI Motorsports	Ford
36	Ken Schrader	MB2 Motorsports	Pontiac
40	Sterling Marlin	Chip Ganassi Racing	Dodge
41	Jimmy Spencer	Chip Ganassi Racing	Dodge
43	John Andretti	Petty Enterprises	Dodge
44	Buckshot Jones	Petty Enterprises	Dodge
45	Kyle Petty	Petty Enterprises	Dodge
48	Jimmie Johnson (R)	Hendrick Motorsports	Chevrolet
49	Shawna Robinson (R)	BAM Racing	Dodge
55	Bobby Hamilton	Andy Petree Racing	Chevrolet
57	Ron Hornaday Jr.	Team CLR	Ford
71	Jay Sauter	Marcis Auto Racing	Chevrolet
77	Dave Blaney	Jasper Motorsports	Ford
88	Dale Jarrett	Robert Yates Racing	Ford
90	Rick Mast	Donlavey Racing	Ford
97	Kurt Busch	Roush Racing	Ford
99	Jeff Burton	Roush Racing	Ford
Official entry list

== Practice ==
Originally, three practice sessions were scheduled to be held, with one session on Friday, and two on Saturday. However, rain on Saturday would cancel both Saturday sessions.

The only practice session was held on Friday, April 5, at 11:20 AM CST. Ricky Rudd of Robert Yates Racing would set the fastest time in the session, with a lap of 27.840 and an average speed of 193.958 miles per hour (312.145 km/h).

Pos.	#	Driver	Team	Make	Time	Speed
1	28	Ricky Rudd	Robert Yates Racing	Ford	27.840	193.958
2	24	Jeff Gordon	Hendrick Motorsports	Chevrolet	27.841	193.951
3	19	Jeremy Mayfield	Evernham Motorsports	Dodge	27.906	193.507
Full practice results

== Qualifying ==
Qualifying was held on Friday, April 5, at 3:05 PM CST. Each driver would have two laps to set a fastest time; the fastest of the two would count as their official qualifying lap. Positions 1-36 would be decided on time, while positions 37-43 would be based on provisionals. Six spots are awarded by the use of provisionals based on owner's points. The seventh is awarded to a past champion who has not otherwise qualified for the race. If no past champ needs the provisional, the next team in the owner points will be awarded a provisional.

Bill Elliott of Evernham Motorsports would win the pole, setting a time of 27.802 and an average speed of 194.223 miles per hour (312.572 km/h).

Ron Hornaday Jr. was the only driver to fail to qualify.

=== Full qualifying results ===
Pos.	#	Driver	Team	Make	Time	Speed
1	9	Bill Elliott	Evernham Motorsports	Dodge	27.802	194.223
2	21	Elliott Sadler	Wood Brothers Racing	Ford	27.968	193.070
3	28	Ricky Rudd	Robert Yates Racing	Ford	27.976	193.016
4	15	Michael Waltrip	Dale Earnhardt, Inc.	Chevrolet	27.976	193.016
5	88	Dale Jarrett	Robert Yates Racing	Ford	27.983	192.966
6	14	Stacy Compton	A. J. Foyt Enterprises	Pontiac	27.983	192.966
7	19	Jeremy Mayfield	Evernham Motorsports	Dodge	28.018	192.725
8	6	Mark Martin	Roush Racing	Ford	28.028	192.658
9	8	Dale Earnhardt Jr.	Dale Earnhardt, Inc.	Chevrolet	28.054	192.485
10	32	Ricky Craven	PPI Motorsports	Ford	28.061	192.438
11	1	Steve Park	Dale Earnhardt, Inc.	Chevrolet	28.075	192.341
12	36	Ken Schrader	MB2 Motorsports	Pontiac	28.077	192.320
13	48	Jimmie Johnson (R)	Hendrick Motorsports	Chevrolet	28.111	192.089
14	45	Kyle Petty	Petty Enterprises	Dodge	28.139	191.897
15	18	Bobby Labonte	Joe Gibbs Racing	Pontiac	28.152	191.815
16	49	Shawna Robinson (R)	BAM Racing	Dodge	28.159	191.768
17	30	Jeff Green	Richard Childress Racing	Chevrolet	28.166	191.720
18	43	John Andretti	Petty Enterprises	Dodge	28.173	191.666
19	97	Kurt Busch	Roush Racing	Ford	28.176	191.651
20	40	Sterling Marlin	Chip Ganassi Racing	Dodge	28.180	191.617
21	41	Jimmy Spencer	Chip Ganassi Racing	Dodge	28.180	191.617
22	22	Ward Burton	Bill Davis Racing	Dodge	28.190	191.557
23	7	Casey Atwood	Ultra-Evernham Motorsports	Dodge	28.193	191.537
24	31	Robby Gordon	Richard Childress Racing	Chevrolet	28.218	191.360
25	29	Kevin Harvick	Richard Childress Racing	Chevrolet	28.222	191.339
26	24	Jeff Gordon	Hendrick Motorsports	Chevrolet	28.228	191.298
27	5	Terry Labonte	Hendrick Motorsports	Chevrolet	28.231	191.279
28	2	Rusty Wallace	Penske Racing	Ford	28.290	190.880
29	20	Tony Stewart	Joe Gibbs Racing	Pontiac	28.298	190.819
30	23	Hut Stricklin	Bill Davis Racing	Dodge	28.308	190.759
31	17	Matt Kenseth	Roush Racing	Ford	28.326	190.630
32	26	Frank Kimmel	Haas-Carter Motorsports	Ford	28.343	190.516
33	10	Johnny Benson Jr.	MBV Motorsports	Pontiac	28.354	190.442
34	90	Rick Mast	Donlavey Racing	Ford	28.402	190.121
35	71	Jay Sauter	Marcis Auto Racing	Chevrolet	28.410	190.067
36	12	Ryan Newman (R)	Penske Racing	Ford	28.423	189.986
Provisionals
37	99	Jeff Burton	Roush Racing	Ford	28.613	188.725
38	25	Jerry Nadeau	Hendrick Motorsports	Chevrolet	28.478	189.647
39	77	Dave Blaney	Jasper Motorsports	Ford	28.471	189.667
40	55	Bobby Hamilton	Andy Petree Racing	Chevrolet	28.455	189.766
41	4	Mike Skinner	Morgan–McClure Motorsports	Chevrolet	28.538	189.214
42	44	Buckshot Jones	Petty Enterprises	Dodge	28.517	189.360
43	11	Brett Bodine	Brett Bodine Racing	Ford	28.679	188.291
Failed to qualify
44	57	Ron Hornaday Jr.	Team CLR	Ford	28.489	189.539
Official qualifying results

== Race results ==
Fin	St	#	Driver	Team	Make	Laps	Led	Status	Pts	Winnings
1	31	17	Matt Kenseth	Roush Racing	Ford	334	85	running	180	$418,275
2	26	24	Jeff Gordon	Hendrick Motorsports	Chevrolet	334	0	running	170	$296,478
3	8	6	Mark Martin	Roush Racing	Ford	334	5	running	170	$219,358
4	3	28	Ricky Rudd	Robert Yates Racing	Ford	334	29	running	165	$201,717
5	29	20	Tony Stewart	Joe Gibbs Racing	Pontiac	334	15	running	160	$168,053
6	13	48	Jimmie Johnson (R)	Hendrick Motorsports	Chevrolet	334	0	running	150	$105,275
7	20	40	Sterling Marlin	Chip Ganassi Racing	Dodge	334	1	running	151	$142,992
8	21	41	Jimmy Spencer	Chip Ganassi Racing	Dodge	334	0	running	142	$98,375
9	1	9	Bill Elliott	Evernham Motorsports	Dodge	334	13	running	143	$134,806
17	2	21	Elliott Sadler	Wood Brothers Racing	Ford	332	4	running	117	$102,425
10	27	5	Terry Labonte	Hendrick Motorsports	Chevrolet	334	0	running	134	$124,833
11	28	2	Rusty Wallace	Penske Racing	Ford	334	37	running	135	$130,200
12	41	4	Mike Skinner	Morgan–McClure Motorsports	Chevrolet	334	1	running	132	$106,250
13	33	10	Johnny Benson Jr.	MBV Motorsports	Pontiac	333	0	running	124	$112,900
14	10	32	Ricky Craven	PPI Motorsports	Ford	333	0	running	121	$92,050
15	39	77	Dave Blaney	Jasper Motorsports	Ford	333	0	running	118	$107,975
16	17	30	Jeff Green	Richard Childress Racing	Chevrolet	333	0	running	115	$77,725
18	7	19	Jeremy Mayfield	Evernham Motorsports	Dodge	332	0	running	109	$87,225
19	6	14	Stacy Compton	A. J. Foyt Enterprises	Pontiac	332	0	running	106	$78,000
20	11	1	Steve Park	Dale Earnhardt, Inc.	Chevrolet	332	0	running	103	$110,025
21	14	45	Kyle Petty	Petty Enterprises	Dodge	332	0	running	100	$72,700
22	18	43	John Andretti	Petty Enterprises	Dodge	332	0	running	97	$101,583
23	19	97	Kurt Busch	Roush Racing	Ford	332	1	running	99	$80,900
24	5	88	Dale Jarrett	Robert Yates Racing	Ford	331	134	running	101	$115,878
25	25	29	Kevin Harvick	Richard Childress Racing	Chevrolet	331	2	running	93	$112,528
26	42	44	Buckshot Jones	Petty Enterprises	Dodge	331	0	running	85	$75,600
27	30	23	Hut Stricklin	Bill Davis Racing	Dodge	331	4	running	87	$74,300
28	4	15	Michael Waltrip	Dale Earnhardt, Inc.	Chevrolet	331	0	running	79	$72,200
29	34	90	Rick Mast	Donlavey Racing	Ford	331	0	running	76	$62,600
30	15	18	Bobby Labonte	Joe Gibbs Racing	Pontiac	330	0	running	73	$104,628
31	40	55	Bobby Hamilton	Andy Petree Racing	Chevrolet	330	0	running	70	$75,839
32	38	25	Jerry Nadeau	Hendrick Motorsports	Chevrolet	330	0	running	67	$65,875
33	32	26	Frank Kimmel	Haas-Carter Motorsports	Ford	330	0	running	64	$79,537
34	12	36	Ken Schrader	MB2 Motorsports	Pontiac	329	0	running	61	$61,325
35	23	7	Casey Atwood	Ultra-Evernham Motorsports	Dodge	326	0	running	58	$52,300
36	16	49	Shawna Robinson (R)	BAM Racing	Dodge	322	0	running	55	$51,250
37	35	71	Jay Sauter	Marcis Auto Racing	Chevrolet	313	0	running	52	$50,200
38	43	11	Brett Bodine	Brett Bodine Racing	Ford	282	0	running	49	$49,125
39	37	99	Jeff Burton	Roush Racing	Ford	255	0	crash	46	$93,742
40	36	12	Ryan Newman (R)	Penske Racing	Ford	252	2	engine	48	$57,025
41	24	31	Robby Gordon	Richard Childress Racing	Chevrolet	236	0	crash	40	$75,036
42	9	8	Dale Earnhardt Jr.	Dale Earnhardt, Inc.	Chevrolet	192	1	crash	42	$85,722
43	22	22	Ward Burton	Bill Davis Racing	Dodge	169	0	crash	34	$92,124
Official race results

Previous race: 2002 Food City 500	NASCAR Winston Cup Series; 2002 season	Next race: 2002 Virginia 500
