= 2002 New England 300 =

19th race of the 2002 NASCAR Winston Cup Series

Race details
- Race 19 of 36 in the 2002 NASCAR Winston Cup Series
- The 2002 New England 300 program cover
- Date: July 21, 2002
- Official name: 10th Annual New England 300
- Location: Loudon, New Hampshire, New Hampshire International Speedway
- Course: Permanent racing facility
- Course length: 1.058 miles (1.703 km)
- Distance: 300 laps, 317.4 mi (510.805 km)
- Scheduled distance: 300 laps, 317.4 mi (510.805 km)
- Average speed: 92.342 miles per hour (148.610 km/h)

Pole position
Driver	Bill Elliott	Evernham Motorsports
- Time: 28.971

Most laps led
Driver	Matt Kenseth	Roush Racing
- Laps: 77

Winner
No. 22	Ward Burton	Bill Davis Racing

Television in the United States
- Network: TNT
- Announcers: Allen Bestwick, Benny Parsons, Wally Dallenbach Jr.

Radio in the United States
- Radio: Motor Racing Network

The 2002 New England 300 was the 19th stock car race of the 2002 NASCAR Winston Cup Series and the 10th iteration of the event. The race was held on Sunday, July 21, 2002, in Loudon, New Hampshire, at New Hampshire International Speedway, a 1.058-mile (1.703 km) permanent, oval-shaped, low-banked racetrack. The race took the scheduled 300 laps to complete. At race's end, Ward Burton, driving for Bill Davis Racing, took advantage of a disaster-stricken Matt Kenseth to win his fifth and final career NASCAR Winston Cup Series win and his second and final win of the season. To fill out the podium, Jeff Green of Richard Childress Racing and Dale Earnhardt Jr. of Dale Earnhardt, Inc. would finish second and third, respectively.

The race was marred by poor track conditions, as the sealer of the racetrack came apart due to a repave the speedway had which affected the corners of the track.

== Background ==
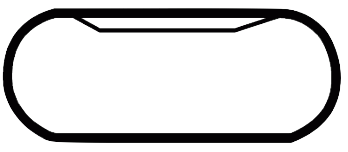
The layout of New Hampshire International Speedway, the venue where the race was held.

New Hampshire International Speedway is a 1.058-mile (1.703 km) oval speedway located in Loudon, New Hampshire which has hosted NASCAR racing annually since the early 1990s, as well as an IndyCar weekend and the oldest motorcycle race in North America, the Loudon Classic. Nicknamed "The Magic Mile", the speedway is often converted into a 1.6-mile (2.6 km) road course, which includes much of the oval. The track was originally the site of Bryar Motorsports Park before being purchased and redeveloped by Bob Bahre. The track is currently one of eight major NASCAR tracks owned and operated by Speedway Motorsports.

=== Entry list ===
- (R) denotes rookie driver.

#	Driver	Team	Make
1	Steve Park	Dale Earnhardt, Inc.	Chevrolet
2	Rusty Wallace	Penske Racing	Ford
4	Mike Skinner	Morgan–McClure Motorsports	Chevrolet
5	Terry Labonte	Hendrick Motorsports	Chevrolet
6	Mark Martin	Roush Racing	Ford
7	Casey Atwood	Ultra-Evernham Motorsports	Dodge
8	Dale Earnhardt Jr.	Dale Earnhardt, Inc.	Chevrolet
9	Bill Elliott	Evernham Motorsports	Dodge
10	Jerry Nadeau	MBV Motorsports	Pontiac
11	Brett Bodine	Brett Bodine Racing	Ford
12	Ryan Newman (R)	Penske Racing	Ford
14	Stacy Compton	A. J. Foyt Enterprises	Pontiac
15	Michael Waltrip	Dale Earnhardt, Inc.	Chevrolet
17	Matt Kenseth	Roush Racing	Ford
18	Bobby Labonte	Joe Gibbs Racing	Pontiac
19	Jeremy Mayfield	Evernham Motorsports	Dodge
20	Tony Stewart	Joe Gibbs Racing	Pontiac
21	Elliott Sadler	Wood Brothers Racing	Ford
22	Ward Burton	Bill Davis Racing	Dodge
23	Hut Stricklin	Bill Davis Racing	Dodge
24	Jeff Gordon	Hendrick Motorsports	Chevrolet
25	Joe Nemechek	Hendrick Motorsports	Chevrolet
26	Todd Bodine	Haas-Carter Motorsports	Ford
27	Kirk Shelmerdine	Kirk Shelmerdine Racing	Ford
28	Ricky Rudd	Robert Yates Racing	Ford
29	Kevin Harvick	Richard Childress Racing	Chevrolet
30	Jeff Green	Richard Childress Racing	Chevrolet
31	Robby Gordon	Richard Childress Racing	Chevrolet
32	Ricky Craven	PPI Motorsports	Ford
36	Ken Schrader	MB2 Motorsports	Pontiac
40	Sterling Marlin	Chip Ganassi Racing	Dodge
41	Jimmy Spencer	Chip Ganassi Racing	Dodge
43	John Andretti	Petty Enterprises	Dodge
44	Steve Grissom	Petty Enterprises	Dodge
45	Kyle Petty	Petty Enterprises	Dodge
48	Jimmie Johnson (R)	Hendrick Motorsports	Chevrolet
55	Bobby Hamilton	Andy Petree Racing	Chevrolet
66	Geoff Bodine	Haas-Carter Motorsports	Ford
77	Dave Blaney	Jasper Motorsports	Ford
88	Dale Jarrett	Robert Yates Racing	Ford
89	Morgan Shepherd	Shepherd Racing Ventures	Ford
97	Kurt Busch	Roush Racing	Ford
99	Jeff Burton	Roush Racing	Ford
Official entry list

== Practice ==
=== First practice ===
The first practice session was held on Friday, July 19, at 11:20 AM EST, and would last for 2 hours. John Andretti of Petty Enterprises would set the fastest time in the session, with a lap of 28.795 and an average speed of 132.273 miles per hour (212.873 km/h).

Pos.	#	Driver	Team	Make	Speed	Time
1	43	John Andretti	Petty Enterprises	Dodge	28.795	132.273
2	55	Bobby Hamilton	Andy Petree Racing	Chevrolet	28.890	131.838
3	48	Jimmie Johnson (R)	Hendrick Motorsports	Chevrolet	28.897	131.806
Full first practice results

=== Second practice ===
The second practice session was held on Saturday, July 20, at 9:30 AM EST, and would last for 45 minutes. Matt Kenseth of Roush Racing would set the fastest time in the session, with a lap of 29.560 and an average speed of 128.850 miles per hour (207.364 km/h).

Pos.	#	Driver	Team	Make	Speed	Time
1	17	Matt Kenseth	Roush Racing	Ford	29.560	128.850
2	48	Jimmie Johnson (R)	Hendrick Motorsports	Chevrolet	29.635	128.524
3	12	Ryan Newman (R)	Penske Racing	Ford	29.660	128.415
Full second practice results

=== Final practice ===
The final practice session was held on Saturday, July 20, at 11:15 AM EST, and would last for 45 minutes. Bobby Hamilton of Andy Petree Racing would set the fastest time in the session, with a lap of 29.463 and an average speed of 129.274 miles per hour (208.046 km/h).

Pos.	#	Driver	Team	Make	Speed	Time
1	55	Bobby Hamilton	Andy Petree Racing	Chevrolet	29.463	129.274
2	99	Jeff Burton	Roush Racing	Ford	29.584	128.745
3	97	Kurt Busch	Roush Racing	Ford	29.626	128.563
Full Final practice results

== Qualifying ==
Qualifying was held on Friday, July 19, at 3:00 PM EST. Each driver would have two laps to set a fastest time; the fastest of the two would count as their official qualifying lap. Positions 1-36 would be decided on time, while positions 37-43 would be based on provisionals. Six spots are awarded by the use of provisionals based on owner's points. The seventh is awarded to a past champion who has not otherwise qualified for the race. If no past champ needs the provisional, the next team in the owner points will be awarded a provisional.

Bill Elliott of Evernham Motorsports would win the pole, setting a time of 28.971 and an average speed of 131.469 miles per hour (211.579 km/h).

No drivers would fail to qualify.

=== Full qualifying results ===
Pos.	#	Driver	Team	Make	Time	Speed
1	9	Bill Elliott	Evernham Motorsports	Dodge	28.971	131.469
2	4	Mike Skinner	Morgan–McClure Motorsports	Chevrolet	29.036	131.175
3	2	Rusty Wallace	Penske Racing	Ford	29.048	131.121
4	18	Bobby Labonte	Joe Gibbs Racing	Pontiac	29.075	130.999
5	77	Dave Blaney	Jasper Motorsports	Ford	29.096	130.905
6	17	Matt Kenseth	Roush Racing	Ford	29.099	130.891
7	12	Ryan Newman (R)	Penske Racing	Ford	29.103	130.873
8	28	Ricky Rudd	Robert Yates Racing	Ford	29.110	130.842
9	32	Ricky Craven	PPI Motorsports	Ford	29.117	130.810
10	55	Bobby Hamilton	Andy Petree Racing	Chevrolet	29.122	130.788
11	24	Jeff Gordon	Hendrick Motorsports	Chevrolet	29.142	130.698
12	20	Tony Stewart	Joe Gibbs Racing	Pontiac	29.193	130.470
13	48	Jimmie Johnson (R)	Hendrick Motorsports	Chevrolet	29.195	130.461
14	19	Jeremy Mayfield	Evernham Motorsports	Dodge	29.196	130.456
15	10	Jerry Nadeau	MBV Motorsports	Pontiac	29.201	130.434
16	15	Michael Waltrip	Dale Earnhardt, Inc.	Chevrolet	29.204	130.421
17	6	Mark Martin	Roush Racing	Ford	29.227	130.318
18	40	Sterling Marlin	Chip Ganassi Racing	Dodge	29.238	130.269
19	5	Terry Labonte	Hendrick Motorsports	Chevrolet	29.240	130.260
20	36	Ken Schrader	MB2 Motorsports	Pontiac	29.240	130.260
21	99	Jeff Burton	Roush Racing	Ford	29.245	130.238
22	1	Steve Park	Dale Earnhardt, Inc.	Chevrolet	29.253	130.202
23	97	Kurt Busch	Roush Racing	Ford	29.283	130.069
24	29	Kevin Harvick	Richard Childress Racing	Chevrolet	29.306	129.967
25	44	Steve Grissom	Petty Enterprises	Dodge	29.321	129.900
26	31	Robby Gordon	Richard Childress Racing	Chevrolet	29.372	129.674
27	43	John Andretti	Petty Enterprises	Dodge	29.378	129.648
28	8	Dale Earnhardt Jr.	Dale Earnhardt, Inc.	Chevrolet	29.383	129.626
29	25	Joe Nemechek	Hendrick Motorsports	Chevrolet	29.396	129.569
30	30	Jeff Green	Richard Childress Racing	Chevrolet	29.429	129.423
31	22	Ward Burton	Bill Davis Racing	Dodge	29.438	129.384
32	26	Todd Bodine	Haas-Carter Motorsports	Ford	29.444	129.357
33	88	Dale Jarrett	Robert Yates Racing	Ford	29.453	129.318
34	41	Jimmy Spencer	Chip Ganassi Racing	Dodge	29.461	129.283
35	7	Casey Atwood	Ultra-Evernham Motorsports	Dodge	29.504	129.094
36	11	Brett Bodine	Brett Bodine Racing	Ford	29.558	128.859
Provisionals
37	45	Kyle Petty	Petty Enterprises	Dodge	29.565	128.828
38	21	Elliott Sadler	Wood Brothers Racing	Ford	29.798	127.821
39	23	Hut Stricklin	Bill Davis Racing	Dodge	30.109	126.500
40	14	Stacy Compton	A. J. Foyt Enterprises	Pontiac	29.728	128.122
41	66	Geoff Bodine	Haas-Carter Motorsports	Ford	30.787	123.715
42	27	Kirk Shelmerdine	Kirk Shelmerdine Racing	Ford	30.516	124.813
43	89	Morgan Shepherd	Shepherd Racing Ventures	Ford	30.436	125.141
Official qualifying results

== Race results ==
Fin	#	Driver	Team	Make	Laps	Led	Status	Pts	Winnings
1	22	Ward Burton	Bill Davis Racing	Dodge	300	29	running	180	$231,850
2	30	Jeff Green	Richard Childress Racing	Chevrolet	300	0	running	170	$113,750
3	88	Dale Jarrett	Robert Yates Racing	Ford	300	40	running	170	$127,500
4	2	Rusty Wallace	Penske Racing	Ford	300	59	running	165	$120,525
5	12	Ryan Newman (R)	Penske Racing	Ford	300	1	running	160	$90,900
6	26	Todd Bodine	Haas-Carter Motorsports	Ford	300	0	running	150	$92,737
7	31	Robby Gordon	Richard Childress Racing	Chevrolet	300	0	running	146	$84,081
8	97	Kurt Busch	Roush Racing	Ford	300	0	running	142	$64,925
9	29	Kevin Harvick	Richard Childress Racing	Chevrolet	300	0	running	138	$97,803
10	21	Elliott Sadler	Wood Brothers Racing	Ford	300	10	running	139	$77,275
11	41	Jimmy Spencer	Chip Ganassi Racing	Dodge	300	0	running	130	$70,125
12	99	Jeff Burton	Roush Racing	Ford	300	1	running	132	$94,892
13	18	Bobby Labonte	Joe Gibbs Racing	Pontiac	300	0	running	124	$95,903
14	40	Sterling Marlin	Chip Ganassi Racing	Dodge	300	0	running	121	$91,142
15	48	Jimmie Johnson (R)	Hendrick Motorsports	Chevrolet	300	0	running	118	$54,950
16	6	Mark Martin	Roush Racing	Ford	300	0	running	115	$85,233
17	28	Ricky Rudd	Robert Yates Racing	Ford	300	0	running	112	$91,392
18	10	Jerry Nadeau	MBV Motorsports	Pontiac	300	37	running	114	$76,825
19	19	Jeremy Mayfield	Evernham Motorsports	Dodge	300	0	running	106	$57,775
20	15	Michael Waltrip	Dale Earnhardt, Inc.	Chevrolet	300	0	running	103	$60,425
21	32	Ricky Craven	PPI Motorsports	Ford	300	0	running	100	$57,650
22	5	Terry Labonte	Hendrick Motorsports	Chevrolet	300	0	running	97	$77,658
23	8	Dale Earnhardt Jr.	Dale Earnhardt, Inc.	Chevrolet	300	43	running	99	$64,925
24	36	Ken Schrader	MB2 Motorsports	Pontiac	300	0	running	91	$64,714
25	43	John Andretti	Petty Enterprises	Dodge	300	0	running	88	$75,508
26	55	Bobby Hamilton	Andy Petree Racing	Chevrolet	300	0	running	85	$55,725
27	11	Brett Bodine	Brett Bodine Racing	Ford	300	1	running	87	$47,500
28	44	Steve Grissom	Petty Enterprises	Dodge	300	0	running	79	$46,825
29	24	Jeff Gordon	Hendrick Motorsports	Chevrolet	300	0	running	76	$97,028
30	14	Stacy Compton	A. J. Foyt Enterprises	Pontiac	300	0	running	73	$44,325
31	23	Hut Stricklin	Bill Davis Racing	Dodge	299	0	running	70	$43,625
32	1	Steve Park	Dale Earnhardt, Inc.	Chevrolet	299	0	running	67	$73,300
33	17	Matt Kenseth	Roush Racing	Ford	299	77	running	74	$71,225
34	9	Bill Elliott	Evernham Motorsports	Dodge	291	0	running	61	$75,556
35	77	Dave Blaney	Jasper Motorsports	Ford	285	0	running	58	$50,800
36	7	Casey Atwood	Ultra-Evernham Motorsports	Dodge	257	0	crash	55	$42,600
37	45	Kyle Petty	Petty Enterprises	Dodge	241	0	running	52	$42,450
38	4	Mike Skinner	Morgan–McClure Motorsports	Chevrolet	230	1	running	54	$44,800
39	20	Tony Stewart	Joe Gibbs Racing	Pontiac	121	1	crash	51	$89,803
40	89	Morgan Shepherd	Shepherd Racing Ventures	Ford	43	0	handling	43	$42,145
41	25	Joe Nemechek	Hendrick Motorsports	Chevrolet	28	0	crash	40	$50,050
42	27	Kirk Shelmerdine	Kirk Shelmerdine Racing	Ford	10	0	oil pressure	37	$42,000
43	66	Geoff Bodine	Haas-Carter Motorsports	Ford	0	0	rear end	0	$42,164
Official race results

Previous race: 2002 Tropicana 400	NASCAR Winston Cup Series; 2002 season	Next race: 2002 Pennsylvania 500
