= 2002 Pepsi 400 presented by Farmer Jack =

23rd race of the 2002 NASCAR Winston Cup Series

Race details
- Race 23 of 36 in the 2002 NASCAR Winston Cup Series
- The 2002 Pepsi 400 presented by Farmer Jack program cover.
- Date: August 18, 2002
- Official name: 33rd Annual Pepsi 400 presented by Farmer Jack
- Location: Cambridge Township, Michigan, Michigan International Speedway
- Course: Permanent racing facility
- Course length: 2 miles (3.2 km)
- Distance: 200 laps, 400 mi (643.737 km)
- Scheduled distance: 200 laps, 400 mi (643.737 km)
- Average speed: 140.556 miles per hour (226.203 km/h)

Pole position
Driver	Dale Earnhardt Jr.	Dale Earnhardt, Inc.
- Time: 37.961

Most laps led
Driver	Kevin Harvick	Richard Childress Racing
- Laps: 42

Winner
No. 88	Dale Jarrett	Robert Yates Racing

Television in the United States
- Network: TNT
- Announcers: Allen Bestwick, Benny Parsons, Wally Dallenbach Jr.

Radio in the United States
- Radio: Motor Racing Network

The 2002 Pepsi 400 presented by Farmer Jack was the 23rd stock car race of the 2002 NASCAR Winston Cup Series and the 33rd iteration of the event. The race was held on Sunday, August 18, 2002, in Cambridge Township, Michigan, at Michigan International Speedway, a two-mile (3.2 km) moderate-banked D-shaped speedway. The race took the scheduled 200 laps to complete. At race's end, Dale Jarrett, driving for Robert Yates Racing would make a late-race pass on Jeff Burton to win his 30th career NASCAR Winston Cup Series win and his second and final win of the season. To fill out the podium, Tony Stewart of Joe Gibbs Racing and Kevin Harvick of Richard Childress Racing would finish second and third, respectively.

== Background ==
The layout of Michigan International Speedway, the venue where the race was held.

The race was held at Michigan International Speedway, a two-mile (3.2 km) moderate-banked D-shaped speedway located in Cambridge Township, Michigan. The track is used primarily for NASCAR events. It is known as a "sister track" to Texas World Speedway as MIS's oval design was a direct basis of TWS, with moderate modifications to the banking in the corners, and was used as the basis of Auto Club Speedway. The track is owned by NASCAR. Michigan is recognized as one of motorsports' premier facilities because of its wide racing surface and high banking (by open-wheel standards; the 18-degree banking is modest by stock car standards).

=== Entry list ===
- (R) denotes rookie driver.

#	Driver	Team	Make
1	Steve Park	Dale Earnhardt, Inc.	Chevrolet
2	Rusty Wallace	Penske Racing	Ford
4	Mike Skinner	Morgan–McClure Motorsports	Chevrolet
5	Terry Labonte	Hendrick Motorsports	Chevrolet
6	Mark Martin	Roush Racing	Ford
7	Casey Atwood	Ultra-Evernham Motorsports	Dodge
8	Dale Earnhardt Jr.	Dale Earnhardt, Inc.	Chevrolet
9	Bill Elliott	Evernham Motorsports	Dodge
10	Johnny Benson Jr.	MBV Motorsports	Pontiac
11	Brett Bodine	Brett Bodine Racing	Ford
12	Ryan Newman (R)	Penske Racing	Ford
14	Mike Wallace	A. J. Foyt Enterprises	Pontiac
15	Michael Waltrip	Dale Earnhardt, Inc.	Chevrolet
16	Greg Biffle	Roush Racing	Ford
17	Matt Kenseth	Roush Racing	Ford
18	Bobby Labonte	Joe Gibbs Racing	Pontiac
19	Jeremy Mayfield	Evernham Motorsports	Dodge
20	Tony Stewart	Joe Gibbs Racing	Pontiac
21	Elliott Sadler	Wood Brothers Racing	Ford
22	Ward Burton	Bill Davis Racing	Dodge
23	Hut Stricklin	Bill Davis Racing	Dodge
24	Jeff Gordon	Hendrick Motorsports	Chevrolet
25	Joe Nemechek	Hendrick Motorsports	Chevrolet
26	Todd Bodine	Haas-Carter Motorsports	Ford
28	Ricky Rudd	Robert Yates Racing	Ford
29	Kevin Harvick	Richard Childress Racing	Chevrolet
30	Jeff Green	Richard Childress Racing	Chevrolet
31	Robby Gordon	Richard Childress Racing	Chevrolet
32	Ricky Craven	PPI Motorsports	Ford
36	Ken Schrader	MB2 Motorsports	Pontiac
40	Sterling Marlin	Chip Ganassi Racing	Dodge
41	Jimmy Spencer	Chip Ganassi Racing	Dodge
43	John Andretti	Petty Enterprises	Dodge
44	Jerry Nadeau	Petty Enterprises	Dodge
45	Kyle Petty	Petty Enterprises	Dodge
48	Jimmie Johnson (R)	Hendrick Motorsports	Chevrolet
49	Derrike Cope	BAM Racing	Dodge
55	Bobby Hamilton	Andy Petree Racing	Chevrolet
74	Tony Raines	BACE Motorsports	Chevrolet
77	Dave Blaney	Jasper Motorsports	Ford
88	Dale Jarrett	Robert Yates Racing	Ford
92	Stacy Compton	Melling Racing	Dodge
97	Kurt Busch	Roush Racing	Ford
99	Jeff Burton	Roush Racing	Ford
Official entry list

== Practice ==
=== First practice ===
The first practice session was held on Friday, August 16, at 3:00 PM EST, and would last for an hour after rain delayed the session. Ryan Newman of Penske Racing would set the fastest time in the session, with a lap of 38.637 and an average speed of 186.350 miles per hour (299.901 km/h).

Pos.	#	Driver	Team	Make	Time	Speed
1	12	Ryan Newman (R)	Penske Racing	Ford	38.637	186.350
2	18	Bobby Labonte	Joe Gibbs Racing	Pontiac	38.647	186.302
3	17	Matt Kenseth	Roush Racing	Ford	38.665	186.215
Full first practice results

=== Second practice ===
The second practice session was held on Saturday, August 17, at 10:00 AM EST, and would last for 45 minutes. Ryan Newman of Penske Racing would set the fastest time in the session, with a lap of 39.146 and an average speed of 183.927 miles per hour (296.002 km/h).

Pos.	#	Driver	Team	Make	Time	Speed
1	12	Ryan Newman (R)	Penske Racing	Ford	39.146	183.927
2	6	Mark Martin	Roush Racing	Ford	39.434	182.584
3	15	Michael Waltrip	Dale Earnhardt, Inc.	Chevrolet	39.581	181.906
Full second practice results

=== Final practice ===
The final practice session was held on Saturday, July 27, at 11:45 AM EST, and would last for 45 minutes. Tony Stewart of Joe Gibbs Racing would set the fastest time in the session, with a lap of 39.924 and an average speed of 180.343 miles per hour (290.234 km/h).

Pos.	#	Driver	Team	Make	Time	Speed
1	20	Tony Stewart	Joe Gibbs Racing	Pontiac	39.924	180.343
2	88	Dale Jarrett	Robert Yates Racing	Ford	40.085	179.618
3	2	Rusty Wallace	Penske Racing	Ford	40.131	179.412
Full Final practice results

== Qualifying ==
Qualifying was held on Friday, August 16, at 6:00 PM EST after rain delayed qualifying for nearly three hours. Each driver would have two laps to set a fastest time; the fastest of the two would count as their official qualifying lap. Positions 1-36 would be decided on time, while positions 37-43 would be based on provisionals. Six spots are awarded by the use of provisionals based on owner's points. The seventh is awarded to a past champion who has not otherwise qualified for the race. If no past champ needs the provisional, the next team in the owner points will be awarded a provisional.

Dale Earnhardt Jr. of Dale Earnhardt, Inc. would win the pole, setting a time of 37.961 and an average speed of 189.668 miles per hour (305.241 km/h).

Greg Biffle would be the only driver to fail to qualify.

=== Full qualifying results ===
Pos.	#	Driver	Team	Make	Time	Speed
1	8	Dale Earnhardt Jr.	Dale Earnhardt, Inc.	Chevrolet	37.961	189.668
2	29	Kevin Harvick	Richard Childress Racing	Chevrolet	38.067	189.140
3	15	Michael Waltrip	Dale Earnhardt, Inc.	Chevrolet	38.090	189.026
4	1	Steve Park	Dale Earnhardt, Inc.	Chevrolet	38.208	188.442
5	31	Robby Gordon	Richard Childress Racing	Chevrolet	38.216	188.403
6	9	Bill Elliott	Evernham Motorsports	Dodge	38.224	188.363
7	19	Jeremy Mayfield	Evernham Motorsports	Dodge	38.245	188.260
8	88	Dale Jarrett	Robert Yates Racing	Ford	38.264	188.166
9	12	Ryan Newman (R)	Penske Racing	Ford	38.315	187.916
10	43	John Andretti	Petty Enterprises	Dodge	38.350	187.745
11	18	Bobby Labonte	Joe Gibbs Racing	Pontiac	38.386	187.568
12	44	Jerry Nadeau	Petty Enterprises	Dodge	38.448	187.266
13	97	Kurt Busch	Roush Racing	Ford	38.459	187.212
14	4	Mike Skinner	Morgan–McClure Motorsports	Chevrolet	38.509	186.969
15	30	Jeff Green	Richard Childress Racing	Chevrolet	38.516	186.935
16	32	Ricky Craven	PPI Motorsports	Ford	38.549	186.775
17	6	Mark Martin	Roush Racing	Ford	38.552	186.761
18	11	Brett Bodine	Brett Bodine Racing	Ford	38.556	186.741
19	24	Jeff Gordon	Hendrick Motorsports	Chevrolet	38.582	186.615
20	21	Elliott Sadler	Wood Brothers Racing	Ford	38.590	186.577
21	17	Matt Kenseth	Roush Racing	Ford	38.607	186.495
22	26	Todd Bodine	Haas-Carter Motorsports	Ford	38.614	186.461
23	92	Stacy Compton	Melling Racing	Dodge	38.618	186.442
24	20	Tony Stewart	Joe Gibbs Racing	Pontiac	38.630	186.384
25	99	Jeff Burton	Roush Racing	Ford	38.684	186.124
26	40	Sterling Marlin	Chip Ganassi Racing	Dodge	38.701	186.042
27	36	Ken Schrader	MB2 Motorsports	Pontiac	38.712	185.989
28	5	Terry Labonte	Hendrick Motorsports	Chevrolet	38.769	185.715
29	48	Jimmie Johnson (R)	Hendrick Motorsports	Chevrolet	38.773	185.696
30	25	Joe Nemechek	Hendrick Motorsports	Chevrolet	38.785	185.639
31	28	Ricky Rudd	Robert Yates Racing	Ford	38.797	185.581
32	22	Ward Burton	Bill Davis Racing	Dodge	38.806	185.538
33	49	Derrike Cope	BAM Racing	Dodge	38.815	185.495
34	41	Jimmy Spencer	Chip Ganassi Racing	Dodge	38.818	185.481
35	10	Johnny Benson Jr.	MBV Motorsports	Pontiac	38.832	185.414
36	77	Dave Blaney	Jasper Motorsports	Ford	38.910	185.042
Provisionals
37	2	Rusty Wallace	Penske Racing	Ford	39.000	184.615
38	45	Kyle Petty	Petty Enterprises	Dodge	38.940	184.900
39	55	Bobby Hamilton	Andy Petree Racing	Chevrolet	39.054	184.360
40	23	Hut Stricklin	Bill Davis Racing	Dodge	39.191	183.716
41	7	Casey Atwood	Ultra-Evernham Motorsports	Dodge	39.506	182.251
42	14	Mike Wallace	A. J. Foyt Enterprises	Pontiac	39.639	181.639
43	74	Tony Raines	BACE Motorsports	Chevrolet	39.318	183.122
Failed to qualify
44	16	Greg Biffle	Roush Racing	Ford	39.127	184.016
Official qualifying results

== Race results ==
Fin	#	Driver	Team	Make	Laps	Led	Status	Pts	Winnings
1	88	Dale Jarrett	Robert Yates Racing	Ford	200	7	running	180	$179,530
2	20	Tony Stewart	Joe Gibbs Racing	Pontiac	200	0	running	170	$136,183
3	29	Kevin Harvick	Richard Childress Racing	Chevrolet	200	42	running	175	$116,938
4	99	Jeff Burton	Roush Racing	Ford	200	26	running	165	$112,812
5	6	Mark Martin	Roush Racing	Ford	200	21	running	160	$107,138
6	40	Sterling Marlin	Chip Ganassi Racing	Dodge	200	0	running	150	$95,432
7	48	Jimmie Johnson (R)	Hendrick Motorsports	Chevrolet	200	0	running	146	$56,665
8	10	Johnny Benson Jr.	MBV Motorsports	Pontiac	200	0	running	142	$85,990
9	30	Jeff Green	Richard Childress Racing	Chevrolet	200	0	running	138	$53,290
10	8	Dale Earnhardt Jr.	Dale Earnhardt, Inc.	Chevrolet	200	37	running	139	$78,740
11	17	Matt Kenseth	Roush Racing	Ford	200	17	running	135	$65,340
12	28	Ricky Rudd	Robert Yates Racing	Ford	200	2	running	132	$91,232
13	18	Bobby Labonte	Joe Gibbs Racing	Pontiac	200	0	running	124	$92,093
14	36	Ken Schrader	MB2 Motorsports	Pontiac	200	0	running	121	$73,115
15	15	Michael Waltrip	Dale Earnhardt, Inc.	Chevrolet	200	0	running	118	$60,490
16	19	Jeremy Mayfield	Evernham Motorsports	Dodge	200	0	running	115	$56,990
17	32	Ricky Craven	PPI Motorsports	Ford	200	1	running	117	$56,540
18	77	Dave Blaney	Jasper Motorsports	Ford	200	0	running	109	$69,040
19	24	Jeff Gordon	Hendrick Motorsports	Chevrolet	200	0	running	106	$96,918
20	43	John Andretti	Petty Enterprises	Dodge	200	0	running	103	$76,873
21	31	Robby Gordon	Richard Childress Racing	Chevrolet	200	0	running	100	$74,046
22	9	Bill Elliott	Evernham Motorsports	Dodge	200	6	running	102	$72,746
23	55	Bobby Hamilton	Andy Petree Racing	Chevrolet	200	0	running	94	$64,865
24	2	Rusty Wallace	Penske Racing	Ford	200	0	running	91	$87,015
25	45	Kyle Petty	Petty Enterprises	Dodge	200	0	running	88	$46,215
26	26	Todd Bodine	Haas-Carter Motorsports	Ford	200	0	running	85	$70,602
27	21	Elliott Sadler	Wood Brothers Racing	Ford	200	0	running	82	$61,514
28	4	Mike Skinner	Morgan–McClure Motorsports	Chevrolet	200	0	running	79	$44,875
29	22	Ward Burton	Bill Davis Racing	Dodge	200	0	running	76	$84,690
30	92	Stacy Compton	Melling Racing	Dodge	200	3	running	78	$41,615
31	12	Ryan Newman (R)	Penske Racing	Ford	200	15	running	75	$52,490
32	44	Jerry Nadeau	Petty Enterprises	Dodge	200	0	running	67	$44,415
33	5	Terry Labonte	Hendrick Motorsports	Chevrolet	199	0	running	64	$70,173
34	41	Jimmy Spencer	Chip Ganassi Racing	Dodge	199	0	running	61	$41,265
35	25	Joe Nemechek	Hendrick Motorsports	Chevrolet	199	0	running	58	$49,190
36	23	Hut Stricklin	Bill Davis Racing	Dodge	196	0	running	55	$41,140
37	49	Derrike Cope	BAM Racing	Dodge	184	0	crash	52	$41,090
38	11	Brett Bodine	Brett Bodine Racing	Ford	169	0	running	49	$40,980
39	97	Kurt Busch	Roush Racing	Ford	159	23	engine	51	$48,945
40	14	Mike Wallace	A. J. Foyt Enterprises	Pontiac	159	0	engine	43	$40,885
41	1	Steve Park	Dale Earnhardt, Inc.	Chevrolet	140	0	crash	40	$70,850
42	7	Casey Atwood	Ultra-Evernham Motorsports	Dodge	93	0	engine	37	$40,810
43	74	Tony Raines	BACE Motorsports	Chevrolet	69	0	overheating	34	$40,124
Official race results

Previous race: 2002 Sirius Satellite Radio at The Glen	NASCAR Winston Cup Series; 2002 season	Next race: 2002 Sharpie 500
