= 2002 Sirius Satellite Radio 400 =

15th race of the 2002 NASCAR Winston Cup Series

Race details
- Race 15 of 36 in the 2002 NASCAR Winston Cup Series
- The 2002 Sirius Satellite Radio 400 program cover, featuring Casey Atwood.
- Date: June 16, 2002
- Official name: 34th Annual Sirius Satellite Radio 400
- Location: Brooklyn, Michigan, Michigan International Speedway
- Course: Permanent racing facility
- Course length: 2 miles (3.2 km)
- Distance: 200 laps, 400 mi (643.737 km)
- Scheduled distance: 200 laps, 400 mi (643.737 km)
- Average speed: 154.822 miles per hour (249.162 km/h)

Pole position
Driver	Dale Jarrett	Robert Yates Racing
- Time: 38.081

Most laps led
Driver	Dale Jarrett	Robert Yates Racing
- Laps: 70

Winner
No. 17	Matt Kenseth	Roush Racing

Television in the United States
- Network: FOX
- Announcers: Mike Joy, Larry McReynolds, Darrell Waltrip

Radio in the United States
- Radio: Motor Racing Network

The 2002 Sirius Satellite Radio 400 was the 15th stock car race of the 2002 NASCAR Winston Cup Series and the 34th iteration of the event. The race was held on Sunday, June 16, 2002, in Brooklyn, Michigan, at Michigan International Speedway, a two-mile (3.2 km) moderate-banked D-shaped speedway. The race took the scheduled 200 laps to complete. At race's end, Matt Kenseth, driving for Roush Racing, would defend the field on old tires on the final restart with three to go to win his fourth career NASCAR Winston Cup Series win and his third of the season. To fill out the podium, Dale Jarrett of Robert Yates Racing and Ryan Newman of Penske Racing would finish second and third, respectively.

== Background ==
The layout of Michigan International Speedway, the venue where the race was held.

The race was held at Michigan International Speedway, a two-mile (3.2 km) moderate-banked D-shaped speedway located in Brooklyn, Michigan. The track is used primarily for NASCAR events. It is known as a "sister track" to Texas World Speedway as MIS's oval design was a direct basis of TWS, with moderate modifications to the banking in the corners, and was used as the basis of Auto Club Speedway. The track is owned by International Speedway Corporation. Michigan International Speedway is recognized as one of motorsports' premier facilities because of its wide racing surface and high banking (by open-wheel standards; the 18-degree banking is modest by stock car standards).

=== Entry list ===
- (R) denotes rookie driver.

#	Driver	Team	Make
1	Steve Park	Dale Earnhardt, Inc.	Chevrolet
2	Rusty Wallace	Penske Racing	Ford
4	Mike Skinner	Morgan–McClure Motorsports	Chevrolet
5	Terry Labonte	Hendrick Motorsports	Chevrolet
6	Mark Martin	Roush Racing	Ford
7	Casey Atwood	Ultra-Evernham Motorsports	Dodge
8	Dale Earnhardt Jr.	Dale Earnhardt, Inc.	Chevrolet
9	Bill Elliott	Evernham Motorsports	Dodge
10	Johnny Benson Jr.	MBV Motorsports	Pontiac
11	Brett Bodine	Brett Bodine Racing	Ford
12	Ryan Newman (R)	Penske Racing	Ford
14	Stacy Compton	A. J. Foyt Enterprises	Pontiac
15	Michael Waltrip	Dale Earnhardt, Inc.	Chevrolet
17	Matt Kenseth	Roush Racing	Ford
18	Bobby Labonte	Joe Gibbs Racing	Pontiac
19	Jeremy Mayfield	Evernham Motorsports	Dodge
20	Tony Stewart	Joe Gibbs Racing	Pontiac
21	Elliott Sadler	Wood Brothers Racing	Ford
22	Ward Burton	Bill Davis Racing	Dodge
23	Hut Stricklin	Bill Davis Racing	Dodge
24	Jeff Gordon	Hendrick Motorsports	Chevrolet
25	Joe Nemechek	Hendrick Motorsports	Chevrolet
26	Geoff Bodine	Haas-Carter Motorsports	Ford
28	Ricky Rudd	Robert Yates Racing	Ford
29	Kevin Harvick	Richard Childress Racing	Chevrolet
30	Jeff Green	Richard Childress Racing	Chevrolet
31	Robby Gordon	Richard Childress Racing	Chevrolet
32	Ricky Craven	PPI Motorsports	Ford
36	Ken Schrader	MB2 Motorsports	Pontiac
37	Derrike Cope	Quest Motor Racing	Ford
40	Sterling Marlin	Chip Ganassi Racing	Dodge
41	Jimmy Spencer	Chip Ganassi Racing	Dodge
43	John Andretti	Petty Enterprises	Dodge
44	Steve Grissom	Petty Enterprises	Dodge
45	Kyle Petty	Petty Enterprises	Dodge
48	Jimmie Johnson (R)	Hendrick Motorsports	Chevrolet
55	Bobby Hamilton	Andy Petree Racing	Chevrolet
59	Jason Small	Price Motorsports	Dodge
77	Dave Blaney	Jasper Motorsports	Ford
88	Dale Jarrett	Robert Yates Racing	Ford
89	Morgan Shepherd*	Shepherd Racing Ventures	Ford
90	Gary Bradberry	Donlavey Racing	Ford
97	Kurt Busch	Roush Racing	Ford
99	Jeff Burton	Roush Racing	Ford
Official entry list

- (R) denotes rookie driver.

*Withdrew.

== Practice ==
Originally, three practices were scheduled to be held, with a session on Friday and two on Saturday. However, early rain on Saturday would cancel the first Saturday session.

=== First practice ===
The first practice session was held on Friday, June 14, at 11:20 AM EST, and would last for 2 hours. Dale Jarrett of Robert Yates Racing would set the fastest time in the session, with a lap of 38.443 and an average speed of 187.290 miles per hour (301.414 km/h).

Pos.	#	Driver	Team	Make	Time	Speed
1	88	Dale Jarrett	Robert Yates Racing	Ford	38.443	187.290
2	12	Ryan Newman (R)	Penske Racing	Ford	38.464	187.188
3	24	Jeff Gordon	Hendrick Motorsports	Chevrolet	38.509	186.969
Full first practice results

=== Final practice ===
The final practice session was held on Saturday, June 15, at 11:15 AM EST, and would last for 45 minutes. Ryan Newman of Penske Racing would set the fastest time in the session, with a lap of 39.097 and an average speed of 184.157 miles per hour (296.372 km/h).

Pos.	#	Driver	Team	Make	Time	Speed
1	12	Ryan Newman (R)	Penske Racing	Ford	39.097	184.157
2	22	Ward Burton	Bill Davis Racing	Dodge	39.359	182.932
3	48	Jimmie Johnson (R)	Hendrick Motorsports	Chevrolet	39.383	182.820
Full Final practice results

== Qualifying ==
Qualifying was held on Friday, June 14, at 3:05 PM EST. Each driver would have two laps to set a fastest time; the fastest of the two would count as their official qualifying lap. Positions 1-36 would be decided on time, while positions 37-43 would be based on provisionals. Six spots are awarded by the use of provisionals based on owner's points. The seventh is awarded to a past champion who has not otherwise qualified for the race. If no past champ needs the provisional, the next team in the owner points will be awarded a provisional.

Dale Jarrett of Robert Yates Racing would win the pole, setting a time of 38.081 and an average speed of 189.071 miles per hour (304.280 km/h).

No drivers would fail to qualify.

=== Full qualifying results ===
Pos.	#	Driver	Team	Make	Time	Speed
1	88	Dale Jarrett	Robert Yates Racing	Ford	38.081	189.071
2	15	Michael Waltrip	Dale Earnhardt, Inc.	Chevrolet	38.137	188.793
3	8	Dale Earnhardt Jr.	Dale Earnhardt, Inc.	Chevrolet	38.147	188.743
4	9	Bill Elliott	Evernham Motorsports	Dodge	38.152	188.719
5	22	Ward Burton	Bill Davis Racing	Dodge	38.164	188.660
6	12	Ryan Newman (R)	Penske Racing	Ford	38.181	188.576
7	21	Elliott Sadler	Wood Brothers Racing	Ford	38.189	188.536
8	32	Ricky Craven	PPI Motorsports	Ford	38.242	188.275
9	6	Mark Martin	Roush Racing	Ford	38.260	188.186
10	20	Tony Stewart	Joe Gibbs Racing	Pontiac	38.361	187.691
11	43	John Andretti	Petty Enterprises	Dodge	38.378	187.607
12	97	Kurt Busch	Roush Racing	Ford	38.393	187.534
13	41	Jimmy Spencer	Chip Ganassi Racing	Dodge	38.394	187.529
14	48	Jimmie Johnson (R)	Hendrick Motorsports	Chevrolet	38.395	187.524
15	4	Mike Skinner	Morgan–McClure Motorsports	Chevrolet	38.471	187.154
16	1	Steve Park	Dale Earnhardt, Inc.	Chevrolet	38.479	187.115
17	26	Geoff Bodine	Haas-Carter Motorsports	Ford	38.479	187.115
18	18	Bobby Labonte	Joe Gibbs Racing	Pontiac	38.483	187.096
19	29	Kevin Harvick	Richard Childress Racing	Chevrolet	38.483	187.096
20	17	Matt Kenseth	Roush Racing	Ford	38.500	187.013
21	11	Brett Bodine	Brett Bodine Racing	Ford	38.534	186.848
22	23	Hut Stricklin	Bill Davis Racing	Dodge	38.550	186.770
23	77	Dave Blaney	Jasper Motorsports	Ford	38.615	186.456
24	24	Jeff Gordon	Hendrick Motorsports	Chevrolet	38.617	186.446
25	2	Rusty Wallace	Penske Racing	Ford	38.629	186.389
26	28	Ricky Rudd	Robert Yates Racing	Ford	38.655	186.263
27	45	Kyle Petty	Petty Enterprises	Dodge	38.660	186.239
28	55	Bobby Hamilton	Andy Petree Racing	Chevrolet	38.677	186.157
29	25	Joe Nemechek	Hendrick Motorsports	Chevrolet	38.703	186.032
30	10	Johnny Benson Jr.	MBV Motorsports	Pontiac	38.708	186.008
31	19	Jeremy Mayfield	Evernham Motorsports	Dodge	38.711	185.994
32	99	Jeff Burton	Roush Racing	Ford	38.712	185.989
33	14	Stacy Compton	A. J. Foyt Enterprises	Pontiac	38.742	185.845
34	30	Jeff Green	Richard Childress Racing	Chevrolet	38.751	185.802
35	31	Robby Gordon	Richard Childress Racing	Chevrolet	38.772	185.701
36	36	Ken Schrader	MB2 Motorsports	Pontiac	38.828	185.433
Provisionals
37	40	Sterling Marlin	Chip Ganassi Racing	Dodge	39.041	184.421
38	5	Terry Labonte	Hendrick Motorsports	Chevrolet	38.856	185.300
39	7	Casey Atwood	Ultra-Evernham Motorsports	Dodge	—	—
40	44	Steve Grissom	Petty Enterprises	Dodge	39.114	184.077
41	59	Jason Small	Price Motorsports	Dodge	39.870	180.587
42	37	Derrike Cope	Quest Motor Racing	Ford	39.015	184.544
43	90	Gary Bradberry	Donlavey Racing	Ford	39.799	180.909
Withdrew
WD	89	Morgan Shepherd	Shepherd Racing Ventures	Ford	—	—
Official qualifying results

== Race results ==
Fin	#	Driver	Team	Make	Laps	Led	Status	Pts	Winnings
1	17	Matt Kenseth	Roush Racing	Ford	200	26	running	180	$154,100
2	88	Dale Jarrett	Robert Yates Racing	Ford	200	70	running	180	$142,028
3	12	Ryan Newman (R)	Penske Racing	Ford	200	10	running	170	$100,575
4	15	Michael Waltrip	Dale Earnhardt, Inc.	Chevrolet	200	2	running	165	$80,500
5	24	Jeff Gordon	Hendrick Motorsports	Chevrolet	200	0	running	155	$112,028
6	10	Johnny Benson Jr.	MBV Motorsports	Pontiac	200	0	running	150	$89,115
7	2	Rusty Wallace	Penske Racing	Ford	200	0	running	146	$94,790
8	28	Ricky Rudd	Robert Yates Racing	Ford	200	0	running	142	$95,632
9	6	Mark Martin	Roush Racing	Ford	200	0	running	138	$87,198
10	97	Kurt Busch	Roush Racing	Ford	200	24	running	139	$64,915
11	9	Bill Elliott	Evernham Motorsports	Dodge	200	31	running	135	$88,271
12	45	Kyle Petty	Petty Enterprises	Dodge	200	0	running	127	$52,340
13	77	Dave Blaney	Jasper Motorsports	Ford	200	2	running	129	$73,440
14	48	Jimmie Johnson (R)	Hendrick Motorsports	Chevrolet	200	25	running	126	$49,740
15	32	Ricky Craven	PPI Motorsports	Ford	199	0	running	118	$59,940
16	20	Tony Stewart	Joe Gibbs Racing	Pontiac	199	0	running	115	$92,618
17	23	Hut Stricklin	Bill Davis Racing	Dodge	199	0	running	112	$57,340
18	30	Jeff Green	Richard Childress Racing	Chevrolet	199	0	running	109	$47,940
19	26	Geoff Bodine	Haas-Carter Motorsports	Ford	199	0	running	106	$72,727
20	99	Jeff Burton	Roush Racing	Ford	199	0	running	103	$91,757
21	40	Sterling Marlin	Chip Ganassi Racing	Dodge	199	0	running	100	$85,907
22	8	Dale Earnhardt Jr.	Dale Earnhardt, Inc.	Chevrolet	199	9	running	102	$80,677
23	43	John Andretti	Petty Enterprises	Dodge	199	0	running	94	$73,523
24	18	Bobby Labonte	Joe Gibbs Racing	Pontiac	198	0	running	91	$88,718
25	36	Ken Schrader	MB2 Motorsports	Pontiac	198	0	running	88	$67,340
26	21	Elliott Sadler	Wood Brothers Racing	Ford	198	1	running	90	$64,090
27	29	Kevin Harvick	Richard Childress Racing	Chevrolet	198	0	running	82	$88,103
28	41	Jimmy Spencer	Chip Ganassi Racing	Dodge	198	0	running	79	$45,175
29	25	Joe Nemechek	Hendrick Motorsports	Chevrolet	198	0	running	76	$52,965
30	4	Mike Skinner	Morgan–McClure Motorsports	Chevrolet	197	0	running	73	$53,279
31	5	Terry Labonte	Hendrick Motorsports	Chevrolet	197	0	running	70	$70,573
32	1	Steve Park	Dale Earnhardt, Inc.	Chevrolet	197	0	running	67	$71,540
33	31	Robby Gordon	Richard Childress Racing	Chevrolet	197	0	running	64	$67,646
34	11	Brett Bodine	Brett Bodine Racing	Ford	196	0	running	61	$41,520
35	14	Stacy Compton	A. J. Foyt Enterprises	Pontiac	196	0	running	58	$41,445
36	19	Jeremy Mayfield	Evernham Motorsports	Dodge	195	0	running	55	$49,395
37	55	Bobby Hamilton	Andy Petree Racing	Chevrolet	195	0	running	52	$49,345
38	37	Derrike Cope	Quest Motor Racing	Ford	194	0	running	49	$41,235
39	7	Casey Atwood	Ultra-Evernham Motorsports	Dodge	193	0	running	46	$41,200
40	44	Steve Grissom	Petty Enterprises	Dodge	193	0	running	43	$41,165
41	59	Jason Small	Price Motorsports	Dodge	160	0	brakes	40	$41,130
42	22	Ward Burton	Bill Davis Racing	Dodge	137	0	engine	37	$84,090
43	90	Gary Bradberry	Donlavey Racing	Ford	72	0	handling	34	$40,399
Official race results

Previous race: 2002 Pocono 500	NASCAR Winston Cup Series; 2002 season	Next race: 2002 Dodge/Save Mart 350
