= James Ince =

American NASCAR crew chief (born 1970)

Personal information
- Nationality: American
- Born: November 24, 1970 (age 55) Springfield, Missouri, U.S.
- Occupation: Crew chief
- Years active: 1991–2006

Sport
- Sport: NASCAR Nextel Cup Series

James Ince (born November 24, 1970) is an American NASCAR crew chief. He served as crew chief for various teams such as Roush Racing, Tyler Jet Motorsports, MB2 Motorsports, and MBV Motorsports.

== Career ==
Born in Springfield, Missouri, Ince was a farmer when his career started in 1991 in the Winston Racing Series with Larry Phillips, and the following two seasons, the two won 70 of 80 races, and won two consecutive championships. In 1993, Ince worked with Mark Martin in the Busch Series, helping him win seven races; Ince also worked with Martin in the Craftsman Truck Series, guiding him to a win at North Wilkesboro Speedway. In late 1996, Ince became the crew chief for Winston Cup Series driver Ted Musgrave of Roush Racing beginning at Charlotte Motor Speedway. He held the position until he was replaced by Joey Knuckles in the 1998 race at Michigan International Speedway. In 1999, Ince remained with Roush Racing when he became the crew chief for Kevin Lepage, but subsequently left the team.

In 2000, Ince became the crew chief for Johnny Benson Jr. of MB2 Motorsports, and despite being docked 108 points and $10,400 after winning a Winston West race at Fontana for unsanctioned parts in the team's Tyler Jet Motorsports car, in the Cup Series, the duo recorded 13 top-five finishes and a win at North Carolina Speedway in 2002, the first Cup victory for Ince. That same year, Ince, along with six other crew chiefs, were each fined $500 for violations at the Pepsi 400. Also in 2002, Ince served as crew chief in the Busch Series for Jerry Nadeau. In 2003, Ince was fined $1,000 for violations at Atlanta Motor Speedway, and later in the year, Ince missed the Banquet 400 for personal reasons, and eventually requested for his release from the team. In 2004, Ince joined Peak Fitness Racing with Hermie Sadler as the driver. In 2005, it was reported that Ince will serve as crew chief for PPI Motorsports driver Bobby Hamilton Jr., and Ince remained with the team the following season when Hamilton was replaced by Travis Kvapil.

Ince unofficially retired after the 2006 season, but expressed plans to return as the general manager and Director of Race Operations of a Truck Series team in 2009.
