= Tom Hubert =

American racing driver (born 1964)

Thomas Hubert
- Born: August 6, 1964 (age 62); Cottonwood, California, U.S.

NASCAR Cup Series career
- 11 races run over 8 years
- 2006 position: 74th
- Best finish: 57th (1999)
- First race: 1997 Save Mart Supermarkets 300 (Sears Point)
- Last race: 2006 Dodge/Save Mart 350 (Infineon)
| Wins | Top tens | Poles |
|---|---|---|
| 0 | 0 | 0 |

NASCAR O'Reilly Auto Parts Series career
- 14 races run over 3 years
- First race: 1999 Textilease/Medique 300 (South Boston)
- Last race: 2009 NAPA Auto Parts 200 (Montreal)
| Wins | Top tens | Poles |
|---|---|---|
| 0 | 0 | 0 |

NASCAR FedEx Freight Truck Series career
- 15 races run over 3 years
- First race: 1997 Colorado 250 By Snap-On Tools (Colorado)
- Last race: 1999 O'Reilly Auto Parts 200 (I-70)
| Wins | Top tens | Poles |
|---|---|---|
| 0 | 2 | 1 |
- Statistics up to date as of August 30, 2009.

Tom Hubert (born August 6, 1964) is an American road course racer.

Hubert was born in Cottonwood, California. He most recently worked as a rear tire changer and a mechanic for Bill Davis Racing's No. 22 Sprint Cup team, before the team closed down, and also occasionally races road courses for various teams. His hobbies include golf and water skiing.

== NASCAR career ==
=== Sprint Cup Series ===
Hubert made his first Winston Cup race in his first attempt with Jim Wilson's No. 78 team at Sears Point during the 1997 season. He would bring the No. 78 Hanes / Diamond Rio Ford home in the 28th position, one lap down. His next start would come in 1998 with the No. 19 team owned by Kurt Roehrig. He qualified an impressive tenth in his second race at Sears Point, however the No. 19 Bradford White Ford would finish 41st after a transmission failure 78 laps into the race. His second start during the 1998 season would come at Watkins Glen with Dan Marino and Bill Elliott's No. 13 team. Hubert drove the No. 13 FirstPlus Financial Ford to a 36th place finish. He would return to Roehrig's team in 1999 for three races. His first start would come at Las Vegas where he qualified fourth, finishing in the 28th position. Again, Hubert raced at Sears Point where he would finish in the 33rd position, one lap down. He also attempted the Pepsi 400 at Michigan, however he was unable to qualify.

In 2000, Hubert would make one start with Penske Racing and the No. 12 Mobil 1 Ford. He would finish the Global Crossing @ The Glen in 33rd place after starting sixteenth.

In 2001, Hubert qualified Buckshot Jones' No. 44 Georgia Pacific Dodge for the Dodge/Save Mart 350. In 2002, he would race the Sirius Satellite Radio at the Glen for Bill Davis Racing. Hubert finished the No. 23 Hills Brothers Coffee Dodge in the 24th position after starting fortieth. He would return to the series in 2004 with Kirk Shelmerdine Racing, driving each of the road courses. At the newly renamed Infineon Raceway (formerly Sears Point Raceway) he would finish 43rd in the No. 72 Freddie B's Ford after running five laps at too slow of a pace for NASCAR. The Watkins Glen would be much better for Hubert as he would finish in the 29th position just one lap down. He would return to Shelmerdine's team for 2005 and attempt each of the road courses. He would make the race at Infineon, however he finished 43rd after oil pressure problems. Hubert would not make the Sirius at The Glen after qualifying was rained out. Hubert again raced for Shelmerdine in 2006 for the Dodge/Save Mart 350, but was swept up in a crash on the opening lap and once more finished last.

=== Busch Series ===
Hubert made his first Busch Series start in 1999 with Bill Davis Racing at South Boston Speedway in the No. 93 Amoco Pontiac. He would start the race in the 28th position and finish in eighteenth place. He would attempt his second race that year with Andy Petree Racing in the No. 15 Chevy for the Dura Lube 200 at Darlington, however he was unable to break into the field. In 2000, Hubert would attempt ten races for BDR and make nine of them. His best finish in the No. 20 AT&T Pontiac would be a 21st at Myrtle Beach. He would also lead fifteen laps at Watkins Glen, but would finish that race in the 37th position, many laps down. He would return to the Busch Series in 2001 with No. 00 team owned by Buckshot Jones' family. Hubert would drive the No. 00 Georgia Pacific Pontiac to a 28th place finish at Watkins Glen. He would also make one start for Team Bristol Motorsports at Charlotte. He drove the No. 54 General Creations Toys Chevrolet until the car had overheating problems around lap 138, leaving him with a finish of 35th.

=== Craftsman Truck Series ===
Hubert has had the most success in the Craftsman Truck Series, scoring two top fives in fifteen races. He would make his first start in 1997 with Dana Racing at Colorado where he would finish 23rd. Hubert would race an additional four races in the No. 18 Dana Dodge. He dominated the 1997 Kragen / Exide 151 at Infineon Raceway only to finish second to Joe Ruttman. In 1998, he would drive five races for Phelon Motorsports in the No. 66 Carlin Burners & Controls Ford. His best finish was a fifth at Gateway and he was able to get a pole at Sears Point. Hubert would also drive one race for Engineered Victories Inc and finish 24th in the No. 89 Cyberdyne Tech Chevrolet. In 1999, he would compete in three races for Conley Racing and one race for Marty Walsh's No. 81 team. He had a wild ride during the one-hundredth race in Craftsman Truck series history at Evergreen when he spun after contact from behind by David Starr through an opening in the inside wall and went into the infield. Amazingly, he didn't hit anything, but when he brought it into the pits seconds later, his brakes failed and his truck caught fire, sending him out. His best finish during the season, seventeenth, would come in the No. 7 Conely Racing Engines Chevrolet at Phoenix. He has yet to return to the Craftsman Truck Series since the 1999 season.

== Motorsports career results ==
=== NASCAR ===
(key) (Bold – Pole position awarded by qualifying time. Italics – Pole position earned by points standings or practice time. * – Most laps led.)

==== Sprint Cup Series ====
NASCAR Sprint Cup Series results
| Year | Team | No. | Make | 1 | 2 | 3 | 4 | 5 | 6 | 7 | 8 | 9 | 10 | 11 | 12 | 13 | 14 | 15 | 16 | 17 | 18 | 19 | 20 | 21 | 22 | 23 | 24 | 25 | 26 | 27 | 28 | 29 | 30 | 31 | 32 | 33 | 34 | 35 | 36 | NSCC | Pts | Ref |
|---|---|---|---|---|---|---|---|---|---|---|---|---|---|---|---|---|---|---|---|---|---|---|---|---|---|---|---|---|---|---|---|---|---|---|---|---|---|---|---|---|---|---|
| 1997 | Triad Motorsports | 78 | Ford | DAY | CAR | RCH | ATL | DAR | TEX | BRI | MAR | SON; 28 | TAL | CLT | DOV | POC | MCH | CAL | DAY | NHA | POC | IND | GLN | MCH | BRI | DAR | RCH | NHA | DOV | MAR | CLT | TAL | CAR | PHO | ATL | | | | | 61st | 79 | |
| 1998 | Roehrig Motorsports | 19 | Ford | DAY | CAR | LVS | ATL | DAR | BRI | TEX | MAR | TAL | CAL | CLT | DOV | RCH | MCH | POC | SON; 41 | NHA | POC | IND | | | | | | | | | | | | | | | | | | 61st | 95 | |
| 1998 | Elliott-Marino Racing | 13 | Ford | | | | | | | | | | | | | | | | | | | | GLN; 36 | MCH | BRI | NHA | DAR | RCH | DOV | MAR | CLT | TAL | DAY | PHO | CAR | ATL | | | | 61st | 95 | |
| 1999 | Roehrig Motorsports | 19 | Ford | DAY | CAR | LVS; 28 | ATL | DAR | TEX | BRI | MAR | TAL | CAL | RCH | CLT | DOV | MCH | POC | | | | | | | | | | | | | | | | | | | | | | 57th | 143 | |
| 1999 | Roehrig Motorsports | 19 | Pontiac | | | | | | | | | | | | | | | | SON; 33 | DAY | NHA | POC | IND | GLN | MCH; DNQ | BRI | DAR | RCH | NHA | DOV | MAR | CLT | TAL | CAR | PHO | HOM | ATL | | | 57th | 143 | |
| 2000 | Penske-Kranefuss Racing | 12 | Ford | DAY | CAR | LVS | ATL | DAR | BRI | TEX | MAR | TAL | CAL | RCH | CLT | DOV | MCH | POC | SON | DAY | NHA | POC | IND | GLN; 33 | MCH | BRI | DAR | RCH | NHA | DOV | MAR | CLT | TAL | CAR | PHO | HOM | ATL | | | 65th | 64 | |
| 2001 | Petty Enterprises | 44 | Dodge | DAY | CAR | LVS | ATL | DAR | BRI | TEX | MAR | TAL | CAL | RCH | CLT | DOV | MCH | POC | SON; QL^{†} | DAY | CHI | NHA | POC | IND | GLN | MCH | BRI | DAR | RCH | DOV | KAN | CLT | MAR | TAL | PHO | CAR | HOM | ATL | NHA | NA | - | |
| 2002 | Bill Davis Racing | 23 | Dodge | DAY | CAR | LVS | ATL | DAR | BRI | TEX | MAR | TAL | CAL | RCH | CLT | DOV | POC | MCH | SON | DAY | CHI | NHA | POC | IND | GLN; 24 | MCH | BRI | DAR | RCH | NHA | DOV | KAN | TAL | CLT | MAR | ATL | CAR | PHO | HOM | 68th | 91 | |
| 2004 | Kirk Shelmerdine Racing | 72 | Ford | DAY | CAR | LVS | ATL | DAR | BRI | TEX | MAR | TAL | CAL | RCH | CLT | DOV | POC | MCH | SON; 43 | DAY | CHI | NHA | POC | IND | GLN; 29 | MCH | BRI | CAL | RCH | NHA | DOV | TAL | KAN | CLT | MAR | ATL | PHO | DAR | HOM | 73rd | 110 | |
| 2005 | Kirk Shelmerdine Racing | 27 | Ford | DAY | CAL | LVS | ATL | BRI | MAR | TEX | PHO | TAL | DAR | RCH | CLT | DOV | POC | MCH | SON; 43 | DAY | CHI | NHA | POC | IND | GLN; DNQ | MCH | BRI | CAL | RCH | NHA | DOV | TAL | KAN | CLT | MAR | ATL | TEX | PHO | HOM | 86th | 34 | |
| 2006 | Kirk Shelmerdine Racing | 27 | Ford | DAY | CAL | LVS | ATL | BRI | MAR | TEX | PHO | TAL | RCH | DAR | CLT | DOV | POC | MCH | SON; 43 | DAY | CHI | NHA | POC | IND | GLN; DNQ | MCH | BRI | CAL | RCH | NHA | DOV | KAN | TAL | CLT | MAR | ATL | TEX | PHO | HOM | 74th | 34 | |
| 2009 | Kirk Shelmerdine Racing | 27 | Toyota | DAY | CAL | LVS | ATL | BRI | MAR | TEX | PHO | TAL | RCH | DAR | CLT | DOV | POC | MCH | SON; DNQ | NHA | DAY | CHI | IND | POC | GLN | MCH | BRI | ATL | RCH | NHA | DOV | KAN | CAL | CLT | MAR | TAL | TEX | PHO | HOM | NA | - | |
^{†} – Qualified for Buckshot Jones

==== Nationwide Series ====
NASCAR Nationwide Series results
| Year | Team | No. | Make | 1 | 2 | 3 | 4 | 5 | 6 | 7 | 8 | 9 | 10 | 11 | 12 | 13 | 14 | 15 | 16 | 17 | 18 | 19 | 20 | 21 | 22 | 23 | 24 | 25 | 26 | 27 | 28 | 29 | 30 | 31 | 32 | 33 | 34 | 35 | NNSC | Pts | Ref |
|---|---|---|---|---|---|---|---|---|---|---|---|---|---|---|---|---|---|---|---|---|---|---|---|---|---|---|---|---|---|---|---|---|---|---|---|---|---|---|---|---|---|
| 1999 | Bill Davis Racing | 93 | Pontiac | DAY | CAR | LVS | ATL | DAR | TEX | NSV | BRI | TAL | CAL | NHA | RCH | NZH | CLT | DOV | SBO; 18 | GLN | MLW | MYB | PPR | GTY | IRP | MCH | BRI | | | | | | | | | | | | 106th | 109 | |
| 1999 | Andy Petree Racing | 15 | Chevy | | | | | | | | | | | | | | | | | | | | | | | | | DAR; DNQ | RCH | DOV | CLT | CAR | MEM | PHO | HOM | | | | 106th | 109 | |
| 2000 | Bill Davis Racing | 20 | Pontiac | DAY | CAR | LVS | ATL | DAR | BRI | TEX | NSV | TAL | CAL | RCH | NHA | CLT | DOV | SBO; 29 | MYB; 21 | GLN; 37 | MLW; 24 | NZH; 36 | PPR; 34 | GTY; 34 | IRP; 38 | MCH; 29 | BRI; DNQ | DAR | RCH | DOV | CLT | CAR | MEM | PHO | HOM | | | | 58th | 626 | |
| 2001 | Buckshot Racing | 00 | Pontiac | DAY | CAR | LVS | ATL | DAR | BRI | TEX | NSH | TAL | CAL | RCH | NHA | NZH | CLT | DOV | KEN | MLW | GLN; 28 | CHI | GTY | PPR | IRP | MCH | BRI | DAR | RCH | DOV | KAN | | | | | | | | 114th | 79 | |
| 2001 | Team Bristol Motorsports | 54 | Chevy | | | | | | | | | | | | | | | | | | | | | | | | | | | | | CLT; 35 | MEM | PHO | CAR | HOM | | | 114th | 79 | |
| 2009 | Rick Ware Racing | 41 | Chevy | DAY | CAL | LVS | BRI | TEX | NSH | PHO | TAL | RCH | DAR | CLT | DOV | NSH | KEN | MLW | NHA | DAY | CHI | GTY | IRP | IOW | GLN; 41 | MCH | BRI | | | | | | | | | | | | 137th | 74 | |
| 2009 | MSRP Motorsports | 91 | Chevy | | | | | | | | | | | | | | | | | | | | | | | | | CGV; 43 | ATL | RCH | DOV | KAN | CAL | CLT | MEM | TEX | PHO | HOM | 137th | 74 | |

==== Craftsman Truck Series ====
NASCAR Craftsman Truck Series results
| Year | Team | No. | Make | 1 | 2 | 3 | 4 | 5 | 6 | 7 | 8 | 9 | 10 | 11 | 12 | 13 | 14 | 15 | 16 | 17 | 18 | 19 | 20 | 21 | 22 | 23 | 24 | 25 | 26 | 27 | NCTC | Pts | Ref |
|---|---|---|---|---|---|---|---|---|---|---|---|---|---|---|---|---|---|---|---|---|---|---|---|---|---|---|---|---|---|---|---|---|---|
| 1997 | Roehrig Motorsports | 18 | Dodge | WDW | TUS | HOM | PHO | POR | EVG | I70 | NHA | TEX | BRI | NZH | MLW | LVL | CNS; 23 | HPT; 31 | IRP | FLM | NSV; 28 | GLN | RCH | MAR | SON; 2 | MMR | CAL | PHO; 11 | LVS | | 43rd | 543 | |
| 1998 | | 77 | | WDW | HOM | PHO | POR | EVG | I70 | GLN | TEX | BRI | MLW | NZH | CAL | PPR | IRP | NHA | FLM | NSV; DNQ | | | | | | | | | | | 40th | 653 | |
| 1998 | Phelon Motorsports | 66 | Ford | | | | | | | | | | | | | | | | | | HPT; 18* | LVL; 21 | RCH | MEM | GTY; 5 | MAR; 34 | **SON**; 27 | MMR | PHO | | 40th | 653 | |
| 1998 | EVI Motorsports | 89 | Chevy | | | | | | | | | | | | | | | | | | | | | | | | | | | LVS; 24 | 40th | 653 | |
| 1999 | Conely Racing | 7 | Chevy | HOM; 18 | PHO; 17 | EVG; 27 | MMR | MAR | MEM | PPR | | | | | | | | | | | | | | | | | | | | | 46th | 373 | |
| 1999 | Raptor Performance Motorsports | 81 | Ford | | | | | | | | I70; 31 | BRI | TEX | PIR | GLN | MLW | NSV | NZH | MCH | NHA | IRP | GTY | HPT | RCH | LVS | LVL | TEX | CAL | | | 46th | 373 | |
