= Kevin Grubb =

American racing driver

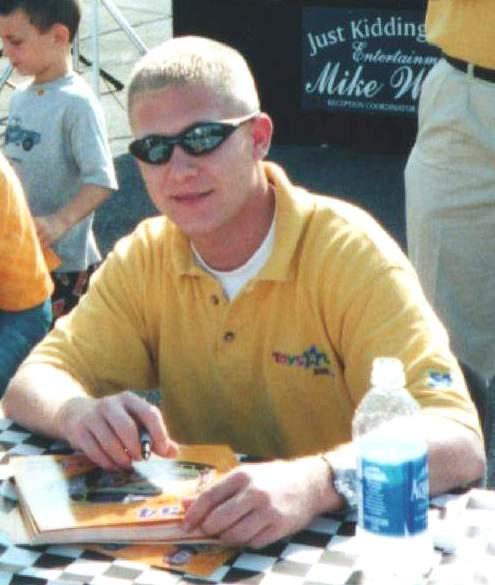
- Grubb at an autograph signing in 2002
- Born: April 19, 1978; Mechanicsville, Virginia, U.S.
- Died: May 6, 2009 (aged 31); Richmond, Virginia, U.S.
- Cause of death: Suicide

NASCAR O'Reilly Auto Parts Series career
- 174 races run over 8 years
- Best finish: 13th (2000)
- First race: 1997 United States Cellular 200 (Loudon)
- Last race: 2006 Emerson Radio 250 (Richmond)
Wins	Top tens	Poles
0	32	1

NASCAR FedEx Freight Truck Series career
- 8 races run over 3 years
- Best finish: 45th (2006)
- First race: 1996 Fas Mart Supertruck Shootout (Richmond)
- Last race: 2006 Toyota Tundra 200 (Nashville)
Wins	Top tens	Poles
0	0	0

Kevin Grubb (April 19, 1978 – May 6, 2009) was an American race car driver from Mechanicsville, Virginia. He was the younger brother of former race car driver Wayne Grubb. He was under suspension from NASCAR competition due to two violations in NASCAR's substance abuse policy at the time of his death.

== NASCAR Cup Series ==
Grubb's only attempt in the Cup Series came in 2002 when he attempted the Pontiac Excitement 400 at Richmond. He drove the No. 54 Toys "R" Us Chevy for Team Bristol Motorsports, but was unable to get into the race. During his qualifying attempt he spun out on his second lap and without any owner points was the only car not to make the race. The team was supposed to attempt the 2003 season full-time, with Grubb running for rookie of the year, but the plans fell through.

== Busch Series ==
Grubb's stint in NASCAR's junior series began in 1997, with four starts with his father's team Grubb Motorsports. His first start came in the No. 82 Virginia is for Lovers Chevy where he finished 38th at New Hampshire. His first three starts ended in accidents. In his final start of the year, he finished his fourth start in the 21st position at Dover. In 1998, he ran sixteen Busch Series races for Grubb Motorsports. He ran well in many of those races with a top finish of second at Dover after getting his first pole. His teammate was his brother Wayne Grubb who also raced for his father's team. After a successful year, Grubb was offered a ride at Brewco Motorsports in 1999. Grubb raced for Brewco through 2001. He would amass eighteen top-tens in those three years, with his best points finish of 13th in the 2000 season. Early in the 2002 season, he was tabbed to race for Team Bristol Motorsports, replacing Kelly Denton. The team was plagued by failures, and Grubb was released by the end of the season. In 2003, he signed a partial season deal with Carroll Motorsports. He ran well, but had a series of engine problems and got caught in accidents not of his making. Carroll Motorsports folded at the conclusion of the 2003 season. While heading into the 2004 season, he was scheduled to compete in a handful of races for Team Rensi Motorsports, but failed a substance abuse test in March 2004 (below).

Following reinstatement in June 2006, Grubb appeared on an entry list for a Busch Series race at Nashville Speedway as the driver of the No. 56 Mac Hill Motorsports Chevy. There was some initial doubt as to whether or not he was officially reinstated; however, multiple reports stated that a NASCAR official confirmed that he was reinstated. He drove the car in non-companion events the team entered; however, Kevin Lepage was still the driver most race weekends. He participated in five Busch events before being suspended indefinitely on September 11, 2006.

== Camping World Truck Series ==
Grubb began his career in the NASCAR Truck Series running for the family owned Grubb Motorsports. In 1996, he had two starts in the No. 55 Virginia is for Lovers Chevy finishing his first start on the lead lap in eighteenth after starting the race in the eighth position. In his second start, an accident brought his race to an end after just 48 laps. He returned to the series in 1997 for one more start where he finished thirteenth in an unsponsored Grubb Motorsports Chevy at Nazareth.

In August 2006, Grubb took over the No. 15 truck for Billy Ballew Motorsports after Kyle Krisiloff left due to a dispute with Kyle's dad over sponsorship. However, that effort ended with the drug suspension in September 2006.

== Substance abuse test ==
NASCAR's Substance Abuse Policy allows NASCAR to administer drug tests virtually any time, anywhere, based only on "reasonable suspicion."

Grubb failed a substance abuse test in March 2004, and was inactive until June 2006 when he was reinstated by NASCAR. One of the conditions of his reinstatement was random, unannounced drug tests, a condition to which he agreed. He participated in five Busch events before being suspended indefinitely on September 11, 2006, when he refused to take a drug test following a second-lap crash at Richmond. Failure to take the test resulted in automatic suspension.

The next day, Grubb claimed that his failure to take the test was a result of confusion following a concussion suffered during the race, and offered to take a drug test at that time. He was cleared by the infield hospital following the crash, but was diagnosed with a concussion the next day at a local hospital. He claimed no memory of the refusal to submit to a drug test.

In a comparable situation, NASCAR driver Shane Hmiel was offered a chance at reinstatement after a second such infraction, under condition that he submit to medical and psychological reviews, and frequent drug testing before reinstatement. In February 2007, Hmiel failed a drug test, and was banned for life.

== Death ==
Grubb was found dead at Alpine Motel on May 6, 2009, at 11:30 a.m. according to Henrico County authorities. The Richmond Times-Dispatch reported the cause of death was a self-inflicted gunshot wound to the head.

The police reported no indications of any illegal substances inside the hotel room.

== Motorsports career results ==
=== NASCAR ===
(key) (Bold – Pole position awarded by qualifying time. Italics – Pole position earned by points standings or practice time. * – Most laps led.)

==== Winston Cup Series ====
NASCAR Winston Cup Series results
Year	Team	No.	Make	1	2	3	4	5	6	7	8	9	10	11	12	13	14	15	16	17	18	19	20	21	22	23	24	25	26	27	28	29	30	31	32	33	34	35	36	NWCC	Pts	Ref
2002	Team Bristol Motorsports	54	Chevy	DAY	CAR	LVS	ATL	DAR	BRI	TEX	MAR	TAL	CAL	RCH; DNQ	CLT	DOV	POC	MCH	SON	DAY	CHI	NHA	POC	IND	GLN	MCH	BRI	DAR	RCH	NHA	DOV	KAN	TAL	CLT	MAR	ATL	CAR	PHO	HOM	NA	-	

==== Busch Series ====
NASCAR Busch Series results
Year	Team	No.	Make	1	2	3	4	5	6	7	8	9	10	11	12	13	14	15	16	17	18	19	20	21	22	23	24	25	26	27	28	29	30	31	32	33	34	35	NBSC	Pts	Ref
1997	Grubb Motorsports	82	Chevy	DAY	CAR	RCH; DNQ	ATL	LVS	DAR	HCY; DNQ	TEX	BRI	NSV	TAL	NHA; 38	NZH	CLT	DOV	SBO; 32	GLN	MLW	MYB	GTY	IRP; 36	MCH	BRI	DAR	RCH; DNQ	DOV; 21	CLT	CAL	CAR	HOM						79th	171	
1998	Grubb Motorsports	52	Chevy	DAY	CAR; 22	LVS	NSV	DAR; 15	BRI; 24	TEX	HCY; 26	TAL	NHA; 8			DOV; 20	RCH; 9	PPR; 30	GLN	MLW	MYB; 32	CAL	SBO; 27	IRP	MCH	BRI; 25	DAR; 32	RCH; 38	**DOV**; 2			CAR; 4	ATL; 6	HOM					35th	1660	
1998	Akins-Sutton Motorsports	8	Ford											NZH; 43	CLT																								35th	1660	
1998	Curb Agajanian Performance Group	43	Chevy																											CLT; DNQ	GTY; 40								35th	1660	
1999	Brewco Motorsports	37	Chevy	DAY; 8	CAR; 16	LVS; DNQ	ATL; DNQ	DAR; DNQ	TEX; 25	NSV; 27	BRI; 7	TAL; 30	CAL; 40	NHA; 17	RCH; 27	NZH; 18	CLT; 42	DOV; 6	SBO; 14	GLN; 31	MLW; 29	MYB; DNQ	PPR; 17	GTY; 36	IRP; 28	MCH; 20	BRI; 37	DAR; 20	RCH; 5	DOV; 39	CLT; 39	CAR; 38	MEM; 8	PHO; 21	HOM; DNQ				17th	2607	
1999	Grubb Motorsports	83	Chevy					DAR; 18																															17th	2607	
2000	Brewco Motorsports	37	Chevy	DAY; DNQ	CAR; 7	LVS; 12	ATL; 5	DAR; 12	BRI; 11	TEX; 14	NSV; 14	TAL; 15	CAL; 17	RCH; 37	NHA; 38	CLT; 28	DOV; 36	SBO; 37	MYB; 8	GLN; 24	MLW; 12	NZH; 9	PPR; 16	GTY; 31	IRP; 30	MCH; 34	BRI; 43	DAR; 25	RCH; 5	DOV; 7	CLT; 18	CAR; 41	MEM; 13	PHO; 17	HOM; 41				13th	3124	
2001	Brewco Motorsports	37	Pontiac	DAY; 39								TAL; 8																											14th	3533	
2001	Brewco Motorsports	37	Chevy		CAR; 12	LVS; 19	ATL; 25	DAR; 21	BRI; 35	TEX; 18	NSH; 34		CAL; 26	RCH; 15	NHA; 20	NZH; 18	CLT; 33	DOV; 33	KEN; 8	MLW; 3	GLN; 13	CHI; 9	GTY; 3	PPR; 8	IRP; 22	MCH; 13	BRI; 13	DAR; 32	RCH; 3	DOV; 20	KAN; 22	CLT; 20	MEM; 28	PHO; 23	CAR; 15	HOM; 29			14th	3533	
2002	Team Bristol Motorsports	54	Chevy	DAY	CAR	LVS; 41	DAR; 32	BRI; 12	TEX; 24	NSH; 16	TAL; 11	CAL; 19	RCH; 5	NHA; 10	NZH; 32	CLT; 8	DOV; 10	NSH; 39	KEN; 35	MLW; 30	DAY; 9	CHI; 16	GTY; 3	PPR; 11	IRP; 30	MCH; 31	BRI; 20	DAR; 14	RCH; 33	DOV; 35	KAN; QL^{†}	CLT	MEM; 29	ATL; 25	CAR; 31	PHO; 13	HOM; 35		24th	2885	
2003	Carroll Racing	26	Dodge	DAY; 30	CAR; 7	LVS; 17	DAR; 11	BRI; 26	TEX; 13	TAL; 25			RCH; 33	GTY; 32	NZH; 31	CLT; 34	DOV; 35	NSH	KEN	MLW; 35	DAY; 15	CHI; 18	NHA; 29	PPR; 8	IRP; 15	MCH	BRI; 13	DAR; 13	RCH	DOV; 19	KAN	CLT	MEM	ATL	PHO; 15	CAR; 20	HOM		19th	2498	
2003	Curb Racing	43	Dodge								NSH; 12																												19th	2498	
2003	Carroll Racing	90	Dodge									CAL; 22																											19th	2498	
2006	Mac Hill Motorsports	56	Chevy	DAY	CAL	MXC	LVS	ATL	BRI	TEX	NSH	PHO	TAL	RCH	DAR	CLT	DOV	NSH; 25	KEN; 25	MLW	DAY	CHI	NHA	MAR; 33	GTY; 10	IRP	GLN	MCH	BRI	CAL	RCH; 43	DOV	KAN	CLT	MEM	TEX	PHO	HOM	73rd	413	
^{†} - Qualified but replaced by Tim Fedewa

==== Craftsman Truck Series ====
NASCAR Craftsman Truck Series results
Year	Team	No.	Make	1	2	3	4	5	6	7	8	9	10	11	12	13	14	15	16	17	18	19	20	21	22	23	24	25	26	NCTC	Pts	Ref
1996	Grubb Motorsports	55	Chevy	HOM	PHO	POR	EVG	TUS	CNS	HPT	BRI	NZH	MLW	LVL	I70	IRP	FLM	GLN	NSV	RCH; 18	NHA	MAR; 35	NWS	SON	MMR	PHO	LVS			81st	167	
1997	Grubb Motorsports	55	Ford	WDW	TUS	HOM	PHO	POR	EVG	I70	NHA; 11	TEX	BRI																	63rd	301	
1997	Grubb Motorsports	55	Chevy											NZH; 13	MLW	LVL	CNS	HPT	IRP	FLM	NSV	GLN	RCH; DNQ	MAR; DNQ	SON	MMR	CAL	PHO	LVS	63rd	301	
2006	Billy Ballew Motorsports	15	Chevy	DAY	CAL	ATL	MAR	GTY	CLT	MFD	DOV	TEX	MCH	MLW	KAN	KEN; 21	MEM; 14	IRP; 33	NSH; 24	BRI	NHA	LVS	TAL	MAR	ATL	TEX	PHO	HOM		45th	376	

== See also ==
- List of sportspeople sanctioned for doping offences
