= Team Bristol Motorsports =

Former NASCAR team

- Owner: Rick Goodwin
- Base: Bristol, Virginia
- Series: Busch Series
- Race drivers: Kelly Denton, Tom Hubert, Steadman Marlin, Tim Fedewa, Kevin Grubb, Jerry Nadeau, Hermie Sadler
- Manufacturer: Chevrolet

Career
- Debut: 2001 Auto Club 300
- Latest race: 2003 Hardee's 250
- Races competed: 64

Team Bristol Motorsports was a former NASCAR Busch Series team owned by Rick Goodwin and was based out of Bristol, Virginia.

== Cup Series ==
=== 2002 ===
The team entered their only Cup race at the spring Richmond race with Kevin Grubb driving. They were 36th fastest in practice, which would've been fast enough to make the race, however during qualifying, Grubb spun out on his second lap and they would only record the 37th fastest time. Without any owner provisionals, they would be the only team that would fail to qualify for the race. The team had plans to run full time Cup in 2003 with Grubb, but the plans would fall through.

==== Car No. 54 results ====
NASCAR Winston Cup Series results
Year	Driver	No.	Make	1	2	3	4	5	6	7	8	9	10	11	12	13	14	15	16	17	18	19	20	21	22	23	24	25	26	27	28	29	30	31	32	33	34	35	36	Owners	Pts
2002	Kevin Grubb	54	Chevy	DAY	CAR	LVS	ATL	DAR	BRI	TEX	MAR	TAL	CAL	RCH; DNQ	CLT	DOV	POC	MCH	SON	DAY	CHI	NHA	POC	IND	GLN	MCH	BRI	DAR	RCH	NHA	DOV	KAN	TAL	CLT	MAR	ATL	CAR	PHO	HOM	74th	31

== Busch Series ==
=== 2001 ===
The team was formed early in the 2001 season, Kelly Denton was picked as the driver, with sponsorship coming from a local toy maker company, General Creation. They made their debut at California, finishing 34th. They would run a total of 20 races in their first season, with a pair of 13th-place finishes being the best result. Tom Hubert, Steadman Marlin, and Tim Fedewa all made a start late in the year.

=== 2002 ===
Denton drove the first two races in 2002, but would be released from the team after qualifying in Las Vegas. Kevin Grubb was named his replacement and would drive the remainder of the season. The team would also announce Toys "R" Us as their primary sponsor starting at the spring Bristol race. Grubb would secure the teams first top five finish a few weeks later at Richmond and would follow that up with another top ten in Loudon. A 3rd-place finish later in the season at Gateway would end up being the teams best result. After crashing out in back to back weeks, Grubb would sit out a few races due to dizziness symptoms he experienced while practicing in Kansas, Fedewa and Jerry Nadeau would fill in. At the end of the season, Grubb and the team would part ways.

=== 2003 ===
The team announced plans on having Deborah Renshaw drive full time for the 2003 season, however, after breaking her leg in a wreck that fatally killed Eric Martin, the deal fell through. Prior to the accident, she had plans on making her debut with the team in late 2002 at Memphis. Hermie Sadler would end up signing with the team to drive full time. Despite finishing a season best 11th at Richmond, Sadler asked for his release due to the team struggling financially. The team had lost their primary sponsorship and were going to skip the next few races. They would shut down soon after.

==== Car No. 54 results ====
NASCAR Busch Series results
Year	Driver	No.	Make	1	2	3	4	5	6	7	8	9	10	11	12	13	14	15	16	17	18	19	20	21	22	23	24	25	26	27	28	29	30	31	32	33	34	Owners	Pts
2001	Kelly Denton	54	Chevy	DAY	CAR	LVS	ATL	DAR	BRI	TEX	NSH	TAL	CAL; 34	RCH; 41	NHA	NZH; 24	CLT; 42	DOV; 16	KEN; 13	MLW; 13	GLN; 25	CHI; 40	GTY; 21	PPR; 25	IRP	MCH; 38	BRI; 37	DAR; 27	RCH; 42	DOV; 30	KAN				CAR; 28	HOM		39th	1405
2001	Tom Hubert	54	Chevy																													CLT; 35						39th	1405
2001	Steadman Marlin	54	Chevy																														MEM; 42					39th	1405
2001	Tim Fedewa	54	Chevy																															PHO; 26				39th	1405
2002	Kelly Denton	54	Chevy	DAY; 16	CAR; 27	LVS; QL																																23rd	3273
2002	Kevin Grubb	54	Chevy			LVS; 41	DAR; 32	BRI; 12	TEX; 24	NSH; 16	TAL; 11	CAL; 19	RCH; 5	NHA; 10	NZH; 32	CLT; 8	DOV; 10	NSH; 39	KEN; 35	MLW; 30	DAY; 9	CHI; 16	GTY; 3	PPR; 11	IRP; 30	MCH; 31	BRI; 20	DAR; 14	RCH; 33	DOV; 35	KAN; QL		MEM; 29	ATL; 25	CAR; 31	PHO; 13	HOM; 35	23rd	3273
2002	Tim Fedewa	54	Chevy																												KAN; 25							23rd	3273
2002	Jerry Nadeau	54	Chevy																													CLT; 20						23rd	3273
2003	Hermie Sadler	54	Chevy	DAY; 32	CAR; 20	LVS; 21	DAR; 29	BRI; 29	TEX; 21	TAL; 22	NSH; 19	CAL; 37	RCH; 11	GTY	NZH	CLT	DOV	NSH	KEN	MLW	DAY	CHI	NHA	PPR	IRP	MCH	BRI	DAR	RCH	DOV	KAN	CLT	MEM	ATL	PHO	CAR	HOM	43rd	907
