= 2002 Pontiac Excitement 400 =

11th race of the 2002 NASCAR Winston Cup Series

Race details
- Race 11 of 36 in the 2002 NASCAR Winston Cup Series
- The 2002 Pontiac Excitement 400 program cover, featuring Tony Stewart. Artwork by Garry Hill.
- Date: May 4–5 2002
- Official name: 48th Annual Pontiac Excitement 400
- Location: Richmond, Virginia, Richmond International Raceway
- Course: Permanent racing facility
- Course length: 0.75 miles (1.21 km)
- Distance: 400 laps, 300 mi (482.803 km)
- Scheduled distance: 400 laps, 300 mi (482.803 km)
- Average speed: 86.824 miles per hour (139.730 km/h)

Pole position
Driver	Ward Burton	Bill Davis Racing
- Time: 21.195

Most laps led
Driver	Ward Burton	Bill Davis Racing
- Laps: 125

Winner
No. 20	Tony Stewart	Joe Gibbs Racing

Television in the United States
- Network: FX
- Announcers: Mike Joy, Larry McReynolds, Darrell Waltrip

Radio in the United States
- Radio: Motor Racing Network

The 2002 Pontiac Excitement 400 was the 11th stock car race of the 2002 NASCAR Winston Cup Series and the 48th iteration of the event. The race was held throughout the days of May 4–5, 2002 due to rain forcing the delay of the race from its scheduled Sunday date. The race was held in Richmond, Virginia, at Richmond International Raceway, a 0.75 miles (1.21 km) D-shaped oval. The race took the scheduled 400 laps to complete. At race's end, Tony Stewart, driving for Joe Gibbs Racing, would win a crash-marred and wild race after taking control of the final restart with 18 to go. The win was Stewart's 14th career NASCAR Winston Cup Series win and his second of the season. To fill out the podium, Ryan Newman of Penske Racing and Jeff Burton of Roush Racing would finish second and third, respectively.

== Background ==
The layout of Richmond International Raceway, the venue where the race was at.

Richmond International Raceway (RIR) is a 3/4-mile (1.2 km), D-shaped, asphalt race track located just outside Richmond, Virginia in Henrico County.

=== Entry list ===
- (R) denotes rookie driver.

#	Driver	Team	Make
1	Steve Park	Dale Earnhardt, Inc.	Chevrolet
2	Rusty Wallace	Penske Racing	Ford
02	Hermie Sadler	SCORE Motorsports	Chevrolet
4	Mike Skinner	Morgan–McClure Motorsports	Chevrolet
5	Terry Labonte	Hendrick Motorsports	Chevrolet
6	Mark Martin	Roush Racing	Ford
7	Casey Atwood	Ultra-Evernham Motorsports	Dodge
8	Dale Earnhardt Jr.	Dale Earnhardt, Inc.	Chevrolet
9	Bill Elliott	Evernham Motorsports	Dodge
10	Johnny Benson Jr.*	MBV Motorsports	Pontiac
11	Brett Bodine	Brett Bodine Racing	Ford
12	Ryan Newman (R)	Penske Racing	Ford
14	Stacy Compton	A. J. Foyt Enterprises	Pontiac
15	Michael Waltrip	Dale Earnhardt, Inc.	Chevrolet
17	Matt Kenseth	Roush Racing	Ford
18	Bobby Labonte	Joe Gibbs Racing	Pontiac
19	Jeremy Mayfield	Evernham Motorsports	Dodge
20	Tony Stewart	Joe Gibbs Racing	Pontiac
21	Elliott Sadler	Wood Brothers Racing	Ford
22	Ward Burton	Bill Davis Racing	Dodge
23	Hut Stricklin	Bill Davis Racing	Dodge
24	Jeff Gordon	Hendrick Motorsports	Chevrolet
25	Jerry Nadeau	Hendrick Motorsports	Chevrolet
26	Frank Kimmel	Haas-Carter Motorsports	Ford
28	Ricky Rudd	Robert Yates Racing	Ford
29	Kevin Harvick	Richard Childress Racing	Chevrolet
30	Jeff Green	Richard Childress Racing	Chevrolet
31	Robby Gordon	Richard Childress Racing	Chevrolet
32	Ricky Craven	PPI Motorsports	Ford
36	Ken Schrader	MB2 Motorsports	Pontiac
40	Sterling Marlin	Chip Ganassi Racing	Dodge
41	Jimmy Spencer	Chip Ganassi Racing	Dodge
43	John Andretti	Petty Enterprises	Dodge
44	Steve Grissom	Petty Enterprises	Dodge
45	Kyle Petty	Petty Enterprises	Dodge
48	Jimmie Johnson (R)	Hendrick Motorsports	Chevrolet
54	Kevin Grubb	Team Bristol Motorsports	Chevrolet
55	Bobby Hamilton	Andy Petree Racing	Chevrolet
59	Randy Renfrow	Price Motorsports	Dodge
77	Dave Blaney	Jasper Motorsports	Ford
88	Dale Jarrett	Robert Yates Racing	Ford
90	Rick Mast	Donlavey Racing	Ford
97	Kurt Busch	Roush Racing	Ford
99	Jeff Burton	Roush Racing	Ford
Official entry list

*Driver changed to Joe Nemechek for the race, as Benson Jr. had suffered injuries during the 2002 Hardee's 250, the preliminary Busch race.

== Practice ==
=== First practice ===
The first practice session was held on Friday, May 3, at 11:20 AM EST, and would last for two hours. Tony Stewart of Joe Gibbs Racing would set the fastest time in the session, with a lap of 20.996 and an average speed of 128.589 miles per hour (206.944 km/h).

During the session, Dale Jarrett and Kurt Busch would both crash in separate incidents.

Pos.	#	Driver	Team	Make	Time	Speed
1	20	Tony Stewart	Joe Gibbs Racing	Pontiac	20.996	128.589
2	22	Ward Burton	Bill Davis Racing	Dodge	21.010	128.509
3	99	Jeff Burton	Roush Racing	Ford	21.010	128.509
Full first practice results

=== Second practice ===
The second practice session was held on Friday, May 3, at 4:45 PM EST, and would last for 45 minutes. Johnny Benson Jr. of MBV Motorsports would set the fastest time in the session, with a lap of 21.502 and an average speed of 125.569 miles per hour (202.084 km/h).

Pos.	#	Driver	Team	Make	Time	Speed
1	10	Johnny Benson Jr.	MBV Motorsports	Pontiac	21.502	125.569
2	28	Ricky Rudd	Robert Yates Racing	Ford	21.535	125.371
3	30	Jeff Green	Richard Childress Racing	Chevrolet	21.556	125.249
Full second practice results

=== Third and final practice ===
The third and final practice session, sometimes referred to as Happy Hour, was held on Friday, May 3, at 6:15 PM EST, and would last for 45 minutes. Johnny Benson Jr. of MBV Motorsports would set the fastest time in the session, with a lap of 21.527 and an average speed of 125.424 miles per hour (201.850 km/h).

Pos.	#	Driver	Team	Make	Time	Speed
1	10	Johnny Benson Jr.	MBV Motorsports	Pontiac	21.527	125.424
2	22	Ward Burton	Bill Davis Racing	Dodge	21.579	125.122
3	28	Ricky Rudd	Robert Yates Racing	Ford	21.593	125.035
Full Happy Hour practice results

== Qualifying ==
Qualifying was held on Friday, May 3, at 3:05 PM EST. Each driver would have two laps to set a fastest time; the fastest of the two would count as their official qualifying lap. Positions 1-36 would be decided on time, while positions 37-43 would be based on provisionals. Six spots are awarded by the use of provisionals based on owner's points. The seventh is awarded to a past champion who has not otherwise qualified for the race. If no past champ needs the provisional, the next team in the owner points will be awarded a provisional.

Ward Burton of Bill Davis Racing would win the pole, setting a time of 21.195 and an average speed of 127.388 miles per hour (205.011 km/h).

Kevin Grubb was the only driver to fail to qualify.

=== Full qualifying results ===
Pos.	#	Driver	Team	Make	Time	Speed
1	22	Ward Burton	Bill Davis Racing	Dodge	21.195	127.388
2	8	Dale Earnhardt Jr.	Dale Earnhardt, Inc.	Chevrolet	21.230	127.178
3	20	Tony Stewart	Joe Gibbs Racing	Pontiac	21.250	127.059
4	24	Jeff Gordon	Hendrick Motorsports	Chevrolet	21.264	126.975
5	1	Steve Park	Dale Earnhardt, Inc.	Chevrolet	21.312	126.689
6	45	Kyle Petty	Petty Enterprises	Dodge	21.328	126.594
7	17	Matt Kenseth	Roush Racing	Ford	21.333	126.564
8	18	Bobby Labonte	Joe Gibbs Racing	Pontiac	21.337	126.541
9	2	Rusty Wallace	Penske Racing	Ford	21.338	126.535
10	32	Ricky Craven	PPI Motorsports	Ford	21.340	126.523
11	12	Ryan Newman (R)	Penske Racing	Ford	21.347	126.481
12	28	Ricky Rudd	Robert Yates Racing	Ford	21.353	126.446
13	25	Jerry Nadeau	Hendrick Motorsports	Chevrolet	21.369	126.351
14	30	Jeff Green	Richard Childress Racing	Chevrolet	21.377	126.304
15	5	Terry Labonte	Hendrick Motorsports	Chevrolet	21.381	126.280
16	10	Johnny Benson Jr.	MBV Motorsports	Pontiac	21.383	126.269
17	19	Jeremy Mayfield	Evernham Motorsports	Dodge	21.397	126.186
18	6	Mark Martin	Roush Racing	Ford	21.402	126.156
19	4	Mike Skinner	Morgan–McClure Motorsports	Chevrolet	21.402	126.156
20	44	Steve Grissom	Petty Enterprises	Dodge	21.413	126.092
21	21	Elliott Sadler	Wood Brothers Racing	Ford	21.431	125.986
22	36	Ken Schrader	MB2 Motorsports	Pontiac	21.437	125.951
23	99	Jeff Burton	Roush Racing	Ford	21.438	125.945
24	90	Rick Mast	Donlavey Racing	Ford	21.440	125.933
25	29	Kevin Harvick	Richard Childress Racing	Chevrolet	21.445	125.904
26	48	Jimmie Johnson (R)	Hendrick Motorsports	Chevrolet	21.449	125.880
27	15	Michael Waltrip	Dale Earnhardt, Inc.	Chevrolet	21.457	125.833
28	77	Dave Blaney	Jasper Motorsports	Ford	21.485	125.669
29	7	Casey Atwood	Ultra-Evernham Motorsports	Dodge	21.486	125.663
30	02	Hermie Sadler	SCORE Motorsports	Chevrolet	21.488	125.651
31	14	Stacy Compton	A. J. Foyt Enterprises	Pontiac	21.537	125.366
32	23	Hut Stricklin	Bill Davis Racing	Dodge	21.538	125.360
33	11	Brett Bodine	Brett Bodine Racing	Ford	21.542	125.337
34	31	Robby Gordon	Richard Childress Racing	Chevrolet	21.555	125.261
35	40	Sterling Marlin	Chip Ganassi Racing	Dodge	21.557	125.249
36	55	Bobby Hamilton	Andy Petree Racing	Chevrolet	21.585	125.087
Provisionals
37	97	Kurt Busch	Roush Racing	Ford	21.887	123.361
38	9	Bill Elliott	Evernham Motorsports	Dodge	21.781	123.961
39	88	Dale Jarrett	Robert Yates Racing	Ford	21.814	123.774
40	41	Jimmy Spencer	Chip Ganassi Racing	Dodge	21.824	123.717
41	43	John Andretti	Petty Enterprises	Dodge	21.670	124.596
42	26	Frank Kimmel	Haas-Carter Motorsports	Ford	22.343	120.843
43	59	Randy Renfrow	Price Motorsports	Dodge	22.029	122.566
Failed to qualify
44	54	Kevin Grubb	Team Bristol Motorsports	Chevrolet	21.632	124.815
Official qualifying results

== Race results ==
Fin	St	#	Driver	Team	Make	Laps	Led	Status	Pts	Winnings
1	3	20	Tony Stewart	Joe Gibbs Racing	Pontiac	400	28	running	180	$185,653
2	11	12	Ryan Newman (R)	Penske Racing	Ford	400	48	running	175	$121,950
3	23	99	Jeff Burton	Roush Racing	Ford	400	0	running	165	$126,067
4	18	6	Mark Martin	Roush Racing	Ford	400	0	running	160	$106,708
5	17	19	Jeremy Mayfield	Evernham Motorsports	Dodge	400	0	running	155	$67,950
6	7	17	Matt Kenseth	Roush Racing	Ford	400	0	running	150	$68,000
7	4	24	Jeff Gordon	Hendrick Motorsports	Chevrolet	400	0	running	146	$99,403
8	20	44	Steve Grissom	Petty Enterprises	Dodge	400	0	running	142	$60,875
9	10	32	Ricky Craven	PPI Motorsports	Ford	400	0	running	138	$59,975
10	40	41	Jimmy Spencer	Chip Ganassi Racing	Dodge	400	75	running	139	$74,275
11	35	40	Sterling Marlin	Chip Ganassi Racing	Dodge	400	0	running	130	$87,692
12	16	10	Joe Nemechek	MBV Motorsports	Pontiac	400	0	running	127	$74,710
13	14	30	Jeff Green	Richard Childress Racing	Chevrolet	400	2	running	129	$43,575
14	38	9	Bill Elliott	Evernham Motorsports	Dodge	400	0	running	121	$73,531
15	22	36	Ken Schrader	MB2 Motorsports	Pontiac	400	0	running	118	$68,335
16	32	23	Hut Stricklin	Bill Davis Racing	Dodge	400	0	running	115	$54,700
17	36	55	Bobby Hamilton	Andy Petree Racing	Chevrolet	399	5	running	117	$62,289
18	30	02	Hermie Sadler	SCORE Motorsports	Chevrolet	399	0	running	109	$42,050
19	33	11	Brett Bodine	Brett Bodine Racing	Ford	399	0	running	106	$45,525
20	41	43	John Andretti	Petty Enterprises	Dodge	399	0	running	103	$74,508
21	21	21	Elliott Sadler	Wood Brothers Racing	Ford	399	0	running	100	$52,550
22	29	7	Casey Atwood	Ultra-Evernham Motorsports	Dodge	399	0	running	97	$45,325
23	6	45	Kyle Petty	Petty Enterprises	Dodge	399	0	running	94	$40,825
24	27	15	Michael Waltrip	Dale Earnhardt, Inc.	Chevrolet	398	3	running	96	$51,850
25	9	2	Rusty Wallace	Penske Racing	Ford	396	0	running	88	$84,750
26	31	14	Stacy Compton	A. J. Foyt Enterprises	Pontiac	395	0	running	85	$43,475
27	37	97	Kurt Busch	Roush Racing	Ford	395	0	running	82	$51,650
28	19	4	Mike Skinner	Morgan–McClure Motorsports	Chevrolet	378	0	running	79	$43,125
29	28	77	Dave Blaney	Jasper Motorsports	Ford	377	10	engine	81	$50,500
30	1	22	Ward Burton	Bill Davis Racing	Dodge	364	125	running	83	$98,375
36	2	8	Dale Earnhardt Jr.	Dale Earnhardt, Inc.	Chevrolet	327	0	running	55	$76,862
31	26	48	Jimmie Johnson (R)	Hendrick Motorsports	Chevrolet	360	0	running	70	$40,325
32	8	18	Bobby Labonte	Joe Gibbs Racing	Pontiac	351	0	running	67	$86,053
33	15	5	Terry Labonte	Hendrick Motorsports	Chevrolet	333	0	crash	64	$69,058
34	5	1	Steve Park	Dale Earnhardt, Inc.	Chevrolet	333	0	crash	61	$70,050
35	24	90	Rick Mast	Donlavey Racing	Ford	331	0	crash	58	$40,125
37	34	31	Robby Gordon	Richard Childress Racing	Chevrolet	309	0	crash	52	$66,081
38	39	88	Dale Jarrett	Robert Yates Racing	Ford	309	14	running	54	$87,753
39	12	28	Ricky Rudd	Robert Yates Racing	Ford	308	90	crash	51	$84,317
40	25	29	Kevin Harvick	Richard Childress Racing	Chevrolet	295	0	running	43	$85,603
41	13	25	Jerry Nadeau	Hendrick Motorsports	Chevrolet	225	0	crash	40	$47,765
42	42	26	Frank Kimmel	Haas-Carter Motorsports	Ford	213	0	crash	37	$64,892
43	43	59	Randy Renfrow	Price Motorsports	Dodge	58	0	oil pump	34	$39,667
Official race results

Previous race: 2002 NAPA Auto Parts 500	NASCAR Winston Cup Series; 2002 season	Next race: 2002 Coca-Cola Racing Family 600
