= Pennzoil 400 =

Pennzoil 400 may refer to either of two annual NASCAR Cup Series stock car races:

- Pennzoil 400 (Homestead-Miami), the lone Cup race at Homestead-Miami Speedway, Florida; known by this name in 1999 and 2000.
- Pennzoil 400 (Las Vegas), the spring Cup race at Las Vegas Motor Speedway, Nevada; known by this name from 2018 to present.
