= Kelly Denton =

American racing driver (born 1973)

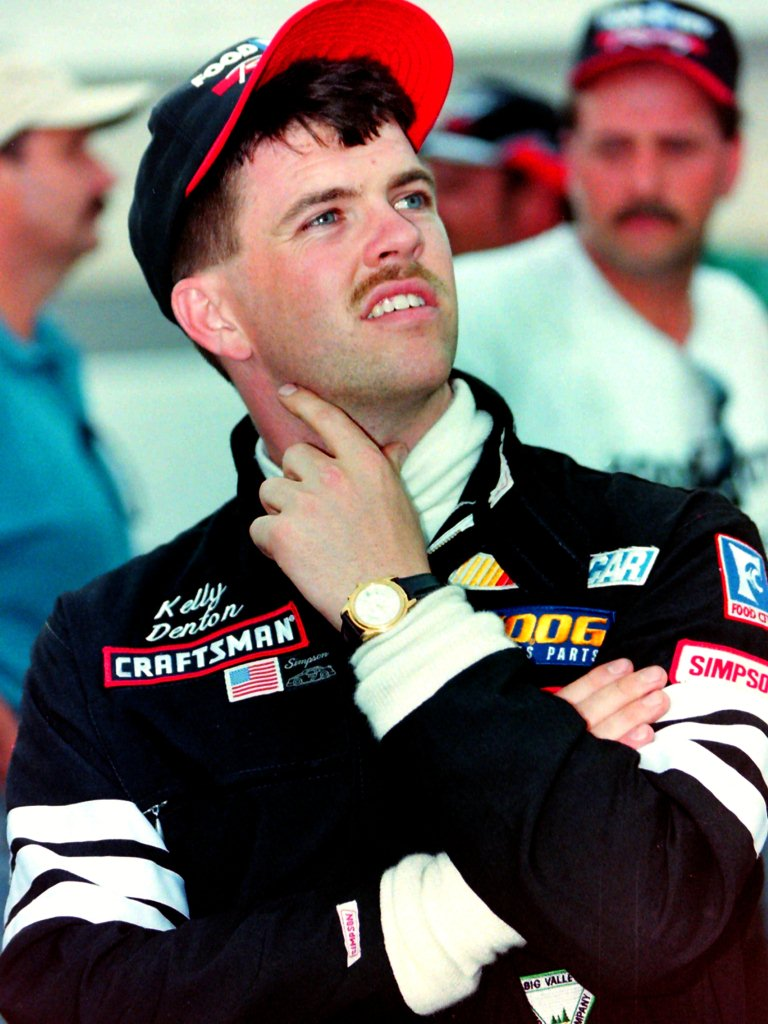
- Denton in 1997
- Born: March 10, 1973 (age 53); Bristol, Virginia, U.S.

NASCAR O'Reilly Auto Parts Series career
- 36 races run over 5 years
- Best finish: 30th (2001)
- First race: 1998 Moore's Snacks 250 (Bristol)
- Last race: 2002 1-866RBCTerm.com 200 (Rockingham)
Wins	Top tens	Poles
0	0	0

NASCAR FedEx Freight Truck Series career
- 10 races run over 2 years
- Best finish: 35th (1997)
- First race: 1996 Hanes 250 (Martinsville)
- Last race: 1997 Dodge California Truckstop 300 (Bakersfield)
Wins	Top tens	Poles
0	0	0

Kelly Denton (born March 10, 1973) is an American former professional stock car racing driver who competed in NASCAR between 1996 and 2002.

== Racing career ==
=== Craftsman Truck Series ===
Denton drove a second Grier Lackey Dodge in two races in 1996. He piloted the No. 03 Mopar Dodge in his first career race at Martinsville Speedway, starting in 8th place, but finished last (36th) after mechanical woes. He also ran the next race at North Wilkesboro Speedway, starting seventh and finishing 18th.

Denton would make eight starts in 1997, driving for Lackey in the first five of those starts. Denton started fifth at Walt Disney World Speedway before finishing 23rd. Denton had his best run for Lackley with a 16th at Phoenix International Speedway in April, and then bettered that with a 12th-place finish at Bristol Motor Speedway. Denton switched over to the No. 35 Charles Hardy-owned car and completed three races for the team. His best run was an 18th at Martinsville.

=== Busch Series ===
Denton ran the majority of his early Busch Series career for Henderson Motorsports, beginning in 1998. He made his first career start by starting 18th at Bristol and coming home 33rd in the No. 75 for Henderson. Denton also made the fall race, but finished 43rd after an early engine expiration.

In 1999, Denton hoped to run for NASCAR Busch Series Rookie of the Year honors for Henderson with sponsorship from Big Daddy's BBQ Sauce. Unfortunately, the sponsorship deal was canceled, forcing Denton to make only four starts. He started the season off with a finish of 20th at Talladega Superspeedway and that ended up being his best career finish. He was also 22nd at Rockingham in addition to the two Bristol races. Denton finished 41st and 34th in those Bristol races.

Denton would make four starts in 2000, as he finished 38th in the season opening race at Daytona International Speedway. He also went on to once again compete the season races at Bristol. He recorded his best career finish in the spring, as he ended up 15th. However, he only managed 34th in the fall event. Denton also ran for Moy Racing, who hired Denton to drive their No. 77 Ford at Homestead-Miami Speedway, where he finished 30th.

Denton ran 24 of 33 races in 2001. He completed the first six races for Moy, recording a pair of 18ths at Bristol and Daytona. Denton then jumped ship and moved to the No. 54 General Creation Chevy for Team Bristol Motorsports. Denton made most of the races for that team. His finishes were solid, as he recorded a pair of 13ths at the Milwaukee Mile and Kentucky Speedway along with a finish of 16th at Dover International Speedway, but lost his ride when the team shut down at the end of the year.

Denton made only two starts in 2002. Despite finishes of 16th at Daytona and 27th at Rockingham, Denton was released in favor of Kevin Grubb after qualifying for the third race at Las Vegas. Denton has not raced in major NASCAR since.

== Motorsports career results ==
=== NASCAR ===
(key) (Bold – Pole position awarded by qualifying time. Italics – Pole position earned by points standings or practice time. * – Most laps led.)

==== Busch Series ====
NASCAR Busch Series results
Year	Team	No.	Make	1	2	3	4	5	6	7	8	9	10	11	12	13	14	15	16	17	18	19	20	21	22	23	24	25	26	27	28	29	30	31	32	33	34	NBSC	Pts	Ref
1998	Henderson Motorsports	75	Chevy	DAY	CAR	LVS	NSV	DAR	BRI; 33	TEX	HCY	TAL	NHA	NZH	CLT; DNQ	DOV	RCH	PPR	GLN	MLW	MYB	CAL	SBO; DNQ	IRP	MCH	BRI; 43	DAR; DNQ	RCH	DOV	CLT; DNQ	GTY	CAR	ATL	HOM				103rd	98	
1999	Henderson Motorsports	75	Chevy	DAY; DNQ	CAR	LVS	ATL	DAR	TEX	NSV	BRI; DNQ	TAL; 20	CAL	NHA	RCH	NZH	CLT; 41	DOV	SBO	GLN	MLW	MYB	PPR	GTY	IRP	MCH	BRI; DNQ	DAR; 34	RCH	DOV; DNQ	CLT; DNQ	CAR; 22	MEM; DNQ	PHO	HOM			75th	306	
2000	Henderson Motorsports	75	Chevy	DAY; 38	CAR	LVS	ATL	DAR	BRI; 15	TEX	NSV; DNQ	TAL; DNQ	CAL	RCH	NHA	CLT	DOV	SBO	MYB	GLN	MLW	NZH	PPR	GTY	IRP	MCH	BRI; 34	DAR	RCH	DOV	CLT	CAR	MEM	PHO				71st	301	
2000	PRW Racing	77	Ford																																HOM; 30			71st	301	
2001	PRW Racing	77	Ford	DAY; 18	CAR; 27	LVS; 26	ATL; 37	DAR; 33	BRI; 18	TEX; 28	NSH	TAL																										30th	1863	
2001	Team Bristol Motorsports	54	Chevy										CAL; 34	RCH; 41	NHA	NZH; 24	CLT; 42	DOV; 16	KEN; 13	MLW; 13	GLN; 25	CHI; 40	GTY; 21	PPR; 25	IRP	MCH; 38	BRI; 37	DAR; 27	RCH; 42	DOV; 30	KAN	CLT	MEM	PHO	CAR; 28	HOM		30th	1863	
2002	Team Bristol Motorsports	54	Chevy	DAY; 16	CAR; 27	LVS; QL^{†}	DAR	BRI	TEX	NSH	TAL	CAL	RCH	NHA	NZH	CLT	DOV	NSH	KEN	MLW	DAY	CHI	GTY	PPR	IRP	MCH	BRI	DAR	RCH	DOV	KAN	CLT	MEM	ATL	CAR	PHO	HOM	84th	197	
^{†} - Qualified but replaced by Kevin Grubb

==== Craftsman Truck Series ====
NASCAR Craftsman Truck Series results
Year	Team	No.	Make	1	2	3	4	5	6	7	8	9	10	11	12	13	14	15	16	17	18	19	20	21	22	23	24	25	26	27	NCTC	Pts	Ref
1996	Grandaddy Racing	30	Dodge	HOM	PHO	POR	EVG	TUS	CNS	HPT	BRI	NZH	MLW	LVL	I70	IRP	FLM	GLN	NSV	RCH	NHA	MAR; 36	NWS; 18	SON	MMR	PHO	LVS				82nd	164	
1997	Grandaddy Racing	30	Chevy	WDW; 23	TUS; 27	HOM; 24	PHO; 16	POR	EVG	I70	NHA	TEX	BRI; 12	NZH	MLW	LVL	CNS	HPT	IRP	FLM	NSV	GLN									35th	764	
1997	Charles Hardy Racing	35	Chevy																				RCH; 31	MAR; 18	SON	MMR; 29	CAL	PHO	LVS		35th	764	
1998	Sasser-Fogleman & Associates	30	Chevy	WDW; DNQ	HOM	PHO	POR	EVG	I70	GLN	TEX	BRI	MLW	NZH	CAL	PPR	IRP	NHA	FLM	NSV	HPT	LVL	RCH	MEM	GTY	MAR	SON	MMR	PHO	LVS	136th	-	

==== Winston West Series ====
NASCAR Winston West Series results
Year	Team	No.	Make	1	2	3	4	5	6	7	8	9	10	11	12	13	14	Pos.	Pts	Ref
1997	Olson Technology Racing	31	Ford	TUS	AMP	SON	TUS	MMR	LVS	CAL	EVG	POR	PPR; 25	AMP	SON	MMR	LVS	76th	88	

=== ARCA Bondo/Mar-Hyde Series ===
(key) (Bold – Pole position awarded by qualifying time. Italics – Pole position earned by points standings or practice time. * – Most laps led.)

ARCA Bondo/Mar-Hyde Series results
Year	Team	No.	Make	1	2	3	4	5	6	7	8	9	10	11	12	13	14	15	16	17	18	19	20	21	22	23	24	25	ABMSC	Pts	Ref
1996	R.S. Jones & Associates	86	Ford	DAY; 12	ATL; 14	SLM	TAL; 10	FIF	LVL	**CLT**; 19	CLT; 5	KIL	FRS	POC	MCH; 2*	FRS	TOL	POC	MCH; 13	IND	SBS	ISF	DSF	KIL	SLM	WIN	CLT	ATL	32nd	-	
