= Jerry Nadeau =

American racing driver (born 1969)

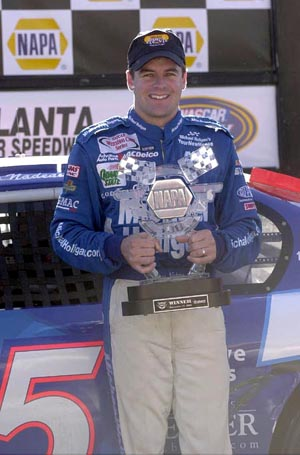
- Nadeau after winning the 2000 NAPA 500
- Born: September 9, 1970 (age 56); Danbury, Connecticut, U.S.

NASCAR Cup Series career
- 177 races run over 7 years
- Best finish: 17th (2001)
- First race: 1997 Miller 400 (Michigan)
- Last race: 2003 Auto Club 500 (California)
- First win: 2000 NAPA 500 (Atlanta)
Wins	Top tens	Poles
1	19	0

NASCAR O'Reilly Auto Parts Series career
- 8 races run over 3 years
- Best finish: 53rd (1995)
- First race: 1995 Sundrop 400 (Hickory)
- Last race: 2002 Little Trees 300 (Lowe's)
Wins	Top tens	Poles
0	0	0

NASCAR FedEx Freight Truck Series career
- 1 race run over 1 year
- Best finish: 97th (1998)
- First race: 1998 GM Goodwrench Service Plus / AC Delco 300 (Phoenix)
Wins	Top tens	Poles
0	0	0

ARCA Menards Series career
- 2 races run over 1 year
- Best finish: N/A (1997)
- First race: 1997 EasyCare Certified 100 (Charlotte)
- Last race: 1997 EasyCare Certified 200 (Charlotte)
Wins	Top tens	Poles
0	2	0

ARCA Menards Series West career
- 1 race run over 1 year
- Best finish: 53rd (1999)
- First race: 1999 The Orleans 150 (Las Vegas)
- First win: 1999 The Orleans 150 (Las Vegas)
Wins	Top tens	Poles
1	1	1
- Statistics up to date as of October 3, 2025.

Gerald Anthony Nadeau (born September 9, 1970) is an American former stock car racer. He competed in the NASCAR Winston Cup Series. He started racing go-karts before moving up to car racing, driving in the 12 Hours of Sebring, the European Formula Ford Festival, and the Barber Dodge Pro Series. Nadeau arrived in NASCAR, the highest and most expensive level of stock car racing in the United States, with a limited budget. He started racing part-time in NASCAR and finished sixth in the 1996 Formula Opel Euro Series.

He started full-time racing in 1998 and came third in that year's NASCAR Rookie of the Year award standings. After Nadeau took his first top-ten finish at Talladega Superspeedway in 1999, he won his first NASCAR sanctioned race in the Winston West Series at Las Vegas Motor Speedway. He earned his first Winston Cup victory at Atlanta Motor Speedway the following year. Nadeau achieved his top NASCAR season in 2001 when he finished seventeenth in points, but his racing career ended in 2003 after he suffered serious injuries in a practice crash. He attempted a comeback before moving on to mentor drivers.

== Early life and career ==
Nadeau was born on September 9, 1969, and grew up in Danbury, Connecticut. His parents were Gerald Joseph, a roofer, and veteran in the United States Army during the Vietnam War (1944–2007) and Pauline Cyr Nadeau. Nadeau's ancestors originate from St. John's Valley, Maine. He has one sister, Debbie. Nadeau was educated at Henry Abbott Technical High School and studied automotive technology. His family had connections to auto racing; Gerald raced modifieds at the Danbury Race Arena. Nadeau was given a go-kart by his father when he was four and one-half years old. He also worked with his father in the construction industry to support his career. Speaking about his father's role in his career, Nadeau said, "I learned a lot from my dad, Gerry, while I was growing up. He wasn't afraid to yell and get on my toes to do my job because he hated to lose and I hated to lose. He made me the hungriest guy on the race track."

At the age of seven, he came in first in the eight- to twelve-year-old karting championship held in Bethany, Connecticut. In 1988, aged eighteen, Nadeau won his first World Karting Association (WKA) Gold Cup championship. Motorsports Talent Scout, Dicken Wear, had seen Jerry race for a number of years in Karting and asked if he would like to drive his SCCA SS/C Toyota Celica at an EMRA open track event at Lime Rock Park. Jerry caught the eye of Skip Barber and a few other driving instructors that day. Afterward, he was introduced to Bruce MacInnes and fellow graduates Walter Bladstrom, Tom Cotter, Bill Fisher, Bob Kullas, Frank Martinelli, and Art Regan who gave Nadeau financial support. He defended his karting title for the next two years. In 1991, he took the WKA Grand National Championship. In the same year, Nadeau moved into car racing, driving in the Skip Barber Eastern Series. He took eight victories and became the Rookie of the Year. At the end of 1991, Nadeau won the $100,000 Barber Pro Series shoot-out, allowing him to race in the Barber Dodge Pro Series.

Nadeau drove alongside sports car driver Gene Felton for the Jill Prewitt team which entered the 1992 12 Hours of Sebring, but retired after forty-eight laps because of a differential problem. He also took part in karting events in St. Petersburg, Russia, competing on an ice track, winning two out of eight races. Nadeau later stated the experience helped him to develop the skill of not using his car's brakes on slippery surfaces. In 1993, he raced in the Barber Pro Series, where he finished with one win and took fifth in the points standings. Nadeau also drove in the European Formula Ford Festival winning the qualifying race and coming second in the semi-finals behind Formula Ford champion Peter Duke. Nadeau secured fourth in the final heat. He also took five, top-four finishes in the Firestone Firehawk Series. Nadeau improved in the Barber Pro Series in 1994 by finishing fifth in the championship with two victories. In 1995, he took two victories but fell to thirteenth overall in the standings.

== Auto racing career ==
=== 1990s ===
Nadeau entered eight NASCAR Busch Grand National Series races for T&G Racing in 1995. At that time, the Busch Grand National Series was considered NASCAR's feeder circuit, a proving ground for drivers who wished to step up to the organization's premiere circuit, the Winston Cup. It is comparable to Formula One's relationship with Formula 2/Formula 3000/GP2 Series. He originally signed to run fourteen season races. Nadeau moved to North Carolina that year on the advice of public relations worker Tom Cotter, and was on a budget of $200. He often went to Hendrick Motorsports to receive tips. Nadeau failed to qualify for his first career NASCAR race, which took place at Richmond International Raceway. Later that year, he finished 21st at Hickory, 29th at New Hampshire, 19th at the Myrtle Beach Speedway, 20th at the Milwaukee Mile, 31st at Lucas Oil Raceway, and did not qualify for the races at North Carolina Speedway or Homestead-Miami Speedway.

The following year, Nadeau moved to M.P.H. Racing and planned to run ten races in the Busch Series in 1996, in combination with a full season in the Formula Opel European Union Series Championship. He ran only two races in the Busch Series, finishing 39th in both races and did not qualify at Darlington. In Formula Opel, he drove a partial season, running in thirteen out of seventeen races for six teams and finished sixth overall, the highest for an American driver. He later declined a move into the Formula 3000 series, opting for a return to NASCAR. In November 1996, Nadeau and Barber Dodge Pro Series driver Tony Renna represented the United States in the EDFA Nations Cup held at Donington Park and won the silver medal, finishing behind Germany.

After returning from racing in Europe in 1997, Nadeau moved to the Winston Cup Series and signed a five-race contract with Precision Products Racing to replace Morgan Shepherd in the No. 1 Pontiac Grand Prix. During the first races, Nadeau was Shepherd's spotter, and worked on maintaining Shepherd's car before the races. Nadeau also built his own cars for Automobile Racing Club of America (ARCA) and Busch Series events. Nadeau made all five races, including a ninth place qualification at New Hampshire International Speedway, but failed to finish higher than thirtieth and was let go at the end of his contract when the team's sponsor expressed no interest in retaining him. In five races, he had zero top-ten finishes and two DNF's, and finished 54th in season points. He also took part in one race in the Busch Series at Talladega Superspeedway but failed to qualify. He made his first appearance in an ARCA Bondo/Mar-Hyde Series car and finished fourth and second in the races he entered. Nadeau's performances during the season caught the interest of 1988 Champion Bill Elliott and quarterback Dan Marino, and they offered him the chance to become their second driver.

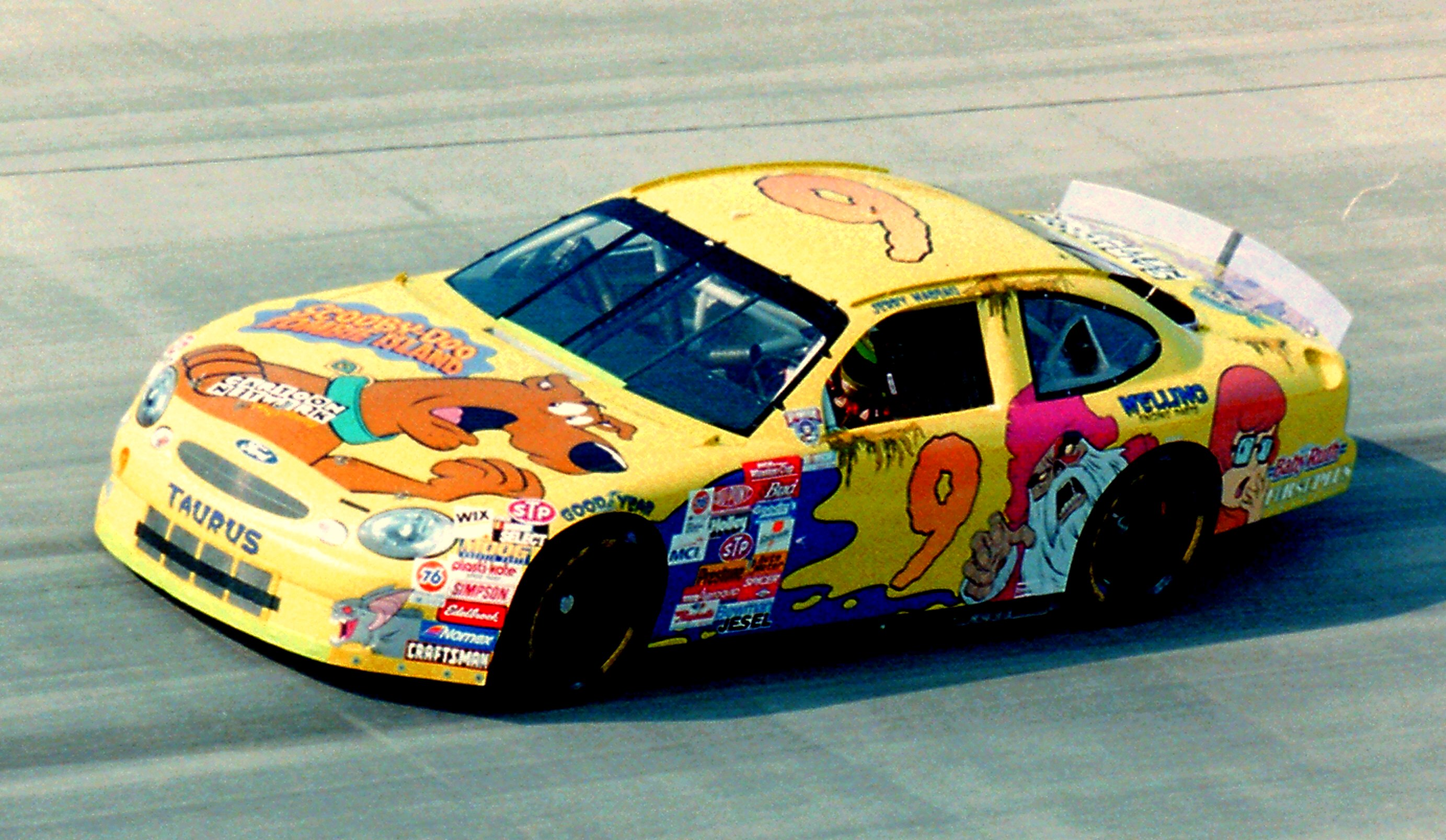
Nadeau in Melling's No. 9

Nadeau started his rookie season in 1998 with Elliott-Marino Racing driving the No. 13 Ford car, owned by Marino. After sixteen races, and missing one race due to food poisoning, he was released from his contract in July. One week later, he was signed to Melling Racing to drive the No. 9 car. Melling and Nadeau used the second half of the season to develop a consistent program in preparation for the 1999 season. He had zero top-ten finishes, seven DNFs, an average finish of 24.2, and two results in the top-twenty. Nadeau finished 36th in the Winston Cup points standings for that season and was third in the NASCAR Rookie of the Year Award standings. He entered his first and only race in the Craftsman Truck Series at Phoenix International Speedway finishing 27th.

The following year, Nadeau stayed with Melling and clinched his first top-ten finish at Talladega. In the first half of the year, he announced that he would leave Melling after the season ended. Two weeks after securing fifth at Watkins Glen, he substituted for the injured Ernie Irvan to drive the No. 36 Pontiac at MB2 Motorsports for the remainder of the season. In 34 races, he had two Top 10 finishes and finished 34th in season points. In that year, Nadeau won his first NASCAR-sanctioned event in the Winston West Series at Las Vegas Motor Speedway.

=== 2000s ===
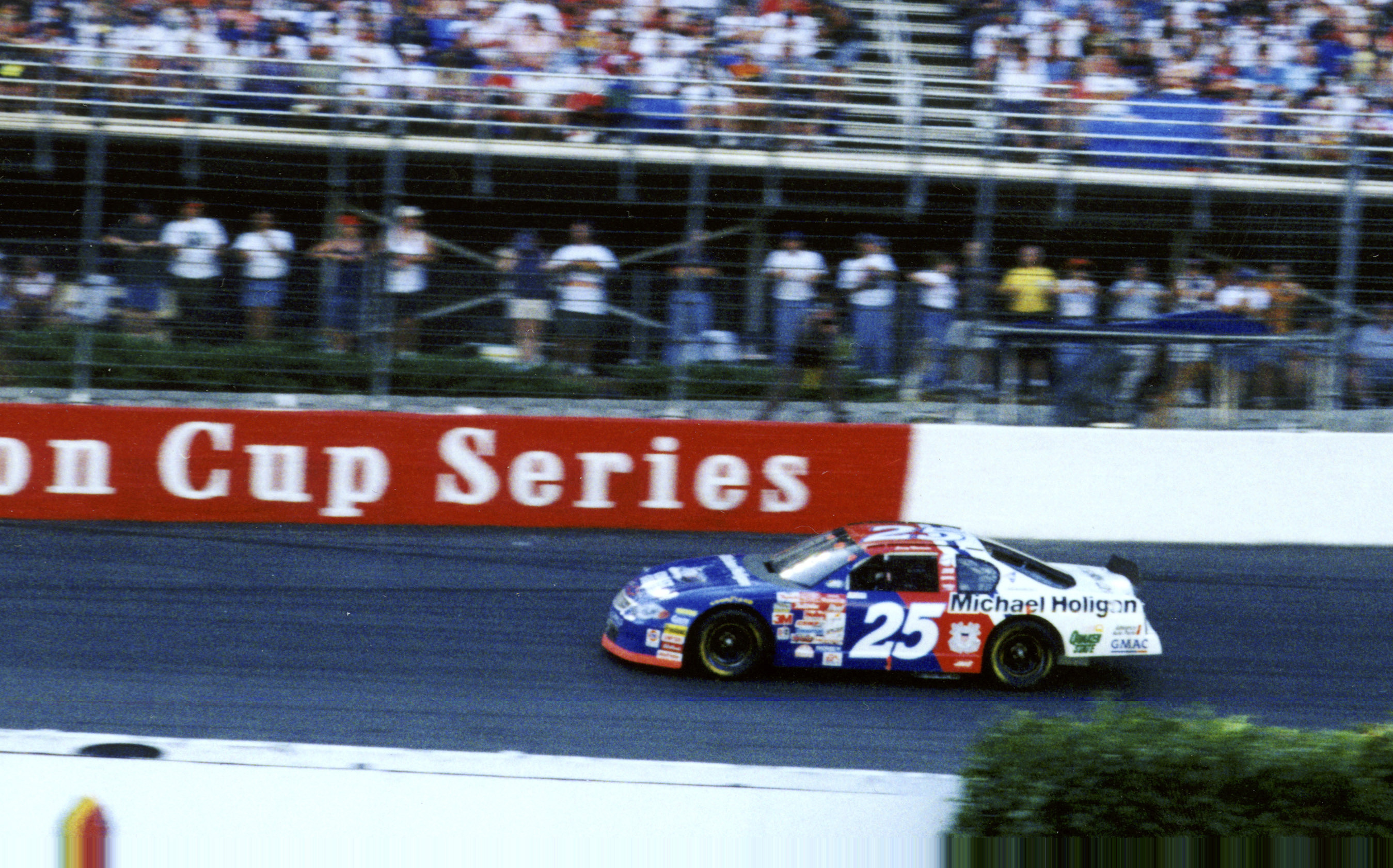
Nadeau's car in 2000.

For the 2000 season, Nadeau was hired by Hendrick Motorsports to drive the No. 25 Chevrolet, replacing Wally Dallenbach Jr. That year, Nadeau won his first NASCAR Winston Cup race in the season's final race at Atlanta Motor Speedway after passing Ward Burton seven laps from the end. Nadeau led 155 laps and won by 1.3 seconds. He became the first driver from Connecticut to win in the series. He finished the 2000 season with five top-ten finishes, nine DNF's, and an average finish of 23.1 in 34 events; Nadeau finished twentieth in the Winston Cup points standings for that season.

The following year, Nadeau stayed with Hendrick Motorsports. He nearly clinched victory in the penultimate race of the season at Atlanta, finishing fourth after running out of fuel midway through the final lap. In 36 races, Nadeau achieved ten top-ten finishes, eight DNFs, and an average finish of 21.1. He finished the season seventeenth in points. During 2001, Nadeau took part in the DIRT Motorsports Series with R&C Motorsports, and co-founded the Tom and Jerry Racing Team with Tom Cotter, which fielded USAC Sprint Car Series driver Tony Hunt.

Nadeau raced for four teams in 2002. He started the season by competing in eleven events for Hendrick Motorsports. He had his only top-ten finish of the year, taking eighth place at Bristol Motor Speedway. In early May, Nadeau and Hendrick Motorsports agreed to terminate his contract, citing a lack of performance. He was hired by MBV Motorsports to fill in for the injured Johnny Benson Jr. for three races, while Joe Nemechek took over Nadeau's former seat at Hendrick Motorsports. Afterward, Nadeau drove for Petty Enterprises at Sonoma where he came close to winning his second Winston Cup race, having a five-second lead with three laps to go but finishing 36th after his car suffered a broken rear-end gear on the race's 107th lap. He subsequently drove one race for Michael Waltrip Racing at Chicagoland Speedway, finishing 37th after a steering problem.

For the rest of the season, Nadeau was hired by Petty Enterprises to drive Steve Grissom's No. 44 Dodge car, although he injured his ribs and shoulder in a go-kart accident at his home before the Old Dominion 500. He was advised by team owner Kyle Petty to rest, and Grissom replaced Nadeau for the rest of the season. He had competed in 28 out of 36 races, with one Top 10 finish at the Food City 500, seven DNFs, and an average finish of 27.4. Nadeau finished the 2002 season 37th in points. He partnered sports car driver Anthony Lazzaro with the Rand Racing team in the Rolex Sports Car Series to finish first in the SRPII (Sports Racing Prototype) class at Daytona International Speedway, and in the Busch Series, he finished 20th at the fall Charlotte race.

Nadeau started the 2003 season as the driver of the MB2/MBV Motorsports No. 01 Pontiac Grand Prix, and quickly had a fourth place finish at Texas. On May 2, 2003, during a practice session at Richmond International Raceway for the Pontiac Excitement 400, Nadeau was leading the practice session when he suddenly swerved to avoid a slowing car, spun in turn one and hit the wall, driver's side first, at high speed. His car then slowly scraped across the wall for 50 feet before sliding to a complete stop. After he hit the wall, Nadeau responded to his crew before falling unconscious. NASCAR red-flagged the track to cut Nadeau out of his car. He was airlifted to a local hospital in critical condition, only given a six percent chance of surviving his injuries. Nadeau suffered complete immobility of the left side of his body, a skull fracture, concussion, a collapsed lung, and several broken ribs. The injuries required him to use a medical ventilator to breathe. Jason Keller raced for him at the Richmond race, Mike Skinner, Mike Wallace, and Boris Said raced the No. 01 until the fall Martinsville race, Joe Nemechek raced in the No. 01 for the remainder of the season and for the next few years as Nadeau's replacement.

== Post-racing career ==
In fall 2003, Nadeau began discussions with MB2 Motorsports boss Jay Frye about a long-term comeback. Frye gave Nadeau a test at Concord Speedway, where he was unable to feel his car's brake pedal. He also suffered a loss of stamina during this test. Because of the effects of his accident, Nadeau had to learn to walk. He also experienced slurred speech. He undertook physical therapy five times a week. This was later reduced to three when his condition improved. While Nadeau received a small financial settlement from NASCAR, it was not enough to pay for all of his rehabilitation, so he sold his large house near Lake Norman and moved to Davidson, North Carolina. He also suffered from depression caused by the loss of his racing career.

MB2 Motorsports entered into a partnership to create a recovery driving program for Nadeau which included competing in the Nextel Cup, the Busch Series and ARCA events in 2004. During that year, Nadeau served as a karting instructor at Lime Rock Park and returned to NASCAR as a spotter for Busch Series driver Todd Szegedy. He worked with the Clay Andrews Racing Busch Series team as a mentor for rookie David Gilliland in 2006, who went on to win the Meijer 300 and earned a ride with Robert Yates Racing later that season. He raced in the Old School Racing Champion's Tour in 2008. In 2011, Nadeau became a mentor to Truck Series rookie Jeffrey Earnhardt, son of Kerry and grandson of Dale. In 2012, Nadeau began involvement with the B.R.A.K.E.S. program in Lake Norman, North Carolina, which teaches children how to drive. In September 2013, he received a sports award from the Danbury Old Timers.

== Personal life ==
On December 11, 1999, Nadeau married long-time girlfriend Jada Blanchard in the Bahamas. Together, they have a daughter, Natalie Kate (born February 17, 2003). One year after Nadeau suffered his accident, the couple divorced. In 2012, Nadeau remarried to Maryana, a Ukrainian. He has a daughter from that relationship.

In a 2016 interview with Autoweek, Nadeau was candid about his life after the crash:

People don't understand how difficult it is living with a head injury. It's really hard; it sucks; it's aggravating. It feels like I'm a little off on things, a little slower. My left side is always numb, and my brain doesn't feel as sharp as it used to. And it's tough when people don't want to see or know about that. They draw a big X on you, and that's sad. It's like you're forgotten when you're out of the limelight. Nobody owes me anything, but somebody could maybe give me something (work-wise) to keep me involved. I used to make $5,000 for a two-hour appearance. Now, I have a hard time finding a job for anything. I hate to say it, but sometimes I wish God had just taken me.

== Motorsports career results ==
=== NASCAR ===
(key) (Bold – Pole position awarded by qualifying time. Italics – Pole position earned by points standings or practice time. * – Most laps led. Small numbers denotes finishing position)

==== Winston Cup Series ====
NASCAR Winston Cup Series results
Year	Team	No.	Make	1	2	3	4	5	6	7	8	9	10	11	12	13	14	15	16	17	18	19	20	21	22	23	24	25	26	27	28	29	30	31	32	33	34	35	36	NWCC	Pts	Ref
1997	Precision Products Racing	1	Pontiac	DAY	CAR	RCH	ATL	DAR	TEX	BRI	MAR	SON	TAL	CLT	DOV	POC	MCH; 36	CAL; 38	DAY; 30	NHA; 39	POC; 33	IND	GLN	MCH	BRI	DAR	RCH	NHA	DOV	MAR	CLT	TAL	CAR	PHO	ATL					54th	287	
1998	Elliott-Marino Racing	13	Ford	DAY; 21	CAR; 28	LVS; DNQ	ATL; 32	DAR; 31	BRI; 37	TEX; DNQ	MAR; 27	TAL; 37	CAL; 26	CLT; 40	DOV	RCH; 38	MCH; 35	POC; 21	SON; 43	NHA; 27																				36th	2121	
1998	Melling Racing	9	Ford																		POC; 26	IND; 26	GLN; 15	MCH; 30	BRI; 32	NHA; 29	DAR; 32	RCH; 23	DOV; 36	MAR; 35	CLT; 35	TAL; 42	DAY; 19	PHO; 39	CAR; 24	ATL; 37				36th	2121	
1999	Melling Racing	9	Ford	DAY; 11	CAR; 31	LVS; 31	ATL; 27	DAR; 40	TEX; 24	BRI; 42	MAR; 32	TAL; 8	CAL; 20	RCH; 21	CLT; 20	DOV; 30	MCH; 26	POC; 23	SON; 34	DAY; 37	NHA; 36	POC; 38	IND; 31	GLN; 5	MCH; 29															34th	2686	
1999	MB2 Motorsports	36	Pontiac																							BRI; 20	DAR; 43	RCH; 18	NHA; 32	DOV; 16	MAR; 26	CLT; 34	TAL; 40	CAR; 37	PHO; 37	HOM; 38	ATL; 20			34th	2686	
2000	Hendrick Motorsports	25	Chevy	DAY; 35	CAR; 29	LVS; 20	ATL; 42	DAR; 37	BRI; 19	TEX; 43	MAR; 20	TAL; 19	CAL; 13	RCH; 30	CLT; 38	DOV; 42	MCH; 23	POC; 20	SON; 8	DAY; 15	NHA; 4	POC; 27	IND; 4	GLN; 38	MCH; 12	BRI; 32	DAR; 29	RCH; 10	NHA; 21	DOV; 33	MAR; 12	CLT; 36	TAL; 13	CAR; 27	PHO; 23	HOM; 12	ATL; 1*			20th	3273	
2001	Hendrick Motorsports	25	Chevy	DAY; 32	CAR; 15	LVS; 15	ATL; 3	DAR; 20	BRI; 30	TEX; 29	MAR; 10	TAL; 25	CAL; 8	RCH; 41	CLT; 13	DOV; 38	MCH; 28	POC; 19	SON; 31	DAY; 6	CHI; 37	NHA; 33	POC; 24	IND; 38	GLN; 6	MCH; 34	BRI; 20	DAR; 9	RCH; 14	DOV; 2	KAN; 12	CLT; 40	MAR; 24	TAL; 35	PHO; 24	CAR; 5	HOM; 33	ATL; 4	NHA; 6	17th	3675	
2002	Hendrick Motorsports	25	Chevy	DAY; 28	CAR; 25	LVS; 15	ATL; 30	DAR; 18	BRI; 8	TEX; 32	MAR; 39	TAL; 32	CAL; 26	RCH; 41																										37th	2250	
2002	MBV Motorsports	10	Pontiac												CLT; 28	DOV; 27	POC	MCH				NHA; 18																		37th	2250	
2002	Petty Enterprises	44	Dodge																SON; 34	DAY			POC; 36	IND; 24	GLN; 26	MCH; 32	BRI; 21	DAR; 41	RCH; 27	NHA; 28	DOV; 42	KAN; 27	TAL; 24	CLT; 13	MAR	ATL	CAR	PHO	HOM	37th	2250	
2002	Michael Waltrip Racing	00	Chevy																		CHI; 37																			37th	2250	
2003	MB2 Motorsports	01	Pontiac	DAY; 28	CAR; 26	LVS; 22	ATL; 31	DAR; 35	BRI; 28	TEX; 4	TAL; 36	MAR; 41	CAL; 14	RCH; INQ^{†}	CLT	DOV	POC	MCH	SON	DAY	CHI	NHA	POC	IND	GLN	MCH	BRI	DAR	RCH	NHA	DOV	TAL	KAN	CLT	MAR	ATL	PHO	CAR	HOM	45th	844	
^{†} - Career-ending injury in post-qualifying practice; Jason Keller raced

===== Daytona 500 =====
Year	Team	Manufacturer	Start	Finish
1998	Elliott-Marino Racing	Ford	26	21
1999	Melling Racing	Ford	25	11
2000	Hendrick Motorsports	Chevrolet	20	35
2001	Hendrick Motorsports	Chevrolet	5	32
2002	Hendrick Motorsports	Chevrolet	8	28
2003	MB2 Motorsports	Pontiac	42	28

==== Busch Series ====
NASCAR Busch Series results
Year	Team	No.	Make	1	2	3	4	5	6	7	8	9	10	11	12	13	14	15	16	17	18	19	20	21	22	23	24	25	26	27	28	29	30	31	32	33	34	NBSC	Pts	Ref
1995	T&G Racing	15	Ford	DAY	CAR	RCH; DNQ	ATL	NSV	DAR	BRI	HCY; 21	NHA; 29	NZH	CLT	DOV	MYB; 19	GLN	MLW; 20	TAL	SBO	IRP; 31	MCH	BRI	DAR	RCH	DOV	CLT	CAR; DNQ										53rd	455	
1995	T&G Racing	15	Chevy																										HOM; DNQ									53rd	455	
1996	M.P.H. Racing	59	Chevy	DAY	CAR	RCH; 39	ATL	NSV; 39	DAR; DNQ	BRI	HCY	NZH	CLT	DOV	SBO	MYB	GLN	MLW	NHA	TAL	IRP	MCH	BRI	DAR	RCH	DOV	CLT	CAR	HOM									85th	92	
1997	Precision Products Racing	01	Chevy	DAY	CAR	RCH	ATL	LVS	DAR	HCY	TEX	BRI	NSV	TAL; DNQ	NHA	NZH	CLT	DOV	SBO	GLN	MLW	MYB	GTY	IRP	MCH	BRI	DAR	RCH	DOV	CLT	CAL	CAR	HOM					NA	-	
1999	GTS Motorsports	90	Chevy	DAY	CAR	LVS	ATL	DAR	TEX	NSV	BRI	TAL	CAL	NHA	RCH	NZH	CLT; DNQ	DOV	SBO	GLN	MLW	MYB	PPR	GTY	IRP	MCH	BRI	DAR	RCH	DOV	CLT	CAR	MEM	PHO	HOM			NA	-	
2002	Team Bristol Motorsports	54	Chevy	DAY	CAR	LVS	DAR	BRI	TEX	NSH	TAL	CAL	RCH	NHA	NZH	CLT	DOV	NSH	KEN	MLW	DAY	CHI	GTY	PPR	IRP	MCH	BRI	DAR	RCH	DOV	KAN	CLT; 20	MEM	ATL	CAR	PHO	HOM	97th	103	

==== Craftsman Truck Series ====
NASCAR Craftsman Truck Series results
Year	Team	No.	Make	1	2	3	4	5	6	7	8	9	10	11	12	13	14	15	16	17	18	19	20	21	22	23	24	25	26	27	NCTC	Pts	Ref
1998	Reher-Morrison Racing	9	Chevy	WDW	HOM	PHO	POR	EVG	I70	GLN	TEX	BRI	MLW	NZH	CAL	PPR	IRP	NHA	FLM	NSV	HPT	LVL	RCH	MEM	GTY	MAR	SON	MMR	PHO; 27	LVS	97th	82	

==== Winston West Series ====
NASCAR Winston West Series results
Year	Team	No.	Make	1	2	3	4	5	6	7	8	9	10	11	12	13	14	NWWSC	Pts	Ref
1999	Melling Racing	9	Chevy	TUS	**LVS**; 1*	PHO	CAL	PPR	MMR	IRW	EVG	POR	IRW	RMR	LVS	MMR	MOT	53rd	185	

=== ARCA Bondo/Mar-Hyde Series ===
(key) (Bold – Pole position awarded by qualifying time. Italics – Pole position earned by points standings or practice time. * – Most laps led.)

ARCA Bondo/Mar-Hyde Series results
Year	Team	No.	Make	1	2	3	4	5	6	7	8	9	10	11	12	13	14	15	16	17	18	19	20	21	22	ABSC	Pts	Ref
1997	Precision Products Racing	01	Pontiac	DAY	ATL	SLM	CLT; 4	CLT; 2	POC	MCH	SBS	TOL	KIL	FRS	MIN	POC	MCH	DSF	GTW	SLM	WIN	CLT	TAL	ISF	ATL	N/A	–	
