= 2002 UAW-GM Quality 500 =

Race details
- Race 31 of 36 in the 2002 NASCAR Winston Cup Series
- Layout of Lowe's Motor Speedway
- Date: October 13, 2002
- Location: Lowe's Motor Speedway, Concord, North Carolina
- Course: Permanent racing facility
- Course length: 1.5 miles (2.414 km)
- Distance: 334 laps, 501 mi (806.281 km)
- Weather: Mild with temperatures approaching 69.8 °F (21.0 °C); wind speeds up to 12 miles per hour (19 km/h)
- Average speed: 141.481
- Attendance: 100,000

Pole position
Driver	Tony Stewart	Joe Gibbs Racing
- Time: N/A

Most laps led
Driver	Jamie McMurray	Chip Ganassi Racing
- Laps: 96

Winner
No. 40	Jamie McMurray	Chip Ganassi Racing

Television in the United States
- Network: NBC
- Announcers: Allen Bestwick, Benny Parsons and Wally Dallenbach Jr.

The 2002 UAW-GM Quality 500 was a NASCAR Winston Cup Series race held at Lowe's Motor Speedway on October 13. Qualifying was canceled because of rain showers, so points leader Tony Stewart started on the pole position. Jamie McMurray, subbing for an injured Sterling Marlin, won his first race in his second career start, setting a then new modern era NASCAR record for quickest win. The race would also be the final race for Donlavey Racing.

Rain caused the start of the race to be delayed over 3 hours. After the rain stopped, NASCAR decided to start the race under yellow for the first 5 laps as the track continued to dry. The race began at 3:45 pm Charlotte time (Eastern). Sunset time was 6:51 pm, the race was completed at 7:17, The late finish contributed to a large jump in ratings for the NBC telecast. NASCAR decided to move the fall race at Charlotte from Sunday afternoon to Saturday night for 2003.

McMurray would go on to a modest career in NASCAR's Cup Series, with his 2010 season being the most notable, winning Daytona and Indianapolis.

== Background ==
The race was held at Lowe's Motor Speedway in Concord, North Carolina. Lowe's Motor Speedway is a 1.5-mile (2.4 km) quad-oval track that hosted two other NASCAR Winston Cup Series races during the 2002 season, the Coca-Cola Racing Family 600 and The Winston. Construction of the speedway began in 1959 and finished in 1960 before the inaugural 600-mile race. Bruton Smith and Curtis Turner were the architects of the track, which is now operated by Smith's company, Speedway Motorsports.

== Race results ==
Pos	Grid	Car	Driver	Team	Make
1	5	40	Jamie McMurray	Chip Ganassi Racing	Dodge
2	18	18	Bobby Labonte	Joe Gibbs Racing	Pontiac
3	1	20	Tony Stewart	Joe Gibbs Racing	Pontiac
4	8	24	Jeff Gordon	Hendrick Motorsports	Chevrolet
5	6	2	Rusty Wallace	Penske Racing	Ford
6	3	48	Jimmie Johnson	Hendrick Motorsports	Chevrolet
7	14	99	Jeff Burton	Roush Racing	Ford
8	4	12	Ryan Newman	Penske Racing	Ford
9	13	8	Dale Earnhardt Jr.	Dale Earnhardt, Inc.	Chevrolet
10	21	77	Dave Blaney	Jasper Motorsports	Ford
11	15	15	Michael Waltrip	Dale Earnhardt, Inc.	Chevrolet
12	11	97	Kurt Busch	Roush Racing	Ford
13	39	44	Jerry Nadeau	Petty Enterprises	Dodge
14	12	88	Dale Jarrett	Robert Yates Racing	Ford
15	34	1	Steve Park	Dale Earnhardt, Inc.	Chevrolet
16	2	6	Mark Martin	Roush Racing	Ford
17	37	14	Mike Wallace	A. J. Foyt Racing	Pontiac
18	26	10	Johnny Benson	MBV Motorsports	Pontiac
19	28	21	Elliott Sadler	Wood Brothers Racing	Ford
20	22	45	Kyle Petty	Petty Enterprises	Dodge
21	24	5	Terry Labonte	Hendrick Motorsports	Chevrolet
22	20	29	Kevin Harvick	Richard Childress Racing	Chevrolet
23	30	43	John Andretti	Petty Enterprises	Dodge
24	36	4	Mike Skinner	Morgan-McClure Motorsports	Chevrolet
25	31	23	Kenny Wallace	Bill Davis Racing	Dodge
26	40	11	Brett Bodine	Brett Bodine Racing	Ford
27	29	55	Bobby Hamilton	Andy Petree Racing	Chevrolet
28	25	19	Jeremy Mayfield	Evernham Motorsports	Dodge
29	17	30	Jeff Green	Richard Childress Racing	Chevrolet
30	38	7	Casey Atwood	Ultra Motorsports	Dodge
31	32	36	Ken Schrader	MB2 Motorsports	Pontiac
32	23	41	Jimmy Spencer	Chip Ganassi Racing	Pontiac
33	27	22	Ward Burton	Bill Davis Racing	Dodge
34	7	17	Matt Kenseth	Roush Racing	Ford
35	9	9	Bill Elliott	Evernham Motorsports	Dodge
36	16	32	Ricky Craven	PPI Motorsports	Ford
37	33	26	Todd Bodine	Haas-Carter Motorsports	Ford
38	19	31	Robby Gordon	Richard Childress Racing	Chevrolet
39	10	28	Ricky Rudd	Robert Yates Racing	Ford
40	35	25	Joe Nemechek	Hendrick Motorsports	Chevrolet
41	43	02	Hermie Sadler	SCORE Motorsports	Chevrolet
42	42	49	Stacy Compton	BAM Racing	Dodge
43	41	90	Jason Hedlesky	Donlavey Racing	Ford

Failed to qualify: Carl Long (#59), Kirk Shelmerdine (#72), Scott Wimmer (#27), Jack Sprague (#60), Kerry Earnhardt (#83), Ron Hornaday Jr. (#54)

Previous race: 2002 EA Sports 500	Winston Cup Series; 2002 season	Next race: 2002 Old Dominion 500
