= 2002 NAPA Auto Parts 500 =

Race details
- Race 10 of 36 in the 2002 NASCAR Winston Cup Series season
- The 2002 NAPA Auto Parts 500 program cover, featuring Rusty Wallace.
- Date: April 28, 2002
- Official name: NAPA Auto Parts 500
- Location: California Speedway, Fontana, California
- Course: Permanent racing facility
- Course length: 2.0 miles (3.219 km)
- Distance: 250 laps, 500 mi (804.672 km)
- Weather: Temperatures reaching up to 75.9 °F (24.4 °C); wind speeds up to 11.1 miles per hour (17.9 km/h)
- Average speed: 150.088 miles per hour (241.543 km/h)

Pole position
Driver	Ryan Newman	Penske Racing

Most laps led
Driver	Kurt Busch	Roush Racing
- Laps: 102

Winner
No. 48	Jimmie Johnson	Hendrick Motorsports

Television in the United States
- Network: Fox Broadcasting Company
- Announcers: Mike Joy, Darrell Waltrip and Larry McReynolds

The 2002 NAPA Auto Parts 500 was a NASCAR Winston Cup Series stock car race held on April 28, 2002 at California Speedway in Fontana, California. Contested over 250 laps on the 2-mile (3.2-kilometre) asphalt D-shaped oval, it was the tenth race of the 2002 NASCAR Winston Cup Series season. Jimmie Johnson of Hendrick Motorsports won the race, his first career Winston Cup Series victory. Kurt Busch finished second and Ricky Rudd finished third.

== Background ==
The layout of California Speedway, the venue where the race was held.

The track, California Speedway, was a four-turn superspeedway that was 2 miles (3.2 kilometres) long. The track's turns were banked from fourteen degrees, while the front stretch, the location of the finish line, was banked at eleven degrees. Unlike the front stretch, the back straightaway was banked at three degrees.

== Summary ==
There were ten drivers who failed to finish the race; with five of the drivers forcing to leave the race due to terminal crashes while five other drivers had engine issues. Nearly 10% of the 199-minute race was held under a caution flag and the average green flag run was approximately 38 laps.

Dale Earnhardt Jr. suffered a concussion when Kevin Harvick slowed on the track and veered into Earnhardt Jr.'s path, causing Jr. to hit the outside retaining wall parallel on the driver's side (this was before SAFER barriers were installed). The impact bent the dashboard of Jr.'s car and severely disoriented him; this ultimately forced NASCAR to pass a regulation forcing drivers to take the ambulance ride to the infield care center every time they crashed (he did not admit to have this injury until mid-September, after which NASCAR also passed a new concussion protocol).

== Race results ==
Pos	Grid	No.	Driver	Team	Manufacturer	Laps	Points
1	4	48	Jimmie Johnson (R)	Hendrick Motorsports	Chevrolet	250	180
2	2	97	Kurt Busch	Roush Racing	Ford	250	180
3	37	28	Ricky Rudd	Robert Yates Racing	Ford	250	165
4	39	9	Bill Elliott	Evernham Motorsports	Dodge	250	165
5	26	6	Mark Martin (W)	Roush Racing	Ford	250	155
6	3	88	Dale Jarrett	Robert Yates Racing	Ford	250	155
7	25	40	Sterling Marlin	Chip Ganassi Racing	Dodge	250	146
8	10	2	Rusty Wallace (W)	Penske Racing	Ford	250	142
9	32	77	Dave Blaney	Jasper Motorsports	Ford	250	143
10	6	15	Michael Waltrip	Dale Earnhardt, Inc.	Chevrolet	250	139
11	16	30	Jeff Green	Richard Childress Racing	Chevrolet	250	130
12	40	31	Robby Gordon	Richard Childress Racing	Chevrolet	249	127
13	29	16	Greg Biffle	Roush Racing	Ford	249	124
14	1	12	Ryan Newman (R)	Penske Racing	Ford	249	126
15	11	10	Johnny Benson Jr.	MB2 Motorsports	Pontiac	249	118
16	17	24	Jeff Gordon (W)	Hendrick Motorsports	Chevrolet	249	115
17	19	45	Kyle Petty	Petty Enterprises	Dodge	249	112
18	27	22	Ward Burton	Bill Davis Racing	Dodge	249	109
19	38	99	Jeff Burton	Roush Racing	Ford	249	106
20	20	17	Matt Kenseth	Roush Racing	Ford	249	103
21	34	5	Terry Labonte	Hendrick Motorsports	Chevrolet	249	100
22	18	1	Steve Park	Dale Earnhardt, Inc.	Chevrolet	249	97
23	36	11	Brett Bodine	Brett Bodine	Ford	249	94
24	24	43	John Andretti	Petty Enterprises	Dodge	249	91
25	13	26	Joe Nemechek	Haas-Carter Motorsports	Chevrolet	249	88
26	5	25	Jerry Nadeau	Hendrick Motorsports	Chevrolet	249	85
27	22	41	Jimmy Spencer	Chip Ganassi Racing	Dodge	248	82
28	12	7	Casey Atwood	Ultra Motorsports	Dodge	248	79
29	8	20	Tony Stewart	Joe Gibbs Racing	Pontiac	247	76
30	30	55	Bobby Hamilton	Andy Petree Racing	Chevrolet	247	73
31	33	4	Mike Skinner	Morgan-McClure Motorsports	Chevrolet	247	70
32	42	90	Rick Mast	Donlavey Racing	Ford	246	67
33	41	44	Steve Grissom	Petty Enterprises	Dodge	244	64
34	28	18	Bobby Labonte	Joe Gibbs Racing	Pontiac	240	61
35	21	29	Kevin Harvick	Richard Childress Racing	Chevrolet	226	58
36	9	8	Dale Earnhardt Jr.	Dale Earnhardt, Inc.	Chevrolet	225	55
37	15	32	Ricky Craven	PPI Motorsports	Ford	193	52
38	14	19	Jeremy Mayfield (W)	Evernham Motorsports	Dodge	189	49
39	7	21	Elliott Sadler	Wood Brothers Racing	Ford	163	46
40	31	23	Hut Stricklin	Bill Davis Racing	Dodge	147	43
41	35	14	Stacy Compton	A. J. Foyt Racing	Pontiac	104	45
42	43	49	Shawna Robinson (R)	BAM Racing	Dodge	18	37
43	23	36	Ken Schrader	MB2 Motorsports	Pontiac	4	34

=== Race statistics ===
- Time of race: 3:19:53
- Average Speed: 150.088 miles per hour (241.543 km/h)
- Pole Speed: 187.432 miles per hour (301.643 km/h)
- Cautions: 5 for 24 laps
- Margin of Victory: 0.620 sec
- Lead changes: 20
- Percent of race run under caution: 9.6%
- Average green flag run: 37.7 laps

Previous race: 2002 Aaron's 499	NASCAR Winston Cup Series; 2002 season	Next race: 2002 Pontiac Excitement 400
