= 2002 Brickyard 400 =

Race details
- Race 21 of 36 in the 2002 NASCAR Winston Cup Series
- 2002 Brickyard 400 program cover
- Date: August 4, 2002
- Official name: Brickyard 400
- Location: Indianapolis Motor Speedway in Speedway, Indiana
- Course: Permanent racing facility
- Course length: 2.5 miles (4.023 km)
- Distance: 160 laps, 400 mi (643.738 km)
- Weather: Hot with temperatures approaching 91.9 °F (33.3 °C); wind speeds up to 20.8 miles per hour (33.5 km/h)
- Average speed: 125.033 miles per hour (201.221 km/h)

Pole position
Driver	Tony Stewart	Joe Gibbs Racing
- Time: 49.191

Most laps led
Driver	Bill Elliott	Evernham Motorsports
- Laps: 93

Winner
No. 9	Bill Elliott	Evernham Motorsports

Television in the United States
- Network: NBC
- Announcers: Allen Bestwick, Wally Dallenbach Jr. and Benny Parsons
- Nielsen ratings: 6.3/16 (10.2 million)

The 2002 Brickyard 400, the 9th running of the event, was a NASCAR Winston Cup Series race held on August 4, 2002, at Indianapolis Motor Speedway in Speedway, Indiana. Contested over 160 laps on the 2.5-mile (4.0-kilometre) speedway, it was the twenty-first race of the 2002 NASCAR Winston Cup Series season. Bill Elliott of Evernham Motorsports won the race.

This was the first race to feature the Steel and Foam Reduction (SAFER) barrier at Indianapolis that would be used to make racing accidents safer.

== Background ==
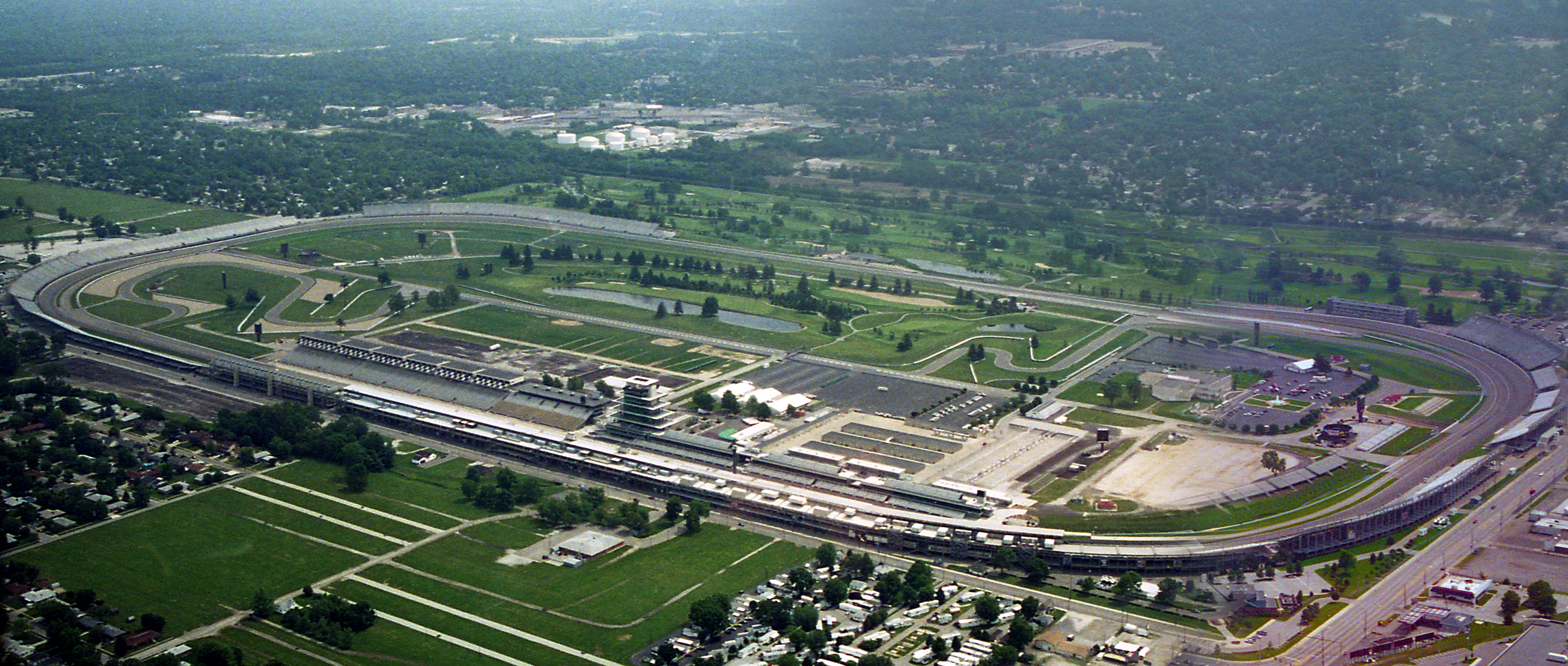
Indianapolis Motor Speedway, the track where the race was held.

The Indianapolis Motor Speedway, located in Speedway, Indiana, (an enclave suburb of Indianapolis) in the United States, is the home of the Indianapolis 500 and the Brickyard 400. It is located on the corner of 16th Street and Georgetown Road, approximately 6 miles (9.7 km) west of Downtown Indianapolis. It is a four-turn rectangular-oval track that is 2.5 miles (4.0 km) long. The track's turns are banked at 9 degrees, while the front stretch, the location of the finish line, has no banking. The back stretch, opposite of the front, also has a zero degree banking. The racetrack has seats for more than 250,000 spectators.

== Summary ==
Kurt Busch and Jimmy Spencer, locked in a burgeoning feud dating back to Bristol, collided on lap 36. Busch hit the turn 3 wall. Veteran Bill Elliott added the Brickyard to his long resume, and Rusty Wallace finished second for the third time.

Following the race, Tony Stewart was fined $50,000 ($89,500 adjusted for inflation) and placed into probation by his sponsor, Home Depot, for punching a photographer post-race.

== Race results ==
Pos	No.	Driver	Team	Manufacturer
1	9	Bill Elliott	Evernham Motorsports	Dodge
2	2	Rusty Wallace	Penske Racing	Ford
3	17	Matt Kenseth	Roush Racing	Ford
4	12	Ryan Newman	Penske Racing	Ford
5	29	Kevin Harvick	Richard Childress Racing	Chevrolet
6	24	Jeff Gordon	Hendrick Motorsports	Chevrolet
7	1	Steve Park	Dale Earnhardt, Inc.	Chevrolet
8	31	Robby Gordon	Richard Childress Racing	Chevrolet
9	48	Jimmie Johnson	Hendrick Motorsports	Chevrolet
10	88	Dale Jarrett	Robert Yates Racing	Ford
11	18	Bobby Labonte	Joe Gibbs Racing	Pontiac
12	20	Tony Stewart	Joe Gibbs Racing	Pontiac
13	5	Terry Labonte	Hendrick Motorsports	Chevrolet
14	36	Ken Schrader	MB2 Motorsports	Pontiac
15	77	Dave Blaney	Jasper Motorsports	Ford
16	15	Michael Waltrip	Dale Earnhardt, Inc.	Chevrolet
17	23	Hut Stricklin	Bill Davis Racing	Dodge
18	28	Ricky Rudd	Robert Yates Racing	Ford
19	30	Jeff Green	Richard Childress Racing	Chevrolet
20	25	Joe Nemechek	Hendrick Motorsports	Chevrolet
21	07	Ted Musgrave	Ultra Motorsports	Dodge
22	8	Dale Earnhardt Jr.	Dale Earnhardt, Inc.	Chevrlet
23	55	Bobby Hamilton	Andy Petree Racing	Chevrolet
24	44	Jerry Nadeau	Petty Enterprises	Dodge
25	45	Kyle Petty	Petty Enterprises	Dodge
26	43	John Andretti	Petty Enterprises	Dodge
27	40	Sterling Marlin	Chip Ganassi Racing	Dodge
28	6	Mark Martin	Roush Racing	Ford
29	99	Jeff Burton	Roush Racing	Ford
30	22	Ward Burton	Bill Davis Racing	Dodge
31	41	Jimmy Spencer	Chip Ganassi Racing	Dodge
32	98	Kenny Wallace	Innovative Motorsports	Chevrolet
33	32	Ricky Craven	PPI Motorsports	Ford
34	26	Todd Bodine	Haas-Carter Motorsports	Ford
35	21	Elliott Sadler	Wood Brothers Racing	Ford
36	4	Mike Skinner	Morgan-McClure Motorsports	Chevrolet
37	10	Johnny Benson	MB2 Motorsports	Pontiac
38	7	Casey Atwood	Ultra-Evernham Motorsports	Dodge
39	19	Jeremy Mayfield	Evernham Motorsports	Dodge
40	09	Geoff Bodine	Phoenix Racing	Ford
41	97	Kurt Busch	Roush Racing	Ford
42	11	Brett Bodine	Brett Bodine Racing	Ford
43	14	Mike Wallace	A. J. Foyt Racing	Pontiac

Failed to qualify: Ron Hornaday Jr. (#49), Derrike Cope (#37), Scott Wimmer (#27), Tony Raines (#74), Jim Sauter (#71), Stuart Kirby (#57), P. J. Jones (#50)

=== Race statistics ===
- Time of race: 3:11:57
- Average speed: 125.033 miles per hour (201.221 km/h)
- Pole speed: 182.960 miles per hour (294.446 km/h)
- Cautions: 8 for 36 laps
- Margin of Victory: 1.269 seconds
- Lead changes: 16
- Percent of race run under caution: 22.5%
- Average green flag run: 13.8 laps

Previous race: 2002 Pennsylvania 500	NASCAR Winston Cup Series; 2002 season	Next race: 2002 Sirius Satellite Radio at The Glen
