= 2002 Coca-Cola Racing Family 600 =

Race details
- Race 12 of 36 in the 2002 NASCAR Winston Cup Series
- The 2002 Coca-Cola Racing Family 600 program cover, featuring the drivers in the Coca-Cola Racing Family. Artwork by NASCAR artist Sam Bass. "Family Drive-In"
- Date: May 26, 2002
- Location: Lowe's Motor Speedway, Concord, North Carolina
- Course: Permanent racing facility
- Course length: 1.5 miles (2.4 km)
- Distance: 400 laps, 600 mi (965.606 km)
- Average speed: 137.729 miles per hour (221.653 km/h)

Pole position
Driver	Jimmie Johnson	Hendrick Motorsports

Most laps led
Driver	Jimmie Johnson	Hendrick Motorsports
- Laps: 263

Winner
No. 6	Mark Martin	Roush Racing

Television in the United States
- Network: Fox
- Announcers: Mike Joy, Darrell Waltrip, Larry McReynolds

The 2002 Coca-Cola Racing Family 600, the 43rd running of the event, was a NASCAR Winston Cup Series race held on May 26, 2002 at Charlotte Motor Speedway in Concord, North Carolina. Contested at 400 laps on the 1.5 mile (2.4 km) speedway, it was the twelfth race of the 2002 NASCAR Winston Cup Series season. Mark Martin of Roush Racing won the race. A record 4 in a row for Roush Racing. Matt Kenseth finished second and Ricky Craven finished third.

Failed to qualify: Chad Little (No. 74), Carl Long (No. 85), Derrike Cope (No. 37), Randy Renfrow (No. 59)

== Background ==
Lowe's Motor Speedway, the track where the race was held.

Lowe's Motor Speedway is a motorsports complex located in Concord, North Carolina, United States 13 miles from Charlotte, North Carolina. The complex features a 1.5 miles (2.4 km) quad oval track that hosts NASCAR racing including the prestigious Coca-Cola 600 on Memorial Day weekend and The Winston, as well as the fall race. The speedway was built in 1959 by Bruton Smith and is considered the home track for NASCAR with many race teams located in the Charlotte area. The track is owned and operated by Speedway Motorsports (SMI) with Humpy Wheeler as track president.

== Entry list ==
#	Driver	Team	Make
1	Steve Park	Dale Earnhardt, Inc.	Chevrolet
2	Rusty Wallace	Penske Racing South	Ford
4	Mike Skinner	Morgan–McClure Motorsports	Chevrolet
5	Terry Labonte	Hendrick Motorsports	Chevrolet
6	Mark Martin	Roush Racing	Ford
7	Casey Atwood	Ultra Motorsports	Dodge
8	Dale Earnhardt Jr.	Dale Earnhardt, Inc.	Chevrolet
9	Bill Elliott	Evernham Motorsports	Dodge
10	Jerry Nadeau	MB2 Motorsports	Pontiac
11	Brett Bodine	Brett Bodine Racing	Ford
12	Ryan Newman	Penske Racing South	Ford
14	Stacy Compton	A. J. Foyt Enterprises	Pontiac
15	Michael Waltrip	Dale Earnhardt, Inc.	Chevrolet
17	Matt Kenseth	Roush Racing	Ford
18	Bobby Labonte	Joe Gibbs Racing	Pontiac
19	Jeremy Mayfield	Evernham Motorsports	Dodge
20	Tony Stewart	Joe Gibbs Racing	Pontiac
21	Elliott Sadler	Wood Brothers Racing	Ford
22	Ward Burton	Bill Davis Racing	Dodge
23	Hut Stricklin	Bill Davis Racing	Dodge
24	Jeff Gordon	Hendrick Motorsports	Chevrolet
25	Joe Nemechek	Hendrick Motorsports	Chevrolet
26	Frank Kimmel	Haas-Carter Motorsports	Ford
28	Ricky Rudd	Robert Yates Racing	Ford
29	Kevin Harvick	Richard Childress Racing	Chevrolet
30	Jeff Green	Richard Childress Racing	Chevrolet
31	Robby Gordon	Richard Childress Racing	Chevrolet
32	Ricky Craven	PPI Motorsports	Ford
36	Ken Schrader	MB2 Motorsports	Pontiac
37	Derrike Cope	Quest Motor Racing	Ford
38	Kevin Lepage	Quest Motor Racing	Ford
40	Sterling Marlin	Chip Ganassi Racing	Dodge
41	Jimmy Spencer	Chip Ganassi Racing	Dodge
43	John Andretti	Petty Enterprises	Dodge
44	Steve Grissom	Petty Enterprises	Dodge
45	Kyle Petty	Petty Enterprises	Dodge
48	Jimmie Johnson	Hendrick Motorsports	Chevrolet
49	Ron Hornaday Jr.	BAM Racing	Dodge
55	Bobby Hamilton	Andy Petree Racing	Chevrolet
59	Randy Renfrow	Price Motorsports	Dodge
74	Chad Little	BACE Motorsports	Chevrolet
77	Dave Blaney	Jasper Motorsports	Ford
85	Carl Long	Mansion Motorsports	Ford
88	Dale Jarrett	Robert Yates Racing	Ford
90	Hermie Sadler	Donlavey Racing	Ford
97	Kurt Busch	Roush Racing	Ford
99	Jeff Burton	Roush Racing	Ford

== Qualifying ==
Pos.	#	Driver	Make	Team	Time	Avg. Speed (mph)
1	48	Jimmie Johnson	Chevrolet	Hendrick Motorsports	28.959	186.464
2	21	Elliott Sadler	Ford	Wood Brothers Racing	28.965	186.425
3	32	Ricky Craven	Ford	PPI Motorsports	28.999	186.213
4	12	Ryan Newman	Ford	Penske Racing South	29.013	186.117
5	9	Bill Elliott	Dodge	Evernham Motorsports	29.087	185.643
6	8	Dale Earnhardt, Jr.	Chevrolet	Dale Earnhardt, Inc.	29.124	185.414
7	10	Jerry Nadeau	Pontiac	MB2 Motorsports	29.152	185.235
8	99	Jeff Burton	Ford	Roush Racing	29.159	185.191
9	36	Ken Schrader	Pontiac	MB2 Motorsports	29.167	185.134
10	20	Tony Stewart	Pontiac	Joe Gibbs Racing	29.179	185.064
11	15	Michael Waltrip	Chevrolet	Dale Earnhardt, Inc.	29.183	185.039
12	31	Robby Gordon	Chevrolet	Richard Childress Racing	29.186	185.020
13	4	Mike Skinner	Chevrolet	Morgan–McClure Motorsports	29.187	185.007
14	77	Dave Blaney	Ford	Jasper Motorsports	29.211	184.861
15	14	Stacy Compton	Pontiac	A. J. Foyt Enterprises	29.226	184.761
16	24	Jeff Gordon	Chevrolet	Hendrick Motorsports	29.231	184.735
17	7	Casey Atwood	Dodge	Ultra Motorsports	29.236	184.703
18	25	Joe Nemechek	Chevrolet	Hendrick Motorsports	29.270	184.489
19	28	Ricky Rudd	Ford	Robert Yates Racing	29.284	184.394
20	1	Steve Park	Chevrolet	Dale Earnhardt, Inc.	29.295	184.331
21	17	Matt Kenseth	Ford	Roush Racing	29.347	184.005
22	38	Kevin Lepage	Ford	Quest Motor Racing	29.361	183.917
23	18	Bobby Labonte	Pontiac	Joe Gibbs Racing	29.368	183.867
24	97	Kurt Busch	Ford	Roush Racing	29.375	183.829
25	6	Mark Martin	Ford	Roush Racing	29.388	183.748
26	29	Kevin Harvick	Chevrolet	Richard Childress Racing	29.403	183.648
27	19	Jeremy Mayfield	Dodge	Evernham Motorsports	29.405	183.642
28	43	John Andretti	Dodge	Petty Enterprises	29.406	183.636
29	55	Bobby Hamilton	Chevrolet	Andy Petree Racing	29.416	183.573
30	41	Jimmy Spencer	Dodge	Chip Ganassi Racing	29.427	183.498
31	2	Rusty Wallace	Ford	Penske Racing South	29.457	183.318
32	45	Kyle Petty	Dodge	Petty Enterprises	29.479	183.181
33	26	Frank Kimmel	Ford	Haas-Carter Motorsports	29.490	183.106
34	5	Terry Labonte	Chevrolet	Hendrick Motorsports	29.510	182.988
35	40	Sterling Marlin	Dodge	Chip Ganassi Racing	29.525	182.889
36	23	Hut Stricklin	Dodge	Bill Davis Racing	29.577	182.568
Provisionals
37	22	Ward Burton	Dodge	Bill Davis Racing	29.579	182.561
38	88	Dale Jarrett	Ford	Robert Yates Racing	29.673	181.983
39	30	Jeff Green	Chevrolet	Richard Childress Racing	29.648	181.137
40	44	Steve Grissom	Dodge	Petty Enterprises	29.697	181.836
41	11	Brett Bodine	Ford	Brett Bodine Racing	29.795	181.232
42	90	Hermie Sadler	Ford	Donlavey Racing	29.606	181.395
43	49	Ron Hornaday, Jr.	Dodge	BAM Racing	29.687	181.891
Failed to qualify or withdrew
44	85	Carl Long	Dodge	Mansion Motorsports	29.718	181.708
45	74	Chad Little	Chevrolet	BACE Motorsports	29.663	182.044
46	37	Derrike Cope	Ford	Quest Motor Racing	30.191	178.855
47	59	Randy Renfrow	Dodge	Price Motorsports	30.434	177.427
WD	02	Hermie Sadler	Chevrolet	SCORE Motorsports	0.000	0.000
WD	27	Kirk Shelmerdine	Ford	Kirk Shelmerdine Racing	0.000	0.000
WD	60	Jack Sprague	Chevrolet	Haas CNC Racing	0.000	0.000

== Race results ==
Fin	#	Driver	Make	Team	Laps	Led	Status	Pts	Winnings
1	6	Mark Martin	Ford	Roush Racing	400	44	running	180	$280,033
2	17	Matt Kenseth	Ford	Roush Racing	400	21	running	175	$170,600
3	32	Ricky Craven	Ford	PPI Motorsports	400	4	running	170	$139,250
4	28	Ricky Rudd	Ford	Robert Yates Racing	400	49	running	165	$158,617
5	24	Jeff Gordon	Chevrolet	Hendrick Motorsports	400	0	running	155	$144,928
6	20	Tony Stewart	Pontiac	Joe Gibbs Racing	400	0	running	150	$126,028
7	48	Jimmie Johnson	Chevrolet	Hendrick Motorsports	400	263	running	156	$150,925
8	15	Michael Waltrip	Chevrolet	Dale Earnhardt, Inc.	400	0	running	142	$82,775
9	9	Bill Elliott	Dodge	Evernham Motorsports	400	0	running	138	$100,981
10	2	Rusty Wallace	Ford	Penske Racing South	400	0	running	134	$113,125
11	40	Sterling Marlin	Dodge	Chip Ganassi Racing	400	0	running	130	$114,292
12	5	Terry Labonte	Chevrolet	Hendrick Motorsports	399	0	running	127	$98,458
13	45	Kyle Petty	Dodge	Petty Enterprises	399	0	running	124	$68,675
14	18	Bobby Labonte	Pontiac	Joe Gibbs Racing	399	2	running	126	$109,653
15	43	John Andretti	Dodge	Petty Enterprises	399	0	running	118	$96,008
16	31	Robby Gordon	Chevrolet	Richard Childress Racing	399	0	running	115	$93,331
17	7	Casey Atwood	Dodge	Ultra Motorsports	398	0	running	112	$82,475
18	36	Ken Schrader	Pontiac	MB2 Motorsports	398	0	running	109	$88,080
19	88	Dale Jarrett	Ford	Robert Yates Racing	398	0	running	106	$93,300
20	30	Jeff Green	Chevrolet	Richard Childress Racing	398	0	running	103	$65,875
21	77	Dave Blaney	Ford	Jasper Motorsports	398	2	running	105	$81,500
22	23	Hut Stricklin	Dodge	Bill Davis Racing	398	0	running	97	$62,625
23	55	Bobby Hamilton	Chevrolet	Andy Petree Racing	398	0	running	94	$77,989
24	4	Mike Skinner	Chevrolet	Morgan–McClure Motorsports	397	0	running	91	$61,100
25	41	Jimmy Spencer	Dodge	Chip Ganassi Racing	396	0	running	88	$61,100
26	26	Frank Kimmel	Ford	Haas-Carter Motorsports	396	6	running	90	$86,787
27	11	Brett Bodine	Ford	Brett Bodine Racing	396	0	running	82	$59,775
28	10	Jerry Nadeau	Pontiac	MB2 Motorsports	396	0	running	79	$84,500
29	90	Hermie Sadler	Ford	Donlavey Racing	396	0	running	76	$57,025
30	25	Joe Nemechek	Chevrolet	Hendrick Motorsports	395	0	running	73	$65,400
31	97	Kurt Busch	Ford	Roush Racing	395	2	running	75	$65,775
32	44	Steve Grissom	Dodge	Petty Enterprises	393	0	running	67	$56,650
33	21	Elliott Sadler	Ford	Wood Brothers Racing	386	2	running	69	$69,925
34	29	Kevin Harvick	Chevrolet	Richard Childress Racing	380	0	running	61	$102,178
35	8	Dale Earnhardt, Jr.	Chevrolet	Dale Earnhardt, Inc.	371	5	engine	63	$76,575
36	49	Ron Hornaday, Jr.	Dodge	BAM Racing	350	0	engine	55	$56,150
37	14	Stacy Compton	Pontiac	A. J. Foyt Enterprises	347	0	rear end	52	$56,045
38	1	Steve Park	Chevrolet	Dale Earnhardt, Inc.	336	0	running	49	$85,810
39	19	Jeremy Mayfield	Dodge	Evernham Motorsports	226	0	crash	46	$63,835
40	99	Jeff Burton	Ford	Roush Racing	225	0	engine	43	$100,892
41	12	Ryan Newman	Ford	Penske Racing South	100	0	engine	40	$66,115
42	22	Ward Burton	Dodge	Bill Davis Racing	79	0	crash	37	$98,510
43	38	Kevin Lepage	Ford	Quest Motor Racing	54	0	engine	34	$55,664

=== Race statistics ===
- Time of race: 4:21:23
- Average Speed: 137.729 miles per hour (221.653 km/h)
- Pole Speed: 186.464 miles per hour (300.085 km/h)
- Cautions: 9 for 48 laps
- Margin of Victory: 0.468 sec
- Lead changes: 21 among 11 drivers
- Percent of race run under caution: 12%
- Average green flag run: 35.2 laps

Previous race: 2002 Pontiac Excitement 400	Winston Cup Series; 2002 season	Next race: 2002 MBNA Platinum 400
