= 2002 MBNA Platinum 400 =

Auto race held at Dover International Speedway in 2002

Race details
- Race 13 of 36 in the 2002 NASCAR Winston Cup Series season
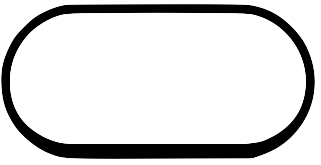
- Layout of Dover International Speedway
- Date: June 2, 2002
- Official name: MBNA Platinum 400
- Location: Dover International Speedway, Dover, Delaware
- Course: Permanent racing facility
- Course length: 1.000 miles (1.609 km)
- Distance: 400 laps, 400.0 mi (804.6 km)
- Weather: Very hot with temperatures of 86 °F (30 °C); wind speeds of 19 miles per hour (31 km/h)
- Average speed: 117.551 miles per hour (189.180 km/h)

Pole position
Driver	Matt Kenseth	Roush Racing

Most laps led
Driver	Jimmie Johnson	Hendrick Motorsports
- Laps: 188

Winner
No. 48	Jimmie Johnson	Hendrick Motorsports

Television in the United States
- Network: FX
- Announcers: Mike Joy; Darrell Waltrip; Larry McReynolds

The 2002 MBNA Platinum 400 was a NASCAR Winston Cup Series racing event that was held on June 2, 2002, at Dover International Speedway in Dover, Delaware.

Tony Raines would start his NASCAR Cup Series career during this event while Dick Trickle and Chad Little would end theirs after this race.

== Race report ==
Derrike Cope, Hermie Sadler, and Randy Renfrow failed to qualify for this race. Joe Nemechek was credited as the last-place finisher due to a crash on lap 42. This racing event lasted for 400 laps and Jimmie Johnson defeated Bill Elliott by almost half a second. Matt Kenseth would clinch his first ever pole position start by driving up to 154.939 miles per hour (249.350 km/h) during his solo qualifying run.

The race itself would last approximately three hours and twenty-four minutes; the green flag was officially waved at 1:00 PM EDT while the checkered flag came at approximately 4:24 PM EDT. Jimmie Johnson's average speed during his winning run was 117.551 mph (189.180 km/h). Any yellow flags in this race were caused by accidents, debris, and an oil spill on lap 373. About 40 laps of this race were done under caution with each green flag session lasting an average of 45 laps. Ricky Rudd, Bill Elliott, John Andretti, and Mark Martin would jointly lead the first 100 laps while the last 100 laps saw the first-place position of the race split between Ricky Rudd and eventual race winner Jimmie Johnson. Sterling Marlin kept his championship lead after this racing event. Only time in Cup when BACE Motorsports fielded two Cup entries. Pretty gutsy move considering their financial situation.

Winnings for this racing event varied from $56,712 ($101,515 when adjusted for inflation) to $152,400 ($272,797 adjusted for inflation).

The overall racing purse for this event added up to $3,450,082 ($6,175,679 when adjusted for inflation).

=== Qualifying ===
Grid	No.	Driver	Manufacturer
1	17	Matt Kenseth	Ford
2	9	Bill Elliott	Dodge
3	10	Jerry Nadeau	Pontiac
4	15	Michael Waltrip	Chevrolet
5	97	Kurt Busch	Ford
6	32	Ricky Craven	Ford
7	28	Ricky Rudd	Ford
8	21	Elliott Sadler	Ford
9	24	Jeff Gordon	Chevrolet
10	48	Jimmie Johnson	Chevrolet
11	45	Kyle Petty	Dodge
12	31	Robby Gordon	Chevrolet
13	6	Mark Martin	Ford
14	22	Ward Burton	Dodge
15	36	Ken Schrader	Pontiac
16	18	Bobby Labonte	Pontiac
17	73	Tony Raines	Chevrolet
18	41	Jimmy Spencer	Dodge
19	55	Bobby Hamilton	Chevrolet
20	4	Mike Spencer	Chevrolet
21	2	Rusty Wallace	Ford
22	1	Steve Park	Chevrolet
23	7	Casey Atwood	Dodge
24	19	Jeremy Mayfield	Dodge
25	20	Tony Stewart	Pontiac

== Top 10 finishers ==
Pos	Grid	No.	Driver	Manufacturer	Laps	Laps led	Time/Status
1	10	48	Jimmie Johnson	Chevrolet	400	188	3:24:10
2	2	9	Bill Elliott	Dodge	400	17	+0.478 seconds
3	33	99	Jeff Burton	Ford	400	0	Lead lap under green flag
4	38	12	Ryan Newman	Ford	400	0	Lead lap under green flag
5	31	88	Dale Jarrett	Ford	400	15	Lead lap under green flag
6	9	24	Jeff Gordon	Chevrolet	400	17	Lead lap under green flag
7	6	32	Ricky Craven	Ford	400	1	Lead lap under green flag
8	12	31	Robby Gordon	Chevrolet	400	0	Lead lap under green flag
9	19	55	Bobby Hamilton	Chevrolet	400	0	Lead lap under green flag
10	8	21	Elliott Sadler	Ford	400	0	Lead lap under green flag

== Timeline ==
Section reference:

- Start of race: Matt Kenseth started the race with the pole position but quickly lost it to Ricky Rudd.
- Lap 19: Caution due to debris; green flag racing on lap 22.
- Lap 42: Joe Nemechek had a terminal crash; forcing him to become the last-place finisher.
- Lap 44: Caution due to Joe Nemechek and Todd Bodine's accident; green flag racing on lap 50.
- Lap 48: Mark Martin took over the lead from Ricky Rudd before being overtaken by Jimmie Johnson on lap 125.
- Lap 126: Caution due to a 3-car accident; green flag racing on lap 136.
- Lap 144: Jimmie Johnson took over the lead from Jeff Gordon before being overtaken by Ricky Craven on lap 217.
- Lap 170: A fuel pump issue forced Dick Trickle out of the race for the day.
- Lap 216: Caution due to Matt Kenseth's accident; green flag racing resumed on lap 220.
- Lap 218: Jimmie Johnson took over the lead from Ricky Craven before being overtaken by Dale Jarrett on lap 293.
- Lap 283: Mark Martin had a terminal crash; ending his day on the track.
- Lap 292: Caution due to Jeff Green's accident; green flag racing resumed on lap 297.
- Lap 307: Caution due to debris; green flag racing on lap 311.
- Lap 308: Ricky Rudd took over the lead from Dale Jarrett before being overtaken by Jimmie Johnson on lap 363.
- Lap 370: Ken Schrader had a terminal crash; bringing his NASCAR race weekend to an early end.
- Lap 373: Caution due to oil on track; green flag racing on lap 378.
- Finish: Jimmie Johnson was officially declared the winner of the event.

== Standings after the race ==
Pos	Driver	Points	Differential
1	Sterling Marlin	1899	0
2	Matt Kenseth	1763	-136
3 ▲	Jeff Gordon	1739	-160
4 ▼	Matt Kenseth	1731	-168
5 ▲	Rusty Wallace	1688	-211
6 ▼	Mark Martin	1677	-222
7	Tony Stewart	1674	-225
8	Kurt Busch	1656	-243
9 ▲	Bill Elliott	1612	-287
10 ▼	Ricky Rudd	1606	-293

Preceded by 2002 Coca-Cola Racing Family 600	NASCAR Winston Cup Series Season; 2002	Succeeded by 2002 Pocono 500
