= NASCAR Cup Series at Las Vegas Motor Speedway =

Annual NASCAR Cup Series races at Las Vegas Motor Speedway

NASCAR Cup Series
- Venue: Las Vegas Motor Speedway
- Location: Las Vegas, Nevada, United States

Circuit information
- Surface: Asphalt
- Length: 1.5 mi (2.4 km)
- Turns: 4

Stock car races in the NASCAR Cup Series have been held at Las Vegas Motor Speedway in Las Vegas, Nevada since 1998.

== Spring race ==
Pennzoil 400
- Corporate sponsor: Pennzoil and Jiffy Lube
- First race: 1998
- Distance: 400.5 mi (644.542 km)
- Laps: 267; Stages 1/2: 80 each Final stage: 107
- Previous names: Las Vegas 400 (1998–1999); CarsDirect.com 400 (2000); UAW-DaimlerChrysler 400 (2001–2007); UAW-Dodge 400 (2008); Shelby 427 (2009); Shelby American (2010); Kobalt Tools 400 (2011–2013); Kobalt 400 (2014–2017)
- Most wins (driver): Jimmie Johnson (4)
- Most wins (team): Hendrick Motorsports (9)
- Most wins (manufacturer): Ford (13)

The Pennzoil 400 presented by Jiffy Lube is the current name of the spring race. Denny Hamlin is the defending race winner.

=== History ===
For several years, the race was sponsored by United Auto Workers and DaimlerChrysler. From its inception, the race was run at a distance of 400 miles (640 km) except 2009, which was 427 miles. The extra 27 miles in the 2009 race were added by the sponsors Carroll Shelby International.

The race is unique in that its winner receives a championship belt rather than a trophy. The race was also part of the No Bull 5 challenge from 1999 to 2002.

From 2001 until 2008, this race carried sponsorship from Chrysler. For the first six of those years, the race was known as the UAW-DaimlerChrysler 400 to reflect the company formed by Chrysler's 1998 merger with Daimler-Benz. After Daimler sold Chrysler to Cerberus Capital Management, the race became known as the UAW-Dodge 400 for the 2008 race. Carroll Shelby International took over as a sponsor for 2009 and 2010, with the 2009 race adding 27 miles (43 km) as part of the sponsorship in honor of the Shelby 427 Cobra; the 2010 race was known as the Shelby American. Lowe's, through its Kobalt Tools subsidiary, became the race's title sponsor for 2011; Kobalt was the title sponsor for the spring race at Atlanta until the track gave up its early-season date after 2010. The race was called the Kobalt Tools 400 from 2011 to 2013 before becoming the Kobalt 400 for 2014 to 2017. For the 2018 season, the race became the Pennzoil 400.

=== Past winners ===
Year	Date	No.	Driver	Team	Manufacturer	Race distance		Race time	Average speed (mph)	Report	Ref
Year	Date	No.	Driver	Team	Manufacturer	Laps	Miles (km)	Race time	Average speed (mph)	Report	Ref
1998	March 1	6	Mark Martin	Roush Racing	Ford	267	400.5 (644.542)	2:43:58	146.554	Report	
1999	March 7	99	Jeff Burton	Roush Racing	Ford	267	400.5 (644.542)	2:54:43	137.537	Report	
2000	March 5	99	Jeff Burton	Roush Racing	Ford	148*	222 (357.274)	1:51:01	119.982	Report	
2001	March 4	24	Jeff Gordon	Hendrick Motorsports	Chevrolet	267	400.5 (644.542)	2:57:17	135.546	Report	
2002	March 3	40	Sterling Marlin	Chip Ganassi Racing	Dodge	267	400.5 (644.542)	2:55:43	136.754	Report	
2003	March 2	17	Matt Kenseth	Roush Racing	Ford	267	400.5 (644.542)	3:00:46	132.934	Report	
2004	March 7	17	Matt Kenseth	Roush Racing	Ford	267	400.5 (644.542)	3:06:35	128.79	Report	
2005	March 13	48	Jimmie Johnson	Hendrick Motorsports	Chevrolet	267	400.5 (644.542)	3:18:32	121.038	Report	
2006	March 12	48	Jimmie Johnson	Hendrick Motorsports	Chevrolet	270*	405 (651.784)	3:02:13	133.358	Report	
2007	March 11	48	Jimmie Johnson	Hendrick Motorsports	Chevrolet	267	400.5 (644.542)	3:07:28	128.183	Report	
2008	March 2	99	Carl Edwards	Roush Fenway Racing	Ford	267	400.5 (644.542)	3:08:08	127.729	Report	
2009	March 1	18	Kyle Busch	Joe Gibbs Racing	Toyota	285	427.5 (687.994)	3:34:37	119.515	Report	
2010	February 28	48	Jimmie Johnson	Hendrick Motorsports	Chevrolet	267	400.5 (644.542)	2:49:53	141.450	Report	
2011	March 6	99	Carl Edwards	Roush Fenway Racing	Ford	267	400.5 (644.542)	2:57:20	135.508	Report	
2012	March 11	14	Tony Stewart	Stewart–Haas Racing	Chevrolet	267	400.5 (644.542)	2:54:44	137.524	Report	
2013	March 10	20	Matt Kenseth*	Joe Gibbs Racing	Toyota	267	400.5 (644.542)	2:44:16	146.287	Report	
2014	March 9	2	Brad Keselowski	Team Penske	Ford	267	400.5 (644.542)	2:35:24	154.633	Report	
2015	March 8	4	Kevin Harvick	Stewart–Haas Racing	Chevrolet	267	400.5 (644.542)	2:47:15	143.677	Report	
2016	March 6	2	Brad Keselowski	Team Penske	Ford	267	400.5 (644.542)	2:53:55	138.170	Report	
2017	March 12	78	Martin Truex Jr.	Furniture Row Racing	Toyota	267	400.5 (644.542)	2:56:39	136.032	Report	
2018	March 4	4	Kevin Harvick	Stewart–Haas Racing	Ford	267	400.5 (644.542)	2:49:31	141.756	Report	
2019	March 3	22	Joey Logano	Team Penske	Ford	267	400.5 (644.542)	2:35:11	154.849	Report	
2020	February 23	22	Joey Logano	Team Penske	Ford	267	400.5 (644.542)	2:58:11	134.861	Report	
2021	March 7	5	Kyle Larson	Hendrick Motorsports	Chevrolet	267	400.5 (644.542)	2:52:07	139.615	Report	
2022	March 6	48	Alex Bowman	Hendrick Motorsports	Chevrolet	274*	411 (661.44)	3:29:50	117.552	Report	
2023	March 5	24	William Byron	Hendrick Motorsports	Chevrolet	271*	406.5 (654.198)	2:50:35	142.98	Report	
2024	March 3	5	Kyle Larson	Hendrick Motorsports	Chevrolet	267	400.5 (644.542)	3:00:25	133.192	Report	
2025	March 16	21	Josh Berry	Wood Brothers Racing	Ford	267	400.5 (654.198)	3:13:13	124.368	Report	
2026	March 15	11	Denny Hamlin	Joe Gibbs Racing	Toyota	267	400.5 (654.198)	2:41:17	148.992	Report	
2027	March 21									Report	

==== Notes ====
- 2000: Race shortened due to rain.
- 2006, 2022, & 2023: Race extended due to NASCAR overtime.

==== Multiple winners (drivers) ====
# Wins	Driver	Years won
4	Jimmie Johnson	2005, 2006, 2007, 2010
3	Matt Kenseth	2003, 2004, 2013
2	Jeff Burton	1999, 2000
2	Carl Edwards	2008, 2011
2	Brad Keselowski	2014, 2016
2	Kevin Harvick	2015, 2018
2	Joey Logano	2019, 2020
2	Kyle Larson	2021, 2024

==== Multiple winners (teams) ====
# Wins	Team	Years won
9	Hendrick Motorsports	2001, 2005-2007, 2010, 2021-2024
7	RFK Racing	1998-2000, 2003, 2004, 2008, 2011
4	Team Penske	2014, 2016, 2019, 2020
3	Stewart–Haas Racing	2012, 2015, 2018
3	Joe Gibbs Racing	2009, 2013, 2026

==== Manufacturer wins ====
# Wins	Manufacturer	Years won
13	Ford	1998-2000, 2003, 2004, 2008, 2011, 2014, 2016, 2018-2020, 2025
11	Chevrolet	2001, 2005-2007, 2010, 2012, 2015, 2021-2024
4	Toyota	2009, 2013, 2017, 2026
1	Dodge	2002

== Fall race ==
South Point 400
- Corporate sponsor: South Point Hotel, Casino & Spa
- First race: 2018
- Distance: 400.5 miles (644.5 km)
- Laps: 267; Stages 1/2: 80 each Final stage: 107
- Most wins (driver): Joey Logano; Denny Hamlin (2)
- Most wins (team): Joe Gibbs Racing (4)
- Most wins (manufacturer): Toyota (4)

The South Point 400 is the current name for the fall race. Chase Briscoe is the defending race winner.

=== History ===
On March 8, 2017, it was announced that the fall race at New Hampshire Motor Speedway would move to Las Vegas Motor Speedway starting in 2018.

The fall race at Las Vegas would become the first race of the NASCAR Playoffs to replace Chicagoland Speedway, which moved back to July. The South Point Hotel, Casino & Spa, owned by semi-retired NASCAR driver Brendan Gaughan's father and LVMS partner Michael, became the title sponsor of the race.

In 2020, the race was held as the first race of the Round of 12 as part of a schedule realignment. In 2022, the race was moved to the first race of the Round of 8. In 2026, the race was moved to the fifth race of "The Chase".

=== Past winners ===
Year	Date	No.	Driver	Team	Manufacturer	Race distance		Race time	Average speed (mph)	Report	Ref
Year	Date	No.	Driver	Team	Manufacturer	Laps	Miles (km)	Race time	Average speed (mph)	Report	Ref
2018	September 16	2	Brad Keselowski	Team Penske	Ford	272*	408 (656.612)	3:28:15	111.849	Report	
2019*	September 15	19	Martin Truex Jr.	Joe Gibbs Racing	Toyota	267	400.5 (644.541)	2:48:34	142.555	Report	
2020	September 27	1	Kurt Busch	Chip Ganassi Racing	Chevrolet	268*	402 (646.955)	3:03:32	131.42	Report	
2021	September 26	11	Denny Hamlin	Joe Gibbs Racing	Toyota	267	400.5 (644.541)	2:46:08	144.643	Report	
2022	October 16	22	Joey Logano	Team Penske	Ford	267	400.5 (644.541)	3:04:10	130.480	Report	
2023	October 15	5	Kyle Larson	Hendrick Motorsports	Chevrolet	267	400.5 (644.541)	2:57:10	135.635	Report	
2024	October 20	22	Joey Logano	Team Penske	Ford	267	400.5 (644.541)	2:52:24	139.385	Report	
2025	October 12	11	Denny Hamlin	Joe Gibbs Racing	Toyota	267	400.5 (644.541)	2:55:14	137.131	Report	
2026	October 4	19	Chase Briscoe	Joe Gibbs Racing	Toyota	267	400.5 (644.541)	2:43:04	147.363	Report	
2027	October 10									Report	

==== Notes ====
- 2018 & 2020 Race extended due to a NASCAR Overtime finish.

==== Multiple winners (drivers) ====
# of wins	Team	Years won
2	Joey Logano	2022, 2024
2	Denny Hamlin	2021, 2025

==== Multiple winners (teams) ====
# of wins	Team	Years won
4	Joe Gibbs Racing	2019, 2021, 2025, 2026
3	Team Penske	2018, 2022, 2024

==== Manufacturer wins ====
# Wins	Manufacturer	Years won
4	Toyota	2019, 2021, 2025, 2026
3	Ford	2018, 2022, 2024
2	Chevrolet	2020, 2023

Previous race: Straight Talk Wireless 500	NASCAR Cup Series; Pennzoil 400	Next race: Goodyear 400

Previous race: Hollywood Casino 400	NASCAR Cup Series; South Point 400	Next race: Bank of America 400
