= 2001 Virginia 500 =

Eighth race of the 2001 NASCAR Winston Cup Series

Race details
- Race 8 of 36 in the 2001 NASCAR Winston Cup Series
- The 2001 Virginia 500 program cover.
- Date: April 8, 2001
- Official name: 52nd Annual Virginia 500
- Location: Ridgeway, Virginia, Martinsville Speedway
- Course: Permanent racing facility
- Course length: 0.526 miles (0.847 km)
- Distance: 500 laps, 263 mi (423.257 km)
- Scheduled distance: 500 laps, 263 mi (423.257 km)
- Average speed: 70.799 miles per hour (113.940 km/h)

Pole position
Driver	Jeff Gordon	Hendrick Motorsports
- Time: 20.126

Most laps led
Driver	Bobby Hamilton	Andy Petree Racing
- Laps: 130

Winner
No. 88	Dale Jarrett	Robert Yates Racing

Television in the United States
- Network: FOX
- Announcers: Mike Joy, Larry McReynolds, Darrell Waltrip

Radio in the United States
- Radio: Motor Racing Network

The 2001 Virginia 500 was the eighth stock car race of the 2001 NASCAR Winston Cup Series and the 52nd iteration of the event. The race was held on Sunday, April 8, 2001, Ridgeway, Virginia at Martinsville Speedway, a 0.526 miles (0.847 km) permanent oval-shaped short track. The race took the scheduled 500 laps to complete. Within the final laps of the race, Robert Yates Racing driver Dale Jarrett would manage to pass teammate Ricky Rudd to earn his 27th career NASCAR Winston Cup Series victory and his third victory of the season. To fill out the top three, Rudd and Roush Racing driver Jeff Burton would finish second and third, respectively.

== Background ==
The layout of Martinsville Speedway, the venue where the race was held.

Martinsville Speedway is a NASCAR-owned stock car racing track located in Ridgeway, Virginia. At 0.526 miles (0.847 km) in length, it is the shortest track in the NASCAR Winston Cup Series. The track was also one of the first paved oval tracks in NASCAR, being built in 1947 by H. Clay Earles. It is also the only remaining race track that has been on the NASCAR circuit from its beginning in 1948.

=== Entry list ===
- (R) denotes rookie driver.

#	Driver	Team	Make
1	Steve Park	Dale Earnhardt, Inc.	Chevrolet
01	Jason Leffler (R)	Chip Ganassi Racing with Felix Sabates	Dodge
2	Rusty Wallace	Penske Racing South	Ford
4	Kevin Lepage	Morgan–McClure Motorsports	Chevrolet
5	Terry Labonte	Hendrick Motorsports	Chevrolet
6	Mark Martin	Roush Racing	Ford
7	Mike Wallace	Ultra Motorsports	Ford
8	Dale Earnhardt Jr.	Dale Earnhardt, Inc.	Chevrolet
9	Bill Elliott	Evernham Motorsports	Dodge
10	Johnny Benson Jr.	MBV Motorsports	Pontiac
11	Brett Bodine	Brett Bodine Racing	Ford
12	Jeremy Mayfield	Penske Racing South	Ford
13	Hermie Sadler	SCORE Motorsports	Chevrolet
14	Ron Hornaday Jr. (R)	A. J. Foyt Enterprises	Pontiac
15	Michael Waltrip	Dale Earnhardt, Inc.	Chevrolet
17	Matt Kenseth	Roush Racing	Ford
18	Bobby Labonte	Joe Gibbs Racing	Pontiac
19	Casey Atwood (R)	Evernham Motorsports	Dodge
20	Tony Stewart	Joe Gibbs Racing	Pontiac
21	Elliott Sadler	Wood Brothers Racing	Ford
22	Ward Burton	Bill Davis Racing	Dodge
24	Jeff Gordon	Hendrick Motorsports	Chevrolet
25	Jerry Nadeau	Hendrick Motorsports	Chevrolet
26	Jimmy Spencer	Haas-Carter Motorsports	Ford
27	Kenny Wallace	Eel River Racing	Pontiac
28	Ricky Rudd	Robert Yates Racing	Ford
29	Kevin Harvick (R)	Richard Childress Racing	Chevrolet
31	Mike Skinner	Richard Childress Racing	Chevrolet
32	Ricky Craven	PPI Motorsports	Ford
33	Joe Nemechek	Andy Petree Racing	Chevrolet
36	Ken Schrader	MBV Motorsports	Pontiac
40	Sterling Marlin	Chip Ganassi Racing with Felix Sabates	Dodge
43	John Andretti	Petty Enterprises	Dodge
44	Buckshot Jones	Petty Enterprises	Dodge
45	Kyle Petty	Petty Enterprises	Dodge
50	Rick Mast	Midwest Transit Racing	Chevrolet
55	Bobby Hamilton	Andy Petree Racing	Chevrolet
66	Todd Bodine	Haas-Carter Motorsports	Ford
77	Robert Pressley	Jasper Motorsports	Ford
88	Dale Jarrett	Robert Yates Racing	Ford
90	Hut Stricklin	Donlavey Racing	Ford
92	Stacy Compton	Melling Racing	Dodge
93	Dave Blaney	Bill Davis Racing	Dodge
96	Andy Houston (R)	PPI Motorsports	Ford
97	Kurt Busch (R)	Roush Racing	Ford
99	Jeff Burton	Roush Racing	Ford

== Practice ==
=== First practice ===
The first practice session was held on Friday, April 6, at 11:15 AM EST. The session would last for one hour and 10 minutes. Robert Pressley, driving for Jasper Motorsports, would set the fastest time in the session, with a lap of 20.055 and an average speed of 94.420 mph (151.954 km/h).

Pos.	#	Driver	Team	Make	Time	Speed
1	77	Robert Pressley	Jasper Motorsports	Ford	20.055	94.420
2	25	Jerry Nadeau	Hendrick Motorsports	Chevrolet	20.108	94.171
3	33	Joe Nemechek	Andy Petree Racing	Chevrolet	20.119	94.120
Full first practice results

=== Final practice ===
The final practice session was held on Saturday, April 7, at 11:30 EST. The session would last for one hour and 30 minutes. Jerry Nadeau, driving for Hendrick Motorsports, would set the fastest time in the session, with a lap of 20.440 and an average speed of 92.642 mph (149.093 km/h).

Pos.	#	Driver	Team	Make	Time	Speed
1	25	Jerry Nadeau	Hendrick Motorsports	Chevrolet	20.440	92.642
2	20	Tony Stewart	Joe Gibbs Racing	Pontiac	20.468	92.515
3	26	Jimmy Spencer	Haas-Carter Motorsports	Ford	20.469	92.511
Full final practice results

== Qualifying ==
Qualifying was held on Friday, April 6, at 3:00 PM EST. Each driver would have two laps to set a fastest time; the fastest of the two would count as their official qualifying lap. Positions 1-36 would be decided on time, while positions 37-43 would be based on provisionals. Six spots are awarded by the use of provisionals based on owner's points. The seventh is awarded to a past champion who has not otherwise qualified for the race. If no past champ needs the provisional, the next team in the owner points will be awarded a provisional.

Jeff Gordon, driving for Hendrick Motorsports, would win the pole, setting a time of 20.126 and an average speed of 94.087 mph (151.418 km/h).

Three drivers would fail to qualify: Jason Leffler, Hermie Sadler, and Hut Stricklin.

=== Full qualifying results ===
Pos.	#	Driver	Team	Make	Time	Speed
1	24	Jeff Gordon	Hendrick Motorsports	Chevrolet	20.126	94.087
2	2	Rusty Wallace	Penske Racing South	Ford	20.146	93.994
3	99	Jeff Burton	Roush Racing	Ford	20.149	93.980
4	28	Ricky Rudd	Robert Yates Racing	Ford	20.166	93.901
5	77	Robert Pressley	Jasper Motorsports	Ford	20.167	93.896
6	12	Jeremy Mayfield	Penske Racing South	Ford	20.187	93.803
7	25	Jerry Nadeau	Hendrick Motorsports	Chevrolet	20.190	93.789
8	33	Joe Nemechek	Andy Petree Racing	Chevrolet	20.195	93.766
9	55	Bobby Hamilton	Andy Petree Racing	Chevrolet	20.197	93.756
10	8	Dale Earnhardt Jr.	Dale Earnhardt, Inc.	Chevrolet	20.206	93.715
11	50	Rick Mast	Midwest Transit Racing	Chevrolet	20.209	93.701
12	66	Todd Bodine	Haas-Carter Motorsports	Ford	20.236	93.576
13	88	Dale Jarrett	Robert Yates Racing	Ford	20.238	93.567
14	19	Casey Atwood (R)	Evernham Motorsports	Dodge	20.239	93.562
15	29	Kevin Harvick (R)	Richard Childress Racing	Chevrolet	20.249	93.516
16	20	Tony Stewart	Joe Gibbs Racing	Pontiac	20.253	93.497
17	9	Bill Elliott	Evernham Motorsports	Dodge	20.261	93.460
18	32	Ricky Craven	PPI Motorsports	Ford	20.270	93.419
19	31	Mike Skinner	Richard Childress Racing	Chevrolet	20.275	93.396
20	7	Mike Wallace	Ultra Motorsports	Ford	20.275	93.396
21	26	Jimmy Spencer	Haas-Carter Motorsports	Ford	20.288	93.336
22	92	Stacy Compton	Melling Racing	Dodge	20.288	93.336
23	11	Brett Bodine	Brett Bodine Racing	Ford	20.293	93.313
24	18	Bobby Labonte	Joe Gibbs Racing	Pontiac	20.296	93.299
25	17	Matt Kenseth	Roush Racing	Ford	20.300	93.281
26	10	Johnny Benson Jr.	MBV Motorsports	Pontiac	20.326	93.161
27	44	Buckshot Jones	Petty Enterprises	Dodge	20.329	93.148
28	27	Kenny Wallace	Eel River Racing	Pontiac	20.334	93.125
29	1	Steve Park	Dale Earnhardt, Inc.	Chevrolet	20.357	93.020
30	96	Andy Houston (R)	PPI Motorsports	Ford	20.363	92.992
31	40	Sterling Marlin	Chip Ganassi Racing with Felix Sabates	Dodge	20.370	92.960
32	36	Ken Schrader	MB2 Motorsports	Pontiac	20.370	92.960
33	45	Kyle Petty	Petty Enterprises	Dodge	20.371	92.956
34	93	Dave Blaney	Bill Davis Racing	Dodge	20.399	92.828
35	15	Michael Waltrip	Dale Earnhardt, Inc.	Chevrolet	20.407	92.792
36	6	Mark Martin	Roush Racing	Ford	20.440	92.642
Provisionals
37	21	Elliott Sadler	Wood Brothers Racing	Ford	20.504	92.353
38	22	Ward Burton	Bill Davis Racing	Dodge	20.449	92.601
39	5	Terry Labonte	Hendrick Motorsports	Chevrolet	20.503	92.357
40	43	John Andretti	Petty Enterprises	Dodge	20.461	92.547
41	97	Kurt Busch (R)	Roush Racing	Ford	20.522	92.272
42	4	Kevin Lepage	Morgan–McClure Motorsports	Chevrolet	20.546	92.164
43	14	Ron Hornaday Jr. (R)	A. J. Foyt Enterprises	Pontiac	20.477	92.474
Failed to qualify
44	01	Jason Leffler (R)	Chip Ganassi Racing with Felix Sabates	Dodge	20.497	92.384
45	13	Hermie Sadler	SCORE Motorsports	Chevrolet	20.511	92.321
46	90	Hut Stricklin	Donlavey Racing	Ford	20.525	92.258
Official qualifying results

== Race results ==
Fin	St	#	Driver	Team	Make	Laps	Led	Status	Pts	Winnings
1	13	88	Dale Jarrett	Robert Yates Racing	Ford	500	6	running	180	$170,027
2	4	28	Ricky Rudd	Robert Yates Racing	Ford	500	50	running	175	$106,047
3	3	99	Jeff Burton	Roush Racing	Ford	500	128	running	170	$108,596
4	9	55	Bobby Hamilton	Andy Petree Racing	Chevrolet	500	130	running	170	$77,675
5	31	40	Sterling Marlin	Chip Ganassi Racing with Felix Sabates	Dodge	500	20	running	160	$67,110
6	25	17	Matt Kenseth	Roush Racing	Ford	500	11	running	155	$57,750
7	16	20	Tony Stewart	Joe Gibbs Racing	Pontiac	500	0	running	146	$59,200
8	24	18	Bobby Labonte	Joe Gibbs Racing	Pontiac	500	0	running	142	$90,402
9	21	26	Jimmy Spencer	Haas-Carter Motorsports	Ford	500	0	running	138	$57,695
10	7	25	Jerry Nadeau	Hendrick Motorsports	Chevrolet	500	0	running	134	$55,625
11	10	8	Dale Earnhardt Jr.	Dale Earnhardt, Inc.	Chevrolet	500	0	running	130	$71,233
12	1	24	Jeff Gordon	Hendrick Motorsports	Chevrolet	500	6	running	132	$87,427
13	2	2	Rusty Wallace	Penske Racing South	Ford	500	58	running	129	$82,415
14	17	9	Bill Elliott	Evernham Motorsports	Dodge	500	0	running	121	$63,898
15	22	92	Stacy Compton	Melling Racing	Dodge	500	0	running	118	$47,586
16	8	33	Joe Nemechek	Andy Petree Racing	Chevrolet	500	0	running	115	$67,245
17	30	96	Andy Houston (R)	PPI Motorsports	Ford	500	0	running	112	$35,475
18	42	4	Kevin Lepage	Morgan–McClure Motorsports	Chevrolet	499	0	running	109	$42,140
19	29	1	Steve Park	Dale Earnhardt, Inc.	Chevrolet	499	0	running	106	$63,493
20	26	10	Johnny Benson Jr.	MBV Motorsports	Pontiac	499	0	running	103	$49,350
21	37	21	Elliott Sadler	Wood Brothers Racing	Ford	499	0	running	100	$57,725
22	38	22	Ward Burton	Bill Davis Racing	Dodge	499	0	running	97	$69,485
23	39	5	Terry Labonte	Hendrick Motorsports	Chevrolet	499	0	running	94	$68,780
24	35	15	Michael Waltrip	Dale Earnhardt, Inc.	Chevrolet	497	0	running	91	$42,650
25	32	36	Ken Schrader	MB2 Motorsports	Pontiac	497	0	running	88	$44,450
26	14	19	Casey Atwood (R)	Evernham Motorsports	Dodge	496	0	running	85	$32,200
27	43	14	Ron Hornaday Jr. (R)	A. J. Foyt Enterprises	Pontiac	495	24	running	87	$35,000
28	18	32	Ricky Craven	PPI Motorsports	Ford	494	25	running	84	$31,800
29	34	93	Dave Blaney	Bill Davis Racing	Dodge	494	0	running	76	$34,600
30	6	12	Jeremy Mayfield	Penske Racing South	Ford	490	0	running	73	$73,184
31	20	7	Mike Wallace	Ultra Motorsports	Ford	489	0	running	70	$39,200
32	19	31	Mike Skinner	Richard Childress Racing	Chevrolet	488	0	running	67	$63,824
33	41	97	Kurt Busch (R)	Roush Racing	Ford	466	0	running	64	$38,800
34	15	29	Kevin Harvick (R)	Richard Childress Racing	Chevrolet	454	0	running	61	$76,627
35	40	43	John Andretti	Petty Enterprises	Dodge	451	0	running	58	$65,502
36	23	11	Brett Bodine	Brett Bodine Racing	Ford	432	0	running	55	$30,400
37	28	27	Kenny Wallace	Eel River Racing	Pontiac	370	0	running	52	$30,275
38	27	44	Buckshot Jones	Petty Enterprises	Dodge	350	0	running	49	$38,150
39	36	6	Mark Martin	Roush Racing	Ford	268	42	accident	51	$74,376
40	5	77	Robert Pressley	Jasper Motorsports	Ford	250	0	overheating	43	$38,175
41	11	50	Rick Mast	Midwest Transit Racing	Chevrolet	232	0	rear end	40	$29,850
42	33	45	Kyle Petty	Petty Enterprises	Dodge	155	0	overheating	37	$29,625
43	12	66	Todd Bodine	Haas-Carter Motorsports	Ford	12	0	engine	34	$29,756
Official race results

== Standings after the race ==
	Pos	Driver	Points
	1	Dale Jarrett	1,236
	2	Jeff Gordon	1,113 (–123)
	3	Johnny Benson Jr.	1,049 (–187)
1	4	Sterling Marlin	1,049 (–187)
1	5	Steve Park	1,039 (–197)
	6	Rusty Wallace	1,008 (–228)
	7	Bobby Hamilton	995 (–241)
3	8	Ricky Rudd	970 (–266)
	9	Bill Elliott	943 (–293)
2	10	Elliott Sadler	924 (–312)

Previous race: 2001 Harrah's 500 (NASCAR)	NASCAR Winston Cup Series; 2001 season	Next race: 2001 Talladega 500
