= 2001 Harrah's 500 (NASCAR) =

Seventh race of the 2001 NASCAR Winston Cup Series

Race details
- Race 7 of 36 in the 2001 NASCAR Winston Cup Series
- The 2001 Harrah's 500 program cover, with artwork from Sam Bass. The cover celebrates Dale Earnhardt Jr.'s first ever win at the 2000 DirecTV 500. The painting is called "A Texas Sized Win!"
- Date: April 1, 2001
- Official name: 5th Annual Harrah's 500
- Location: Fort Worth, Texas, Texas Motor Speedway
- Course: Permanent racing facility
- Course length: 1.5 miles (2.41 km)
- Distance: 334 laps, 501 mi (806.281 km)
- Scheduled distance: 334 laps, 501 mi (806.281 km)
- Average speed: 141.804 miles per hour (228.211 km/h)
- Attendance: 211,000

Pole position
Driver	Dale Earnhardt Jr.	Dale Earnhardt, Inc.
- Time: 28.320

Most laps led
Driver	Dale Jarrett	Robert Yates Racing
- Laps: 122

Winner
No. 88	Dale Jarrett	Robert Yates Racing

Television in the United States
- Network: FOX
- Announcers: Mike Joy, Larry McReynolds, Darrell Waltrip

Radio in the United States
- Radio: Performance Racing Network
- Booth announcers: Doug Rice, Mark Garrow
- Turn announcers: Chuck Carland, Rob Albright

The 2001 Harrah's 500 was the seventh stock car race of the 2001 NASCAR Winston Cup Series and the fifth iteration of the event. The race was held on Sunday, April 1, 2001, in Fort Worth, Texas at Texas Motor Speedway, a 1.5 miles (2.4 km) permanent tri-oval shaped racetrack. The race took the scheduled 334 laps to complete. A call for four tires for Robert Yates Racing driver Dale Jarrett would prove to be instrumental as he would slice his way through the field on the final restart with 18 to go to win the race. The win was Jarrett's 27th career NASCAR Winston Cup Series victory and his second of the season. To fill out the podium, Steve Park, driving for Dale Earnhardt, Inc., and Johnny Benson Jr., driving for MBV Motorsports, would finish second and third, respectively.

== Background ==
The layout of Texas Motor Speedway, the venue where the race was held.

Texas Motor Speedway is a speedway located in Fort Worth, Texas. The track measures 1.5 miles (2.4 km) around and is banked 24 degrees in the turns, and is of the oval design, where the front straightaway juts outward slightly. The track layout is similar to Charlotte Motor Speedway. The track is owned by Speedway Motorsports.

=== Entry list ===
- (R) denotes rookie driver.

#	Driver	Team	Make
1	Steve Park	Dale Earnhardt, Inc.	Chevrolet
01	Jason Leffler (R)	Chip Ganassi Racing with Felix Sabates	Dodge
2	Rusty Wallace	Penske Racing South	Ford
4	Kevin Lepage	Morgan–McClure Motorsports	Chevrolet
5	Terry Labonte	Hendrick Motorsports	Chevrolet
6	Mark Martin	Roush Racing	Ford
7	Mike Wallace	Ultra Motorsports	Ford
8	Dale Earnhardt Jr.	Dale Earnhardt, Inc.	Chevrolet
9	Bill Elliott	Evernham Motorsports	Dodge
10	Johnny Benson Jr.	MBV Motorsports	Pontiac
11	Brett Bodine	Brett Bodine Racing	Ford
12	Jeremy Mayfield	Penske Racing South	Ford
14	Ron Hornaday Jr. (R)	A. J. Foyt Enterprises	Pontiac
15	Michael Waltrip	Dale Earnhardt, Inc.	Chevrolet
17	Matt Kenseth	Roush Racing	Ford
18	Bobby Labonte	Joe Gibbs Racing	Pontiac
19	Casey Atwood (R)	Evernham Motorsports	Dodge
20	Tony Stewart	Joe Gibbs Racing	Pontiac
21	Elliott Sadler	Wood Brothers Racing	Ford
22	Ward Burton	Bill Davis Racing	Dodge
24	Jeff Gordon	Hendrick Motorsports	Chevrolet
25	Jerry Nadeau	Hendrick Motorsports	Chevrolet
26	Jimmy Spencer	Haas-Carter Motorsports	Ford
27	Kenny Wallace	Eel River Racing	Pontiac
28	Ricky Rudd	Robert Yates Racing	Ford
29	Kevin Harvick (R)	Richard Childress Racing	Chevrolet
31	Mike Skinner	Richard Childress Racing	Chevrolet
32	Ricky Craven	PPI Motorsports	Ford
33	Joe Nemechek	Andy Petree Racing	Chevrolet
36	Ken Schrader	MBV Motorsports	Pontiac
40	Sterling Marlin	Chip Ganassi Racing with Felix Sabates	Dodge
43	John Andretti	Petty Enterprises	Dodge
44	Buckshot Jones	Petty Enterprises	Dodge
45	Kyle Petty	Petty Enterprises	Dodge
50	Rick Mast	Midwest Transit Racing	Chevrolet
55	Bobby Hamilton	Andy Petree Racing	Chevrolet
66	Todd Bodine	Haas-Carter Motorsports	Ford
77	Robert Pressley	Jasper Motorsports	Ford
88	Dale Jarrett	Robert Yates Racing	Ford
90	Hut Stricklin	Donlavey Racing	Ford
92	Stacy Compton	Melling Racing	Dodge
93	Dave Blaney	Bill Davis Racing	Dodge
96	Andy Houston (R)	PPI Motorsports	Ford
97	Kurt Busch (R)	Roush Racing	Ford
99	Jeff Burton	Roush Racing	Ford
Official entry list

== Practice ==
=== First practice ===
The first practice session was held on Friday, March 30, at 11:45 AM CST. The session would last for two hours. Steve Park, driving for Dale Earnhardt, Inc., would set the fastest time in the session, with a lap of 28.266 and an average speed of 191.042 mph (307.452 km/h).

Pos.	#	Driver	Team	Make	Time	Speed
1	1	Steve Park	Dale Earnhardt, Inc.	Chevrolet	28.266	191.042
2	8	Dale Earnhardt Jr.	Dale Earnhardt, Inc.	Chevrolet	28.302	190.799
3	55	Bobby Hamilton	Andy Petree Racing	Chevrolet	28.334	190.584
Full first practice results

=== Final practice ===
The final practice session was held on Saturday, March 31, at 10:00 AM CST. The session would last for one hour and 30 minutes. Johnny Benson Jr., driving for MBV Motorsports, would set the fastest time in the session, with a lap of 28.927 and an average speed of 186.677 mph (300.428 km/h).

Pos.	#	Driver	Team	Make	Time	Speed
1	10	Johnny Benson Jr.	MBV Motorsports	Pontiac	28.927	186.677
2	8	Dale Earnhardt Jr.	Dale Earnhardt, Inc.	Chevrolet	29.014	186.117
3	24	Jeff Gordon	Hendrick Motorsports	Chevrolet	29.020	186.079
Full Final practice results

== Qualifying ==
Qualifying was held on Friday, March 30, at 3:00 PM CST. Each driver would have two laps to set a fastest time; the fastest of the two would count as their official qualifying lap. Positions 1-36 would be decided on time, while positions 37-43 would be based on provisionals. Six spots are awarded by the use of provisionals based on owner's points. The seventh is awarded to a past champion who has not otherwise qualified for the race. If no past champ needs the provisional, the next team in the owner points will be awarded a provisional.

Dale Earnhardt Jr., driving for Dale Earnhardt, Inc., would win the pole, setting a time of 28.320 and an average speed of 190.678 mph (306.866 km/h).

Two drivers would fail to qualify: Kyle Petty and Rick Mast.

=== Full qualifying results ===
Pos.	#	Driver	Team	Make	Time	Speed
1	8	Dale Earnhardt Jr.	Dale Earnhardt, Inc.	Chevrolet	28.320	190.678
2	18	Bobby Labonte	Joe Gibbs Racing	Pontiac	28.352	190.463
3	88	Dale Jarrett	Robert Yates Racing	Ford	28.356	190.436
4	55	Bobby Hamilton	Andy Petree Racing	Chevrolet	28.390	190.208
5	1	Steve Park	Dale Earnhardt, Inc.	Chevrolet	28.449	189.813
6	28	Ricky Rudd	Robert Yates Racing	Ford	28.476	189.633
7	15	Michael Waltrip	Dale Earnhardt, Inc.	Chevrolet	28.536	189.235
8	6	Mark Martin	Roush Racing	Ford	28.552	189.129
9	24	Jeff Gordon	Hendrick Motorsports	Chevrolet	28.564	189.049
10	19	Casey Atwood (R)	Evernham Motorsports	Dodge	28.572	188.996
11	21	Elliott Sadler	Wood Brothers Racing	Ford	28.574	188.983
12	96	Andy Houston (R)	PPI Motorsports	Ford	28.590	188.877
13	36	Ken Schrader	MB2 Motorsports	Pontiac	28.613	188.725
14	12	Jeremy Mayfield	Penske Racing South	Ford	28.623	188.659
15	66	Todd Bodine	Haas-Carter Motorsports	Ford	28.626	188.640
16	97	Kurt Busch (R)	Roush Racing	Ford	28.664	188.390
17	10	Johnny Benson Jr.	MBV Motorsports	Pontiac	28.700	188.153
18	77	Robert Pressley	Jasper Motorsports	Ford	28.786	187.591
19	31	Mike Skinner	Richard Childress Racing	Chevrolet	28.786	187.591
20	14	Ron Hornaday Jr. (R)	A. J. Foyt Enterprises	Pontiac	28.787	187.585
21	90	Hut Stricklin	Donlavey Racing	Ford	28.796	187.526
22	7	Mike Wallace	Ultra Motorsports	Ford	28.797	187.520
23	26	Jimmy Spencer	Haas-Carter Motorsports	Ford	28.799	187.507
24	44	Buckshot Jones	Petty Enterprises	Dodge	28.805	187.467
25	11	Brett Bodine	Brett Bodine Racing	Ford	28.813	187.415
26	92	Stacy Compton	Melling Racing	Dodge	28.815	187.402
27	17	Matt Kenseth	Roush Racing	Ford	28.845	187.207
28	22	Ward Burton	Bill Davis Racing	Dodge	28.856	187.136
29	01	Jason Leffler (R)	Chip Ganassi Racing with Felix Sabates	Dodge	28.860	187.110
30	33	Joe Nemechek	Andy Petree Racing	Chevrolet	28.875	187.013
31	99	Jeff Burton	Roush Racing	Ford	28.884	186.955
32	32	Ricky Craven	PPI Motorsports	Ford	28.885	186.948
33	29	Kevin Harvick (R)	Richard Childress Racing	Chevrolet	28.908	186.800
34	4	Kevin Lepage	Morgan–McClure Motorsports	Chevrolet	28.923	186.703
35	27	Kenny Wallace	Eel River Racing	Pontiac	28.923	186.703
36	25	Jerry Nadeau	Hendrick Motorsports	Chevrolet	28.943	186.574
Provisionals
37	40	Sterling Marlin	Chip Ganassi Racing with Felix Sabates	Dodge	28.959	186.471
38	2	Rusty Wallace	Penske Racing South	Ford	29.096	185.593
39	9	Bill Elliott	Evernham Motorsports	Dodge	29.079	185.701
40	43	John Andretti	Petty Enterprises	Dodge	28.943	186.574
41	20	Tony Stewart	Joe Gibbs Racing	Pontiac	29.029	186.021
42	5	Terry Labonte	Hendrick Motorsports	Chevrolet	29.141	185.306
43	93	Dave Blaney	Bill Davis Racing	Dodge	29.020	186.079
Failed to qualify
44	45	Kyle Petty	Petty Enterprises	Dodge	28.998	186.220
45	50	Rick Mast	Midwest Transit Racing	Chevrolet	29.201	184.925
Official qualifying results

== Race results ==
Fin	#	Driver	Team	Make	Laps	Led	Status	Pts	Winnings
1	88	Dale Jarrett	Robert Yates Racing	Ford	334	122	running	185	$444,527
2	1	Steve Park	Dale Earnhardt, Inc.	Chevrolet	334	79	running	175	$270,443
3	10	Johnny Benson Jr.	MBV Motorsports	Pontiac	334	18	running	170	$193,050
4	97	Kurt Busch (R)	Roush Racing	Ford	334	0	running	160	$162,150
5	24	Jeff Gordon	Hendrick Motorsports	Chevrolet	334	0	running	155	$165,502
6	93	Dave Blaney	Bill Davis Racing	Dodge	334	0	running	150	$102,050
7	29	Kevin Harvick (R)	Richard Childress Racing	Chevrolet	334	0	running	146	$137,777
8	8	Dale Earnhardt Jr.	Dale Earnhardt, Inc.	Chevrolet	334	107	running	147	$135,573
9	6	Mark Martin	Roush Racing	Ford	334	1	running	143	$127,176
10	36	Ken Schrader	MB2 Motorsports	Pontiac	334	0	running	134	$108,685
11	4	Kevin Lepage	Morgan–McClure Motorsports	Chevrolet	334	0	running	130	$92,645
12	2	Rusty Wallace	Penske Racing South	Ford	334	0	running	127	$121,665
13	5	Terry Labonte	Hendrick Motorsports	Chevrolet	334	0	running	124	$111,355
14	9	Bill Elliott	Evernham Motorsports	Dodge	333	0	running	121	$101,248
15	92	Stacy Compton	Melling Racing	Dodge	333	0	running	118	$84,611
16	21	Elliott Sadler	Wood Brothers Racing	Ford	333	0	running	115	$96,590
17	01	Jason Leffler (R)	Chip Ganassi Racing with Felix Sabates	Dodge	332	0	running	112	$84,375
18	55	Bobby Hamilton	Andy Petree Racing	Chevrolet	332	0	running	109	$79,600
19	99	Jeff Burton	Roush Racing	Ford	332	0	running	106	$112,746
20	17	Matt Kenseth	Roush Racing	Ford	332	0	running	103	$80,700
21	22	Ward Burton	Bill Davis Racing	Dodge	331	0	running	100	$102,235
22	12	Jeremy Mayfield	Penske Racing South	Ford	331	0	running	97	$106,184
23	20	Tony Stewart	Joe Gibbs Racing	Pontiac	331	0	running	94	$82,400
24	7	Mike Wallace	Ultra Motorsports	Ford	330	0	running	91	$71,800
25	27	Kenny Wallace	Eel River Racing	Pontiac	330	0	running	88	$62,350
26	90	Hut Stricklin	Donlavey Racing	Ford	330	0	running	85	$58,200
27	32	Ricky Craven	PPI Motorsports	Ford	330	0	running	82	$55,700
28	11	Brett Bodine	Brett Bodine Racing	Ford	329	0	running	79	$56,700
29	25	Jerry Nadeau	Hendrick Motorsports	Chevrolet	327	0	running	76	$62,700
30	31	Mike Skinner	Richard Childress Racing	Chevrolet	326	0	running	73	$83,774
31	43	John Andretti	Petty Enterprises	Dodge	322	0	running	70	$84,077
32	96	Andy Houston (R)	PPI Motorsports	Ford	317	0	running	67	$47,975
33	44	Buckshot Jones	Petty Enterprises	Dodge	316	0	running	64	$54,950
34	40	Sterling Marlin	Chip Ganassi Racing with Felix Sabates	Dodge	298	5	crash	66	$53,925
35	66	Todd Bodine	Haas-Carter Motorsports	Ford	297	0	engine	58	$44,900
36	19	Casey Atwood (R)	Evernham Motorsports	Dodge	269	0	running	55	$43,850
37	28	Ricky Rudd	Robert Yates Racing	Ford	264	0	engine	52	$73,097
38	26	Jimmy Spencer	Haas-Carter Motorsports	Ford	257	0	crash	49	$49,725
39	15	Michael Waltrip	Dale Earnhardt, Inc.	Chevrolet	227	0	running	46	$51,675
40	14	Ron Hornaday Jr. (R)	A. J. Foyt Enterprises	Pontiac	226	0	running	43	$41,625
41	33	Joe Nemechek	Andy Petree Racing	Chevrolet	204	0	crash	40	$69,845
42	18	Bobby Labonte	Joe Gibbs Racing	Pontiac	149	2	engine	42	$94,552
43	77	Robert Pressley	Jasper Motorsports	Ford	33	0	crash	34	$49,722
Official race results

== Standings after the race ==
	Pos	Driver	Points
	1	Dale Jarrett	1,056
	2	Jeff Gordon	981 (–75)
1	3	Johnny Benson Jr.	946 (–110)
1	4	Steve Park	933 (–123)
2	5	Sterling Marlin	889 (–167)
	6	Rusty Wallace	879 (–177)
1	7	Bobby Hamilton	825 (–231)
1	8	Elliott Sadler	824 (–232)
1	9	Bill Elliott	822 (–234)
3	10	Kevin Harvick	811 (–245)

Previous race: 2001 Food City 500	NASCAR Winston Cup Series; 2001 season	Next race: 2001 Virginia 500
