= 2001 Harrah's 500 =

2001 Harrah's 500 may refer to:

- 2001 Harrah's 500 (CART)
- 2001 Harrah's 500 (NASCAR)
