= 2001 Daytona 500 =

43rd iteration of Daytona 500

Race details
- Race 1 of 36 in the 2001 NASCAR Winston Cup Series
- The program for the 2001 Daytona 500, featuring the cars of Jeff Gordon, Dale Jarrett, and Tony Stewart.
- Date: February 18, 2001
- Location: Daytona International Speedway, Daytona Beach, Florida
- Course: Permanent racing facility 2.5 mi (4.02336 km)
- Distance: 200 laps, 500 mi (804.672 km)
- Weather: Warm with temperatures reading up to 79 °F (26 °C); wind speeds up to 29.92 miles per hour (48.15 km/h)
- Average speed: 161.783 miles per hour (260.365 km/h)

Pole position
Driver	Bill Elliott	Evernham Motorsports
- Time: 49.029

Qualifying race winners
Duel 1 Winner	Sterling Marlin	Chip Ganassi Racing
Duel 2 Winner	Mike Skinner	Richard Childress Racing

Most laps led
Driver	Ward Burton	Bill Davis Racing
- Laps: 53

Winner
No. 15	Michael Waltrip	Dale Earnhardt, Inc.

Television in the United States
- Network: Fox
- Announcers: Mike Joy, Darrell Waltrip, and Larry McReynolds
- Nielsen ratings: 10.0

Radio in the United States
- Radio: MRN
- Booth announcers: Joe Moore and Barney Hall
- Turn announcers: Kurt Becker (1 & 2), Mike Bagley (Backstretch) and Eli Gold (3 & 4)

The 2001 Daytona 500, the 43rd running of the event, was the first race of the 2001 NASCAR Winston Cup Series schedule. It was held on February 18, 2001, at Daytona International Speedway in Daytona Beach, Florida, consisting of 200 laps and 500 miles on the 2.5-mile (4 km) asphalt tri-oval.

Bill Elliott won the pole and Michael Waltrip, in his first race in the No. 15 car for Dale Earnhardt, Inc., won the race. This was the first points-paying victory of his Winston Cup career, coming in his 463rd start, the longest wait for a first win. His teammate Dale Earnhardt Jr. finished 2nd and Rusty Wallace finished 3rd.

On the final lap, a fatal accident occurred involving Dale Earnhardt Sr., Ken Schrader, and Sterling Marlin. Earnhardt's car crashed head-on into the retaining wall, killing him. The race was also marred by an 18-car pile-up on lap 173 that began when Ward Burton made contact with Robby Gordon, sending Tony Stewart flipping twice down the backstretch. After Earnhardt's death—as well as other notable deaths of other drivers in other NASCAR national touring series in previous seasons—NASCAR implemented rigorous safety improvements in later seasons. The 2001 Daytona 500 is the last NASCAR Cup Series race to involve a fatal accident.

== Entry list ==
No.	Driver	Team	Manufacturer
01	Jason Leffler (R)	Chip Ganassi Racing with Felix Sabates	Dodge
1	Steve Park	Dale Earnhardt, Inc.	Chevrolet
2	Rusty Wallace	Penske Racing	Ford
3	Dale Earnhardt (W)	Richard Childress Racing	Chevrolet
4	Robby Gordon	Morgan–McClure Motorsports	Chevrolet
5	Terry Labonte	Hendrick Motorsports	Chevrolet
6	Mark Martin	Roush Racing	Ford
7	Mike Wallace	Ultra Motorsports	Ford
8	Dale Earnhardt Jr.	Dale Earnhardt, Inc.	Chevrolet
9	Bill Elliott (W)	Evernham Motorsports	Dodge
10	Johnny Benson Jr.	MBV Motorsports	Pontiac
11	Brett Bodine	Brett Bodine Racing	Ford
12	Jeremy Mayfield	Penske Racing	Ford
14	Ron Hornaday Jr. (R)	A. J. Foyt Racing	Pontiac
15	Michael Waltrip	Dale Earnhardt, Inc.	Chevrolet
17	Matt Kenseth	Roush Racing	Ford
18	Bobby Labonte	Joe Gibbs Racing	Pontiac
19	Casey Atwood (R)	Evernham Motorsports	Dodge
20	Tony Stewart	Joe Gibbs Racing	Pontiac
21	Elliott Sadler	Wood Brothers Racing	Ford
22	Ward Burton	Bill Davis Racing	Dodge
24	Jeff Gordon (W)	Hendrick Motorsports	Chevrolet
25	Jerry Nadeau	Hendrick Motorsports	Chevrolet
26	Jimmy Spencer	Haas-Carter Motorsports	Ford
27	Kenny Wallace	Eel River Racing	Pontiac
28	Ricky Rudd	Robert Yates Racing	Ford
31	Mike Skinner	Richard Childress Racing	Chevrolet
32	Ricky Craven	PPI Motorsports	Ford
33	Joe Nemechek	Andy Petree Racing	Chevrolet
36	Ken Schrader	MBV Motorsports	Pontiac
37	Derrike Cope (W)	Qwest Motor Racing	Pontiac
40	Sterling Marlin (W)	Chip Ganassi Racing with Felix Sabates	Dodge
43	John Andretti	Petty Enterprises	Dodge
44	Buckshot Jones	Petty Enterprises	Dodge
45	Kyle Petty	Petty Enterprises	Dodge
50	Rick Mast	Midwest Transit Racing	Chevrolet
51	Jeff Purvis	Phoenix Racing	Ford
55	Bobby Hamilton	Andy Petree Racing	Chevrolet
66	Todd Bodine	Haas-Carter Motorsports	Ford
71	Dave Marcis	Marcis Auto Racing	Chevrolet
72	Dwayne Leik	Marcis Auto Racing	Chevrolet
77	Robert Pressley	Jasper Motorsports	Ford
80	Morgan Shepherd	Hover Motorsports	Ford
84	Norm Benning	Norm Benning Racing	Chevrolet
85	Carl Long	Mansion Motorsports	Ford
88	Dale Jarrett (W)	Robert Yates Racing	Ford
90	Hut Stricklin	Donlavey Racing	Ford
92	Stacy Compton	Melling Racing	Dodge
93	Dave Blaney	Bill Davis Racing	Dodge
96	Andy Houston (R)	PPI Motorsports	Ford
97	Kurt Busch (R)	Roush Racing	Ford
99	Jeff Burton	Roush Racing	Ford

== Qualifying ==
Qualifying to determine positions 1-2 for the Daytona 500 and the lineup for the Gatorade Duels happened on February 10, 2001. Originally, Bill Elliott and Jerry Nadeau were slated to start first and second, respectively. However, during post qualifying inspection, NASCAR determined that Nadeau had an unapproved shock absorber and spring shackle, and his time was disqualified. Stacy Compton, who was originally third, moved up to second.

Dwayne Leik would be the only driver to not set a time.

Pos.	No.	Driver	Make	Time	Speed
1	9	Bill Elliott	Dodge	49.029	183.565
2	92	Stacy Compton	Dodge	49.266	182.682
3	88	Dale Jarrett	Ford	49.282	182.622
4	20	Tony Stewart	Pontiac	49.306	182.534
5	24	Jeff Gordon	Chevrolet	49.322	182.474
6	22	Ward Burton	Dodge	49.337	182.419
7	40	Sterling Marlin	Dodge	49.412	182.142
8	33	Joe Nemechek	Chevrolet	49.419	182.116
9	31	Mike Skinner	Chevrolet	49.419	182.116
10	32	Ricky Craven	Ford	49.430	182.076
11	10	Johnny Benson	Pontiac	49.453	181.991
12	5	Terry Labonte	Chevrolet	49.502	181.811
13	15	Michael Waltrip	Chevrolet	49.534	181.693
14	93	Dave Blaney	Dodge	49.543	181.660
15	55	Bobby Hamilton	Chevrolet	49.543	181.660
16	43	John Andretti	Dodge	49.566	181.576
17	96	Andy Houston	Ford	49.569	181.565
18	8	Dale Earnhardt Jr	Chevrolet	49.586	181.503
19	4	Robby Gordon	Chevrolet	49.632	181.335
20	28	Ricky Rudd	Ford	49.670	181.196
21	18	Bobby Labonte	Pontiac	49.745	180.923
22	2	Rusty Wallace	Ford	49.763	180.857
23	1	Steve Park	Chevrolet	49.769	180.835
24	99	Jeff Burton	Ford	49.792	180.752
25	19	Casey Atwood	Dodge	49.798	180.730
26	6	Mark Martin	Ford	49.805	180.705
27	3	Dale Earnhardt	Chevrolet	49.808	180.694
28	36	Ken Schrader	Pontiac	49.822	180.643
29	11	Brett Bodine	Ford	49.824	180.636
30	44	Buckshot Jones	Pontiac	49.836	180.592
31	45	Kyle Petty	Dodge	49.839	180.581
32	14	Ron Hornaday	Pontiac	49.853	180.531
33	71	Dave Marcis	Chevrolet	49.893	180.386
34	21	Elliott Sadler	Ford	49.899	180.364
35	26	Jimmy Spencer	Ford	49.928	180.260
36	01	Jason Leffler	Dodge	49.967	180.119
37	66	Todd Bodine	Ford	50.003	179.989
38	27	Kenny Wallace	Pontiac	50.033	179.881
39	51	Jeff Purvis	Ford	50.062	179.777
40	17	Matt Kenseth	Ford	50.124	179.554
41	7	Mike Wallace	Ford	50.151	179.458
42	77	Robert Pressley	Ford	50.187	179.329
43	90	Hut Stricklin	Ford	50.282	178.990
44	50	Rick Mast	Chevrolet	50.396	178.586
45	97	Kurt Busch	Ford	50.417	178.511
46	12	Jeremy Mayfield	Ford	50.529	178.116
47	37	Derrike Cope	Pontiac	50.764	177.291
48	84	Norm Benning	Ford	51.049	176.301
49	85	Carl Long	Ford	51.053	176.287
50	80	Morgan Shepherd	Ford	51.526	174.669
51	72	Dwayne Leik	Chevrolet	Did not start	
DSQ	25	Jerry Nadeau*	Chevrolet	49.224	182.838

== Gatorade 125's ==
The Gatorade 125s are a pair of NASCAR Winston Cup series held in conjunction with the Daytona 500 annually in February at Daytona International Speedway. They consist of two 50 laps and 125 miles in length, which serve as heat races that set up the lineup for the Daytona 500. Both races set the lineup for positions 3–30. The first race sets the lineup for cars that qualified in odd–numbered positions on pole qualifying day. The second race sets the lineup for cars that qualified in even–numbered positions. After qualifying races, the next six positions are determined by fastest times in qualifying who have not yet made the field. The final seven positions go to provisional starters based on last year's car owner points standings.

=== Race 1 results ===
Pos	Grid	No	Driver	Team	Manufacturer	Laps
1	4	40	Sterling Marlin	Chip Ganassi Racing	Dodge	50
2	26	25	Jerry Nadeau	Hendrick Motorsports	Chevrolet	50
3	14	3	Dale Earnhardt	Richard Childress Racing	Chevrolet	50
4	9	96	Andy Houston (R)	PPI Motorsports	Ford	50
5	17	26	Jimmy Spencer	Haas-Carter Motorsports	Ford	50
6	3	24	Jeff Gordon	Hendrick Motorsports	Chevrolet	50
7	24	01	Jason Leffler (R)	Chip Ganassi Racing	Dodge	50
8	25	51	Jeff Purvis	Phoenix Racing	Ford	50
9	7	15	Michael Waltrip	Dale Earnhardt, Inc.	Chevrolet	50
10	13	19	Casey Atwood (R)	Evernham Motorsports	Dodge	50
11	18	27	Kenny Wallace	Eel River Racing	Pontiac	50
12	12	1	Steve Park	Dale Earnhardt, Inc.	Chevrolet	50
13	19	7	Mike Wallace	Ultra Motorsports	Ford	50
14	15	44	Buckshot Jones (R)	Petty Enterprises	Dodge	50
15	20	50	Rick Mast	Midwest Transit Racing	Chevrolet	50
16	5	33	Joe Nemechek	Andy Petree Racing	Chevrolet	50
17	8	55	Bobby Hamilton	Andy Petree Racing	Chevrolet	50
18	21	37	Derrike Cope	Quest Motor Racing	Pontiac	50
19	11	18	Bobby Labonte	Joe Gibbs Racing	Pontiac	50
20	1	9	Bill Elliott	Evernham Motorsports	Dodge	50
21	16	14	Ron Hornaday Jr. (R)	A. J. Foyt Racing	Pontiac	49
22	23	11	Brett Bodine	Brett Bodine Racing	Ford	48
23	10	4	Robby Gordon	Morgan–McClure Motorsports	Chevrolet	47
24	2	88	Dale Jarrett	Robert Yates Racing	Ford	46
25	6	10	Johnny Benson Jr.	MBV Motorsports	Pontiac	45
26	22	85	Carl Long (R)	Mansion Motorsports	Ford	12

=== Race 2 results ===
Pos	Grid	No	Driver	Team	Manufacturer	Laps
1	4	31	Mike Skinner	Richard Childress Racing	Chevrolet	50
2	9	8	Dale Earnhardt Jr.	Dale Earnhardt, Inc.	Chevrolet	50
3	12	99	Jeff Burton	Roush Racing	Ford	50
4	3	22	Ward Burton	Bill Davis Racing	Dodge	50
5	11	2	Rusty Wallace	Penske Racing	Ford	50
6	14	36	Ken Schrader	MB2 Motorsports	Pontiac	50
7	18	17	Matt Kenseth	Roush Racing	Ford	50
8	5	32	Ricky Craven	PPI Motorsports	Ford	50
9	7	93	Dave Blaney	Bill Davis Racing	Dodge	50
10	13	6	Mark Martin	Roush Racing	Ford	50
11	2	20	Tony Stewart	Joe Gibbs Racing	Pontiac	50
12	20	97	Kurt Busch	Roush Racing	Ford	50
13	15	45	Kyle Petty	Petty Enterprises	Dodge	50
14	10	28	Ricky Rudd	Robert Yates Racing	Ford	50
15	6	5	Terry Labonte	Hendrick Motorsports	Chevrolet	50
16	25	12	Jeremy Mayfield	Penske Racing	Ford	50
17	17	66	Todd Bodine	Haas-Carter Motorsports	Ford	50
18	8	43	John Andretti	Petty Enterprises	Dodge	50
19	24	77	Robert Pressley	Jasper Motorsports	Ford	50
20	22	80	Morgan Shepherd	Hover Motorsports	Ford	50
21	23	71	Dave Marcis	Marcis Auto Racing	Chevrolet	50
22	19	90	Hut Stricklin	Donlavey Racing	Ford	50
23	1	92	Stacy Compton	Melling Racing	Dodge	50
24	21	84	Norm Benning (R)	Norm Benning Racing	Chevrolet	48
25	16	21	Elliott Sadler	Wood Brothers Racing	Ford	35
26	26	72	Dwayne Leik (R)	Marcis Auto Racing	Chevrolet	20

=== Starting lineup ===
Pos	No.	Driver	Team	Manufacturer	Notes
1	9	Bill Elliott	Evernham Motorsports	Dodge	Fastest in pole qualifying
2	92	Stacy Compton	Melling Racing	Dodge	Second in pole qualifying
3	40	Sterling Marlin	Chip Ganassi Racing	Dodge	Race 1 Winner
4	31	Mike Skinner	Richard Childress Racing	Chevrolet	Race 2 Winner
5	25	Jerry Nadeau	Hendrick Motorsports	Chevrolet	Second in Race 1
6	8	Dale Earnhardt Jr.	Dale Earnhardt, Inc.	Chevrolet	Second in Race 2
7	3	Dale Earnhardt	Richard Childress Racing	Chevrolet	Third in Race 1
8	99	Jeff Burton	Roush Racing	Ford	Third in Race 2
9	96	Andy Houston (R)	PPI Motorsports	Ford	Fourth in Race 1
10	22	Ward Burton	Bill Davis Racing	Dodge	Fourth in Race 2
11	26	Jimmy Spencer	Haas-Carter Motorsports	Ford	Fifth in Race 1
12	2	Rusty Wallace	Penske Racing	Ford	Fifth in Race 2
13	24	Jeff Gordon	Hendrick Motorsports	Chevrolet	Sixth in Race 1
14	36	Ken Schrader	MB2 Motorsports	Pontiac	Sixth in Race 2
15	01	Jason Leffler (R)	Chip Ganassi Racing	Dodge	Seventh in Race 1
16	17	Matt Kenseth	Roush Racing	Ford	Seventh in Race 2
17	51	Jeff Purvis	Phoenix Racing	Ford	Eighth in Race 1
18	32	Ricky Craven	PPI Motorsports	Ford	Eighth in Race 2
19	15	Michael Waltrip	Dale Earnhardt, Inc.	Chevrolet	Ninth in Race 1
20	93	Dave Blaney	Bill Davis Racing	Dodge	Ninth in Race 2
21	19	Casey Atwood (R)	Evernham Motorsports	Dodge	Tenth in Race 1
22	6	Mark Martin	Roush Racing	Ford	Tenth in Race 2
23	27	Kenny Wallace	Eel River Racing	Pontiac	Eleventh in Race 1
24	20	Tony Stewart	Joe Gibbs Racing	Pontiac	Eleventh in Race 2
25	1	Steve Park	Dale Earnhardt, Inc.	Chevrolet	Twelfth in Race 1
26	97	Kurt Busch	Roush Racing	Ford	Twelfth in Race 2
27	7	Mike Wallace	Ultra Motorsports	Ford	Thirteenth in Race 1
28	45	Kyle Petty	Petty Enterprises	Dodge	Thirteenth in Race 2
29	44	Buckshot Jones (R)	Petty Enterprises	Dodge	Fourteenth in Race 1
30	28	Ricky Rudd	Robert Yates Racing	Ford	Fourteenth in Race 2
31	88	Dale Jarrett	Robert Yates Racing	Ford	Qualifying Speed
32	33	Joe Nemechek	Andy Petree Racing	Chevrolet	Qualifying Speed
33	10	Johnny Benson Jr.	MBV Motorsports	Pontiac	Qualifying Speed
34	5	Terry Labonte	Hendrick Motorsports	Chevrolet	Qualifying Speed
35	55	Bobby Hamilton	Andy Petree Racing	Chevrolet	Qualifying Speed
36	43	John Andretti	Petty Enterprises	Dodge	Qualifying Speed
37	18	Bobby Labonte	Joe Gibbs Racing	Pontiac	Provisional
38	12	Jeremy Mayfield	Penske Racing	Ford	Provisional
39	77	Robert Pressley	Jasper Motorsports	Ford	Provisional
40	21	Elliott Sadler	Wood Brothers Racing	Ford	Provisional
41	4	Robby Gordon	Morgan–McClure Motorsports	Chevrolet	Provisional
42	14	Ron Hornaday Jr. (R)	A. J. Foyt Racing	Pontiac	Provisional
43	11	Brett Bodine	Brett Bodine Racing	Ford	Provisional
Did not qualify
	71	Dave Marcis	Marcis Auto Racing	Chevrolet	
	66	Todd Bodine	Haas-Carter Motorsports	Ford	
	90	Hut Stricklin	Donlavey Racing	Ford	
	50	Rick Mast	Midwest Transit Racing	Chevrolet	
	37	Derrike Cope	Quest Motor Racing	Pontiac	
	84	Norm Benning (R)	Norm Benning Racing	Chevrolet	
	85	Carl Long (R)	Mansion Motorsports	Ford	
	80	Morgan Shepherd	Hover Motorsports	Ford	
	72	Dwayne Leik (R)	Marcis Auto Racing	Chevrolet	

== Race summary ==
Polesitter Bill Elliott led the field to the green flag, but he only led one lap before Sterling Marlin (the winner of the first 125-mile qualifying race three days earlier) passed him for the lead. On lap 29, Rusty Wallace drove into his pit after his right front tire had suddenly gone flat. NASCAR determined that he had exceeded the pit road speed limit on his way in and he was consequently issued a 15-second penalty. As a result, he went a lap down and attempted to make up for it by skipping the first scheduled pit stop. The first caution came out on lap 48 when Jeff Purvis bounced off the wall between turns 3 & 4. The race restarted and stayed under a long green-flag run that lasted 105 laps, in which Ward Burton led the most. On lap 87, Dale Earnhardt and rookie Kurt Busch made door-to-door contact coming out of turn 4 while battling for fifth place. Earnhardt promptly gave Busch the finger at 185 mph or, as described by lap-by-lap commentator Mike Joy, he simply was saying "Kurt, you're number 1".

The second caution came out on lap 157 when Busch, trying to pass Joe Nemechek, hit the front stretch wall and slid across the track right through the infield and onto pit road. On lap 167, Steve Park took the lead, only to be passed by his teammate Michael Waltrip on the next lap.

=== The Big One ===
On lap 173, a huge crash eliminated 18 cars in a spectacular fashion. This began when Robby Gordon, coming onto the back straightaway, turned Ward Burton in the outside lane. Burton then hit Tony Stewart, who turned back across the middle of the racetrack, collecting most of the field behind him. Stewart took the worst ride of any driver in that crash, as his car turned against the wall after being hit by Burton, caught a pocket of air, got pushed airborne over Robby Gordon and flipped over twice, and then landed on top of Jason Leffler before coasting to a stop in the infield. Bobby Labonte's hood broke off and got attached to Stewart's car, causing his engine to catch fire. Stewart's vehicle was described as something similar to Richard Petty's rollover crash in the 1988 race. Mark Martin collided first with the outside wall and then got hit by at least two other cars, destroying the rear end of his. Martin managed to limp his car back to pit road and abandon it. Also involved in this crash were Jeff Gordon, Terry Labonte, Andy Houston, Buckshot Jones, Dale Jarrett (the defending Daytona 500 winner), Jeff Burton, Elliott Sadler, Kenny Wallace, John Andretti, and Jerry Nadeau. Only a few drivers, including Earnhardt; Elliott; Ron Hornaday Jr.; and Ken Schrader, were able to avoid the crash with intact cars. The race was red-flagged for extensive cleanup. When the red flag was over, the race restarted on lap 180, with Dale Earnhardt Jr. in the lead. Marlin led the next three laps before Waltrip took over again.

=== Death of Dale Earnhardt and race finish ===
As the race neared its end, Darrell Waltrip in the Fox Sports booth became audibly excited and anxious while his younger brother Michael was poised to win his first NASCAR Cup Series race, cheering him on from the press box. As the white flag waved for the final lap, Earnhardt, Jr. ran second behind Waltrip with his father close behind in third. Earnhardt, who owned the two cars in front of him, was driving aggressively in an attempt to keep the pack, including Sterling Marlin, Ken Schrader, and Rusty Wallace, away from the race for the win. Entering turn 3, Earnhardt threw a block on Marlin, who was looking to make a pass on the bottom. Earnhardt's car was not clear, and his rear bumper clipped Marlin's front bumper, sending him into a skid with the nose of the car on the apron. Trying to correct at speed, Earnhardt sharply counter-steered against the slide, which redirected the car sharply back up the track into the path of Ken Schrader. Schrader rammed into him behind the passenger door, causing Earnhardt's car to snap, rapidly changing its angle toward the wall. As Schrader came into contact, Earnhardt crashed into the wall nose-first at an estimated speed of 155–160 mph (250-257 km/h). Both cars slid down the steep banking off the track and into the infield grass. While this two-car wreck was in progress, drivers were allowed to race to the finish under green flag conditions.

Michael Waltrip claimed his first Winston Cup victory as the field raced back, with his teammate Earnhardt Jr. 0.124 seconds behind in second. The yellow and checkered flags came out simultaneously as Waltrip crossed the line, locking the rest of the field in their positions at that moment. Earnhardt and Schrader were credited finishing 12th and 13th despite not finishing the race. Schrader was the first person to witness the scene of Earnhardt's crash, and upon seeing the interior of the car he immediately called for urgent help. Waltrip celebrated in victory lane with his team, unaware of the severity of the incident until Schrader arrived to tell him the accident had been severe. Earnhardt's failure to emerge under his own power and resulting absence in victory lane as the winning car owner raised concern over his condition, as he was known for being a resilient driver who was hurt in far more visually violent crashes just a few years before, but very rarely sidelined. Earnhardt was extricated from his car and was transported by ambulance to the nearby Halifax Medical Center, where he was pronounced dead at 5:16 pm EST, reportedly surrounded by his wife Teresa, his team owner and closest friend Richard Childress, and his son Earnhardt Jr. The official announcement of Earnhardt's death was made at about 7:00 pm EST by NASCAR president Mike Helton. The death of the seven-time Winston Cup Champion largely overshadowed Waltrip's first Winston Cup victory and the 18-car crash on lap 173.

== Results ==
Pos	Grid	Car No.	Driver	Team	Manufacturer	Laps	Laps Led	Time/Retired
1	19	15	Michael Waltrip	Dale Earnhardt, Inc.	Chevrolet	200	27	3:05:26
2	6	8	Dale Earnhardt Jr.	Dale Earnhardt, Inc.	Chevrolet	200	13	+0.124
3	12	2	Rusty Wallace	Penske Racing	Ford	200	0	Lead lap under caution
4	30	28	Ricky Rudd	Robert Yates Racing	Ford	200	0	Lead lap under caution
5	1	9	Bill Elliott (W)	Evernham Motorsports	Dodge	200	1	Lead lap under caution
6	27	7	Mike Wallace	Ultra Motorsports	Ford	200	0	Lead lap under caution
7	3	40	Sterling Marlin (W)	Chip Ganassi Racing	Dodge	200	39	Lead lap under caution
8	35	55	Bobby Hamilton	Andy Petree Racing	Chevrolet	200	0	Lead lap under caution
9	38	12	Jeremy Mayfield	Penske Racing	Ford	200	0	Lead lap under caution
10	2	92	Stacy Compton	Melling Racing	Dodge	200	0	Lead lap under caution
11	32	33	Joe Nemechek	Andy Petree Racing	Chevrolet	200	0	Lead lap under caution
12	7	3	Dale Earnhardt (W) †	Richard Childress Racing	Chevrolet	199	17	Accident (fatal)
13	14	36	Ken Schrader	MB2 Motorsports	Pontiac	199	0	Accident
14	39	77	Robert Pressley	Jasper Motorsports	Ford	199	0	+1 lap
15	43	11	Brett Bodine	Brett Bodine Racing	Ford	199	1	+1 lap
16	28	45	Kyle Petty	Petty Enterprises	Dodge	199	0	+1 lap
17	42	14	Ron Hornaday Jr. (R)	A. J. Foyt Racing	Pontiac	199	0	+1 lap
18	40	21	Elliott Sadler	Wood Brothers Racing	Ford	199	0	+1 lap
19	8	99	Jeff Burton	Roush Racing	Ford	199	0	+1 lap
20	21	19	Casey Atwood (R)	Evernham Motorsports	Dodge	198	0	+2 laps
21	16	17	Matt Kenseth	Roush Racing	Ford	196	0	+4 laps
22	31	88	Dale Jarrett (W)	Robert Yates Racing	Ford	186	1	Accident
23	18	32	Ricky Craven	PPI Motorsports	Ford	185	0	+15 laps
24	34	5	Terry Labonte	Hendrick Motorsports	Chevrolet	184	0	Accident
25	23	27	Kenny Wallace	Eel River Racing	Pontiac	184	0	Accident
26	4	31	Mike Skinner	Richard Childress Racing	Chevrolet	183	24	+17 laps
27	11	26	Jimmy Spencer	Haas-Carter Motorsports	Ford	183	0	+17 laps
28	33	10	Johnny Benson Jr.	MBV Motorsports	Pontiac	181	0	Engine
29	29	44	Buckshot Jones (R)	Petty Enterprises	Dodge	181	0	Accident
30	13	24	Jeff Gordon (W)	Hendrick Motorsports	Chevrolet	178	11	Accident
31	25	1	Steve Park	Dale Earnhardt, Inc.	Chevrolet	177	2	+23 laps
32	5	25	Jerry Nadeau	Hendrick Motorsports	Chevrolet	176	0	Accident
33	22	6	Mark Martin	Roush Racing	Ford	175	1	Accident
34	15	01	Jason Leffler (R)	Chip Ganassi Racing	Dodge	174	0	Accident
35	10	22	Ward Burton	Bill Davis Racing	Dodge	173	53	Accident
36	24	20	Tony Stewart	Joe Gibbs Racing	Pontiac	173	0	Accident
37	41	4	Robby Gordon	Morgan–McClure Motorsports	Chevrolet	173	0	Accident
38	9	96	Andy Houston (R)	PPI Motorsports	Ford	173	0	Accident
39	36	43	John Andretti	Petty Enterprises	Dodge	173	0	Accident
40	37	18	Bobby Labonte	Joe Gibbs Racing	Pontiac	173	3	Accident
41	26	97	Kurt Busch (R)	Roush Racing	Ford	169	0	+31 laps
42	20	93	Dave Blaney	Bill Davis Racing	Dodge	135	0	Engine
43	17	51	Jeff Purvis	Phoenix Racing	Ford	47	0	Accident

== Standings after the race ==
Pos	Driver	Points
1	Michael Waltrip	180
2	Dale Earnhardt Jr.	175 (–5)
3	Rusty Wallace	165 (–15)
4	Ricky Rudd	160 (–20)
5	Bill Elliott	160 (–20)
6	Sterling Marlin	151 (–29)
7	Mike Wallace	150 (–30)
8	Bobby Hamilton	142 (–38)
9	Jeremy Mayfield	138 (–42)
10	Stacy Compton	132 (–48)

== Media ==
The 2001 Daytona 500 marked the first Cup Series race under NASCAR's new centralized television contracts, which shifted responsibility for NASCAR's media rights from the track owners (which led to events being inconsistently scattered across multiple networks, including long-time rightsholder CBS) to NASCAR itself. NASCAR entered into six-year deals with two broadcasters, Fox Sports and NBC Sports (with NBC sub-licensing cable rights to TNT, and Fox using its then-sister cable network FX), to serve as rightsholders for each respective half of the season in the Winston Cup Series and Busch Series. Fox and NBC alternated rights to the two Daytona race weekends annually.

Mike Joy joined Fox from CBS to continue as lead announcer. Former driver Darrell Waltrip and crew chief Larry McReynolds would join Joy in the booth as analysts. Joy, Waltrip, and McReynolds would consistently remain Fox's on-air team until 2016, when McReynolds became the rules and technical analyst, replaced in the booth by Jeff Gordon. Darrell Waltrip retired from broadcasting in June 2019, leaving Joy and Gordon as a two-man booth for the 2020 season until Clint Bowyer was hired for the 2021 season and Gordon leaving at the end of the season.
