= 2001 Talladega 500 =

Race details
- Race 9 of 36 in the 2001 NASCAR Winston Cup Series season
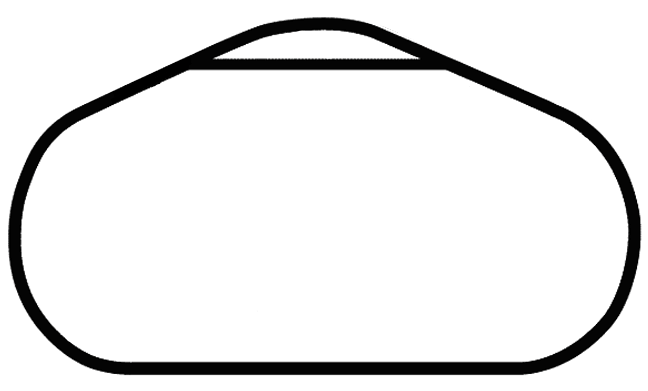
- Map of the Talladega Superspeedway
- Date: April 22, 2001
- Official name: Talladega 500
- Location: Talladega Superspeedway, Lincoln, Alabama
- Course: Permanent racing facility
- Course length: 2.660 miles (4.281 km)
- Distance: 188 laps, 500.080 mi (804.801 km)
- Weather: Temperatures of 57.9 °F (14.4 °C) and 82.9 °F (28.3 °C); Wind speeds of 11.1 miles per hour (17.9 km/h)
- Average speed: 184.003 miles per hour (296.124 km/h)

Pole position
| Driver | Stacy Compton | Mark Melling |

Most laps led
| Driver | Sterling Marlin | Chip Ganassi |
- Laps: 51

Winner
| No. 55 | Bobby Hamilton | Andy Petree |

Television in the United States
- Network: Fox
- Announcers: Mike Joy; Darrell Waltrip; Larry McReynolds

The 2001 Talladega 500 was a NASCAR Winston Cup Series race that took place on April 22, 2001, at Talladega Superspeedway in Lincoln, Alabama. A total prize purse of $3,233,740 ($5,879,804 when adjusted for inflation); with $173,855 to the winner ($316,115 when adjusted for inflation).

== Race report ==
Kenny Wallace, Kyle Petty, Rick Mast, Hut Stricklin and Andy Hillenburg would fail to qualify for this race.

Stacy Compton would be credited with a last-place finish due to engine failure on lap 116 of the 188-lap race. Bobby Hamilton would defeat Tony Stewart by 2/10ths of a second after racing a completely caution-free race for almost three hours. The last-place finisher, Compton, qualified for the pole position with a speed of 184.861 mph (297.505 km/h).

Sterling Marlin had the best car in the race but finished in 23rd place; leading 51 laps and overtaking competitors like Michael Waltrip, Dale Earnhardt, Jr., Jeff Burton, and Stacy Compton. While Marlin was the class of the field, late in the race he got shuffled back.

This was the only time Andy Houston led a lap in a Cup race. Mike Skinner, who finished 29th, crossed the finish line less than 4 seconds behind winner Bobby Hamilton. Hamilton, who qualified with a speed of 182.99 mph, was like most of the field which ran the 500 miles faster than their 1-lap qualification.

Despite the lack of a big crash in the crucial moments of the race, there were still some exciting parts in the race for NASCAR fans in the form of lead changes and drivers leading multiple laps. The last event to end without any caution periods was in 1999. It would be Hamilton's last win. He died 6 years later from head and neck cancer.

== Entry list ==
- (R) denotes rookie driver.

| No. | Driver | Team | Manufacturer |
|---|---|---|---|
| 01 | Jason Leffler (R) | Chip Ganassi Racing | Dodge |
| 1 | Steve Park | Dale Earnhardt, Inc. | Chevrolet |
| 2 | Rusty Wallace | Penske Racing South | Ford |
| 4 | Kevin Lepage | Morgan-McClure Motorsports | Chevrolet |
| 5 | Terry Labonte | Hendrick Motorsports | Chevrolet |
| 6 | Mark Martin | Roush Racing | Ford |
| 7 | Mike Wallace | Ultra Motorsports | Ford |
| 8 | Dale Earnhardt Jr. | Dale Earnhardt, Inc. | Chevrolet |
| 9 | Bill Elliott | Evernham Motorsports | Dodge |
| 10 | Johnny Benson Jr. | MBV Motorsports | Pontiac |
| 11 | Brett Bodine | Brett Bodine Racing | Ford |
| 12 | Jeremy Mayfield | Penske Racing South | Ford |
| 14 | Ron Hornaday Jr. (R) | A. J. Foyt Racing | Pontiac |
| 15 | Michael Waltrip | Dale Earnhardt, Inc. | Chevrolet |
| 17 | Matt Kenseth | Roush Racing | Ford |
| 18 | Bobby Labonte | Joe Gibbs Racing | Pontiac |
| 19 | Casey Atwood (R) | Evernham Motorsports | Dodge |
| 20 | Tony Stewart | Joe Gibbs Racing | Pontiac |
| 21 | Elliott Sadler | Wood Brothers Racing | Ford |
| 22 | Ward Burton | Bill Davis Racing | Dodge |
| 24 | Jeff Gordon | Hendrick Motorsports | Chevrolet |
| 25 | Jerry Nadeau | Hendrick Motorsports | Chevrolet |
| 26 | Jimmy Spencer | Haas-Carter Motorsports | Ford |
| 27 | Kenny Wallace | Eel River Racing | Pontiac |
| 28 | Ricky Rudd | Robert Yates Racing | Ford |
| 29 | Kevin Harvick (R) | Richard Childress Racing | Chevrolet |
| 31 | Mike Skinner | Richard Childress Racing | Chevrolet |
| 32 | Ricky Craven | PPI Motorsports | Ford |
| 33 | Joe Nemechek | Andy Petree Racing | Chevrolet |
| 36 | Ken Schrader | MBV Motorsports | Pontiac |
| 40 | Sterling Marlin | Chip Ganassi Racing | Dodge |
| 43 | John Andretti | Petty Enterprises | Dodge |
| 44 | Buckshot Jones | Petty Enterprises | Dodge |
| 45 | Kyle Petty | Petty Enterprises | Dodge |
| 49 | Andy Hillenburg | BAM Racing | Pontiac |
| 50 | Rick Mast | Midwest Transit Racing | Chevrolet |
| 51 | Jeff Purvis | Phoenix Racing | Ford |
| 55 | Bobby Hamilton | Andy Petree Racing | Chevrolet |
| 66 | Todd Bodine | Haas-Carter Motorsports | Ford |
| 71 | Dave Marcis | Marcis Auto Racing | Chevrolet |
| 77 | Robert Pressley | Jasper Motorsports | Ford |
| 88 | Dale Jarrett | Robert Yates Racing | Ford |
| 90 | Hut Stricklin | Donlavey Racing | Ford |
| 92 | Stacy Compton | Melling Racing | Dodge |
| 93 | Dave Blaney | Bill Davis Racing | Dodge |
| 96 | Andy Houston (R) | PPI Motorsports | Ford |
| 97 | Kurt Busch (R) | Roush Racing | Ford |
| 99 | Jeff Burton | Roush Racing | Ford |

== Practice ==
=== First practice ===
| Pos | No. | Driver | Team | Manufacturer | Time | Speed |
|---|---|---|---|---|---|---|
| 1 | 32 | Ricky Craven | PPI Motorsports | Ford | 51.470 | 186.050 |
| 2 | 6 | Mark Martin | Roush Racing | Ford | 51.789 | 184.904 |
| 3 | 40 | Sterling Marlin | Chip Ganassi Racing | Dodge | 51.891 | 184.541 |
Official first practice results

=== Final practice ===
| Pos | No. | Driver | Team | Manufacturer | Time | Speed |
|---|---|---|---|---|---|---|
| 1 | 97 | Kurt Busch (R) | Roush Racing | Ford | 49.735 | 192.540 |
| 2 | 32 | Ricky Craven | PPI Motorsports | Ford | 49.835 | 192.154 |
| 3 | 4 | Kevin Lepage | Morgan-McClure Motorsports | Chevrolet | 49.875 | 192.000 |
Official final practice results

== Qualifying ==
| Pos | No. | Driver | Team | Manufacturer | Time |
|---|---|---|---|---|---|
| 1 | 92 | Stacy Compton | Melling Racing | Dodge | 51.801 |
| 2 | 40 | Sterling Marlin | Chip Ganassi Racing | Dodge | 51.881 |
| 3 | 9 | Bill Elliott | Evernham Motorsports | Dodge | 52.041 |
| 4 | 32 | Ricky Craven | PPI Motorsports | Ford | 52.072 |
| 5 | 6 | Mark Martin | Roush Racing | Ford | 52.082 |
| 6 | 88 | Dale Jarrett | Robert Yates Racing | Ford | 52.115 |
| 7 | 20 | Tony Stewart | Joe Gibbs Racing | Pontiac | 52.128 |
| 8 | 15 | Michael Waltrip | Dale Earnhardt, Inc. | Chevrolet | 52.164 |
| 9 | 29 | Kevin Harvick (R) | Richard Childress Racing | Chevrolet | 52.183 |
| 10 | 33 | Joe Nemechek | Andy Petree Racing | Chevrolet | 52.190 |
| 11 | 25 | Jerry Nadeau | Hendrick Motorsports | Chevrolet | 52.232 |
| 12 | 31 | Mike Skinner | Richard Childress Racing | Chevrolet | 52.291 |
| 13 | 24 | Jeff Gordon | Hendrick Motorsports | Chevrolet | 52.299 |
| 14 | 55 | Bobby Hamilton | Andy Petree Racing | Chevrolet | 52.332 |
| 15 | 71 | Dave Marcis | Marcis Auto Racing | Chevrolet | 52.342 |
| 16 | 93 | Dave Blaney | Bill Davis Racing | Dodge | 52.357 |
| 17 | 1 | Steve Park | Dale Earnhardt, Inc. | Chevrolet | 52.364 |
| 18 | 4 | Kevin Lepage | Morgan-McClure Motorsports | Chevrolet | 52.388 |
| 19 | 8 | Dale Earnhardt Jr. | Dale Earnhardt, Inc. | Chevrolet | 52.389 |
| 20 | 66 | Todd Bodine | Haas-Carter Motorsports | Ford | 52.433 |
| 21 | 19 | Casey Atwood (R) | Evernham Motorsports | Dodge | 52.438 |
| 22 | 99 | Jeff Burton | Roush Racing | Ford | 52.456 |
| 23 | 11 | Brett Bodine | Brett Bodine Racing | Ford | 52.465 |
| 24 | 96 | Andy Houston (R) | PPI Motorsports | Ford | 52.479 |
| 25 | 01 | Jason Leffler (R) | Chip Ganassi Racing | Dodge | 52.533 |
| 26 | 2 | Rusty Wallace | Penske Racing South | Ford | 52.536 |
| 27 | 97 | Kurt Busch (R) | Roush Racing | Ford | 52.550 |
| 28 | 77 | Robert Pressley | Jasper Motorsports | Ford | 52.551 |
| 29 | 44 | Buckshot Jones | Petty Enterprises | Dodge | 52.588 |
| 30 | 18 | Bobby Labonte | Joe Gibbs Racing | Pontiac | 52.626 |
| 31 | 5 | Terry Labonte | Hendrick Motorsports | Chevrolet | 52.641 |
| 32 | 28 | Ricky Rudd | Robert Yates Racing | Ford | 52.656 |
| 33 | 51 | Jeff Purvis | Phoenix Racing | Ford | 52.683 |
| 34 | 26 | Jimmy Spencer | Haas-Carter Motorsports | Ford | 52.701 |
| 35 | 43 | John Andretti | Petty Enterprises | Dodge | 52.705 |
| 36 | 36 | Ken Schrader | MBV Motorsports | Pontiac | 52.783 |
Provisionals
| 37 | 10 | Johnny Benson Jr. | MBV Motorsports | Pontiac | — |
| 38 | 21 | Elliott Sadler | Wood Brothers Racing | Ford | — |
| 39 | 22 | Ward Burton | Bill Davis Racing | Dodge | — |
| 40 | 17 | Matt Kenseth | Roush Racing | Ford | — |
| 41 | 12 | Jeremy Mayfield | Penske Racing South | Ford | — |
| 42 | 14 | Ron Hornaday Jr. (R) | A. J. Foyt Racing | Pontiac | — |
| 43 | 7 | Mike Wallace | Ultra Motorsports | Ford | — |
Did not qualify
| | 27 | Kenny Wallace | Eel River Racing | Pontiac | 52.793 |
| | 45 | Kyle Petty | Petty Enterprises | Dodge | 52.851 |
| | 50 | Rick Mast | Midwest Transit Racing | Chevrolet | 52.873 |
| | 90 | Hut Stricklin | Donlavey Racing | Ford | 53.009 |
| | 49 | Andy Hillenburg | BAM Racing | Pontiac | 53.091 |

== Race results ==
| Pos | Grid | No | Driver | Team | Manufacturer | Laps | Points |
|---|---|---|---|---|---|---|---|
| 1 | 14 | 55 | Bobby Hamilton | Andy Petree Racing | Chevrolet | 188 | 180 |
| 2 | 7 | 20 | Tony Stewart | Joe Gibbs Racing | Pontiac | 188 | 175 |
| 3 | 27 | 97 | Kurt Busch (R) | Roush Racing | Ford | 188 | 170 |
| 4 | 5 | 6 | Mark Martin | Roush Racing | Ford | 188 | 165 |
| 5 | 30 | 18 | Bobby Labonte | Joe Gibbs Racing | Pontiac | 188 | 160 |
| 6 | 10 | 33 | Joe Nemechek | Andy Petree Racing | Chevrolet | 188 | 155 |
| 7 | 37 | 10 | Johnny Benson Jr. | MBV Motorsports | Pontiac | 188 | 146 |
| 8 | 19 | 8 | Dale Earnhardt Jr. | Dale Earnhardt, Inc. | Chevrolet | 188 | 147 |
| 9 | 43 | 7 | Mike Wallace | Ultra Motorsports | Ford | 188 | 138 |
| 10 | 22 | 99 | Jeff Burton | Roush Racing | Ford | 188 | 139 |
| 11 | 31 | 5 | Terry Labonte | Hendrick Motorsports | Chevrolet | 188 | 130 |
| 12 | 9 | 29 | Kevin Harvick (R) | Richard Childress Racing | Chevrolet | 188 | 127 |
| 13 | 26 | 2 | Rusty Wallace | Penske Racing South | Ford | 188 | 129 |
| 14 | 32 | 28 | Ricky Rudd | Robert Yates Racing | Ford | 188 | 126 |
| 15 | 4 | 32 | Ricky Craven | PPI Motorsports | Ford | 188 | 123 |
| 16 | 29 | 44 | Buckshot Jones | Petty Enterprises | Dodge | 188 | 115 |
| 17 | 16 | 93 | Dave Blaney | Bill Davis Racing | Dodge | 188 | 112 |
| 18 | 6 | 88 | Dale Jarrett | Robert Yates Racing | Ford | 188 | 109 |
| 19 | 40 | 17 | Matt Kenseth | Roush Racing | Ford | 188 | 111 |
| 20 | 25 | 01 | Jason Leffler (R) | Chip Ganassi Racing | Dodge | 188 | 103 |
| 21 | 24 | 96 | Andy Houston (R) | PPI Motorsports | Ford | 188 | 105 |
| 22 | 42 | 14 | Ron Hornaday Jr. (R) | A. J. Foyt Racing | Pontiac | 188 | 102 |
| 23 | 2 | 40 | Sterling Marlin | Chip Ganassi Racing | Dodge | 188 | 104 |
| 24 | 28 | 77 | Robert Pressley | Jasper Motorsports | Ford | 188 | 96 |
| 25 | 11 | 25 | Jerry Nadeau | Hendrick Motorsports | Chevrolet | 188 | 93 |
| 26 | 23 | 11 | Brett Bodine | Brett Bodine Racing | Ford | 188 | 85 |
| 27 | 13 | 24 | Jeff Gordon | Hendrick Motorsports | Chevrolet | 188 | 87 |
| 28 | 8 | 15 | Michael Waltrip | Dale Earnhardt, Inc. | Chevrolet | 188 | 84 |
| 29 | 12 | 31 | Mike Skinner | Richard Childress Racing | Chevrolet | 188 | 81 |
| 30 | 21 | 19 | Casey Atwood (R) | Evernham Motorsports | Dodge | 187 | 73 |
| 31 | 17 | 1 | Steve Park | Dale Earnhardt, Inc. | Chevrolet | 187 | 70 |
| 32 | 3 | 9 | Bill Elliott | Evernham Motorsports | Dodge | 187 | 72 |
| 33 | 39 | 22 | Ward Burton | Bill Davis Racing | Dodge | 187 | 69 |
| 34 | 33 | 51 | Jeff Purvis | Phoenix Racing | Ford | 187 | 61 |
| 35 | 41 | 12 | Jeremy Mayfield | Penske Racing South | Ford | 187 | 58 |
| 36 | 34 | 26 | Jimmy Spencer | Haas-Carter Motorsports | Ford | 187 | 55 |
| 37 | 35 | 43 | John Andretti | Petty Enterprises | Dodge | 187 | 52 |
| 38 | 15 | 71 | Dave Marcis | Marcis Auto Racing | Chevrolet | 186 | 49 |
| 39 | 38 | 21 | Elliott Sadler | Wood Brothers Racing | Ford | 186 | 51 |
| 40 | 36 | 36 | Ken Schrader | MBV Motorsports | Pontiac | 186 | 48 |
| 41 | 20 | 66 | Todd Bodine | Haas-Carter Motorsports | Ford | 181 | 45 |
| 42 | 18 | 4 | Kevin Lepage | Morgan-McClure Motorsports | Chevrolet | 158 | 37 |
| 43 | 1 | 92 | Stacy Compton | Melling Racing | Dodge | 116 | 39 |
Official race results

== Standings after the race ==
| | Pos | Driver | Points |
|---|---|---|---|
| | 1 | Dale Jarrett | 1,345 |
| | 2 | Jeff Gordon | 1,200 (–145) |
| | 3 | Johnny Benson Jr. | 1,195 (–150) |
| 3 | 4 | Bobby Hamilton | 1,175 (–170) |
| 1 | 5 | Sterling Marlin | 1,153 (–192) |
| | 6 | Rusty Wallace | 1,137 (–208) |
| 2 | 7 | Steve Park | 1,109 (–236) |
| | 8 | Ricky Rudd | 1,096 (–249) |
| 4 | 9 | Tony Stewart | 1,047 (–298) |
| 1 | 10 | Bill Elliott | 1,015 (–330) |

| Preceded by 2001 Virginia 500 | NASCAR Winston Cup Series Season; 2001 | Succeeded by 2001 NAPA Auto Parts 500 |
