= Buckshot Jones =

American racing driver (born 1970)

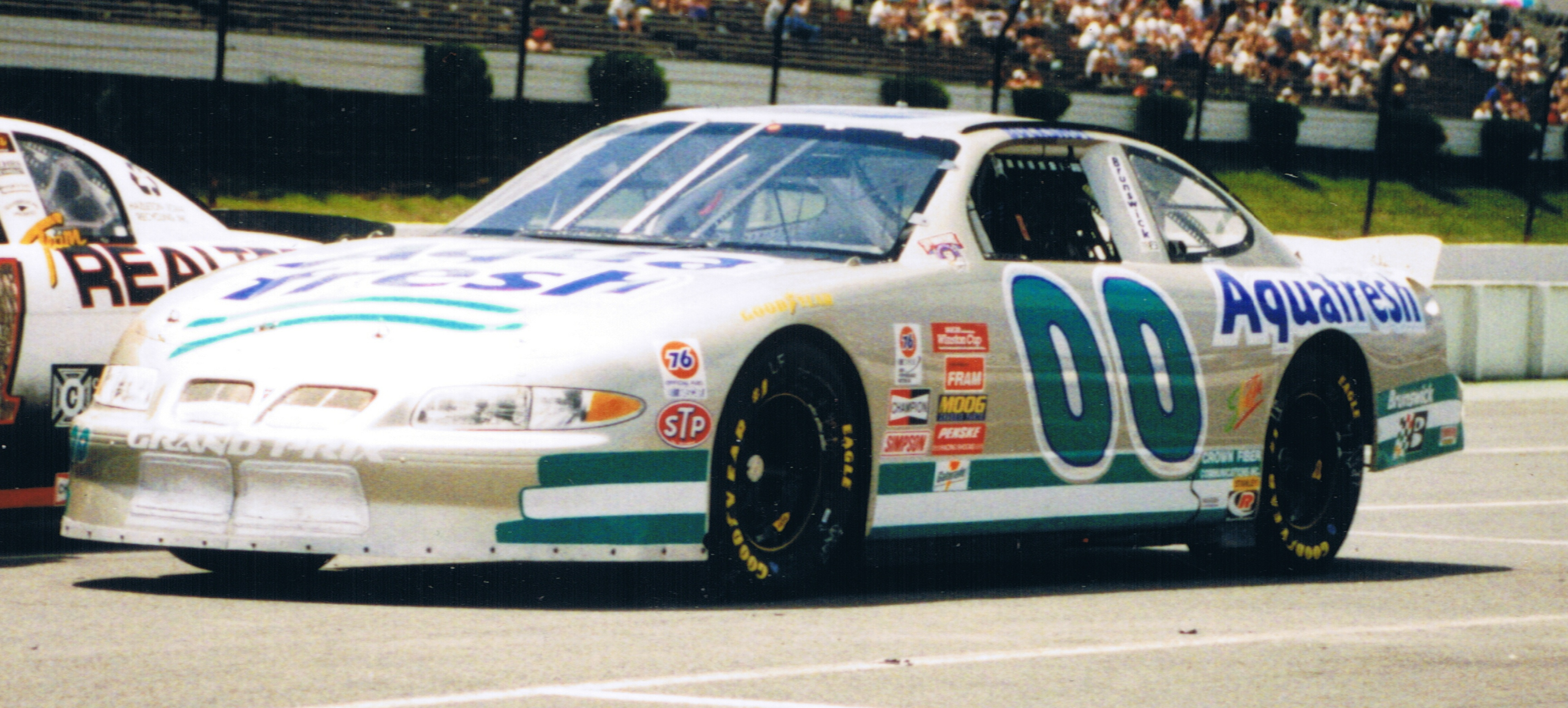
- Jones' 1998 Winston Cup car
- Born: Roy Norris Jones; July 23, 1970 (age 56); Monticello, Georgia, U.S.
- Awards: 1998 NASCAR Busch Series Most Popular Driver

NASCAR Cup Series career
- 56 races run over 7 years
- Best finish: 41st (2001)
- First race: 1997 NAPA 500 (Atlanta)
- Last race: 2003 EA Sports 500 (Talladega)
Wins	Top tens	Poles
0	1	0

NASCAR O'Reilly Auto Parts Series career
- 147 races run over 8 years
- Best finish: 7th (1997)
- First race: 1995 Sears Auto Center 250 (Milwaukee)
- Last race: 2004 Meijer 300 (Kentucky)
- First win: 1996 Sears Auto Center 250 (Milwaukee)
- Last win: 1998 Gumout Long Life Formula 200 (Loudon)
Wins	Top tens	Poles
2	33	3
- Statistics up to date as of November 24, 2012.

Roy Norris "Buckshot" Jones (born July 23, 1970) is an American racing driver who has competed in NASCAR and sprint cars. He most recently ran in the USAR Hooters Pro Cup Series.

== Life and career ==
Jones earned the nickname "Buckshot" from his grandfather after he ran into a table and showed no signs of pain or agony. His racing career began as a hobby during his studies at the University of Georgia, where he earned a business degree. Jones originally wanted to race motocross, but his dad suggested stock cars since they were safer.

After his sixth race, Jones went out to dinner with his father, where he told him that he wanted to be a NASCAR champion. He and his father then developed a six-year plan that would allow Jones to move up the ladder and begin to fulfill his dream.

In 1995, Jones moved to the NASCAR Busch Series with his own team called Buckshot Racing. After a disappointing rookie campaign where his best finish was a ninth at South Boston Speedway, Jones hired Ricky Pearson, son of the legendary David Pearson, as his crew chief. Jones won two races over the next three years, winning the Most Popular Driver award in 1998. In 1999, after marrying his longtime girlfriend Jina, he made the jump to Winston Cup, driving the No. 00 Pontiac, with Ricky's brother Larry Pearson taking over his Busch ride. Crown Fiber Communications was the major sponsor of the car. Jones failed to qualify several times in his rookie year, including the first two races of the season. On the occasions in which he did make the field, a DNF was the typical result. After nine starts, he decided to end his bid for Rookie of the Year and returned to the Busch Series. During his Busch campaign of 2000, he had one pole, three top-tens, and finished 21st in points.

In 2001, Jones returned to the Cup Series, driving the No. 44 Georgia-Pacific Dodge Intrepid for Petty Enterprises. Unfortunately, the season was a struggle. He failed to qualify five times and had ten DNFs, finishing 41st in points with a best result of sixteenth at Talladega in the spring and another sixteenth at Phoenix. Due to a growing family, Jones stopped racing full time in April 2002. After missing the Daytona 500, he was 35th in points after Martinsville, with a best finish of twelfth in his home race at Atlanta. He returned for two races in 2003, finishing seventeenth for Phoenix Racing at Daytona in July, and leading nineteen laps for Michael Waltrip Racing in a career-best performance at Talladega in September before retiring from the race with damage from a blown tire.

Jones has since sold his team and temporarily retired from racing. He last appeared in a NASCAR sanctioned race in 2004, when he ran two Busch Series events. He currently works in land development and real estate in Gwinnett County, Georgia. He returned to auto racing in the Snowball Derby in December 2006 but finished last after being caught in an early accident. In 2007, he returned to racing to drive the No. 00 Chevrolet for DMT Motorsports in the Southern Division of the USAR Hooters Pro Cup Series, but re-retired at the end of the season. In 2015, Jones raced in the third division of the Whelen Modified Tour.

== Motorsports career results ==
=== NASCAR ===
(key) (Bold – Pole position awarded by qualifying time. Italics – Pole position earned by points standings or practice time. * – Most laps led.)

==== Winston Cup Series ====
NASCAR Winston Cup Series results
Year	Team	No.	Make	1	2	3	4	5	6	7	8	9	10	11	12	13	14	15	16	17	18	19	20	21	22	23	24	25	26	27	28	29	30	31	32	33	34	35	36	NWCC	Pts	Ref
1997	Buckshot Racing	00	Pontiac	DAY	CAR	RCH	ATL	DAR	TEX	BRI	MAR	SON	TAL	CLT	DOV	POC	MCH	CAL	DAY	NHA	POC	IND	GLN	MCH	BRI	DAR	RCH	NHA	DOV	MAR	CLT	TAL	CAR	PHO	ATL; 43					70th	34	
1998	Stavola Brothers Racing	8	Chevy	DAY	CAR	LVS	ATL	DAR	BRI	TEX	MAR	TAL	CAL	CLT	DOV; 8	RCH; DNQ	MCH																							52nd	458	
1998	Buckshot Racing	00	Pontiac															POC; DNQ	SON	NHA	POC																			52nd	458	
1998	Stavola Brothers Racing	00	Chevy																			IND; 27	GLN	MCH; 27	BRI	NHA; DNQ	DAR	RCH; DNQ	DOV; 42	MAR	CLT	TAL; 16	DAY	PHO	CAR	ATL				52nd	458	
1999	Buckshot Racing	00	Pontiac	DAY; DNQ	CAR; DNQ	LVS; 29	ATL; 37	DAR; 34	TEX; 35	BRI; 39	MAR; DNQ	TAL; 21	CAL; DNQ	RCH; DNQ	CLT; 29	DOV; DNQ	MCH; DNQ	POC	SON	DAY; 41	NHA	POC	IND; DNQ	GLN	MCH	BRI	DAR	RCH	NHA	DOV	MAR						ATL; 26			45th	676	
1999	No Fear Racing	14	Ford																													CLT; DNQ								45th	676	
1999	Eel River Racing	30	Pontiac																														TAL; 27	CAR	PHO	HOM				45th	676	
2000	Buckshot Racing	00	Pontiac	DAY	CAR	LVS	ATL	DAR	BRI	TEX	MAR	TAL	CAL	RCH	CLT	DOV	MCH	POC	SON	DAY	NHA	POC	IND	GLN	MCH	BRI	DAR	RCH	NHA	DOV	MAR	CLT	TAL	CAR	PHO	HOM	ATL; 37			68th	52	
2001	Petty Enterprises	44	Dodge	DAY; 29	CAR; 35	LVS; 36	ATL; 19	DAR; 41	BRI; 33	TEX; 33	MAR; 38	TAL; 16	CAL; DNQ	RCH; DNQ	CLT; 27	DOV; 26	MCH; 36	POC; 42	SON; 36	DAY; DNQ	CHI; 38	NHA; 24	POC; 39	IND; 36	GLN	MCH; DNQ	BRI; 43	DAR; 35	RCH; 37	DOV; 38	KAN; 31	CLT; DNQ	MAR; 30	TAL; 28	PHO; 16	CAR; 38	HOM; 34	ATL; 33	NHA; 41	41st	1939	
2002	Petty Enterprises	44	Dodge	DAY; DNQ	CAR; 41	LVS; 23	ATL; 12	DAR; 19	BRI; 40	TEX; 26	MAR; 33	TAL	CAL	RCH	CLT	DOV	POC	MCH	SON	DAY	CHI	NHA	POC	IND	GLN	MCH	BRI	DAR	RCH	NHA	DOV	KAN	TAL	CLT	MAR					49th	559	
2002	Michael Waltrip Racing	00	Chevy																																	ATL; DNQ	CAR	PHO	HOM	49th	559	
2003	Phoenix Racing	09	Dodge	DAY	CAR	LVS	ATL	DAR	BRI	TEX	TAL	MAR	CAL	RCH	CLT	DOV	POC	MCH	SON	DAY; 17	CHI	NHA	POC	IND	GLN	MCH	BRI	DAR	RCH	NHA	DOV									62nd	160	
2003	Michael Waltrip Racing	00	Chevy																													TAL; 40	KAN	CLT	MAR	ATL; DNQ	PHO	CAR	HOM	62nd	160	

===== Daytona 500 =====
Year	Team	Manufacturer	Start	Finish
1999	Buckshot Racing	Pontiac	DNQ	
2001	Petty Enterprises	Dodge	29	29
2002	Petty Enterprises	Dodge	DNQ	

==== Busch Series ====
NASCAR Busch Series results
Year	Team	No.	Make	1	2	3	4	5	6	7	8	9	10	11	12	13	14	15	16	17	18	19	20	21	22	23	24	25	26	27	28	29	30	31	32	33	34	NBSC	Pts	Ref
1993				DAY	CAR	RCH	DAR	BRI	HCY	ROU	MAR	NZH	CLT	DOV	MYB	GLN	MLW	TAL	IRP	MCH	NHA	BRI	DAR	RCH	DOV	ROU	CLT	MAR; DNQ	CAR	HCY; DNQ	ATL							NA	-	
1995	Buckshot Racing	00	Ford	DAY	CAR	RCH; DNQ	ATL	NSV	DAR	BRI	HCY	NHA	NZH	CLT	DOV	MYB; DNQ	GLN	MLW; 34	TAL	SBO; 9	IRP; 29	MCH; 16	BRI; 23		RCH; 12	DOV; 11	CLT; DNQ	CAR	HOM; 37									41st	833	
1995	Buckshot Racing	00	Chevy																					DAR; 41														41st	833	
1996	Buckshot Racing	00	Ford	DAY; DNQ	CAR; 37	RCH; 19	ATL; 18	NSV; DNQ	DAR; DNQ	BRI; DNQ	HCY; 24	NZH; 21	CLT; DNQ	DOV; 21	SBO; 23	MYB; 13	GLN; 29	MLW; 1	NHA; 21	TAL; DNQ	IRP; 9	MCH; 27	BRI; 24	DAR; 34	RCH; 33	DOV; 19	CLT; 27		HOM; DNQ									25th	1708	
1996	Buckshot Racing	00	Pontiac																									**CAR**; 37										25th	1708	
1997	Buckshot Racing	00	Pontiac	DAY; 12	CAR; 13	RCH; 13	ATL; 4	LVS; 39	DAR; 6	HCY; 14	TEX; 7	BRI; 10	NSV; 10	TAL; 38	NHA; 41	NZH; 9	CLT; 6	DOV; 17	SBO; 3	GLN; 20	MLW; 4	MYB; 10	GTY; 25	IRP; 7	MCH; 5	BRI; 26	DAR; 32	RCH; 6	DOV; 23		CAL; 40	CAR; 15	HOM; 26					7th	3437	
1997	Buckshot Racing	00	Ford																											CLT; 10								7th	3437	
1998	Buckshot Racing	00	Pontiac	DAY; 4	CAR; 15	LVS; 8	NSV; 13	DAR; 14	BRI; 28*	TEX; 28	HCY; 12	TAL; 4	NHA; 1	NZH; 33	CLT; 29	DOV; 19	RCH; 30	PPR; 18	GLN; 29	MLW; 7	MYB; 15	CAL; 11	SBO; 17	**IRP**; 3	MCH; 14	BRI; 8	DAR; 42	RCH; 36	DOV; 41	CLT; 5	GTY; 31	CAR; 35	ATL; 5	HOM; 16				9th	3453	
1999	Buckshot Racing	00	Pontiac	DAY	CAR	LVS	ATL	DAR	TEX	NSV; 12	BRI	TAL	CAL	NHA; 16	RCH	NZH	CLT	DOV; 22	SBO	GLN; 19	MLW; 16	MYB; 23	PPR; 39	GTY; 40	IRP; 33	MCH; 11	BRI; 35	DAR; 11	RCH; 26	DOV; 10	CLT; 11	CAR; 18	MEM; 36	PHO; 10	HOM; 17			28th	1889	
2000	Buckshot Racing	00	Pontiac	DAY; 8	CAR; 38	LVS; 24	ATL; 36	DAR; 25	BRI; 34	TEX; 26	NSV; 38	TAL; 2							MYB; 31	GLN; 20																		21st	2952	
2000	Buckshot Racing	00	Chevy										CAL; 23	RCH; 26	NHA; 19	CLT; 17	DOV; 23	SBO; 33			MLW; 40	NZH; 25	PPR; 19	GTY; 20	IRP; 29	**MCH**; 40	BRI; 27	DAR; 20	RCH; 26	DOV; 6	CLT; 26	CAR; 17	MEM; 11	PHO; 25	HOM; 16			21st	2952	
2001	Buckshot Racing	00	Chevy	DAY	CAR	LVS	ATL	DAR	BRI	TEX	NSH	TAL	CAL	RCH	NHA	NZH	CLT	DOV; 18	KEN	MLW	GLN	CHI; 7	GTY	PPR	IRP	MCH	BRI	DAR	RCH	DOV	KAN; 8	CLT; 13	MEM	PHO	CAR; 19	HOM; 18		48th	736	
2004	Phoenix Racing	1	Dodge	DAY	CAR	LVS	DAR	BRI	TEX	NSH	TAL	CAL	GTY	RCH	NZH	CLT	DOV	NSH; 29	KEN; 38	MLW	DAY	CHI	NHA	PPR	IRP	MCH	BRI	CAL	RCH	DOV	KAN	CLT	MEM	ATL	PHO	DAR	HOM	107th	125	
