= 2003 Brickyard 400 =

Race details
- Race 21 of 36 in the 2003 NASCAR Winston Cup Series
- 2003 Brickyard 400 program cover
- Date: August 3, 2003
- Official name: Brickyard 400
- Location: Indianapolis Motor Speedway in Speedway, Indiana
- Course: Permanent racing facility
- Course length: 2.5 miles (4.023 km)
- Distance: 160 laps, 400 mi (643.738 km)
- Weather: Warm with temperatures approaching 80.1 °F (26.7 °C); wind speeds up to 13.8 miles per hour (22.2 km/h)
- Average speed: 134.554 miles per hour (216.544 km/h)

Pole position
Driver	Kevin Harvick	Richard Childress Racing
- Time: 48.822

Most laps led
Driver	Tony Stewart	Joe Gibbs Racing
- Laps: 60

Winner
No. 29	Kevin Harvick	Richard Childress Racing

Television in the United States
- Network: NBC
- Announcers: Allen Bestwick, Wally Dallenbach Jr. and Benny Parsons
- Nielsen ratings: 6.1/15 (9.3 million)

The 2003 Brickyard 400, the 10th running of the event, was a NASCAR Winston Cup Series race held on August 3, 2003, at Indianapolis Motor Speedway in Speedway, Indiana. Contested over 160 laps on the 2.5-mile (4.0-kilometre) speedway, it was the twenty-first race of the 2003 NASCAR Winston Cup Series season. Kevin Harvick of Richard Childress Racing won the race.

Kevin Harvick became the first driver to win the race from the pole position.

== Background ==
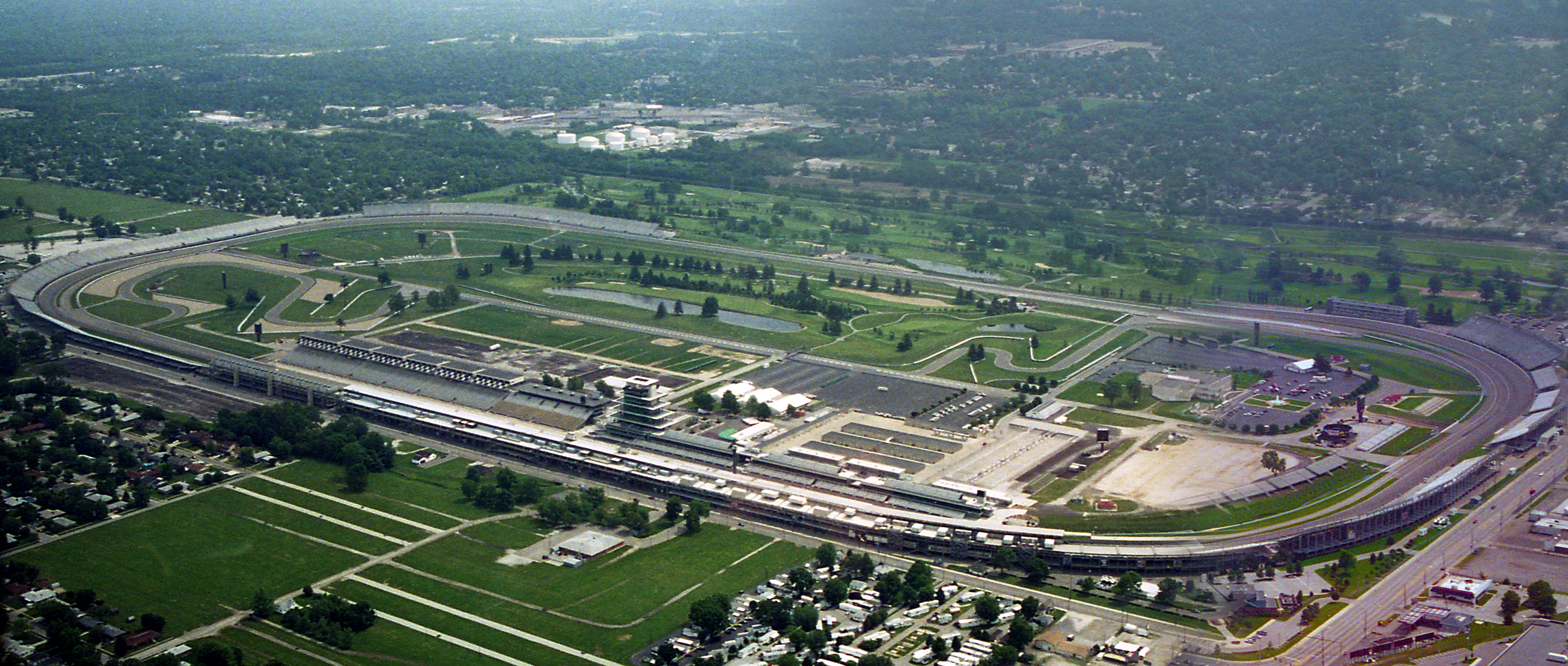
Indianapolis Motor Speedway, the track where the race was held.

The Indianapolis Motor Speedway, located in Speedway, Indiana, (an enclave suburb of Indianapolis) in the United States, is the home of the Indianapolis 500 and the Brickyard 400. It is located on the corner of 16th Street and Georgetown Road, approximately 6 miles (9.7 kilometres) west of Downtown Indianapolis. It is a four-turn rectangular-oval track that is 2.5 miles (4.0 kilometres) long. The track's turns are banked at 9 degrees, while the front stretch, the location of the finish line, has no banking. The back stretch, opposite of the front, also has a zero degree banking. The racetrack has seats for more than 250,000 spectators.

== Race results ==
Pos	No.	Driver	Team	Manufacturer
1	29	Kevin Harvick	Richard Childress Racing	Chevrolet
2	17	Matt Kenseth	Roush Racing	Ford
3	42	Jamie McMurray (R)	Chip Ganassi Racing	Dodge
4	24	Jeff Gordon	Hendrick Motorsports	Chevrolet
5	9	Bill Elliott	Evernham Motorsports	Dodge
6	31	Robby Gordon	Richard Childress Racing	Chevrolet
7	97	Kurt Busch	Roush Racing	Ford
8	7	Jimmy Spencer	Ultra Motorsports	Dodge
9	6	Mark Martin	Roush Racing	Ford
10	2	Rusty Wallace	Penske Racing	Dodge
11	12	Ryan Newman	Penske Racing	Dodge
12	20	Tony Stewart	Joe Gibbs Racing	Chevrolet
13	10	Johnny Benson	MB2 Motorsports	Pontiac
14	8	Dale Earnhardt Jr.	Dale Earnhardt Inc.	Chevrolet
15	30	Steve Park	Richard Childress Racing	Chevrolet
16	15	Michael Waltrip	Dale Earnhardt Inc.	Chevrolet
17	32	Ricky Craven	PPI Motorsports	Pontiac
18	48	Jimmie Johnson	Hendrick Motorsports	Chevrolet
19	5	Terry Labonte	Hendrick Motorsports	Chevrolet
20	1	Jeff Green	Dale Earnhardt Inc.	Chevrolet
21	16	Greg Biffle (R)	Roush Racing	Ford
22	18	Bobby Labonte	Joe Gibbs Racing	Chevrolet
23	54	Todd Bodine	BelCar Motorsports	Ford
24	23	Kenny Wallace	Bill Davis Racing	Dodge
25	74	Tony Raines (R)	BACE Motorsports	Chevrolet
26	22	Ward Burton	Bill Davis Racing	Dodge
27	99	Jeff Burton	Roush Racing	Ford
28	77	Dave Blaney	Jasper Motorsports	Ford
29	41	Casey Mears (R)	Chip Ganassi Racing	Chevrolet
30	57	Kevin Lepage	CLR Racing	Ford
31	91	Casey Atwood	Evernham Motorsports	Dodge
32	14	Larry Foyt (R)	A. J. Foyt Racing	Dodge
33	0	Jason Leffler	Haas CNC Racing	Pontiac
34	40	Sterling Marlin	Chip Ganassi Racing	Dodge
35	01	Mike Skinner	MB2 Motorsports	Pontiac
36	37	Derrike Cope	Quest Motor Racing	Chevrolet
37	25	Joe Nemechek	Hendrick Motorsports	Chevrolet
38	21	Ricky Rudd	Wood Brothers Racing	Ford
39	88	Dale Jarrett	Robert Yates Racing	Ford
40	45	Kyle Petty	Petty Enterprises	Dodge
41	19	Jeremy Mayfield	Evernham Motorsports	Dodge
42	38	Elliott Sadler	Robert Yates Racing	Ford
43	81	John Andretti	Dale Earnhardt Inc.	Chevrolet

=== Failed to Qualify ===
- 11 - Brett Bodine (final NASCAR race for Brett Bodine Racing)
- 79 - Billy Bigley (R)
- 49 - Ken Schrader
- 71 - Jim Sauter
- 43 - Christian Fittipaldi (R)
- 04 - David Reutimann
- 07 - Ted Musgrave
- 02 - Hermie Sadler
- 4 - Robert Pressley
- 89 - Morgan Shepherd (withdrew)

=== Race statistics ===
- Time of race: 2:58:22
- Average speed: 134.554 miles per hour (216.544 km/h)
- Pole speed: 184.343 miles per hour (296.671 km/h)
- Cautions: 5 for 25 laps
- Margin of victory: 2.758 seconds
- Lead changes: 17
- Percent of race run under caution: 15.6%
- Average green flag run: 22.5 laps
