= Jason Leffler =

American racing driver (1975-2013)

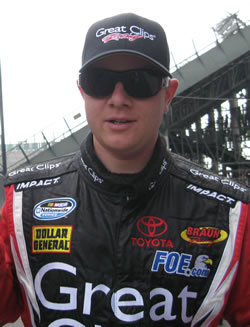
- Leffler at the circuit Autódromo Hermanos Rodríguez in 2008
- Born: Jason Charles Leffler; September 16, 1975; Long Beach, California, U.S.
- Died: June 12, 2013 (aged 37); Chester, Pennsylvania, U.S.
- Cause of death: Blunt force neck injury from racing accident
- Height: 5 ft 3 in (1.60 m)
- Weight: 130 lb (59 kg)
- Achievements: 1997, 1998, 1999 USAC National Midget Series Champion; 1998 USAC Silver Crown Series Champion; 2002 Hoosier Hundred Winner; 1999, 2005 Turkey Night Grand Prix Winner; 1997 Belleville Midget Nationals Winner
- Awards: National Midget Auto Racing Hall of Fame inductee (2003); West Coast Stock Car Hall of Fame (2015); USAC Hall of Fame inductee (2018)

NASCAR Cup Series career
- 73 races run over 9 years
- 2013 position: 52nd
- Best finish: 37th (2001)
- First race: 2001 Daytona 500 (Daytona)
- Last race: 2013 Party in the Poconos 400 (Pocono)
| Wins | Top tens | Poles |
|---|---|---|
| 0 | 1 | 1 |

NASCAR O'Reilly Auto Parts Series career
- 294 races run over 12 years
- Best finish: 3rd (2007)
- First race: 1999 Kroger 200 (IRP)
- Last race: 2012 Great Clips 200 (Phoenix)
- First win: 2004 Federated Auto Parts 300 (Nashville)
- Last win: 2007 Kroger 200 (IRP)
| Wins | Top tens | Poles |
|---|---|---|
| 2 | 107 | 8 |

NASCAR FedEx Freight Truck Series career
- 56 races run over 7 years
- Best finish: 4th (2002)
- First race: 2000 Power Stroke 200 (IRP)
- Last race: 2012 Ford EcoBoost 200 (Homestead)
- First win: 2003 MBNA Armed Forces Family 200 (Dover)
| Wins | Top tens | Poles |
|---|---|---|
| 1 | 35 | 10 |

IndyCar Series career
- 3 races run over 2 years
- Best finish: 30th (2000)
- First race: 1999 Transworld Diversified Services 200 (Disney)
- Last race: 2000 Indianapolis 500 (Indy)
| Wins | Podiums | Poles |
|---|---|---|
| 0 | 0 | 0 |

Jason Charles Leffler (September 16, 1975 – June 12, 2013), nicknamed "LEFturn", was an American professional open-wheel and stock car racing driver. Leffler began racing in the open-wheel ranks, competing in the 2000 Indianapolis 500 before moving to primarily NASCAR competition. He died from injuries sustained in a 410 sprint car race at Bridgeport Speedway in Bridgeport, New Jersey.

== Racing career ==
=== Open wheel career ===
Leffler began his career racing midget cars in the USAC series, where he won three consecutive midget championships from 1997 and 1999, as well as the Silver Crown series championship in 1998. He was the third driver to win three consecutive midget car championships. He won the Hut Hundred and Belleville Nationals in 1997, and the Turkey Night Grand Prix and Copper Classic in 1999. He won his second Turkey Night Grand Prix in 2005.

Roger Penske met Leffler at the 1998 Hut 100. Leffler's success also caught the attention of Joe Gibbs Racing, a team which had previously signed Tony Stewart from the USAC ranks. Leffler joined the team in 1999 and made four starts in the Busch Series during the season with moderate success. At the same time, he also started a race in the Indy Racing League at Walt Disney World Speedway in the No. 5 Treadway Racing machine, but finished last after crashing early in the race.

Leffler made his first, and only, start in the Indianapolis 500 in 2000. This effort was put forth by Treadway Racing with backing from Roger Penske's United Auto group. Leffler qualified in the seventeenth position, which was also where he finished.

=== NASCAR career ===
During the 2000 season, Leffler drove full-time for the No. 18 MBNA sponsored Joe Gibbs Racing team in the Busch Series. He finished twentieth in the final standings, earned three pole positions during the year, and finished second at Phoenix. He also made two IRL starts, among them a start for Treadway in the Indianapolis 500 where he started and finished seventeenth. After that season he moved up to the Winston Cup Series to become the driver of the No. 01 Cingular Wireless Dodge for Chip Ganassi Racing as the permanent replacement for Kenny Irwin Jr., who was killed in a practice crash while driving for the same team at New Hampshire in 2000. Leffler's car retained sponsorship from BellSouth through its Cingular Wireless property, and with Ganassi's purchase of a stake in Felix Sabates' former team came a switch in manufacturer as Leffler became one of several drivers to drive Dodge Intrepids in the brand's return to NASCAR. It was a controversial decision, as Leffler performed poorly the season prior in excellent Joe Gibbs equipment in the Busch series. During his inaugural Cup season, he had only one top-ten finish and four failures to qualify. He was, however, the inaugural pole setter at Kansas Speedway. After his 37th-place finish in the 2001 championship, Ganassi replaced him with Jimmy Spencer for the 2002 season and remade Leffler's former car into the No. 41 Target Dodge.

Leffler joined Ultra Motorsports in 2002 to drive the No. 2 Carquest/Team ASE Dodge Ram in place of the departed Scott Riggs and had great success early on with the team. In his first year, he tied a single season Craftsman Truck Series record by scoring eight pole positions, and qualified no worse than eighth at any race during the season. Despite not winning a race, he had six second-place finishes and a fourth-place finish in the championship. He also won the Night Before the 500 midget race and got to drive Ultra's No. 7 car in the final two races of the Cup Series season after the team fired Casey Atwood. Leffler finally broke through in 2003 when he scored his first career victory at Dover.

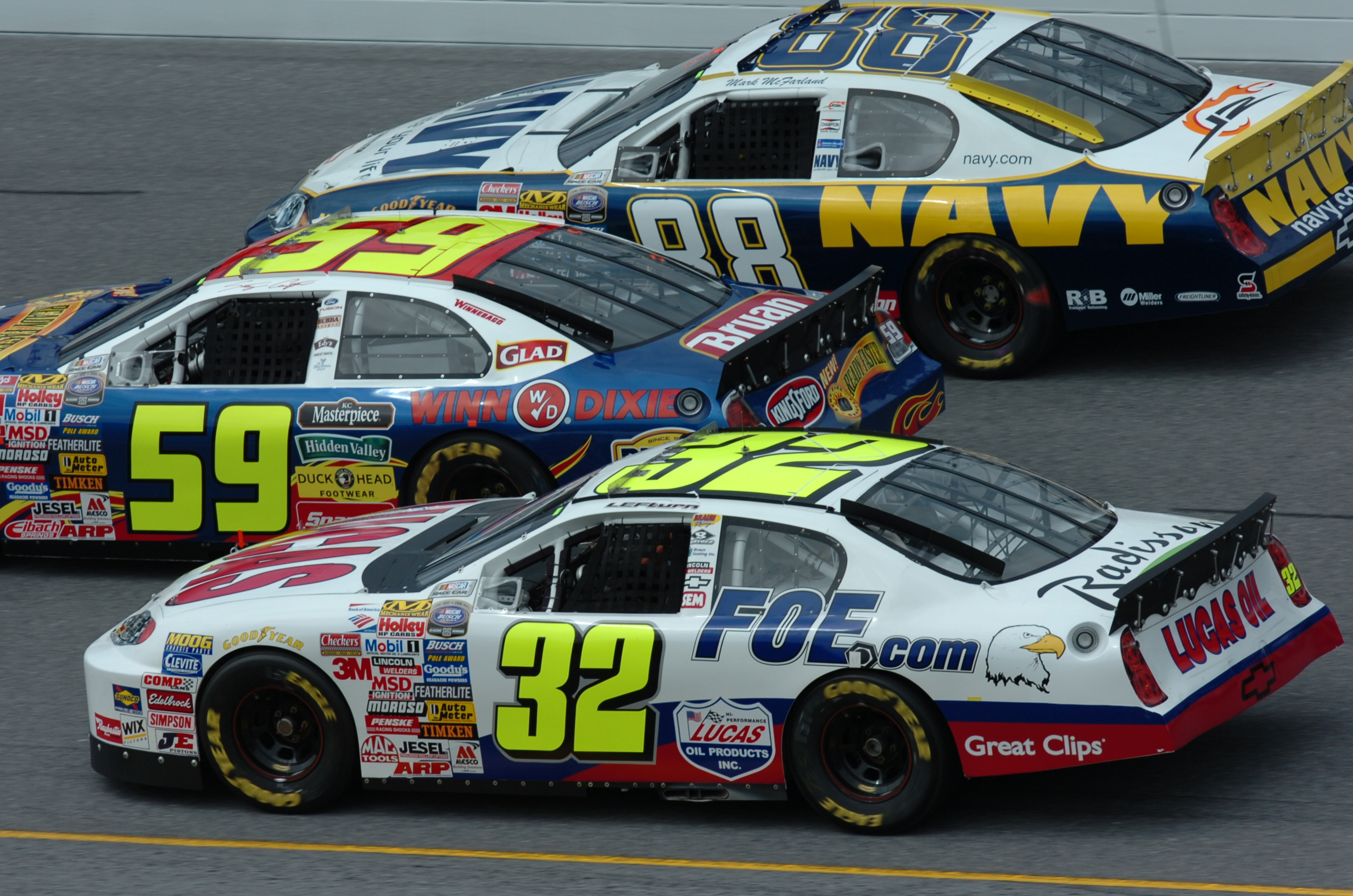
Leffler in the No. 32, racing at Daytona in 2006

Despite the success, Leffler ended up losing his ride at Ultra in a controversial fashion. Haas CNC Racing, which was fielding its first full-time Cup Series team, had fired its driver Jack Sprague after the Tropicana 400. Team owner Gene Haas named John Andretti as his replacement, but he was unavailable for the Brickyard 400 due to a prior commitment with Dale Earnhardt, Inc. Haas approached Leffler to drive the No. 0 NetZero Pontiac Grand Prix in the race and he agreed to do so. Ultra, which had warned Leffler that such a move would be in violation of his contract, responded by firing him.

Leffler made ten starts in the No. 0, becoming the permanent driver after the Sirius Satellite Radio at the Glen. The team then signed Ward Burton away from Bill Davis Racing to take over the car, and he joined the team before the season was over to get a head start. Leffler was moved to the No. 00 Haas Automation car in the Busch Series for the remainder of 2003, with the idea that he would remain there for 2004. At Nashville Superspeedway in 2004, Leffler scored his first career Busch Series victory. He also was involved in a controversial finish at the Winn-Dixie 250; he was penalized by NASCAR for "over-aggressive driving" on the final lap, that saw Michael Waltrip get spun, and then Dale Earnhardt Jr. get wrecked, both by Leffler. He was running third in the points when the team released him from his contract. He ended up finishing twelfth in the championship despite missing the last seven races.

Shortly after his dismissal, Leffler signed a deal to re-join Joe Gibbs Racing for 2005, taking over a newly created Cup team sponsored by FedEx. The No. 11 Chevrolet was regularly outside of the top-35 in points, meaning that it was not guaranteed a starting spot for all races; Leffler was unable to qualify for the Coca-Cola 600 because of it. He was replaced by Terry Labonte for the two road-course races and, eventually, was fired from JGR after nineteen starts in which he failed to record a top-ten finish. He was replaced by a mix of Labonte and JGR developmental drivers J. J. Yeley and Denny Hamlin, the latter of whom took over the car full-time the following season.

While racing with Gibbs, Leffler briefly raced with Braun Racing in the Busch Series, a team that had lost their regular driver, Shane Hmiel, to a drug suspension. After leaving Gibbs, Leffler joined Braun Racing on a full-time basis for the remainder of the season. Leffler had scored four top-ten finishes with Braun in nine starts for the team.

For the 2006 season, Leffler was signed to return to Braun Racing to drive the No. 32 Chevrolet. The team carried sponsorships from Lucas Oil, Fraternal Order of Eagles, and ABF U-Pack Moving. The No. 32 team became the No. 38 team with sponsorship from Great Clips after it merged with Akins Motorsports. Jason also attempted to qualify for the second to last race of the chase at Phoenix in the No. 71 for Braun Racing but failed to qualify. He also owned the 2006 USAC Silver Crown championship team.

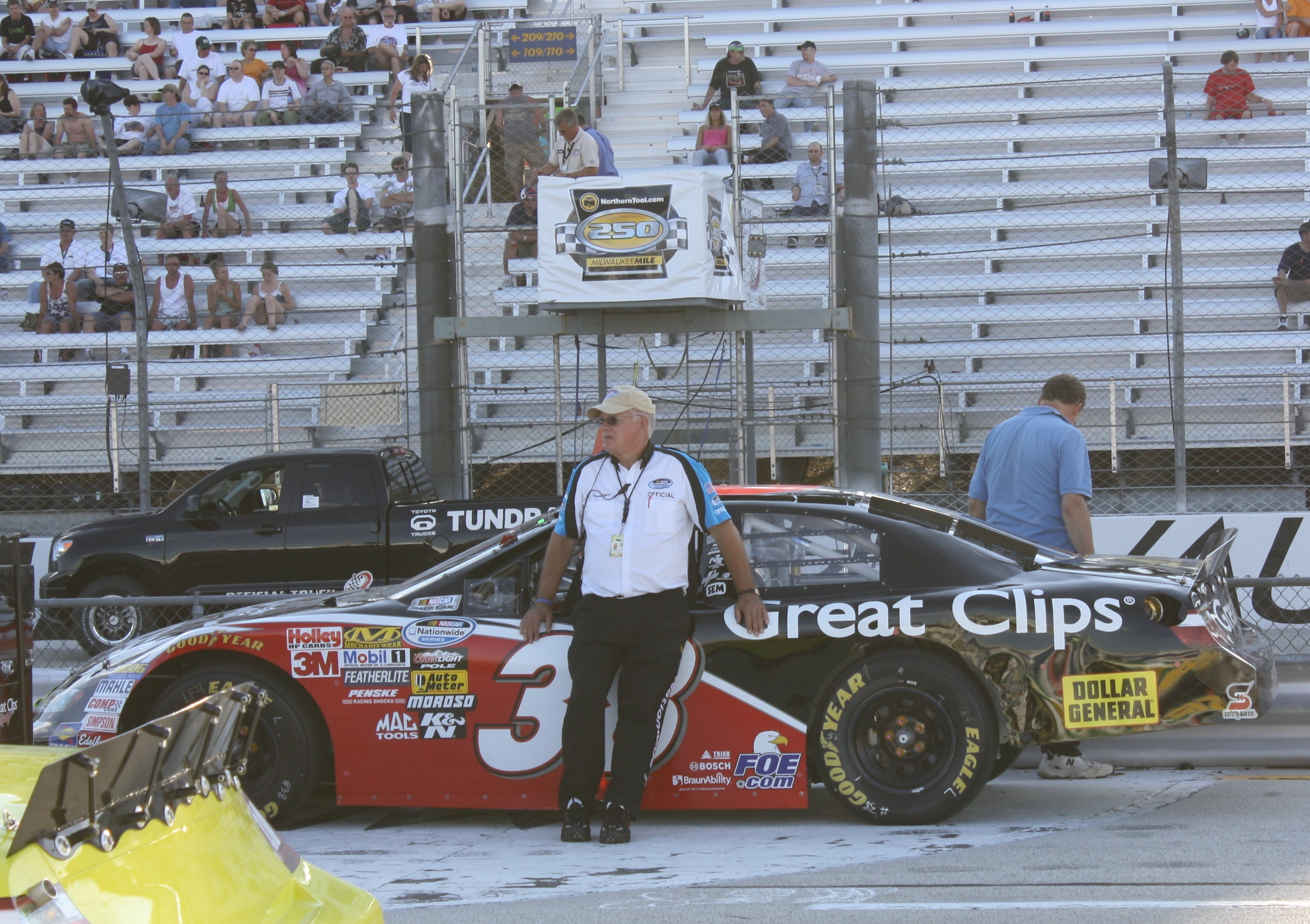
Leffler's No. 38 in 2009

During the 2007 season, Leffler won the pole for the Winn-Dixie 250 at Daytona International Speedway. He finished ninth. Leffler would make NASCAR history on July 28, 2007, as he passed Greg Biffle with two laps remaining to win the Busch Series Kroger 200 at O'Reilly Raceway Park. The win marked the first race victory for a Toyota Camry in Busch Series competition, and the first win for a foreign manufacturer in a top-tier NASCAR series since Al Keller won in a Jaguar in 1954. The win also marked Leffler's second career Busch Series win and first win since the 2004 season. Leffler would finish the 2007 season third in the points standings, the highest of the Busch regulars. Leffler returned to Sprint Cup in 2008 for a few races in the No. 70 Haas CNC Chevy while driving full-time for Braun Racing's No. 38 Toyota Camry in the Nationwide Series.

In 2009 at the July Daytona race weekend, it was announced that the No. 38 Toyota car would be shared with Kasey Kahne for the 2010 NASCAR Nationwide Series season. Leffler still drove full-time, as he would pilot the No. 10 Toyota in races Kahne was in the No. 38. On September 25, 2010, Braun Racing's Nationwide operations were acquired by Turner Motorsports. Leffler continued driving full-time in the Great Clips No. 38 for TMS in 2010 and 2011 with select races in the No. 10 and 30. In late 2011, he was informed that he was free to pursue other opportunities for the 2012 season. During the second-to-last race of the 2011 NASCAR Nationwide Series season at Phoenix International Raceway, Leffler was racing with Elliott Sadler, who was seventeen points back of first place in the standings coming into the race, and Aric Almirola for tenth when Leffler bumped into the rear bumper of Sadler in turn 3 turning Sadler around and collecting himself, Almirola, Jeremy Clements, and Morgan Shepherd. The wreck ended up costing Sadler the championship as Sadler lost the championship by 45 points to Ricky Stenhouse Jr. Leffler in his interview took full responsibility for what happened between him and Sadler saying that it was his own fault.

On January 9, 2012, Kyle Busch Motorsports announced that Leffler would drive the No. 18 truck for fourteen races with sponsorship from Dollar General. However, strings of bad luck and poor finishes plagued the team, and Leffler was released on August 14.

Leffler also returned to the Cup Series in 2012, driving for Robinson-Blakeney Racing at Watkins Glen International, and for Humphrey Smith Racing at Michigan International Speedway.

Leffler made a single Cup Series start in 2013, driving Humphrey Smith Racing's No. 19 Toyota Camry at Pocono Raceway in early June, three days before his death; he started and parked, finishing 43rd in the event.

== Death ==
On June 12, 2013, at 8:30 PM, Leffler was involved in a crash during a 410 sprint car heat race at the 5/8-mile (1.0 km) Bridgeport Motorsports Park in Logan Township, New Jersey. Running second with a few laps left, his car suffered a front suspension failure, causing it to crash into a wall and flip several times.

Leffler instantly lost consciousness in the accident. When it was found that Leffler was not breathing, the rest of the race was cancelled and victory lane ceremonies did not take place. He was transported by ambulance to Crozer-Chester Medical Center in Chester, Pennsylvania, where he was pronounced dead at 9:00 PM EDT, thirty minutes after the accident. An autopsy report stated that the cause of death was a severe blunt force neck and spine injury.

After his death, many drivers and racing associations such as NASCAR and IndyCar made statements on the death and gave their condolences. NASCAR drivers competing in the 2013 Quicken Loans 400 had special stickers placed on their cars in honor of Leffler. Denny Hamlin, who replaced Leffler in the No. 11 FedEx Chevrolet in late 2005 had his car repainted to resemble Leffler's livery. It was one of the first driver memorial throwbacks during a season.

== Personal life ==
Leffler was the son of Charles and Patricia Leffler. Leffler had a son with Alison East, Charlie Dean, who was five years old at the time of his father's death. He was a native of Long Beach, California. He shared his life with live-in girlfriend Julianna Patterson; they resided in North Carolina.

== Career awards ==
Leffler was inducted into the National Midget Auto Racing Hall of Fame in 2003. He had 19 USAC national championship midget car wins at that time. He was inducted in the USAC Hall of Fame in 2018. He also had six USAC Silver Crown wins.

The Jason Leffler Memorial was held in Illinois from 2014 to 2023 on the USAC midget championship, and was held in California at Kern Raceway in 2025. For the first event in Leffler's home state, son Charlie presented the winner's trophy.

== Motorsports career results ==
=== American open-wheel racing ===
(key) (Races in bold indicate pole position) (Races in italics indicate fastest lap)

==== IndyCar Series ====
IndyCar Series results
| Year | Team | No. | Chassis | Engine | 1 | 2 | 3 | 4 | 5 | 6 | 7 | 8 | 9 | 10 | 11 | Rank | Points | Ref |
|---|---|---|---|---|---|---|---|---|---|---|---|---|---|---|---|---|---|---|
| 1999 | Treadway Racing | 5 | G-Force | Oldsmobile | WDW; 28 | PHX | CLT | INDY | TXS | PPIR | ATL | DOV | PP2 | LVS | TX2 | 48th | 2 | |
| 2000 | Treadway Racing | 55 | G-Force | Oldsmobile | WDW | PHX | LVS; 15 | | | | | | | | | 30th | 28 | |
| 2000 | Treadway Racing | 50 | G-Force | Oldsmobile | | | | INDY; 17 | TXS | PPIR | ATL | KTY | TX2 | | | 30th | 28 | |

==== Indianapolis 500 ====
| Year | Chassis | Engine | Start | Finish | Team |
|---|---|---|---|---|---|
| 2000 | G-Force | Oldsmobile | 17 | 17 | Treadway Racing |

=== NASCAR ===
(key) (Bold – Pole position awarded by qualifying time. Italics – Pole position earned by points standings or practice time. * – Most laps led.)

==== Sprint Cup Series ====
NASCAR Sprint Cup Series results
| Year | Team | No. | Make | 1 | 2 | 3 | 4 | 5 | 6 | 7 | 8 | 9 | 10 | 11 | 12 | 13 | 14 | 15 | 16 | 17 | 18 | 19 | 20 | 21 | 22 | 23 | 24 | 25 | 26 | 27 | 28 | 29 | 30 | 31 | 32 | 33 | 34 | 35 | 36 | NSCC | Pts | Ref |
|---|---|---|---|---|---|---|---|---|---|---|---|---|---|---|---|---|---|---|---|---|---|---|---|---|---|---|---|---|---|---|---|---|---|---|---|---|---|---|---|---|---|---|
| 2001 | Chip Ganassi Racing | 01 | Dodge | DAY; 34 | CAR; 33 | LVS; 28 | ATL; 32 | DAR; 39 | BRI; DNQ | TEX; 17 | MAR; DNQ | TAL; 20 | CAL; 18 | RCH; 26 | CLT; 30 | DOV; 13 | MCH; 19 | POC; 41 | | DAY; 24 | CHI; 24 | NHA; 27 | POC; 21 | IND; 26 | GLN | MCH; 24 | BRI; 30 | DAR; 43 | RCH; 28 | DOV; DNQ | **KAN**; 28 | CLT; 43 | MAR; 37 | TAL; 15 | PHO; 41 | CAR; 30 | HOM; 10 | ATL; DNQ | NHA; 30 | 37th | 2413 | |
| 2001 | Chip Ganassi Racing | 04 | Dodge | | | | | | | | | | | | | | | | SON; DNQ | | | | | | | | | | | | | | | | | | | | | 37th | 2413 | |
| 2002 | Ultra Motorsports | 7 | Dodge | DAY | CAR | LVS | ATL | DAR | BRI | TEX | MAR | TAL | CAL | RCH | CLT | DOV | POC | MCH | SON | DAY | CHI | NHA | POC | IND | GLN | MCH | BRI | DAR | RCH | NHA | DOV | KAN | TAL | CLT | MAR | ATL | CAR | PHO; 31 | HOM; 35 | 63rd | 128 | |
| 2003 | Haas CNC Racing | 0 | Pontiac | DAY | CAR | LVS | ATL | DAR | BRI | TEX | TAL | MAR | CAL | RCH | CLT | DOV | POC | MCH | SON | DAY | CHI | NHA | POC | IND; 33 | GLN | MCH; 35 | BRI; 26 | DAR; 26 | RCH; 28 | NHA; 27 | DOV; 25 | TAL; DNQ | KAN; 30 | CLT; 35 | MAR; 27 | ATL | PHO | CAR | HOM | 47th | 764 | |
| 2004 | Haas CNC Racing | 60 | Chevy | DAY | CAR | LVS | ATL | DAR | BRI | TEX | MAR | TAL | CAL | RCH | CLT | DOV | POC | MCH | SON | DAY | CHI | NHA | POC | IND; 43 | GLN | MCH | BRI | CAL | RCH | NHA | DOV | TAL | KAN | CLT | MAR | ATL | PHO | DAR | HOM | 88th | 34 | |
| 2005 | Joe Gibbs Racing | 11 | Chevy | DAY; 36 | CAL; 37 | LVS; 22 | ATL; 25 | BRI; 38 | MAR; 12 | TEX; 36 | PHO; 29 | TAL; 26 | DAR; 38 | RCH; 25 | CLT; DNQ | DOV; 20 | POC; 40 | MCH; 20 | SON | DAY; 18 | CHI; 20 | NHA; 24 | POC; 24 | IND; 33 | GLN | MCH | BRI | CAL | RCH | NHA | DOV | TAL | KAN | CLT | MAR | ATL | TEX | PHO | HOM | 38th | 1538 | |
| 2006 | Braun Racing | 71 | Chevy | DAY | CAL | LVS | ATL | BRI | MAR | TEX | PHO | TAL | RCH | DAR | CLT | DOV | POC | MCH | SON | DAY | CHI | NHA | POC | IND | GLN | MCH | BRI | CAL | RCH | NHA | DOV | KAN | TAL | CLT | MAR | ATL | TEX | PHO; DNQ | HOM | NA | - | |
| 2008 | Haas CNC Racing | 70 | Chevy | DAY | CAL | LVS | ATL | BRI | MAR | TEX | PHO | TAL | RCH | DAR | CLT | DOV; DNQ | POC; 40 | MCH; DNQ | SON | NHA | DAY | CHI; 27 | IND; 32 | POC | GLN | MCH | BRI | CAL | RCH | NHA | DOV | KAN | TAL | CLT | MAR | ATL | TEX | PHO | HOM | 59th | 192 | |
| 2010 | Braun Racing | 32 | Toyota | DAY | CAL | LVS | ATL | BRI | MAR | PHO | TEX | TAL | RCH | DAR | DOV | CLT | POC | MCH | SON | NHA | DAY | CHI | IND | POC | GLN | MCH | BRI | ATL; DNQ | RCH; 43 | NHA | DOV | | | | | | | | | 70th | 68 | |
| 2010 | Prism Motorsports | 66 | Toyota | | | | | | | | | | | | | | | | | | | | | | | | | | | | | KAN; DNQ | CAL; 43 | CLT; DNQ | MAR | TAL | TEX | PHO; DNQ | HOM | 70th | 68 | |
| 2012 | Robinson-Blakeney Racing | 49 | Toyota | DAY | PHO | LVS | BRI | CAL | MAR | TEX | KAN | RCH | TAL | DAR | CLT | DOV | POC | MCH | SON | KEN | DAY | NHA | IND | POC | GLN; 35 | | BRI; 31 | ATL; 38 | RCH | CHI; DNQ | NHA; DNQ | DOV; DNQ | TAL | CLT | KAN | MAR | TEX | | | 71st | 0^{1} | |
| 2012 | Humphrey Smith Racing | 19 | Ford | | | | | | | | | | | | | | | | | | | | | | | MCH; 43 | | | | | | | | | | | | | | 71st | 0^{1} | |
| 2012 | Humphrey Smith Racing | 91 | Chevy | | | | | | | | | | | | | | | | | | | | | | | | | | | | | | | | | | | PHO; 43 | | 71st | 0^{1} | |
| 2012 | Humphrey Smith Racing | 91 | Toyota | | | | | | | | | | | | | | | | | | | | | | | | | | | | | | | | | | | | HOM; DNQ | 71st | 0^{1} | |
| 2013 | Humphrey Smith Racing | 19 | Toyota | DAY | PHO | LVS | BRI | CAL | MAR | TEX | KAN | RCH | TAL | DAR | CLT | DOV | POC; 43 | MCH | SON | KEN | DAY | NHA | IND | POC | GLN | MCH | BRI | ATL | RCH | CHI | NHA | DOV | KAN | CLT | TAL | MAR | TEX | PHO | HOM | 52nd | 1 | |

===== Daytona 500 =====
| Year | Team | Manufacturer | Start | Finish |
|---|---|---|---|---|
| 2001 | Chip Ganassi Racing | Dodge | 15 | 34 |
| 2005 | Joe Gibbs Racing | Chevrolet | 40 | 36 |

==== Nationwide Series ====
NASCAR Nationwide Series results
| Year | Team | No. | Make | 1 | 2 | 3 | 4 | 5 | 6 | 7 | 8 | 9 | 10 | 11 | 12 | 13 | 14 | 15 | 16 | 17 | 18 | 19 | 20 | 21 | 22 | 23 | 24 | 25 | 26 | 27 | 28 | 29 | 30 | 31 | 32 | 33 | 34 | 35 | NNSC | Pts | Ref |
|---|---|---|---|---|---|---|---|---|---|---|---|---|---|---|---|---|---|---|---|---|---|---|---|---|---|---|---|---|---|---|---|---|---|---|---|---|---|---|---|---|---|
| 1999 | Joe Gibbs Racing | 18 | Pontiac | DAY | CAR | LVS | ATL | DAR | TEX | NSV | BRI | TAL | CAL | NHA | RCH | NZH | CLT | DOV | SBO | GLN | MLW | MYB | PPR | GTY | IRP; 41 | MCH | BRI | DAR | RCH; 22 | DOV; DNQ | CLT | CAR; 24 | MEM; 20 | PHO | HOM | | | | 74th | 331 | |
| 2000 | Joe Gibbs Racing | 18 | Pontiac | DAY; 20 | CAR; 19 | LVS; 28 | ATL; DNQ | DAR; 37 | BRI; 25 | **TEX**; 22 | NSV; 21 | TAL; 28 | CAL; 39 | RCH; 35 | NHA; 24 | CLT; 21 | DOV; 28 | SBO; 32 | MYB; 7 | GLN; 28 | MLW; 15 | NZH; 15 | PPR; 24 | GTY; 15 | **IRP**; 4 | MCH; 41 | BRI; 36 | DAR; 28 | RCH; 15 | DOV; 10 | CLT; 36 | CAR; 30 | MEM; 16 | **PHO**; 2 | HOM; 12 | | | | 20th | 2956 | |
| 2003 | Haas CNC Racing | 00 | Chevy | DAY | CAR | LVS | DAR | BRI | TEX | TAL | NSH | CAL | RCH | GTY | NZH | CLT | DOV | NSH | KEN | MLW | DAY | CHI | NHA | PPR | IRP | MCH | BRI | DAR | RCH | DOV | KAN; 16 | CLT; 11 | MEM | ATL; 22 | PHO; 11 | CAR; 22 | HOM; 4 | | 52nd | 739 | |
| 2004 | Haas CNC Racing | 00 | Chevy | DAY; 8 | CAR; 32 | LVS; 22 | DAR; 14 | BRI; 32 | TEX; 6 | NSH; 9 | TAL; 5 | **CAL**; 34 | GTY; 6 | RCH; 11 | NZH; 7 | CLT; 4 | DOV; 14 | NSH; 1* | KEN; 7 | MLW; 15 | DAY; 13 | CHI; 7 | NHA; 3 | PPR; 3 | IRP; 3 | MCH; 7 | BRI; 17 | CAL; 10 | RCH; 4 | DOV; 4 | KAN | CLT | MEM | ATL | PHO | DAR | HOM | | 12th | 3661 | |
| 2005 | Braun Racing | 32 | Chevy | DAY | CAL | MXC | LVS | ATL | NSH | BRI | TEX | PHO | TAL | DAR | RCH | CLT | DOV | NSH | KEN | MLW | DAY; 9 | CHI; 23 | NHA; 29 | PPR | GTY; 18 | IRP | GLN | MCH; 14 | BRI; 20 | CAL; 7 | RCH; 5 | DOV; 3 | KAN; 19 | CLT; 6 | MEM; 24 | TEX; 8 | PHO; 7 | HOM; 27 | 30th | 1829 | |
| 2006 | Braun Racing | 32 | Chevy | DAY; 6 | CAL; 22 | MXC; 17 | LVS; 11 | ATL; 6 | BRI; 32 | TEX; 17 | NSH; 35 | **PHO**; 22* | | | | | | | | | | | | | | | | | | | | | | | | | | | 13th | 3554 | |
| 2006 | Braun Racing | 38 | Chevy | | | | | | | | | | TAL; 18 | **RCH**; 24 | DAR; 10 | CLT; 18 | DOV; 34 | NSH; 43 | KEN; 40 | MLW; 4 | DAY; 18 | CHI; 19 | NHA; 14 | MAR; 8 | GTY; 33 | IRP; 19 | GLN; 35 | MCH; 13 | BRI; 5 | CAL; 24 | RCH; 20 | DOV; 5 | KAN; 31 | CLT; 28 | MEM; 34 | TEX; 43 | PHO; 14 | HOM; 19 | 13th | 3554 | |
| 2007 | Braun Racing | 38 | Toyota | DAY; 22 | CAL; 38 | MXC; 6 | LVS; 37 | ATL; 41 | BRI; 34 | NSH; 4 | TEX; 13 | PHO; 18 | TAL; 35 | RCH; 37 | DAR; 6 | CLT; 31 | DOV; 11 | NSH; 3 | KEN; 14 | MLW; 3 | NHA; 12 | **DAY**; 9 | CHI; 33 | GTY; 4 | IRP; 1 | CGV; 26 | GLN; 27 | MCH; 12 | **BRI**; 2* | CAL; 14 | RCH; 11 | DOV; 30 | KAN; 21 | CLT; 19 | MEM; 5 | TEX; 12 | PHO; 8 | HOM; 14 | 3rd | 3996 | |
| 2008 | Braun Racing | 38 | Toyota | DAY; 19 | CAL; 11 | LVS; 39 | ATL; 8 | BRI; 6 | NSH; 13 | TEX; 9 | PHO; 14 | MXC; 21 | TAL; 4 | RCH; 16 | DAR; 9 | CLT; 32 | DOV; 27 | NSH; 26 | KEN; 16 | MLW; 10 | NHA; 32 | DAY; 23 | CHI; 27 | GTY; 4 | IRP; 16 | CGV; 7 | GLN; 8 | MCH; 8 | BRI; 15 | CAL; 26 | RCH; 30 | DOV; 7 | KAN; 8 | CLT; 18 | MEM; 12 | TEX; 17 | PHO; 25 | HOM; 4 | 9th | 4086 | |
| 2009 | Braun Racing | 38 | Toyota | DAY; 33 | CAL; 11 | LVS; 4 | BRI; 10 | TEX; 13 | NSH; 6 | PHO; 2 | TAL; 6 | RCH; 10 | DAR; 2 | CLT; 6 | DOV; 8 | NSH; 5 | KEN; 6 | MLW; 10 | NHA; 10 | DAY; 19 | CHI; 4 | GTY; 14 | IRP; 8 | IOW; 3 | GLN; 15 | MCH; 11 | BRI; 6 | CGV; 29 | ATL; 20 | RCH; 32 | DOV; 6 | KAN; 11 | CAL; 30 | CLT; 32 | MEM; 3 | TEX; 3 | PHO; 27 | HOM; 18 | 4th | 4540 | |
| 2010 | Braun Racing | 10 | Toyota | DAY; 33 | | | BRI; 9 | | | | | | DAR; 5 | DOV; 5 | CLT; 7 | | | | | | | | | | | | BRI; 2 | | ATL; 7 | | | | | | | | | | 9th | 3941 | |
| 2010 | Braun Racing | 38 | Toyota | | CAL; 14 | LVS; 12 | | NSH; 39 | PHO; 19 | TEX; 12 | TAL; 41 | RCH; 16 | | | | NSH; 34 | KEN; 33 | ROA; 8 | NHA; 14 | DAY; 14 | CHI; 5 | GTY; 23 | IRP; 30 | IOW; 3 | GLN; 35 | MCH; 34 | | CGV; 21 | | RCH; 14 | | | | | | | | | 9th | 3941 | |
| 2010 | Turner Motorsports | 38 | Toyota | | | | | | | | | | | | | | | | | | | | | | | | | | | | DOV; 8 | KAN; 10 | CAL; 37 | CLT; 15 | GTY; 4 | TEX; 6 | PHO; 33 | | 9th | 3941 | |
| 2010 | Turner Motorsports | 10 | Toyota | | | | | | | | | | | | | | | | | | | | | | | | | | | | | | | | | | | HOM; 10 | 9th | 3941 | |
| 2011 | Turner Motorsports | 30 | Chevy | DAY; 6 | | | BRI; 8 | | TEX; 15 | | | | DAR; 9 | | | | | | | | | | | | | | | BRI; 7 | ATL; 9 | | | DOV; 19 | | CLT; 11 | | | | | 6th | 1028 | |
| 2011 | Turner Motorsports | 38 | Chevy | | PHO; 11 | LVS; 9 | | CAL; 11 | | TAL; 15 | NSH; 15 | RCH; 10 | | DOV; 11 | IOW; 33 | CLT; 21 | CHI; 5 | MCH; 10 | ROA; 20 | DAY; 2 | KEN; 13 | NHA; 30 | NSH; 18 | IRP; 6 | IOW; 13 | GLN; 18 | CGV; 9 | | | RCH; 29 | CHI; 12 | | KAN; 13 | | TEX; 15 | PHO; 26 | HOM; 12 | | 6th | 1028 | |
| 2012 | Turner Motorsports | 30 | Chevy | DAY | PHO | LVS | BRI | CAL | TEX | RCH | TAL | DAR | IOW | CLT | DOV | MCH | ROA | KEN | DAY | NHA | CHI | IND | IOW; 8 | GLN | CGV | BRI | ATL | RCH | CHI | KEN | DOV | CLT | KAN | TEX | PHO; 12 | HOM | | | 120th | 0^{1} | |

==== Camping World Truck Series ====
NASCAR Camping World Truck Series results
| Year | Team | No. | Make | 1 | 2 | 3 | 4 | 5 | 6 | 7 | 8 | 9 | 10 | 11 | 12 | 13 | 14 | 15 | 16 | 17 | 18 | 19 | 20 | 21 | 22 | 23 | 24 | 25 | NCWTC | Pts | Ref |
|---|---|---|---|---|---|---|---|---|---|---|---|---|---|---|---|---|---|---|---|---|---|---|---|---|---|---|---|---|---|---|---|
| 2000 | Ultra Motorsports | 5 | Ford | DAY | HOM | PHO | MMR | MAR | PIR | GTY | MEM | PPR | EVG | TEX | KEN | GLN | MLW | NHA | NZH | MCH | IRP; 29 | NSV | CIC | RCH | DOV | TEX | CAL | | 103rd | 76 | |
| 2002 | Ultra Motorsports | 2 | Dodge | DAY; 11 | **DAR**; 30 | MAR; 6 | GTY; 2 | **PIR**; 2^{*} | DOV; 9 | **TEX**; 27 | **MEM**; 4 | MLW; 2 | **KAN**; 4 | **KEN**; 5 | **NHA**; 27 | MCH; 2 | IRP; 2 | NSH; 28 | **RCH**; 12^{*} | TEX; 8 | SBO; 9 | LVS; 5 | CAL; 2 | PHO; 16 | HOM; 3 | | | | 4th | 3156 | |
| 2003 | Ultra Motorsports | 2 | Dodge | **DAY**; 30 | DAR; 6 | MMR; 7 | MAR; 11 | CLT; 21 | DOV; 1 | TEX; 27 | MEM; 6 | MLW; 2 | KAN; 7 | KEN; 5 | GTW; 2 | **MCH**; 4 | IRP; 15 | NSH; 24 | BRI; 9 | RCH | NHA | CAL | LVS | SBO | TEX | MAR | PHO | HOM | 16th | 2209 | |
| 2004 | Morgan-Dollar Motorsports | 47 | Chevy | DAY | ATL | MAR | MFD | CLT | DOV | TEX | MEM | MLW | KAN | KEN | GTW | MCH | IRP | NSH | BRI | RCH | NHA | LVS | CAL | TEX | MAR | PHO | DAR; 24 | HOM | 95th | 91 | |
| 2007 | Red Horse Racing | 1 | Toyota | DAY | CAL | ATL | MAR | KAN | CLT | MFD | DOV | TEX | MCH | MLW | MEM | KEN | IRP | NSH | BRI | GTW | NHA | LVS | TAL; 4 | MAR; 23 | ATL | TEX; 9 | PHO; 4 | HOM; 5 | 41st | 707 | |
| 2009 | Stringer Motorsports | 90 | Toyota | DAY | CAL | ATL | MAR | KAN | CLT | DOV | TEX | MCH | MLW; 29 | MEM | KEN | IRP | NSH | BRI | CHI | IOW | GTW | NHA | LVS | MAR | TAL | TEX | PHO | HOM | 99th | 76 | |
| 2012 | Kyle Busch Motorsports | 18 | Toyota | DAY; 36 | MAR; 8 | CAR; 34 | KAN; 18 | CLT; 4 | DOV | TEX; 6 | KEN; 8 | IOW; 6 | CHI; 8 | POC | MCH | BRI | ATL | IOW | KEN | LVS | TAL | MAR | TEX | PHO | | | | | 23rd | 294 | |
| 2012 | Hillman Racing | 27 | Chevy | | | | | | | | | | | | | | | | | | | | | | HOM; 19 | | | | 23rd | 294 | |

^{1} Ineligible for series points

=== ARCA Bondo/Mar-Hyde Series ===
(key) (Bold – Pole position awarded by qualifying time. Italics – Pole position earned by points standings or practice time. * – Most laps led.)

ARCA Bondo/Mar-Hyde Series results
| Year | Team | No. | Make | 1 | 2 | 3 | 4 | 5 | 6 | 7 | 8 | 9 | 10 | 11 | 12 | 13 | 14 | 15 | 16 | 17 | 18 | 19 | 20 | 21 | ABMSC | Pts | Ref |
|---|---|---|---|---|---|---|---|---|---|---|---|---|---|---|---|---|---|---|---|---|---|---|---|---|---|---|---|
| 1999 | Joe Gibbs Racing | 18 | Pontiac | DAY | ATL | SLM | AND | CLT | MCH | POC | TOL | SBS | BLN | POC | KIL | FRS | FLM | ISF | WIN | DSF | SLM | CLT | TAL | ATL; 5 | 87th | 205 | |
| 2000 | Joe Gibbs Racing | 18 | Pontiac | DAY | SLM | AND | CLT | KIL | FRS | MCH | POC | TOL | KEN | BLN | POC | WIN | ISF | KEN | DSF | SLM | CLT; 31 | TAL | ATL | | 124th | 100 | |

== See also ==
- Driver deaths in motorsport
- List of people from Long Beach, California
