= Greg Biffle =

American racing driver (1969–2025)

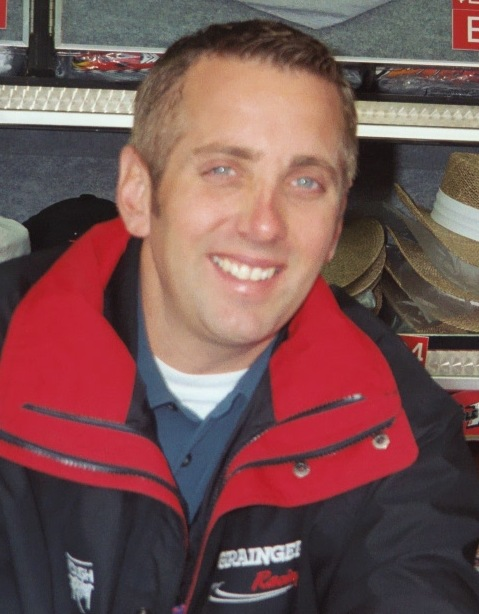
- Biffle in 2003
- Born: Gregory Jack Biffle; December 23, 1969; Vancouver, Washington, U.S.
- Died: December 18, 2025 (aged 55); Statesville, North Carolina, U.S.
- Cause of death: Plane crash
- Height: 5 ft 9 in (1.75 m)
- Weight: 170 lb (77 kg)
- Achievements: 2002 NASCAR Busch Series Champion; 2000 NASCAR Craftsman Truck Series Champion; 2005, 2006 Southern 500 Winner; 2015, 2016 Sprint Showdown Winner
- Awards: 2001 NASCAR Busch Series Rookie of the Year; 1998 NASCAR Craftsman Truck Series Rookie of the Year; 2002 NASCAR Busch Series Most Popular Driver; 2000 NASCAR Craftsman Truck Series Most Popular Driver; West Coast Stock Car Hall of Fame (2022); Named one of NASCAR's 75 Greatest Drivers (2023)

NASCAR Cup Series career
- 515 races run over 16 years
- 2022 position: 35th
- Best finish: 2nd (2005)
- First race: 2002 NAPA Auto Parts 500 (California)
- Last race: 2022 GEICO 500 (Talladega)
- First win: 2003 Pepsi 400 (Daytona)
- Last win: 2013 Quicken Loans 400 (Michigan)
Wins	Top tens	Poles
19	175	13

NASCAR O'Reilly Auto Parts Series career
- 244 races run over 11 years
- 2010 position: 35th
- Best finish: 1st (2002)
- First race: 1996 AC-Delco 200 (Rockingham)
- Last race: 2010 TECH-NET Auto Service 300 powered by Carquest (Charlotte)
- First win: 2001 Pepsi 300 (Nashville)
- Last win: 2009 Bashas' Supermarkets 200 (Phoenix)
Wins	Top tens	Poles
20	149	14

NASCAR FedEx Freight Truck Series career
- 83 races run over 7 years
- 2020 position: 63rd
- Best finish: 1st (2000)
- First race: 1998 Chevy Trucks Challenge (Orlando)
- Last race: 2020 South Carolina Education Lottery 200 (Darlington)
- First win: 1999 Memphis 200 (Memphis)
- Last win: 2019 SpeedyCash.com 400 (Texas)
Wins	Top tens	Poles
17	55	12

ARCA Menards Series West career
- 5 races run over 3 years
- Best finish: 25th (2025)
- First race: 1996 NASCAR Winston West Series 150 (Tucson)
- Last race: 2025 Portland 112 (Portland)
Wins	Top tens	Poles
0	4	0
- Statistics up to date as of December 18, 2025.

Gregory Jack Biffle (December 23, 1969 – December 18, 2025), nicknamed "the Biff", was an American professional stock car racing driver. He most notably raced from 2002 to 2022 in the NASCAR Cup Series, most notably driving the No. 16 Ford for Roush Fenway Racing from 2002 to 2016 and last competed part-time in the ARCA Menards Series West, driving the No. 23 and No. 24 Chevrolet SS for Sigma Performance Services in 2025.

After racing in the NASCAR Winter Heat Series in the mid-1990s, he was recommended to Jack Roush by former racer and announcer Benny Parsons. With Roush Racing, he was the 1998 NASCAR Craftsman Truck Series Rookie of the Year. He won the 2000 Craftsman Truck championship. He reprised this progression in the NASCAR Busch Series, winning the 2001 Rookie of the Year, immediately followed by winning the 2002 championship. Biffle drove in the NASCAR Sprint Cup Series for Roush from 2003 until 2016, winning 19 races in the No. 16 Ford.

Biffle, who began his NASCAR career in 1995, was the first of only three drivers that have won a championship in both the Busch Series and the Craftsman Truck Series, and the sixth of only thirty-six drivers to win a race in each of NASCAR's three national series.

After retirement, Biffle returned to NASCAR with a Truck Series start for Kyle Busch Motorsports in 2019, and for GMS Racing in 2020. Biffle was killed in an airplane crash in Statesville, North Carolina, in December 2025, along with all other passengers and crew of the plane, which included his family, which consisted of himself, his wife, Christina, and their two children, Emma, age 14, and Ryder, age 5.

== Racing career ==
Biffle was born on December 23, 1969 in Vancouver, Washington, and grew up in Camas. He began his racing career driving on short tracks around the Pacific Northwest. He first gained attention as a driver when he raced in the nationally televised Winter Heat Series in the winter of 1995–1996. Biffle dominated the series championship that winter, leading former ESPN announcer and NASCAR champion, Benny Parsons, to recommend the driver to Jack Roush.

Biffle entered the first two races of the 1996 NASCAR Winston West Series, finishing thirtieth at Tucson and fourth at Altamont. His debut in one of NASCAR's national divisions came later that year when he ran the final two Busch Series races of the season. Driving a Chevrolet for Dick Bown, he finished twenty-third at Rockingham but lost an engine the following race at Homestead and finished thirty-sixth. In 1997, Biffle competed in the now-defunct NASCAR Northwest Series and won the Most Popular Driver Award.

=== Truck Series ===
Roush Racing promoted Biffle to a full-time driver in the Craftsman Truck Series in 1998. Despite not winning a race that season, his four pole positions are the most by a Truck Series rookie to date, and they helped him earn an 8th-place finish in the final standings and the Rookie of the Year Award. He followed it up with a stellar 1999 season in which he recorded nine wins, the single-season Truck Series record that stood (until Corey Heim broke his record with 12 wins in 2025). He finished second in the final standings, just eight points behind champion Jack Sprague. In 2000, Biffle won the Truck Series title with another five-win season, beating his Roush teammate Kurt Busch by 230 points. It was Biffle's first championship in one of NASCAR's three major series. It was announced that Biffle would move up to the Busch Series for 2001; however, he ran four more Truck races for Roush that season and won at Phoenix. Biffle made a Truck Series start in 2004 for another long-time Ford team, Circle Bar Racing, at Homestead.

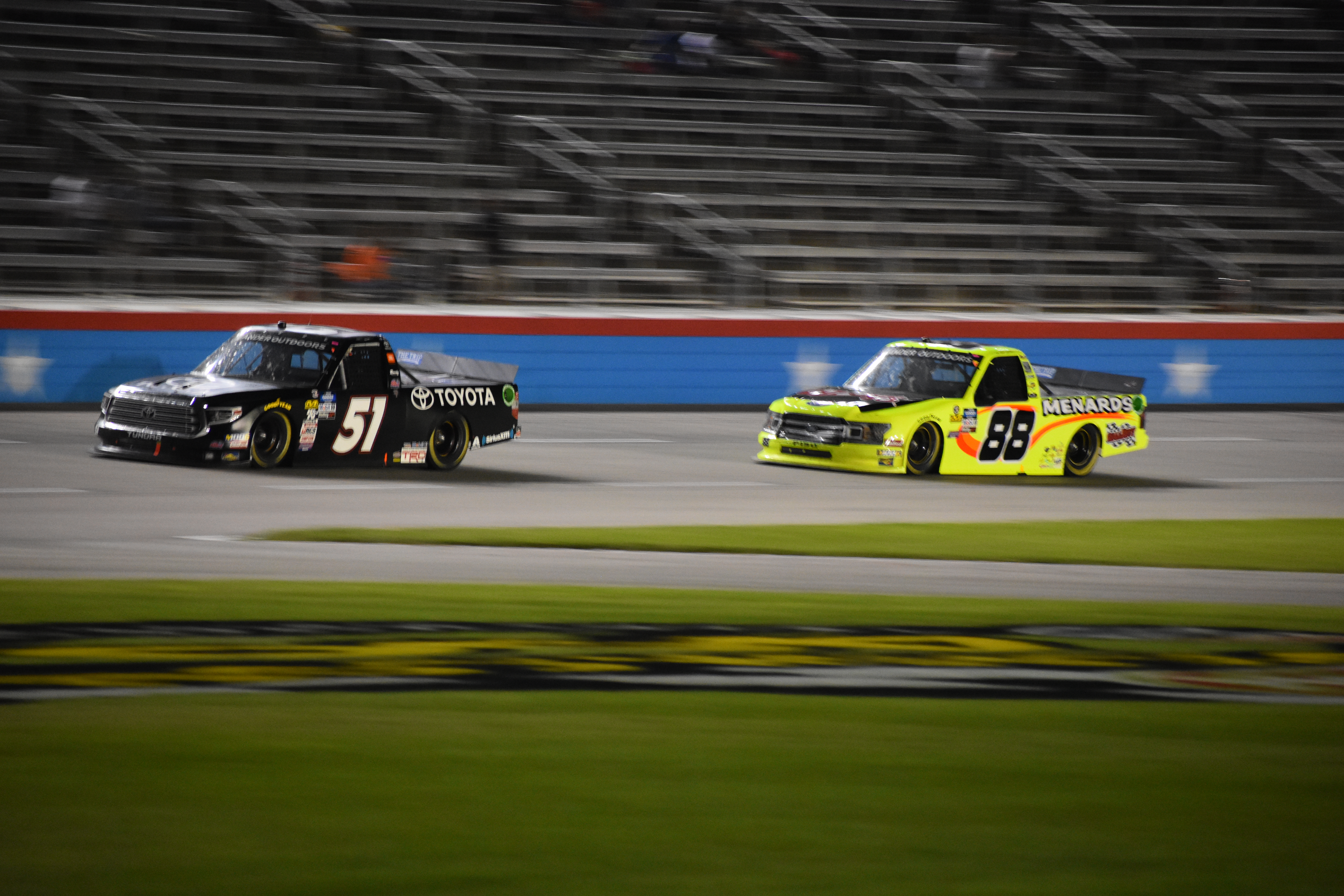
Biffle ahead of Matt Crafton at Texas in 2019

On March 28, 2019, Biffle announced he would be testing with Kyle Busch Motorsports the next day at Texas Motor Speedway in the No. 51 truck. He was eventually tabbed to drive the truck for the SpeedyCash.com 400 at Texas. Biffle started sixth and won in his series return, leading 18 laps and holding off Matt Crafton while winning $50,000 in a promotion with Gander Outdoors; it was his first Truck victory since 2001.

On August 27, 2020, it was announced that Biffle would make another one-off start in the Truck Series, this time in the No. 24 for GMS Racing at Darlington. He went on to finish nineteenth.

=== Nationwide Series ===
Biffle joined the Busch Series full-time in 2001 and won the Rookie of the Year Award with five wins and a fourth-place finish in the final standings. The following season, he won another four races and earned 20 top-five finishes out of 34 races en route to his first Busch Series title and the second NASCAR national championship of his career.

Biffle ran only part-time in Busch competition in 2003 as Roush moved him up to a full-time ride in the Winston Cup Series for that season, but he returned to contend for the Busch Series championship again in 2004. He placed third in the standings behind Martin Truex Jr. and Kyle Busch. From 2005 to 2009, Biffle raced part-time for Roush Fenway Racing in the Busch (now O'Reilly Auto Parts Series) every year. He won twice in 2009, at Las Vegas and Phoenix, after going winless the previous two seasons. Biffle returned to the Nationwide Series in 2010, driving the No. 27 Ford for Baker Curb Racing.

=== Cup Series ===
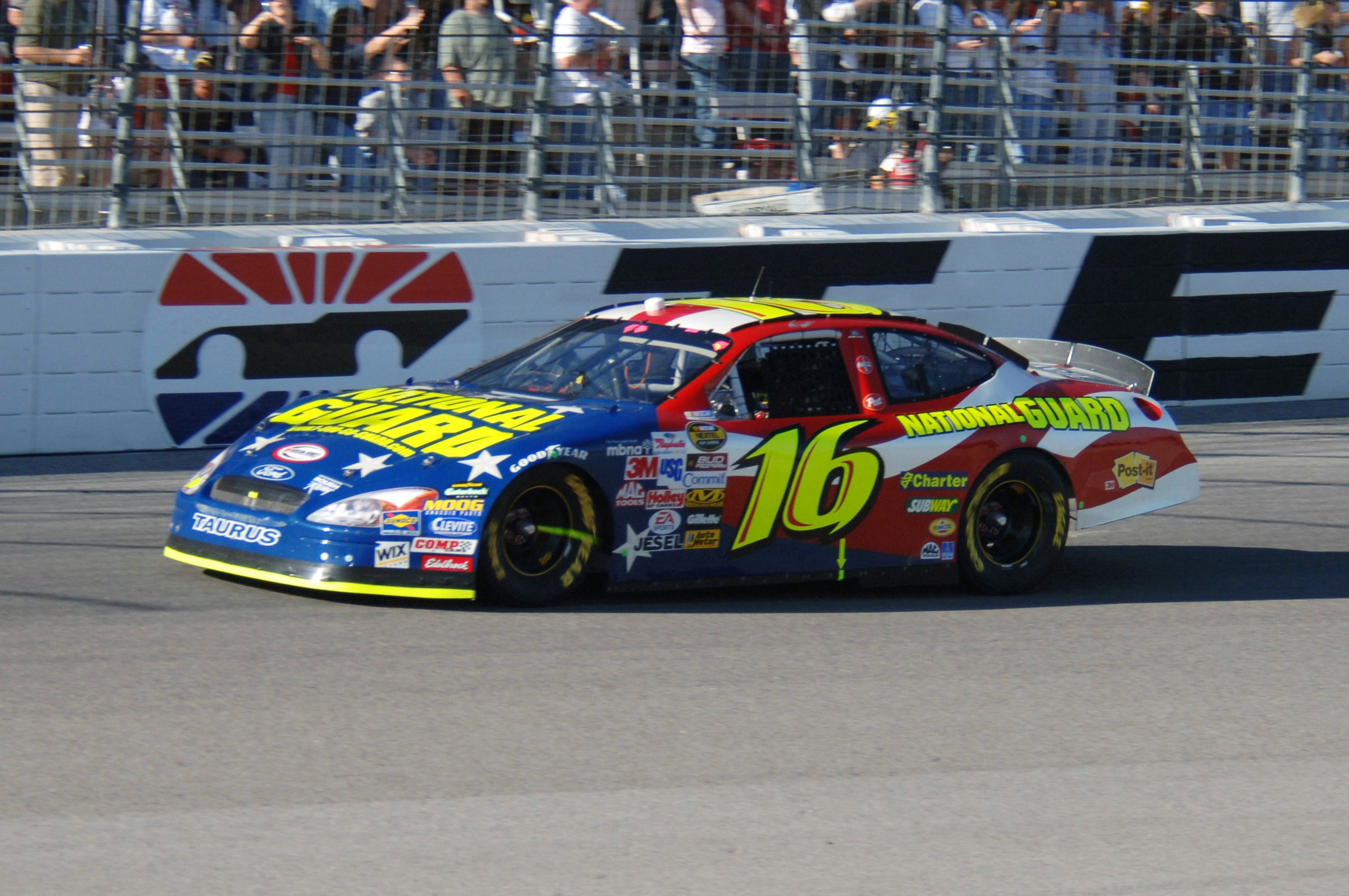
Biffle racing at Texas Motor Speedway in 2005

Biffle began his Cup Series career in the 2002 season. He attempted to qualify in a Roush Ford for the 2002 Daytona 500 but failed to make the race. He would make his first Cup debut nine races later at California, a race in which he finished thirteenth. That was his best finish in seven races that year as he also drove four in a Chevrolet for Andy Petree Racing and two in a Dodge for Petty Enterprises.

Biffle began competing full-time in NASCAR's top division in 2003, with sponsorship from W. W. Grainger, who had previously sponsored him in the Busch and Truck Series. He earned his first win in the Pepsi 400 at Daytona that season and finished second to Jamie McMurray (who would later join him as a teammate at Roush) for Raybestos Rookie of the Year. His Daytona win made him the first Winston Cup winner to succeed in all three of NASCAR's national series in succession (as opposed to others who won in the Busch or Truck Series after graduating to Winston Cup); a feat which has since become quite common for young stock car drivers climbing the ladder. Biffle placed twentieth in the final points standings. Biffle made an immediate impact in his sophomore season in 2004, earning the pole in the Daytona 500. However, Biffle was forced to start at the rear due to an engine change. Despite missing NASCAR's first-ever Chase for the NEXTEL Cup, Biffle won twice that season, at Michigan and Homestead en route to a 17th-place finish in the final points standings.

2005 was Biffle's breakout season. He won six races (at California Speedway, Texas, Darlington, Dover, and Michigan along with the season finale at Homestead), the most of any driver that year, and qualified for the Chase for the first time in his career, bringing home a second place finish in the standings, 35 points behind champion Tony Stewart; Biffle tied with his teammate Carl Edwards in points but won the tie-breaker based on race wins.

Biffle regressed in 2006, missing the Chase for the Cup despite winning twice at Darlington Raceway and Homestead-Miami Speedway (both of which were tracks at which he had also won in the previous season). He finished thirteenth in the standings, third-best of the drivers not to qualify for the Chase. He also missed the Chase the following year, in a season marred by the No. 16 team's new primary sponsor Ameriquest Mortgage suffering financial difficulty and having to sell off a number of its race sponsorships. Biffle won only one race in 2007, at Kansas Speedway. As Biffle was doing burnouts on the track, third place Jimmie Johnson and second place Clint Bowyer accused Biffle of not maintaining speed under a final lap caution, but this was denied by NASCAR, which said Biffle had pace car speed.

In 2007, Biffle finished 14th in the standings, second-best of the non-Chase drivers as the Chase expanded to a twelve-driver format that year.

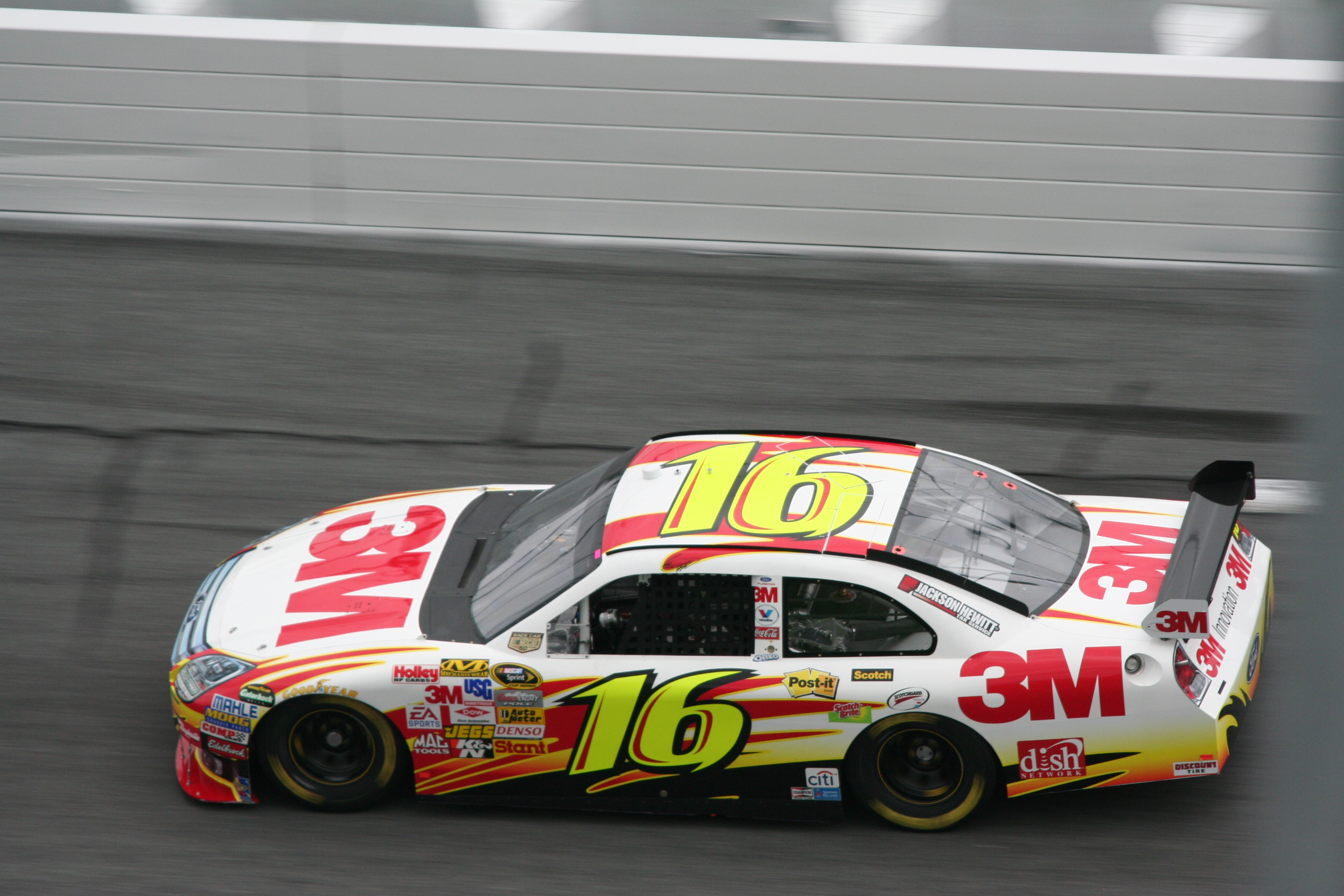
Biffle racing at Daytona International Speedway in 2008

In June 2008, Biffle signed a three-year-long contract extension with Roush Fenway Racing. Despite going winless during the 26-race regular season, Biffle made for the Chase for the Sprint Cup that year and won the first two Chase races, at New Hampshire and Dover. In doing so, he became the first driver to win the first two Chase races in a season.

Biffle qualified for the Chase for the second year in a row in 2009 but, for the first time since 2002 (when he ran a limited schedule), failed to record a win. During a test in January 2009 at Texas World Speedway, Biffle managed to reach a top speed of 218 miles per hour (351 km/h) and lap average of 195 mph (314 km/h) in a test for Roush Fenway Racing as part of evading NASCAR's testing ban. This became the fastest time ever achieved on this track by any competitor (amateur or professional).

In 2010, Biffle qualified for the third year in a row for the Chase despite spotty performance in the regular season. He won twice at Pocono and Kansas. In 2011, Biffle's season improved, thanks in part to the implementation of Ford's new FR9 engine. However, crew chief Greg Erwin was replaced after Kentucky by Matt Puccia. The addition of Puccia helped Biffle's performance late in the season, despite the team missing the Chase and finishing sixteenth in points. Biffle missed the Chase in 2011 for the first time since 2007.

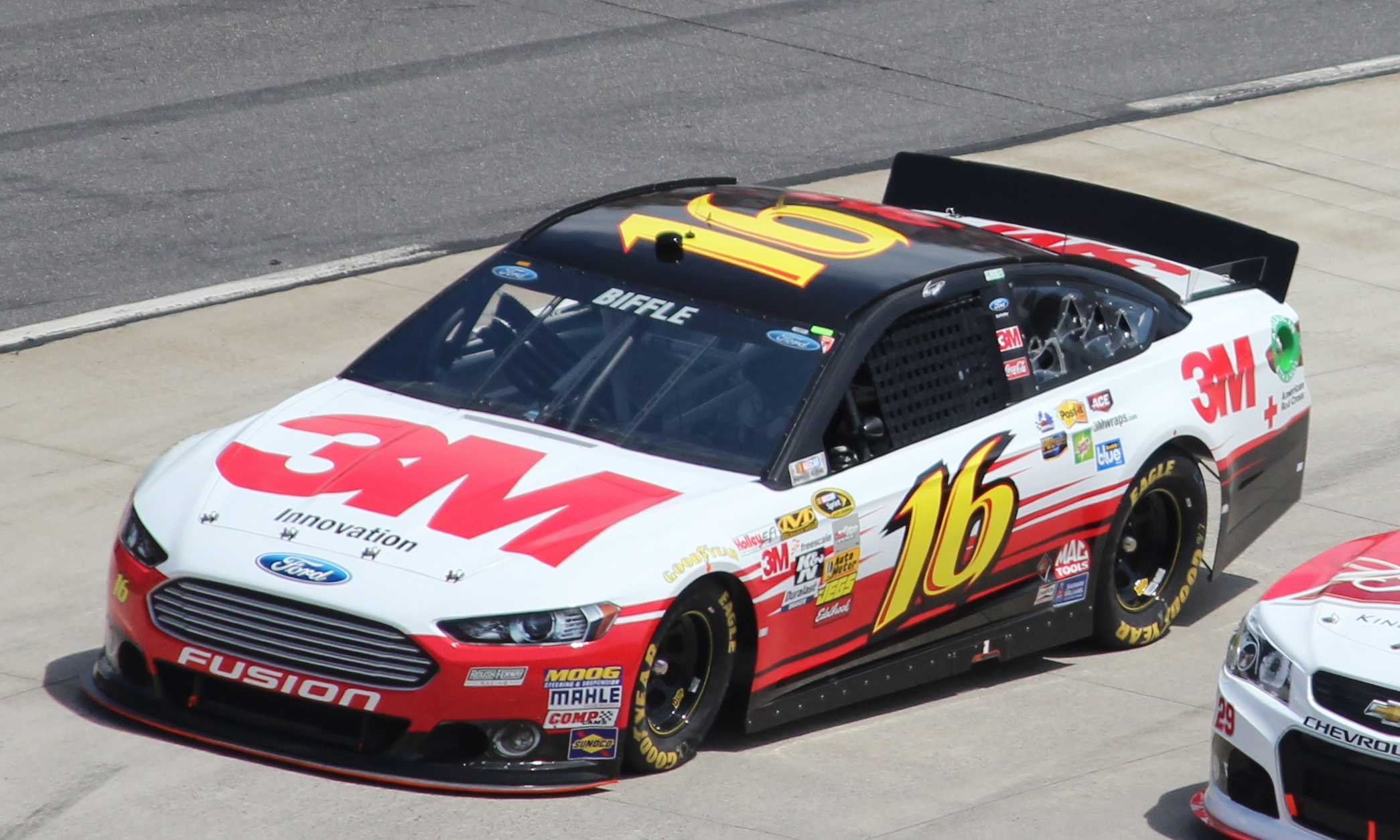
Biffle competes in the 2013 STP Gas Booster 500

In 2012, Biffle and Puccia remained at RFR and gained the points lead after Las Vegas after three consecutive third-place finishes. At the 2012 Daytona 500, Biffle found himself second coming to the white flag for the third time in two years and again finished third. Eerily, the third place at Vegas came in Biffle's 333rd Cup start. Biffle's first win of the 2012 season came at Texas Motor Speedway in the Samsung Mobile 500 after passing Jimmie Johnson with thirty laps left in the race. Biffle won at Michigan holding off Brad Keselowski after Jimmie Johnson blew an engine.

Biffle started off 2013 by being in the same position for the third time in four years; in second place coming to the white flag in the 2013 Daytona 500, but this time ended up sixth. In the 2013 Quicken Loans 400 at Michigan, Biffle won his fourth race at the track and the 1,000th victory for Ford.

At the 2014 Coca-Cola 600, Biffle surpassed Clint Bowyer's record for most consecutive races without failing to finish with 84, tying Herman Beam's record, dating back to the 2011 Ford 400. The following week at the FedEx 400, he broke Beam's record by finishing the race 108 laps down in 38th. Later in the season, he finished with a DNF for the first time in 89 races after a wreck in the Coke Zero 400, finishing 29th.

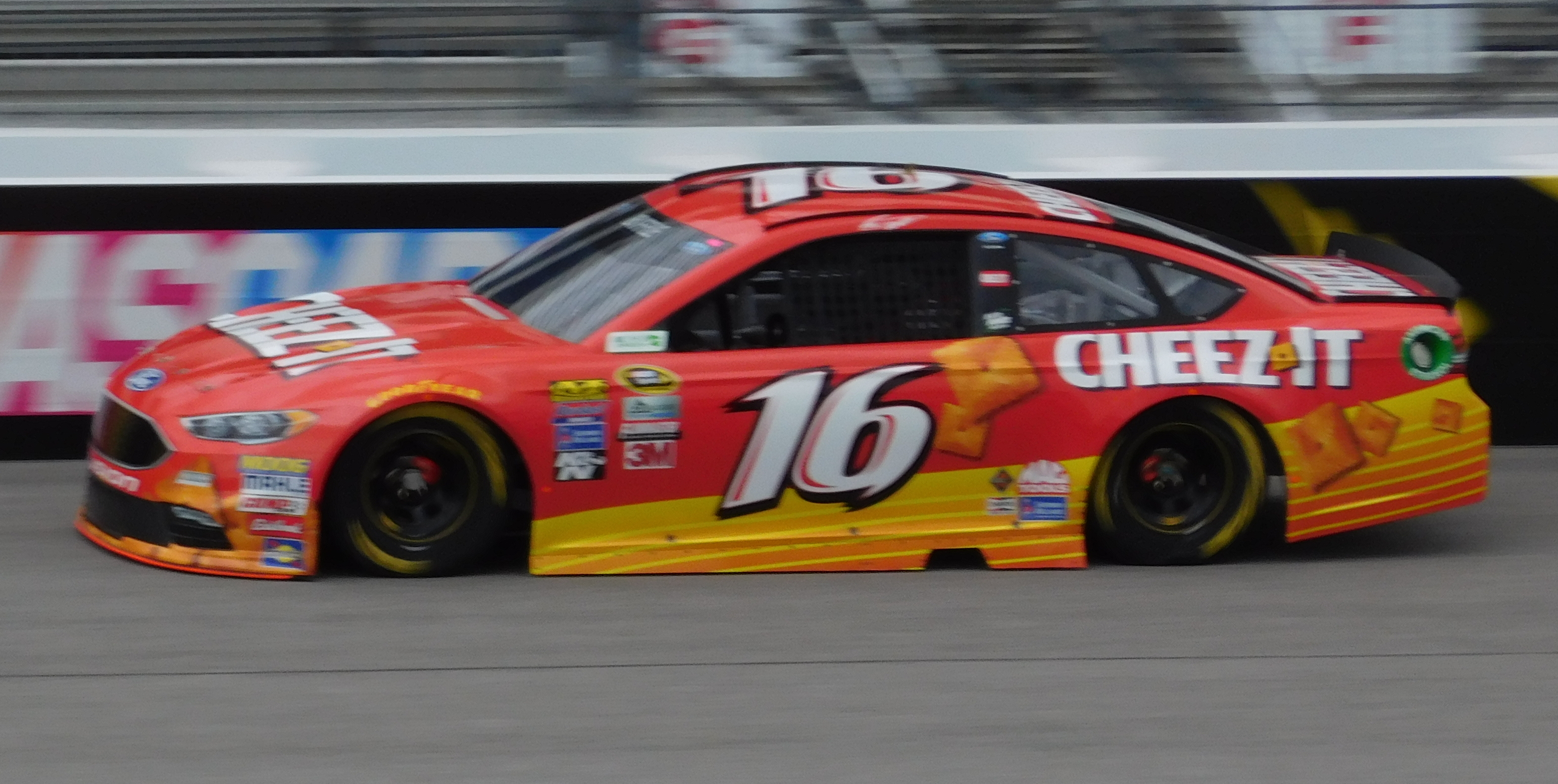
Biffle racing at Richmond International Raceway in 2016

Biffle began the pre-season with an announcement that he would stay at Roush Fenway Racing to help the team with a new sponsor Ortho. Biffle began 2015 with a tenth-place finish in the Daytona 500. Unfortunately, that was as good as it could get for Biffle as he faded outside the top twenty in points. He struggled mightily before picking up a second-place finish in the 2015 Coca-Cola 600, after starting fourth. He went on to pick up a fifth-place finish at Pocono in the 2015 Windows 10 400 and a fourth-place at New Hampshire in the 2015 Sylvania 300, finishing twentieth in points.

Ortho announced it would depart Roush following the 2015 season, leaving Biffle without a primary sponsor for the 2016 season. KFC then announced it would sponsor Biffle throughout Speedweeks and in the Daytona 500. He earned his first pole position in four seasons during qualifying for the Coke Zero 400 at Daytona and went on to finish eighth in the race. After finishing 23rd in points in 2016, Biffle and Roush Fenway mutually parted ways, making Biffle a free agent for the upcoming 2017 season. He did not sign on with a ride for the 2017 season.

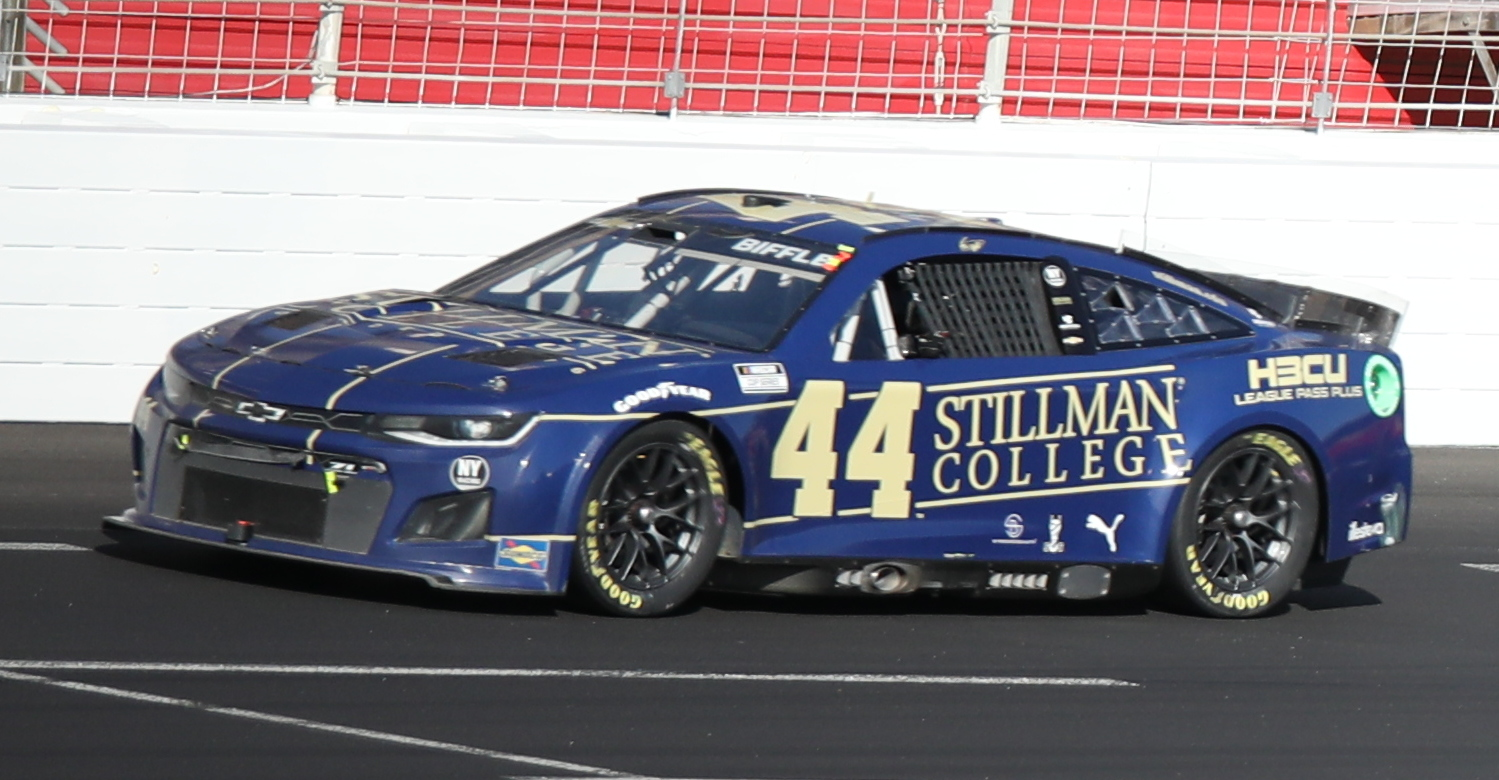
Biffle racing at Atlanta Motor Speedway in 2022

Biffle returned to the series in 2022, driving the No. 44 for NY Racing Team at the Daytona 500 and the remainder of the team's races that year as well. He was originally rumored to drive the No. 44 for NY Racing Team in the Daytona 500 in 2024, although he announced that he would not be in the car due to "unfulfilled contract obligations" from 2022, and would not drive any races for the team until said obligations are fulfilled, and was replaced by J. J. Yeley, despite his name still displayed on the car and firesuit.

=== Stadium Super Trucks ===
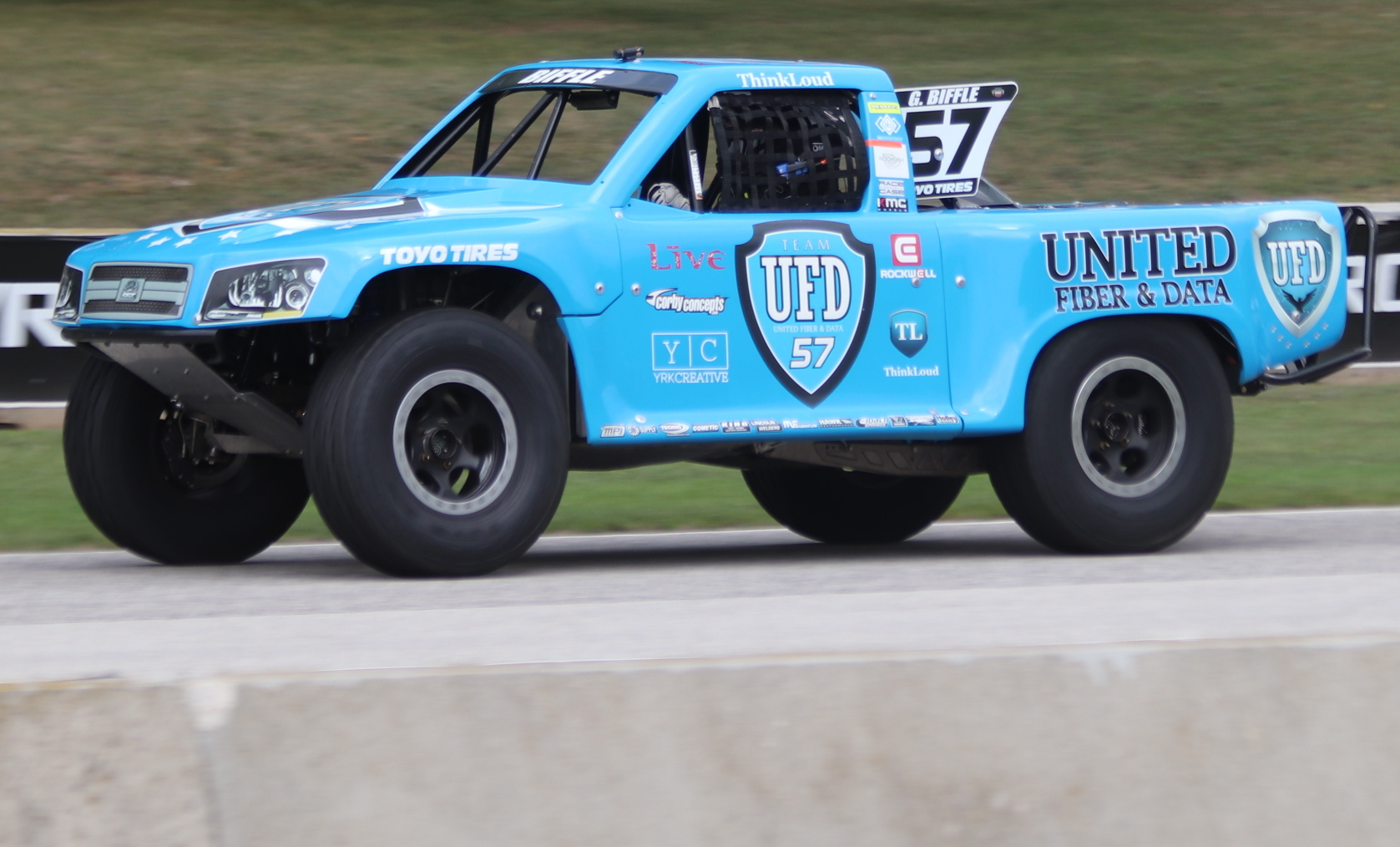
Biffle racing in the No. 57 Stadium Super Truck at Road America in 2018

On August 21, 2018, Biffle tested a Stadium Super Truck that was driven by fellow ex-NASCAR driver Casey Mears. A day later, he announced he would make his series debut at Road America. He finished seventh and second in the weekend's two races, though he did not receive points in the standings as he drove the No. 57 truck in place of Bill Hynes, who received the points earned by Biffle under series rules.

Biffle returned to SST for the 2019 season, sharing a Continental AG-sponsored truck with Sheldon Creed and Ryan Beat. He ran his first races of the year in late July at Mid-Ohio Sports Car Course. In the weekend's first round, he battled with Gavin Harlien for the lead until Harlien began suffering mechanical trouble; on the final restart, Cole Potts passed Biffle to take the race win. The second round saw Biffle pit under caution for damage, but was able to finish fourth. In October, he ran his first SST race in Australia at Surfers Paradise Street Circuit. In practice, he was the fastest in the ten-driver field but did not set a qualifying time after flipping his truck when he hit a tire barrier. He ran in second for much of the first race before falling to fourth after an erratic landing; the second race saw a late spin drop him to eighth. After not racing in 2020, Biffle rejoined the series at the 2021 Mid-Ohio NASCAR weekend. He finished second in Race 2.

=== Superstar Racing Experience ===
In 2021, it was announced that Biffle would pilot the No. 69 car in select 2021 Camping World SRX Series races. He started his season off at the inaugural SRX race at Stafford Motor Speedway, winning the first heat but getting caught up in a wreck in the second heat. For the main event, he switched to a backup car and drove to second by the end of the race, behind only Doug Coby.

=== Other racing ===
In 2003, Biffle competed in the International Race of Champions. He recorded a best finish of third at Talladega and finished seventh in points. Biffle, along with Roush teammates Kurt Busch and Matt Kenseth, raced at the 2005 24 Hours of Daytona for Multimatic Motorsports. The team lost a halfshaft during the race and finished 27th.

In 2018, Biffle started the Sand Outlaw Series for racing UTVs. Since then the series has grown into a popular multi-class drag racing championship featuring hill climbs and flat track events. He competed out of his own UTV shop, Pace Offroad.

== Personal life ==
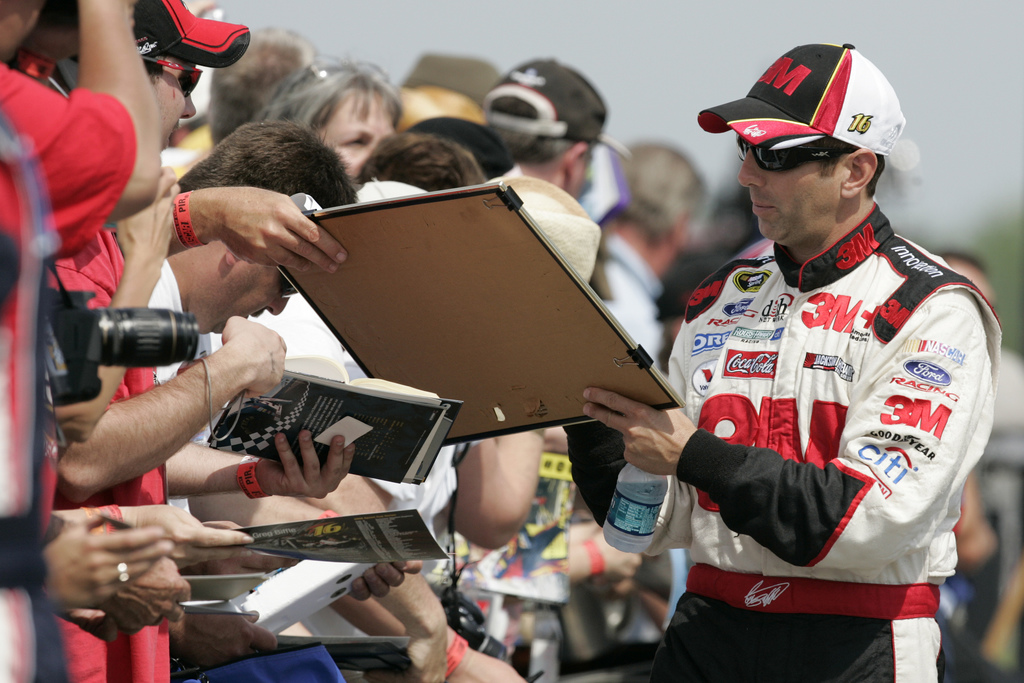
Biffle signs autographs along pit lane at Pocono Raceway.

Greg Biffle was the son of Garland Jack Biffle II (1941–2016) and Sally Frye. He had a brother, Jeffrey. He was of German and English descent, as his ancestor Johannes Büffel (1728–1804) came from Contwig in western Germany and settled in North Carolina.

Biffle married Nicole (née Lunders) on October 17, 2007. Their daughter was born in 2011. Greg and Nicole Biffle separated in early 2015, and were divorced in early 2016.

Biffle's second child, a son, was born in 2020. The child's mother was Cristina Grossu. Biffle and Grossu were married in the Bahamas on December 31, 2022.

Biffle was a fan of fishing and enjoyed deep-sea fishing in Mexico, where he kept a factory-sponsored Luhrs fishing boat. He once owned a pub in his hometown of Vancouver called "Biffle's Pub and Grill" located at 11500 NE 76th St. In 2010 he announced that he had become part-owner of Willamette Speedway in Lebanon, Oregon, along with Sunset Speedway in Banks, Oregon. He was also a private pilot and owned a Cessna 210 as well as a Dassault Falcon 50 with the tail number N116GB, a Dassault Falcon 10 with the tail number N316GB, and a Bell 206 with tail number N216GB. Biffle was a private helicopter pilot and used his own helicopter to help people in Western North Carolina which were affected by Hurricane Helene.

Biffle owned a 2005 Ford GT and a 2007 Shelby Mustang GT500. The Shelby Mustang engine was rebuilt in 2013, having 983 horsepower and 799 lb-ft of torque.

A civil suit for invasion of privacy against Biffle was filed by his ex-wife and mother-in-law, alleging that Biffle had placed secret cameras in his home. The jury awarded Biffle's ex-wife $1 in compensatory damages and $500,000 in punitive damages, reduced to a total of $250,001 due to a legal limit on punitive damages. On February 17, 2017, Biffle announced that instead of racing full-time in 2017, he would join NBC Sports' NASCAR America as an analyst beginning March 1, 2017.

=== Death ===
On December 18, 2025, a Cessna Citation 550 private jet registered by Biffle crashed while attempting to land at Statesville Regional Airport. All seven people aboard the plane died as a result of the crash. Biffle was identified as a passenger by the North Carolina State Highway Patrol. The families of those affected released a joint statement saying that in addition to Greg Biffle, his wife Cristina and both of his children were aboard. Pilots Dennis and Jack Dutton, and former Kenny Wallace hauler driver Craig Wadsworth were also onboard the aircraft.

=== Tributes ===
On January 22, 2026, it was announced that all four of RFK Racing's entries for the 2026 Daytona 500 would be run using Biffle's font. In addition, Kaulig Racing's No. 16 car would also run the race using his font. Niece Motorsports also carried the Biffle number font on their four entries at the 2026 Fresh From Florida 250, as did Norm Benning, who also had a memorial plaque on the bed of his truck.

At Darlington, several teams would run throwbacks to Biffle's past schemes. In the NASCAR O'Reilly Auto Parts Series, Dean Thompson would run a throwback to Biffle's 2011 primary paint scheme and Brennan Poole would run a throwback to both his 2005 and 2006 Southern 500 victories at the same track. In the NASCAR Cup Series, RFK would once again have all their cars run throwbacks; featuring his 2009 primary paint scheme on Ryan Preece's car as well as alternates from the 2010 and 2011 seasons on Chris Buescher and Brad Keselowski's cars.

== Motorsports career results ==
=== NASCAR ===
(key) (Bold – Pole position awarded by qualifying time. Italics – Pole position earned by points standings or practice time. * – Most laps led.)

==== Cup Series ====
NASCAR Cup Series results
Year	Team	No.	Make	1	2	3	4	5	6	7	8	9	10	11	12	13	14	15	16	17	18	19	20	21	22	23	24	25	26	27	28	29	30	31	32	33	34	35	36	NSCC	Pts	Ref
2002	Roush Racing	16	Ford	DAY; DNQ	CAR	LVS	ATL	DAR	BRI	TEX	MAR	TAL	CAL; 13	RCH	CLT	DOV	POC	MCH	SON	DAY	CHI	NHA	POC	IND	GLN	MCH; DNQ	BRI	DAR								ATL; DNQ				48th	570	
2002	Andy Petree Racing	55	Chevy																										RCH; 33	NHA; 27	DOV; 33	KAN; 36	TAL	CLT	MAR					48th	570	
2002	Petty Enterprises	44	Dodge																																		CAR; 25	PHO	HOM; 25	48th	570	
2003	Roush Racing	16	Ford	DAY; 21	CAR; 22	LVS; DNQ	ATL; 13	DAR; 12	BRI; 5	TEX; 28	TAL; 22	MAR; 18	CAL; 18	RCH; 17	CLT; 16	DOV; 30	POC; 20	MCH; 31	SON; 37	DAY; 1	CHI; 20	NHA; 10	POC; 27	IND; 21	GLN; 30	MCH; 4	BRI; 22	DAR; 10	RCH; 20	NHA; 43	DOV; 7	TAL; 24	KAN; 12	CLT; 17	MAR; 19	ATL; 34	PHO; 15	CAR; 11	HOM; 35	20th	3696	
2004	Roush Racing	16	Ford	**DAY**; 12	CAR; 23	LVS; 40	ATL; 8	DAR; 12	BRI; 12	TEX; 31	MAR; 35	TAL; 15	CAL; 33	RCH; 21	CLT; 21	DOV; 26	POC; 11	MCH; 23	SON; 13	DAY; 31	CHI; 20	NHA; 35	POC; 4	IND; 6	GLN; 35	MCH; 1*	BRI; 11	CAL; 36	RCH; 8	NHA; 28	DOV; 11	TAL; 28	KAN; 3	CLT; 33	MAR; 17	ATL; 10	PHO; 13	DAR; 24	HOM; 1*	17th	3902	
2005	Roush Racing	16	Ford	DAY; 25	CAL; 1	LVS; 6	ATL; 3	BRI; 9	MAR; 29	TEX; 1*	PHO; 41	TAL; 13	DAR; 1*	RCH; 6	CLT; 6	DOV; 1*	POC; 30	MCH; 1	SON; 14	DAY; 36	CHI; 11	NHA; 5	POC; 17	IND; 21	GLN; 38	MCH; 6	BRI; 3	CAL; 2	RCH; 3	NHA; 4	DOV; 13	TAL; 27	KAN; 2	CLT; 3	MAR; 20	ATL; 7	TEX; 20	PHO; 2*	HOM; 1	2nd	6498	
2006	Roush Racing	16	Ford	DAY; 31	CAL; 42*	**LVS**; 8	ATL; 16*	BRI; 7	MAR; 31	TEX; 42	PHO; 15*	TAL; 38	**RCH**; 4	DAR; 1*	CLT; 7	DOV; 8	POC; 6	MCH; 4	SON; 4	DAY; 31	CHI; 11	NHA; 3	POC; 24	IND; 33	GLN; 38	MCH; 7	BRI; 19	CAL; 24	RCH; 6	NHA; 14	DOV; 5	KAN; 12	TAL; 41	CLT; 37	MAR; 32	ATL; 5	TEX; 35	PHO; 34	HOM; 1	13th	4075	
2007	Roush Fenway Racing	16	Ford	DAY; 25	CAL; 15	LVS; 16	ATL; 41	BRI; 5	MAR; 32	TEX; 6	PHO; 17	TAL; 29	RCH; 19	DAR; 15	CLT; 43	DOV; 6	POC; 30	MCH; 38	SON; 5	NHA; 31	DAY; 6	CHI; 11	IND; 15	POC; 23	GLN; 10	MCH; 19	BRI; 10	CAL; 17	RCH; 39	NHA; 13	DOV; 2	KAN; 1	TAL; 23	CLT; 27	MAR; 7	**ATL**; 22	TEX; 33	PHO; 2	HOM; 13	14th	3991	
2008	Roush Fenway Racing	16	Ford	DAY; 10	CAL; 15	LVS; 3	ATL; 4	BRI; 4	MAR; 20	TEX; 39	PHO; 9	TAL; 18	RCH; 14	**DAR**; 43	CLT; 2	**DOV**; 3*	POC; 15	MCH; 20	SON; 11	NHA; 21	DAY; 43	CHI; 4	IND; 8	POC; 13	GLN; 21	MCH; 4	BRI; 11	CAL; 2	RCH; 14	NHA; 1	DOV; 1	KAN; 3	TAL; 24	CLT; 7	MAR; 12	ATL; 10	TEX; 5	PHO; 11	HOM; 18	3rd	6467	
2009	Roush Fenway Racing	16	Ford	DAY; 20	CAL; 4	LVS; 7	ATL; 34	BRI; 39	MAR; 28	TEX; 3	PHO; 5	TAL; 7	RCH; 17	DAR; 8*	CLT; 20	DOV; 3	POC; 11	MCH; 5	SON; 28	NHA; 18	DAY; 18	CHI; 31	IND; 4	POC; 15	GLN; 5	MCH; 20	BRI; 4	ATL; 10	RCH; 13	NHA; 9	DOV; 13	KAN; 3*	CAL; 20	CLT; 16	MAR; 25	TAL; 4	TEX; 8	PHO; 14	HOM; 14	7th	6292	
2010	Roush Fenway Racing	16	Ford	DAY; 3	CAL; 10	LVS; 10	ATL; 8	BRI; 4	MAR; 10	PHO; 22	TEX; 10	TAL; 17	RCH; 22	DAR; 22	DOV; 6	CLT; 32	POC; 28	MCH; 9	SON; 7	NHA; 16	DAY; 20	CHI; 35	IND; 3	POC; 1	GLN; 24	MCH; 4*	BRI; 8	ATL; 36	RCH; 32	NHA; 17	DOV; 19	KAN; 1	CAL; 41	CLT; 5	MAR; 33	TAL; 19	TEX; 5*	PHO; 4	HOM; 10	6th	6247	
2011	Roush Fenway Racing	16	Ford	DAY; 35	PHO; 20	LVS; 28	BRI; 8	CAL; 11	MAR; 21	TEX; 4	TAL; 7	RCH; 15	DAR; 8	DOV; 19	CLT; 13	KAN; 10	POC; 27	MCH; 15*	SON; 23	DAY; 18	KEN; 21	NHA; 18	IND; 7	POC; 8	GLN; 31	**MCH**; 20*	BRI; 31	ATL; 12	RCH; 13	CHI; 26	NHA; 3	DOV; 27	**KAN**; 8	CLT; 15	TAL; 14	MAR; 15	**TEX**; 5	PHO; 13	HOM; 35	16th	997	
2012	Roush Fenway Racing	16	Ford	DAY; 3	PHO; 3	LVS; 3	**BRI**; 13	CAL; 6	MAR; 13	TEX; 1	KAN; 5	RCH; 18	TAL; 5	**DAR**; 12	CLT; 4*	DOV; 11	POC; 24	MCH; 4	SON; 7	KEN; 21	DAY; 21	NHA; 9	IND; 3	POC; 15	GLN; 6	MCH; 1	BRI; 19	ATL; 15	RCH; 9	CHI; 13	NHA; 18	DOV; 16	TAL; 6	**CLT**; 4	KAN; 27	MAR; 10	TEX; 10	PHO; 7	HOM; 5	5th	2332	
2013	Roush Fenway Racing	16	Ford	DAY; 6	PHO; 17	LVS; 17	BRI; 11	CAL; 6	MAR; 9	TEX; 4	KAN; 19	RCH; 36	TAL; 36	DAR; 13	CLT; 31	DOV; 15	POC; 2	MCH; 1*	SON; 8	KEN; 34	DAY; 17	NHA; 15	IND; 24	POC; 10	GLN; 16	MCH; 9	BRI; 9	ATL; 15	RCH; 12	CHI; 16	NHA; 3	DOV; 9	KAN; 13	CLT; 16	TAL; 11	MAR; 9	TEX; 12	PHO; 13	HOM; 24	9th	2321	
2014	Roush Fenway Racing	16	Ford	DAY; 8	PHO; 17	LVS; 22	BRI; 12	CAL; 40	MAR; 18	TEX; 6	DAR; 5	RCH; 15	TAL; 2*	KAN; 16	CLT; 21	DOV; 38	POC; 16	MCH; 20	SON; 9	KEN; 14	DAY; 29	NHA; 15	IND; 13	POC; 5	GLN; 8	MCH; 10	BRI; 10	ATL; 10	RCH; 19	CHI; 23	NHA; 16	DOV; 21	KAN; 15	CLT; 18	TAL; 25	MAR; 13	TEX; 13	PHO; 9	HOM; 41	14th	2247	
2015	Roush Fenway Racing	16	Ford	DAY; 10	ATL; 25	LVS; 14	PHO; 27	CAL; 32	MAR; 19	TEX; 17	BRI; 30	RCH; 21	TAL; 37	KAN; 12	CLT; 2	DOV; 17	POC; 12	MCH; 36	SON; 27	DAY; 20	KEN; 16	NHA; 27	IND; 19	POC; 5	GLN; 14	MCH; 23	BRI; 25	DAR; 18	RCH; 31	CHI; 21	NHA; 4	DOV; 13	CLT; 24	KAN; 17	TAL; 20	MAR; 26	TEX; 19	PHO; 25	HOM; 16	20th	869	
2016	Roush Fenway Racing	16	Ford	DAY; 34	ATL; 13	LVS; 20	PHO; 21	CAL; 37	MAR; 12	TEX; 39	BRI; 12	RCH; 14	TAL; 20	KAN; 27	DOV; 29	CLT; 11	POC; 26	MCH; 19	SON; 18	**DAY**; 8	KEN; 6	NHA; 5	IND; 39	POC; 25	GLN; 39	BRI; 16	MCH; 11	DAR; 36	RCH; 23	CHI; 26	NHA; 33	DOV; 18	CLT; 35	KAN; 25	TAL; 15	MAR; 13	TEX; 18	PHO; 16	HOM; 17	23rd	691	
2022	NY Racing Team	44	Chevy	DAY; 36	CAL	LVS; 34	PHO	ATL; 20	COA	RCH; 37	MAR	BRD	TAL; 35	DOV	DAR	KAN	CLT	GTW	SON	NSH	ROA	ATL	NHA	POC	IRC	MCH	RCH	GLN	DAY	DAR	KAN	BRI	TEX	TAL	ROV	LVS	HOM	MAR	PHO	35th	24	

– Biffle did not receive points for the 2022 Daytona 500.

===== Daytona 500 =====
Year	Team	Manufacturer	Start	Finish
2002	Roush Racing	Ford	DNQ	
2003	Roush Racing	Ford	27	21
2004	Roush Racing	Ford	**1**	12
2005	Roush Racing	Ford	23	25
2006	Roush Racing	Ford	16	31
2007	Roush Fenway Racing	Ford	25	25
2008	Roush Fenway Racing	Ford	18	10
2009	Roush Fenway Racing	Ford	35	20
2010	Roush Fenway Racing	Ford	23	3
2011	Roush Fenway Racing	Ford	26	35
2012	Roush Fenway Racing	Ford	2	3
2013	Roush Fenway Racing	Ford	5	6
2014	Roush Fenway Racing	Ford	25	8
2015	Roush Fenway Racing	Ford	8	10
2016	Roush Fenway Racing	Ford	15	34
2022	NY Racing Team	Chevrolet	28	36

==== Nationwide Series ====
NASCAR Nationwide Series results
Year	Team	No.	Make	1	2	3	4	5	6	7	8	9	10	11	12	13	14	15	16	17	18	19	20	21	22	23	24	25	26	27	28	29	30	31	32	33	34	35	NNSC	Pts	Ref
1996	Bown Racing	51	Chevy	DAY	CAR	RCH	ATL	NSV	DAR	BRI	HCY	NZH	CLT	DOV	SBO	MYB	GLN	MLW	NHA	TAL	IRP	MCH	BRI	DAR	RCH	DOV	CLT	CAR; 23	HOM; 36										75th	149	
1999	Team Yellow Racing	19	Chevy	DAY	CAR	LVS	ATL	DAR	TEX	NSV	BRI	TAL	CAL	NHA	RCH	NZH	CLT	DOV	SBO	GLN	MLW	MYB	PPR	GTW	IRP	MCH	BRI	DAR	RCH	DOV	CLT	CAR; DNQ	MEM	PHO	HOM				N/A	–	
2001	Roush Racing	60	Ford	DAY; 22	**CAR**; 3	**LVS**; 2	ATL; 2	DAR; 11	BRI; 30	TEX; 7	NSH; 1*	TAL; 9	CAL; 6*	RCH; 37	NHA; 11	NZH; 1	CLT; 6*	DOV; 9	KEN; 2	MLW; 1	GLN; 2	CHI; 39	**GTW**; 4	PPR; 5	IRP; 2*	MCH; 43	BRI; 18	DAR; 15	RCH; 35	DOV; 5	KAN; 3	CLT; 1	MEM; 20	PHO; 1*	CAR; 12	HOM; 3			4th	4509	
2002	Roush Racing	60	Ford	DAY; 22	CAR; 2	LVS; 9	DAR; 2	BRI; 5	TEX; 17	NSH; 33	TAL; 26	CAL; 10*	RCH; 3	NHA; 31	NZH; 27	CLT; 2*	DOV; 1*	**NSH**; 3	KEN; 2	**MLW**; 1*	DAY; 2	CHI; 8	GTW; 1	PPR; 2	**IRP**; 1	MCH; 42	BRI; 3	**DAR**; 4*	RCH; 6	DOV; 17	KAN; 4	CLT; 6	**MEM**; 34*	**ATL**; 5	CAR; 2	**PHO**; 3*	HOM; 4		1st	4924	
2003	Roush Racing	9	Ford	DAY	CAR	LVS	DAR	BRI	TEX	TAL	NSH	CAL	RCH	GTW	NZH	CLT; 12	DOV	NSH	KEN	MLW																			35th	1502	
2003	Evans Motorsports	7	Pontiac																		DAY; 23	CHI	NHA	PPR	IRP														35th	1502	
2003	Evans Motorsports	7	Chevy																							MCH; 21	BRI; 38	DAR; 29	RCH; 28	DOV; 11	KAN; 3	CLT; 1*	MEM; 39	**ATL**; 1	PHO; 10	CAR; 11	**HOM**; 13		35th	1502	
2004	Roush Racing	60	Ford	DAY; 11	CAR; 38	LVS; 10	DAR; 1*	**BRI**; 4	TEX; 34	NSH; 40	TAL; 21	CAL; 1	GTW; 7	RCH; 2	NZH; 32	**CLT**; 6	DOV; 1	NSH; 13	KEN; 2	MLW; 7	DAY; 2	CHI; 32	NHA; 30	PPR; 1	IRP; 5	MCH; 8	BRI; 33	CAL; 1*	RCH; 11	DOV; 14	KAN; 2	CLT; 4	MEM; 2	ATL; 5	PHO; 5	DAR; 37	HOM; 10		3rd	4568	
2005	Brewco Motorsports	66	Ford	DAY; 8	CAL; 40	MXC	LVS; 5	ATL; 6	NSH	BRI; 10	TEX; 2	PHO; 1*	TAL; 36	DAR; 4	RCH; 5	CLT; 4	DOV; 8	NSH	KEN; 30	MLW	DAY; 3	CHI; 2	NHA; 31	PPR	GTW	IRP	GLN; 12	MCH; 2	BRI; 2	CAL; 2	RCH; 10	DOV; 5	KAN; 2*	CLT; 36	MEM	TEX; 2	PHO; 5	HOM; 2	10th	3865	
2006	Roush Racing	16	Ford	DAY; 31	CAL; 1*	MXC	LVS; 4	ATL; 3	BRI; 28	TEX; 2	NSH	PHO; 6	TAL; 6	RCH; 4	DAR; 5	CLT; 12	DOV; 8				DAY; 9	CHI; 24	NHA; 10			IRP; 4		MCH; 43	BRI; 37	CAL; 23	RCH; 2	DOV; 8	KAN; 8	CLT; 41	MEM	TEX; 23	PHO; 12	HOM; 38	9th	3789	
2006	Brewco Motorsports	66	Ford															NSH; 7	KEN; 17	MLW				MAR; 4	GTW		GLN; 4												9th	3789	
2007	Roush Fenway Racing	26	Ford	DAY; 10																																			9th	3466	
2007	Roush Fenway Racing	16	Ford		CAL; 5		LVS; 38				TEX; 36		TAL; 30	RCH; 6		CLT; 21	DOV; 18					DAY; 37	CHI; 39	GTW	IRP; 2*			**MCH**; 5		CAL; 32	RCH; 13	**DOV**; 9	KAN; 10	**CLT**; 30	MEM	TEX; 16	PHO; 36	HOM; 6	9th	3466	
2007	Brewco Motorsports	37	Ford			MXC; 20		ATL; 40	BRI; 7	NSH		PHO; 6			DAR; 8			NSH; 28	KEN; 10	MLW	NHA; 7					CGV; 20	GLN; 11		BRI; 14										9th	3466	
2008	Roush Fenway Racing	16	Ford	DAY; 7	CAL	LVS; 2		BRI; 13	NSH	TEX	PHO	MXC	TAL; 11	RCH	DAR	CLT; 7	DOV; 5	NSH; 10	KEN	MLW	NHA; 19	DAY	CHI; 6	GTW	IRP	CGV; 8	GLN	MCH; 5	BRI; 3	CAL	RCH; 6	DOV	KAN; 18	CLT	MEM	TEX	PHO	HOM	25th	2092	
2008	Brewco Motorsports	37	Ford				ATL; 21																																25th	2092	
2009	Roush Fenway Racing	16	Ford	DAY; 5	CAL; 34	LVS; 1*	BRI	TEX	NSH	PHO; 1*	TAL	RCH	DAR	CLT; 12	DOV; 25	NSH	KEN	MLW	NHA; 7	DAY	CHI; 7	GTW	IRP	IOW	GLN; 7	MCH; 8	BRI	CGV	ATL; 8	RCH; 12	DOV	KAN; 5	CAL; 14	CLT	MEM	TEX	PHO	HOM	24th	1966	
2010	Baker Curb Racing	27	Ford	DAY; 26	CAL; 2	LVS; 9	BRI; 6	NSH	PHO; 5	TEX; 7	TAL	RCH; 2	DAR; 35	DOV; 8	CLT; 13	NSH	KEN	ROA	NHA	DAY	CHI	GTW	IRP	IOW	GLN	MCH	BRI	CGV	ATL	RCH	DOV	KAN	CAL	CLT	GTW	TEX	PHO	HOM	35th	1368	

==== Gander RV & Outdoors Truck Series ====
NASCAR Gander RV & Outdoors Truck Series results
Year	Team	No.	Make	1	2	3	4	5	6	7	8	9	10	11	12	13	14	15	16	17	18	19	20	21	22	23	24	25	26	27	NGTC	Pts	Ref
1998	Roush Racing	80	Ford	WDW; 5																											8th	3872	
1998	Roush Racing	50	Ford		HOM; 4	PHO; 36	**POR**; 26	EVG; 17	I70; 21	GLN; 27	TEX; 22	BRI; 29	MLW; 5	NZH; 30	CAL; 7	PPR; 17	IRP; 7	NHA; 2	FLM; 24	NSV; 4	HPT; 21	LVL; 8	RCH; 3	**MEM**; 22*	**GTW**; 19	**MAR**; 8*	SON; 20	MMR; 14	PHO; 2	LVS; 5	8th	3872	
1999	Roush Racing	50	Ford	HOM; 11	PHO; 11	EVG; 10	MMR; 24	MAR; 5	**MEM**; 1	PPR; 14	I70; 10	**BRI**; 9	TEX; 3	PIR; 1	GLN; 4	**MLW**; 1*	NSV; 22	**NZH**; 1	MCH; 1*	NHA; 4	IRP; 1	GTW; 1	HPT; 8	RCH; 1	LVS; 1	LVL; 14	TEX; 2	CAL; 7			2nd	3739	
2000	Roush Racing	50	Ford	DAY; 11	HOM; 5*	PHO; 5	MMR; 12	MAR; 14	**PIR**; 13	**GTW**; 4	MEM; 2	PPR; 1*	EVG; 4	**TEX**; 1*	KEN; 1*	**GLN**; 1*	MLW; 3	NHA; 4	NZH; 3	MCH; 1*	IRP; 5	NSV; 14	CIC; 2*	RCH; 2	DOV; 2	TEX; 25	CAL; 5				1st	3826	
2001	Roush Racing	99	Ford	DAY	HOM	MMR	MAR	GTW	DAR	PPR	DOV	TEX	MEM; 9	MLW	KAN	KEN	NHA	IRP	NSH; 7	CIC	NZH; 1*	RCH	SBO	TEX	LVS	PHO; 1*	CAL				41st	664	
2004	Circle Bar Racing	44	Ford	DAY	ATL	MAR	MFD	CLT	DOV	TEX	MEM	MLW	KAN	KEN	GTW	MCH	IRP	NSH	BRI	RCH	NHA	LVS	CAL	TEX	MAR	PHO	DAR	HOM; 8			77th	142	
2019	Kyle Busch Motorsports	51	Toyota	DAY	ATL	LVS	MAR	TEX	DOV	KAN	CLT	TEX; 1	IOW	GTW	CHI	KEN	POC	ELD	MCH	BRI	MSP	LVS	TAL	MAR	PHO	HOM					53rd	45	
2020	GMS Racing	24	Chevy	DAY	LVS	CLT	ATL	HOM	POC	KEN	TEX	KAN	KAN	MCH	DRC	DOV	GTW	DAR; 19	RCH	BRI	LVS	TAL	KAN	TEX	MAR	PHO					63rd	18	

^{*} Season still in progress
^{1} Ineligible for series points

=== ARCA Menards Series West ===
ARCA Menards Series West results
Year	Team	No.	Make	1	2	3	4	5	6	7	8	9	10	11	12	13	14	15	AMSWC	Pts	Ref
1996	Kieper Racing	98	Chevy	TUS; 30	AMP; 4	MMR	SON	MAD	POR	TUS	EVG	CNS	MAD	MMR	SON	MMR	PHO	LVS	38th	238	
2024	Sigma Performance Services	23	Chevy	PHO	KER	PIR	SON	IRW	IRW	SHA	TRI; 9	MAD	AAS	KER	PHO				50th	35	
2025	Sigma Performance Services	23	Chevy	KER	PHO	TUC	CNS	KER	SON	TRI; 3									25th	82	
2025	Sigma Performance Services	24	Chevy								PIR; 4	AAS	MAD	LVS	PHO				25th	82	

=== International Race of Champions ===
(key) (Bold – Pole position. * – Most laps led.)

International Race of Champions results
Season	Make	1	2	3	4	Pos.	Points	Ref
2003	Pontiac	DAY; 5	TAL; 3	CHI; 6	IND; 7	7th	41	

=== 24 Hours of Daytona ===
(key)

24 Hours of Daytona results
Year	Class	No	Team	Car	Co-drivers	Laps	Position	Class Pos.
2005	DP	49	(United States) Multimatic Motorsports	Ford Multimatic DP	(Canada) Scott Maxwell (United States) Kurt Busch (United States) Matt Kenseth	588	27 ^{DNF}	15 ^{DNF}

=== Stadium Super Trucks ===
(key) (Bold – Pole position. Italics – Fastest qualifier. * – Most laps led.)

Stadium Super Trucks results
Year	1	2	3	4	5	6	7	8	9	10	11	12	13	14	15	16	17	18	19	20	SSTC	Pts	Ref
2018	ELS	ADE	ADE	ADE	LBH	LBH	BAR	BAR	DET	DET	TEX	TEX	ROA; 7^{†}	ROA; 2^{†}	SMP	SMP	HLN	HLN	MXC	MXC	N/A	—	
2019	COA	COA	TEX	TEX	LBH	LBH	TOR	TOR	MOH; 2	MOH; 4	MOH	MOH	ROA	ROA	ROA	POR; 3	POR; 8	SRF; 4	SRF; 8		9th	105	
2021	STP	STP	MOH; 4	MOH; 2	MOH	MOH	NSH	NSH	LBH	LBH											13th	42	
^{†} – Replaced Bill Hynes, points went to Hynes

=== Superstar Racing Experience ===
(key) * – Most laps led. ^{1} – Heat 1 winner. ^{2} – Heat 2 winner.

Superstar Racing Experience results
Year	No.	1	2	3	4	5	6	SRXC	Pts
2021	69	STA; 2^{1}	KNX	ELD	IRP	SLG; 8^{2}	NSV	12th	63
2022	69	FIF; 6	SBO; 2^{1}	STA; 10	NSV; 9	I55; 5	SHA; 6	5th	150
2023	69	STA	STA II; 5	MMI	BER	ELD	LOS	14th	^{1}

^{*} Season still in progress

== See also ==
- List of all-time NASCAR Cup Series winners
- List of animal rights advocates
- List of Daytona 500 pole position winners
- List of NASCAR Camping World Truck Series champions
- List of NASCAR Nationwide Series champions
- List of NASCAR Sprint All-Star Race drivers
- List of people from Washington (state)

Sporting positions
Preceded by Kevin Harvick	NASCAR Busch Series Champion; 2002	Succeeded by Brian Vickers
Preceded by Jack Sprague	NASCAR Craftsman Truck Series Champion; 2000	Succeeded by Jack Sprague
Achievements
Preceded by Jimmie Johnson	Southern 500 Winner; 2005, 2006	Succeeded by Jeff Gordon
Preceded by Kevin Harvick	NASCAR Busch Series Rookie of the Year; 2001	Succeeded by Scott Riggs
Preceded by Kenny Irwin Jr.	Craftsman Truck Series Rookie of the Year; 1998	Succeeded by Mike Stefanik
