= 2003 Pepsi 400 =

Race details
- Race 17 of 36 in the 2003 NASCAR Winston Cup Series
- Daytona International Speedway
- Date: July 5, 2003
- Location: Daytona International Speedway, Daytona Beach, Florida
- Course: Permanent racing facility
- Course length: 2.5 miles (4.023 km)
- Distance: 160 laps, 400 mi (643.737 km)
- Average speed: 166.109 mph (267.327 km/h)

Pole position
Driver	Steve Park	Richard Childress Racing

Most laps led
Driver	Kevin Harvick	Richard Childress Racing
- Laps: 54

Winner
No. 16	Greg Biffle	Roush Racing

Television in the United States
- Network: NBC
- Announcers: Allen Bestwick, Benny Parsons, Wally Dallenbach Jr.
- Nielsen ratings: 6.0/13

The 2003 Pepsi 400, was a NASCAR Winston Cup Series race held on July 5, 2003, at Daytona International Speedway in Daytona Beach, Florida. Contested over 160 laps on the 2.5-mile (4.0 km) asphalt superspeedway, it was the seventeenth race of the 2003 NASCAR Winston Cup Series season. Greg Biffle of Roush Racing won the race, earning his first career Winston Cup Series win.

== Background ==
Daytona International Speedway is a race track in Daytona Beach, Florida that is one of six superspeedways to hold NASCAR races, the others being Auto Club Speedway, Indianapolis Motor Speedway, Michigan International Speedway, Pocono Raceway and Talladega Superspeedway. The standard track at Daytona is a four-turn superspeedway that is 2.5 miles (4.0 km) long. The track also features two other layouts that utilize portions of the primary high speed tri-oval, such as a 3.56-mile (5.73 km) sports car course and a 2.95-mile (4.75 km) motorcycle course. The track's 180-acre (73 ha) infield includes the 29-acre (12 ha) Lake Lloyd, which has hosted powerboat racing. The speedway is owned and operated by International Speedway Corporation.

=== Entry list ===
No.	Driver	Team	Manufacturer
0	Jack Sprague	Haas CNC Racing	Pontiac
01	Mike Wallace	MB2 Motorsports	Pontiac
1	Jeff Green	Dale Earnhardt Inc.	Chevrolet
2	Rusty Wallace	Penske Racing	Dodge
4	Stacy Compton	Morgan–McClure Motorsports	Pontiac
5	Terry Labonte	Hendrick Motorsports	Chevrolet
6	Mark Martin	Roush Racing	Ford
7	Jimmy Spencer	Ultra Motorsports	Dodge
8	Dale Earnhardt Jr.	Dale Earnhardt, Inc.	Chevrolet
09	Buckshot Jones	Phoenix Racing	Dodge
9	Bill Elliott	Evernham Motorsports	Dodge
10	Johnny Benson Jr.	MB2 Motorsports	Pontiac
12	Ryan Newman	Penske Racing	Dodge
14	Larry Foyt	A. J. Foyt Enterprises	Dodge
15	Michael Waltrip	Dale Earnhardt Inc.	Chevrolet
16	Greg Biffle	Roush Racing	Ford
17	Matt Kenseth	Roush Racing	Ford
18	Bobby Labonte	Joe Gibbs Racing	Chevrolet
19	Jeremy Mayfield	Evernham Motorsports	Dodge
20	Tony Stewart	Joe Gibbs Racing	Chevrolet
21	Ricky Rudd	Wood Brothers Racing	Ford
22	Ward Burton	Bill Davis Racing	Dodge
23	Kenny Wallace	Bill Davis Racing	Dodge
24	Jeff Gordon	Hendrick Motorsports	Chevrolet
25	Joe Nemechek	Hendrick Motorsports	Chevrolet
29	Kevin Harvick	Richard Childress Racing	Chevrolet
30	Steve Park	Richard Childress Racing	Chevrolet
31	Robby Gordon	Richard Childress Racing	Chevrolet
32	Ricky Craven	PPI Motorsports	Pontiac
38	Elliott Sadler	Robert Yates Racing	Ford
40	Sterling Marlin	Chip Ganassi Racing	Dodge
41	Casey Mears	Chip Ganassi Racing	Dodge
42	Jamie McMurray	Chip Ganassi Racing	Dodge
43	Shane Hmiel	Petty Enterprises	Dodge
44	Christian Fittipaldi	Petty Enterprises	Dodge
45	Kyle Petty	Petty Enterprises	Dodge
48	Jimmie Johnson	Hendrick Motorsports	Chevrolet
49	Ken Schrader	BAM Racing	Dodge
54	Todd Bodine	BelCar Motorsports	Ford
60	David Green	Hendrick Motorsports	Chevrolet
74	Tony Raines	BACE Motorsports	Chevrolet
77	Dave Blaney	Jasper Motorsports	Ford
88	Dale Jarrett	Robert Yates Racing	Ford
80	Mike Bliss	Joe Gibbs Racing	Chevrolet
83	Kerry Earnhardt	FitzBradshaw Racing	Chevrolet
97	Kurt Busch	Roush Racing	Ford
99	Jeff Burton	Roush Racing	Ford

== Results ==
Pos	Grid	No.	Driver	Team	Manufacturer	Laps	Laps Led
1	30	16	Greg Biffle	Roush Racing	Ford	160	21
2	36	99	Jeff Burton	Roush Racing	Ford	160	0
3	27	21	Ricky Rudd	Wood Brothers Racing	Ford	160	0
4	25	5	Terry Labonte	Hendrick Motorsports	Chevrolet	160	0
5	15	18	Bobby Labonte	Joe Gibbs Racing	Chevrolet	160	11
6	37	17	Matt Kenseth	Roush Racing	Ford	160	10
7	5	8	Dale Earnhardt Jr.	Dale Earnhardt, Inc.	Chevrolet	160	43
8	10	19	Jeremy Mayfield	Evernham Motorsports	Dodge	160	0
9	2	29	Kevin Harvick	Richard Childress Racing	Chevrolet	160	54
10	16	88	Dale Jarrett	Robert Yates Racing	Ford	160	0
11	6	15	Michael Waltrip	Dale Earnhardt Inc.	Chevrolet	160	9
12	40	7	Jimmy Spencer	Ultra Motorsports	Dodge	160	0
13	41	54	Todd Bodine	BelCar Motorsports	Ford	160	0
14	3	24	Jeff Gordon	Hendrick Motorsports	Chevrolet	160	1
15	29	23	Kenny Wallace	Bill Davis Racing	Dodge	160	0
16	14	9	Bill Elliott	Evernham Motorsports	Dodge	160	0
17	19	09	Buckshot Jones	Phoenix Racing	Dodge	160	0
18	11	48	Jimmie Johnson	Hendrick Motorsports	Chevrolet	160	3
19	4	40	Sterling Marlin	Chip Ganassi Racing	Dodge	160	0
20	33	6	Mark Martin	Roush Racing	Ford	160	0
21	13	20	Tony Stewart	Joe Gibbs Racing	Chevrolet	160	0
22	24	12	Ryan Newman	Penske Racing	Dodge	160	0
23	42	45	Kyle Petty	Petty Enterprises	Dodge	160	1
24	9	38	Elliott Sadler	Robert Yates Racing	Ford	159	4
25	12	41	Casey Mears	Chip Ganassi Racing	Dodge	159	0
26	32	80	Mike Bliss	Joe Gibbs Racing	Chevrolet	159	0
27	22	10	Johnny Benson Jr.	MB2 Motorsports	Pontiac	159	0
28	38	2	Rusty Wallace	Penske Racing	Dodge	159	0
29	34	1	Jeff Green	Dale Earnhardt Inc.	Chevrolet	159	0
30	28	22	Ward Burton	Bill Davis Racing	Dodge	159	3
31	35	0	Jack Sprague	Haas CNC Racing	Pontiac	159	0
32	21	60	David Green	Hendrick Motorsports	Chevrolet	157	0
33	43	4	Stacy Compton	Morgan–McClure Motorsports	Pontiac	157	0
34	26	14	Larry Foyt	A. J. Foyt Enterprises	Dodge	155	0
35	39	77	Dave Blaney	Jasper Motorsports	Ford	154	0
36	31	97	Kurt Busch	Roush Racing	Ford	151	0
37	8	42	Jamie McMurray	Chip Ganassi Racing	Dodge	143	0
38	20	25	Joe Nemechek	Hendrick Motorsports	Chevrolet	113	0
39	1	30	Steve Park	Richard Childress Racing	Chevrolet	112	0
40	18	31	Robby Gordon	Richard Childress Racing	Chevrolet	86	0
41	7	49	Ken Schrader	BAM Racing	Dodge	85	0
42	23	01	Mike Wallace	MB2 Motorsports	Pontiac	84	0
43	17	32	Ricky Craven	PPI Motorsports	Pontiac	79	0

=== Failed to qualify ===
- Shane Hmiel (#43)
- Christian Fittipaldi (#44)
- Tony Raines (#74)
- Kerry Earnhardt (#83)

=== Race statistics ===
- Time of race: 2:24:29
- Average speed: 166.109 mph (267.327 km/h)
- Pole speed: 184.752 mph (297.330 km/h)
- Cautions: 2 for 10 laps
- Margin of victory: 4.102 seconds
- Lead changes: 16
- Percent of race run under caution: 6.3%
- Average green flag run: 50 laps

Lap leaders
Laps	Leader
1–37	Kevin Harvick
38	Ward Burton
39–54	Kevin Harvick
55–63	Michael Waltrip
64	Jimmie Johnson
65	Kyle Petty
66–69	Elliott Sadler
70	Jimmie Johnson
71–101	Dale Earnhardt Jr.
102	Kevin Harvick
103	Jeff Gordon
104–105	Ward Burton
106–115	Matt Kenseth
116–126	Bobby Labonte
127–138	Dale Earnhardt Jr.
139	Jimmie Johnson
140–160	Greg Biffle

Total laps led
54	Kevin Harvick
43	Dale Earnhardt Jr.
21	Greg Biffle
11	Bobby Labonte
10	Matt Kenseth
9	Michael Waltrip
4	Elliott Sadler
3	Jimmie Johnson
3	Ward Burton
1	Jeff Gordon
1	Kyle Petty

Cautions: 2 for 10 laps
Laps	Reason
64–68	#77 (Dave Blaney) spun backstraight
75–79	#97 (Kurt Busch), #31 (Robby Gordon), #01 (Mike Wallace), #32 (Ricky Craven), #25 (Joe Nemechek), #42 (Jamie McMurray), and #30 (Steve Park) accident turn 2
