= 2002 Chevrolet Monte Carlo 400 =

26th race of the 2002 NASCAR Winston Cup Series

2002 Chevrolet Monte Carlo 400 with The Looney Tunes
Race details
- Race 26 of 36 in the 2002 NASCAR Winston Cup Series
- The 2002 Chevrolet Monte Carlo 400 program cover, featuring several Looney Tunes sponsored cars.
- Date: September 7, 2002
- Official name: 45th Annual Chevrolet Monte Carlo 400 with The Looney Tunes
- Location: Richmond, Virginia, Richmond International Raceway
- Course: Permanent racing facility
- Course length: 0.75 miles (1.21 km)
- Distance: 400 laps, 300 mi (482.803 km)
- Scheduled distance: 400 laps, 300 mi (482.803 km)
- Average speed: 94.787 miles per hour (152.545 km/h)

Pole position
Driver	Jimmie Johnson	Hendrick Motorsports
- Time: 21.404

Most laps led
Driver	Ryan Newman	Penske Racing
- Laps: 145

Winner
No. 17	Matt Kenseth	Roush Racing

Television in the United States
- Network: TNT
- Announcers: Allen Bestwick, Benny Parsons, Wally Dallenbach Jr.

Radio in the United States
- Radio: Motor Racing Network

The 2002 Chevrolet Monte Carlo 400 with The Looney Tunes was the 26th stock car race of the 2002 NASCAR Winston Cup Series and the 45th iteration of the event. The race was held on Saturday, September 7, 2002, in Richmond, Virginia, at Richmond International Raceway, a 0.75 miles (1.21 km) D-shaped oval. The race took the scheduled 400 laps to complete. At race's end, Matt Kenseth, driving for Roush Racing, would come back from a two-lap deficit to win his fifth career NASCAR Winston Cup Series win and his fourth of the season. To fill out the podium, Ryan Newman of Penske Racing and Jeff Green of Richard Childress Racing would finish second and third, respectively.

== Background ==
The layout of Richmond International Raceway, the venue where the race was at.

Richmond International Raceway (RIR) is a 3/4-mile (1.2 km), D-shaped, asphalt race track located just outside Richmond, Virginia.

=== Entry list ===
- (R) denotes rookie driver.

#	Driver	Team	Make
1	Steve Park	Dale Earnhardt, Inc.	Chevrolet
2	Rusty Wallace	Penske Racing	Ford
02	Hermie Sadler	SCORE Motorsports	Chevrolet
4	Mike Skinner	Morgan–McClure Motorsports	Chevrolet
5	Terry Labonte	Hendrick Motorsports	Chevrolet
6	Mark Martin	Roush Racing	Ford
7	Casey Atwood	Ultra-Evernham Motorsports	Dodge
8	Dale Earnhardt Jr.	Dale Earnhardt, Inc.	Chevrolet
9	Bill Elliott	Evernham Motorsports	Dodge
09	Geoff Bodine	Phoenix Racing	Ford
10	Johnny Benson Jr.	MBV Motorsports	Pontiac
11	Brett Bodine	Brett Bodine Racing	Ford
12	Ryan Newman (R)	Penske Racing	Ford
14	Mike Wallace	A. J. Foyt Enterprises	Pontiac
15	Michael Waltrip	Dale Earnhardt, Inc.	Chevrolet
17	Matt Kenseth	Roush Racing	Ford
18	Bobby Labonte	Joe Gibbs Racing	Pontiac
19	Jeremy Mayfield	Evernham Motorsports	Dodge
20	Tony Stewart	Joe Gibbs Racing	Pontiac
21	Elliott Sadler	Wood Brothers Racing	Ford
22	Ward Burton	Bill Davis Racing	Dodge
23	Hut Stricklin	Bill Davis Racing	Dodge
24	Jeff Gordon	Hendrick Motorsports	Chevrolet
25	Joe Nemechek	Hendrick Motorsports	Chevrolet
26	Todd Bodine	Haas-Carter Motorsports	Ford
28	Ricky Rudd	Robert Yates Racing	Ford
29	Kevin Harvick	Richard Childress Racing	Chevrolet
30	Jeff Green	Richard Childress Racing	Chevrolet
31	Robby Gordon	Richard Childress Racing	Chevrolet
32	Ricky Craven	PPI Motorsports	Ford
36	Ken Schrader	MB2 Motorsports	Pontiac
40	Sterling Marlin	Chip Ganassi Racing	Dodge
41	Jimmy Spencer	Chip Ganassi Racing	Dodge
43	John Andretti	Petty Enterprises	Dodge
44	Jerry Nadeau	Petty Enterprises	Dodge
45	Kyle Petty	Petty Enterprises	Dodge
48	Jimmie Johnson (R)	Hendrick Motorsports	Chevrolet
51	Carl Long (R)	Ware Racing Enterprises	Dodge
55	Greg Biffle	Andy Petree Racing	Chevrolet
71	Tim Sauter	Marcis Auto Racing	Chevrolet
77	Dave Blaney	Jasper Motorsports	Ford
88	Dale Jarrett	Robert Yates Racing	Ford
97	Kurt Busch	Roush Racing	Ford
99	Jeff Burton	Roush Racing	Ford
Official entry list

== Practice ==
=== First practice ===
The first practice session was held on Friday, September 6, at 11:20 AM EST, and lasted for 2 hours. Ryan Newman of Penske Racing would set the fastest time in the session, with a lap of 21.279 and an average speed of 126.886 mph (204.203 km/h).

Pos.	#	Driver	Team	Make	Time	Speed
1	12	Ryan Newman (R)	Penske Racing	Ford	21.279	126.886
2	30	Jeff Green	Richard Childress Racing	Chevrolet	21.287	126.838
3	20	Tony Stewart	Joe Gibbs Racing	Pontiac	21.292	126.808
Full first practice results

=== Second practice ===
The second practice session was held on Friday, September 6, at 4:45 PM EST, and lasted for 45 minutes. Jeff Green of Richard Childress Racing would set the fastest time in the session, with a lap of 21.577 and an average speed of 125.133 mph (201.382 km/h).

Pos.	#	Driver	Team	Make	Time	Speed
1	30	Jeff Green	Richard Childress Racing	Chevrolet	21.577	125.133
2	6	Mark Martin	Roush Racing	Ford	21.634	124.803
3	48	Jimmie Johnson (R)	Hendrick Motorsports	Chevrolet	21.645	124.740
Full second practice results

=== Final practice ===
The final practice session was held on Friday, September 6, at 6:15 PM EST, and lasted for 45 minutes. Rusty Wallace of Penske Racing would set the fastest time in the session, with a lap of 21.590 and an average speed of 125.058 mph (201.261 km/h).

During the session, Jeff Gordon would careen his car into the outside wall in Turn 2, causing substantial damage to his car and forcing Gordon to use a backup. The special Bugs Bunny scheme that was planned to run was instead replaced by Gordon's regular "Flames" scheme, with Gordon saying "We're going to go with the flames. [My firesuit] is about all that is left of Bugs for the day."

Pos.	#	Driver	Team	Make	Time	Speed
1	2	Rusty Wallace	Penske Racing	Ford	21.590	125.058
2	30	Jeff Green	Richard Childress Racing	Chevrolet	21.618	124.896
3	55	Greg Biffle	Andy Petree Racing	Chevrolet	21.619	124.890
Full Final practice results

== Qualifying ==
Qualifying was held on Friday, September 6, at 3:05 PM EST. Each driver would have two laps to set a fastest time; the fastest of the two would count as their official qualifying lap. Positions 1-36 would be decided on time, while positions 37-43 would be based on provisionals. Six spots are awarded by the use of provisionals based on owner's points. The seventh is awarded to a past champion who has not otherwise qualified for the race. If no past champion needs the provisional, the next team in the owner points will be awarded a provisional.

Jimmie Johnson of Hendrick Motorsports would win the pole, setting a time of 21.404 and an average speed of 126.145 miles per hour (203.011 km/h).

Carl Long was the only driver to fail to qualify.

=== Full qualifying results ===
Pos.	#	Driver	Team	Make	Time	Speed
1	48	Jimmie Johnson (R)	Hendrick Motorsports	Chevrolet	21.404	126.145
2	12	Ryan Newman (R)	Penske Racing	Ford	21.474	125.733
3	77	Dave Blaney	Jasper Motorsports	Ford	21.474	125.733
4	6	Mark Martin	Roush Racing	Ford	21.476	125.722
5	5	Terry Labonte	Hendrick Motorsports	Chevrolet	21.479	125.704
6	28	Ricky Rudd	Robert Yates Racing	Ford	21.496	125.605
7	26	Todd Bodine	Haas-Carter Motorsports	Ford	21.501	125.576
8	4	Mike Skinner	Morgan–McClure Motorsports	Chevrolet	21.505	125.552
9	10	Johnny Benson Jr.	MBV Motorsports	Pontiac	21.506	125.546
10	24	Jeff Gordon	Hendrick Motorsports	Chevrolet	21.507	125.540
11	31	Robby Gordon	Richard Childress Racing	Chevrolet	21.510	125.523
12	88	Dale Jarrett	Robert Yates Racing	Ford	21.514	125.500
13	22	Ward Burton	Bill Davis Racing	Dodge	21.517	125.482
14	20	Tony Stewart	Joe Gibbs Racing	Pontiac	21.530	125.406
15	99	Jeff Burton	Roush Racing	Ford	21.538	125.360
16	36	Ken Schrader	MB2 Motorsports	Pontiac	21.547	125.308
17	44	Jerry Nadeau	Petty Enterprises	Dodge	21.565	125.203
18	18	Bobby Labonte	Joe Gibbs Racing	Pontiac	21.571	125.168
19	9	Bill Elliott	Evernham Motorsports	Dodge	21.577	125.133
20	32	Ricky Craven	PPI Motorsports	Ford	21.577	125.133
21	19	Jeremy Mayfield	Evernham Motorsports	Dodge	21.611	124.936
22	97	Kurt Busch	Roush Racing	Ford	21.622	124.873
23	2	Rusty Wallace	Penske Racing	Ford	21.655	124.683
24	8	Dale Earnhardt Jr.	Dale Earnhardt, Inc.	Chevrolet	21.657	124.671
25	17	Matt Kenseth	Roush Racing	Ford	21.677	124.556
26	15	Michael Waltrip	Dale Earnhardt, Inc.	Chevrolet	21.685	124.510
27	29	Kevin Harvick	Richard Childress Racing	Chevrolet	21.686	124.504
28	25	Joe Nemechek	Hendrick Motorsports	Chevrolet	21.690	124.481
29	30	Jeff Green	Richard Childress Racing	Chevrolet	21.698	124.435
30	41	Jimmy Spencer	Chip Ganassi Racing	Dodge	21.707	124.384
31	43	John Andretti	Petty Enterprises	Dodge	21.708	124.378
32	40	Sterling Marlin	Chip Ganassi Racing	Dodge	21.709	124.372
33	23	Kenny Wallace	Bill Davis Racing	Dodge	21.716	124.332
34	7	Casey Atwood	Ultra-Evernham Motorsports	Dodge	21.723	124.292
35	21	Elliott Sadler	Wood Brothers Racing	Ford	21.724	124.286
36	45	Kyle Petty	Petty Enterprises	Dodge	21.739	124.201
Provisionals
37	55	Greg Biffle	Andy Petree Racing	Chevrolet	21.761	124.075
38	1	Steve Park	Dale Earnhardt, Inc.	Chevrolet	21.772	124.012
39	14	Mike Wallace	A. J. Foyt Enterprises	Pontiac	21.865	123.485
40	11	Brett Bodine	Brett Bodine Racing	Ford	21.740	124.195
41	09	Geoff Bodine	Phoenix Racing	Ford	21.748	124.149
42	71	Tim Sauter	Marcis Auto Racing	Chevrolet	22.028	122.571
43	02	Hermie Sadler	SCORE Motorsports	Chevrolet	22.283	121.169
Failed to qualify
44	51	Carl Long (R)	Ware Racing Enterprises	Dodge	21.836	123.649
Official qualifying results

== Race results ==
Fin	St	#	Driver	Team	Make	Laps	Led	Status	Pts	Winnings
1	25	17	Matt Kenseth	Roush Racing	Ford	400	134	running	180	$163,595
2	2	12	Ryan Newman (R)	Penske Racing	Ford	400	145	running	180	$127,340
3	29	30	Jeff Green	Richard Childress Racing	Chevrolet	400	2	running	145	$80,930
4	24	8	Dale Earnhardt Jr.	Dale Earnhardt, Inc.	Chevrolet	400	0	running	160	$87,205
5	7	26	Todd Bodine	Haas-Carter Motorsports	Ford	400	0	running	155	$92,142
6	4	6	Mark Martin	Roush Racing	Ford	400	0	running	150	$87,288
7	6	28	Ricky Rudd	Robert Yates Racing	Ford	400	0	running	146	$92,222
8	13	22	Ward Burton	Bill Davis Racing	Dodge	399	16	running	147	$89,855
9	3	77	Dave Blaney	Jasper Motorsports	Ford	399	0	running	138	$72,655
10	21	19	Jeremy Mayfield	Evernham Motorsports	Dodge	399	0	running	134	$60,755
11	38	1	Steve Park	Dale Earnhardt, Inc.	Chevrolet	399	31	running	135	$79,230
12	39	14	Mike Wallace	A. J. Foyt Enterprises	Pontiac	399	1	running	132	$52,940
13	1	48	Jimmie Johnson (R)	Hendrick Motorsports	Chevrolet	399	1	running	129	$52,380
14	33	23	Kenny Wallace	Bill Davis Racing	Dodge	399	3	running	126	$47,080
15	23	2	Rusty Wallace	Penske Racing	Ford	399	0	running	118	$87,755
16	19	9	Bill Elliott	Evernham Motorsports	Dodge	399	0	running	115	$74,211
17	36	45	Kyle Petty	Petty Enterprises	Dodge	399	0	running	112	$47,855
18	27	29	Kevin Harvick	Richard Childress Racing	Chevrolet	399	0	running	109	$88,283
19	22	97	Kurt Busch	Roush Racing	Ford	398	0	running	106	$53,780
20	40	11	Brett Bodine	Brett Bodine Racing	Ford	398	0	running	103	$61,680
21	20	32	Ricky Craven	PPI Motorsports	Ford	398	0	running	100	$52,805
22	8	4	Mike Skinner	Morgan–McClure Motorsports	Chevrolet	398	0	running	97	$55,080
23	43	02	Hermie Sadler	SCORE Motorsports	Chevrolet	398	0	running	94	$41,305
24	34	7	Casey Atwood	Ultra-Evernham Motorsports	Dodge	397	0	running	91	$52,544
25	28	25	Joe Nemechek	Hendrick Motorsports	Chevrolet	397	0	running	88	$52,005
26	16	36	Ken Schrader	MB2 Motorsports	Pontiac	397	0	running	85	$51,780
27	17	44	Jerry Nadeau	Petty Enterprises	Dodge	397	0	running	82	$40,755
28	11	31	Robby Gordon	Richard Childress Racing	Chevrolet	397	0	running	79	$66,686
29	31	43	John Andretti	Petty Enterprises	Dodge	397	0	running	76	$67,593
30	14	20	Tony Stewart	Joe Gibbs Racing	Pontiac	396	34	driveshaft	78	$88,478
31	12	88	Dale Jarrett	Robert Yates Racing	Ford	392	0	running	70	$60,365
32	18	18	Bobby Labonte	Joe Gibbs Racing	Pontiac	371	0	running	67	$86,108
33	37	55	Greg Biffle	Andy Petree Racing	Chevrolet	334	12	running	69	$48,295
34	35	21	Elliott Sadler	Wood Brothers Racing	Ford	317	0	running	61	$48,235
35	9	10	Johnny Benson Jr.	MBV Motorsports	Pontiac	251	0	crash	58	$66,950
36	26	15	Michael Waltrip	Dale Earnhardt, Inc.	Chevrolet	217	21	crash	60	$48,165
37	42	71	Tim Sauter	Marcis Auto Racing	Chevrolet	215	0	engine	52	$40,130
38	41	09	Geoff Bodine	Phoenix Racing	Ford	116	0	engine	49	$40,095
39	15	99	Jeff Burton	Roush Racing	Ford	107	0	running	46	$84,702
40	10	24	Jeff Gordon	Hendrick Motorsports	Chevrolet	84	0	engine	43	$92,953
41	5	5	Terry Labonte	Hendrick Motorsports	Chevrolet	15	0	crash	40	$68,763
42	30	41	Jimmy Spencer	Chip Ganassi Racing	Dodge	8	0	crash	37	$39,880
43	32	40	Sterling Marlin	Chip Ganassi Racing	Dodge	8	0	crash	34	$82,429
Official race results

Previous race: 2002 Mountain Dew Southern 500	NASCAR Winston Cup Series; 2002 season	Next race: 2002 New Hampshire 300
