= 2002 New Hampshire 300 =

27th race of the 2002 NASCAR Winston Cup Series

Race details
- Race 27 of 36 in the 2002 NASCAR Winston Cup Series
- The 2002 New Hampshire 300 program cover.
- Date: September 15, 2002
- Official name: Sixth Annual New Hampshire 300
- Location: Loudon, New Hampshire, New Hampshire International Speedway
- Course: Permanent racing facility
- Course length: 1.058 miles (1.703 km)
- Distance: 207 laps, 219.006 mi (352.455 km)
- Scheduled distance: 300 laps, 317.4 mi (510.805 km)
- Average speed: 105.081 miles per hour (169.111 km/h)

Pole position
Driver	Ryan Newman	Penske Racing
- Time: 28.802

Most laps led
Driver	Ryan Newman	Penske Racing
- Laps: 143

Winner
No. 12	Ryan Newman	Penske Racing

Television in the United States
- Network: TNT
- Announcers: Allen Bestwick, Benny Parsons, Wally Dallenbach Jr.

Radio in the United States
- Radio: Motor Racing Network

The 2002 New Hampshire 300 was the 27th stock car race of the 2002 NASCAR Winston Cup Series and the sixth iteration of the event. The race was held on Sunday, September 15, 2002, in Loudon, New Hampshire, at New Hampshire International Speedway, a 1.058-mile (1.703 km) permanent, oval-shaped, low-banked racetrack. The race was shortened from its scheduled 300 laps to 207 due to darkness. At race's end, Ryan Newman, driving for Penske Racing, would dominate the race until the end to win his first career NASCAR Winston Cup Series win and his only win of the season. To fill out the podium, Kurt Busch of Roush Racing and Tony Stewart of Joe Gibbs Racing would finish second and third, respectively.

== Background ==
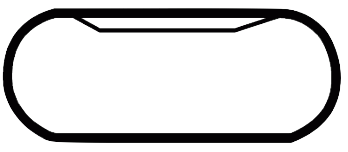
The layout of New Hampshire International Speedway, the venue where the race was held.

New Hampshire International Speedway is a 1.058-mile (1.703 km) oval speedway located in Loudon, New Hampshire which has hosted NASCAR racing annually since the early 1990s, as well as an IndyCar weekend and the oldest motorcycle race in North America, the Loudon Classic. Nicknamed "The Magic Mile", the speedway is often converted into a 1.6-mile (2.6 km) road course, which includes much of the oval. The track was originally the site of Bryar Motorsports Park before being purchased and redeveloped by Bob Bahre. The track is currently one of eight major NASCAR tracks owned and operated by Speedway Motorsports.

=== Entry list ===
- (R) denotes rookie driver.

#	Driver	Team	Make
1	Steve Park	Dale Earnhardt, Inc.	Chevrolet
2	Rusty Wallace	Penske Racing	Ford
02	Hermie Sadler	SCORE Motorsports	Chevrolet
4	Mike Skinner	Morgan–McClure Motorsports	Chevrolet
5	Terry Labonte	Hendrick Motorsports	Chevrolet
6	Mark Martin	Roush Racing	Ford
7	Casey Atwood	Ultra-Evernham Motorsports	Dodge
8	Dale Earnhardt Jr.	Dale Earnhardt, Inc.	Chevrolet
9	Bill Elliott	Evernham Motorsports	Dodge
10	Johnny Benson Jr.	MBV Motorsports	Pontiac
11	Brett Bodine	Brett Bodine Racing	Ford
12	Ryan Newman (R)	Penske Racing	Ford
14	Mike Wallace	A. J. Foyt Enterprises	Pontiac
15	Michael Waltrip	Dale Earnhardt, Inc.	Chevrolet
17	Matt Kenseth	Roush Racing	Ford
18	Bobby Labonte	Joe Gibbs Racing	Pontiac
19	Jeremy Mayfield	Evernham Motorsports	Dodge
20	Tony Stewart	Joe Gibbs Racing	Pontiac
21	Elliott Sadler	Wood Brothers Racing	Ford
22	Ward Burton	Bill Davis Racing	Dodge
23	Kenny Wallace	Bill Davis Racing	Dodge
24	Jeff Gordon	Hendrick Motorsports	Chevrolet
25	Joe Nemechek	Hendrick Motorsports	Chevrolet
26	Todd Bodine	Haas-Carter Motorsports	Ford
28	Ricky Rudd	Robert Yates Racing	Ford
29	Kevin Harvick	Richard Childress Racing	Chevrolet
30	Jeff Green	Richard Childress Racing	Chevrolet
31	Robby Gordon	Richard Childress Racing	Chevrolet
32	Ricky Craven	PPI Motorsports	Ford
36	Ken Schrader	MB2 Motorsports	Pontiac
37	Kevin Lepage	Quest Motor Racing	Ford
40	Sterling Marlin	Chip Ganassi Racing	Dodge
41	Jimmy Spencer	Chip Ganassi Racing	Dodge
43	John Andretti	Petty Enterprises	Dodge
44	Jerry Nadeau	Petty Enterprises	Dodge
45	Kyle Petty	Petty Enterprises	Dodge
48	Jimmie Johnson (R)	Hendrick Motorsports	Chevrolet
51	Carl Long (R)	Ware Racing Enterprises	Dodge
55	Greg Biffle	Andy Petree Racing	Chevrolet
77	Dave Blaney	Jasper Motorsports	Ford
88	Dale Jarrett	Robert Yates Racing	Ford
89	Morgan Shepherd	Shepherd Racing Ventures	Ford
97	Kurt Busch	Roush Racing	Ford
99	Jeff Burton	Roush Racing	Ford
Official entry list

== Practice ==
=== First practice ===
The first practice session was held on Friday, September 13, at 11:20 AM EST, and would last for 2 hours. Ryan Newman of Penske Racing would set the fastest time in the session, with a lap of 28.799 and an average speed of 132.255 mph (212.844 km/h).

Pos.	#	Driver	Team	Make	Time	Speed
1	12	Ryan Newman (R)	Penske Racing	Ford	28.799	132.255
2	10	Johnny Benson Jr.	MBV Motorsports	Pontiac	28.881	131.879
3	55	Greg Biffle	Andy Petree Racing	Chevrolet	28.895	131.815
Full first practice results

=== Second practice ===
The second practice session was held on Saturday, September 14, at 9:30 AM EST, and would last for 45 minutes. Ward Burton of Bill Davis Racing would set the fastest time in the session, with a lap of 29.421 and an average speed of 129.459 mph (208.344 km/h).

Pos.	#	Driver	Team	Make	Time	Speed
1	22	Ward Burton	Bill Davis Racing	Dodge	29.421	129.459
2	12	Ryan Newman (R)	Penske Racing	Ford	29.422	129.454
3	29	Kevin Harvick	Richard Childress Racing	Chevrolet	29.440	129.375
Full second practice results

=== Final practice ===
The final practice session was held on Saturday, September 14, at 11:15 AM EST, and would last for 45 minutes. Greg Biffle of Andy Petree Racing would set the fastest time in the session, with a lap of 29.350 and an average speed of 129.772 mph (208.848 km/h).

Pos.	#	Driver	Team	Make	Time	Speed
1	55	Greg Biffle	Andy Petree Racing	Chevrolet	29.350	129.772
2	10	Johnny Benson Jr.	MBV Motorsports	Pontiac	29.500	129.112
3	22	Ward Burton	Bill Davis Racing	Dodge	29.524	129.007
Full Happy Hour practice results

== Qualifying ==
Qualifying was held on Friday, September 13, at 3:05 PM EST. Each driver would have two laps to set a fastest time; the fastest of the two would count as their official qualifying lap. Positions 1-36 would be decided on time, while positions 37-43 would be based on provisionals. Six spots are awarded by the use of provisionals based on owner's points. The seventh is awarded to a past champion who has not otherwise qualified for the race. If no past champion needs the provisional, the next team in the owner points will be awarded a provisional.

Ryan Newman of Penske Racing would win the pole, setting a time of 28.802 and an average speed of 132.241 miles per hour (212.821 km/h).

Carl Long was the only driver to fail to qualify.

=== Full qualifying results ===
Pos.	#	Driver	Team	Make	Time	Speed
1	12	Ryan Newman (R)	Penske Racing	Ford	28.802	132.241
2	10	Johnny Benson Jr.	MBV Motorsports	Pontiac	29.031	131.198
3	18	Bobby Labonte	Joe Gibbs Racing	Pontiac	29.040	131.157
4	55	Greg Biffle	Andy Petree Racing	Chevrolet	29.048	131.121
5	4	Mike Skinner	Morgan–McClure Motorsports	Chevrolet	29.052	131.103
6	97	Kurt Busch	Roush Racing	Ford	29.075	130.999
7	6	Mark Martin	Roush Racing	Ford	29.117	130.810
8	32	Ricky Craven	PPI Motorsports	Ford	29.120	130.797
9	19	Jeremy Mayfield	Evernham Motorsports	Dodge	29.166	130.590
10	20	Tony Stewart	Joe Gibbs Racing	Pontiac	29.190	130.483
11	43	John Andretti	Petty Enterprises	Dodge	29.200	130.438
12	44	Jerry Nadeau	Petty Enterprises	Dodge	29.211	130.389
13	45	Kyle Petty	Petty Enterprises	Dodge	29.247	130.229
14	15	Michael Waltrip	Dale Earnhardt, Inc.	Chevrolet	29.254	130.198
15	2	Rusty Wallace	Penske Racing	Ford	29.262	130.162
16	36	Ken Schrader	MB2 Motorsports	Pontiac	29.265	130.149
17	17	Matt Kenseth	Roush Racing	Ford	29.271	130.122
18	28	Ricky Rudd	Robert Yates Racing	Ford	29.272	130.117
19	48	Jimmie Johnson (R)	Hendrick Motorsports	Chevrolet	29.299	129.998
20	9	Bill Elliott	Evernham Motorsports	Dodge	29.330	129.860
21	24	Jeff Gordon	Hendrick Motorsports	Chevrolet	29.341	129.811
22	99	Jeff Burton	Roush Racing	Ford	29.345	129.794
23	88	Dale Jarrett	Robert Yates Racing	Ford	29.348	129.781
24	40	Sterling Marlin	Chip Ganassi Racing	Dodge	29.352	129.763
25	77	Dave Blaney	Jasper Motorsports	Ford	29.364	129.710
26	37	Kevin Lepage	Quest Motor Racing	Ford	29.370	129.683
27	22	Ward Burton	Bill Davis Racing	Dodge	29.419	129.467
28	41	Jimmy Spencer	Chip Ganassi Racing	Dodge	29.436	129.393
29	31	Robby Gordon	Richard Childress Racing	Chevrolet	29.461	129.283
30	23	Kenny Wallace	Bill Davis Racing	Dodge	29.482	129.191
31	5	Terry Labonte	Hendrick Motorsports	Chevrolet	29.528	128.989
32	29	Kevin Harvick	Richard Childress Racing	Chevrolet	29.532	128.972
33	30	Jeff Green	Richard Childress Racing	Chevrolet	29.536	128.954
34	25	Joe Nemechek	Hendrick Motorsports	Chevrolet	29.541	128.933
35	26	Todd Bodine	Haas-Carter Motorsports	Ford	29.547	128.906
36	7	Casey Atwood	Ultra-Evernham Motorsports	Dodge	29.555	128.872
Provisionals
37	8	Dale Earnhardt Jr.	Dale Earnhardt, Inc.	Chevrolet	29.669	128.376
38	21	Elliott Sadler	Wood Brothers Racing	Ford	29.571	128.802
39	1	Steve Park	Dale Earnhardt, Inc.	Chevrolet	—	—
40	14	Mike Wallace	A. J. Foyt Enterprises	Pontiac	29.705	128.221
41	11	Brett Bodine	Brett Bodine Racing	Ford	29.694	128.268
42	02	Hermie Sadler	SCORE Motorsports	Chevrolet	30.174	126.228
43	89	Morgan Shepherd	Shepherd Racing Ventures	Ford	29.909	127.346
Failed to qualify
44	51	Carl Long (R)	Ware Racing Enterprises	Dodge	29.847	127.611
Official qualifying results

== Race results ==
Fin	#	Driver	Team	Make	Laps	Led	Status	Pts	Winnings
1	12	Ryan Newman (R)	Penske Racing	Ford	207	143	running	185	$202,550
2	97	Kurt Busch	Roush Racing	Ford	207	7	running	175	$144,300
3	20	Tony Stewart	Joe Gibbs Racing	Pontiac	207	0	running	165	$138,328
4	10	Johnny Benson Jr.	MBV Motorsports	Pontiac	207	53	running	165	$113,625
5	18	Bobby Labonte	Joe Gibbs Racing	Pontiac	207	0	running	155	$113,578
6	32	Ricky Craven	PPI Motorsports	Ford	207	0	running	150	$70,150
7	88	Dale Jarrett	Robert Yates Racing	Ford	207	0	running	146	$94,625
8	15	Michael Waltrip	Dale Earnhardt, Inc.	Chevrolet	207	2	running	147	$66,025
9	48	Jimmie Johnson (R)	Hendrick Motorsports	Chevrolet	207	0	running	138	$56,225
10	17	Matt Kenseth	Roush Racing	Ford	207	0	running	134	$73,875
11	8	Dale Earnhardt Jr.	Dale Earnhardt, Inc.	Chevrolet	207	0	running	130	$70,425
12	28	Ricky Rudd	Robert Yates Racing	Ford	207	0	running	127	$94,442
13	36	Ken Schrader	MB2 Motorsports	Pontiac	207	0	running	124	$74,525
14	24	Jeff Gordon	Hendrick Motorsports	Chevrolet	207	0	running	121	$101,803
15	41	Jimmy Spencer	Chip Ganassi Racing	Dodge	207	0	running	118	$66,250
16	6	Mark Martin	Roush Racing	Ford	207	0	running	115	$85,433
17	31	Robby Gordon	Richard Childress Racing	Chevrolet	207	1	running	117	$76,731
18	23	Kenny Wallace	Bill Davis Racing	Dodge	207	0	running	109	$49,975
19	2	Rusty Wallace	Penske Racing	Ford	207	0	running	106	$90,425
20	99	Jeff Burton	Roush Racing	Ford	207	0	running	103	$94,092
21	40	Sterling Marlin	Chip Ganassi Racing	Dodge	207	0	running	100	$88,067
22	43	John Andretti	Petty Enterprises	Dodge	207	0	running	97	$76,108
23	9	Bill Elliott	Evernham Motorsports	Dodge	206	1	running	99	$74,781
24	19	Jeremy Mayfield	Evernham Motorsports	Dodge	206	0	running	91	$56,425
25	77	Dave Blaney	Jasper Motorsports	Ford	206	0	running	88	$64,514
26	30	Jeff Green	Richard Childress Racing	Chevrolet	206	0	running	85	$48,225
27	55	Greg Biffle	Andy Petree Racing	Chevrolet	206	0	running	82	$56,000
28	44	Jerry Nadeau	Petty Enterprises	Dodge	206	0	running	79	$47,325
29	1	Steve Park	Dale Earnhardt, Inc.	Chevrolet	206	0	running	76	$76,425
30	5	Terry Labonte	Hendrick Motorsports	Chevrolet	206	0	running	73	$73,158
31	14	Mike Wallace	A. J. Foyt Enterprises	Pontiac	206	0	running	70	$43,625
32	25	Joe Nemechek	Hendrick Motorsports	Chevrolet	205	0	running	67	$51,425
33	29	Kevin Harvick	Richard Childress Racing	Chevrolet	205	0	running	64	$89,003
34	7	Casey Atwood	Ultra-Evernham Motorsports	Dodge	205	0	running	61	$43,000
35	21	Elliott Sadler	Wood Brothers Racing	Ford	205	0	running	58	$50,800
36	11	Brett Bodine	Brett Bodine Racing	Ford	204	0	running	55	$42,600
37	02	Hermie Sadler	SCORE Motorsports	Chevrolet	204	0	running	52	$42,450
38	22	Ward Burton	Bill Davis Racing	Dodge	191	0	running	49	$85,300
39	45	Kyle Petty	Petty Enterprises	Dodge	139	0	running	46	$42,225
40	37	Kevin Lepage	Quest Motor Racing	Ford	84	0	engine	43	$42,145
41	89	Morgan Shepherd	Shepherd Racing Ventures	Ford	53	0	brakes	40	$42,050
42	26	Todd Bodine	Haas-Carter Motorsports	Ford	52	0	engine	37	$67,187
43	4	Mike Skinner	Morgan–McClure Motorsports	Chevrolet	40	0	engine	34	$42,164
Official race results

Previous race: 2002 Chevrolet Monte Carlo 400	NASCAR Winston Cup Series; 2002 season	Next race: 2002 MBNA All-American Heroes 400
