= 2002 Protection One 400 =

29th race of the 2002 NASCAR Winston Cup Series

Race details
- Race 29 of 36 in the 2002 NASCAR Winston Cup Series
- The 2002 Protection One 400 program cover.
- Date: September 29, 2002
- Official name: Second Annual Protection One 400
- Location: Kansas Speedway, Kansas City, Kansas
- Course: Permanent racing facility
- Course length: 1.5 miles (2.41 km)
- Distance: 267 laps, 400.5 mi (644.542 km)
- Scheduled distance: 267 laps, 400.5 mi (644.542 km)
- Average speed: 119.394 miles per hour (192.146 km/h)
- Attendance: 78,000

Pole position
Driver	Dale Earnhardt Jr.	Dale Earnhardt, Inc.
- Time: 30.350

Most laps led
Driver	Jeff Gordon	Hendrick Motorsports
- Laps: 116

Winner
No. 24	Jeff Gordon	Hendrick Motorsports

Television in the United States
- Network: NBC
- Announcers: Allen Bestwick, Benny Parsons, Wally Dallenbach Jr.

Radio in the United States
- Radio: Motor Racing Network

The 2002 Protection One 400 was the 29th stock car race of the 2002 NASCAR Winston Cup Series and the second iteration of the event. The race was held on Sunday, September 29, 2002, before a crowd of 78,000 in Kansas City, Kansas, at Kansas Speedway, a 1.5 miles (2.4 km) permanent D-shaped oval racetrack. The race took the scheduled 267 laps to complete. At race's end, Jeff Gordon, driving for Hendrick Motorsports, would pull away on the final restart with three laps to go to win his 61st career NASCAR Winston Cup Series win and his third and final win of the season. To fill out the podium, Ryan Newman and Rusty Wallace, both driving for Penske Racing, would finish second and third, respectively.

Sterling Marlin suffered a neck injury from a crash during the race, which resulted in him missing the rest of the season.

== Background ==
The layout of Kansas Speedway, the venue where the race was held.

Kansas Speedway is a 1.5-mile (2.4 km) tri-oval race track in Kansas City, Kansas. It was built in 2001 and hosts two annual NASCAR race weekends. The NTT IndyCar Series also raced there until 2011. The speedway is owned and operated by the International Speedway Corporation.

=== Entry list ===
- (R) denotes rookie driver.

#	Driver	Team	Make
1	Steve Park	Dale Earnhardt, Inc.	Chevrolet
2	Rusty Wallace	Penske Racing	Ford
4	Mike Skinner	Morgan–McClure Motorsports	Chevrolet
5	Terry Labonte	Hendrick Motorsports	Chevrolet
6	Mark Martin	Roush Racing	Ford
7	Casey Atwood	Ultra-Evernham Motorsports	Dodge
8	Dale Earnhardt Jr.	Dale Earnhardt, Inc.	Chevrolet
9	Bill Elliott	Evernham Motorsports	Dodge
10	Johnny Benson Jr.	MBV Motorsports	Pontiac
11	Brett Bodine	Brett Bodine Racing	Ford
12	Ryan Newman (R)	Penske Racing	Ford
14	Mike Wallace	A. J. Foyt Enterprises	Pontiac
15	Michael Waltrip	Dale Earnhardt, Inc.	Chevrolet
17	Matt Kenseth	Roush Racing	Ford
18	Bobby Labonte	Joe Gibbs Racing	Pontiac
19	Jeremy Mayfield	Evernham Motorsports	Dodge
20	Tony Stewart	Joe Gibbs Racing	Pontiac
21	Elliott Sadler	Wood Brothers Racing	Ford
22	Ward Burton	Bill Davis Racing	Dodge
23	Hut Stricklin	Bill Davis Racing	Dodge
24	Jeff Gordon	Hendrick Motorsports	Chevrolet
25	Joe Nemechek	Hendrick Motorsports	Chevrolet
26	Todd Bodine	Haas-Carter Motorsports	Ford
27	Kirk Shelmerdine	Kirk Shelmerdine Racing	Ford
28	Ricky Rudd	Robert Yates Racing	Ford
29	Kevin Harvick	Richard Childress Racing	Chevrolet
30	Jeff Green	Richard Childress Racing	Chevrolet
31	Robby Gordon	Richard Childress Racing	Chevrolet
32	Ricky Craven	PPI Motorsports	Ford
36	Ken Schrader	MB2 Motorsports	Pontiac
40	Sterling Marlin	Chip Ganassi Racing	Dodge
41	Jimmy Spencer	Chip Ganassi Racing	Dodge
43	John Andretti	Petty Enterprises	Dodge
44	Jerry Nadeau	Petty Enterprises	Dodge
45	Kyle Petty	Petty Enterprises	Dodge
48	Jimmie Johnson (R)	Hendrick Motorsports	Chevrolet
49	Stuart Kirby	BAM Racing	Dodge
51	Carl Long	Ware Racing Enterprises	Dodge
55	Greg Biffle	Andy Petree Racing	Chevrolet
60	Jack Sprague	Haas CNC Racing	Chevrolet
74	Tony Raines	BACE Motorsports	Chevrolet
77	Dave Blaney	Jasper Motorsports	Ford
88	Dale Jarrett	Robert Yates Racing	Ford
89	Morgan Shepherd	Shepherd Racing Ventures	Ford
97	Kurt Busch	Roush Racing	Ford
99	Jeff Burton	Roush Racing	Ford
Official entry list

== Practice ==
=== First practice ===
The first practice session was held on Friday, September 27, at 11:20 AM CST, and would last for 2 hours. Jimmie Johnson of Hendrick Motorsports would set the fastest time in the session, with a lap of 30.430 and an average speed of 177.456 mph (285.588 km/h).

Pos.	#	Driver	Team	Make	Time	Speed
1	48	Jimmie Johnson (R)	Hendrick Motorsports	Chevrolet	30.430	177.456
2	12	Ryan Newman (R)	Penske Racing	Ford	30.466	177.247
3	25	Joe Nemechek	Hendrick Motorsports	Chevrolet	30.473	177.206
Full first practice results

=== Second practice ===
The second practice session was held on Saturday, September 28, at 9:30 AM CST, and would last for 45 minutes. Ryan Newman of Penske Racing would set the fastest time in the session, with a lap of 30.898 and an average speed of 174.769 mph (281.263 km/h).

Pos.	#	Driver	Team	Make	Time	Speed
1	12	Ryan Newman (R)	Penske Racing	Ford	30.898	174.769
2	97	Kurt Busch	Roush Racing	Ford	31.108	173.589
3	24	Jeff Gordon	Hendrick Motorsports	Chevrolet	31.128	173.477
Full second practice results

=== Final practice ===
The final practice session was held on Saturday, September 28, at 11:15 AM CST, and would last for 45 minutes. Steve Park of Dale Earnhardt, Inc. would set the fastest time in the session, with a lap of 31.554 and an average speed of 171.135 mph (275.415 km/h).

During the opening minutes of the session, Joe Gibbs Racing driver Bobby Labonte would crash in turn two, forcing the team to go to a backup car.

Pos.	#	Driver	Team	Make	Time	Speed
1	1	Steve Park	Dale Earnhardt, Inc.	Chevrolet	31.554	171.135
2	48	Jimmie Johnson (R)	Hendrick Motorsports	Chevrolet	31.585	170.967
3	24	Jeff Gordon	Hendrick Motorsports	Chevrolet	31.609	170.837
Full Final practice results

== Qualifying ==
Qualifying was held on Friday, September 27, at 3:05 PM CST. Each driver would have two laps to set a fastest time; the fastest of the two would count as their official qualifying lap. Positions 1-36 would be decided on time, while positions 37-43 would be based on provisionals. Six spots are awarded by the use of provisionals based on owner's points. The seventh is awarded to a past champion who has not otherwise qualified for the race. If no past champion needs the provisional, the next team in the owner points will be awarded a provisional.

Dale Earnhardt Jr. of Dale Earnhardt, Inc. would win the pole, setting a time of 30.350 and an average speed of 177.924 miles per hour (286.341 km/h).

Three drivers would fail to qualify: Brett Bodine, Kirk Shelmerdine, and Carl Long.

=== Full qualifying results ===
Pos.	#	Driver	Team	Make	Time	Speed
1	8	Dale Earnhardt Jr.	Dale Earnhardt, Inc.	Chevrolet	30.350	177.924
2	48	Jimmie Johnson (R)	Hendrick Motorsports	Chevrolet	30.362	177.854
3	12	Ryan Newman (R)	Penske Racing	Ford	30.526	176.898
4	15	Michael Waltrip	Dale Earnhardt, Inc.	Chevrolet	30.598	176.482
5	9	Bill Elliott	Evernham Motorsports	Dodge	30.640	176.240
6	88	Dale Jarrett	Robert Yates Racing	Ford	30.645	176.212
7	40	Sterling Marlin	Chip Ganassi Racing	Dodge	30.671	176.062
8	20	Tony Stewart	Joe Gibbs Racing	Pontiac	30.682	175.999
9	6	Mark Martin	Roush Racing	Ford	30.703	175.879
10	24	Jeff Gordon	Hendrick Motorsports	Chevrolet	30.703	175.879
11	2	Rusty Wallace	Penske Racing	Ford	30.707	175.856
12	25	Joe Nemechek	Hendrick Motorsports	Chevrolet	30.710	175.839
13	97	Kurt Busch	Roush Racing	Ford	30.712	175.827
14	19	Jeremy Mayfield	Evernham Motorsports	Dodge	30.755	175.581
15	99	Jeff Burton	Roush Racing	Ford	30.792	175.370
16	26	Todd Bodine	Haas-Carter Motorsports	Ford	30.796	175.347
17	1	Steve Park	Dale Earnhardt, Inc.	Chevrolet	30.797	175.342
18	5	Terry Labonte	Hendrick Motorsports	Chevrolet	30.803	175.308
19	22	Ward Burton	Bill Davis Racing	Dodge	30.830	175.154
20	32	Ricky Craven	PPI Motorsports	Ford	30.833	175.137
21	43	John Andretti	Petty Enterprises	Dodge	30.849	175.046
22	31	Robby Gordon	Richard Childress Racing	Chevrolet	30.853	175.023
23	60	Jack Sprague	Haas CNC Racing	Chevrolet	30.867	174.944
24	30	Jeff Green	Richard Childress Racing	Chevrolet	30.881	174.865
25	74	Tony Raines	BACE Motorsports	Chevrolet	30.904	174.735
26	29	Kevin Harvick	Richard Childress Racing	Chevrolet	30.954	174.452
27	17	Matt Kenseth	Roush Racing	Ford	30.974	174.340
28	23	Kenny Wallace	Bill Davis Racing	Dodge	30.999	174.199
29	55	Greg Biffle	Andy Petree Racing	Chevrolet	31.012	174.126
30	28	Ricky Rudd	Robert Yates Racing	Ford	31.018	174.092
31	18	Bobby Labonte	Joe Gibbs Racing	Pontiac	31.021	174.076
32	4	Mike Skinner	Morgan–McClure Motorsports	Chevrolet	31.022	174.070
33	45	Kyle Petty	Petty Enterprises	Dodge	31.032	174.014
34	77	Dave Blaney	Jasper Motorsports	Ford	31.058	173.868
35	10	Johnny Benson Jr.	MBV Motorsports	Pontiac	31.195	173.105
36	14	Mike Wallace	A. J. Foyt Enterprises	Pontiac	31.199	173.083
Provisionals
37	41	Jimmy Spencer	Chip Ganassi Racing	Dodge	31.513	171.358
38	21	Elliott Sadler	Wood Brothers Racing	Ford	31.286	172.601
39	36	Ken Schrader	MB2 Motorsports	Pontiac	31.292	172.568
40	7	Casey Atwood	Ultra-Evernham Motorsports	Dodge	31.251	172.794
41	44	Jerry Nadeau	Petty Enterprises	Dodge	31.307	172.485
42	49	Stuart Kirby	BAM Racing	Dodge	31.716	170.261
43	89	Morgan Shepherd	Shepherd Racing Ventures	Ford	32.028	168.602
Failed to qualify
44	11	Brett Bodine	Brett Bodine Racing	Ford	31.398	171.986
45	27	Kirk Shelmerdine	Kirk Shelmerdine Racing	Ford	31.635	170.697
46	51	Carl Long (R)	Ware Racing Enterprises	Dodge	31.640	170.670
Official qualifying results

== Race results ==
Fin	#	Driver	Team	Make	Laps	Led	Status	Pts	Winnings
1	24	Jeff Gordon	Hendrick Motorsports	Chevrolet	267	116	running	185	$217,928
2	12	Ryan Newman (R)	Penske Racing	Ford	267	81	running	175	$150,140
3	2	Rusty Wallace	Penske Racing	Ford	267	0	running	165	$140,800
4	25	Joe Nemechek	Hendrick Motorsports	Chevrolet	267	0	running	160	$105,025
5	9	Bill Elliott	Evernham Motorsports	Dodge	267	3	running	160	$106,231
6	8	Dale Earnhardt Jr.	Dale Earnhardt, Inc.	Chevrolet	267	10	running	155	$96,700
7	17	Matt Kenseth	Roush Racing	Ford	267	0	running	146	$89,400
8	20	Tony Stewart	Joe Gibbs Racing	Pontiac	267	0	running	142	$111,778
9	19	Jeremy Mayfield	Evernham Motorsports	Dodge	267	0	running	138	$74,400
10	48	Jimmie Johnson (R)	Hendrick Motorsports	Chevrolet	266	0	running	134	$69,650
11	29	Kevin Harvick	Richard Childress Racing	Chevrolet	266	48	running	135	$107,478
12	5	Terry Labonte	Hendrick Motorsports	Chevrolet	266	0	running	127	$92,333
13	31	Robby Gordon	Richard Childress Racing	Chevrolet	266	0	running	124	$88,156
14	43	John Andretti	Petty Enterprises	Dodge	266	0	running	121	$90,283
15	45	Kyle Petty	Petty Enterprises	Dodge	266	2	running	123	$64,250
16	23	Kenny Wallace	Bill Davis Racing	Dodge	266	0	running	115	$61,100
17	30	Jeff Green	Richard Childress Racing	Chevrolet	266	0	running	112	$61,800
18	21	Elliott Sadler	Wood Brothers Racing	Ford	265	1	running	114	$83,500
19	14	Mike Wallace	A. J. Foyt Enterprises	Pontiac	264	0	running	106	$60,200
20	28	Ricky Rudd	Robert Yates Racing	Ford	263	0	running	103	$104,117
21	77	Dave Blaney	Jasper Motorsports	Ford	261	0	running	100	$81,050
22	18	Bobby Labonte	Joe Gibbs Racing	Pontiac	261	0	running	97	$101,978
23	10	Johnny Benson Jr.	MBV Motorsports	Pontiac	260	2	crash	99	$85,950
24	41	Jimmy Spencer	Chip Ganassi Racing	Dodge	259	0	crash	91	$69,400
25	6	Mark Martin	Roush Racing	Ford	250	1	engine	93	$92,833
26	15	Michael Waltrip	Dale Earnhardt, Inc.	Chevrolet	239	0	running	85	$66,400
27	44	Jerry Nadeau	Petty Enterprises	Dodge	231	0	ignition	82	$66,089
28	36	Ken Schrader	MB2 Motorsports	Pontiac	230	0	running	79	$63,000
29	99	Jeff Burton	Roush Racing	Ford	222	3	engine	81	$99,467
30	1	Steve Park	Dale Earnhardt, Inc.	Chevrolet	216	0	running	73	$84,975
31	97	Kurt Busch	Roush Racing	Ford	206	0	running	70	$62,400
32	4	Mike Skinner	Morgan–McClure Motorsports	Chevrolet	198	0	running	67	$54,200
33	40	Sterling Marlin	Chip Ganassi Racing	Dodge	147	0	crash	64	$96,317
34	26	Todd Bodine	Haas-Carter Motorsports	Ford	129	0	engine	61	$78,987
35	60	Jack Sprague	Haas CNC Racing	Chevrolet	97	0	crash	58	$53,550
36	55	Greg Biffle	Andy Petree Racing	Chevrolet	74	0	crash	55	$61,300
37	49	Stuart Kirby	BAM Racing	Dodge	44	0	engine	52	$53,100
38	32	Ricky Craven	PPI Motorsports	Ford	40	0	overheating	49	$60,900
39	88	Dale Jarrett	Robert Yates Racing	Ford	39	0	engine	46	$72,700
40	89	Morgan Shepherd	Shepherd Racing Ventures	Ford	30	0	crash	43	$52,500
41	74	Tony Raines	BACE Motorsports	Chevrolet	5	0	crash	40	$52,300
42	7	Casey Atwood	Ultra-Evernham Motorsports	Dodge	5	0	crash	37	$52,100
43	22	Ward Burton	Bill Davis Racing	Dodge	5	0	crash	34	$95,153
Official race results

Previous race: 2002 MBNA All-American Heroes 400	NASCAR Winston Cup Series; 2002 season	Next race: 2002 EA Sports 500
