= 2002 Mountain Dew Southern 500 =

Race details
- Race 25 of 36 in the 2002 NASCAR Winston Cup Series
- 2002 Southern 500 program cover
- Date: September 1, 2002
- Official name: Mountain Dew Southern 500
- Location: Darlington Raceway, Darlington County, South Carolina
- Course: Permanent racing facility
- Course length: 1.366 miles (2.198 km)
- Distance: 367 laps, 501.322 mi (806.800 km)
- Weather: Temperatures hovering around 80.6 °F (27.0 °C); wind speeds gusting up to 11.3 miles per hour (18.2 km/h)
- Average speed: 118.617 miles per hour (190.896 km/h)

Pole position
Driver	Sterling Marlin	Chip Ganassi Racing

Most laps led
Driver	Jeff Gordon	Hendrick Motorsports
- Laps: 125

Winner
No. 24	Jeff Gordon	Hendrick Motorsports

Television in the United States
- Network: Turner Network Television
- Announcers: Allen Bestwick, Benny Parsons and Wally Dallenbach Jr.

The 2002 Mountain Dew Southern 500, the 53rd running of the event, was a NASCAR Winston Cup Series race held on September 1, 2002 at Darlington Raceway in Darlington, South Carolina. Contested over 367 laps on the 1.366-mile (2.198-kilometre) speedway, it was the twenty-fifth race of the 2002 NASCAR Winston Cup Series season. Jeff Gordon of Hendrick Motorsports won the race.

== Background ==
Darlington Raceway, nicknamed by many NASCAR fans and drivers as "The Lady in Black" or "The Track Too Tough to Tame" and advertised as a "NASCAR Tradition", is a race track built for NASCAR racing located near Darlington, South Carolina. It is of a unique, somewhat egg-shaped design, an oval with the ends of very different configurations, a condition which supposedly arose from the proximity of one end of the track to a minnow pond the owner refused to relocate. This situation makes it very challenging for the crews to set up their cars' handling in a way that will be effective at both ends.

The track, Darlington Raceway, is a four-turn, 1.366-mile (2.198-kilometre) oval. The track's first two turns are banked at twenty-five degrees, while the final two turns are banked two degrees lower at twenty-three degrees.

== Top 10 results ==
Pos	No.	Driver	Team	Manufacturer
1	24	Jeff Gordon	Hendrick Motorsports	Chevrolet
2	12	Ryan Newman	Penske Racing	Ford
3	9	Bill Elliott	Evernham Motorsports	Dodge
4	40	Sterling Marlin	Chip Ganassi Racing	Dodge
5	88	Dale Jarrett	Robert Yates Racing	Ford
6	22	Ward Burton	Bill Davis Racing	Dodge
7	97	Kurt Busch	Roush Racing	Ford
8	20	Tony Stewart	Joe Gibbs Racing	Pontiac
9	48	Jimmie Johnson	Hendrick Motorsports	Chevrolet
10	99	Jeff Burton	Roush Racing	Ford

=== Race statistics ===
- Time of race: 4:13:35
- Average speed: 118.617 miles per hour (190.896 km/h)
- Pole speed: no time trials
- Cautions: 9 for 63 laps
- Margin of victory: 1.734 seconds
- Lead changes: 14
- Percent of race run under caution: 17.2%
- Average green flag run: 33.8 laps

Previous race: 2002 Sharpie 500	NASCAR Winston Cup Series; 2002 season	Next race: 2002 Chevrolet Monte Carlo 400
