= 2002 MBNA All-American Heroes 400 =

Race details
- Race 28 of 36 in the 2002 NASCAR Winston Cup Series season
- Date: September 22, 2002
- Official name: MBNA All-American Heroes 400
- Location: Dover International Speedway, Dover, Delaware
- Course: Permanent racing facility
- Course length: 1.000 miles (1.609 km)
- Distance: 400 laps, 400 mi (643.737 km)
- Average speed: 120.805 miles per hour (194.417 km/h)

Pole position
| Driver | Rusty Wallace | Penske Racing |

Most laps led
| Driver | Jimmie Johnson | Hendrick Motorsports |
- Laps: 170

Winner
| No. 48 | Jimmie Johnson | Hendrick Motorsports |

Television in the United States
- Network: TNT
- Announcers: Allen Bestwick; Benny Parsons; Wally Dallenbach Jr.

The 2002 MBNA All-American Heroes 400 was a NASCAR Winston Cup Series race held on September 22, 2002, at Dover International Speedway, in Dover, Delaware. Contested over 400 laps on the 1-mile (1.6 km) concrete speedway, it was the 28th race of the 2002 NASCAR Winston Cup Series season.

Jimmie Johnson of Hendrick Motorsports won the race.

== Background ==
Dover International Speedway (formerly Dover Downs International Speedway) is a race track in Dover, Delaware, United States. Since opening in 1969, it has held at least two NASCAR races per year. In addition to NASCAR, the track also hosted USAC and the IndyCar Series. The track features one layout, a 1 mile (1.6 km) concrete oval, with 24° banking in the turns and 9° banking on the straights. The speedway is owned and operated by Dover Motorsports.

The track, nicknamed "The Monster Mile", was built in 1969 by Melvin Joseph of Melvin L. Joseph Construction Company, Inc., with an asphalt surface, but was replaced with concrete in 1995. Six years later in 2001, the track's capacity moved to 135,000 seats, making the track have the largest capacity of sports venue in the mid-Atlantic. In 2002, the name changed to Dover International Speedway from Dover Downs International Speedway after Dover Downs Gaming and Entertainment split, making Dover Motorsports. From 2007 to 2009, the speedway worked on an improvement project called "The Monster Makeover", which expanded facilities at the track and beautified the track. After the 2014 season, the track's capacity was reduced to 95,500 seats.

== Top 10 results ==
| Pos | No. | Driver | Team | Manufacturer |
|---|---|---|---|---|
| 1 | 48 | Jimmie Johnson | Hendrick Motorsports | Chevrolet |
| 2 | 6 | Mark Martin | Roush Racing | Ford |
| 3 | 88 | Dale Jarrett | Robert Yates Racing | Ford |
| 4 | 17 | Matt Kenseth | Roush Racing | Ford |
| 5 | 20 | Tony Stewart | Joe Gibbs Racing | Pontiac |
| 6 | 99 | Jeff Burton | Roush Racing | Ford |
| 7 | 97 | Kurt Busch | Roush Racing | Ford |
| 8 | 12 | Ryan Newman | Penske Racing | Ford |
| 9 | 32 | Ricky Craven | PPI Motorsports | Ford |
| 10 | 10 | Johnny Benson Jr. | MB2 Motorsports | Pontiac |

=== Race statistics ===
- Time of race: 3:18:40
- Average Speed: 120.805 miles per hour (194.417 km/h)
- Pole Speed: 156.822 miles per hour (252.381 km/h)
- Cautions: 6 for 37 laps
- Margin of Victory: 0.535 sec
- Lead changes: 15
- Percent of race run under caution: 9.2%
- Average green flag run: 51.9 laps

| Previous race: 2002 New Hampshire 300 | NASCAR Winston Cup Series; 2002 season | Next race: 2002 Protection One 400 |
