= 2002 EA Sports 500 =

30th race of 2002 NASCAR Winston Cup Series

Race details
- Race 30 of 36 in the 2002 NASCAR Winston Cup Series
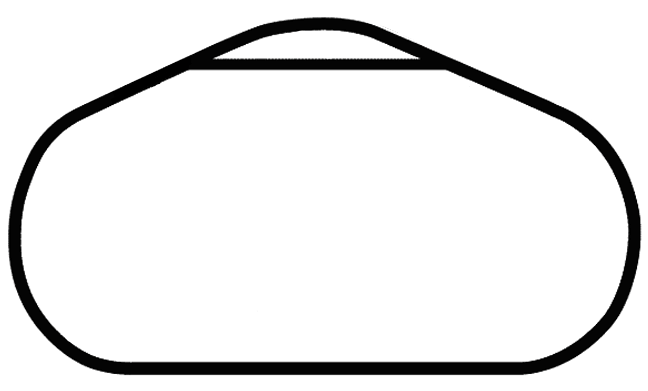
- Layout of Talladega Superspeedway
- Date: October 6, 2002
- Location: Talladega Superspeedway, Lincoln, Alabama
- Course: Permanent racing facility
- Course length: 2.66 miles (4.2829 km)
- Distance: 188 laps, 500.1 mi (804.83 km)
- Weather: Hot with temperatures approaching 89.1 °F (31.7 °C); wind speeds up to 6 miles per hour (9.7 km/h)
- Average speed: 183.665 miles per hour (295.580 km/h)

Pole position
Driver	Jimmie Johnson	Hendrick Motorsports
- Time: No time trials

Most laps led
Driver	Dale Earnhardt Jr.	Dale Earnhardt, Inc.
- Laps: 56

Winner
No. 8	Dale Earnhardt Jr.	Dale Earnhardt, Inc.

Television in the United States
- Network: NBC
- Announcers: Allen Bestwick, Benny Parsons, Wally Dallenbach Jr.

The 2002 EA Sports 500 was a NASCAR Winston Cup Series stock car race held on October 6, 2002, at the Talladega Superspeedway in Lincoln, Alabama.

== Summary ==
The race was the 30th in the 2002 Winston Cup season, and was broadcast by NBC. Jimmie Johnson of Hendrick Motorsports was awarded the pole position after qualifying was canceled, while Dale Earnhardt Jr. of Dale Earnhardt, Inc., who won the previous race, led the most laps and won his second consecutive EA Sports 500. The race was also the first Winston Cup race at Talladega after the track had installed SAFER barriers. Vocal group Little Big Town performed the national anthem, while former National Football League quarterback Ken Stabler was the grand marshal.

To spread out the tightly grouped packs, NASCAR officials reduced the size of the fuel cells from 22 US gallons (83 L) to 13 US gallons (49 L). The race also featured a record $250,000 leader bonus if the winner of the race becomes the Cup points leader, with Johnson, Mark Martin, Tony Stewart, Jeff Gordon and Rusty Wallace being the eligible drivers.

=== Race ===
On the warm-up lap, Mark Martin's steering box locked, causing him to crash into pole-sitter Jimmie Johnson. As a result of the incident, Martin was black-flagged, while Johnson's crew chief Chad Knaus requested NASCAR to inspect the car and repair the damaged right front fender. Johnson made a pit stop on lap one. Jeff Gordon led the first three laps, but on lap 125, he was forced to move the car to the garage after his crew found smoke under the hood, ending his race. Gordon was not the only Hendrick Motorsports to fail to finish; the other Hendrick drivers, Johnson, Terry Labonte and Joe Nemechek, and the MB2 Motorsports cars of Johnny Benson Jr. and Ken Schrader, who were also using Hendrick powered engines, also had their engines fail during the race.

In the end, Dale Earnhardt Jr. won his third consecutive Talladega race after leading the last 39 laps, making him the first driver to win both Talladega races (EA Sports 500 and the Aaron's 499) since his father accomplished the feat in 1999. Though Talladega has been known for featuring crashes known as "The Big One", no cautions occurred during the race. It would be the last incident-free race in NASCAR's premiership until the 2012 Auto Club 400, which raced 125 laps of 200 before the caution took place for rain that ended the race on Lap 129, and the 2019 Pennzoil 400, which only was stopped twice for end-of-segment breaks.

=== Results ===
1. Dale Earnhardt Jr.
2. Tony Stewart
3. Ricky Rudd
4. Kurt Busch
5. Jeff Green
6. Steve Park
7. Ryan Newman
8. Michael Waltrip
9. Dale Jarrett
10. Ward Burton
11. Jeff Burton
12. Robby Gordon
13. Rusty Wallace
14. Matt Kenseth
15. Ricky Craven
16. Kyle Petty
17. Scott Wimmer
18. John Andretti
19. Bill Elliott
20. Jeremy Mayfield
21. Jimmy Spencer
22. Stacy Compton
23. Todd Bodine
24. Jerry Nadeau
25. Bobby Labonte
26. Jamie McMurray
27. Kevin Harvick
28. Mike Skinner
29. Brett Bodine
30. Mark Martin
31. Dave Blaney
32. Ron Hornaday Jr.
33. Kenny Wallace
34. Casey Atwood
35. Mike Wallace
36. Elliott Sadler
37. Jimmie Johnson*
38. Terry Labonte*
39. Joe Nemechek*
40. Johnny Benson Jr.*
41. Ken Schrader*
42. Jeff Gordon*
43. Jay Sauter*

* Driver failed to finish race

== Standings after the race ==
Pos	Driver	Points	Differential
1	Tony Stewart	3958	0
2	Mark Martin	3901	-72
3	Jimmie Johnson	3886	-82
4	Ryan Newman	3821	-137
5	Rusty Wallace	3811	-172
6	Matt Kenseth	3757	-201
6	Jeff Gordon	3757	-201
8	Bill Elliott	3729	-229
9	Ricky Rudd	3712	-246
10	Sterling Marlin	3703	-255

Previous race: 2002 Protection One 400	Winston Cup Series; 2002 season	Next race: 2002 UAW-GM Quality 500
