= Matt Kenseth =

American racing driver (born 1972)

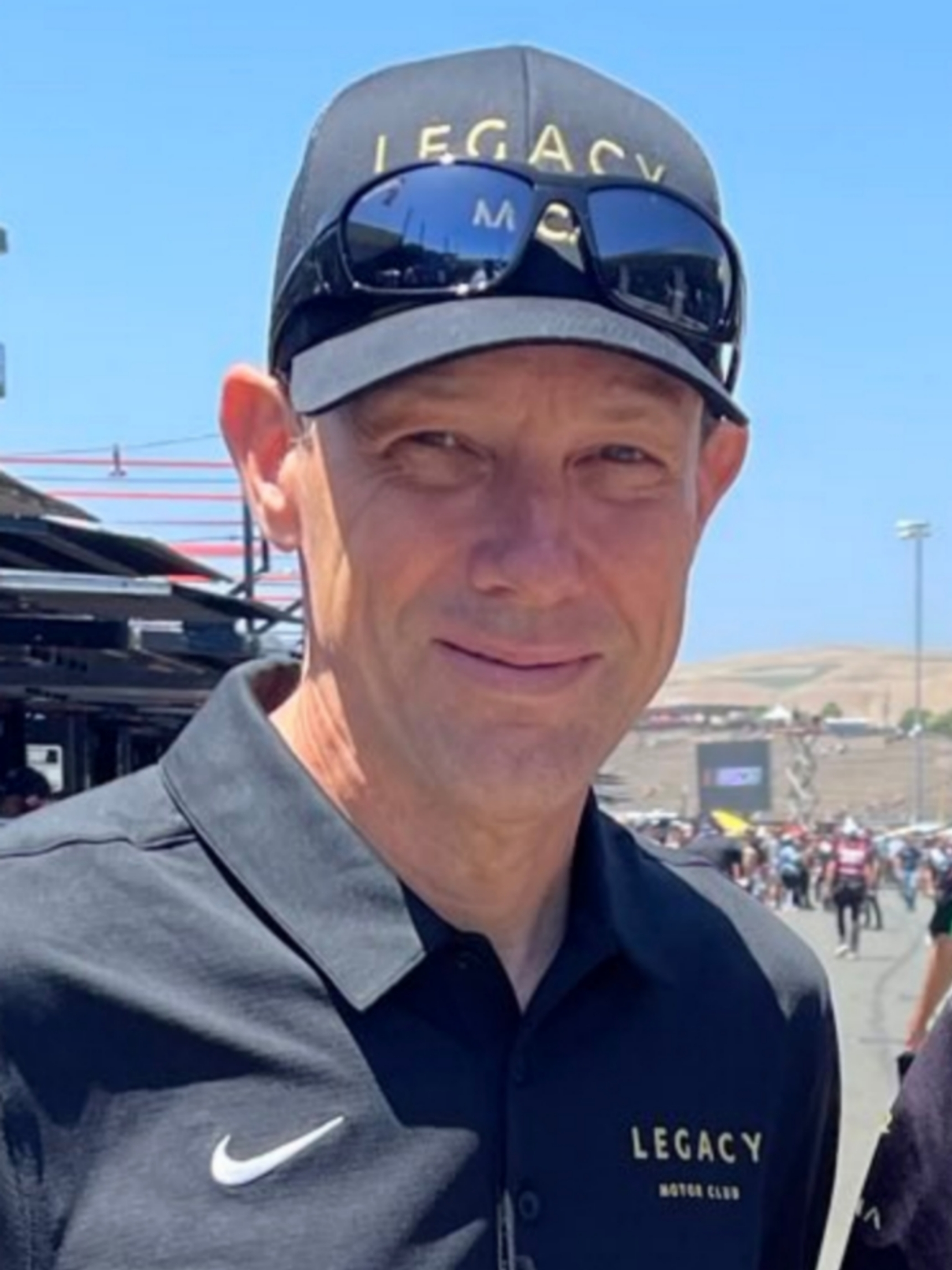
- Kenseth at Sonoma Raceway in 2024
- Born: Matthew Roy Kenseth; March 10, 1972 (age 54); Cambridge, Wisconsin, U.S.
- Height: 5 ft 9 in (1.75 m)
- Weight: 152 lb (69 kg)
- Achievements: 2003 Winston Cup Series Champion; 2004 IROC Champion; 2009, 2012 Daytona 500 Winner; 2000 Coca-Cola 600 Winner; 2013 Bojangles' Southern 500 Winner; 2004 Nextel All-Star Challenge Winner; 2012, 2014 Budweiser Duel Winner; 2015 Sprint Unlimited Winner; 1994, 2002, 2006, 2008, 2009, 2012, 2016, 2019 Slinger Nationals Winner (Most All-Time)
- Awards: 2000 Winston Cup Series Rookie of the Year; NASCAR Hall of Fame (2023); Named one of NASCAR's 75 Greatest Drivers (2023)

NASCAR Cup Series career
- 697 races run over 22 years
- 2020 position: 28th
- Best finish: 1st (2003)
- First race: 1998 MBNA Gold 400 (Dover)
- Last race: 2020 Season Finale 500 (Phoenix)
- First win: 2000 Coca-Cola 600 (Charlotte)
- Last win: 2017 Can-Am 500 (Phoenix)
Wins	Top tens	Poles
39	331	20

NASCAR O'Reilly Auto Parts Series career
- 288 races run over 19 years
- 2015 position: 89th
- Best finish: 2nd (1998)
- First race: 1996 Red Dog 300 (Charlotte)
- Last race: 2015 Kansas Lottery 300 (Kansas)
- First win: 1998 GM Goodwrench Service Plus 200 (Rockingham)
- Last win: 2014 Ford EcoBoost 300 (Homestead)
Wins	Top tens	Poles
29	202	17

NASCAR Canada Series career
- 1 race run over 1 year
- 2002 position: 67th
- Best finish: 67th (2002)
- First race: 2002 Canada Day Shootout (Cayuga)
- First win: 2002 Canada Day Shootout (Cayuga)
Wins	Top tens	Poles
1	1	0
- Statistics up to date as of November 8, 2020.

Matthew Roy Kenseth (born March 10, 1972) is an American former professional stock car racing driver and the current competition advisor for Legacy Motor Club in the NASCAR Cup Series. Most recently, he raced part-time in the Superstar Racing Experience (SRX), driving the No. 8 car. Kenseth is also an active competitor at Slinger Speedway, where he holds the record for the most Slinger Nationals victories.

Kenseth began his racing career on Wisconsin's short tracks, where he claimed track championships at Madison International Speedway, Slinger Super Speedway, and Wisconsin International Raceway. He later advanced to compete in the ARTGO, American Speed Association, and Hooters Late Model touring series. Eventually, he secured a full-time ride in the NASCAR Busch Series (now Xfinity Series) with former Wisconsin short-track rival Robbie Reiser, finishing second and third in the series standings during his tenure.

Kenseth advanced to the NASCAR Winston Cup Series, earning Rookie of the Year honors in 2000 and winning the final Winston Cup championship in 2003. As the reigning champion, he competed in the 2004 International Race of Champions season and claimed the series championship. Kenseth secured a rain-shortened victory at the Daytona 500 in 2009 and captured a second Daytona 500 title in 2012. As of 2022, he remains the last driver to compete in at least one NASCAR Cup Series race across four consecutive decades (1990s, 2000s, 2010s, and 2020s). He is also the father of Ross Kenseth.

== Early life and career ==
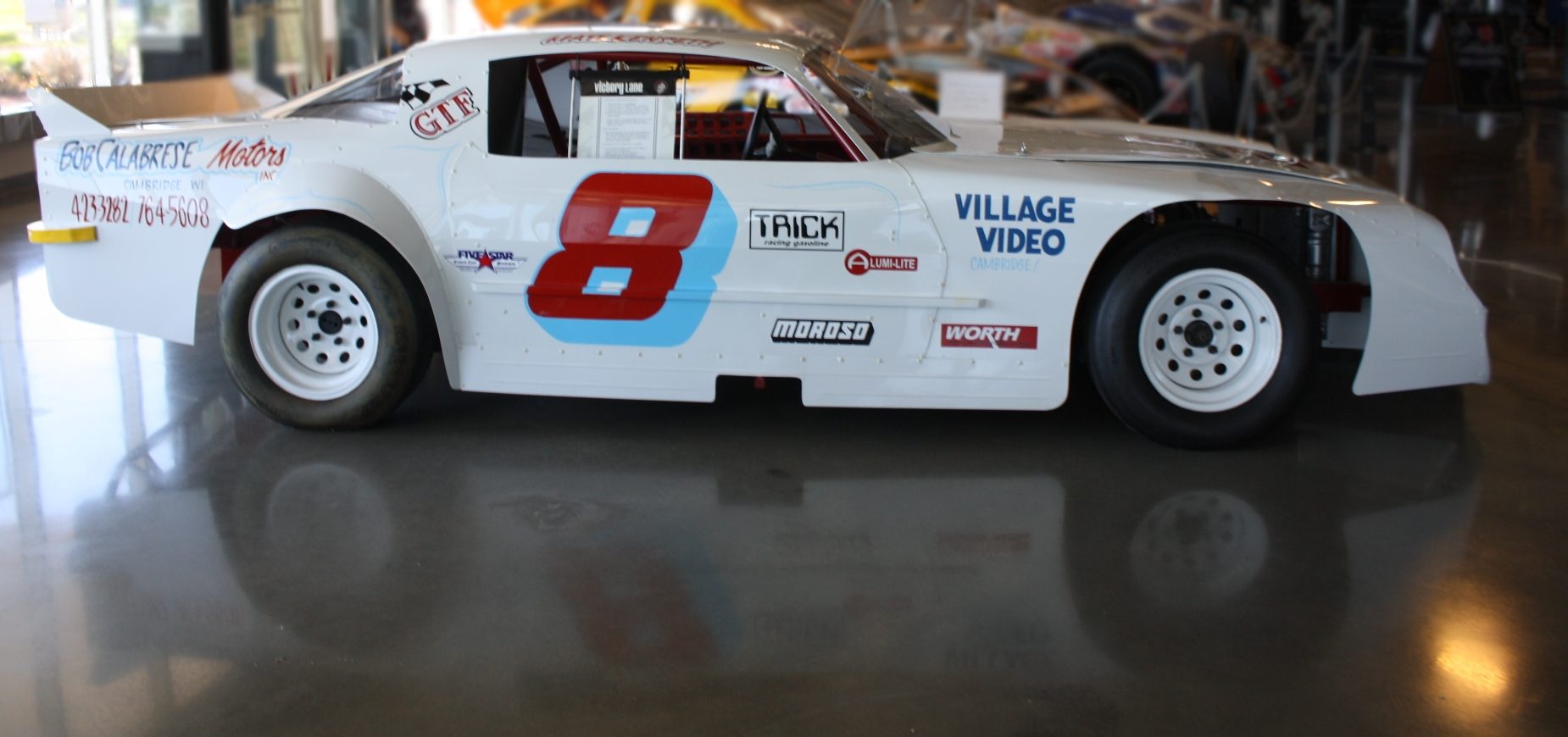
Kenseth's Sportsman car from Columbus 151 Speedway

Kenseth, born in Cambridge, Wisconsin, began stock car racing in 1988 at sixteen years old at Madison International Speedway. Before that, he and his father, Roy, had an agreement: Roy would buy a car and race, while Matt worked on it until he was old enough to drive. "Neither of us knew much, and it was a learning experience," Kenseth recalled. Kenseth's first car, a 1981 Camaro previously driven to championships by Todd Kropf, proved successful. He won a feature race in just his third outing, holding off two top drivers, Pete Moore and Dave Phillips. "Matt was smooth. I knew then he was going to be a racer," Roy said. In 1989, Kenseth competed for the points title at Wisconsin Dells, finishing second with eight feature wins. He also raced at Golden Sands Speedway and Columbus 151 Speedway. In 1990, he bought a late model car from Rich Bickle and won the season opener at Slinger Super Speedway, earning Rookie of the Year honors and finishing sixth in points. That year, he entered 15 ARTGO events and competed in forty features.

After graduating from Cambridge High School, Kenseth worked at Left-hander Chassis, a racecar manufacturer, while continuing to race. In 1991, he became the youngest winner in ARTGO history, taking the checkered flag at La Crosse Fairgrounds Speedway after passing notable drivers like Joe Shear and Steve Holzhausen. The 1992 season was challenging, with Kenseth managing only three wins and numerous engine failures. Frustrated, he considered quitting but decided to continue after Kipley Performance loaned him a motor for the season finale, improving his performance. In 1993, Kenseth built a new car with a Kipley engine and won eight races at Madison, finishing second in points. Later that year, Mike Butz offered him a chance to race his late model. After early struggles, Kenseth and Butz's team found success, winning the final short-track races at Madison, La Crosse, and I-70 Speedway. Kenseth also finished third in points at Wisconsin International Raceway.

The 1994 and 1995 seasons solidified Kenseth as a rising short-track star. Racing across Wisconsin, he earned victories over nationally known drivers like Dick Trickle and Robbie Reiser. In 1994, Kenseth competed in sixty events, winning track championships at Wisconsin International Raceway (WIR) on Thursdays and Madison International Speedway on Fridays, where he claimed twelve of seventeen feature wins. He also captured the prestigious Slinger Nationals title. In 1995, Kenseth repeated as WIR champion, finished second at Madison, and won the Red, White, and Blue state championship series at WIR. Reflecting on his success, team owner Patty Butz remarked, "We knew by 1995 that Matt had too much talent to be with us for very long."

In 1996, Kenseth moved to the Southern United States to race in the Hooters Late Model Series for engine builder Carl Wegner. The plan included running the Hooters Series, five NASCAR Craftsman Truck Series races, and five Busch Series events before transitioning to the Busch Series full-time in 1997. Kenseth finished third in the Hooters Series standings, nearly winning the championship as a rookie. He made his Busch Series debut that year at Lowe's Motor Speedway, starting 30th and finishing 22nd in a car rented from Bobby Dotter. However, the team struggled to secure major sponsorship, which left Kenseth frustrated. "It was just like 1992," he said. "Plans just didn't work. I thought things would be different. Personally, I had moved and was adjusting to being a thousand miles from home." By the end of the season, the Wegner/Kenseth partnership dissolved. Kenseth then joined Gerry Gunderman's American Speed Association team, which had previously housed Alan Kulwicki's shop before his move to NASCAR. They raced together in two events in 1997 before Kenseth received a pivotal phone call from a former competitor.

== NASCAR career ==
=== 1997 ===
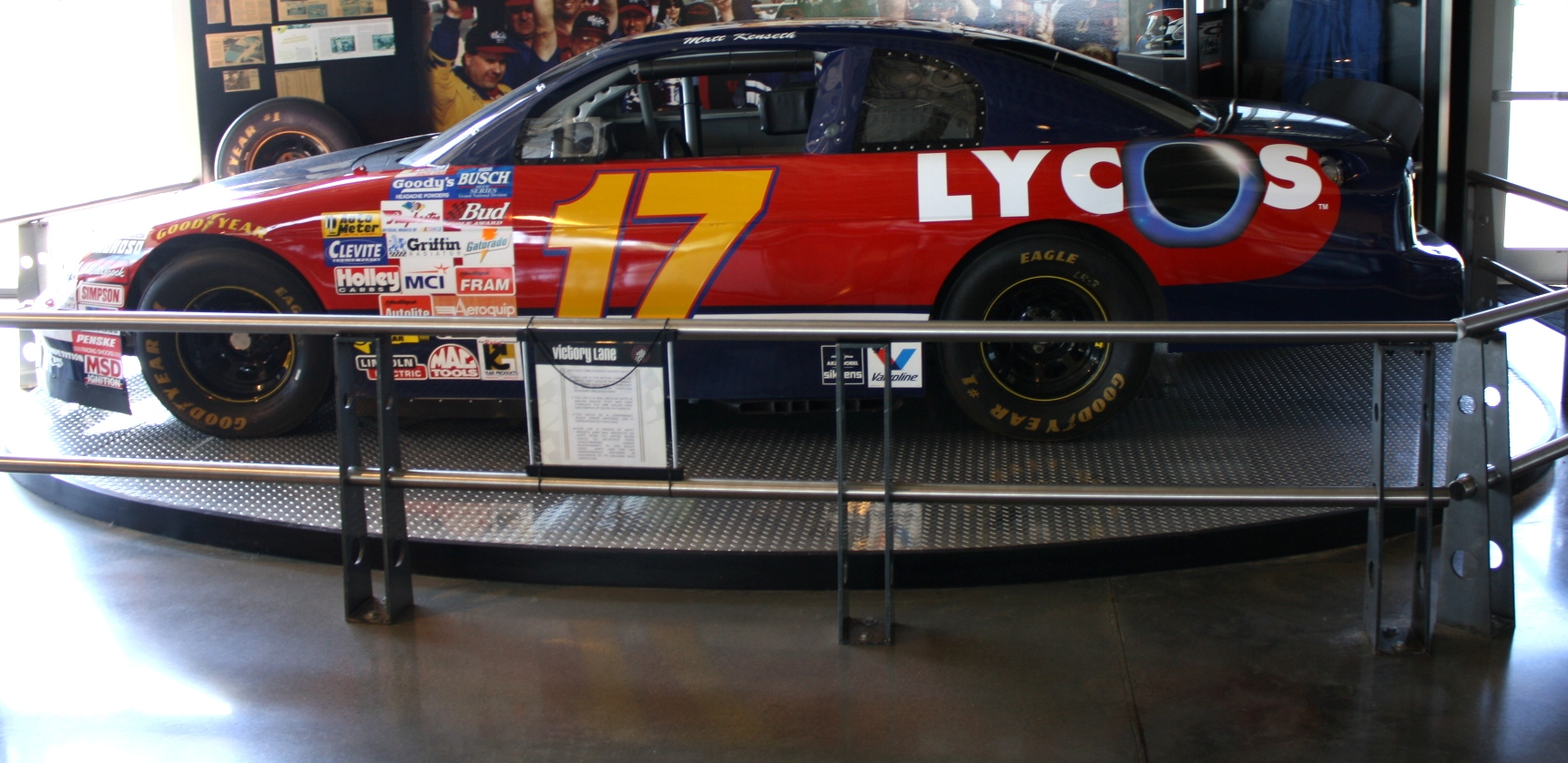
Busch car for Kenseth's first victory

In 1997, driver Tim Bender was injured, prompting crew chief and car owner Robbie Reiser to hire Kenseth, despite Kenseth having only one prior Busch Series start. Reiser explained, "Matt and I used to have some fierce races against each other. I needed someone who understood race cars the way I understood them. I knew he could drive and he could talk to me in a manner I could understand." In their first race together, Kenseth qualified third but spun late while running third, finishing eleventh. At Talladega, his second race on a drafting track, Kenseth started 20th and climbed to finish seventh. He secured two top-five finishes during the partial season.

=== 1998–1999 ===
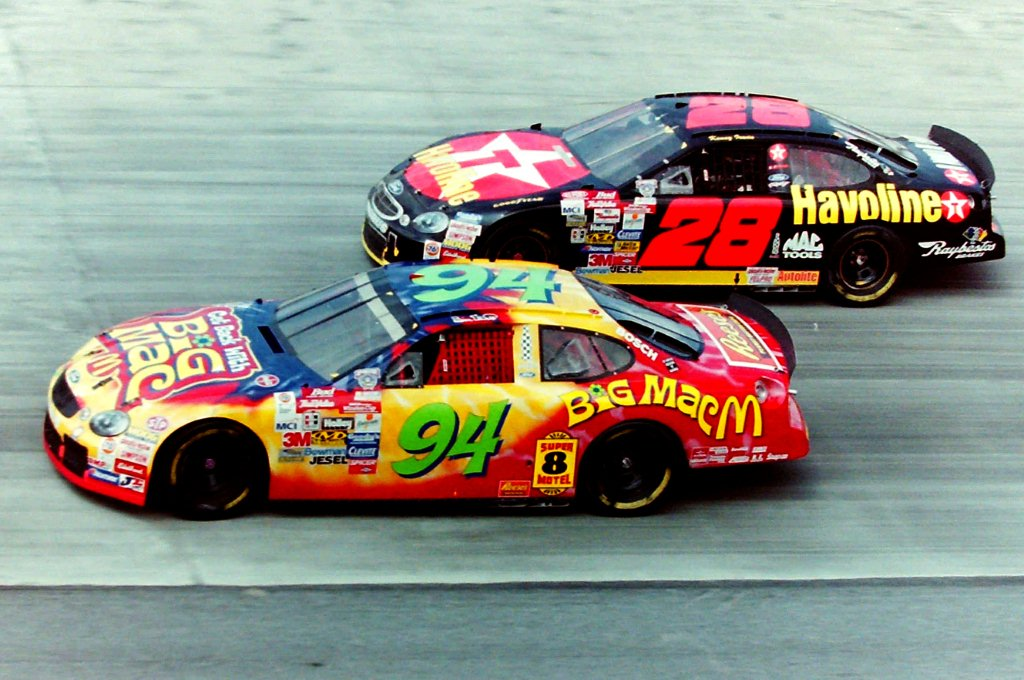
Kenseth (#94) races Kenny Irwin Jr. in his debut race at Dover

Kenseth made his first attempt at a Winston Cup Series race at Talladega in May 1998. Driving the No. 60 Ford for Roush Racing, the entry was part of an effort by Jack Roush to evaluate Kenseth and the Reiser team. However, as it was Roush's sixth entry in the race, the car lacked a competitive engine and failed to qualify for the field.

Kenseth made his next attempt at the Cup Series in 1998 at Dover, filling in for Bill Elliott in the No. 94 Ford for Elliott-Marino Racing. Elliott was absent to attend his father's funeral. Kenseth impressed by finishing sixth, marking the third-best debut for any driver. The last driver to debut with a top-ten finish before Kenseth was Rusty Wallace, who placed second at Atlanta in 1980. Kenseth also ran full-time, winning his first Busch Series race on February 22, 1998, by nudging leader Tony Stewart in the final turn. He finished 2nd in points that season, driving the No. 17 Chevy.

In 1999, Kenseth and the No. 17 Reiser Racing team were hired by Roush Racing for several Cup Series races.

=== 2000–2002 ===
In 2000, Roush Racing fielded the No. 17 team full-time in the Cup Series, with sponsorship from DeWalt. Kenseth edged out Dale Earnhardt Jr. to claim the Raybestos Rookie of the Year title. Kenseth made history as the only rookie to win the prestigious Coca-Cola 600 at Charlotte. He finished the season 14th in the standings, recording four top-ten finishes, eleven top-tens, and an average finish of 18.9.

In 2001, Kenseth finished 13th in the standings, with four top-five finishes and nine top-tens. That year, his crew chief Robbie Reiser and the pit crew won the Unocal 76 World Pit Crew Competition. In 2002, Kenseth led the series in wins with five victories and earned one pole position. However, inconsistency relegated him to an eighth-place finish in the final standings. His victories came at Rockingham, Texas, Michigan, Richmond, and Phoenix. Kenseth's pit crew also claimed their second Pit Crew Challenge title that season.

=== 2003: Championship season ===
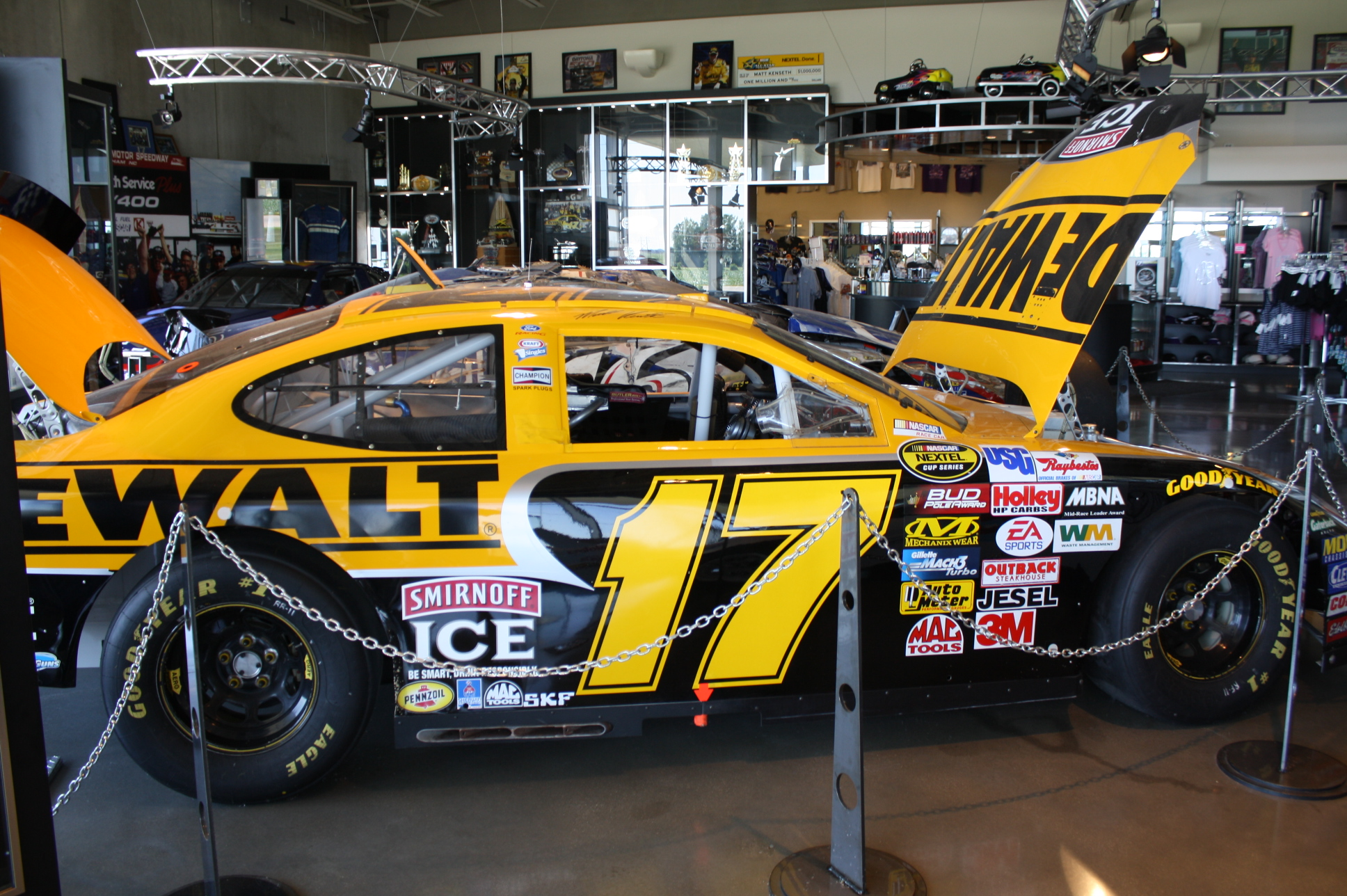
The car that Kenseth drove in 2004

In 2003, Kenseth started the season with a 20th-place finish in the Daytona 500 but quickly found his groove. Following his lone win of the season at Las Vegas, he claimed the points lead with a fourth-place finish at Atlanta in the season's fourth race. Kenseth held the top spot for an impressive 33 consecutive weeks, breaking the modern-era record of thirty weeks set by Dale Earnhardt in his 1980 championship season.

At Charlotte, Kenseth secured his second pole of the year. Throughout the race, he battled handling issues with a car that was alternately loose and tight. During a late caution, Kenseth took a gamble by staying out on the track along with a few other drivers. The strategy paid off, as he finished fourth.

Kenseth clinched the 2003 NASCAR Winston Cup title on November 9 with a fourth-place finish at Rockingham in the penultimate race, finishing 90 points ahead of runner-up Jimmie Johnson. Kenseth dominated the standings, leading for the final 33 of 36 races, and recorded a series-best 25 top-ten finishes. He spent 35 of 36 weeks in the top-ten, the only exception coming after a 20th-place finish in the Daytona 500. Kenseth's championship season included one win and eleven top-five finishes, making him the fifth different champion in five years and the third consecutive former Raybestos Rookie of the Year to win the title.

=== 2004–2005 ===
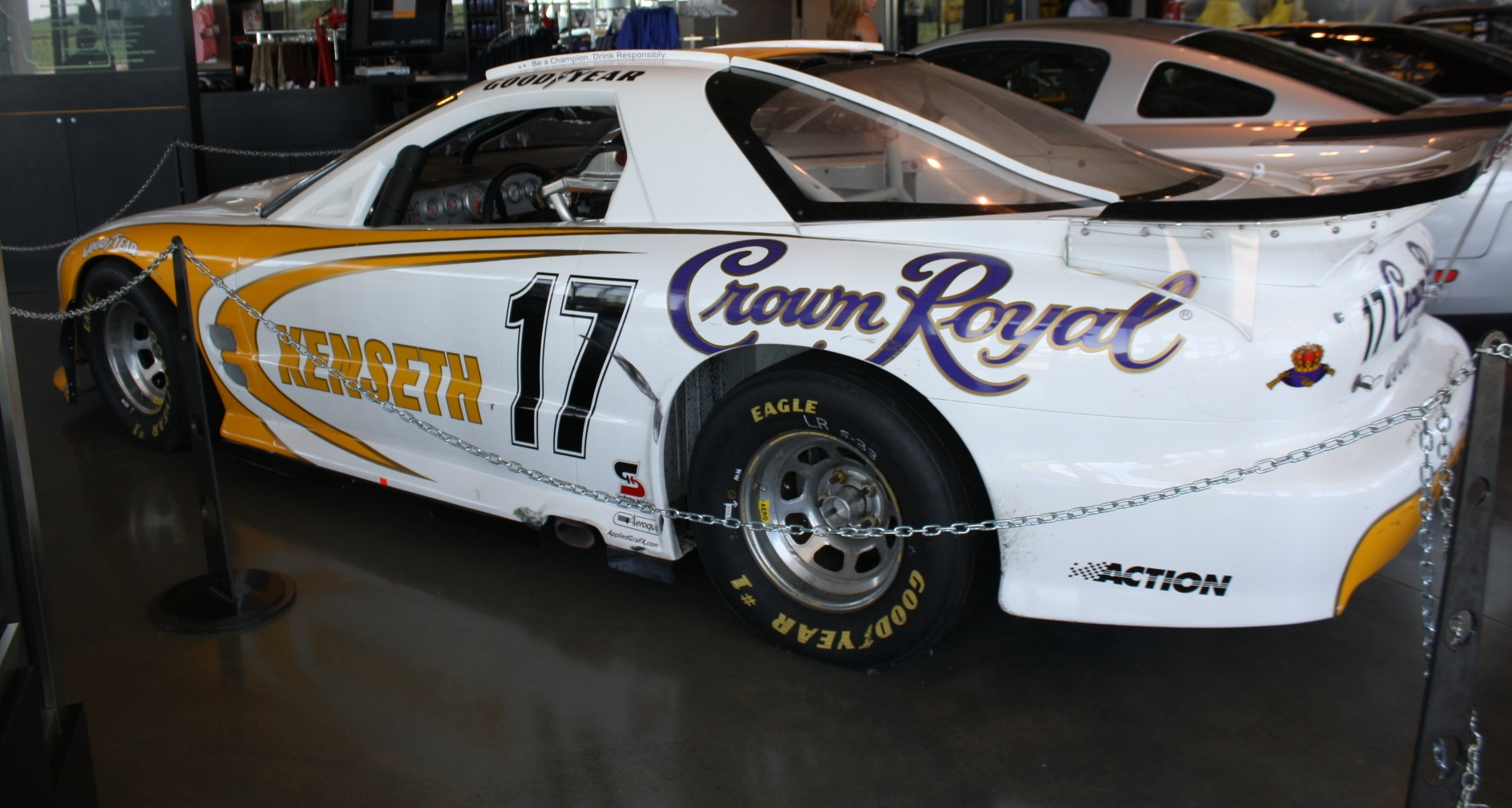
Kenseth's 2004 IROC Championship car.

In 2004, Kenseth won the International Race of Champions (IROC) championship. He qualified for the inaugural Nextel Cup Chase, starting the ten-race playoff in fifth-place and finishing eighth in the final NASCAR point standings. Kenseth secured two wins that season, both coming early in the year at Rockingham and Las Vegas. His victory in the Subway 400 at Rockingham was a thrilling photo finish against eventual Raybestos Rookie of the Year Kasey Kahne. Additionally, he won the NASCAR All-Star Race. Kenseth was one of only four drivers to rank in the top-ten throughout the entire season.

Kenseth began the 2005 season with a string of poor finishes but rebounded with a strong mid-season performance. After sitting 24th in the championship standings through fourteen races, he climbed to eighth by race 26, securing a spot in the Chase for the Cup. Kenseth finished the season 7th in the final standings, highlighted by a win at Bristol. The season also marked his two-hundredth career start. Through those first 200 starts, Kenseth had amassed one championship, ten wins, forty top-five finishes, 85 top-ten finishes, one pole position, and over US$28.5 million in earnings. He also led a career-high 1,001 laps during the season.

=== 2006–2010 ===
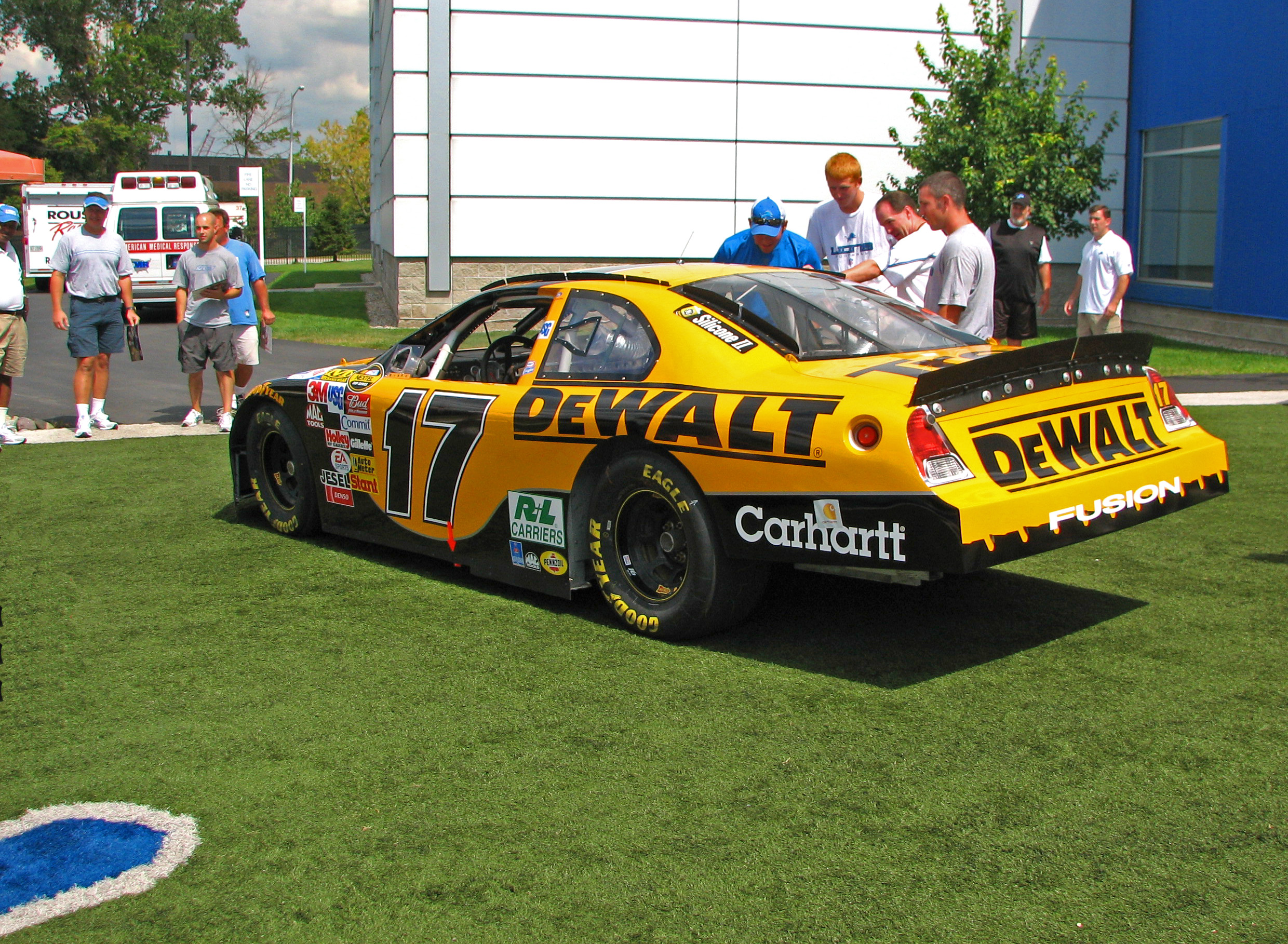
Kenseth's car at a Detroit Lions practice

Kenseth began the 2006 season by showing promise early in the Daytona 500, leading laps before spinning out after contact with Tony Stewart. Despite falling two laps down, he rallied to finish 15th. He bounced back with a victory in the second race at California Speedway and took the points lead after the eighth race at Phoenix. In the spring race at Dover, Kenseth claimed his second win of the season, charging from 6th-place with 60 laps remaining to overtake Jamie McMurray for the lead on lap 397. Later in the season, he secured a spot in the Chase for the Nextel Cup with a win at the Sharpie 500 at Bristol Motor Speedway. Kenseth finished the year as the runner-up in the Driver's Championship to Jimmie Johnson. Kenseth earned $9,524,966 (about $15,211,959 today) in winnings for the 2006 season. He spent 27 of the 36 race weeks ranked first or second in points and led 1,132 laps, the second-most of any driver that season.

Kenseth also closed out the 2006 Busch Series season with back-to-back wins, driving the No. 17 Ford Fusion to victory at Phoenix and Homestead.

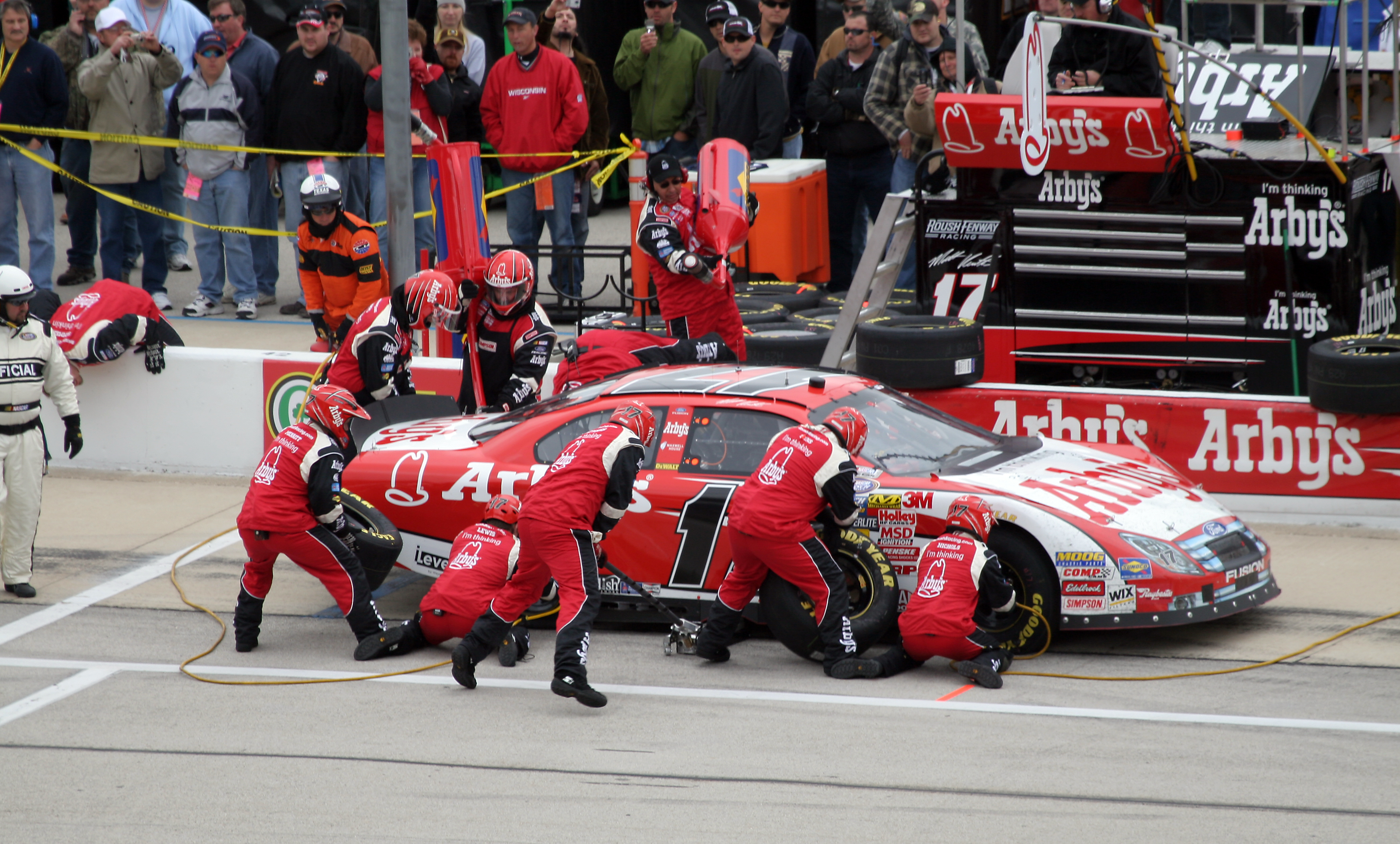
2007 Busch Series car

In the second race of the 2007 season, Kenseth won the Auto Club 500 at California Speedway. Following Jeff Gordon's wreck in the Coca-Cola 600, Kenseth became the only driver to have completed every lap of the season. However, that streak ended when he was involved in a wreck during the Citizens Bank 400 at Michigan, caused by Ryan Newman attempting to regain one of his three lost laps. The incident also snapped Kenseth's run of thirteen consecutive Top 15 finishes that season. At Watkins Glen, while Kenseth was running 7th during a red flag period, a shirtless fan approached his car and asked him to autograph a white baseball cap. Kenseth politely declined, and security escorted the fan out of the track. Kenseth later admitted he regretted not signing the cap. Kenseth won the Ford 400 at Homestead–Miami Speedway on November 18, 2007. This race marked the final event under the series title sponsor Nextel and the last to use templates based on the 1964 Holman-Moody Ford Fairlane design. Kenseth finished fourth in the series standings, extending his streak of Top 10 finishes to six consecutive seasons, tied with Jimmie Johnson for the most during that span. His efforts earned him $6,485,630 in winnings, along with an additional $100,000 from his sponsor, Safeway.

In the Busch Series, Matt Kenseth planned to compete in 23 races. He claimed victories at the Stater Brothers 300 at California Speedway in February and the O'Reilly 300 at Texas Motor Speedway in April.

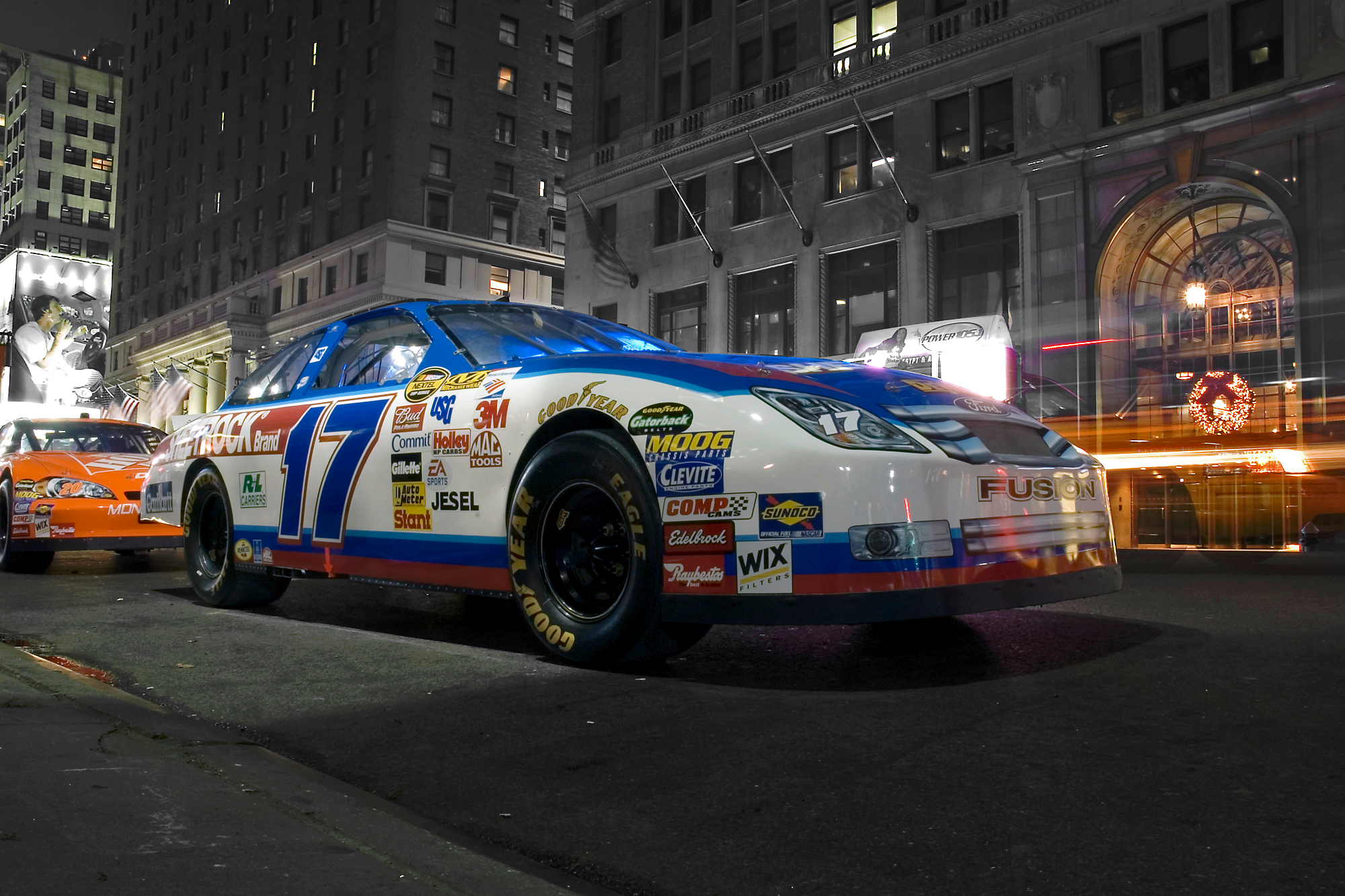
Kenseth's car in Manhattan

In 2008, Kenseth endured a winless season and dropped to 11th in points. His best performance came with a second-place finish in the fall race at Dover. Kenseth faced early challenges at the Daytona 500, starting near the back of the field. After working his way to the lead and leading two laps, he was knocked out of contention when his teammate, David Ragan, squeezed him into the wall. He finished 36th. Later in the season at the Goody's Cool Orange 500, Kenseth started 28th but finished 31st. He was penalized a lap for pitting outside his box early in the race and later spun out by David Gilliland. Kenseth retaliated by wrecking Gilliland and was penalized two laps for the incident. Despite recording five Top 10 finishes during the Chase, his streak of six consecutive seasons with at least one win and a top-ten points finish came to an end.

In the Nationwide Series, Kenseth ended an 18-race winless streak by winning the Nicorette 300 at Atlanta Motor Speedway.

In 2009, Kenseth claimed victory in the rain-shortened Daytona 500, passing Elliott Sadler just moments before a caution was triggered on lap 146 due to a crash involving Aric Almirola and Sam Hornish Jr. Shortly after, the race was red-flagged and officially called at 152 laps, securing Kenseth his first Daytona 500 win. This marked a milestone for car owner Jack Roush, as it was his first Daytona 500 victory after twenty years in the sport. Kenseth, who started at the rear of the field, led only one green-flag lap (of his seven laps led) during the race, which was his tenth attempt at "The Great American Race." Kenseth won the second race of the season, the Auto Club 500, becoming the fourth driver in NASCAR history to follow a Daytona 500 victory with a win in the next race. However, his attempt at a third consecutive win ended with engine failure at Las Vegas Motor Speedway, where he finished 43rd. Additionally, he won the pole at Darlington in the Sprint Cup Series, setting a new track record in the process. After finishing 25th at the Chevy Rock & Roll 400 at Richmond, Kenseth was bumped out of the Chase by Brian Vickers. As a result, Kenseth finished 14th in points.

In the Nationwide Series, during the Aaron's 312 on April 25, Kenseth was involved in a dramatic crash. On lap 104, his car flipped 3.5 times, slid on its roof, and completed a fourth flip. The car burst into flames, but Kenseth miraculously walked away unharmed.

In 2010, after the Daytona 500, Drew Blickensderfer was released as crew chief of the No. 17 team, with Todd Parrott named as his replacement. Later in the season, Parrott was replaced by Jimmy Fennig. Despite not winning a race, Kenseth made the Chase for the Sprint Cup based on his consistency, ultimately finishing fifth in the final standings. In Nationwide Series, he won the Diamond Hill Plywood 200 at Darlington Raceway by leading only the final four laps, three under caution, after Kyle Busch suffered a flat tire just before a Green–white–checkered finish.

=== 2011 ===
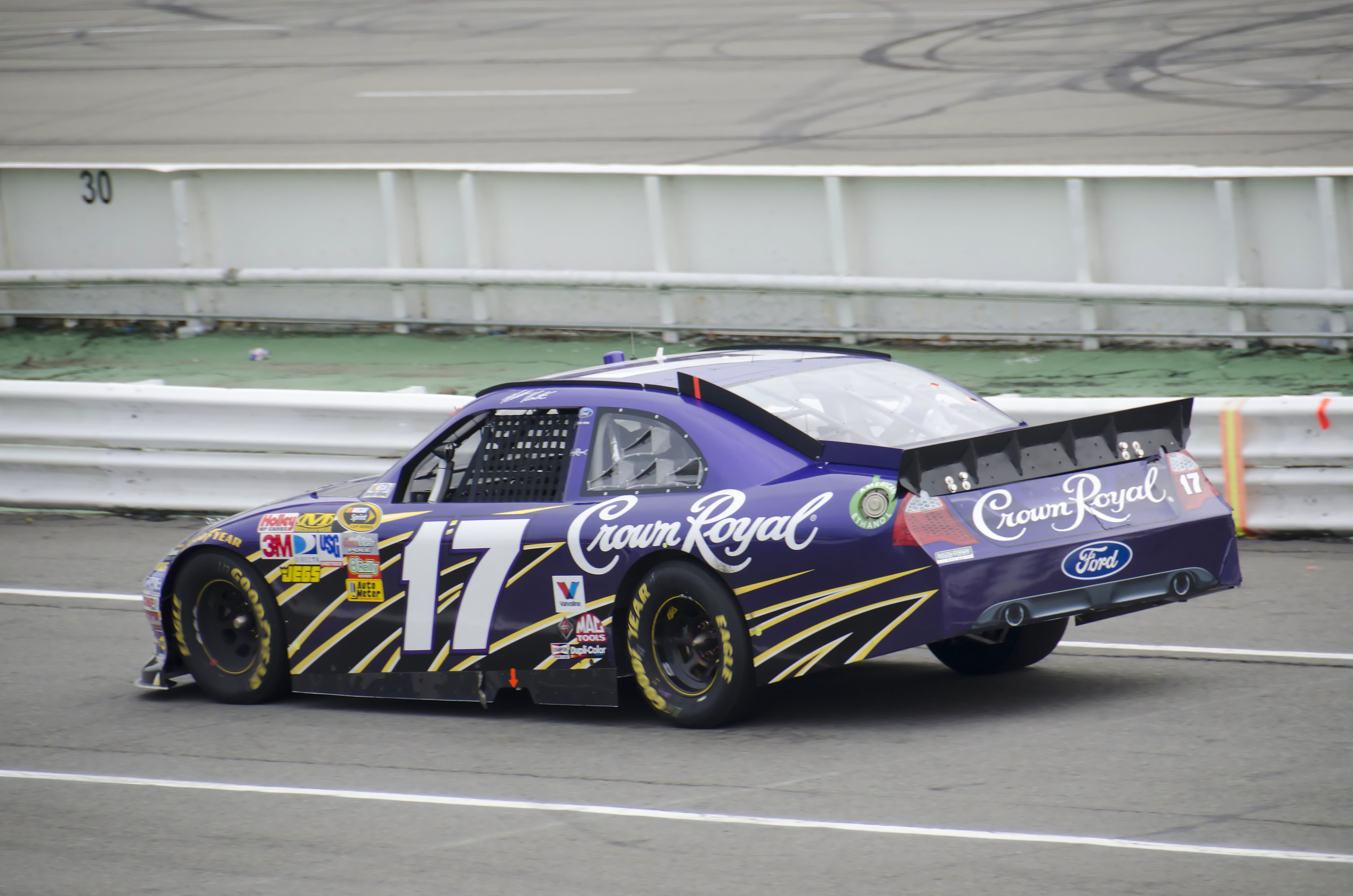
Matt Kenseth's No. 17 Crown Royal Ford at Pocono Raceway in 2011

During the third race of the 2011 season, Kenseth secured his fifth career pole by setting a new track record at Las Vegas Motor Speedway. A few races later, he ended a 76-race winless streak by winning at Texas Motor Speedway on April 9, 2011. Kenseth also claimed victory at the FedEx 400 at Dover International Speedway. A late caution prompted Kenseth and crew chief Jimmy Fennig to gamble with a two-tire pit stop instead of four, a strategy that proved decisive as Kenseth secured his second win in five races. Later in the season, Kenseth earned his third win at the Bank of America 500 at Charlotte Motor Speedway after qualifying for the Chase for the Sprint Cup. However, his hopes for a second championship were derailed by multiple on-track incidents with Brian Vickers.

In the Nationwide Series, on May 28, 2011, Kenseth won the Top Gear 300 at Charlotte while filling in for Trevor Bayne. Kenseth passed teammate Carl Edwards with two laps remaining to secure victory in his only Nationwide Series start that season.

=== 2012: Final Season At Roush ===
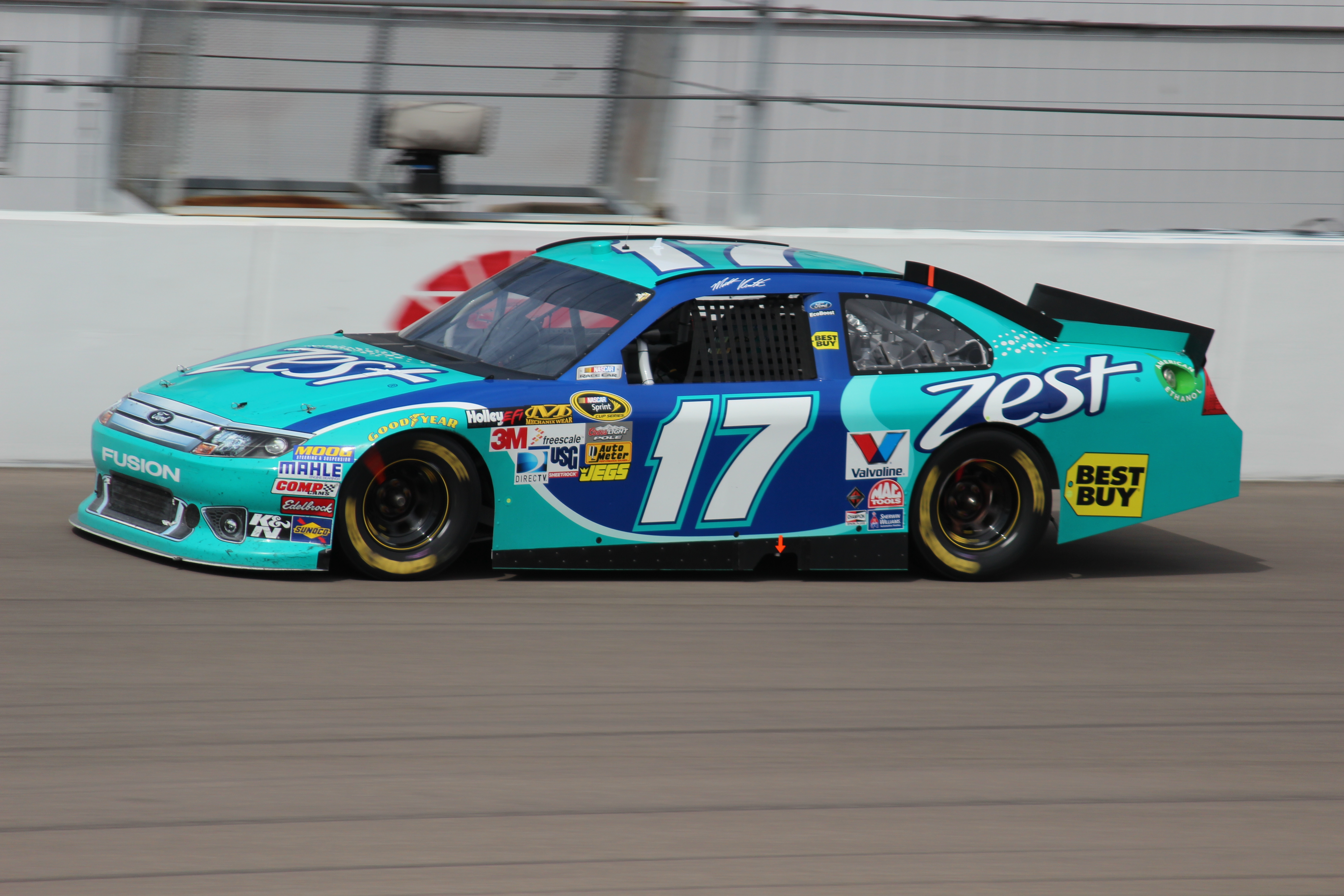
Kenseth at 2012 Kobalt Tools 400

Kenseth's 2012 season began with a victory at the Daytona 500, marking his second win at the prestigious race. On June 26, 2012, it was announced that Kenseth would leave Roush Fenway Racing at the end of the season. While speculation swirled about his plans for 2013, Kenseth remained tight-lipped, responding simply, "No," when asked by reporters for a hint about his future team. On August 25, during the Irwin Tools Night Race at Bristol, Kenseth collided with Tony Stewart while battling for the lead on lap 332. Neither driver yielded entering Turn 1, resulting in a crash. Frustrated, Stewart threw his helmet at Kenseth's car as it exited pit road. Both drivers had previously overcome being a lap down but were ultimately taken out of contention for the win.

On September 4, 2012, Joe Gibbs Racing officially announced that Kenseth would join the team for the 2013 season. Kenseth would drive the No. 20 Toyota, replacing Joey Logano.

On October 7, 2012, Kenseth claimed his second win of the year by taking victory in the Talladega fall race. He led 33 laps, the second-most of the race, and secured the win as a multi-car crash unfolded behind him.

On October 21, 2012, Kenseth secured his third win of the season and second during the 2012 Chase, triumphing at the freshly repaved Kansas Speedway. The new pavement made the track slick, leading to a record fourteen cautions over 66 laps during the Hollywood Casino 400. This marked Kenseth's first victory at Kansas, his 24th career win, and his final triumph with Roush Fenway Racing.

=== 2013: First Season At JGR ===
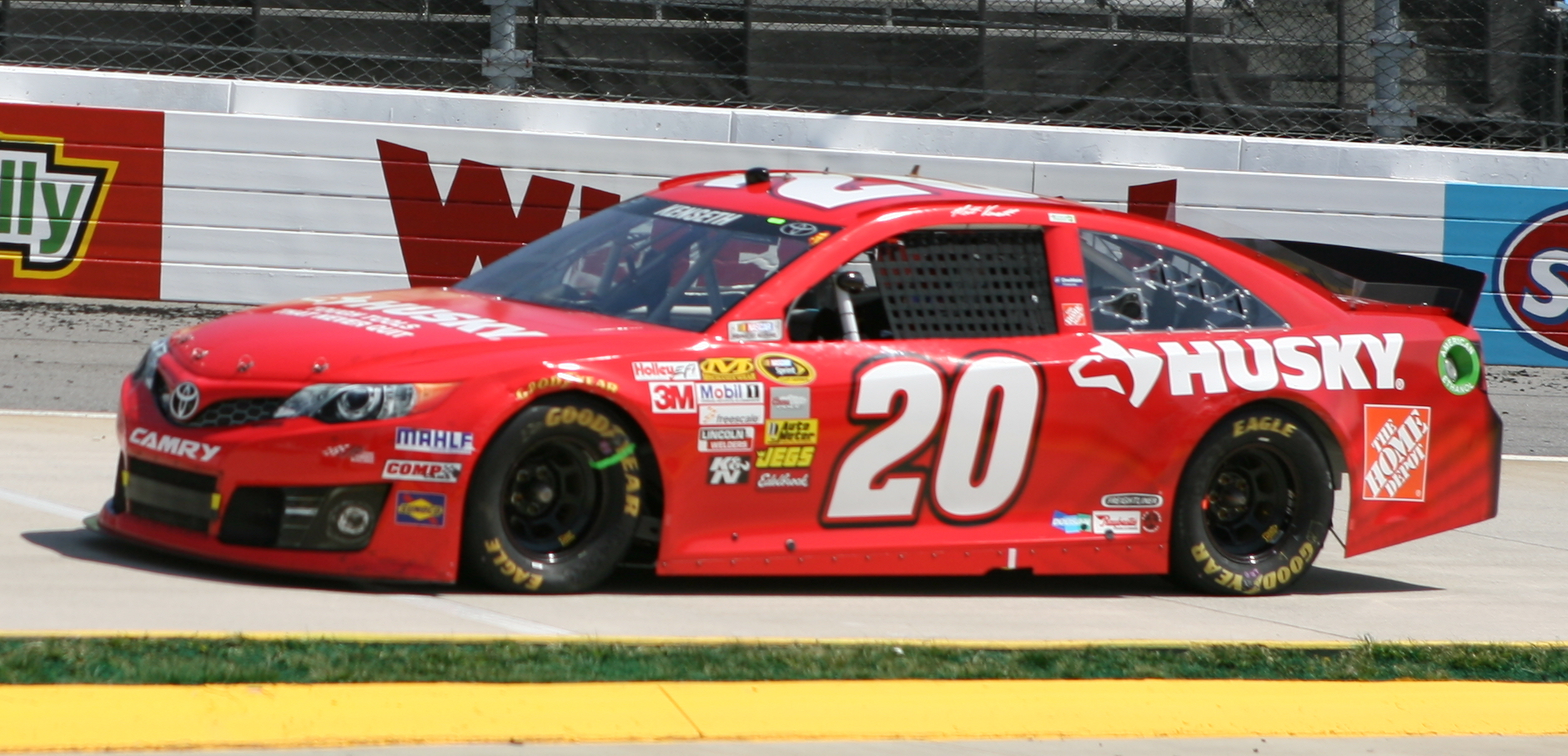
Kenseth's No. 20 Toyota during the 2013 STP Gas Booster 500

In the 2013 Daytona 500, Kenseth had a strong performance, leading a race-high 86 laps. However, his day ended prematurely on lap 149 due to engine failure, resulting in a 37th-place finish. Later that season, at Las Vegas, Kenseth secured his first victory in the No. 20 car, becoming only the third driver in NASCAR history—after Kyle Busch and Cale Yarborough—to win a race on their birthday. He held off Kasey Kahne to claim the victory.

At Kansas, Kenseth won the pole, led the most laps, and held off Kahne to secure the victory. However, post-race inspection revealed one of the engine's eight connecting rods was three grams under the legal weight limit. As a result, Kenseth was penalized fifty points, his pole award and win were revoked, and the victory no longer counted toward Chase points. Crew chief Jason Ratcliff was fined US$200,000 and suspended for one race. Car owner Joe Gibbs was docked six races' worth of owner points, and Toyota lost manufacturer points for five races. Gibbs appealed the penalties, and two weeks later, the appeals board ruled that the sanctions were overly harsh. Kenseth regained 38 of the fifty points, reducing his penalty to twelve points and moving him up to fourth in the standings. His pole award and win were reinstated, giving him two poles and two official wins. Gibbs' owner points penalty was reduced to one race, while Ratcliff's suspension and the US$200,000 fine remained unchanged. Toyota's manufacturer points penalty was increased to seven races.

At the Southern 500 at Darlington, Kenseth passed teammate Kyle Busch with ten laps to go, securing his third victory of the season and his first-ever Sprint Cup Series win at the track. Later at Kentucky, Kenseth capitalized on Jimmie Johnson's spin to take the lead and held off Jamie McMurray to claim his fourth win of the year. Following a few challenging weeks, Kenseth bounced back at Bristol, where he outdueled Kahne for the third time that season to earn his fifth victory.

With five regular-season wins, Kenseth was the top seed in the Chase. He started strong by holding off Kyle Busch to win the first two Chase races at Chicagoland and Loudon, marking his first victories at both tracks. The win at Loudon also made Kenseth just the second driver, alongside Richard Petty, to win in his five-hundredth race start. Additionally, the victory moved him into 22nd place on the all-time wins list, surpassing Rex White.

Heading into the season finale at Homestead, only three drivers could win the Chase. Kenseth trailed Jimmie Johnson by 28 points and led Kevin Harvick by five. Kenseth started on the pole, with Harvick sixth and Johnson seventh. Kenseth dominated, leading a race-high 144 laps for the bonus point. His only setback came after a restart with 74 laps to go, when Jeff Gordon spun his tires, causing a chain reaction. Kenseth and Johnson made contact, dropping Kenseth to 12th and Johnson to 26th. Kenseth fought back to finish second behind teammate Denny Hamlin. He ended the season nineteen points behind Johnson in the final standings. With seven wins, Kenseth secured more victories for the No. 20 car in a single season than it had ever achieved with Tony Stewart or Joey Logano behind the wheel. It was also a career best for Kenseth, surpassing his five wins in 2002.

In the Nationwide Series, Kenseth returned for sixteen races, securing seven top-five finishes, fourteen top-ten finishes, and wins at Daytona in the summer and Kansas in the fall.

=== 2014 ===
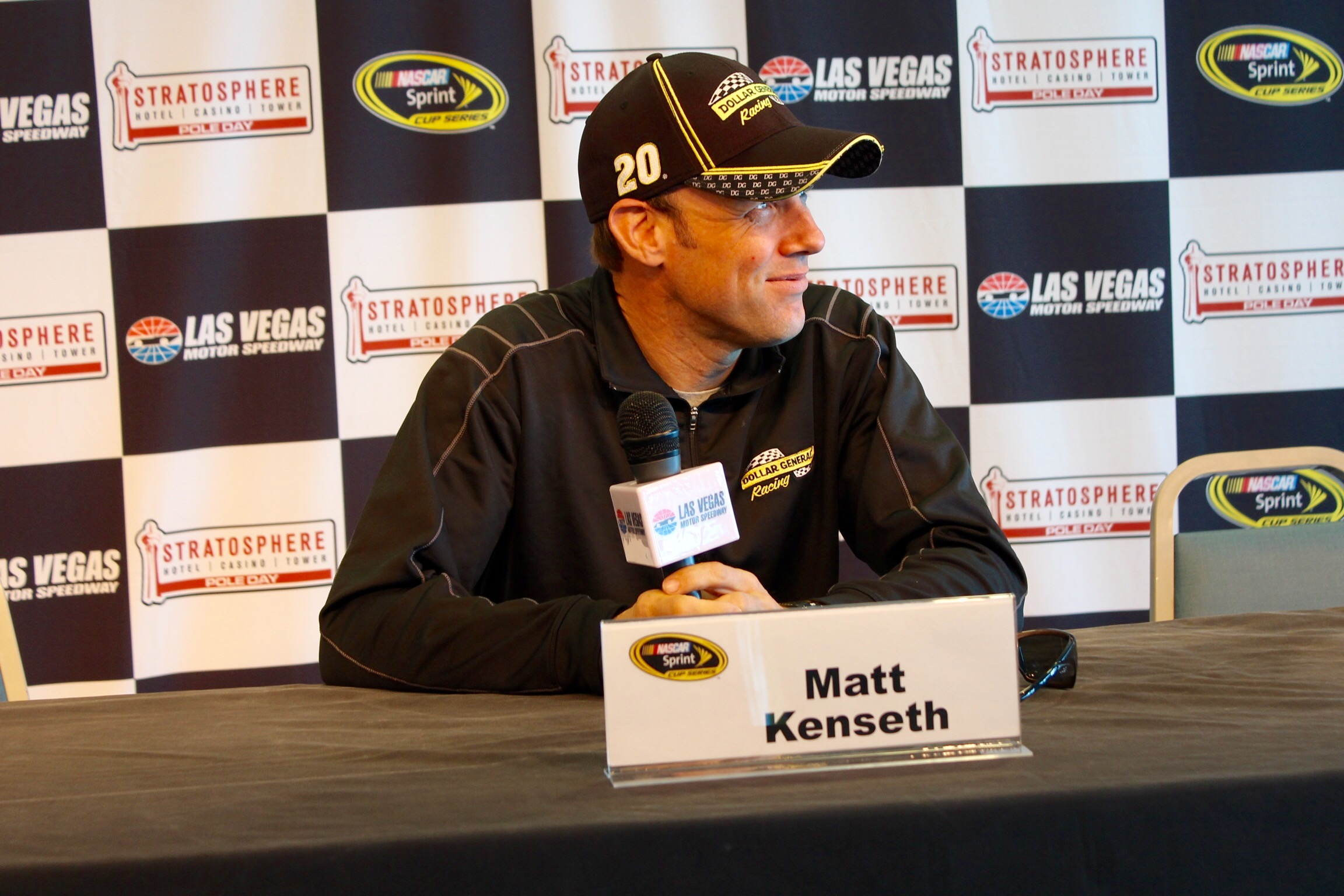
Kenseth at Las Vegas Motor Speedway

In 2014, at Daytona, Kenseth won the first of two Budweiser Duels, holding off Kevin Harvick (whose race was later disqualified) and Kasey Kahne in a thrilling three-wide finish. This victory secured Kenseth a third-place starting position in the Daytona 500. Although he did not lead any laps during the race, Kenseth finished 6th.

With the new Chase format, Kenseth did not win any races but still advanced. His best finish was 2nd at Atlanta, where Kahne passed him for the lead with fresh tires during the second Green-White-Checkered attempt. Kenseth led all winless drivers in points and, despite having no wins, managed to make it through the first two elimination rounds.

During the second round at Charlotte, a caution with seventy laps remaining set up a restart where Brad Keselowski restarted 2nd and Kenseth restarted 4th. Kenseth attempted a three-wide pass on the outside of Keselowski, but Keselowski moved up the track, causing contact between Kenseth's car and Keselowski's right-rear bumper. This resulted in Kenseth hitting the wall. He dropped to 18th and fell a lap down due to the damage, but regained the lap as the lucky dog after another caution. While under caution, Kenseth, frustrated with the earlier contact, slammed into Keselowski's right front, causing damage to Keselowski's car. On a restart with two laps remaining, Keselowski pushed Kenseth's teammate, Denny Hamlin, to get him going. Kenseth finished 19th, while Keselowski came in 16th. After the race, Hamlin brake-checked Keselowski, leading to minor contact. Keselowski drove around Hamlin and pursued Kenseth, who was entering pit road. Kenseth slightly turned, causing Keselowski to miss a major hit, but Keselowski did bump Kenseth's door. In the process, Keselowski unintentionally bumped Tony Stewart's car. Stewart responded by putting his car in reverse and ramming Keselowski's car hard. Once out of their cars, tensions escalated. Hamlin attempted to confront Keselowski but was held back. Meanwhile, as Keselowski walked between two haulers, Kenseth charged in and physically attacked him. Keselowski's crew chief, Paul Wolfe, restrained Kenseth, but Kenseth's crew intervened, pulling Wolfe away to restrain both men. Kenseth's mechanic, Jesse Sanders, and crew chief, Jason Ratcliff, were later summoned to the NASCAR hauler. No punches were thrown, so Kenseth and Hamlin were not penalized. However, NASCAR fined Keselowski and Stewart and placed them on probation for their actions on pit road.

The following week at Talladega, Kenseth matched his season-best finish with a second-place result, advancing to the Eliminator Round, while his rival Keselowski won the race. In the Eliminator Round, the field was narrowed to eight drivers.

At Martinsville, Kenseth entered a turn at high speed, causing his car to wheel-hop and collide with Kevin Harvick, who was still in contention for the Chase. The impact sent Harvick into the wall, dropping him 42 laps behind. After the initial contact, a sideways Kenseth was bumped by Tony Stewart, which straightened out Kenseth's car without further damage. Later in the race, Harvick, having returned to the track, attempted to retaliate. He slowed down deliberately as Kenseth approached, trying to damage Kenseth's radiator. However, Kenseth anticipated the move and slowed enough to avoid significant damage. Despite the drama, Kenseth managed to finish sixth, holding onto 4th-place in the Chase standings. Harvick, meanwhile, finished 33rd. Frustrated, Harvick reportedly vowed that if this race cost him a shot at advancing in the Chase, he would ensure Kenseth didn't make it either.

In Texas, Kenseth secured his second pole of the season but finished 25th in the race. At Phoenix, he started fifth, led no laps, and finished third, narrowly missing a spot in the Championship 4 by just three points. In the season finale at Homestead, Kenseth again led no laps and finished sixth, ending the season seventh in the standings.

That same weekend, Kenseth salvaged his season with a victory in the Ford EcoBoost 300, his final Nationwide Series win. Also in 2014, while driving the No. 20 car in nineteen races, he earned ten top-five finishes and fifteen top-ten finishes.

=== 2015 ===
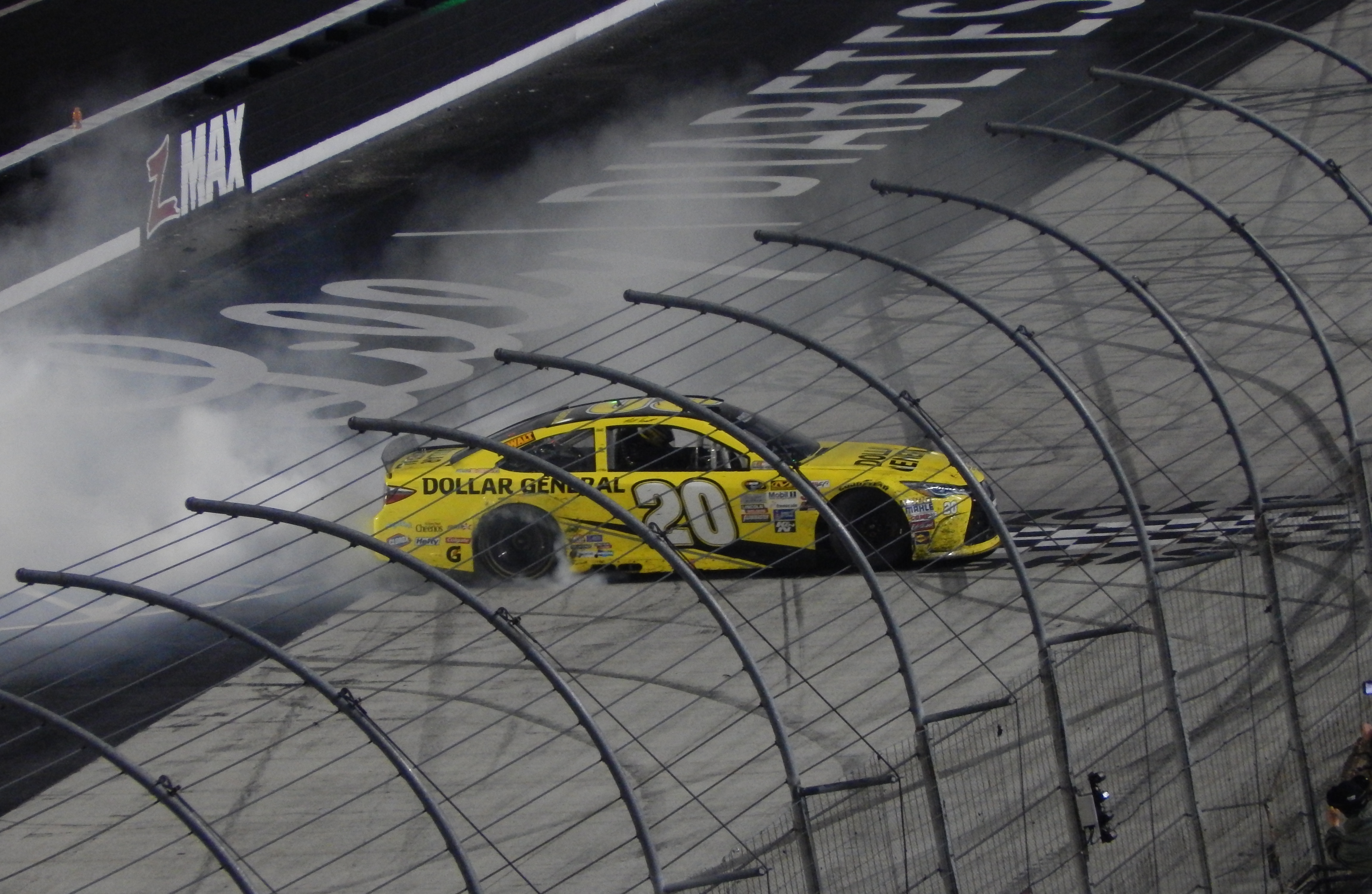
Kenseth ended a 51-race winless streak at the Food City 500.

Kenseth began the 2015 NASCAR Sprint Cup Series season with a win at the Sprint Unlimited, marking the first victory for the newly redesigned Toyota Camry. Starting 16th, Kenseth led 21 laps and held off Martin Truex Jr. for the victory. However, his Daytona 500 campaign ended early with a crash on lap 41, leaving him with a 35th-place finish. Kenseth's season saw a mix of highs and lows in the following weeks. He broke a 51-race winless streak by claiming the pole position and winning the Food City 500. Later in the season, he secured his second pole at the Coca-Cola 600. Despite a late-race caution, Kenseth stayed out rather than pitting, which resulted in a strong fourth-place finish. At the Toyota/Save Mart 350, he qualified third, marking his best-ever starting position on a road course.

At Pocono, Kenseth started seventh and claimed victory on the final lap after several drivers ran out of fuel, earning his first win at the track and second of the season. At Watkins Glen, he qualified 26th and finished fourth, marking his first top-five finish at the road course. Kenseth secured his third pole position of the year in the Pure Michigan 400 and went on to win his third race of the season. This victory elevated him to 20th on the all-time wins list with 34 career wins, surpassing Dale Jarrett, Fireball Roberts, and Kyle Busch. In the final race of the regular season, Kenseth started second, dominated by leading 352 of 400 laps, and earned his fourth win of the season. This tied him with Busch and Jimmie Johnson for the most wins heading into the Chase for the Sprint Cup.

In the first race of the Chase at Chicago, Kenseth started 12th, led one lap, and finished fifth. At New Hampshire, he capitalized on Kevin Harvick running out of fuel with three laps remaining, taking the lead and securing his fifth win of the year to advance to the second round of the Chase. In Dover, rain awarded Kenseth the pole as the points leader. He led 25 laps and finished seventh, maintaining his points lead. At Talladega, Kenseth started in the second row but crashed on the final green-white-checkered finish, finishing 26th and being eliminated in the Contender Round.

=== Feud with Joey Logano and Return to Homestead after suspension ===
During the Hollywood Casino 400, Kenseth led the most laps but was spun out by Joey Logano with five laps remaining, costing him a spot in the Eliminator Round.

At Martinsville, Kenseth spent much of the race running in the Top 10 before being involved in a crash. Brad Keselowski hit Kenseth after breaking a tie rod, causing significant damage to Kenseth's car and forcing him to lose nine laps for repairs. Upon returning to the track, Kenseth intentionally wrecked race leader Logano in retaliation for being spun out of the lead by Logano two weeks earlier at Kansas. The crowd erupted in cheers and applause following Kenseth's actions, but NASCAR immediately disqualified him. After the race, Kenseth was summoned to the NASCAR hauler and later suspended for two races, along with a probation period initially set at six months. Team owner Joe Gibbs appealed the penalty, arguing it was unprecedented and unfair. While the probation period was reduced to end on December 31, 2015, the two-race suspension was upheld by both the appeals panel and Final Appeals Officer Bryan Moss.

During his suspension, Kenseth was replaced by young talent Erik Jones, who delivered impressive finishes for a rookie, placing 12th and 19th.

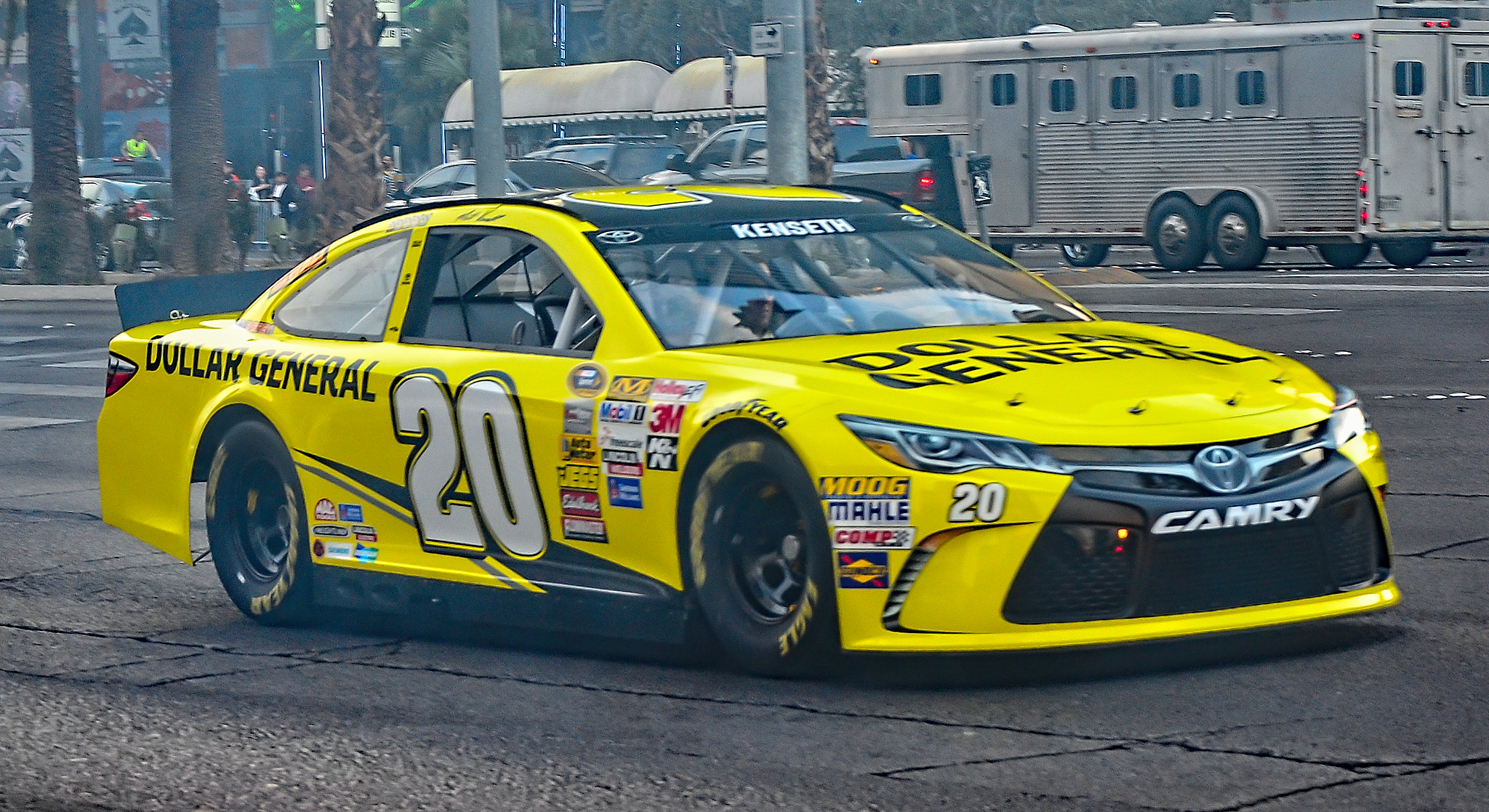
Kenseth at the 2015 NASCAR Victory Lap event on the Las Vegas Strip

After his suspension, NASCAR President Brian France met with Kenseth and Logano to address lingering tensions. Initially, Kenseth claimed a tire failure caused him to crash into Logano. However, after serving his suspension, he admitted the move was deliberate and expressed no remorse. Kenseth's actions effectively ended Logano's chances of advancing to the final round of the Chase. Fans cheered for Kenseth as Logano struggled, including a 40th place finish at Texas after cutting a tire and spinning out, and a third place finish at the rain-shortened Quicken Loans Race for Heroes 500 in Phoenix, eliminating him from championship contention.

At Homestead–Miami Speedway, Kenseth started 19th and finished seventh, marking his twentieth top-ten finish of the season. He ultimately ended the season 15th in the standings.

=== 2016 ===
Kenseth began the season with a strong showing in the Daytona 500, leading forty laps in the final stages. He took the white flag but was passed by teammates Denny Hamlin and Martin Truex Jr.. A failed blocking attempt sent Kenseth sideways, causing him to lose several positions. He finished 14th, while Hamlin won in a historic finish. In Atlanta, Kenseth was penalized for "improper fueling" during a green flag pit stop and had to serve a pass-through penalty. He was also black-flagged for not pitting within three laps. After serving the penalty, he finished 31st, two laps down, and later explained he hadn't seen or heard the penalty flag. Despite this, he finished 19th. At Las Vegas, Kenseth was involved in a multi-car wreck with Chase Elliott, Kurt Busch, and Carl Edwards, ultimately finishing 37th.

At Talladega, Kenseth started fourth and led 39 of the first 71 laps before being involved in a late-race wreck with Joey Logano, causing Kenseth to barrel-roll onto his roof. After the race, Kenseth exchanged words with Logano, accusing him of forcing him off the track just before the crash. In a post-race interview, Kenseth warned Logano, saying, "You're going to race me right before I'm finished racing." However, the following week, both drivers resolved their differences with a phone call.

At the restart following a caution at Dover, Kenseth lined up on the inside front row next to Jimmie Johnson. Johnson appeared to get a great start but struggled to shift into 4th gear, triggering an eighteen-car wreck. Kenseth managed to avoid the chaos, and a red flag was waved. With ten laps remaining, Kenseth found it difficult to hold off Kyle Larson. However, when third-place driver Chase Elliott challenged Larson, Kenseth had no trouble securing the victory, ending a 17-race winless streak.

At the first New Hampshire race of the season, Kenseth secured his second win of the year and his 38th career victory, holding off Tony Stewart. This win marked Kenseth's second consecutive victory at New Hampshire. The triumph also moved him into 19th-place on the all-time wins list, surpassing Bobby Isaac and teammate Kyle Busch. However, after the race, Joe Gibbs Racing was penalized 15 owner and driver points for failing the post-race inspection at New Hampshire. The car did not pass the Laser Inspection Station (LIS), leading NASCAR to impose a P3 penalty, which dropped Kenseth from eighth to ninth in the standings. Crew chief Jason Ratcliff was also fined US$25,000.

In the Chase race at Phoenix, Kenseth was leading late, but a late-race restart saw him wreck with Alex Bowman, ending his championship hopes. Kenseth finished fifth in points.

=== 2017: Final Season At JGR ===
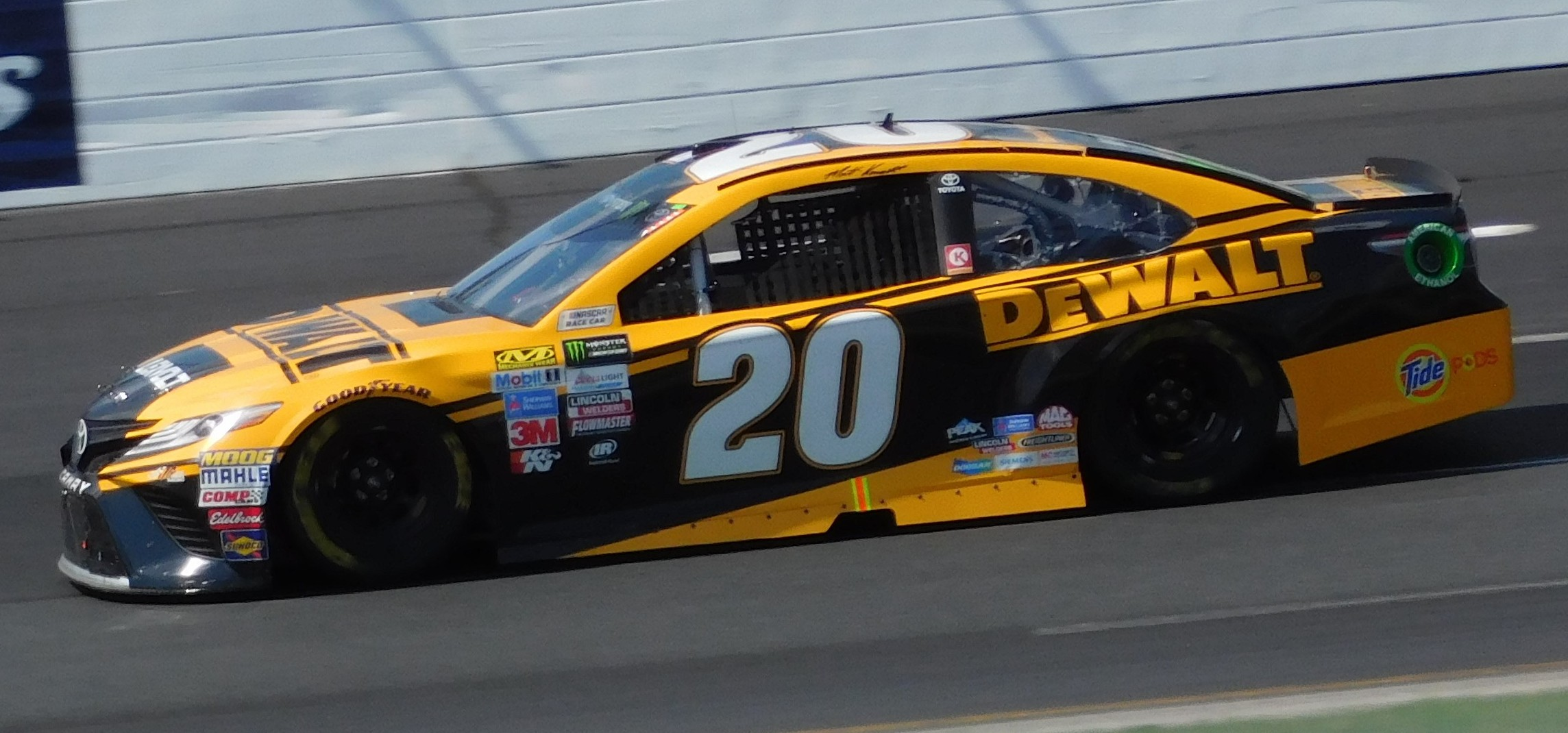
Kenseth during the 2017 Overton's 301

Kenseth lost his Dollar General sponsor before the season, prompting Dewalt to increase its sponsorship to fifteen races. Tide came on for three races, starting with the Phoenix race, and added a fourth at Martinsville. Peak and BlueDef sponsored Las Vegas and Auto Club. Circle K joined mid-season, backing six races, beginning at Richmond, where Kenseth earned his first pole and stage win. They added an extra race due to a sponsorship gap. Despite these deals, the team relied on Toyotacare as a fill-in sponsor at Texas and Dover. After a slow start, Kenseth rebounded, contending for a playoff spot with Clint Bowyer and Joey Logano. He finished second at Watkins Glen, his best road-course result, and earned the pole at the regular-season finale in Richmond. Kenseth made the playoffs for the thirteenth time despite a 38th-place finish, leading much of Stage 1 before a brake lock-up caused a caution. He avoided further issues and secured the final playoff spot, edging Bowyer, Erik Jones, and Logano.

On July 11, 2017, Joe Gibbs Racing announced that Erik Jones would replace Kenseth in the No. 20 car for the 2018 season, leaving Kenseth without a ride. On November 4, 2017, Kenseth revealed that he would take time off from the sport. With two races remaining in the 2017 season, Kenseth had yet to secure a victory and was eliminated from the playoffs after a disqualification. His pit crew had an eighth member step over the wall to help repair his car after a wreck, resulting in the penalty. Despite receiving offers from lesser-known team owners to drive in 2018, Kenseth chose to turn them down.

At Phoenix, Kenseth passed Chase Elliott with nine laps remaining to win his first race of the year, ending a 51-race winless streak."Yeah, it's really not describable," Kenseth said. "With only two (races) left, I didn't think we probably had a good chance of getting back to Victory Lane. It's been, I don't know how many races – somebody's probably going to tell me tonight – but it"s been at least 50 or 60, so it's been a long time. We've had a lot of close ones. Just felt like it was never meant to be, and today it was meant to be.... I've got to be honest with you, I never dreamed I'd win one of these races, so obviously I've been so incredibly blessed throughout my whole career." This win marked his 39th, tying him with Tim Flock for 19th-place on the all-time wins list.

DeWalt sponsored Kenseth for his final race with JGR at Homestead–Miami, with his car featuring a paint scheme reminiscent of his rookie design from 2000. Kenseth finished in 8th-place in the race and ultimately secured seventh in the official points standings.

=== 2018 ===
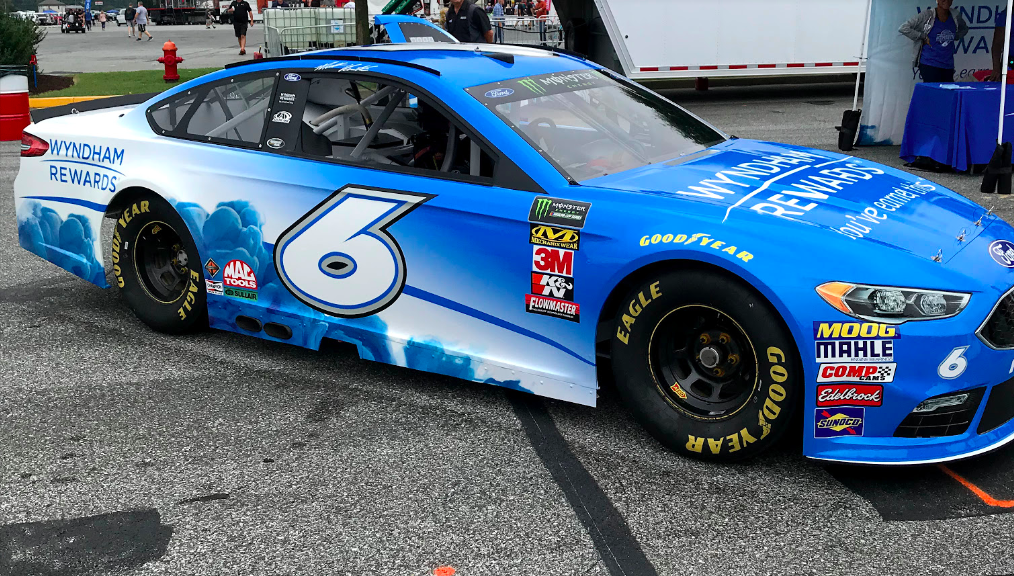
Kenseth's showcar at Dover International Speedway in 2018

In April 2018, Roush Fenway Racing announced that Kenseth would return to the team to drive the No. 6 Ford on a part-time basis, sharing the car with full-time driver Trevor Bayne. Kenseth's schedule, which included seven races starting with the KC Masterpiece 400 at Kansas, was supported by Wyndham Rewards as a sponsor.

For the Kansas race, his first since November 2017, Kenseth started from the rear after failing to set a qualifying time due to not passing inspection. He finished 36th after being involved in a crash on lap 254.

Due to his 2003 Championship, as well as victories in the 2004 event and the fall 2017 Phoenix race, Kenseth was eligible for the All-Star Race. He started from the pole and finished 14th. After a series of mediocre results, Kenseth found his form late in the summer. He won the second stage of the Brickyard 400 and finished 12th. Kenseth earned his first top-ten of the season at the Phoenix fall race with a seventh-place finish. In his final race for RFR at Homestead, he finished sixth.

=== 2019 ===
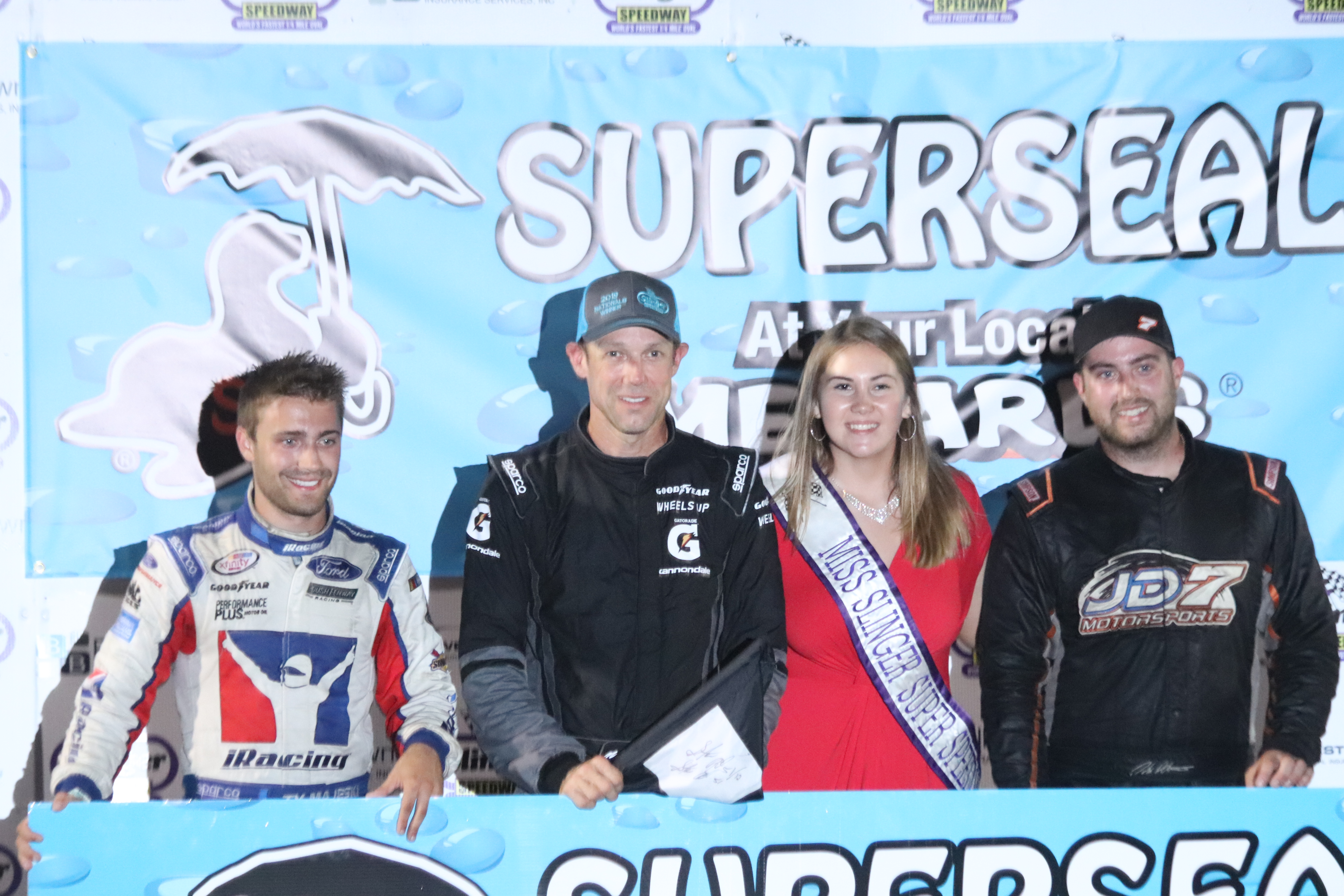
Kenseth (2nd from left) along with Ty Majeski (left) at the 2019 Slinger Nationals

Kenseth returned to racing in July 2019, making his first start since Homestead–Miami in a Super Late Model at the Slinger Nationals. He extended his race-record win total to eight by passing former Roush teammate Ty Majeski on the final lap. Later that year, Kenseth served as the grand marshal for the CTECH Manufacturing 180 at Road America. He also appeared on Coffee with Kyle, a series on NBC Sports hosted by Kyle Petty.

=== 2020 ===
On April 27, 2020, Kenseth was announced as the replacement for Kyle Larson in the No. 42 Chevrolet for Chip Ganassi Racing for the remainder of the season, after Larson was released for using a racial slur during an iRacing event two weeks earlier. NASCAR granted Kenseth a waiver for eligibility in the 2020 playoffs. In his return to racing, Kenseth finished 10th at Darlington on May 17, 2020, marking his 330th career top-ten finish. He later secured a season-best second-place finish on July 5, 2020, at Indianapolis Motor Speedway, which turned out to be his only top-five and final top-ten result of the season. On September 21, 2020, Chip Ganassi Racing announced that Ross Chastain would replace Kenseth in 2021. Kenseth concluded the season with a 25th-place finish at the Phoenix finale, the site of his final career victory, and finished 28th in the overall standings.

In a November 18, 2020, interview with the Wisconsin State Journal, Kenseth stated that he was "almost 100 percent certain" he would not return to full-time NASCAR racing, choosing instead to focus on late models and sports cars.

=== 2023 ===
On May 4, 2022, it was announced that Kenseth, along with Hershel McGriff and Kirk Shelmerdine, would be part of the NASCAR Hall of Fame Class of 2023. On August 2, 2023, the Southeastern Wisconsin Short Track Racing Hall of Fame announced Kenseth's induction into their 2024 class, after a scheduling conflict prevented him from joining the Class of 2023. On October 10, 2023, it was announced that Kenseth would join Legacy Motor Club as the team's competition advisor.

== Championship controversy ==
After the 2003 season, Kenseth's championship sparked controversy and criticism of the Winston Cup points system. Critics, including Roger Penske, questioned how a driver could win the season championship with only one victory in 36 races. Kenseth led the points standings for 33 weeks despite his lone win and had already clinched the title with one race remaining, making the final event essentially meaningless. This led to discussions about revising the system to prevent similar scenarios. By comparison, in 2000, Bobby Labonte also clinched the championship one race early under the same system, but he had four wins and led the standings for 31 of 34 races. Kenseth's 2003 season included eleven top-five finishes and 25 top-ten finishes.

In 2004, NASCAR introduced a new points and playoff system called "The Chase for the Nextel Cup," following Nextel Communications replacing Winston as the primary sponsor of its top series. The system established a ten-race playoff, limiting championship contention to the top-ten drivers in points after the first 26 races and placing greater emphasis—and a points premium—on race wins. This change became informally known as "The Matt Kenseth Rule," referencing Kenseth's 2003 championship season, during which he won only one race but secured the title through consistent finishes. Although NASCAR denied that Kenseth's championship directly influenced the creation of The Chase, officials acknowledged that the 2003 outcome brought attention to the issue. NASCAR stated it had been exploring ways to reward race wins more heavily since 2000. Nevertheless, the timing of the format's debut in 2004 and Kenseth's 2003 title created a perceived connection, which NASCAR officials referenced in interviews and press releases when announcing the new system.

== Personal life ==
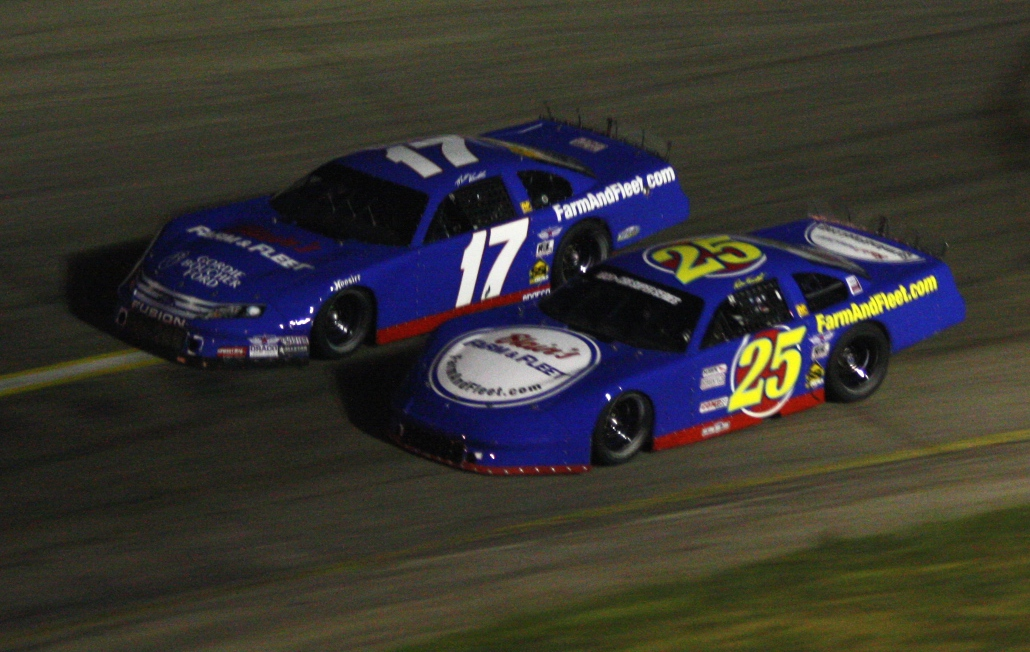
Kenseth racing against his son Ross

Kenseth is the son of Roy and Nicola Sue Kenseth. In 2000, he married Katie Martin (no relation to Mark Martin), who is also from Cambridge. Together, Matt and Katie have four daughters. Kenseth also has a son, Ross Kenseth, from a previous relationship. Following in his father's footsteps, Ross began his racing career in legends cars and late models in Wisconsin before competing in ARCA and NASCAR. Kenseth is also a grandfather of two.

Kenseth competed in the 2022 Boston Marathon, finishing 3,576th overall and 141st in the Men's 50-54 division with a time of 3:01:40.

Kenseth established a fan museum in Cambridge in 2004 following his championship season. The museum later relocated to a downtown storefront before closing in 2017.

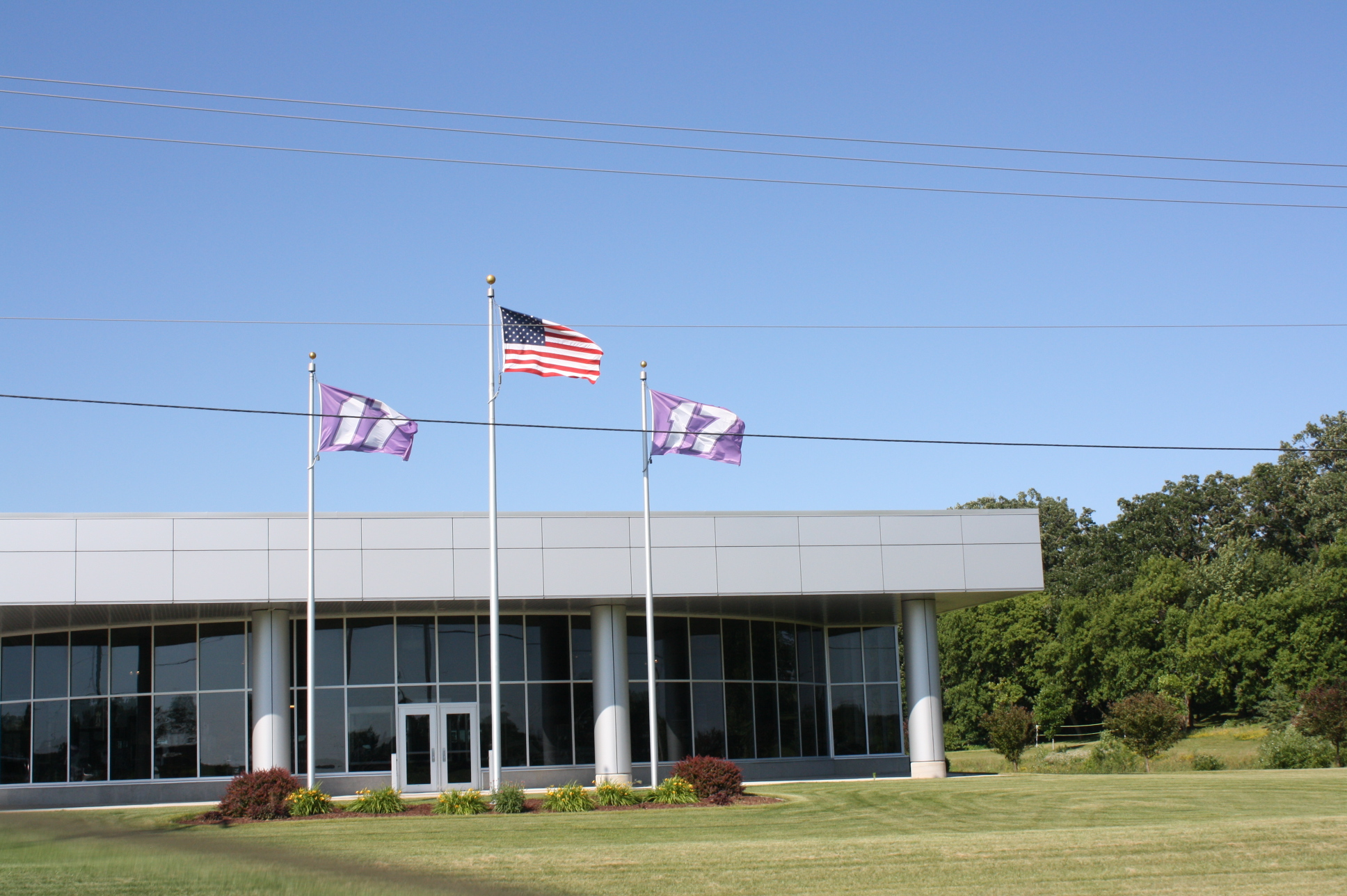
Kenseth's Former Fan Museum

Kenseth is a fan of the metal band Metallica and named his cat after drummer Lars Ulrich. Additionally, he supports the Green Bay Packers.

== Motorsports career results ==
=== NASCAR ===
(key) (Bold – Pole position awarded by qualifying time. Italics – Pole position earned by points standings or practice time. * – Most laps led.)

==== Cup Series ====
NASCAR Cup Series results
Year	Team	No.	Make	1	2	3	4	5	6	7	8	9	10	11	12	13	14	15	16	17	18	19	20	21	22	23	24	25	26	27	28	29	30	31	32	33	34	35	36	NCSC	Pts	Ref
1998	Roush Racing	60	Ford	DAY	CAR	LVS	ATL	DAR	BRI	TEX	MAR	TAL; DNQ	CAL	CLT	DOV	RCH	MCH	POC	SON	NHA	POC	IND	GLN	MCH	BRI	NHA	DAR	RCH												57th	150	
1998	Elliott-Marino Racing	94	Ford																										DOV; 6	MAR	CLT	TAL	DAY	PHO	CAR	ATL				57th	150	
1999	Joe Gibbs Racing	18	Pontiac	DAY	CAR	LVS	ATL	DAR; QL^{†}	TEX	BRI	MAR	TAL	CAL	RCH	CLT	DOV	MCH	POC	SON	DAY	NHA	POC	IND	GLN																49th	434	
1999	Roush Racing	17	Ford																						MCH; 14	BRI	DAR; 37	RCH	NHA	DOV; 4	MAR	CLT; 40	TAL	CAR; 35	PHO	HOM	ATL			49th	434	
2000	Roush Racing	17	Ford	DAY; 10	CAR; 37	LVS; 14	ATL; 40	DAR; 6	BRI; 12	TEX; 31	MAR; 21	TAL; 18	CAL; 3*	RCH; 15	CLT; 1	DOV; 2	MCH; 17	POC; 14	SON; 32	DAY; 20	NHA; 19	POC; 5	IND; 26	GLN; 10	MCH; 8	BRI; 39	DAR; 33	RCH; 32	NHA; 17	DOV; 12	MAR; 34	CLT; 9	TAL; 10	CAR; 25	PHO; 42	HOM; 21	ATL; 9			14th	3711	
2001	Roush Racing	17	Ford	DAY; 21	CAR; 28	LVS; 17	ATL; 37	DAR; 19	BRI; 14	TEX; 20	MAR; 6	TAL; 19	CAL; 17	RCH; 8	CLT; 18	DOV; 16	MCH; 15	POC; 6	SON; 21	DAY; 16	CHI; 7	NHA; 16	POC; 14	IND; 42	GLN; 23	MCH; 4	BRI; 33	DAR; 23	RCH; 35	DOV; 29	KAN; 32	CLT; 12	MAR; 36	TAL; 4	PHO; 4	CAR; 10	HOM; 27	ATL; 17	NHA; 4	13th	3982	
2002	Roush Racing	17	Ford	DAY; 33	CAR; 1*	LVS; 14	ATL; 4	DAR; 8	BRI; 6	TEX; 1	MAR; 2	TAL; 30	CAL; 20	RCH; 6	CLT; 2	**DOV**; 40	POC; 35	MCH; 1	SON; 39	DAY; 30	CHI; 14	NHA; 33	POC; 8	IND; 3	GLN; 33	MCH; 11	BRI; 5	DAR; 37	RCH; 1	NHA; 10	DOV; 4	KAN; 7	TAL; 14	CLT; 34	MAR; 19	ATL; 9	CAR; 8	PHO; 1	HOM; 40	8th	4432	
2003	Roush Racing	17	Ford	DAY; 20	CAR; 3	LVS; 1	ATL; 4	DAR; 8	BRI; 2	TEX; 6	TAL; 9	MAR; 22	CAL; 9	RCH; 7	CLT; 2*	DOV; 7	POC; 3	MCH; 4	SON; 14	DAY; 6	CHI; 12	NHA; 3	POC; 13	IND; 2	GLN; 8	MCH; 9	BRI; 4	DAR; 14	RCH; 7	NHA; 7	DOV; 9	TAL; 33	KAN; 36	CLT; 8	MAR; 13	ATL; 11	PHO; 6	CAR; 4	HOM; 43	1st	5022	
2004	Roush Racing	17	Ford	DAY; 9	CAR; 1*	LVS; 1*	ATL; 6	DAR; 31	BRI; 5	TEX; 16	MAR; 8	TAL; 42	CAL; 4	RCH; 5	CLT; 3	DOV; 22	POC; 21	MCH; 7	SON; 20	DAY; 39	CHI; 12	NHA; 4	POC; 8	IND; 16	GLN; 9	MCH; 8	BRI; 9	CAL; 22	RCH; 28	NHA; 2	DOV; 32	TAL; 14	KAN; 17	CLT; 11	MAR; 16	ATL; 41	PHO; 36	DAR; 20	HOM; 19	8th	6069	
2005	Roush Racing	17	Ford	DAY; 42	CAL; 26	LVS; 8	ATL; 31	BRI; 16	MAR; 11	TEX; 18	PHO; 42	TAL; 11	DAR; 26	RCH; 12	CLT; 37	DOV; 7	POC; 32	MCH; 4	SON; 11	DAY; 9	CHI; 2*	NHA; 10	POC; 36	IND; 5	GLN; 18	MCH; 3	**BRI**; 1*	CAL; 7	RCH; 2	NHA; 3	DOV; 35	TAL; 3	**KAN**; 5	CLT; 26	MAR; 12	ATL; 5	TEX; 3*	PHO; 32	HOM; 3	7th	6352	
2006	Roush Racing	17	Ford	DAY; 15	CAL; 1	LVS; 2*	ATL; 13	BRI; 3	MAR; 24	TEX; 2	PHO; 3	TAL; 6	RCH; 38	DAR; 3	CLT; 5	DOV; 1	POC; 5	MCH; 13	SON; 17	DAY; 5	CHI; 22*	NHA; 14	POC; 14	IND; 2	GLN; 21	MCH; 1*	BRI; 1	CAL; 7	RCH; 8	NHA; 10	DOV; 10*	KAN; 23	TAL; 4	CLT; 14	MAR; 11	ATL; 4	TEX; 12	PHO; 13	HOM; 6	2nd	6419	
2007	Roush Fenway Racing	17	Ford	DAY; 27	CAL; 1*	LVS; 4	ATL; 3	BRI; 11	MAR; 10	TEX; 2	PHO; 5	TAL; 14	RCH; 10	DAR; 7	CLT; 12	DOV; 5	POC; 9	MCH; 42	SON; 34	NHA; 9	DAY; 8	CHI; 2	IND; 10	POC; 14	GLN; 12	MCH; 4	BRI; 39	CAL; 7	RCH; 14	NHA; 7	DOV; 35*	KAN; 35	TAL; 26	CLT; 34	MAR; 5	ATL; 4	TEX; 2	PHO; 3*	HOM; 1*	4th	6298	
2008	Roush Fenway Racing	17	Ford	DAY; 36	CAL; 5	LVS; 20	ATL; 8	BRI; 10	MAR; 30	TEX; 9	PHO; 38	TAL; 41	RCH; 38	DAR; 6	CLT; 7	DOV; 4	POC; 7	MCH; 3	SON; 8	NHA; 18	DAY; 3	CHI; 7	IND; 38	POC; 11	GLN; 12	MCH; 5	BRI; 9	CAL; 5	RCH; 39	NHA; 40	DOV; 2*	KAN; 5	TAL; 26	CLT; 41	MAR; 8	ATL; 4*	TEX; 9	PHO; 15	HOM; 25	11th	6184	
2009	Roush Fenway Racing	17	Ford	DAY; 1	CAL; 1*	LVS; 43	ATL; 12	BRI; 33	MAR; 23	TEX; 5	PHO; 27	TAL; 17	RCH; 13	**DAR**; 10	CLT; 10	DOV; 4	POC; 16	MCH; 20	SON; 18	NHA; 22	DAY; 8	CHI; 23	IND; 10	POC; 11	GLN; 14	MCH; 14	BRI; 10	ATL; 12	RCH; 25	NHA; 23	DOV; 3	KAN; 39	CAL; 13	CLT; 2	MAR; 14	TAL; 24	TEX; 3	PHO; 18	HOM; 13	14th	4389	
2010	Roush Fenway Racing	17	Ford	DAY; 8	CAL; 7	LVS; 5	ATL; 2	BRI; 5	MAR; 18	PHO; 6	TEX; 20	TAL; 28	RCH; 13	DAR; 13	DOV; 3	CLT; 10	POC; 17	MCH; 14	SON; 30	NHA; 17	DAY; 15	CHI; 13	IND; 12	POC; 18	GLN; 13	MCH; 5	BRI; 10	ATL; 11	RCH; 14	NHA; 23	DOV; 18	KAN; 7	CAL; 30	CLT; 6	MAR; 15	TAL; 16	TEX; 2	PHO; 7	HOM; 9	5th	6294	
2011	Roush Fenway Racing	17	Ford	DAY; 34	PHO; 12	**LVS**; 11	BRI; 4	CAL; 4	MAR; 6	TEX; 1*	TAL; 36	RCH; 21	DAR; 25	DOV; 1	CLT; 14*	KAN; 6	POC; 8	MCH; 2	SON; 14	DAY; 2	KEN; 6	NHA; 20	IND; 5	POC; 16	GLN; 14	MCH; 10	BRI; 6	ATL; 9	RCH; 23	**CHI**; 21	NHA; 6	DOV; 5	KAN; 4	CLT; 1	TAL; 18	MAR; 31	TEX; 4	**PHO**; 34	HOM; 4	4th	2330	
2012	Roush Fenway Racing	17	Ford	DAY; 1	PHO; 13	LVS; 22	BRI; 2	CAL; 16	MAR; 4	TEX; 5	KAN; 4	RCH; 11	TAL; 3*	DAR; 6	CLT; 10	DOV; 3	POC; 7	MCH; 3	SON; 13	KEN; 7	**DAY**; 3*	NHA; 13	IND; 35	POC; 23	GLN; 8	MCH; 17	BRI; 25	ATL; 9	RCH; 5	CHI; 18	NHA; 13	DOV; 35	TAL; 1	CLT; 14	KAN; 1*	MAR; 14	TEX; 4	PHO; 14	HOM; 18	7th	2324	
2013	Joe Gibbs Racing	20	Toyota	DAY; 37*	PHO; 7	LVS; 1	BRI; 35	CAL; 7	MAR; 14	TEX; 12	**KAN**; 1*	**RCH**; 7*	TAL; 8*	DAR; 1	CLT; 15	DOV; 40	POC; 25	MCH; 6	SON; 19	KEN; 1	DAY; 33	NHA; 9	IND; 5	POC; 22	GLN; 23	MCH; 15	BRI; 1*	ATL; 12	RCH; 6	CHI; 1*	NHA; 1*	DOV; 7	KAN; 11	CLT; 3	TAL; 20	MAR; 2*	TEX; 4	PHO; 23	**HOM**; 2*	2nd	2400	
2014	Joe Gibbs Racing	20	Toyota	DAY; 6	PHO; 12	LVS; 10	BRI; 13*	**CAL**; 4	MAR; 6	TEX; 7	DAR; 4	RCH; 5	TAL; 37	KAN; 10	CLT; 3	DOV; 3	POC; 25	MCH; 14	SON; 42	KEN; 4	DAY; 20	NHA; 4	IND; 4	POC; 38	GLN; 9	MCH; 38	BRI; 3	ATL; 2	RCH; 41	CHI; 10	NHA; 21	DOV; 5	KAN; 13	CLT; 19	TAL; 2	MAR; 6	**TEX**; 25	PHO; 3	HOM; 6	7th	2334	
2015	Joe Gibbs Racing	20	Toyota	DAY; 35	ATL; 5	LVS; 9	PHO; 16	CAL; 31	MAR; 4	TEX; 23	**BRI**; 1	RCH; 7	TAL; 25	KAN; 6	**CLT**; 4	DOV; 39	POC; 6	MCH; 4	SON; 21	DAY; 23	KEN; 5	NHA; 6	IND; 7	POC; 1	GLN; 4	**MCH**; 1*	BRI; 42	DAR; 21	RCH; 1*	CHI; 5	NHA; 1	DOV; 7	**CLT**; 42	KAN; 14*	TAL; 26	MAR; 38	TEX	PHO	HOM; 7	15th	2234	
2016	Joe Gibbs Racing	20	Toyota	DAY; 14	ATL; 19	LVS; 37	PHO; 7	CAL; 19	MAR; 15	TEX; 11	BRI; 36	RCH; 7	TAL; 23	KAN; 4	DOV; 1	CLT; 7	POC; 7	MCH; 14	SON; 20	DAY; 28	KEN; 8	NHA; 1	IND; 2	POC; 17	GLN; 10	BRI; 37	MCH; 13	DAR; 6	RCH; 38	CHI; 9	NHA; 2	DOV; 5	CLT; 2	**KAN**; 9*	TAL; 28	MAR; 4*	TEX; 7	PHO; 21	HOM; 7	5th	2330	
2017	Joe Gibbs Racing	20	Toyota	DAY; 40	ATL; 3	LVS; 9	PHO; 37	CAL; 36	MAR; 9	TEX; 16	BRI; 4	**RCH**; 23*	TAL; 24	KAN; 12	CLT; 4	DOV; 12	POC; 10	MCH; 11	SON; 20	DAY; 27	KEN; 17	NHA; 4	IND; 5	POC; 9	GLN; 2	MCH; 24	BRI; 4	DAR; 6	**RCH**; 38	CHI; 9	NHA; 3	DOV; 11	CLT; 11	TAL; 14	KAN; 37	MAR; 9	TEX; 4	PHO; 1	HOM; 8	7th	2344	
2018	Roush Fenway Racing	6	Ford	DAY	ATL	LVS	PHO	CAL	MAR	TEX	BRI	RCH	TAL	DOV	KAN; 36	CLT; 17	POC; 13	MCH; 33	SON	CHI	DAY	KEN; 19	NHA; 15	POC; 18	GLN; 29	MCH	BRI	DAR; 25	IND; 12	LVS	RCH; 25	ROV	DOV; 20	TAL	KAN	MAR; 23	TEX	PHO; 7	HOM; 6	32nd	268	
2020	Chip Ganassi Racing	42	Chevy	DAY	LVS	CAL	PHO	DAR; 10	DAR; 30	CLT; 26	CLT; 23	BRI; 16	ATL; 15	MAR; 23	HOM; 25	TAL; 40	POC; 11	POC; 12	IND; 2	KEN; 25	TEX; 18	KAN; 17	NHA; 37	MCH; 17	MCH; 15	DRC; 26	DOV; 23	DOV; 15	DAY; 28	DAR; 14	RCH; 16	BRI; 14	LVS; 18	TAL; 16	ROV; 34	KAN; 40	TEX; 39	MAR; 14	PHO; 25	28th	521	
^{†} – Qualified and relieved for Bobby Labonte during the race

===== Daytona 500 =====
Year	Team	Manufacturer	Start	Finish
2000	Roush Racing	Ford	24	10
2001	Roush Racing	Ford	16	21
2002	Roush Racing	Ford	40	33
2003	Roush Racing	Ford	35	20
2004	Roush Racing	Ford	21	9
2005	Roush Racing	Ford	14	42
2006	Roush Racing	Ford	11	15
2007	Roush Fenway Racing	Ford	10	27
2008	Roush Fenway Racing	Ford	28	36
2009	Roush Fenway Racing	Ford	39	**1**
2010	Roush Fenway Racing	Ford	24	8
2011	Roush Fenway Racing	Ford	9	34
2012	Roush Fenway Racing	Ford	4	**1**
2013	Joe Gibbs Racing	Toyota	12	37*
2014	Joe Gibbs Racing	Toyota	3	6
2015	Joe Gibbs Racing	Toyota	35	35
2016	Joe Gibbs Racing	Toyota	2	14
2017	Joe Gibbs Racing	Toyota	9	40

==== Xfinity Series ====
NASCAR Xfinity Series results
Year	Team	No.	Make	1	2	3	4	5	6	7	8	9	10	11	12	13	14	15	16	17	18	19	20	21	22	23	24	25	26	27	28	29	30	31	32	33	34	35	NXSC	Pts	Ref
1996	Wegner Racing	55	Chevy	DAY	CAR	RCH	ATL	NSV	DAR	BRI	HCY	NZH	CLT; 31	DOV	SBO	MYB	GLN	MLW	NHA	TAL	IRP	MCH	BRI	DAR	RCH	DOV	CLT	CAR	HOM										93rd	70	
1997	Reiser Enterprises	17	Chevy	DAY	CAR	RCH	ATL	LVS	DAR	HCY	TEX	BRI	NSV; 11	TAL; 7	NHA; 40	NZH; 34	CLT; 22	DOV; 11	SBO; 6	GLN; 36	MLW; 12	MYB; 17	GTW; 27	IRP; 6	MCH; 8	BRI; 20	DAR; 12	RCH; 22	DOV; 3	CLT; 12	CAL; 3	CAR; 32	HOM; 6						22nd	2426	
1998	Reiser Enterprises	17	Chevy	DAY; 6	CAR; 1	LVS; 24	NSV; 33	DAR; 4	BRI; 3	TEX; 8	HCY; 5	TAL; 8	NHA; 16	NZH; 4	CLT; 5	DOV; 40	RCH; 3	**PPR**; 1	GLN; 17	MLW; 5	MYB; 8	CAL; 3	SBO; 12	IRP; 6	MCH; 3	BRI; 34	DAR; 6	RCH; 4	DOV; 1*	CLT; 2	GTW; 2	CAR; 27	ATL; 4	HOM; 4					2nd	4421	
1999	Reiser Enterprises	17	Chevy	DAY; 4	CAR; 3*	LVS; 30	ATL; 25	DAR; 1*	TEX; 18*	NSV; 15	BRI; 35	TAL; 4	CAL; 1	NHA; 8	RCH; 3	NZH; 1	CLT; 3	DOV; 32	SBO; 6	GLN; 16	MLW; 5	MYB; 3	PPR; 7	GTW; 6	IRP; 4	MCH; 22	BRI; 1*	DAR; 3	RCH; 20	**DOV**; 38*	**CLT**; 7*	CAR; 4	MEM; 21	PHO; 8	HOM; 38				3rd	4327	
2000	Reiser Enterprises	17	Chevy	DAY; 1	CAR; 9	LVS; 5	**ATL**; 2	DAR; 2	BRI; 27	TEX; 2	NSV	TAL; 21	CAL; 1	RCH; 2	NHA	CLT; 30	DOV; 3	SBO	MYB	GLN	MLW	NZH	PPR	GTW	IRP	MCH; 8	BRI; DNQ	DAR; 8	RCH; 8	DOV; 1*	**CLT**; 1	CAR; 7	MEM	PHO; 6	HOM; 8				17th	3022	
2001	Reiser Enterprises	17	Chevy	DAY; 3	CAR	**LVS**; 34	ATL; 30	DAR; 2*	BRI; 1	**TEX**; 5	NSH	TAL; 21	CAL; 20	**RCH**; 4	NHA	NZH	CLT; 2	DOV; 2	KEN	MLW; 2	GLN	CHI; 30	GTW	PPR	IRP	MCH; 12	BRI; 30	DAR; 7	RCH; 2	DOV; 10	KAN; 4	CLT; 16*	MEM	PHO; 22	CAR; 2	HOM; 5			18th	3167	
2002	Reiser Enterprises	17	Ford	DAY; 3	CAR	LVS; 39	DAR	BRI; 43	TEX; 9	NSH	TAL	CAL	RCH	NHA	NZH	CLT	DOV	NSH	KEN	MLW	DAY	CHI	GTW	PPR	IRP	MCH	BRI	DAR	RCH	DOV	KAN	CLT	MEM	ATL	CAR	PHO	HOM		77th	245	
2003	Reiser Enterprises	17	Ford	DAY; 2	CAR	LVS; 42	DAR	BRI	TEX; 7	TAL	NSH	CAL; 1	RCH	GTW	NZH	CLT; 1	DOV; 4*	NSH	KEN	MLW	DAY	CHI; 2	NHA; 3	PPR	IRP	MCH; 18	BRI; 25	DAR	RCH; 6*	DOV	KAN	CLT; QL^{†}	MEM	ATL; 2*	PHO; 19	CAR	HOM; 38		24th	1925	
2004	Reiser Enterprises	17	Ford	DAY; 5	CAR				TEX; 1	NSH	TAL	CAL; 4*	GTW	RCH	NZH	CLT	DOV; 35	NSH	KEN	MLW	DAY	CHI; 16	NHA; 1	PPR	IRP	MCH; 42	BRI; 2	CAL; 12	RCH	DOV		CLT; 2	MEM	ATL; 1*	PHO; 8		HOM; 6		25th	2253	
2004	Roush Racing	9	Ford			LVS; 6*	DAR	BRI																							KAN; 33					DAR; 5			25th	2253	
2005	Roush Racing	17	Ford	DAY; DNQ	CAL; 9	MXC	LVS	ATL; 4	NSH	BRI; 4	TEX; 7	PHO	TAL	DAR; 1*	RCH; 8	CLT	DOV; DNQ	NSH	KEN	MLW	DAY	CHI; 8	NHA; 9	PPR	GTW	IRP	GLN	MCH	BRI	CAL	RCH; 3	DOV; 38	KAN; 7				PHO; 3	HOM; 36	24th	2049	
2005	Roush Racing	9	Ford																															CLT; 25	MEM	TEX; 6			24th	2049	
2006	Roush Racing	17	Ford	DAY	CAL; 6	MXC	**LVS**; 2	ATL; 4	BRI; 3	TEX; 5	NSH	PHO; 7	TAL	RCH; 3	DAR; 2*	**CLT**; 38*	DOV; 26	NSH	KEN	MLW	DAY	CHI; 5	NHA	MAR	GTW	IRP	GLN	MCH; 4	BRI; 1	CAL; 7	RCH; 3	DOV; 2	**KAN**; 2*	CLT; 4	MEM	TEX; 26	**PHO**; 1*	HOM; 1*	18th	3221	
2007	Roush Fenway Racing	17	Ford	DAY; 12	CAL; 1*	MXC	LVS; 40	ATL; 9	BRI; 2	NSH	TEX; 1	PHO; 2	TAL	RCH; 2	DAR; 37	**CLT**; 7	DOV; 5	NSH	KEN	MLW	NHA; 3	DAY	CHI; 2	GTW	IRP	CGV	GLN; 6	MCH; 2	BRI; 34	CAL; 28	RCH; 4	DOV; 3	**KAN**; 2*	CLT; 31	MEM	TEX; 5	PHO; 2	HOM; 3	10th	3451	
2008	Roush Fenway Racing	17	Ford	DAY; 5	CAL	LVS	ATL; 1	BRI	NSH	TEX	PHO	MXC	TAL	RCH; 12	DAR; 28	CLT	DOV	NSH	KEN	MLW	NHA	DAY	CHI; 17	GTW	IRP	CGV	GLN; 3	MCH	BRI	CAL	RCH	DOV	KAN; 5	CLT	MEM	TEX	PHO	HOM	49th	993	
2009	Roush Fenway Racing	17	Ford	DAY; 10	CAL	LVS																																	22nd	1992	
2009	Roush Fenway Racing	16	Ford				BRI; 4	TEX; 6	NSH	PHO	TAL; 35	**RCH**; 3	DAR; 1	CLT	DOV	NSH	KEN	MLW	NHA	DAY; 14	CHI	GTW	IRP; 3	IOW	GLN	MCH	BRI; 5	CGV	ATL	RCH	DOV; 11	KAN	CAL	CLT; 33	MEM; 11	**TEX**; 4	PHO; 7	HOM; 10	22nd	1992	
2010	Roush Fenway Racing	16	Ford	DAY	CAL	LVS	BRI	NSH	PHO	TEX	TAL	RCH; 10	DAR; 30	DOV	CLT	NSH	KEN	ROA	NHA	DAY	CHI	GTW	IRP	IOW	GLN	MCH	BRI	CGV	ATL; 5	RCH	DOV	KAN	CAL	CLT	GTW	TEX	PHO	HOM	81st	362	
2011	Roush Fenway Racing	16	Ford	DAY	PHO	LVS	BRI	CAL	TEX	TAL	NSH	RCH	DAR	DOV	IOW	CLT; 1	CHI	MCH	ROA	DAY	KEN	NHA	NSH	IRP	IOW	GLN	CGV	BRI	ATL	RCH	CHI	DOV	KAN	CLT	TEX	PHO	HOM		96th	0^{1}	
2013	Joe Gibbs Racing	18	Toyota	DAY; 16	PHO; 8	LVS	BRI	CAL	TEX; 6	RCH	TAL	DAR; 5	CLT; 8	DOV; 3	IOW	MCH	ROA	KEN	DAY; 1	NHA; 9	CHI	IND; 7	IOW	GLN	MOH	BRI	ATL	RCH; 35	CHI; 7	KEN	DOV	KAN; 1	CLT; 5	TEX; 4	PHO; 6	HOM; 4			89th	0^{1}	
2014	Joe Gibbs Racing	20	Toyota	DAY; 14	PHO; 5	LVS; 6	BRI; 5	CAL; 7	TEX; 6	DAR; 3	RCH	TAL	IOW	CLT; 6	DOV; 4	MCH	ROA	KEN; 36	DAY	NHA; 3	CHI	IND; 3	IOW	GLN; 5	MOH	BRI	ATL; 11	RCH; 12	CHI	KEN	DOV	KAN; 6	CLT; 3	TEX; 5	PHO	HOM; 1			82nd	0^{1}	
2015	Joe Gibbs Racing	20	Toyota	DAY	ATL; 8	LVS	PHO; 2	CAL	TEX	BRI	RCH	TAL	IOW	CLT	DOV; 2	MCH	CHI	DAY	KEN	NHA	IND	IOW	GLN	MOH	BRI	ROA	DAR	RCH	CHI; 2	KEN	DOV	CLT	**KAN**; 2*	TEX	PHO	HOM			89th	0^{1}	
^{†} – Qualified for Jeff Burton

^{*} Season still in progress
^{1} Ineligible for series points

=== 24 Hours of Daytona ===
(key)

24 Hours of Daytona results
Year	Class	No	Team	Car	Co-drivers	Laps	Position	Class Pos.	Ref
2005	DP	49	(United States) Multimatic Motorsports	Ford Multimatic DP	(Canada) Scott Maxwell (United States) Kurt Busch (United States) Greg Biffle	588	27 ^{DNF}	15 ^{DNF}	

=== International Race of Champions ===
(key) (Bold – Pole position. * – Most laps led.)

International Race of Champions results
Year	Make	1	2	3	4	Pos.	Points	Ref
2004	Pontiac	DAY; 3	TEX; 12	RCH; 1*	ATL; 1	1st	72	
2005	Pontiac	DAY; 4*	TEX; 9	RCH; 3	ATL; 3	3rd	55	
2006	Pontiac	DAY; 1*	TEX; 5	DAY; 10	ATL; 2	2nd	65	

=== Superstar Racing Experience ===
(key) * – Most laps led. ^{1} – Heat 1 winner. ^{2} – Heat 2 winner.

Superstar Racing Experience results
Year	No.	1	2	3	4	5	6	SRXC	Pts
2022	5	FIF	SBO	STA	NSV; 3	I55; 12	SHA; 3	10th	61
2023	8	STA	STA II	MMS	BER	ELD; 5	LOS	15th	0^{1}

== See also ==
- List of all-time NASCAR Cup Series winners
- List of Daytona 500 winners
- List of NASCAR Sprint All-Star Race drivers
- List of NASCAR Sprint Cup Series champions
- List of people from Wisconsin

Sporting positions
Preceded by Tony Stewart	NASCAR Winston Cup Champion; 2003	Succeeded by Kurt Busch
Preceded by Kurt Busch	IROC Champion; IROC XXVIII (2004)	Succeeded by Mark Martin
Achievements
Preceded by Ryan Newman; Trevor Bayne	Daytona 500 Winner; 2009; 2012	Succeeded by Jamie McMurray; Jimmie Johnson
Preceded by Jeff Burton	Coca-Cola 600 Winner; 2000	Succeeded by Jeff Burton
Preceded by Jimmie Johnson	Southern 500 winner 2013	Succeeded by Kevin Harvick
Preceded by Jimmie Johnson	NASCAR All-Star Race Winner; 2004	Succeeded by Mark Martin
Preceded by Denny Hamlin	Sprint Unlimited Winner; 2015	Succeeded by Denny Hamlin
Awards
Preceded by Tony Stewart	NASCAR Winston Cup Rookie of the Year; 2000	Succeeded by Kevin Harvick
