= 2015 Sprint Unlimited =

2015 Sprint Unlimited at Daytona
Race details
- Race 1 of 2 exhibition races in the 2015 NASCAR Sprint Cup Series
- Date: February 14, 2015
- Location: Daytona International Speedway, Daytona Beach, Florida, United States
- Course: Permanent racing facility
- Course length: 2.5 miles (4 km)
- Distance: 75 laps, 187.5 mi (301.8 km)
- Weather: Clear night sky with a temperature of 51 °F (11 °C); wind out of the WSW at 10 mph (16 km/h)
- Average speed: 135.569 mph (218.177 km/h)

Pole position
Driver	Paul Menard	Richard Childress Racing
- Time: Random draw

Most laps led
Driver	Martin Truex Jr.	Furniture Row Racing
- Laps: 30

Winner
No. 20	Matt Kenseth	Joe Gibbs Racing

Television in the United States
- Network: Fox & MRN
- Announcers: Mike Joy, Michael Waltrip and Larry McReynolds
- Nielsen ratings: 3.2/6 (Final); 3.2/6 (Overnight); 5.6 million viewers

Radio in the United States
- Radio: MRN
- Booth announcers: Joe Moore, Jeff Striegle and A. J. Allmendinger
- Turn announcers: Dave Moody (1 & 2), Mike Bagley (Backstretch) and Kyle Rickey (3 & 4)

The 2015 Sprint Unlimited at Daytona was a NASCAR Sprint Cup Series stock car race held on February 14, 2015, at Daytona International Speedway in Daytona Beach, Florida. Contested over 75 laps it was the first exhibition race of the 2015 NASCAR Sprint Cup Series season. Matt Kenseth took the victory ahead of Martin Truex Jr., Carl Edwards, Casey Mears, and Kyle Larson, who rounded out the top five.

== Report ==
=== Background ===
Daytona International Speedway, the race track where the race was held.

The track, Daytona International Speedway, is one of six superspeedways to hold NASCAR races, the others being Michigan International Speedway, Auto Club Speedway, Indianapolis Motor Speedway, Pocono Raceway and Talladega Superspeedway. The standard track at Daytona International Speedway is a four-turn superspeedway that is 2.5 miles (4.0 km) long. The track's turns are banked at 31 degrees, while the front stretch, the location of the finish line, is banked at 18 degrees. Denny Hamlin was the defending race winner.

=== Format and eligibility ===
The race is 75 laps in length, and was divided into two segments; the first was 25 laps and the second was 50 laps. The race was open to those drivers who won a pole in the 2014 season or had won the Sprint Unlimited previously. Two new changes were announced in December. The field was expanded to those who have won the pole for the Daytona 500 previously and/or were in the Chase in 2014.

=== Entry list ===
The entry list for the Sprint Unlimited was released on December 17, 2014. Twenty-five drivers were eligible for the race.

No.	Driver	Team	Manufacturer
1	Jamie McMurray (P)	Chip Ganassi Racing	Chevrolet
2	Brad Keselowski (P)	Team Penske	Ford
3	Austin Dillon (P)	Richard Childress Racing	Chevrolet
4	Kevin Harvick (P)	Stewart–Haas Racing	Chevrolet
5	Kasey Kahne (C)	Hendrick Motorsports	Chevrolet
10	Danica Patrick (D)	Stewart–Haas Racing	Chevrolet
11	Denny Hamlin (P)	Joe Gibbs Racing	Toyota
13	Casey Mears*	Germain Racing	Chevrolet
14	Tony Stewart (P)	Stewart–Haas Racing	Chevrolet
15	Clint Bowyer*	Michael Waltrip Racing	Toyota
16	Greg Biffle (D)	Roush Fenway Racing	Ford
17	Ricky Stenhouse Jr.*	Roush Fenway Racing	Ford
18	Kyle Busch (P)	Joe Gibbs Racing	Toyota
19	Carl Edwards (D)	Joe Gibbs Racing	Toyota
20	Matt Kenseth (P)	Joe Gibbs Racing	Toyota
22	Joey Logano (P)	Team Penske	Ford
24	Jeff Gordon (P)	Hendrick Motorsports	Chevrolet
27	Paul Menard*	Richard Childress Racing	Chevrolet
31	Ryan Newman (C)	Richard Childress Racing	Chevrolet
41	Kurt Busch (W)	Stewart–Haas Racing	Chevrolet
42	Kyle Larson (P)	Chip Ganassi Racing	Chevrolet
43	Aric Almirola (C)	Richard Petty Motorsports	Ford
48	Jimmie Johnson (P)	Hendrick Motorsports	Chevrolet
78	Martin Truex Jr. (D)	Furniture Row Racing	Chevrolet
88	Dale Earnhardt Jr. (W)	Hendrick Motorsports	Chevrolet
Official entry list

Key	Meaning
(P)	Eligible as a pole winner in 2014
(W)	Eligible as a past winner of the race
(D)	Eligible as a past Daytona 500 pole winner
(C)	Eligible for being in the Chase in 2014
*	Took the place of a driver that withdrew

== Starting lineup ==
The starting lineup was determined by a random draw. Paul Menard drew the top spot.

Pos	No.	Driver	Team	Manufacturer
1	27	Paul Menard	Richard Childress Racing	Chevrolet
2	5	Kasey Kahne	Hendrick Motorsports	Chevrolet
3	22	Joey Logano	Team Penske	Ford
4	2	Brad Keselowski	Team Penske	Ford
5	18	Kyle Busch	Joe Gibbs Racing	Toyota
6	3	Austin Dillon	Richard Childress Racing	Chevrolet
7	16	Greg Biffle	Roush Fenway Racing	Ford
8	4	Kevin Harvick	Stewart–Haas Racing	Chevrolet
9	11	Denny Hamlin	Joe Gibbs Racing	Toyota
10	78	Martin Truex Jr.	Furniture Row Racing	Chevrolet
11	24	Jeff Gordon	Hendrick Motorsports	Chevrolet
12	31	Ryan Newman	Richard Childress Racing	Chevrolet
13	41	Kurt Busch	Stewart–Haas Racing	Chevrolet
14	19	Carl Edwards	Joe Gibbs Racing	Toyota
15	10	Danica Patrick	Stewart–Haas Racing	Chevrolet
16	20	Matt Kenseth	Joe Gibbs Racing	Toyota
17	48	Jimmie Johnson	Hendrick Motorsports	Chevrolet
18	15	Clint Bowyer	Michael Waltrip Racing	Toyota
19	43	Aric Almirola	Richard Petty Motorsports	Ford
20	17	Ricky Stenhouse Jr.	Roush Fenway Racing	Ford
21	1	Jamie McMurray	Chip Ganassi Racing	Chevrolet
22	14	Tony Stewart	Stewart–Haas Racing	Chevrolet
23	13	Casey Mears	Germain Racing	Chevrolet
24	88	Dale Earnhardt Jr.	Hendrick Motorsports	Chevrolet
25	42	Kyle Larson	Chip Ganassi Racing	Chevrolet

== Practice ==
=== First practice ===
Kurt Busch was the fastest in the first practice session with a time of 44.832 and a speed of 200.749 mph (323.074 km/h). Tony Stewart was called to the NASCAR hauler for ignoring the black flag which was shown to him, as he did not weigh in before the session. Per NASCAR regulations, all drivers had to weigh in before the start of the season to calculate the minimum car weights. This was normally done during January Preseason Thunder, but it was canceled in 2015. Stewart took to Twitter to express his frustration upon exiting his car.

Pos	No.	Driver	Team	Manufacturer	Time	Speed
1	41	Kurt Busch	Stewart–Haas Racing	Chevrolet	44.832	200.749
2	17	Ricky Stenhouse Jr.	Roush Fenway Racing	Ford	45.052	199.769
3	4	Kevin Harvick	Stewart–Haas Racing	Chevrolet	45.209	199.075
Official first practice results

=== Final practice ===
Jeff Gordon was the fastest in the final practice session with a time of 45.740 and a speed of 196.764 mph (316.661 km/h).

Pos	No.	Driver	Team	Manufacturer	Time	Speed
1	24	Jeff Gordon	Hendrick Motorsports	Chevrolet	45.740	196.764
2	11	Denny Hamlin	Joe Gibbs Racing	Toyota	45.796	196.524
3	18	Kyle Busch	Joe Gibbs Racing	Toyota	45.871	196.202
Official final practice results

== Race ==
=== First segment ===
The race started at 8:35 p.m. Eastern time with Paul Menard leading the field to the green. With a push from Matt Kenseth on the inside lane, Brad Keselowski took the lead on lap nine. Kenseth jumped to the outside lane to pass Keselowski for the lead on lap eleven, before Martin Truex Jr. utilized a slingshot move to pass Kenseth for the lead the next lap. Kenseth used a push on the bottom to retake the lead on lap 15 but could not maintain the lead as he fell back and handed Truex Jr. the lead. The first caution of the race flew on lap 22 for a single car wreck on the front stretch. Coming to the start-finish line, Kyle Larson made contact with Brad Keselowski, while trying to merge into the top lane of cars. When Keselowski tried to correct it, he destroyed his car's splitter when it dug into the grass. He turned back onto the track and hit the wall. Austin Dillon rear-ended Kyle Busch trying to avoid Keselowski.

=== Second segment ===
==== The Big One ====
As the caution came out three laps before the scheduled end of the first segment, NASCAR counted this caution as the competition caution. Upon exiting his car, Keselowski told reporters that he had made contact with Larson and teammate Joey Logano and that he "couldn't tell if someone made contact with me from behind". Keselowski also described the crash as "just part of racing at Daytona" and that his team would "be ready to go when it counts in the [Daytona] 500". Jamie McMurray earned the dubious honor of being the first driver penalized under NASCAR's new pit road monitoring system, as his pit crew was found to be over the wall too soon. Ryan Newman was also penalized for driving through too many pit boxes before reaching his own. The race restarted on lap 30, with Dale Earnhardt Jr. at the head of the race. Truex Jr. ducked underneath Earnhardt Jr. to take back the lead on lap 41, before the second caution of the race flew on lap 45 for The Big One, involving twelve cars. Greg Biffle got into the back of Jamie McMurray enough to turn him; McMurray overcorrected and turned back onto the tri-oval. Aric Almirola, Clint Bowyer, Kurt Busch, Kyle Busch, defending race winner Denny Hamlin, Kevin Harvick, Jimmie Johnson, Kasey Kahne, McMurray, Paul Menard, Ricky Stenhouse Jr. and Tony Stewart were all taken out or sustained damage in the crash. McMurray stated that Biffle has "got me loose a couple of times before" but that it was customary for Daytona racing, adding that "you're fighting for every position every lap and he just got into me a little too hard off four and I couldn't hang on to it". Bowyer – having been involved in the crash after his car was hit by Menard – told reporters that he saw a car backwards and became involved in the wreck. Bowyer added that the cars "don't seem to like to go through the grass very well" and that he was "just starting to have some fun and get up through them". This necessitated the race being red flagged for almost 15 minutes; teams were allowed to work on their cars, as the Sprint Unlimited was a non-points race.

==== Final laps ====
The race restarted with 27 laps to go. Kenseth dive bombed around Truex to take back the lead with 19 laps to go, before the third caution of the race flew with 14 laps to go after Stenhouse Jr. spun out in turn 3 and took out three other cars with him. The race restarted with nine laps to go, before the fourth caution of the race flew with seven laps to go after Stewart got loose exiting turn 2 and collected Biffle, who hit the inside retaining wall in a manner similar to Danica Patrick in the 2012 Gatorade Duels. Kurt Busch was also taken out in this wreck. The red flag was displayed a second time; after a five-minute delay, Kenseth held off the field until the end of the race, to win ahead of Truex Jr. and Carl Edwards. Only 12 of the race's 25 starters were running at the finish of the event. Kenseth described his victory as "great to win at Daytona anytime" and "a great way to start off the year". Truex Jr. stated that his runner-up finish was the "most fun I have had in a race car in a long, long time".

=== Post-race ===
Following the race, Kevin Harvick confronted Joey Logano on pit road after Logano pushed him into the wall with two laps to go. One of Logano's crew members pulled him away from Harvick to prevent the argument from escalating. Harvick stated that "you can't just drive somebody straight in the corner into the fence" and that Logano "kind of did the same thing to me at Talladega". Logano referred to Harvick as "an instigator" and that the incident was "the same old crap". Danica Patrick also seemed to be upset with Logano after the race, but he did not understand why.

=== Race results ===
Pos	No.	Driver	Team	Manufacturer	Laps
1	20	Matt Kenseth	Joe Gibbs Racing	Toyota	75
2	78	Martin Truex Jr.	Furniture Row Racing	Chevrolet	75
3	19	Carl Edwards	Joe Gibbs Racing	Toyota	75
4	13	Casey Mears	Germain Racing	Chevrolet	75
5	42	Kyle Larson	Chip Ganassi Racing	Chevrolet	75
6	22	Joey Logano	Team Penske	Ford	75
7	24	Jeff Gordon	Hendrick Motorsports	Chevrolet	75
8	18	Kyle Busch	Joe Gibbs Racing	Toyota	75
9	88	Dale Earnhardt Jr.	Hendrick Motorsports	Chevrolet	75
10	10	Danica Patrick	Stewart–Haas Racing	Chevrolet	75
11	4	Kevin Harvick	Stewart–Haas Racing	Chevrolet	75
12	31	Ryan Newman	Richard Childress Racing	Chevrolet	75
13	14	Tony Stewart	Stewart–Haas Racing	Chevrolet	67
14	16	Greg Biffle	Roush Fenway Racing	Ford	67
15	41	Kurt Busch	Stewart–Haas Racing	Chevrolet	67
16	17	Ricky Stenhouse Jr.	Roush Fenway Racing	Ford	61
17	3	Austin Dillon	Richard Childress Racing	Chevrolet	61
18	43	Aric Almirola	Richard Petty Motorsports	Ford	55
19	11	Denny Hamlin	Joe Gibbs Racing	Toyota	45
20	15	Clint Bowyer	Michael Waltrip Racing	Toyota	45
21	27	Paul Menard	Richard Childress Racing	Chevrolet	45
22	48	Jimmie Johnson	Hendrick Motorsports	Chevrolet	45
23	5	Kasey Kahne	Hendrick Motorsports	Chevrolet	45
24	1	Jamie McMurray	Chip Ganassi Racing	Chevrolet	45
25	2	Brad Keselowski	Team Penske	Ford	22

== Media ==
=== Television ===
Fox
Booth announcers	Pit reporters
Lap-by-lap: Mike Joy; Color-commentator: Larry McReynolds; Color commentator: Darrell Waltrip	Matt Yocum; Jamie Little; Chris Neville

=== Radio ===
MRN Radio
Booth announcers	Turn announcers	Pit reporters
Lead announcer: Joe Moore; Announcer: Jeff Striegle; Color Commentator: A. J. Allmendinger	Turns 1 & 2: Dave Moody; Backstretch: Mike Bagley; Turns 3 & 4: Kyle Rickey	Winston Kelley; Steve Post; Alex Hayden

== See also ==
- 2015 Budweiser Duels, held on February 19
- 2015 Daytona 500, held on February 22
