= Ryan Newman (racing driver) =

American racing driver (born 1977)

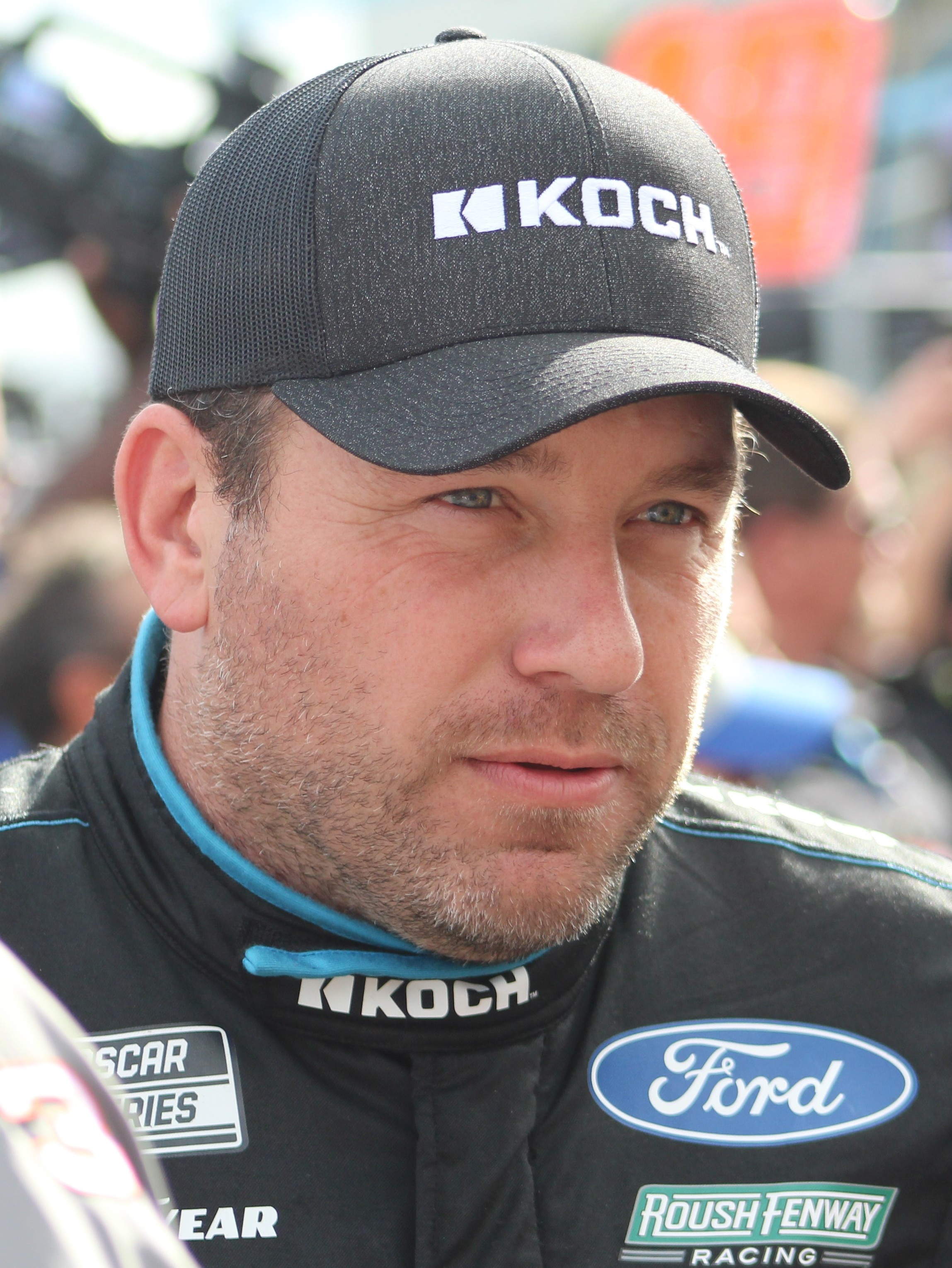
- Newman at Daytona International Speedway in 2020
- Born: Ryan Joseph Newman; December 8, 1977 (age 48); South Bend, Indiana, U.S.
- Achievements: 2008 Daytona 500 winner 1999 USAC Silver Crown Series Champion; 2013 Brickyard 400 winner 2002 The Winston Winner; 1997, 1999 Night Before the 500 Winner; 2014 Whelen Modified Tour All-Star Shootout Winner; 2023 SRX Series Champion
- Awards: 2002 NASCAR Winston Cup Series Rookie of the Year; 2003 Driver of the Year; Named one of NASCAR's 75 Greatest Drivers (2023)

NASCAR Cup Series career
- 733 races run over 23 years
- 2023 position: 55th
- Best finish: 2nd (2014)
- First race: 2000 Checker Auto Parts/Dura Lube 500k (Phoenix)
- Last race: 2023 NASCAR Cup Series Championship Race (Phoenix)
- First win: 2002 New Hampshire 300 (New Hampshire)
- Last win: 2017 Camping World 500 (Phoenix)
Wins	Top tens	Poles
18	268	51

NASCAR O'Reilly Auto Parts Series career
- 65 races run over 10 years
- 2023 position: 72nd
- Best finish: 28th (2001)
- First race: 2001 Alltel 200 (Rockingham)
- Last race: 2023 Contender Boats 300 (Homestead)
- First win: 2001 NAPAonline.com 250 (Michigan)
- Last win: 2005 Ford 300 (Homestead)
Wins	Top tens	Poles
7	35	12

NASCAR FedEx Freight Truck Series career
- 8 races run over 7 years
- 2026 position: 78th
- Best finish: 49th (2009)
- First race: 2008 E-Z-GO 200 (Atlanta)
- Last race: 2026 FaithFest 250 (North Wilkesboro)
- First win: 2008 E-Z-GO 200 (Atlanta)
Wins	Top tens	Poles
1	6	1

ARCA Menards Series career
- 8 races run over 3 years
- Best finish: 32nd (2000)
- First race: 1997 Gateway ARCA 125 (Gateway)
- Last race: 2001 BPU 200 (Kansas)
- First win: 2000 Pepsi ARCA 200 (Pocono)
- Last win: 2001 Discount Auto Parts 200 (Daytona)
Wins	Top tens	Poles
4	5	3
- Statistics up to date as of November 6, 2026.

Ryan Joseph Newman (born December 8, 1977), nicknamed "Rocket Man", is an American professional stock car racing driver that competed in the NASCAR Cup Series from 2000 to 2023. He claimed 18 official wins including the 2008 Daytona 500 and 2013 Brickyard 400, as well as 117 top-fives, 51 pole positions, and a non-points win at the 2002 Winston. Newman was runner-up in 2014, and ranked sixth in 2002, 2003, and 2005. Newman currently competes in the SMART Modified Tour for Coulter Motorsports.

== Early career ==
Newman made his racing debut in 1993 in the United Midget Auto Racing Association and the All-American Midget Series, winning both Rookie of the Year and the championship. His one hundred feature wins and two titles have him in the Quarter Midget Hall of Fame. Moving to USAC in 1995, running the C.E. Lewis No. 39 Drinan Chassis powered Brayton Motor, he was ROTY again in both the Midget Series and the Silver Crown in 1996. In 1999, he was the first driver to win in all three divisions while being the Silver Bullet Series champion in the No. 14 Beast Chassis powered Chevy.

== NASCAR career ==
=== Cup Series ===
==== Penske Racing (2000–2008) ====
Newman began driving for icon Roger Penske in 2000, in order to transition to stock car racing. Newman ran the No. 27 Alltel-sponsored Ford for Penske Racing in the ARCA RE/MAX Series. Newman won three of the five ARCA races he entered, and made his Winston Cup debut at Phoenix International Raceway in the No. 02 Alltel-sponsored Ford for Penske. In 2001, Penske planned for Newman to run at least 23 combined events in both ARCA and NASCAR while Newman attended Purdue University. In addition to five ARCA events, Newman ran fifteen Busch Series races that season, winning poles in his second and third career starts and scoring his first career win at Michigan International Speedway in just his ninth career start. He also had a series-high six poles. Around this time, he would meet racing legend Buddy Baker, who would eventually become his mentor on superspeedways.

In 2002, Newman won a season-high six poles, breaking the rookie record previously set by Davey Allison. Newman joined Dale Earnhardt Jr. as the second rookie to win The Winston all-star race. At Watkins Glen later that summer, Newman led eleven laps and finished second behind Tony Stewart. However, the race ended in controversy, as it was discovered that Stewart had restarted the race too early and jumped the restart. Despite a protest by Penske, NASCAR upheld Stewart's win. In September, he scored his first career Winston Cup win at New Hampshire Motor Speedway after starting from the pole. Newman beat out Jimmie Johnson for the Rookie of the Year award on the strength of rookie records in top-fives (fourteen) and top-tens (22), even though Johnson had more wins, finished higher in the points standings, and led the standings at one point.

Newman's sophomore season began with a flip at the 2003 Daytona 500 after contact with Ken Schrader. At Watkins Glen, he spun and hit the foam blocks, sending him on his side. He had a near-flip at the 2003 Aaron's 499, when he blew a tire mid-pack and nearly turned on his side in turn one, sparking a 27-car crash. Newman's 2003 season was pretty inconsistent. He would win one race but wreck in the next. Though finishing the season with a series-high eight wins and eleven poles, along with 17 top-fives and 22 top-tens and an average finish of 13.9, Newman also suffered seven DNFs, which left him sixth in points. His number of poles during the season led to him being nicknamed "Rocket Man".

In 2004, Newman qualified for the inaugural Chase for the Cup by finishing seventh in points with two wins and nine poles. He made the 2005 Chase as well, an addition to returning to the Busch Series after a four-year absence, where he won six out of the nine races he entered, including a series-record five straight.

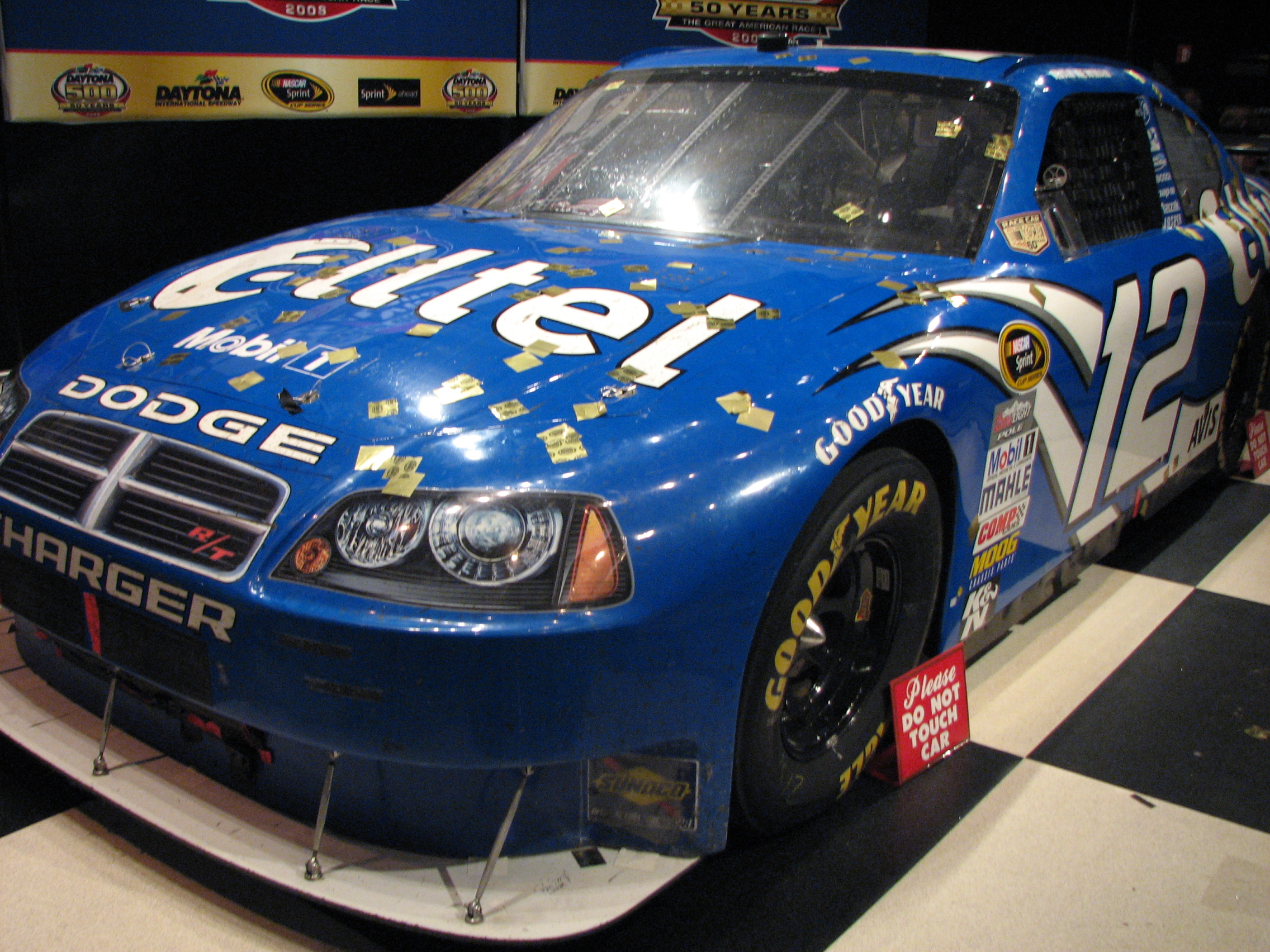
Newman's 2008 Daytona 500 car, on display at the Daytona 500 Experience

Newman endured his first winless season in 2006, finishing a career-worst eighteenth in points, while his longtime crew chief, Matt Borland, left for Michael Waltrip Racing. His pole ratio between his rookie year and 2006 was one in every three races, tying him for fifteenth on the all-time poles list. As of November 2020, Newman has 51 poles, placing him ninth all-time.

In 2007, despite a streak of three consecutive poles, Newman again failed to win a race, including a near win at Lowe's Motor Speedway that was spoiled by a blown tire. His winless drought ended after he won the 2008 Daytona 500 on February 17, 2008. It was also the first Daytona 500 win for Penske. Newman failed to make the Chase from 2006 to 2008. In the points standings, he finished 18th in 2006, thirteenth in 2007, and seventeenth in 2008.

==== Stewart–Haas Racing (2009–2013) ====
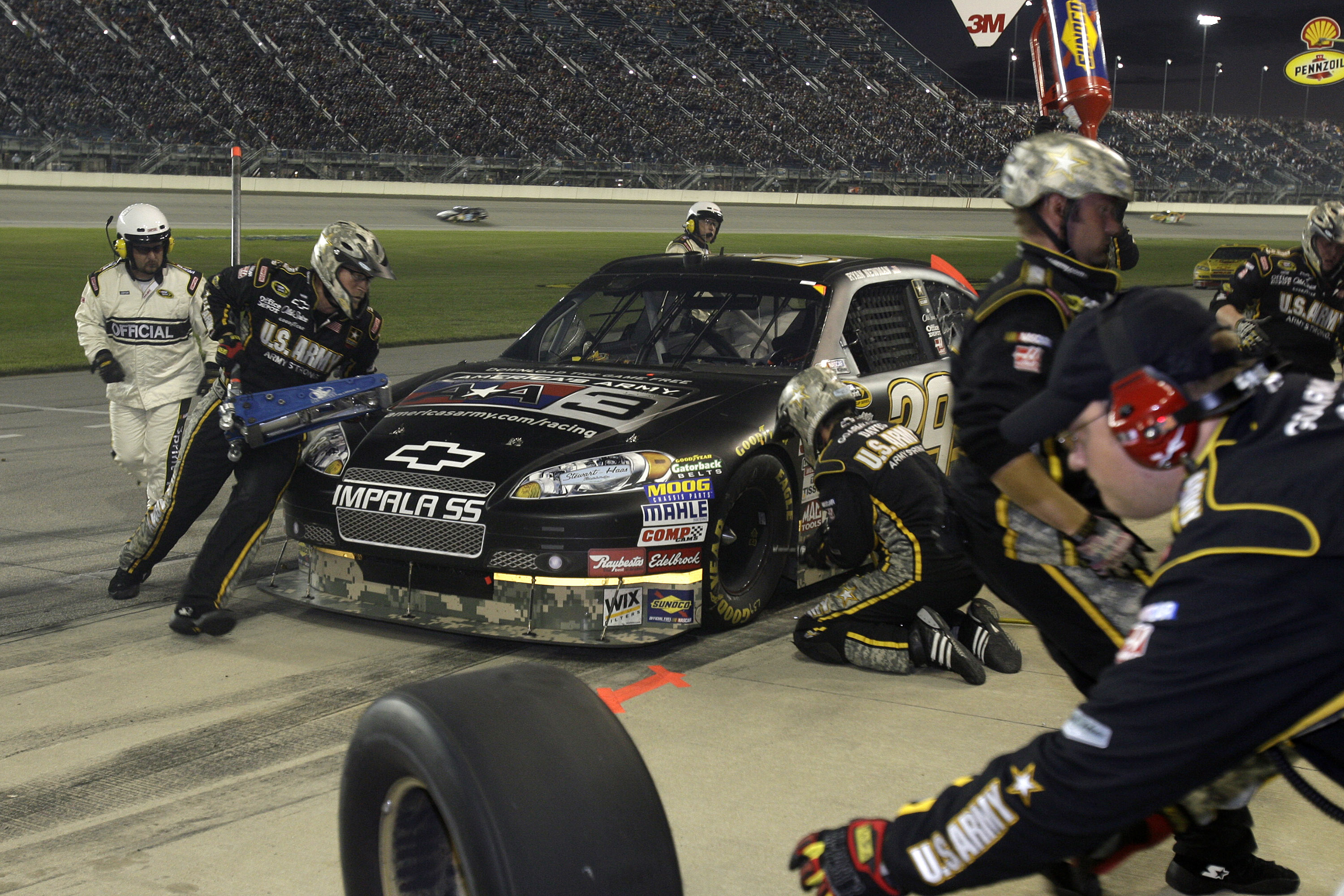
Newman pits his No. 39 Impala

On July 15, 2008, Newman announced that he was leaving Penske at the end of the season, and a month later, it was confirmed he would be joining Haas CNC Racing for 2009, in the No. 4 Chevy Impala, the number was later changed to 39 due to Morgan–McClure Motorsports owning the number. The team was renamed Stewart–Haas Racing before the season.

Despite a slow start, Newman earned a pole, five top-fives, fifteen top-tens, and an average finish of 14.0, his best since his 8-win season in 2003. On September 12 at Richmond, Newman finished tenth and clinched a spot in the Chase for the first time since 2005. On November 1, 2009, at the Amp Energy 500 at Talladega Superspeedway, Newman was involved in a heavy crash on the back stretch in which he flipped over on top of Kevin Harvick entering Turn 3. He ended up on his roof, and because the roof was crushed, crews had to use the Jaws of Life to pry the roof off the car after NASCAR officials flipped it back over. Newman was unharmed.

On April 10, 2010, Newman broke a 78-race winless streak with a win in the Subway Fresh Fit 600 at Phoenix International Raceway. He only led four laps during the race. The win was the first in NASCAR history for a car numbered 39. In September 2010, he was chosen as "honorable mention" in a list of the smartest athletes in sports by Sporting News.

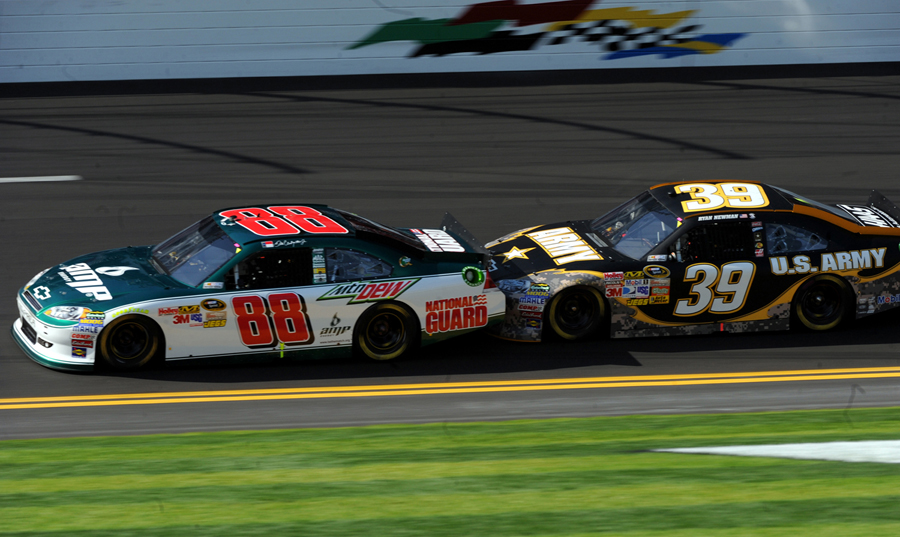
Newman tandem racing with Dale Earnhardt Jr. during the 2011 Gatorade Duels at Daytona

Newman began his 2011 season by leading the most laps in the Daytona 500, but crashed twice late and finished 22nd. He got his first win of the season, winning on fuel mileage, having enough to get the checkered flag at the Lenox Industrial Tools 301 at New Hampshire, giving him his third career win at the track. Tony Stewart finished second, giving Stewart–Haas Racing their first-ever 1–2 finish. At the same track in September, Newman grabbed his 3rd pole of the season at the Sylvania 300. The 49th pole of his career put him in a tie for 10th all-time on career poles with Bobby Isaac.

On April 1, 2012, at Martinsville Speedway, Newman survived a wild finish to get the sixteenth win of his career, driving the No. 39 Outback Steakhouse car. The finish involved a controversial caution with three laps to go involving the No. 10 of David Reutimann, which set up a green-white-checkered finish. Jeff Gordon and Jimmie Johnson dominated the race, but on the restart, they crashed with Clint Bowyer, and Newman came through unscathed en route to the win.

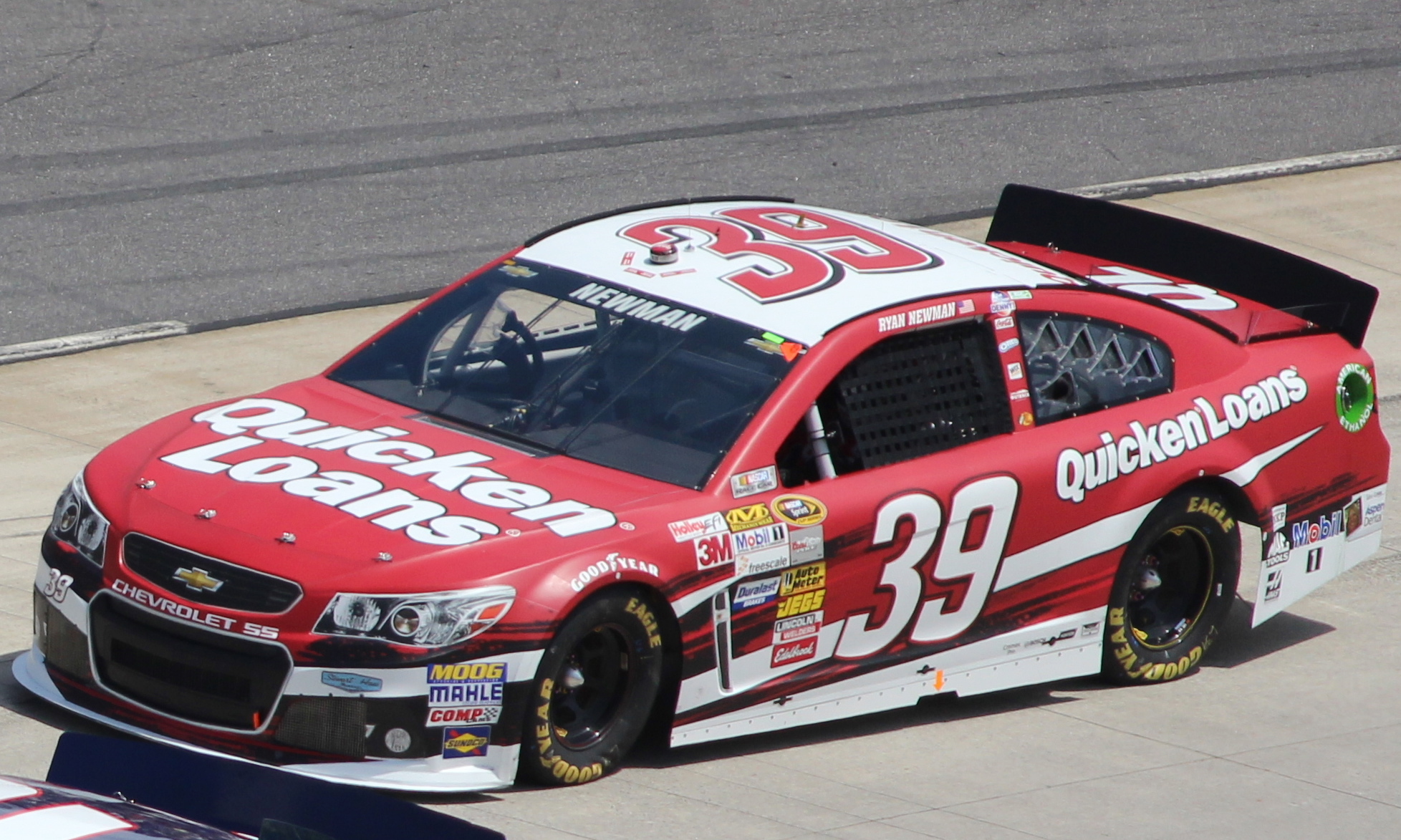
Newman competing in the 2013 STP Gas Booster 500 at Martinsville Speedway

Newman's 2013 campaign started with a fifth-place finish in the Daytona 500, but his momentum changed with two crashes at Phoenix the following week. He finished 38th at Las Vegas, but recovered with a 7th-place finish at Bristol. Newman collected two more Top 10 finishes in the next three races, but during that span, he also had a controversial 31st-place finish in Martinsville. After a puncture, Newman appeared to stop deliberately and was penalized three laps. Two mediocre races at Kansas and Richmond followed before the series went to Talladega. There, Newman was initially running well but finished 32nd when he and his teammate Danica Patrick were caught up in a spectacular late crash that saw Kurt Busch flip over and land on top of Newman. Newman, however, recovered well to collect two consecutive Top 10 finishes at both Darlington and Charlotte, displaying a large performance difference between the All-Star Race and the Coca-Cola 600.

At Dover, Newman was running well until a pit road accident. There, he nearly tapped Jimmie Johnson after locking up his wheels when coming into pit road. He was penalized for a speeding violation resulting from the locked wheels and was one lap down after the penalty. Not long after the penalty, Newman was involved in an accident with David Gilliland, ending his race.

The following week at Pocono Raceway, Newman led nineteen laps and finished fifth after running most of the race on an off-sequence pit stop strategy.

Newman strung together three unimpressive races at Michigan, Kentucky, and Sonoma before finishing tenth at Daytona after a crash at the finish line. This made him, Jimmie Johnson and Dale Earnhardt Jr. the only three drivers to sweep the top-ten at Daytona in 2013 (with only Johnson sweeping the top-five by winning both).

At New Hampshire, Newman finished 39th in the Camping World RV Sales 301 after a crash with Kurt Busch, giving Newman his fifth DNF of 2013. On July 27, Newman won the pole for the Brickyard 400. The race was mainly a duel between Newman and Jimmie Johnson. On the final set of pit stops, Newman capitalized on a mistake by Johnson's pit crew and held on to the lead to win the race. It was Newman's first victory since the 2012 Goody's Fast Relief 500. Newman was leading near the finish of the Richmond race when Clint Bowyer spun with seven laps to go. Newman pitted and ended up falling behind Carl Edwards, Kurt Busch, and Paul Menard on the restart. He got past Menard, but could not catch Busch or Edwards on the last three laps, and lost the tiebreaker for the runner-up Wildcard spot with Martin Truex Jr.

On September 9, 2013, it was announced that Newman would replace Truex in the Chase after an investigation into Bowyer's spin proved that Bowyer had spun himself out intentionally to give Truex an opportunity to hold off Newman for the spot, under which Truex would have clinched a tiebreaker over Newman.

==== Richard Childress Racing (2014–2018) ====
On July 12, 2013, it was announced that Kevin Harvick would be joining Stewart–Haas Racing, driving the No. 4 Chevrolet SS, and that Newman would depart from the team at season's end due to the team having insufficient funding to run a four-car team.

On September 9, 2013, it was announced that Newman would be moving to Richard Childress Racing for the 2014 NASCAR Sprint Cup Series season, replacing Jeff Burton in the No. 31 Chevrolet.

Newman's first highlight of the year was at The Profit on CNBC 500, the Phoenix Spring race. During the event, Newman controlled the race with less than fifty laps to go, battling Kyle Busch for the lead for several laps. An untimely caution came out with less than forty to go. Having not pitted in over sixty laps, Newman and Busch were forced to pit during the caution. As a result, Newman and Busch lost their shot at the win.

Later in the year, Newman was involved in a violent crash at Watkins Glen. On the exit of turn nine, Newman was trailing Greg Biffle when Biffle went wide exiting the corner. Biffle then chopped back across the track onto the racing line, where Newman rear-ended him, resulting in his car impacting a tire wall. Newman then ricocheted back across the track, where he clipped Michael McDowell, sending him into the adjacent Armco barrier on the other side of the track. McDowell violently hit the wall, and his car rolled over. Fortunately, both Newman and McDowell walked away uninjured while the red flag was lifted temporarily to bring the field down the front stretch.

At Michigan in August, Newman questioned a move that Jimmie Johnson pulled on him in the final five laps of the Pure Michigan 400. He and Jimmie exchanged heated words after the race. Newman refused to comment, and when asked what Newman had to say, Johnson replied, "Typical Ryan Newman stuff."

Due to his consistency throughout the season, Newman beat veteran Jeff Gordon for the final wildcard spot in the 2014 Chase for the Sprint Cup. Newman almost won at Talladega when he controlled the final ten laps. However, a final green-white-checkered finish attempt relegated Newman to a fifth-place finish. Although his car failed post-race inspection, NASCAR gave no penalties because of damage received during the Talladega race.

Newman was so consistent that after starting the Chase eleventh in the standings, he moved up each round and was fourth when they came to Phoenix for the next-to-last round of the Chase.

At Phoenix, Newman was in danger of missing the final round. On the final lap, Newman pulled a controversial move on Kyle Larson, forcing Larson to slap the wall. Newman finishing 11th bumped Jeff Gordon out of the Chase. Newman defended his move, stating that while it was unintentional, he felt like he owed Larson one for a previous accident. Larson later agreed with Newman's situation but admitted to having been initially furious over the move.

At Homestead, Newman almost won the Championship, but because he finished second to Kevin Harvick in the race, he finished second to Harvick in the standings. When Newman was interviewed, he stated that he was not going to play dirty and wanted to have a clean race with Harvick. Ryan Newman was in a position to win the race with a two-tire call prior to the final caution. Jeff Gordon's pit, which allowed Harvick to gain one row for the upcoming restart for the championship.

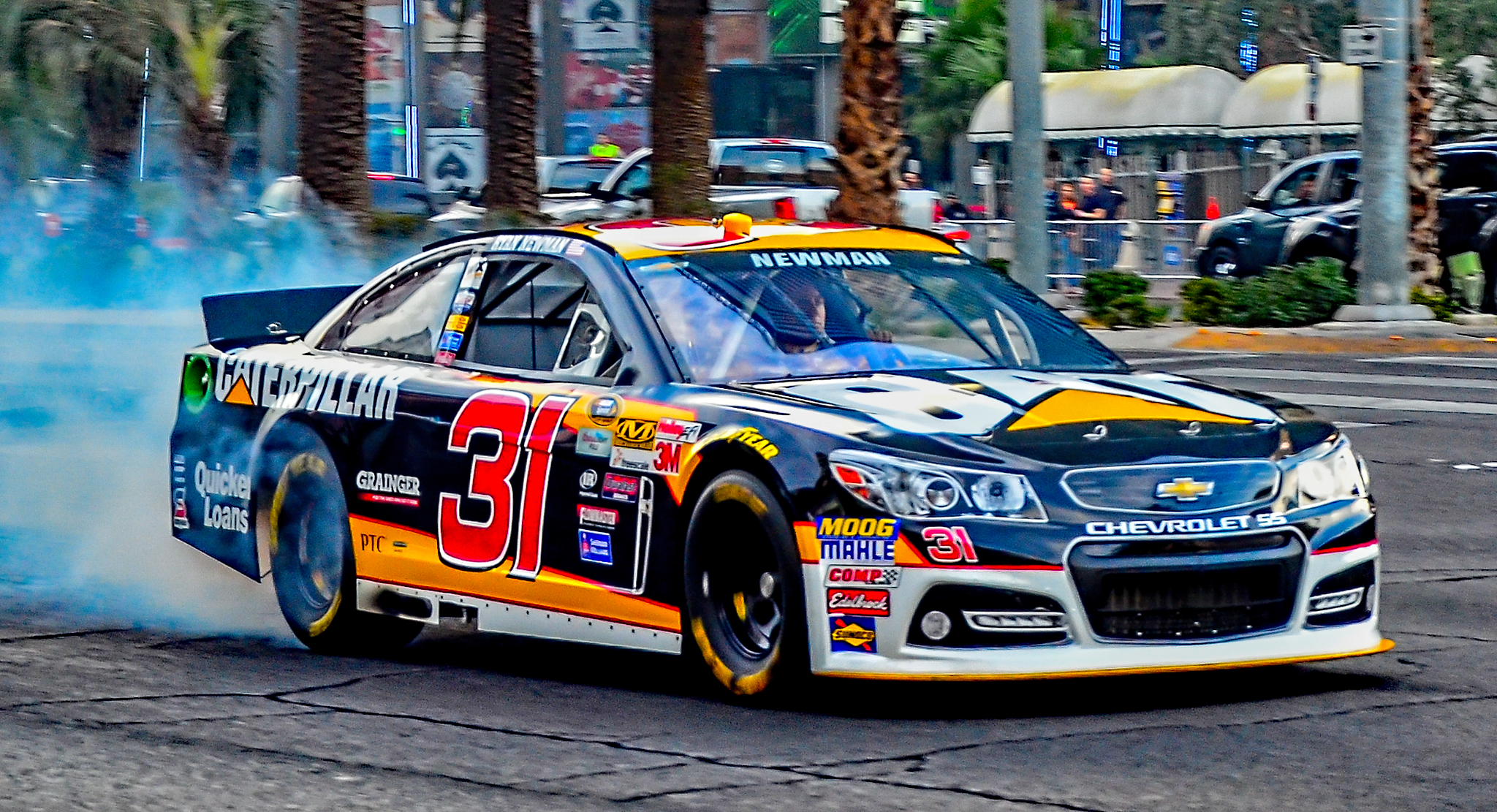
Newman's No. 31 at the 2015 NASCAR Victory Lap on the Las Vegas Strip

Newman announced in January 2015 that he renewed his Richard Childress Racing contract and would drive the No. 31 again for the 2015 NASCAR Sprint Cup series season. Though Newman did not win a pole in 2014, he was listed as being among the drivers allowed in the Sprint Unlimited because NASCAR allowed all Chase drivers to participate in the race.

Newman began his season with a string of Top 10s, including a third-place finish at Las Vegas. While running sixth in the standings in late March, NASCAR confiscated various tires from Newman's team following the 2015 Auto Club 400, suspecting that Newman's team had illegally tampered with the tires. Many teams, including Newman's, were accused of poking holes in the tires to allow air to bleed, which produces more grip for the tires and allows a car to maintain a faster speed. Two weeks later, NASCAR penalized Newman's team with a 75-point deduction, a $125,000 fine, a six-race suspension for crew chief Luke Lambert and two key crew members. Richard Childress Racing announced that it would appeal the penalties. Both appeals were exhausted with the same outcome, when the Final Appeals officer upheld the partially reduced penalties, including the suspensions. The only reason the penalties were partially reduced was because of a gray area in the NASCAR rulebook over whether or not the penalties were post-race inspection penalties.

Newman went on to make the Chase, but was eliminated at the end of round 2. He went on to finish eleventh in the final standings, one point short of the top ten. Jimmie Johnson beat him out for tenth by one point.

On October 10, 2016, Newman signed a multi-year extension with Richard Childress Racing to return in 2017. This extension was rewarded with Newman's and Childress's first victory in four years with his triumph in the Camping World 500 at Phoenix International Raceway. The race was dominated by Kyle Busch, but a late caution caused by Joey Logano blowing a tire with five laps to go set up a final restart. Newman elected to stay out and held off Kyle Larson to claim the win. The win marked Newman's 18th and RCR's 106th Cup victory, ending 127 and 112-race winless streaks, respectively. This was also the first win for the No. 31 car since Jeff Burton won at Charlotte in 2008. Newman was eliminated in the first round after finishing only 2 points behind Ricky Stenhouse Jr.

On September 15, 2018, it was announced that Newman would not return to Richard Childress Racing in 2019. Newman barely missed the playoffs and wound up seventeenth in the final standings, despite also concluding his first full-time season with zero top-five finishes for the first time in his career.

==== Roush Fenway Racing (2019–2021) ====
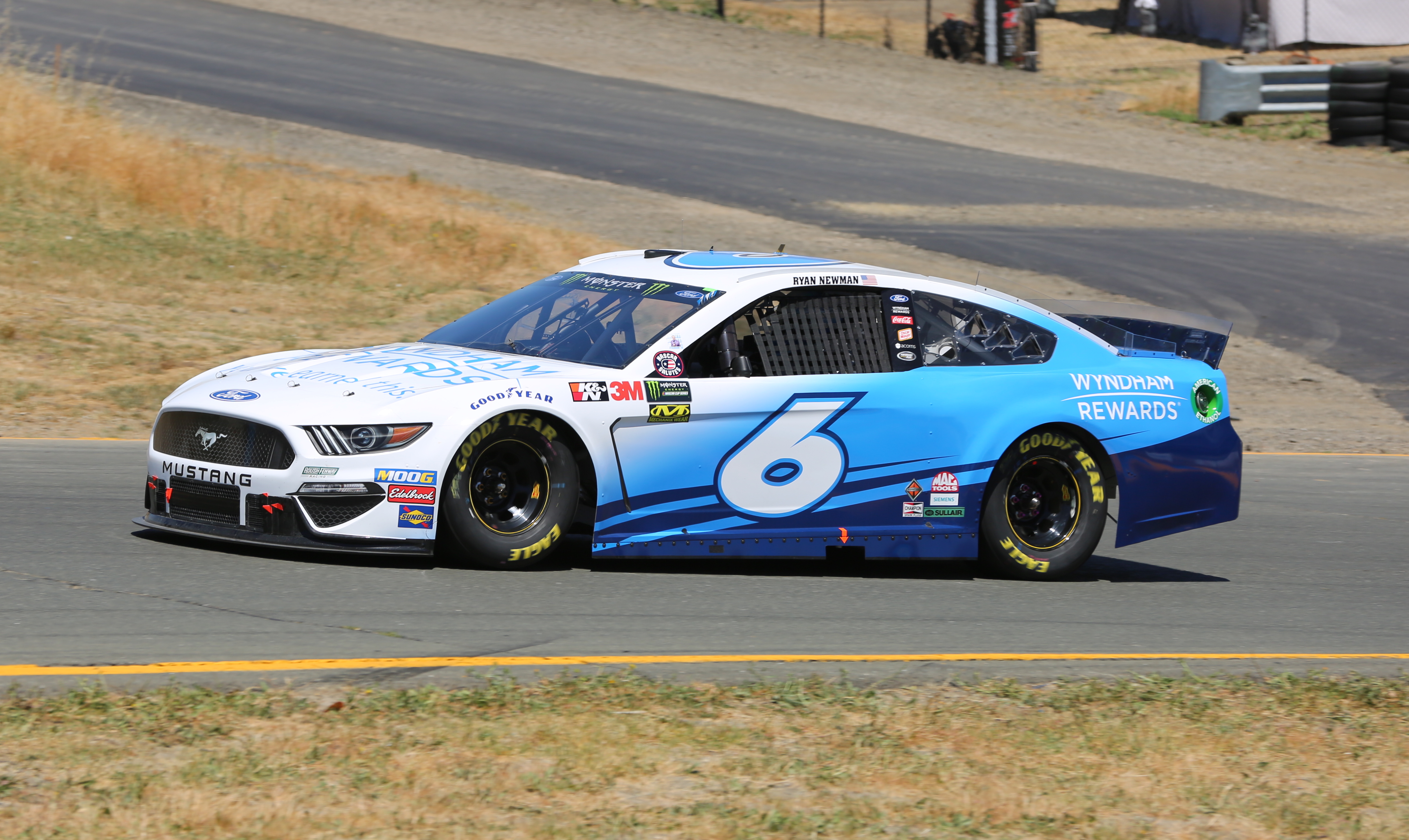
Newman's No. 6 car at Sonoma Raceway in 2019

On September 22, 2018, it was announced that Newman would drive the No. 6 Ford Mustang GT full-time for Roush Fenway Racing starting in 2019. At the conclusion of the 2019 Monster Energy NASCAR All-Star Race, Clint Bowyer chopped Newman's nose, which sent Bowyer into the wall during the cool-down lap. Following the race, Bowyer attacked Newman on pit road. Both drivers were called to the NASCAR hauler, but neither was penalized for the incident. During an autograph session at a Bass Pro Shops store on May 23, a fan brought a pair of boxing gloves for both drivers to sign. Despite not winning a race, Newman stayed consistent enough to make the 2019 playoffs. He was eliminated in the Round of 16 after multiple incidents resulted in him finishing 32nd at the Charlotte Roval. He finished 15th in the final points standings, with his best finish of 2nd coming at Talladega in October after losing the lead to Ryan Blaney in a photo-finish by .007 seconds, the sixth closest finish in NASCAR history.

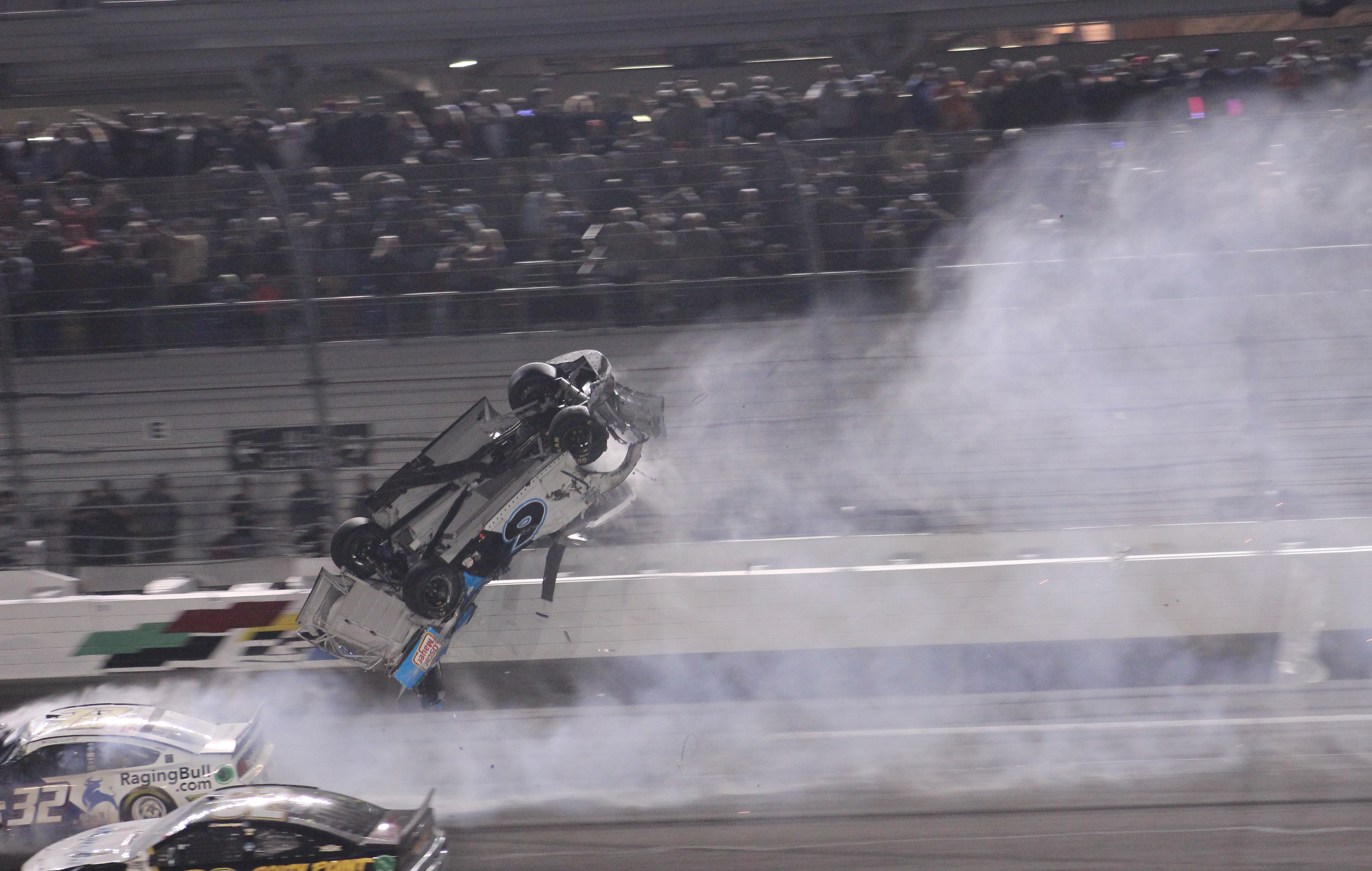
Newman airborne at the 2020 Daytona 500

On February 17, 2020, when leading on the final corner of the final lap of the 2020 Daytona 500, Newman's car was tapped in the rear by Ryan Blaney, who was running second. Newman's car veered across the track and bounced off the outside wall, rolling over onto its roof and turning the driver's side toward Corey LaJoie's onrushing car, which plowed into Newman at nearly 200 MPH. The violent collision caused Newman's car to roll over again, and it slid upside down in a shower of sparks and flames across the finish line in ninth position, coming to a stop hundreds of yards away from the impact. LaJoie's car suffered hood damage and caught fire, but he appeared unhurt. Newman, on the other hand, was unresponsive. The impact with LaJoie was so violent that a giant crack in his helmet could be seen. It took nearly 15 minutes to extract Newman from the wreck and put him in an ambulance before he was taken to Halifax Medical Center. He sustained serious but non life-threatening injuries. Over the next two days, RFR provided updates on Newman's recovery, culminating in his release from the hospital on February 19, walking unaided. Ross Chastain replaced Newman in the No. 6 starting with the Pennzoil 400 at Las Vegas. On February 23, 2020, a statement was released detailing Newman's status, revealing that he suffered no broken bones but was recovering from an unspecified head injury. There was no timetable for Newman's return to resume his seat upon his hospital release, subject to his rehabilitation. Three weeks after the crash, Newman made an appearance at the Phoenix race, stating he believed his survival was a miracle having looked at the state of the wreck afterwards. Newman would later hold an interview with Today on March 11 where he discussed the crash, revealing he was knocked out and sustained a bruised brain. When asked about returning to racing, he stated, "as soon as I possibly can".

Newman announced on April 26, 2020, that he would return to the driver's seat at the restart of NASCAR's 2020 season, as early as May 17, 2020. On April 27, 2020, it was announced that Newman was medically cleared to return to competition. In addition, NASCAR granted him a waiver for eligibility in the 2020 playoffs. However, he failed to make the playoffs after posting only two top-ten finishes, a ninth at the Daytona 500 and a sixth at the YellaWood 500.

Newman would return to Roush Fenway Racing in 2021. On July 20, 2021, RFR announced Brad Keselowski would take over the No. 6 as part of his new minority ownership in the organization, though the team considered retaining Newman in a new part-time car. He finished a career-worst 28th in the final standings. He did not find a ride for 2022 and decided to dirt race instead.

==== Rick Ware Racing (2023) ====
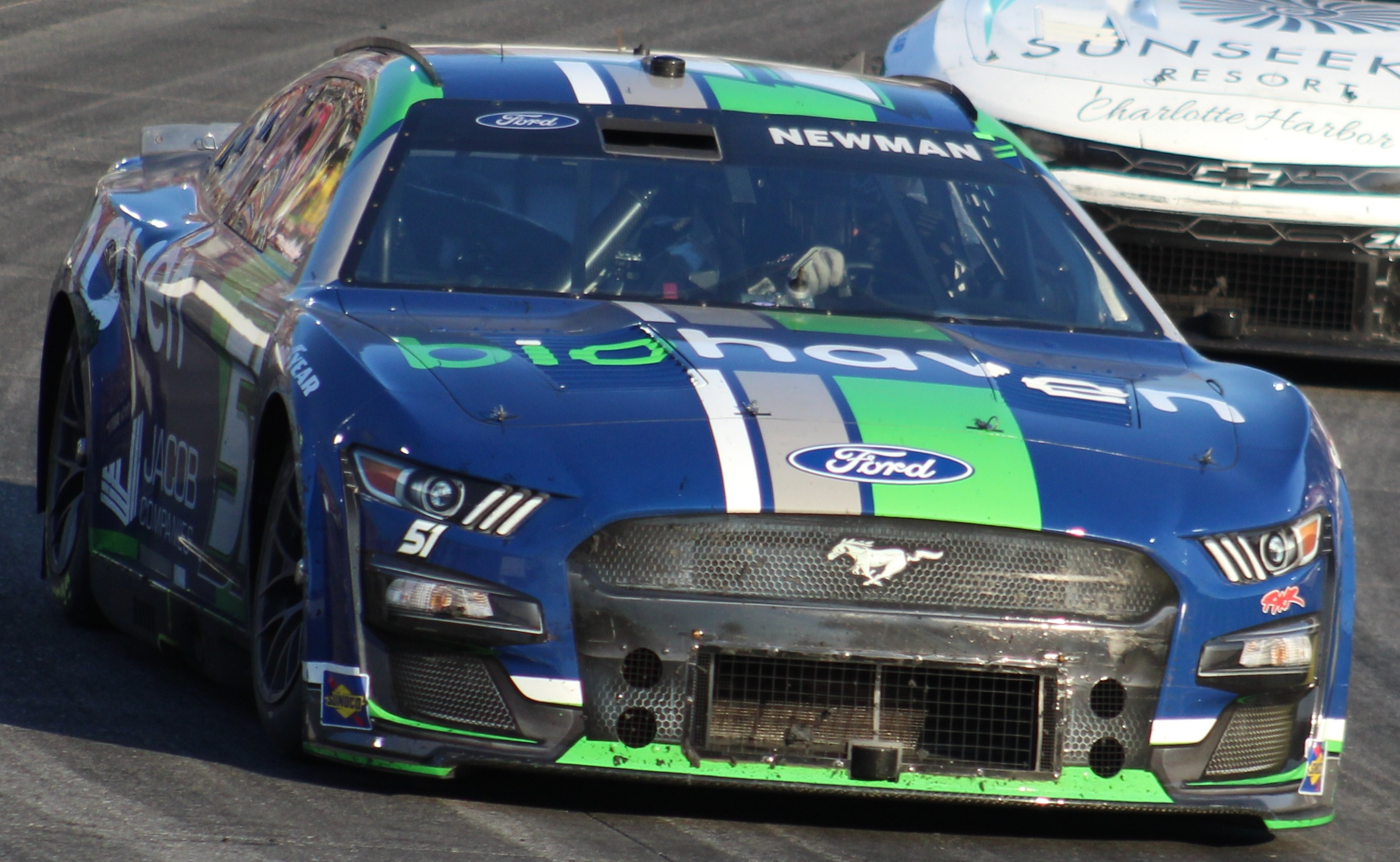
Newman at Martinsville in 2023.

On May 5, 2023, it was announced that Newman would make select starts for Rick Ware Racing in the No. 51 Ford, beginning with Darlington Raceway. Newman made 8 starts for Rick Ware Racing in 2023 with an average finish of 29.9. As of 2025 he has not raced since.

=== Xfinity Series ===
Newman made his Busch Series debut on February 24, 2001, at Rockingham in the Alltel 200. He started second and finished ninth; it was his first of fifteen appearances in the 2001 season, where he finished with one win and eight top-ten finishes.

He joined Dale Earnhardt Jr.'s JR Motorsports for the 2009 campaign as the driver of the No. 5 Chevy, signing on for four appearances for the year. In May 2010, Newman was hired to drive the No. 1 car for Phoenix Racing at Dover. In 2011, Newman drove the No. 30 Chevrolet for Turner Motorsports at Phoenix International Raceway.

On October 5, 2023, it was announced that Newman would run the Xfinity race at Homestead-Miami Speedway for MBM Motorsports' No. 66 Ford.

=== Craftsman Truck Series ===
Newman made his Truck Series debut on October 25, 2008, at Atlanta Motor Speedway, starting tenth in the 33 truck field driving Kevin Harvick's No. 2 Truck and passed his teammate Ron Hornaday Jr. with less than five laps to go to pick up his first truck series win in his first start making him the first driver to get their first Truck win at Atlanta and becoming the fourth driver to win in their first Truck race and joining the list of drivers who have won in all three of NASCAR's top series.

Newman made his Truck Series return on July 24, 2013, at the inaugural Mudsummer Classic at Eldora Speedway, and finished third.

In 2015, Newman made his return to the Truck Series at Kansas, replacing Joe Nemechek to drive the No. 8 Chevrolet Silverado where he finished second.

On July 10, 2018, Jordan Anderson Racing announced that Newman would drive the No. 3 Chevrolet at Eldora. He would qualify tenth, but would fall four laps down, finishing in 30th.

On March 17, 2021, Newman revealed that he would be returning to the Truck Series and entering the new Bristol dirt race with a new team in the series, DCC Racing, owned by Brad Means. This team used the No. 39, Newman's number when he drove for Team Penske in the Xfinity Series, and Stewart–Haas Racing in the Cup Series, driving a Ford, the manufacturer Newman drives in the Cup Series with Roush Fenway Racing. Brad Means is the son of Jimmy Means, the team owner of Xfinity Series team Jimmy Means Racing. However, he failed to qualify when the heat races were canceled due to rain, his first ever DNQ in NASCAR.

=== Whelen Modified Tour ===
On April 1, 2022, Newman returned to the NASCAR Whelen Modified Tour, driving the SS Racing No. 39 at the 2022 Virginia is for Racing Lovers 150 at Richmond Raceway. He led a few laps early in the race, but faded to a thirteenth-place finish.

==== Major crashes ====
Newman has been involved in a number of severe crashes during his career, the worst being at the 2020 Daytona 500 where he was hospitalized. Newman also flipped at Daytona in 2003 and Talladega in 2009. He flipped onto his side two other times in 2003, at Talladega to spark a 27-car accident, and during practice at Watkins Glen. Newman also had airborne cars land on top of his car at Talladega in 2009, 2013, 2016, and Kansas in 2018.

== Post-NASCAR career ==
Newman joined the SRX Series for the 2022 season. He finished second in the drivers' championship with a win at Stafford. In 2023, he won the championship after winning the second Stafford race.

Since 2024, Newman has competed in the SMART Modified Tour for Coulter Motorsports. His first win came in 2025 at Orange County Speedway.

== Personal life ==
Newman was born December 8, 1977, in South Bend, Indiana. He graduated from Purdue University in 2001 with a B.S. in engineering. He has a sister, Jamie. Newman was married to Krissie, and they have two daughters. Newman's car was featured on the cover of the 2005 EA Sports computer game NASCAR SimRacing, and he was actively involved in its development.

Newman was on an episode of American Pickers, buying bumper cars for his children.

On February 13, 2020, Newman announced that he and his wife, Krissie, would "amicably separate." The couple added that they will remain friends, raise their daughters together, and continue to run Rescue Ranch.

=== Charity ===
Newman and his ex-wife, Krissie, operate Rescue Ranch, whose mission is to promote, through its education, respect for all animals, as well as agricultural, environmental, and wildlife conservation; and facilitates rehabilitation, rescue, and responsible pet ownership in order to enhance the human-animal bond. The Newmans themselves have rescued and cared for five dogs: Socks, Dunkin, Fred, Jasmine, and Hollow. They are also the proud owners of an orange feline whom they named Benjamin Ries-Roncalli after the famous ex-driver. He helped fund the construction of the Catawba County, North Carolina Humane Society shelter, in the county where he once lived.

=== Hobbies ===
Newman is a car enthusiast and owns 14 cars. He enjoys driving and working on vintage cars, particularly 1950s Chryslers. His first car was a 74 Triumph TR-6. His favorite car is his 1948 Buick Roadmaster convertible he received from his ex-wife as a birthday gift. His collection can be viewed on the History Channel show American Pickers (Episode: "Art of the Deal").

Newman also enjoys fishing when he finds time during race weekends.

== Awards and honors ==
On April 29, 2008, the St. Joseph County, Indiana, Board of Commissioners dedicated a half-mile stretch of newly rerouted Lincoln Way West (formerly U.S. Route 20) near the South Bend Regional Airport to Newman.

== Motorsports career results ==
=== NASCAR ===
(key) (Bold – Pole position awarded by qualifying time. Italics – Pole position earned by points standings or practice time. * – Most laps led.)

==== Cup Series ====
NASCAR Cup Series results
Year	Team	No.	Make	1	2	3	4	5	6	7	8	9	10	11	12	13	14	15	16	17	18	19	20	21	22	23	24	25	26	27	28	29	30	31	32	33	34	35	36	NCSC	Pts	Ref
2000	Kranefuss-Penske Racing	02	Ford	DAY	CAR	LVS	ATL	DAR	BRI	TEX	MAR	TAL	CAL	RCH	CLT	DOV	MCH	POC	SON	DAY	NHA	POC	IND	GLN	MCH	BRI	DAR	RCH	NHA	DOV	MAR	CLT	TAL	CAR	PHO; 41	HOM	ATL			70th	40	
2001	Penske Racing South	02	Ford	DAY	CAR	LVS; 33	ATL	DAR	BRI	TEX	MAR	TAL	CAL	RCH	**CLT**; 43	DOV	MCH; 5	POC	SON	DAY	CHI	NHA	POC	IND; 31	GLN	MCH	BRI	DAR	RCH	DOV	KAN; 2	CLT; 19	MAR	TAL	PHO; 40	CAR	HOM	ATL	NHA	49th	497	
2002	Penske Racing South	12	Ford	DAY; 7	CAR; 14	LVS; 4	ATL; 10	DAR; 5	BRI; 37	TEX; 40	MAR; 41	TAL; 43	**CAL**; 14	RCH; 2	CLT; 41	DOV; 4	POC; 32	MCH; 3	SON; 9	DAY; 27	**CHI**; 5*	NHA; 5	POC; 5	IND; 4	GLN; 2	MCH; 31	BRI; 36	DAR; 2	RCH; 2*	**NHA**; 1*	DOV; 8	KAN; 2	TAL; 7	CLT; 8	**MAR**; 15	ATL; 10	**CAR**; 23	**PHO**; 18	HOM; 6	6th	4593	
2003	Penske Racing South	12	Dodge	DAY; 43	CAR; 14	LVS; 7	**ATL**; 10	DAR; 14	**BRI**; 22	TEX; 1	TAL; 39	MAR; 38	CAL; 42	RCH; 39	**CLT**; 5	**DOV**; 1*	POC; 5	MCH; 41	SON; 5	DAY; 22	CHI; 1	NHA; 4	**POC**; 1*	IND; 11	GLN; 9	MCH; 1	BRI; 6	**DAR**; 23*	RCH; 1	**NHA**; 9	DOV; 1	TAL; 4	KAN; 1	**CLT**; 2	MAR; 5	**ATL**; 29	**PHO**; 3	**CAR**; 5	HOM; 37	6th	4711	
2004	Penske-Jasper Racing	12	Dodge	DAY; 31	**CAR**; 6	LVS; 27	**ATL**; 5	DAR; 3	**BRI**; 7	TEX; 39	MAR; 5	TAL; 11	CAL; 3	RCH; 9	CLT; 35	DOV; 24	POC; 30	MCH; 1	SON; 14	DAY; 12	CHI; 34	**NHA**; 3*	POC; 13	IND; 31	GLN; 26	MCH; 14	BRI; 2	CAL; 5	**RCH**; 20	NHA; 33	DOV; 1*	TAL; 16	KAN; 33	**CLT**; 14	**MAR**; 3	**ATL**; 17	**PHO**; 2	DAR; 34	HOM; 30	7th	6180	
2005	Penske-Jasper Racing	12	Dodge	DAY; 20	CAL; 9	**LVS**; 9	**ATL**; 14	BRI; 30	MAR; 4	**TEX**; 16	PHO; 14	TAL; 39	DAR; 5	RCH; 3	**CLT**; 5	DOV; 8	POC; 34	**MCH**; 15	SON; 9	DAY; 14	CHI; 29	NHA; 7	POC; 5	IND; 34	GLN; 30	MCH; 12	BRI; 39	CAL; 18	RCH; 12	NHA; 1	**DOV**; 5	TAL; 4	KAN; 23	CLT; 7	MAR; 10	**ATL**; 23	**TEX**; 25	PHO; 12	HOM; 7	6th	6359	
2006	Penske Racing South	12	Dodge	DAY; 3	CAL; 20	LVS; 43	ATL; 18	BRI; 9	MAR; 18	TEX; 40	PHO; 39	TAL; 33	RCH; 8	DAR; 6	CLT; 35	**DOV**; 14	POC; 11	MCH; 15	SON; 2	DAY; 11	CHI; 36	**NHA**; 39	POC; 18	IND; 13	GLN; 8	MCH; 25	BRI; 8	CAL; 33	RCH; 20	NHA; 12	DOV; 24	KAN; 24	TAL; 13	CLT; 27	MAR; 13	ATL; 30	TEX; 34	PHO; 15	HOM; 23	18th	3748	
2007	Penske Racing South	12	Dodge	DAY; 38	CAL; 12	LVS; 8	**ATL**; 23	BRI; 39	MAR; 14	TEX; 32	PHO; 38	TAL; 9	RCH; 6	DAR; 4	**CLT**; 39	**DOV**; 2	**POC**; 2	MCH; 37	SON; 20	NHA; 10	DAY; 14	CHI; 8	IND; 42	POC; 7	GLN; 13	MCH; 16	BRI; 7	CAL; 39	RCH; 11	NHA; 9	DOV; 28	KAN; 43	TAL; 5	**CLT**; 28	MAR; 2	ATL; 37	TEX; 5	PHO; 5	HOM; 18	13th	4046	
2008	Penske Racing South	12	Dodge	DAY; 1	CAL; 10	LVS; 14	ATL; 14	BRI; 33	MAR; 19	TEX; 4	**PHO**; 43	TAL; 8	RCH; 6	DAR; 37	CLT; 21	DOV; 14	POC; 18	MCH; 42	SON; 7	NHA; 15	DAY; 36	CHI; 10	IND; 13	POC; 14	GLN; 26	MCH; 21	BRI; 6	CAL; 16	RCH; 33	NHA; 36	DOV; 13	KAN; 16	TAL; 43	CLT; 21	MAR; 23	ATL; 16	TEX; 28	PHO; 34	HOM; 21	17th	3735	
2009	Stewart–Haas Racing	39	Chevy	DAY; 36	CAL; 28	LVS; 25	ATL; 22	BRI; 7	MAR; 6	TEX; 15	PHO; 16	TAL; 3	RCH; 4	DAR; 4	**CLT**; 2	DOV; 8	POC; 5	MCH; 23	SON; 17	NHA; 29	DAY; 20	CHI; 6	IND; 14	POC; 14	GLN; 21	MCH; 15	BRI; 6	ATL; 9	RCH; 10	NHA; 7	DOV; 10	KAN; 22	CAL; 15	CLT; 11	**MAR**; 7	TAL; 36	TEX; 12	PHO; 20	HOM; 23	9th	6175	
2010	Stewart–Haas Racing	39	Chevy	DAY; 34	CAL; 36	LVS; 18	ATL; 17	BRI; 16	MAR; 4	PHO; 1	TEX; 11	TAL; 35	RCH; 8	DAR; 9	DOV; 13	**CLT**; 9	POC; 14	MCH; 32	SON; 16	NHA; 6	DAY; 26	CHI; 22	IND; 17	POC; 12	GLN; 12	MCH; 23	BRI; 6	ATL; 8	RCH; 11	NHA; 8	DOV; 8	KAN; 9	CAL; 5	CLT; 36	MAR; 30	TAL; 23	TEX; 20	PHO; 2	HOM; 7	15th	4302	
2011	Stewart–Haas Racing	39	Chevy	DAY; 22*	PHO; 5	LVS; 5	BRI; 10	CAL; 5	MAR; 20	TEX; 14	TAL; 25	RCH; 20	DAR; 5	DOV; 21	CLT; 31	KAN; 15	POC; 9	MCH; 6	SON; 25	DAY; 23*	KEN; 4	**NHA**; 1*	IND; 12	POC; 5	GLN; 16	MCH; 5	**BRI**; 8	ATL; 20	RCH; 8	CHI; 8	**NHA**; 25	DOV; 23	KAN; 18	CLT; 10	TAL; 38	MAR; 10	TEX; 16	PHO; 5	HOM; 12	10th	2284	
2012	Stewart–Haas Racing	39	Chevy	DAY; 21	PHO; 21	LVS; 4	BRI; 12	CAL; 7	MAR; 1	TEX; 21	KAN; 20	RCH; 15	TAL; 36	DAR; 23	CLT; 14	DOV; 15	POC; 12	MCH; 15	SON; 18	KEN; 34	DAY; 5	NHA; 10	IND; 7	POC; 6	GLN; 11	MCH; 8	BRI; 36	ATL; 35	RCH; 8	CHI; 5	NHA; 10	DOV; 21	TAL; 9	CLT; 20	KAN; 30	MAR; 11	TEX; 12	PHO; 5	HOM; 3	14th	1051	
2013	Stewart–Haas Racing	39	Chevy	DAY; 5	PHO; 40	LVS; 38	BRI; 7	CAL; 10	MAR; 31	TEX; 10	KAN; 14	RCH; 15	TAL; 32	DAR; 10	CLT; 6	DOV; 36	POC; 5	MCH; 18	SON; 15	KEN; 14	DAY; 10	NHA; 39	**IND**; 1	POC; 4	GLN; 14	MCH; 13	BRI; 21	ATL; 5	RCH; 3	CHI; 10	**NHA**; 16	DOV; 6	KAN; 35	CLT; 8	TAL; 9	MAR; 38	TEX; 9	PHO; 10	HOM; 17	11th	2286	
2014	Richard Childress Racing	31	Chevy	DAY; 22	PHO; 7	LVS; 7	BRI; 16	CAL; 20	MAR; 20	TEX; 16	DAR; 10	RCH; 8	TAL; 18	KAN; 11	CLT; 15	DOV; 31	POC; 7	MCH; 15	SON; 11	KEN; 3	DAY; 24	NHA; 5	IND; 11	POC; 8	GLN; 41	MCH; 11	BRI; 13	ATL; 7	RCH; 9	CHI; 15	NHA; 18	DOV; 8	KAN; 6	CLT; 7	TAL; 5	MAR; 3	TEX; 15	PHO; 11	HOM; 2	2nd	5042	
2015	Richard Childress Racing	31	Chevy	DAY; 38	ATL; 10	LVS; 3	PHO; 3	CAL; 5	MAR; 27	TEX; 12	BRI; 5	RCH; 11	TAL; 7	KAN; 10	CLT; 6	DOV; 18	POC; 39	MCH; 18	SON; 9	DAY; 8	KEN; 20	NHA; 11	IND; 11	POC; 23	GLN; 15	MCH; 8	BRI; 10	DAR; 13	RCH; 20	CHI; 4	NHA; 10	DOV; 19	CLT; 15	KAN; 11	TAL; 12	MAR; 7	TEX; 22	PHO; 11	HOM; 17	11th	2314	
2016	Richard Childress Racing	31	Chevy	DAY; 11	ATL; 24	LVS; 13	PHO; 39	CAL; 14	MAR; 10	TEX; 17	BRI; 9	RCH; 18	TAL; 28	KAN; 7	DOV; 16	CLT; 10	POC; 12	MCH; 11	SON; 8	DAY; 18	KEN; 3	NHA; 7	IND; 31	POC; 12	GLN; 16	BRI; 28	MCH; 17	DAR; 8	RCH; 28	CHI; 19	NHA; 20	DOV; 17	CLT; 4	KAN; 12	TAL; 14	MAR; 16	TEX; 10	PHO; 12	HOM; 25	18th	895	
2017	Richard Childress Racing	31	Chevy	DAY; 21	ATL; 35	LVS; 17	PHO; 1	CAL; 15	MAR; 8	TEX; 26	BRI; 14	RCH; 7	TAL; 25	KAN; 40	CLT; 9	DOV; 4	POC; 14	MCH; 15	SON; 15	DAY; 5	KEN; 22	NHA; 27	IND; 3	POC; 14	GLN; 25	MCH; 4	BRI; 6	DAR; 7	RCH; 3	CHI; 23	NHA; 13	DOV; 13	CLT; 40	TAL; 2	KAN; 33	MAR; 14	TEX; 20	PHO; 20	HOM; 10	16th	2196	
2018	Richard Childress Racing	31	Chevy	DAY; 8	ATL; 22	LVS; 11	PHO; 11	CAL; 21	MAR; 19	TEX; 27	BRI; 10	RCH; 37	TAL; 9	DOV; 33	KAN; 30	CLT; 35	POC; 25	MCH; 22	SON; 24	CHI; 15	DAY; 8	KEN; 21	NHA; 6	POC; 8	GLN; 19	MCH; 15	BRI; 12	DAR; 19	IND; 10	LVS; 9	RCH; 15	ROV; 11	DOV; 17	TAL; 25	KAN; 15	MAR; 8	TEX; 18	PHO; 11	HOM; 15	17th	769	
2019	Roush Fenway Racing	6	Ford	DAY; 14	ATL; 13	LVS; 24	PHO; 12	CAL; 22	MAR; 23	TEX; 11	BRI; 9	RCH; 9	TAL; 7	DOV; 18	KAN; 23	CLT; 16	POC; 16	MCH; 8	SON; 7	CHI; 17	DAY; 5	KEN; 9	NHA; 7	POC; 14	GLN; 25	MCH; 12	BRI; 11	DAR; 23	IND; 8	LVS; 10	RCH; 5	ROV; 32	DOV; 22	TAL; 2	KAN; 40	MAR; 10	TEX; 15	PHO; 18	HOM; 7	15th	2219	
2020	Roush Fenway Racing	6	Ford	DAY; 9	LVS	CAL	PHO	DAR; 15	DAR; 14	CLT; 27	CLT; 17	BRI; 15	ATL; 14	MAR; 12	HOM; 30	TAL; 23	POC; 15	POC; 18	IND; 34	KEN; 17	TEX; 13	KAN; 28	NHA; 21	MCH; 28	MCH; 13	DRC; 19	DOV; 19	DOV; 24	DAY; 36	DAR; 15	RCH; 23	BRI; 25	LVS; 15	TAL; 6	ROV; 31	KAN; 22	TEX; 19	MAR; 18	PHO; 24	25th	566	
2021	Roush Fenway Racing	6	Ford	DAY; 38	DRC; 20	HOM; 7	LVS; 18	PHO; 28	ATL; 13	BRD; 5	MAR; 19	RCH; 30	TAL; 13	KAN; 16	DAR; 10	DOV; 23	COA; 24	CLT; 27	SON; 33	NSH; 13	POC; 37	POC; 22	ROA; 32	ATL; 28	NHA; 24	GLN; 25	IRC; 10	MCH; 24	DAY; 3	DAR; 14	RCH; 20	BRI; 38	LVS; 20	TAL; 21	ROV; 39	TEX; 35	KAN; 27	MAR; 32	PHO; 23	28th	546	
2023	Rick Ware Racing	51	Ford	DAY	CAL	LVS	PHO	ATL	COA	RCH	BRD	MAR	TAL	DOV	KAN	DAR; 28	CLT	GTW	SON	NSH	CSC	ATL			RCH; 29	MCH	IRC	GLN	DAY	DAR; 27	KAN	BRI; 36	TEX	TAL	ROV	LVS	HOM; 26	MAR; 29	PHO; 34	55th	0^{1}	
2023	Rick Ware Racing	15	Ford																				NHA; 30	POC																55th	0^{1}	

===== Daytona 500 =====
Year	Team	Manufacturer	Start	Finish
2002	Penske Racing South	Ford	23	7
2003	Penske Racing South	Dodge	37	43
2004	Penske-Jasper Racing	Dodge	20	31
2005	Penske-Jasper Racing	Dodge	9	20
2006	Penske Racing South	Dodge	18	3
2007	Penske Racing South	Dodge	16	38
2008	Penske Racing South	Dodge	7	**1**
2009	Stewart–Haas Racing	Chevrolet	36	36
2010	Stewart–Haas Racing	Chevrolet	17	34
2011	Stewart–Haas Racing	Chevrolet	21	22
2012	Stewart–Haas Racing	Chevrolet	18	21
2013	Stewart–Haas Racing	Chevrolet	34	5
2014	Richard Childress Racing	Chevrolet	19	22
2015	Richard Childress Racing	Chevrolet	22	38
2016	Richard Childress Racing	Chevrolet	38	11
2017	Richard Childress Racing	Chevrolet	14	21
2018	Richard Childress Racing	Chevrolet	13	8
2019	Roush Fenway Racing	Ford	19	14
2020	Roush Fenway Racing	Ford	7	9
2021	Roush Fenway Racing	Ford	7	38

==== Xfinity Series ====
NASCAR Xfinity Series results
Year	Team	No.	Make	1	2	3	4	5	6	7	8	9	10	11	12	13	14	15	16	17	18	19	20	21	22	23	24	25	26	27	28	29	30	31	32	33	34	35	NXSC	Pts	Ref
2001	Penske Racing South	02	Ford	DAY	CAR; 9	LVS	**ATL**; 32	**DAR**; 17	BRI; 6	TEX; 14	NSH	TAL	CAL	RCH; 14	NHA; 15	NZH	CLT	DOV	KEN	MLW	GLN	**CHI**; 26*	GTW	PPR	IRP	MCH; 1*	BRI; 8	**DAR**; 4	RCH; 7	**DOV**; 21*	KAN	CLT	MEM	PHO	**CAR**; 7	HOM; 8			28th	1978	
2005	Penske Racing South	39	Dodge	DAY	CAL	MXC	LVS	ATL	NSH	BRI	TEX	PHO	TAL	DAR	RCH	CLT; 3	DOV	NSH	KEN	MLW	DAY	**CHI**; 3*	NHA	PPR	GTW	IRP	GLN; 1	MCH; 1	BRI; 1*	CAL	RCH	**DOV**; 1*	KAN	CLT; 1*	MEM	TEX; 16*	PHO	**HOM**; 1	34th	1595	
2006	Penske Racing South	39	Dodge	DAY	CAL; 2	MXC	LVS	ATL; 39	BRI	TEX	NSH	PHO	TAL	RCH; 5	DAR; 30	CLT	DOV	NSH	KEN	MLW	DAY	CHI	NHA	MAR	GTW	IRP			**BRI**; 6*	CAL	RCH	DOV	KAN	CLT	MEM	TEX	PHO	HOM	60th	659	
2006	Penske Racing South	02	Dodge																								GLN; 41	MCH											60th	659	
2007	Penske Racing South	12	Dodge	DAY	CAL	MXC	LVS	ATL	BRI; 4	NSH	TEX	PHO; 36	TAL	RCH	DAR; 11	CLT	DOV	NSH	KEN	MLW	NHA	DAY	CHI; 43	GTW	IRP	CGV	GLN; 9	MCH	BRI; 28	CAL; 31	RCH; 3	DOV	KAN	CLT	MEM	TEX	PHO	HOM	50th	851	
2008	FitzBradshaw Racing	22	Dodge	DAY	CAL	LVS	ATL	BRI	NSH	TEX	PHO	MXC	TAL	RCH	DAR	CLT	DOV	NSH	KEN	MLW	NHA	DAY	CHI	GTW	IRP	CGV	GLN; 12	MCH	BRI	CAL	RCH	DOV	KAN	CLT	MEM	TEX	PHO		81st	262	
2008	Kevin Harvick Incorporated	33	Chevy																																			HOM; 11	81st	262	
2009	Kevin Harvick Incorporated	33	Chevy	DAY	CAL	LVS	BRI	TEX	NSH	PHO	**TAL**; 2	RCH	DAR; 6	CLT																	DOV; 30	KAN	CAL	CLT; 7	MEM	TEX	PHO	HOM; 7	42nd	1191	
2009	JR Motorsports	5	Chevy												DOV; 32	NSH	KEN	MLW	NHA	DAY	CHI; 22	GTW	IRP	IOW		MCH; 6	BRI; 13	CGV	ATL	RCH									42nd	1191	
2009	Phoenix Racing	1	Chevy																						GLN; 35														42nd	1191	
2010	Phoenix Racing	1	Chevy	DAY	CAL	LVS	BRI	NSH	PHO	TEX	TAL	RCH	DAR	DOV; 2	CLT; 5	NSH	KEN	ROA	NHA	DAY; 8	CHI; 36	GTW	IRP	IOW	GLN; 25	MCH; 36	BRI; 35	CGV	ATL; 8	RCH; 21	DOV; 10	KAN	CAL; 7	CLT; 9	GTW	TEX	PHO	HOM	33rd	1393	
2011	Turner Motorsports	30	Chevy	DAY	PHO; 4	LVS	BRI	CAL	TEX	TAL	NSH	RCH	DAR	DOV	IOW	CLT	CHI	MCH	ROA	DAY	KEN	NHA	NSH	IRP	IOW	GLN	CGV	BRI	ATL	RCH	CHI	DOV	KAN	CLT	TEX	PHO	HOM		108th	0^{1}	
2012	Turner Motorsports	30	Chevy	DAY	PHO	LVS	BRI	CAL	TEX	RCH	TAL	DAR	IOW	CLT	DOV	MCH	ROA	KEN	DAY	NHA	CHI	IND	IOW	GLN	CGV	BRI	ATL	RCH	CHI	KEN	DOV	CLT	KAN	TEX; 19	PHO	HOM			127th	0^{1}	
2023	MBM Motorsports	66	Ford	DAY	CAL	LVS	PHO	ATL	COA	RCH	MAR	TAL	DOV	DAR	CLT	PIR	SON	NSH	CSC	ATL	NHA	POC	ROA	MCH	IRC	GLN	DAY	DAR	KAN	BRI	TEX	ROV	LVS	HOM; 38	MAR	PHO			72nd	1	

==== Craftsman Truck Series ====
NASCAR Craftsman Truck Series results
Year	Team	No.	Make	1	2	3	4	5	6	7	8	9	10	11	12	13	14	15	16	17	18	19	20	21	22	23	24	25	NCTSC	Pts	Ref
2008	Kevin Harvick Incorporated	2	Chevy	DAY	CAL	ATL	MAR	KAN	CLT	MFD	DOV	TEX	MCH	MLW	MEM	KEN	IRP	NSH	BRI	GTW	NHA	LVS	TAL	MAR	ATL; 1	TEX	PHO	HOM	63rd	190	
2009	Kevin Harvick Incorporated	2	Chevy	DAY	CAL	ATL	MAR	KAN	CLT; 4	DOV	TEX	MCH	MLW	MEM	KEN	IRP	NSH	**BRI**; 4	CHI	IOW	GTW	NHA	LVS	MAR	TAL	TEX	PHO	HOM	49th	325	
2011	Turner Motorsports	08	Chevy	DAY	PHO	DAR	MAR	NSH	DOV	CLT	KAN	TEX	KEN	IOW	NSH	IRP	POC	MCH	BRI	ATL; 5	CHI	NHA	KEN	LVS	TAL	MAR	TEX	HOM	88th	0^{1}	
2013	Turner Scott Motorsports	34	Chevy	DAY	MAR	CAR	KAN	CLT	DOV	TEX	KEN	IOW	ELD; 3	POC	MCH	BRI	MSP	IOW	CHI	LVS	TAL	MAR	TEX	PHO	HOM				89th	0^{1}	
2015	SWM-NEMCO Motorsports	8	Chevy	DAY	ATL	MAR	KAN; 2	CLT	DOV	TEX	GTW	IOW	KEN	ELD	POC	MCH	BRI	MSP	CHI	NHA	LVS	TAL	MAR	TEX	PHO	HOM			87th	0^{1}	
2018	Jordan Anderson Racing	3	Chevy	DAY	ATL	LVS	MAR	DOV	KAN	CLT	TEX	IOW	GTW	CHI	KEN	ELD; 30	POC	MCH	BRI	MSP	LVS	TAL	MAR	TEX	PHO	HOM			111th	0^{1}	
2021	DCC Racing	39	Ford	DAY	DRC	LVS	ATL	BRD; DNQ	RCH	KAN	DAR	COA	CLT	TEX	NSH	POC	KNX	GLN	GTW	DAR	BRI	LVS	TAL	MAR	PHO				125th	0^{1}	
2026	Kaulig Racing	25	Ram	DAY	ATL	STP	DAR	ROC	BRI	TEX	GLN	DOV	CLT	NSS	MCH	COR	LRP	NWS; 24	IRP	RCH	NHA	BRI	KAN	CLT	PHO	TAL	MAR	HOM	78th	13	

^{*} Season still in progress
^{1} Ineligible for series points

==== Whelen Modified Tour ====
NASCAR Whelen Modified Tour results
Year	Car owner	No.	Make	1	2	3	4	5	6	7	8	9	10	11	12	13	14	15	16	17	18	NWMTC	Pts	Ref
2008	Kevin Manion	7	Chevy	TMP	STA	STA	TMP	NHA	SPE	RIV	STA	TMP	MAN	TMP	**NHA**; 20	MAR	CHE	STA	TMP			56th	103	
2009	Kevin Manion	7	Chevy	TMP	STA	STA	NHA; 34	SPE	RIV	STA	BRI; 25	TMP	NHA; 8	MAR	STA	TMP						39th	291	
2010	Kevin Manion	7NY	Chevy	TMP	STA	STA	MAR	**NHA**; 1	LIM	MND	RIV	STA	TMP	BRI; 1	**NHA**; 1*	STA	TMP					34th	560	
2011	Kevin Manion	7	Chevy	TMP	STA	STA	MND	TMP	NHA; DSQ^{†}	RIV	STA	NHA										38th	269	
2011	Marcy Putnam	77NY	Chevy										BRI; 1*	DEL	TMP	LRP	NHA; 28	STA	TMP			38th	269	
2012	Marcy Putnam	7	Chevy	TMP	STA	MND	STA	WFD	NHA; 30	STA	TMP	BRI	TMP	RIV	NHA; 4	STA	TMP					36th	54	
2013	Mike Curb	7	Chevy	TMP	STA	STA	WFD	RIV	NHA; 5	MND	STA	TMP	BRI; 5	RIV	**NHA**; 2*	STA	TMP					28th	122	
2014	Mike Curb	7	Chevy	TMP	STA	STA	WFD	RIV	NHA; 4	MND	STA	TMP	BRI; 5	NHA; 20	STA	TMP						27th	103	
2015	Mike Curb	7	Chevy	TMP	STA	WFD	STA	TMP	RIV	NHA; 11	MND	STA	TMP	BRI; 4	RIV	NHA; 26	STA	TMP				39th	91	
2016	Mike Curb	77	Chevy	TMP	STA	WFD	STA	TMP	RIV	NHA; 5	MND	STA	TMP									29th	111	
2016	Mike Curb	7	Chevy											BRI; 11	RIV	OSW	SEE	NHA; 5	STA	TMP		29th	111	
2017	Mike Curb	77	Chevy	MYR	TMP	STA	LGY	TMP	RIV	NHA; 23	STA	TMP	BRI	SEE	OSW	RIV	**NHA**; 9	STA	TMP			48th	58	
2018	Mike Curb	77	Chevy	MYR	TMP	STA	SEE	TMP	LGY	RIV	NHA; 3	STA	TMP	BRI	OSW	RIV	NHA	STA	TMP			51st	42	
2021	Mike Curb	53	Chevy	MAR; 29	STA	RIV	JEN	OSW	RIV	NHA; 24	NRP	STA	BEE	OSW	RCH; 4	RIV	STA					36th	76	
2022	Neal Cantor	39	Chevy	NSM	RCH; 13	RIV	LEE	JEN	MND	RIV	WAL	NHA	CLM	TMP	LGY	OSW	RIV	TMP	MAR; 3			46th	73	
2023	Neil Stanley	39	Chevy	NSM	RCH; 29	MON	RIV	LEE	SEE	RIV	WAL	NHA	LMP	THO	LGY	OSW	MON	RIV	NWS; 6	THO	MAR; 11	40th	87	
2024	Joe Stearns	14	Chevy	NSM; 14																		26th	133	
2024	Curb Racing	77	Chevy		RCH; 11	THO	MON	RIV	SEE	NHA	MON	LMP	THO	OSW	RIV	MON	THO	NWS; 13				26th	133	
2024	Eighty-Two Autosport	8	Chevy																MAR; 5			26th	133	
2025	Eighty-Two Autosport	8	Chevy	NSM; 8	THO																	24th	146	
2025	Tim Connolly	4	Chevy			NWS; 13	SEE	RIV	WMM	LMP; 15	MON; Wth	MON; Wth	THO	RCH; 16	OSW	NHA	RIV	THO	MAR; 24			24th	146	
2026	Tim Connolly	4	Chevy	NSM; 8																		31st	96	
2026	Glenn Styres Racing	0	N/A		MAR; 10	THO	SEE	RIV	OXF	SEE	CLM	WMM	MON	THO	NHA; 18	STA	OSW	RIV	THO			31st	96	
^{†} – Newman was disqualified for a post-race technical violation and removed from the results list entirely.

==== Whelen Southern Modified Tour ====
NASCAR Whelen Southern Modified Tour results
Year	Car owner	No.	Make	1	2	3	4	5	6	7	8	9	10	11	NWSMTC	Pts	Ref
2012	Gary Putnam	77	Chevy	CRW	CRW	SBO	CRW	CRW	BGS	**BRI**; 7	LGY	THO	CRW	CLT	38th	37	

=== ARCA Re/Max Series ===
(key) (Bold – Pole position awarded by qualifying time. Italics – Pole position earned by points standings or practice time. * – Most laps led.)

ARCA Re/Max Series results
Year	Team	No.	Make	1	2	3	4	5	6	7	8	9	10	11	12	13	14	15	16	17	18	19	20	21	22	23	24	25	ARMC	Pts	Ref
1997	Ed Rensi Racing	63	Chevy	DAY	ATL	SLM	CLT	CLT	POC	MCH	SBS	TOL	KIL	FRS	MIN	POC	MCH	DSF	GTW; 35	SLM	WIN	CLT	TAL	ISF	ATL				143rd	–	
2000	Penske–Kranefuss Racing	27	Ford	DAY	SLM	AND	CLT	KIL	FRS	MCH; 7	POC	TOL	KEN	BLN	POC; 1*	WIN	ISF	**KEN**; 1*	DSF	SLM	**CLT**; 1*	TAL; 25	ATL						32nd	1100	
2001	Penske Racing South	27	Ford	DAY; 1	NSH	WIN	SLM	GTW	KEN	CLT	**KAN**; 20	MCH	POC	MEM	GLN	KEN	MCH	POC	NSH	ISF	CHI	DSF	SLM	TOL	BLN	CLT	TAL	ATL	82nd	390	

=== International Race of Champions ===
(key) (Bold – Pole position. * – Most laps led.)

International Race of Champions results
Year	Make	1	2	3	4	IROC	Pts	Ref
2003	Pontiac	DAY; 12	**TAL**; 7	CHI; 2	IND; 3	6th	48	
2004	Pontiac	**DAY**; 1	TEX; 4	RCH; 2	ATL; 2	2nd	67	
2006	Pontiac	DAY; 11	TEX; 2	DAY; 3	ATL; 4	4th	54	

=== Superstar Racing Experience ===
(key) * – Most laps led. ^{1} – Heat 1 winner. ^{2} – Heat 2 winner.

Superstar Racing Experience results
Year	No.	1	2	3	4	5	6	SRXC	Pts
2022	39	FIF; 3	SBO; 4	STA; 1	NSV; 6	I55; 4	SHA; 8^{2}	2nd	193
2023	39	STA; 2^{2}	STA II; 1	MMI; 5	BER; 3^{1}	ELD; 3	LOS; 4	1st	212

=== CARS Late Model Stock Car Tour ===
(key) (Bold – Pole position awarded by qualifying time. Italics – Pole position earned by points standings or practice time. * – Most laps led. ** – All laps led.)

CARS Late Model Stock Car Tour results
Year	Team	No.	Make	1	2	3	4	5	6	7	8	9	10	11	12	13	14	15	CLMSCTC	Pts	Ref
2025	Matt Piercy Racing	7	N/A	AAS	WCS	CDL	OCS; 14	ACE	NWS	LGY	DOM	CRW	HCY	AND	FLC	SBO	TCM	NWS	67th	28	

=== SMART Modified Tour ===
SMART Modified Tour results
Year	Car owner	No.	Make	1	2	3	4	5	6	7	8	9	10	11	12	13	14	SMTC	Pts	Ref
2022	N/A	39VA	N/A	FLO	SNM	CRW	SBO	FCS	CRW	NWS; 1	NWS	CAR	DOM	HCY	TRI	PUL		N/A	0	
2023	N/A	39	N/A	FLO; 6	CRW	SBO	HCY; 5	FCS; 5	CRW						ROU; 2			14th	154	
2023	N/A	39VA	N/A							**ACE**; 2	CAR; 2							14th	154	
2023	N/A	39V	N/A									PUL; 17	TRI	SBO				14th	154	
2024	Randy Renfrow	2	N/A	FLO; 3	CRW; 2	SBO; 23	TRI; 1	ROU; 9	HCY; 7	FCS; 5	CRW; 13	JAC; 1	CAR; 3	CRW; 10	DOM; 18	SBO; 2	NWS; 8	3rd	533	
2025	Randy Renfrow	2	N/A	FLO; 15	AND; 7	SBO; 8	ROU; 1*	HCY; 14	FCS; 1	CRW; 4	**CPS**; 3*	CAR; 10	CRW; 9	DOM; 1*	FCS; 5	TRI; 18	NWS; 3	2nd	505	
2026	Randy Renfrow	2	N/A	FLO; 5	AND; 5	SBO; 3	DOM; 11	HCY; 5	WKS; 2	FCR; 4	CRW; 4	PUL; 2	CAR; 6	ROU; 14	TRI; 8	NWS; 2		2nd	633	

== See also ==
- List of all-time NASCAR Cup Series winners
- List of NASCAR All-Star Race drivers
- List of people from Indiana
- List of Purdue University alumni

Achievements
Preceded by Jeff Gordon	The Winston Winner; 2002	Succeeded by Jimmie Johnson
Preceded by Kevin Harvick	Daytona 500 Winner; 2008	Succeeded by Matt Kenseth
Preceded by Jimmie Johnson	Brickyard 400 winner 2013	Succeeded by Jeff Gordon
Awards
Preceded by Kevin Harvick	NASCAR Winston Cup Series Rookie of the Year; 2002	Succeeded by Jamie McMurray
