= 2021 Pinty's Truck Race on Dirt =

Race details
- Race 5 of 22 of the 2021 NASCAR Camping World Truck Series
- Date: March 29, 2021
- Official name: Pinty's Truck Race on Dirt
- Location: Bristol, Tennessee, Bristol Motor Speedway
- Course: Dirt oval
- Course length: 0.533 miles (0.858 km)
- Distance: 150 laps, 79.95 mi (128.667 km)
- Average speed: 41.096 miles per hour (66.138 km/h)

Pole position
Driver	John Hunter Nemechek	Kyle Busch Motorsports
- Time: N/A

Most laps led
Driver	Martin Truex Jr.	Kyle Busch Motorsports
- Laps: 105

Winner
No. 51	Martin Truex Jr.	Kyle Busch Motorsports

Television in the United States
- Network: Fox Sports 1
- Announcers: Vince Welch, Michael Waltrip, Joey Logano

Radio in the United States
- Radio: Motor Racing Network

The 2021 Pinty's Truck Race on Dirt was the 5th stock car race of the 2021 NASCAR Camping World Truck Series, and the inaugural running of the event. The race was held on Monday, March 29, 2021, in Bristol, Tennessee at a dirt version of Bristol Motor Speedway. The race was originally supposed to be run on Saturday, March 27, 2021, but due to torrential downpour over Saturday and Sunday, the race was delayed to Monday. The race would take 150 laps to complete. Martin Truex Jr., running a one-off race for Kyle Busch Motorsports, would win the race, marking his first career win in the Truck Series. Ben Rhodes of ThorSport Racing and Raphaël Lessard of GMS Racing would score the rest of the podium positions, scoring 2nd and 3rd, respectively.

== Background ==
Bristol Motor Speedway, formerly known as Bristol International Raceway and Bristol Raceway, is a NASCAR short track venue located in Bristol, Tennessee. Constructed in 1960, it held its first NASCAR race on July 30, 1961. Despite its short length, Bristol is among the most popular tracks on the NASCAR schedule because of its distinct features, which include extraordinarily steep banking, an all concrete surface, two pit roads, and stadium-like seating.

In 2021, the race shifted to a dirt surface version of the track and was renamed the Pinty's Truck Race on Dirt. On January 25, 2021, NASCAR announced the stage lengths of all events in all three series. According to the stage lengths, it states the race will consist of 150 laps.

=== Entry list ===
#	Driver	Team	Make
1	Hailie Deegan (R)	David Gilliland Racing	Ford
2	Sheldon Creed	GMS Racing	Chevrolet
02	Daniel Suárez (i)	Young's Motorsports	Chevrolet
3	J. R. Heffner*	Jordan Anderson Racing	Chevrolet
4	John Hunter Nemechek	Kyle Busch Motorsports	Toyota
04	Chase Briscoe (i)	Roper Racing	Ford
6	Norm Benning	Norm Benning Racing	Chevrolet
9	Codie Rohrbaugh	CR7 Motorsports	Chevrolet
10	Jennifer Jo Cobb	Jennifer Jo Cobb	Chevrolet
11	Bubba Wallace (i)	Spencer Davis Motorsports	Toyota
12	Tate Fogleman	Young's Motorsports	Chevrolet
13	Johnny Sauter	ThorSport Racing	Toyota
15	Tanner Gray	David Gilliland Racing	Ford
16	Austin Hill	Hattori Racing Enterprises	Toyota
17	Kevin Harvick (i)	David Gilliland Racing	Ford
18	Chandler Smith (R)	Kyle Busch Motorsports	Toyota
19	Derek Kraus	McAnally–Hilgemann Racing	Toyota
20	Spencer Boyd	Young's Motorsports	Chevrolet
21	Zane Smith	GMS Racing	Chevrolet
22	Austin Wayne Self	AM Racing	Chevrolet
23	Chase Purdy (R)	GMS Racing	Chevrolet
24	Raphaël Lessard	GMS Racing	Chevrolet
25	Timothy Peters	Rackley W.A.R.	Chevrolet
26	Tyler Ankrum	GMS Racing	Chevrolet
30	Danny Bohn	On Point Motorsports	Toyota
33	Myatt Snider (i)	Reaume Brothers Racing	Chevrolet
34	Jake Griffin	Reaume Brothers Racing	Chevrolet
38	Todd Gilliland	Front Row Motorsports	Ford
39	Ryan Newman (i)	DCC Racing	Ford
40	Ryan Truex	Niece Motorsports	Chevrolet
41	Cody Erickson	Cram Racing Enterprises	Chevrolet
42	Carson Hocevar (R)	Niece Motorsports	Chevrolet
44	Kyle Larson (i)	Niece Motorsports	Chevrolet
45	Brett Moffitt (i)	Niece Motorsports	Chevrolet
49	Andrew Gordon	CMI Motorsports	Chevrolet
51	Martin Truex Jr. (i)	Kyle Busch Motorsports	Toyota
52	Stewart Friesen	Halmar Friesen Racing	Toyota
56	Mike Marlar (i)	Hill Motorsports	Toyota
62	Jessica Friesen	Halmar Friesen Racing	Toyota
75	Parker Kligerman	Henderson Motorsports	Chevrolet
83	Trevor Collins	CMI Motorsports	Chevrolet
88	Matt Crafton	ThorSport Racing	Toyota
98	Grant Enfinger	ThorSport Racing	Toyota
99	Ben Rhodes	ThorSport Racing	Toyota
Official entry list

*Withdrew due to a crash in practice on Friday.

== Practice ==
=== 1st practice ===
The 1st practice took place on Friday, March 20 at 3:58 EST. Raphaël Lessard would set the fastest time with a 19.384 and an average speed of 92.384 miles per hour (148.678 km/h).

Many drivers would suffer incidents during the practice, with 11 spins counted.

Pos.	#	Driver	Team	Make	Time	Speed
1	24	Raphaël Lessard	GMS Racing	Chevrolet	19.384	92.860
2	42	Carson Hocevar	Niece Motorsports	Chevrolet	19.396	92.803
3	1	Hailie Deegan	David Gilliland Racing	Ford	19.418	92.698
Full 1st practice results

=== Final practice ===
Final practice took place on Friday, March 21, at 6:28 PM EST for 50 minutes. Ben Rhodes of ThorSport Racing would set the fastest time, with a 20.703 and an average speed of 86.944 miles per hour (139.923 km/h).

J. R. Heffner would suffer a major crash, leading him to be towed. The 3 team would eventually withdraw from the race.

Pos.	#	Driver	Team	Make	Time	Speed
1	99	Ben Rhodes	ThorSport Racing	Toyota	20.703	86.944
2	39	Ryan Newman	DCC Racing	Ford	20.716	86.889
3	15	Tanner Gray	David Gilliland Racing	Ford	20.721	86.868
Full final practice results

== Starting lineup ==
Originally, qualifying was scheduled to take place on Saturday, March 21. Qualifying was delayed, but eventually there was a break in the weather, and the first heat was started- but with overcast skies and a high chance of rain. Within a couple of laps, it started to rain, and every car in the heat except Mike Marlar (who started at the pole) had their windshields and grills covered by mud. The heat was stopped and eventually canceled. As a result, the lineup was set by owner's points- which meant John Hunter Nemechek of Kyle Busch Motorsports won the pole.

Pos.	#	Driver	Team	Make
1	4	John Hunter Nemechek	Kyle Busch Motorsports	Toyota
2	16	Austin Hill	Hattori Racing Enterprises	Toyota
3	2	Sheldon Creed	GMS Racing	Chevrolet
4	88	Matt Crafton	ThorSport Racing	Toyota
5	13	Johnny Sauter	ThorSport Racing	Toyota
6	21	Zane Smith	GMS Racing	Chevrolet
7	52	Stewart Friesen	Halmar Friesen Racing	Toyota
8	98	Grant Enfinger	ThorSport Racing	Toyota
9	99	Ben Rhodes	ThorSport Racing	Toyota
10	45	Brett Moffitt	Niece Motorsports	Chevrolet
11	42	Carson Hocevar	Niece Motorsports	Chevrolet
12	19	Derek Kraus	McAnally–Hilgemann Racing	Toyota
13	38	Todd Gilliland	Front Row Motorsports	Ford
14	40	Ryan Truex	Niece Motorsports	Chevrolet
15	51	Martin Truex Jr.	Kyle Busch Motorsports	Toyota
16	75	Parker Kligerman	Henderson Motorsports	Chevrolet
17	22	Austin Wayne Self	AM Racing	Chevrolet
18	15	Tanner Gray	David Gilliland Racing	Ford
19	26	Tyler Ankrum	GMS Racing	Chevrolet
20	9	Codie Rohrbaugh	CR7 Motorsports	Chevrolet
21	18	Chandler Smith	Kyle Busch Motorsports	Toyota
22	1	Hailie Deegan	David Gilliland Racing	Ford
23	23	Chase Purdy	GMS Racing	Chevrolet
24	12	Tate Fogleman	Young's Motorsports	Chevrolet
25	30	Danny Bohn	On Point Motorsports	Toyota
26	02	Daniel Suárez	Young's Motorsports	Chevrolet
27	25	Timothy Peters	Rackley W.A.R.	Chevrolet
28	44	Kyle Larson	Niece Motorsports	Chevrolet
29	24	Raphaël Lessard	GMS Racing	Chevrolet
30	17	Kevin Harvick	David Gilliland Racing	Ford
31	20	Spencer Boyd	Young's Motorsports	Chevrolet
32	11	Bubba Wallace	Spencer Davis Motorsports	Toyota
33	04	Chase Briscoe	Roper Racing	Ford
34	41	Cody Erickson	Cram Racing Enterprises	Chevrolet
35	10	Jennifer Jo Cobb	Jennifer Jo Cobb	Chevrolet
36	34	Jake Griffin	Reaume Brothers Racing	Chevrolet
37	33	Myatt Snider	Reaume Brothers Racing	Chevrolet
38	56	Mike Marlar	Hill Motorsports	Toyota
39	6	Norm Benning	Norm Benning Racing	Chevrolet
40	49	Andrew Gordon	CMI Motorsports	Chevrolet
Failed to qualify
41	83	Trevor Collins	CMI Motorsports	Chevrolet
42	62	Jessica Friesen	Halmar Friesen Racing	Toyota
43	39	Ryan Newman	DCC Racing	Ford
WD	3	J. R. Heffner	Jordan Anderson Racing	Chevrolet
Failed to qualify

== Race results ==
Stage 1 Laps: 40

Fin	#	Driver	Team	Make	Pts
1	51	Martin Truex Jr.	Kyle Busch Motorsports	Toyota	0
2	2	Sheldon Creed	GMS Racing	Chevrolet	9
3	21	Zane Smith	GMS Racing	Chevrolet	8
4	52	Stewart Friesen	Halmar Friesen Racing	Toyota	7
5	4	John Hunter Nemechek	Kyle Busch Motorsports	Toyota	6
6	16	Austin Hill	Hattori Racing Enterprises	Toyota	5
7	99	Ben Rhodes	ThorSport Racing	Toyota	4
8	88	Matt Crafton	ThorSport Racing	Toyota	3
9	98	Grant Enfinger	ThorSport Racing	Toyota	2
10	13	Johnny Sauter	ThorSport Racing	Toyota	1

Stage 2 Laps: 50

Fin	#	Driver	Team	Make	Pts
1	51	Martin Truex Jr.	Kyle Busch Motorsports	Toyota	0
2	99	Ben Rhodes	ThorSport Racing	Toyota	9
3	16	Austin Hill	Hattori Racing Enterprises	Toyota	8
4	04	Chase Briscoe	Roper Racing	Ford	0
5	2	Sheldon Creed	GMS Racing	Chevrolet	6
6	38	Todd Gilliland	Front Row Motorsports	Ford	5
7	52	Stewart Friesen	Halmar Friesen Racing	Toyota	4
8	24	Raphaël Lessard	GMS Racing	Chevrolet	3
9	22	Austin Wayne Self	AM Racing	Chevrolet	2
10	98	Grant Enfinger	ThorSport Racing	Toyota	1

Stage 3 Laps: 60

Fin	St	#	Driver	Team	Make	Laps	Led	Status	Pts
1	15	51	Martin Truex Jr.	Kyle Busch Motorsports	Toyota	150	105	running	0
2	9	99	Ben Rhodes	ThorSport Racing	Toyota	150	3	running	48
3	29	24	Raphaël Lessard	GMS Racing	Chevrolet	150	0	running	37
4	13	38	Todd Gilliland	Front Row Motorsports	Ford	150	0	running	38
5	33	04	Chase Briscoe	Roper Racing	Ford	150	0	running	0
6	8	98	Grant Enfinger	ThorSport Racing	Toyota	150	2	running	34
7	6	21	Zane Smith	GMS Racing	Chevrolet	150	0	running	38
8	16	75	Parker Kligerman	Henderson Motorsports	Chevrolet	150	0	running	29
9	2	16	Austin Hill	Hattori Racing Enterprises	Toyota	150	1	running	41
10	17	22	Austin Wayne Self	AM Racing	Chevrolet	150	0	running	29
11	32	11	Bubba Wallace	Spencer Davis Motorsports	Toyota	150	0	running	0
12	7	52	Stewart Friesen	Halmar Friesen Racing	Toyota	150	1	running	36
13	18	15	Tanner Gray	David Gilliland Racing	Ford	150	0	running	24
14	4	88	Matt Crafton	ThorSport Racing	Toyota	150	0	running	26
15	30	17	Kevin Harvick	David Gilliland Racing	Ford	150	0	running	0
16	3	2	Sheldon Creed	GMS Racing	Chevrolet	150	38	running	36
17	26	02	Daniel Suárez	Young's Motorsports	Chevrolet	150	0	running	0
18	23	23	Chase Purdy	GMS Racing	Chevrolet	150	0	running	19
19	22	1	Hailie Deegan	David Gilliland Racing	Ford	150	0	running	18
20	14	40	Ryan Truex	Niece Motorsports	Chevrolet	150	0	running	17
21	11	42	Carson Hocevar	Niece Motorsports	Chevrolet	150	0	running	16
22	37	33	Myatt Snider	Reaume Brothers Racing	Chevrolet	150	0	running	0
23	24	12	Tate Fogleman	Young's Motorsports	Chevrolet	150	0	running	14
24	10	45	Brett Moffitt	Niece Motorsports	Chevrolet	150	0	running	13
25	31	20	Spencer Boyd	Young's Motorsports	Chevrolet	150	0	running	12
26	34	41	Cody Erickson	Cram Racing Enterprises	Chevrolet	150	0	running	11
27	20	9	Codie Rohrbaugh	CR7 Motorsports	Chevrolet	150	0	running	10
28	38	56	Mike Marlar	Hill Motorsports	Toyota	148	0	running	0
29	36	34	Jake Griffin	Reaume Brothers Racing	Chevrolet	147	0	running	8
30	27	25	Timothy Peters	Rackley W.A.R.	Chevrolet	147	0	running	7
31	40	49	Andrew Gordon	CMI Motorsports	Chevrolet	144	0	running	6
32	5	13	Johnny Sauter	ThorSport Racing	Toyota	124	0	accident	6
33	35	10	Jennifer Jo Cobb	Jennifer Jo Cobb	Chevrolet	120	0	electrical	4
34	21	18	Chandler Smith	Kyle Busch Motorsports	Toyota	117	0	accident	3
35	28	44	Kyle Larson	Niece Motorsports	Chevrolet	98	0	accident	0
36	25	30	Danny Bohn	On Point Motorsports	Toyota	98	0	accident	1
37	39	6	Norm Benning	Norm Benning Racing	Chevrolet	72	0	parked	1
38	12	19	Derek Kraus	McAnally–Hilgemann Racing	Toyota	49	0	accident	1
39	1	4	John Hunter Nemechek	Kyle Busch Motorsports	Toyota	48	0	accident	7
40	19	26	Tyler Ankrum	GMS Racing	Chevrolet	34	0	accident	1
Official race results

Previous race: 2021 Fr8Auctions 200	NASCAR Camping World Truck Series; 2021 season	Next race: 2021 ToyotaCare 250
