= DCC Racing =

American stock car racing team

Diversified Custom Concepts Racing
- Owner(s): Brad Means
- Series: NASCAR Camping World Truck Series
- Race drivers: NASCAR Camping World Truck Series: 39. Ryan Newman
- Manufacturer: Ford
- Opened: 2021

Career
- Debut: 2021 Pinty's Truck Race on Dirt
- Races competed: 0
- Drivers' Championships: 0
- Race victories: 0
- Pole positions: 0

DCC Racing, also known as Diversified Custom Concepts Racing, is an American stock car racing team that last competed part-time in the NASCAR Craftsman Truck Series. The team is currently owned by Brad Means, the son of owner-driver Jimmy Means. The team is also currently partnered with Reaume Brothers Racing, with Dylan Lupton last driving for the partnership.

== NASCAR Camping World Truck Series ==
=== Truck No. 39 history ===
On March 17, 2021, Ryan Newman announced on The Dale Jr. Download that he would attempt to make the 2021 Pinty's Truck Race on Dirt with the newly founded team, with sponsorship coming from Coca-Cola and Aggressive Hydraulics. The team attempted pre-race ceremonies, appearing in practice sessions during the weekend. However, rain that forced the cancellation of the qualifying races meant that the team did not qualify for the race, as they had no owner points from the previous season.

==== Truck No. 39 results ====
NASCAR Camping World Truck Series results
Year	Driver	No.	Make	1	2	3	4	5	6	7	8	9	10	11	12	13	14	15	16	17	18	19	20	21	22	Owners	Pts	Ref
2021	Ryan Newman	39	Ford	DAY	DAY	LVS	ATL	BRI; DNQ	RCH	KAN	DAR	COA	CLT	TEX	NSH	POC	KNX	GLN	GTW	DAR	BRI	LVS	TAL	MAR	PHO	55th	0	

=== Reaume Brothers Racing partnership ===
On August 27, 2021, the team announced that they would partner with fellow NASCAR Camping World Truck Series team Reaume Brothers Racing to let Dylan Lupton drive the final four races of the season in the No. 34 ride. However, Lupton would only run the first two of the four, as Josh Reaume and Will Rodgers drove the No. 34 for Martinsville and Phoenix respectively.
