= 2013 Brickyard 400 =

2013 Crown Royal Presents the Samuel Deeds 400 at the Brickyard
Race details
- Race 20 of 36 in the 2013 NASCAR Sprint Cup Series
- Indianapolis Motor Speedway track layout
- Date: July 28, 2013
- Location: Indianapolis Motor Speedway, Speedway, Indiana, United States
- Course: Permanent racing facility
- Course length: 2.5 miles (4.023 km)
- Distance: 160 laps, 400 mi (643.737 km)
- Weather: Temperatures up to 78.1 °F (25.6 °C); wind speeds up to 17.1 miles per hour (27.5 km/h)
- Average speed: 153.485 mph (247.010 km/h)

Pole position
Driver	Ryan Newman	Stewart–Haas Racing
- Time: 47.992 seconds

Most laps led
Driver	Jimmie Johnson	Hendrick Motorsports
- Laps: 73

Winner
No. 39	Ryan Newman	Stewart–Haas Racing

Television in the United States
- Network: ESPN
- Announcers: Allen Bestwick, Dale Jarrett and Andy Petree
- Nielsen ratings: 3.6 (5.460 million viewers)

The 2013 Crown Royal Presents the Samuel Deeds 400 at the Brickyard, the 20th running of the event, was a NASCAR Sprint Cup Series stock car race that was held on July 28, 2013, at the Indianapolis Motor Speedway in Speedway, Indiana. Contested over 160 laps, it was the twentieth race of the 2013 NASCAR Sprint Cup Series season. Ryan Newman of Stewart–Haas Racing won the race, his first of the season, while Jimmie Johnson finished second. Kasey Kahne, Tony Stewart, and Matt Kenseth rounded out the top five.

== Report ==
=== Background ===
Indianapolis Motor Speedway is a four-turn rectangular-oval track that is 2.5 miles (4.023 km) long. The track's turns are banked at 9 degrees, while the front stretch, the location of the finish line, has no banking. The back stretch, opposite of the front, also has a zero degree banking. The track's front and back straightaway are both 3,300 ft (1,000 m), while the short straightaways between turn one and two, as well as between turn three and four are 660 feet (200 m) long. The racetrack has seats for more than 250,000 spectators.

Before the race, Jimmie Johnson was leading the Drivers' Championship with 696 points, while Clint Bowyer stood in second with 640 points. Carl Edwards followed in third with 623, one point ahead of Kevin Harvick and forty-five ahead of Dale Earnhardt Jr. in fourth and fifth. Matt Kenseth, with 576, was in sixth; tied with Kyle Busch, who was scored seventh. Eighth-placed Greg Biffle was sixteen points ahead of Brad Keselowski and twenty-two ahead of Kasey Kahne in ninth and tenth. In the Manufacturers' Championship, Chevrolet was leading with 134 points, nine points ahead of Toyota. Ford was third with 95 points.

=== Entry list ===
(R) - Denotes rookie driver. (W) - Denotes past winner of event (i) - Denotes driver who is ineligible for series driver points.

No.	Driver	Team	Manufacturer
1	Jamie McMurray (W)	Earnhardt Ganassi Racing	Chevrolet
2	Brad Keselowski	Penske Racing	Ford
5	Kasey Kahne	Hendrick Motorsports	Chevrolet
7	Dave Blaney	Tommy Baldwin Racing	Chevrolet
9	Marcos Ambrose	Richard Petty Motorsports	Ford
10	Danica Patrick (R)	Stewart–Haas Racing	Chevrolet
11	Denny Hamlin	Joe Gibbs Racing	Toyota
13	Casey Mears	Germain Racing	Ford
14	Tony Stewart (W)	Stewart–Haas Racing	Chevrolet
15	Clint Bowyer	Michael Waltrip Racing	Toyota
16	Greg Biffle	Roush Fenway Racing	Ford
17	Ricky Stenhouse Jr. (R)	Roush Fenway Racing	Ford
18	Kyle Busch	Joe Gibbs Racing	Toyota
19	Mike Bliss (i)	Humphrey Smith Racing	Toyota
20	Matt Kenseth	Joe Gibbs Racing	Toyota
21	Trevor Bayne (i)	Wood Brothers Racing	Ford
22	Joey Logano	Penske Racing	Ford
24	Jeff Gordon (W)	Hendrick Motorsports	Chevrolet
27	Paul Menard (W)	Richard Childress Racing	Chevrolet
29	Kevin Harvick (W)	Richard Childress Racing	Chevrolet
30	David Stremme	Swan Racing	Toyota
31	Jeff Burton	Richard Childress Racing	Chevrolet
32	Timmy Hill (R)	FAS Lane Racing	Ford
33	Austin Dillon (i)	Richard Childress Racing	Chevrolet
34	David Ragan	Front Row Motorsports	Ford
35	Josh Wise (i)	Front Row Motorsports	Ford
36	J. J. Yeley	Tommy Baldwin Racing	Chevrolet
38	David Gilliland	Front Row Motorsports	Ford
39	Ryan Newman	Stewart–Haas Racing	Chevrolet
40	Landon Cassill (i)	Circle Sport	Chevrolet
42	Juan Pablo Montoya	Earnhardt Ganassi Racing	Chevrolet
43	Aric Almirola	Richard Petty Motorsports	Ford
47	Bobby Labonte (W)	JTG Daugherty Racing	Toyota
48	Jimmie Johnson (W)	Hendrick Motorsports	Chevrolet
51	A. J. Allmendinger	Phoenix Racing	Chevrolet
55	Mark Martin	Michael Waltrip Racing	Toyota
56	Martin Truex Jr.	Michael Waltrip Racing	Toyota
78	Kurt Busch	Furniture Row Racing	Chevrolet
83	David Reutimann	BK Racing	Toyota
87	Joe Nemechek (i)	NEMCO-Jay Robinson Racing	Toyota
88	Dale Earnhardt Jr.	Hendrick Motorsports	Chevrolet
93	Travis Kvapil	BK Racing	Toyota
95	Scott Speed	Leavine Family Racing	Ford
98	Michael McDowell	Phil Parsons Racing	Ford
99	Carl Edwards	Roush Fenway Racing	Ford
Official entry list

=== Practice and qualifying ===
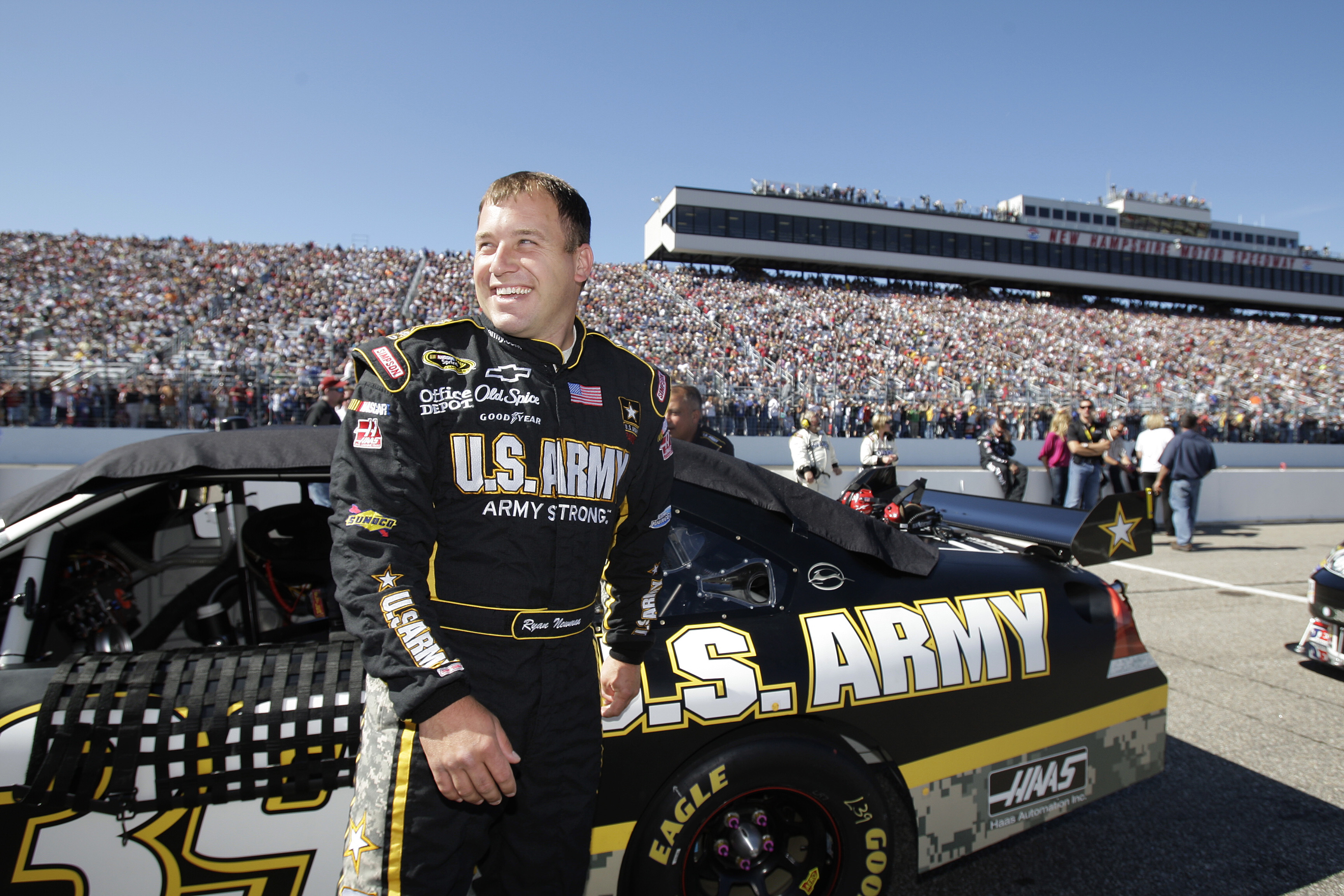
Ryan Newman won the pole position, his fiftieth of his career

Two practice sessions are scheduled to be held in preparation for the race. The first session, held on July 26, 2013, was 85 minutes long, while second session was held on the following day and was 120 minutes long.

During the first practice session, Juan Pablo Montoya, for the Earnhardt Ganassi Racing team, was quickest ahead of Kurt Busch in second and Austin Dillon in third. Paul Menard was scored fourth, and Kahne managed fifth. Joey Logano, Harvick, Martin Truex Jr., Kenseth, and Earnhardt Jr. rounded out the top ten quickest drivers in the session. In the final practice session for the race, Kurt Busch was the quickest of the forty-five drivers who participated. Kahne followed in second, ahead of Montoya and Johnson in third and fourth. Marcos Ambrose, who was twenty-second quickest in second practice, managed fifth. Kahne had the best ten–lap consecutive average with a speed of 182.419 miles per hour (293.575 km/h).

During qualifying, forty-five cars were entered, meaning two cars were bumped from the race because of NASCAR's qualifying procedure. Ryan Newman clinched his fiftieth career pole position, with a record speed of 187.531 miles per hour (301.802 km/h). After the qualifying session ended, Newman said, "I'll admit I was emotional, for me. Especially because it was the Brickyard and I hadn't won a pole here before, and I've won so many poles. It's been so long since I've won a pole people ask me if I've run out of fuel for the rockets." He was joined on the front row of the grid by Johnson. Edwards qualified third, Denny Hamlin took fourth, and Tony Stewart started fifth. Kurt Busch, Kahne, Montoya, Jeff Gordon, and Ambrose completed the first ten positions on the grid. The two drivers who failed to qualify for the race were Mike Bliss and Scott Speed.

== Results ==
=== Qualifying ===
Grid	No.	Driver	Team	Manufacturer	Time	Speed
1	39	Ryan Newman	Stewart–Haas Racing	Chevrolet	47.992	187.531
2	48	Jimmie Johnson	Hendrick Motorsports	Chevrolet	48.016	187.438
3	99	Carl Edwards	Roush Fenway Racing	Ford	48.088	187.157
4	11	Denny Hamlin	Joe Gibbs Racing	Toyota	48.097	187.122
5	14	Tony Stewart	Stewart–Haas Racing	Chevrolet	48.173	186.827
6	78	Kurt Busch	Furniture Row Racing	Chevrolet	48.200	186.722
7	5	Kasey Kahne	Hendrick Motorsports	Chevrolet	48.223	186.633
8	42	Juan Pablo Montoya	Earnhardt Ganassi Racing	Chevrolet	48.248	186.536
9	24	Jeff Gordon	Hendrick Motorsports	Chevrolet	48.264	186.474
10	9	Marcos Ambrose	Richard Petty Motorsports	Ford	48.314	186.281
11	22	Joey Logano	Penske Racing	Ford	48.399	185.954
12	2	Brad Keselowski	Penske Racing	Ford	48.408	185.920
13	20	Matt Kenseth	Joe Gibbs Racing	Toyota	48.442	185.789
14	51	A. J. Allmendinger	Phoenix Racing	Chevrolet	48.477	185.655
15	88	Dale Earnhardt Jr.	Hendrick Motorsports	Chevrolet	48.486	185.621
16	31	Jeff Burton	Richard Childress Racing	Chevrolet	48.531	185.448
17	15	Clint Bowyer	Michael Waltrip Racing	Toyota	48.534	185.437
18	1	Jamie McMurray	Earnhardt Ganassi Racing	Chevrolet	48.601	185.181
19	18	Kyle Busch	Joe Gibbs Racing	Toyota	48.622	185.101
20	33	Austin Dillon	Richard Childress Racing	Chevrolet	48.659	184.961
21	43	Aric Almirola	Richard Petty Motorsports	Ford	48.703	184.794
22	93	Travis Kvapil	BK Racing	Toyota	48.734	184.676
23	27	Paul Menard	Richard Childress Racing	Chevrolet	48.742	184.646
24	29	Kevin Harvick	Richard Childress Racing	Chevrolet	48.756	184.593
25	17	Ricky Stenhouse Jr.	Roush Fenway Racing	Ford	48.771	184.536
26	55	Mark Martin	Michael Waltrip Racing	Toyota	48.832	184.305
27	16	Greg Biffle	Roush Fenway Racing	Ford	48.901	184.045
28	21	Trevor Bayne	Wood Brothers Racing	Ford	48.938	183.906
29	40	Landon Cassill	Circle Sport	Chevrolet	48.962	183.816
30	13	Casey Mears	Germain Racing	Ford	48.979	183.752
31	83	David Reutimann	BK Racing	Toyota	49.092	183.329
32	35	Josh Wise	Front Row Motorsports	Ford	49.168	183.046
33	10	Danica Patrick	Stewart–Haas Racing	Chevrolet	49.197	182.938
34	47	Bobby Labonte	JTG Daugherty Racing	Toyota	49.227	182.826
35	98	Michael McDowell	Phil Parsons Racing	Ford	49.229	182.819
36	34	David Ragan	Front Row Motorsports	Ford	49.329	182.448
37	30	David Stremme	Swan Racing	Toyota	49.539	181.675
38	56	Martin Truex Jr.	Michael Waltrip Racing	Toyota	49.577	181.536
39	36	J. J. Yeley	Tommy Baldwin Racing	Chevrolet	49.658	181.240
40	87	Joe Nemechek	NEMCO-Jay Robinson Racing	Toyota	49.772	180.825
41	7	Dave Blaney	Tommy Baldwin Racing	Chevrolet	50.034	179.878
42	38	David Gilliland	Front Row Motorsports	Ford	50.126	179.548
43	32	Timmy Hill	FAS Lane Racing	Ford	50.344	178.770
Failed to Qualify
	19	Mike Bliss	Humphrey Smith Racing	Toyota	49.483	181.881
	95	Scott Speed	Leavine Family Racing	Ford	50.780	177.235

=== Race results ===
Pos	No.	Driver	Team	Manufacturer	Laps	Led	Points^{1}
1	39	Ryan Newman	Stewart–Haas Racing	Chevrolet	160	45	47
2	48	Jimmie Johnson	Hendrick Motorsports	Chevrolet	160	73	44
3	5	Kasey Kahne	Hendrick Motorsports	Chevrolet	160	0	41
4	14	Tony Stewart	Stewart–Haas Racing	Chevrolet	160	0	40
5	20	Matt Kenseth	Joe Gibbs Racing	Toyota	160	0	39
6	88	Dale Earnhardt Jr.	Hendrick Motorsports	Chevrolet	160	0	38
7	24	Jeff Gordon	Hendrick Motorsports	Chevrolet	160	11	38
8	22	Joey Logano	Penske Racing	Ford	160	11	37
9	42	Juan Pablo Montoya	Earnhardt Ganassi Racing	Chevrolet	160	1	36
10	18	Kyle Busch	Joe Gibbs Racing	Toyota	160	0	34
11	56	Martin Truex Jr.	Michael Waltrip Racing	Toyota	160	0	33
12	27	Paul Menard	Richard Childress Racing	Chevrolet	160	1	33
13	99	Carl Edwards	Roush Fenway Racing	Ford	160	1	32
14	78	Kurt Busch	Furniture Row Racing	Chevrolet	160	0	30
15	1	Jamie McMurray	Earnhardt Ganassi Racing	Chevrolet	160	5	30
16	9	Marcos Ambrose	Richard Petty Motorsports	Ford	160	0	28
17	43	Aric Almirola	Richard Petty Motorsports	Ford	160	0	27
18	11	Denny Hamlin	Joe Gibbs Racing	Toyota	160	4	27
19	29	Kevin Harvick	Richard Childress Racing	Chevrolet	160	2	26
20	15	Clint Bowyer	Michael Waltrip Racing	Toyota	160	1	25
21	2	Brad Keselowski	Penske Racing	Ford	160	5	24
22	51	A. J. Allmendinger	Phoenix Racing	Chevrolet	160	0	22
23	55	Mark Martin	Michael Waltrip Racing	Toyota	160	0	21
24	16	Greg Biffle	Roush Fenway Racing	Ford	159	0	20
25	17	Ricky Stenhouse Jr.	Roush Fenway Racing	Ford	159	0	19
26	33	Austin Dillon	Richard Childress Racing	Chevrolet	159	0	0^{[2]}
27	13	Casey Mears	Germain Racing	Ford	159	0	17
28	21	Trevor Bayne	Wood Brothers Racing	Ford	159	0	0^{[2]}
29	83	David Reutimann	BK Racing	Toyota	158	0	15
30	10	Danica Patrick	Stewart–Haas Racing	Chevrolet	158	0	14
31	93	Travis Kvapil	BK Racing	Toyota	158	0	13
32	98	Michael McDowell	Phil Parsons Racing	Ford	157	0	12
33	40	Landon Cassill	Circle Sport	Chevrolet	157	0	0^{[2]}
34	34	David Ragan	Front Row Motorsports	Ford	157	0	10
35	38	David Gilliland	Front Row Motorsports	Ford	157	0	9
36	47	Bobby Labonte	JTG Daugherty Racing	Toyota	157	0	8
37	7	Dave Blaney	Tommy Baldwin Racing	Chevrolet	156	0	7
38	35	Josh Wise	Front Row Motorsports	Ford	156	0	0^{[2]}
39	36	J. J. Yeley	Tommy Baldwin Racing	Chevrolet	156	0	5
40	30	David Stremme	Swan Racing	Toyota	151	0	4
41	87	Joe Nemechek	NEMCO-Jay Robinson Racing	Toyota	146	0	0^{[2]}
42	32	Timmy Hill	FAS Lane Racing	Ford	121	0	2
43	31	Jeff Burton	Richard Childress Racing	Chevrolet	110	0	1

==== Notes ====
1. ^1 Points include 3 Chase for the Sprint Cup points for winning, 1 point for leading a lap, and 1 point for most laps led.
2. ^{a} ^{b} ^{c} ^{d} ^{e} Ineligible for driver's championship points.

== Standings after the race ==
Drivers' Championship standings

Pos	Driver	Points
1	Jimmie Johnson	740
2	Clint Bowyer	665 (–75)
3	Carl Edwards	655 (–85)
4	Kevin Harvick	648 (–92)
5	Dale Earnhardt Jr.	616 (–124)

Manufacturers' Championship standings

Pos	Manufacturer	Points
1	Chevrolet	143
2	Toyota	131 (–12)
3	Ford	99 (–44)

- Note: Only the first twelve positions are included for the driver standings.

Previous race: 2013 Camping World RV Sales 301	Sprint Cup Series; 2013 season	Next race: 2013 Gobowling.com 400
