= Brad Means =

American racing driver and team owner

- Born: May 12, 1976 (age 50); Forest City, North Carolina, U.S.

ARCA Menards Series East career
- 1 race run over 1 year
- Best finish: 58th (2014)
- First race: 2014 JEGS 150 (Columbus)
Wins	Top tens	Poles
0	0	0
- Statistics up to date as of October 7, 2025.

Brad Means (born May 12, 1976) is an American professional stock car racing driver, crew chief, and team owner. He is the son of former NASCAR driver and team owner Jimmy Means.

Means is the former team owner of DCC Racing, which ran in the NASCAR Camping World Truck Series in 2021. He has also previously worked as a crew chief for Rev Racing in the ARCA Menards Series.

Means has previously competed in the NASCAR K&N Pro Series East, the CARS Tour, and the ARA Late Model Stock All-Star Tour.

== Motorsports results ==
=== NASCAR ===
(key) (Bold - Pole position awarded by qualifying time. Italics - Pole position earned by points standings or practice time. * – Most laps led.)

==== Craftsman Truck Series ====
NASCAR Craftsman Truck Series results
Year	Team	No.	Make	1	2	3	4	5	6	7	8	9	10	11	12	13	14	15	16	17	18	19	20	21	22	23	24	25	NCTSC	Pts	Ref
1996	N/A	91	Ford	HOM	PHO	POR	EVG	TUS	CNS	HPT	BRI	NZH	MLW	LVL	I70	IRP	FLM	GLN	NSV	RCH	NHA	MAR	NWS; DNQ	SON	MMR	PHO	LVS		139th	16	
1999	Means Racing	92	Ford	HOM	PHO	EVG	MMR	MAR	MEM	PPR	I70	BRI	TEX	PIR	GLN	MLW	NSV	NZH	MCH	NHA	IRP; DNQ	GTY	HPT	RCH	LVS	LVL	TEX	CAL	121st	46	

==== K&N Pro Series East ====
NASCAR K&N Pro Series East results
Year	Team	No.	Make	1	2	3	4	5	6	7	8	9	10	11	12	13	14	15	16	NKNPSEC	Pts	Ref
2014	Ric Bruenger	54	Chevy	NSM	DAY	BRI	GRE	RCH	IOW	BGS	FIF	LGY	NHA	COL; 17	IOW	GLN	VIR	GRE	DOV	58th	27	

=== CARS Late Model Stock Car Tour ===
(key) (Bold – Pole position awarded by qualifying time. Italics – Pole position earned by points standings or practice time. * – Most laps led. ** – All laps led.)

CARS Late Model Stock Car Tour results
Year	Team	No.	Make	1	2	3	4	5	6	7	8	9	10	11	12	13	14	15	CLMSCTC	Pts	Ref
2025	Dwight Huffman Racing	92	N/A	AAS	WCS	CDL	OCS	ACE	NWS	LGY	DOM	CRW	HCY	AND	FLC	SBO	TCM; 18	NWS	76th	24	
