= Trevor Collins =

South African cricketer (born 1929)

Personal information
- Full name: Trevor Llewellyn Collins
- Born: 9 July 1929; Queenstown, South Africa
- Died: 3 July 2024 (aged 94)
- Batting: Right-handed
- Bowling: Left-arm medium

Domestic team information
- Years: Team
- 1946/47–1947/48: Border
- Source: Cricinfo, 6 December 2020

Trevor Llewellyn Collins (9 July 1929 – 3 July 2024) was a South African cricketer. He played in six first-class matches for Border in 1946/47 and 1947/48.

== See also ==
- List of Border representative cricketers
