= 2000 Pop Secret Microwave Popcorn 400 =

31st race of the 2000 NASCAR Winston Cup Series

Race details
- Race 31 of 34 in the 2000 NASCAR Winston Cup Series
- The 2000 Pop Secret Microwave Popcorn 400 program cover, featuring Bobby Labonte and Dale Earnhardt.
- Date: October 22, 2000
- Official name: 36th Annual Pop Secret Microwave Popcorn 400
- Location: Rockingham, North Carolina, North Carolina Speedway
- Course: Permanent racing facility
- Course length: 1.017 miles (1.636 km)
- Distance: 393 laps, 399.681 mi (643.224 km)
- Average speed: 110.418 miles per hour (177.701 km/h)

Pole position
Driver	Jeremy Mayfield	Penske-Kranefuss Racing
- Time: 23.269

Most laps led
Driver	Jeremy Mayfield	Penske-Kranefuss Racing
- Laps: 169

Winner
No. 88	Dale Jarrett	Robert Yates Racing

Television in the United States
- Network: TNN
- Announcers: Eli Gold, Buddy Baker, Dick Berggren

Radio in the United States
- Radio: Motor Racing Network

The 2000 Pop Secret Microwave Popcorn 400 was the 31st stock car race of the 2000 NASCAR Winston Cup Series and the 36th iteration of the event. The race was held on Sunday, October 22, 2000, in Rockingham, North Carolina, at North Carolina Speedway, a 1.017 miles (1.637 km) permanent high-banked racetrack. The race took the scheduled 393 laps to complete. In the final 43 laps of the race, Robert Yates Racing driver Dale Jarrett would manage to make a pass for the lead and defend the field to take his 24th career NASCAR Winston Cup Series victory and his second and final victory of the season. To fill out the top 3, Hendrick Motorsports driver Jeff Gordon and Robert Yates Racing driver Ricky Rudd would finish second and third, respectively.

== Background ==
The layout of North Carolina Speedway, the venue where the race was held.

North Carolina Speedway was opened as a flat, one-mile oval on October 31, 1965. In 1969, the track was extensively reconfigured to a high-banked, D-shaped oval just over one mile in length. In 1997, North Carolina Motor Speedway merged with Penske Motorsports, and was renamed North Carolina Speedway. Shortly thereafter, the infield was reconfigured, and competition on the infield road course, mostly by the SCCA, was discontinued. Currently, the track is home to the Fast Track High Performance Driving School.

=== Entry list ===
- (R) denotes rookie driver.

#	Driver	Team	Make
1	Steve Park	Dale Earnhardt, Inc.	Chevrolet
01	Ted Musgrave	Team SABCO	Chevrolet
2	Rusty Wallace	Penske-Kranefuss Racing	Ford
3	Dale Earnhardt	Richard Childress Racing	Chevrolet
4	Bobby Hamilton	Morgan–McClure Motorsports	Chevrolet
5	Terry Labonte	Hendrick Motorsports	Chevrolet
6	Mark Martin	Roush Racing	Ford
7	Michael Waltrip	Mattei Motorsports	Chevrolet
8	Dale Earnhardt Jr. (R)	Dale Earnhardt, Inc.	Chevrolet
9	Stacy Compton (R)	Melling Racing	Ford
10	Johnny Benson Jr.	Tyler Jet Motorsports	Pontiac
11	Brett Bodine	Brett Bodine Racing	Ford
12	Jeremy Mayfield	Penske-Kranefuss Racing	Ford
13	Robby Gordon	Team Menard	Ford
14	Rick Mast	A. J. Foyt Enterprises	Pontiac
16	Kevin Lepage	Roush Racing	Ford
17	Matt Kenseth (R)	Roush Racing	Ford
18	Bobby Labonte	Joe Gibbs Racing	Pontiac
20	Tony Stewart	Joe Gibbs Racing	Pontiac
21	Elliott Sadler	Wood Brothers Racing	Ford
22	Ward Burton	Bill Davis Racing	Pontiac
24	Jeff Gordon	Hendrick Motorsports	Chevrolet
25	Jerry Nadeau	Hendrick Motorsports	Chevrolet
26	Jimmy Spencer	Haas-Carter Motorsports	Ford
27	Mike Bliss (R)	Eel River Racing	Pontiac
28	Ricky Rudd	Robert Yates Racing	Ford
31	Mike Skinner	Richard Childress Racing	Chevrolet
32	Scott Pruett (R)	PPI Motorsports	Ford
33	Joe Nemechek	Andy Petree Racing	Chevrolet
36	Ken Schrader	MB2 Motorsports	Pontiac
40	Sterling Marlin	Team SABCO	Chevrolet
43	John Andretti	Petty Enterprises	Pontiac
44	Steve Grissom	Petty Enterprises	Pontiac
50	Ricky Craven	Midwest Transit Racing	Chevrolet
55	Kenny Wallace	Andy Petree Racing	Chevrolet
60	Rich Bickle	Joe Bessey Racing	Chevrolet
66	Darrell Waltrip	Haas-Carter Motorsports	Ford
71	Dave Marcis	Marcis Auto Racing	Chevrolet
75	Wally Dallenbach Jr.	Galaxy Motorsports	Ford
77	Robert Pressley	Jasper Motorsports	Ford
85	Carl Long	Mansion Motorsports	Ford
88	Dale Jarrett	Robert Yates Racing	Ford
90	Hut Stricklin	Donlavey Racing	Ford
93	Dave Blaney (R)	Bill Davis Racing	Pontiac
94	Bill Elliott	Bill Elliott Racing	Ford
96	Andy Houston	PPI Motorsports	Ford
97	Kurt Busch	Roush Racing	Ford
99	Jeff Burton	Roush Racing	Ford

== Practice ==
=== First practice ===
The first practice session was held on Friday, October 20, at 10:30 AM EST. The session would last for one hour and 45 minutes. Jeremy Mayfield, driving for Penske-Kranefuss Racing, would set the fastest time in the session, with a lap of 23.223 and an average speed of 157.654 mph (253.720 km/h).

Pos.	#	Driver	Team	Make	Time	Speed
1	12	Jeremy Mayfield	Penske-Kranefuss Racing	Ford	23.223	157.654
2	99	Jeff Burton	Roush Racing	Ford	23.335	156.897
3	24	Jeff Gordon	Hendrick Motorsports	Chevrolet	23.357	156.750
Full first practice results

=== Second practice ===
The second practice session was held on Saturday, October 21, at 8:00 AM EST. The session would last for one hour and 30 minutes. Tony Stewart, driving for Joe Gibbs Racing, would set the fastest time in the session, with a lap of 24.284 and an average speed of 150.766 mph (242.634 km/h).

Pos.	#	Driver	Team	Make	Time	Speed
1	20	Tony Stewart	Joe Gibbs Racing	Pontiac	24.284	150.766
2	99	Jeff Burton	Roush Racing	Ford	24.302	150.654
3	27	Mike Bliss (R)	Eel River Racing	Pontiac	24.314	150.580
Full second practice results

=== Final practice ===
The final practice session was held on Saturday, October 21. The session would last for one hour. Kurt Busch, driving for Roush Racing, would set the fastest time in the session, with a lap of 24.275 and an average speed of 150.822 mph (242.724 km/h).

Pos.	#	Driver	Team	Make	Time	Speed
1	97	Kurt Busch	Roush Racing	Ford	24.275	150.822
2	22	Ward Burton	Bill Davis Racing	Pontiac	24.343	150.401
3	5	Terry Labonte	Hendrick Motorsports	Chevrolet	24.368	150.246
Full Happy Hour practice results

== Qualifying ==
Qualifying was split into two rounds. The first round was held on Friday, October 20, at 2:00 PM EST. Each driver would have one lap to set a time. During the first round, the top 25 drivers in the round would be guaranteed a starting spot in the race. If a driver was not able to guarantee a spot in the first round, they had the option to scrub their time from the first round and try and run a faster lap time in a second round qualifying run, held on Saturday, October 21, at 9:30 AM EST. As with the first round, each driver would have one lap to set a time. Positions 26-36 would be decided on time, while positions 37-43 would be based on provisionals. Six spots are awarded by the use of provisionals based on owner's points. The seventh is awarded to a past champion who has not otherwise qualified for the race. If no past champion needs the provisional, the next team in the owner points will be awarded a provisional.

Jeremy Mayfield, driving for Penske-Kranefuss Racing, would win the pole, setting a time of 23.269 and an average speed of 157.342 miles per hour (253.217 km/h).

Five drivers would fail to qualify: Ted Musgrave, Rich Bickle, Steve Grissom, Hut Stricklin, and Stacy Compton.

=== Full qualifying results ===
Pos.	#	Driver	Team	Make	Time	Speed
1	12	Jeremy Mayfield	Penske-Kranefuss Racing	Ford	23.269	157.342
2	18	Bobby Labonte	Joe Gibbs Racing	Pontiac	23.283	157.248
3	24	Jeff Gordon	Hendrick Motorsports	Chevrolet	23.364	156.703
4	94	Bill Elliott	Bill Elliott Racing	Ford	23.364	156.703
5	6	Mark Martin	Roush Racing	Ford	23.399	156.468
6	99	Jeff Burton	Roush Racing	Ford	23.412	156.381
7	33	Joe Nemechek	Andy Petree Racing	Chevrolet	23.423	156.308
8	31	Mike Skinner	Richard Childress Racing	Chevrolet	23.434	156.235
9	22	Ward Burton	Bill Davis Racing	Pontiac	23.441	156.188
10	55	Kenny Wallace	Andy Petree Racing	Chevrolet	23.449	156.135
11	14	Rick Mast	A. J. Foyt Enterprises	Pontiac	23.449	156.135
12	25	Jerry Nadeau	Hendrick Motorsports	Chevrolet	23.460	156.061
13	28	Ricky Rudd	Robert Yates Racing	Ford	23.469	156.002
14	10	Johnny Benson Jr.	Tyler Jet Motorsports	Pontiac	23.472	155.982
15	2	Rusty Wallace	Penske-Kranefuss Racing	Ford	23.473	155.975
16	16	Kevin Lepage	Roush Racing	Ford	23.498	155.809
17	1	Steve Park	Dale Earnhardt, Inc.	Chevrolet	23.511	155.723
18	20	Tony Stewart	Joe Gibbs Racing	Pontiac	23.516	155.690
19	36	Ken Schrader	MB2 Motorsports	Pontiac	23.538	155.544
20	7	Michael Waltrip	Mattei Motorsports	Chevrolet	23.557	155.419
21	88	Dale Jarrett	Robert Yates Racing	Ford	23.565	155.366
22	93	Dave Blaney (R)	Bill Davis Racing	Pontiac	23.573	155.313
23	40	Sterling Marlin	Team SABCO	Chevrolet	23.590	155.201
24	97	Kurt Busch	Roush Racing	Ford	23.592	155.188
25	11	Brett Bodine	Brett Bodine Racing	Ford	23.592	155.188
26	77	Robert Pressley	Jasper Motorsports	Ford	23.596	155.162
27	3	Dale Earnhardt	Richard Childress Racing	Chevrolet	23.607	155.090
28	17	Matt Kenseth (R)	Roush Racing	Ford	23.640	154.873
29	50	Ricky Craven	Midwest Transit Racing	Chevrolet	23.659	154.749
30	96	Andy Houston	PPI Motorsports	Ford	23.679	154.618
31	66	Darrell Waltrip	Haas-Carter Motorsports	Ford	23.693	154.527
32	5	Terry Labonte	Hendrick Motorsports	Chevrolet	23.695	154.514
33	75	Wally Dallenbach Jr.	Galaxy Motorsports	Ford	23.711	154.409
34	26	Jimmy Spencer	Haas-Carter Motorsports	Ford	23.713	154.396
35	4	Bobby Hamilton	Morgan–McClure Motorsports	Chevrolet	23.720	154.351
36	27	Mike Bliss (R)	Eel River Racing	Pontiac	23.727	154.305
Provisionals
37	8	Dale Earnhardt Jr. (R)	Dale Earnhardt, Inc.	Chevrolet	23.890	153.252
38	43	John Andretti	Petty Enterprises	Pontiac	23.762	154.078
39	21	Elliott Sadler	Wood Brothers Racing	Ford	23.766	154.052
40	32	Scott Pruett (R)	PPI Motorsports	Ford	23.746	154.182
41	13	Robby Gordon	Team Menard	Ford	23.785	153.929
42	71	Dave Marcis	Marcis Auto Racing	Chevrolet	24.120	151.791
43	85	Carl Long	Mansion Motorsports	Ford	24.120	151.791
Failed to qualify
44	01	Ted Musgrave	Team SABCO	Chevrolet	23.758	154.104
45	60	Rich Bickle	Joe Bessey Racing	Chevrolet	23.879	153.323
46	44	Steve Grissom	Petty Enterprises	Pontiac	24.062	152.157
47	90	Hut Stricklin	Donlavey Racing	Ford	24.451	149.736
48	9	Stacy Compton (R)	Melling Racing	Ford	24.454	149.718
Official first round qualifying results
Official starting lineup

== Race results ==
Fin	St	#	Driver	Team	Make	Laps	Led	Status	Pts	Winnings
1	21	88	Dale Jarrett	Robert Yates Racing	Ford	393	43	running	180	$125,850
2	3	24	Jeff Gordon	Hendrick Motorsports	Chevrolet	393	4	running	175	$81,300
3	13	28	Ricky Rudd	Robert Yates Racing	Ford	393	13	running	170	$65,300
4	6	99	Jeff Burton	Roush Racing	Ford	393	115	running	170	$62,925
5	15	2	Rusty Wallace	Penske-Kranefuss Racing	Ford	393	43	running	160	$50,875
6	17	1	Steve Park	Dale Earnhardt, Inc.	Chevrolet	393	2	running	155	$47,050
7	18	20	Tony Stewart	Joe Gibbs Racing	Pontiac	393	0	running	146	$53,200
8	9	22	Ward Burton	Bill Davis Racing	Pontiac	393	0	running	142	$50,900
9	35	4	Bobby Hamilton	Morgan–McClure Motorsports	Chevrolet	393	0	running	138	$45,600
10	7	33	Joe Nemechek	Andy Petree Racing	Chevrolet	393	0	running	134	$49,500
11	14	10	Johnny Benson Jr.	Tyler Jet Motorsports	Pontiac	393	0	running	130	$39,550
12	26	77	Robert Pressley	Jasper Motorsports	Ford	393	2	running	132	$32,725
13	11	14	Rick Mast	A. J. Foyt Enterprises	Pontiac	393	0	running	124	$29,625
14	8	31	Mike Skinner	Richard Childress Racing	Chevrolet	393	0	running	121	$40,025
15	29	50	Ricky Craven	Midwest Transit Racing	Chevrolet	393	0	running	118	$30,125
16	4	94	Bill Elliott	Bill Elliott Racing	Ford	393	0	running	115	$39,325
17	27	3	Dale Earnhardt	Richard Childress Racing	Chevrolet	393	1	running	117	$46,625
18	19	36	Ken Schrader	MB2 Motorsports	Pontiac	393	0	running	109	$30,525
19	39	21	Elliott Sadler	Wood Brothers Racing	Ford	393	0	running	106	$42,725
20	2	18	Bobby Labonte	Joe Gibbs Racing	Pontiac	392	1	running	108	$50,252
21	36	27	Mike Bliss (R)	Eel River Racing	Pontiac	392	0	running	100	$27,350
22	33	75	Wally Dallenbach Jr.	Galaxy Motorsports	Ford	392	0	running	97	$29,175
23	38	43	John Andretti	Petty Enterprises	Pontiac	392	0	running	94	$43,375
24	24	97	Kurt Busch	Roush Racing	Ford	392	0	running	91	$36,675
25	28	17	Matt Kenseth (R)	Roush Racing	Ford	391	0	running	88	$36,775
26	25	11	Brett Bodine	Brett Bodine Racing	Ford	391	0	running	85	$24,775
27	12	25	Jerry Nadeau	Hendrick Motorsports	Chevrolet	390	0	running	82	$35,875
28	30	96	Andy Houston	PPI Motorsports	Ford	389	0	running	79	$24,375
29	1	12	Jeremy Mayfield	Penske-Kranefuss Racing	Ford	387	169	running	86	$51,900
30	40	32	Scott Pruett (R)	PPI Motorsports	Ford	386	0	running	73	$24,575
31	42	71	Dave Marcis	Marcis Auto Racing	Chevrolet	370	0	engine	70	$23,925
32	43	85	Carl Long	Mansion Motorsports	Ford	341	0	running	67	$26,900
33	23	40	Sterling Marlin	Team SABCO	Chevrolet	328	0	running	64	$34,675
34	37	8	Dale Earnhardt Jr. (R)	Dale Earnhardt, Inc.	Chevrolet	301	0	crash	61	$33,550
35	20	7	Michael Waltrip	Mattei Motorsports	Chevrolet	295	0	engine	58	$34,425
36	16	16	Kevin Lepage	Roush Racing	Ford	253	0	crash	55	$33,875
37	31	66	Darrell Waltrip	Haas-Carter Motorsports	Ford	193	0	engine	52	$23,325
38	32	5	Terry Labonte	Hendrick Motorsports	Chevrolet	191	0	crash	49	$41,275
39	34	26	Jimmy Spencer	Haas-Carter Motorsports	Ford	174	0	crash	46	$31,225
40	5	6	Mark Martin	Roush Racing	Ford	174	0	crash	43	$41,150
41	41	13	Robby Gordon	Team Menard	Ford	154	0	crash	40	$23,100
42	22	93	Dave Blaney (R)	Bill Davis Racing	Pontiac	115	0	engine	37	$23,050
43	10	55	Kenny Wallace	Andy Petree Racing	Chevrolet	14	0	engine	34	$30,994
Official race results

Previous race: 2000 Winston 500	NASCAR Winston Cup Series; 2000 season	Next race: 2000 Checker Auto Parts/Dura Lube 500k
