= List of NASCAR race wins by Tony Stewart =

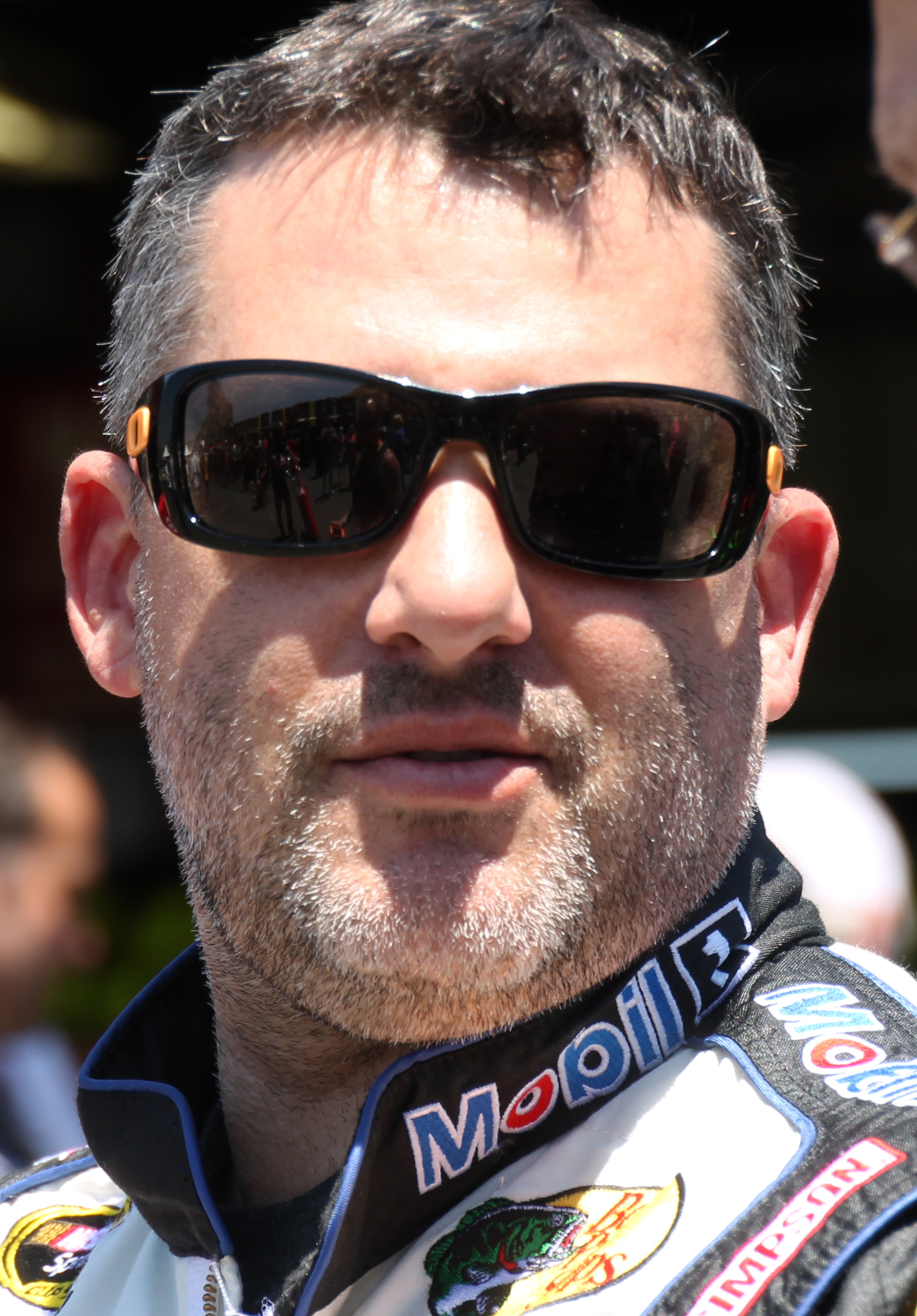
Tony Stewart won 62 NASCAR races and three Cup Series champions

Tony Stewart is an American semi-retired professional race car driver who won three Drivers' Championships in the NASCAR Cup Series. He made his NASCAR debut in the Busch Series with the Ranier-Walsh Racing team in 1996 before moving to the Labonte Motorsports squad for part of the 1997 season. Following this, Stewart moved to the Joe Gibbs Racing (JGR) team for the remainder of the season and 1998. Stewart moved to the higher-tier Cup Series with JGR in 1999, winning that season's Rookie of the Year for finishing fourth in the Drivers' Championship with three race victories. He won six races in the 2000 season, more than any other driver that year. This was followed by another three race wins each in 2001 and his first championship winning season in 2002 with three more race victories. Stewart won twice each in the 2003 and 2004 seasons, and took his second drivers' championship with five victories in 2005.

The following year, he won five more races despite not qualifying for the season-ending Chase for the Nextel Cup. Stewart's final victory for JGR came at the 2008 AMP Energy 500 at Talladega Superspeedway. He joined Stewart–Haas Racing (SHR) as a driver-owner in 2009. Stewart finished sixth in the final points standings with four victories, but fell to seventh with two wins in 2010. In the 2011 season, he won five races in the Chase for the Sprint Cup to win his third drivers' championship on a tiebreak with Roush Fenway Racing driver Carl Edwards, who won once. The achievement made Stewart the first Cup Series driver-owner champion since Alan Kulwicki in 1992. This was followed by three victories in 2012 and one in 2013. The 2014 and 2015 seasons were the only two in the Cup Series in which Stewart did not register a race victory. His final win in NASCAR came at the 16th round of the 2016 season in the Toyota/Save Mart 350 at Sonoma Raceway.

In all, Stewart won a total of 62 NASCAR races, 49 of which were in the Cup Series. Stewart also won 11 races in the Busch Series (later Nationwide Series) and 2 in the Craftsman Truck Series. The majority of his race victories were for JGR with 38; he also won 16 races with SHR, 4 for Kevin Harvick Incorporated (KHI), 2 for Andy Petree Racing and 1 each for Hendrick Motorsports and Richard Childress Racing. As of 2020, Stewart ranks 15th on the all-time in the Cup Series wins list with 49, and 15th overall in all 3 of NASCAR's national series with 62. His most successful circuit was Daytona International Speedway, where he won 11 times. Stewart's largest margin of victory was at the 2006 Banquet 400 at Kansas Speedway, a race where he finished 12.422 ahead of the second-placed Casey Mears of Chip Ganassi Racing, and the smallest margin of victory was at the 2011 DRIVE4COPD 300 at Daytona, where he beat his KHI teammate Clint Bowyer by 0.007 seconds.

== NASCAR ==
=== Cup Series ===
In the NASCAR Cup Series, which was sponsored by Winston, Nextel, and Sprint during Stewart's career, Stewart, the 1999 Rookie of the Year and three-time Cup Series champion, won 49 races. Throughout his career, he won at 21 out of 24 tracks at which he raced on, leaving Darlington Raceway, Kentucky Speedway, and Rockingham Speedway the three circuits where he failed to win. As of the end of the 2019 Monster Energy NASCAR Cup Series, Stewart's 49 wins rank 15th of all time.

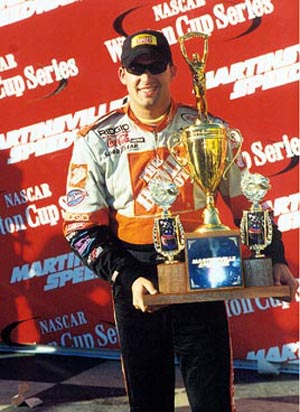
Stewart holding the trophy after his victory at the 2000 NAPA Autocare 500

Stewart qualifying for the 2005 Dodge/Save Mart 350

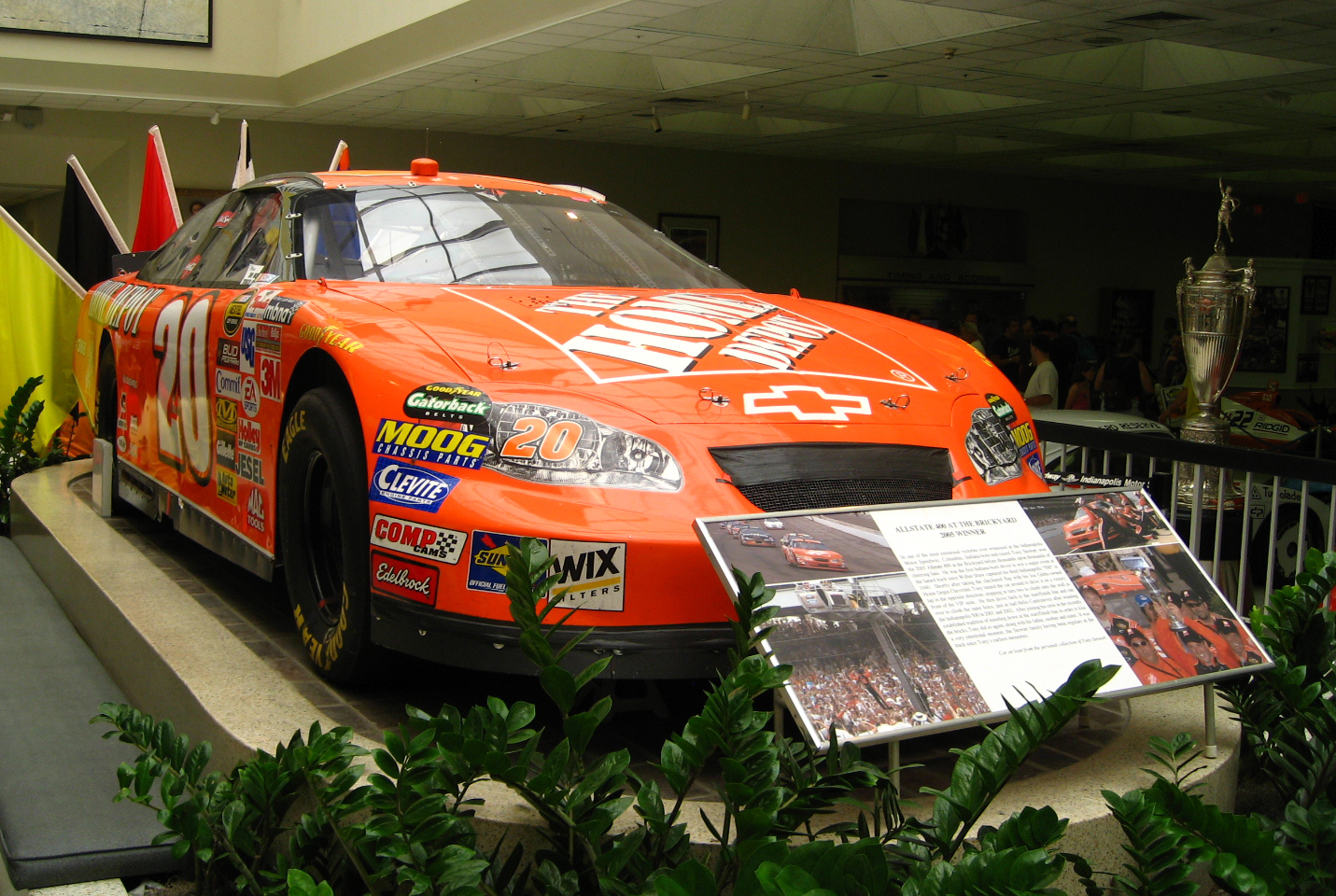
Stewart's car from his victory at the 2005 Allstate 400 at the Brickyard on display at the Indianapolis Motor Speedway museum

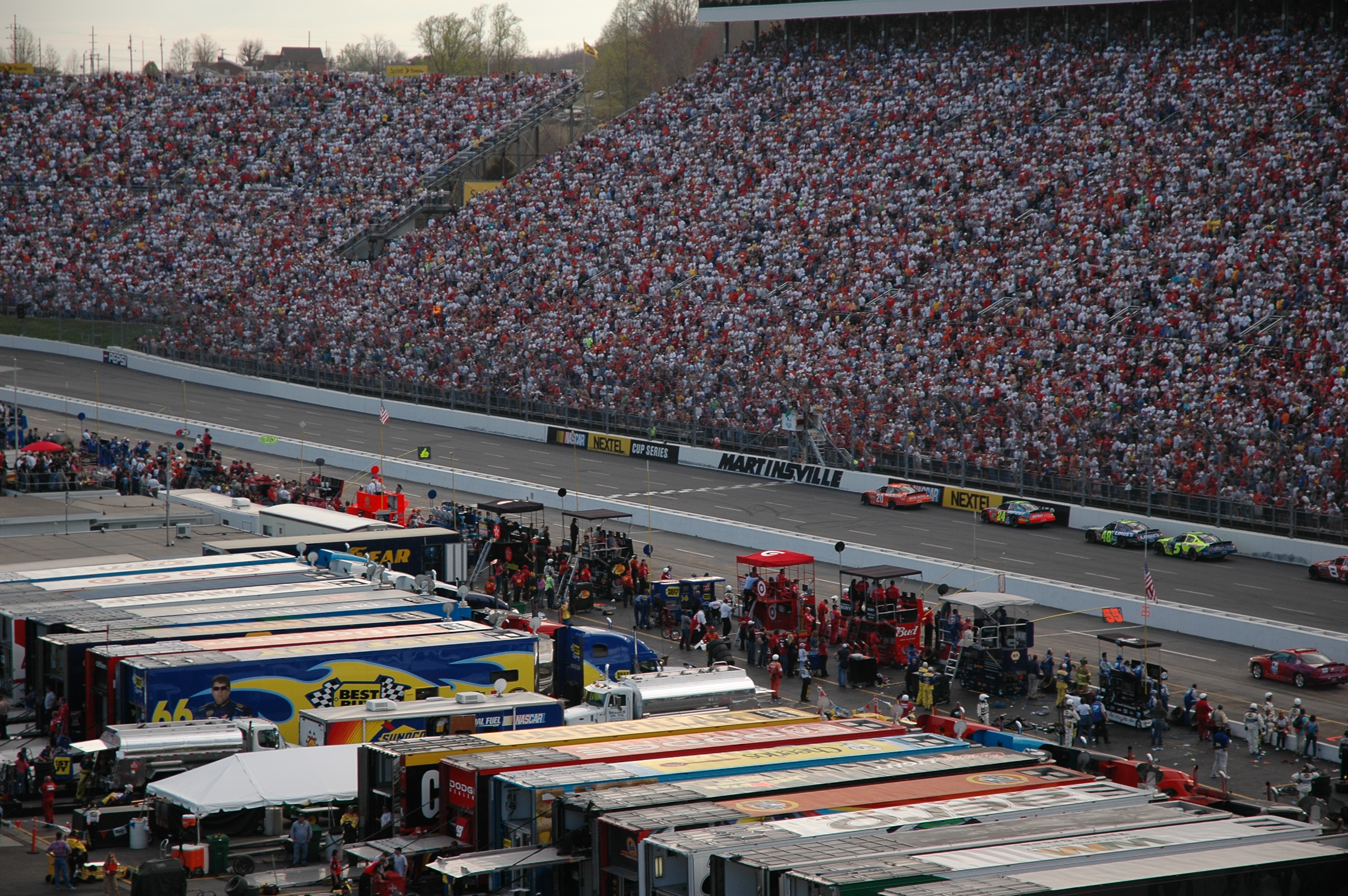
Stewart driving towards the start-finish line en route to victory at the 2006 DirecTV 500

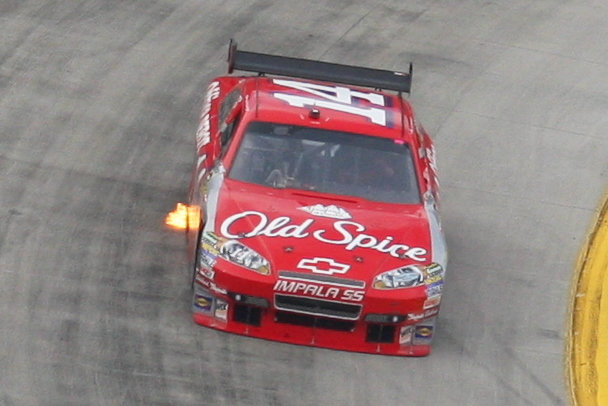
Stewart driving for Stewart–Haas Racing at the 2009 TUMS Fast Relief 500

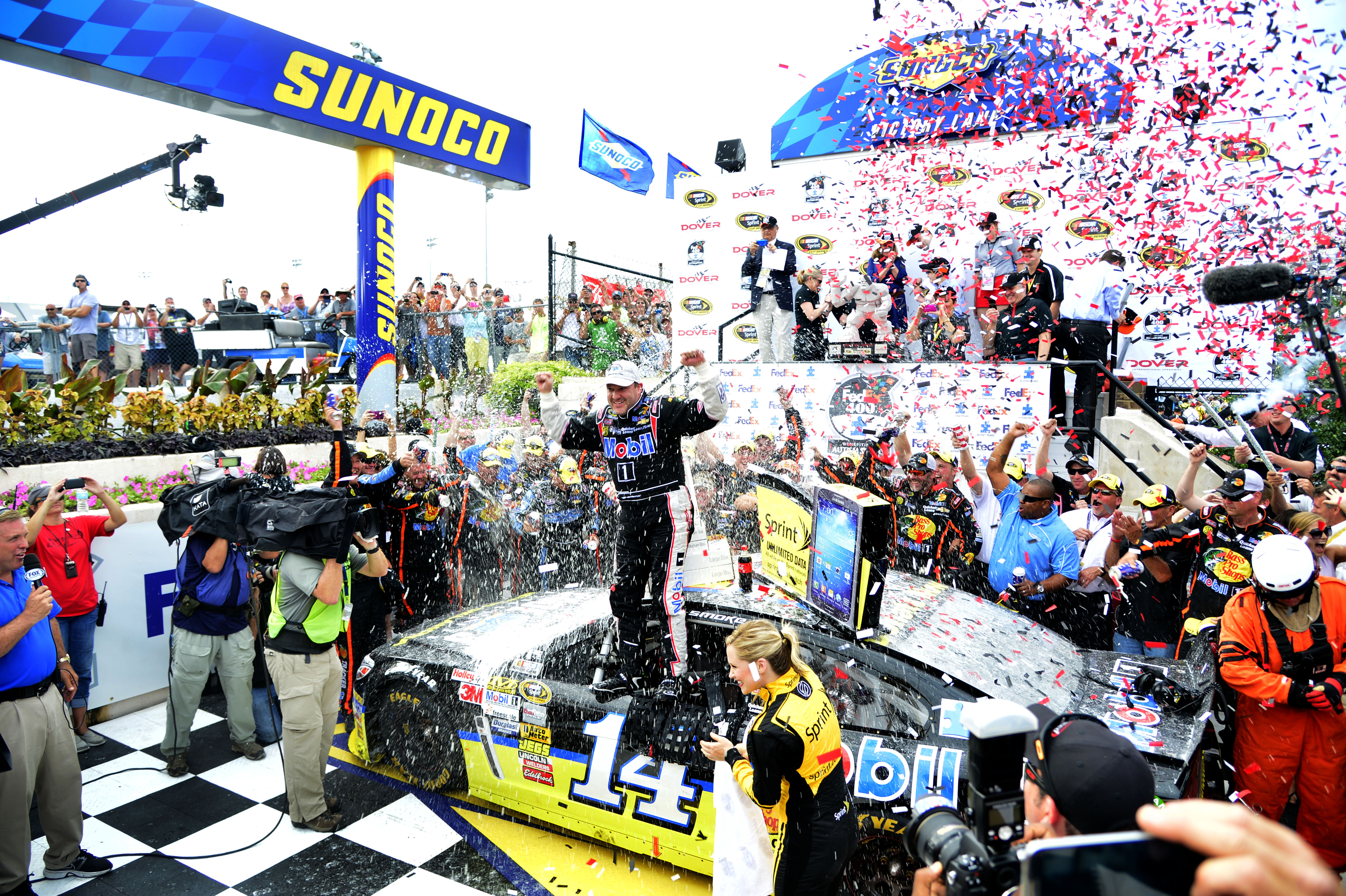
Stewart celebrating his win of the 2013 FedEx 400

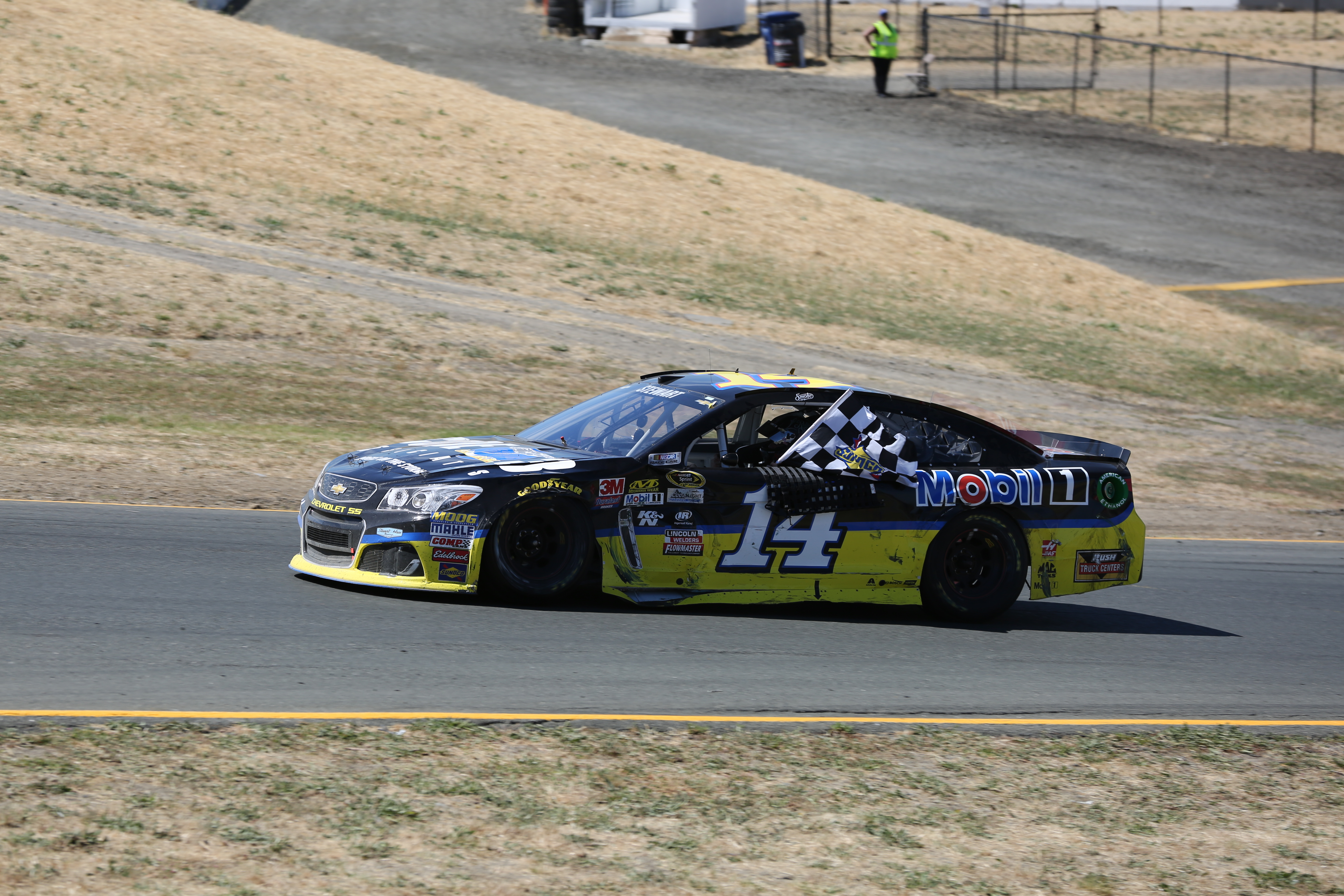
Stewart holding the checkered flag from his final NASCAR victory at the 2016 Toyota/Save Mart 350

Key:

- No. – Victory number; for example, "1" signifies Stewart's first race win.
- Race – Race number in Stewart's NASCAR Cup/Nationwide/Truck Series career; for example "92" signifies Stewart's 92nd race in a NASCAR division.
- Grid – The position on the grid from which Stewart started the race.
- Margin – Margin of victory, given in the format of seconds.milliseconds; caution indicates the race was ended by a yellow flag for an accident or inclement weather
- † – Driver's Championship winning season.

Sprint Cup Series victories
No.	Race	Date	Season	Race	Track	Grid	Margin	Team	Car	Ref
1	25	September 11, 1999	1999	Exide NASCAR Select Batteries 400	Richmond International Raceway	2	1.115	Joe Gibbs Racing	Pontiac	
2	32	November 7, 1999	1999	Checker Auto Parts/Dura Lube 500	Phoenix International Raceway	11	2.081	Joe Gibbs Racing	Pontiac	
3	33	November 14, 1999	1999	Pennzoil 400	Homestead-Miami Speedway	7	5.289	Joe Gibbs Racing	Pontiac	
4	47	June 4, 2000	2000	MBNA Platinum 400	Dover Downs International Speedway	16	1.215	Joe Gibbs Racing	Pontiac	
5	48	June 11, 2000	2000	Kmart 400	Michigan International Speedway	28	Caution	Joe Gibbs Racing	Pontiac	
6	52	July 9, 2000	2000	thatlook.com 300	New Hampshire International Speedway	6	Caution	Joe Gibbs Racing	Pontiac	
7	61	September 24, 2000	2000	MBNA.com 400	Dover Downs International Speedway	27	6.752	Joe Gibbs Racing	Pontiac	
8	62	October 1, 2000	2000	NAPA Autocare 500	Martinsville Speedway	1	0.672	Joe Gibbs Racing	Pontiac	
9	67	November 12, 2000	2000	Pennzoil 400	Homestead-Miami Speedway	13	4.561	Joe Gibbs Racing	Pontiac	
10	79	May 5, 2001	2001	Pontiac Excitement 400	Richmond International Raceway	7	0.372	Joe Gibbs Racing	Pontiac	
11	84	June 24, 2001	2001	Dodge/Save Mart 350	Sears Point Raceway	3	1.746	Joe Gibbs Racing	Pontiac	
12	92	August 25, 2001	2001	Sharpie 500	Bristol Motor Speedway	18	0.487	Joe Gibbs Racing	Pontiac	
13	108	March 10, 2002	2002†	MBNA America 500	Atlanta Motor Speedway	9	0.376	Joe Gibbs Racing	Pontiac	
14	115	May 4–May 5, 2002	2002†	Pontiac Excitement 400	Richmond International Raceway	3	1.484	Joe Gibbs Racing	Pontiac	
15	126	August 11, 2002	2002†	Sirius Satellite Radio at the Glen	Watkins Glen International	3	1.636	Joe Gibbs Racing	Pontiac	
16	154	June 8, 2003	2003	Pocono 500	Pocono Raceway	4	Caution	Joe Gibbs Racing	Chevrolet	
17	171	October 11, 2003	2003	UAW-GM Quality 500	Lowe's Motor Speedway	6	0.608	Joe Gibbs Racing	Chevrolet	
18	194	July 11, 2004	2004	Tropicana 400	Chicagoland Speedway	10	2.925	Joe Gibbs Racing	Chevrolet	
19	198	August 15, 2004	2004	Sirius at the Glen	Watkins Glen International	4	1.517	Joe Gibbs Racing	Chevrolet	
20	228	June 26, 2005	2005†	Dodge/Save Mart 350	Infineon Raceway	7	2.266	Joe Gibbs Racing	Chevrolet	
21	229	July 2–July 3, 2005	2005†	Pepsi 400	Daytona International Speedway	1	0.171	Joe Gibbs Racing	Chevrolet	
22	231	July 17, 2005	2005†	New England 300	New Hampshire International Speedway	13	0.851	Joe Gibbs Racing	Chevrolet	
23	233	August 7, 2005	2005†	Allstate 400 at the Brickyard	Indianapolis Motor Speedway	22	0.794	Joe Gibbs Racing	Chevrolet	
24	234	August 14, 2005	2005†	Sirius Satellite Radio at the Glen	Watkins Glen International	1	1.927	Joe Gibbs Racing	Chevrolet	
25	254	April 2, 2006	2006	DirecTV 500	Martinsville Speedway	3	1.083	Joe Gibbs Racing	Chevrolet	
26	264	July 1, 2006	2006	Pepsi 400	Daytona International Speedway	2	Caution	Joe Gibbs Racing	Chevrolet	
27	276	October 1, 2006	2006	Banquet 400	Kansas Speedway	21	12.422	Joe Gibbs Racing	Chevrolet	
28	280	October 29, 2006	2006	Bass Pro Shops MBNA 500	Atlanta Motor Speedway	11	1.195	Joe Gibbs Racing	Chevrolet	
29	281	November 5, 2006	2006	Dickies 500	Texas Motor Speedway	8	0.272	Joe Gibbs Racing	Chevrolet	
30	302	July 15, 2007	2007	USG Sheetrock 400	Chicagoland Speedway	19	1.727	Joe Gibbs Racing	Chevrolet	
31	303	July 29, 2007	2007	Allstate 400 at the Brickyard	Indianapolis Motor Speedway	14	2.982	Joe Gibbs Racing	Chevrolet	
32	305	August 12, 2007	2007	Centurion Boats at the Glen	Watkins Glen International	5	2.460	Joe Gibbs Racing	Chevrolet	
33	349	October 5, 2008	2008	AMP Energy 500	Talladega Superspeedway	34	0.052	Joe Gibbs Racing	Toyota	
34	369	June 7, 2009	2009	Pocono 500	Pocono Raceway	1 (Note: Stewart qualified on the pole position for the 2009 Pocono 500 but was required to start at the rear of the field because he drove a backup car after damaging his primary vehicle in an accident during practice the day before.)	2.004	Stewart–Haas Racing	Chevrolet	
35	373	July 4, 2009	2009	Coke Zero 400	Daytona International Speedway	1 (Note: Stewart was awarded the pole position after rain cancelled the qualifying session for the 2009 Coke Zero 400.)	0.110	Stewart–Haas Racing	Chevrolet	
36	377	August 10, 2009	2009	Heluva Good! Sour Cream Dips at The Glen	Watkins Glen International	13	2.969	Stewart–Haas Racing	Chevrolet	
37	384	October 4, 2009	2009	Price Chopper 400	Kansas Speedway	5	0.894	Stewart–Haas Racing	Chevrolet	
38	416	September 5, 2010	2010	Emory Healthcare 500	Atlanta Motor Speedway	5	1.316	Stewart–Haas Racing	Chevrolet	
39	421	October 10, 2010	2010	Pepsi Max 400	Auto Club Speedway	22	0.466	Stewart–Haas Racing	Chevrolet	
40	451	September 19, 2011	2011†	GEICO 400	Chicagoland Speedway	26	0.941	Stewart–Haas Racing	Chevrolet	
41	457	September 25, 2011	2011†	Sylvania 300	New Hampshire Motor Speedway	20	7.225	Stewart–Haas Racing	Chevrolet	
42	462	October 30, 2011	2011†	Tums Fast Relief 500	Martinsville Speedway	4	0.170	Stewart–Haas Racing	Chevrolet	
43	463	November 6, 2011	2011†	AAA Texas 500	Texas Motor Speedway	5	1.092	Stewart–Haas Racing	Chevrolet	
44	465	November 20, 2011	2011†	Ford 400	Homestead-Miami Speedway	15	1.306	Stewart–Haas Racing	Chevrolet	
45	468	March 11, 2012	2012	Kobalt Tools 400	Las Vegas Motor Speedway	7	0.461	Stewart–Haas Racing	Chevrolet	
46	470	March 25, 2012	2012	Auto Club 400	Auto Club Speedway	9	Caution	Stewart–Haas Racing	Chevrolet	
47	483	July 7, 2012	2012	Coke Zero 400	Daytona International Speedway	42 (Note: Stewart qualified second for the 2012 Coke Zero 400 but was required to begin from 42nd after an illegal air duct was discovered underneath Stewart's car seat during an inspection.)	Caution	Stewart–Haas Racing	Chevrolet	
48	514	June 2, 2013	2013	FedEx 400	Dover International Speedway	22	0.788	Stewart–Haas Racing	Chevrolet	
49	598	June 26, 2016	2016	Toyota/Save Mart 350	Sonoma Raceway	10	0.625	Stewart–Haas Racing	Chevrolet	

=== Nationwide Series ===
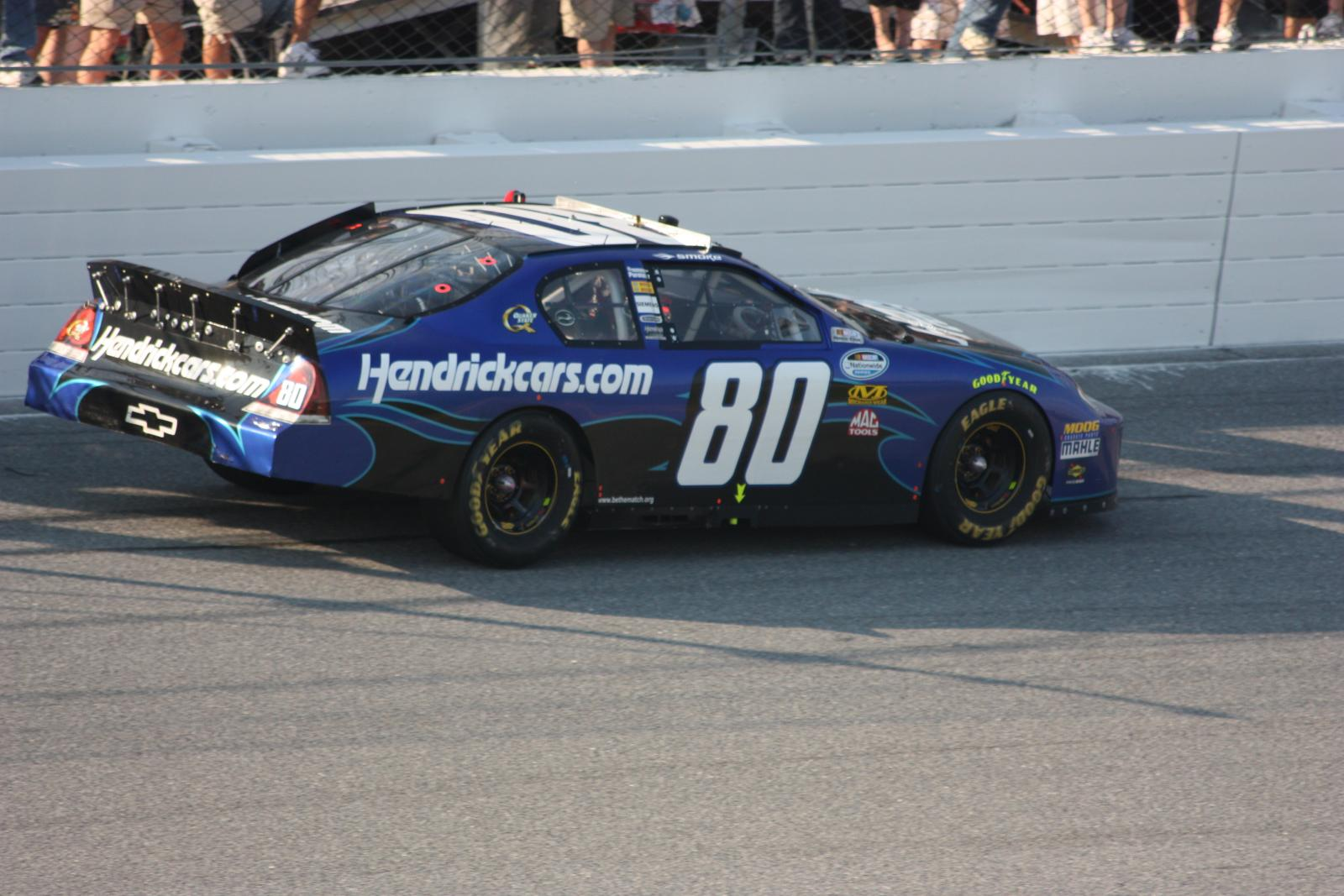
Stewart performing a Polish victory lap at the 2009 Camping World 300

In NASCAR's second-level series, variously known as the Busch Series, and Nationwide Series during Stewart's racing career and now known as the Xfinity Series. Stewart won 11 races. Two of those victories were during the period in which Anheuser-Busch's Busch beer brand was series sponsor, and the remaining nine were under the sponsorship of the Nationwide Mutual Insurance Company.

Nationwide Series victories
No.	Race	Date	Season	Race	Track	Grid	Margin	Team	Car	Ref
1	43	February 19, 2005	2005	Hershey's Take 5 300	Daytona International Speedway	14	Caution	Kevin Harvick Incorporated	Chevrolet	
2	55	February 18, 2006	2006	Hershey's Kissables 300	Daytona International Speedway	16	Caution	Kevin Harvick Incorporated	Chevrolet	
3	79	February 16, 2008	2008	Camping World 300	Daytona International Speedway	1	0.259	Joe Gibbs Racing	Toyota	
4	80	February 25, 2008	2008	Stater Brothers 300	Auto Club Speedway	2	2.408	Joe Gibbs Racing	Toyota	
5	83	April 26, 2008	2008	Aaron's 312	Talladega Superspeedway	1	0.302	Joe Gibbs Racing	Toyota	
6	84	May 9, 2008	2008	Diamond Hill Plywood 200	Darlington Raceway	3	0.814	Joe Gibbs Racing	Toyota	
7	85	June 28, 2008	2008	Camping World RV Sales 200	New Hampshire Motor Speedway	8	Caution	Joe Gibbs Racing	Toyota	
8	88	February 14, 2009	2009	Camping World 300	Daytona International Speedway	5	0.068	Hendrick Motorsports	Chevrolet	
9	91	February 13, 2010	2010	DRIVE4COPD 300	Daytona International Speedway	32	0.309	Kevin Harvick Incorporated	Chevrolet	
10	92	February 19, 2011	2011	DRIVE4COPD 300	Daytona International Speedway	14	0.007	Kevin Harvick Incorporated	Chevrolet	
11	95	February 23, 2013	2013	DRIVE4COPD 300	Daytona International Speedway	10	Caution	Richard Childress Racing	Chevrolet	

=== Craftsman Truck Series ===
In NASCAR's third-level series, known as the Craftsman Truck Series during Stewart's racing career and now the Gander RV & Outdoors Truck Series, Stewart won two races. Both victories came were during the period when Stanley Black & Decker's Craftsman brand was series sponsor.

Craftsman Truck Series victories
No.	Race	Date	Season	Race	Track	Grid	Margin	Team	Car	Ref
1	2	September 5, 2002	2002	Virginia Is For Lovers 200	Richmond International Raceway	25	0.259	Andy Petree Racing	Chevrolet	
2	3	September 4, 2003	2003	Virginia Is For Lovers 200	Richmond International Raceway	27	0.426	Andy Petree Racing	Chevrolet	

=== Victories at different tracks ===
The ‡ symbol indicates Stewart won at a track twice in a calendar year.

No.	Track	Years won	Wins
1	Daytona International Speedway	2005‡, 2006‡, 2008, 2009‡, 2010, 2011, 2012, 2013	11
2	Richmond International Raceway	1999, 2001, 2002‡, 2003	5
3	Watkins Glen International	2002, 2004, 2005, 2007, 2009	5
4	New Hampshire Motor Speedway	2000, 2005, 2008, 2011	4
5	Atlanta Motor Speedway	2002, 2006, 2010	3
6	Auto Club Speedway	2008, 2010, 2012	3
7	Chicagoland Speedway	2004, 2007, 2011	3
8	Dover International Speedway	2000‡, 2013	3
9	Homestead-Miami Speedway	1999, 2000, 2011	3
10	Martinsville Speedway	2000, 2006, 2011	3
11	Sonoma Raceway	2001, 2005, 2016	3
12	Indianapolis Motor Speedway	2005, 2007	2
13	Kansas Speedway	2006, 2009	2
14	Pocono Raceway	2003, 2009	2
15	Talladega Superspeedway	2008‡	2
16	Texas Motor Speedway	2006, 2011	2
17	Bristol Motor Speedway	2001	1
18	Darlington Raceway	2008	1
19	Las Vegas Motor Speedway	2012	1
20	Lowe's Motor Speedway	2003	1
21	Michigan International Speedway	2000	1
22	Phoenix International Raceway	1999	1
Total number of race wins:			62

== See also ==
- List of all-time NASCAR Cup Series winners
