= 1999 Pop Secret Microwave Popcorn 400 =

31st race of the 1999 NASCAR Winston Cup Series

Race details
- Race 31 of 34 in the 1999 NASCAR Winston Cup Series
- The 1999 Pop Secret Microwave Popcorn 400 program cover.
- Date: October 24, 1999
- Official name: 35th Annual Pop Secret Microwave Popcorn 400
- Location: Rockingham, North Carolina, Rockingham Speedway
- Course: Permanent racing facility
- Course length: 1.017 miles (1.636 km)
- Distance: 393 laps, 399.681 mi (643.224 km)
- Average speed: 131.103 miles per hour (210.990 km/h)
- Attendance: 50,000

Pole position
Driver	Mark Martin	Roush Racing
- Time: 23.263

Most laps led
Driver	Dale Jarrett	Robert Yates Racing
- Laps: 160

Winner
No. 99	Jeff Burton	Roush Racing

Television in the United States
- Network: TNN
- Announcers: Eli Gold, Buddy Baker, Dick Berggren

Radio in the United States
- Radio: Motor Racing Network

The 1999 Pop Secret Microwave Popcorn 400 was the 31st stock car race of the 1999 NASCAR Winston Cup Series and the 35th iteration of the event. The race was held on Sunday, October 24, 1999, before an audience of 50,000 in Rockingham, North Carolina, at Rockingham Speedway, a 1.017 miles (1.637 km) permanent high-banked racetrack. The race took the scheduled 393 laps to complete. In the final laps of the race, Roush Racing driver Jeff Burton would manage to pull away from the field with 68 to go to win his 11th career NASCAR Winston Cup Series victory and his sixth and final victory of the season. To fill out the podium, Bill Davis Racing driver Ward Burton and Joe Gibbs Racing driver Bobby Labonte would finish second and third, respectively.

== Background ==
The layout of Rockingham Speedway, the venue where the race was held.

Rockingham Speedway is a 0.94 mi (1.513 km) D-shaped oval track in Rockingham, North Carolina. The track has held a variety of events since its opening in 1965, including the NASCAR Cup Series from 1965 to 2004, and currently the NASCAR O'Reilly Auto Parts Series and NASCAR Craftsman Truck Series. It has a 32,000-seat capacity as of 2012. Rockingham Speedway is owned by the International Hot Rod Association (IHRA).

=== Entry list ===
- (R) denotes rookie driver.

#	Driver	Team	Make
1	Steve Park	Dale Earnhardt, Inc.	Chevrolet
2	Rusty Wallace	Penske-Kranefuss Racing	Ford
3	Dale Earnhardt	Richard Childress Racing	Chevrolet
4	Bobby Hamilton	Morgan–McClure Motorsports	Chevrolet
5	Terry Labonte	Hendrick Motorsports	Chevrolet
6	Mark Martin	Roush Racing	Ford
7	Michael Waltrip	Mattei Motorsports	Chevrolet
9	Stacy Compton	Melling Racing	Ford
10	Ricky Rudd	Rudd Performance Motorsports	Ford
11	Brett Bodine	Brett Bodine Racing	Ford
12	Jeremy Mayfield	Penske-Kranefuss Racing	Ford
16	Kevin Lepage	Roush Racing	Ford
17	Matt Kenseth	Roush Racing	Ford
18	Bobby Labonte	Joe Gibbs Racing	Pontiac
20	Tony Stewart (R)	Joe Gibbs Racing	Pontiac
21	Elliott Sadler (R)	Wood Brothers Racing	Ford
22	Ward Burton	Bill Davis Racing	Pontiac
23	Jimmy Spencer	Haas-Carter Motorsports	Ford
24	Jeff Gordon	Hendrick Motorsports	Chevrolet
25	Wally Dallenbach Jr.	Hendrick Motorsports	Chevrolet
26	Johnny Benson Jr.	Roush Racing	Ford
28	Kenny Irwin Jr.	Robert Yates Racing	Ford
30	Mike Bliss	Bahari Racing	Pontiac
31	Mike Skinner	Richard Childress Racing	Chevrolet
33	Ken Schrader	Andy Petree Racing	Chevrolet
36	Jerry Nadeau	MB2 Motorsports	Pontiac
40	Sterling Marlin	Team SABCO	Chevrolet
41	Derrike Cope	Larry Hedrick Motorsports	Chevrolet
42	Joe Nemechek	Team SABCO	Chevrolet
43	John Andretti	Petty Enterprises	Pontiac
44	Kyle Petty	Petty Enterprises	Pontiac
45	David Green	Tyler Jet Motorsports	Pontiac
50	Ricky Craven	Midwest Transit Racing	Chevrolet
55	Kenny Wallace	Andy Petree Racing	Chevrolet
58	Hut Stricklin	SBIII Motorsports	Ford
60	Geoff Bodine	Joe Bessey Racing	Chevrolet
66	Darrell Waltrip	Haas-Carter Motorsports	Ford
71	Dave Marcis	Marcis Auto Racing	Chevrolet
75	Ted Musgrave	Butch Mock Motorsports	Ford
77	Robert Pressley	Jasper Motorsports	Ford
88	Dale Jarrett	Robert Yates Racing	Ford
90	Ed Berrier	Donlavey Racing	Ford
91	Rich Bickle	LJ Racing	Chevrolet
94	Bill Elliott	Bill Elliott Racing	Ford
97	Chad Little	Roush Racing	Ford
98	Rick Mast	Cale Yarborough Motorsports	Ford
99	Jeff Burton	Roush Racing	Ford
Official entry list

== Practice ==
=== First practice ===
The first practice session was held on Friday, October 22, at 10:00 AM EST. The session would last for one hour and 15 minutes. Dale Jarrett, driving for Robert Yates Racing, would set the fastest time in the session, with a lap of 23.346 and an average speed of 156.823 mph (252.382 km/h).

Pos.	#	Driver	Team	Make	Time	Speed
1	88	Dale Jarrett	Robert Yates Racing	Ford	23.346	156.823
2	22	Ward Burton	Bill Davis Racing	Pontiac	23.494	155.836
3	12	Jeremy Mayfield	Penske-Kranefuss Racing	Ford	23.501	155.789
Full first practice results

=== Second practice ===
The second practice session was held on Friday, October 22, at 12:00 PM EST. The session would last for 30 minutes. Jeff Gordon, driving for Hendrick Motorsports, would set the fastest time in the session, with a lap of 23.272 and an average speed of 157.322 mph (253.185 km/h).

Pos.	#	Driver	Team	Make	Time	Speed
1	24	Jeff Gordon	Hendrick Motorsports	Chevrolet	23.272	157.322
2	20	Tony Stewart (R)	Joe Gibbs Racing	Pontiac	23.366	156.689
3	12	Jeremy Mayfield	Penske-Kranefuss Racing	Ford	23.416	156.355
Full second practice results

=== Final practice ===
The final practice session, sometimes referred to as Happy Hour, was held on Saturday, October 23. The session would last for one hour. Ward Burton, driving for Bill Davis Racing, would set the fastest time in the session, with a lap of 24.018 and an average speed of 152.436 mph (245.322 km/h).

Pos.	#	Driver	Team	Make	Time	Speed
1	22	Ward Burton	Bill Davis Racing	Pontiac	24.018	152.436
2	2	Rusty Wallace	Penske-Kranefuss Racing	Ford	24.058	152.182
3	12	Jeremy Mayfield	Penske-Kranefuss Racing	Ford	24.083	152.024
Full Happy Hour practice results

== Qualifying ==
Qualifying was split into two rounds. The first round was held on Friday, October 22, at 2:00 PM EST. Each driver would have one lap to set a time. During the first round, the top 25 drivers in the round would be guaranteed a starting spot in the race. If a driver was not able to guarantee a spot in the first round, they had the option to scrub their time from the first round and try and run a faster lap time in a second round qualifying run, held on Saturday, October 23, at 9:30 AM EST. As with the first round, each driver would have one lap to set a time. Positions 26-36 would be decided on time, while positions 37-43 would be based on provisionals. Six spots are awarded by the use of provisionals based on owner's points. The seventh is awarded to a past champion who has not otherwise qualified for the race. If no past champion needs the provisional, the next team in the owner points will be awarded a provisional.

Mark Martin, driving for Roush Racing, would win the pole, setting a time of 23.263 and an average speed of 157.383 miles per hour (253.283 km/h).

Four drivers would fail to qualify: Dave Marcis, Rich Bickle, Hut Stricklin, and Ed Berrier.

=== Full qualifying results ===
Pos.	#	Driver	Team	Make	Time	Speed
1	6	Mark Martin	Roush Racing	Ford	23.263	157.383
2	12	Jeremy Mayfield	Penske-Kranefuss Racing	Ford	23.306	157.093
3	88	Dale Jarrett	Robert Yates Racing	Ford	23.327	156.951
4	24	Jeff Gordon	Hendrick Motorsports	Chevrolet	23.348	156.810
5	18	Bobby Labonte	Joe Gibbs Racing	Pontiac	23.349	156.803
6	99	Jeff Burton	Roush Racing	Ford	23.398	156.475
7	50	Ricky Craven	Midwest Transit Racing	Chevrolet	23.412	156.381
8	20	Tony Stewart (R)	Joe Gibbs Racing	Pontiac	23.462	156.048
9	60	Geoff Bodine	Joe Bessey Racing	Chevrolet	23.465	156.028
10	33	Ken Schrader	Andy Petree Racing	Chevrolet	23.471	155.988
11	22	Ward Burton	Bill Davis Racing	Pontiac	23.488	155.875
12	42	Joe Nemechek	Team SABCO	Chevrolet	23.503	155.776
13	5	Terry Labonte	Hendrick Motorsports	Chevrolet	23.512	155.716
14	25	Wally Dallenbach Jr.	Hendrick Motorsports	Chevrolet	23.519	155.670
15	10	Ricky Rudd	Rudd Performance Motorsports	Ford	23.529	155.604
16	98	Rick Mast	Cale Yarborough Motorsports	Ford	23.531	155.590
17	17	Matt Kenseth	Roush Racing	Ford	23.548	155.478
18	43	John Andretti	Petty Enterprises	Pontiac	23.550	155.465
19	28	Kenny Irwin Jr.	Robert Yates Racing	Ford	23.563	155.379
20	75	Ted Musgrave	Butch Mock Motorsports	Ford	23.566	155.359
21	26	Johnny Benson Jr.	Roush Racing	Ford	23.567	155.353
22	7	Michael Waltrip	Mattei Motorsports	Chevrolet	23.568	155.346
23	40	Sterling Marlin	Team SABCO	Chevrolet	23.573	155.313
24	45	David Green	Tyler Jet Motorsports	Pontiac	23.581	155.261
25	2	Rusty Wallace	Penske-Kranefuss Racing	Ford	23.583	155.247
26	55	Kenny Wallace	Andy Petree Racing	Chevrolet	23.445	156.161
27	16	Kevin Lepage	Roush Racing	Ford	23.536	155.557
28	44	Kyle Petty	Petty Enterprises	Pontiac	23.589	155.508
29	41	Derrike Cope	Larry Hedrick Motorsports	Chevrolet	23.591	155.195
30	21	Elliott Sadler (R)	Wood Brothers Racing	Ford	23.604	155.109
31	77	Robert Pressley	Jasper Motorsports	Ford	23.605	155.103
32	36	Jerry Nadeau	MB2 Motorsports	Pontiac	23.608	155.083
33	66	Darrell Waltrip	Haas-Carter Motorsports	Ford	23.613	155.050
34	94	Bill Elliott	Bill Elliott Racing	Ford	23.614	155.044
35	4	Bobby Hamilton	Morgan–McClure Motorsports	Chevrolet	23.622	154.991
36	11	Brett Bodine	Brett Bodine Racing	Ford	23.644	154.847
Provisionals
37	3	Dale Earnhardt	Richard Childress Racing	Chevrolet	-*	-*
38	31	Mike Skinner	Richard Childress Racing	Chevrolet	-*	-*
39	1	Steve Park	Dale Earnhardt, Inc.	Chevrolet	-*	-*
40	23	Jimmy Spencer	Haas-Carter Motorsports	Ford	-*	-*
41	97	Chad Little	Roush Racing	Ford	-*	-*
42	9	Stacy Compton	Melling Racing	Ford	-*	-*
43	30	Mike Bliss	Bahari Racing	Pontiac	-*	-*
Failed to qualify
44	71	Dave Marcis	Marcis Auto Racing	Chevrolet	23.659	154.749
45	91	Rich Bickle	LJ Racing	Chevrolet	23.866	153.407
46	58	Hut Stricklin	SBIII Motorsports	Ford	23.922	153.047
47	90	Ed Berrier	Donlavey Racing	Ford	24.071	152.100
Official starting lineup

== Race results ==
Fin	St	#	Driver	Team	Make	Laps	Led	Status	Pts	Winnings
1	6	99	Jeff Burton	Roush Racing	Ford	393	71	running	180	$104,715
2	11	22	Ward Burton	Bill Davis Racing	Pontiac	393	26	running	175	$78,625
3	5	18	Bobby Labonte	Joe Gibbs Racing	Pontiac	393	1	running	170	$67,075
4	3	88	Dale Jarrett	Robert Yates Racing	Ford	393	160	running	170	$61,175
5	25	2	Rusty Wallace	Penske-Kranefuss Racing	Ford	393	107	running	160	$60,875
6	1	6	Mark Martin	Roush Racing	Ford	393	4	running	155	$55,850
7	18	43	John Andretti	Petty Enterprises	Pontiac	393	0	running	146	$51,450
8	23	40	Sterling Marlin	Team SABCO	Chevrolet	393	0	running	142	$43,100
9	2	12	Jeremy Mayfield	Penske-Kranefuss Racing	Ford	392	22	running	143	$43,650
10	35	4	Bobby Hamilton	Morgan–McClure Motorsports	Chevrolet	392	0	running	134	$54,565
11	4	24	Jeff Gordon	Hendrick Motorsports	Chevrolet	392	0	running	130	$50,790
12	8	20	Tony Stewart (R)	Joe Gibbs Racing	Pontiac	392	0	running	127	$43,600
13	19	28	Kenny Irwin Jr.	Robert Yates Racing	Ford	392	0	running	124	$39,050
14	13	5	Terry Labonte	Hendrick Motorsports	Chevrolet	392	2	running	126	$41,650
15	39	1	Steve Park	Dale Earnhardt, Inc.	Chevrolet	392	0	running	118	$38,850
16	26	55	Kenny Wallace	Andy Petree Racing	Chevrolet	391	0	running	115	$33,365
17	38	31	Mike Skinner	Richard Childress Racing	Chevrolet	391	0	running	112	$36,950
18	30	21	Elliott Sadler (R)	Wood Brothers Racing	Ford	391	0	running	109	$37,150
19	15	10	Ricky Rudd	Rudd Performance Motorsports	Ford	391	0	running	106	$36,150
20	40	23	Jimmy Spencer	Haas-Carter Motorsports	Ford	391	0	running	103	$38,765
21	41	97	Chad Little	Roush Racing	Ford	390	0	running	100	$35,600
22	27	16	Kevin Lepage	Roush Racing	Ford	390	0	running	97	$35,250
23	28	44	Kyle Petty	Petty Enterprises	Pontiac	390	0	running	94	$27,625
24	24	45	David Green	Tyler Jet Motorsports	Pontiac	389	0	running	91	$27,300
25	29	41	Derrike Cope	Larry Hedrick Motorsports	Chevrolet	389	0	running	88	$27,300
26	12	42	Joe Nemechek	Team SABCO	Chevrolet	389	0	running	85	$33,700
27	22	7	Michael Waltrip	Mattei Motorsports	Chevrolet	389	0	running	82	$33,400
28	21	26	Johnny Benson Jr.	Roush Racing	Ford	388	0	running	79	$33,100
29	31	77	Robert Pressley	Jasper Motorsports	Ford	387	0	running	76	$25,925
30	10	33	Ken Schrader	Andy Petree Racing	Chevrolet	386	0	running	73	$32,525
31	9	60	Geoff Bodine	Joe Bessey Racing	Chevrolet	386	0	running	70	$22,650
32	20	75	Ted Musgrave	Butch Mock Motorsports	Ford	386	0	running	67	$22,525
33	34	94	Bill Elliott	Bill Elliott Racing	Ford	385	0	running	64	$29,400
34	33	66	Darrell Waltrip	Haas-Carter Motorsports	Ford	385	0	running	61	$22,275
35	17	17	Matt Kenseth	Roush Racing	Ford	382	0	engine	58	$22,150
36	42	9	Stacy Compton	Melling Racing	Ford	382	0	running	55	$22,600
37	32	36	Jerry Nadeau	MB2 Motorsports	Pontiac	378	0	running	52	$29,050
38	16	98	Rick Mast	Cale Yarborough Motorsports	Ford	369	0	running	49	$22,000
39	14	25	Wally Dallenbach Jr.	Hendrick Motorsports	Chevrolet	319	0	crash	46	$32,550
40	37	3	Dale Earnhardt	Richard Childress Racing	Chevrolet	318	0	crash	43	$36,900
41	7	50	Ricky Craven	Midwest Transit Racing	Chevrolet	309	0	crash	40	$21,850
42	43	30	Mike Bliss	Bahari Racing	Pontiac	278	0	engine	37	$21,800
43	36	11	Brett Bodine	Brett Bodine Racing	Ford	127	0	engine	34	$28,944
Failed to qualify
44		71	Dave Marcis	Marcis Auto Racing	Chevrolet					
45		91	Rich Bickle	LJ Racing	Chevrolet					
46		58	Hut Stricklin	SBIII Motorsports	Ford					
47		90	Ed Berrier	Donlavey Racing	Ford					
Official race results

Previous race: 1999 Winston 500	NASCAR Winston Cup Series; 1999 season	Next race: 1999 Checker Auto Parts/Dura Lube 500k
