= 2000 UAW-GM Quality 500 =

29th race of the 2000 NASCAR Winston Cup Series

Race details
- Race 29 of 34 in the 2000 NASCAR Winston Cup Series
- The 2000 UAW-GM Quality 500 program cover, with artwork by NASCAR artist Sam Bass.
- Date: October 8, 2000
- Official name: 41st Annual UAW-GM Quality 500
- Location: Concord, North Carolina, Lowe's Motor Speedway
- Course: Permanent racing facility
- Course length: 1.5 miles (2.414 km)
- Distance: 334 laps, 501 mi (806.281 km)
- Average speed: 133.63 miles per hour (215.06 km/h)
- Attendance: 140,000

Pole position
Driver	Jeff Gordon	Hendrick Motorsports
- Time: 29.101

Most laps led
Driver	Ricky Rudd	Robert Yates Racing
- Laps: 98

Winner
No. 18	Bobby Labonte	Joe Gibbs Racing

Television in the United States
- Network: TBS
- Announcers: Allen Bestwick, Buddy Baker, Dick Berggren

Radio in the United States
- Radio: Performance Racing Network

The 2000 UAW-GM Quality 500 was the 29th stock car race of the 2000 NASCAR Winston Cup Series and the 41st iteration of the event. The race was held on Sunday, October 8, 2000, before an audience of 140,000 in Concord, North Carolina, at Charlotte Motor Speedway, a 1.5 miles (2.4 km) permanent quad-oval. The race took the scheduled 334 laps to complete. In the final laps of the race, Joe Gibbs Racing's Bobby Labonte managed to make a late-race pass for the lead, assisted by a late four-tire pit stop. The victory was Labonte's 15th career NASCAR Winston Cup Series victory and his fourth and final victory of the season. To fill out the top three, Penske-Kranefuss Racing's Jeremy Mayfield and Robert Yates Racing's Ricky Rudd finished second and third, respectively.

== Background ==
The layout of Lowe's Motor Speedway, the venue where the race was held.

Charlotte Motor Speedway is a motorsports complex located in Concord, North Carolina, United States 13 miles from Charlotte, North Carolina. The complex features a 1.5 miles (2.4 km) quad oval track that hosts NASCAR racing including the prestigious Coca-Cola 600 on Memorial Day weekend and the NEXTEL All-Star Challenge, as well as the UAW-GM Quality 500. The speedway was built in 1959 by Bruton Smith and is considered the home track for NASCAR with many race teams located in the Charlotte area. The track is owned and operated by Speedway Motorsports Inc. (SMI) with Marcus Smith (son of Bruton Smith) as track president.

=== Entry list ===
- (R) denotes rookie driver.

#	Driver	Team	Make
1	Steve Park	Dale Earnhardt, Inc.	Chevrolet
01	Ted Musgrave	Team SABCO	Chevrolet
2	Rusty Wallace	Penske-Kranefuss Racing	Ford
3	Dale Earnhardt	Richard Childress Racing	Chevrolet
4	Bobby Hamilton	Morgan–McClure Motorsports	Chevrolet
5	Terry Labonte	Hendrick Motorsports	Chevrolet
6	Mark Martin	Roush Racing	Ford
7	Michael Waltrip	Mattei Motorsports	Chevrolet
8	Dale Earnhardt Jr. (R)	Dale Earnhardt, Inc.	Chevrolet
9	Stacy Compton (R)	Melling Racing	Ford
10	Johnny Benson Jr.	Tyler Jet Motorsports	Pontiac
11	Brett Bodine	Brett Bodine Racing	Ford
12	Jeremy Mayfield	Penske-Kranefuss Racing	Ford
13	Robby Gordon	Team Menard	Ford
14	Rick Mast	A. J. Foyt Enterprises	Pontiac
16	Kevin Lepage	Roush Racing	Ford
17	Matt Kenseth (R)	Roush Racing	Ford
18	Bobby Labonte	Joe Gibbs Racing	Pontiac
20	Tony Stewart	Joe Gibbs Racing	Pontiac
21	Elliott Sadler	Wood Brothers Racing	Ford
22	Ward Burton	Bill Davis Racing	Pontiac
24	Jeff Gordon	Hendrick Motorsports	Chevrolet
25	Jerry Nadeau	Hendrick Motorsports	Chevrolet
26	Jimmy Spencer	Haas-Carter Motorsports	Ford
27	Mike Bliss (R)	Eel River Racing	Pontiac
28	Ricky Rudd	Robert Yates Racing	Ford
31	Mike Skinner	Richard Childress Racing	Chevrolet
32	Scott Pruett (R)	PPI Motorsports	Ford
33	Joe Nemechek	Andy Petree Racing	Chevrolet
36	Ken Schrader	MB2 Motorsports	Pontiac
40	Sterling Marlin	Team SABCO	Chevrolet
43	John Andretti	Petty Enterprises	Pontiac
44	Steve Grissom	Petty Enterprises	Pontiac
50	Ricky Craven	Midwest Transit Racing	Chevrolet
55	Kenny Wallace	Andy Petree Racing	Chevrolet
60	Dick Trickle	Joe Bessey Racing	Chevrolet
66	Darrell Waltrip	Haas-Carter Motorsports	Ford
71	Kerry Earnhardt (Note: Earnhardt crashed the team's primary car during the second practice session of the race weekend. As a result of the crash, team owner Dave Marcis would replace Earnhardt for second-round qualifying.)	Marcis Auto Racing	Chevrolet
75	Wally Dallenbach Jr.	Galaxy Motorsports	Ford
77	Robert Pressley	Jasper Motorsports	Ford
85	Carl Long	Mansion Motorsports	Ford
88	Dale Jarrett	Robert Yates Racing	Ford
90	Hut Stricklin	Donlavey Racing	Ford
91	Larry Gunselman	LJ Racing	Chevrolet
93	Dave Blaney (R)	Bill Davis Racing	Pontiac
94	Bill Elliott	Bill Elliott Racing	Ford
96	Andy Houston	PPI Motorsports	Ford
97	Kurt Busch	Roush Racing	Ford
98	Jeff Fuller	MacPherson Motorsports	Ford
99	Jeff Burton	Roush Racing	Ford
Official entry list

== Practice ==
=== First practice ===
The first practice session was held on Wednesday, October 4, at 3:00 PM EST. The session would last for three hours. Robert Yates Racing's Ricky Rudd set the fastest time in the session, with a lap of 29.292 and an average speed of 184.351 mph (296.684 km/h).

Pos.	#	Driver	Team	Make	Time	Speed
1	28	Ricky Rudd	Robert Yates Racing	Ford	29.292	184.351
2	12	Jeremy Mayfield	Penske-Kranefuss Racing	Ford	29.300	184.300
3	22	Ward Burton	Bill Davis Racing	Pontiac	29.341	184.043
Full first practice results

=== Second practice ===
The second practice session was held on Thursday, October 5, at 2:30 PM EST. The session would last for two hours. Team SABCO's Ted Musgrave set the fastest time in the session, with a lap of 29.962 and an average speed of 180.228 mph (290.049 km/h).

Pos.	#	Driver	Team	Make	Time	Speed
1	01	Ted Musgrave	Team SABCO	Chevrolet	29.962	180.228
2	2	Rusty Wallace	Penske-Kranefuss Racing	Ford	29.999	180.006
3	1	Steve Park	Dale Earnhardt, Inc.	Chevrolet	30.137	179.182
Full second practice results

=== Third practice ===
The third practice session was held on Saturday, October 7, at 9:00 AM EST. The session would last for one hour. Hendrick Motorsports' Jerry Nadeau set the fastest time in the session, with a lap of 29.697 and an average speed of 181.837 mph (292.638 km/h).

Pos.	#	Driver	Team	Make	Time	Speed
1	25	Jerry Nadeau	Hendrick Motorsports	Chevrolet	29.697	181.837
2	22	Ward Burton	Bill Davis Racing	Pontiac	29.780	181.330
3	4	Bobby Hamilton	Morgan–McClure Motorsports	Chevrolet	29.801	181.202
Full third practice results

=== Final practice ===
The final practice session, sometimes referred to as Happy Hour, was held on Saturday, October 7, after the 2000 All Pro Bumper to Bumper 300. The session would last for one hour. Penske-Kranefuss Racing's Jeremy Mayfield set the fastest time in the session, with a lap of 30.093 and an average speed of 179.444 mph (288.787 km/h).

Pos.	#	Driver	Team	Make	Time	Speed
1	12	Jeremy Mayfield	Penske-Kranefuss Racing	Ford	30.093	179.444
2	2	Rusty Wallace	Penske-Kranefuss Racing	Ford	30.159	179.051
3	22	Ward Burton	Bill Davis Racing	Pontiac	30.162	179.033
Full final practice results

== Qualifying ==
Qualifying was split into two rounds. The first round was held on Wednesday, October 4, at 8:00 PM EST. Each driver would have two laps to set a fastest time; the fastest of the two would count as their official qualifying lap. During the first round, the top 25 drivers in the round would be guaranteed a starting spot in the race. If a driver was not able to guarantee a spot in the first round, they had the option to scrub their time from the first round and try and run a faster lap time in a second round qualifying run, held on Thursday, October 5, at 6:00 PM EST. As with the first round, each driver would have two laps to set a fastest time; the fastest of the two would count as their official qualifying lap. Positions 26-36 would be decided on time, while positions 37-43 would be based on provisionals. Six spots were awarded by the use of provisionals based on owner's points. The seventh was awarded to a past champion who has not otherwise qualified for the race. If no past champion needs the provisional, the next team in the owner points was awarded a provisional.

Jeff Gordon, driving for Hendrick Motorsports, would win the pole, setting a time of 29.101 and an average speed of 185.561 miles per hour (298.631 km/h) in the first round.

Seven drivers would fail to qualify.

=== Full qualifying results ===
Pos.	#	Driver	Team	Make	Time	Speed
1	24	Jeff Gordon	Hendrick Motorsports	Chevrolet	29.101	185.561
2	18	Bobby Labonte	Joe Gibbs Racing	Pontiac	29.108	185.516
3	25	Jerry Nadeau	Hendrick Motorsports	Chevrolet	29.113	185.484
4	26	Jimmy Spencer	Haas-Carter Motorsports	Ford	29.165	185.153
5	88	Dale Jarrett	Robert Yates Racing	Ford	29.173	185.103
6	28	Ricky Rudd	Robert Yates Racing	Ford	29.211	184.862
7	94	Bill Elliott	Bill Elliott Racing	Ford	29.238	184.691
8	6	Mark Martin	Roush Racing	Ford	29.253	184.596
9	10	Johnny Benson Jr.	MB2 Motorsports	Pontiac	29.253	184.596
10	12	Jeremy Mayfield	Penske-Kranefuss Racing	Ford	29.265	184.521
11	14	Rick Mast	A. J. Foyt Racing	Pontiac	29.268	184.502
12	22	Ward Burton	Bill Davis Racing	Pontiac	29.275	184.458
13	8	Dale Earnhardt Jr. (R)	Dale Earnhardt, Inc.	Chevrolet	29.276	184.451
14	7	Michael Waltrip	Ultra Motorsports	Chevrolet	29.311	184.231
15	77	Robert Pressley	Jasper Motorsports	Ford	29.350	183.986
16	16	Kevin Lepage	Roush Racing	Ford	29.365	183.892
17	20	Tony Stewart	Joe Gibbs Racing	Pontiac	29.385	183.767
18	31	Mike Skinner	Richard Childress Racing	Chevrolet	29.389	183.742
19	4	Bobby Hamilton	Morgan–McClure Motorsports	Chevrolet	29.389	183.742
20	36	Ken Schrader	MB2 Motorsports	Pontiac	29.396	183.698
21	33	Joe Nemechek	Andy Petree Racing	Chevrolet	29.429	183.492
22	2	Rusty Wallace	Penske-Kranefuss Racing	Ford	29.431	183.480
23	21	Elliott Sadler	Wood Brothers Racing	Ford	29.455	183.331
24	75	Wally Dallenbach Jr.	Galaxy Motorsports	Ford	29.457	183.318
25	13	Robby Gordon	Team Menard	Ford	29.501	183.045
Failed to lock in the first round
26	17	Matt Kenseth (R)	Roush Racing	Ford	29.516	182.952
27	98	Jeff Fuller	MacPherson Motorsports	Ford	29.524	182.902
28	43	John Andretti	Petty Enterprises	Pontiac	29.533	182.846
29	93	Dave Blaney (R)	Bill Davis Racing	Pontiac	29.597	182.451
30	27	Mike Bliss (R)	Eel River Racing	Pontiac	29.621	182.303
31	11	Brett Bodine	Brett Bodine Racing	Ford	29.627	182.266
32	55	Kenny Wallace	Andy Petree Racing	Chevrolet	29.635	182.217
33	96	Andy Houston	PPI Motorsports	Ford	29.683	181.922
34	66	Darrell Waltrip	Haas-Carter Motorsports	Ford	29.687	181.898
35	60	Dick Trickle	Joe Bessey Racing	Chevrolet	29.694	181.855
36	90	Hut Stricklin	Donlavey Racing	Ford	29.699	181.824
Provisionals
37	3	Dale Earnhardt	Richard Childress Racing	Chevrolet	30.149	179.110
38	99	Jeff Burton	Roush Racing	Ford	29.830	181.026
39	1	Steve Park	Dale Earnhardt, Inc.	Chevrolet	30.208	178.761
40	5	Terry Labonte	Hendrick Motorsports	Chevrolet	29.812	181.135
41	40	Sterling Marlin	Team SABCO	Chevrolet	29.941	180.355
42	97	Kurt Busch	Roush Racing	Ford	29.886	180.687
43	01	Ted Musgrave	Team SABCO	Chevrolet	29.928	180.433
Failed to qualify
44	32	Scott Pruett (R)	PPI Motorsports	Ford	29.748	181.525
45	50	Ricky Craven	Midwest Transit Racing	Chevrolet	30.115	179.313
46	44	Steve Grissom	Petty Enterprises	Pontiac	30.253	178.495
47	85	Carl Long	Mansion Motorsports	Ford	30.276	178.359
48	9	Stacy Compton (R)	Melling Racing	Ford	30.329	178.047
49	71	Dave Marcis	Marcis Auto Racing	Chevrolet	30.498	177.061
50	91	Larry Gunselman	LJ Racing	Chevrolet	-	-
Official first round qualifying results
Official starting lineup

== Race results ==
Fin	St	#	Driver	Team	Make	Laps	Led	Status	Pts	Winnings
1	2	18	Bobby Labonte	Joe Gibbs Racing	Pontiac	334	37	running	180	$220,700
2	10	12	Jeremy Mayfield	Penske-Kranefuss Racing	Ford	334	46	running	175	$89,550
3	6	28	Ricky Rudd	Robert Yates Racing	Ford	334	98	running	175	$104,950
4	17	20	Tony Stewart	Joe Gibbs Racing	Pontiac	334	30	running	165	$84,650
5	8	6	Mark Martin	Roush Racing	Ford	334	0	running	155	$70,250
6	38	99	Jeff Burton	Roush Racing	Ford	334	6	running	155	$75,300
7	39	1	Steve Park	Dale Earnhardt, Inc.	Chevrolet	334	0	running	146	$55,350
8	9	10	Johnny Benson Jr.	MB2 Motorsports	Pontiac	334	0	running	142	$43,000
9	26	17	Matt Kenseth (R)	Roush Racing	Ford	334	1	running	143	$50,100
10	12	22	Ward Burton	Bill Davis Racing	Pontiac	334	0	running	134	$68,100
11	37	3	Dale Earnhardt	Richard Childress Racing	Chevrolet	334	58	running	135	$58,750
12	16	16	Kevin Lepage	Roush Racing	Ford	334	2	running	132	$44,600
13	42	97	Kurt Busch	Roush Racing	Ford	334	0	running	124	$42,600
14	21	33	Joe Nemechek	Andy Petree Racing	Chevrolet	334	0	running	121	$45,800
15	4	26	Jimmy Spencer	Haas-Carter Motorsports	Ford	334	1	running	123	$46,300
16	23	21	Elliott Sadler	Wood Brothers Racing	Ford	334	0	running	115	$40,500
17	11	14	Rick Mast	A. J. Foyt Racing	Pontiac	334	0	running	112	$27,000
18	28	43	John Andretti	Petty Enterprises	Pontiac	334	0	running	109	$43,000
19	13	8	Dale Earnhardt Jr. (R)	Dale Earnhardt, Inc.	Chevrolet	334	0	running	106	$34,390
20	18	31	Mike Skinner	Richard Childress Racing	Chevrolet	333	0	running	103	$39,885
21	22	2	Rusty Wallace	Penske-Kranefuss Racing	Ford	333	21	running	105	$44,420
22	14	7	Michael Waltrip	Ultra Motorsports	Chevrolet	333	0	running	97	$34,925
23	35	60	Dick Trickle	Joe Bessey Racing	Chevrolet	333	0	running	94	$34,640
24	19	4	Bobby Hamilton	Morgan–McClure Motorsports	Chevrolet	333	0	running	91	$34,400
25	20	36	Ken Schrader	MB2 Motorsports	Pontiac	332	0	running	88	$26,570
26	33	96	Andy Houston	PPI Motorsports	Ford	332	0	running	85	$22,870
27	40	5	Terry Labonte	Hendrick Motorsports	Chevrolet	331	0	running	82	$40,770
28	29	93	Dave Blaney (R)	Bill Davis Racing	Pontiac	329	0	running	79	$22,670
29	43	01	Ted Musgrave	Team SABCO	Chevrolet	328	1	running	81	$33,870
30	34	66	Darrell Waltrip	Haas-Carter Motorsports	Ford	325	0	running	73	$25,970
31	41	40	Sterling Marlin	Team SABCO	Chevrolet	321	0	running	70	$33,370
32	31	11	Brett Bodine	Brett Bodine Racing	Ford	316	0	running	67	$22,270
33	24	75	Wally Dallenbach Jr.	Galaxy Motorsports	Ford	302	0	accident	64	$24,710
34	7	94	Bill Elliott	Bill Elliott Racing	Ford	267	0	engine	61	$30,765
35	15	77	Robert Pressley	Jasper Motorsports	Ford	238	0	accident	58	$22,135
36	3	25	Jerry Nadeau	Hendrick Motorsports	Chevrolet	232	32	accident	60	$40,015
37	32	55	Kenny Wallace	Andy Petree Racing	Chevrolet	185	0	running	52	$30,100
38	25	13	Robby Gordon	Team Menard	Ford	184	0	accident	49	$22,090
39	1	24	Jeff Gordon	Hendrick Motorsports	Chevrolet	170	1	accident	51	$65,980
40	5	88	Dale Jarrett	Robert Yates Racing	Ford	158	0	accident	43	$48,175
41	27	98	Jeff Fuller	MacPherson Motorsports	Ford	115	0	engine	40	$22,070
42	36	90	Hut Stricklin	Donlavey Racing	Ford	59	0	accident	37	$22,065
43	30	27	Mike Bliss (R)	Eel River Racing	Pontiac	5	0	accident	34	$22,064
Failed to qualify
44		32	Scott Pruett (R)	PPI Motorsports	Ford					
45		50	Ricky Craven	Midwest Transit Racing	Chevrolet					
46		44	Steve Grissom	Petty Enterprises	Pontiac					
47		85	Carl Long	Mansion Motorsports	Ford					
48		9	Stacy Compton (R)	Melling Racing	Ford					
49		71	Dave Marcis	Marcis Auto Racing	Chevrolet					
50		91	Larry Gunselman	LJ Racing	Chevrolet					
Official race results

== Standings after the race ==
Drivers' Championship standings

	Pos	Driver	Points
	1	Bobby Labonte	4,405
1	2	Jeff Burton	4,153 (-252)
1	3	Dale Earnhardt	4,147 (-258)
	4	Dale Jarrett	4,017 (–388)
	5	Tony Stewart	3,977 (–428)
	6	Ricky Rudd	3,972 (–433)
1	7	Mark Martin	3,848 (–557)
1	8	Rusty Wallace	3,808 (–597)
1	9	Ward Burton	3,565 (–840)
1	10	Jeff Gordon	3,564 (–841)
Official driver's standings

- Note: Only the first 10 positions are included for the driver standings.

== Notes ==
Previous race: 2000 NAPA Autocare 500	NASCAR Winston Cup Series; 2000 season	Next race: 2000 Winston 500
