= 2000 MBNA.com 400 =

27th race of the 2000 NASCAR Winston Cup Series

Race details
- Race 27 of 34 in the 2000 NASCAR Winston Cup Series
- The 2000 MBNA.com 400 program cover.
- Date: September 24, 2000
- Official name: 32nd Annual MBNA.com 400
- Location: Dover, Delaware, Dover International Speedway
- Course: Permanent racing facility
- Course length: 1 miles (1.609 km)
- Distance: 400 laps, 400 mi (643.737 km)
- Average speed: 115.191 miles per hour (185.382 km/h)

Pole position
| Driver | Jeremy Mayfield | Penske-Kranefuss Racing |
- Time: 22.518

Most laps led
| Driver | Tony Stewart | Joe Gibbs Racing |
- Laps: 163

Winner
| No. 20 | Tony Stewart | Joe Gibbs Racing |

Television in the United States
- Network: TNN
- Announcers: Eli Gold, Dick Berggren, Buddy Baker

Radio in the United States
- Radio: Motor Racing Network

The 2000 MBNA.com 400 was the 27th stock car race of the 2000 NASCAR Winston Cup Series and the 32nd iteration of the event. The race was held on Sunday, September 24, 2000, in Dover, Delaware at Dover International Speedway, a 1-mile (1.6 km) permanent oval-shaped racetrack. The race took the scheduled 400 laps to complete. At race's end, Joe Gibbs Racing driver Tony Stewart would manage to dominate the late stages of the race to take his seventh career NASCAR Winston Cup Series victory and his fourth victory of the season. To fill out the top three, MB2 Motorsports driver Johnny Benson Jr. and Robert Yates Racing driver Ricky Rudd would finish second and third, respectively. It was also the first NASCAR Winston Cup Series start of future champion Kurt Busch.

== Background ==
The layout of Dover International Speedway, the venue where the race was held.

Dover International Speedway is an oval race track in Dover, Delaware, United States that has held at least two NASCAR races since it opened in 1969. In addition to NASCAR, the track also hosted USAC and the NTT IndyCar Series. The track features one layout, a 1-mile (1.6 km) concrete oval, with 24° banking in the turns and 9° banking on the straights. The speedway is owned and operated by Dover Motorsports.

The track, nicknamed "The Monster Mile", was built in 1969 by Melvin Joseph of Melvin L. Joseph Construction Company, Inc., with an asphalt surface, but was replaced with concrete in 1995. Six years later in 2001, the track's capacity moved to 135,000 seats, making the track have the largest capacity of sports venue in the mid-Atlantic. In 2002, the name changed to Dover International Speedway from Dover Downs International Speedway after Dover Downs Gaming and Entertainment split, making Dover Motorsports. From 2007 to 2009, the speedway worked on an improvement project called "The Monster Makeover", which expanded facilities at the track and beautified the track. After the 2014 season, the track's capacity was reduced to 95,500 seats.

=== Entry list ===
- (R) denotes rookie driver.

| # | Driver | Team | Make |
|---|---|---|---|
| 1 | Steve Park | Dale Earnhardt, Inc. | Chevrolet |
| 01 | Ted Musgrave | Team SABCO | Chevrolet |
| 2 | Rusty Wallace | Penske-Kranefuss Racing | Ford |
| 3 | Dale Earnhardt | Richard Childress Racing | Chevrolet |
| 4 | Bobby Hamilton | Morgan–McClure Motorsports | Chevrolet |
| 5 | Terry Labonte | Hendrick Motorsports | Chevrolet |
| 6 | Mark Martin | Roush Racing | Ford |
| 7 | Michael Waltrip | Ultra Motorsports | Chevrolet |
| 8 | Dale Earnhardt Jr. (R) | Dale Earnhardt, Inc. | Chevrolet |
| 9 | Stacy Compton (R) | Melling Racing | Ford |
| 10 | Johnny Benson Jr. | MB2 Motorsports | Pontiac |
| 11 | Brett Bodine | Brett Bodine Racing | Ford |
| 12 | Jeremy Mayfield | Penske-Kranefuss Racing | Ford |
| 14 | Rick Mast | A. J. Foyt Enterprises | Pontiac |
| 16 | Kevin Lepage | Roush Racing | Ford |
| 17 | Matt Kenseth (R) | Roush Racing | Ford |
| 18 | Bobby Labonte | Joe Gibbs Racing | Pontiac |
| 20 | Tony Stewart | Joe Gibbs Racing | Pontiac |
| 21 | Elliott Sadler | Wood Brothers Racing | Ford |
| 22 | Ward Burton | Bill Davis Racing | Pontiac |
| 24 | Jeff Gordon | Hendrick Motorsports | Chevrolet |
| 25 | Jerry Nadeau | Hendrick Motorsports | Chevrolet |
| 26 | Jimmy Spencer | Haas-Carter Motorsports | Ford |
| 27 | Mike Bliss (R) | Eel River Racing | Pontiac |
| 28 | Ricky Rudd | Robert Yates Racing | Ford |
| 31 | Mike Skinner | Richard Childress Racing | Chevrolet |
| 32 | Scott Pruett (R) | PPI Motorsports | Ford |
| 33 | Joe Nemechek | Andy Petree Racing | Chevrolet |
| 36 | Ken Schrader | MB2 Motorsports | Pontiac |
| 40 | Sterling Marlin | Team SABCO | Chevrolet |
| 43 | John Andretti | Petty Enterprises | Pontiac |
| 44 | Steve Grissom | Petty Enterprises | Pontiac |
| 55 | Kenny Wallace | Andy Petree Racing | Chevrolet |
| 60 | Joe Bessey | Joe Bessey Racing | Chevrolet |
| 66 | Darrell Waltrip | Haas-Carter Motorsports | Ford |
| 71 | Dave Marcis | Marcis Auto Racing | Chevrolet |
| 75 | Wally Dallenbach Jr. | Galaxy Motorsports | Ford |
| 77 | Robert Pressley | Jasper Motorsports | Ford |
| 85 | Carl Long | Mansion Motorsports | Ford |
| 88 | Dale Jarrett | Robert Yates Racing | Ford |
| 90 | Hut Stricklin | Donlavey Racing | Ford |
| 93 | Dave Blaney (R) | Bill Davis Racing | Pontiac |
| 94 | Bill Elliott | Bill Elliott Racing | Ford |
| 97 | Kurt Busch | Roush Racing | Ford |
| 99 | Jeff Burton | Roush Racing | Ford |
Official entry list

== Practice ==
Originally, three practice sessions were scheduled to be held, with one on Friday and two on Saturday. However, due to rain, the first Saturday session was cancelled.

=== First practice ===
The first practice session was held on Friday, September 22, at 10:00 AM EST. The session would last for two hours. Johnny Benson Jr., driving for MB2 Motorsports, would set the fastest time in the session, with a lap of 22.518 and an average speed of 159.872 mph (257.289 km/h).

| Pos. | # | Driver | Team | Make | Time | Speed |
|---|---|---|---|---|---|---|
| 1 | 10 | Johnny Benson Jr. | MB2 Motorsports | Pontiac | 22.518 | 159.872 |
| 2 | 12 | Jeremy Mayfield | Penske-Kranefuss Racing | Ford | 22.522 | 159.843 |
| 3 | 2 | Rusty Wallace | Penske-Kranefuss Racing | Ford | 22.533 | 159.765 |
Full first practice results

=== Final practice ===
The final practice session, sometimes referred to as Happy Hour, was held on Saturday, September 23, after the preliminary 2000 MBNA.com 200 NASCAR Busch Series race. The session would last for one hour. Mark Martin, driving for Roush Racing, would set the fastest time in the session, with a lap of 23.519 and an average speed of 153.067 mph (246.337 km/h).

| Pos. | # | Driver | Team | Make | Time | Speed |
|---|---|---|---|---|---|---|
| 1 | 6 | Mark Martin | Roush Racing | Ford | 23.519 | 153.067 |
| 2 | 12 | Jeremy Mayfield | Penske-Kranefuss Racing | Ford | 23.521 | 153.054 |
| 3 | 31 | Mike Skinner | Richard Childress Racing | Chevrolet | 23.574 | 152.710 |
Full Happy Hour practice results

== Qualifying ==
Qualifying was originally scheduled to be split into two rounds. First-round qualifying was run on Friday, September 22m at 1:30 PM EST. Each driver would have one lap to set at time. Originally, the first round would lock in the top 25 drivers into the field. Second-round qualifying was scheduled to set the rest of the field; however, rain would force the cancellation of the second round, leading the field to be set by qualifying results from the first round. Positions 26-36 would be decided on time, while positions 37-43 would be based on provisionals. Six spots are awarded by the use of provisionals based on owner's points. The seventh is awarded to a past champion who has not otherwise qualified for the race. If no past champion needs the provisional, the next team in the owner points will be awarded a provisional.

Jeremy Mayfield, driving for Penske-Kranefuss Racing, would win the pole, setting a time of 22.518 and an average speed of 159.872 miles per hour (257.289 km/h) in the first round.

Two drivers would fail to qualify.

=== Full qualifying results ===
| Pos. | # | Driver | Team | Make | Time | Speed |
|---|---|---|---|---|---|---|
| 1 | 12 | Jeremy Mayfield | Penske-Kranefuss Racing | Ford | 22.518 | 159.872 |
| 2 | 14 | Rick Mast | A. J. Foyt Racing | Pontiac | 22.652 | 158.926 |
| 3 | 10 | Johnny Benson Jr. | MB2 Motorsports | Pontiac | 22.670 | 158.800 |
| 4 | 2 | Rusty Wallace | Penske-Kranefuss Racing | Ford | 22.694 | 158.632 |
| 5 | 6 | Mark Martin | Roush Racing | Ford | 22.725 | 158.416 |
| 6 | 22 | Ward Burton | Bill Davis Racing | Pontiac | 22.735 | 158.346 |
| 7 | 94 | Bill Elliott | Bill Elliott Racing | Ford | 22.741 | 158.304 |
| 8 | 88 | Dale Jarrett | Robert Yates Racing | Ford | 22.745 | 158.277 |
| 9 | 24 | Jeff Gordon | Hendrick Motorsports | Chevrolet | 22.773 | 158.082 |
| 10 | 97 | Kurt Busch | Roush Racing | Ford | 22.794 | 157.936 |
| 11 | 25 | Jerry Nadeau | Hendrick Motorsports | Chevrolet | 22.798 | 157.909 |
| 12 | 33 | Joe Nemechek | Andy Petree Racing | Chevrolet | 22.809 | 157.832 |
| 13 | 8 | Dale Earnhardt Jr. (R) | Dale Earnhardt, Inc. | Chevrolet | 22.817 | 157.777 |
| 14 | 28 | Ricky Rudd | Robert Yates Racing | Ford | 22.869 | 157.418 |
| 15 | 77 | Robert Pressley | Jasper Motorsports | Ford | 22.869 | 157.418 |
| 16 | 93 | Dave Blaney (R) | Bill Davis Racing | Pontiac | 22.875 | 157.377 |
| 17 | 18 | Bobby Labonte | Joe Gibbs Racing | Pontiac | 22.885 | 157.308 |
| 18 | 36 | Ken Schrader | MB2 Motorsports | Pontiac | 22.898 | 157.219 |
| 19 | 7 | Michael Waltrip | Ultra Motorsports | Chevrolet | 22.937 | 156.952 |
| 20 | 27 | Mike Bliss (R) | Eel River Racing | Pontiac | 22.937 | 156.952 |
| 21 | 99 | Jeff Burton | Roush Racing | Ford | 22.947 | 156.883 |
| 22 | 21 | Elliott Sadler | Wood Brothers Racing | Ford | 22.953 | 156.842 |
| 23 | 55 | Kenny Wallace | Andy Petree Racing | Chevrolet | 22.963 | 156.774 |
| 24 | 31 | Mike Skinner | Richard Childress Racing | Chevrolet | 22.984 | 156.631 |
| 25 | 5 | Terry Labonte | Hendrick Motorsports | Chevrolet | 22.984 | 156.631 |
| 26 | 26 | Jimmy Spencer | Haas-Carter Motorsports | Ford | 23.037 | 156.270 |
| 27 | 20 | Tony Stewart | Joe Gibbs Racing | Pontiac | 23.039 | 156.257 |
| 28 | 1 | Steve Park | Dale Earnhardt, Inc. | Chevrolet | 23.045 | 156.216 |
| 29 | 43 | John Andretti | Petty Enterprises | Pontiac | 23.080 | 155.979 |
| 30 | 16 | Kevin Lepage | Roush Racing | Ford | 23.099 | 155.851 |
| 31 | 17 | Matt Kenseth (R) | Roush Racing | Ford | 23.108 | 155.790 |
| 32 | 75 | Wally Dallenbach Jr. | Galaxy Motorsports | Ford | 23.114 | 155.750 |
| 33 | 01 | Ted Musgrave | Team SABCO | Chevrolet | 23.115 | 155.743 |
| 34 | 32 | Scott Pruett (R) | PPI Motorsports | Ford | 23.140 | 155.575 |
| 35 | 4 | Bobby Hamilton | Morgan–McClure Motorsports | Chevrolet | 23.162 | 155.427 |
| 36 | 66 | Darrell Waltrip | Haas-Carter Motorsports | Ford | 23.166 | 155.400 |
Provisionals
| 37 | 3 | Dale Earnhardt | Richard Childress Racing | Chevrolet | 23.249 | 154.845 |
| 38 | 40 | Sterling Marlin | Team SABCO | Chevrolet | 23.184 | 155.280 |
| 39 | 9 | Stacy Compton (R) | Melling Racing | Ford | 23.447 | 153.538 |
| 40 | 11 | Brett Bodine | Brett Bodine Racing | Ford | 23.410 | 153.780 |
| 41 | 71 | Dave Marcis | Marcis Auto Racing | Chevrolet | 23.350 | 154.176 |
| 42 | 85 | Carl Long | Mansion Motorsports | Ford | 23.907 | 150.584 |
| 43 | 44 | Steve Grissom | Petty Enterprises | Pontiac | 23.241 | 154.899 |
Failed to qualify
| 44 | 90 | Hut Stricklin | Donlavey Racing | Ford | 23.625 | 152.381 |
| 45 | 60 | Joe Bessey | Joe Bessey Racing | Chevrolet | 23.384 | 153.951 |
Official starting lineup

== Race results ==
| Fin | St | # | Driver | Team | Make | Laps | Led | Status | Pts | Winnings |
|---|---|---|---|---|---|---|---|---|---|---|
| 1 | 27 | 20 | Tony Stewart | Joe Gibbs Racing | Pontiac | 400 | 163 | running | 185 | $158,535 |
| 2 | 3 | 10 | Johnny Benson Jr. | MB2 Motorsports | Pontiac | 400 | 7 | running | 175 | $99,710 |
| 3 | 14 | 28 | Ricky Rudd | Robert Yates Racing | Ford | 400 | 1 | running | 170 | $93,160 |
| 4 | 28 | 1 | Steve Park | Dale Earnhardt, Inc. | Chevrolet | 400 | 0 | running | 160 | $81,010 |
| 5 | 17 | 18 | Bobby Labonte | Joe Gibbs Racing | Pontiac | 400 | 1 | running | 160 | $82,670 |
| 6 | 5 | 6 | Mark Martin | Roush Racing | Ford | 400 | 60 | running | 155 | $71,965 |
| 7 | 12 | 33 | Joe Nemechek | Andy Petree Racing | Chevrolet | 400 | 3 | running | 151 | $70,590 |
| 8 | 4 | 2 | Rusty Wallace | Penske-Kranefuss Racing | Ford | 400 | 0 | running | 142 | $67,590 |
| 9 | 9 | 24 | Jeff Gordon | Hendrick Motorsports | Chevrolet | 400 | 0 | running | 138 | $70,290 |
| 10 | 2 | 14 | Rick Mast | A. J. Foyt Racing | Pontiac | 399 | 0 | running | 134 | $55,990 |
| 11 | 24 | 31 | Mike Skinner | Richard Childress Racing | Chevrolet | 399 | 0 | running | 130 | $61,990 |
| 12 | 31 | 17 | Matt Kenseth (R) | Roush Racing | Ford | 399 | 0 | running | 127 | $64,440 |
| 13 | 25 | 5 | Terry Labonte | Hendrick Motorsports | Chevrolet | 399 | 0 | running | 124 | $63,490 |
| 14 | 15 | 77 | Robert Pressley | Jasper Motorsports | Ford | 399 | 0 | running | 121 | $49,190 |
| 15 | 23 | 55 | Kenny Wallace | Andy Petree Racing | Chevrolet | 399 | 0 | running | 118 | $61,090 |
| 16 | 13 | 8 | Dale Earnhardt Jr. (R) | Dale Earnhardt, Inc. | Chevrolet | 399 | 0 | running | 115 | $55,190 |
| 17 | 37 | 3 | Dale Earnhardt | Richard Childress Racing | Chevrolet | 398 | 0 | running | 112 | $63,390 |
| 18 | 10 | 97 | Kurt Busch | Roush Racing | Ford | 398 | 0 | running | 109 | $55,975 |
| 19 | 7 | 94 | Bill Elliott | Bill Elliott Racing | Ford | 398 | 9 | running | 111 | $55,690 |
| 20 | 40 | 11 | Brett Bodine | Brett Bodine Racing | Ford | 398 | 0 | running | 103 | $52,240 |
| 21 | 32 | 75 | Wally Dallenbach Jr. | Galaxy Motorsports | Ford | 397 | 0 | running | 100 | $47,290 |
| 22 | 29 | 43 | John Andretti | Petty Enterprises | Pontiac | 397 | 0 | running | 97 | $61,540 |
| 23 | 33 | 01 | Ted Musgrave | Team SABCO | Chevrolet | 397 | 0 | running | 94 | $54,890 |
| 24 | 19 | 7 | Michael Waltrip | Ultra Motorsports | Chevrolet | 397 | 0 | running | 91 | $54,640 |
| 25 | 35 | 4 | Bobby Hamilton | Morgan–McClure Motorsports | Chevrolet | 397 | 0 | running | 88 | $54,765 |
| 26 | 22 | 21 | Elliott Sadler | Wood Brothers Racing | Ford | 397 | 0 | running | 85 | $54,115 |
| 27 | 43 | 44 | Steve Grissom | Petty Enterprises | Pontiac | 394 | 0 | running | 82 | $53,865 |
| 28 | 41 | 71 | Dave Marcis | Marcis Auto Racing | Chevrolet | 390 | 0 | running | 79 | $42,590 |
| 29 | 39 | 9 | Stacy Compton (R) | Melling Racing | Ford | 388 | 0 | running | 76 | $45,440 |
| 30 | 18 | 36 | Ken Schrader | MB2 Motorsports | Pontiac | 377 | 1 | running | 78 | $45,290 |
| 31 | 36 | 66 | Darrell Waltrip | Haas-Carter Motorsports | Ford | 313 | 0 | engine | 70 | $45,115 |
| 32 | 8 | 88 | Dale Jarrett | Robert Yates Racing | Ford | 301 | 0 | running | 67 | $66,555 |
| 33 | 11 | 25 | Jerry Nadeau | Hendrick Motorsports | Chevrolet | 252 | 38 | crash | 69 | $49,805 |
| 34 | 26 | 26 | Jimmy Spencer | Haas-Carter Motorsports | Ford | 244 | 1 | engine | 66 | $49,655 |
| 35 | 1 | 12 | Jeremy Mayfield | Penske-Kranefuss Racing | Ford | 228 | 73 | engine | 63 | $55,505 |
| 36 | 21 | 99 | Jeff Burton | Roush Racing | Ford | 186 | 39 | crash | 60 | $61,375 |
| 37 | 38 | 40 | Sterling Marlin | Team SABCO | Chevrolet | 150 | 0 | engine | 52 | $49,250 |
| 38 | 30 | 16 | Kevin Lepage | Roush Racing | Ford | 120 | 0 | crash | 49 | $49,125 |
| 39 | 16 | 93 | Dave Blaney (R) | Bill Davis Racing | Pontiac | 98 | 4 | crash | 51 | $41,000 |
| 40 | 6 | 22 | Ward Burton | Bill Davis Racing | Pontiac | 25 | 0 | crash | 43 | $58,850 |
| 41 | 42 | 85 | Carl Long | Mansion Motorsports | Ford | 12 | 0 | crash | 40 | $40,725 |
| 42 | 34 | 32 | Scott Pruett (R) | PPI Motorsports | Ford | 11 | 0 | crash | 37 | $40,600 |
| 43 | 20 | 27 | Mike Bliss (R) | Eel River Racing | Pontiac | 2 | 0 | crash | 34 | $40,475 |
Failed to qualify
| 44 | | 90 | Hut Stricklin | Donlavey Racing | Ford | | | | | |
| 45 | | 60 | Joe Bessey | Joe Bessey Racing | Chevrolet | | | | | |
Official race results

| Previous race: 2000 Dura Lube 300 | NASCAR Winston Cup Series; 2000 season | Next race: 2000 NAPA Autocare 500 |
