= 2000 NAPA Autocare 500 =

28th race of the 2000 NASCAR Winston Cup Series

Race details
- Race 28 of 34 in the 2000 NASCAR Winston Cup Series
- The 2000 NAPA Autocare 500 program cover.
- Date: October 1, 2000
- Official name: 52nd Annual NAPA Autocare 500
- Location: Ridgeway, Virginia, Martinsville Speedway
- Course: Permanent racing facility
- Course length: 0.526 miles (0.847 km)
- Distance: 500 laps, 263 mi (423.257 km)
- Average speed: 73.859 miles per hour (118.865 km/h)

Pole position
Driver	Tony Stewart	Joe Gibbs Racing
- Time: 19.855

Most laps led
Driver	Jeff Burton	Roush Racing
- Laps: 202

Winner
No. 20	Tony Stewart	Joe Gibbs Racing

Television in the United States
- Network: ESPN
- Announcers: Bob Jenkins, Ned Jarrett, Benny Parsons

Radio in the United States
- Radio: Motor Racing Network

The 2000 NAPA Autocare 500 was the 28th stock car race of the 2000 NASCAR Winston Cup Series and the 52nd iteration of the event. The race was held on Sunday, October 1, 2000, in Ridgeway, Virginia, at Martinsville Speedway, a 0.526 miles (0.847 km) permanent oval-shaped short track. The race took the scheduled 500 laps to complete. At race's end, Tony Stewart, driving for Joe Gibbs Racing, would control the final restart with 11 laps to go to win his eighth career NASCAR Winston Cup Series win and his fifth of the season. To fill out the podium, Dale Earnhardt of Richard Childress Racing and Jeff Burton of Roush Racing would finish second and third, respectively.

== Background ==
The layout of Martinsville Speedway, the venue where the race was held.

Martinsville Speedway is a NASCAR-owned stock car racing track located in Henry County, in Ridgeway, Virginia, just to the south of Martinsville. At 0.526 miles (0.847 km) in length, it is the shortest track in the NASCAR Cup Series. The track was also one of the first paved oval tracks in NASCAR, being built in 1947 by H. Clay Earles. It is also the only remaining race track that has been on the NASCAR circuit from its beginning in 1948.

=== Entry list ===
- (R) denotes rookie driver.

#	Driver	Team	Make
1	Steve Park	Dale Earnhardt, Inc.	Chevrolet
01	Ted Musgrave	Team SABCO	Chevrolet
2	Rusty Wallace	Penske-Kranefuss Racing	Ford
3	Dale Earnhardt	Richard Childress Racing	Chevrolet
4	Bobby Hamilton	Morgan–McClure Motorsports	Chevrolet
5	Terry Labonte	Hendrick Motorsports	Chevrolet
6	Mark Martin	Roush Racing	Ford
7	Michael Waltrip	Mattei Motorsports	Chevrolet
8	Dale Earnhardt Jr. (R)	Dale Earnhardt, Inc.	Chevrolet
9	Stacy Compton (R)	Melling Racing	Ford
10	Johnny Benson Jr.	Tyler Jet Motorsports	Pontiac
11	Brett Bodine	Brett Bodine Racing	Ford
12	Jeremy Mayfield	Penske-Kranefuss Racing	Ford
14	Rick Mast	A. J. Foyt Enterprises	Pontiac
16	Kevin Lepage	Roush Racing	Ford
17	Matt Kenseth (R)	Roush Racing	Ford
18	Bobby Labonte	Joe Gibbs Racing	Pontiac
19	Casey Atwood	Evernham Motorsports	Ford
20	Tony Stewart	Joe Gibbs Racing	Pontiac
21	Elliott Sadler	Wood Brothers Racing	Ford
22	Ward Burton	Bill Davis Racing	Pontiac
24	Jeff Gordon	Hendrick Motorsports	Chevrolet
25	Jerry Nadeau	Hendrick Motorsports	Chevrolet
26	Jimmy Spencer	Haas-Carter Motorsports	Ford
27	Mike Bliss (R)	Eel River Racing	Pontiac
28	Ricky Rudd	Robert Yates Racing	Ford
31	Mike Skinner	Richard Childress Racing	Chevrolet
32	Scott Pruett (R)	PPI Motorsports	Ford
33	Joe Nemechek	Andy Petree Racing	Chevrolet
36	Ken Schrader	MB2 Motorsports	Pontiac
40	Sterling Marlin	Team SABCO	Chevrolet
43	John Andretti	Petty Enterprises	Pontiac
44	Steve Grissom	Petty Enterprises	Pontiac
45	Kyle Petty	Petty Enterprises	Pontiac
50	Ricky Craven	Midwest Transit Racing	Chevrolet
55	Kenny Wallace	Andy Petree Racing	Chevrolet
60	Rich Bickle	Joe Bessey Racing	Chevrolet
66	Darrell Waltrip	Haas-Carter Motorsports	Ford
71	Dave Marcis	Marcis Auto Racing	Chevrolet
75	Wally Dallenbach Jr.	Galaxy Motorsports	Ford
77	Robert Pressley	Jasper Motorsports	Ford
85	Carl Long	Mansion Motorsports	Ford
88	Dale Jarrett	Robert Yates Racing	Ford
90	Hut Stricklin	Donlavey Racing	Ford
93	Dave Blaney (R)	Bill Davis Racing	Pontiac
94	Bill Elliott	Bill Elliott Racing	Ford
97	Kurt Busch	Roush Racing	Ford
99	Jeff Burton	Roush Racing	Ford
Official entry list

== Practice ==
=== First practice ===
The first practice session was held on Friday, September 29, at 11:00 AM EST. The session would last for two hours and 30 minutes. Tony Stewart of Joe Gibbs Racing would set the fastest time in the session, with a lap of 19.810 and an average speed of 95.588 mph (153.834 km/h).

Pos.	#	Driver	Team	Make	Time	Speed
1	20	Tony Stewart	Joe Gibbs Racing	Pontiac	19.810	95.588
2	60	Rich Bickle	Joe Bessey Racing	Chevrolet	19.859	95.352
3	77	Robert Pressley	Jasper Motorsports	Ford	19.865	95.323
Full first practice results

=== Second practice ===
The second practice session was held on Saturday, September 30, at 9:40 AM EST. The session would last for 50 minutes. Steve Grissom of Petty Enterprises would set the fastest time in the session, with a lap of 20.126 and an average speed of 94.087 mph (151.418 km/h).

Pos.	#	Driver	Team	Make	Time	Speed
1	44	Steve Grissom	Petty Enterprises	Pontiac	20.126	94.087
2	60	Rich Bickle	Joe Bessey Racing	Chevrolet	20.129	94.073
3	50	Ricky Craven	Midwest Transit Racing	Chevrolet	20.148	93.984
Full second practice results

=== Third and final practice ===
The final practice session, sometimes referred to as Happy Hour, was held on Saturday, September 30, at 1:00 PM EST. The session would last for one hour. Ricky Craven of Midwest Transit Racing would set the fastest time in the session, with a lap of 20.186 and an average speed of 93.808 mph (150.969 km/h).

Pos.	#	Driver	Team	Make	Time	Speed
1	50	Ricky Craven	Midwest Transit Racing	Chevrolet	20.186	93.808
2	25	Jerry Nadeau	Hendrick Motorsports	Chevrolet	20.231	93.599
3	18	Bobby Labonte	Joe Gibbs Racing	Pontiac	20.241	93.553
Full Happy Hour practice results

== Qualifying ==
Qualifying was split into two rounds. The first round was held on Friday, September 29, at 3:00 PM EST. Each driver would have two laps to set a fastest time; the fastest of the two would count as their official qualifying lap. During the first round, the top 25 drivers in the round would be guaranteed a starting spot in the race. If a driver was not able to guarantee a spot in the first round, they had the option to scrub their time from the first round and try and run a faster lap time in a second round qualifying run, held on Saturday, September 30, at 11:15 AM EST. As with the first round, each driver would have two laps to set a fastest time; the fastest of the two would count as their official qualifying lap. Positions 26-36 would be decided on time, while positions 37-43 would be based on provisionals. Six spots are awarded by the use of provisionals based on owner's points. The seventh is awarded to a past champion who has not otherwise qualified for the race. If no past champion needs the provisional, the next team in the owner points will be awarded a provisional.

Tony Stewart of Joe Gibbs Racing would win the pole, setting a time of 19.855 and an average speed of 95.371 miles per hour (153.485 km/h).

Five drivers would fail to qualify: Scott Pruett, Steve Grissom, Carl Long, Dave Marcis, and Rich Bickle.

=== Full qualifying results ===
Pos.	#	Driver	Team	Make	Time	Speed
1	20	Tony Stewart (R)	Joe Gibbs Racing	Pontiac	19.855	95.371
2	2	Rusty Wallace	Penske-Kranefuss Racing	Ford	19.862	95.338
3	99	Jeff Burton	Roush Racing	Ford	19.866	95.319
4	22	Ward Burton	Bill Davis Racing	Pontiac	19.896	95.175
5	24	Jeff Gordon	Hendrick Motorsports	Chevrolet	19.898	95.165
6	55	Kenny Wallace	Andy Petree Racing	Chevrolet	19.905	95.132
7	4	Bobby Hamilton	Morgan–McClure Motorsports	Chevrolet	19.926	95.032
8	31	Mike Skinner	Richard Childress Racing	Chevrolet	19.928	95.022
9	11	Brett Bodine	Brett Bodine Racing	Ford	19.952	94.908
10	1	Steve Park	Dale Earnhardt, Inc.	Chevrolet	19.962	94.860
11	28	Ricky Rudd	Robert Yates Racing	Ford	19.964	94.851
12	3	Dale Earnhardt	Richard Childress Racing	Chevrolet	19.972	94.813
13	25	Jerry Nadeau	Hendrick Motorsports	Chevrolet	19.976	94.794
14	18	Bobby Labonte	Joe Gibbs Racing	Pontiac	19.978	94.784
15	01	Ted Musgrave	Team SABCO	Chevrolet	19.990	94.727
16	77	Robert Pressley	Jasper Motorsports	Ford	19.995	94.704
17	75	Wally Dallenbach Jr.	Galaxy Motorsports	Ford	20.000	94.680
18	66	Darrell Waltrip	Haas-Carter Motorsports	Ford	20.010	94.633
19	14	Rick Mast	A. J. Foyt Enterprises	Pontiac	20.012	94.623
20	94	Bill Elliott	Bill Elliott Racing	Ford	20.015	94.609
21	93	Dave Blaney	Bill Davis Racing	Pontiac	20.020	94.585
22	19	Casey Atwood	Evernham Motorsports	Ford	20.026	94.571
23	6	Mark Martin	Roush Racing	Ford	20.026	94.557
24	33	Joe Nemechek	Andy Petree Racing	Chevrolet	20.032	94.529
25	26	Jimmy Spencer	Haas-Carter Motorsports	Ford	20.037	94.505
26	27	Mike Bliss (R)	Eel River Racing	Pontiac	20.038	94.500
27	45	Kyle Petty	Petty Enterprises	Pontiac	20.040	94.491
28	43	John Andretti	Petty Enterprises	Pontiac	20.043	94.477
29	90	Hut Stricklin	Donlavey Racing	Ford	20.045	94.467
30	9	Stacy Compton (R)	Melling Racing	Ford	20.061	94.392
31	88	Dale Jarrett	Robert Yates Racing	Ford	20.081	94.298
32	8	Dale Earnhardt Jr. (R)	Dale Earnhardt, Inc.	Chevrolet	20.091	94.251
33	10	Johnny Benson Jr.	Tyler Jet Motorsports	Pontiac	20.098	94.218
34	40	Sterling Marlin	Team SABCO	Chevrolet	20.106	94.181
35	12	Jeremy Mayfield	Penske-Kranefuss Racing	Ford	20.117	94.129
36	50	Ricky Craven	Midwest Transit Racing	Chevrolet	20.137	94.036
Provisionals
37	17	Matt Kenseth (R)	Roush Racing	Ford	20.221	93.645
38	5	Terry Labonte	Hendrick Motorsports	Chevrolet	20.170	93.882
39	36	Ken Schrader	MB2 Motorsports	Pontiac	20.259	93.470
40	97	Kurt Busch	Roush Racing	Ford	20.238	93.567
41	16	Kevin Lepage	Roush Racing	Ford	20.156	93.947
42	7	Michael Waltrip	Mattei Motorsports	Chevrolet	20.187	93.803
43	21	Elliott Sadler	Wood Brothers Racing	Ford	20.617	91.847
Failed to qualify
44	32	Scott Pruett (R)	PPI Motorsports	Ford	20.173	93.868
45	44	Steve Grissom	Petty Enterprises	Pontiac	20.176	93.854
46	85	Carl Long	Mansion Motorsports	Ford	20.281	93.368
47	71	Dave Marcis	Marcis Auto Racing	Chevrolet	20.447	92.610
48	60	Rich Bickle	Joe Bessey Racing	Chevrolet	20.524	92.263
Official first round qualifying results
Official starting lineup

== Race results ==
Fin	St	#	Driver	Team	Make	Laps	Led	Status	Pts	Winnings
1	1	20	Tony Stewart (R)	Joe Gibbs Racing	Pontiac	500	179	running	180	$125,875
2	12	3	Dale Earnhardt	Richard Childress Racing	Chevrolet	500	0	running	170	$77,925
3	3	99	Jeff Burton	Roush Racing	Ford	500	202	running	175	$83,225
4	11	28	Ricky Rudd	Robert Yates Racing	Ford	500	37	running	165	$59,275
5	5	24	Jeff Gordon	Hendrick Motorsports	Chevrolet	500	0	running	155	$59,075
6	31	88	Dale Jarrett	Robert Yates Racing	Ford	500	0	running	150	$57,375
7	25	26	Jimmy Spencer	Haas-Carter Motorsports	Ford	500	0	running	146	$46,075
8	8	31	Mike Skinner	Richard Childress Racing	Chevrolet	500	0	running	142	$42,750
9	34	40	Sterling Marlin	Team SABCO	Chevrolet	500	27	running	143	$42,550
10	14	18	Bobby Labonte	Joe Gibbs Racing	Pontiac	500	0	running	134	$60,100
11	10	1	Steve Park	Dale Earnhardt, Inc.	Chevrolet	500	0	running	130	$39,185
12	13	25	Jerry Nadeau	Hendrick Motorsports	Chevrolet	500	0	running	127	$38,975
13	28	43	John Andretti	Petty Enterprises	Pontiac	500	0	running	124	$44,450
14	24	33	Joe Nemechek	Andy Petree Racing	Chevrolet	500	0	running	121	$37,825
15	20	94	Bill Elliott	Bill Elliott Racing	Ford	500	0	running	118	$39,625
16	39	36	Ken Schrader	MB2 Motorsports	Pontiac	499	0	running	115	$34,125
17	38	5	Terry Labonte	Hendrick Motorsports	Chevrolet	499	0	running	112	$43,125
18	23	6	Mark Martin	Roush Racing	Ford	499	0	running	109	$42,630
19	33	10	Johnny Benson Jr.	Tyler Jet Motorsports	Pontiac	499	0	running	106	$27,675
20	36	50	Ricky Craven	Midwest Transit Racing	Chevrolet	499	1	running	108	$28,175
21	15	01	Ted Musgrave	Team SABCO	Chevrolet	498	0	running	100	$35,675
22	6	55	Kenny Wallace	Andy Petree Racing	Chevrolet	498	0	running	97	$35,825
23	2	2	Rusty Wallace	Penske-Kranefuss Racing	Ford	498	53	running	99	$43,275
24	42	7	Michael Waltrip	Mattei Motorsports	Chevrolet	498	1	running	96	$34,525
25	22	19	Casey Atwood	Evernham Motorsports	Ford	497	0	running	88	$23,375
26	19	14	Rick Mast	A. J. Foyt Enterprises	Pontiac	497	0	running	85	$23,425
27	18	66	Darrell Waltrip	Haas-Carter Motorsports	Ford	497	0	running	82	$25,975
28	26	27	Mike Bliss (R)	Eel River Racing	Pontiac	496	0	running	79	$23,525
29	41	16	Kevin Lepage	Roush Racing	Ford	494	0	running	76	$33,575
30	21	93	Dave Blaney	Bill Davis Racing	Pontiac	494	0	running	73	$22,225
31	27	45	Kyle Petty	Petty Enterprises	Pontiac	486	0	drivetrain	70	$22,075
32	43	21	Elliott Sadler	Wood Brothers Racing	Ford	480	0	running	67	$33,550
33	16	77	Robert Pressley	Jasper Motorsports	Ford	458	0	crash	64	$24,825
34	37	17	Matt Kenseth (R)	Roush Racing	Ford	447	0	running	61	$32,700
35	7	4	Bobby Hamilton	Morgan–McClure Motorsports	Chevrolet	444	0	running	58	$32,075
36	32	8	Dale Earnhardt Jr. (R)	Dale Earnhardt, Inc.	Chevrolet	406	0	crash	55	$31,500
37	40	97	Kurt Busch	Roush Racing	Ford	396	0	running	52	$29,375
38	35	12	Jeremy Mayfield	Penske-Kranefuss Racing	Ford	393	0	overheating	49	$29,250
39	30	9	Stacy Compton (R)	Melling Racing	Ford	333	0	crash	46	$21,125
40	17	75	Wally Dallenbach Jr.	Galaxy Motorsports	Ford	329	0	brakes	43	$20,975
41	9	11	Brett Bodine	Brett Bodine Racing	Ford	317	0	overheating	40	$20,850
42	29	90	Hut Stricklin	Donlavey Racing	Ford	114	0	crash	37	$20,725
43	4	22	Ward Burton	Bill Davis Racing	Pontiac	61	0	engine	34	$39,100
Official race results

Previous race: 2000 MBNA.com 400	NASCAR Winston Cup Series; 2000 season	Next race: 2000 UAW-GM Quality 500
