= 1999 Checker Auto Parts/Dura Lube 500k =

32nd race of the 1999 NASCAR Winston Cup Series

Race details
- Race 32 of 34 in the 1999 NASCAR Winston Cup Series
- The 1999 Checker Auto Parts/Dura Lube 500k program cover.
- Date: November 7, 1999
- Official name: 12th Annual Checker Auto Parts 500/Dura Lube 500k
- Location: Avondale, Arizona, Phoenix International Raceway
- Course: Permanent racing facility
- Course length: 1 miles (1.6 km)
- Distance: 312 laps, 312 mi (502.115 km)
- Average speed: 118.132 miles per hour (190.115 km/h)
- Attendance: 78,000

Pole position
Driver	John Andretti	Petty Enterprises
- Time: 27.126

Most laps led
Driver	Tony Stewart	Joe Gibbs Racing
- Laps: 154

Winner
No. 20	Tony Stewart	Joe Gibbs Racing

Television in the United States
- Network: TNN
- Announcers: Eli Gold, Buddy Baker, Dick Berggren

Radio in the United States
- Radio: Motor Racing Network

The 1999 Checker Auto Parts/Dura Lube 500k was the 32nd stock car race of the 1999 NASCAR Winston Cup Series and the 12th iteration of the event. The race was held on Sunday, November 7, 1999, before an audience of 78,000 in Avondale, Arizona at Phoenix International Raceway, a 1-mile (1.6 km) permanent low-banked tri-oval race track. The race took the scheduled 312 laps to complete. Joe Gibbs Racing driver Tony Stewart would manage to dominate the late stages of the race to take his second career NASCAR Winston Cup Series victory and his second victory of the season. To fill out the podium, Roush Racing driver Mark Martin and Joe Gibbs Racing driver Bobby Labonte would finish second and third, respectively.

== Background ==
The layout of Phoenix International Raceway, the venue where the race was held.

Phoenix International Raceway is a one-mile, low-banked tri-oval race track located in Avondale, Arizona. It is named after the nearby metropolitan area of Phoenix. The motorsport track opened in 1964, and the raceway is currently owned and operated by NASCAR.

The raceway was originally constructed with a 2.5 mi (4.0 km) road course that ran both inside and outside of the main tri-oval. In 1991 the track was reconfigured with the current 1.51 mi (2.43 km) interior layout. PIR has an estimated grandstand seating capacity of around 67,000. Lights were installed around the track in 2004 following the addition of a second annual NASCAR race weekend.

=== Entry list ===
- (R) denotes rookie driver.

#	Driver	Team	Make
1	Steve Park	Dale Earnhardt, Inc.	Chevrolet
2	Rusty Wallace	Penske-Kranefuss Racing	Ford
3	Dale Earnhardt	Richard Childress Racing	Chevrolet
4	Bobby Hamilton	Morgan–McClure Motorsports	Chevrolet
5	Terry Labonte	Hendrick Motorsports	Chevrolet
6	Mark Martin	Roush Racing	Ford
7	Michael Waltrip	Mattei Motorsports	Chevrolet
9	Stacy Compton	Melling Racing	Ford
10	Ricky Rudd	Rudd Performance Motorsports	Ford
11	Brett Bodine	Brett Bodine Racing	Ford
12	Jeremy Mayfield	Penske-Kranefuss Racing	Ford
16	Kevin Lepage	Roush Racing	Ford
18	Bobby Labonte	Joe Gibbs Racing	Pontiac
20	Tony Stewart (R)	Joe Gibbs Racing	Pontiac
21	Elliott Sadler (R)	Wood Brothers Racing	Ford
22	Ward Burton	Bill Davis Racing	Pontiac
23	Jimmy Spencer	Haas-Carter Motorsports	Ford
24	Jeff Gordon	Hendrick Motorsports	Chevrolet
25	Wally Dallenbach Jr.	Hendrick Motorsports	Chevrolet
26	Johnny Benson Jr.	Roush Racing	Ford
28	Kenny Irwin Jr.	Robert Yates Racing	Ford
30	Todd Bodine	Bahari Racing	Pontiac
31	Mike Skinner	Richard Childress Racing	Chevrolet
32	Mike Wallace	Ultra Motorsports	Ford
33	Ken Schrader	Andy Petree Racing	Chevrolet
36	Jerry Nadeau	MB2 Motorsports	Pontiac
40	Sterling Marlin	Team SABCO	Chevrolet
41	Derrike Cope	Larry Hedrick Motorsports	Chevrolet
42	Joe Nemechek	Team SABCO	Chevrolet
43	John Andretti	Petty Enterprises	Pontiac
44	Kyle Petty	Petty Enterprises	Pontiac
45	David Green	Tyler Jet Motorsports	Pontiac
50	Ricky Craven	Midwest Transit Racing	Chevrolet
55	Kenny Wallace	Andy Petree Racing	Chevrolet
60	Geoff Bodine	Joe Bessey Racing	Chevrolet
66	Darrell Waltrip	Haas-Carter Motorsports	Ford
71	Dave Marcis	Marcis Auto Racing	Chevrolet
75	Ted Musgrave	Butch Mock Motorsports	Ford
77	Robert Pressley	Jasper Motorsports	Ford
88	Dale Jarrett	Robert Yates Racing	Ford
94	Bill Elliott	Bill Elliott Racing	Ford
97	Chad Little	Roush Racing	Ford
98	Rick Mast	Cale Yarborough Motorsports	Ford
99	Jeff Burton	Roush Racing	Ford
Official entry list

== Practice ==
=== First practice ===
The first practice session was held on Friday, November 5, at 10:30 AM MST. The session would last for one hour. Joe Nemechek, driving for Team SABCO, would set the fastest time in the session, with a lap of 27.245 and an average speed of 132.802 mph (213.724 km/h).

Pos.	#	Driver	Team	Make	Time	Speed
1	42	Joe Nemechek	Team SABCO	Chevrolet	27.245	132.134
2	33	Ken Schrader	Andy Petree Racing	Chevrolet	27.273	131.998
3	55	Kenny Wallace	Andy Petree Racing	Chevrolet	27.302	131.858
Full first practice results

=== Second practice ===
The second practice session was held on Friday, November 5 at 12:35 PM MST. The session would last for 40 minutes. Geoff Bodine, driving for Joe Bessey Racing, would set the fastest time in the session, with a lap of 27.203 and an average speed of 132.338 mph (212.977 km/h).

Pos.	#	Driver	Team	Make	Time	Speed
1	60	Geoff Bodine	Joe Bessey Racing	Chevrolet	27.203	132.338
2	6	Mark Martin	Roush Racing	Ford	27.256	132.081
3	43	John Andretti	Petty Enterprises	Pontiac	27.265	132.037
Full second practice results

=== Third practice ===
The third practice session was held on Saturday, November 6, at 9:00 AM MST. The session would last for one hour. Tony Stewart, driving for Joe Gibbs Racing, would set the fastest time in the session, with a lap of 27.843 and an average speed of 129.296 mph (208.082 km/h).

Pos.	#	Driver	Team	Make	Time	Speed
1	20	Tony Stewart (R)	Joe Gibbs Racing	Pontiac	27.843	129.296
2	43	John Andretti	Petty Enterprises	Pontiac	27.858	129.226
3	99	Jeff Burton	Roush Racing	Ford	27.936	128.865
Full third practice results

=== Final practice ===
The final practice session, sometimes referred to as Happy Hour, was held on Saturday, November 6, at 11:30 AM MST. The session would last for one hour. Mark Martin, driving for Roush Racing, would set the fastest time in the session, with a lap of 27.896 and an average speed of 129.050 mph (207.686 km/h).

Pos.	#	Driver	Team	Make	Time	Speed
1	6	Mark Martin	Roush Racing	Ford	27.896	129.050
2	18	Bobby Labonte	Joe Gibbs Racing	Pontiac	28.000	128.571
3	94	Bill Elliott	Bill Elliott Racing	Ford	28.019	128.484
Full Happy Hour practice results

== Qualifying ==
Qualifying was split into two rounds. The first round was held on Friday, November 5, at 3:15 PM MST. Each driver would have one lap to set a time. During the first round, the top 25 drivers in the round would be guaranteed a starting spot in the race. If a driver was not able to guarantee a spot in the first round, they had the option to scrub their time from the first round and try and run a faster lap time in a second round qualifying run, held on Saturday, November 6, at 10:45 AM MST. As with the first round, each driver would have one lap to set a time. Positions 26-36 would be decided on time, while positions 37-43 would be based on provisionals. Six spots are awarded by the use of provisionals based on owner's points. The seventh is awarded to a past champion who has not otherwise qualified for the race. If no past champion needs the provisional, the next team in the owner points will be awarded a provisional.

John Andretti, driving for Petty Enterprises, would win the pole, setting a time of 27.126 and an average speed of 132.714 miles per hour (213.582 km/h).

Mike Wallace was the only driver to fail to qualify.

=== Full qualifying results ===
Pos.	#	Driver	Team	Make	Time	Speed
1	43	John Andretti	Petty Enterprises	Pontiac	27.126	132.714
2	24	Jeff Gordon	Hendrick Motorsports	Chevrolet	27.135	132.670
3	60	Geoff Bodine	Joe Bessey Racing	Chevrolet	27.150	132.597
4	6	Mark Martin	Roush Racing	Ford	27.151	132.592
5	88	Dale Jarrett	Robert Yates Racing	Ford	27.157	132.563
6	18	Bobby Labonte	Joe Gibbs Racing	Pontiac	27.173	132.484
7	10	Ricky Rudd	Rudd Performance Motorsports	Ford	27.175	132.475
8	33	Ken Schrader	Andy Petree Racing	Chevrolet	27.181	132.445
9	2	Rusty Wallace	Penske-Kranefuss Racing	Ford	27.197	132.368
10	44	Kyle Petty	Petty Enterprises	Pontiac	27.230	132.207
11	20	Tony Stewart (R)	Joe Gibbs Racing	Pontiac	27.261	132.057
12	55	Kenny Wallace	Andy Petree Racing	Chevrolet	27.265	132.037
13	31	Mike Skinner	Richard Childress Racing	Chevrolet	27.277	131.979
14	3	Dale Earnhardt	Richard Childress Racing	Chevrolet	27.335	131.699
15	42	Joe Nemechek	Team SABCO	Chevrolet	27.364	131.560
16	23	Jimmy Spencer	Haas-Carter Motorsports	Ford	27.380	131.483
17	4	Bobby Hamilton	Morgan–McClure Motorsports	Chevrolet	27.384	131.464
18	99	Jeff Burton	Roush Racing	Ford	27.395	131.411
19	26	Johnny Benson Jr.	Roush Racing	Ford	27.397	131.401
20	30	Todd Bodine	Bahari Racing	Pontiac	27.418	131.301
21	98	Rick Mast	Cale Yarborough Motorsports	Ford	27.437	131.210
22	25	Wally Dallenbach Jr.	Hendrick Motorsports	Chevrolet	27.467	131.066
23	45	David Green	Tyler Jet Motorsports	Pontiac	27.489	130.961
24	11	Brett Bodine	Brett Bodine Racing	Ford	27.502	130.900
25	40	Sterling Marlin	Team SABCO	Chevrolet	27.503	130.895
26	1	Steve Park	Dale Earnhardt, Inc.	Chevrolet	27.506	130.881
27	28	Kenny Irwin Jr.	Robert Yates Racing	Ford	27.520	130.814
28	71	Dave Marcis	Marcis Auto Racing	Chevrolet	27.521	130.809
29	5	Terry Labonte	Hendrick Motorsports	Chevrolet	27.522	130.804
30	66	Darrell Waltrip	Haas-Carter Motorsports	Ford	27.530	130.766
31	50	Ricky Craven	Midwest Transit Racing	Chevrolet	27.542	130.709
32	94	Bill Elliott	Bill Elliott Racing	Ford	27.572	130.567
33	77	Robert Pressley	Jasper Motorsports	Ford	27.575	130.553
34	75	Ted Musgrave	Butch Mock Motorsports	Ford	27.589	130.487
35	36	Jerry Nadeau	MB2 Motorsports	Pontiac	27.599	130.440
36	12	Jeremy Mayfield	Penske-Kranefuss Racing	Ford	27.654	130.180
Provisionals
37	22	Ward Burton	Bill Davis Racing	Pontiac	-*	-*
38	16	Kevin Lepage	Roush Racing	Ford	-*	-*
39	97	Chad Little	Roush Racing	Ford	-*	-*
40	21	Elliott Sadler (R)	Wood Brothers Racing	Ford	-*	-*
41	7	Michael Waltrip	Mattei Motorsports	Chevrolet	-*	-*
42	9	Stacy Compton	Melling Racing	Ford	-*	-*
43	41	Derrike Cope	Larry Hedrick Motorsports	Chevrolet	-*	-*
Failed to qualify
44	32	Mike Wallace	Ultra Motorsports	Ford	27.782	129.580
Official starting lineup

== Race results ==
Fin	St	#	Driver	Team	Make	Laps	Led	Status	Pts	Winnings
1	11	20	Tony Stewart (R)	Joe Gibbs Racing	Pontiac	312	154	running	185	$168,485
2	4	6	Mark Martin	Roush Racing	Ford	312	8	running	175	$125,200
3	6	18	Bobby Labonte	Joe Gibbs Racing	Pontiac	312	2	running	170	$105,450
4	18	99	Jeff Burton	Roush Racing	Ford	312	0	running	160	$90,535
5	7	10	Ricky Rudd	Rudd Performance Motorsports	Ford	312	0	running	155	$86,240
6	5	88	Dale Jarrett	Robert Yates Racing	Ford	312	50	running	155	$82,475
7	10	44	Kyle Petty	Petty Enterprises	Pontiac	312	0	running	146	$61,425
8	1	43	John Andretti	Petty Enterprises	Pontiac	312	97	running	147	$75,775
9	22	25	Wally Dallenbach Jr.	Hendrick Motorsports	Chevrolet	312	0	running	138	$55,850
10	2	24	Jeff Gordon	Hendrick Motorsports	Chevrolet	312	0	running	134	$78,465
11	14	3	Dale Earnhardt	Richard Childress Racing	Chevrolet	312	0	running	130	$57,225
12	23	45	David Green	Tyler Jet Motorsports	Pontiac	311	0	running	127	$43,775
13	37	22	Ward Burton	Bill Davis Racing	Pontiac	311	0	running	124	$52,375
14	8	33	Ken Schrader	Andy Petree Racing	Chevrolet	311	0	running	121	$48,975
15	26	1	Steve Park	Dale Earnhardt, Inc.	Chevrolet	311	1	running	123	$47,650
16	39	97	Chad Little	Roush Racing	Ford	311	0	running	115	$48,090
17	16	23	Jimmy Spencer	Haas-Carter Motorsports	Ford	311	0	running	112	$45,650
18	12	55	Kenny Wallace	Andy Petree Racing	Chevrolet	311	0	running	109	$38,925
19	15	42	Joe Nemechek	Team SABCO	Chevrolet	311	0	running	106	$45,025
20	13	31	Mike Skinner	Richard Childress Racing	Chevrolet	311	0	running	103	$47,965
21	27	28	Kenny Irwin Jr.	Robert Yates Racing	Ford	310	0	running	100	$44,975
22	3	60	Geoff Bodine	Joe Bessey Racing	Chevrolet	310	0	running	97	$37,650
23	17	4	Bobby Hamilton	Morgan–McClure Motorsports	Chevrolet	310	0	running	94	$47,925
24	38	16	Kevin Lepage	Roush Racing	Ford	310	0	running	91	$44,275
25	20	30	Todd Bodine	Bahari Racing	Pontiac	310	0	running	88	$33,650
26	30	66	Darrell Waltrip	Haas-Carter Motorsports	Ford	310	0	running	85	$36,625
27	40	21	Elliott Sadler (R)	Wood Brothers Racing	Ford	310	0	running	82	$43,700
28	29	5	Terry Labonte	Hendrick Motorsports	Chevrolet	310	0	running	79	$48,275
29	34	75	Ted Musgrave	Butch Mock Motorsports	Ford	310	0	running	76	$36,150
30	31	50	Ricky Craven	Midwest Transit Racing	Chevrolet	310	0	running	73	$33,250
31	19	26	Johnny Benson Jr.	Roush Racing	Ford	309	0	running	70	$42,400
32	9	2	Rusty Wallace	Penske-Kranefuss Racing	Ford	309	0	running	67	$48,775
33	41	7	Michael Waltrip	Mattei Motorsports	Chevrolet	308	0	running	64	$39,650
34	28	71	Dave Marcis	Marcis Auto Racing	Chevrolet	308	0	running	61	$32,525
35	32	94	Bill Elliott	Bill Elliott Racing	Ford	308	0	running	58	$39,400
36	21	98	Rick Mast	Cale Yarborough Motorsports	Ford	308	0	running	55	$32,275
37	35	36	Jerry Nadeau	MB2 Motorsports	Pontiac	308	0	running	52	$39,150
38	33	77	Robert Pressley	Jasper Motorsports	Ford	307	0	running	49	$32,025
39	42	9	Stacy Compton	Melling Racing	Ford	306	0	running	46	$32,400
40	25	40	Sterling Marlin	Team SABCO	Chevrolet	264	0	running	43	$38,775
41	36	12	Jeremy Mayfield	Penske-Kranefuss Racing	Ford	260	0	steering	40	$46,650
42	24	11	Brett Bodine	Brett Bodine Racing	Ford	251	0	running	37	$38,525
43	43	41	Derrike Cope	Larry Hedrick Motorsports	Chevrolet	202	0	engine	34	$31,600
Official race results

Previous race: 1999 Pop Secret Microwave Popcorn 400	NASCAR Winston Cup Series; 1999 season	Next race: 1999 Pennzoil 400
