= 1999 Winston 500 =

Race details
- Race 30 of 34 in the 1999 NASCAR Sprint Cup Series
- 1999 Winston 500 program cover
- Date: October 17, 1999
- Official name: 1999 Winston 500
- Location: Talladega Superspeedway
- Course: Permanent racing facility
- Course length: 2.66 miles (4.281 km)
- Distance: 188 laps, 500.08 mi (804.801 km)
- Average speed: 166.632 mph
- Attendance: 100,000

Pole position
Driver	Joe Nemechek	
- Time: 48.283 secs

Most laps led
Driver	Jeff Gordon	Hendrick Motorsports
- Laps: 71

Winner
No. 3	Dale Earnhardt	Richard Childress Racing

Television in the United States
- Network: ESPN
- Announcers: Benny Parsons, Ned Jarrett, Jerry Punch

Radio in the United States
- Radio: Motor Racing Network

The 1999 Winston 500 was the 30th race of the 1999 NASCAR Winston Cup Series season, held on Talladega Superspeedway over 188 laps. Dale Earnhardt would collect his second to last Talladega win in this race.

== Entry list ==
Car	Driver	Team	Manufacturer	Sponsor
1	Steve Park	Dale Earnhardt, Inc.	Chevrolet	Pennzoil
01	Steve Grissom	SABCO Racing	Chevrolet	Tracfone
2	Rusty Wallace	Penske-Kranefuss Racing	Ford	Miller Lite
3	Dale Earnhardt Sr.	Richard Childress Racing	Chevrolet	GM Goodwrench Service Plus
4	Bobby Hamilton	Morgan-McClure Motorsports	Chevrolet	Kodak
5	Terry Labonte	Hendrick Motorsports	Chevrolet	Kellogg's
6	Mark Martin	Roush Racing	Ford	Zerex, Valvoline
7	Michael Waltrip	Mattei Motorsports	Chevrolet	Philips Electronics
9	Rich Bickle	Melling Racing	Ford	Cartoon Network, The Jetsons
10	Ricky Rudd	Rudd Performance Motorsports	Ford	Tide
11	Brett Bodine	Brett Bodine Racing	Ford	Paychex
12	Jeremy Mayfield	Penske-Kranefuss Racing	Ford	Mobil 1
16	Kevin Lepage	Roush Racing	Ford	TV Guide, Pokémon
18	Bobby Labonte	Joe Gibbs Racing	Pontiac	Interstate Batteries
20	Tony Stewart	Joe Gibbs Racing	Toyota	Home Depot
21	Elliott Sadler	Wood Brothers Racing	Ford	Citgo
22	Ward Burton	Bill Davis Racing	Pontiac	Caterpillar
23	Jimmy Spencer	Travis Carter Enterprises	Ford	Team Winston
24	Jeff Gordon	Hendrick Motorsports	Chevrolet	DuPont Automotive Finishes
25	Wally Dallenbach Jr.	Hendrick Motorsports	Chevrolet	Budweiser, MLB World Series
26	Johnny Benson Jr.	Roush Racing	Ford	Cheerios
28	Kenny Irwin Jr.	Robert Yates Racing	Ford	Texaco, Havoline
30	Buckshot Jones	Eel River Racing	Pontiac	Jimmy Dean
31	Mike Skinner	Richard Childress Racing	Chevrolet	Lowe's
33	Ken Schrader	Andy Petree Racing	Chevrolet	Skoal
36	Jerry Nadeau	MB2 Motorsports	Pontiac	M&M's Crispy
40	Sterling Marlin	SABCO Racing	Chevrolet	Coors Light, Brooks & Dunn
41	Derrike Cope	Larry Hedrick Motorsports	Chevrolet	Kodiak
42	Joe Nemechek	SABCO Racing	Chevrolet	BellSouth Prepaid Phone Card
43	John Andretti	Petty Enterprises	Dodge	STP
44	Kyle Petty	Petty Enterprises	Pontiac	Hot Wheels
45	David Green	Tyler Jet Motorsports	Pontiac	10-10-345
55	Kenny Wallace	Andy Petree Racing	Chevrolet	Square D
58	Hut Stricklin	SBIII Motorsports	Ford	Turbine Solutions
60	Geoff Bodine	Joe Bessey Motorsports	Chevrolet	Power Team
66	Darrell Waltrip	Haas-Carter Motorsports	Ford	Big Kmart / Route 66
71	Dave Marcis	Marcis Auto Racing	Chevrolet	Realtree
75	Ted Musgrave	Butch Mock Motorsports	Ford	Remington Arms
77	Robert Pressley	Jasper Motorsports	Ford	Jasper Engines & Transmissions
88	Dale Jarrett	Robert Yates Racing	Ford	Quality Care, Ford Credit
89	Bobby Gerhart	Gerhart Racing	Chevrolet	Greektown Casino
90	Ed Berrier	Donlavey Racing	Ford	Hills Brothers Coffee, Nestle NesQuik
91	Andy Hillenburg	LJ Racing	Chevrolet	Little Joe's Autos
94	Bill Elliott	Bill Elliott Racing	Ford	McDonald's
97	Chad Little	Roush Racing	Ford	John Deere
98	Rick Mast	Cale Yarborough Motorsports	Ford	Woody Woodpecker
99	Jeff Burton	Roush Racing	Ford	Exide Batteries

== Qualifying ==
Pos.	Driver	#	Make	Time	Avg. Speed (mph)
1	Joe Nemechek	42	Chevrolet	48.283	198.331
2	Ricky Rudd	10	Ford	48.299	198.265
3	Kenny Wallace	55	Chevrolet	48.360	198.015
4	Ken Schrader	33	Chevrolet	48.521	197.358
5	Tony Stewart	20	Pontiac	48.581	197.114
6	Sterling Marlin	40	Chevrolet	48.609	197.001
7	Wally Dallenbach, Jr.	25	Chevrolet	48.653	196.822
8	Terry Labonte	5	Chevrolet	48.751	196.427
9	Mark Martin	6	Ford	48.792	196.262
10	Rusty Wallace	2	Ford	48.792	196.262
11	Bobby Labonte	18	Pontiac	48.797	196.242
12	Michael Waltrip	7	Chevrolet	48.810	196.189
13	Ward Burton	22	Pontiac	48.874	195.932
14	Jeff Gordon	24	Chevrolet	48.926	195.724
15	Jeremy Mayfield	12	Ford	48.938	195.676
16	Jeff Burton	99	Ford	49.005	195.409
17	Dale Jarrett	88	Ford	19.008	195.397
18	Kevin Lepage	16	Ford	49.035	195.289
19	Steve Grissom	01	Chevrolet	49.052	195.221
20	Kenny Irwin, Jr.	28	Ford	49.107	195.003
21	Johnny Benson, Jr.	26	Ford	49.134	194.896
22	Chad Little	97	Ford	49.144	194.856
23	Bobby Hamilton	4	Chevrolet	49.156	194.808
24	Jerry Nadeau	36	Pontiac	49.168	194.761
25	Dave Marcis	71	Chevrolet	49.181	194.709
26	Mike Skinner	31	Chevrolet	48.744	196.455
27	Dale Earnhardt	3	Chevrolet	49.011	195.385
28	David Green	45	Pontiac	49.209	194.599
29	Derrike Cope	41	Chevrolet	49.216	194.571
30	Ted Musgrave	75	Ford	49.259	194.401
31	Kyle Petty	44	Pontiac	49.261	194.393
32	Rich Bickle	9	Ford	49.273	194.346
33	Andy Hillenburg	91	Chevrolet	49.273	194.346
34	Elliott Sadler	21	Ford	49.319	194.165
35	Steve Park	1	Ford	49.321	194.157
36	John Andretti	43	Pontiac	49.329	194.125
Provisionals
37	Jimmy Spencer	23	Ford		
38	Bill Elliott	94	Ford		
39	Geoffrey Bodine	60	Chevrolet		
40	Rick Mast	98	Ford		
41	Brett Bodine	11	Ford		
42	Buckshot Jones	30	Pontiac		
43	Ed Berrier	90	Ford		
Failed to qualify
44	Bobby Gerhart	89	Chevrolet	49.571	193.177
45	Robert Pressley	77	Ford	50.016	191.459
46	Darrell Waltrip	66	Ford	50.019	191.447
47	Hut Stricklin	58	Ford	50.268	190.499

PR: provisional

Failed to qualify, withdrew, or driver changes: Bobby Gerhart (#89), Robert Pressley (#77), Darrell Waltrip (#66), Hut Stricklin (#58)

== Results ==
Fin	St	#	Driver	Sponsor	Make	Team	Laps	Led	Status	Pts	Winnings
1	27	3	Dale Earnhardt	GM Goodwrench Service Plus	Chevrolet	Richard Childress Racing	188	18	running	180	120290
2	17	88	Dale Jarrett	Quality Care, Ford Credit	Ford	Robert Yates Racing	188	37	running	175	85345
3	2	10	Ricky Rudd	Tide	Ford	Rudd Performance Motorsports	188	7	running	170	82235
4	13	22	Ward Burton	Caterpillar	Pontiac	Bill Davis Racing	188	0	running	160	72200
5	3	55	Kenny Wallace	Square D	Chevrolet	Andy Petree Racing	188	0	running	155	58065
6	5	20	Tony Stewart	Home Depot	Pontiac	Joe Gibbs Racing	188	1	running	155	60875
7	11	18	Bobby Labonte	Interstate Batteries	Pontiac	Joe Gibbs Racing	188	17	running	151	56675
8	16	99	Jeff Burton	Exide Batteries	Ford	Roush Racing	188	0	running	142	56725
9	23	4	Bobby Hamilton	Kodak	Chevrolet	Morgan-McClure Motorsports	188	0	running	138	51795
10	20	28	Kenny Irwin, Jr.	Texaco, Havoline	Ford	Robert Yates Racing	188	0	running	134	57065
11	10	2	Rusty Wallace	Miller Lite	Ford	Penske-Kranefuss Racing	188	1	running	135	51655
12	14	24	Jeff Gordon	DuPont Automotive Finishes	Chevrolet	Hendrick Motorsports	188	71	running	137	75675
13	26	31	Mike Skinner	Lowe's	Chevrolet	Richard Childress Racing	188	2	running	129	47255
14	35	1	Steve Park	Pennzoil	Chevrolet	Dale Earnhardt, Inc.	188	0	running	121	46185
15	9	6	Mark Martin	Zerex, Valvoline	Ford	Roush Racing	188	0	running	118	53710
16	15	12	Jeremy Mayfield	Mobil 1	Ford	Penske-Kranefuss Racing	188	0	running	115	49675
17	28	45	David Green	10-10-345	Pontiac	Tyler Jet Motorsports	188	0	running	112	39850
18	18	16	Kevin Lepage	TV Guide, Pokemon	Ford	Roush Racing	188	0	running	109	45805
19	31	44	Kyle Petty	Hot Wheels	Pontiac	Petty Enterprises	188	0	running	106	38025
20	38	94	Bill Elliott	McDonald's	Ford	Bill Elliott Racing	188	0	running	103	46450
21	34	21	Elliott Sadler	Citgo	Ford	Wood Brothers Racing	188	0	running	100	46405
22	6	40	Sterling Marlin	Coors Light, Brooks & Dunn	Chevrolet	SABCO Racing	187	10	running	102	44175
23	39	60	Geoffrey Bodine	Power Team	Chevrolet	Joe Bessey Motorsports	187	1	running	99	39895
24	37	23	Jimmy Spencer	Team Winston	Ford	Travis Carter Enterprises	187	0	running	91	43615
25	4	33	Ken Schrader	Skoal	Chevrolet	Andy Petree Racing	187	1	running	93	43435
26	40	98	Rick Mast	Woody Woodpecker	Ford	Cale Yarborough Motorsports	187	0	running	85	36435
27	42	30	Buckshot Jones	Jimmy Dean	Pontiac	Eel River Racing	187	0	running	82	32915
28	19	01	Steve Grissom	Tracfone	Chevrolet	SABCO Racing	187	0	running	79	32845
29	30	75	Ted Musgrave	Remington Arms	Ford	Butch Mock Motorsports	187	0	running	76	36150
30	1	42	Joe Nemechek	BellSouth Prepaid Phone Card	Chevrolet	SABCO Racing	187	1	running	78	48930
31	41	11	Brett Bodine	Paychex	Ford	Brett Bodine Racing	185	1	running	75	42115
32	36	43	John Andretti	STP	Pontiac	Petty Enterprises	185	0	running	67	47545
33	43	90	Ed Berrier, III	Hills Brothers Coffee, Nestle NesQuik	Ford	Donlavey Racing	184	0	running	64	32465
34	8	5	Terry Labonte	Kellogg's	Chevrolet	Hendrick Motorsports	181	12	running	66	51020
35	7	25	Wally Dallenbach, Jr.	Budweiser, MLB World Series	Chevrolet	Hendrick Motorsports	170	3	steering	63	39395
36	22	97	Chad Little	John Deere	Ford	Roush Racing	168	0	running	55	39360
37	29	41	Derrike Cope	Kodiak	Chevrolet	Larry Hedrick Motorsports	167	0	running	52	32325
38	25	71	Dave Marcis	Realtree	Chevrolet	Marcis Auto Racing	166	0	running	49	32275
39	12	7	Michael Waltrip	Philips Electronics	Chevrolet	Mattei Motorsports	154	5	engine	51	39225
40	24	36	Jerry Nadeau	M&M's Crispy	Pontiac	MB2 Motorsports	84	0	crash	43	39175
41	32	9	Rich Bickle	Cartoon Network, The Jetsons	Ford	Melling Racing	83	0	crash	40	32125
42	21	26	Johnny Benson, Jr.	Cheerios	Ford	Roush Racing	81	0	crash	37	39075
43	33	91	Andy Hillenburg	Little Joe's Autos	Chevrolet	LJ Racing	50	0	crash	34	32736
Failed to qualify
44		89	Bobby Gerhart	Greektown Casino	Chevrolet	Gerhart Racing					
45		77	Robert Pressley	Jasper Engines & Transmissions	Ford	Jasper Motorsports					
46		66	Darrell Waltrip	Big Kmart / Route 66	Ford	Haas-Carter Motorsports					
47		58	Hut Stricklin	Turbine Solutions	Ford	SBIII Motorsports					

== Media ==
=== Television ===
The race was aired live on ESPN. Jerry Punch, 1973 Cup Series champion Benny Parsons and two-time NASCAR Cup Series champion Ned Jarrett called the race from the broadcast booth. Punch filled in for regular commentator Bob Jenkins, who was due to lead the commentary team but had to head home when his mum passed away over the weekend. Bill Weber, John Kernan and Ray Dunlap handled pit road for the television side.

ESPN
Booth announcers		Pit reporters
Lap-by-lap	Color-commentators	Pit reporters
Jerry Punch	Ned Jarrett; Benny Parsons	Bill Weber; John Kernan; Ray Dunlap
