= List of NASCAR race wins by Joe Gibbs Racing =

Wins by Joe Gibbs Racing

Joe Gibbs Racing is an American professional stock car racing organization owned and operated by former Washington Redskins coach Joe Gibbs, which first started racing on the NASCAR circuit in 1991. His son, J. D. Gibbs, ran the team with him until his death in 2019. Headquartered in Huntersville, North Carolina, roughly 10 miles (16 km) northwest of Charlotte Motor Speedway, the team has amassed five Cup Series championships since the year 2000.

For the team's first sixteen seasons, Gibbs ran cars from General Motors. During that period, the team won their first three championships: two in Pontiac Grand Prixs and one in a Chevrolet Monte Carlo. Despite this, Joe Gibbs Racing announced during the 2007 season that they would be ending their arrangement with GM at the end of the year and begin running Toyotas the following season. This partnership would eventually bring Toyota their first Cup Series championship with Kyle Busch in 2015. Along with five Cup Series championships, Gibbs has also won four O'Reilly Auto Parts Series drivers' championships and one ARCA Racing Series crown. The team has amassed 237 NASCAR Cup Series victories, 225 O'Reilly Auto Parts Series wins, 53 ARCA Menards Series wins, 24 ARCA Menards Series East wins, and 9 ARCA Menards Series West victories.

In the NASCAR Cup Series, the team currently fields four full-time entries with the Toyota Camry: the No. 11 for Denny Hamlin, the No. 19 for Chase Briscoe, the No. 20 for Christopher Bell, and the No. 54 for Ty Gibbs. In the O'Reilly Auto Parts Series, the team currently fields three full-time entries with the Toyota Supra: the No. 18 for William Sawalich, the No. 19 for multiple drivers, the No. 20 for Brandon Jones, and the No. 54 for Taylor Gray. The team has fielded Cup and Xfinity cars in the past for many NASCAR drivers, including Hall of Famers Dale Jarrett, Tony Stewart, Bobby Labonte, and Matt Kenseth, and others such as Kyle Busch, Carl Edwards, J. J. Yeley, Jason Leffler, Erik Jones, Daniel Suárez, Joey Logano, Daniel Hemric, Brian Vickers, Brian Scott, Elliott Sadler, Harrison Burton, Riley Herbst, John Hunter Nemechek, Ryan Truex, Coy Gibbs, Mike McLaughlin, and Mike Bliss.

== Cup Series ==
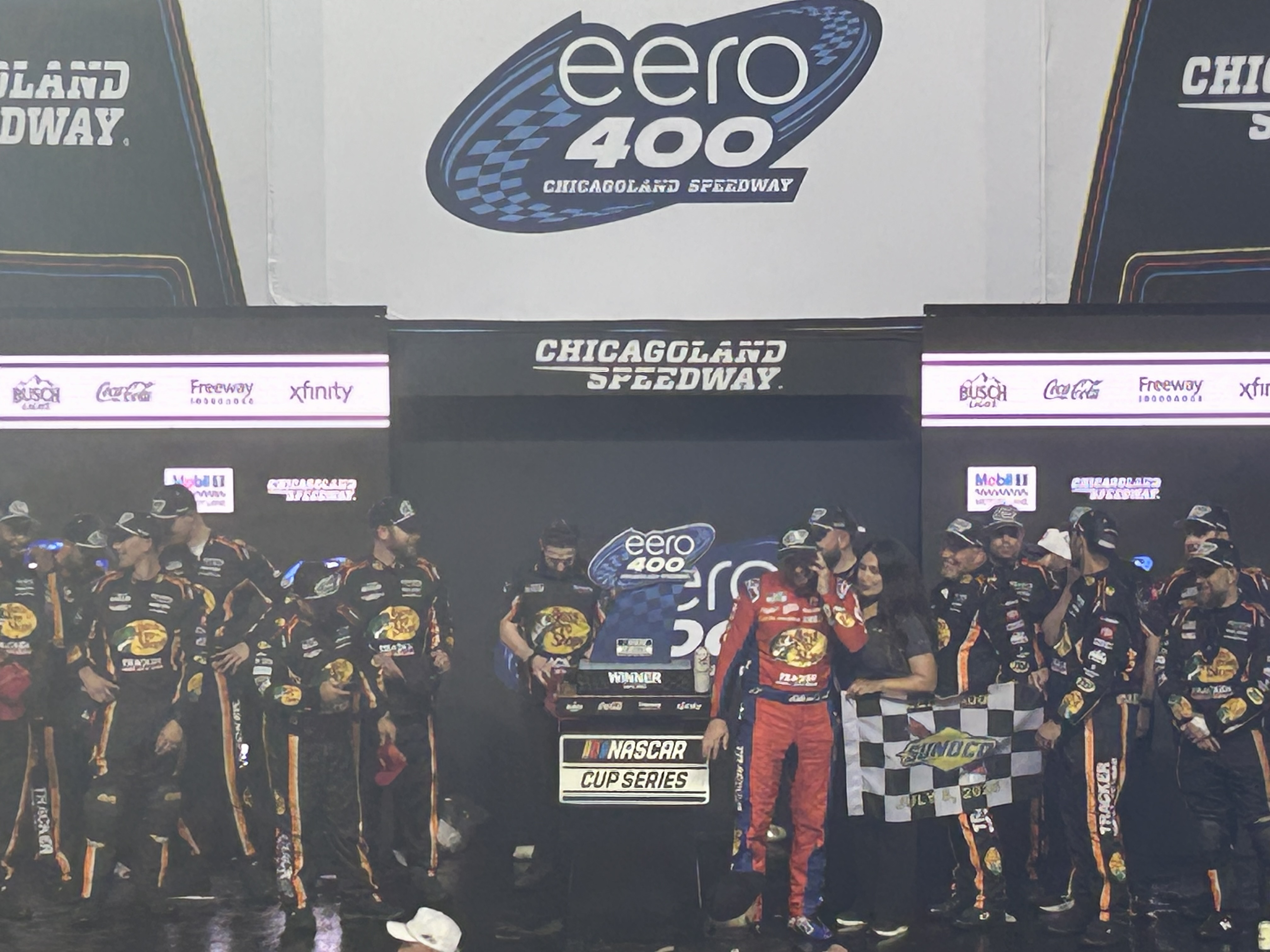
Chase Briscoe celebrating his eero 400 win at Chicagoland Speedway.

In the NASCAR Cup Series, which has been sponsored by Winston, Nextel, Sprint, and Monster Energy during the existence of Joe Gibbs Racing, the team has won 237 races and five championships. It has won at least one race each year since its inception except its first season in 1992. In 2019, Gibbs set a team record for wins in a single season, winning 19 of 36 races, besting Hendrick Motorsports' record of 18 from 2007. The team currently sits third to Hendrick Motorsports and Petty Enterprises in total Cup Series wins for a single organization.

=== Cup Series wins ===
. – Gibbs won driver's championship

NASCAR Cup Series victories
No.	Date	Season	Car #	Driver	Race	Track
1	February 14, 1993	1993	18	Dale Jarrett	Daytona 500	Daytona International Speedway
2	October 9, 1994	1994	18	Dale Jarrett	Mello Yello 500	Charlotte Motor Speedway
3	May 28, 1995	1995	18	Bobby Labonte	Coca-Cola 600	Charlotte Motor Speedway
4	June 18, 1995	1995	18	Bobby Labonte	Miller Genuine Draft 400	Michigan International Speedway
5	August 20, 1995	1995	18	Bobby Labonte	GM Goodwrench Dealer 400	Michigan International Speedway
6	November 10, 1996	1996	18	Bobby Labonte	NAPA 500	Atlanta Motor Speedway
7	November 16, 1997	1997	18	Bobby Labonte	NAPA 500	Atlanta Motor Speedway
8	March 9, 1998	1998	18	Bobby Labonte	Primestar 500	Atlanta Motor Speedway
9	April 26, 1998	1998	18	Bobby Labonte	DieHard 500	Talladega Superspeedway
10	June 6, 1999	1999	18	Bobby Labonte	MBNA Platinum 400	Dover Downs International Speedway
11	June 20, 1999	1999	18	Bobby Labonte	Pocono 500	Pocono Raceway
12	July 25, 1999	1999	18	Bobby Labonte	Pennsylvania 500	Pocono Raceway
13	August 22, 1999	1999	18	Bobby Labonte	Pepsi 400 Presented by Meijer	Michigan Speedway
14	September 11, 1999	1999	20	Tony Stewart	Exide NASCAR Select Batteries 400	Richmond International Raceway
15	November 7, 1999	1999	20	Tony Stewart	Checker Auto Parts/Dura Lube 500	Phoenix International Raceway
16	November 14, 1999	1999	20	Tony Stewart	Pennzoil 400	Homestead–Miami Speedway
17	November 21, 1999	1999	18	Bobby Labonte	NAPA 500	Atlanta Motor Speedway
18	February 27, 2000	2000	18	Bobby Labonte	Dura Lube/Kmart 400	North Carolina Speedway
19	June 4, 2000	2000	20	Tony Stewart	MBNA Platinum 400	Dover Downs International Speedway
20	June 11, 2000	2000	20	Tony Stewart	Kmart 400	Michigan Speedway
21	July 9, 2000	2000	20	Tony Stewart	thatlook.com 300	New Hampshire International Speedway
22	August 5, 2000	2000	18	Bobby Labonte	Brickyard 400	Indianapolis Motor Speedway
23	September 3, 2000	2000	18	Bobby Labonte	Pepsi Southern 500	Darlington Raceway
24	September 24, 2000	2000	20	Tony Stewart	MBNA.com 400	Dover Downs International Speedway
25	October 1, 2000	2000	20	Tony Stewart	NAPA Autocare 500	Martinsville Speedway
26	October 8, 2000	2000	18	Bobby Labonte	UAW-GM Quality 500	Lowe's Motor Speedway
27	November 12, 2000	2000	20	Tony Stewart	Pennzoil 400	Homestead–Miami Speedway
28	May 5, 2001	2001	20	Tony Stewart	Pontiac Excitement 400	Richmond International Raceway
29	June 24, 2001	2001	20	Tony Stewart	Dodge/Save Mart 350	Sears Point Raceway
30	July 29, 2001	2001	18	Bobby Labonte	Pennsylvania 500	Pocono Raceway
31	August 25, 2001	2001	20	Tony Stewart	Sharpie 500	Bristol Motor Speedway
32	November 18, 2001	2001	18	Bobby Labonte	NAPA 500	Atlanta Motor Speedway
33	March 10, 2002	2002	20	Tony Stewart	MBNA America 500	Atlanta Motor Speedway
34	April 14, 2002	2002	18	Bobby Labonte	Virginia 500	Martinsville Speedway
35	May 5, 2002	2002	20	Tony Stewart	Pontiac Excitement 400	Richmond International Raceway
36	August 11, 2002	2002	20	Tony Stewart	Sirius Satellite Radio at the Glen	Watkins Glen International
37	March 9, 2003	2003	18	Bobby Labonte	Bass Pro Shops MBNA 500	Atlanta Motor Speedway
38	June 8, 2003	2003	20	Tony Stewart	Pocono 500	Pocono Raceway
39	October 11, 2003	2003	20	Tony Stewart	UAW-GM Quality 500	Lowe's Motor Speedway
40	November 16, 2003	2003	18	Bobby Labonte	Ford 400	Homestead–Miami Speedway
41	July 11, 2004	2004	20	Tony Stewart	Tropicana 400	Chicagoland Speedway
42	August 15, 2004	2004	20	Tony Stewart	Sirius Satellite Radio at the Glen	Watkins Glen International
43	June 26, 2005	2005	20	Tony Stewart	Dodge/Save Mart 350	Infineon Raceway
44	July 2, 2005	2005	20	Tony Stewart	Pepsi 400	Daytona International Speedway
45	July 17, 2005	2005	20	Tony Stewart	New England 300	New Hampshire International Speedway
46	August 7, 2005	2005	20	Tony Stewart	Allstate 400 at The Brickyard	Indianapolis Motor Speedway
47	August 14, 2005	2005	20	Tony Stewart	Sirius Satellite Radio at the Glen	Watkins Glen International
48	April 2, 2006	2006	20	Tony Stewart	DirecTV 500	Martinsville Speedway
49	June 11, 2006	2006	11	Denny Hamlin	Pocono 500	Pocono Raceway
50	July 1, 2006	2006	20	Tony Stewart	Pepsi 400	Daytona International Speedway
51	July 23, 2006	2006	11	Denny Hamlin	Pennsylvania 500	Pocono Raceway
52	October 1, 2006	2006	20	Tony Stewart	Banquet 400	Kansas Speedway
53	October 29, 2006	2006	20	Tony Stewart	Bass Pro Shops MBNA 500	Atlanta Motor Speedway
54	November 5, 2006	2006	20	Tony Stewart	Dickies 500	Texas Motor Speedway
55	July 1, 2007	2007	11	Denny Hamlin	Lenox Industrial Tools 300	New Hampshire International Speedway
56	July 15, 2007	2007	20	Tony Stewart	USG Sheetrock 400	Chicagoland Speedway
57	July 29, 2007	2007	20	Tony Stewart	Allstate 400 at The Brickyard	Indianapolis Motor Speedway
58	August 12, 2007	2007	20	Tony Stewart	Centurion Boats at the Glen	Watkins Glen International
59	March 9, 2008	2008	18	Kyle Busch	Kobalt Tools 500	Atlanta Motor Speedway
60	March 30, 2008	2008	11	Denny Hamlin	Goody's Cool Orange 500	Martinsville Speedway
61	April 27, 2008	2008	18	Kyle Busch	Aaron's 499	Talladega Superspeedway
62	May 10, 2008	2008	18	Kyle Busch	Dodge Challenger 500	Darlington Raceway
63	June 1, 2008	2008	18	Kyle Busch	Best Buy 400 benefiting Student Clubs for Autism Speaks	Dover International Speedway
64	June 22, 2008	2008	18	Kyle Busch	Toyota/Save Mart 350	Infineon Raceway
65	July 5, 2008	2008	18	Kyle Busch	Coke Zero 400	Daytona International Speedway
66	July 12, 2008	2008	18	Kyle Busch	LifeLock.com 400	Chicagoland Speedway
67	August 10, 2008	2008	18	Kyle Busch	Centurion Boats at the Glen	Watkins Glen International
68	October 5, 2008	2008	20	Tony Stewart	AMP Energy 500	Talladega Superspeedway
69	March 1, 2009	2009	18	Kyle Busch	Shelby 427	Las Vegas Motor Speedway
70	March 22, 2009	2009	18	Kyle Busch	Food City 500	Bristol Motor Speedway
71	May 2, 2009	2009	18	Kyle Busch	Crown Royal Presents the Russ Friedman 400	Richmond International Raceway
72	June 28, 2009	2009	20	Joey Logano	Lenox Industrial Tools 301	New Hampshire Motor Speedway
73	August 3, 2009	2009	11	Denny Hamlin	Sunoco Red Cross Pennsylvania 500	Pocono Raceway
74	August 22, 2009	2009	18	Kyle Busch	Sharpie 500	Bristol Motor Speedway
75	September 12, 2009	2009	11	Denny Hamlin	Chevy Rock & Roll 400	Richmond International Raceway
76	October 25, 2009	2009	11	Denny Hamlin	TUMS Fast Relief 500	Martinsville Speedway
77	November 22, 2009	2009	11	Denny Hamlin	Ford 400	Homestead–Miami Speedway
78	March 29, 2010	2010	11	Denny Hamlin	Goody's Fast Pain Relief 500	Martinsville Speedway
79	April 19, 2010	2010	11	Denny Hamlin	Samsung Mobile 500	Texas Motor Speedway
80	May 1, 2010	2010	18	Kyle Busch	Crown Royal Presents the Heath Calhoun 400	Richmond International Raceway
81	May 8, 2010	2010	11	Denny Hamlin	Showtime Southern 500	Darlington Raceway
82	May 16, 2010	2010	18	Kyle Busch	Autism Speaks 400	Dover International Speedway
83	June 6, 2010	2010	11	Denny Hamlin	Gillette Fusion ProGlide 500	Pocono Raceway
84	June 13, 2010	2010	11	Denny Hamlin	Heluva Good! Sour Cream Dips 400	Michigan International Speedway
85	August 21, 2010	2010	18	Kyle Busch	Irwin Tools Night Race	Bristol Motor Speedway
86	September 11, 2010	2010	11	Denny Hamlin	Air Guard 400	Richmond International Raceway
87	October 24, 2010	2010	11	Denny Hamlin	TUMS Fast Relief 500	Martinsville Speedway
88	November 7, 2010	2010	11	Denny Hamlin	AAA Texas 500	Texas Motor Speedway
89	March 20, 2011	2011	18	Kyle Busch	Jeff Byrd 500 presented by Food City	Bristol Motor Speedway
90	April 30, 2011	2011	18	Kyle Busch	Crown Royal Presents the Matthew and Daniel Hansen 400	Richmond International Raceway
91	June 19, 2011	2011	11	Denny Hamlin	Heluva Good! Sour Cream Dips 400	Michigan International Speedway
92	July 9, 2011	2011	18	Kyle Busch	Quaker State 400	Kentucky Speedway
93	August 21, 2011	2011	18	Kyle Busch	Pure Michigan 400	Michigan International Speedway
94	March 4, 2012	2012	11	Denny Hamlin	Subway Fresh Fit 500	Phoenix International Raceway
95	April 22, 2012	2012	11	Denny Hamlin	STP 400	Kansas Speedway
96	April 28, 2012	2012	18	Kyle Busch	Capital City 400 presented by Virginia Is For Lovers	Richmond International Raceway
97	June 10, 2012	2012	20	Joey Logano	Pocono 400	Pocono Raceway
98	August 25, 2012	2012	11	Denny Hamlin	Irwin Tools Night Race	Bristol Motor Speedway
99	September 2, 2012	2012	11	Denny Hamlin	AdvoCare 500	Atlanta Motor Speedway
100	September 23, 2012	2012	11	Denny Hamlin	Sylvania 300	New Hampshire Motor Speedway
101	March 10, 2013	2013	20	Matt Kenseth	Kobalt Tools 400	Las Vegas Motor Speedway
102	March 24, 2013	2013	18	Kyle Busch	Auto Club 400	Auto Club Speedway
103	April 13, 2013	2013	18	Kyle Busch	NRA 500	Texas Motor Speedway
104	April 21, 2013	2013	20	Matt Kenseth	STP 400	Kansas Speedway
105	May 11, 2013	2013	20	Matt Kenseth	Bojangles' Southern 500	Darlington Raceway
106	June 30, 2013	2013	20	Matt Kenseth	Quaker State 400	Kentucky Speedway
107	August 11, 2013	2013	18	Kyle Busch	Cheez-It 355 at The Glen	Watkins Glen International
108	August 24, 2013	2013	20	Matt Kenseth	Irwin Tools Night Race	Bristol Motor Speedway
109	September 1, 2013	2013	18	Kyle Busch	AdvoCare 500	Atlanta Motor Speedway
110	September 15, 2013	2013	20	Matt Kenseth	GEICO 400	Chicagoland Speedway
111	September 22, 2013	2013	20	Matt Kenseth	Sylvania 300	New Hampshire Motor Speedway
112	November 17, 2013	2013	11	Denny Hamlin	Ford EcoBoost 400	Homestead–Miami Speedway
113	March 23, 2014	2014	18	Kyle Busch	Auto Club 400	Auto Club Speedway
114	May 4, 2014	2014	11	Denny Hamlin	Aaron's 499	Talladega Superspeedway
115	March 29, 2015	2015	11	Denny Hamlin	STP 500	Martinsville Speedway
116	April 19, 2015	2015	20	Matt Kenseth	Food City 500 in Support of Steve Byrnes	Bristol Motor Speedway
117	May 24, 2015	2015	19	Carl Edwards	Coca-Cola 600	Charlotte Motor Speedway
118	June 28, 2015	2015	18	Kyle Busch	Toyota/Save Mart 350	Sonoma Raceway
119	July 11, 2015	2015	18	Kyle Busch	Quaker State 400	Kentucky Speedway
120	July 19, 2015	2015	18	Kyle Busch	5-hour Energy 301	New Hampshire Motor Speedway
121	July 26, 2015	2015	18	Kyle Busch	Crown Royal Presents the Jeff Kyle 400 at The Brickyard	Indianapolis Motor Speedway
122	August 2, 2015	2015	20	Matt Kenseth	Windows 10 400	Pocono Raceway
123	August 16, 2015	2015	20	Matt Kenseth	Pure Michigan 400	Michigan International Speedway
124	September 6, 2015	2015	19	Carl Edwards	Bojangles' Southern 500	Darlington Raceway
125	September 12, 2015	2015	20	Matt Kenseth	Federated Auto Parts 400	Richmond International Raceway
126	September 20, 2015	2015	11	Denny Hamlin	myAFibRisk.com 400	Chicagoland Speedway
127	September 27, 2015	2015	20	Matt Kenseth	Sylvania 300	New Hampshire Motor Speedway
128	November 22, 2015	2015	18	Kyle Busch	Ford EcoBoost 400	Homestead–Miami Speedway
129	February 21, 2016	2016	11	Denny Hamlin	Daytona 500	Daytona International Speedway
130	April 3, 2016	2016	18	Kyle Busch	STP 500	Martinsville Speedway
131	April 9, 2016	2016	18	Kyle Busch	Duck Commander 500	Texas Motor Speedway
132	April 17, 2016	2016	19	Carl Edwards	Food City 500	Bristol Motor Speedway
133	April 24, 2016	2016	19	Carl Edwards	Toyota Owners 400	Richmond International Raceway
134	May 7, 2016	2016	18	Kyle Busch	GoBowling.com 400	Kansas Speedway
135	May 15, 2016	2016	20	Matt Kenseth	AAA 400 Drive for Autism	Dover International Speedway
136	July 17, 2016	2016	20	Matt Kenseth	New Hampshire 301	New Hampshire Motor Speedway
137	July 24, 2016	2016	18	Kyle Busch	Crown Royal Presents the Combat Wounded Coalition 400 at The Brickyard	Indianapolis Motor Speedway
138	August 7, 2016	2016	11	Denny Hamlin	Cheez-It 355 at The Glen	Watkins Glen International
139	September 10, 2016	2016	11	Denny Hamlin	Federated Auto Parts 400	Richmond International Raceway
140	November 6, 2016	2016	19	Carl Edwards	AAA Texas 500	Texas Motor Speedway
141	July 16, 2017	2017	11	Denny Hamlin	Overton's 301	New Hampshire Motor Speedway
142	July 30, 2017	2017	18	Kyle Busch	Overton's 400	Pocono Raceway
143	August 19, 2017	2017	18	Kyle Busch	Bass Pro Shops NRA Night Race	Bristol Motor Speedway
144	September 3, 2017	2017	11	Denny Hamlin	Bojangles' Southern 500	Darlington Raceway
145	September 24, 2017	2017	18	Kyle Busch	ISM Connect 300	New Hampshire Motor Speedway
146	October 1, 2017	2017	18	Kyle Busch	Apache Warrior 400	Dover International Speedway
147	October 29, 2017	2017	18	Kyle Busch	First Data 500	Martinsville Speedway
148	November 12, 2017	2017	20	Matt Kenseth	Can-Am 500	Phoenix International Raceway
149	April 8, 2018	2018	18	Kyle Busch	O'Reilly Auto Parts 500	Texas Motor Speedway
150	April 16, 2018	2018	18	Kyle Busch	Food City 500	Bristol Motor Speedway
151	April 21, 2018	2018	18	Kyle Busch	Toyota Owners 400	Richmond Raceway
152	May 27, 2018	2018	18	Kyle Busch	Coca-Cola 600	Charlotte Motor Speedway
153	July 1, 2018	2018	18	Kyle Busch	Overton's 400	Chicagoland Speedway
154	July 7, 2018	2018	20	Erik Jones	Coke Zero Sugar 400	Daytona International Speedway
155	July 29, 2018	2018	18	Kyle Busch	Gander Outdoors 400	Pocono Raceway
156	September 22, 2018	2018	18	Kyle Busch	Federated Auto Parts 400	Richmond Raceway
157	November 11, 2018	2018	18	Kyle Busch	Can-Am 500	ISM Raceway
158	February 17, 2019	2019	11	Denny Hamlin	Daytona 500	Daytona International Speedway
159	March 10, 2019	2019	18	Kyle Busch	TicketGuardian 500	ISM Raceway
160	March 17, 2019	2019	18	Kyle Busch	Auto Club 400	Auto Club Speedway
161	March 31, 2019	2019	11	Denny Hamlin	O'Reilly Auto Parts 500	Texas Motor Speedway
162	April 7, 2019	2019	18	Kyle Busch	Food City 500	Bristol Motor Speedway
163	April 13, 2019	2019	19	Martin Truex Jr.	Toyota Owners 400	Richmond Raceway
164	May 6, 2019	2019	19	Martin Truex Jr.	Gander RV 400	Dover International Speedway
165	May 26, 2019	2019	19	Martin Truex Jr.	Coca-Cola 600	Charlotte Motor Speedway
166	June 2, 2019	2019	18	Kyle Busch	Pocono 400	Pocono Raceway
167	June 23, 2019	2019	19	Martin Truex Jr.	Toyota/Save Mart 350	Sonoma Raceway
168	July 28, 2019	2019	11	Denny Hamlin	Gander RV 400	Pocono Raceway
169	August 17, 2019	2019	11	Denny Hamlin	Bass Pro Shops NRA Night Race	Bristol Motor Speedway
170	September 1–2, 2019	2019	20	Erik Jones	Bojangles' Southern 500	Darlington Raceway
171	September 15, 2019	2019	19	Martin Truex Jr.	South Point 400	Las Vegas Motor Speedway
172	September 21, 2019	2019	19	Martin Truex Jr.	Federated Auto Parts 400	Richmond Raceway
173	October 20, 2019	2019	11	Denny Hamlin	Hollywood Casino 400	Kansas Speedway
174	October 27, 2019	2019	19	Martin Truex Jr.	First Data 500	Martinsville Speedway
175	November 10, 2019	2019	11	Denny Hamlin	Bluegreen Vacations 500	ISM Raceway
176	November 17, 2019	2019	18	Kyle Busch	Ford EcoBoost 400	Homestead–Miami Speedway
177	February 17, 2020	2020	11	Denny Hamlin	Daytona 500	Daytona International Speedway
178	May 20, 2020	2020	11	Denny Hamlin	Toyota 500	Darlington Raceway
179	June 10, 2020	2020	19	Martin Truex Jr.	Blue-Emu Maximum Pain Relief 500	Martinsville Speedway
180	June 14, 2020	2020	11	Denny Hamlin	Dixie Vodka 400	Homestead–Miami Speedway
181	June 28, 2020	2020	11	Denny Hamlin	Pocono 350	Pocono Raceway
182	July 23, 2020	2020	11	Denny Hamlin	Super Start Batteries 400	Kansas Speedway
183	August 22, 2020	2020	11	Denny Hamlin	Drydene 311 Race 1	Dover International Speedway
184	October 4, 2020	2020	11	Denny Hamlin	YellaWood 500	Talladega Superspeedway
185	October 25–28, 2020	2020	18	Kyle Busch	Autotrader EchoPark Automotive 500	Texas Motor Speedway
186	February 21, 2021	2021	20	Christopher Bell	O'Reilly Auto Parts 253	Daytona Road Course
187	March 14, 2021	2021	19	Martin Truex Jr.	Instacart 500	Phoenix Raceway
188	April 11, 2021	2021	19	Martin Truex Jr.	Blue-Emu Maximum Pain Relief 500	Martinsville Speedway
189	May 2, 2021	2021	18	Kyle Busch	Buschy McBusch Race 400	Kansas Speedway
190	May 9, 2021	2021	19	Martin Truex Jr.	Goodyear 400	Darlington Raceway
191	June 27, 2021	2021	18	Kyle Busch	Explore the Pocono Mountains 350	Pocono Raceway
192	September 5, 2021	2021	11	Denny Hamlin	Cook Out Southern 500	Darlington Raceway
193	September 11, 2021	2021	19	Martin Truex Jr.	Federated Auto Parts 400 Salute to First Responders	Richmond Raceway
194	September 26, 2021	2021	11	Denny Hamlin	South Point 400	Las Vegas Motor Speedway
195	April 3, 2022	2022	11	Denny Hamlin	Toyota Owners 400	Richmond Raceway
196	April 17, 2022	2022	18	Kyle Busch	Food City Dirt Race	Bristol Dirt Track
197	May 29, 2022	2022	11	Denny Hamlin	Coca-Cola 600	Charlotte Motor Speedway
198	July 17, 2022	2022	20	Christopher Bell	Ambetter 301	New Hampshire Motor Speedway
– (Note: Hamlin and second-place finisher Kyle Busch were disqualified after failing post-race inspection. Third-place finisher Chase Elliott was awarded the win.)	July 24, 2022	2022	11	Denny Hamlin	M&M's Fan Appreciation 400	Pocono Raceway
199	October 9, 2022	2022	20	Christopher Bell	Bank of America Roval 400	Charlotte Roval
200	October 30, 2022	2022	20	Christopher Bell	Xfinity 500	Martinsville Speedway
201	April 9, 2023	2023	20	Christopher Bell	Food City Dirt Race	Bristol Dirt Track
202	May 1, 2023	2023	19	Martin Truex Jr.	Würth 400	Dover International Speedway
203	May 7, 2023	2023	11	Denny Hamlin	AdventHealth 400	Kansas Speedway
204	June 11, 2023	2023	19	Martin Truex Jr.	Toyota/Save Mart 350	Sonoma Raceway
205	July 17, 2023	2023	19	Martin Truex Jr.	Crayon 301	New Hampshire Motor Speedway
206	July 23, 2023	2023	11	Denny Hamlin	HighPoint.com 400	Pocono Raceway
207	September 16, 2023	2023	11	Denny Hamlin	Bass Pro Shops Night Race	Bristol Motor Speedway
208	October 22, 2023	2023	20	Christopher Bell	4EVER 400	Homestead–Miami Speedway
209	March 10, 2024	2024	20	Christopher Bell	Shriners Children's 500	Phoenix Raceway
210	March 17, 2024	2024	11	Denny Hamlin	Food City 500	Bristol Motor Speedway
211	March 31, 2024	2024	11	Denny Hamlin	Toyota Owners 400	Richmond Raceway
212	April 28, 2024	2024	11	Denny Hamlin	Würth 400	Dover Motor Speedway
213	May 26, 2024	2024	20	Christopher Bell	Coca-Cola 600	Charlotte Motor Speedway
214	June 23, 2024	2024	20	Christopher Bell	USA Today 301	New Hampshire Motor Speedway
215	February 23, 2025	2025	20	Christopher Bell	Ambetter Health 400	Atlanta Motor Speedway
216	March 2, 2025	2025	20	Christopher Bell	EchoPark Automotive Grand Prix	Circuit of the Americas
217	March 9, 2025	2025	20	Christopher Bell	Shriners Children's 500	Phoenix Raceway
218	March 30, 2025	2025	11	Denny Hamlin	Cook Out 400	Martinsville Speedway
219	April 6, 2025	2025	11	Denny Hamlin	Goodyear 400	Darlington Raceway
220	June 8, 2025	2025	11	Denny Hamlin	FireKeepers Casino 400	Michigan International Speedway
221	June 22, 2025	2025	19	Chase Briscoe	The Great American Getaway 400	Pocono Raceway
222	July 20, 2025	2025	11	Denny Hamlin	Autotrader EchoPark Automotive 400	Dover Motor Speedway
223	August 31, 2025	2025	19	Chase Briscoe	Cook Out Southern 500	Darlington Raceway
224	September 7, 2025	2025	11	Denny Hamlin	Enjoy Illinois 300	World Wide Technology Raceway
225	September 13, 2025	2025	20	Christopher Bell	Bass Pro Shops Night Race	Bristol Motor Speedway
226	October 12, 2025	2025	11	Denny Hamlin	South Point 400	Las Vegas Motor Speedway
227	October 19, 2025	2025	19	Chase Briscoe	YellaWood 500	Talladega Superspeedway
228	March 15, 2026	2026	11	Denny Hamlin	Pennzoil 400	Las Vegas Motor Speedway
229	April 12, 2026	2026	54	Ty Gibbs	Food City 500	Bristol Motor Speedway
230	May 31, 2026	2026	11	Denny Hamlin	Cracker Barrel 400	Nashville Superspeedway
231	June 7, 2026	2026	11	Denny Hamlin	FireKeepers Casino 400	Michigan International Speedway
232	June 14, 2026	2026	11	Denny Hamlin	The Great American Getaway 400	Pocono Raceway
233	July 5, 2026	2026	19	Chase Briscoe	eero 400	Chicagoland Speedway
234	August 9, 2026	2026	54	Ty Gibbs	Iowa Corn 350	Iowa Speedway
235	September 6, 2026	2026	20	Christopher Bell	Cook Out Southern 500	Darlington Raceway
236	October 4, 2026	2026	19	Chase Briscoe	South Point 400	Las Vegas Motor Speedway
237	October 11, 2026	2026	19	Chase Briscoe	Bank of America 400	Charlotte Motor Speedway

=== Non-points exhibition race wins ===
NASCAR Cup Series exhibition race victories
No.	Date	Season	Car #	Driver	Race	Track
1	February 11, 1999	1999	18	Bobby Labonte	Gatorade 125 #1	Daytona International Speedway
2	May 22, 1999	1999	20	Tony Stewart	No Bull 25 Shootout Race #2	Lowe's Motor Speedway
3	May 22, 1999	1999	20	Tony Stewart	Winston Open	Lowe's Motor Speedway
4	February 11, 2001	2001	20	Tony Stewart	Budweiser Shootout	Daytona International Speedway
5	February 10, 2002	2002	20	Tony Stewart	Budweiser Shootout	Daytona International Speedway
6	February 17, 2005	2005	20	Tony Stewart	Gatorade Duel 150 #2	Daytona International Speedway
7	February 12, 2006	2006	11	Denny Hamlin	Budweiser Shootout	Daytona International Speedway
8	February 10, 2007	2007	20	Tony Stewart	Budweiser Shootout	Daytona International Speedway
9	February 15, 2007	2007	20	Tony Stewart	Gatorade Duel 150 #1	Daytona International Speedway
10	February 14, 2008	2008	11	Denny Hamlin	Gatorade Duel 150 #2	Daytona International Speedway
11	February 12, 2009	2009	18	Kyle Busch	Gatorade Duel 150 #2	Daytona International Speedway
12	February 18, 2012	2012	18	Kyle Busch	Budweiser Shootout	Daytona International Speedway
13	February 21, 2013	2013	18	Kyle Busch	Budweiser Duel #2	Daytona International Speedway
14	February 15, 2014	2014	11	Denny Hamlin	Sprint Unlimited	Daytona International Speedway
15	February 20, 2014	2014	20	Matt Kenseth	Budweiser Duel #1	Daytona International Speedway
16	February 20, 2014	2014	11	Denny Hamlin	Budweiser Duel #2	Daytona International Speedway
17	February 14, 2015	2015	20	Matt Kenseth	Sprint Unlimited	Daytona International Speedway
18	May 16, 2015	2015	11	Denny Hamlin	Sprint All-Star Race	Charlotte Motor Speedway
19	February 13, 2016	2016	11	Denny Hamlin	Sprint Unlimited	Daytona International Speedway
20	February 18, 2016	2016	18	Kyle Busch	Can-Am Duel 150 #2	Daytona International Speedway
21	February 23, 2017	2017	11	Denny Hamlin	Can-Am Duel 150 #2	Daytona International Speedway
22	May 20, 2017	2017	19	Daniel Suárez	Monster Energy Open	Charlotte Motor Speedway
23	May 20, 2017	2017	18	Kyle Busch	Monster Energy All-Star Race	Charlotte Motor Speedway
24	February 9, 2020	2020	20	Erik Jones	Busch Clash	Daytona International Speedway
25	February 9, 2021	2021	18	Kyle Busch	Busch Clash	Daytona Road Course
26	February 5, 2023	2023	19	Martin Truex Jr.	Busch Light Clash at The Coliseum	Los Angeles Memorial Coliseum
27	February 3, 2024	2024	11	Denny Hamlin	Busch Light Clash at The Coliseum	Los Angeles Memorial Coliseum
28	February 15	2024	20	Christopher Bell	Bluegreen Vacations Duel 2	Daytona International Speedway
29	May 19, 2024	2024	54	Ty Gibbs	NASCAR All-Star Open	North Wilkesboro Speedway
30	May 18, 2025	2025	20	Christopher Bell	NASCAR All-Star Race	North Wilkesboro Speedway
31	May 17, 2026	2026	11	Denny Hamlin	NASCAR All-Star Race	Dover Motor Speedway

=== Wins by driver ===
Thirteen drivers have won at least one points race for Joe Gibbs Racing in the Cup Series. Denny Hamlin accounts for the majority of race wins, having won 64 races, respectively. Daniel Suárez won an exhibition race while driving for Gibbs but never won a points race.

NASCAR Cup Series victories by driver
Driver	Wins (Points)	Wins (Exhibition)	First Win (Points)	Last Win (Points)
Denny Hamlin	64	9	2006	2026
Kyle Busch	56	6	2008	2022
Tony Stewart	33	7	1999	2008
Bobby Labonte	21	1	1995	2003
Matt Kenseth	15	2	2013	2017
Martin Truex Jr.	15	1	2019	2023
Christopher Bell	14	2	2021	2026
Chase Briscoe	6	0	2025	2026
Carl Edwards	5	0	2015	2016
Dale Jarrett	2	0	1993	1994
Joey Logano	2	0	2009	2012
Erik Jones	2	1	2018	2019
Ty Gibbs	2	1	2026	N/A
Daniel Suárez	0	1	N/A	N/A

=== Wins by track ===
Gibbs has won on 30 of the 35 tracks on which it has competed in the Cup Series, the exceptions being North Wilkesboro Speedway, Indianapolis Road Course, Road America, the Chicago Street Course, and the Autódromo Hermanos Rodríguez.

NASCAR Cup Series victories by racetrack
Order	Track	Wins	First Win	Last Win
1	Richmond Raceway	19	1999	2024
1	Pocono Raceway	19	1999	2026
3	Bristol Motor Speedway	17	2001	2026
4	Martinsville Speedway	15	2000	2025
5	New Hampshire Motor Speedway	14	2000	2024
6	Atlanta Motor Speedway	12	1996	2025
6	Dover Motor Speedway	12	1999	2025
6	Darlington Raceway	12	2000	2026
9	Charlotte Motor Speedway	10	1994	2026
9	Michigan International Speedway	10	1995	2026
10	Texas Motor Speedway	9	2006	2020
10	Homestead–Miami Speedway	9	1999	2023
10	Phoenix Raceway	9	1999	2025
14	Daytona International Speedway	8	1993	2020
14	Kansas Speedway	8	2006	2023
16	Watkins Glen International	7	2002	2016
16	Chicagoland Speedway	7	2004	2026
16	Las Vegas Motor Speedway	7	2009	2026
18	Sonoma Raceway	6	2001	2023
18	Talladega Superspeedway	6	1998	2025
21	Indianapolis Motor Speedway	5	2000	2016
22	Kentucky Speedway	3	2011	2015
22	Auto Club Speedway	3	2013	2019
24	Bristol Dirt Track	2	2022	2023
25	North Carolina Speedway	1	2000	2000
25	Daytona Road Course	1	2021	2021
25	Charlotte Roval	1	2022	2022
25	Circuit of the Americas	1	2025	2025
25	World Wide Technology Raceway	1	2025	2025
25	Nashville Superspeedway	1	2026	2026
25	Iowa Speedway	1	2026	2026

=== Wins by season ===
Joe Gibbs Racing has won at least one race each year except its inaugural season in 1992. In 2019, Gibbs accounted for 19 wins, over half of the total number of points races (36).

. – Gibbs won driver's championship

Wins by Season
Year	Wins	Drivers	Tracks
1993	1	Dale Jarrett (1)	Daytona International Speedway
1994	1	Dale Jarrett (1)	Charlotte Motor Speedway
1995	3	Bobby Labonte (3)	Charlotte Motor Speedway, Michigan International Speedway (1 & 2)
1996	1	Bobby Labonte (1)	Atlanta Motor Speedway
1997	1	Bobby Labonte (1)	Atlanta Motor Speedway
1998	2	Bobby Labonte (2)	Atlanta Motor Speedway, Talladega Superspeedway
1999	8	Bobby Labonte (5), Tony Stewart (3)	Dover Downs International Speedway, Pocono Raceway (1 & 2), Michigan Speedway, Richmond International Raceway, Phoenix International Raceway, Homestead–Miami Speedway, Atlanta Motor Speedway
2000	10	Tony Stewart (6), Bobby Labonte (4)	North Carolina Speedway, Dover Downs International Speedway (1 & 2), Michigan Speedway, New Hampshire International Speedway, Indianapolis Motor Speedway, Darlington Raceway, Martinsville Speedway, Lowe's Motor Speedway, Homestead–Miami Speedway
2001	5	Tony Stewart (3), Bobby Labonte (2)	Richmond International Raceway, Sears Point Raceway, Pocono Raceway, Bristol Motor Speedway, Atlanta Motor Speedway
2002	4	Tony Stewart (3), Bobby Labonte (1)	Atlanta Motor Speedway, Martinsville Speedway, Richmond International Raceway, Watkins Glen International
2003	4	Bobby Labonte (2), Tony Stewart (2)	Atlanta Motor Speedway, Pocono Raceway, Lowe's Motor Speedway, Homestead–Miami Speedway
2004	2	Tony Stewart (2)	Chicagoland Speedway, Watkins Glen International
2005	5	Tony Stewart (5)	Infineon Raceway, Daytona International Speedway, New Hampshire International Speedway, Indianapolis Motor Speedway, Watkins Glen International
2006	7	Tony Stewart (5), Denny Hamlin (2)	Martinsville Speedway, Pocono Raceway (1 & 2), Daytona International Speedway, Kansas Speedway, Atlanta Motor Speedway, Texas Motor Speedway
2007	4	Tony Stewart (3), Denny Hamlin (1)	New Hampshire International Speedway, Chicagoland Speedway, Indianapolis Motor Speedway, Watkins Glen International
2008	10	Kyle Busch (8), Tony Stewart (1), Denny Hamlin (1)	Atlanta Motor Speedway, Martinsville Speedway, Talladega Superspeedway, Darlington Raceway, Dover International Speedway, Infineon Raceway, Daytona International Speedway, Chicagoland Speedway, Watkins Glen International, Talladega Superspeedway
2009	9	Denny Hamlin (4), Kyle Busch (4), Joey Logano (1)	Las Vegas Motor Speedway, Bristol Motor Speedway (1 & 2), Richmond International Raceway (1 & 2), New Hampshire Motor Speedway, Pocono Raceway, Martinsville Speedway, Homestead–Miami Speedway
2010	11	Denny Hamlin (8), Kyle Busch (3)	Martinsville Speedway (1 & 2), Texas Motor Speedway (1 & 2), Richmond International Raceway (1 & 2), Darlington Raceway, Dover International Speedway, Pocono Raceway, Michigan International Speedway, Bristol Motor Speedway
2011	5	Kyle Busch (4), Denny Hamlin (1)	Bristol Motor Speedway, Richmond International Raceway, Michigan International Speedway (1 & 2), Kentucky Speedway
2012	7	Denny Hamlin (5), Kyle Busch (1), Joey Logano (1)	Phoenix International Raceway, Kansas Speedway, Richmond International Raceway, Pocono Raceway, Bristol Motor Speedway, Atlanta Motor Speedway, New Hampshire Motor Speedway
2013	12	Matt Kenseth (7), Kyle Busch (4), Denny Hamlin (1)	Las Vegas Motor Speedway, Auto Club Speedway, Texas Motor Speedway, Kansas Speedway, Darlington Raceway, Kentucky Speedway, Watkins Glen International, Bristol Motor Speedway, Atlanta Motor Speedway, Chicagoland Speedway, New Hampshire Motor Speedway, Homestead–Miami Speedway
2014	2	Denny Hamlin (1), Kyle Busch (1)	Auto Club Speedway, Talladega Superspeedway
2015	14	Kyle Busch (5), Matt Kenseth (5), Denny Hamlin (2), Carl Edwards (2)	Martinsville Speedway, Bristol Motor Speedway, Charlotte Motor Speedway, Sonoma Raceway, Kentucky Speedway, New Hampshire Motor Speedway (1 & 2), Indianapolis Motor Speedway, Pocono Raceway, Michigan International Speedway, Darlington Raceway, Richmond International Raceway, Chicagoland Speedway, Homestead–Miami Speedway
2016	12	Kyle Busch (4), Denny Hamlin (3), Carl Edwards (3), Matt Kenseth (2)	Daytona International Speedway, Martinsville Speedway, Texas Motor Speedway (1 & 2), Bristol Motor Speedway, Richmond International Raceway (1 & 2), Kansas Speedway, Dover International Speedway, New Hampshire Motor Speedway, Indianapolis Motor Speedway, Watkins Glen International
2017	8	Kyle Busch (5), Denny Hamlin (2), Matt Kenseth (1)	New Hampshire Motor Speedway (1 & 2), Pocono Raceway, Bristol Motor Speedway, Darlington Raceway, Dover International Speedway, Martinsville Speedway, Phoenix International Raceway
2018	9	Kyle Busch (8), Erik Jones (1)	Texas Motor Speedway, Bristol Motor Speedway, Richmond Raceway (1 & 2), Charlotte Motor Speedway, Chicagoland Speedway, Daytona International Speedway, Pocono Raceway, ISM Raceway
2019	19	Martin Truex Jr. (7), Denny Hamlin (6), Kyle Busch (5), Erik Jones (1)	Daytona International Speedway, ISM Raceway (1 & 2), Auto Club Speedway, Texas Motor Speedway, Bristol Motor Speedway (1 & 2), Richmond Raceway (1 & 2), Dover International Speedway, Charlotte Motor Speedway, Pocono Raceway (1 & 2), Sonoma Raceway, Darlington Raceway, Las Vegas Motor Speedway, Kansas Speedway, Martinsville Speedway, Homestead–Miami Speedway
2020	9	Denny Hamlin (7), Kyle Busch (1), Martin Truex Jr. (1)	Daytona International Speedway, Darlington Raceway, Martinsville Speedway, Homestead–Miami Speedway, Pocono Raceway, Kansas Speedway, Dover International Speedway, Talladega Superspeedway, Texas Motor Speedway
2021	9	Martin Truex Jr. (4), Denny Hamlin (2), Kyle Busch (2), Christopher Bell (1)	Daytona Road Course, Phoenix Raceway, Martinsville Speedway, Kansas Speedway, Darlington Raceway (1 & 2), Pocono Raceway, Richmond Raceway, Las Vegas Motor Speedway
2022	6	Christopher Bell (3), Denny Hamlin (2), Kyle Busch (1)	Richmond Raceway, Bristol Dirt Track, Charlotte Motor Speedway, New Hampshire Motor Speedway, Charlotte Roval, Martinsville Speedway
2023	8	Martin Truex Jr. (3), Denny Hamlin (3), Christopher Bell (2)	Bristol Dirt Track, Dover International Speedway, Kansas Speedway, Sonoma Raceway, New Hampshire Motor Speedway, Pocono Raceway, Bristol Motor Speedway, Homestead–Miami Speedway
2024	6	Denny Hamlin (3), Christopher Bell (3)	Phoenix Raceway, Bristol Motor Speedway, Richmond Raceway, Dover Motor Speedway, Charlotte Motor Speedway, New Hampshire Motor Speedway
2025	13	Denny Hamlin (6), Christopher Bell (4), Chase Briscoe (3)	Atlanta Motor Speedway, Circuit of the Americas, Phoenix Raceway, Martinsville Speedway, Darlington Raceway, Michigan International Speedway, Pocono Raceway, Dover Motor Speedway, Darlington Raceway, World Wide Technology Raceway, Bristol Motor Speedway, Las Vegas Motor Speedway, Talladega Superspeedway
2026	10	Denny Hamlin (4), Chase Briscoe (3), Ty Gibbs (2), Christopher Bell (1)	Las Vegas Motor Speedway (1 & 2), Bristol Motor Speedway, Nashville Superspeedway, Michigan International Speedway, Pocono Raceway, Chicagoland Speedway, Iowa Speedway, Darlington Raceway, Charlotte Motor Speedway

== O'Reilly Auto Parts Series ==
Joe Gibbs first fielded entries in the then-Busch Series in the late 1990s, making one start in 1997 with Bobby Labonte in the No. 18 at Charlotte. He bought the No. 44 team from Labonte and ran the car full-time in 1998, predominantly with Labonte and Tony Stewart driving. Labonte scored the team's only win at Darlington in his first start in the car. The team ran part-time for 1999, before returning with two full-time teams beginning in 2000. In 2001, Mike McLaughlin earned the team's second win at Talladega in the No. 20. Three years later, Mike Bliss scored the team's third win at Charlotte. With the addition of Denny Hamlin in 2006 and Joey Logano and Kyle Busch in 2008, the organization began winning multiple races per year, scoring at least nine victories every season through 2021 and winning the drivers' championship in 2009 (Busch), 2016 (Daniel Suárez), and 2021 (Daniel Hemric). Ty Gibbs won the championship in 2022, with the organization winning eight races.

Busch won 90 races for the team from 2008 to 2021, finishing his career in the series with 102 total race wins. Additionally, Logano, Hamlin, Christopher Bell, Erik Jones, Ty Gibbs, Tony Stewart, Brandon Jones, Harrison Burton, Matt Kenseth, Daniel Suárez, Sam Hornish Jr., and Ryan Preece all won multiple races for Gibbs during this period. John Hunter Nemechek joined the team full-time in the No. 20 in 2023, winning multiple races, and Sammy Smith and Ryan Truex picked up their first career wins in the Nos. 18 and 19, respectively.

=== O'Reilly Auto Parts Series wins ===
. – Gibbs won driver's championship

NASCAR O'Reilly Auto Parts Series victories
No.	Date	Season	Car #	Driver	Race	Track
1	March 21, 1998	1998	44	Bobby Labonte	Diamond Hill Plywood 200	Darlington Raceway
2	April 21, 2001	2001	20	Mike McLaughlin	Subway 300	Talladega Superspeedway
3	October 15, 2004	2004	20	Mike Bliss	Lowe's Presents the SpongeBob SquarePants Movie 300	Lowe's Motor Speedway
4	March 5, 2006	2006	20	Denny Hamlin	Telcel Motorola 200 presented by Banamex	Autódromo Hermanos Rodríguez
5	May 12, 2006	2006	20	Denny Hamlin	Diamond Hill Plywood 200	Darlington Raceway
6	May 11, 2007	2007	20	Denny Hamlin	Diamond Hill Plywood 200	Darlington Raceway
7	June 23, 2007	2007	20	Aric Almirola (Note: Almirola began the race substituting for Denny Hamlin, who was delayed in arriving to the track. Almirola led 43 laps before being replaced by Hamlin on lap 59. Hamlin went on to win the race; however, Almirola was credited with the win.)	AT&T 250	Milwaukee Mile
8	August 18, 2007	2007	20	Denny Hamlin	Carfax 250	Michigan International Speedway
9	September 22, 2007	2007	20	Denny Hamlin	RoadLoans.com 200	Dover International Speedway
10	February 16, 2008	2008	20	Tony Stewart	Camping World 300	Daytona International Speedway
11	February 25, 2008	2008	20	Tony Stewart	Stater Brothers 300	Auto Club Speedway
12	April 5, 2008	2008	18	Kyle Busch	O'Reilly 300	Texas Motor Speedway
13	April 11, 2008	2008	18	Kyle Busch	Bashas' Supermarkets 200	Phoenix International Raceway
14	April 20, 2008	2008	20	Kyle Busch	Corona México 200	Autódromo Hermanos Rodríguez
15	April 26, 2008	2008	20	Tony Stewart	Aaron's 312	Talladega Superspeedway
16	May 2, 2008	2008	20	Denny Hamlin	Lipton Tea 250	Richmond International Raceway
17	May 9, 2008	2008	20	Tony Stewart	Diamond Hill Plywood 200	Darlington Raceway
18	May 31, 2008	2008	18	Denny Hamlin	Heluva Good! 200	Dover International Speedway
19	June 14, 2008	2008	20	Joey Logano	Meijer 300	Kentucky Speedway
20	June 28, 2008	2008	20	Tony Stewart	Camping World RV Sales 200	New Hampshire Motor Speedway
21	July 4, 2008	2008	20	Denny Hamlin	Winn-Dixie 250	Daytona International Speedway
22	July 11, 2008	2008	18	Kyle Busch	Dollar General 300	Chicagoland Speedway
23	July 26, 2008	2008	18	Kyle Busch	Kroger 200	O'Reilly Raceway Park
24	August 30, 2008	2008	18	Kyle Busch	Camping World RV Service 300	Auto Club Speedway
25	September 20, 2008	2008	18	Kyle Busch	Camping World RV Sales 200	Dover International Speedway
26	September 27, 2008	2008	18	Denny Hamlin	Kansas Lottery 300	Kansas Speedway
27	October 10, 2008	2008	18	Kyle Busch	Dollar General 300	Lowe's Motor Speedway
28	November 1, 2008	2008	18	Kyle Busch	O'Reilly Challenge	Texas Motor Speedway
29	February 21, 2009	2009	18	Kyle Busch	Stater Brothers 300	Auto Club Speedway
30	April 4, 2009	2009	18	Kyle Busch	O'Reilly 300	Texas Motor Speedway
31	April 11, 2009	2009	20	Joey Logano	Nashville 300	Nashville Superspeedway
32	May 1, 2009	2009	18	Kyle Busch	Lipton Tea 250	Richmond International Raceway
33	June 6, 2009	2009	18	Kyle Busch	Federated Auto Parts 300	Nashville Superspeedway
34	June 13, 2009	2009	20	Joey Logano	Meijer 300	Kentucky Speedway
35	June 27, 2009	2009	18	Kyle Busch	Camping World RV Sales 200	New Hampshire Motor Speedway
36	July 10, 2009	2009	20	Joey Logano	Dollar General 300	Chicagoland Speedway
37	July 18, 2009	2009	18	Kyle Busch	Missouri-Illinois Dodge Dealers 250	Gateway International Raceway
38	October 3, 2009	2009	20	Joey Logano	Kansas Lottery 300	Kansas Speedway
39	October 10, 2009	2009	20	Joey Logano	Copart 300	Auto Club Speedway
40	October 16, 2009	2009	18	Kyle Busch	Dollar General 300	Lowe's Motor Speedway
41	November 7, 2009	2009	18	Kyle Busch	O'Reilly Challenge	Texas Motor Speedway
42	November 21, 2009	2009	18	Kyle Busch	Ford 300	Homestead–Miami Speedway
43	February 20, 2010	2010	18	Kyle Busch	Stater Brothers 300	Auto Club Speedway
44	April 9, 2010	2010	18	Kyle Busch	Bashas' Supermarkets 200	Phoenix International Raceway
45	April 19, 2010	2010	18	Kyle Busch	O'Reilly Auto Parts 300	Texas Motor Speedway
46	May 7, 2010	2010	20	Denny Hamlin	Royal Purple 200	Darlington Raceway
47	May 15, 2010	2010	18	Kyle Busch	Heluva Good! 200	Dover International Speedway
48	May 29, 2010	2010	18	Kyle Busch	Tech-Net Auto Service 300	Charlotte Motor Speedway
49	June 12, 2010	2010	20	Joey Logano	Meijer 300	Kentucky Speedway
50	June 26, 2010	2010	18	Kyle Busch	New England 200	New Hampshire Motor Speedway
51	July 9, 2010	2010	18	Kyle Busch	Dollar General 300	Chicagoland Speedway
52	July 24, 2010	2010	18	Kyle Busch	Kroger 200	O'Reilly Raceway Park
53	July 31, 2010	2010	18	Kyle Busch	U.S. Cellular 250	Iowa Speedway
54	August 20, 2010	2010	18	Kyle Busch	Food City 250	Bristol Motor Speedway
55	September 25, 2010	2010	18	Kyle Busch	Dover 200	Dover International Speedway
56	October 2, 2010	2010	20	Joey Logano	Kansas Lottery 300	Kansas Speedway
57	October 9, 2010	2010	18	Kyle Busch	CampingWorld.com 300	Auto Club Speedway
58	November 20, 2010	2010	18	Kyle Busch	Ford 300	Homestead–Miami Speedway
59	February 26, 2011	2011	18	Kyle Busch	Bashas' Supermarkets 200	Phoenix International Raceway
60	March 19, 2011	2011	18	Kyle Busch	Scotts EZ Seed 300	Bristol Motor Speedway
61	March 26, 2011	2011	18	Kyle Busch	Royal Purple 300	Auto Club Speedway
62	April 16, 2011	2011	18	Kyle Busch	Aaron's 312	Talladega Superspeedway
63	April 29, 2011	2011	20	Denny Hamlin	Bubba Burger 250	Richmond International Raceway
64	May 6, 2011	2011	18	Kyle Busch	Royal Purple 200	Darlington Raceway
65	July 1, 2011	2011	20	Joey Logano	Subway Jalapeño 250	Daytona International Speedway
66	July 16, 2011	2011	18	Kyle Busch	New England 200	New Hampshire Motor Speedway
67	August 26, 2011	2011	18	Kyle Busch	Food City 250	Bristol Motor Speedway
68	September 9, 2011	2011	18	Kyle Busch	Virginia 529 College Savings 250	Richmond International Raceway
69	March 24, 2012	2012	18	Joey Logano	Royal Purple 300	Auto Club Speedway
70	May 5, 2012	2012	18	Joey Logano	Aaron's 312	Talladega Superspeedway
71	May 11, 2012	2012	20	Joey Logano	VFW Sport Clips Help a Hero 200	Darlington Raceway
72	June 2, 2012	2012	18	Joey Logano	5-hour Energy 200	Dover International Speedway
73	June 16, 2012	2012	18	Joey Logano	Alliance Truck Parts 250	Michigan International Speedway
74	August 24, 2012	2012	18	Joey Logano	Food City 250	Bristol Motor Speedway
75	September 29, 2012	2012	18	Joey Logano	OneMain Financial 200	Dover International Speedway
76	October 12, 2012	2012	20	Joey Logano	Dollar General 300	Charlotte Motor Speedway
77	November 10, 2012	2012	18	Joey Logano	Great Clips 200	Phoenix International Raceway
78	March 2, 2013	2013	54	Kyle Busch	Dollar General 200	Phoenix International Raceway
79	March 16, 2013	2013	54	Kyle Busch	Jeff Foxworthy's Grit Chips 300	Bristol Motor Speedway
80	March 23, 2013	2013	54	Kyle Busch	Royal Purple 300	Auto Club Speedway
81	April 12, 2013	2013	54	Kyle Busch	O'Reilly Auto Parts 300	Texas Motor Speedway
82	May 10, 2013	2013	54	Kyle Busch	VFW Sport Clips Help a Hero 200	Darlington Raceway
83	May 25, 2013	2013	54	Kyle Busch	History 300	Charlotte Motor Speedway
84	July 5, 2013	2013	18	Matt Kenseth	Subway Firecracker 250	Daytona International Speedway
85	July 13, 2013	2013	54	Kyle Busch	CNBC Prime's "The Profit" 200	New Hampshire Motor Speedway
86	July 27, 2013	2013	54	Kyle Busch	Indiana 250	Indianapolis Motor Speedway
87	August 23, 2013	2013	54	Kyle Busch	Food City 250	Bristol Motor Speedway
88	September 14, 2013	2013	54	Kyle Busch	Dollar General 300	Chicagoland Speedway
89	October 5, 2013	2013	18	Matt Kenseth	Kansas Lottery 300	Kansas Speedway
90	October 11, 2013	2013	54	Kyle Busch	Dollar General 300	Charlotte Motor Speedway
91	November 9, 2013	2013	54	Kyle Busch	ServiceMaster 200	Phoenix International Raceway
92	March 1, 2014	2014	54	Kyle Busch	Blue Jeans Go Green 200	Phoenix International Raceway
93	March 15, 2014	2014	54	Kyle Busch	Drive to Stop Diabetes 300	Bristol Motor Speedway
94	May 3, 2014	2014	11	Elliott Sadler	Aaron's 312	Talladega Superspeedway
95	May 18, 2014	2014	54	Sam Hornish Jr.	Get To Know Newton 250	Iowa Speedway
96	May 31, 2014	2014	54	Kyle Busch	Buckle Up 200	Dover International Speedway
97	September 5, 2014	2014	54	Kyle Busch	Virginia 529 College Savings 250	Richmond International Raceway
98	September 27, 2014	2014	54	Kyle Busch	Dover 200	Dover International Speedway
99	October 4, 2014	2014	54	Kyle Busch	Kansas Lottery 300	Kansas Speedway
100	November 1, 2014	2014	54	Kyle Busch	O'Reilly Auto Parts Challenge	Texas Motor Speedway
101	November 15, 2014	2014	20	Matt Kenseth	Ford EcoBoost 300	Homestead–Miami Speedway
102	April 10, 2015	2015	20	Erik Jones	O'Reilly Auto Parts 300	Texas Motor Speedway
103	April 24, 2015	2015	20	Denny Hamlin	ToyotaCare 250	Richmond International Raceway
104	June 13, 2015	2015	54	Kyle Busch	Great Clips 250	Michigan International Speedway
105	June 21, 2015	2015	54	Erik Jones	Owens Corning AttiCat 300	Chicagoland Speedway
106	July 18, 2015	2015	20	Denny Hamlin	Lakes Region 200	New Hampshire Motor Speedway
107	July 25, 2015	2015	54	Kyle Busch	Lilly Diabetes 250	Indianapolis Motor Speedway
108	August 21, 2015	2015	54	Kyle Busch	Food City 300	Bristol Motor Speedway
109	September 5, 2015	2015	20	Denny Hamlin	VFW Sport Clips Help a Hero 200	Darlington Raceway
110	September 19, 2015	2015	54	Kyle Busch	Furious 7 300	Chicagoland Speedway
111	October 17, 2015	2015	54	Kyle Busch	Kansas Lottery 300	Kansas Speedway
112	November 14, 2015	2015	54	Kyle Busch	DAV 200	Phoenix International Raceway
113	February 27, 2016	2016	18	Kyle Busch	Heads Up Georgia 250	Atlanta Motor Speedway
114	March 5, 2016	2016	18	Kyle Busch	Boyd Gaming 300	Las Vegas Motor Speedway
115	March 12, 2016	2016	18	Kyle Busch	Axalta Faster. Tougher. Brighter. 200	Phoenix International Raceway
116	April 8, 2016	2016	18	Kyle Busch	O'Reilly Auto Parts 300	Texas Motor Speedway
117	April 16, 2016	2016	20	Erik Jones	Fitzgerald Glider Kits 300	Bristol Motor Speedway
118	May 14, 2016	2016	20	Erik Jones	Ollie's Bargain Outlet 200	Dover International Speedway
119	May 28, 2016	2016	18	Denny Hamlin	Hisense 4K TV 300	Charlotte Motor Speedway
120	June 11, 2016	2016	19	Daniel Suárez	Menards 250	Michigan International Speedway
121	June 19, 2016	2016	18	Sam Hornish Jr.	American Ethanol E15 250	Iowa Speedway
122	July 8, 2016	2016	18	Kyle Busch	Alsco 300	Kentucky Speedway
123	July 16, 2016	2016	18	Kyle Busch	AutoLotto 200	New Hampshire Motor Speedway
124	July 23, 2016	2016	18	Kyle Busch	Lilly Diabetes 250	Indianapolis Motor Speedway
125	July 30, 2016	2016	20	Erik Jones	U.S. Cellular 250	Iowa Speedway
126	September 9, 2016	2016	18	Kyle Busch	Virginia 529 College Savings 250	Richmond International Raceway
127	September 17, 2016	2016	20	Erik Jones	Drive for Safety 300	Chicagoland Speedway
128	October 2, 2016	2016	19	Daniel Suárez	Drive Sober 200	Dover International Speedway
129	October 15, 2016	2016	18	Kyle Busch	Kansas Lottery 300	Kansas Speedway
130	November 12, 2016	2016	18	Kyle Busch	Ticket Galaxy 200	Phoenix International Raceway
131	November 19, 2016	2016	19	Daniel Suárez	Ford EcoBoost 300	Homestead–Miami Speedway
132	March 4, 2017	2017	18	Kyle Busch	Rinnai 250	Atlanta Motor Speedway
133	April 8, 2017	2017	20	Erik Jones	My Bariatric Solutions 300	Texas Motor Speedway
134	April 22, 2017	2017	20	Erik Jones	Fitzgerald Glider Kits 300	Bristol Motor Speedway
135	June 17, 2017	2017	20	Denny Hamlin	Irish Hills 250	Michigan International Speedway
136	July 8, 2017	2017	18	Kyle Busch	Alsco 300	Kentucky Speedway
137	July 15, 2017	2017	18	Kyle Busch	Overton's 200	New Hampshire Motor Speedway
138	July 29, 2017	2017	20	Ryan Preece	U.S. Cellular 250	Iowa Speedway
139	August 5, 2017	2017	18	Kyle Busch	Zippo 200 at The Glen	Watkins Glen International
140	August 18, 2017	2017	18	Kyle Busch	Food City 300	Bristol Motor Speedway
141	September 2, 2017	2017	18	Denny Hamlin	Sport Clips Haircuts VFW 200	Darlington Raceway
142	October 21, 2017	2017	18	Christopher Bell	Kansas Lottery 300	Kansas Speedway
143	November 4, 2017	2017	20	Erik Jones	O'Reilly Auto Parts 300	Texas Motor Speedway
144	April 14, 2018	2018	18	Ryan Preece	Fitzgerald Glider Kits 300	Bristol Motor Speedway
145	April 20, 2018	2018	20	Christopher Bell	ToyotaCare 250	Richmond Raceway
146	June 2, 2018	2018	18	Kyle Busch	Pocono Green 250	Pocono Raceway
147	July 13, 2018	2018	20	Christopher Bell	Alsco 300	Kentucky Speedway
148	July 21, 2018	2018	20	Christopher Bell	Lakes Region 200	New Hampshire Motor Speedway
149	July 28, 2018	2018	20	Christopher Bell	U.S. Cellular 250	Iowa Speedway
150	September 21, 2018	2018	20	Christopher Bell	Go Bowling 250	Richmond Raceway
151	October 6, 2018	2018	20	Christopher Bell	Bar Harbor 200	Dover International Speedway
152	November 10, 2018	2018	20	Christopher Bell	Whelen Trusted to Perform 200	ISM Raceway
153	February 23, 2019	2019	20	Christopher Bell	Rinnai 250	Atlanta Motor Speedway
154	March 2, 2019	2019	18	Kyle Busch	Boyd Gaming 300	Las Vegas Motor Speedway
155	March 9, 2019	2019	18	Kyle Busch	iK9 Service Dog 200	ISM Raceway
156	March 30, 2019	2019	18	Kyle Busch	My Bariatric Solutions 300	Texas Motor Speedway
157	April 6, 2019	2019	20	Christopher Bell	Alsco 300	Bristol Motor Speedway
158	May 4, 2019	2019	20	Christopher Bell	Use Your Melon Drive Sober 200	Dover International Speedway
159	June 16, 2019	2019	20	Christopher Bell	CircuitCity.com 250	Iowa Speedway
160	July 20, 2019	2019	20	Christopher Bell	ROXOR 200	New Hampshire Motor Speedway
161	August 24, 2019	2019	20	Christopher Bell	CTECH Manufacturing 180	Road America
– (Note: Hamlin was disqualified after failing post-race inspection. Second-place finisher Cole Custer was awarded the win.)	August 31, 2019	2019	18	Denny Hamlin	Sport Clips Haircuts VFW 200	Darlington Raceway
162	September 5, 2019	2019	18	Kyle Busch	Indiana 250	Indianapolis Motor Speedway
163	September 20, 2019	2019	20	Christopher Bell	Go Bowling 250	Richmond Raceway
164	October 19, 2019	2019	19	Brandon Jones	Kansas Lottery 300	Kansas Speedway
165	November 2, 2019	2019	20	Christopher Bell	O'Reilly Auto Parts 300	Texas Motor Speedway
166	February 29, 2020	2020	20	Harrison Burton	Production Alliance Group 300	Auto Club Speedway
167	March 7, 2020	2020	19	Brandon Jones	LS Tractor 200	Phoenix Raceway
168	May 25, 2020	2020	54	Kyle Busch	Alsco 300	Charlotte Motor Speedway
169	June 13, 2020	2020	19	Harrison Burton	Hooters 250	Homestead–Miami Speedway
– (Note: Busch was disqualified after failing post-race inspection. Second-place finisher Austin Cindric was awarded the win.)	July 18, 2020	2020	54	Kyle Busch	My Bariatric Solutions 300	Texas Motor Speedway
170	July 25, 2020	2020	19	Brandon Jones	Kansas Lottery 250	Kansas Speedway
171	September 5, 2020	2020	19	Brandon Jones	Sport Clips Haircuts VFW 200	Darlington Raceway
172	October 24, 2020	2020	19	Harrison Burton	O'Reilly Auto Parts 300	Texas Motor Speedway
173	October 31, 2020	2020	19	Harrison Burton	Draft Top 250	Martinsville Speedway
174	February 20, 2021	2021	54	Ty Gibbs	Super Start Batteries 188	Daytona Road Course
175	May 22, 2021	2021	54	Kyle Busch	Pit Boss 250	Circuit of the Americas
176	May 29, 2021	2021	54	Ty Gibbs	Alsco Uniforms 300	Charlotte Motor Speedway
177	June 12, 2021	2021	54	Kyle Busch	Alsco Uniforms 250	Texas Motor Speedway
178	June 19, 2021	2021	54	Kyle Busch	Tennessee Lottery 250	Nashville Superspeedway
179	July 3, 2021	2021	54	Kyle Busch	Henry 180	Road America
180	July 10, 2021	2021	54	Kyle Busch	Credit Karma Money 250	Atlanta Motor Speedway
181	July 17, 2021	2021	54	Christopher Bell	Ambetter Get Vaccinated 200	New Hampshire Motor Speedway
182	August 7, 2021	2021	54	Ty Gibbs	Skrewball Peanut Butter Whiskey 200	Watkins Glen International
183	October 16, 2021	2021	54	John Hunter Nemechek	Andy's Frozen Custard 335	Texas Motor Speedway
184	October 23, 2021	2021	54	Ty Gibbs	Kansas Lottery 300	Kansas Speedway
185	November 6, 2021	2021	18	Daniel Hemric	Xfinity Series Championship Race	Phoenix Raceway
186	March 5, 2022	2022	54	Ty Gibbs	Alsco Uniforms 300	Las Vegas Motor Speedway
187	March 19, 2022	2022	54	Ty Gibbs	Nalley Cars 250	Atlanta Motor Speedway
188	April 2, 2022	2022	54	Ty Gibbs	ToyotaCare 250	Richmond Raceway
189	April 8, 2022	2022	19	Brandon Jones	Call 811 Before You Dig 250	Martinsville Speedway
190	July 2, 2022	2022	54	Ty Gibbs	Henry 180	Road America
191	August 6, 2022	2022	54	Ty Gibbs	New Holland 250	Michigan International Speedway
192	October 29, 2022	2022	54	Ty Gibbs	Dead On Tools 250	Martinsville Speedway
193	November 5, 2022	2022	54	Ty Gibbs	NASCAR Xfinity Series Championship Race	Phoenix Raceway
194	February 26, 2023	2023	20	John Hunter Nemechek	Production Alliance Group 300	Auto Club Speedway
195	March 11, 2023	2023	18	Sammy Smith	United Rentals 200	Phoenix Raceway
196	April 15, 2023	2023	20	John Hunter Nemechek	Call 811.com Before You Dig 250	Martinsville Speedway
197	April 29, 2023	2023	19	Ryan Truex	A-GAME 200	Dover Motor Speedway
198	July 8, 2023	2023	20	John Hunter Nemechek	Alsco Uniforms 250	Atlanta Motor Speedway
199	July 15, 2023	2023	20	John Hunter Nemechek	Ambetter Health 200	New Hampshire Motor Speedway
200	August 5, 2023	2023	20	John Hunter Nemechek	Cabo Wabo Tequila 250	Michigan International Speedway
201	August 12, 2023	2023	19	Ty Gibbs	Pennzoil 150	Indianapolis Motor Speedway Road Course
202	September 2, 2023	2023	19	Denny Hamlin	Sport Clips Haircuts VFW 200	Darlington Raceway
203	September 9, 2023	2023	20	John Hunter Nemechek	Kansas Lottery 300	Kansas Speedway
204	September 23, 2023	2023	20	John Hunter Nemechek	Andy's Frozen Custard 300	Texas Motor Speedway
205	March 2, 2024	2024	20	John Hunter Nemechek	The LiUNA!	Las Vegas Motor Speedway
206	March 9, 2024	2024	81	Chandler Smith	Call811.com Every Dig. Every Time. 200	Phoenix Raceway
207	March 30, 2024	2024	81	Chandler Smith	ToyotaCare 250	Richmond Raceway
208	April 6, 2024	2024	20	Aric Almirola	Dude Wipes 250	Martinsville Speedway
209	April 27, 2024	2024	20	Ryan Truex	BetRivers 200	Dover Motor Speedway
210	June 22, 2024	2024	20	Christopher Bell	SciAps 200	New Hampshire Motor Speedway
211	June 29, 2024	2024	20	John Hunter Nemechek	Tennessee Lottery 250	Nashville Superspeedway
212	August 23, 2024	2024	20	Ryan Truex	Wawa 250	Daytona International Speedway
213	August 31, 2024	2024	20	Christopher Bell	Sport Clips Haircuts VFW 200	Darlington Raceway
214	September 28, 2024	2024	20	Aric Almirola	Kansas Lottery 300	Kansas Speedway
215	November 2, 2024	2024	20	Aric Almirola	National Debt Relief 250	Martinsville Speedway
216	March 8, 2025	2025	19	Aric Almirola	GOVX 200	Phoenix Raceway
217	April 5, 2025	2025	20	Brandon Jones	Sport Clips Haircuts VFW 200	Darlington Raceway
218	September 12, 2025	2025	19	Aric Almirola	Food City 300	Bristol Motor Speedway
219	September 27, 2025	2025	20	Brandon Jones	Kansas Lottery 300	Kansas Speedway
220	October 11, 2025	2025	19	Aric Almirola	Focused Health 302	Las Vegas Motor Speedway
221	October 25, 2025	2025	54	Taylor Gray	IAA and Ritchie Bros. 250	Martinsville Speedway
222	April 4, 2026	2026	18	William Sawalich	North Carolina Education Lottery 250	Rockingham Speedway
223	April 18, 2026	2026	54	Taylor Gray	Kansas Lottery 300	Kansas Speedway
224	July 4, 2026	2026	20	Brandon Jones	Cuervo 300	Chicagoland Speedway
225	November 7, 2026	2026	20	Brandon Jones	O'Reilly Auto Parts 300	Homestead-Miami Speedway

=== Non-points exhibition race wins ===
In 2016, NASCAR announced that Dash 4 Cash races would feature two heat races that determine the starting grid for the main event. Gibbs drivers won four of the eight heats held over the course the four Dash 4 Cash races.

NASCAR O'Reilly Auto Parts Series exhibition race victories
No.	Date	Season	Car #	Driver	Race	Track
1	April 16, 2016	2016	20	Erik Jones	Fitzgerald Glider Kits 300 Heat Race #1	Bristol Motor Speedway
2	April 23, 2016	2016	20	Erik Jones	ToyotaCare 250 Heat Race #1	Richmond International Raceway
3	July 23, 2016	2016	18	Kyle Busch	Lilly Diabetes 250 Heat Race #1	Indianapolis Motor Speedway
4	July 23, 2016	2016	20	Erik Jones	Lilly Diabetes 250 Heat Race #2	Indianapolis Motor Speedway

=== Wins by driver ===
Twenty-four drivers have won at least one points race in a Gibbs car, with Kyle Busch accounting for 90 of the 222 series victories. Joey Logano, Denny Hamlin, Christopher Bell, Erik Jones, and Ty Gibbs account for anywhere from 9 to 18 wins apiece. Hamlin and Busch each won an additional race for the team but were disqualified after failing post-race inspection in those races.

NASCAR O'Reilly Auto Parts Series victories by driver
Driver	Wins	First Win	Last Win
Kyle Busch	90	2008	2021
Christopher Bell	19	2017	2024
Denny Hamlin	18	2006	2023
Joey Logano	18	2008	2012
Ty Gibbs	12	2021	2023
Brandon Jones	9	2019	2026
Erik Jones	9	2015	2017
John Hunter Nemechek	9	2021	2024
Aric Almirola	7	2007	2025
Tony Stewart	5	2008	2008
Harrison Burton	4	2020	2020
Matt Kenseth	3	2013	2014
Daniel Suárez	3	2016	2016
Sam Hornish Jr.	2	2014	2016
Ryan Preece	2	2017	2018
Ryan Truex	2	2023	2024
Chandler Smith	2	2024	2024
Taylor Gray	2	2025	2026
Bobby Labonte	1	1998	1998
Mike McLaughlin	1	2001	2001
Mike Bliss	1	2004	2004
Elliott Sadler	1	2014	2014
Daniel Hemric	1	2021	2021
Sammy Smith	1	2023	2023
William Sawalich	1	2026	2026

=== Wins by track ===
Gibbs has won on 33 different tracks in the series, with the most wins coming at Phoenix Raceway, with 18 wins. Tracks on which the team has competed and not won include Nashville Fairgrounds Speedway, Hickory Speedway, Myrtle Beach Speedway, South Boston Speedway, Pikes Peak International Raceway, Nazareth Speedway, Memphis International Raceway, Circuit Gilles Villeneuve, Mid-Ohio Sports Car Course, Portland International Raceway, Sonoma Raceway, Chicago Street Course, and the Charlotte Roval.

NASCAR O'Reilly Auto Parts Series victories by racetrack
Order	Track	Wins	First Win	Last Win
1	Phoenix Raceway	18	2008	2025
2	Texas Motor Speedway	17	2008	2023
3	Dover Motor Speedway	15	2007	2024
3	Kansas Speedway	15	2008	2026
5	Darlington Raceway	14	1998	2025
5	Bristol Motor Speedway	14	2010	2025
7	New Hampshire Motor Speedway	13	2008	2024
8	Richmond Raceway	12	2008	2024
9	Auto Club Speedway	11	2008	2023
10	Charlotte Motor Speedway	10	2004	2021
11	Chicagoland Speedway	8	2008	2026
12	Michigan International Speedway	7	2007	2023
12	Iowa Speedway	7	2010	2019
12	Martinsville Speedway	7	2020	2025
15	Kentucky Speedway	6	2008	2018
15	Homestead–Miami Speedway	6	2009	2026
15	Atlanta Motor Speedway	6	2016	2023
17	Talladega Superspeedway	5	2001	2014
17	Las Vegas Motor Speedway	5	2016	2025
20	Daytona International Speedway	4	2008	2013
20	Indianapolis Motor Speedway	4	2013	2019
20	Nashville Superspeedway	4	2009	2024
23	Road America	3	2019	2022
24	Autódromo Hermanos Rodríguez	2	2006	2008
24	O'Reilly Raceway Park	2	2008	2010
24	Watkins Glen International	2	2017	2021
27	Milwaukee Mile	1	2007	2007
27	Gateway International Raceway	1	2009	2009
27	Pocono Raceway	1	2018	2018
27	Daytona Road Course	1	2021	2021
27	Circuit of the Americas	1	2021	2021
27	Indianapolis Road Course	1	2023	2023
27	Rockingham Speedway	1	2026	2026

== ARCA Menards Series ==
Joe Gibbs first field one-off entries for Jason Leffler in the then-ARCA Bondo/Mar-Hyde Series in 1999 and 2000. Leffler drove the No. 18 in both races and posted a best finish of fifth at Atlanta in 1999. In 2005, Gibbs returned to the series for three races, one each for J. J. Yeley, Denny Hamlin, and Aric Almirola. Yeley posted a best finish of third at Daytona. The team returned to the series with Matt Tifft piloting the No. 18 at Daytona in 2017. Riley Herbst began driving duties at the second race of the season, winning a few races later at Pocono, and drove full time through 2018. For 2019, Herbst shared the ride with Ty Gibbs; Gibbs scored two poles and won two races in the car. Herbst and Gibbs again shared the car in 2020, winning seven of the twenty races, before Gibbs took over full time duties in 2021, winning ten races and the series championship. In 2022, the No. 18 was fielded by Kyle Busch Motorsports, with Gibbs fielding the No. 81 for Brandon Jones for five races. Jones won three races and had a worst finish of third. The No. 18 returned full time in 2023, with Connor Mosack and William Sawalich driving; Sawalich won at Berlin, Milwaukee, and Bristol, while Mosack prevailed at Kansas.

=== ARCA Series wins ===
. – Gibbs won driver's championship

ARCA Series victories
No.	Date	Season	Car #	Driver	Race	Track
1	June 9, 2017	2017	18	Riley Herbst	General Tire 200	Pocono Raceway
2	June 22, 2019	2019	18	Ty Gibbs	Day to Day Coffee 150	World Wide Technology Raceway
3	September 14, 2019	2019	18	Ty Gibbs	Kentuckiana Ford Dealers Fall Classic 200	Salem Speedway
4	June 26, 2020	2020	18	Ty Gibbs	General Tire #AnywhereIsPossible 200	Pocono Raceway
5	July 11, 2020	2020	18	Ty Gibbs	General Tire 150	Kentucky Speedway
6	July 18, 2020	2020	18	Ty Gibbs	Shore Lunch 150	Iowa Speedway
7	August 9, 2020	2020	18	Riley Herbst	VizCom 200	Michigan International Speedway
8	August 29, 2020	2020	18	Ty Gibbs	Dutch Boy 150	World Wide Technology Raceway
9	September 19, 2020	2020	18	Ty Gibbs	Toyota 200 presented by Crosley Brands	Winchester Speedway
10	September 26, 2020	2020	18	Ty Gibbs	Sioux Chief PowerPEX 200	Memphis International Raceway
11 (Note: Combination race with ARCA Menards Series West)	March 12, 2021	2021	18	Ty Gibbs	General Tire 150	Phoenix Raceway
12	May 1, 2021	2021	18	Ty Gibbs	Dutch Boy 150	Kansas Speedway
13	May 22, 2021	2021	18	Ty Gibbs	Herr's Potato Chips 200	Toledo Speedway
14	May 29, 2021	2021	18	Ty Gibbs	General Tire 150	Charlotte Motor Speedway
15	June 4, 2021	2021	18	Ty Gibbs	Dawn 150	Mid-Ohio Sports Car Course
16 (Note: Combination race with ARCA Menards Series East)	July 24, 2021	2021	18	Ty Gibbs	Shore Lunch 150	Iowa Speedway
17	July 31, 2021	2021	18	Ty Gibbs	Calypso Lemonade 200	Winchester Speedway
18	August 20, 2021	2021	18	Ty Gibbs	Henry Ford Health System 200	Michigan International Speedway
19	August 29, 2021	2021	18	Ty Gibbs	Sprecher 150	Milwaukee Mile
20	September 16, 2021	2021	18	Ty Gibbs	Bush's Beans 200	Bristol Motor Speedway
21	May 27, 2022	2022	81	Brandon Jones	General Tire 150	Charlotte Motor Speedway
22	June 11, 2022	2022	81	Brandon Jones	Calypso Lemonade 150	Iowa Speedway
23	August 19, 2022	2022	81	Brandon Jones	General Tire Delivers 100	Watkins Glen International
24	June 17, 2023	2023	18	William Sawalich	Herr's Snacks 200	Berlin Raceway
25	August 27, 2023	2023	18	William Sawalich	Sprecher 150	Milwaukee Mile
26	September 8, 2023	2023	18	Connor Mosack	Sioux Chief Fast Track 150	Kansas Speedway
27	September 14, 2023	2023	18	William Sawalich	Bush's Beans 200	Bristol Motor Speedway
28	October 7, 2023	2023	18	William Sawalich	Shore Lunch 200	Toledo Speedway
29	March 8, 2024	2024	18	William Sawalich	General Tire 150	Phoenix Raceway
30	May 24, 2024	2024	18	Tanner Gray	General Tire 150	Charlotte Motor Speedway
31	June 21, 2024	2024	18	William Sawalich	Zinsser SmartCoat 150	Mid-Ohio Sports Car Course
32	June 29, 2024	2024	18	William Sawalich	Berlin ARCA 200	Berlin Raceway
33	July 27, 2024	2024	18	William Sawalich	Salem ARCA 200	Salem Speedway
34	August 3, 2024	2024	18	William Sawalich	Shore Lunch 250	Elko Speedway
35	August 18, 2024	2024	18	William Sawalich	Springfield ARCA 100	Illinois State Fairgrounds Racetrack
36	August 25, 2024	2024	18	William Sawalich	Sprecher 150	Milwaukee Mile
37	September 19, 2024	2024	18	William Sawalich	Bush's Beans 200	Bristol Motor Speedway
38	September 25, 2024	2024	18	Tanner Gray	Reese's 150	Kansas Speedway
39	October 5, 2024	2024	18	William Sawalich	Owens Corning 200	Toledo Speedway
40	March 7, 2025	2025	18	Brent Crews	General Tire 150	Phoenix Raceway
41	June 21, 2025	2025	18	Max Reaves	Shore Lunch 250	Elko Speedway
42	July 25, 2025	2025	18	Brent Crews	LiUNA! 150	Lucas Oil Indianapolis Raceway Park
43	August 22, 2025	2025	18	Max Reaves	Badger 200	Madison International Speedway
44	September 11, 2025	2025	18	Brent Crews	Bush's Beans 200	Bristol Motor Speedway
45	October 4, 2025	2025	18	Max Reaves	Owens Corning 200	Toledo Speedway
46	February 15, 2026	2026	18	Gio Ruggiero	General Tire 200	Daytona International Speedway
47	April 18, 2026	2026	18	Gio Ruggiero	Tide 150	Kansas Speedway
48	June 5, 2026	2026	18	Gio Ruggiero	Henry Ford Health 200	Michigan International Speedway
49	June 12, 2026	2026	18	Gio Ruggiero	Sunset Hill Shooting Range 150	Pocono Raceway
50	June 20, 2026	2026	18	Max Reaves	Herr's Snacks 200	Berlin Raceway
51	June 27, 2025	2026	18	Max Reaves	Shore Lunch 250	Elko Speedway
52	August 23, 2026	2026	18	Max Reaves	Calypso 100	Illinois State Fairgrounds Racetrack
53	September 12, 2026	2026	18	Max Reaves	Spruce 212	Salem Speedway

== All-time statistics ==
As of 9/27/26 – Includes NASCAR's Cup Series, O'Reilly Auto Parts Series, Truck Series, and ARCA Series races

- Races Completed: 2,383
  - Cup Series: 1,202; O'Reilly Auto Parts Series: 934; Truck Series: 60; ARCA Series: 187
- Wins: 512
  - Cup Series: 235; O'Reilly Auto Parts Series: 224; Truck Series: 0; ARCA Series: 53
- Poles: 423
  - Cup Series: 173; O'Reilly Auto Parts Series: 202; Truck Series: 0; ARCA Series: 48
- Championships: 10
  - Cup Series: 5; O'Reilly Auto Parts Series: 4; Truck Series: 0; ARCA Series: 1

* – includes results by multiple teams, sometimes up to 4 teams per race

== See also ==
- List of all-time NASCAR Cup Series winners
- List of NASCAR race wins by Petty Enterprises
- List of NASCAR race wins by Hendrick Motorsports
- List of NASCAR race wins by Kyle Busch
- List of NASCAR race wins by Tony Stewart
- List of NASCAR race wins by Joey Logano
