= 2001 Pennsylvania 500 =

20th race of the 2001 NASCAR Winston Cup Series

2001 Pennsylvania 500 presented by Pep Boys
Race details
- Race 20 of 36 in the 2001 NASCAR Winston Cup Series
- The 2001 Pennsylvania 500 program cover.
- Date: July 29, 2001
- Official name: 29th Annual Pennsylvania 500 presented by Pep Boys
- Location: Long Pond, Pennsylvania, Pocono Raceway
- Course: Permanent racing facility
- Course length: 2.5 miles (4.0 km)
- Distance: 200 laps, 500 mi (804.672 km)
- Average speed: 134.59 miles per hour (216.60 km/h)

Pole position
Driver	Todd Bodine	Haas-Carter Motorsports
- Time: 52.840

Most laps led
Driver	Jeff Gordon	Hendrick Motorsports
- Laps: 121

Winner
No. 18	Bobby Labonte	Joe Gibbs Racing

Television in the United States
- Network: TNT
- Announcers: Allen Bestwick, Benny Parsons, Wally Dallenbach Jr.

Radio in the United States
- Radio: Motor Racing Network

The 2001 Pennsylvania 500 presented by Pep Boys was the 20th stock car race of the 2001 NASCAR Winston Cup Series and the 29th iteration of the event. The race was held on Sunday, July 29, 2001, in Long Pond, Pennsylvania, at Pocono Raceway, a 2.5 miles (4.0 km) triangular permanent course. The race took the scheduled 200 laps to complete. In the final laps of the race, Bobby Labonte, driving for Joe Gibbs Racing, would pass eventual second-place driver, Dale Earnhardt, Inc. driver Dale Earnhardt Jr. to win his 17th career NASCAR Winston Cup Series win and his first of the season. To fill out the podium, Tony Stewart, driving for Joe Gibbs Racing, would finish third.

== Background ==
The race was held at Pocono Raceway, which is a three-turn superspeedway located in Long Pond, Pennsylvania. The track hosts two annual NASCAR Sprint Cup Series races, as well as one Xfinity Series and Camping World Truck Series event. Until 2019, the track also hosted an IndyCar Series race.

Pocono Raceway is one of a very few NASCAR tracks not owned by either Speedway Motorsports, Inc. or International Speedway Corporation. It is operated by the Igdalsky siblings Brandon, Nicholas, and sister Ashley, and cousins Joseph IV and Chase Mattioli, all of whom are third-generation members of the family-owned Mattco Inc, started by Joseph II and Rose Mattioli.

Outside of the NASCAR races, the track is used throughout the year by the Sports Car Club of America (SCCA) and motorcycle clubs as well as racing schools and an IndyCar race. The triangular oval also has three separate infield sections of racetrack – North Course, East Course and South Course. Each of these infield sections uses a separate portion of the tri-oval to complete the track. During regular non-race weekends, multiple clubs can use the track by running on different infield sections. Also some of the infield sections can be run in either direction, or multiple infield sections can be put together – such as running the North Course and the South Course and using the tri-oval to connect the two.

=== Entry list ===
- (R) denotes rookie driver.

#	Driver	Team	Make
1	Steve Park	Dale Earnhardt, Inc.	Chevrolet
01	Jason Leffler (R)	Chip Ganassi Racing with Felix Sabates	Dodge
2	Rusty Wallace	Penske Racing South	Ford
4	Kevin Lepage	Morgan–McClure Motorsports	Chevrolet
5	Terry Labonte	Hendrick Motorsports	Chevrolet
6	Mark Martin	Roush Racing	Ford
7	Mike Wallace	Ultra Motorsports	Ford
8	Dale Earnhardt Jr.	Dale Earnhardt, Inc.	Chevrolet
9	Bill Elliott	Evernham Motorsports	Dodge
10	Johnny Benson Jr.	MBV Motorsports	Pontiac
11	Brett Bodine	Brett Bodine Racing	Ford
12	Jeremy Mayfield	Penske Racing South	Ford
14	Ron Hornaday Jr. (R)	A. J. Foyt Enterprises	Pontiac
15	Michael Waltrip	Dale Earnhardt, Inc.	Chevrolet
17	Matt Kenseth	Roush Racing	Ford
18	Bobby Labonte	Joe Gibbs Racing	Pontiac
19	Casey Atwood (R)	Evernham Motorsports	Dodge
20	Tony Stewart	Joe Gibbs Racing	Pontiac
21	Elliott Sadler	Wood Brothers Racing	Ford
22	Ward Burton	Bill Davis Racing	Dodge
24	Jeff Gordon	Hendrick Motorsports	Chevrolet
25	Jerry Nadeau	Hendrick Motorsports	Chevrolet
26	Jimmy Spencer	Haas-Carter Motorsports	Ford
27	Rick Mast	Eel River Racing	Pontiac
28	Ricky Rudd	Robert Yates Racing	Ford
29	Kevin Harvick (R)	Richard Childress Racing	Chevrolet
31	Robby Gordon	Richard Childress Racing	Chevrolet
32	Ricky Craven	PPI Motorsports	Ford
33	Joe Nemechek	Andy Petree Racing	Chevrolet
36	Ken Schrader	MBV Motorsports	Pontiac
40	Sterling Marlin	Chip Ganassi Racing with Felix Sabates	Dodge
43	John Andretti	Petty Enterprises	Dodge
44	Buckshot Jones	Petty Enterprises	Dodge
45	Kyle Petty	Petty Enterprises	Dodge
49	Andy Hillenburg	BAM Racing	Pontiac
55	Bobby Hamilton	Andy Petree Racing	Chevrolet
66	Todd Bodine	Haas-Carter Motorsports	Ford
77	Robert Pressley	Jasper Motorsports	Ford
85	Carl Long	Mansion Motorsports	Ford
88	Dale Jarrett	Robert Yates Racing	Ford
90	Hut Stricklin	Donlavey Racing	Ford
92	Stacy Compton	Melling Racing	Dodge
93	Dave Blaney	Bill Davis Racing	Dodge
97	Kurt Busch (R)	Roush Racing	Ford
99	Jeff Burton	Roush Racing	Ford
Official entry list

== Practice ==
=== First practice ===
The first practice session was held on Friday, July 27, at 11:30 AM EST. The session would last for two hours and 30 minutes. Ricky Rudd, driving for Robert Yates Racing, would set the fastest time in the session, with a lap of 53.163 and an average speed of 169.291 miles per hour (272.447 km/h).

Pos.	#	Driver	Team	Make	Time	Speed
1	28	Ricky Rudd	Robert Yates Racing	Ford	53.163	169.291
2	6	Mark Martin	Roush Racing	Ford	53.213	169.068
3	26	Jimmy Spencer	Haas-Carter Motorsports	Ford	53.318	168.799
Full first practice results

=== Second practice ===
The second practice session was held on Saturday, July 28, at 10:45 AM EST. The session would last for 45 minutes. Jeff Gordon, driving for Hendrick Motorsports, would set the fastest time in the session, with a lap of 54.341 and an average speed of 165.621 miles per hour (266.541 km/h).

Pos.	#	Driver	Team	Make	Time	Speed
1	24	Jeff Gordon	Hendrick Motorsports	Chevrolet	54.341	165.621
2	28	Ricky Rudd	Robert Yates Racing	Ford	54.454	165.277
3	18	Bobby Labonte	Joe Gibbs Racing	Pontiac	54.680	164.594
Full second practice results

=== Third and final practice ===
The final practice session, sometimes referred to as Happy Hour, was held on Saturday, June 16, at 12:15 AM EST. The session would last for 45 minutes. Jeff Gordon, driving for Hendrick Motorsports, would set the fastest time in the session, with a lap of 54.859 and an average speed of 164.057 miles per hour (264.024 km/h).

Pos.	#	Driver	Team	Make	Time	Speed
1	24	Jeff Gordon	Hendrick Motorsports	Chevrolet	54.859	164.057
2	28	Ricky Rudd	Robert Yates Racing	Ford	54.991	163.663
3	6	Mark Martin	Roush Racing	Ford	55.002	163.630
Full Happy Hour practice results

== Qualifying ==
Qualifying was held on Friday, July 27, at 3:00 PM EST. Each driver would have two laps to set a fastest time; the fastest of the two would count as their official qualifying lap. Positions 1-36 would be decided on time, while positions 37-43 would be based on provisionals. Six spots are awarded by the use of provisionals based on owner's points. The seventh is awarded to a past champion who has not otherwise qualified for the race. If no past champ needs the provisional, the next team in the owner points will be awarded a provisional.

Todd Bodine, driving for Haas-Carter Motorsports, would win the pole, setting a time of 52.840 and an average speed of 170.325 miles per hour (274.112 km/h).

Two drivers would fail to qualify: Andy Hillenburg and Carl Long.

=== Full qualifying results ===
Pos.	#	Driver	Team	Make	Time	Speed
1	66	Todd Bodine	Haas-Carter Motorsports	Ford	52.840	170.325
2	28	Ricky Rudd	Robert Yates Racing	Ford	52.856	170.274
3	6	Mark Martin	Roush Racing	Ford	53.059	169.622
4	36	Ken Schrader	MB2 Motorsports	Pontiac	53.100	162.492
5	19	Casey Atwood (R)	Evernham Motorsports	Dodge	53.101	169.488
6	29	Kevin Harvick (R)	Richard Childress Racing	Chevrolet	53.163	169.291
7	26	Jimmy Spencer	Haas-Carter Motorsports	Ford	53.200	169.173
8	24	Jeff Gordon	Hendrick Motorsports	Chevrolet	53.203	169.163
9	10	Johnny Benson Jr.	MBV Motorsports	Pontiac	53.291	168.884
10	40	Sterling Marlin	Chip Ganassi Racing with Felix Sabates	Dodge	53.303	168.846
11	18	Bobby Labonte	Joe Gibbs Racing	Pontiac	53.327	168.770
12	8	Dale Earnhardt Jr.	Dale Earnhardt, Inc.	Chevrolet	53.329	168.764
13	20	Tony Stewart	Joe Gibbs Racing	Pontiac	53.429	168.448
14	9	Bill Elliott	Evernham Motorsports	Dodge	53.439	168.416
15	93	Dave Blaney	Bill Davis Racing	Dodge	53.466	168.331
16	77	Robert Pressley	Jasper Motorsports	Ford	53.483	168.278
17	92	Stacy Compton	Melling Racing	Dodge	53.488	168.262
18	99	Jeff Burton	Roush Racing	Ford	53.491	168.253
19	4	Kevin Lepage	Morgan–McClure Motorsports	Chevrolet	53.536	168.111
20	32	Ricky Craven	PPI Motorsports	Ford	53.567	168.014
21	01	Jason Leffler (R)	Chip Ganassi Racing with Felix Sabates	Dodge	53.579	167.976
22	2	Rusty Wallace	Penske Racing South	Ford	53.586	167.954
23	15	Michael Waltrip	Dale Earnhardt, Inc.	Chevrolet	53.593	167.932
24	17	Matt Kenseth	Roush Racing	Ford	53.602	167.904
25	12	Jeremy Mayfield	Penske Racing South	Ford	53.699	167.601
26	33	Joe Nemechek	Andy Petree Racing	Chevrolet	53.757	167.420
27	11	Brett Bodine	Brett Bodine Racing	Ford	53.758	167.417
28	43	John Andretti	Petty Enterprises	Dodge	53.892	167.001
29	55	Bobby Hamilton	Andy Petree Racing	Chevrolet	53.896	166.988
30	90	Hut Stricklin	Donlavey Racing	Ford	53.946	166.833
31	14	Ron Hornaday Jr. (R)	A. J. Foyt Enterprises	Pontiac	53.965	166.775
32	7	Mike Wallace	Ultra Motorsports	Ford	53.979	166.731
33	21	Elliott Sadler	Wood Brothers Racing	Ford	54.021	166.602
34	22	Ward Burton	Bill Davis Racing	Dodge	54.041	166.540
35	97	Kurt Busch (R)	Roush Racing	Ford	54.200	166.052
36	31	Robby Gordon	Richard Childress Racing	Chevrolet	54.273	165.828
Provisionals
37	88	Dale Jarrett	Robert Yates Racing	Ford	54.754	164.372
38	1	Steve Park	Dale Earnhardt, Inc.	Chevrolet	54.308	165.721
39	25	Jerry Nadeau	Hendrick Motorsports	Chevrolet	54.366	165.545
40	5	Terry Labonte	Hendrick Motorsports	Chevrolet	54.613	164.796
41	44	Buckshot Jones	Petty Enterprises	Dodge	54.476	165.210
42	45	Kyle Petty	Petty Enterprises	Dodge	54.452	165.283
43	27	Rick Mast	Eel River Racing	Pontiac	54.433	165.341
Failed to qualify
44	49	Andy Hillenburg	BAM Racing	Pontiac	54.877	164.003
45	85	Carl Long	Mansion Motorsports	Ford	55.640	161.754
Official qualifying results

== Race results ==
Fin	St	#	Driver	Team	Make	Laps	Led	Status	Pts	Winnings
1	11	18	Bobby Labonte	Joe Gibbs Racing	Pontiac	200	4	running	180	$189,427
2	12	8	Dale Earnhardt Jr.	Dale Earnhardt, Inc.	Chevrolet	200	31	running	175	$119,923
3	13	20	Tony Stewart	Joe Gibbs Racing	Pontiac	200	0	running	165	$91,800
4	14	9	Bill Elliott	Evernham Motorsports	Dodge	200	1	running	165	$90,948
5	9	10	Johnny Benson Jr.	MBV Motorsports	Pontiac	200	8	running	160	$68,895
6	22	2	Rusty Wallace	Penske Racing South	Ford	200	0	running	150	$88,555
7	3	6	Mark Martin	Roush Racing	Ford	200	4	running	151	$86,116
8	8	24	Jeff Gordon	Hendrick Motorsports	Chevrolet	200	121	running	152	$96,992
9	16	77	Robert Pressley	Jasper Motorsports	Ford	200	0	running	138	$63,025
10	20	32	Ricky Craven	PPI Motorsports	Ford	200	0	running	134	$50,465
11	2	28	Ricky Rudd	Robert Yates Racing	Ford	200	23	running	135	$73,612
12	7	26	Jimmy Spencer	Haas-Carter Motorsports	Ford	200	1	running	132	$58,435
13	38	1	Steve Park	Dale Earnhardt, Inc.	Chevrolet	200	0	running	124	$65,908
14	24	17	Matt Kenseth	Roush Racing	Ford	200	3	running	126	$46,840
15	5	19	Casey Atwood (R)	Evernham Motorsports	Dodge	200	0	running	118	$41,915
16	10	40	Sterling Marlin	Chip Ganassi Racing with Felix Sabates	Dodge	200	0	running	115	$54,776
17	4	36	Ken Schrader	MB2 Motorsports	Pontiac	200	0	running	112	$50,405
18	25	12	Jeremy Mayfield	Penske Racing South	Ford	200	0	running	109	$76,799
19	23	15	Michael Waltrip	Dale Earnhardt, Inc.	Chevrolet	200	0	running	106	$43,765
20	6	29	Kevin Harvick (R)	Richard Childress Racing	Chevrolet	200	0	running	103	$83,667
21	21	01	Jason Leffler (R)	Chip Ganassi Racing with Felix Sabates	Dodge	200	0	running	100	$48,090
22	15	93	Dave Blaney	Bill Davis Racing	Dodge	200	0	running	97	$36,415
23	26	33	Joe Nemechek	Andy Petree Racing	Chevrolet	199	0	running	94	$64,360
24	39	25	Jerry Nadeau	Hendrick Motorsports	Chevrolet	199	0	running	91	$43,765
25	32	7	Mike Wallace	Ultra Motorsports	Ford	198	0	running	88	$43,940
26	33	21	Elliott Sadler	Wood Brothers Racing	Ford	198	0	running	85	$53,390
27	28	43	John Andretti	Petty Enterprises	Dodge	198	0	running	82	$70,267
28	36	31	Robby Gordon	Richard Childress Racing	Chevrolet	198	0	running	79	$64,414
29	29	55	Bobby Hamilton	Andy Petree Racing	Chevrolet	197	0	running	76	$39,915
30	31	14	Ron Hornaday Jr. (R)	A. J. Foyt Enterprises	Pontiac	197	0	running	73	$31,765
31	42	45	Kyle Petty	Petty Enterprises	Dodge	196	0	running	70	$32,115
32	17	92	Stacy Compton	Melling Racing	Dodge	195	0	running	67	$31,465
33	27	11	Brett Bodine	Brett Bodine Racing	Ford	194	0	running	64	$31,265
34	40	5	Terry Labonte	Hendrick Motorsports	Chevrolet	192	0	running	61	$63,770
35	43	27	Rick Mast	Eel River Racing	Pontiac	192	0	running	58	$30,440
36	18	99	Jeff Burton	Roush Racing	Ford	188	1	running	60	$76,061
37	35	97	Kurt Busch (R)	Roush Racing	Ford	187	0	running	52	$38,225
38	34	22	Ward Burton	Bill Davis Racing	Dodge	184	0	crash	49	$63,310
39	41	44	Buckshot Jones	Petty Enterprises	Dodge	183	0	running	46	$38,125
40	30	90	Hut Stricklin	Donlavey Racing	Ford	177	0	running	43	$30,050
41	37	88	Dale Jarrett	Robert Yates Racing	Ford	152	1	crash	45	$75,027
42	19	4	Kevin Lepage	Morgan–McClure Motorsports	Chevrolet	148	0	crash	37	$29,950
43	1	66	Todd Bodine	Haas-Carter Motorsports	Ford	128	2	handling	39	$37,876
Official race results

Previous race: 2001 New England 300	NASCAR Winston Cup Series; 2001 season	Next race: 2001 Brickyard 400
