= 2000 Kmart 400 =

14th race of the 2000 NASCAR Winston Cup Series

Race details
- Race 14 of 34 in the 2000 NASCAR Winston Cup Series
- The 2000 Kmart 400 program cover.
- Date: June 11, 2000
- Official name: 32nd Annual Kmart 400
- Location: Brooklyn, Michigan, Michigan International Speedway
- Course: Permanent racing facility
- Course length: 2 miles (3.2 km)
- Distance: 194 laps, 388 mi (624.425 km)
- Scheduled distance: 200 laps, 400 mi (643.737 km)
- Average speed: 143.926 miles per hour (231.626 km/h)

Pole position
Driver	Bobby Labonte	Joe Gibbs Racing
- Time: 37.918

Most laps led
Driver	Jeremy Mayfield	Penske-Kranefuss Racing
- Laps: 85

Winner
No. 20	Tony Stewart	Joe Gibbs Racing

Television in the United States
- Network: CBS (shifted after first rain delay to TNN)
- Announcers: Mike Joy, Ned Jarrett, Buddy Baker

Radio in the United States
- Radio: Motor Racing Network

The 2000 Kmart 400 was the 14th stock car race of the 2000 NASCAR Winston Cup Series and the 32nd iteration of the event. The race was held on Sunday, June 11, 2000, in Brooklyn, Michigan, at Michigan International Speedway, a two-mile (3.2 km) moderate-banked D-shaped speedway. The race was shortened from its scheduled 200 laps to 194 due to inclement weather. At race's end, Tony Stewart, driving for Joe Gibbs Racing, would manage to hold off the field until lap 193 when the race was stopped for rain. The win was Stewart's fifth career NASCAR Winston Cup Series win and his second of the season. To fill out the podium, Dale Earnhardt of Richard Childress Racing and Bobby Labonte of Joe Gibbs Racing would finish second and third, respectively.

== Background ==
The layout of Michigan International Speedway, the venue where the race was held.

The race was held at Michigan International Speedway, a two-mile (3.2 km) moderate-banked D-shaped speedway located in Brooklyn, Michigan. The track is used primarily for NASCAR events. It is known as a "sister track" to Texas World Speedway as MIS's oval design was a direct basis of TWS, with moderate modifications to the banking in the corners, and was used as the basis of Auto Club Speedway. The track is owned by International Speedway Corporation. Michigan International Speedway is recognized as one of motorsports' premier facilities because of its wide racing surface and high banking (by open-wheel standards; the 18-degree banking is modest by stock car standards).

=== Entry list ===
- (R) denotes rookie driver.

#	Driver	Team	Make
1	Steve Park	Dale Earnhardt, Inc.	Chevrolet
2	Rusty Wallace	Penske-Kranefuss Racing	Ford
3	Dale Earnhardt	Richard Childress Racing	Chevrolet
4	Bobby Hamilton	Morgan–McClure Motorsports	Chevrolet
5	Terry Labonte	Hendrick Motorsports	Chevrolet
6	Mark Martin	Roush Racing	Ford
7	Michael Waltrip	Mattei Motorsports	Chevrolet
8	Dale Earnhardt Jr. (R)	Dale Earnhardt, Inc.	Chevrolet
9	Stacy Compton (R)	Melling Racing	Ford
10	Johnny Benson Jr.	Tyler Jet Motorsports	Pontiac
11	Brett Bodine	Brett Bodine Racing	Ford
12	Jeremy Mayfield	Penske-Kranefuss Racing	Ford
13	Robby Gordon	Team Menard	Ford
14	Rick Mast	A. J. Foyt Enterprises	Pontiac
16	Kevin Lepage	Roush Racing	Ford
17	Matt Kenseth (R)	Roush Racing	Ford
18	Bobby Labonte	Joe Gibbs Racing	Pontiac
20	Tony Stewart	Joe Gibbs Racing	Pontiac
21	Elliott Sadler	Wood Brothers Racing	Ford
22	Ward Burton	Bill Davis Racing	Pontiac
24	Jeff Gordon	Hendrick Motorsports	Chevrolet
25	Jerry Nadeau	Hendrick Motorsports	Chevrolet
26	Jimmy Spencer	Haas-Carter Motorsports	Ford
27	Mike Bliss (R)	Eel River Racing	Pontiac
28	Ricky Rudd	Robert Yates Racing	Ford
31	Mike Skinner	Richard Childress Racing	Chevrolet
32	Scott Pruett (R)	PPI Motorsports	Ford
33	Joe Nemechek	Andy Petree Racing	Chevrolet
36	Ken Schrader	MB2 Motorsports	Pontiac
40	Sterling Marlin	Team SABCO	Chevrolet
42	Kenny Irwin Jr.	Team SABCO	Chevrolet
43	John Andretti	Petty Enterprises	Pontiac
44	Kyle Petty	Petty Enterprises	Pontiac
50	Ricky Craven	Midwest Transit Racing	Chevrolet
55	Kenny Wallace	Andy Petree Racing	Chevrolet
60	Geoff Bodine	Joe Bessey Racing	Chevrolet
66	Darrell Waltrip	Haas-Carter Motorsports	Ford
71	Dave Marcis	Marcis Auto Racing	Chevrolet
75	Wally Dallenbach Jr.	Galaxy Motorsports	Ford
77	Robert Pressley	Jasper Motorsports	Ford
88	Dale Jarrett	Robert Yates Racing	Ford
90	Ed Berrier (R)	Donlavey Racing	Ford
93	Dave Blaney (R)	Bill Davis Racing	Pontiac
94	Bill Elliott	Bill Elliott Racing	Ford
97	Chad Little	Roush Racing	Ford
99	Jeff Burton	Roush Racing	Ford
Official entry list

== Practice ==
=== First practice ===
The first practice session was held on Friday, June 9, at 10:15 AM EST, and would last for one hour and 40 minutes. Jerry Nadeau of Hendrick Motorsports would set the fastest time in the session, with a lap of 38.386 and an average speed of 187.568 mph (301.861 km/h).

Pos.	#	Driver	Team	Make	Time	Speed
1	25	Jerry Nadeau	Hendrick Motorsports	Chevrolet	38.386	187.568
2	22	Ward Burton	Bill Davis Racing	Pontiac	38.388	187.558
3	24	Jeff Gordon	Hendrick Motorsports	Chevrolet	38.440	187.304
Full first practice results

=== Second practice ===
The second practice session was held on Friday, June 9, at 1:00 PM EST, and would last for an hour and 30 minutes. Ricky Rudd of Robert Yates Racing would set the fastest time in the session, with a lap of 38.387 and an average speed of 187.563 mph (301.853 km/h).

Pos.	#	Driver	Team	Make	Time	Speed
1	28	Ricky Rudd	Robert Yates Racing	Ford	38.387	187.563
2	88	Dale Jarrett	Robert Yates Racing	Ford	38.406	187.471
3	24	Jeff Gordon	Hendrick Motorsports	Chevrolet	38.410	187.451
Full second practice results

=== Third practice ===
The third practice session was held on Saturday, June 10, at 9:30 AM EST, and would last for one hour. Geoff Bodine of Joe Bessey Racing would set the fastest time in the session, with a lap of 38.550 and an average speed of 186.770 mph (300.577 km/h).

Pos.	#	Driver	Team	Make	Time	Speed
1	60	Geoff Bodine	Joe Bessey Racing	Chevrolet	38.550	186.770
2	27	Mike Bliss (R)	Eel River Racing	Pontiac	38.830	185.424
3	7	Michael Waltrip	Mattei Motorsports	Chevrolet	38.832	185.414
Full third practice results

=== Fourth and final practice ===
The fourth and final practice session, sometimes referred to as Happy Hour, was held on Saturday, June 10, after the preliminary 2000 Flagstar 200 ARCA Re/Max Series race, and lasted for up to an hour. Dale Earnhardt Jr. of Dale Earnhardt, Inc. would set the fastest time in the session, with a lap of 39.716 and an average speed of 181.287 mph (291.753 km/h).

Around 38 minutes into the session, Elliott Sadler would suffer a blowover crash after blowing a right-rear tire, flipping around a dozen times. It was later revealed that the car barrel rolled higher than the catch fencing, and the majority of footage of the crash was subsequently destroyed. While bruised, Elliott would still race with a backup.

Pos.	#	Driver	Team	Make	Time	Speed
1	8	Dale Earnhardt Jr. (R)	Dale Earnhardt, Inc.	Chevrolet	39.716	181.287
2	17	Matt Kenseth (R)	Roush Racing	Ford	39.969	180.139
3	1	Steve Park	Dale Earnhardt, Inc.	Chevrolet	39.971	180.130
Full Happy Hour practice results

== Qualifying ==
Qualifying was split into two rounds. The first round was held on Friday, June 2, at 3:30 PM EST. Each driver would have two laps to set a fastest time; the fastest of the two would count as their official qualifying lap. During the first round, the top 25 drivers in the round would be guaranteed a starting spot in the race. If a driver was not able to guarantee a spot in the first round, they had the option to scrub their time from the first round and try and run a faster lap time in a second round qualifying run, held on Saturday, June 3, at 11:30 AM EST. As with the first round, each driver would have two laps to set a fastest time; the fastest of the two would count as their official qualifying lap. Positions 26-36 would be decided on time, while positions 37-43 would be based on provisionals. Six spots are awarded by the use of provisionals based on owner's points. The seventh is awarded to a past champion who has not otherwise qualified for the race. If no past champion needs the provisional, the next team in the owner points will be awarded a provisional.

Bobby Labonte of Joe Gibbs Racing would win the pole, setting a time of 37.918 and an average speed of 189.883 miles per hour (305.587 km/h).

Three drivers would fail to qualify: Darrell Waltrip, Ricky Craven, and Dave Marcis.

=== Full qualifying results ===
Pos.	#	Driver	Team	Make	Time	Speed
1	18	Bobby Labonte	Joe Gibbs Racing	Pontiac	37.918	189.883
2	28	Ricky Rudd	Robert Yates Racing	Ford	38.091	189.021
3	24	Jeff Gordon	Hendrick Motorsports	Chevrolet	38.174	188.610
4	2	Rusty Wallace	Penske-Kranefuss Racing	Ford	38.275	188.112
5	33	Joe Nemechek	Andy Petree Racing	Chevrolet	38.287	188.053
6	8	Dale Earnhardt Jr. (R)	Dale Earnhardt, Inc.	Chevrolet	38.348	187.754
7	99	Jeff Burton	Roush Racing	Ford	38.375	187.622
8	94	Bill Elliott	Bill Elliott Racing	Ford	38.403	187.485
9	3	Dale Earnhardt	Richard Childress Racing	Chevrolet	38.409	187.456
10	43	John Andretti	Petty Enterprises	Pontiac	38.451	187.251
11	10	Johnny Benson Jr.	Tyler Jet Motorsports	Pontiac	38.452	187.246
12	16	Kevin Lepage	Roush Racing	Ford	38.471	187.154
13	22	Ward Burton	Bill Davis Racing	Pontiac	38.476	187.130
14	1	Steve Park	Dale Earnhardt, Inc.	Chevrolet	38.490	187.062
15	7	Michael Waltrip	Mattei Motorsports	Chevrolet	38.502	187.003
16	32	Scott Pruett (R)	PPI Motorsports	Ford	38.554	186.751
17	93	Dave Blaney (R)	Bill Davis Racing	Pontiac	38.561	186.717
18	42	Kenny Irwin Jr.	Team SABCO	Chevrolet	38.576	186.645
19	6	Mark Martin	Roush Racing	Ford	38.588	186.587
20	36	Ken Schrader	MB2 Motorsports	Pontiac	38.598	186.538
21	21	Elliott Sadler	Wood Brothers Racing	Ford	38.601	186.524
22	12	Jeremy Mayfield	Penske-Kranefuss Racing	Ford	38.632	186.374
23	17	Matt Kenseth (R)	Roush Racing	Ford	38.661	186.234
24	75	Wally Dallenbach Jr.	Galaxy Motorsports	Ford	38.667	186.205
25	13	Robby Gordon	Team Menard	Ford	38.667	186.205
26	88	Dale Jarrett	Robert Yates Racing	Ford	38.559	186.727
27	27	Mike Bliss (R)	Eel River Racing	Pontiac	38.608	186.490
28	20	Tony Stewart	Joe Gibbs Racing	Pontiac	38.689	186.099
29	14	Rick Mast	A. J. Foyt Enterprises	Pontiac	38.701	186.042
30	31	Mike Skinner	Richard Childress Racing	Chevrolet	38.739	185.859
31	77	Robert Pressley	Jasper Motorsports	Ford	38.743	185.840
32	25	Jerry Nadeau	Hendrick Motorsports	Chevrolet	38.747	185.821
33	9	Stacy Compton (R)	Melling Racing	Ford	38.748	185.816
34	55	Kenny Wallace	Andy Petree Racing	Chevrolet	38.791	185.610
35	44	Kyle Petty	Petty Enterprises	Pontiac	38.819	185.476
36	60	Geoff Bodine	Joe Bessey Racing	Chevrolet	38.833	185.409
Provisionals
37	5	Terry Labonte	Hendrick Motorsports	Chevrolet	38.948	184.862
38	97	Chad Little	Roush Racing	Ford	38.848	185.338
39	40	Sterling Marlin	Team SABCO	Chevrolet	39.041	184.422
40	26	Jimmy Spencer	Haas-Carter Motorsports	Ford	38.852	185.319
41	4	Bobby Hamilton	Morgan–McClure Motorsports	Chevrolet	38.942	184.890
42	11	Brett Bodine	Brett Bodine Racing	Ford	39.259	183.397
43	90	Ed Berrier (R)	Donlavey Racing	Ford	39.428	182.611
Failed to qualify
44	66	Darrell Waltrip	Haas-Carter Motorsports	Ford	38.920	184.995
45	50	Ricky Craven	Midwest Transit Racing	Chevrolet	39.022	184.511
46	71	Dave Marcis	Marcis Auto Racing	Chevrolet	39.035	184.450
Official first round qualifying results
Official starting lineup

== Race results ==
Fin	St	#	Driver	Team	Make	Laps	Led	Status	Pts	Winnings
1	28	20	Tony Stewart	Joe Gibbs Racing	Pontiac	194	13	running	180	$123,800
2	9	3	Dale Earnhardt	Richard Childress Racing	Chevrolet	194	0	running	170	$80,575
3	1	18	Bobby Labonte	Joe Gibbs Racing	Pontiac	194	39	running	170	$79,175
4	26	88	Dale Jarrett	Robert Yates Racing	Ford	194	3	running	165	$71,285
5	31	77	Robert Pressley	Jasper Motorsports	Ford	194	5	running	160	$51,000
6	13	22	Ward Burton	Bill Davis Racing	Pontiac	194	0	running	150	$55,875
7	4	2	Rusty Wallace	Penske-Kranefuss Racing	Ford	194	3	running	151	$49,625
8	8	94	Bill Elliott	Bill Elliott Racing	Ford	194	0	running	142	$44,750
9	10	43	John Andretti	Petty Enterprises	Pontiac	194	1	running	143	$50,200
10	39	40	Sterling Marlin	Team SABCO	Chevrolet	194	0	running	134	$48,100
11	7	99	Jeff Burton	Roush Racing	Ford	194	1	running	135	$54,750
12	2	28	Ricky Rudd	Robert Yates Racing	Ford	194	40	running	132	$41,050
13	6	8	Dale Earnhardt Jr. (R)	Dale Earnhardt, Inc.	Chevrolet	193	0	running	124	$38,200
14	3	24	Jeff Gordon	Hendrick Motorsports	Chevrolet	193	2	running	126	$47,250
15	40	26	Jimmy Spencer	Haas-Carter Motorsports	Ford	193	0	running	118	$41,650
16	20	36	Ken Schrader	MB2 Motorsports	Pontiac	193	0	running	115	$30,375
17	23	17	Matt Kenseth (R)	Roush Racing	Ford	193	0	running	112	$37,850
18	5	33	Joe Nemechek	Andy Petree Racing	Chevrolet	193	0	running	109	$37,315
19	16	32	Scott Pruett (R)	PPI Motorsports	Ford	193	0	running	106	$26,000
20	30	31	Mike Skinner	Richard Childress Racing	Chevrolet	193	0	running	103	$41,085
21	12	16	Kevin Lepage	Roush Racing	Ford	193	2	running	105	$36,365
22	15	7	Michael Waltrip	Mattei Motorsports	Chevrolet	193	0	running	97	$36,150
23	32	25	Jerry Nadeau	Hendrick Motorsports	Chevrolet	193	0	running	94	$35,890
24	11	10	Johnny Benson Jr.	Tyler Jet Motorsports	Pontiac	193	0	running	91	$27,670
25	17	93	Dave Blaney (R)	Bill Davis Racing	Pontiac	193	0	running	88	$24,120
26	37	5	Terry Labonte	Hendrick Motorsports	Chevrolet	193	0	running	85	$41,960
27	21	21	Elliott Sadler	Wood Brothers Racing	Ford	193	0	running	82	$36,200
28	25	13	Robby Gordon	Team Menard	Ford	193	0	running	79	$23,840
29	14	1	Steve Park	Dale Earnhardt, Inc.	Chevrolet	193	0	running	76	$34,905
30	29	14	Rick Mast	A. J. Foyt Enterprises	Pontiac	192	0	running	73	$35,240
31	34	55	Kenny Wallace	Andy Petree Racing	Chevrolet	192	0	running	70	$23,510
32	38	97	Chad Little	Roush Racing	Ford	192	0	running	67	$34,440
33	43	90	Ed Berrier (R)	Donlavey Racing	Ford	192	0	running	64	$23,335
34	24	75	Wally Dallenbach Jr.	Galaxy Motorsports	Ford	192	0	running	61	$26,285
35	18	42	Kenny Irwin Jr.	Team SABCO	Chevrolet	191	0	running	58	$33,695
36	42	11	Brett Bodine	Brett Bodine Racing	Ford	191	0	running	55	$23,150
37	27	27	Mike Bliss (R)	Eel River Racing	Pontiac	191	0	running	52	$23,090
38	36	60	Geoff Bodine	Joe Bessey Racing	Chevrolet	190	0	crash	49	$30,990
39	35	44	Kyle Petty	Petty Enterprises	Pontiac	187	0	engine	46	$30,955
40	19	6	Mark Martin	Roush Racing	Ford	183	0	running	43	$40,920
41	22	12	Jeremy Mayfield	Penske-Kranefuss Racing	Ford	176	85	engine	50	$40,885
42	33	9	Stacy Compton (R)	Melling Racing	Ford	143	0	running	37	$22,850
43	41	4	Bobby Hamilton	Morgan–McClure Motorsports	Chevrolet	16	0	crash	34	$30,815
Official race results

== Media ==
=== Television ===
The Kmart 400 was covered by CBS in the United States for the fourth straight year and it was their final Kmart 400 race as coverage would switch to Fox in 2001. Mike Joy, two-time NASCAR Cup Series champion Ned Jarrett and 1979 race winner Buddy Baker called the race from the broadcast booth. Dick Berggren, Ralph Sheheen and Bill Stephens handled pit road for the television side. Ken Squier would serve as host. Due to the rain delay, coverage switched from CBS to TNN.

CBS / TNN
Host	Booth announcers		Pit reporters
Host	Lap-by-lap	Color-commentators	Pit reporters
Ken Squier	Mike Joy	Ned Jarrett; Buddy Baker	Dick Berggren; Ralph Sheheen; Bill Stephens

== Standings after the race ==
Drivers' Championship standings

	Pos	Driver	Points
	1	Bobby Labonte	2,116
1	2	Dale Earnhardt	2,018 (−98)
1	3	Ward Burton	2,014 (−102)
	4	Dale Jarrett	1,955 (−161)
1	5	Jeff Burton	1,868 (−248)
1	6	Rusty Wallace	1,855 (−261)
2	7	Tony Stewart	1,821 (−295)
	8	Ricky Rudd	1,810 (−306)
3	9	Mark Martin	1,798 (−318)
	10	Jeff Gordon	1,732 (−384)
Official driver's standings

- Note: Only the first 10 positions are included for the driver standings.

Previous race: 2000 MBNA Platinum 400	NASCAR Winston Cup Series; 2000 season	Next race: 2000 Pocono 500
