= 2000 MBNA Platinum 400 =

13th race of the 2000 NASCAR Winston Cup Series

Race details
- Race 13 of 34 in the 2000 NASCAR Winston Cup Series
- The 2000 MBNA Platinum 400 program cover.
- Date: June 4, 2000
- Official name: 32nd Annual MBNA Platinum 400
- Location: Dover, Delaware, Dover International Speedway
- Course: Permanent racing facility
- Course length: 1 miles (1.6 km)
- Distance: 400 laps, 400 mi (643.737 km)
- Scheduled distance: 400 laps, 400 mi (643.737 km)
- Average speed: 109.514 miles per hour (176.246 km/h)

Pole position
Driver	Rusty Wallace	Penske-Kranefuss Racing
- Time: 22.870

Most laps led
Driver	Tony Stewart	Joe Gibbs Racing
- Laps: 242

Winner
No. 20	Tony Stewart	Joe Gibbs Racing

Television in the United States
- Network: TNN
- Announcers: Eli Gold, Dick Berggren, Buddy Baker

Radio in the United States
- Radio: Motor Racing Network

The 2000 MBNA Platinum 400 was the 13th stock car race of the 2000 NASCAR Winston Cup Series and the 32nd iteration of the event. The race was held on Sunday, June 4, 2000, in Dover, Delaware at Dover International Speedway, a 1-mile (1.6 km) permanent oval-shaped racetrack. The race took the scheduled 400 laps to complete. At race's end, Tony Stewart, driving for Joe Gibbs Racing, would complete a dominant performance on the final restart with six to go to win his fourth career NASCAR Winston Cup Series win and his first of the season. To fill out the podium, Matt Kenseth of Roush Racing and Bobby Labonte of Joe Gibbs Racing would finish second and third, respectively.

== Background ==
The layout of Dover International Speedway, the venue where the race was held.

Dover International Speedway is an oval race track in Dover, Delaware, United States that has held at least two NASCAR races since it opened in 1969. In addition to NASCAR, the track also hosted USAC and the NTT IndyCar Series. The track features one layout, a 1-mile (1.6 km) concrete oval, with 24° banking in the turns and 9° banking on the straights. The speedway is owned and operated by Dover Motorsports.

The track, nicknamed "The Monster Mile", was built in 1969 by Melvin Joseph of Melvin L. Joseph Construction Company, Inc., with an asphalt surface, but was replaced with concrete in 1995. Six years later in 2001, the track's capacity moved to 135,000 seats, making the track have the largest capacity of sports venue in the mid-Atlantic. In 2002, the name changed to Dover International Speedway from Dover Downs International Speedway after Dover Downs Gaming and Entertainment split, making Dover Motorsports. From 2007 to 2009, the speedway worked on an improvement project called "The Monster Makeover", which expanded facilities at the track and beautified the track. After the 2014 season, the track's capacity was reduced to 95,500 seats.

=== Entry list ===
- (R) denotes rookie driver.

#	Driver	Team	Make
1	Steve Park	Dale Earnhardt, Inc.	Chevrolet
2	Rusty Wallace	Penske-Kranefuss Racing	Ford
3	Dale Earnhardt	Richard Childress Racing	Chevrolet
4	Bobby Hamilton	Morgan–McClure Motorsports	Chevrolet
5	Terry Labonte	Hendrick Motorsports	Chevrolet
6	Mark Martin	Roush Racing	Ford
7	Michael Waltrip	Mattei Motorsports	Chevrolet
8	Dale Earnhardt Jr. (R)	Dale Earnhardt, Inc.	Chevrolet
9	Stacy Compton (R)	Melling Racing	Ford
10	Johnny Benson Jr.	Tyler Jet Motorsports	Pontiac
11	Brett Bodine	Brett Bodine Racing	Ford
12	Jeremy Mayfield	Penske-Kranefuss Racing	Ford
14	Rick Mast	A. J. Foyt Enterprises	Pontiac
16	Kevin Lepage	Roush Racing	Ford
17	Matt Kenseth (R)	Roush Racing	Ford
18	Bobby Labonte	Joe Gibbs Racing	Pontiac
20	Tony Stewart	Joe Gibbs Racing	Pontiac
21	Elliott Sadler	Wood Brothers Racing	Ford
22	Ward Burton	Bill Davis Racing	Pontiac
24	Jeff Gordon	Hendrick Motorsports	Chevrolet
25	Jerry Nadeau	Hendrick Motorsports	Chevrolet
26	Jimmy Spencer	Haas-Carter Motorsports	Ford
27	Mike Bliss (R)	Eel River Racing	Pontiac
28	Ricky Rudd	Robert Yates Racing	Ford
31	Mike Skinner	Richard Childress Racing	Chevrolet
32	Scott Pruett (R)	PPI Motorsports	Ford
33	Joe Nemechek	Andy Petree Racing	Chevrolet
36	Ken Schrader	MB2 Motorsports	Pontiac
40	Sterling Marlin	Team SABCO	Chevrolet
42	Kenny Irwin Jr.	Team SABCO	Chevrolet
43	John Andretti*	Petty Enterprises	Pontiac
44	Kyle Petty	Petty Enterprises	Pontiac
55	Kenny Wallace	Andy Petree Racing	Chevrolet
60	Geoff Bodine	Joe Bessey Racing	Chevrolet
66	Darrell Waltrip	Haas-Carter Motorsports	Ford
71	Dave Marcis	Marcis Auto Racing	Chevrolet
75	Wally Dallenbach Jr.	Galaxy Motorsports	Ford
77	Robert Pressley	Jasper Motorsports	Ford
85	Carl Long	Mansion Motorsports	Ford
88	Dale Jarrett	Robert Yates Racing	Ford
90	Ed Berrier (R)	Donlavey Racing	Ford
93	Dave Blaney (R)	Bill Davis Racing	Pontiac
94	Bill Elliott	Bill Elliott Racing	Ford
97	Chad Little	Roush Racing	Ford
99	Jeff Burton	Roush Racing	Ford
Official entry list

*During the race, Kyle Petty would replace Andretti due to Andretti's rib injuries sustained at the 2000 The Winston.

== Practice ==
=== First practice ===
The first practice session was held on Friday, June 2, at 11:30 AM EST, and would last for one hour and 30 minutes. Jeremy Mayfield of Penske-Kranefuss Racing would set the fastest time in the session, with a lap of 22.749 and an average speed of 158.248 mph (254.675 km/h).

Pos.	#	Driver	Team	Make	Time	Speed
1	12	Jeremy Mayfield	Penske-Kranefuss Racing	Ford	22.749	158.248
2	33	Joe Nemechek	Andy Petree Racing	Chevrolet	22.953	156.842
3	6	Mark Martin	Roush Racing	Ford	22.954	156.835
Full first practice results

=== Second practice ===
The second practice session was held on Friday, June 2, at 1:20 PM EST, and would last for 40 minutes. Joe Nemechek of Andy Petree Racing would set the fastest time in the session, with a lap of 22.796 and an average speed of 157.922 mph (254.151 km/h).

Pos.	#	Driver	Team	Make	Time	Speed
1	33	Joe Nemechek	Andy Petree Racing	Chevrolet	22.796	157.922
2	2	Rusty Wallace	Penske-Kranefuss Racing	Ford	22.870	157.411
3	6	Mark Martin	Roush Racing	Ford	22.896	157.232
Full second practice results

=== Third practice ===
The third practice session was held on Saturday, June 3, at 9:30 AM EST, and would last for one hour and 15 minutes. Scott Pruett of PPI Motorsports would set the fastest time in the session, with a lap of 22.992 and an average speed of 156.576 mph (251.985 km/h).

Pos.	#	Driver	Team	Make	Time	Speed
1	32	Scott Pruett (R)	PPI Motorsports	Ford	22.992	156.576
2	93	Dave Blaney (R)	Bill Davis Racing	Pontiac	23.004	156.494
3	90	Ed Berrier (R)	Donlavey Racing	Ford	23.009	156.460
Full third practice results

=== Fourth and final practice ===
The fourth and final practice session, sometimes referred to as Happy Hour, was held on Saturday, June 3, after the preliminary 2000 MBNA Platinum 200 Busch Series race, and lasted for up to an hour. Joe Nemechek of Andy Petree Racing would set the fastest time in the session, with a lap of 23.386 and an average speed of 153.938 mph (247.739 km/h).

Pos.	#	Driver	Team	Make	Time	Speed
1	33	Joe Nemechek	Andy Petree Racing	Chevrolet	23.386	153.938
2	5	Terry Labonte	Hendrick Motorsports	Chevrolet	23.441	153.577
3	25	Jerry Nadeau	Hendrick Motorsports	Chevrolet	23.536	152.957
Full Happy Hour practice results

== Qualifying ==
Qualifying was split into two rounds. The first round was held on Friday, June 2, at 3:30 PM EST. Each driver would have two laps to set a fastest time; the fastest of the two would count as their official qualifying lap. During the first round, the top 25 drivers in the round would be guaranteed a starting spot in the race. If a driver was not able to guarantee a spot in the first round, they had the option to scrub their time from the first round and try and run a faster lap time in a second round qualifying run, held on Saturday, June 3, at 11:30 AM EST. As with the first round, each driver would have two laps to set a fastest time; the fastest of the two would count as their official qualifying lap. Positions 26-36 would be decided on time, while positions 37-43 would be based on provisionals. Six spots are awarded by the use of provisionals based on owner's points. The seventh is awarded to a past champion who has not otherwise qualified for the race. If no past champion needs the provisional, the next team in the owner points will be awarded a provisional.

Rusty Wallace of Penske-Kranefuss Racing would win the pole, setting a time of 22.870 and an average speed of 157.411 miles per hour (253.328 km/h).

Two drivers would fail to qualify: Kyle Petty and Carl Long.

=== Full qualifying results ===
Pos.	#	Driver	Team	Make	Time	Speed
1	2	Rusty Wallace	Penske-Kranefuss Racing	Ford	22.870	157.411
2	94	Bill Elliott	Bill Elliott Racing	Ford	22.880	157.343
3	55	Kenny Wallace	Andy Petree Racing	Chevrolet	22.907	157.157
4	6	Mark Martin	Roush Racing	Ford	22.909	157.143
5	12	Jeremy Mayfield	Penske-Kranefuss Racing	Ford	22.934	156.972
6	8	Dale Earnhardt Jr. (R)	Dale Earnhardt, Inc.	Chevrolet	22.953	156.842
7	28	Ricky Rudd	Robert Yates Racing	Ford	22.960	156.794
8	31	Mike Skinner	Richard Childress Racing	Chevrolet	22.964	156.767
9	18	Bobby Labonte	Joe Gibbs Racing	Pontiac	22.965	156.760
10	33	Joe Nemechek	Andy Petree Racing	Chevrolet	22.972	156.713
11	42	Kenny Irwin Jr.	Team SABCO	Chevrolet	22.980	156.658
12	75	Wally Dallenbach Jr.	Galaxy Motorsports	Ford	22.982	156.644
13	11	Brett Bodine	Brett Bodine Racing	Ford	22.997	156.542
14	99	Jeff Burton	Roush Racing	Ford	23.022	156.372
15	7	Michael Waltrip	Mattei Motorsports	Chevrolet	23.059	156.121
16	20	Tony Stewart	Joe Gibbs Racing	Pontiac	23.060	156.114
17	1	Steve Park	Dale Earnhardt, Inc.	Chevrolet	23.064	156.087
18	88	Dale Jarrett	Robert Yates Racing	Ford	23.084	155.952
19	24	Jeff Gordon	Hendrick Motorsports	Chevrolet	23.095	155.878
20	16	Kevin Lepage	Roush Racing	Ford	23.097	155.864
21	9	Stacy Compton (R)	Melling Racing	Ford	23.103	155.824
22	60	Geoff Bodine	Joe Bessey Racing	Chevrolet	23.106	155.804
23	22	Ward Burton	Bill Davis Racing	Pontiac	23.108	155.790
24	77	Robert Pressley	Jasper Motorsports	Ford	23.136	155.602
25	40	Sterling Marlin	Team SABCO	Chevrolet	23.139	155.581
26	17	Matt Kenseth (R)	Roush Racing	Ford	23.052	156.169
27	93	Dave Blaney (R)	Bill Davis Racing	Pontiac	23.074	156.020
28	14	Rick Mast	A. J. Foyt Enterprises	Pontiac	23.078	155.993
29	32	Scott Pruett (R)	PPI Motorsports	Ford	23.080	155.979
30	3	Dale Earnhardt	Richard Childress Racing	Chevrolet	23.107	155.797
31	36	Ken Schrader	MB2 Motorsports	Pontiac	23.158	155.454
32	21	Elliott Sadler	Wood Brothers Racing	Ford	23.159	155.447
33	43	John Andretti	Petty Enterprises	Pontiac	23.160	155.440
34	10	Johnny Benson Jr.	Tyler Jet Motorsports	Pontiac	23.181	155.300
35	66	Darrell Waltrip	Haas-Carter Motorsports	Ford	23.183	155.286
36	25	Jerry Nadeau	Hendrick Motorsports	Chevrolet	23.191	155.233
Provisionals
37	5	Terry Labonte	Hendrick Motorsports	Chevrolet	-	-
38	97	Chad Little	Roush Racing	Ford	-	-
39	26	Jimmy Spencer	Haas-Carter Motorsports	Ford	-	-
40	4	Bobby Hamilton	Morgan–McClure Motorsports	Chevrolet	-	-
41	27	Mike Bliss (R)	Eel River Racing	Pontiac	-	-
42	90	Ed Berrier (R)	Donlavey Racing	Ford	-	-
43	71	Dave Marcis	Marcis Auto Racing	Chevrolet	-	-
Failed to qualify
44	44	Kyle Petty	Petty Enterprises	Pontiac	23.287	154.593
45	85	Carl Long	Mansion Motorsports	Ford	-	-
Official first-round results
Official qualifying results

== Race results ==
Fin	St	#	Driver	Team	Make	Laps	Led	Status	Pts	Winnings
1	16	20	Tony Stewart	Joe Gibbs Racing	Pontiac	400	242	running	185	$152,850
2	26	17	Matt Kenseth (R)	Roush Racing	Ford	400	0	running	170	$119,755
3	9	18	Bobby Labonte	Joe Gibbs Racing	Pontiac	400	2	running	170	$96,105
4	18	88	Dale Jarrett	Robert Yates Racing	Ford	400	0	running	160	$95,755
5	7	28	Ricky Rudd	Robert Yates Racing	Ford	400	0	running	155	$78,280
6	30	3	Dale Earnhardt	Richard Childress Racing	Chevrolet	399	49	running	155	$75,455
7	10	33	Joe Nemechek	Andy Petree Racing	Chevrolet	398	0	running	146	$71,885
8	23	22	Ward Burton	Bill Davis Racing	Pontiac	398	0	running	142	$74,685
9	8	31	Mike Skinner	Richard Childress Racing	Chevrolet	398	43	running	143	$63,085
10	6	8	Dale Earnhardt Jr. (R)	Dale Earnhardt, Inc.	Chevrolet	398	2	running	139	$54,785
11	37	5	Terry Labonte	Hendrick Motorsports	Chevrolet	398	0	running	130	$73,160
12	2	94	Bill Elliott	Bill Elliott Racing	Ford	398	0	running	127	$59,910
13	33	43	John Andretti	Petty Enterprises	Pontiac	398	1	running	129	$65,970
14	1	2	Rusty Wallace	Penske-Kranefuss Racing	Ford	398	9	running	126	$70,360
15	34	10	Johnny Benson Jr.	Tyler Jet Motorsports	Pontiac	397	0	running	118	$53,280
16	32	21	Elliott Sadler	Wood Brothers Racing	Ford	397	1	running	120	$58,460
17	11	42	Kenny Irwin Jr.	Team SABCO	Chevrolet	397	0	running	112	$57,975
18	3	55	Kenny Wallace	Andy Petree Racing	Chevrolet	396	0	running	109	$57,260
19	17	1	Steve Park	Dale Earnhardt, Inc.	Chevrolet	396	0	running	106	$56,835
20	38	97	Chad Little	Roush Racing	Ford	396	0	running	103	$60,985
21	20	16	Kevin Lepage	Roush Racing	Ford	396	0	running	100	$56,335
22	39	26	Jimmy Spencer	Haas-Carter Motorsports	Ford	396	0	running	97	$56,085
23	31	36	Ken Schrader	MB2 Motorsports	Pontiac	396	0	running	94	$47,835
24	12	75	Wally Dallenbach Jr.	Galaxy Motorsports	Ford	395	0	running	91	$47,580
25	27	93	Dave Blaney (R)	Bill Davis Racing	Pontiac	394	0	running	88	$44,305
26	24	77	Robert Pressley	Jasper Motorsports	Ford	393	0	running	85	$47,555
27	40	4	Bobby Hamilton	Morgan–McClure Motorsports	Chevrolet	393	0	running	82	$43,830
28	13	11	Brett Bodine	Brett Bodine Racing	Ford	392	0	running	79	$43,680
29	43	71	Dave Marcis	Marcis Auto Racing	Chevrolet	391	0	running	76	$43,680
30	21	9	Stacy Compton (R)	Melling Racing	Ford	389	0	running	73	$46,030
31	25	40	Sterling Marlin	Team SABCO	Chevrolet	387	0	running	70	$51,880
32	19	24	Jeff Gordon	Hendrick Motorsports	Chevrolet	380	0	running	67	$63,420
33	35	66	Darrell Waltrip	Haas-Carter Motorsports	Ford	374	0	running	64	$43,070
34	14	99	Jeff Burton	Roush Racing	Ford	370	0	running	61	$62,920
35	41	27	Mike Bliss (R)	Eel River Racing	Pontiac	279	0	crash	58	$42,770
36	4	6	Mark Martin	Roush Racing	Ford	268	2	engine	60	$60,655
37	5	12	Jeremy Mayfield	Penske-Kranefuss Racing	Ford	212	49	engine	57	$50,545
38	29	32	Scott Pruett (R)	PPI Motorsports	Ford	206	0	crash	49	$42,435
39	15	7	Michael Waltrip	Mattei Motorsports	Chevrolet	185	0	engine	46	$50,325
40	22	60	Geoff Bodine	Joe Bessey Racing	Chevrolet	145	0	crash	43	$50,190
41	42	90	Ed Berrier (R)	Donlavey Racing	Ford	84	0	crash	40	$42,330
42	36	25	Jerry Nadeau	Hendrick Motorsports	Chevrolet	34	0	crash	37	$49,970
43	28	14	Rick Mast	A. J. Foyt Enterprises	Pontiac	3	0	crash	34	$42,360
Official race results

== Standings after the race ==
Drivers' Championship standings

	Pos	Driver	Points
	1	Bobby Labonte	1,946
	2	Ward Burton	1,864 (−82)
1	3	Dale Earnhardt	1,848 (−98)
2	4	Dale Jarrett	1,790 (−156)
2	5	Mark Martin	1,755 (−191)
1	6	Jeff Burton	1,733 (−213)
	7	Rusty Wallace	1,704 (−242)
1	8	Ricky Rudd	1,678 (−268)
1	9	Tony Stewart	1,641 (−305)
2	10	Jeff Gordon	1,606 (−340)
Official driver's standings

- Note: Only the first 10 positions are included for the driver standings.

Previous race: 2000 Coca-Cola 600	NASCAR Winston Cup Series; 2000 season	Next race: 2000 Kmart 400
