= 2001 Checker Auto Parts 500 =

32nd race of the 2001 NASCAR Winston Cup Series

2001 Checker Auto Parts 500 presented by Pennzoil
Race details
- Race 32 of 36 in the 2001 NASCAR Winston Cup Series
- The 2001 Checker Auto Parts 500 program cover.
- Date: October 28, 2001
- Official name: 14th Annual Checker Auto Parts 500 presented by Pennzoil
- Location: Avondale, Arizona, Phoenix International Raceway
- Course: Permanent racing facility
- Course length: 1 miles (1.6 km)
- Distance: 312 laps, 312 mi (502.115 km)
- Average speed: 102.613 miles per hour (165.140 km/h)

Pole position
Driver	Casey Atwood	Evernham Motorsports
- Time: 27.419

Most laps led
Driver	Jeff Burton	Roush Racing
- Laps: 102

Winner
No. 99	Jeff Burton	Roush Racing

Television in the United States
- Network: NBC
- Announcers: Allen Bestwick, Benny Parsons, Wally Dallenbach Jr.

Radio in the United States
- Radio: Motor Racing Network

The 2001 Checker Auto Parts 500 presented by Pennzoil was the 32nd stock car race of the 2001 NASCAR Winston Cup Series and the 14th iteration of the event. The race was held on Sunday, October 28, 2001, in Avondale, Arizona at Phoenix International Raceway, a 1-mile (1.6 km) permanent low-banked tri-oval race track. The race took the scheduled 312 laps to complete. At race's end, Jeff Burton, driving for Roush Racing, would prevail in a battle against reliever for Jeremy Mayfield, Penske Racing South driver Mike Wallace, to win his 17th career NASCAR Winston Cup Series victory and his second and final victory of the season. To fill out the podium, Wallace and Robert Yates Racing driver Ricky Rudd would finish second and third, respectively.

== Background ==
The layout of Phoenix International Raceway, the venue where the race was held.

Phoenix International Raceway – also known as PIR – is a one-mile, low-banked tri-oval race track located in Avondale, Arizona. It is named after the nearby metropolitan area of Phoenix. The motorsport track opened in 1964 and currently hosts two NASCAR race weekends annually. PIR has also hosted the IndyCar Series, CART, USAC and the Rolex Sports Car Series. The raceway is currently owned and operated by International Speedway Corporation.

The raceway was originally constructed with a 2.5 mi (4.0 km) road course that ran both inside and outside of the main tri-oval. In 1991 the track was reconfigured with the current 1.51 mi (2.43 km) interior layout. PIR has an estimated grandstand seating capacity of around 67,000. Lights were installed around the track in 2004 following the addition of a second annual NASCAR race weekend.

=== Entry list ===
- (R) denotes rookie driver.

#	Driver	Team	Make
1	Kenny Wallace	Dale Earnhardt, Inc.	Chevrolet
01	Jason Leffler (R)	Chip Ganassi Racing with Felix Sabates	Dodge
2	Rusty Wallace	Penske Racing South	Ford
02	Ryan Newman	Penske Racing South	Ford
4	Bobby Hamilton Jr.	Morgan–McClure Motorsports	Chevrolet
5	Terry Labonte	Hendrick Motorsports	Chevrolet
6	Mark Martin	Roush Racing	Ford
7	Kevin Lepage	Ultra Motorsports	Ford
8	Dale Earnhardt Jr.	Dale Earnhardt, Inc.	Chevrolet
9	Bill Elliott	Evernham Motorsports	Dodge
10	Johnny Benson Jr.	MBV Motorsports	Pontiac
11	Brett Bodine	Brett Bodine Racing	Ford
12	Mike Wallace	Penske Racing South	Ford
14	Ron Hornaday Jr. (R)	A. J. Foyt Enterprises	Pontiac
15	Michael Waltrip	Dale Earnhardt, Inc.	Chevrolet
17	Matt Kenseth	Roush Racing	Ford
18	Bobby Labonte	Joe Gibbs Racing	Pontiac
19	Casey Atwood (R)	Evernham Motorsports	Dodge
20	Tony Stewart	Joe Gibbs Racing	Pontiac
21	Elliott Sadler	Wood Brothers Racing	Ford
22	Ward Burton	Bill Davis Racing	Dodge
24	Jeff Gordon	Hendrick Motorsports	Chevrolet
25	Jerry Nadeau	Hendrick Motorsports	Chevrolet
26	Jimmy Spencer	Haas-Carter Motorsports	Ford
28	Ricky Rudd	Robert Yates Racing	Ford
29	Kevin Harvick (R)	Richard Childress Racing	Chevrolet
31	Robby Gordon	Richard Childress Racing	Chevrolet
32	Ricky Craven	PPI Motorsports	Ford
33	Joe Nemechek	Andy Petree Racing	Chevrolet
36	Ken Schrader	MBV Motorsports	Pontiac
40	Sterling Marlin	Chip Ganassi Racing with Felix Sabates	Dodge
43	John Andretti	Petty Enterprises	Dodge
44	Buckshot Jones	Petty Enterprises	Dodge
45	Kyle Petty	Petty Enterprises	Dodge
55	Bobby Hamilton	Andy Petree Racing	Chevrolet
66	Todd Bodine	Haas-Carter Motorsports	Ford
70	Rick Bogart	Bogart Racing	Dodge
77	Robert Pressley	Jasper Motorsports	Ford
88	Dale Jarrett	Robert Yates Racing	Ford
90	Hut Stricklin	Donlavey Racing	Ford
92	Stacy Compton	Melling Racing	Dodge
93	Dave Blaney	Bill Davis Racing	Dodge
97	Kurt Busch (R)	Roush Racing	Ford
99	Jeff Burton	Roush Racing	Ford
Official entry list

== Practice ==
=== First practice ===
The first practice session was held on Friday, October 26, at 10:25 AM MST. The session would last for one hour and 55 minutes. Kyle Petty, driving for Petty Enterprises, would set the fastest time in the session, with a lap of 27.467 and an average speed of 131.066 miles per hour (210.930 km/h).

Pos.	#	Driver	Team	Make	Time	Speed
1	45	Kyle Petty	Petty Enterprises	Dodge	27.467	131.066
2	10	Johnny Benson Jr.	MBV Motorsports	Pontiac	27.476	131.023
3	19	Casey Atwood (R)	Evernham Motorsports	Dodge	27.490	130.957
Full first practice results

=== Second practice ===
The second session was held on Saturday, October 27, at 10:30 AM MST. The session would last for 45 minutes. Jeff Burton, driving for Roush Racing, would set the fastest time in the session, with a lap of 28.195 and an average speed of 127.682 miles per hour (205.484 km/h).

Pos.	#	Driver	Team	Make	Time	Speed
1	99	Jeff Burton	Roush Racing	Ford	28.195	127.682
2	45	Kyle Petty	Petty Enterprises	Dodge	28.255	127.411
3	55	Bobby Hamilton	Andy Petree Racing	Chevrolet	28.262	127.380
Full second practice results

=== Third and final practice ===
The final practice session, sometimes referred to as Happy Hour, was held on Saturday, October 27, at 3:30 PM EST. The session would last for one hour. Jeff Gordon, driving for Hendrick Motorsports, would set the fastest time in the session, with a lap of 28.325 and an average speed of 127.096 miles per hour (204.541 km/h).

Pos.	#	Driver	Team	Make	Time	Speed
1	24	Jeff Gordon	Hendrick Motorsports	Chevrolet	28.325	127.096
2	29	Kevin Harvick (R)	Richard Childress Racing	Chevrolet	28.447	126.551
3	20	Tony Stewart	Joe Gibbs Racing	Pontiac	28.457	126.507
Full Happy Hour practice results

== Qualifying ==
Qualifying was held on Friday, October 26, at 2:40 PM MST. Each driver would have two laps to set a fastest time; the fastest of the two would count as their official qualifying lap. Positions 1-36 would be decided on time, while positions 37-43 would be based on provisionals. Six spots are awarded by the use of provisionals based on owner's points. The seventh is awarded to a past champion who has not otherwise qualified for the race. If no past champ needs the provisional, the next team in the owner points will be awarded a provisional.

Casey Atwood, driving for Evernham Motorsports, would win the pole, setting a time of 27.419 and an average speed of 131.296 miles per hour (211.300 km/h).

Rick Bogart was the only driver to fail to qualify.

=== Full qualifying results ===
Pos.	#	Driver	Team	Make	Time	Speed
1	19	Casey Atwood (R)	Evernham Motorsports	Dodge	27.419	131.296
2	43	John Andretti	Petty Enterprises	Dodge	27.466	131.071
3	99	Jeff Burton	Roush Racing	Ford	27.486	130.976
4	2	Rusty Wallace	Penske Racing South	Ford	27.495	130.933
5	77	Robert Pressley	Jasper Motorsports	Ford	27.522	130.804
6	9	Bill Elliott	Evernham Motorsports	Dodge	27.566	130.596
7	1	Kenny Wallace	Dale Earnhardt, Inc.	Chevrolet	27.590	130.482
8	14	Ron Hornaday Jr. (R)	A. J. Foyt Enterprises	Pontiac	27.604	130.416
9	32	Ricky Craven	PPI Motorsports	Ford	27.607	130.402
10	36	Ken Schrader	MB2 Motorsports	Pontiac	27.622	130.331
11	66	Todd Bodine	Haas-Carter Motorsports	Ford	27.623	130.326
12	11	Brett Bodine	Brett Bodine Racing	Ford	27.629	130.298
13	10	Johnny Benson Jr.	MBV Motorsports	Pontiac	27.636	130.265
14	24	Jeff Gordon	Hendrick Motorsports	Chevrolet	27.662	130.142
15	92	Stacy Compton	Melling Racing	Dodge	27.662	130.142
16	88	Dale Jarrett	Robert Yates Racing	Ford	27.692	130.001
17	55	Bobby Hamilton	Andy Petree Racing	Chevrolet	27.693	129.997
18	18	Bobby Labonte	Joe Gibbs Racing	Pontiac	27.700	129.964
19	44	Buckshot Jones	Petty Enterprises	Dodge	27.719	129.875
20	93	Dave Blaney	Bill Davis Racing	Dodge	27.729	129.828
21	28	Ricky Rudd	Robert Yates Racing	Ford	27.738	129.786
22	20	Tony Stewart	Joe Gibbs Racing	Pontiac	27.741	129.772
23	5	Terry Labonte	Hendrick Motorsports	Chevrolet	27.757	129.697
24	12	Mike Wallace	Penske Racing South	Ford	27.768	129.646
25	02	Ryan Newman	Penske Racing South	Ford	27.774	129.618
26	15	Michael Waltrip	Dale Earnhardt, Inc.	Chevrolet	27.779	129.594
27	90	Rick Mast	Donlavey Racing	Ford	27.790	129.543
28	45	Kyle Petty	Petty Enterprises	Dodge	27.790	129.543
29	6	Mark Martin	Roush Racing	Ford	27.810	129.450
30	8	Dale Earnhardt Jr.	Dale Earnhardt, Inc.	Chevrolet	27.833	129.343
31	40	Sterling Marlin	Chip Ganassi Racing with Felix Sabates	Dodge	27.858	129.227
32	26	Jimmy Spencer	Haas-Carter Motorsports	Ford	27.875	129.148
33	22	Ward Burton	Bill Davis Racing	Dodge	27.893	129.065
34	33	Joe Nemechek	Andy Petree Racing	Chevrolet	27.915	128.963
35	7	Kevin Lepage	Ultra Motorsports	Ford	27.956	128.774
36	01	Jason Leffler (R)	Chip Ganassi Racing with Felix Sabates	Dodge	27.969	128.714
Provisionals
37	29	Kevin Harvick (R)	Richard Childress Racing	Chevrolet	-*	-*
38	17	Matt Kenseth	Roush Racing	Ford	-*	-*
39	21	Elliott Sadler	Wood Brothers Racing	Ford	-*	-*
40	25	Jerry Nadeau	Hendrick Motorsports	Chevrolet	-*	-*
41	97	Kurt Busch (R)	Roush Racing	Ford	-*	-*
42	31	Robby Gordon	Richard Childress Racing	Chevrolet	-*	-*
43	4	Bobby Hamilton Jr.	Morgan–McClure Motorsports	Chevrolet	-*	-*
Failed to qualify
44	70	Rick Bogart	Bogart Racing	Dodge	28.420	126.671
Official qualifying results

*Time not available.

== Race results ==
Fin	St	#	Driver	Team	Make	Laps	Led	Status	Pts	Winnings
1	3	99	Jeff Burton	Roush Racing	Ford	312	102	running	185	$213,491
2	24	12	Mike Wallace	Penske Racing South	Ford	312	45	running	175	$156,459
3	21	28	Ricky Rudd	Robert Yates Racing	Ford	312	0	running	165	$139,797
4	38	17	Matt Kenseth	Roush Racing	Ford	312	0	running	160	$97,960
5	22	20	Tony Stewart	Joe Gibbs Racing	Pontiac	312	0	running	155	$96,675
6	14	24	Jeff Gordon	Hendrick Motorsports	Chevrolet	312	0	running	150	$109,052
7	42	31	Robby Gordon	Richard Childress Racing	Chevrolet	312	0	running	146	$94,399
8	9	32	Ricky Craven	PPI Motorsports	Ford	312	0	running	142	$56,875
9	16	88	Dale Jarrett	Robert Yates Racing	Ford	312	0	running	138	$96,452
10	13	10	Johnny Benson Jr.	MBV Motorsports	Pontiac	312	0	running	134	$67,675
11	7	1	Kenny Wallace	Dale Earnhardt, Inc.	Chevrolet	312	0	running	130	$78,118
12	18	18	Bobby Labonte	Joe Gibbs Racing	Pontiac	312	0	running	127	$97,802
13	33	22	Ward Burton	Bill Davis Racing	Dodge	312	0	running	124	$81,610
14	1	19	Casey Atwood (R)	Evernham Motorsports	Dodge	312	71	running	126	$53,075
39	2	43	John Andretti	Petty Enterprises	Dodge	270	2	crash	51	$97,590
15	4	2	Rusty Wallace	Penske Racing South	Ford	312	91	running	123	$63,610
16	19	44	Buckshot Jones	Petty Enterprises	Dodge	312	0	running	115	$88,277
17	37	29	Kevin Harvick (R)	Richard Childress Racing	Chevrolet	312	0	running	112	$60,645
18	10	36	Ken Schrader	MB2 Motorsports	Pontiac	312	0	running	109	$85,176
19	29	6	Mark Martin	Roush Racing	Ford	312	0	running	106	$80,330
20	23	5	Terry Labonte	Hendrick Motorsports	Chevrolet	312	0	running	103	$50,936
21	15	92	Stacy Compton	Melling Racing	Dodge	312	0	running	100	$52,850
22	41	97	Kurt Busch (R)	Roush Racing	Ford	312	0	running	97	$50,325
23	26	15	Michael Waltrip	Dale Earnhardt, Inc.	Chevrolet	312	0	running	94	$51,375
24	40	25	Jerry Nadeau	Hendrick Motorsports	Chevrolet	312	0	running	91	$40,950
25	27	90	Rick Mast	Donlavey Racing	Ford	312	0	running	88	$47,615
26	12	11	Brett Bodine	Brett Bodine Racing	Ford	312	0	running	85	$67,523
27	6	9	Bill Elliott	Evernham Motorsports	Dodge	312	0	running	82	$42,675
28	20	93	Dave Blaney	Bill Davis Racing	Dodge	312	0	running	79	$42,050
29	11	66	Todd Bodine	Haas-Carter Motorsports	Ford	311	0	running	76	$39,925
30	8	14	Ron Hornaday Jr. (R)	A. J. Foyt Enterprises	Pontiac	311	0	running	73	$50,375
31	32	26	Jimmy Spencer	Haas-Carter Motorsports	Ford	311	1	running	75	$47,150
32	35	7	Kevin Lepage	Ultra Motorsports	Ford	310	0	running	67	$57,025
33	39	21	Elliott Sadler	Wood Brothers Racing	Ford	310	0	running	64	$46,900
34	31	40	Sterling Marlin	Chip Ganassi Racing with Felix Sabates	Dodge	309	0	running	61	$67,045
35	34	33	Joe Nemechek	Andy Petree Racing	Chevrolet	301	0	running	58	$46,650
36	17	55	Bobby Hamilton	Andy Petree Racing	Chevrolet	300	0	running	55	$73,248
37	30	8	Dale Earnhardt Jr.	Dale Earnhardt, Inc.	Chevrolet	287	0	engine	52	$38,400
38	43	4	Bobby Hamilton Jr.	Morgan–McClure Motorsports	Chevrolet	286	0	overheating	49	$73,802
40	25	02	Ryan Newman	Penske Racing South	Ford	253	0	crash	43	$38,125
41	36	01	Jason Leffler (R)	Chip Ganassi Racing with Felix Sabates	Dodge	252	0	overheating	40	$45,975
42	5	77	Robert Pressley	Jasper Motorsports	Ford	239	0	crash	37	$45,850
43	28	45	Kyle Petty	Petty Enterprises	Dodge	65	0	engine	34	$37,978
Failed to qualify
44		70	Rick Bogart	Bogart Racing	Dodge					
Official race results

Previous race: 2001 EA Sports 500	NASCAR Winston Cup Series; 2001 season	Next race: 2001 Pop Secret Microwave Popcorn 400
