= 2001 UAW-DaimlerChrysler 400 =

Third race of the 2001 NASCAR Winston Cup Series

Race details
- Race 3 of 36 in the 2001 NASCAR Winston Cup Series
- The 2001 UAW-DaimlerChrysler program cover.
- Date: March 4, 2001
- Official name: 4th Annual UAW-DaimlerChrysler 400
- Location: North Las Vegas, Nevada, Las Vegas Motor Speedway
- Course: Permanent racing facility
- Course length: 1.5 miles (2.41 km)
- Distance: 267 laps, 400.5 mi (644.542 km)
- Scheduled distance: 267 laps, 400.5 mi (644.542 km)
- Average speed: 135.546 miles per hour (218.140 km/h)

Pole position
Driver	Dale Jarrett	Robert Yates Racing
- Time: 31.376

Most laps led
Driver	Mark Martin	Roush Racing
- Laps: 54

Winner
No. 24	Jeff Gordon	Hendrick Motorsports

Television in the United States
- Network: Fox
- Announcers: Mike Joy, Larry McReynolds, Darrell Waltrip

Radio in the United States
- Radio: Motor Racing Network

The 2001 UAW-DaimlerChrysler 400 was the third stock car race of the 2001 NASCAR Winston Cup Series and the fourth iteration of the event. The race was held on Sunday, March 4, 2001, in North Las Vegas, Nevada at Las Vegas Motor Speedway, a 1.5 miles (2.4 km) permanent D-shaped oval racetrack. The race took the scheduled 267 laps to complete. At race's end, Jeff Gordon, driving for Hendrick Motorsports, would make a late-race comeback from the back to win his 53rd career NASCAR Winston Cup Series win and his first of the season. To fill out the podium, Dale Jarrett of Robert Yates Racing and Sterling Marlin of Chip Ganassi Racing with Felix Sabates would finish 2nd and 3rd, respectively.

== Background ==
The layout of Las Vegas Motor Speedway, the venue where the race was held.

Las Vegas Motor Speedway, located in Clark County, Nevada outside the Las Vegas city limits and about 15 miles northeast of the Las Vegas Strip, is a 1,200-acre (490 ha) complex of multiple tracks for motorsports racing. The complex is owned by Speedway Motorsports, which is headquartered in Charlotte, North Carolina.

=== Entry list ===
#	Driver	Team	Make
1	Steve Park	Dale Earnhardt, Inc.	Chevrolet
01	Jason Leffler	Chip Ganassi Racing with Felix Sabates	Dodge
2	Rusty Wallace	Penske Racing	Ford
02	Ryan Newman	Penske Racing	Ford
4	Robby Gordon	Morgan–McClure Motorsports	Chevrolet
5	Terry Labonte	Hendrick Motorsports	Chevrolet
6	Mark Martin	Roush Racing	Ford
7	Mike Wallace	Ultra Motorsports	Ford
8	Dale Earnhardt Jr.	Dale Earnhardt, Inc.	Chevrolet
9	Bill Elliott	Evernham Motorsports	Dodge
10	Johnny Benson Jr.	MBV Motorsports	Pontiac
11	Brett Bodine	Brett Bodine Racing	Ford
12	Jeremy Mayfield	Penske Racing	Ford
14	Ron Hornaday Jr.	A. J. Foyt Enterprises	Pontiac
15	Michael Waltrip	Dale Earnhardt, Inc.	Chevrolet
17	Matt Kenseth	Roush Racing	Ford
18	Bobby Labonte	Joe Gibbs Racing	Pontiac
19	Casey Atwood	Evernham Motorsports	Dodge
20	Tony Stewart	Joe Gibbs Racing	Pontiac
21	Elliott Sadler	Wood Brothers Racing	Ford
22	Ward Burton	Bill Davis Racing	Dodge
24	Jeff Gordon	Hendrick Motorsports	Chevrolet
25	Jerry Nadeau	Hendrick Motorsports	Chevrolet
26	Jimmy Spencer	Haas-Carter Motorsports	Ford
27	Kenny Wallace	Eel River Racing	Pontiac
28	Ricky Rudd	Robert Yates Racing	Ford
29	Kevin Harvick	Richard Childress Racing	Chevrolet
31	Mike Skinner	Richard Childress Racing	Chevrolet
32	Ricky Craven	PPI Motorsports	Ford
33	Joe Nemechek	Andy Petree Racing	Chevrolet
36	Ken Schrader	MBV Motorsports	Pontiac
40	Sterling Marlin	Chip Ganassi Racing with Felix Sabates	Dodge
43	John Andretti	Petty Enterprises	Dodge
44	Buckshot Jones	Petty Enterprises	Dodge
45	Kyle Petty	Petty Enterprises	Dodge
50	Rick Mast	Midwest Transit Racing	Chevrolet
55	Bobby Hamilton	Andy Petree Racing	Chevrolet
62	Brendan Gaughan	Bill McAnally Racing	Chevrolet
66	Todd Bodine	Haas-Carter Motorsports	Ford
77	Robert Pressley	Jasper Motorsports	Ford
88	Dale Jarrett	Robert Yates Racing	Ford
90	Hut Stricklin	Donlavey Racing	Ford
92	Stacy Compton	Melling Racing	Dodge
93	Dave Blaney	Bill Davis Racing	Dodge
96	Andy Houston	PPI Motorsports	Ford
97	Kurt Busch	Roush Racing	Ford
99	Jeff Burton	Roush Racing	Ford
Official entry list

== Practice ==
=== First practice ===
The first practice session was held on Friday, March 2, at 1:20 PM PST, and would last for one hour and 40 minutes. Michael Waltrip of Dale Earnhardt, Inc. would set the fastest time in the session, with a lap of 31.477 and an average speed of 171.554 mph (276.089 km/h).

Pos.	#	Driver	Team	Make	Time	Speed
1	15	Michael Waltrip	Dale Earnhardt, Inc.	Chevrolet	31.477	171.554
2	25	Jerry Nadeau	Hendrick Motorsports	Chevrolet	31.490	171.483
3	10	Johnny Benson Jr.	MBV Motorsports	Pontiac	31.501	171.423
Full first practice results

=== Final practice ===
The Final practice session was held on Saturday, March 3, at 1:45 PM PST, and would last for one hour and 30 minutes. Casey Atwood of Evernham Motorsports would set the fastest time in the session, with a lap of 32.706 and an average speed of 165.107 mph (265.714 km/h).

Pos.	#	Driver	Team	Make	Time	Speed
1	19	Casey Atwood	Evernham Motorsports	Dodge	32.706	165.107
2	40	Sterling Marlin	Chip Ganassi Racing with Felix Sabates	Dodge	32.765	164.810
3	93	Dave Blaney	Bill Davis Racing	Dodge	32.800	164.634
Full Final practice results

== Qualifying ==
Qualifying was held on Friday, March 2, at 2:15 PM EST. Each driver would have two laps to set a fastest time; the fastest of the two would count as their official qualifying lap. Positions 1-36 would be decided on time, while positions 37-43 would be based on provisionals. Six spots are awarded by the use of provisionals based on owner's points. The seventh is awarded to a past champion who has not otherwise qualified for the race. If no past champ needs the provisional, the next team in the owner points will be awarded a provisional.

Dale Jarrett of Robert Yates Racing would win the pole, setting a time of 31.376 and an average speed of 172.106 miles per hour (276.978 km/h).

Four drivers would fail to qualify: Kyle Petty, Brendan Gaughan, Andy Houston, and Rick Mast.

=== Full qualifying results ===
Pos.	#	Driver	Team	Make	Time	Speed
1	88	Dale Jarrett	Robert Yates Racing	Ford	31.376	172.106
2	10	Johnny Benson Jr.	MBV Motorsports	Pontiac	31.445	171.728
3	25	Jerry Nadeau	Hendrick Motorsports	Chevrolet	31.462	171.636
4	15	Michael Waltrip	Dale Earnhardt, Inc.	Chevrolet	31.468	171.603
5	20	Tony Stewart	Joe Gibbs Racing	Pontiac	31.481	171.532
6	66	Todd Bodine	Haas-Carter Motorsports	Ford	31.497	171.445
7	18	Bobby Labonte	Joe Gibbs Racing	Pontiac	31.521	171.314
8	40	Sterling Marlin	Chip Ganassi Racing with Felix Sabates	Dodge	31.549	171.162
9	97	Kurt Busch	Roush Racing	Ford	31.555	171.130
10	2	Rusty Wallace	Penske Racing	Ford	31.559	171.108
11	21	Elliott Sadler	Wood Brothers Racing	Ford	31.561	171.097
12	14	Ron Hornaday Jr.	A. J. Foyt Enterprises	Pontiac	31.574	171.027
13	22	Ward Burton	Bill Davis Racing	Dodge	31.580	170.994
14	12	Jeremy Mayfield	Penske Racing	Ford	31.603	170.870
15	6	Mark Martin	Roush Racing	Ford	31.617	170.794
16	9	Bill Elliott	Evernham Motorsports	Dodge	31.618	170.793
17	93	Dave Blaney	Bill Davis Racing	Dodge	31.635	170.697
18	19	Casey Atwood	Evernham Motorsports	Dodge	31.645	170.643
19	26	Jimmy Spencer	Haas-Carter Motorsports	Ford	31.646	170.638
20	29	Kevin Harvick	Richard Childress Racing	Chevrolet	31.647	170.632
21	1	Steve Park	Dale Earnhardt, Inc.	Chevrolet	31.677	170.471
22	17	Matt Kenseth	Roush Racing	Ford	31.668	170.519
23	33	Joe Nemechek	Andy Petree Racing	Chevrolet	31.712	170.283
24	24	Jeff Gordon	Hendrick Motorsports	Chevrolet	31.730	170.186
25	28	Ricky Rudd	Robert Yates Racing	Ford	31.734	170.164
26	92	Stacy Compton	Melling Racing	Dodge	31.740	170.132
27	77	Robert Pressley	Jasper Motorsports	Ford	31.743	170.116
28	99	Jeff Burton	Roush Racing	Ford	31.775	169.945
29	36	Ken Schrader	MBV Motorsports	Pontiac	31.788	169.875
30	01	Jason Leffler	Chip Ganassi Racing with Felix Sabates	Dodge	31.835	169.625
31	55	Bobby Hamilton	Andy Petree Racing	Chevrolet	31.850	169.545
32	8	Dale Earnhardt Jr.	Dale Earnhardt, Inc.	Chevrolet	31.871	169.433
33	5	Terry Labonte	Hendrick Motorsports	Chevrolet	31.893	169.316
34	27	Kenny Wallace	Eel River Racing	Pontiac	31.895	169.306
35	02	Ryan Newman	Penske Racing	Ford	31.901	169.274
36	90	Hut Stricklin	Donlavey Racing	Ford	31.907	169.242
Provisionals
37	31	Mike Skinner	Richard Childress Racing	Chevrolet	32.078	168.340
38	43	John Andretti	Petty Enterprises	Dodge	31.944	169.046
39	7	Mike Wallace	Ultra Motorsports	Ford	32.648	165.401
40	4	Robby Gordon	Morgan–McClure Motorsports	Chevrolet	32.546	165.919
41	11	Brett Bodine	Brett Bodine Racing	Ford	32.363	166.857
42	32	Ricky Craven	PPI Motorsports	Ford	31.967	168.924
43	44	Buckshot Jones	Petty Enterprises	Dodge	32.396	166.687
Failed to qualify
44	45	Kyle Petty	Petty Enterprises	Dodge	31.984	168.834
45	62	Brendan Gaughan	Bill McAnally Racing	Chevrolet	32.038	168.550
46	96	Andy Houston	PPI Motorsports	Ford	32.202	167.691
47	50	Rick Mast	Midwest Transit Racing	Chevrolet	32.252	167.431
Official qualifying results

== Race results ==
Fin	#	Driver	Team	Make	Laps	Led	Status	Pts	Winnings
1	24	Jeff Gordon	Hendrick Motorsports	Chevrolet	267	33	running	180	$1,369,600
2	88	Dale Jarrett	Robert Yates Racing	Ford	267	42	running	175	$257,977
3	40	Sterling Marlin	Chip Ganassi Racing with Felix Sabates	Dodge	267	34	running	170	$183,760
4	10	Johnny Benson Jr.	MBV Motorsports	Pontiac	267	5	running	165	$129,600
5	66	Todd Bodine	Haas-Carter Motorsports	Ford	267	44	running	160	$108,350
6	6	Mark Martin	Roush Racing	Ford	267	54	running	160	$138,051
7	1	Steve Park	Dale Earnhardt, Inc.	Chevrolet	267	0	running	146	$109,543
8	29	Kevin Harvick	Richard Childress Racing	Chevrolet	267	0	running	142	$122,927
9	14	Ron Hornaday Jr.	A. J. Foyt Enterprises	Pontiac	267	0	running	138	$77,000
10	26	Jimmy Spencer	Haas-Carter Motorsports	Ford	267	0	running	134	$95,895
11	97	Kurt Busch	Roush Racing	Ford	267	0	running	130	$80,575
12	20	Tony Stewart	Joe Gibbs Racing	Pontiac	267	4	running	132	$86,875
13	15	Michael Waltrip	Dale Earnhardt, Inc.	Chevrolet	267	0	running	124	$75,675
14	9	Bill Elliott	Evernham Motorsports	Dodge	267	11	running	126	$93,398
15	25	Jerry Nadeau	Hendrick Motorsports	Chevrolet	267	23	running	123	$78,075
16	77	Robert Pressley	Jasper Motorsports	Ford	266	0	running	115	$80,986
17	17	Matt Kenseth	Roush Racing	Ford	266	10	running	117	$73,275
18	31	Mike Skinner	Richard Childress Racing	Chevrolet	266	0	running	109	$96,499
19	28	Ricky Rudd	Robert Yates Racing	Ford	266	0	running	106	$93,372
20	21	Elliott Sadler	Wood Brothers Racing	Ford	266	2	running	108	$68,065
21	22	Ward Burton	Bill Davis Racing	Dodge	266	0	running	100	$95,410
22	5	Terry Labonte	Hendrick Motorsports	Chevrolet	266	0	running	97	$94,005
23	8	Dale Earnhardt Jr.	Dale Earnhardt, Inc.	Chevrolet	266	3	running	99	$90,398
24	19	Casey Atwood	Evernham Motorsports	Dodge	266	0	running	91	$54,675
25	36	Ken Schrader	MBV Motorsports	Pontiac	265	0	running	88	$68,650
26	93	Dave Blaney	Bill Davis Racing	Dodge	265	0	running	85	$55,675
27	92	Stacy Compton	Melling Racing	Dodge	264	0	running	82	$54,175
28	01	Jason Leffler	Chip Ganassi Racing with Felix Sabates	Dodge	264	0	running	79	$58,675
29	18	Bobby Labonte	Joe Gibbs Racing	Pontiac	263	2	running	81	$102,502
30	55	Bobby Hamilton	Andy Petree Racing	Chevrolet	263	0	running	73	$58,775
31	27	Kenny Wallace	Eel River Racing	Pontiac	260	0	running	70	$50,075
32	7	Mike Wallace	Ultra Motorsports	Ford	259	0	running	67	$57,875
33	02	Ryan Newman	Penske Racing	Ford	256	0	running	64	$49,675
34	4	Robby Gordon	Morgan–McClure Motorsports	Chevrolet	252	0	running	61	$48,475
35	33	Joe Nemechek	Andy Petree Racing	Chevrolet	230	0	running	58	$77,545
36	44	Buckshot Jones	Petty Enterprises	Dodge	221	0	engine	55	$57,075
37	43	John Andretti	Petty Enterprises	Dodge	193	0	running	52	$83,877
38	11	Brett Bodine	Brett Bodine Racing	Ford	188	0	running	49	$48,650
39	99	Jeff Burton	Roush Racing	Ford	187	0	running	46	$68,250
40	90	Hut Stricklin	Donlavey Racing	Ford	157	0	crash	43	$48,225
41	32	Ricky Craven	PPI Motorsports	Ford	78	0	engine	40	$48,025
42	12	Jeremy Mayfield	Penske Racing	Ford	53	0	crash	37	$87,109
43	2	Rusty Wallace	Penske Racing	Ford	8	0	crash	34	$92,765
Official race results

== Standings after the race ==
	Pos	Driver	Points
1	1	Sterling Marlin	468
5	2	Jeff Gordon	433 (–35)
	3	Michael Waltrip	415 (–53)
8	4	Dale Jarrett	411 (–57)
	5	Steve Park	401 (–67)
7	6	Johnny Benson Jr.	394 (–74)
1	7	Bill Elliott	380 (–88)
1	8	Robert Pressley	363 (–105)
7	9	Tony Stewart	347 (–121)
1	10	Elliott Sadler	347 (–121)

Previous race: 2001 Dura Lube 400	NASCAR Winston Cup Series; 2001 season	Next race: 2001 Cracker Barrel Old Country Store 500
