= 2001 New England 300 =

19th race of the 2001 NASCAR Winston Cup Series

Race details
- Race 19 of 36 in the 2001 NASCAR Winston Cup Series
- The 2001 New England 300 program cover.
- Date: July 22, 2001
- Official name: 9th Annual New England 300
- Location: Loudon, New Hampshire, New Hampshire International Speedway
- Course: Permanent racing facility
- Course length: 1.058 miles (1.704 km)
- Distance: 300 laps, 317.4 mi (510.805 km)
- Average speed: 102.131 miles per hour (164.364 km/h)
- Attendance: 101,000

Pole position
Driver	Jeff Gordon	Hendrick Motorsports
- Time: 28.905

Most laps led
Driver	Jeff Gordon	Hendrick Motorsports
- Laps: 126

Winner
No. 88	Dale Jarrett	Robert Yates Racing

Television in the United States
- Network: TNT
- Announcers: Allen Bestwick, Benny Parsons, Wally Dallenbach Jr.

Radio in the United States
- Radio: Motor Racing Network

The 2001 New England 300 was the 19th stock car race of the 2001 NASCAR Winston Cup Series and the ninth iteration of the event. The race was held on Sunday, July 22, 2001, in Loudon, New Hampshire, at New Hampshire International Speedway, a 1.058-mile (1.703 km) permanent, oval-shaped, low-banked racetrack. The race took the scheduled 300 laps to complete. On the final restart with five to go, Dale Jarrett, driving for Robert Yates Racing, would perform a bump-and-run on teammate Ricky Rudd to pull away and win his 29th career NASCAR Winston Cup Series win and his fourth and final win of the season. Rudd was credited with a third-place finish. To fill out the podium, Jeff Gordon, driving for Hendrick Motorsports, would finish second.

== Background ==
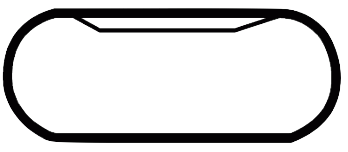
The layout of New Hampshire International Speedway, the venue where the race was held.

New Hampshire International Speedway is a 1.058-mile (1.703 km) oval speedway located in Loudon, New Hampshire which has hosted NASCAR racing annually since the early 1990s, as well as an IndyCar weekend and the oldest motorcycle race in North America, the Loudon Classic. Nicknamed "The Magic Mile", the speedway is often converted into a 1.6-mile (2.6 km) road course, which includes much of the oval. The track was originally the site of Bryar Motorsports Park before being purchased and redeveloped by Bob Bahre. The track is currently one of eight major NASCAR tracks owned and operated by Speedway Motorsports.

=== Entry list ===
- (R) denotes rookie driver.

#	Driver	Team	Make
1	Steve Park	Dale Earnhardt, Inc.	Chevrolet
01	Jason Leffler (R)	Chip Ganassi Racing with Felix Sabates	Dodge
2	Rusty Wallace	Penske Racing South	Ford
4	Kevin Lepage	Morgan–McClure Motorsports	Chevrolet
5	Terry Labonte	Hendrick Motorsports	Chevrolet
6	Mark Martin	Roush Racing	Ford
7	Mike Wallace	Ultra Motorsports	Ford
8	Dale Earnhardt Jr.	Dale Earnhardt, Inc.	Chevrolet
9	Bill Elliott	Evernham Motorsports	Dodge
10	Johnny Benson Jr.	MBV Motorsports	Pontiac
11	Brett Bodine	Brett Bodine Racing	Ford
12	Jeremy Mayfield	Penske Racing South	Ford
14	Ron Hornaday Jr. (R)	A. J. Foyt Enterprises	Pontiac
15	Michael Waltrip	Dale Earnhardt, Inc.	Chevrolet
17	Matt Kenseth	Roush Racing	Ford
18	Bobby Labonte	Joe Gibbs Racing	Pontiac
19	Casey Atwood (R)	Evernham Motorsports	Dodge
20	Tony Stewart	Joe Gibbs Racing	Pontiac
21	Elliott Sadler	Wood Brothers Racing	Ford
22	Ward Burton	Bill Davis Racing	Dodge
24	Jeff Gordon	Hendrick Motorsports	Chevrolet
25	Jerry Nadeau	Hendrick Motorsports	Chevrolet
26	Jimmy Spencer	Haas-Carter Motorsports	Ford
27	Kenny Wallace	Eel River Racing	Pontiac
28	Ricky Rudd	Robert Yates Racing	Ford
29	Kevin Harvick (R)	Richard Childress Racing	Chevrolet
31	Robby Gordon	Richard Childress Racing	Chevrolet
32	Ricky Craven	PPI Motorsports	Ford
33	Joe Nemechek	Andy Petree Racing	Chevrolet
36	Ken Schrader	MBV Motorsports	Pontiac
40	Sterling Marlin	Chip Ganassi Racing with Felix Sabates	Dodge
43	John Andretti	Petty Enterprises	Dodge
44	Buckshot Jones	Petty Enterprises	Dodge
45	Kyle Petty	Petty Enterprises	Dodge
50	Rick Mast	Midwest Transit Racing	Chevrolet
55	Bobby Hamilton	Andy Petree Racing	Chevrolet
66	Todd Bodine	Haas-Carter Motorsports	Ford
77	Robert Pressley	Jasper Motorsports	Ford
88	Dale Jarrett	Robert Yates Racing	Ford
90	Hut Stricklin	Donlavey Racing	Ford
92	Stacy Compton	Melling Racing	Dodge
93	Dave Blaney	Bill Davis Racing	Dodge
97	Kurt Busch (R)	Roush Racing	Ford
99	Jeff Burton	Roush Racing	Ford
Official entry list

== Practice ==
=== First practice ===
The first practice session was held on Friday, July 20, at 10:55 AM EST. The session would last for two hours. Ken Schrader, driving for MB2 Motorsports, would set the fastest time in the session, with a lap of 28.918 and an average speed of 131.710 miles per hour (211.967 km/h).

Pos.	#	Driver	Team	Make	Time	Speed
1	36	Ken Schrader	MB2 Motorsports	Pontiac	28.918	131.710
2	10	Johnny Benson Jr.	MBV Motorsports	Pontiac	28.935	131.633
3	28	Ricky Rudd	Robert Yates Racing	Ford	28.937	131.624
Full first practice results

=== Second practice ===
The second practice session was held on Saturday, July 21, at 9:45 AM EST. The session would last for 45 minutes. Johnny Benson Jr., driving for MBV Motorsports, would set the fastest time in the session, with a lap of 29.416 and an average speed of 129.481 miles per hour (208.379 km/h).

Pos.	#	Driver	Team	Make	Time	Speed
1	10	Johnny Benson Jr.	MBV Motorsports	Pontiac	29.416	129.481
2	29	Kevin Harvick (R)	Richard Childress Racing	Chevrolet	29.540	128.937
3	36	Ken Schrader	MB2 Motorsports	Pontiac	29.596	128.693
Full second practice results

=== Third and final practice ===
The final practice session, sometimes referred to as Happy Hour, was held on Saturday, July 21, at 11:00 AM EST. The session would last for 45 minutes. Johnny Benson Jr., driving for MBV Motorsports, would set the fastest time in the session, with a lap of 29.362 and an average speed of 129.719 miles per hour (208.762 km/h).

Pos.	#	Driver	Team	Make	Time	Speed
1	10	Johnny Benson Jr.	MBV Motorsports	Pontiac	29.362	129.719
2	20	Tony Stewart	Joe Gibbs Racing	Pontiac	29.460	129.287
3	29	Kevin Harvick (R)	Richard Childress Racing	Chevrolet	29.483	129.186
Full Happy Hour practice results

== Qualifying ==
Qualifying was held on Friday, July 20, at 2:15 PM EST. Each driver would have two laps to set a fastest time; the fastest of the two would count as their official qualifying lap. Positions 1-36 would be decided on time, while positions 37-43 would be based on provisionals. Six spots are awarded by the use of provisionals based on owner's points. The seventh is awarded to a past champion who has not otherwise qualified for the race. If no past champ needs the provisional, the next team in the owner points will be awarded a provisional.

Jeff Gordon, driving for Hendrick Motorsports, would win the pole, setting a time of 28.905 and an average speed of 131.770 miles per hour (212.063 km/h).

Mike Bliss was the only driver to fail to qualify.

=== Full qualifying results ===
Pos.	#	Driver	Team	Make	Time	Speed
1	24	Jeff Gordon	Hendrick Motorsports	Chevrolet	28.905	131.770
2	6	Mark Martin	Roush Racing	Ford	28.915	131.724
3	12	Jeremy Mayfield	Penske Racing South	Ford	28.917	131.715
4	55	Bobby Hamilton	Andy Petree Racing	Chevrolet	29.008	131.302
5	1	Steve Park	Dale Earnhardt, Inc.	Chevrolet	29.068	131.031
6	66	Todd Bodine	Haas-Carter Motorsports	Ford	29.071	131.017
7	77	Robert Pressley	Jasper Motorsports	Ford	29.076	130.995
8	36	Ken Schrader	MB2 Motorsports	Pontiac	29.092	130.923
9	88	Dale Jarrett	Robert Yates Racing	Ford	29.097	130.900
10	99	Jeff Burton	Roush Racing	Ford	29.110	130.842
11	14	Ron Hornaday Jr. (R)	A. J. Foyt Enterprises	Pontiac	29.112	130.833
12	9	Bill Elliott	Evernham Motorsports	Dodge	29.139	130.711
13	26	Jimmy Spencer	Haas-Carter Motorsports	Ford	29.141	130.702
14	28	Ricky Rudd	Robert Yates Racing	Ford	29.159	130.622
15	10	Johnny Benson Jr.	MBV Motorsports	Pontiac	29.169	130.577
16	90	Hut Stricklin	Donlavey Racing	Ford	29.200	130.438
17	43	John Andretti	Petty Enterprises	Dodge	29.228	130.313
18	15	Michael Waltrip	Dale Earnhardt, Inc.	Chevrolet	29.229	130.309
19	50	Rick Mast	Midwest Transit Racing	Chevrolet	29.247	130.229
20	32	Ricky Craven	PPI Motorsports	Ford	29.249	130.220
21	17	Matt Kenseth	Roush Racing	Ford	29.264	130.153
22	7	Mike Wallace	Ultra Motorsports	Ford	29.288	130.046
23	2	Rusty Wallace	Penske Racing South	Ford	29.315	129.927
24	29	Kevin Harvick (R)	Richard Childress Racing	Chevrolet	29.318	129.913
25	20	Tony Stewart	Joe Gibbs Racing	Pontiac	29.329	129.865
26	45	Kyle Petty	Petty Enterprises	Dodge	29.344	129.798
27	19	Casey Atwood (R)	Evernham Motorsports	Dodge	29.353	129.758
28	33	Joe Nemechek	Andy Petree Racing	Chevrolet	29.358	129.736
29	8	Dale Earnhardt Jr.	Dale Earnhardt, Inc.	Chevrolet	29.369	129.688
30	5	Terry Labonte	Hendrick Motorsports	Chevrolet	29.391	129.591
31	22	Ward Burton	Bill Davis Racing	Dodge	29.412	129.498
32	97	Kurt Busch (R)	Roush Racing	Ford	29.433	129.406
33	21	Elliott Sadler	Wood Brothers Racing	Ford	29.447	129.344
34	93	Dave Blaney	Bill Davis Racing	Dodge	29.453	129.318
35	18	Bobby Labonte	Joe Gibbs Racing	Pontiac	29.467	129.256
36	31	Robby Gordon	Richard Childress Racing	Chevrolet	29.514	129.051
Provisionals
37	40	Sterling Marlin	Chip Ganassi Racing with Felix Sabates	Dodge	29.532	128.972
38	25	Jerry Nadeau	Hendrick Motorsports	Chevrolet	29.730	128.113
39	11	Brett Bodine	Brett Bodine Racing	Ford	29.801	127.808
40	92	Stacy Compton	Melling Racing	Dodge	29.611	128.628
41	01	Jason Leffler (R)	Chip Ganassi Racing with Felix Sabates	Dodge	29.593	128.706
42	4	Kevin Lepage	Morgan–McClure Motorsports	Chevrolet	29.520	129.024
43	44	Buckshot Jones	Petty Enterprises	Dodge	29.607	128.645
Failed to qualify
44	27	Mike Bliss	Eel River Racing	Pontiac	29.673	128.576
Official qualifying results

== Race results ==
Fin	St	#	Driver	Team	Make	Laps	Led	Status	Pts	Winnings
1	9	88	Dale Jarrett	Robert Yates Racing	Ford	300	92	running	180	$238,027
2	1	24	Jeff Gordon	Hendrick Motorsports	Chevrolet	300	126	running	180	$147,427
3	14	28	Ricky Rudd	Robert Yates Racing	Ford	300	62	running	170	$105,097
4	13	26	Jimmy Spencer	Haas-Carter Motorsports	Ford	300	0	running	160	$86,160
5	25	20	Tony Stewart	Joe Gibbs Racing	Pontiac	300	0	running	155	$77,800
6	5	1	Steve Park	Dale Earnhardt, Inc.	Chevrolet	300	2	running	155	$77,043
7	35	18	Bobby Labonte	Joe Gibbs Racing	Pontiac	300	0	running	146	$97,977
8	24	29	Kevin Harvick (R)	Richard Childress Racing	Chevrolet	300	3	running	147	$92,077
9	29	8	Dale Earnhardt Jr.	Dale Earnhardt, Inc.	Chevrolet	300	0	running	138	$78,473
10	22	7	Mike Wallace	Ultra Motorsports	Ford	300	0	running	134	$70,770
11	10	99	Jeff Burton	Roush Racing	Ford	300	1	running	135	$90,296
12	27	19	Casey Atwood (R)	Evernham Motorsports	Dodge	300	13	running	132	$47,250
13	39	11	Brett Bodine	Brett Bodine Racing	Ford	300	0	running	124	$53,061
14	19	50	Rick Mast	Midwest Transit Racing	Chevrolet	300	0	running	121	$42,550
15	6	66	Todd Bodine	Haas-Carter Motorsports	Ford	300	0	running	118	$49,150
16	21	17	Matt Kenseth	Roush Racing	Ford	300	0	running	115	$54,550
17	37	40	Sterling Marlin	Chip Ganassi Racing with Felix Sabates	Dodge	300	1	running	117	$58,315
18	2	6	Mark Martin	Roush Racing	Ford	300	0	running	109	$88,626
19	7	77	Robert Pressley	Jasper Motorsports	Ford	300	0	running	106	$56,400
20	31	22	Ward Burton	Bill Davis Racing	Dodge	300	0	running	103	$81,110
21	12	9	Bill Elliott	Evernham Motorsports	Dodge	299	0	running	100	$70,523
22	8	36	Ken Schrader	MB2 Motorsports	Pontiac	299	0	running	97	$53,025
23	17	43	John Andretti	Petty Enterprises	Dodge	299	0	running	94	$79,302
24	43	44	Buckshot Jones	Petty Enterprises	Dodge	299	0	running	91	$52,025
25	36	31	Robby Gordon	Richard Childress Racing	Chevrolet	299	0	running	88	$76,999
26	26	45	Kyle Petty	Petty Enterprises	Dodge	299	0	running	85	$40,525
27	41	01	Jason Leffler (R)	Chip Ganassi Racing with Felix Sabates	Dodge	299	0	running	82	$51,350
28	18	15	Michael Waltrip	Dale Earnhardt, Inc.	Chevrolet	299	0	running	79	$50,200
29	4	55	Bobby Hamilton	Andy Petree Racing	Chevrolet	299	0	running	76	$51,550
30	42	4	Kevin Lepage	Morgan–McClure Motorsports	Chevrolet	299	0	running	73	$42,925
31	40	92	Stacy Compton	Melling Racing	Dodge	298	0	running	70	$39,800
32	30	5	Terry Labonte	Hendrick Motorsports	Chevrolet	298	0	running	67	$72,405
33	38	25	Jerry Nadeau	Hendrick Motorsports	Chevrolet	291	0	crash	64	$47,550
34	11	14	Ron Hornaday Jr. (R)	A. J. Foyt Enterprises	Pontiac	258	0	running	61	$39,425
35	16	90	Hut Stricklin	Donlavey Racing	Ford	255	0	ignition	58	$39,300
36	15	10	Johnny Benson Jr.	MBV Motorsports	Pontiac	232	0	crash	55	$47,175
37	34	93	Dave Blaney	Bill Davis Racing	Dodge	228	0	running	52	$39,050
38	20	32	Ricky Craven	PPI Motorsports	Ford	224	0	engine	49	$38,925
39	3	12	Jeremy Mayfield	Penske Racing South	Ford	211	0	running	46	$79,659
40	33	21	Elliott Sadler	Wood Brothers Racing	Ford	165	0	crash	43	$56,800
41	28	33	Joe Nemechek	Andy Petree Racing	Chevrolet	129	0	crash	40	$67,020
42	32	97	Kurt Busch (R)	Roush Racing	Ford	74	0	overheating	37	$46,700
43	23	2	Rusty Wallace	Penske Racing South	Ford	11	0	engine	34	$83,791
Official race results

Previous race: 2001 Tropicana 400	NASCAR Winston Cup Series; 2001 season	Next race: 2001 Pennsylvania 500
