= 2001 NASCAR Winston Cup Series =

American motorsport season

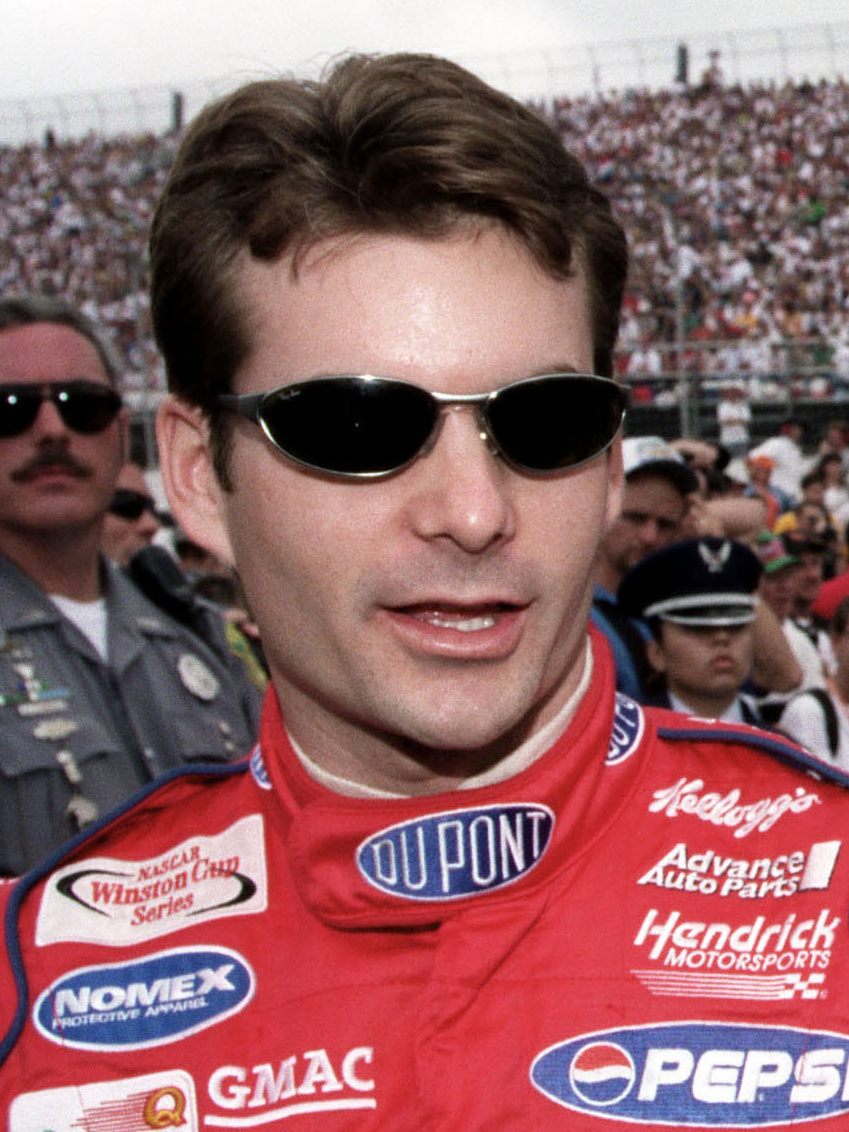
Jeff Gordon, the 2001 Winston Cup Series champion

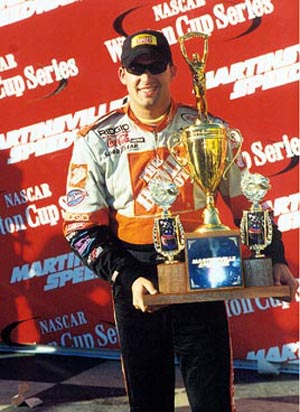
Tony Stewart came in second behind Gordon by 349 points.

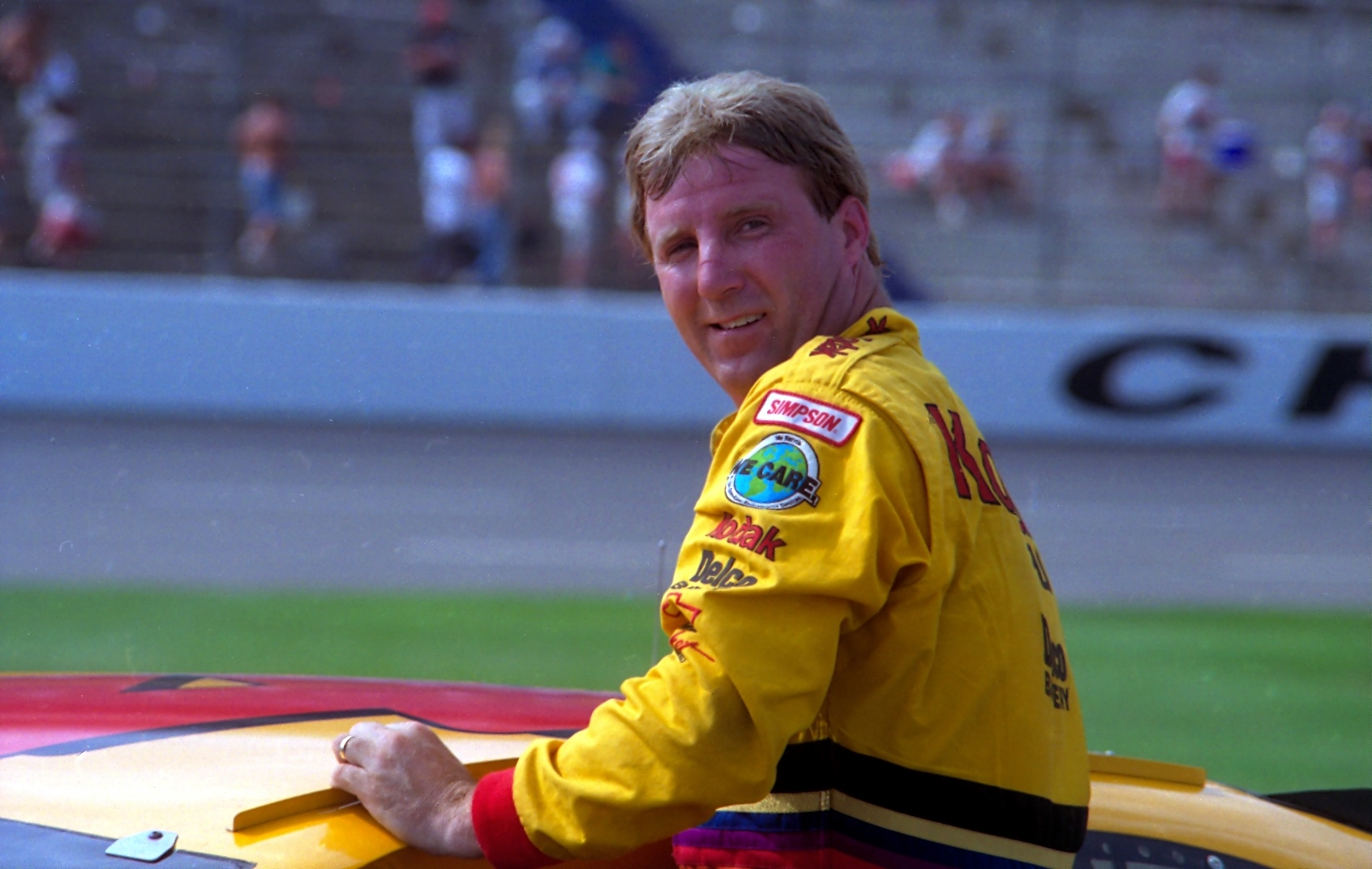
Sterling Marlin (pictured here in 1996), finished third in the championship.

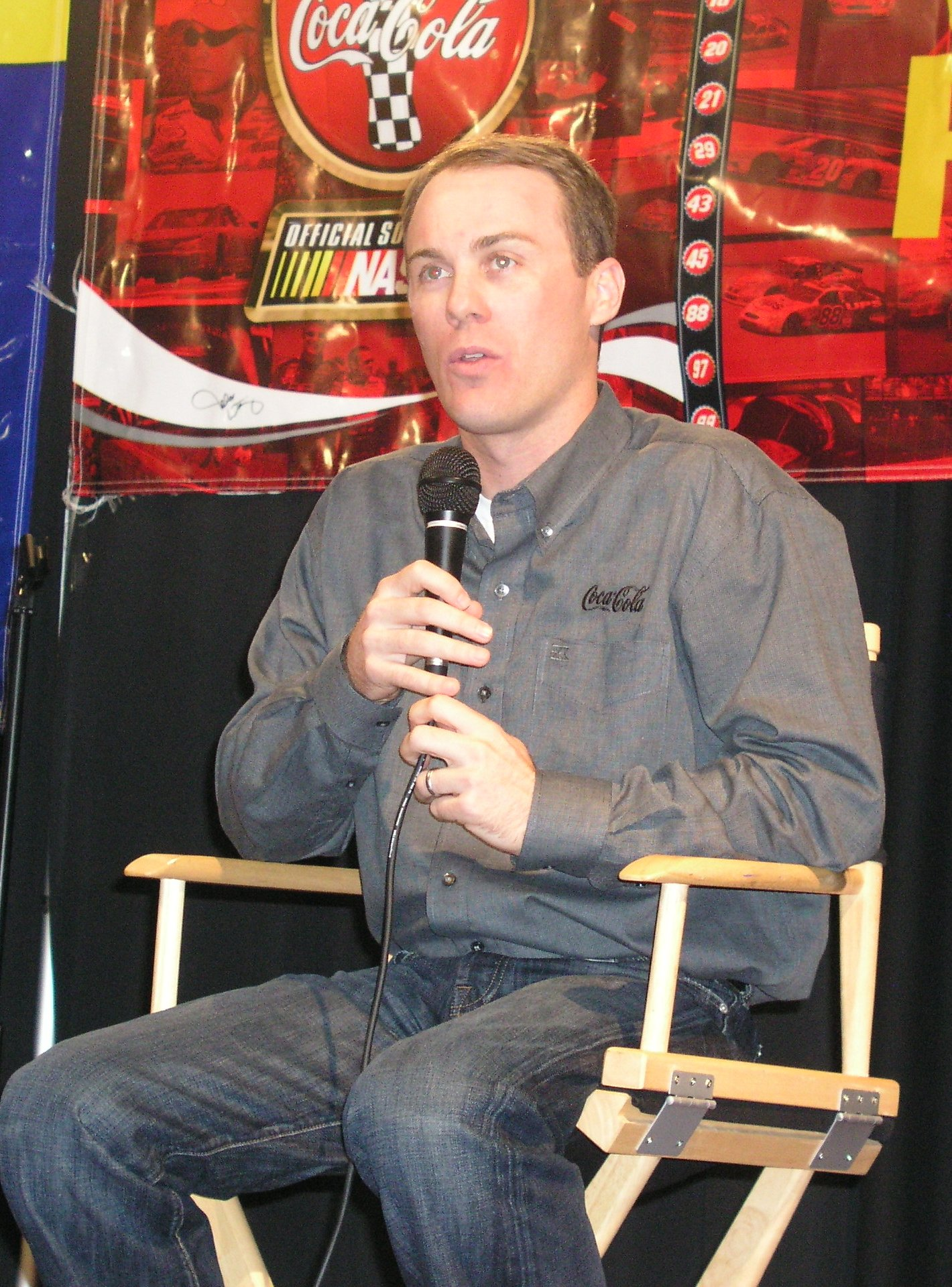
Kevin Harvick (pictured here in 2006), won Rookie of the year.

The 2001 NASCAR Winston Cup Series was the 53rd season of professional stock car racing in the United States, the 30th modern-era Cup series. It began on February 11, 2001, at Daytona International Speedway and ended on November 23, 2001, at New Hampshire International Speedway. Jeff Gordon of Hendrick Motorsports was declared as the series champion for the fourth time in seven years.

The season was marred by a two-car collision at the end of the season-opening Daytona 500, which claimed the life of seven-time Series champion Dale Earnhardt. The accident resulted in safety upgrades being instituted. Earnhardt's death would be the last for a full-time driver until 2026, when Kyle Busch died days before the 2026 Coca-Cola 600 due to pneumonia and sepsis. It remains the most recent death of a driver to come as a direct result of injuries sustained in a crash during Cup Series competition. It also was the first year to have a unified television contract with Fox Sports, NBC Sports, and Turner Sports/TNT broadcasting the season's races; previous seasons saw each racetrack negotiate their own TV coverage, creating a patchwork of broadcast companies covering races throughout the season. Dodge returned to the sport for the first time since 1985 under DaimlerChrysler and Mercedes-Benz support after DaimlerChrysler spent six years in the CART FedEx Championship Series via the Mercedes-Benz brand as an engine supplier in addition alongside Formula One programme under Mercedes-Benz branding as a factory engine supplier to West McLaren team. Chevrolet captured the NASCAR Manufacturers' Championship with 16 wins and 248 points.

== Teams and drivers ==
=== Complete schedule ===
Manufacturer	Team	No.	Driver(s)	Crew Chief
Chevrolet	Andy Petree Racing	33	Joe Nemechek 31	Chris Carrier
Chevrolet	Andy Petree Racing	33	Bobby Hamilton Jr. 3	Chris Carrier
Chevrolet	Andy Petree Racing	33	Wally Dallenbach Jr. 1	Chris Carrier
Chevrolet	Andy Petree Racing	33	Scott Pruett 1	Chris Carrier
Chevrolet	Andy Petree Racing	55	Bobby Hamilton	Jimmy Elledge
Chevrolet	Dale Earnhardt, Inc.	1	Steve Park 24	Paul Andrews
Chevrolet	Dale Earnhardt, Inc.	1	Kenny Wallace 12	Paul Andrews
Chevrolet	Dale Earnhardt, Inc.	8	Dale Earnhardt Jr.	Tony Eury Sr.
Chevrolet	Dale Earnhardt, Inc.	15	Michael Waltrip	Scott Eggleston 13; Steve Hmiel 12; Slugger Labbe 11
Chevrolet	Hendrick Motorsports	5	Terry Labonte	Gary DeHart
Chevrolet	Hendrick Motorsports	24	Jeff Gordon	Robbie Loomis
Chevrolet	Hendrick Motorsports	25	Jerry Nadeau	Tony Furr
Chevrolet	Morgan-McClure Motorsports	4	Robby Gordon 5	David Ifft
Chevrolet	Morgan-McClure Motorsports	4	Kevin Lepage 23	David Ifft
Chevrolet	Morgan-McClure Motorsports	4	Bobby Hamilton Jr. 7	David Ifft
Chevrolet	Morgan-McClure Motorsports	4	Rich Bickle 1	David Ifft
Chevrolet	Richard Childress Racing	3/29	Dale Earnhardt 1	Kevin Hamlin
Chevrolet	Richard Childress Racing	3/29	Kevin Harvick (R) 35	Kevin Hamlin
Chevrolet	Richard Childress Racing	31	Mike Skinner 23	Royce McGee
Chevrolet	Richard Childress Racing	31	Robby Gordon 12	Royce McGee
Chevrolet	Richard Childress Racing	31	Jeff Green 1	Royce McGee
Dodge	Bill Davis Racing	22	Ward Burton	Tommy Baldwin Jr.
Dodge	Bill Davis Racing	93	Dave Blaney	Doug Randolph
Dodge	Chip Ganassi Racing with Felix Sabates	40	Sterling Marlin	Lee McCall
Dodge	Chip Ganassi Racing with Felix Sabates	01	Jason Leffler (R) 34	Kevin Cram
Dodge	Chip Ganassi Racing with Felix Sabates	01	Scott Pruett 1	Kevin Cram
Dodge	Chip Ganassi Racing with Felix Sabates	01	Dorsey Schroeder 1	Kevin Cram
Dodge	Evernham Motorsports	9	Bill Elliott	Mike Ford
Dodge	Evernham Motorsports	19	Casey Atwood (R)	Patrick Donahue
Dodge	Melling Racing	92	Stacy Compton	Chad Knaus
Dodge	Petty Enterprises	43	John Andretti	Greg Steadman
Dodge	Petty Enterprises	44	Buckshot Jones 35	Mark Tutor
Dodge	Petty Enterprises	44	Wally Dallenbach Jr. 1	Mark Tutor
Dodge	Petty Enterprises	45	Kyle Petty	Chris Hussey
Ford	Brett Bodine Racing	11	Brett Bodine	Mike Hillman
Ford	Donlavey Racing	90	Hut Stricklin 29	Bobby King
Ford	Donlavey Racing	90	Brian Simo 2	Bobby King
Ford	Donlavey Racing	90	Rick Mast 5	Bobby King
Ford	Haas-Carter Motorsports	26	Jimmy Spencer	Donnie Wingo
Ford	Haas-Carter Motorsports	66	Todd Bodine	Larry Carter
Ford	Jasper Motorsports	77	Robert Pressley 34	Ryan Pemberton
Ford	Jasper Motorsports	77	Boris Said 2	Ryan Pemberton
Ford	Penske Racing	2	Rusty Wallace	Robin Pemberton
Ford	Penske Racing	12	Jeremy Mayfield 28	Peter Sospenzo
Ford	Penske Racing	12	Mike Wallace 8	Peter Sospenzo
Ford	PPI Motorsports	32	Ricky Craven	Mike Beam
Ford	Robert Yates Racing	28	Ricky Rudd	Michael McSwain
Ford	Robert Yates Racing	88	Dale Jarrett	Todd Parrott
Ford	Roush Racing	6	Mark Martin	Jimmy Fennig
Ford	Roush Racing	17	Matt Kenseth	Robbie Reiser
Ford	Roush Racing	97	Kurt Busch (R)	Matt Chambers 6 Ben Leslie 30
Ford	Roush Racing	99	Jeff Burton	Frank Stoddard
Ford	Ultra Motorsports	7	Mike Wallace 25	Jim Long
Ford	Ultra Motorsports	7	Ted Musgrave 1	Jim Long
Ford	Ultra Motorsports	7	Robby Gordon 2	Jim Long
Ford	Ultra Motorsports	7	Kevin Lepage 8	Jim Long
Ford	Wood Brothers Racing	21	Elliott Sadler	Pat Tryson
Pontiac	A. J. Foyt Racing	14	Ron Hornaday Jr. (R)	Donnie Brown
Pontiac	Joe Gibbs Racing	18	Bobby Labonte	Jimmy Makar
Pontiac	Joe Gibbs Racing	20	Tony Stewart	Greg Zipadelli
Pontiac	MBV Motorsports	10	Johnny Benson	James Ince
Pontiac	MBV Motorsports	36	Ken Schrader	Sammy Johns

=== Limited schedule ===
Manufacturer	Team	No.	Driver(s)	Crew Chief	Rounds
Chevrolet	BAM Racing	49	Rich Bickle		1
Chevrolet	Bill McAnally Racing	62	Brendan Gaughan		1
Chevrolet	Hendrick Motorsports	48	Jimmie Johnson	Ken Howes	3
Chevrolet	Marcis Auto Racing	71	Dave Marcis	Bob Marcis	13
Chevrolet	Marcis Auto Racing	71	Dick Trickle	Bob Marcis	1
Chevrolet	Marcis Auto Racing	72	Dwayne Leik	Bob Marcis	1
Chevrolet	Midwest Transit Racing	50	Rick Mast	Greg Connors	16
Chevrolet	Midwest Transit Racing	50	Rich Bickle	Greg Connors	1
Chevrolet	NEMCO Motorsports	87	Ron Fellows	Brian Pattie	2
Chevrolet	Norm Benning Racing	84	Norm Benning		1
Chevrolet	Richard Childress Racing	30	Jeff Green	Todd Berrier	9
Chevrolet	Richard Childress Racing	30	Kevin Harvick (R)	Todd Berrier	none
Chevrolet	TWC Motorsports	68	Anthony Lazzaro		2
Chevrolet	SCORE Motorsports	13	Hermie Sadler	Jim Long	10
Dodge	Bill Davis Racing	23	Hut Stricklin	Tommy Baldwin Jr.	1
Dodge	Bogart Racing	70	Rick Bogart		1
Dodge	Chip Ganassi Racing with Felix Sabates	04	Jason Leffler (R)	Kevin Cram	1
Ford	Bob Schacht Motorsports	75	Stuart Kirby		1
Ford	Brett Bodine Racing	09	Geoff Bodine		2
Ford	Donlavey Racing	91	Rick Mast	Junie Donlavey	1
Ford	Hover Motorsports	80	Morgan Shepherd		1
Ford	Larry Clement Racing	46	Frank Kimmel		3
Ford	Michael Kranefuss Racing	84	Shawna Robinson		4
Ford	Penske Racing	02	Ryan Newman	Matt Borland	7
Ford	Phoenix Racing	51	Jeff Purvis		4
Ford	PPI Motorsports	96	Andy Houston (R)	Joe Garone	25
Ford	Sadler Brothers Racing	95	Ed Berrier		1
Ford	Shepherd Racing Ventures	89	Morgan Shepherd		1
Ford	Team CLR	57	David Keith		2
Ford	Team CLR	57	Derrike Cope		3
Pontiac	A. J. Foyt Racing	41	Mark Green	Phillipe Lopez	1
Pontiac	BAM Racing	49	Andy Hillenburg		4
Pontiac	Eel River Racing	27	Kenny Wallace	Barry Dodson	16
Pontiac	Eel River Racing	27	Mike Bliss	Barry Dodson	3
Pontiac	Eel River Racing	27	Rick Mast	Barry Dodson	9
Pontiac	Quest Motor Racing	37	Derrike Cope	Joey Knuckles	3
Chevrolet Ford	Dark Horse Motorsports	47	Lance Hooper		3
Dodge Ford	Mansion Motorsports	85	Carl Long		9

== Schedule ==
No.	Race title	Track	Location	Date
NC	Budweiser Shootout	Daytona International Speedway	Daytona Beach, Florida	February 11
NC	Gatorade 125s	Daytona International Speedway	Daytona Beach, Florida	February 15
1	Daytona 500	Daytona International Speedway	Daytona Beach, Florida	February 18
2	Dura Lube 400	Rockingham Speedway	Rockingham, North Carolina	February 25–26
3	UAW-DaimlerChrysler 400	Las Vegas Motor Speedway	Las Vegas, Nevada	March 4
4	Cracker Barrel Old Country Store 500	Atlanta Motor Speedway	Hampton, Georgia	March 11
5	Carolina Dodge Dealers 400	Darlington Raceway	Darlington, South Carolina	March 18
6	Food City 500	Bristol Motor Speedway	Bristol, Tennessee	March 25
7	Harrah's 500	Texas Motor Speedway	Fort Worth, Texas	April 1
8	Virginia 500	Martinsville Speedway	Ridgeway, Virginia	April 8
9	Talladega 500	Talladega Superspeedway	Lincoln, Alabama	April 22
10	NAPA Auto Parts 500	California Speedway	Fontana, California	April 29
11	Pontiac Excitement 400	Richmond International Raceway	Richmond, Virginia	May 5
NC	No Bull Sprint	Charlotte Motor Speedway	Concord, North Carolina	May 19
NC	Winston Open	Charlotte Motor Speedway	Concord, North Carolina	May 19
NC	The Winston	Charlotte Motor Speedway	Concord, North Carolina	May 19–20
12	Coca-Cola 600	Charlotte Motor Speedway	Concord, North Carolina	May 27
13	MBNA Platinum 400	Dover Downs International Speedway	Dover, Delaware	June 3
14	Kmart 400	Michigan International Speedway	Cambridge Township, Michigan	June 10
15	Pocono 500	Pocono Raceway	Long Pond, Pennsylvania	June 17
16	Dodge/Save Mart 350	Sears Point Raceway	Sonoma, California	June 24
17	Pepsi 400	Daytona International Speedway	Daytona Beach, Florida	July 7
18	Tropicana 400	Chicagoland Speedway	Joliet, Illinois	July 15
19	New England 300	New Hampshire International Speedway	Loudon, New Hampshire	July 22
20	Pennsylvania 500	Pocono Raceway	Long Pond, Pennsylvania	July 29
21	Brickyard 400	Indianapolis Motor Speedway	Speedway, Indiana	August 5
22	Global Crossing at The Glen	Watkins Glen International	Watkins Glen, New York	August 12
23	Pepsi 400 presented by Meijer	Michigan International Speedway	Cambridge Township, Michigan	August 19
24	Sharpie 500	Bristol Motor Speedway	Bristol, Tennessee	August 25
25	Mountain Dew Southern 500	Darlington Raceway	Darlington, South Carolina	September 2
26	Chevrolet Monte Carlo 400	Richmond International Raceway	Richmond, Virginia	September 8
27	MBNA Cal Ripken Jr. 400	Dover Downs International Speedway	Dover, Delaware	September 23
28	Protection One 400	Kansas Speedway	Kansas City, Kansas	September 30
29	UAW-GM Quality 500	Charlotte Motor Speedway	Concord, North Carolina	October 7
30	Old Dominion 500	Martinsville Speedway	Ridgeway, Virginia	October 15
31	EA Sports 500	Talladega Superspeedway	Lincoln, Alabama	October 21
32	Checker Auto Parts 500 presented by Pennzoil	Phoenix International Raceway	Avondale, Arizona	October 28
33	Pop Secret Microwave Popcorn 400	Rockingham Speedway	Rockingham, North Carolina	November 4
34	Pennzoil Freedom 400	Homestead–Miami Speedway	Homestead, Florida	November 11
35	NAPA 500	Atlanta Motor Speedway	Hampton, Georgia	November 18
36	New Hampshire 300	New Hampshire International Speedway	Loudon, New Hampshire	November 23

== Races ==
No.	Race	Pole position	Most laps led	Winning driver	Manufacturer	Report
NC	Budweiser Shootout	Ken Schrader	Tony Stewart	Tony Stewart	Pontiac	
NC	Gatorade 125 (Race 1)	Bill Elliott	Dale Earnhardt	Sterling Marlin	Dodge	Report
NC	Gatorade 125 (Race 2)	Stacy Compton	Dale Earnhardt Jr.	Mike Skinner	Chevrolet	Report
1	Daytona 500	Bill Elliott	Ward Burton	Michael Waltrip	Chevrolet	Report
2	Dura Lube 400	Jeff Gordon	Jeff Gordon	Steve Park	Chevrolet	Report
3	UAW-Daimler Chrysler 400	Dale Jarrett	Mark Martin	Jeff Gordon	Chevrolet	Report
4	Cracker Barrel Old Country Store 500	Dale Jarrett	Jeff Gordon	Kevin Harvick	Chevrolet	Report
5	Carolina Dodge Dealers 400	Jeff Gordon	Steve Park	Dale Jarrett	Ford	Report
6	Food City 500	Mark Martin	Kevin Harvick	Elliott Sadler	Ford	Report
7	Harrah's 500	Dale Earnhardt Jr.	Dale Jarrett	Dale Jarrett	Ford	Report
8	Virginia 500	Jeff Gordon	Bobby Hamilton	Dale Jarrett	Ford	Report
9	Talladega 500	Stacy Compton	Sterling Marlin	Bobby Hamilton	Chevrolet	Report
10	NAPA Auto Parts 500	Bobby Labonte	Rusty Wallace	Rusty Wallace	Ford	Report
11	Pontiac Excitement 400	Mark Martin	Rusty Wallace	Tony Stewart	Pontiac	Report
NC	Winston Open	Johnny Benson	Ryan Newman	Johnny Benson	Pontiac	Report
NC	No Bull Sprint	Mike Wallace	Todd Bodine	Todd Bodine	Ford	Report
NC	The Winston	Rusty Wallace	Ward Burton; Johnny Benson	Jeff Gordon	Chevrolet	Report
12	Coca-Cola 600	Ryan Newman	Jeff Burton	Jeff Burton	Ford	Report
13	MBNA Platinum 400	Dale Jarrett	Jeff Gordon	Jeff Gordon	Chevrolet	Report
14	Kmart 400	Jeff Gordon	Jeff Gordon	Jeff Gordon	Chevrolet	Report
15	Pocono 500	Ricky Rudd	Jeff Gordon	Ricky Rudd	Ford	Report
16	Dodge/Save Mart 350	Jeff Gordon	Jeff Gordon	Tony Stewart	Pontiac	Report
17	Pepsi 400	Sterling Marlin	Dale Earnhardt Jr.	Dale Earnhardt Jr.	Chevrolet	Report
18	Tropicana 400	Todd Bodine	Kevin Harvick	Kevin Harvick	Chevrolet	Report
19	New England 300	Jeff Gordon	Jeff Gordon	Dale Jarrett	Ford	Report
20	Pennsylvania 500	Todd Bodine	Jeff Gordon	Bobby Labonte	Pontiac	Report
21	Brickyard 400	Jimmy Spencer	Steve Park	Jeff Gordon	Chevrolet	Report
22	Global Crossing @ The Glen	Dale Jarrett	Jeff Burton	Jeff Gordon	Chevrolet	Report
23	Pepsi 400 presented by Meijer	Ricky Craven	Bill Elliott	Sterling Marlin	Dodge	Report
24	Sharpie 500	Jeff Green	Jeff Gordon	Tony Stewart	Pontiac	Report
25	Mountain Dew Southern 500	Kurt Busch	Jeff Gordon	Ward Burton	Dodge	Report
26	Chevrolet Monte Carlo 400	Jeff Gordon	Rusty Wallace	Ricky Rudd	Ford	Report
27	MBNA Cal Ripken Jr. 400	Dale Jarrett	Dale Earnhardt Jr.	Dale Earnhardt Jr.	Chevrolet	Report
28	Protection One 400	Jason Leffler	Rusty Wallace	Jeff Gordon	Chevrolet	Report
29	UAW-GM Quality 500	Jimmy Spencer	Sterling Marlin	Sterling Marlin	Dodge	Report
30	Old Dominion 500	Todd Bodine	Ricky Craven	Ricky Craven	Ford	Report
31	EA Sports 500	Stacy Compton	Dale Earnhardt Jr.	Dale Earnhardt Jr.	Chevrolet	Report
32	Checker Auto Parts 500 presented by Pennzoil	Casey Atwood	Jeff Burton	Jeff Burton	Ford	Report
33	Pop Secret Microwave Popcorn 400	Kenny Wallace	Joe Nemechek	Joe Nemechek	Chevrolet	Report
34	Pennzoil Freedom 400	Bill Elliott	Tony Stewart	Bill Elliott	Dodge	Report
35	NAPA 500	Dale Earnhardt Jr.	Dale Earnhardt Jr.	Bobby Labonte	Pontiac	Report
36	New Hampshire 300	Jeff Gordon	Jeff Gordon	Robby Gordon	Chevrolet	Report

=== Budweiser Shootout ===
The Budweiser Shootout, an invitational event for all recent Bud Pole winners, was held February 11 at Daytona International Speedway. Ken Schrader drew the pole. This was the first race broadcast on Fox.

Top 10 Results

1. #20 - Tony Stewart
2. #3 - Dale Earnhardt
3. #2 - Rusty Wallace
4. #88 - Dale Jarrett
5. #99 - Jeff Burton
6. #8 - Dale Earnhardt Jr.
7. 18 - Bobby Labonte
8. #6 - Mark Martin
9. #28 - Ricky Rudd
10. #31 - Mike Skinner

=== Gatorade 125s ===
The Gatorade 125s, qualifying races for the Daytona 500, were held February 15 at Daytona International Speedway. Bill Elliott and Stacy Compton started on pole for both races, respectively. The qualifying races were broadcast live for the first time; races prior to 2001 were broadcast on tape delay.

Race One Top 10 Results

1. #40 - Sterling Marlin
2. #25 - Jerry Nadeau
3. #3 - Dale Earnhardt
4. #96 - Andy Houston
5. #26 - Jimmy Spencer
6. #24 - Jeff Gordon
7. #01 - Jason Leffler
8. #51 - Jeff Purvis
9. #15 - Michael Waltrip
10. #19 - Casey Atwood

Race Two Top 10 Results

1. #31 - Mike Skinner*
2. #8 - Dale Earnhardt Jr.
3. #99 - Jeff Burton
4. #22 - Ward Burton
5. #2 - Rusty Wallace
6. #36 - Ken Schrader
7. #17 - Matt Kenseth
8. #32 - Ricky Craven
9. #93 - Dave Blaney
10. #6 - Mark Martin
- Race Two ended with one of the closest finishes in modern Cup Series history, with Skinner beating Earnhardt Jr. by a margin of 0.004 seconds. This was also Skinner's final career overall Cup Series victory (All of Skinner's Cup victories were in non-points races.)

=== 43rd Daytona 500 ===
The 43rd Daytona 500 was held February 18, 2001 at Daytona International Speedway.

Top 10 Results

1. #15 - Michael Waltrip*
2. #8 - Dale Earnhardt Jr.
3. #2 - Rusty Wallace
4. #28 - Ricky Rudd
5. #9 - Bill Elliott*
6. #7 - Mike Wallace
7. #40 - Sterling Marlin
8. #55 - Bobby Hamilton
9. #12 - Jeremy Mayfield
10. #92 - Stacy Compton*

Failed to qualify: Dave Marcis (#71), Todd Bodine (#66), Hut Stricklin (#90), Rick Mast (#50), Derrike Cope (#37), Norm Benning (#84), Carl Long (#85), Morgan Shepherd (#80), Dwayne Leik (#72)

- Dale Earnhardt, 7 time Winston Cup champion, widely regarded by drivers and fans as one of the greatest NASCAR drivers of all-time, was battling for 3rd position, racing in defense mode in the closing laps of the race, trying to block the entire field, so he could protect the lead of his 2 team cars of Michael Waltrip and son Dale Earnhardt, Jr.. However, in turns 3 and 4 on the final lap, Earnhardt misjudged on blocking Sterling Marlin, who held his line on the inside lane, and got loose off of Marlin's right front fender. Earnhardt would over correct his car, shoot his car up in front of the field, collect Ken Schrader by making contact with Schrader's driver's side door, and both cars would crash into the turn 4 wall. The angle of Earnhardt's car getting into Schrader made him crash into the wall head on. Schrader's car sustained right front and passenger side damage. Schrader climbed out of his car right away. However, Dale Earnhardt died instantly as a result of his injuries. His cause of death was a basilar skull fracture. Officially, Earnhardt finished 12th, and Schrader finished 13th, both 1 lap down.
- After Darrell Waltrip retired from Winston Cup racing at the end of 2000, Dale Earnhardt went into 2001 as NASCAR's winningest active driver with 76 career victories. He had been NASCAR's winningest active champion since 1993 following Richard Petty's retirement.
- In 22 full-time seasons, Dale Earnhardt would unexpectedly finish his career with 676 career starts, 648 consecutive starts, 7 NASCAR championships, 3 championship runner-up finishes, 14 top 5 points finishes, 20 top 10 points finishes, 22 poles, 76 career wins, 281 top 5s, and 428 top 10s.
- This was the first race that featured cars from Chrysler Motors (in this case, the Dodge manufacturing family) since 1985.
- 50th career pole for Bill Elliott. This was Elliott's fourth Daytona 500 pole in his career, and the first time driving a Dodge. This was Elliott's first pole since Richmond back in September 1997. As of 2020, Bill Elliott is the only driver to score his 50th career pole in the Daytona 500.
- Michael Waltrip won his first career points race in his 463rd career start, the longest drought of any driver in NASCAR history before getting their first win.
- Stacy Compton, the outside pole-sitter, scored his only Top 10 finish in his career in this race.
- Rookies Andy Houston, Casey Atwood, Buckshot Jones, Kurt Busch, Ron Hornaday Jr., and Jason Leffler made their first Daytona 500 appearances in this race. This was also the only Daytona 500 start for Houston, Jones, and Hornaday Jr.
- Tony Stewart took a wild ride in this race on lap 173, getting turned by Ward Burton, going over Robby Gordon, flipping twice, and landing on his teammate Bobby Labonte.

=== Dura Lube 400 ===
The Dura Lube 400 started on February 25 but ended on February 26 due to a rain delay, making it a two-day race at the North Carolina Speedway. Jeff Gordon won the pole.

Top 10 Results

1. #1 - Steve Park*
2. #18 - Bobby Labonte
3. #24 - Jeff Gordon
4. #20 - Tony Stewart
5. #32 - Ricky Craven
6. #10 - Johnny Benson
7. #2 - Rusty Wallace*
8. #40 - Sterling Marlin
9. #93 - Dave Blaney
10. #88 - Dale Jarrett

Failed to qualify: Andy Houston (#96), Kyle Petty (#45)

- This race was won by DEI driver Steve Park in an emotional victory just one week after Earnhardt's death. It was his last career victory.
- Following the death of Dale Earnhardt, NASCAR on FOX, and later on in the season, NASCAR on NBC and TNT, would pay tribute to Dale Earnhardt with a silent lap 3. Unfortunately, however, in this race, along with the next 2 races, the caution would come out either on or before the 3rd lap.
- This would be the first Winston Cup race without Dale Earnhardt since the 1979 Southern 500 at Darlington. Earnhardt's career unexpectedly ended after 648 consecutive starts (his career ended with a total of 676).
- Richard Childress placed Busch Grand National driver Kevin Harvick into the car formerly driven by Earnhardt, changed the car's number from #3 to #29, and the paint scheme from primarily black to primarily white. Because of that, the race was Harvick's first start in the Winston Cup Series.
- Dale Earnhardt Jr. suffered a crash on the first lap of the race, in which his car hit the outside wall in an eerily similar fashion to his father's fatal crash a week earlier, but Earnhardt Jr. was not seriously injured.
- After this race, Rusty Wallace would take over the points lead, making this the first time since 1998 that he has done so. This would be the only race of 2001 that Rusty would leave an event as the points leader. This was also the final time in his career that Rusty Wallace would lead the points.

=== UAW-Daimler Chrysler 400 ===
The UAW-Daimler Chrysler 400 was held March 4 at Las Vegas Motor Speedway. Dale Jarrett won the pole.

Top 10 Results

1. #24 - Jeff Gordon*
2. #88 - Dale Jarrett
3. #40 - Sterling Marlin
4. #10 - Johnny Benson
5. #66 - Todd Bodine
6. #6 - Mark Martin
7. #1 - Steve Park
8. #29 - Kevin Harvick
9. #14 - Ron Hornaday Jr.*
10. #26 - Jimmy Spencer

Failed to qualify: Kyle Petty (#45), Brendan Gaughan (#62), Andy Houston (#96), Rick Mast (#50)

- Jeff Gordon won the Winston No Bull 5 Million Bonus.
- This was the 53rd career win for Jeff Gordon. With this win, he would tie Rusty Wallace for eighth on NASCAR's all-time win list.
- Rusty Wallace would lose the points lead after finishing this race in 43rd (last position), and with that, this would mark the last time ever that he would lead the points standings in his career.
- This was Ron Hornaday Jr.'s only Top 10 finish in the Winston Cup Series.

=== Cracker Barrel Old Country Store 500 ===
The Cracker Barrel Old Country Store 500 was held March 11 at Atlanta Motor Speedway. Dale Jarrett won the pole.

Top 10 Results

1. #29 - Kevin Harvick*
2. #24 - Jeff Gordon
3. #25 - Jerry Nadeau
4. #88 - Dale Jarrett
5. #5 - Terry Labonte
6. #28 - Ricky Rudd
7. #10 - Johnny Benson
8. #36 - Ken Schrader
9. #31 - Mike Skinner
10. #97 - Kurt Busch (-1 lap)

Failed to qualify: Rick Mast (#50), Carl Long (#85), Casey Atwood (#19)

- This race is best remembered for the exciting finish between rookie Kevin Harvick and three-time Cup champion Jeff Gordon. Harvick would outduel the champion in a spectacular finish, winning by only .006 seconds, being the second-closest finish in NASCAR history at the time. Harvick performed a burnout on the front stretch with three fingers aloft. It was his first victory in only his third start in the Winston Cup Series, a then-record for fewest starts to first win in the Modern Era of Cup racing.
- Beginning with this race, fans would honor Dale Earnhardt on lap 3 with a silent salute by standing and holding up three fingers. Following the September 11th attacks, the honor would be extended to honor those who were lost on that day.
- This race was originally planned to be Harvick's Cup series debut; as Richard Childress was planning to have Harvick drive #30 AOL-sponsored Chevrolet Monte Carlo for 6 races before moving to the Winston Cup series full-time in 2002.

=== Carolina Dodge Dealers 400 ===
The Carolina Dodge Dealers 400 was held March 18 at Darlington Raceway. Jeff Gordon started on pole after qualifying was rained out.

Top Ten Results

1. #88 - Dale Jarrett
2. #1 - Steve Park
3. #12 - Jeremy Mayfield
4. #26 - Jimmy Spencer
5. #40 - Sterling Marlin
6. #43 - John Andretti
7. #10 - Johnny Benson
8. #28 - Ricky Rudd
9. #55 - Bobby Hamilton
10. #2 - Rusty Wallace

Failed to qualify: Andy Houston (#96), Rick Mast (#50), Dave Marcis (#71)

- After 3 straight weeks of having a caution period on either lap 3 or before lap 3, NASCAR finally had lap 3 under green. NASCAR on FOX paid their tributes to Dale Earnhardt with a silent lap 3.

=== Food City 500 ===
The Food City 500 was held March 25 at Bristol Motor Speedway. Mark Martin won the pole.

Top Ten Results

1. #21 - Elliott Sadler*
2. #43 - John Andretti
3. #12 - Jeremy Mayfield
4. #24 - Jeff Gordon
5. #22 - Ward Burton
6. #5 - Terry Labonte
7. #2 - Rusty Wallace
8. #55 - Bobby Hamilton
9. #1 - Steve Park
10. #28 - Ricky Rudd

Failed to qualify: Hut Stricklin (#90), Jason Leffler (#01), Carl Long (#85)

- This was Elliott Sadler's first career win and the first for the Wood Brothers Racing team since 1993 with Morgan Shepherd.
- It was also the first time the Wood Brothers #21 and Petty #43 finished 1-2 in a Cup race since 1977, but the first time since 1976 Southern 500 that the #21 finished on top when David Pearson beat Richard Petty. As of 2021, it is the most recent time those two cars have finished in the top two spots.

=== Harrah's 500 ===
The Harrah's 500 was held April 1 at Texas Motor Speedway. Dale Earnhardt Jr. won the pole.

Top Ten Results

1. #88 - Dale Jarrett
2. #1 - Steve Park
3. #10 - Johnny Benson
4. #97 - Kurt Busch
5. #24 - Jeff Gordon
6. #93 - Dave Blaney
7. #29 - Kevin Harvick
8. #8 - Dale Earnhardt Jr.
9. #6 - Mark Martin
10. #36 - Ken Schrader

Failed to qualify: Kyle Petty (#45), Rick Mast (#50)

=== Virginia 500 ===
The Virginia 500 was held April 8 at Martinsville Speedway. Jeff Gordon won the pole.

Top Ten Results

1. #88 - Dale Jarrett*
2. #28 - Ricky Rudd
3. #99 - Jeff Burton
4. #55 - Bobby Hamilton
5. #40 - Sterling Marlin
6. #17 - Matt Kenseth
7. #20 - Tony Stewart
8. #18 - Bobby Labonte
9. #26 - Jimmy Spencer
10. #25 - Jerry Nadeau

Failed to qualify: Jason Leffler (#01), Hermie Sadler (#13), Hut Stricklin (#90)

- This would be the second and final time that Dale Jarrett would score back-to-back victories. The only other time doing that was in 1997 when he won Atlanta and Darlington in the spring.

=== Talladega 500 ===
The Talladega 500 was held April 22 at Talladega Superspeedway. Stacy Compton won the pole.

Top Ten Results

1. #55 - Bobby Hamilton*
2. #20 - Tony Stewart
3. #97 - Kurt Busch
4. #6 - Mark Martin
5. #18 - Bobby Labonte
6. #33 - Joe Nemechek
7. #10 - Johnny Benson
8. #8 - Dale Earnhardt Jr.
9. #7 - Mike Wallace
10. #99 - Jeff Burton

Failed to qualify: Kenny Wallace (#27), Kyle Petty (#45), Rick Mast (#50), Hut Stricklin (#90), Andy Hillenburg (#49)

- This was Bobby Hamilton's fourth and last win in the Cup Series.
- This was the first win for Andy Petree Racing.
- This was the second caution-free race in the history of Talladega Superspeedway, but the aerodynamics package was vastly different than the first caution-free race, which in turn made the average speed (184.003 mph) slower than the track record.
- Stacy Compton won his first Winston Cup Series pole for this race.
- Dale Earnhardt would've made his 656th consecutive start in this race, breaking the Iron Man record held by Terry Labonte. Earnhardt unexpectedly finished his career with 648 consecutive starts. Ricky Rudd would eventually pass Labonte by making his 656th consecutive race the following year in the 2002 Coca-Cola 600. As of 2022, the current Iron Man record stands at 797 starts, currently held by Jeff Gordon.

=== NAPA Auto Parts 500 ===
The NAPA Auto Parts 500 was held April 29 at California Speedway. Bobby Labonte won the pole.

Top Ten Results

1. #2 - Rusty Wallace*
2. #24 - Jeff Gordon
3. #8 - Dale Earnhardt Jr.
4. #20 - Tony Stewart
5. #12 - Jeremy Mayfield
6. #28 - Ricky Rudd
7. #26 - Jimmy Spencer
8. #25 - Jerry Nadeau
9. #40 - Sterling Marlin
10. #77 - Robert Pressley

Failed to qualify: Kevin Lepage (#4), Buckshot Jones (#44), Shawna Robinson (#84)

- This race was held on what would have been Dale Earnhardt's 50th birthday.
- The race marked the 54th career win for Rusty Wallace. With this win, Wallace tied Lee Petty for seventh on NASCAR's all-time win list.
- This was also Wallace's 16th straight season of winning at least one race (1986-2001). The streak would end after 2001, as Wallace did not return to Victory Lane until Martinsville in April 2004, 3 years and 106 races later.

=== Pontiac Excitement 400 ===
The Pontiac Excitement 400 was held May 5 at Richmond International Raceway. Mark Martin won the pole.

Top Ten Results

1. #20 - Tony Stewart
2. #24 - Jeff Gordon
3. #2 - Rusty Wallace
4. #1 - Steve Park
5. #28 - Ricky Rudd
6. #10 - Johnny Benson
7. #8 - Dale Earnhardt Jr.
8. #17 - Matt Kenseth
9. #36 - Ken Schrader
10. #18 - Bobby Labonte

Failed to qualify: Buckshot Jones (#44), Hermie Sadler (#13), Hut Stricklin (#90)

=== The Winston ===
The 2001 edition of The Winston, took place on May 19, 2001, at Lowe's Motor Speedway. Rusty Wallace won the pole.

Top Five Results (Winston Open)

1. #10 - Johnny Benson
2. #28 - Ricky Rudd
3. #32 - Ricky Craven
4. #7 - Mike Wallace
5. #77 - Robert Pressley

Top Five Results (No Bull 5 Sprint)

1. #66 - Todd Bodine
2. #26 - Jimmy Spencer
3. #77 - Robert Pressley
4. #33 - Bobby Hamilton Jr.*
5. #36 - Ken Schrader

Top Ten Results

1. #24 - Jeff Gordon*
2. #88 - Dale Jarrett
3. #20 - Tony Stewart
4. #18 - Bobby Labonte
5. #25 - Jerry Nadeau
6. #22 - Ward Burton
7. #8 - Dale Earnhardt Jr.
8. #66 - Todd Bodine
9. #10 - Johnny Benson Jr.
10. #55 - Bobby Hamilton
- This race became infamous for its chaotic start, as rain showers suddenly developed over the track right after the field took the green flag. This resulted in Jeff Gordon, Kevin Harvick, Jeff Burton, and Michael Waltrip crashing. During the subsequent red flag, NASCAR made the controversial decision to allow all drivers who crashed out to re-enter the race in their backup cars.
- By winning this race, Gordon became the second driver to score three All-Star Race victories, joining Dale Earnhardt.
- This would be the very first running of the Winston that didn't feature Darrell Waltrip and Dale Earnhardt. They both competed in the first 16 events (1985 to 2000).
- Bobby Hamilton Jr. served as a relief driver for Joe Nemechek, as Nemechek was recovering from injuries suffered in a testing accident at Dover. Nemechek would be out until Daytona in July, with Hamilton Jr., Wally Dallenbach Jr., and Scott Pruett reliving him until then.

=== Coca-Cola 600 ===
The Coca-Cola 600 was held May 27 at Lowe's Motor Speedway. Ryan Newman, making his 2nd career Cup start, won the pole.

Top 10 Results

1. #99 - Jeff Burton
2. #29 - Kevin Harvick
3. #20 - Tony Stewart*
4. #6 - Mark Martin
5. #18 - Bobby Labonte
6. #26 - Jimmy Spencer
7. #28 - Ricky Rudd
8. #88 - Dale Jarrett*
9. #22 - Ward Burton
10. #12 - Jeremy Mayfield

Failed to qualify: John Andretti (#43), Kyle Petty (#45), Derrike Cope (#37), Mike Wallace (#7), Jeff Fultz (#54), Carl Long (#85)

- Tony Stewart successfully performed the "Double Duty", also running the Indianapolis 500 the same day; Joe Gibbs Racing had Mike McLaughlin on standby if Stewart did not arrive on time. Stewart arrived less than half an hour before the start of the race. If Stewart did not arrive for the start of the Coca-Cola 600, McLaughlin would have been given credit for the start under NASCAR rules. Stewart had to start at the end of the field (43rd place) due to missing the mandatory drivers' meeting that is held 2 hours before any race. Stewart is also the only driver in history to finish in the top 10 and on the lead lap in both races. He finished sixth in the Indianapolis 500 and finished third in this race.
- Dale Jarrett overcame a rib injury during qualifying to finish 8th. As a precaution, Jeff Green was on standby.
- Even though Ryan Newman won the pole, he finished 43rd after crashing while leading on lap 10.

=== MBNA Platinum 400 ===
The MBNA Platinum 400 was held June 3 at Dover Downs International Speedway. Dale Jarrett won the pole after qualifying was canceled because of rain.

Top Ten Results

1. #24 - Jeff Gordon*
2. #1 - Steve Park
3. #8 - Dale Earnhardt Jr.
4. #32 - Ricky Craven
5. #88 - Dale Jarrett
6. #40 - Sterling Marlin
7. #20 - Tony Stewart
8. #29 - Kevin Harvick
9. #6 - Mark Martin
10. #28 - Ricky Rudd

Failed to qualify: Rick Mast (#50), Jeff Green (#30), Kyle Petty (#45), Lance Hooper (#47), Dave Marcis (#71)

- This was Gordon's 54th career win, tying him with Lee Petty and Rusty Wallace for seventh on NASCAR's all-time wins list. He led 381 of 400 laps.

=== Kmart 400 ===
The Kmart 400 was held June 10 at Michigan International Speedway. Jeff Gordon won the pole.

Top Ten Results

1. #24 - Jeff Gordon*
2. #28 - Ricky Rudd
3. #40 - Sterling Marlin
4. #12 - Jeremy Mayfield
5. #02 - Ryan Newman*
6. #90 - Hut Stricklin*
7. #99 - Jeff Burton
8. #93 - Dave Blaney
9. #9 - Bill Elliott
10. #29 - Kevin Harvick

Failed to qualify: Mike Wallace (#7), Rick Mast (#50), Andy Houston (#96), Stacy Compton (#92), Kenny Wallace (#27)

- Shawna Robinson made her Winston Cup debut in this race, becoming the first woman to successfully attempt a Winston Cup Series race since Patty Moise in 1989. Robinson started 32nd and finished 34th.
- The race marked the first career Top 5 finish for Ryan Newman.
- Hut Stricklin finished a surprising 6th, his last career top-10, and the last top-10 for team owner Junie Donlavey.
- This was the 100th career Winston Cup win for car owner Rick Hendrick and the team of Hendrick Motorsports after being in the sport for 18 seasons since its inception in 1984.
- This was Jeff Gordon's 55th career win, which would permanently pass Lee Petty and Rusty Wallace on NASCAR's all-time win list.

=== Pocono 500 ===
The Pocono 500 was held June 17 at Pocono Raceway. Ricky Rudd won the pole.

Top Ten Results

1. #28 - Ricky Rudd*
2. #24 - Jeff Gordon
3. #88 - Dale Jarrett
4. #40 - Sterling Marlin
5. #6 - Mark Martin
6. #17 - Matt Kenseth
7. #20 - Tony Stewart
8. #18 - Bobby Labonte
9. #36 - Ken Schrader
10. #99 - Jeff Burton

Failed to qualify: Andy Houston (#96), Kenny Wallace (#27)

- This was Ricky Rudd's first win since 1998. This was also the first Cup victory for the Yates Racing #28 since June 1997.
- This was Rudd's first win from the pole in 27 attempts, tying Geoff Bodine for the all-time record for scoring the most poles before scoring his first win from that spot.
- Ricky Rudd scored his first Pocono victory in his 44th attempt. As of 2021, that record stood.

=== Dodge/Save Mart 350 ===
The Dodge/Save Mart 350 was held June 24 at Sears Point Raceway. Jeff Gordon won the pole.

Top Ten Results

1. #20 - Tony Stewart
2. #7 - Robby Gordon*
3. #24 - Jeff Gordon*
4. #28 - Ricky Rudd
5. #2 - Rusty Wallace
6. #22 - Ward Burton
7. #18 - Bobby Labonte
8. #99 - Jeff Burton
9. #9 - Bill Elliott
10. #6 - Mark Martin

Failed to qualify: Andy Houston (#96), Kenny Wallace (#27), Anthony Lazzaro (#68), Jason Leffler (#04)

- Jeff Gordon led the most laps alongside Ron Fellows. Robby Gordon controlled the later stages of the race before relinquishing the lead to Tony Stewart with 11 laps to go; Stewart would go on to win the race.
- This was the first road course win for Tony Stewart.
- Canadian road course ringer Ron Fellows was in contention to win, driving the #87 Chevrolet for Joe Nemechek, leading 20 laps mid-way into the race. Fellows crashed with less than 10 laps to go, ending any chances for an upset win.
- This race marked the career-best finish for Robby Gordon before he later won at Loudon in November 2001.

=== Pepsi 400 ===
The Pepsi 400 was held July 7 at Daytona International Speedway. Sterling Marlin won the pole.

Top Ten Results

1. #8 - Dale Earnhardt Jr.*
2. #15 - Michael Waltrip
3. #21 - Elliott Sadler
4. #22 - Ward Burton
5. #18 - Bobby Labonte
6. #25 - Jerry Nadeau
7. #2 - Rusty Wallace
8. #99 - Jeff Burton
9. #11 - Brett Bodine
10. #7 - Mike Wallace

Failed to qualify: Buckshot Jones (#44), Ron Hornaday Jr. (#14), Hut Stricklin (#90), Mike Bliss (#27), Andy Hillenburg (#49)

- This was the first Winston Cup race at Daytona since the death of Dale Earnhardt.
- This was also the first Cup Series race on NBC under the 2001–2006 contract.
- Dale Earnhardt Jr. led 116 of the race's 160 laps on his way to an emotional victory in what is arguably one of the more memorable races in NASCAR history
- Earnhardt Jr.'s win, coupled with Michael Waltrip pushing him to the victory (the reverse of the finish in Daytona 500) made for an emotional moment. Earnhardt Jr., Waltrip, and their crews, as well as Chocolate Myers, a longtime crew member for Dale Earnhardt, all celebrated in the infield grass on the front stretch. Earnhardt Jr. and Waltrip shared a hug on top of Waltrip's car.

=== Tropicana 400 ===
The inaugural Tropicana 400 was held July 15 at Chicagoland Speedway. Todd Bodine won the pole.

Top Ten Results

1. #29 - Kevin Harvick
2. #77 - Robert Pressley*
3. #28 - Ricky Rudd
4. #88 - Dale Jarrett*
5. #26 - Jimmy Spencer
6. #6 - Mark Martin
7. #17 - Matt Kenseth
8. #97 - Kurt Busch
9. #40 - Sterling Marlin
10. #9 - Bill Elliott

Failed to qualify: Kyle Petty (#45), Dave Marcis (#71), Mike Bliss (#27), Shawna Robinson (#84)

- Early in the race, Mike Skinner suffered a concussion, a broken ankle, and a torn ACL in a hard crash. Skinner would be replaced in the #31 by Robby Gordon for the next four races.
- Jeff Gordon and Dale Jarrett were tied for the points lead after this race.
- 2nd place would be Robert Pressley's best career NASCAR Cup Series finish.

=== New England 300 ===
The New England 300 was held July 22 at New Hampshire International Speedway. Jeff Gordon won the pole.

Top Ten Results

1. #88 - Dale Jarrett*
2. #24 - Jeff Gordon*
3. #28 - Ricky Rudd
4. #26 - Jimmy Spencer
5. #20 - Tony Stewart
6. #1 - Steve Park
7. #18 - Bobby Labonte
8. #29 - Kevin Harvick
9. #8 - Dale Earnhardt Jr.
10. #7 - Mike Wallace

Failed to qualify: Mike Bliss (#27)

- Despite winning the race, Dale Jarrett remained tied for the points lead with Jeff Gordon for the 2nd consecutive week, as Gordon received bonus points for laps led.
- This was the first Winston Cup Series race on TNT under the 2001–2006 contract, although the initial plans were for TBS Superstation to carry the races. Instead, Turner decided that NASCAR would better fit TNT's "We Know Drama" slogan.

=== Pennsylvania 500 ===
The Pennsylvania 500 was held July 29 at Pocono Raceway. Todd Bodine won the pole.

Top Ten Results

1. #18 - Bobby Labonte
2. #8 - Dale Earnhardt Jr.
3. #20 - Tony Stewart
4. #9 - Bill Elliott
5. #10 - Johnny Benson
6. #2 - Rusty Wallace
7. #6 - Mark Martin
8. #24 - Jeff Gordon*
9. #77 - Robert Pressley
10. #32 - Ricky Craven

Failed to qualify: Andy Hillenburg (#49), Carl Long (#85)

- Jeff Gordon took the points to lead from Dale Jarrett in this race and would hold it for the rest of the year.

=== Brickyard 400 ===
The Brickyard 400 was held August 5 at Indianapolis Motor Speedway. Jimmy Spencer won the pole.

Top Ten Results

1. #24 - Jeff Gordon*
2. #40 - Sterling Marlin
3. #10 - Johnny Benson
4. #2 - Rusty Wallace
5. #97 - Kurt Busch
6. #22 - Ward Burton
7. #1 - Steve Park
8. #9 - Bill Elliott
9. #32 - Ricky Craven
10. #8 - Dale Earnhardt Jr.

Failed to qualify: Kevin Lepage (#4), Derrike Cope (#37), Mike Wallace (#7), Hermie Sadler (#13), Ed Berrier (#95), David Keith (#57), Rick Mast (#27), Dave Marcis (#71), Kyle Petty (#45), Shawna Robinson (#84), Andy Hillenburg (#49)

- With the win, Jeff Gordon became the first three-time winner of the Brickyard 400.
- Many top finishers started this race outside the top-25. Jeff Gordon started 27th, Johnny Benson started 26th, Rusty Wallace started 37th, Kurt Busch started 34th, and Dale Earnhardt Jr. started 36th.

=== Global Crossing @ The Glen ===
The Global Crossing @ The Glen was held August 12 at Watkins Glen International. Dale Jarrett won the pole.

Top Ten Results

1. #24 - Jeff Gordon*
2. #99 - Jeff Burton
3. #12 - Jeremy Mayfield
4. #28 - Ricky Rudd
5. #66 - Todd Bodine
6. #25 - Jerry Nadeau
7. #29 - Kevin Harvick
8. #77 - Boris Said*
9. #18 - Bobby Labonte
10. #1 - Steve Park

Failed to qualify: Mike Wallace (#7), Wally Dallenbach Jr. (#44)

- This was Jeff Gordon's 4th Watkins Glen win in the last 5 events. This would also be Gordon's final win at The Glen.
- Jeff Gordon won his seventh career road course race. With this win, Gordon became the all-time NASCAR winner on road courses, breaking out of a 3-way tie with Bobby Allison and Rusty Wallace. Gordon would win an additional 2 more road course races before he retired in 2015, both at Sonoma in 2004 & 2006. As of 2021, Gordon's all-time record still stands with a total of 9 road course wins. Tony Stewart is currently tied with Shane van Gisbergen for 2nd with 8.
- Boris Said was the top-finishing non-regular series driver (road course ringer), as he finished 8th after running as high as third; it was Said's career-best finish at the time, in the #77 Jasper Motorsports Ford.

=== Pepsi 400 presented by Meijer ===
The Pepsi 400 presented by Meijer was held August 19 at Michigan International Speedway. Ricky Craven won the pole. The race was shortened to 162 laps (324 miles) due to rain.

Top Ten Results

1. #40 - Sterling Marlin*
2. #32 - Ricky Craven
3. #9 - Bill Elliott
4. #17 - Matt Kenseth
5. #10 - Johnny Benson
6. #93 - Dave Blaney
7. #24 - Jeff Gordon
8. #6 - Mark Martin
9. #1 - Steve Park
10. #19 - Casey Atwood

Failed to qualify: David Keith (#57), Buckshot Jones (#44)

- This was Marlin's first Cup Series victory since Daytona in July 1996, breaking a 170-race winless streak. Coincidentally, both races were sponsored by Pepsi, and were both rain-shortened.
- This was Dodge's first victory since returning to NASCAR, and their first since Neil Bonnett at Ontario in 1977.

=== Sharpie 500 ===
The Sharpie 500 was held August 25 at Bristol Motor Speedway. Jeff Green won the pole.

Top Ten Results

1. #20 - Tony Stewart
2. #29 - Kevin Harvick
3. #24 - Jeff Gordon
4. #28 - Ricky Rudd
5. #2 - Rusty Wallace
6. #88 - Dale Jarrett
7. #1 - Steve Park
8. #18 - Bobby Labonte
9. #40 - Sterling Marlin
10. #5 - Terry Labonte

Failed to qualify: Stacy Compton (#92), Kyle Petty (#45), Hermie Sadler (#13), Dave Marcis (#71), Hut Stricklin (#90), Carl Long (#85)

=== Mountain Dew Southern 500 ===
The Mountain Dew Southern 500 was held September 2 at Darlington Raceway. Kurt Busch won the pole.

Top Ten Results

1. #22 - Ward Burton*
2. #24 - Jeff Gordon
3. #18 - Bobby Labonte
4. #20 - Tony Stewart
5. #9 - Bill Elliott
6. #99 - Jeff Burton
7. #28 - Ricky Rudd
8. #29 - Kevin Harvick
9. #25 - Jerry Nadeau
10. #36 - Ken Schrader

Failed to qualify: Andy Houston (#96), Dave Marcis (#71)

- Steve Park did not race because of a bizarre accident in the South Carolina 200 (the Busch Grand National Series race) the day before that left him sidelined until early 2002.
- This race ended under caution as a multi-car accident brought out the yellow flag coming to the final lap.
- With this win, brothers Ward and Jeff Burton became the second set of brothers, joining Terry and Bobby Labonte, to win the Southern 500.
- This win marked the second and final time that Ward and Jeff Burton each won a race in the same season.
- Ward Burton winning the Southern 500 in a Dodge, the first Southern 500 win for the manufacturer, and as well as the first win at Darlington since Buddy Baker won in 1971.

=== Chevrolet Monte Carlo 400 ===
The Chevrolet Monte Carlo 400 was held September 8 at Richmond International Raceway. Jeff Gordon won the pole.

Top Ten Results

1. #28 - Ricky Rudd*
2. #29 - Kevin Harvick*
3. #8 - Dale Earnhardt Jr.
4. #88 - Dale Jarrett
5. #2 - Rusty Wallace
6. #18 - Bobby Labonte
7. #20 - Tony Stewart
8. #26 - Jimmy Spencer
9. #99 - Jeff Burton
10. #10 - Johnny Benson

Failed to qualify: Andy Houston (#96), Hermie Sadler (#13), Hut Stricklin (#90), Carl Long (#85)

- This race is remembered for Kevin Harvick almost spinning Ricky Rudd off turn 2 and Rudd saving his car from wrecking and coming back to win after bumping Harvick.
- 2001 marked the final time in his career that Ricky Rudd won multiple races in a season.

=== MBNA Cal Ripken Jr. 400 ===
The MBNA Cal Ripken Jr. 400 was held September 23 at Dover Downs International Speedway. Dale Jarrett won the pole.

Top Ten Results

1. #8 - Dale Earnhardt Jr.
2. #25 - Jerry Nadeau
3. #28 - Ricky Rudd
4. #24 - Jeff Gordon
5. #20 - Tony Stewart
6. #29 - Kevin Harvick
7. #33 - Joe Nemechek
8. #40 - Sterling Marlin
9. #19 - Casey Atwood
10. #55 - Bobby Hamilton

Failed to qualify: Rick Mast (#27), Jason Leffler (#01), Lance Hooper (#47), Dave Marcis (#71)

- This was the first race to be held after the September 11 attacks. Most cars sported patriotic decals and tributes.
- Mike Skinner made his last start in the RCR #31 in this race, as he elected to get surgery to repair his damaged ACL after the injury was aggravated in a crash at Richmond the previous week. The surgery would force him to sit out for the rest of the season.

=== Protection One 400 ===
The inaugural Protection One 400 was held September 30 at Kansas Speedway. Jason Leffler won the pole.

Top Ten Results

1. #24 - Jeff Gordon*
2. #02 - Ryan Newman
3. #28 - Ricky Rudd
4. #2 - Rusty Wallace
5. #40 - Sterling Marlin
6. #6 - Mark Martin
7. #77 - Robert Pressley
8. #20 - Tony Stewart
9. #97 - Kurt Busch
10. #93 - Dave Blaney

Failed to qualify: Rick Mast (#27), Kyle Petty (#45), Ron Hornaday Jr. (#14)

- In 6 of the last 7 years including 2001 (1995-1999, 2001), Jeff Gordon won the most races in a season. 2001 was also the final season in his career that he won the most races in a season.
- This was Jeff Gordon's third win at an inaugural event. He won the inaugural Brickyard 400 in 1994, and the inaugural race at Auto Club Speedway of California in 1997.
- This was the last race for Jeremy Mayfield in the #12 car for Roger Penske. Rusty Wallace's younger brother Mike Wallace would be Rusty's new teammate as he replaced Mayfield for the rest of the season.
- Dale Jarrett suffered a broken rib, bruised shoulder, bruised feet, and a concussion in a hard crash on lap 246. Despite the injuries, Jarrett would not miss any races.

=== UAW-GM Quality 500 ===
The UAW-GM Quality 500 was held October 7 at Lowe's Motor Speedway. Jimmy Spencer won the pole.

Top Ten Results

1. #40 - Sterling Marlin
2. #20 - Tony Stewart
3. #22 - Ward Burton
4. #8 - Dale Earnhardt Jr.
5. #99 - Jeff Burton
6. #88 - Dale Jarrett
7. #2 - Rusty Wallace
8. #29 - Kevin Harvick
9. #6 - Mark Martin
10. #18 - Bobby Labonte

Failed to qualify: Kyle Petty (#45), Derrike Cope (#57), Jeff Green (#30), Robby Gordon (#31), Buckshot Jones (#44), Frank Kimmel (#46)

- This weekend was marred by the death of Blaise Alexander in the ARCA RE/MAX Series support race three days earlier. Four days after the Martinsville race, NASCAR would officially mandate the use of the HANS device for all drivers in response to Alexander's death.
- Jimmie Johnson made his Winston Cup Series debut in this race. Johnson started in the 15th position but finished only 39th due to an accident.
- This race was to have been shown by NBC; however, prior to the race, the telecast was interrupted by an NBC News special report covering President George W. Bush's announcement of Operation Enduring Freedom. Coverage of most of the race was shifted to TNT, while NBC would later re-join the race in simulcast with TNT as it neared completion.

=== Old Dominion 500 ===
The Old Dominion 500 was scheduled for October 14 at Martinsville Speedway, but was held October 15 due to rain. Todd Bodine won the pole.

Top Ten Results

1. #32 - Ricky Craven*
2. #88 - Dale Jarrett
3. #22 - Ward Burton
4. #18 - Bobby Labonte
5. #99 - Jeff Burton
6. #10 - Johnny Benson
7. #6 - Mark Martin
8. #12 - Mike Wallace
9. #24 - Jeff Gordon
10. #40 - Sterling Marlin

Failed to qualify: Carl Long (#85), Kyle Petty (#45), Frank Kimmel (#46)

- This was Ricky Craven's first career Winston Cup Series victory, and the first victory for team owner Cal Wells.
- Kevin Harvick was in contention late in the event until he spun out Bobby Hamilton and NASCAR penalized him one lap for rough driving.
- Rick Mast practiced and qualified Harvick's #29 car, as Harvick was competing in the Busch Series race at Memphis.
- This was the penultimate race in the career of Dave Marcis (he would fail to qualify at Talladega, and Atlanta), he would finish 32nd, completing 493 of 500 laps.

=== EA Sports 500 ===
The EA Sports 500 was held on October 21 at Talladega Superspeedway. Stacy Compton won the pole.

Top Ten Results

1. #8 - Dale Earnhardt Jr.*
2. #20 - Tony Stewart
3. #99 - Jeff Burton
4. #17 - Matt Kenseth
5. #55 - Bobby Hamilton*
6. #1 - Kenny Wallace
7. #24 - Jeff Gordon
8. #33 - Joe Nemechek
9. #6 - Mark Martin
10. #7 - Kevin Lepage

Failed to qualify: Rick Mast (#91), Dave Marcis (#71)

- This race would be remembered for the last lap. After Dale Earnhardt Jr. passed Bobby Labonte for the lead, Labonte tried to block Bobby Hamilton, going up high in turn two. Labonte got loose, making contact with Johnny Benson, causing Labonte to flip over and slide down the back straightaway on his roof, with an additional 14 cars being collected in the wreck. While that happened, Earnhardt Jr., Tony Stewart, and Jeff Burton raced back to the start/finish line. Entering the tri-oval, Earnhardt Jr. sailed away by three car lengths to take his third win of the season while Stewart and Burton battled for the runner-up spot.
- Although he kept the win, Earnhardt Jr. was docked 25 points after his car failed post-race inspection, due to a shortened rear spoiler.
- Earnhardt Jr. had also won the Winston No Bull 5 Million Dollar Bonus for the first time, one year after his father did it in the same race.
- Earnhardt Jr.'s victory was the first of what would be four consecutive Talladega victories for Jr., and the first of five for Dale Earnhardt Inc., lasting until April 2004.
- 2001 marked the first time in seven years that Jeff Gordon did not win a restrictor-plate race.
- Last career top-5 for Bobby Hamilton.

=== Checker Auto Parts 500 presented by Pennzoil ===
The Checker Auto Parts 500 presented by Pennzoil was held October 28 at Phoenix International Raceway. Casey Atwood won the pole.

Top Ten Results

1. #99 - Jeff Burton*
2. #12 - Mike Wallace*
3. #28 - Ricky Rudd
4. #17 - Matt Kenseth
5. #20 - Tony Stewart
6. #24 - Jeff Gordon
7. #31 - Robby Gordon
8. #32 - Ricky Craven
9. #88 - Dale Jarrett
10. #10 - Johnny Benson

Failed to qualify: Rick Bogart (#70)

- Jeff Burton became only the second repeat winner at Phoenix, and also the second driver to win back-to-back Phoenix races, joining Davey Allison, who accomplished the feat in 1991 and 1992. This would also be Burton's last victory in a Cup Series points race until 2006.
- 2nd place would be Mike Wallace's best career NASCAR Cup Series finish.

=== Pop Secret Microwave Popcorn 400 ===
The Pop Secret Microwave Popcorn 400 was held November 4 at North Carolina Speedway. Kenny Wallace won the pole.

Top Ten Results

1. #33 - Joe Nemechek*
2. #1 - Kenny Wallace*
3. #10 - Johnny Benson
4. #88 - Dale Jarrett
5. #25 - Jerry Nadeau
6. #22 - Ward Burton
7. #20 - Tony Stewart
8. #28 - Ricky Rudd
9. #18 - Bobby Labonte
10. #17 - Matt Kenseth

Failed to qualify: Rick Mast (#90)

- The race marked Andy Petree's second and final career win as a car owner.
- This was the 2nd consecutive 2nd-place finish for two Wallace brothers (who are related to Rusty, the oldest and most dominant brother of the three) that have never won a Winston Cup points race (Mike finished 2nd a week prior to Phoenix, and Kenny finishes 2nd in this race).

=== Pennzoil Freedom 400 ===
The Pennzoil Freedom 400 was held on November 11 at Homestead-Miami Speedway. Bill Elliott won the pole.

Top Ten Results

1. #9 - Bill Elliott*
2. #15 - Michael Waltrip
3. #19 - Casey Atwood*
4. #99 - Jeff Burton
5. #40 - Sterling Marlin
6. #93 - Dave Blaney
7. #29 - Kevin Harvick
8. #18 - Bobby Labonte
9. #30 - Jeff Green
10. #01 - Jason Leffler*

Failed to qualify: Rich Bickle (#49), Derrike Cope (#57), Ron Hornaday Jr. (#14), Hermie Sadler (#13), Carl Long (#85)

- Casey Atwood nearly won the race, until a late-race pass by Bill Elliott.
- It was the 41st career Winston Cup Series win for Bill Elliott. This was Elliott's first win in 226 races, dating back to his last win in the Southern 500 at Darlington in 1994. As of 2021, the 226 race winless streak is the longest drought in NASCAR history.
- This was the first race since Richmond back in March 1992 that Bill Elliott won from the pole.
- This would be the first time since Melling Racing and Bill Elliott himself at the Pepsi 400 in 1991, that the #9 went to victory lane.
- The race marked the only top-five finish of Casey Atwood's career, as well as Jason Leffler's only career top-ten finish.
- Jeff Gordon failed to clinch the NASCAR Winston Cup Championship due to finishing in 28th place in this event. He left Homestead with a 305-point lead, and that wasn't enough for him to clinch with 2 races to go. With 2 races to go, he needed to clinch the Championship with a 370+ point lead.
- A pit road incident occurred on lap 112 when Ward Burton and Casey Atwood made contact, knocking Burton's car into Ricky Rudd's pit stall, seriously injuring 2 crew members. In response, NASCAR would institute a new rule mandating helmets for all over-the-wall pit crew members.

=== NAPA 500 ===
The NAPA 500 was held November 18 at Atlanta Motor Speedway. Dale Earnhardt Jr. won the pole.

Top Ten Results

1. #18 - Bobby Labonte
2. #40 - Sterling Marlin
3. #29 - Kevin Harvick
4. #25 - Jerry Nadeau*
5. #22 - Ward Burton
6. #24 - Jeff Gordon*
7. #8 - Dale Earnhardt Jr.
8. #88 - Dale Jarrett
9. #20 - Tony Stewart
10. #99 - Jeff Burton

Failed to qualify: Mark Green (#41), Robby Gordon (#31), Jason Leffler (#01), Kurt Busch (#97), Rick Mast (#90), Ron Hornaday Jr. (#14), Dave Marcis (#71), Frank Kimmel (#46)

- The race was scheduled to be the finale to the 2001 season, but as the fall race in New Hampshire had been postponed due to the attacks of September 11, it became the penultimate race instead.
- Jerry Nadeau nearly won this race, but ran out of gas with half a lap to go, giving way to Bobby Labonte.
- Jeff Gordon clinched the 2001 NASCAR Winston Cup Series Championship with his sixth-place finish, joining Richard Petty and Dale Earnhardt to win four or more NASCAR Championships.
- With this championship win, Jeff Gordon and Dale Earnhardt are the only 2 drivers to win 4 or more titles under the Winston Cup sponsorship. They are also the only 2 drivers in NASCAR history to win 4 or more Championships under one points system, and they both accomplished it in the very same system. They did it in a points system that was created by Bob Latford back in 1975, and ended in 2003. They won a combined total of 11 Championships under the Bob Latford Winston Cup points system (Earnhardt with 7, and Gordon with 4).
- This was the fourth straight season that a driver clinched the NASCAR Winston Cup Championship with one race to go. Jeff Gordon accomplished the feat twice in those four seasons, the first year in 1998, and the fourth year in 2001. Dale Jarrett did it in 1999, and Bobby Labonte did it in 2000.

=== New Hampshire 300 ===
The New Hampshire 300 was scheduled for September 16 but was moved to November 23 (the Friday after Thanksgiving) due to the September 11 terrorist attacks. The starting order was set according to the owner's points as of September 10 meaning new champion Jeff Gordon would start first.

Top Ten Results

1. #31 - Robby Gordon*
2. #40 - Sterling Marlin
3. #18 - Bobby Labonte
4. #17 - Matt Kenseth
5. #20 - Tony Stewart
6. #25 - Jerry Nadeau
7. #77 - Robert Pressley
8. #11 - Brett Bodine
9. #6 - Mark Martin
10. #88 - Dale Jarrett
- 42 cars were entered for this race instead of the traditional 43, as the Eel River Racing Team had folded. This was the last race to feature less than 43 cars until the 2014 Kentucky race. Beginning with the 2016 Sprint Cup season, fields are now a max of 40 cars.
- The win was Robby Gordon's first career victory in the Cup Series and one of only 17 times he raced in 2001 due to having been unexpectedly fired from the Morgan-McClure team after just 5 races. This race was also notable for the battle between Robby and Jeff Gordon (no relation) that led to much bumping between the two and resulting in Jeff Gordon spinning out of the lead, causing the final caution. Jeff was black-flagged for retaliating and after being held a lap by officials, he ended up in 15th place. Robby Gordon held off Sterling Marlin for the win. It would be the #31 team's very first win in NASCAR.
- This was Robby's second oval win in his motorsports career (his first coming in an IndyCar race at Phoenix in 1995), and only oval victory in NASCAR.
- In victory lane, Robby, when asked about the incident with Jeff, said that it was an accident and that he was not embarrassed about his win since he saw Jeff Gordon do something similar to win at a previous race. Robby also donated all his prize money to the victims of the 9/11 attacks.
- Robby Gordon became the 5th driver in 2001 to win his first Winston Cup race, a modern-era record (this record would later be matched the following year in 2002, again in 2011, and most recently in 2022). He also became the 19th different driver to win a race in 2001, another modern-era record.
- As of 2021, Robby Gordon would become the 2nd driver in NASCAR to win a race after failing to qualify the previous week (Dale Jarrett was the first in 1994 when he failed to qualify at North Wilkesboro, and then won the following race at Charlotte).
- This would be the last points race without Ryan Newman and Jimmie Johnson until 2020.

== Drivers' championship ==
(key) Bold - Pole position awarded by time. Italics - Pole position set by owner's points standings. * – Most laps led.

Pos	Driver	DAY	CAR	LVS	ATL	DAR	BRI	TEX	MAR	TAL	CAL	RCH	CLT	DOV	MCH	POC	SON	DAY	CHI	NHA	POC	IND	GLN	MCH	BRI	DAR	RCH	DOV	KAN	CLT	MAR	TAL	PHO	CAR	HOM	ATL	NHA	Points
1	Jeff Gordon	30	**3***	1	2*	40	4	5	**12**	27	2	2	29	1*	**1***	2*	**3***	37	17	**2***	8*	1	1	7	3*	2*	**36**	4	1	16	9	7	6	25	28	6	15*	5112
2	Tony Stewart	36	4	12	27	16	25	23	7	2	4	1	3	7	25	7	1	26	33	5	3	17	26	27	1	4	7	5	8	2	41	2	5	7	19*	9	5	4763
3	Sterling Marlin	7	8	3	35	5	12	34	5	23*	9	11	15	6	3	4	28	**39**	9	17	16	2	25	1	9	16	32	8	5	1*	10	17	34	11	5	2	2	4741
4	Ricky Rudd	4	39	19	6	8	10	37	2	14	6	5	7	10	2	**1**	4	14	3	3	11	39	4	42	4	7	1	3	3	21	39	26	3	8	21	35	13	4706
5	Dale Jarrett	22	10	**2**	**4**	1	16	1*	1	18	24	15	8	5	18	3	26	11	4	1	41	12	**31**	37	6	34	4	**12**	30	6	2	25	9	4	41	8	10	4612
6	Bobby Labonte	40	2	29	33	11	13	42	8	5	**22**	10	5	12	13	8	7	5	39	7	1	15	9	19	8	3	6	36	29	10	4	22	12	9	8	1	3	4561
7	Rusty Wallace	3	7	43	12	10	7	12	13	13	1*	3*	14	21	41	16	5	7	13	43	6	4	43	17	5	22	5*	11	4*	7	15	16	15	24	12	12	18	4481
8	Dale Earnhardt Jr.	2	43	23	15	34	31	**8**	11	8	3	7	25	3	39	20	19	1*	11	9	2	10	12	12	14	17	3	1*	33	4	27	1*	37	15	15	**7***	24	4460
9	Kevin Harvick **(R)**		14	8	1	14	24*	7	34	12	25	17	2	8	10	15	14	25	1*	8	20	11	7	41	2	8	2	6	16	8	22	32	17	27	7	3	26	4406
10	Jeff Burton	19	37	39	30	18	40	19	3	10	31	14	1*	31	7	10	8	8	18	11	36	16	2	16	15	6	9	21	11	5	5	3	1*	18	4	10	17	4394
11	Johnny Benson	28	6	4	7	7	26	3	20	7	11	6	20	41	12	24	29	13	27	36	5	3	16	5	36	14	10	31	37	36	6	23	10	3	20	23	12	4152
12	Mark Martin	33	20	6*	41	21	**34**	9	39	4	40	**13**	4	9	16	5	10	18	6	18	7	22	15	8	37	20	19	32	6	9	7	9	19	34	24	22	9	4095
13	Matt Kenseth	21	28	17	37	19	14	20	6	19	17	8	18	16	15	6	21	16	7	16	14	42	23	4	33	23	35	29	32	12	36	4	4	10	27	17	4	3982
14	Ward Burton	35*	16	21	11	12	5	21	22	33	42	21	9	14	38	40	6	4	20	20	38	6	41	33	12	1	12	33	41	3	3	21	13	6	13	5	42	3846
15	Bill Elliott	**5**	23	14	16	23	17	14	14	32	14	37	26	40	9	27	9	35	10	21	4	8	24	3*	19	5	17	30	40	15	42	20	27	40	**1**	14	22	3824
16	Jimmy Spencer	27	30	10	25	4	19	38	9	36	7	16	6	37	11	17	27	19	5	4	12	**13**	38	11	35	31	8	13	22	**11**	14	43	31	26	18	40	14	3782
17	Jerry Nadeau	32	15	15	3	20	30	29	10	25	8	41	13	38	28	19	31	6	37	33	24	38	6	34	20	9	14	2	12	40	24	35	24	5	33	4	6	3675
18	Bobby Hamilton	8	13	30	22	9	8	18	4*	1	36	28	24	20	22	33	15	38	30	29	29	27	36	28	23	15	13	10	15	31	13	5	36	22	39	27	29	3575
19	Ken Schrader	13	22	25	8	13	35	10	25	40	33	9	21	36	14	9	37	15	29	22	17	28	19	20	22	10	23	18	26	14	11	31	18	19	42	31	39	3480
20	Elliott Sadler	18	11	20	31	17	1	16	21	39	23	23	19	18	40	18	17	3	15	40	26	23	30	15	11	29	31	14	23	37	17	40	33	23	36	24	19	3471
21	Ricky Craven	23	5	41	13	27	23	27	28	15	41	43	31	4	35	43	16	33	21	38	10	9	35	**2**	38	18	11	26	21	35	1*	24	8	12	30	38	38	3379
22	Dave Blaney	42	9	26	34	22	29	6	29	17	29	33	33	33	8	11	32	21	12	37	22	40	28	6	18	19	26	35	10	41	29	30	28	14	6	41	11	3303
23	Terry Labonte	24	29	22	5	38	6	13	23	11	30	38	23	17	26	31	36	40	25	32	34	19	21	29	10	11	38	17	27	27	34	13	20	28	11	32	27	3280
24	Michael Waltrip	1	19	13	23	25	22	39	24	28	43	35	28	43	29	30	20	2	22	28	19	25	18	36	39	36	20	39	38	18	19	37	23	21	2	26	40	3159
25	Robert Pressley	14	12	16	36	15	28	43	40	24	10	32	38	22	21	14		23	2	19	9	35		14	28	38	15	37	7	25	43	27	42	13	40	21	7	3156
26	Casey Atwood **(R)**	20	18	24	DNQ	26	20	36	26	30	39	12	42	29	30	38	41	28	28	12	15	41	22	10	17	25	27	9	43	24	25	39	**14**	20	3	20	16	3132
27	Kurt Busch **(R)**	41	36	11	10	30	42	4	33	3	13	18	12	39	43	13	23	30	8	42	37	5	29	43	25	**39**	24	41	9	22	35	29	22	39	23	DNQ	21	3081
28	Joe Nemechek	11	17	35	17	24	43	41	16	6	20	19						27	16	41	23	20	32	22	24	33	16	7	20	20	23	8	35	1*	31	39	20	2994
29	Todd Bodine	DNQ	34	5	18	33	32	35	43	41	28	30	37	15	42	25	33	12	**14**	15	**43**	24	5	23	32	40	18	15	42	17	**12**	41	29	41	17	16	31	2960
30	Brett Bodine	15	27	38	26	36	27	28	36	26	27	39	17	25	33	37	13	9	19	13	33	37	13	40	26	27	43	28	25	28	40	12	26	35	32	36	8	2948
31	John Andretti	39	21	37	14	6	2	31	35	37	26	34	DNQ	19	37	39	30	22	23	23	27	14	14	26	21	21	30	19	39	26	33	34	39	29	22	25	36	2943
32	Steve Park	31	1	7	43	2*	9	2	19	31	15	4	22	2	23	32	40	20	41	6	13	7	10	9	7	QL												2859
33	Stacy Compton	10	41	27	24	43	11	15	15	**43**	38	29	34	32	DNQ	23	24	32	26	31	32	33	20	21	DNQ	42	22	24	34	32	16	**11**	21	36	43	18	34	2752
34	Mike Wallace	6	40	32	40	32	37	24	31	9	16	25	DNQ	28	DNQ			10		10	25	DNQ	DNQ	35	31	12	42	23	19	34	8	18	2	32	26	13	33	2693
35	Jeremy Mayfield	9	38	42	38	3	3	22	30	35	5	36	10	34	4	36	39	17	32	39	18	18	3	13	16	13	29	42	36									2651
36	Kevin Lepage						15	11	18	42	DNQ	27	35	24	31	21	43	31	34	30	42	DNQ	33	38	13	28	39	16	13	13	21	10	32	16	29	19	35	2461
37	Jason Leffler **(R)**	34	33	28	32	39	DNQ	17	DNQ	20	18	26	30	13	19	41	DNQ	24	24	27	21	26		24	30	43	28	DNQ	**28**	43	37	15	41	30	10	DNQ	30	2413
38	Ron Hornaday Jr. **(R)**	17	25	9	39	42	21	40	27	22	34	31	36	35	32	35	18	DNQ	40	34	30	34	17	30	29	37	41	34	DNQ	38	18	38	30	31	DNQ	DNQ	32	2305
39	Kenny Wallace	25	42	31	29	31	38	25	37	DNQ	37	40	40	27	DNQ	DNQ	DNQ									41	21	22	17	23	20	6	11	**2**	14	28	25	2054
40	Mike Skinner	26	24	18	9	37	18	30	32	29	32	24	11	11	20	12	34	41	42					18	34	24	33	20										2029
41	Buckshot Jones	29	35	36	19	41	33	33	38	16	DNQ	DNQ	27	26	36	42	35	DNQ	38	24	39	36		DNQ	43	35	37	38	31	DNQ	30	28	16	38	34	33	41	1939
42	Hut Stricklin	DNQ	31	40	28	28	DNQ	26	DNQ	DNQ	12	DNQ	16	30	6	28		DNQ	31	35	40	29		32	DNQ	32	DNQ	25	35	30	26	36				11		1770
43	Kyle Petty	16	DNQ	DNQ	42	35	41	DNQ	42	DNQ	35	22	DNQ	DNQ	27	34	22	29	DNQ	26	31	DNQ	39	25	DNQ	26	25	43	DNQ	DNQ	DNQ	33	43	43	16	30	23	1673
44	Robby Gordon	37	26	34	20	29											2		35	25	28	30	40						14	DNQ	38	19	7	37		DNQ	1	1552
45	Rick Mast	DNQ	32	DNQ	DNQ	DNQ	36	DNQ	41	DNQ		20	32	DNQ	DNQ	22		34		14	35	DNQ	27	39	41	30	34	DNQ	DNQ	Wth	QL	DNQ	25	DNQ	38	DNQ	28	1187
46	Andy Houston **(R)**	36	DNQ	DNQ	21	DNQ	39	32	17	21	19	42	41	23	DNQ	DNQ	DNQ	43	43			43		31	40	DNQ	DNQ	40	18								Wth	1123
47	Bobby Hamilton Jr.												39	42	24															33		14	38	17	35	15	37	748
48	Jeff Green										21			DNQ	17				36			21			**42**		40			DNQ					9	34		539
49	Ryan Newman			33									**43**		5							31							2	19			40					497
50	Boris Said																11						8															272
51	Scott Pruett																12						11															262
52	Jimmie Johnson																													39					25	29		210
53	Dave Marcis	DNQ				DNQ				38					DNQ			36	DNQ			DNQ			DNQ	DNQ		DNQ			32	DNQ				DNQ		171
54	Jeff Purvis	43								34								42														42						169
55	Carl Long	DNQ	Wth		DNQ		DNQ						DNQ								DNQ				DNQ		DNQ			29	DNQ			42	DNQ	43		147
56	Rich Bickle																					32									31				DNQ			137
57	Dale Earnhardt	12																																				132
58	Hermie Sadler								DNQ			DNQ										DNQ			DNQ		DNQ	27			28				DNQ	37	DNQ	131
59	Ron Fellows																38						42															96
60	Derrike Cope	DNQ											DNQ									DNQ							24	DNQ					DNQ			91
61	Brian Simo																42						37															89
62	Dorsey Schroeder																25																					88
63	Wally Dallenbach Jr.															26							DNQ															85
64	Ted Musgrave															29																						76
65	Dick Trickle																														QL			33				64
66	Anthony Lazzaro																DNQ						34															61
67	Shawna Robinson										DNQ				34				DNQ			DNQ																61
68	Geoff Bodine																								27										37			52
69	Lance Hooper													DNQ														DNQ								42		37
70	Stuart Kirby																													42								37
71	Norm Benning	DNQ																																				
72	Dwayne Leik	DNQ																																				
73	Morgan Shepherd	DNQ																												Wth							DNQ	
74	Brendan Gaughan			DNQ																																		
75	Andy Hillenburg									DNQ								DNQ			DNQ	DNQ																
76	Jeff Fultz												DNQ																									
77	Mike Bliss																	DNQ	DNQ	DNQ																		
78	Ed Berrier																					DNQ																
79	David Keith																					DNQ		DNQ														
80	Frank Kimmel																													DNQ	DNQ					DNQ		
81	Rick Bogart																																DNQ					
82	Mark Green																																			DNQ		
83	Joe Bessey		Wth																																			
84	Tom Hubert																QL																					
Pos	Driver	DAY	CAR	LVS	ATL	DAR	BRI	TEX	MAR	TAL	CAL	RCH	CLT	DOV	MCH	POC	SON	DAY	CHI	NHA	POC	IND	GLN	MCH	BRI	DAR	RCH	DOV	KAN	CLT	MAR	TAL	PHO	CAR	HOM	ATL	NHA	Points

== Rookie of the Year ==
Kevin Harvick emerged as the victor of the Rookie of the Year battle despite not declaring for the award until the second race of the season, as he took over for Dale Earnhardt following his fatal crash. Harvick won 2 races and finished 9th in points. Kurt Busch finished 2nd, despite only having one year of experience in a major NASCAR series and failing to qualify for one race. 3rd-place finisher Casey Atwood was pre-season favorite, but was held back due to a rough start and only finished 26th in points. Jason Leffler had a sub-par season that cost him his job with Chip Ganassi Racing, and Ron Hornaday Jr. was a disappointment after years of success in the Busch and Truck series. The last-place driver was Andy Houston, another pre-season favorite who had a tough season, suffering from several DNQs and DNFs that resulted in his team closing after the Kansas race.

== Facts ==
- This was the first season under the new television deal with Fox Sports and NBC Sports/Turner Sports. Fox broadcast the season-opening Daytona 500 for the first time and split coverage of the first half of the season with cable partner FX. NBC broadcast the Pepsi 400 at Daytona in July and split-second half the coverage of the season with TNT.
- There were 19 different race winners, a new record for the series.
  - Five of these race winners won a Winston Cup race for the first time: Michael Waltrip in the Daytona 500, Kevin Harvick in the spring Atlanta race, Elliott Sadler in the spring Bristol race, Ricky Craven in the fall Martinsville race, and Robby Gordon in the season finale at New Hampshire.
- There were six first-time pole sitters in the 2001 Winston Cup season: Stacy Compton, Ryan Newman, Kurt Busch, Jason Leffler, Casey Atwood and Jeff Green. Up until Atwood's lead lap finish at Phoenix, the best finish for a first-time pole sitter was Leffler, when he finished 32nd at Kansas. He was on the lead lap with nine to go there, only to wreck. Compton finished 43rd at Talladega, as did Newman at Charlotte. Busch came in 42nd after a crash at Darlington, and Green came in 39th after one in Bristol.
- The 2001 season marked the third full-time Winston Cup season that Mark Martin failed to win a race. His first winless season was in 1982 (his first full-time season), the second in 1996. Martin finished 12th in the final points standings, making this the first time since 1988 that he didn't finish in the Top 10 in points, ending a streak of 12 consecutive seasons.
- Bill Elliott, Sterling Marlin, and Ricky Rudd each won a Winston Cup race for the first time since 1994, 1996, and 1998.
- Jeff Gordon won his fourth Winston Cup Championship, a feat that only two other drivers – Richard Petty and Dale Earnhardt – had accomplished at the time. This was the final championship for Gordon.
- As the 2001 season came to an end, Jeff Gordon's winning average was 20 percent, winning 1 race in every 5 starts. After 2001, he recorded 58 victories in 293 races.
- No rookies competed in all 36 races during this year; the closest were Kevin Harvick, Kurt Busch, and Casey Atwood with 35. Harvick did not compete in the Daytona 500, Atwood did not qualify for the spring Atlanta race, and Busch failed to qualify for the fall race in Atlanta.
- This was supposed to be the last season finale to be held at Atlanta. However, due to the September 11 attacks, the fall New Hampshire race was postponed until the first available date, which came after the Atlanta event.
- Dale Earnhardt was given credit for a 57th-place finish in the final points standings after losing his life on the last lap of the season-opening Daytona 500.
- Dale Earnhardt posthumously won the 2001 NASCAR's Most Popular Driver Award after Bill Elliott withdrew from the award out of respect for Dale.
- 2001 was the last full-time Winston Cup season for Ron Hornaday Jr.; Buckshot Jones, Andy Houston, and Jason Leffler. Hornaday Jr. went to the Busch Grand National Series in 2002 then back to the NASCAR Craftsman Truck Series in 2005. Jones was fired after a few races that same year due to poor finishes. Houston went back to the Trucks Series and currently serves as the spotter for Cole Custer, having previously served as the spotter for Austin Dillon until 2020. Leffler attempted to have a full-time ride with Joe Gibbs Racing in 2005 but was fired halfway into the season. He went back into Grand National from 2006 to 2011 then the Trucks for 2012. After being unemployed in 2013, he died in a sprint car racing accident.
- Future 7-time Cup Series Champion Jimmie Johnson made his NASCAR Winston Cup Series debut for Hendrick Motorsports at the fall race in Charlotte. He would make two more starts during the 2001 season before driving full-time in 2002.
- 2001 was the first season without three-time NASCAR champion Darrell Waltrip since the 1971 season.
- 2001 was the last year for teams Eel River Racing and Melling Racing.
- 2001 was the first year for teams Evernham Motorsports and BAM Racing.
- 2001 was the last season without Greg Biffle and Jamie McMurray until 2017 and 2020 (They would run several races in 2002 before joining as full-time in 2003 until their retirements in 2016 and 2019).
- Until the 2014 Quaker State 400 at Kentucky Speedway, the 2001 New Hampshire 300 was the last race to have 42 starters.
- Last career Top 5 points finishes for Ricky Rudd and Dale Jarrett.
- Last career Top 10 points finish for Sterling Marlin.
- First career Top 10 points finish for Kevin Harvick.
- Kevin Harvick was originally to run a third Childress car #30 America Online Chevy with up to 7 races including his debut at Atlanta in March and full-time in 2002.

== See also ==
- 2001 NASCAR Busch Series
- 2001 NASCAR Craftsman Truck Series
- 2001 ARCA Re/Max Series
- 2001 NASCAR Goody's Dash Series
