= 2001 EA Sports 500 =

31st race of 2001 NASCAR Winston Cup

Race details
- Race 31 of 36 in the 2001 NASCAR Winston Cup Series
- 2001 EA Sports 500 program cover
- Date: October 21, 2001
- Official name: EA Sports 500
- Location: Talladega, Alabama, U.S.
- Course: Talladega Superspeedway
- Course length: 2.66 miles (4.28 km)
- Distance: 188 laps, 500.08 mi (804.801 km)
- Average speed: 164.185 miles per hour (264.230 km/h)

Pole position
Driver	Stacy Compton	Melling Racing
- Time: 50.415 sec (185.24 mph, 298.119 km/h)

Most laps led
Driver	Dale Earnhardt Jr.	Dale Earnhardt, Inc.
- Laps: 67

Winner
No. 8	Dale Earnhardt Jr.	Dale Earnhardt, Inc.

Television in the United States
- Network: NBC
- Announcers: Allen Bestwick, Benny Parsons, Wally Dallenbach Jr.

The 2001 EA Sports 500 was a NASCAR Winston Cup Series race that took place on October 21, 2001, at Talladega Superspeedway in Talladega, Alabama. It was the 31st race of the 2001 NASCAR Winston Cup Series.

== Race report ==
The race is known for its wild finish. Coming out of the tri-oval to the white flag, Dale Earnhardt Jr. attempted to pull to the inside of race leader Bobby Labonte. Instead of going with his Joe Gibbs Racing teammate, Tony Stewart moved down and got behind Dale Jr. and Earnhardt took the lead in turn 1. Bobby Hamilton got a run after a push from Ricky Craven and attempted to pass Labonte but Labonte blocked Hamilton. Out of turn 2, Labonte got hooked by Hamilton in the left rear causing Labonte to spin into Ricky Craven collecting Johnny Benson shooting Labonte back to the right and Labonte went upside down. This would cause the big one on the backstretch collecting as many as 15 cars. In the race back to the line, Dale Earnhardt Jr. would hold off Tony Stewart and Jeff Burton to win the race. This race would be Dale Earnhardt Jr's first of six career wins at Talladega including 4 in a row from this race to the 2003 Aaron's 499.

== Results ==
Fin	St	#	Driver	Make	Laps	Led	Status	Pts
1	6	8	Dale Earnhardt Jr.	Chevrolet	188	67	running	185
2	37	20	Tony Stewart	Pontiac	188	0	running	170
3	33	99	Jeff Burton	Ford	188	4	running	170
4	24	17	Matt Kenseth	Ford	188	3	running	165
5	2	55	Bobby Hamilton	Chevrolet	188	14	running	160
6	15	1	Kenny Wallace	Chevrolet	188	0	running	150
7	11	24	Jeff Gordon	Chevrolet	188	0	running	146
8	9	33	Joe Nemechek	Chevrolet	188	0	running	142
9	14	6	Mark Martin	Ford	188	0	running	138
10	40	7	Kevin Lepage	Ford	188	0	running	134
11	1	92	Stacy Compton	Dodge	188	4	running	135
12	16	11	Brett Bodine	Ford	188	0	running	127
13	20	5	Terry Labonte	Chevrolet	188	0	running	124
14	35	4	Bobby Hamilton Jr.	Chevrolet	188	0	running	121
15	41	01	Jason Leffler	Dodge	188	6	running	123
16	32	2	Rusty Wallace	Ford	188	0	running	115
17	3	40	Sterling Marlin	Dodge	188	4	running	117
18	38	12	Mike Wallace	Ford	188	0	running	109
19	39	31	Robby Gordon	Chevrolet	188	0	running	106
20	5	9	Bill Elliott	Dodge	188	1	running	108
21	18	22	Ward Burton	Dodge	188	0	running	100
22	34	18	Bobby Labonte	Pontiac	187	28	crash	102
23	4	10	Johnny Benson Jr.	Pontiac	187	0	crash	94
24	12	32	Ricky Craven	Ford	187	0	crash	91
25	10	88	Dale Jarrett	Ford	187	1	crash	93
26	23	28	Ricky Rudd	Ford	187	0	crash	85
27	36	77	Robert Pressley	Ford	187	2	crash	87
28	22	44	Buckshot Jones	Dodge	187	0	running	79
29	27	97	Kurt Busch	Ford	187	0	running	76
30	31	93	Dave Blaney	Dodge	187	0	running	73
31	28	36	Ken Schrader	Pontiac	187	0	running	70
32	19	29	Kevin Harvick	Chevrolet	187	0	running	67
33	8	45	Kyle Petty	Dodge	187	0	running	64
34	7	43	John Andretti	Dodge	182	0	running	61
35	29	25	Jerry Nadeau	Chevrolet	175	0	handling	58
36	43	90	Hut Stricklin	Ford	174	0	engine	55
37	30	15	Michael Waltrip	Chevrolet	167	53	overheating	57
38	42	14	Ron Hornaday Jr.	Chevrolet	148	0	transmission	49
39	26	19	Casey Atwood	Dodge	107	0	crash	46
40	17	21	Elliott Sadler	Ford	96	0	crash	43
41	21	66	Todd Bodine	Ford	94	1	crash	45
42	13	51	Jeff Purvis	Ford	86	0	rear end	37
43	25	26	Jimmy Spencer	Ford	18	0	engine	34

Did not qualify: Rick Mast and Dave Marcis
