= 2002 MBNA America 500 =

Fourth race of the 2002 NASCAR Winston Cup Series

Race details
- Race 4 of 36 in the 2002 NASCAR Winston Cup Series
- The 2002 MBNA America 500 program cover, featuring Kevin Harvick, winner of the 2001 race.
- Date: March 10, 2002
- Official name: 44th Annual MBNA America 500
- Location: Hampton, Georgia, Atlanta Motor Speedway
- Course: Permanent racing facility
- Course length: 1.54 miles (2.48 km)
- Distance: 325 laps, 500.5 mi (805.476 km)
- Scheduled distance: 325 laps, 500.5 mi (805.476 km)
- Average speed: 148.443 miles per hour (238.896 km/h)

Pole position
Driver	Bill Elliott	Evernham Motorsports
- Time: 28.944

Most laps led
Driver	Tony Stewart	Joe Gibbs Racing
- Laps: 143

Winner
No. 20	Tony Stewart	Joe Gibbs Racing

Television in the United States
- Network: FOX
- Announcers: Mike Joy, Larry McReynolds, Darrell Waltrip

Radio in the United States
- Radio: Performance Racing Network
- Booth announcers: Chuck Carland, Rob Albright
- Turn announcers: Brett McMillan, Steve Richards, Pat Patterson

The 2002 MBNA America 500 was the fourth stock car race of the 2002 NASCAR Winston Cup Series and the fifth iteration of the event. The race was held on Sunday, March 10, 2002, in Hampton, Georgia at Atlanta Motor Speedway, a 1.54 miles (2.48 km) permanent asphalt quad-oval intermediate speedway. The race took the scheduled 325 laps to complete. Tony Stewart, driving for Joe Gibbs Racing, would pass the worn-out car of Ward Burton with 23 to go to win his 13th career NASCAR Winston Cup Series win and his first of the season. To fill out the podium, Dale Earnhardt Jr. of Dale Earnhardt, Inc. and Jimmie Johnson of Hendrick Motorsports would finish second and third, respectively.

== Background ==
The layout of Atlanta Motor Speedway, the venue where the race was held.

Atlanta Motor Speedway (formerly Atlanta International Raceway) is a track in Hampton, Georgia, 20 miles (32 km) south of Atlanta. It is a 1.54-mile (2.48 km) quad-oval track with a seating capacity of 111,000. It opened in 1960 as a 1.5-mile (2.4 km) standard oval. In 1994, 46 condominiums were built over the northeastern side of the track. In 1997, to standardize the track with Speedway Motorsports' other two 1.5-mile (2.4 km) ovals, the entire track was almost completely rebuilt. The frontstretch and backstretch were swapped, and the configuration of the track was changed from oval to quad-oval. The project made the track one of the fastest on the NASCAR circuit.

=== Entry list ===
#	Driver	Team	Make
1	Kenny Wallace	Dale Earnhardt, Inc.	Chevrolet
2	Rusty Wallace	Penske Racing	Ford
4	Mike Skinner	Morgan–McClure Motorsports	Chevrolet
5	Terry Labonte	Hendrick Motorsports	Chevrolet
6	Mark Martin	Roush Racing	Ford
7	Casey Atwood	Ultra-Evernham Motorsports	Dodge
8	Dale Earnhardt Jr.	Dale Earnhardt, Inc.	Chevrolet
9	Bill Elliott	Evernham Motorsports	Dodge
10	Johnny Benson Jr.	MBV Motorsports	Pontiac
11	Brett Bodine	Brett Bodine Racing	Ford
12	Ryan Newman (R)	Penske Racing	Ford
14	Stacy Compton	A. J. Foyt Enterprises	Pontiac
15	Michael Waltrip	Dale Earnhardt, Inc.	Chevrolet
17	Matt Kenseth	Roush Racing	Ford
18	Bobby Labonte	Joe Gibbs Racing	Pontiac
19	Jeremy Mayfield	Evernham Motorsports	Dodge
20	Tony Stewart	Joe Gibbs Racing	Pontiac
21	Elliott Sadler	Wood Brothers Racing	Ford
22	Ward Burton	Bill Davis Racing	Dodge
23	Hut Stricklin	Bill Davis Racing	Dodge
24	Jeff Gordon	Hendrick Motorsports	Chevrolet
25	Jerry Nadeau	Hendrick Motorsports	Chevrolet
26	Joe Nemechek	Haas-Carter Motorsports	Ford
28	Ricky Rudd	Robert Yates Racing	Ford
29	Kevin Harvick	Richard Childress Racing	Chevrolet
30	Jeff Green	Richard Childress Racing	Chevrolet
31	Robby Gordon	Richard Childress Racing	Chevrolet
32	Ricky Craven	PPI Motorsports	Ford
36	Ken Schrader	MB2 Motorsports	Pontiac
40	Sterling Marlin	Chip Ganassi Racing	Dodge
41	Jimmy Spencer	Chip Ganassi Racing	Dodge
43	John Andretti	Petty Enterprises	Dodge
44	Buckshot Jones	Petty Enterprises	Dodge
45	Kyle Petty	Petty Enterprises	Dodge
48	Jimmie Johnson (R)	Hendrick Motorsports	Chevrolet
49	Shawna Robinson (R)	BAM Racing	Dodge
55	Bobby Hamilton	Andy Petree Racing	Chevrolet
57	Ron Hornaday Jr.	Team CLR	Ford
71	Dick Trickle	Marcis Auto Racing	Chevrolet
77	Dave Blaney	Jasper Motorsports	Ford
85	Carl Long (R)	Mansion Motorsports	Dodge
88	Dale Jarrett	Robert Yates Racing	Ford
90	Rick Mast	Donlavey Racing	Ford
97	Kurt Busch	Roush Racing	Ford
99	Jeff Burton	Roush Racing	Ford
Official entry list

== Practice ==
=== First practice ===
The first practice session was held on Friday, March 8, at 11:20 AM EST, and would last for two hours. Tony Stewart of Joe Gibbs Racing would set the fastest time in the session, with a lap of 29.118 and an average speed of 190.391 miles per hour (306.405 km/h).

Pos.	#	Driver	Team	Make	Time	Speed
1	20	Tony Stewart	Joe Gibbs Racing	Pontiac	29.118	190.391
2	18	Bobby Labonte	Joe Gibbs Racing	Pontiac	29.148	190.201
3	24	Jeff Gordon	Hendrick Motorsports	Chevrolet	29.174	190.026
Full first practice results

=== Second practice ===
The second practice session was held on Saturday, March 9, at 9:30 AM EST, and would last for 45 minutes. Ryan Newman of Penske Racing would set the fastest time in the session, with a lap of 29.896 and an average speed of 185.436 miles per hour (298.430 km/h).

Pos.	#	Driver	Team	Make	Time	Speed
1	12	Ryan Newman (R)	Penske Racing	Ford	29.896	185.436
2	20	Tony Stewart	Joe Gibbs Racing	Pontiac	29.971	184.979
3	24	Jeff Gordon	Hendrick Motorsports	Chevrolet	29.981	184.917
Full second practice results

=== Third and final practice ===
The third and final practice session, sometimes referred to as Happy Hour, was held on Saturday, March 9, at 11:15 AM EST, and would last for 45 minutes. Jerry Nadeau of Hendrick Motorsports would set the fastest time in the session, with a lap of 30.110 and an average speed of 184.125 miles per hour (296.320 km/h).

Pos.	#	Driver	Team	Make	Time	Speed
1	25	Jerry Nadeau	Hendrick Motorsports	Chevrolet	30.110	184.125
2	8	Dale Earnhardt Jr.	Dale Earnhardt, Inc.	Chevrolet	30.115	184.087
3	40	Sterling Marlin	Chip Ganassi Racing	Dodge	30.125	184.026
Full Happy Hour practice results

== Qualifying ==
Qualifying was held on Friday, March 8, at 3:05 PM EST. Each driver would have two laps to set a fastest time; the fastest of the two would count as their official qualifying lap. Positions 1–36 would be decided on time, while positions 37–43 would be based on provisionals. Six spots are awarded by the use of provisionals based on owner's points. The seventh is awarded to a past champion who has not otherwise qualified for the race. If no past champ needs the provisional, the next team in the owner points will be awarded a provisional.

Bill Elliott of Evernham Motorsports would win the pole, setting a time of 28.944 and an average speed of 191.542 miles per hour (308.257 km/h).

Two drivers would fail to qualify: Ron Hornaday Jr. and Carl Long.

=== Full qualifying results ===
Pos.	#	Driver	Team	Make	Time	Speed
1	9	Bill Elliott	Evernham Motorsports	Dodge	28.944	191.542
2	12	Ryan Newman (R)	Penske Racing	Ford	28.955	191.462
3	8	Dale Earnhardt Jr.	Dale Earnhardt, Inc.	Chevrolet	28.975	191.337
4	97	Kurt Busch	Roush Racing	Ford	29.065	190.744
5	41	Jimmy Spencer	Chip Ganassi Racing	Dodge	29.083	190.620
6	32	Ricky Craven	PPI Motorsports	Ford	29.111	190.436
7	88	Dale Jarrett	Robert Yates Racing	Ford	29.124	190.358
8	29	Kevin Harvick	Richard Childress Racing	Chevrolet	29.135	190.286
9	20	Tony Stewart	Joe Gibbs Racing	Pontiac	29.136	190.273
10	10	Johnny Benson Jr.	MBV Motorsports	Pontiac	29.166	190.084
11	1	Kenny Wallace	Dale Earnhardt, Inc.	Chevrolet	29.176	190.019
12	40	Sterling Marlin	Chip Ganassi Racing	Dodge	29.180	189.986
13	5	Terry Labonte	Hendrick Motorsports	Chevrolet	29.180	189.986
14	44	Buckshot Jones	Petty Enterprises	Dodge	29.184	189.960
15	48	Jimmie Johnson (R)	Hendrick Motorsports	Chevrolet	29.184	189.960
16	21	Elliott Sadler	Wood Brothers Racing	Ford	29.187	189.941
17	15	Michael Waltrip	Dale Earnhardt, Inc.	Chevrolet	29.191	189.914
18	18	Bobby Labonte	Joe Gibbs Racing	Pontiac	29.193	189.908
19	24	Jeff Gordon	Hendrick Motorsports	Chevrolet	29.195	189.889
20	43	John Andretti	Petty Enterprises	Dodge	29.245	189.570
21	4	Mike Skinner	Morgan–McClure Motorsports	Chevrolet	29.260	189.473
22	55	Bobby Hamilton	Andy Petree Racing	Chevrolet	29.268	189.415
23	31	Robby Gordon	Richard Childress Racing	Chevrolet	29.270	189.408
24	77	Dave Blaney	Jasper Motorsports	Ford	29.273	189.389
25	36	Ken Schrader	MB2 Motorsports	Pontiac	29.281	189.337
26	25	Jerry Nadeau	Hendrick Motorsports	Chevrolet	29.295	189.240
27	26	Joe Nemechek	Haas-Carter Motorsports	Ford	29.299	189.214
28	22	Ward Burton	Bill Davis Racing	Dodge	29.312	189.137
29	90	Rick Mast	Donlavey Racing	Ford	29.322	189.066
30	99	Jeff Burton	Roush Racing	Ford	29.340	188.957
31	49	Shawna Robinson (R)	BAM Racing	Dodge	29.374	188.738
32	17	Matt Kenseth	Roush Racing	Ford	29.375	188.731
33	23	Hut Stricklin	Bill Davis Racing	Dodge	29.375	188.731
34	45	Kyle Petty	Petty Enterprises	Dodge	29.378	188.706
35	14	Stacy Compton	A. J. Foyt Enterprises	Pontiac	29.379	188.699
36	30	Jeff Green	Richard Childress Racing	Chevrolet	29.381	188.693
Provisionals
37	28	Ricky Rudd	Robert Yates Racing	Ford	29.659	186.924
38	2	Rusty Wallace	Penske Racing	Ford	29.391	188.628
39	6	Mark Martin	Roush Racing	Ford	29.402	188.559
40	19	Jeremy Mayfield	Evernham Motorsports	Dodge	29.393	188.609
41	7	Casey Atwood	Ultra-Evernham Motorsports	Dodge	29.518	187.811
42	11	Brett Bodine	Brett Bodine Racing	Ford	29.426	188.404
43	71	Dick Trickle	Marcis Auto Racing	Chevrolet	29.606	187.259
Failed to qualify
44	57	Ron Hornaday Jr.	Team CLR	Ford	29.521	187.792
45	85	Carl Long (R)	Mansion Motorsports	Dodge	29.665	186.886
Official qualifying results

== Race results ==
Fin	St	#	Driver	Team	Make	Laps	Led	Status	Pts	Winnings
1	9	20	Tony Stewart	Joe Gibbs Racing	Pontiac	325	143	running	185	$174,978
2	3	8	Dale Earnhardt Jr.	Dale Earnhardt, Inc.	Chevrolet	325	38	running	175	$104,600
3	15	48	Jimmie Johnson (R)	Hendrick Motorsports	Chevrolet	325	0	running	165	$72,350
4	32	17	Matt Kenseth	Roush Racing	Ford	325	46	running	165	$91,700
5	6	32	Ricky Craven	PPI Motorsports	Ford	325	0	running	155	$69,950
6	38	2	Rusty Wallace	Penske Racing	Ford	325	0	running	150	$90,625
7	28	22	Ward Burton	Bill Davis Racing	Dodge	325	20	running	151	$90,325
8	39	6	Mark Martin	Roush Racing	Ford	325	0	running	142	$89,833
9	12	40	Sterling Marlin	Chip Ganassi Racing	Dodge	325	0	running	138	$89,117
10	2	12	Ryan Newman (R)	Penske Racing	Ford	325	15	running	139	$78,000
11	4	97	Kurt Busch	Roush Racing	Ford	325	59	running	135	$62,225
12	14	44	Buckshot Jones	Petty Enterprises	Dodge	325	0	running	127	$58,450
13	7	88	Dale Jarrett	Robert Yates Racing	Ford	325	0	running	124	$77,450
14	13	5	Terry Labonte	Hendrick Motorsports	Chevrolet	325	0	running	121	$76,083
15	34	45	Kyle Petty	Petty Enterprises	Dodge	325	2	running	123	$44,500
16	19	24	Jeff Gordon	Hendrick Motorsports	Chevrolet	325	0	running	115	$96,478
17	24	77	Dave Blaney	Jasper Motorsports	Ford	324	2	running	117	$65,200
18	23	31	Robby Gordon	Richard Childress Racing	Chevrolet	324	0	running	109	$72,246
19	16	21	Elliott Sadler	Wood Brothers Racing	Ford	324	0	running	106	$62,279
20	37	28	Ricky Rudd	Robert Yates Racing	Ford	324	0	running	103	$89,157
21	30	99	Jeff Burton	Roush Racing	Ford	324	0	running	100	$86,507
22	11	1	Kenny Wallace	Dale Earnhardt, Inc.	Chevrolet	324	0	running	97	$75,010
23	40	19	Jeremy Mayfield	Evernham Motorsports	Dodge	323	0	running	94	$52,835
24	25	36	Ken Schrader	MB2 Motorsports	Pontiac	323	0	running	91	$52,535
25	27	26	Joe Nemechek	Haas-Carter Motorsports	Ford	322	0	running	88	$69,822
26	5	41	Jimmy Spencer	Chip Ganassi Racing	Dodge	322	0	running	85	$43,985
27	10	10	Johnny Benson Jr.	MBV Motorsports	Pontiac	322	0	running	82	$51,670
28	21	4	Mike Skinner	Morgan–McClure Motorsports	Chevrolet	321	0	running	79	$43,420
29	22	55	Bobby Hamilton	Andy Petree Racing	Chevrolet	320	0	running	76	$51,110
30	26	25	Jerry Nadeau	Hendrick Motorsports	Chevrolet	320	0	running	73	$51,385
31	35	14	Stacy Compton	A. J. Foyt Enterprises	Pontiac	320	0	running	70	$42,810
32	41	7	Casey Atwood	Ultra-Evernham Motorsports	Dodge	319	0	running	67	$42,235
33	29	90	Rick Mast	Donlavey Racing	Ford	318	0	running	64	$39,670
34	31	49	Shawna Robinson (R)	BAM Racing	Dodge	310	0	running	61	$39,625
35	1	9	Bill Elliott	Evernham Motorsports	Dodge	288	0	crash	58	$72,146
36	20	43	John Andretti	Petty Enterprises	Dodge	288	0	crash	55	$66,638
37	18	18	Bobby Labonte	Joe Gibbs Racing	Pontiac	287	0	running	52	$85,298
38	42	11	Brett Bodine	Brett Bodine Racing	Ford	276	0	engine	49	$39,475
39	8	29	Kevin Harvick	Richard Childress Racing	Chevrolet	254	0	engine	46	$85,218
40	17	15	Michael Waltrip	Dale Earnhardt, Inc.	Chevrolet	204	0	engine	43	$47,380
41	36	30	Jeff Green	Richard Childress Racing	Chevrolet	187	0	engine	40	$39,345
42	43	71	Dick Trickle	Marcis Auto Racing	Chevrolet	178	0	crash	37	$39,305
43	33	23	Hut Stricklin	Bill Davis Racing	Dodge	164	0	engine	34	$38,605
Official race results

Previous race: 2002 UAW-DaimlerChrysler 400	NASCAR Winston Cup Series; 2002 season	Next race: 2002 Carolina Dodge Dealers 400
