= 2002 Pepsi 400 =

17th race of the 2002 NASCAR Winston Cup Series

Race details
- Race 17 of 36 in the 2002 NASCAR Winston Cup Series
- The 2002 Pepsi 400 program cover.
- Date: July 6, 2002
- Official name: 44th Annual Pepsi 400
- Location: Daytona Beach, Florida, Daytona International Speedway
- Course: Permanent racing facility
- Course length: 2.5 miles (4.0 km)
- Distance: 160 laps, 400 mi (643.737 km)
- Scheduled distance: 160 laps, 400 mi (643.737 km)
- Average speed: 135.952 miles per hour (218.794 km/h)

Pole position
Driver	Kevin Harvick	Richard Childress Racing
- Time: 48.638

Most laps led
Driver	Michael Waltrip	Dale Earnhardt, Inc.
- Laps: 99

Winner
No. 15	Michael Waltrip	Dale Earnhardt, Inc.

Television in the United States
- Network: FOX
- Announcers: Mike Joy, Larry McReynolds, Darrell Waltrip

Radio in the United States
- Radio: Motor Racing Network

The 2002 Pepsi 400 was the 17th stock car race of the 2002 NASCAR Winston Cup Series and the 44th iteration of the event. The race was held on Saturday, July 6, 2002, in Daytona Beach, Florida at Daytona International Speedway, a 2.5 miles (4.0 km) permanent triangular-shaped superspeedway. The race took the scheduled 160 laps to complete. At race's end, Michael Waltrip, driving for Dale Earnhardt, Inc., would win a crash-marred race under caution, a decision that would prove controversial with fans, as they wanted the race to finish under green. To fill out the podium, Rusty Wallace of Penske Racing and Sterling Marlin of Chip Ganassi Racing would finish second and third, respectively.

== Background ==
The layout of Daytona International Speedway, the venue where the race was held.

Daytona International Speedway is one of three superspeedways to hold NASCAR races, the other two being Indianapolis Motor Speedway and Talladega Superspeedway. The standard track at Daytona International Speedway is a four-turn superspeedway that is 2.5 miles (4.0 km) long. The track's turns are banked at 31 degrees, while the front stretch, the location of the finish line, is banked at 18 degrees.

=== Entry list ===
- (R) denotes rookie driver.

#	Driver	Team	Make
1	Steve Park	Dale Earnhardt, Inc.	Chevrolet
2	Rusty Wallace	Penske Racing	Ford
4	Mike Skinner	Morgan–McClure Motorsports	Chevrolet
5	Terry Labonte	Hendrick Motorsports	Chevrolet
6	Mark Martin	Roush Racing	Ford
7	Casey Atwood	Ultra-Evernham Motorsports	Dodge
8	Dale Earnhardt Jr.	Dale Earnhardt, Inc.	Chevrolet
9	Bill Elliott	Evernham Motorsports	Dodge
09	Geoff Bodine	Phoenix Racing	Ford
10	Johnny Benson Jr.	MBV Motorsports	Pontiac
11	Brett Bodine	Brett Bodine Racing	Ford
12	Ryan Newman (R)	Penske Racing	Ford
14	Stacy Compton	A. J. Foyt Enterprises	Pontiac
15	Michael Waltrip	Dale Earnhardt, Inc.	Chevrolet
17	Matt Kenseth	Roush Racing	Ford
18	Bobby Labonte	Joe Gibbs Racing	Pontiac
19	Jeremy Mayfield	Evernham Motorsports	Dodge
20	Tony Stewart	Joe Gibbs Racing	Pontiac
21	Elliott Sadler	Wood Brothers Racing	Ford
22	Ward Burton	Bill Davis Racing	Dodge
23	Hut Stricklin	Bill Davis Racing	Dodge
24	Jeff Gordon	Hendrick Motorsports	Chevrolet
25	Joe Nemechek	Hendrick Motorsports	Chevrolet
26	Todd Bodine	Haas-Carter Motorsports	Ford
28	Ricky Rudd	Robert Yates Racing	Ford
29	Kevin Harvick	Richard Childress Racing	Chevrolet
30	Jeff Green	Richard Childress Racing	Chevrolet
31	Robby Gordon	Richard Childress Racing	Chevrolet
32	Ricky Craven	PPI Motorsports	Ford
33	Mike Wallace	Andy Petree Racing	Chevrolet
36	Ken Schrader	MB2 Motorsports	Pontiac
40	Sterling Marlin	Chip Ganassi Racing	Dodge
41	Jimmy Spencer	Chip Ganassi Racing	Dodge
43	John Andretti	Petty Enterprises	Dodge
44	Steve Grissom	Petty Enterprises	Dodge
45	Kyle Petty	Petty Enterprises	Dodge
48	Jimmie Johnson (R)	Hendrick Motorsports	Chevrolet
49	Shawna Robinson (R)	BAM Racing	Dodge
55	Bobby Hamilton	Andy Petree Racing	Chevrolet
77	Dave Blaney	Jasper Motorsports	Ford
88	Dale Jarrett	Robert Yates Racing	Ford
90	Ed Berrier	Donlavey Racing	Ford
97	Kurt Busch	Roush Racing	Ford
98	Kenny Wallace	Innovative Motorsports	Chevrolet
99	Jeff Burton	Roush Racing	Ford
Official entry list

== Practice ==
Originally, three practice sessions were scheduled to be held, with one on Thursday and two on Saturday. However, rain on Thursday would add a one-hour additional practice session to Thursday's sessions, and rain on Friday would cancel both sessions, leaving only two sessions run on Thursday.

=== First practice ===
Originally scheduled as a two-hour practice session, the first practice session was held on Thursday, July 4, at 3:00 PM EST, but would only last for 40 minutes due to rain. Michael Waltrip of Dale Earnhardt, Inc. would set the fastest time in the session, with a lap of 48.876 and an average speed of 184.139 miles per hour (296.343 km/h).

Pos.	#	Driver	Team	Make	Time	Speed
1	15	Michael Waltrip	Dale Earnhardt, Inc.	Chevrolet	48.876	184.139
2	88	Dale Jarrett	Robert Yates Racing	Ford	48.933	183.925
3	09	Geoff Bodine	Phoenix Racing	Ford	48.994	183.696
Full first practice results

=== Final practice ===
The final practice session was held on Thursday, July 4, at 8:00 PM EST, and would last for one hour. Dale Jarrett of Robert Yates Racing would set the fastest time in the session, with a lap of 48.598 and an average speed of 185.193 miles per hour (298.039 km/h).

Pos.	#	Driver	Team	Make	Time	Speed
1	88	Dale Jarrett	Robert Yates Racing	Ford	48.598	185.193
2	15	Michael Waltrip	Dale Earnhardt, Inc.	Chevrolet	48.832	184.305
3	40	Sterling Marlin	Chip Ganassi Racing	Dodge	48.845	184.256
Full Final practice results

== Qualifying ==
Qualifying was held on Friday, July 5, at 10:00 PM EST after rain delayed qualifying from its original date, July 4. Each driver would have two laps to set a fastest time; the fastest of the two would count as their official qualifying lap. Positions 1-36 would be decided on time, while positions 37-43 would be based on provisionals. Six spots are awarded by the use of provisionals based on owner's points. The seventh is awarded to a past champion who has not otherwise qualified for the race. If no past champ needs the provisional, the next team in the owner points will be awarded a provisional.

Kevin Harvick of Richard Childress Racing would win the pole, setting a time of 48.638 and an average speed of 185.040 miles per hour (297.793 km/h).

Two drivers would fail to qualify: Ed Berrier and Steve Grissom.

=== Full qualifying results ===
Pos.	#	Driver	Team	Make	Time	Speed
1	29	Kevin Harvick	Richard Childress Racing	Chevrolet	48.638	185.040
2	09	Geoff Bodine	Phoenix Racing	Ford	48.814	184.373
3	24	Jeff Gordon	Hendrick Motorsports	Chevrolet	48.841	184.271
4	31	Robby Gordon	Richard Childress Racing	Chevrolet	48.842	184.268
5	88	Dale Jarrett	Robert Yates Racing	Ford	48.848	184.245
6	10	Johnny Benson Jr.	MBV Motorsports	Pontiac	48.943	183.887
7	15	Michael Waltrip	Dale Earnhardt, Inc.	Chevrolet	48.976	183.764
8	1	Steve Park	Dale Earnhardt, Inc.	Chevrolet	48.985	183.730
9	8	Dale Earnhardt Jr.	Dale Earnhardt, Inc.	Chevrolet	49.043	183.512
10	7	Casey Atwood	Ultra-Evernham Motorsports	Dodge	49.103	183.288
11	55	Bobby Hamilton	Andy Petree Racing	Chevrolet	49.119	183.229
12	28	Ricky Rudd	Robert Yates Racing	Ford	49.140	183.150
13	33	Mike Wallace	Andy Petree Racing	Chevrolet	49.163	183.064
14	9	Bill Elliott	Evernham Motorsports	Dodge	49.191	182.960
15	98	Kenny Wallace	Innovative Motorsports	Chevrolet	49.245	182.760
16	48	Jimmie Johnson (R)	Hendrick Motorsports	Chevrolet	49.252	182.734
17	11	Brett Bodine	Brett Bodine Racing	Ford	49.284	182.615
18	6	Mark Martin	Roush Racing	Ford	49.319	182.486
19	36	Ken Schrader	MB2 Motorsports	Pontiac	49.335	182.426
20	40	Sterling Marlin	Chip Ganassi Racing	Dodge	49.356	182.349
21	18	Bobby Labonte	Joe Gibbs Racing	Pontiac	49.385	182.242
22	45	Kyle Petty	Petty Enterprises	Dodge	49.431	182.072
23	4	Mike Skinner	Morgan–McClure Motorsports	Chevrolet	49.476	181.906
24	26	Todd Bodine	Haas-Carter Motorsports	Ford	49.482	181.884
25	41	Jimmy Spencer	Chip Ganassi Racing	Dodge	49.504	181.803
26	32	Ricky Craven	PPI Motorsports	Ford	49.511	181.778
27	49	Shawna Robinson (R)	BAM Racing	Dodge	49.533	181.697
28	97	Kurt Busch	Roush Racing	Ford	49.560	181.598
29	20	Tony Stewart	Joe Gibbs Racing	Pontiac	49.582	181.518
30	77	Dave Blaney	Jasper Motorsports	Ford	49.584	181.510
31	21	Elliott Sadler	Wood Brothers Racing	Ford	49.600	181.452
32	43	John Andretti	Petty Enterprises	Dodge	49.610	181.415
33	14	Stacy Compton	A. J. Foyt Enterprises	Pontiac	49.611	181.411
34	23	Hut Stricklin	Bill Davis Racing	Dodge	49.644	181.291
35	99	Jeff Burton	Roush Racing	Ford	49.649	181.273
36	5	Terry Labonte	Hendrick Motorsports	Chevrolet	49.704	181.072
Provisionals
37	2	Rusty Wallace	Penske Racing	Ford	49.706	181.065
38	17	Matt Kenseth	Roush Racing	Ford	49.801	180.719
39	12	Ryan Newman (R)	Penske Racing	Ford	49.786	180.774
40	30	Jeff Green	Richard Childress Racing	Chevrolet	50.465	178.341
41	22	Ward Burton	Bill Davis Racing	Dodge	49.734	180.963
42	19	Jeremy Mayfield	Evernham Motorsports	Dodge	49.756	180.883
43	25	Joe Nemechek	Hendrick Motorsports	Chevrolet	49.709	181.054
Failed to qualify
44	90	Ed Berrier	Donlavey Racing	Ford	49.826	180.629
45	44	Steve Grissom	Petty Enterprises	Dodge	—	—
Official qualifying results

== Race ==
Pole sitter Kevin Harvick led the first lap of the race. The first caution did not take long as it came out on lap 2 when Tony Stewart crashed on the backstretch. Kevin Harvick led the field to the restart on lap 7. The second caution flew on lap 9 when Johnny Benson crashed in turn 3 after contact from Ken Schrader. On the restart on lap 14, Jeff Gordon took the lead from Harvick. The third caution flew on lap 17 when Mike Wallace got turned by Steve Park in the tri-oval. Jeff Burton stayed out on pit road and he was the race leader. The competition caution flew on lap 25. Before they took the green flag for the restart, Jeff Gordon came down pit road due to speculation that Gordon had a flat tire. Gordon ended up going a lap down. The race restarted on lap 30. On lap 43, Sterling Marlin took the lead from Jeff Burton. On lap 59, the 5th caution flew when Kenny Wallace crashed in turn 4. Michael Waltrip won the race off of pit road and he was the new race leader on the restart on lap 64. Green flag pit stops began on lap 114. Dale Earnhardt Jr. led when Waltrip pitted on lap 118. On lap 119, Michael Waltrip got his lead back. With 35 laps to go, the 6th caution flew when Tony Stewart spun off of turn 2.

=== Final laps ===
The race restarted with 30 laps to go in the race. With 25 laps to go, the big one struck heading into turn 1 taking out 14 cars. It started when Jeff Burton hooked Dale Jarrett in the left rear which caused Jarrett to turn left then turn his car back to the right, right in front of a pack of cars. During the wreck, Joe Nemechek got hooked by the spinning Jarrett and spun into Burton. Nemechek's car went up the racetrack and pounded the outside wall head on in turn 1. Also, Mike Skinner spun in the wreck and went up in front of Brett Bodine destroying Bodine's front end and catching Bodine's car on fire. After the hard hit into the outside wall, Nemechek would walk away but suffered a bruised left foot. The cars involved were Dale Jarrett, Jeff Burton, Brett Bodine, Jeremy Mayfield, Mike Skinner, Bobby Labonte, Joe Nemechek, Steve Park, Matt Kenseth, Terry Labonte, Ricky Rudd, Jimmie Johnson, Geoff Bodine, and Kyle Petty. The race restarted with 16 laps to go and Michael Waltrip led over his DEI teammate Dale Earnhardt Jr. With 11 laps to go, the 8th caution flew for debris in turn 2. The race restarted with 6 laps to go and Michael Waltrip kept his lead. With 4 laps to go, the 9th and final caution flew for a 3 car crash on the backstretch involving Ryan Newman, Jeff Green, and Dave Blaney. Dale Earnhardt Jr. fell back from 2nd to 6th when the caution came out. In the previous years' race, Jr. restarted 6th with 6 laps to go in the race and powered his way up to the lead in 2 laps and won that race. The fans thought it could happen again and wanted NASCAR to red flag the race so they could get back going again. But NASCAR decided to keep the caution flag in the air and the race ended up finishing under caution and Michael Waltrip took home his second win of his Cup Series career. Rusty Wallace, Sterling Marlin, Jimmy Spencer, and Mark Martin rounded out the top 5 while Dale Earnhardt Jr., Todd Bodine, Jimmie Johnson, Ward Burton, and Geoff Bodine rounded out the top 10. Frustrated with NASCAR's decision, fans on the backstretch threw lawn chairs, beer bottles, and a bunch of garbage onto the racetrack after Waltrip took the checkered flag.

== Race results ==
Fin	St	#	Driver	Team	Make	Laps	Led	Status	Pts	Winnings
1	7	15	Michael Waltrip	Dale Earnhardt, Inc.	Chevrolet	160	99	running	185	$172,975
2	37	2	Rusty Wallace	Penske Racing	Ford	160	0	running	170	$151,350
3	20	40	Sterling Marlin	Chip Ganassi Racing	Dodge	160	18	running	170	$158,292
4	25	41	Jimmy Spencer	Chip Ganassi Racing	Dodge	160	0	running	160	$109,575
5	18	6	Mark Martin	Roush Racing	Ford	160	0	running	155	$117,883
6	9	8	Dale Earnhardt Jr.	Dale Earnhardt, Inc.	Chevrolet	160	1	running	155	$105,537
7	24	26	Todd Bodine	Haas-Carter Motorsports	Ford	160	0	running	146	$98,737
8	16	48	Jimmie Johnson (R)	Hendrick Motorsports	Chevrolet	160	0	running	117	$65,225
9	41	22	Ward Burton	Bill Davis Racing	Dodge	160	0	running	138	$111,275
10	2	09	Geoff Bodine	Phoenix Racing	Ford	160	0	running	134	$66,875
11	1	29	Kevin Harvick	Richard Childress Racing	Chevrolet	160	13	running	135	$112,253
12	31	21	Elliott Sadler	Wood Brothers Racing	Ford	160	0	running	127	$87,925
13	42	19	Jeremy Mayfield	Evernham Motorsports	Dodge	160	0	running	124	$72,300
14	36	5	Terry Labonte	Hendrick Motorsports	Chevrolet	160	0	running	121	$92,683
15	12	28	Ricky Rudd	Robert Yates Racing	Ford	160	0	running	118	$106,117
16	11	55	Bobby Hamilton	Andy Petree Racing	Chevrolet	160	0	running	115	$84,575
17	14	9	Bill Elliott	Evernham Motorsports	Dodge	160	0	running	112	$88,631
18	33	14	Stacy Compton	A. J. Foyt Enterprises	Pontiac	160	0	running	109	$62,150
19	22	45	Kyle Petty	Petty Enterprises	Dodge	160	0	running	106	$58,000
20	10	7	Casey Atwood	Ultra-Evernham Motorsports	Dodge	160	0	running	103	$74,700
21	40	30	Jeff Green	Richard Childress Racing	Chevrolet	160	0	running	100	$57,325
22	3	24	Jeff Gordon	Hendrick Motorsports	Chevrolet	159	6	running	102	$110,578
23	26	32	Ricky Craven	PPI Motorsports	Ford	159	0	running	94	$68,325
24	32	43	John Andretti	Petty Enterprises	Dodge	159	0	running	91	$87,058
25	19	36	Ken Schrader	MB2 Motorsports	Pontiac	158	0	running	88	$76,414
26	34	23	Hut Stricklin	Bill Davis Racing	Dodge	158	0	running	85	$67,275
27	39	12	Ryan Newman (R)	Penske Racing	Ford	156	0	crash	82	$66,925
28	30	77	Dave Blaney	Jasper Motorsports	Ford	156	0	crash	79	$66,600
29	4	31	Robby Gordon	Richard Childress Racing	Chevrolet	156	0	running	76	$84,431
30	38	17	Matt Kenseth	Roush Racing	Ford	154	0	running	73	$73,700
31	28	97	Kurt Busch	Roush Racing	Ford	153	0	running	70	$66,025
32	21	18	Bobby Labonte	Joe Gibbs Racing	Pontiac	150	0	running	67	$101,178
33	35	99	Jeff Burton	Roush Racing	Ford	146	23	crash	69	$99,917
34	8	1	Steve Park	Dale Earnhardt, Inc.	Chevrolet	138	0	crash	61	$85,000
35	5	88	Dale Jarrett	Robert Yates Racing	Ford	135	0	crash	58	$102,778
36	43	25	Joe Nemechek	Hendrick Motorsports	Chevrolet	135	0	crash	55	$62,850
37	23	4	Mike Skinner	Morgan–McClure Motorsports	Chevrolet	135	0	crash	52	$54,725
38	17	11	Brett Bodine	Brett Bodine Racing	Ford	135	0	crash	49	$54,575
39	29	20	Tony Stewart	Joe Gibbs Racing	Pontiac	111	0	crash	46	$102,038
40	27	49	Shawna Robinson (R)	BAM Racing	Dodge	110	0	rear end	43	$54,310
41	13	33	Mike Wallace	Andy Petree Racing	Chevrolet	83	0	handling	40	$74,455
42	15	98	Kenny Wallace	Innovative Motorsports	Chevrolet	57	0	crash	37	$54,060
43	6	10	Johnny Benson Jr.	MBV Motorsports	Pontiac	8	0	crash	34	$80,699
Official race results

Previous race: 2002 Dodge/Save Mart 350	NASCAR Winston Cup Series; 2002 season	Next race: 2002 Tropicana 400
