= 2002 Tropicana 400 =

18th race of the 2002 NASCAR Winston Cup Series

Race details
- Race 18 of 36 in the 2002 NASCAR Winston Cup Series
- The 2002 Tropicana 400 program cover.
- Date: July 14, 2002
- Official name: 2nd Annual Tropicana 400
- Location: Chicagoland Speedway, Joliet, Illinois
- Course: Permanent racing facility
- Course length: 1.5 miles (2.41 km)
- Distance: 267 laps, 400.5 mi (644.542 km)
- Scheduled distance: 267 laps, 400.5 mi (644.542 km)
- Average speed: 136.832 miles per hour (220.210 km/h)

Pole position
Driver	Ryan Newman	Penske Racing
- Time: 29.500

Most laps led
Driver	Ryan Newman	Penske Racing
- Laps: 87

Winner
No. 29	Kevin Harvick	Richard Childress Racing

Television in the United States
- Network: NBC
- Announcers: Allen Bestwick, Benny Parsons, Wally Dallenbach Jr.

Radio in the United States
- Radio: Motor Racing Network

The 2002 Tropicana 400 was the 18th stock car race of the 2002 NASCAR Winston Cup Series and the second iteration of the event. The race was held on Sunday, July 14, 2002, in Joliet, Illinois, at Chicagoland Speedway, a 1.5 miles (2.41 km) tri-oval speedway. The race took the scheduled 267 laps to complete. At race's end, Kevin Harvick, driving for Richard Childress Racing, would stretch out a fuel run and climb through the field to win his third career NASCAR Winston Cup Series win and his first and only win of the season. To fill out the podium, Jeff Gordon of Hendrick Motorsports and Tony Stewart of Joe Gibbs Racing would finish second and third, respectively.

== Background ==
The layout of Chicagoland Speedway, the venue where the race was held.

Chicagoland Speedway is a 1.5 miles (2.41 km) tri-oval speedway in Joliet, Illinois, southwest of Chicago. The speedway opened in 2001 and currently hosts NASCAR racing. Until 2011, the speedway also hosted the IndyCar Series, recording numerous close finishes including the closest finish in IndyCar history. The speedway is owned and operated by International Speedway Corporation and located adjacent to Route 66 Raceway.

=== Entry list ===
- (R) denotes rookie driver.

#	Driver	Team	Make
00	Jerry Nadeau	Michael Waltrip Racing	Chevrolet
1	Steve Park	Dale Earnhardt, Inc.	Chevrolet
2	Rusty Wallace	Penske Racing	Ford
4	Mike Skinner	Morgan–McClure Motorsports	Chevrolet
5	Terry Labonte	Hendrick Motorsports	Chevrolet
6	Mark Martin	Roush Racing	Ford
7	Casey Atwood	Ultra-Evernham Motorsports	Dodge
8	Dale Earnhardt Jr.	Dale Earnhardt, Inc.	Chevrolet
9	Bill Elliott	Evernham Motorsports	Dodge
10	Mike Wallace	MBV Motorsports	Pontiac
11	Brett Bodine	Brett Bodine Racing	Ford
12	Ryan Newman (R)	Penske Racing	Ford
14	Stacy Compton	A. J. Foyt Enterprises	Pontiac
15	Michael Waltrip	Dale Earnhardt, Inc.	Chevrolet
17	Matt Kenseth	Roush Racing	Ford
18	Bobby Labonte	Joe Gibbs Racing	Pontiac
19	Jeremy Mayfield	Evernham Motorsports	Dodge
20	Tony Stewart	Joe Gibbs Racing	Pontiac
21	Elliott Sadler	Wood Brothers Racing	Ford
22	Ward Burton	Bill Davis Racing	Dodge
23	Hut Stricklin	Bill Davis Racing	Dodge
24	Jeff Gordon	Hendrick Motorsports	Chevrolet
25	Joe Nemechek	Hendrick Motorsports	Chevrolet
26	Todd Bodine	Haas-Carter Motorsports	Ford
27	Scott Wimmer	Bill Davis Racing	Dodge
28	Ricky Rudd	Robert Yates Racing	Ford
29	Kevin Harvick	Richard Childress Racing	Chevrolet
30	Jeff Green	Richard Childress Racing	Chevrolet
31	Robby Gordon	Richard Childress Racing	Chevrolet
32	Ricky Craven	PPI Motorsports	Ford
36	Ken Schrader	MB2 Motorsports	Pontiac
40	Sterling Marlin	Chip Ganassi Racing	Dodge
41	Jimmy Spencer	Chip Ganassi Racing	Dodge
43	John Andretti	Petty Enterprises	Dodge
44	Steve Grissom	Petty Enterprises	Dodge
45	Kyle Petty	Petty Enterprises	Dodge
48	Jimmie Johnson (R)	Hendrick Motorsports	Chevrolet
49	Ron Hornaday Jr.	BAM Racing	Dodge
55	Bobby Hamilton	Andy Petree Racing	Chevrolet
57	Stuart Kirby	Team CLR	Ford
72	Kirk Shelmerdine	Kirk Shelmerdine Racing	Ford
74	Tony Raines	BACE Motorsports	Chevrolet
77	Dave Blaney	Jasper Motorsports	Ford
88	Dale Jarrett	Robert Yates Racing	Ford
97	Kurt Busch	Roush Racing	Ford
98	Kenny Wallace	Innovative Motorsports	Chevrolet
99	Jeff Burton	Roush Racing	Ford
Official entry list

== Practice ==
=== First practice ===
The first practice session was held on Friday, July 12, at 11:20 AM CST, and would last for 2 hours. Joe Nemechek of Hendrick Motorsports would set the fastest time in the session, with a lap of 29.467 and an average speed of 183.256 miles per hour (294.922 km/h).

Pos.	#	Driver	Team	Make	Time	Speed
1	25	Joe Nemechek	Hendrick Motorsports	Chevrolet	29.467	183.256
2	12	Ryan Newman (R)	Penske Racing	Ford	29.564	182.655
3	97	Kurt Busch	Roush Racing	Ford	29.663	182.045
Full first practice results

=== Second practice ===
The second practice session was held on Saturday, July 13, at 10:15 AM CST, and would last for 45 minutes. Ryan Newman of Penske Racing would set the fastest time in the session, with a lap of 30.071 and an average speed of 179.575 miles per hour (288.998 km/h).

Pos.	#	Driver	Team	Make	Time	Speed
1	12	Ryan Newman (R)	Penske Racing	Ford	30.071	179.575
2	8	Dale Earnhardt Jr.	Dale Earnhardt, Inc.	Chevrolet	30.285	178.306
3	25	Joe Nemechek	Hendrick Motorsports	Chevrolet	30.299	178.224
Full second practice results

=== Final practice ===
The final practice session was held on Saturday, July 13, at 11:15 AM CST, and would last for 45 minutes. Dale Earnhardt Jr. of Dale Earnhardt, Inc. would set the fastest time in the session, with a lap of 30.364 and an average speed of 177.842 miles per hour (286.209 km/h).

Pos.	#	Driver	Team	Make	Time	Speed
1	8	Dale Earnhardt Jr.	Dale Earnhardt, Inc.	Chevrolet	30.364	177.842
2	12	Ryan Newman (R)	Penske Racing	Ford	30.438	177.410
3	40	Sterling Marlin	Chip Ganassi Racing	Dodge	30.491	177.101
Full Final practice results

== Qualifying ==
Qualifying was held on Friday, July 12, at 3:05 PM CST. Each driver would have two laps to set a fastest time; the fastest of the two would count as their official qualifying lap. Positions 1-36 would be decided on time, while positions 37-43 would be based on provisionals. Six spots are awarded by the use of provisionals based on owner's points. The seventh is awarded to a past champion who has not otherwise qualified for the race. If no past champ needs the provisional, the next team in the owner points will be awarded a provisional.

Ryan Newman of Penske Racing would win the pole, setting a time of 29.500 and an average speed of 183.051 miles per hour (294.592 km/h).

Four drivers would fail to qualify: Ron Hornaday Jr., Kirk Shelmerdine, Tony Raines, and Scott Wimmer.

=== Full qualifying results ===
Pos.	#	Driver	Team	Make	Time	Speed
1	12	Ryan Newman (R)	Penske Racing	Ford	29.500	183.051
2	97	Kurt Busch	Roush Racing	Ford	29.574	182.593
3	9	Bill Elliott	Evernham Motorsports	Dodge	29.597	182.451
4	40	Sterling Marlin	Chip Ganassi Racing	Dodge	29.639	182.192
5	15	Michael Waltrip	Dale Earnhardt, Inc.	Chevrolet	29.678	181.953
6	20	Tony Stewart	Joe Gibbs Racing	Pontiac	29.733	181.616
7	77	Dave Blaney	Jasper Motorsports	Ford	29.741	181.568
8	2	Rusty Wallace	Penske Racing	Ford	29.747	181.531
9	8	Dale Earnhardt Jr.	Dale Earnhardt, Inc.	Chevrolet	29.757	181.470
10	25	Joe Nemechek	Hendrick Motorsports	Chevrolet	29.776	181.354
11	88	Dale Jarrett	Robert Yates Racing	Ford	29.793	181.251
12	18	Bobby Labonte	Joe Gibbs Racing	Pontiac	29.793	181.251
13	6	Mark Martin	Roush Racing	Ford	29.794	181.245
14	26	Todd Bodine	Haas-Carter Motorsports	Ford	29.802	181.196
15	24	Jeff Gordon	Hendrick Motorsports	Chevrolet	29.806	181.172
16	17	Matt Kenseth	Roush Racing	Ford	29.868	180.796
17	4	Mike Skinner	Morgan–McClure Motorsports	Chevrolet	29.873	180.765
18	99	Jeff Burton	Roush Racing	Ford	29.876	180.747
19	21	Elliott Sadler	Wood Brothers Racing	Ford	29.897	180.620
20	19	Jeremy Mayfield	Evernham Motorsports	Dodge	29.908	180.554
21	31	Robby Gordon	Richard Childress Racing	Chevrolet	29.909	180.548
22	1	Steve Park	Dale Earnhardt, Inc.	Chevrolet	29.915	180.511
23	11	Brett Bodine	Brett Bodine Racing	Ford	29.917	180.499
24	5	Terry Labonte	Hendrick Motorsports	Chevrolet	29.923	180.463
25	32	Ricky Craven	PPI Motorsports	Ford	29.949	180.307
26	57	Stuart Kirby	Team CLR	Ford	29.951	180.294
27	36	Ken Schrader	MB2 Motorsports	Pontiac	29.961	180.234
28	98	Kenny Wallace	Innovative Motorsports	Chevrolet	29.978	180.132
29	23	Hut Stricklin	Bill Davis Racing	Dodge	29.986	180.084
30	43	John Andretti	Petty Enterprises	Dodge	29.998	180.012
31	22	Ward Burton	Bill Davis Racing	Dodge	30.019	179.886
32	29	Kevin Harvick	Richard Childress Racing	Chevrolet	30.032	179.808
33	30	Jeff Green	Richard Childress Racing	Chevrolet	30.055	179.671
34	00	Jerry Nadeau	Michael Waltrip Racing	Chevrolet	30.058	179.653
35	45	Kyle Petty	Petty Enterprises	Dodge	30.093	179.444
36	10	Mike Wallace	MBV Motorsports	Pontiac	30.110	179.342
Provisionals
37	48	Jimmie Johnson (R)	Hendrick Motorsports	Chevrolet	30.329	178.047
38	28	Ricky Rudd	Robert Yates Racing	Ford	30.290	178.277
39	41	Jimmy Spencer	Chip Ganassi Racing	Dodge	30.137	179.182
40	55	Bobby Hamilton	Andy Petree Racing	Chevrolet	30.908	174.712
41	7	Casey Atwood	Ultra-Evernham Motorsports	Dodge	30.361	177.860
42	44	Steve Grissom	Petty Enterprises	Dodge	30.784	175.416
43	14	Stacy Compton	A. J. Foyt Enterprises	Pontiac	30.121	179.277
Failed to qualify
44	49	Ron Hornaday Jr.	BAM Racing	Dodge	30.195	178.838
45	72	Kirk Shelmerdine	Kirk Shelmerdine Racing	Ford	30.196	178.832
46	74	Tony Raines	BACE Motorsports	Chevrolet	30.269	178.400
47	27	Scott Wimmer	Bill Davis Racing	Dodge	30.332	178.030
Official qualifying results

== Race results ==
Fin	#	Driver	Team	Make	Laps	Led	Status	Pts	Winnings
1	29	Kevin Harvick	Richard Childress Racing	Chevrolet	267	29	running	180	$200,028
2	24	Jeff Gordon	Hendrick Motorsports	Chevrolet	267	0	running	170	$180,268
3	20	Tony Stewart	Joe Gibbs Racing	Pontiac	267	35	running	170	$153,928
4	48	Jimmie Johnson (R)	Hendrick Motorsports	Chevrolet	267	2	running	165	$88,175
5	12	Ryan Newman (R)	Penske Racing	Ford	267	87	running	165	$115,725
6	97	Kurt Busch	Roush Racing	Ford	267	0	running	150	$85,000
7	9	Bill Elliott	Evernham Motorsports	Dodge	267	0	running	146	$95,556
8	31	Robby Gordon	Richard Childress Racing	Chevrolet	267	0	running	142	$93,956
9	6	Mark Martin	Roush Racing	Ford	267	13	running	143	$100,133
10	8	Dale Earnhardt Jr.	Dale Earnhardt, Inc.	Chevrolet	267	81	running	139	$102,437
11	88	Dale Jarrett	Robert Yates Racing	Ford	267	9	running	110	$109,878
12	30	Jeff Green	Richard Childress Racing	Chevrolet	267	2	running	132	$59,100
13	5	Terry Labonte	Hendrick Motorsports	Chevrolet	267	0	running	124	$91,033
14	17	Matt Kenseth	Roush Racing	Ford	267	3	running	126	$75,800
15	55	Bobby Hamilton	Andy Petree Racing	Chevrolet	267	0	running	118	$88,100
16	40	Sterling Marlin	Chip Ganassi Racing	Dodge	266	0	running	115	$100,867
17	77	Dave Blaney	Jasper Motorsports	Ford	266	0	running	112	$82,200
18	18	Bobby Labonte	Joe Gibbs Racing	Pontiac	266	0	running	109	$102,778
19	28	Ricky Rudd	Robert Yates Racing	Ford	266	0	running	106	$101,217
20	32	Ricky Craven	PPI Motorsports	Ford	266	0	running	103	$71,850
21	21	Elliott Sadler	Wood Brothers Racing	Ford	266	5	running	105	$78,600
22	43	John Andretti	Petty Enterprises	Dodge	266	0	running	97	$86,883
23	4	Mike Skinner	Morgan–McClure Motorsports	Chevrolet	266	0	running	94	$67,889
24	45	Kyle Petty	Petty Enterprises	Dodge	266	0	running	91	$55,800
25	2	Rusty Wallace	Penske Racing	Ford	266	0	running	88	$99,850
26	26	Todd Bodine	Haas-Carter Motorsports	Ford	265	0	running	85	$84,387
27	1	Steve Park	Dale Earnhardt, Inc.	Chevrolet	265	0	running	82	$88,375
28	7	Casey Atwood	Ultra-Evernham Motorsports	Dodge	264	0	running	79	$58,200
29	98	Kenny Wallace	Innovative Motorsports	Chevrolet	263	0	running	76	$54,800
30	11	Brett Bodine	Brett Bodine Racing	Ford	262	0	running	73	$58,200
31	44	Steve Grissom	Petty Enterprises	Dodge	262	0	running	70	$54,900
32	41	Jimmy Spencer	Chip Ganassi Racing	Dodge	239	0	running	67	$57,700
33	25	Joe Nemechek	Hendrick Motorsports	Chevrolet	237	0	crash	64	$65,500
34	19	Jeremy Mayfield	Evernham Motorsports	Dodge	234	0	running	61	$64,800
35	14	Stacy Compton	A. J. Foyt Enterprises	Pontiac	230	0	engine	58	$54,050
36	23	Hut Stricklin	Bill Davis Racing	Dodge	218	0	crash	55	$61,800
37	00	Jerry Nadeau	Michael Waltrip Racing	Chevrolet	217	0	steering	52	$53,600
38	10	Mike Wallace	MBV Motorsports	Pontiac	172	0	engine	49	$80,150
39	99	Jeff Burton	Roush Racing	Ford	167	0	engine	46	$97,867
40	36	Ken Schrader	MB2 Motorsports	Pontiac	151	0	engine	43	$61,000
41	22	Ward Burton	Bill Davis Racing	Dodge	137	0	handling	40	$95,800
42	15	Michael Waltrip	Dale Earnhardt, Inc.	Chevrolet	136	1	crash	42	$60,600
43	57	Stuart Kirby	Team CLR	Ford	124	0	rear end	34	$52,403
Official race results

Previous race: 2002 Pepsi 400	NASCAR Winston Cup Series; 2002 season	Next race: 2002 New England 300
