= 2002 Carolina Dodge Dealers 400 =

Fifth race of the 2002 NASCAR Winston Cup Series

Race details
- Race 5 of 36 in the 2002 NASCAR Winston Cup Series
- The 2002 Carolina Dodge Dealers 400 program cover, featuring Dale Jarrett, winner of the 2001 race.
- Date: March 17, 2002
- Official name: 46th Annual Carolina Dodge Dealers 400
- Location: Darlington, South Carolina, Darlington Raceway
- Course: Permanent racing facility
- Course length: 1.366 miles (2.198 km)
- Distance: 293 laps, 400.238 mi (644.12 km)
- Scheduled distance: 293 laps, 400.238 mi (644.12 km)
- Average speed: 126.07 miles per hour (202.89 km/h)

Pole position
| Driver | Ricky Craven | PPI Motorsports |
- Time: 28.912

Most laps led
| Driver | Jeff Gordon | Hendrick Motorsports |
- Laps: 176

Winner
| No. 40 | Sterling Marlin | Chip Ganassi Racing |

Television in the United States
- Network: FOX
- Announcers: Mike Joy, Larry McReynolds, Darrell Waltrip

Radio in the United States
- Radio: Motor Racing Network
- Booth announcers: Barney Hall, Joe Moore
- Turn announcers: Mike Bagley, Dave Moody

The 2002 Carolina Dodge Dealers 400 was the fifth stock car race of the 2002 NASCAR Winston Cup Series and the 46th iteration of the event. The race was held on Sunday, March 17, 2002, in Darlington, South Carolina, at Darlington Raceway, a 1.366 miles (2.198 km) permanent egg-shaped oval racetrack. The race took the scheduled 293 laps to complete. At race's end, Sterling Marlin, driving for Chip Ganassi Racing, would come back from the back of the pack near the end of the race to win his 10th and final career NASCAR Winston Cup Series win and his first of the season. To fill out the podium, Elliott Sadler of Wood Brothers Racing and Kevin Harvick of Richard Childress Racing would finish second and third, respectively.

== Background ==
The layout of Darlington Raceway, the venue where the race was held.

Darlington Raceway is a race track built for NASCAR racing located near Darlington, South Carolina. It is nicknamed "The Lady in Black" and "The Track Too Tough to Tame" by many NASCAR fans and drivers and advertised as "A NASCAR Tradition." It is of a unique, somewhat egg-shaped design, an oval with the ends of very different configurations, a condition which supposedly arose from the proximity of one end of the track to a minnow pond the owner refused to relocate. This situation makes it very challenging for the crews to set up their cars' handling in a way that is effective at both ends.

=== Entry list ===
- (R) denotes rookie driver.

| # | Driver | Team | Make |
|---|---|---|---|
| 1 | Steve Park | Dale Earnhardt, Inc. | Chevrolet |
| 2 | Rusty Wallace | Penske Racing | Ford |
| 4 | Mike Skinner | Morgan–McClure Motorsports | Chevrolet |
| 5 | Terry Labonte | Hendrick Motorsports | Chevrolet |
| 6 | Mark Martin | Roush Racing | Ford |
| 7 | Casey Atwood | Ultra-Evernham Motorsports | Dodge |
| 8 | Dale Earnhardt Jr. | Dale Earnhardt, Inc. | Chevrolet |
| 9 | Bill Elliott | Evernham Motorsports | Dodge |
| 10 | Johnny Benson Jr. | MBV Motorsports | Pontiac |
| 11 | Brett Bodine | Brett Bodine Racing | Ford |
| 12 | Ryan Newman (R) | Penske Racing | Ford |
| 14 | Stacy Compton | A. J. Foyt Enterprises | Pontiac |
| 15 | Michael Waltrip | Dale Earnhardt, Inc. | Chevrolet |
| 17 | Matt Kenseth | Roush Racing | Ford |
| 18 | Bobby Labonte | Joe Gibbs Racing | Pontiac |
| 19 | Jeremy Mayfield | Evernham Motorsports | Dodge |
| 20 | Tony Stewart | Joe Gibbs Racing | Pontiac |
| 21 | Elliott Sadler | Wood Brothers Racing | Ford |
| 22 | Ward Burton | Bill Davis Racing | Dodge |
| 23 | Hut Stricklin | Bill Davis Racing | Dodge |
| 24 | Jeff Gordon | Hendrick Motorsports | Chevrolet |
| 25 | Jerry Nadeau | Hendrick Motorsports | Chevrolet |
| 26 | Joe Nemechek | Haas-Carter Motorsports | Ford |
| 28 | Ricky Rudd | Robert Yates Racing | Ford |
| 29 | Kevin Harvick | Richard Childress Racing | Chevrolet |
| 30 | Jeff Green | Richard Childress Racing | Chevrolet |
| 31 | Robby Gordon | Richard Childress Racing | Chevrolet |
| 32 | Ricky Craven | PPI Motorsports | Ford |
| 36 | Ken Schrader | MB2 Motorsports | Pontiac |
| 40 | Sterling Marlin | Chip Ganassi Racing | Dodge |
| 41 | Jimmy Spencer | Chip Ganassi Racing | Dodge |
| 43 | John Andretti | Petty Enterprises | Dodge |
| 44 | Buckshot Jones | Petty Enterprises | Dodge |
| 45 | Kyle Petty | Petty Enterprises | Dodge |
| 48 | Jimmie Johnson (R) | Hendrick Motorsports | Chevrolet |
| 49 | Shawna Robinson (R) | BAM Racing | Dodge |
| 55 | Bobby Hamilton | Andy Petree Racing | Chevrolet |
| 71 | Andy Hillenburg | Marcis Auto Racing | Chevrolet |
| 77 | Dave Blaney | Jasper Motorsports | Ford |
| 88 | Dale Jarrett | Robert Yates Racing | Ford |
| 90 | Rick Mast | Donlavey Racing | Ford |
| 97 | Kurt Busch | Roush Racing | Ford |
| 99 | Jeff Burton | Roush Racing | Ford |
Official entry list

== Practice ==
=== First practice ===
The first practice session was held on Friday, March 15, at 10:20 AM EST, and would last for two hours. Jimmie Johnson of Hendrick Motorsports would set the fastest time in the session, with a lap of 29.145 and an average speed of 168.723 miles per hour (271.533 km/h).

| Pos. | # | Driver | Team | Make | Time | Speed |
|---|---|---|---|---|---|---|
| 1 | 48 | Jimmie Johnson (R) | Hendrick Motorsports | Chevrolet | 29.145 | 168.723 |
| 2 | 36 | Ken Schrader | MB2 Motorsports | Pontiac | 29.166 | 168.602 |
| 3 | 1 | Steve Park | Dale Earnhardt, Inc. | Chevrolet | 29.200 | 168.410 |
Full first practice results

=== Second practice ===
The second practice session was held on Saturday, March 16, at 9:30 AM EST, and would last for 45 minutes. Ryan Newman of Penske Racing would set the fastest time in the session, with a lap of 29.527 and an average speed of 166.539 miles per hour (268.019 km/h).

| Pos. | # | Driver | Team | Make | Time | Speed |
|---|---|---|---|---|---|---|
| 1 | 12 | Ryan Newman (R) | Penske Racing | Ford | 29.527 | 166.539 |
| 2 | 40 | Sterling Marlin | Chip Ganassi Racing | Dodge | 30.000 | 163.919 |
| 3 | 99 | Jeff Burton | Roush Racing | Ford | 30.135 | 163.186 |
Full second practice results

=== Third and final practice ===
The third and final practice session, sometimes referred to as Happy Hour, was held on Saturday, March 16, at 11:15 AM EST, and would last for 45 minutes. Sterling Marlin of Chip Ganassi Racing would set the fastest time in the session, with a lap of 30.246 and an average speed of 162.580 miles per hour (261.647 km/h).

| Pos. | # | Driver | Team | Make | Time | Speed |
|---|---|---|---|---|---|---|
| 1 | 40 | Sterling Marlin | Chip Ganassi Racing | Dodge | 30.246 | 162.580 |
| 2 | 8 | Dale Earnhardt Jr. | Dale Earnhardt, Inc. | Chevrolet | 30.378 | 161.880 |
| 3 | 55 | Bobby Hamilton | Andy Petree Racing | Chevrolet | 30.440 | 161.544 |
Full Happy Hour practice results

== Qualifying ==
Qualifying was held on Friday, March 15, at 2:05 PM EST. Each driver would have two laps to set a fastest time; the fastest of the two would count as their official qualifying lap. Positions 1-36 would be decided on time, while positions 37-43 would be based on provisionals. Six spots are awarded by the use of provisionals based on owner's points. The seventh is awarded to a past champion who has not otherwise qualified for the race. If no past champ needs the provisional, the next team in the owner points will be awarded a provisional.

Ricky Craven of PPI Motorsports would win the pole, setting a time of 28.912 and an average speed of 170.089 miles per hour (273.732 km/h).

No drivers would fail to qualify.

=== Full qualifying results ===
| Pos. | # | Driver | Team | Make | Time | Speed |
|---|---|---|---|---|---|---|
| 1 | 32 | Ricky Craven | PPI Motorsports | Ford | 28.912 | 170.089 |
| 2 | 24 | Jeff Gordon | Hendrick Motorsports | Chevrolet | 28.915 | 170.071 |
| 3 | 12 | Ryan Newman (R) | Penske Racing | Ford | 28.945 | 169.895 |
| 4 | 1 | Steve Park | Dale Earnhardt, Inc. | Chevrolet | 29.038 | 169.351 |
| 5 | 48 | Jimmie Johnson (R) | Hendrick Motorsports | Chevrolet | 29.061 | 169.217 |
| 6 | 21 | Elliott Sadler | Wood Brothers Racing | Ford | 29.078 | 169.117 |
| 7 | 41 | Jimmy Spencer | Chip Ganassi Racing | Dodge | 29.100 | 168.990 |
| 8 | 36 | Ken Schrader | MB2 Motorsports | Pontiac | 29.122 | 168.862 |
| 9 | 30 | Jeff Green | Richard Childress Racing | Chevrolet | 29.133 | 168.798 |
| 10 | 9 | Bill Elliott | Evernham Motorsports | Dodge | 29.142 | 168.746 |
| 11 | 40 | Sterling Marlin | Chip Ganassi Racing | Dodge | 29.154 | 168.677 |
| 12 | 18 | Bobby Labonte | Joe Gibbs Racing | Pontiac | 29.167 | 168.602 |
| 13 | 97 | Kurt Busch | Roush Racing | Ford | 29.171 | 168.578 |
| 14 | 99 | Jeff Burton | Roush Racing | Ford | 29.179 | 168.532 |
| 15 | 22 | Ward Burton | Bill Davis Racing | Dodge | 29.180 | 168.526 |
| 16 | 29 | Kevin Harvick | Richard Childress Racing | Chevrolet | 29.183 | 168.509 |
| 17 | 15 | Michael Waltrip | Dale Earnhardt, Inc. | Chevrolet | 29.185 | 168.497 |
| 18 | 2 | Rusty Wallace | Penske Racing | Ford | 29.205 | 168.382 |
| 19 | 19 | Jeremy Mayfield | Evernham Motorsports | Dodge | 29.206 | 168.376 |
| 20 | 25 | Jerry Nadeau | Hendrick Motorsports | Chevrolet | 29.283 | 167.934 |
| 21 | 28 | Ricky Rudd | Robert Yates Racing | Ford | 29.295 | 167.865 |
| 22 | 88 | Dale Jarrett | Robert Yates Racing | Ford | 29.297 | 167.853 |
| 23 | 8 | Dale Earnhardt Jr. | Dale Earnhardt, Inc. | Chevrolet | 29.304 | 167.813 |
| 24 | 10 | Johnny Benson Jr. | MBV Motorsports | Pontiac | 29.310 | 167.779 |
| 25 | 77 | Dave Blaney | Jasper Motorsports | Ford | 29.331 | 167.659 |
| 26 | 55 | Bobby Hamilton | Andy Petree Racing | Chevrolet | 29.340 | 167.607 |
| 27 | 26 | Joe Nemechek | Haas-Carter Motorsports | Ford | 29.347 | 167.567 |
| 28 | 31 | Robby Gordon | Richard Childress Racing | Chevrolet | 29.359 | 167.499 |
| 29 | 4 | Mike Skinner | Morgan–McClure Motorsports | Chevrolet | 29.363 | 167.476 |
| 30 | 45 | Kyle Petty | Petty Enterprises | Dodge | 29.383 | 167.362 |
| 31 | 6 | Mark Martin | Roush Racing | Ford | 29.396 | 167.288 |
| 32 | 14 | Stacy Compton | A. J. Foyt Enterprises | Pontiac | 29.396 | 167.288 |
| 33 | 11 | Brett Bodine | Brett Bodine Racing | Ford | 29.398 | 167.277 |
| 34 | 17 | Matt Kenseth | Roush Racing | Ford | 29.415 | 167.180 |
| 35 | 43 | John Andretti | Petty Enterprises | Dodge | 29.415 | 167.180 |
| 36 | 20 | Tony Stewart | Joe Gibbs Racing | Pontiac | 29.467 | 166.885 |
Provisionals
| 37 | 5 | Terry Labonte | Hendrick Motorsports | Chevrolet | 29.558 | 166.371 |
| 38 | 44 | Buckshot Jones | Petty Enterprises | Dodge | 29.529 | 166.535 |
| 39 | 23 | Hut Stricklin | Bill Davis Racing | Dodge | 29.579 | 166.253 |
| 40 | 7 | Casey Atwood | Ultra-Evernham Motorsports | Dodge | 29.701 | 165.570 |
| 41 | 90 | Rick Mast | Donlavey Racing | Ford | 29.595 | 166.163 |
| 42 | 49 | Shawna Robinson (R) | BAM Racing | Dodge | 31.800 | 154.641 |
| 43 | 71 | Andy Hillenburg | Marcis Auto Racing | Chevrolet | 31.647 | 155.389 |
Official qualifying results

== Race results ==
| Fin. | St | # | Driver | Team | Make | Laps | Led | Status | Pts | Winnings |
|---|---|---|---|---|---|---|---|---|---|---|
| 1 | 11 | 40 | Sterling Marlin | Chip Ganassi Racing | Dodge | 293 | 57 | running | 180 | $190,642 |
| 2 | 6 | 21 | Elliott Sadler | Wood Brothers Racing | Ford | 293 | 0 | running | 170 | $98,395 |
| 3 | 16 | 29 | Kevin Harvick | Richard Childress Racing | Chevrolet | 293 | 0 | running | 165 | $10,443 |
| 4 | 23 | 8 | Dale Earnhardt Jr. | Dale Earnhardt, Inc. | Chevrolet | 293 | 10 | running | 165 | $96,542 |
| 5 | 3 | 12 | Ryan Newman (R) | Penske Racing | Ford | 293 | 0 | running | 155 | $77,175 |
| 6 | 5 | 48 | Jimmie Johnson (R) | Hendrick Motorsports | Chevrolet | 293 | 0 | running | 150 | $48,900 |
| 7 | 18 | 2 | Rusty Wallace | Penske Racing | Ford | 293 | 0 | running | 146 | $88,520 |
| 8 | 34 | 17 | Matt Kenseth | Roush Racing | Ford | 293 | 0 | running | 142 | $70,365 |
| 9 | 2 | 24 | Jeff Gordon | Hendrick Motorsports | Chevrolet | 293 | 176 | running | 148 | $106,663 |
| 10 | 10 | 9 | Bill Elliott | Evernham Motorsports | Dodge | 293 | 0 | running | 134 | $76,061 |
| 11 | 14 | 99 | Jeff Burton | Roush Racing | Ford | 292 | 0 | running | 130 | $85,892 |
| 12 | 21 | 28 | Ricky Rudd | Robert Yates Racing | Ford | 292 | 0 | running | 127 | $86,012 |
| 13 | 26 | 55 | Bobby Hamilton | Andy Petree Racing | Chevrolet | 292 | 0 | running | 124 | $66,440 |
| 14 | 30 | 45 | Kyle Petty | Petty Enterprises | Dodge | 292 | 0 | running | 121 | $39,460 |
| 15 | 17 | 15 | Michael Waltrip | Dale Earnhardt, Inc. | Chevrolet | 292 | 0 | running | 118 | $53,780 |
| 16 | 19 | 19 | Jeremy Mayfield | Evernham Motorsports | Dodge | 292 | 0 | running | 115 | $51,585 |
| 17 | 27 | 26 | Joe Nemechek | Haas-Carter Motorsports | Ford | 292 | 0 | running | 112 | $67,977 |
| 18 | 20 | 25 | Jerry Nadeau | Hendrick Motorsports | Chevrolet | 291 | 0 | running | 109 | $50,470 |
| 19 | 38 | 44 | Buckshot Jones | Petty Enterprises | Dodge | 290 | 0 | running | 106 | $48,740 |
| 20 | 29 | 4 | Mike Skinner | Morgan–McClure Motorsports | Chevrolet | 290 | 0 | running | 103 | $53,409 |
| 21 | 12 | 18 | Bobby Labonte | Joe Gibbs Racing | Pontiac | 289 | 0 | running | 100 | $83,533 |
| 22 | 35 | 43 | John Andretti | Petty Enterprises | Dodge | 289 | 0 | running | 97 | $68,323 |
| 23 | 37 | 5 | Terry Labonte | Hendrick Motorsports | Chevrolet | 289 | 0 | running | 94 | $69,758 |
| 24 | 41 | 90 | Rick Mast | Donlavey Racing | Ford | 287 | 0 | running | 91 | $40,610 |
| 25 | 9 | 30 | Jeff Green | Richard Childress Racing | Chevrolet | 284 | 0 | running | 88 | $36,895 |
| 26 | 40 | 7 | Casey Atwood | Ultra-Evernham Motorsports | Dodge | 283 | 0 | running | 85 | $40,085 |
| 27 | 32 | 14 | Stacy Compton | A. J. Foyt Enterprises | Pontiac | 282 | 0 | running | 82 | $39,785 |
| 28 | 13 | 97 | Kurt Busch | Roush Racing | Ford | 278 | 0 | running | 79 | $47,930 |
| 29 | 31 | 6 | Mark Martin | Roush Racing | Ford | 278 | 5 | running | 81 | $73,073 |
| 30 | 25 | 77 | Dave Blaney | Jasper Motorsports | Ford | 275 | 0 | running | 73 | $47,685 |
| 31 | 15 | 22 | Ward Burton | Bill Davis Racing | Dodge | 266 | 1 | running | 75 | $78,980 |
| 32 | 39 | 23 | Hut Stricklin | Bill Davis Racing | Dodge | 257 | 0 | running | 67 | $46,925 |
| 33 | 24 | 10 | Johnny Benson Jr. | MBV Motorsports | Pontiac | 250 | 0 | crash | 64 | $65,570 |
| 34 | 28 | 31 | Robby Gordon | Richard Childress Racing | Chevrolet | 249 | 0 | running | 61 | $64,321 |
| 35 | 8 | 36 | Ken Schrader | MB2 Motorsports | Pontiac | 227 | 0 | crash | 58 | $43,710 |
| 36 | 36 | 20 | Tony Stewart | Joe Gibbs Racing | Pontiac | 225 | 7 | crash | 60 | $83,233 |
| 37 | 7 | 41 | Jimmy Spencer | Chip Ganassi Racing | Dodge | 225 | 0 | crash | 52 | $35,625 |
| 38 | 33 | 11 | Brett Bodine | Brett Bodine Racing | Ford | 196 | 0 | crash | 49 | $35,565 |
| 39 | 4 | 1 | Steve Park | Dale Earnhardt, Inc. | Chevrolet | 133 | 19 | running | 51 | $65,390 |
| 40 | 22 | 88 | Dale Jarrett | Robert Yates Racing | Ford | 115 | 0 | engine | 43 | $83,193 |
| 41 | 1 | 32 | Ricky Craven | PPI Motorsports | Ford | 64 | 18 | crash | 45 | $48,850 |
| 42 | 42 | 49 | Shawna Robinson (R) | BAM Racing | Dodge | 51 | 0 | ignition | 37 | $35,290 |
| 43 | 43 | 71 | Andy Hillenburg | Marcis Auto Racing | Chevrolet | 12 | 0 | engine | 34 | $34,598 |
Official race results

| Previous race: 2002 UAW-DaimlerChrysler 400 | NASCAR Winston Cup Series; 2002 season | Next race: 2002 Food City 500 |
