= 2002 Food City 500 =

Race details
- Race 6 of 36 in the 2002 NASCAR Winston Cup Series
- Map of the Bristol Motor Speedway
- Date: March 24, 2002
- Location: Bristol Motor Speedway, Bristol, Tennessee
- Course: Permanent racing facility
- Course length: 0.533 miles (0.858 km)
- Distance: 500 laps, 266.5 mi (428.89 km)
- Average speed: 82.281 mph (132.418 km/h)

Pole position
Driver	Jeff Gordon	Hendrick Motorsports
- Time: 15.083

Most laps led
Driver	Dale Earnhardt Jr.	Dale Earnhardt, Inc.
- Laps: 181

Winner
No. 97	Kurt Busch	Roush Racing

Television in the United States
- Network: Fox Broadcasting Company
- Announcers: Mike Joy, Darrell Waltrip, Larry McReynolds

The 2002 Food City 500 was the sixth stock car race of the 2002 NASCAR Winston Cup Series. It was held on March 24, 2002, at the Bristol Motor Speedway in Bristol, Tennessee. The 500-lap race was won by Kurt Busch of the Roush Racing team; Jimmy Spencer finished second and Ricky Rudd coming in third.

== Report ==
=== Background ===
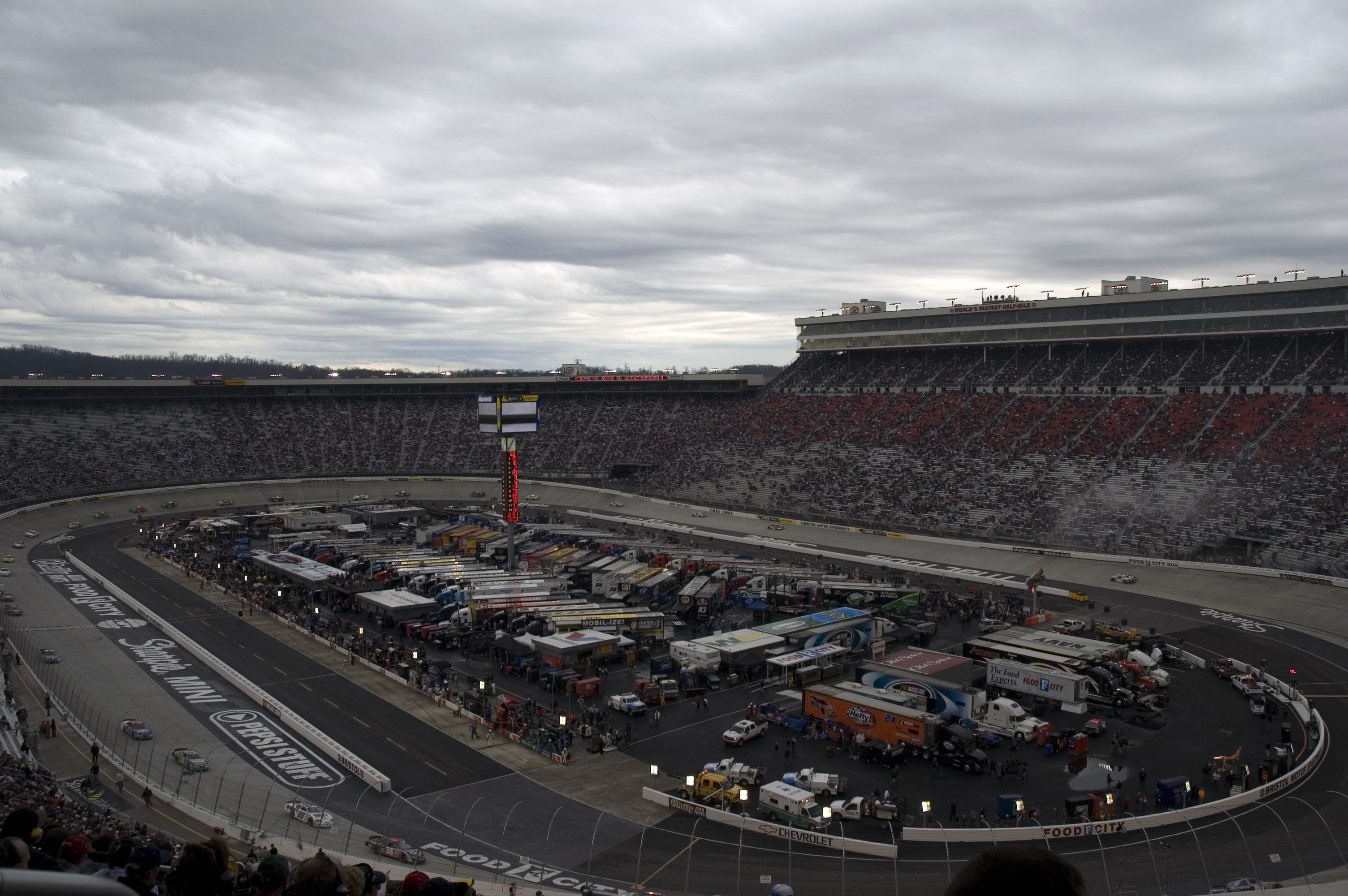
Bristol Motor Speedway, where the race was held.

Bristol Motor Speedway is one of five short tracks to hold NASCAR races; the others are Richmond International Raceway, Dover International Speedway, Martinsville Speedway, and Phoenix International Raceway. Its standard track at Bristol Motor Speedway is a four-turn short track oval that is 0.533 miles (0.858 km) long. The track's turns are banked from twenty-four to thirty degrees, while the front stretch (the location of the finish line) is banked from six to ten degrees. The back stretch also has banking from six to ten degrees.

Before the race, Sterling Marlin led the Drivers' Championship with 825 points, with Ryan Newman in second place on 726 points. Matt Kenseth and Rusty Wallace were third and fourth with 682 and 677 points respectively, with Jimmie Johnson in fifth on 667 points. Jeff Gordon, Jeff Burton, Ward Burton, Mark Martin and Dale Earnhardt Jr. rounded out the top ten. In the Manufacturers' Championship, Dodge was leading with 36 points, five ahead of their rivals Ford in second position. Pontiac, with 23 points, was three points in front of Chevrolet in the battle for third place. Elliott Sadler was the race's defending champion.

In preparation for the race, NASCAR held several test sessions on March 12–13, 2002 at the track for teams to prepare for the event. The first day's testing session was due to begin at 9 a.m. EST, and conclude at 5:00 p.m. EST but rain forced the session to be postponed to March 13. Rain continued on the second day, which forced most teams to leave without completing any testing, but drivers such as Mike Skinner were able to get limited running in their cars. NASCAR implemented a new pit-road procedure for the race during caution periods where drivers where required to enter pit road in turn two and exit at turn one. Drivers who violated this rule could have potentially received a stop-and-go penalty or rejoin at the rear of the nearest longest line. Beginning at the race, teams applying for provisionals after qualifying would not be charged if the entry field for a NASCAR sanctioned event was less or equal than the number of starting entries provided by the official entry blank.

=== Practice and qualification ===
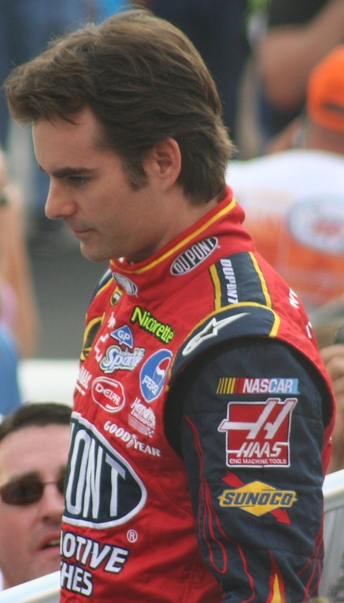
Jeff Gordon (pictured in 2007) won pole position with the fastest time, 15.083.

Three practice sessions were held before the Sunday race—one on Friday and two on Saturday. The first session lasted 120 minutes, while the second and final sessions ran for 45 minutes. In the first practice session, Jeff Gordon was fastest, placing ahead of Jerry Nadeau in second and Skinner in third. Casey Atwood was fourth fastest, and Buckshot Jones placed fifth. Marlin, Kevin Harvick, Jeff Green, Bobby Hamilton, and Michael Waltrip rounded out the top ten fastest drivers in the session. During the session, Johnson crashed his car into the barriers, forcing him to use his back-up car for the remainder of the race weekend. Johnson was unhurt.

All forty-three drivers entered qualifying. Jeff Gordon clinched his first pole position of the season and his first at the track, with a time of 15.083 seconds. The time also made a new track record. He was joined on the front row of the grid by Robby Gordon, in his best qualifying performance of the season. Jeremy Mayfield qualified third, Jimmy Spencer took fourth, and Skinner started fifth. Kenseth, Nadeau, Newman, Waltrip, and Sadler completed the top ten starting positions. During qualifying, Joe Nemechek spun during his attempt, though he managed to continue, and Jeff Burton's lap was delayed because of problems with his car's suspension. Once qualifying had concluded, J. Gordon said, "The first lap I was a little bit loose, and I said, ‘Boy, I better put it together on the second lap.' I made a really nice, smooth but pretty aggressive second lap. The momentum I carried got us a pole."

Green was fastest in the second practice session on Saturday, ahead of Nadeau in second and Atwood in third. J. Gordon was the fourth quickest, and Robby Gordon took fifth. Ricky Rudd managed sixth. Martin, Tony Stewart, Skinner, and Jeff Burton followed in the top ten. Later that day, Nadeau was fastest with a time of 15.661. Stewart and Skinner followed in second and third with times of 15.779 and 15.786. Atwood was fourth quickest, just ahead of Green and Wallace. J. Gordon was the seventh fastest, Kenseth eighth, Harvick ninth, and Steve Park tenth. After the session ended, Stewart went to the Motor Racing Outreach trailer to undergo physical therapy having still suffering the effects from his crash at the previous race held at Darlington Speedway. His team had Todd Bodine to fill in should Stewart had been not ready to race.

=== Race ===
The race began at 1:00 p.m. EST and was televised live in the United States on Fox. During the start of the race, weather conditions were sunny with the ambient temperature 57 °F (14 °C) and the track temperature 80 °F (27 °C). Reverend Mike Rife, of the Vansant Church of Christ in Vansant, Virginia, began pre-race ceremonies with the invocation. Country music singer and Epic Records artist Tammy Cochran performed the national anthem, and the President and Chief Executive Officer of Food City Steven C. Smith gave the command for drivers to start their engines.

Robby Gordon got ahead of Jeff Gordon before the cars took the green flag to start the race and maintained the lead going into the first turn. Spencer immediately passed Mayfield to take third. At the start of the second lap, Robby Gordon was given the black flag for jumping the start and was required to drive through pit road, handing the lead back to Jeff Gordon. Park made contact with the rear of Jones on lap four, causing him to hit the wall at turn one and the first caution of the race was given. No driver made a pit stop during the caution period. Jeff Gordon maintained his lead at the lap nine restart, ahead of Spencer who began to challenge for Gordon for the lead. Spencer got loose when lap ten started, allowing Jeff Gordon to draw clear. Stewart bumped Waltrip who went into the backstretch wall during lap eleven, causing the latter to drop to 30th position. Skinner managed to pass Mayfield for the third position on lap 22.

By the 26th lap, Jeff Gordon had caught traffic which allowed Spencer to close the gap, and attempted to pass him at turn two but was unable to complete it due to the presence of Brett Bodine. Spencer managed to dive around the inside to pass Jeff Gordon for the lead on lap 31. After starting the race in 40th, Ward Burton had moved up to 29th place by lap 39. The second caution was given on lap 42 after Stacy Compton tagged the rear left of Newman who made slight contact with the inside wall and Compton spun sideways into the pit road barriers. The pace car pulled off into the pits and Spencer retained the lead at the restart on lap 47. John Andretti was spun off the track by Harvick on lap 52, prompting the third caution. Andretti subsequently made contact with the wall, and sustained damage to the front of his car but was able to continue.

The race resumed on lap 57 with Spencer leading, ahead of Jeff Gordon.

== Results ==
Pos	Grid	Car	Driver	Team	Manufacturer	Laps
1	27	97	Kurt Busch	Roush Racing	Ford	500
2	4	41	Jimmy Spencer	Chip Ganassi Racing	Dodge	500
3	20	28	Ricky Rudd	Robert Yates Racing	Ford	500
4	23	8	Dale Earnhardt Jr.	Dale Earnhardt, Inc.	Chevrolet	500
5	32	18	Bobby Labonte	Joe Gibbs Racing	Pontiac	500
6	6	17	Matt Kenseth	Roush Racing	Ford	500
7	33	48	Jimmie Johnson	Hendrick Motorsports	Chevrolet	500
8	7	25	Jerry Nadeau	Hendrick Motorsports	Chevrolet	500
9	15	2	Rusty Wallace	Penske Racing	Ford	500
10	22	29	Kevin Harvick	Richard Childress Racing	Chevrolet	500
11	37	6	Mark Martin	Roush Racing	Ford	500
12	35	45	Kyle Petty	Petty Enterprises	Dodge	500
13	11	32	Ricky Craven	PPI Motorsports	Ford	500
14	3	19	Jeremy Mayfield	Evernham Motorsports	Dodge	500
15	13	20	Tony Stewart	Joe Gibbs Racing	Pontiac	500
16	38	5	Terry Labonte	Hendrick Motorsports	Chevrolet	500
17	17	77	Dave Blaney	Jasper Motorsports	Ford	500
18	19	7	Casey Atwood	Ultra Motorsports	Dodge	500
19	16	40	Sterling Marlin	Chip Ganassi Racing	Dodge	499
20	2	31	Robby Gordon	Richard Childress Racing	Chevrolet	499

== Standings after the race ==
Drivers' Championship standings

	Pos	Driver	Points
	1	Sterling Marlin	931
1	2	Matt Kenseth	832
1	3	Rusty Wallace	815
1	4	Jimmie Johnson	813
6	5	Kurt Busch	794

Manufacturers' Championship standings

Pos	Manufacturer	Points
1	Dodge	42
2	Ford	31
3	Pontiac	26
4	Chevrolet	24

- Note: Only the top five positions are included for the driver standings.

Previous race: 2002 Carolina Dodge Dealers 400	Winston Cup Series; 2002 season	Next race: 2002 Samsung/RadioShack 500
