= Shawna Robinson =

American stock car racing driver

- Born: November 30, 1964 (age 61); Des Moines, Iowa, U.S.
- Awards: 1988, 1989 Charlotte/Daytona Dash Series Most Popular Driver

NASCAR Cup Series career
- 8 races run over 2 years
- Best finish: 52nd (2002)
- First race: 2001 Kmart 400 (Michigan)
- Last race: 2002 Pepsi 400 (Daytona)
Wins	Top tens	Poles
0	0	0

NASCAR O'Reilly Auto Parts Series career
- 61 races run over 7 years
- Best finish: 23rd (1993)
- First race: 1991 Roses Stores 300 (Rougemont)
- Last race: 2005 Sharpie Professional 250 (Bristol)
Wins	Top tens	Poles
0	1	1

NASCAR FedEx Freight Truck Series career
- 3 races run over 1 year
- Best finish: 72nd (2003)
- First race: 2003 O'Reilly 400K (Texas)
- Last race: 2003 Silverado 350 (Texas)
Wins	Top tens	Poles
0	0	0

Shawna Robinson (born November 30, 1964) is an American former professional stock car racing driver. She was a competitor in all three of NASCAR's national touring series, as well as the ARCA Bondo/Mar-Hyde Series and the Charlotte/Daytona Dash Series. Robinson is one of 16 women to participate in the NASCAR Cup Series, and one of three women to race in the sports' premier event, the Daytona 500.

Robinson started competing in her childhood and, after graduating from high school in 1983, she began racing in semi-tractors. She achieved early success with 30 victories, and moved into the GATR Truck Series becoming the championship's rookie of the year for 1984. Four years later, Robinson started competing in stock car racing where she became the first woman to win a top-level NASCAR-sanctioned race that same year, finishing a career-high third place in the points standings. The following season, Robinson won two races and battled for the Charlotte/Daytona Dash Series championship in which she finished third overall. She was twice voted the Charlotte/Daytona Dash Series Most Popular Driver.

Robinson moved to the NASCAR Busch Series in 1991 where she struggled to perform well but achieved one pole position in 1994. Robinson left a year later to start a family and began an interior decorating business. In 1999, she returned to active competition in the ARCA Bondo/Mar-Hyde Series where she ran strongly, and finished sixth in the series championship standings the following year. Robinson returned to NASCAR in 2001, and made her debut in the Winston Cup Series but was unable to compete successfully. She retired from racing four years later to focus on her family and concentrate on running her interior design and furniture business.

== Biography ==
=== Early life and career ===
Robinson was born on November 30, 1964, in Des Moines, Iowa. Her legal name is Eileen "Shawna" Jade, but she went by Shawna on the racetrack. She is the youngest of five children of former race car driver Richard "Lefty" Robinson, an amateur diesel truck racer who worked on cars in his home garage and promoted races in the Midwestern United States, and his wife Lois who competed in auto racing before she flipped a car, and was asked by Lefty to stop racing. She grew up in a poor family. Lefty and Lois were also known for innovative ways of entertaining crowds at stock car races which garnered national recognition. Robinson was inspired by race car drivers A. J. Foyt, Sammy Swindell, and Steve Kinser in her teenage years, and found inspiration in woman driver Janet Guthrie by her early twenties, as she had more interest in NASCAR than open-wheel racing. She and her siblings were taught that they were allowed to do anything they wished and drove minibikes, motorcycles, and snowmobiles.

After graduating from Saydel High School in 1983, Robinson spent the summer deciding on her career path as she worked as a department store cashier. She went with her father to help him promote local races. Robinson persuaded him to let her compete in racing, and started off at Toledo Speedway driving a 1976 International semi-tractor. She participated in a five-lap sprint race where she finished second after leading for four laps, and took third position in the feature event. After this Robinson began racing full-time, and won thirty feature races before moving to the super-speedway division in April 1984; she faced early resentment from her male competitors. In the same year, Robinson moved from Iowa to Pennsylvania. Lefty believed Robinson's presence helped to increase fans' interest. Robinson's father acted as her mentor although her mother was against her racing because she felt she would be hurt in a crash.

In the same year, Robinson became the first woman to win a Great American Truck Racing (GATR) Truck Series points-scoring race on a superspeedway when she won the Milwaukee Mile Bobtail 100 at Milwaukee Mile. Robinson was sponsored by her father for the remainder of the season after achieving her first race victory. She was voted the 1984 GATR Rookie of the Year. Robinson went to France to compete in the Paul Ricard Grand Prix Truck Race the following year, and took second in the 1986 Grand Prix of Trucks held in Mexico City. Robinson was victorious in the GATR Big Rig race at Flemington Speedway in 1987.

=== NASCAR and ARCA ===
==== 1980s ====
Robinson began competing in the Charlotte/Daytona Dash Series in the spring of 1988. She garnered the attention of the Global Marketing Sports Group owned by Pat Patterson who found her a race seat with car owner David Watson, and drove a Pontiac Sunbird. That same year, she moved to Charlotte, North Carolina because the city is the center for stock car racing. Robinson started the season with a third-place finish in the Charlotte/Daytona Dash Series Florida 200 at Daytona International Speedway. She became the first woman to win a top-level NASCAR Touring Series race with a victory in the AC Delco 100 at Asheville-Weaverville Speedway on June 10, 1988, after starting from thirteenth position and taking the lead seven laps before the finish. She finished third in the Drivers' Championship, and was awarded the series' Rookie of the Year accolade as the highest-placed first season driver. Robinson was also voted by her fellow competitors the Charlotte/Daytona Dash Series Most Popular Driver at the series' awards banquet held in Charlotte.

In the following year, Robinson continued her success by clinching the first pole position by a woman driver in NASCAR at I-95 Speedway. Robinson later started first and won the Dash Series race at Myrtle Beach Speedway; earlier in the year she took the victory at the Lanier National Speedway event and clinched two more pole positions during the season. It wouldn't be another 29 years until another female driver won a major NASCAR touring race. Heading into the season's final race at Langley Speedway, Robinson stood third, 86 points behind championship leader Gary Wade Finley. She need to secure victory if Finley finished last, and her other rival Larry Caudill took seventh, to win the series championship. Robinson secured fourth position in the race, and took third in the points standings. Robinson retained the Charlotte/Daytona Dash Series Most Popular Driver award. She participated in all thirty Charlotte/Daytona Dash Series events held between 1988 and 1989, and achieved 21 top-ten finishes. That same year, Robinson was one of eight professional women athletes nominated by the Women's Sports Foundation for the Sportswoman of the Year Award.

==== 1990s ====
Robinson started competing in the NASCAR Busch Grand National Series in 1991, driving the No. 77 Huffman Racing Buick. At the time, the Busch Grand National Series was considered NASCAR's feeder circuit, a proving ground for drivers who wished to step up to the organization's premiere circuit, the Winston Cup. Early on, she ran sponsor-less because no one provided funding for her. Robinson qualified 26th fastest and finished fifteenth at her first Busch Series race, which took place at Orange County Speedway. Later that year, she finished 21st at Motor Mile Speedway, and eighteenth at the season's second race held at Orange County Speedway. The final race Robinson qualified for was at Charlotte Motor Speedway driving the No. 49 Ferree Racing car, where she finished 41st after an accident. Robinson failed to qualify for the race at Martinsville Speedway. She finished 54th in the Busch Series points standings.

In the 1992 Busch Series, Robinson moved to Silver Racing, driving the No. 21 Oldsmobile. Robinson began the season with a 34th place finish in the Goody's 300, and was involved in an accident after completing 67 laps. Before the Champion 300, Robinson moved to the Pharo Racing No. 33 car after she was released by Silver Racing, and later moved to the No. 25 vehicle owned by Laughlin Racing. Although she struggled during her rookie season, she performed well in July and August, where she finished eleventh (her best of the season) in the Firecracker 200 at Volusia County Speedway, and she equaled the result at Michigan International Speedway. Robinson finished 38th in the final Busch Series championship standings, and was second in the NASCAR Busch Series Rookie of the Year behind Ricky Craven despite her abbreviated schedule.

Robinson went to the No. 35 Chevrolet for Laughlin Racing for the 1993 Busch Series, and drove in twenty-four races. At the season-opening Goody's 300, she retired after 71 laps due to a blown engine; her team also changed manufacturers during the season from Oldsmobile to Pontiac. She took her best finish of the season with an eleventh-place result in the Kroger 200 at Indianapolis Raceway Park. She did not qualify for four races in the 1993 season. Robinson finished the year 23rd in the final points standings, the highest of her Busch Series career. She made her first start in the Busch North Series at New Hampshire Motor Speedway where she qualified, but finished in 34th position after her engine failed. Robinson returned to Ferree Racing to drive the No. 46 Chevrolet for the 1994 Busch Series season.

At the season's second race (at Rockingham Speedway), she started second but finished 36th after being involved in a crash. Two races later, Robinson won her first career pole position (and the first for a woman in the Busch Series) in the Busch Light 300 at Atlanta Motor Speedway. On the race's first lap, she battled with Joe Nemechek and Mike Wallace through the track's third turn when Wallace collided with Robinson which sent her into Nemechek. Robinson continued with heavy damage to the front-end of her car, but retired after completing 63 laps with radiator damage. She attempted to qualify for the Busch North Series race at New Hampshire Motor Speedway but did not record a fast enough lap time to start the race. Robinson achieved her first top-ten finish in the Busch Series later in the season with a tenth-place result in the Fay's 150 at Watkins Glen. However, she was released from the team shortly afterward due to a loss of sponsorship, and ended the year 47th overall. Robinson took time off to rebuild her psyche and self-confidence, and worked on interior decorating as a hobby. She married engine builder Jeff Clark in November 1994.

Robinson went to drive the No. 99 Ford Thunderbird, owned by the poorly-funded Colburn Racing team for the 1995 season, and planned to run five races in the Winston Cup Series along with a full season in the Busch Series. Robinson attempted to enter the Daytona 500, but failed to qualify after finishing 26th in the first Gatorade Twin 125s event. Robinson secured two top-20 finishes in the Busch Series in the team's No. 36 car, but retired from racing after four events to start a family with her husband Jeff Clark. She declined an offer to test at Daytona International Speedway while in the early stages of pregnancy. She said of her decision to have children: "Racing is part of who I am, If I became a different person because I had kids, then the kids were not going to know who I was my whole life before them." Shortly before the birth of her two children, Robinson started her interior-decorating business from her home, and painted murals for homes and businesses.

Robinson returned to racing in 1999 in the ARCA Bondo/Mar-Hyde Series with car owner James Finch. At her debut race in the FirstPlus Financial 200 at Daytona International Speedway, she took a second place finish, the best for a woman driver in the championship. (Note: As of 2020, the record is jointly held by Erin Crocker and Hailie Deegan.) Afterward, Robinson moved into a car owned by Winston Cup Series driver Jeremy Mayfield, and finished fourth at Lowe's Motor Speedway. She qualified in eighth place at the final race of her year in Talladega Superspeedway but was involved in a crash after completing 66 laps and retired from the event. Robinson clinched the season's highest finishing rookie award.

==== 2000s ====
Following her results in the previous year, Kranefuss-Haas Racing owner Michael Kranefuss was interested in Robinson having seen her compete at Daytona. He consulted with other drivers and received positive feedback about her. Hence, Kranefuss and Mayfield elected to give her a full-time seat for the 2000 season. She became the first woman to compete full-time in an American national stock car racing series. During the season, Robinson took top-ten finishes in half the races she entered, and competed alongside the series' points leaders. She reclaimed the series' highest finishing rookie award. Robinson surpassed the previous track record at Michigan International Speedway where she clinched her first pole position in the series. On the race's 82nd lap, she crashed after leaving the track's second turn, and was hospitalized with two broken ribs and an injured right scapula. Robinson was later released to continue racing. Robinson became the first woman to lead at least one lap in the ARCA Series at Toledo Speedway that same year.

Robinson came close to winning her first ARCA race at the final round of the season, the Georgia Boot 400 at Atlanta Motor Speedway, having led a race-high 66 laps, but was overtaken by Bob Strait with three laps to go. Robinson finished sixth in the Drivers' Championship standings, making her the first woman to finish within the top-six final standings in an American national oval track motor sports series. In 2001, Robinson returned to NASCAR to drive the No. 99 Michael Waltrip Racing car for three races in the Busch Series with the objective of obtaining a season-long drive in 2002. The seat materialized when she met Tim Butler and Ken Butler of Aaron's at Atlanta Motor Speedway in the fall of 2000. She later received a phone call from team owner/driver Michael Waltrip who arranged a three-race agreement, but did not reply because she was under contract with Kranefuss. Bobby Kennedy acted as Robinson's crew chief. In her three races, she achieved one top-twenty finish but did not finish the first two events having been involved in crashes. She continued a strong run in ARCA Series with two top-ten finishes in the season's first two races.

Robinson later made her debut in the Winston Cup Series in the No. 84 Michael Kranefuss Racing Ford Taurus, and planned to run six races. The events were chosen because they were at tracks where Robinson felt comfortable, located in large markets where they would receive more attention. Her schedule was devised to allow Robinson time to test. She planned to race at Talladega Superspeedway but decided against it because of the rules regarding restrictor plate racing. Robinson failed to qualify for the first race she attempted (at California Speedway) when her car's rear-end gearing detached causing her to collide with the wall. Four races later, she started from 32nd at Michigan International Speedway, and became the first woman to start a NASCAR Cup Series race since Patty Moise in 1989. Robinson finished 34th after spinning her car in the track's second turn but avoided damage. After she failed to qualify for her next two races, she was unable to complete her schedule due to sponsorship issues. Robinson stated that she used the season as motivation; she hoped to be driving consistently in five years, and wanted to be a spokesperson for women.

Robinson moved to BAM Racing in October 2001 and drove her sole race in the NASCAR Winston West Series at Las Vegas Motor Speedway that same month. Robinson was sent to a driving school to familiarize herself with the track, and Kranefuss granted her permission to race. She retired due to a car failure while running in third position. Team owner Tony Morgenthau first noticed Robinson at an ARCA race at Pocono Raceway the previous year when she made contact with his driver Matty Mullins who was sent into the wall. He had been impressed with her pace at Las Vegas, and asked Robinson afterward why she had not competed in more events. He later offered her a multi-year contract which she signed in December 2001. Her crew chief was former Busch Series driver Eddie Sharp. She attempted to qualify for 24-races during the 2002 season since her team had no owner points because they were a new operation. Robinson went to Kranefuss to terminate her contract with his team. She ran for Rookie of the Year, but was seen by the Chicago Tribune as having little chance of securing the honor.

At the season-opening Daytona 500, Robinson qualified in 36th place making her the second woman to start the race; she finished 24th despite spinning into the track's infield, and avoided a pit road collision with Bobby Labonte. After the event, Sharp left BAM Racing, and car chief Teddy Brown became Robinson's new crew chief. She struggled during her rookie season, and was unable to attend most races due to sponsorship issues along with her team hiring new drivers which limited her on track experience. (Note: Kevin Lepage, Stuart Kirby, Ron Hornaday Jr., Stacy Compton, and Derrike Cope drove Robinson's car throughout 2002.) Her rival competitors said it was due to Robinson driving an noncompetitive car rather than her driving skill. Robinson made no further appearances for BAM Racing after the Pepsi 400, and was later released by the team. She ended the season 52nd in the Drivers' Championship, and was fourth in the Rookie of the Year standings. Outside racing, Robinson spoke for Women in Sports, and attended meetings of several associations and business groups while taking the time to be with her children. She separated from Jeff Clark in early 2002, but both remained on good terms.

Robinson moved to the Craftsman Truck Series in 2003, driving the No. 49 Mike Starr Racing Chevrolet Silverado for three races, with a pit crew consisting entirely of women. At her first race at Texas Motor Speedway, she finished 18th after incurring two race penalties which put her five laps behind race winner Brendan Gaughan. Robinson followed it up with consecutive 29th-place finishes at Las Vegas Motor Speedway and Talladega Superspeedway but failed to finish both events, and finished the year 72nd overall. She returned to ARCA in the same year, and drove in the season's first two races. Robinson failed to finish at Daytona International Speedway due to an engine failure, and took an 11th-place finish at Atlanta Motor Speedway. Robinson competed in the annual ten-lap Toyota Pro/Celebrity Race in Long Beach, California, as one of five drivers in the "Pro" category. She finished seventh overall and fourth in her class. Robinson drove in two Iowa State Fair dirt races in August 2003.

Midway through 2004, Robinson entered one race in the Busch Series (the Meijer 300 at Kentucky Speedway) for Stanton Barrett Motorsports in its No. 91 Pontiac after team owner Stanton Barrett made a phone call to Robinson regarding a deal which she accepted. She failed to qualify for the event. Robinson left auto racing at the end of 2005 after poor performances driving six races for the No. 23 Keith Coleman Racing team in the Busch Series, and vowed that if she returned, she would do it by herself. She refused to be labelled as either a "start and park" or a "gimmick" driver because she was a woman. She dealt with successive crew chiefs and team owners who collaborated against her to give her poor results, and was labelled as "emotionally unstable" when she attempted to stop sexism towards her. Robinson is one of 16 women to have participated in the NASCAR Cup Series, and one of three to have driven in the series' premier event, the Daytona 500.

=== Post-racing career ===
Robinson focused on her family full-time, and continued to concentrate on her interior design business. Several of her clients came from the NASCAR community. She also started a company called Happy Chairs in the Matthews area of Charlotte where she creates her own furniture and redesigns old chairs. It came after Robinson looked for furnishings in a national furniture chain store and discovered a display chair that she liked. She begins the process of renovating old chairs by searching for those that are in poor condition but are structurally intact and are architecturally appealing. Robinson dismantles the chair and starts reconstructing it. Her work has received critical acclaim from online magazines and customers. Robinson names designer Trina Turk and several clothing companies as her influences.

Robinson applied to participate in the CBS reality competition show The Amazing Race 16 with NASCAR Truck Series driver Jennifer Jo Cobb as her teammate but both were cut from the program. Robinson was invited to donate memorabilia to the NASCAR Hall of Fame but did not send anything because of her commitment to The Amazing Race 16 audition. She was involved with the planning and decorating for Kelley Earnhardt Miller's marriage in 2011. In March 2014, Robinson was diagnosed with stage three breast cancer, which she was told had also spread to her lymph nodes. She underwent treatment with chemotherapy and radiation therapy, causing the removal of 18 lymph nodes and a lump in her breast. Robinson was cared for by her mother-in-law for seven months. Her friends ran her businesses on her behalf. Earnhardt Miller along with Dale Earnhardt Jr., ran fundraising events to help Robinson pay her medical bills. She later entered remission, and completed her final radiation treatment in September 2015.

== Legacy ==
Robinson has been described as "a competent racer" by fellow drivers. As a woman race car driver, Robinson was a pioneer in NASCAR racing, an industry that is predominantly male, and she established a precedent that allowed others like Danica Patrick to follow. She was honored for her auto racing career with a resolution adopted by the Iowa Senate in March 2002. In an interview for Sports Illustrated for Women in 2002, Robinson stated that she was an athlete who wanted to compete and win: "Whatever car I'm in, whatever series I'm running, whatever track I'm racing—I want people to know Shawna Robinson was there." Robinson felt she carried on the work of Janet Guthrie in "opening doors for a lot of women" in auto racing and other male-dominated sports.

Joe Dan Bailey, who worked alongside seven-time Cup Series champion Dale Earnhardt, stated Robinson had similar qualities to Earnhardt including how to improve the feel of her car and how it behaved. In an interview with USA Weekend in 2002, Robinson stated that her success was down to an intensive training regime which allowed her to maintain her focus. She noted in 1993 that individuals searched more for her weaknesses rather than strengths, and that there was more pressure placed upon her because of her gender. Robinson stated that she did not try to overpower her male rivals and her career was not "a crusade for feminism". Although Robinson holds a number of "firsts" for women in American motorsports, she said that they do not hold a large significance for her.

== Motorsports career results ==
=== NASCAR ===
(key) (Bold – Pole position awarded by qualifying time. Italics – Pole position earned by points standings or practice time. * – Most laps led. Small number denotes finishing position)

==== Winston Cup Series ====
NASCAR Winston Cup Series results
Year	Team	No.	Make	1	2	3	4	5	6	7	8	9	10	11	12	13	14	15	16	17	18	19	20	21	22	23	24	25	26	27	28	29	30	31	32	33	34	35	36	NWCC	Pts	Ref
1995	Colburn Racing	99	Ford	DAY; DNQ	CAR	RCH	ATL	DAR	BRI	NWS	MAR	TAL	SON	CLT	DOV	POC	MCH	DAY	NHA	POC	TAL	IND	GLN	MCH	BRI	DAR	RCH	DOV	MAR	NWS	CLT	CAR	PHO	ATL						N/A	–	
2001	Michael Kranefuss Racing	84	Ford	DAY	CAR	LVS	ATL	DAR	BRI	TEX	MAR	TAL	CAL; DNQ	RCH	CLT	DOV	MCH; 34	POC	SON	DAY	CHI; DNQ	NHA	POC	IND; DNQ	GLN	MCH	BRI	DAR	RCH	DOV	KAN	CLT	MAR	TAL	PHO	CAR	HOM	ATL	NHA	66th	61	
2002	BAM Racing	49	Dodge	DAY; 24	CAR	LVS; 42	ATL; 34	DAR; 42	BRI	TEX; 36	MAR	TAL; DNQ	CAL; 42	RCH	CLT	DOV	POC	MCH	SON	DAY; 40	CHI	NHA	POC	IND	GLN	MCH	BRI	DAR	RCH	NHA	DOV	KAN	TAL	CLT	MAR	ATL	CAR	PHO	HOM	52nd	361	

===== Daytona 500 results =====
Year	Team	Manufacturer	Start	Finish
1995	Colburn Racing	Ford	DNQ	
2002	BAM Racing	Dodge	36	24

==== Busch Series ====
NASCAR Busch Series results
Year	Team	No.	Make	1	2	3	4	5	6	7	8	9	10	11	12	13	14	15	16	17	18	19	20	21	22	23	24	25	26	27	28	29	30	31	32	33	34	35	NBSC	Pts	Ref
1991	Huffman Racing	77	Buick	DAY	RCH	CAR	MAR	VOL	HCY; DNQ	DAR	BRI	LAN	SBO	NZH	CLT	DOV	ROU; 15	HCY	MYB	GLN	OXF	NHA	SBO	DUB; 21	IRP	ROU; 18	BRI	DAR	RCH	DOV				MAR; DNQ					54th	400	
1991	Ferree Racing	49	Buick																												CLT; 30	NHA	CAR						54th	400	
1992	Silver Racing	21	Olds	DAY; 34	CAR; 16	RCH	ATL; 43	MAR	DAR	BRI	HCY	LAN	DUB	NZH																									38th	1099	
1992	Pharo Racing	33	Olds												CLT; 30	DOV	ROU; 27	MYB	GLN																				38th	1099	
1992	Laughlin Racing	25	Olds																	VOL; 11	NHA	TAL	IRP; 27	ROU	MCH; 11	NHA; 24	BRI	DAR; 27	RCH; 19	DOV	CLT; 30	MAR	CAR; 41	HCY					38th	1099	
1993	Laughlin Racing	35	Chevy	DAY; 32	CAR; 27	RCH; 34	DAR; 28	BRI; 14	HCY; 15	ROU; 27				DOV; 23				TAL; 40		MCH; 26		BRI; 17		RCH; DNQ			CLT; DNQ												23rd	1950	
1993	Laughlin Racing	35	Olds								MAR; 30																												23rd	1950	
1993	Laughlin Racing	35	Pontiac									NZH; 22	CLT		MYB; 32	GLN; 22	MLW; 34		IRP; 12		NHA; 34		DAR; 30		DOV; 21	ROU; 23		MAR; 32	CAR; 37	HCY; DNQ	ATL; 42								23rd	1950	
1994	Ferree Racing	46	Chevy	DAY; DNQ	CAR; 36	RCH; 23	**ATL**; 36	MAR; 29	DAR; DNQ	HCY; DNQ	BRI; 36	ROU; DNQ	NHA; DNQ	NZH	CLT; DNQ	DOV; 24	MYB; 26	GLN; 10	MLW; 22	SBO	TAL	HCY	IRP	MCH	BRI	DAR	RCH	DOV	CLT	MAR	CAR								47th	742	
1995	Colburn Racing	36	Ford	DAY; DNQ	CAR; 16	RCH; DNQ	ATL; 17	NSV	DAR	BRI	HCY	NHA	NZH	CLT	DOV	MYB	GLN	MLW	TAL	SBO	IRP	MCH	BRI	DAR	RCH	DOV	CLT	CAR	HOM										69th	227	
2001	Michael Waltrip Racing	99	Chevy	DAY	CAR	LVS	ATL	DAR	BRI	TEX; 39	NSH; 43	TAL; 19	CAL	RCH	NHA	NZH	CLT	DOV	KEN	MLW	GLN	CHI	GTY	PPR	IRP	MCH	BRI	DAR	RCH	DOV	KAN	CLT	MEM	PHO	CAR	HOM			82nd	186	
2004	Stanton Barrett Motorsports	91	Pontiac	DAY	CAR	LVS	DAR	BRI	TEX	NSH	TAL	CAL	GTY	RCH	NZH	CLT	DOV	NSH	KEN; DNQ	MLW	DAY	CHI	NHA	PPR	IRP	MCH	BRI	CAL	RCH	DOV	KAN	CLT	MEM	ATL	PHO	DAR	HOM		N/A	–	
2005	Keith Coleman Racing	23	Chevy	DAY; 27	CAL; 35	MXC; 30	LVS; 31	ATL; 36	NSH; DNQ	BRI; 39	TEX; DNQ	PHO	TAL	DAR	RCH	CLT	DOV	NSH	KEN	MLW	DAY	CHI	NHA	PPR	GTY	IRP	GLN	MCH	BRI	CAL	RCH	DOV	KAN	CLT	MEM	TEX	PHO	HOM	79th	384	

==== Craftsman Truck Series ====
NASCAR Craftsman Truck Series results
Year	Team	No.	Make	1	2	3	4	5	6	7	8	9	10	11	12	13	14	15	16	17	18	19	20	21	22	23	24	25	NCTC	Pts	Ref
2003	Mike Starr Racing	49	Chevy	DAY	DAR	MMR	MAR	CLT	DOV	TEX; 18	MEM	MLW	KAN	KEN	GTW	MCH	IRP	NSH	BRI	RCH	NHA	CAL	LVS; 29	SBO	TEX; 29	MAR	PHO	HOM	72nd	261	

==== Busch North Series ====
NASCAR Busch North Series results
Year	Team	No.	Make	1	2	3	4	5	6	7	8	9	10	11	12	13	14	15	16	17	18	19	NBNSC	Pts	Ref
1993	Mike Laughlin	35	Chevy	LEE	NHA	MND	NZH	HOL	GLN	JEN	STA	GLN	NHA; 34	WIS	NHA	NHA	RPS	TMP	WMM	LEE	EPP	LRP	75th	61	

==== Winston West Series ====
NASCAR Winston West Series results
Year	Team	No.	Make	1	2	3	4	5	6	7	8	9	10	11	12	13	14	NWWSC	Pts	Ref
2001	BAM Racing	48	Pontiac	PHO	LVS	TUS	MMR	CAL	IRW	LAG	KAN	EVG	CNS	IRW	RMR	LVS; 17	IRW	53rd	112	

=== ARCA Re/Max Series ===
(key) (Bold – Pole position awarded by qualifying time. Italics – Pole position earned by points standings or practice time. * – Most laps led.)

ARCA Re/Max Series results
Year	Team	No.	Make	1	2	3	4	5	6	7	8	9	10	11	12	13	14	15	16	17	18	19	20	21	22	23	24	25	ARSC	Pts	Ref
1999	Phoenix Racing	1	Chevy	DAY; 2	ATL	SLM	AND																TAL; 30	ATL					55th	510	
1999	Michael Kranefuss Racing	8	Ford					CLT; 4	MCH	POC	TOL	SBS	BLN	POC	KIL	FRS	FLM	ISF	WIN	DSF	SLM	CLT							55th	510	
2000	Michael Kranefuss Racing	8	Ford	DAY; 13	SLM; 9	AND; 6	CLT; 23	KIL; 9	FRS; 25	**MCH**; 33	POC; 4	TOL; 7	KEN; 24	BLN; 10	POC; 36	WIN; 7	ISF; 12	KEN; 10	DSF; 19	SLM; 15	CLT; 13	TAL; 6	ATL; 5*						6th	4265	
2001	Michael Kranefuss Racing	8	Ford	DAY; 7	NSH; 3	WIN	SLM	GTY	KEN	CLT	KAN	MCH	POC	MEM	GLN	KEN	MCH	POC	NSH	ISF	CHI	DSF	SLM	TOL	BLN	CLT	TAL	ATL	79th	410	
2003	PBM Racing	65	Dodge	DAY; 33																									105th	240	
2003	PBM Racing	65	Chevy		ATL; 11	NSH	SLM	TOL	KEN	CLT	BLN	KAN	MCH	LER	POC	POC	NSH	ISF	WIN	DSF	CHI	SLM	TAL	CLT	SBO				105th	240	

== See also ==
- List of female NASCAR drivers
