= Casey Atwood =

American racing driver (born 1980)

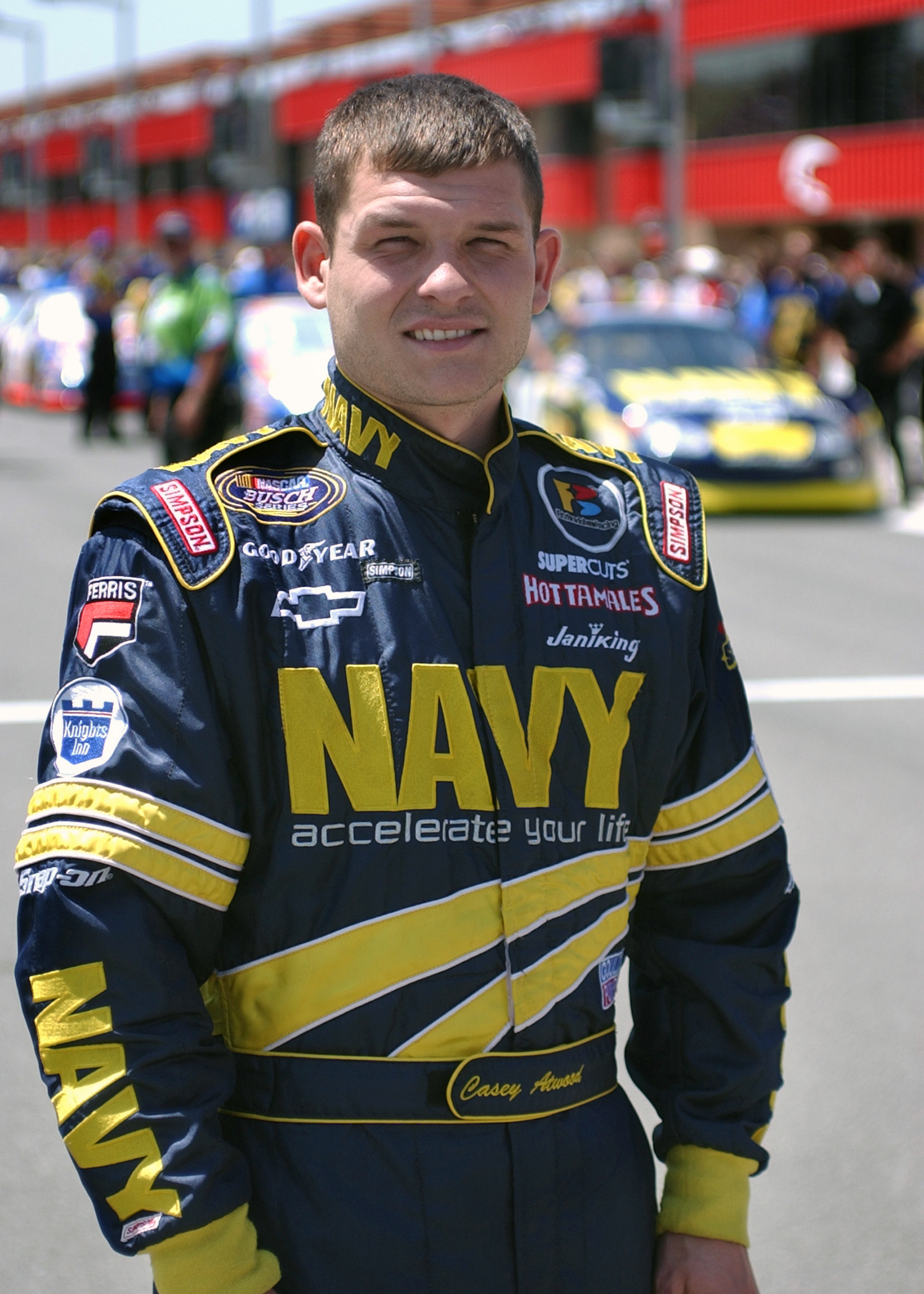
- Atwood at the 2004 Stater Bros. 300
- Born: August 25, 1980 (age 46); Antioch, Tennessee, U.S.
- Achievements: Youngest pole sitter in Busch Series history
- Awards: 1996 Fairgrounds Speedway Rookie of the Year

NASCAR Cup Series career
- 75 races run over 4 years
- Best finish: 26th (2001)
- First race: 2000 Chevrolet Monte Carlo 400 (Richmond)
- Last race: 2003 Brickyard 400 (Indianapolis)
Wins	Top tens	Poles
0	4	1

NASCAR O'Reilly Auto Parts Series career
- 158 races run over 10 years
- 2009 position: 44th
- Best finish: 8th (2000)
- First race: 1998 GM Goodwrench Service Plus 200 (Rockingham)
- Last race: 2009 Able Body Labor 200 (Phoenix)
- First win: 1999 DieHard 250 (Milwaukee)
- Last win: 1999 MBNA Gold 200 (Dover)
Wins	Top tens	Poles
2	30	6

NASCAR FedEx Freight Truck Series career
- 4 races run over 2 years
- Best finish: 52nd (2005)
- First race: 1996 Federated Auto Parts 250 (Nashville)
- Last race: 2005 World Financial Group 200 (Atlanta)
Wins	Top tens	Poles
0	0	0
- Statistics up to date as of July 3, 2012.

Casey Lee Atwood (born August 25, 1980) is an American former stock car racing driver. A former competitor in NASCAR competition, he is the youngest pole winner in Busch Series history, earning a pole start at the age of seventeen.

Atwood had his most success in the Busch Series in 1999 and 2000, driving the No. 27 Chevrolet for Brewco Motorsports. Atwood became the youngest winner in series history in 1999 at 18 years, 313 days (the record would later be broken in 2008 by Joey Logano at 18 years, 21 days old). Atwood's performance led many to label him as "the next Jeff Gordon," and landed him a factory-backed Dodge ride in the Winston Cup Series with Evernham Motorsports for 2001. His struggles at the Cup level over two seasons, however, derailed his career, with his last Cup start coming in 2003 at the young age of 22. After spending parts of seven seasons back in the Busch Series, Atwood's national series career ended in 2009.

== Early life ==
Growing up in Antioch, Tennessee outside of Nashville, Atwood became interested in racing at a young age. By the age of ten, Atwood was racing go-karts. He later progressed to Late Model Stock racing by the age of fifteen. He was the 1996 rookie of the year at Nashville Speedway USA. Casey attended John Overton High School in Nashville until he dropped out in 1999 to pursue his racing career.

== NASCAR career ==
=== Busch Series ===
Atwood debuted in the NASCAR Busch Series (now O'Reilly Auto Parts Series) in 1998 at North Carolina Speedway with a modest 21st-place finish, but stunned the racing world upon his next attempt. At his home track Nashville Speedway in March, the seventeen-year-old Atwood qualified on the pole position, making him the youngest pole winner in NASCAR history, a record that still stands in the series, but in NASCAR in total, it had been surpassed in 2014 by a 16-year-old Cole Custer in the Truck Series. A brilliant performance would follow, as Atwood led 104 laps and ultimately brought his No. 28 Red Line Oil Chevrolet home in second-place to Mike McLaughlin. Atwood made sporadic starts over the course of the year, none equal to his second race, but after moving from Larry Lockamy's part-time team to Hensley Racing in September, he had strong showings at Atlanta (where he started 36th but made his way to the front) and Homestead (where he claimed his second pole). By the end of 1998, he had won two poles and five top-twenties in thirteen races.

In 1999, Atwood joined the Brewco Motorsports No. 27 Castrol GTX Chevrolet team for his first full season in the NASCAR Busch Series. Atwood flipped during the first race of the season at Daytona International Speedway, after he was tapped by Andy Hillenburg coming to the white flag. Atwood became the youngest winner in Busch Series History when he won at the Milwaukee Mile at the age of eighteen on July 4, 1999, which would stand until Joey Logano bested Atwood's mark by winning the Meijer 300 at Kentucky Speedway on June 14, 2008 at the age of eighteen years and 21 days. Atwood won another race at Dover in September and scored two pole starts. He finished 1999 with two wins, five top-fives, and nine top-tens. He finished thirteenth in points. 2000 proved to be another good year for Atwood, as he managed to have two poles and eight top-tens, finishing eighth in points.

=== Winston Cup ===
In 2000, Atwood made his Winston Cup debut in the No. 19 Motorola Ford for Ray Evernham at Richmond International Raceway. He started 35th and finished nineteenth, two laps down. He made two more starts that year and earned his first top-ten, a tenth place finish at Homestead. Atwood moved up to NASCAR Winston Cup full-time in 2001 in the No. 19 Dodge Dealers/UAW car for Evernham's team Evernham Motorsports, a newly formed team under the Dodge banner, to compete for Rookie of the Year honors. Atwood was the youngest driver in the series in 2001. He was nicknamed the "Next Jeff Gordon", due to Gordon's similar rise from Busch to Cup at a young age, and was teammate to former Cup Champion, Bill Elliott. Atwood struggled through the year, but improved as the season went on, winning the pole at Phoenix and was in contention to win the race, while leading the race a flat tire slowed his day as he was only able to make it back to fourteenth place by the end of the race. A week later at Homestead, he was leading with five laps to go, but was passed by Elliott and Michael Waltrip. Atwood would place third, his career-best Cup finish. Atwood also finished third in the Winston Cup Rookie of the Year standings (behind future Cup champions Kevin Harvick and Kurt Busch), and 26th in points.

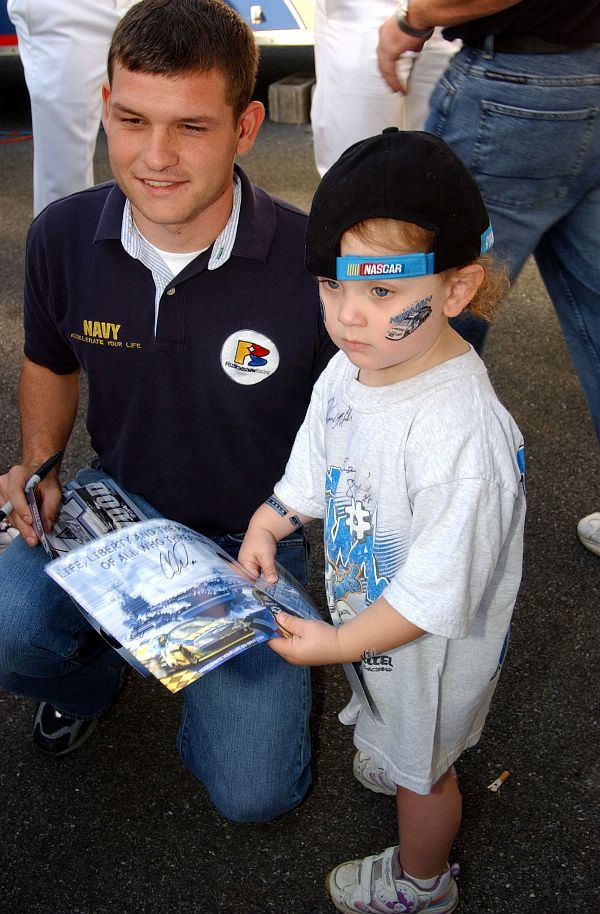
Atwood posing with a young fan at Dover in 2004, courtesy of the U.S. Navy

In 2002, with the signing of Jeremy Mayfield to drive the No. 19, Atwood moved from Evernham's team to the No. 7 of Ultra Motorsports as part of an alliance between Evernham and Ultra owner Jim Smith, where Smith's team would switch from Ford to Dodge and receive equipment and engines from Evernham. The team was known as Ultra-Evernham Motorsports, and sponsored by Sirius Satellite Radio. Atwood struggled throughout the year, having zero top-tens, and just one top-ten qualifying effort and finishing 35th in points. With two races left in the season, he was fired by Jim Smith (which also brought an abrupt end to the Ultra/Evernham partnership) and was replaced by Jason Leffler for the rest of 2002, and later Jimmy Spencer in 2003. Atwood ran the last race of the year in Evernham's No. 91 Dodge and qualified 12th, but finished poorly. Also during 2002, Atwood drove an Evernham ARCA car bearing his former No. 19 at Pocono and dominated, winning the race from the pole.

In 2003, Atwood drove Evernham's No. 91 research and development car for two races. At Pocono Raceway with sponsorship from Mountain Dew LiveWire, Atwood finished 40th after engine troubles. He also ran in the Brickyard 400 without sponsorship, but was only able to muster a 31st-place finish. Atwood's most recent appearance in the series was a failed qualifying attempt in the No. 95 car for the 2006 Ford 400 at Homestead. He was driving a Brewco-prepared Scott Towels/Kleenex Ford for Stanton Barrett.

=== Return to Busch/Nationwide ===
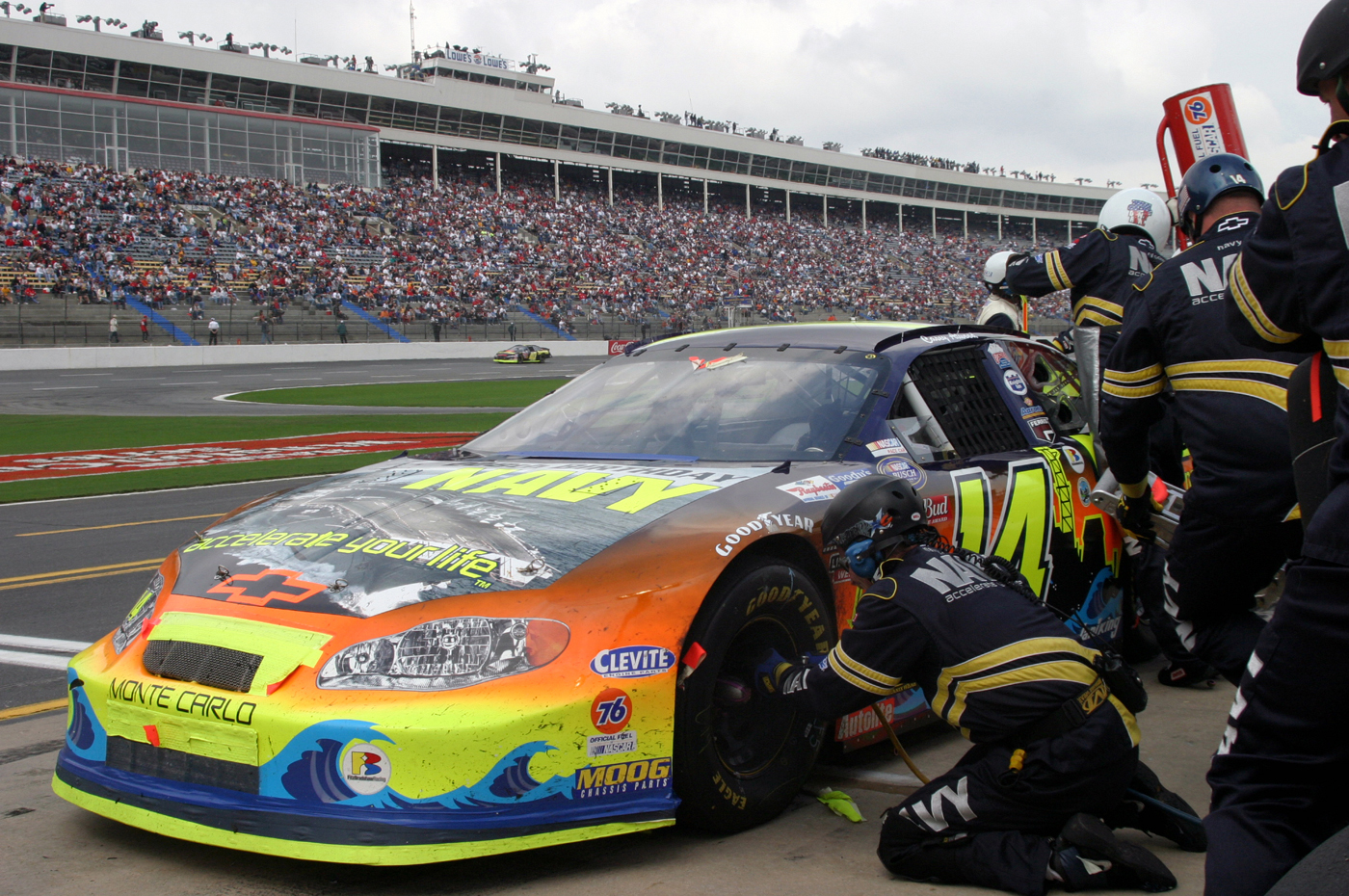
Atwood in 2003

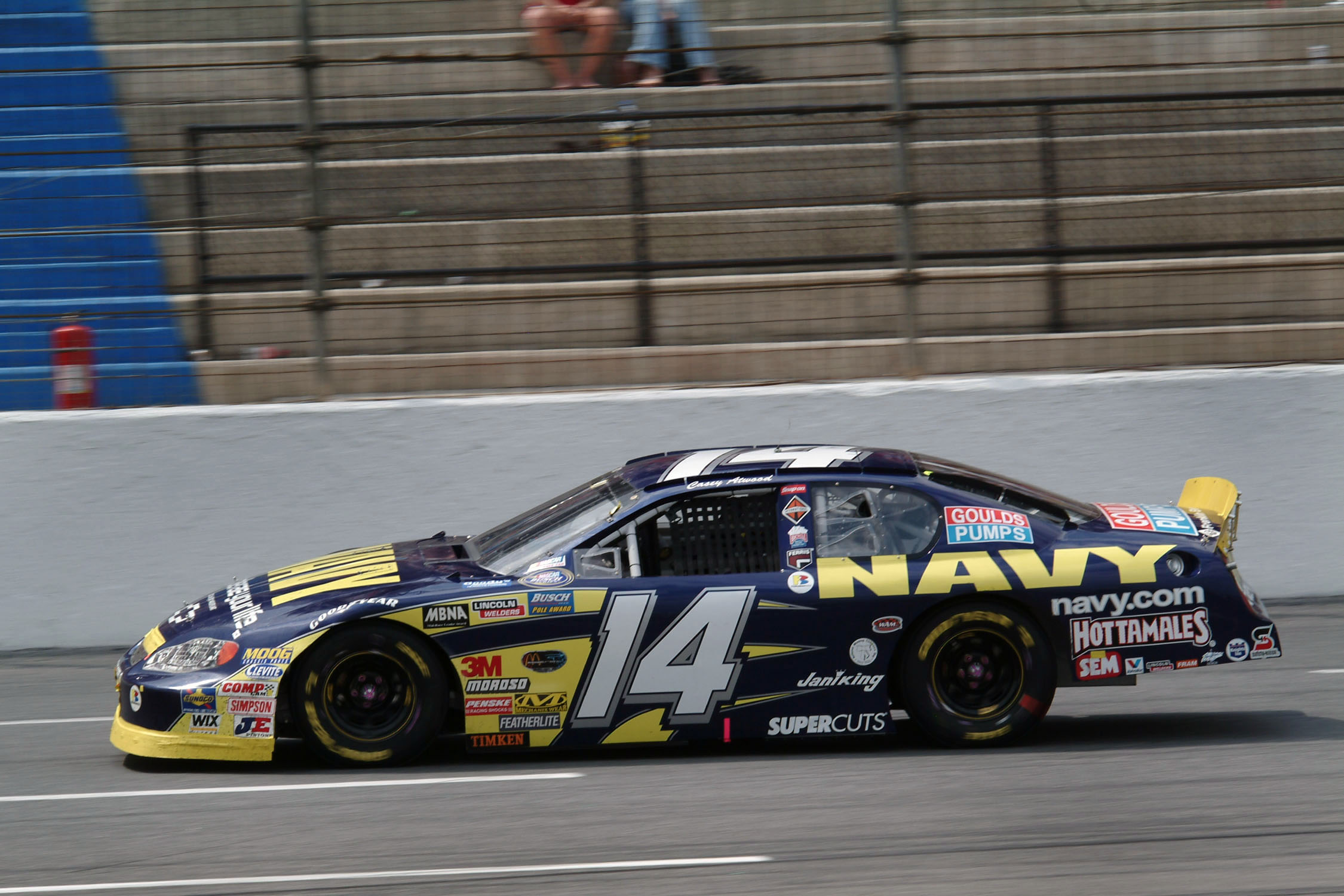
2004 Busch Series car at Lowe's Motor Speedway (now Charlotte Motor Speedway)

After his release from Evernham Motorsports in the Cup Series, Atwood was expected to return to Brewco's 27 (recently vacated by Jamie McMurray), but the ride instead went to Chase Montgomery and Joey Clanton. Beginning at Kentucky in June 2003, Atwood drove the No. 14 Navy Chevrolet for FitzBradshaw Racing, a second car for the team. Atwood also ran three races in the team's third No. 82 Chevy. Atwood returned to the No. 14 full-time for FitzBradshaw in 2004. Atwood scored seven top-ten finishes, but was inconsistent outside of those races. He nearly won at Richmond in September, leading 83 laps, but was tapped by Martin Truex Jr. with less than ten laps to go, allowing Robby Gordon to win. Atwood would finish second in the race. Atwood was diagnosed by owner Armando Fitz of having "a lack of confidence and no aggression on the race track", proceeding to hire a psychologist for the driver. Atwood was released from the team with five races remaining in the season, replaced by Chip Ganassi Racing development driver David Stremme (Fitz was the son-in-law of CGR co-owner Felix Sabates). Atwood was thirteenth in points at the time, and he fell back to nineteenth by the end of the season. In 2005, he drove four races for Evernham Motorsports in the No. 6 Unilever Dodge.

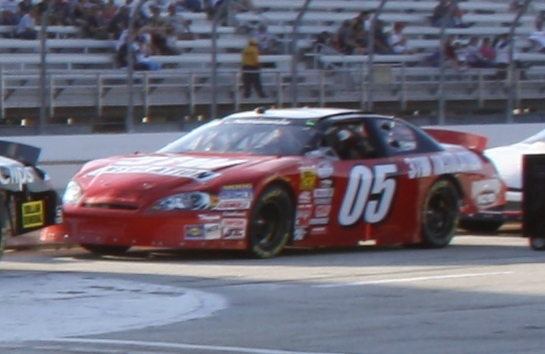
2009 Nationwide car at Milwaukee

In early to mid-2006, Atwood practiced and qualified the No. 18 Joe Gibbs Racing Chevrolet for J. J. Yeley in select races, due to conflicts with Yeley's Nextel Cup Series schedule. Atwood would also occupy this role in 2009 for Kyle Busch. Atwood would later say that these cars, prepared by former Brewco mechanic Jason Ratcliff, were the best he'd ever driven. Beginning at Richmond in September, he returned to the No. 27 car for Brewco Motorsports for the rest of 2006. Atwood was replaced by Ward Burton in the No. 27 car at Brewco for 2007. After a year away from the sport, he returned to Brewco (then known as Baker-Curb Racing) to pilot the 27 car in 2008. In 2009, Atwood qualified for 20 races in the No. 05 car for Wayne Day, and finished 44th in points. At Phoenix in March, he was involved in a grinding crash in which he took three separate hits. Atwood sustained minor injuries. He has not raced since 2009 (His injuries did not bring about the end of his career).

=== Craftsman Truck Series ===
Atwood first appeared on the NASCAR scene in 1996, at the age of sixteen, in a Craftsman Truck Series race at Nashville Speedway USA. He finished 32nd in the No. 48 STP Chevrolet. In 2005, Atwood was picked up by Bobby Hamilton Racing to drive the first three races of the Craftsman Truck Series season in the No. 4 Bailey's Cigarettes Dodge. Atwood ran well during the three race stint, but scored no top-tens.

=== Post-NASCAR career ===
After three years away from racing, Atwood returned to competition in 2012, competing in late model competition at Nashville Fairgrounds Speedway in a car owned by Sterling Marlin.

== Personal life ==
Atwood currently resides in Nashville. He married his longtime girlfriend, Laura, in 2005. They have two daughters together.

== Motorsports career results ==
=== NASCAR ===
(key) (Bold – Pole position awarded by qualifying time. Italics – Pole position earned by points standings or practice time. * – Most laps led.)

==== Nextel Cup Series ====
NASCAR Nextel Cup Series results
Year	Team	No.	Make	1	2	3	4	5	6	7	8	9	10	11	12	13	14	15	16	17	18	19	20	21	22	23	24	25	26	27	28	29	30	31	32	33	34	35	36	NNCC	Pts	Ref
2000	Evernham Motorsports	19	Ford	DAY	CAR	LVS	ATL	DAR	BRI	TEX	MAR	TAL	CAL	RCH	CLT	DOV	MCH	POC	SON	DAY	NHA	POC	IND	GLN	MCH	BRI	DAR	RCH; 19	NHA	DOV	MAR; 25	CLT	TAL	CAR	PHO	HOM; 10	ATL			54th	328	
2001	Evernham Motorsports	19	Dodge	DAY; 20	CAR; 18	LVS; 24	ATL; DNQ	DAR; 26	BRI; 20	TEX; 36	MAR; 26	TAL; 30	CAL; 39	RCH; 12	CLT; 42	DOV; 29	MCH; 30	POC; 38	SON; 41	DAY; 28	CHI; 28	NHA; 12	POC; 15	IND; 41	GLN; 22	MCH; 10	BRI; 17	DAR; 25	RCH; 27	DOV; 9	KAN; 43	CLT; 24	MAR; 25	TAL; 39	**PHO**; 14	CAR; 20	HOM; 3	ATL; 20	NHA; 16	26th	3132	
2002	Ultra-Evernham Motorsports	7	Dodge	DAY; 35	CAR; 39	LVS; 41	ATL; 32	DAR; 26	BRI; 18	TEX; 35	MAR; 38	TAL; 26	CAL; 28	RCH; 22	CLT; 17	DOV; 14	POC; 11	MCH; 39	SON; 21	DAY; 20	CHI; 28	NHA; 36	POC; 28	IND; 38	GLN; 27	MCH; 42	BRI; 18	DAR; 28	RCH; 24	NHA; 34	DOV; 32	KAN; 42	TAL; 34	CLT; 30	MAR; 21	ATL; 38	CAR; 29	PHO		35th	2621	
2002	Evernham Motorsports	91	Dodge																																				HOM; 37	35th	2621	
2003	Evernham Motorsports	91	Dodge	DAY	CAR	LVS	ATL	DAR	BRI	TEX	TAL	MAR	CAL	RCH	CLT	DOV	POC; 40	MCH	SON	DAY	CHI	NHA	POC	IND; 31	GLN	MCH	BRI	DAR	RCH	NHA	DOV	TAL	KAN	CLT	MAR	ATL	PHO	CAR	HOM	61st	113	
2006	Brewco Motorsports	95	Ford	DAY	CAL	LVS	ATL	BRI	MAR	TEX	PHO	TAL	RCH	DAR	CLT	DOV	POC	MCH	SON	DAY	CHI	NHA	POC	IND	GLN	MCH	BRI	CAL	RCH	NHA	DOV	KAN	TAL	CLT	MAR	ATL	TEX	PHO	HOM; DNQ	NA	-	

===== Daytona 500 =====
Year	Team	Manufacturer	Start	Finish
2001	Evernham Motorsports	Dodge	21	20
2002	Ultra-Evernham Motorsports	Dodge	36	35

==== Nationwide Series ====
NASCAR Nationwide Series results
Year	Team	No.	Make	1	2	3	4	5	6	7	8	9	10	11	12	13	14	15	16	17	18	19	20	21	22	23	24	25	26	27	28	29	30	31	32	33	34	35	NNSC	Pts	Ref
1998	Lockamy Racing	28	Chevy	DAY	CAR; 21	LVS	**NSV**; 2	DAR	BRI; 40	TEX	HCY	TAL	NHA; 21	NZH	CLT	DOV	RCH; 13	PPR	GLN	MLW; 24																			38th	1359	
1998	Brewco Motorsports	27	Chevy																		MYB; 28	CAL	SBO; DNQ	IRP	MCH; DNQ	BRI	DAR												38th	1359	
1998	Washington-Erving Motorsports	50	Ford																									RCH; DNQ											38th	1359	
1998	Hensley Motorsports	63	Chevy																										DOV; 24	CLT; 16	GTY; 30	CAR; 17	ATL; 11	**HOM**; 14					38th	1359	
1999	Brewco Motorsports	27	Chevy	DAY; 17	CAR; 5	LVS; DNQ	ATL; 16	DAR; 28	TEX; 35	NSV; 2	BRI; 15	TAL; 8	CAL; 18	NHA; 5	RCH; 20	NZH; 33	CLT; 34	DOV; 36	SBO; 10	GLN; 41	**MLW**; 1*	MYB; 29	PPR; 8	**GTY**; 7	IRP; 32	MCH; 42	BRI; 15	DAR; 26	RCH; 31	DOV; 1	CLT; 23	CAR; 43	MEM; 30	PHO; 26	HOM; 34				13th	3134	
2000	Brewco Motorsports	27	Chevy	DAY; 31	CAR; 32	LVS; 11	ATL; 26	DAR; 42	BRI; 21	TEX; 7	**NSV**; 24	TAL; 17	CAL; 22	RCH; 8	NHA; 7	CLT; 14	DOV; 11	**SBO**; 13	MYB; 11	GLN; 12	MLW; 43	NZH; 7	PPR; 6	GTY; 29	IRP; 31	MCH; 37	BRI; 9	DAR; 27	RCH; 34	DOV; 17	CLT; 22	CAR; 8	MEM; 6	PHO; 14	HOM; 20				8th	3404	
2003	FitzBradshaw Racing	82	Chevy	DAY	CAR	LVS	DAR	BRI	TEX	TAL	NSH	CAL	RCH	GTY	NZH	CLT; DNQ	DOV	NSH				CHI; 21												ATL; 28					37th	1422	
2003	FitzBradshaw Racing	14	Chevy																KEN; 9	MLW; 19	DAY; 27		NHA; 32	PPR	IRP	MCH	BRI; 18	DAR; 10	RCH; 11	DOV; 25	KAN	CLT; 32	MEM; 7		PHO; 8	CAR	HOM; 43		37th	1422	
2004	FitzBradshaw Racing	14	Chevy	DAY; 15	CAR; 19	LVS; 36	DAR; 9	BRI; 34	TEX; 21	NSH; 20	TAL; 13	CAL; 29	GTY; 23	RCH; 14	NZH; 6	CLT; 17	DOV; 18	NSH; 7	KEN; 22	MLW; 32	DAY; 24	CHI; 13	NHA; 31	PPR; 9	IRP; 8	MCH; 25	BRI; 10	CAL; 26	RCH; 2	DOV; 24	KAN; 22	CLT; 20	MEM	ATL	PHO	DAR	HOM		19th	3130	
2005	Evernham Motorsports	6	Dodge	DAY	CAL	MXC	LVS	ATL	NSH	BRI	TEX	PHO	TAL	DAR	RCH	CLT	DOV	NSH	KEN; 9	MLW	DAY	CHI; 21	NHA; 26	PPR; 26	GTY	IRP	GLN	MCH	BRI	CAL	RCH	DOV	KAN	CLT	MEM	TEX	PHO	HOM	76th	408	
2006	Joe Gibbs Racing	18	Chevy	DAY	CAL	MXC	LVS	ATL	BRI	TEX	NSH	PHO	TAL	RCH	DAR	CLT	DOV	NSH	KEN	MLW; QL^{†}	DAY	CHI	NHA	MAR	GTY	IRP	GLN	MCH	BRI	CAL									52nd	814	
2006	Brewco Motorsports	27	Ford																												RCH; 23	DOV; 29	KAN; 17	CLT; 17	MEM; 17	TEX; 18	PHO; 23	HOM; 21	52nd	814	
2007	Brewco Motorsports	37	Ford	DAY	CAL	MXC	LVS	ATL	BRI	NSH	TEX	PHO	TAL	RCH	DAR	CLT	DOV	NSH	KEN	MLW	NHA	DAY	CHI	GTY	IRP	CGV; QL^{‡}	GLN	MCH	BRI	CAL	RCH								80th	412	
2007	Baker Curb Racing	37	Ford																													DOV; 14				TEX; 26	PHO	HOM	80th	412	
2007	Baker Curb Racing	27	Ford																														KAN; 18	CLT; 22					80th	412	
2007	Joe Gibbs Racing	20	Chevy																																MEM; QL^{†}				80th	412	
2008	Day Enterprises	05	Ford	DAY	CAL	LVS	ATL	BRI	NSH	TEX	PHO	MXC	TAL	RCH	DAR	CLT	DOV	NSH	KEN	MLW	NHA	DAY	CHI	GTY; 33	IRP	CGV	GLN	MCH	BRI; 40	CAL								HOM; DNQ	93rd	201	
2008	Curb Racing	27	Ford																												RCH; 23	DOV	KAN	CLT	MEM	TEX	PHO		93rd	201	
2009	Day Enterprises	85	Chevy	DAY	CAL; 40																															TEX; DNQ	PHO; 41	HOM	44th	1178	
2009	Day Enterprises	05	Ford			LVS; 35		TEX; 27		PHO; 31	TAL			CLT; DNQ							CHI; 37			IOW; 35	GLN	MCH; DNQ			ATL; 38										44th	1178	
2009	Day Enterprises	05	Chevy				BRI; 25		NSH; 22			RCH; 25	DAR; 43		DOV; 43	NSH; 40	KEN	MLW; 25	NHA; 40	DAY		GTY; 34	IRP				BRI; 41	CGV		RCH; DNQ	DOV; 36	KAN; 36	CAL; DNQ	CLT; DNQ					44th	1178	
2009	Joe Gibbs Racing	18	Toyota																																MEM; QL^{±}				44th	1178	
^{†} - Qualified for J. J. Yeley · ^{‡} - Qualified for Greg Biffle · ^{±} - Qualified for Kyle Busch

==== Craftsman Truck Series ====
NASCAR Craftsman Truck Series results
Year	Team	No.	Make	1	2	3	4	5	6	7	8	9	10	11	12	13	14	15	16	17	18	19	20	21	22	23	24	25	NCTC	Pts	Ref
1996	Chuck Spicer Racing	48	Chevy	HOM	PHO	POR	EVG	TUS	CNS	HPT	BRI	NZH	MLW	LVL	I70	IRP	FLM	GLN	NSV; 32	RCH	NHA	MAR	NWS	SON	MMR	PHO	LVS		123rd	60	
2005	Bobby Hamilton Racing	4	Dodge	DAY; 14	CAL; 11	ATL; 22	MAR	GTY	MFD	CLT	DOV	TEX	MCH	MLW	KAN	KEN	MEM	IRP	NSH	BRI	RCH	NHA	LVS	MAR	ATL	TEX	PHO	HOM	52nd	348	

=== ARCA Re/Max Series ===
(key) (Bold – Pole position awarded by qualifying time. Italics – Pole position earned by points standings or practice time. * – Most laps led.)

ARCA Re/Max Series results
Year	Team	No.	Make	1	2	3	4	5	6	7	8	9	10	11	12	13	14	15	16	17	18	19	20	21	22	ARSC	Pts	Ref
2002	Evernham Motorsports	19	Dodge	DAY	ATL	NSH	SLM	KEN	CLT	KAN	POC	MCH	TOL	SBO	KEN	BLN	**POC**; 1*	NSH	ISF	WIN	DSF	CHI	SLM	TAL	CLT	100th	260	
2004	FitzBradshaw Racing	14	Chevy	DAY	NSH; 2	SLM	KEN	TOL	CLT	KAN	POC	MCH	SBO	BLN	KEN	GTW	POC	LER	NSH	ISF	TOL	DSF	CHI	SLM	TAL	98th	245	

* Season still in progress
^{1} Ineligible for series points
