= 2001 Carolina Dodge Dealers 400 =

Fifth race of the 2001 NASCAR Winston Cup Series

Race details
- Race 5 of 36 in the 2001 NASCAR Winston Cup Series
- The 2001 Carolina Dodge Dealers 400 program cover, featuring Bill Elliott and Ward Burton.
- Date: March 18, 2001
- Official name: 45th Annual Carolina Dodge Dealers 400
- Location: Darlington, South Carolina, Darlington Raceway
- Course: Permanent racing facility
- Course length: 1.366 miles (2.198 km)
- Distance: 293 laps, 400.238 mi (644.12 km)
- Scheduled distance: 293 laps, 400.238 mi (644.12 km)
- Average speed: 126.557 miles per hour (203.674 km/h)

Pole position
| Driver | Jeff Gordon | Hendrick Motorsports |
- Time: Set by 2001 owner's points

Most laps led
| Driver | Steve Park | Dale Earnhardt, Inc. |
- Laps: 164

Winner
| No. 88 | Dale Jarrett | Robert Yates Racing |

Television in the United States
- Network: FOX
- Announcers: Mike Joy, Larry McReynolds, Darrell Waltrip

Radio in the United States
- Radio: Motor Racing Network

The 2001 Carolina Dodge Dealers 400 was the fifth stock car race of the 2001 NASCAR Winston Cup Series and the 45th iteration of the event. The race was held on Sunday, March 18, 2001, in Darlington, South Carolina, at Darlington Raceway, a 1.366 miles (2.198 km) permanent egg-shaped oval racetrack. The race took the scheduled 293 laps to complete. In the final laps of the race, Robert Yates Racing driver Dale Jarrett would manage to hold off the field on the final restart with seven to go to take his 25th career NASCAR Winston Cup Series victory and his first victory of the season. To fill out the Top 3, Dale Earnhardt, Inc. driver Steve Park and Penske Racing South driver Jeremy Mayfield would finish 2nd and 3rd, respectively.

== Background ==
The layout of Darlington Raceway, the venue where the race was held.

Darlington Raceway is a race track built for NASCAR racing located near Darlington, South Carolina. It is nicknamed "The Lady in Black" and "The Track Too Tough to Tame" by many NASCAR fans and drivers and advertised as "A NASCAR Tradition." It is of a unique, somewhat egg-shaped design, an oval with the ends of very different configurations, a condition which supposedly arose from the proximity of one end of the track to a minnow pond the owner refused to relocate. This situation makes it very challenging for the crews to set up their cars' handling in a way that is effective at both ends.

=== Entry list ===
- (R) denotes rookie driver.

| # | Driver | Team | Make |
|---|---|---|---|
| 1 | Steve Park | Dale Earnhardt, Inc. | Chevrolet |
| 01 | Jason Leffler (R) | Chip Ganassi Racing with Felix Sabates | Dodge |
| 2 | Rusty Wallace | Penske Racing South | Ford |
| 4 | Robby Gordon | Morgan–McClure Motorsports | Chevrolet |
| 5 | Terry Labonte | Hendrick Motorsports | Chevrolet |
| 6 | Mark Martin | Roush Racing | Ford |
| 7 | Mike Wallace | Ultra Motorsports | Ford |
| 8 | Dale Earnhardt Jr. | Dale Earnhardt, Inc. | Chevrolet |
| 9 | Bill Elliott | Evernham Motorsports | Dodge |
| 10 | Johnny Benson Jr. | MBV Motorsports | Pontiac |
| 11 | Brett Bodine | Brett Bodine Racing | Ford |
| 12 | Jeremy Mayfield | Penske Racing South | Ford |
| 14 | Ron Hornaday Jr. (R) | A. J. Foyt Enterprises | Pontiac |
| 15 | Michael Waltrip | Dale Earnhardt, Inc. | Chevrolet |
| 17 | Matt Kenseth | Roush Racing | Ford |
| 18 | Bobby Labonte | Joe Gibbs Racing | Pontiac |
| 19 | Casey Atwood (R) | Evernham Motorsports | Dodge |
| 20 | Tony Stewart | Joe Gibbs Racing | Pontiac |
| 21 | Elliott Sadler | Wood Brothers Racing | Ford |
| 22 | Ward Burton | Bill Davis Racing | Dodge |
| 24 | Jeff Gordon | Hendrick Motorsports | Chevrolet |
| 25 | Jerry Nadeau | Hendrick Motorsports | Chevrolet |
| 26 | Jimmy Spencer | Haas-Carter Motorsports | Ford |
| 27 | Kenny Wallace | Eel River Racing | Pontiac |
| 28 | Ricky Rudd | Robert Yates Racing | Ford |
| 29 | Kevin Harvick (R) | Richard Childress Racing | Chevrolet |
| 31 | Mike Skinner | Richard Childress Racing | Chevrolet |
| 32 | Ricky Craven | PPI Motorsports | Ford |
| 33 | Joe Nemechek | Andy Petree Racing | Chevrolet |
| 36 | Ken Schrader | MBV Motorsports | Pontiac |
| 40 | Sterling Marlin | Chip Ganassi Racing with Felix Sabates | Dodge |
| 43 | John Andretti | Petty Enterprises | Dodge |
| 44 | Buckshot Jones | Petty Enterprises | Dodge |
| 45 | Kyle Petty | Petty Enterprises | Dodge |
| 50 | Rick Mast | Midwest Transit Racing | Chevrolet |
| 55 | Bobby Hamilton | Andy Petree Racing | Chevrolet |
| 66 | Todd Bodine | Haas-Carter Motorsports | Ford |
| 71 | Dave Marcis | Marcis Auto Racing | Chevrolet |
| 77 | Robert Pressley | Jasper Motorsports | Ford |
| 88 | Dale Jarrett | Robert Yates Racing | Ford |
| 90 | Hut Stricklin | Donlavey Racing | Ford |
| 92 | Stacy Compton | Melling Racing | Dodge |
| 93 | Dave Blaney | Bill Davis Racing | Dodge |
| 96 | Andy Houston (R) | PPI Motorsports | Ford |
| 97 | Kurt Busch (R) | Roush Racing | Ford |
| 99 | Jeff Burton | Roush Racing | Ford |
Official entry list

== Practice ==
=== First practice ===
The first practice session was held on Saturday, March 17, at 7:45 AM EST. The session would last for one hour and 45 minutes. Mark Martin, driving for Roush Racing, would set the fastest time in the session, with a lap of 29.787 and an average speed of 165.203 mph (265.868 km/h).

| Pos. | # | Driver | Team | Make | Time | Speed |
|---|---|---|---|---|---|---|
| 1 | 6 | Mark Martin | Roush Racing | Ford | 29.787 | 165.203 |
| 2 | 20 | Tony Stewart | Joe Gibbs Racing | Pontiac | 29.802 | 165.009 |
| 3 | 29 | Kevin Harvick (R) | Richard Childress Racing | Chevrolet | 29.843 | 164.782 |
Full first practice results

=== Final practice ===
The final practice session was held on Saturday, March 17, after the preliminary 2001 SunCom 200 NASCAR Busch Series race. The session would last for one hour. Jeff Gordon, driving for Hendrick Motorsports, would set the fastest time in the session, with a lap of 29.899 and an average speed of 164.474 mph (264.695 km/h).

| Pos. | # | Driver | Team | Make | Time | Speed |
|---|---|---|---|---|---|---|
| 1 | 24 | Jeff Gordon | Hendrick Motorsports | Chevrolet | 29.899 | 164.474 |
| 2 | 1 | Steve Park | Dale Earnhardt, Inc. | Chevrolet | 30.021 | 163.805 |
| 3 | 92 | Stacy Compton | Melling Racing | Dodge | 30.033 | 163.740 |
Full Final practice results

== Qualifying ==
Qualifying was originally scheduled to be held on Saturday, March 17, at 10:40 AM EST. However, due to intense fog, qualifying was cancelled and the lineup was set by the current 2001 owner's points. Per the NASCAR rules at the time, the first 35 spots were determined by the owner's points standings. Then, the next few positions were given to cars who had won the year before, but had not qualified in the top 35. The rest of the starting lineup was then determined by who had attempted to qualify for the previous four races by order of owner's points. As a result, Hendrick Motorsports driver Jeff Gordon would earn the pole.

Three drivers would fail to qualify: Dave Marcis, Andy Houston, and Rick Mast.

=== Full starting lineup ===
| Pos. | # | Driver | Team | Make |
|---|---|---|---|---|
| 1 | 24 | Jeff Gordon | Hendrick Motorsports | Chevrolet |
| 2 | 88 | Dale Jarrett | Robert Yates Racing | Ford |
| 3 | 29 | Kevin Harvick (R) | Richard Childress Racing | Chevrolet |
| 4 | 10 | Johnny Benson Jr. | MBV Motorsports | Pontiac |
| 5 | 40 | Sterling Marlin | Chip Ganassi Racing with Felix Sabates | Dodge |
| 6 | 15 | Michael Waltrip | Dale Earnhardt, Inc. | Chevrolet |
| 7 | 9 | Bill Elliott | Evernham Motorsports | Dodge |
| 8 | 25 | Jerry Nadeau | Hendrick Motorsports | Chevrolet |
| 9 | 2 | Rusty Wallace | Penske Racing South | Ford |
| 10 | 28 | Ricky Rudd | Robert Yates Racing | Ford |
| 11 | 36 | Ken Schrader | MBV Motorsports | Pontiac |
| 12 | 55 | Bobby Hamilton | Andy Petree Racing | Chevrolet |
| 13 | 1 | Steve Park | Dale Earnhardt, Inc. | Chevrolet |
| 14 | 20 | Tony Stewart | Joe Gibbs Racing | Pontiac |
| 15 | 31 | Mike Skinner | Richard Childress Racing | Chevrolet |
| 16 | 8 | Dale Earnhardt Jr. | Dale Earnhardt, Inc. | Chevrolet |
| 17 | 77 | Robert Pressley | Jasper Motorsports | Ford |
| 18 | 5 | Terry Labonte | Hendrick Motorsports | Chevrolet |
| 19 | 21 | Elliott Sadler | Wood Brothers Racing | Ford |
| 20 | 32 | Ricky Craven | PPI Motorsports | Ford |
| 21 | 22 | Ward Burton | Bill Davis Racing | Dodge |
| 22 | 33 | Joe Nemechek | Andy Petree Racing | Chevrolet |
| 23 | 26 | Jimmy Spencer | Haas-Carter Motorsports | Ford |
| 24 | 14 | Ron Hornaday Jr. (R) | A. J. Foyt Enterprises | Pontiac |
| 25 | 6 | Mark Martin | Roush Racing | Ford |
| 26 | 18 | Bobby Labonte | Joe Gibbs Racing | Pontiac |
| 27 | 97 | Kurt Busch (R) | Roush Racing | Ford |
| 28 | 66 | Todd Bodine | Haas-Carter Motorsports | Ford |
| 29 | 92 | Stacy Compton | Melling Racing | Dodge |
| 30 | 17 | Matt Kenseth | Roush Racing | Ford |
| 31 | 11 | Brett Bodine | Brett Bodine Racing | Ford |
| 32 | 19 | Casey Atwood (R) | Evernham Motorsports | Dodge |
| 33 | 93 | Dave Blaney | Bill Davis Racing | Dodge |
| 34 | 43 | John Andretti | Petty Enterprises | Dodge |
| 35 | 7 | Mike Wallace | Ultra Motorsports | Ford |
| 36 | 99 | Jeff Burton | Roush Racing | Ford |
| 37 | 12 | Jeremy Mayfield | Penske Racing South | Ford |
| 38 | 4 | Robby Gordon | Morgan–McClure Motorsports | Chevrolet |
| 39 | 44 | Buckshot Jones | Petty Enterprises | Dodge |
| 40 | 01 | Jason Leffler (R) | Chip Ganassi Racing with Felix Sabates | Dodge |
| 41 | 27 | Kenny Wallace | Eel River Racing | Pontiac |
| 42 | 90 | Hut Stricklin | Donlavey Racing | Ford |
| 43 | 45 | Kyle Petty | Petty Enterprises | Dodge |
Failed to qualify
| 44 | 71 | Dave Marcis | Marcis Auto Racing | Chevrolet |
| 45 | 96 | Andy Houston (R) | PPI Motorsports | Ford |
| 46 | 50 | Rick Mast | Midwest Transit Racing | Chevrolet |
Official starting lineup

== Race results ==
| Fin | St | # | Driver | Team | Make | Laps | Led | Status | Pts | Winnings |
|---|---|---|---|---|---|---|---|---|---|---|
| 1 | 2 | 88 | Dale Jarrett | Robert Yates Racing | Ford | 293 | 16 | running | 180 | $214,612 |
| 2 | 13 | 1 | Steve Park | Dale Earnhardt, Inc. | Chevrolet | 293 | 164 | running | 180 | $105,173 |
| 3 | 37 | 12 | Jeremy Mayfield | Penske Racing South | Ford | 293 | 0 | running | 165 | $98,049 |
| 4 | 23 | 26 | Jimmy Spencer | Haas-Carter Motorsports | Ford | 293 | 2 | running | 165 | $83,640 |
| 5 | 5 | 40 | Sterling Marlin | Chip Ganassi Racing with Felix Sabates | Dodge | 293 | 13 | running | 160 | $68,998 |
| 6 | 34 | 43 | John Andretti | Petty Enterprises | Dodge | 293 | 0 | running | 150 | $86,402 |
| 7 | 4 | 10 | Johnny Benson Jr. | MBV Motorsports | Pontiac | 293 | 25 | running | 151 | $50,670 |
| 8 | 10 | 28 | Ricky Rudd | Robert Yates Racing | Ford | 293 | 0 | running | 142 | $71,187 |
| 9 | 12 | 55 | Bobby Hamilton | Andy Petree Racing | Chevrolet | 293 | 0 | running | 138 | $47,460 |
| 10 | 9 | 2 | Rusty Wallace | Penske Racing South | Ford | 293 | 0 | running | 134 | $82,170 |
| 11 | 26 | 18 | Bobby Labonte | Joe Gibbs Racing | Pontiac | 293 | 0 | running | 130 | $90,927 |
| 12 | 21 | 22 | Ward Burton | Bill Davis Racing | Dodge | 293 | 0 | running | 127 | $70,930 |
| 13 | 11 | 36 | Ken Schrader | MBV Motorsports | Pontiac | 293 | 0 | running | 124 | $51,751 |
| 14 | 3 | 29 | Kevin Harvick (R) | Richard Childress Racing | Chevrolet | 293 | 0 | running | 121 | $81,487 |
| 15 | 17 | 77 | Robert Pressley | Jasper Motorsports | Ford | 293 | 0 | running | 118 | $51,870 |
| 16 | 14 | 20 | Tony Stewart | Joe Gibbs Racing | Pontiac | 293 | 0 | running | 115 | $53,735 |
| 17 | 19 | 21 | Elliott Sadler | Wood Brothers Racing | Ford | 293 | 0 | running | 112 | $47,265 |
| 18 | 36 | 99 | Jeff Burton | Roush Racing | Ford | 292 | 0 | running | 109 | $78,216 |
| 19 | 30 | 17 | Matt Kenseth | Roush Racing | Ford | 292 | 0 | running | 106 | $43,640 |
| 20 | 8 | 25 | Jerry Nadeau | Hendrick Motorsports | Chevrolet | 292 | 0 | running | 103 | $47,170 |
| 21 | 25 | 6 | Mark Martin | Roush Racing | Ford | 292 | 1 | running | 105 | $76,606 |
| 22 | 33 | 93 | Dave Blaney | Bill Davis Racing | Dodge | 292 | 0 | running | 97 | $34,740 |
| 23 | 7 | 9 | Bill Elliott | Evernham Motorsports | Dodge | 292 | 0 | running | 94 | $59,148 |
| 24 | 22 | 33 | Joe Nemechek | Andy Petree Racing | Chevrolet | 291 | 0 | running | 91 | $62,380 |
| 25 | 6 | 15 | Michael Waltrip | Dale Earnhardt, Inc. | Chevrolet | 291 | 0 | running | 88 | $41,795 |
| 26 | 32 | 19 | Casey Atwood (R) | Evernham Motorsports | Dodge | 291 | 0 | running | 85 | $30,685 |
| 27 | 20 | 32 | Ricky Craven | PPI Motorsports | Ford | 290 | 0 | running | 82 | $30,500 |
| 28 | 42 | 90 | Hut Stricklin | Donlavey Racing | Ford | 290 | 0 | running | 79 | $30,345 |
| 29 | 38 | 4 | Robby Gordon | Morgan–McClure Motorsports | Chevrolet | 288 | 0 | running | 76 | $33,140 |
| 30 | 27 | 97 | Kurt Busch (R) | Roush Racing | Ford | 288 | 0 | running | 73 | $41,010 |
| 31 | 41 | 27 | Kenny Wallace | Eel River Racing | Pontiac | 287 | 0 | running | 70 | $29,855 |
| 32 | 35 | 7 | Mike Wallace | Ultra Motorsports | Ford | 287 | 0 | running | 67 | $37,725 |
| 33 | 28 | 66 | Todd Bodine | Haas-Carter Motorsports | Ford | 285 | 0 | running | 64 | $29,545 |
| 34 | 16 | 8 | Dale Earnhardt Jr. | Dale Earnhardt, Inc. | Chevrolet | 285 | 0 | running | 61 | $64,138 |
| 35 | 43 | 45 | Kyle Petty | Petty Enterprises | Dodge | 285 | 0 | running | 58 | $29,285 |
| 36 | 31 | 11 | Brett Bodine | Brett Bodine Racing | Ford | 284 | 0 | running | 55 | $29,155 |
| 37 | 15 | 31 | Mike Skinner | Richard Childress Racing | Chevrolet | 281 | 0 | crash | 52 | $61,374 |
| 38 | 18 | 5 | Terry Labonte | Hendrick Motorsports | Chevrolet | 280 | 0 | crash | 49 | $61,655 |
| 39 | 40 | 01 | Jason Leffler (R) | Chip Ganassi Racing with Felix Sabates | Dodge | 263 | 0 | handling | 46 | $36,800 |
| 40 | 1 | 24 | Jeff Gordon | Hendrick Motorsports | Chevrolet | 228 | 72 | engine | 48 | $85,052 |
| 41 | 39 | 44 | Buckshot Jones | Petty Enterprises | Dodge | 214 | 0 | engine | 40 | $36,500 |
| 42 | 24 | 14 | Ron Hornaday Jr. (R) | A. J. Foyt Enterprises | Pontiac | 149 | 0 | crash | 37 | $28,375 |
| 43 | 29 | 92 | Stacy Compton | Melling Racing | Dodge | 113 | 0 | crash | 34 | $28,267 |
Official race results

== Standings after the race ==
| | Pos | Driver | Points |
|---|---|---|---|
| 1 | 1 | Dale Jarrett | 756 |
| 2 | 2 | Sterling Marlin | 691 (–65) |
| | 3 | Johnny Benson Jr. | 691 (–65) |
| 3 | 4 | Jeff Gordon | 661 (–95) |
| 8 | 5 | Steve Park | 615 (–141) |
| 3 | 6 | Ricky Rudd | 609 (–147) |
| 1 | 7 | Rusty Wallace | 606 (–150) |
| 3 | 8 | Michael Waltrip | 597 (–159) |
| 3 | 9 | Bill Elliott | 589 (–167) |
| | 10 | Ken Schrader | 585 (–171) |

| Previous race: 2001 Cracker Barrel Old Country Store 500 | NASCAR Winston Cup Series; 2001 season | Next race: 2001 Food City 500 |
