= Brett Bodine Racing =

Former American stock car racing team

- Owner: Brett Bodine
- Base: North Carolina
- Series: Winston Cup; Busch Series
- Manufacturer: Ford
- Opened: 1996
- Closed: 2003

Career
- Drivers' Championships: 0
- Race victories: 0

Brett Bodine Racing was a NASCAR racing team from 1996 until 2003. It was owned by former NASCAR driver Brett Bodine and his then-wife Diane, and fielded the No. 11 car for Bodine, who purchased the team from Junior Johnson & Associates (for whom he had driven for in 1995) during the 1995–96 offseason. In purchasing the team Brett joined his brother Geoff as an owner-driver, Geoff having purchased the assets of AK Racing after Alan Kulwicki (also an owner-driver) was killed in a plane crash on April 1, 1993.

The team closed following the 2003 season after failing to find a full-time sponsor.

== Cup Series ==
=== Car No. 11 history ===
Brett Bodine drove the 11 car for Junior Johnson in 1995 with Lowe's sponsorship and drove the car again with Lowe's sponsorship in 1996 as an owner/driver. Brett's team struggled with consistency that season but they did manage to finish 24th in the points standings, with one top-ten. After the season, Lowe's left to sponsor the No. 31 at Richard Childress Racing and Bodine's sponsorship woes began.

1997 saw Brett sign a long term sponsorship deal that would put Close Call Phone Cards on the car. The season started off well with Bodine achieving two top-ten finishes in the first nine races. However, just half-way into the season Close-Call stopped paying its sponsorship bills and Brett was forced to strip the decals off of his car. The car ran unsponsored for the remainder of the season and Bodine was forced to sell part of the team to Andy Evans, although he later re-acquired full interest. Bodine later accused Evans of trying to steal his team.

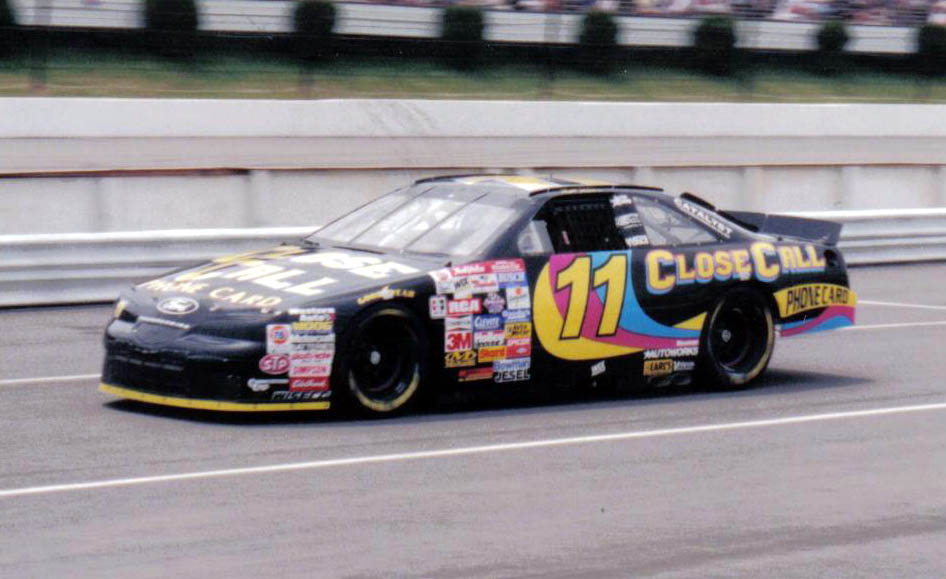
Bodine's No. 11 at Pocono Raceway in 1997

1998 and 1999 found Bodine with reliable sponsorship from Paychex on his new Ford Taurus. He found modest success in 1998 finishing 25th overall in points, despite failing to finish in the top ten all season. He did, however, manage to finish in the top-20 on eleven occasions while also earning $1 million for the first time.

After 1998, Bodine struggled in 1999. He was only able to reach 35th-place in the final standing, again with no top-tens and only four top-20s. The No. 11 team also failed to qualify for two events and Paychex chose not to return at the end of the season.

Without a sponsor having been found, Brett sold half-interest in his team once again, this time to Richard Hilton. As part of the deal Ralphs would come on as the primary sponsor. Although the sale of the team fell through Brett was able to retain the Ralphs sponsorship. However, the team reached only 35th place in the final points standings with no top-tens and just five top-20s. They failed to qualify for five of the races.

Despite this, Ralphs came back to the team in 2001 as the primary sponsor and Brett signed RedCell Batteries as an associate, and the team received engines from Robert Yates Racing. But another blow to the organization RedCell stopped paying its dues midseason, and the team once again was forced to go without strong backing. They were able to work through these troubles and had a very successful season. They qualified for every race, finished in the top-ten twice, the top-20 nine times, and moved up five spots to 30th in the points standings.

Despite the team's success in 2001 a primary sponsor was not forthcoming for 2002. Brett entered the season with just the associates Timberland Pro and Wells Fargo Financial. Dura Lube came on to help out early in the season until Brett picked up Hooters sponsorship for the fourth race of the season. At the start of the 2002 season, the team were way behind in all aspects due to securing sponsorship so late in the season. Brett managed no top tens, only four top-20s, and 36th in the final standings while missing four races.

Hooters came back in 2003, but with far less money. The team scaled back to only a limited schedule. Geoff Bodine drove the car in the Bud Shootout at Daytona and Brett ran five early season races before Hooters pulled the plug, leaving the team with no sponsor. To compound problems, that same weekend in practice Brett was involved in a horrifying crash that sidelined him for several weeks. His brother Geoff drove the No. 11 Ford for his injured brother in its final race, finishing 39th. With no major sponsorship for his team and most of his employees laid off, Brett attempted to run at Indy in a fan-sponsored "Brick Car" where, for $500, fans would get their name on the car. The program was a success, but Brett failed to qualify for the race by 0.001 seconds. No sponsor was found and the team was sold.

==== Car No. 11 results ====
NASCAR Winston Cup Series results
Year	Driver	No.	Make	1	2	3	4	5	6	7	8	9	10	11	12	13	14	15	16	17	18	19	20	21	22	23	24	25	26	27	28	29	30	31	32	33	34	35	36	Owners	Pts
1996	Brett Bodine	11	Ford	DAY; 32	CAR; 28	RCH; 25	ATL; 24	DAR; 27	BRI; 20	NWS; 23	MAR; 18	TAL; 23	SON; 20	CLT; 24	DOV; 24	POC; 40	MCH; 22	DAY; 9	NHA; 16	POC; 27	TAL; 22	IND; 22	GLN; 14	MCH; 28	BRI; 14	DAR; 28	RCH; 25	DOV; 27	MAR; DNQ	NWS; 23	CLT; 28	CAR; 16	PHO; 26	ATL; 21							
1997	Brett Bodine	11	Ford	DAY; 18	CAR; 17	RCH; 23	ATL; 18	DAR; 35	TEX; 19	BRI; 10	MAR; 27	SON; 6	TAL; 33	CLT; 26	DOV; 33	POC; 25	MCH; 19	CAL; 26	DAY; 23	NHA; 42	POC; 29	IND; 18	GLN; 39	MCH; 31	BRI; 31	DAR; 15	RCH; 21	NHA; 33	DOV; 26	MAR; 17	CLT; 30	TAL; 22	CAR; DNQ	PHO; 33	ATL; 41					29th	2747
1998	Brett Bodine	11	Ford	DAY; 24	CAR; 16	LVS; 26	ATL; 26	DAR; 22	BRI; 11	TEX; 16	MAR; 13	TAL; 11	CAL; 28	CLT; 22	DOV; 16	RCH; 20	MCH; 33	POC; 18	SON; 32	NHA; 28	POC; 38	IND; 33	GLN; 34	MCH; 32	BRI; 26	NHA; 30	DAR; 42	RCH; 19	DOV; 22	MAR; 34	CLT; 19	TAL; 13	DAY; 25	PHO; 43	CAR; 31	ATL; 31				25th	2907
1999	Brett Bodine	11	Ford	DAY; 22	CAR; 33	LVS; 20	ATL; 33	DAR; 30	TEX; 18	BRI; 22	MAR; 14	TAL; 43	CAL; 28	RCH; 38	CLT; 22	DOV; 37	MCH; 30	POC; 26	SON; 31	DAY; 34	NHA; 31	POC; 26	IND; DNQ	GLN; 40	MCH; DNQ	BRI; 12	DAR; 26	RCH; 31	NHA; 29	DOV; 29	MAR; 42	CLT; 27	TAL; 31	CAR; 43	PHO; 42	HOM; 40	ATL; 30			37th	2398
2000	Brett Bodine	11	Ford	DAY; DNQ	CAR; 35	LVS; DNQ	ATL; 16	DAR; 27	BRI; 22	TEX; 23	MAR; 36	TAL; DNQ	CAL; 41	RCH; 38	CLT; 30	DOV; 28	MCH; 36	POC; 32	SON; 30	DAY; DNQ	NHA; 20	POC; 30	IND; 39	GLN; DNQ	MCH; 42	BRI; 28	DAR; 27	RCH; 35	NHA; 42	DOV; 20	MAR; 41	CLT; 32	TAL; 26	CAR; 26	PHO; 20	HOM; 14	ATL; 28			36th	2267
2001	Brett Bodine	11	Ford	DAY; 15	CAR; 27	LVS; 38	ATL; 26	DAR; 36	BRI; 27	TEX; 28	MAR; 36	TAL; 26	CAL; 27	RCH; 39	CLT; 17	DOV; 25	MCH; 33	POC; 37	SON; 13	DAY; 9	CHI; 19	NHA; 13	POC; 33	IND; 37	GLN; 13	MCH; 40	BRI; 26	DAR; 27	RCH; 43	DOV; 28	KAN; 25	CLT; 28	MAR; 40	TAL; 12	PHO; 26	CAR; 35	HOM; 32	ATL; 36	NHA; 8	35th	2948
2002	Brett Bodine	11	Ford	DAY; 16	CAR; 30	LVS; 35	ATL; 38	DAR; 38	BRI; 36	TEX; 38	MAR; 26	TAL; 13	CAL; 23	RCH; 19	CLT; 27	DOV; 34	POC; 24	MCH; 34	SON; 24	DAY; 38	CHI; 30	NHA; 27	POC; 33	IND; 42	GLN; 32	MCH; 38	BRI; 32	DAR; 39	RCH; 20	NHA; 36	DOV; DNQ	KAN; DNQ	TAL; 29	CLT; 26	MAR; 38	ATL; 34	CAR; 36	PHO; DNQ	HOM; DNQ	40th	2388
2003	Brett Bodine	11	Ford	DAY; DNQ	CAR	LVS	ATL; 41	DAR	BRI; 24	TEX; 31	TAL; DNQ	MAR	CAL	RCH; 31	CLT; DNQ	DOV; 42	POC	MCH; INQ^{†}						IND; DNQ	GLN	MCH	BRI	DAR	RCH	NHA	DOV	TAL	KAN	CLT	MAR	ATL	PHO	CAR	HOM	46th	469
2003	Geoff Bodine	11	Ford															MCH; 39	SON	DAY	CHI	NHA	POC																	46th	469
^{†} - Qualified but replaced by Geoff Bodine

=== Car No. 09 history ===
2001 saw Brett Bodine Racing expand to a two car team for two races. Driven by the No. 11's car success, Brett was able to field a second car, driven by brother Geoff, at both Bristol and Homestead with sponsorship from Smirnoff Ice and Miccosukee Casino, respectively. Bodine finished 27th at Bristol and 37th at Homestead. The team was to continue to run a limited schedule in 2002 but was never able to find a primary sponsor. The No. 09 Brett Bodine Racing Fords never returned to the track, with the team number being reassigned to Phoenix Racing.

==== Car No. 09 results ====
NASCAR Winston Cup Series results
Year	Driver	No.	Make	1	2	3	4	5	6	7	8	9	10	11	12	13	14	15	16	17	18	19	20	21	22	23	24	25	26	27	28	29	30	31	32	33	34	35	36	Owners	Pts
2001	Geoff Bodine	09	Ford	DAY	CAR	LVS	ATL	DAR	BRI	TEX	MAR	TAL	CAL	RCH	CLT	DOV	MCH	POC	SON	DAY	CHI	NHA	POC	IND	GLN	MCH	BRI; 27	DAR	RCH	DOV	KAN	CLT	MAR	TAL	PHO	CAR	HOM; 37	ATL	NHA	61st	52

=== Car No. 27 history ===
In 2002, Hooters had a small sponsorship deal with independent driver Kirk Shelmerdine. When Hooters signed on to sponsor the Brett Bodine Racing team, part of the deal involved Bodine was to run Shelmerdine in a couple of races in the No. 27 sponsored by Naturally Fresh Foods. However, this quickly came to end when Shelmerdine was unable to make a race, and the drivers went their own ways.

== Busch Series ==
=== Car No. 11 history ===
This car made its debut at Richmond in 2001 with Josh Richeson, a relative of Brett's, behind the wheel. The car's numbers were 6 and 06. In 2002, the car's number was changed to 11 and Bodine was able to field Josh in seven races. The car was unsponsored in two events, sponsored by Smuckers in one event and by one of Bodine's cup sponsors, Timberland Pro, in the other four events. 28th was the best ever finish by this car, achieved in its final start at Richmond in 2002. The team did not have the financial means to run a Busch Series operation in 2003.
