= Ron Hornaday Jr. =

American racing driver (born 1958)

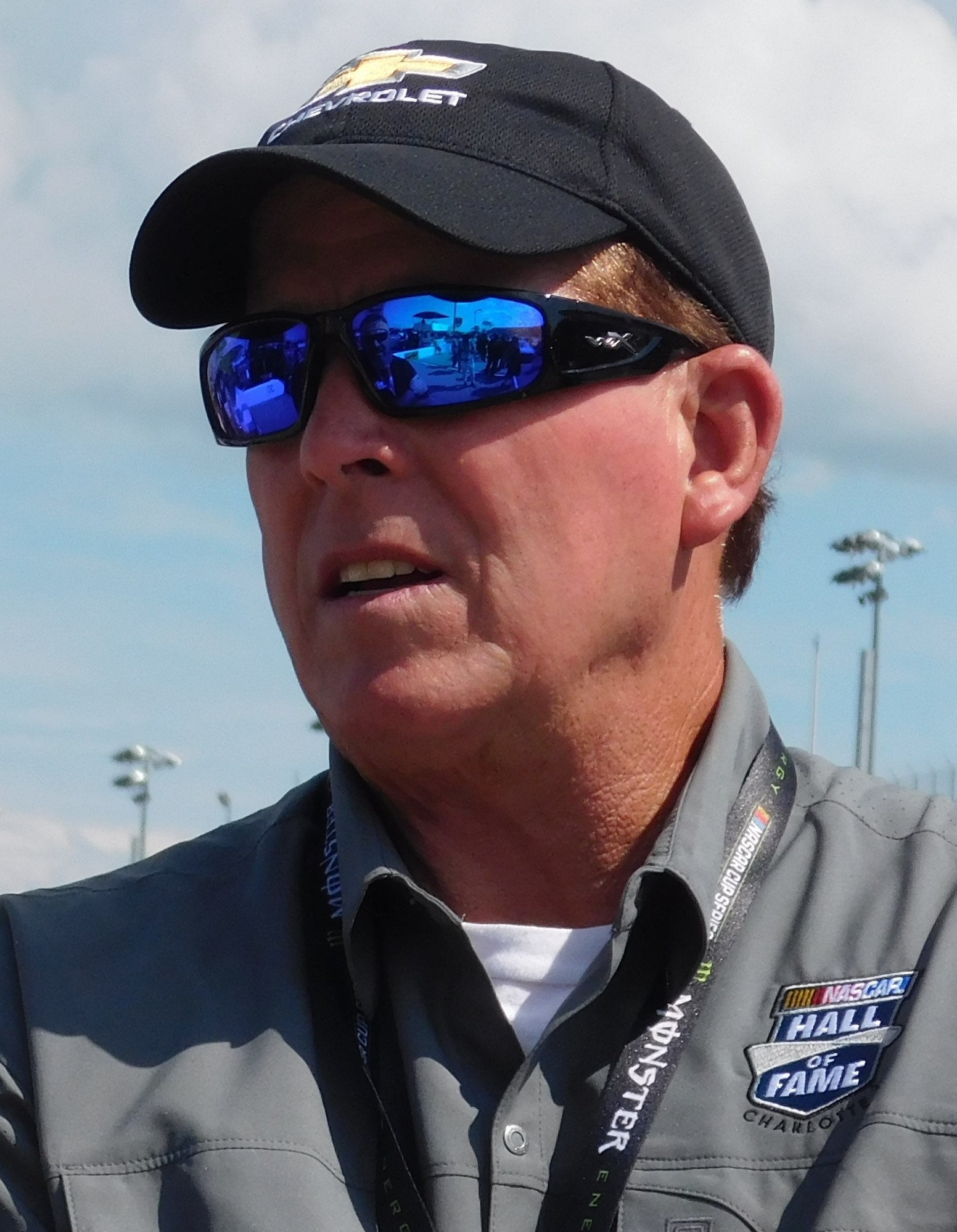
- Hornaday at Darlington Raceway in 2017
- Born: Ronald Lee Hornaday Jr. June 20, 1958 (age 68); Palmdale, California, U.S.
- Achievements: Most NASCAR Craftsman Truck Series Championships (4); 1996, 1998, 2007, 2009 NASCAR Camping World Truck Series Champion; 1992, 1993 NASCAR Featherlite Southwest Tour Champion; 1994 NASCAR SuperTruck Series Exhibition Winner; 1995 Copper World Classic Late Model Winner
- Awards: 2000 NASCAR Busch Series Most Popular Driver; 1997, 2005 NASCAR Craftsman Truck Series Most Popular Driver; 1992 NASCAR Featherlite Southwest Tour Most Popular Driver; West Coast Stock Car Hall of Fame (2013); NASCAR Hall of Fame (2018); Named one of NASCAR's 75 Greatest Drivers (2023)

NASCAR Cup Series career
- 46 races run over 11 years
- 2015 position: 51st
- Best finish: 38th (2001)
- First race: 1992 Save Mart 300K (Sonoma)
- Last race: 2015 Folds of Honor QuikTrip 500 (Atlanta)
Wins	Top tens	Poles
0	1	0

NASCAR O'Reilly Auto Parts Series career
- 184 races run over 14 years
- Best finish: 3rd (2003)
- First race: 1998 First Union 200 (Nazareth)
- Last race: 2011 WYPALL 200 (Phoenix)
- First win: 2000 Econo Lodge 200 (Nazareth)
- Last win: 2004 Alan Kulwicki 250 (Milwaukee)
Wins	Top tens	Poles
4	70	1

NASCAR FedEx Freight Truck Series career
- 360 races run over 17 years
- 2014 position: 14th
- Best finish: 1st (1996, 1998, 2007, 2009)
- First race: 1995 Skoal Bandit Copper World Classic (Phoenix)
- Last race: 2014 WinStar World Casino & Resort 350 (Texas)
- First win: 1995 Racing Champions 200 (Tucson)
- Last win: 2011 Smith's 350 (Las Vegas)
Wins	Top tens	Poles
51	234	27
- Statistics up to date as of July 25, 2023.

Ronald Lee Hornaday Jr. (born June 20, 1958) is an American former professional stock car racing driver and businessman. He currently owns Team Hornaday Development, a driver development program, as well as Hornaday Race Cars, a Dirt Modified chassis builder. He is also the father of former NASCAR driver Ronnie Hornaday and son of the late Ron Hornaday Sr., a two-time NASCAR Winston West Series Champion. Hornaday himself is a four-time champion in the NASCAR Truck Series, his most recent coming in 2009 and is a NASCAR Featherlite Southwest Tour Champion. He was noticed by Dale Earnhardt while participating in the NASCAR Winter Heat on TNN.

== Racing career ==
=== Beginnings ===
Hornaday was born in Palmdale, California, and began racing in go-karts and motorcycles early in his career. Eventually, he moved up to race stock cars at Saugus Speedway. In 1992, he won his first championship in the Southwest Series as well as winning the Most Popular Driver award. He won the Southwest championship the next year as well, becoming the only driver to do so in series history until Jim Pettit won back-to-back titles in 2004–2005. Pettit won the title again in 2011 in the SRL Southwest Tour Series.

Hornaday made his Winston Cup debut in 1992 at the Save Mart 300K, where he started seventeenth but finished 32nd in Bob Fisher's No. 92 Chevrolet. He made another start later that year at Phoenix International Raceway, where he finished 25th. He ran at Phoenix the next year as well, finishing 22nd in the No. 76 Spears Motorsports car.

=== 1995–1999 ===
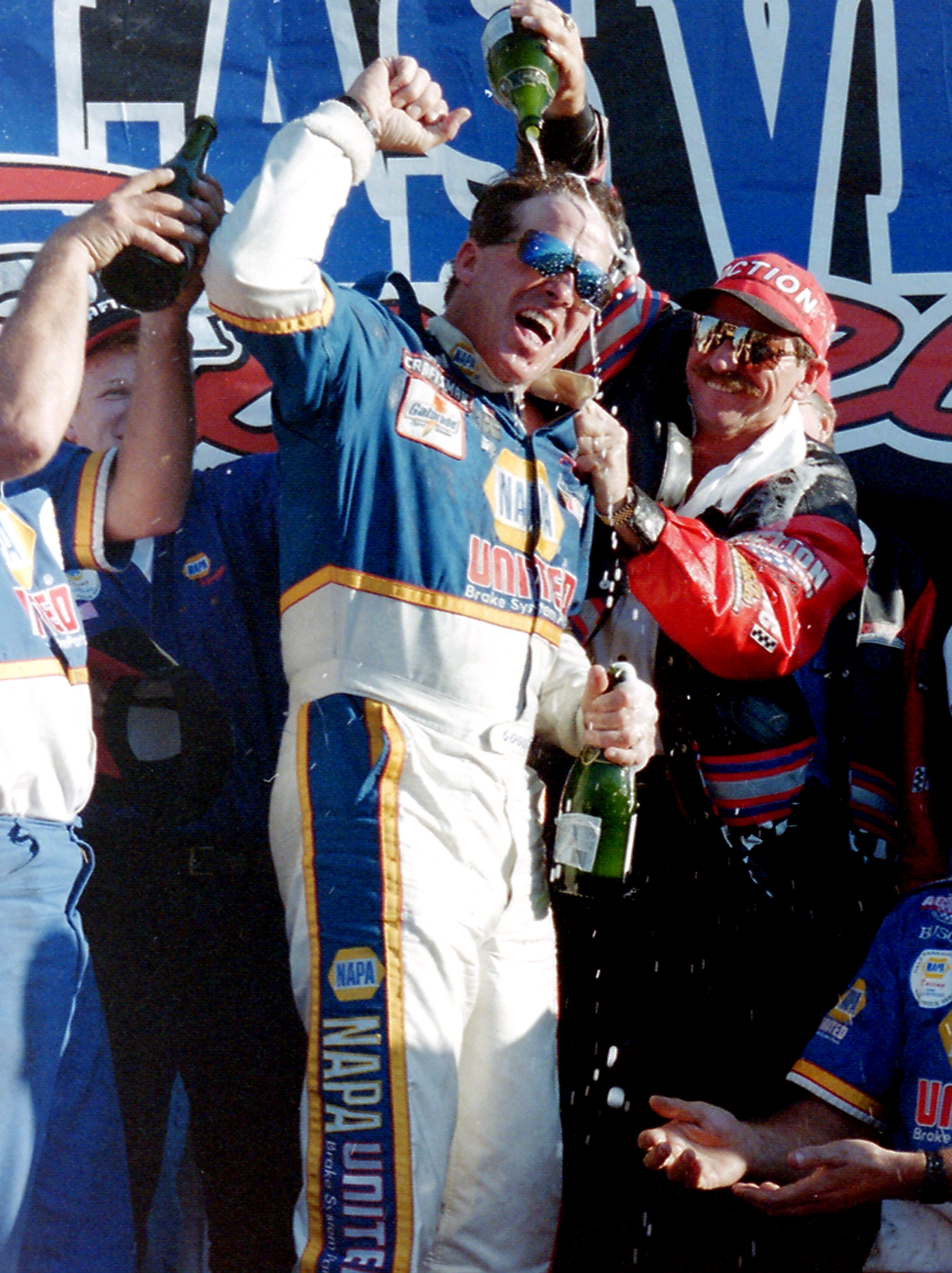
Hornaday celebrating his championship with owner Dale Earnhardt

Hornaday signed to drive the No. 16 RCCA Products / Papa John's Pizza Chevrolet C/K owned by Dale Earnhardt, Inc. for the then-start-up Super Truck Series. In the first season of competition, Hornaday won six races and four poles on his way to a third place points finish. The next year, with sponsorship from NAPA Auto Parts, Hornaday won four races and the series championship.

In 1997, despite seven wins, two of which came by leading every lap in the race, he finished fifth in points. He was able to reclaim his title in 1998 by garnering six wins and sixteen top-fives out of 27 races. At Memphis 200 he celebrated with a burnout, which was unusual at the time, and made team owner Dale Earnhardt angry for risking damaging the powertrain.

Also in 1998, Hornaday made his Busch Series debut, driving four races for ST Motorsports, his best finish an eighth at Pikes Peak International Raceway. He also debuted a Winston Cup car for Tim Beverly at Sonoma, finishing fourteenth in the No. 17 NAPA Chevy. Hornaday came close to a truck victory at Watkins Glen in the 1998 Parts America 150 in which he led all but twelve laps, only to lose the race due to a final-lap penalty for jumping the restart; Hornaday would pull into victory lane post-race only to be told that he had in fact finished fourth.

In 1999, Hornaday won the one-hundredth race ran in NASCAR Craftsman Truck Series history at the Evergreen Speedway in Monroe, Washington. He was one of four drivers entered in the race that competed in every truck race since its inception at the time for an extra $100,000 if he won, which he did. However, he was unable to capitalize on it and win the championship, finishing seventh in the final standings after an up and down year. Fortunately, he was given an opportunity late in the year to replace Dale Earnhardt Jr. in driving the No. 3 NAPA Chevy for DEI's Busch program with Earnhardt moving up to the Cup Series, and he announced that he would do so the following year.

=== 2000–2004 ===
Hornaday began racing full-time in the Busch Series in 2000. He picked up wins at Nazareth Speedway and Indianapolis Raceway Park and finished fifth in points, runner-up to Kevin Harvick for Rookie of the Year honors. He was also voted Most Popular Driver. However, Earnhardt elected to move Hornaday's team up to the Cup Series in 2001 and hire Michael Waltrip to drive the car, and Hornaday was released.

Hornaday signed with A. J. Foyt Racing in the Cup Series, driving the No. 14 Conseco Pontiac Grand Prix. Despite posting a 9th-place finish at Las Vegas, Hornaday struggled throughout the year and finished 38th in points with just two top-twenty finishes and four DNQ's in the second half of the season. Hornaday later criticized Foyt for dismissing him so late in the season, although Foyt unsuccessfully offered Hornaday a Cup Series return in mid-2002. During the 2001 season, Hornaday returned to the Busch Series on a part-time basis, running the No. 11 for HighLine Performance Group before finishing out the year with The Curb Agajanian Performance Group, posting three top-tens.

In 2002, Hornaday drove for Hendrick Motorsports' truck team at the season-opening Florida Dodge Dealers 250, where he finished 12th. After Hendrick closed the doors to its truck team, Hornaday moved to their Busch program, filling in for an injured Ricky Hendrick in the No. 5 GMAC Chevy, his best finish fifteenth at Darlington Raceway. A few races later, he replaced Lyndon Amick in the No. 26 Dr Pepper car for Carroll Racing. He had eight top-tens and a pole, finishing eighteenth in points despite only running thirty of the 36 races. He also capped the season off with a win in the Truck Series at Homestead-Miami Speedway, driving for Xpress Motorsports.

In 2003, Hornaday signed to drive the No. 2 ACDelco Chevy for Richard Childress Racing. He won at Nazareth and posted seventeen top-tens, finishing third in points. Hornaday was noted for his consistency in 2003, as he finished all 34 races and completed all but thirty laps run over the entire season. In 2004, he followed up with a win at The Milwaukee Mile and sixteen more top-ten finishes. Hornaday again finished all the races he started and finished fourth in points.

=== 2005–2011 ===
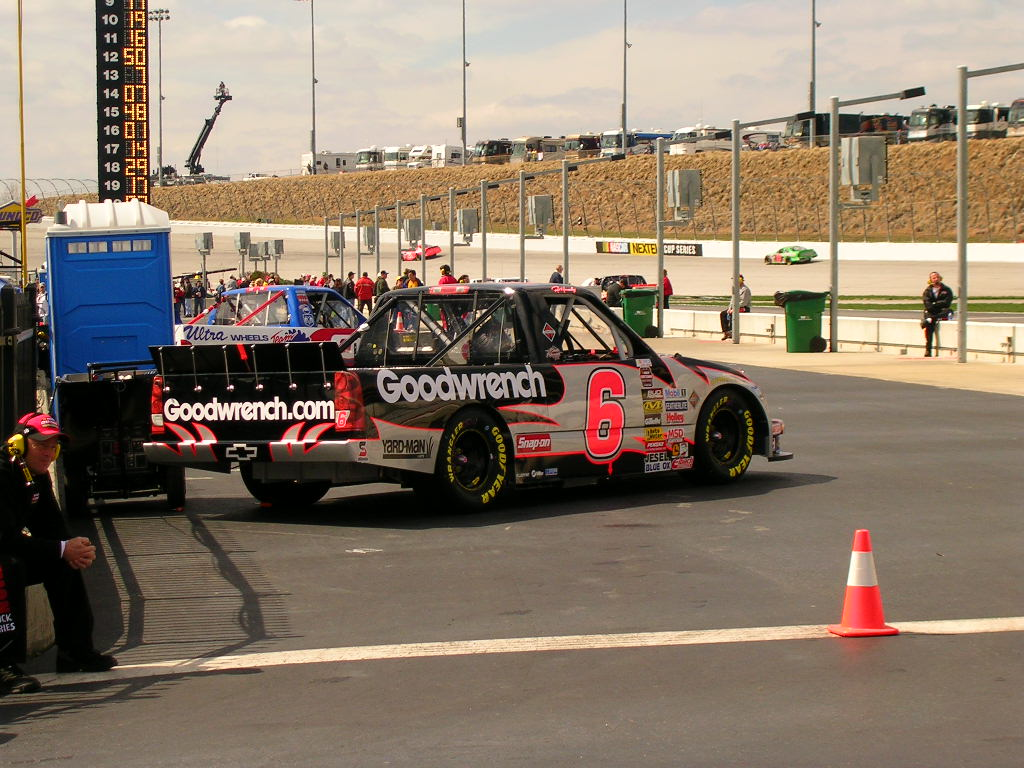
Hornaday's No. 6 truck at Atlanta Motor Speedway in 2005

At the end of 2004, Hornaday was released in favor of Clint Bowyer, and he returned to the Truck Series full-time. He reunited with a long-time best friend of his, Kevin Harvick, and signed to drive the No. 6 GM Goodwrench Chevy for Kevin Harvick Incorporated. Hornaday soon picked up a win at Atlanta Motor Speedway and finished fifth in points. In 2006, the team lost its Goodwrench sponsorship and switched to the No. 33 to field the No. 6 to Mark Martin's Roush Racing effort. Running unsponsored for most of the year, Hornaday picked up two victories this year at Mansfield and Kentucky. He also had two top-tens in five Busch Series starts that year.

With sponsorship backing from Camping World, Hornaday continued his dominance in the Truck Series in 2007, winning races at two tracks for the first time in his career. He took the checkers at Lowe's in the Quaker Steak & Lube 200. Two weeks later, after a what-should-have-been-a-win-weekend at Mansfield, Hornaday outlasted Kyle Busch to win the AAA Insurance 200 at Dover. He continued his chase for a third title with a victory at O'Reilly Raceway Park in the Power Stroke Diesel 200, his 17th win on a short track.

On November 16, 2007, Hornaday won his third NASCAR Craftsman Truck Series Championship by overcoming a 29-point deficit on Mike Skinner.

On September 10, 2008, ESPN's Shaun Assael reported Hornaday admitted to using testosterone cream. He used it to treat Graves' disease. On December 21, 2008, Hornaday's father Ron Hornaday Sr., died due to cancer.

On June 20, 2009, Hornaday won the Copart 200 at the Milwaukee Mile on his 51st birthday. He is one of the few racing drivers to win a race on his birthday. On July 24, 2009, Hornaday became the first Camping World Truck Series driver to win four races in a row by winning at O'Reilly Raceway Park. On August 1, 2009, he won the Toyota Tundra 200 at Nashville Superspeedway, tying Richard Petty and Bobby Allison as the only drivers to win five consecutive races in their NASCAR careers.

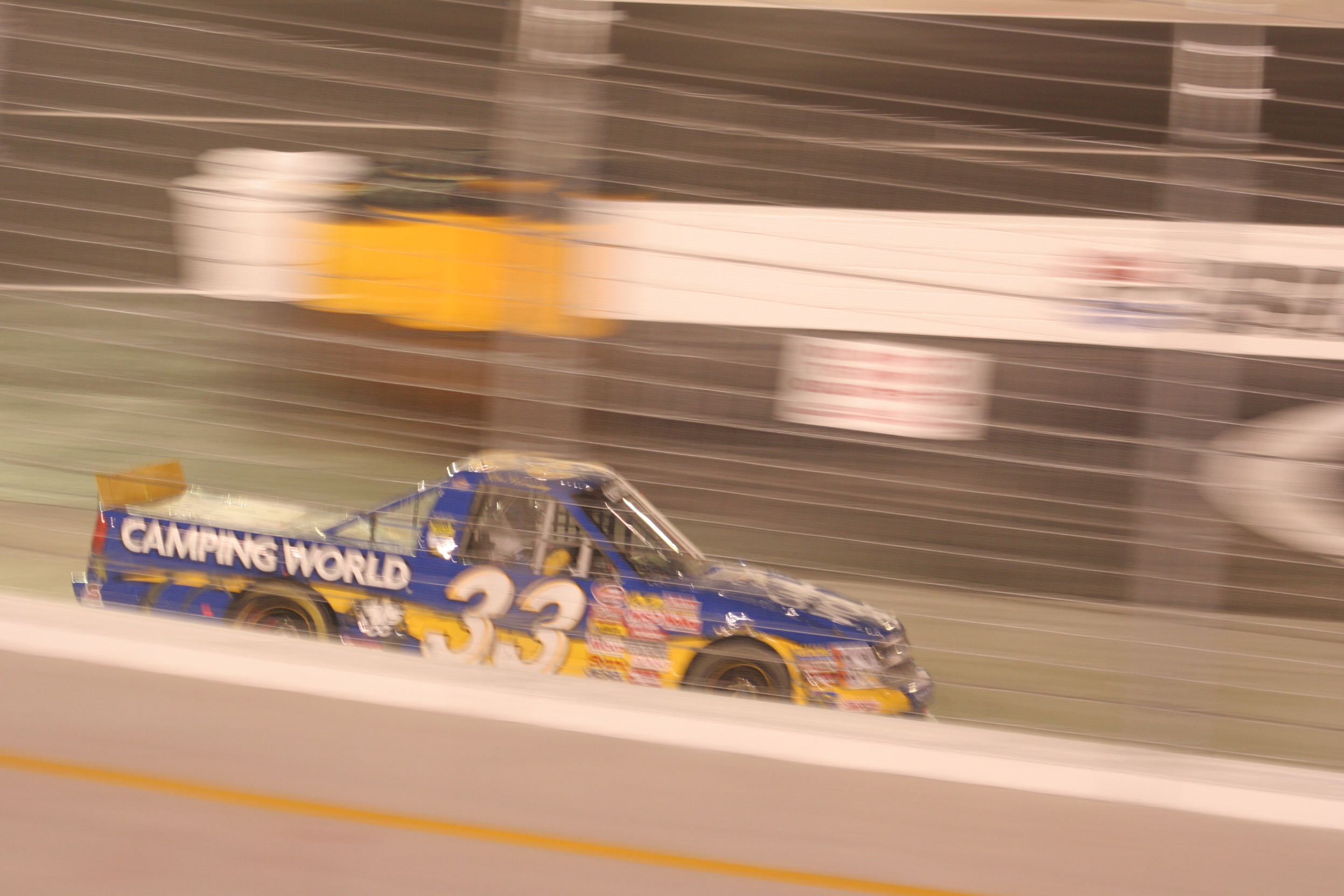
2007 championship-winning Truck

On November 13, 2009, Hornaday won his fourth Camping World Truck Series championship, joining Jeff Gordon, Richard Petty, Dale Earnhardt, and Jimmie Johnson as the only drivers to win four or more titles in the three major series of NASCAR. He also became the first driver since Greg Biffle in 2000 to clinch the title before the last race of the season.

For the final three races of the 2010 Sprint Cup season, Stewart–Haas Racing hired Hornaday as a standby driver should expectant father Ryan Newman have to leave the track. Newman became a father on November 18, 2010, three days before the season finale.

In 2011, Hornaday won four races. However, in the later stages of the season, he struggled with consistency, compared to his other seasons. As a result, Hornaday drove three races in the No. 2 KHI truck, to help the team catch up in the standings. By the time he was back in the No. 33 truck, Hornaday was second in the series being 15 points behind Austin Dillon when he reached the penultimate race of the year at Texas. There Hornaday raced behind rival Kyle Busch and reached second place. When Hornaday passed by Busch on lap thirteen, he made contact with Busch to avoid a slowing truck of Johnny Chapman and in the next turn under a caution, Busch intentionally slammed into Hornaday pushing him head-on into the wall. Hornaday was mathematically eliminated from contention for the Truck title. Busch received suspension from the NNS and NSCS race that weekend as a result. Hornaday later said that after hearing Busch's arrogance after the incident, he was going to settle matters with Busch at the end of the race, but was restrained and instead had a phone call with Busch a couple days after that sizzled the feud.

=== 2012–2014 ===
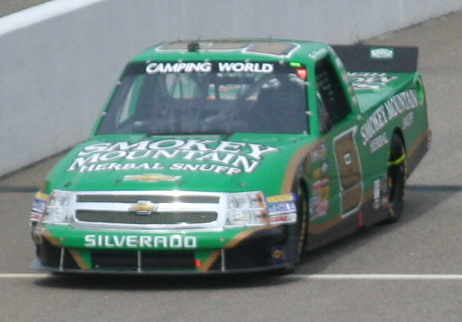
Hornaday in the No. 9 truck at Rockingham Speedway in 2013

During the 2011 season, it was announced that Hornaday would drive for Joe Denette Motorsports for the 2012 season in the No. 9 Anderson's Maple Syrup Chevrolet.

Before the 2013 season, Hornaday returned to JDM, now NTS Motorsports, to drive the No. 9 truck. Hornaday started off on a high note in his finishes with a few Top 10's in the first few races. In the third race of the season at Rockingham Speedway, Hornaday intentionally wrecked rookie Bubba Wallace under caution to retaliate for prior contact. He was penalized during the race to restart in 37th spot. For his actions, Hornaday was fined $25,000, lost 25 points and was placed on probation by NASCAR until June 12. The penalty dropped him from fourth to fifteenth in the Truck Series standings. Although many called for Hornaday to be suspended the same way Kyle Busch was in 2011, NASCAR did not implement a suspension, ruling that although Hornaday's actions were similar, the circumstances between both cases were different.

With one race remaining in the season, Hornaday was released from the No. 9 truck by NTS Motorsports; in the season finale he drove a sixth truck for Turner Scott Motorsports, finishing 5th. He started the 2014 season once again driving for TSM in the No. 30 truck at Daytona International Speedway, with former KHI sponsor Rheem backing the team. Due to an internal dispute within TSM, Hornaday did not race at Canadian Tire Motorsport Park, after it was initially reported that all three truck teams would shut down.

Two days later on September 2, Hornaday was released and Turner Scott Motorsports dissolved the 30 team, with owners Steve Turner and Harry Scott Jr. in the process of filing lawsuits against each other. Hornaday was fourth in points prior to the Canada race, and still sixth in points when he was released. On September 13, it was announced that Rheem would partner again with Hornaday at Las Vegas and Texas later that year with NTS Motorsports, the team that had released him in 2013. He missed six races late in the season and was fourteenth in points at the season's end.

=== Brief Cup Series return ===
On January 21, 2015, Curtis Key's The Motorsports Group announced that Hornaday would be their primary driver for 2015, running the No. 30 Chevy in the Sprint Cup Series. It marked Hornaday's first return to the Cup Series since 2003. The primary sponsor was announced as Hornaday's Truck sponsor, Smokey Mountain Herbal Snuff.

In his first attempt, Hornaday failed to qualify for the Daytona 500 after posting the slowest time in qualifying and then lacking the necessary speed to stay in the draft in his Budweiser Duel race. In his second attempt, Hornaday qualified and made his first race in 12 years. Hornaday finished 42nd due to a breaking in his rear gear. His team skipped the next three races in the West Coast swing to prepare for Martinsville. He did not qualify after wrecking his car during qualifying. After Hornaday once again failed to qualify at Bristol, he and the team parted ways.

On his brief return to Sprint Cup competition and his sudden retirement, Hornaday said in a 2016 interview, "That was helping a team get started and all that stuff. It didn’t seem to work out. I was always the guy, I told my wife that I’m not going to go out there and ride around just for a paycheck. If I wasn’t competitive I wasn’t going to do it. That (opportunity) didn’t work out. But I’ve got a lot of opportunities. People call me and say, ‘Hey, do you want to drive Martinsville?’ I said ‘Yeah, I’d love to.’ And they’d say, ‘Well, how much money can you bring?’ That ain’t racing to me anymore so…it’s back to dirt racing and having fun.”

Hornaday has not raced in NASCAR since. He is currently a dirt modified chassis builder, owning Hornaday Race Cars.

== Recognition ==
April 8, 2010 was declared Ron Hornaday Jr. Day in Palmdale, Hornaday's hometown. A roundabout in the Palmdale Auto Mall was also named after Hornaday on April 8. On May 24, 2017, Hornaday was named in the NASCAR Hall of Fame Class of 2018, becoming the first Truck Series driver to earn this honor.

== Personal life ==
Before his racing career took off, Hornaday worked at a couple transmission shops and his father's car dealership. He got married at age 20. During his time racing for Kevin Harvick Inc. in the Truck Series, Hornaday lost a significant amount of weight in a short period of time, and was taken by Kevin Harvick to a local doctor where he was diagnosed with Graves' disease.

== Motorsports career results ==
=== NASCAR ===
==== Sprint Cup Series ====
(key) (Bold – Pole position awarded by qualifying time. Italics – Pole position earned by points standings or practice time. * – Most laps led

NASCAR Sprint Cup Series results
Year	Team	No.	Make	1	2	3	4	5	6	7	8	9	10	11	12	13	14	15	16	17	18	19	20	21	22	23	24	25	26	27	28	29	30	31	32	33	34	35	36	NWCC	Pts	Ref
1991	Benison Racing	86	Chevy	DAY	RCH	CAR	ATL	DAR	BRI	NWS	MAR	TAL	CLT	DOV	SON	POC	MCH	DAY	POC	TAL	GLN	MCH	BRI	DAR	RCH	DOV	MAR	NWS	CLT	CAR	PHO; DNQ	ATL								NA	-	
1992	Ron Hornaday Jr.	92	Chevy	DAY	CAR	RCH	ATL	DAR	BRI	NWS	MAR	TAL	CLT	DOV	SON; 32	POC	MCH	DAY	POC	TAL	GLN	MCH	BRI	DAR	RCH	DOV	MAR	NWS	CLT	CAR	PHO; 25	ATL								62nd	115	
1993	Spears Motorsports	76	Chevy	DAY	CAR	RCH	ATL	DAR	BRI	NWS	MAR	TAL	SON	CLT	DOV	POC	MCH	DAY	NHA	POC	TAL	GLN	MCH; DNQ	BRI	DAR	RCH	DOV	MAR	NWS	CLT	CAR	PHO; 22	ATL							69th	97	
1994	Spears Motorsports	76	Chevy	DAY	CAR	RCH	ATL	DAR	BRI	NWS	MAR	TAL	SON; 39	CLT	DOV	POC	MCH	DAY	NHA	POC	TAL	IND; DNQ	GLN	MCH	BRI	DAR	RCH	DOV	MAR	NWS	CLT	CAR	PHO; 34	ATL						60th	112	
1995	JTC Racing	45	Chevy	DAY	CAR	RCH	ATL	DAR	BRI	NWS	MAR	TAL	SON	CLT	DOV	POC	MCH	DAY	NHA	POC	TAL	IND	GLN	MCH	BRI	DAR	RCH	DOV	MAR	NWS	CLT	CAR	PHO; 27	ATL						58th	82	
1996	Larry Hedrick Motorsports	41	Chevy	DAY	CAR	RCH	ATL	DAR	BRI	NWS	MAR	TAL	SON; QL^{†}	CLT	DOV	POC	MCH	DAY	NHA	POC	TAL	IND	GLN																	NA	-	
1996	Dale Earnhardt, Inc.	14	Chevy																					MCH; DNQ	BRI	DAR	RCH	DOV	MAR	NWS	CLT	CAR	PHO	ATL						NA	-	
1997	LJ Racing	91	Chevy	DAY	CAR	RCH	ATL	DAR	TEX	BRI	MAR	SON	TAL	CLT	DOV	POC	MCH	CAL	DAY	NHA	POC	IND	GLN	MCH	BRI	DAR	RCH; DNQ	NHA	DOV	MAR	CLT	TAL	CAR	PHO	ATL					NA	-	
1998	Dale Earnhardt, Inc.	1	Chevy	DAY	CAR	LVS	ATL	DAR; DNQ	BRI	TEX	MAR	TAL	CAL	CLT	DOV	RCH	MCH	POC																						60th	121	
1998	Tyler Jet Motorsports	17	Chevy																SON; 14	NHA	POC	IND	GLN	MCH	BRI	NHA	DAR	RCH	DOV	MAR	CLT	TAL	DAY	PHO	CAR	ATL				60th	121	
1999	Midwest Transit Racing	50	Chevy	DAY	CAR	LVS; DNQ	ATL	DAR	TEX	BRI	MAR	TAL	CAL	RCH	CLT	DOV	MCH	POC	SON	DAY	NHA	POC	IND	GLN	MCH	BRI	DAR													63rd	76	
1999	Team SABCO	01	Chevy																									RCH; 29	NHA	DOV	MAR; DNQ	CLT	TAL	CAR	PHO	HOM	ATL			63rd	76	
2000	Hendrick Motorsports	5	Chevy	DAY	CAR	LVS	ATL	DAR	BRI	TEX	MAR	TAL	CAL	RCH	CLT	DOV	MCH	POC	SON	DAY	NHA	POC	IND	GLN; 15	MCH	BRI	DAR	RCH	NHA	DOV	MAR	CLT	TAL	CAR	PHO	HOM	ATL			61st	118	
2001	A. J. Foyt Racing	14	Pontiac	DAY; 17	CAR; 25	LVS; 9	ATL; 39	DAR; 42	BRI; 21	TEX; 40	MAR; 27	TAL; 22	CAL; 34	RCH; 31	CLT; 36	DOV; 35	MCH; 32	POC; 35	SON; 18	DAY; DNQ	CHI; 40	NHA; 34	POC; 30	IND; 34	GLN; 17	MCH; 30	BRI; 29	DAR; 37	RCH; 41	DOV; 34	KAN; DNQ	CLT; 38	MAR; 18		PHO; 30	CAR; 31	HOM; DNQ	ATL; DNQ	NHA; 32	38th	2305	
2001	A. J. Foyt Racing	14	Chevy																															TAL; 38						38th	2305	
2002	CLR Racing	57	Ford	DAY	CAR	LVS	ATL; DNQ	DAR	BRI	TEX; DNQ	MAR	TAL	CAL	RCH																										58th	177	
2002	BAM Racing	49	Dodge												CLT; 36	DOV	POC	MCH	SON	DAY	CHI; DNQ	NHA	POC	IND; DNQ	GLN	MCH	BRI	DAR	RCH	NHA	DOV	KAN								58th	177	
2002	Andy Petree Racing	55	Chevy																														TAL; 32							58th	177	
2002	BH Motorsports	54	Chevy																															CLT; DNQ	MAR	ATL; DNQ	CAR; DNQ			58th	177	
2002	FitzBradshaw Racing	83	Chevy																																			PHO; 36	HOM	58th	177	
2003	Richard Childress Racing	90	Chevy	DAY	CAR	LVS	ATL	DAR	BRI	TEX	TAL	MAR	CAL	RCH	CLT	DOV	POC	MCH	SON	DAY	CHI	NHA	POC	IND	GLN	MCH	BRI	DAR	RCH	NHA	DOV	TAL	KAN	CLT	MAR	ATL	PHO	CAR	HOM; 20	62nd	103	
2015	The Motorsports Group	30	Chevy	DAY; DNQ	ATL; 42	LVS	PHO; Wth	CAL	MAR; DNQ	TEX	BRI; DNQ	RCH	TAL	KAN	CLT	DOV	POC	MCH	SON	DAY	KEN	NHA	IND	POC	GLN	MCH	BRI	DAR	RCH	CHI	NHA	DOV	CLT	KAN	TAL	MAR	TEX	PHO	HOM	51st	2	
^{†} - Qualified for Ricky Craven

===== Daytona 500 =====
Year	Team	Manufacturer	Start	Finish
2001	A. J. Foyt Enterprises	Pontiac	42	17
2015	The Motorsports Group	Chevrolet	DNQ	

==== Nationwide Series ====
NASCAR Nationwide Series results
Year	Team	No.	Make	1	2	3	4	5	6	7	8	9	10	11	12	13	14	15	16	17	18	19	20	21	22	23	24	25	26	27	28	29	30	31	32	33	34	35	NNSC	Pts	Ref
1995	Dale Earnhardt, Inc.	16	Chevy	DAY	CAR	RCH	ATL	NSV	DAR	BRI	HCY	NHA	NZH	CLT	DOV	MYB	GLN	MLW	TAL	SBO	IRP	MCH	BRI	DAR	RCH	DOV	CLT	CAR; DNQ	HOM										NA	-	
1996	Labonte Motorsports	44	Chevy	DAY	CAR	RCH	ATL	NSV	DAR	BRI	HCY	NZH	CLT	DOV	SBO	MYB	GLN	MLW; QL^{†}	NHA	TAL	IRP	MCH	BRI	DAR	RCH	DOV	CLT	CAR	HOM										NA	-	
1998	ST Motorsports	59	Chevy	DAY	CAR	LVS	NSV	DAR	BRI	TEX	HCY	TAL	NHA	NZH; 23	CLT	DOV	RCH	PPR; 8	GLN	MLW; 35	MYB																		61st	391	
1998	ST Motorsports	97	Chevy																			CAL; 22	SBO	IRP	MCH	BRI	DAR	RCH	DOV	CLT	GTY	CAR	ATL	HOM					61st	391	
1999	Dale Earnhardt, Inc.	31	Chevy	DAY; 34	CAR	LVS	ATL	DAR	TEX	NSV	BRI	TAL	CAL	NHA	RCH	NZH	CLT	DOV	SBO	GLN														PHO; 6*	HOM; 12				68th	878	
1999	Dale Earnhardt, Inc.	3	Chevy																		MLW; QL^{‡}	MYB	PPR	GTY															68th	878	
1999	Team Rensi Motorsports	25	Chevy																						IRP; 39	MCH	BRI	DAR	RCH	DOV	CLT	CAR	MEM						68th	878	
2000	Dale Earnhardt, Inc.	3	Chevy	DAY; 32*	CAR; 3	LVS; 8	ATL; 16	DAR; 8	BRI; 18	TEX; 17	NSV; 3	TAL; 20	CAL; 19	RCH; 17	NHA; 20	CLT; 12	DOV; 18	SBO; 4	MYB; 9	GLN; 36	MLW; 10	NZH; 1*	PPR; 9	GTY; 6	IRP; 1	MCH; 30	BRI; 15	DAR; 34	RCH; 37	DOV; 14	CLT; 9	CAR; 11	MEM; 14	PHO; 5	HOM; 38				5th	3870	
2001	HighLine Performance Group	11	Chevy	DAY	CAR	LVS	ATL	DAR	BRI	TEX	NSH	TAL	CAL	RCH	NHA	NZH	CLT	DOV	KEN	MLW; 8	GLN; 10	CHI; 16	GTY	PPR	IRP	MCH; 14	BRI; 27	DAR; 11	RCH; 11	DOV; 26	KAN; 34	CLT	MEM						36th	1346	
2001	Curb Agajanian Motorsports	43	Chevy																															PHO; 4	CAR; 20	HOM; 30			36th	1346	
2002	Hendrick Motorsports	5	Chevy	DAY	CAR	LVS	DAR; 15	BRI; 38	TEX; 12	NSH; 22	TAL; 29	CAL; 17	RCH																										18th	3268	
2002	Carroll Racing	26	Chevy											NHA; 14	NZH; 3	**CLT**; 33	DOV; 6	NSH; 31	KEN; 37	MLW; 4	DAY; 21	CHI; 5	GTY; 2*	PPR; 4	IRP; 10	MCH; 37	BRI; 12	DAR; 38	RCH; 26	DOV; 21	KAN; 34	CLT; 14	MEM; 7	ATL; 16	CAR; 26	PHO; 12	HOM; 26		18th	3268	
2003	Richard Childress Racing	2	Chevy	DAY; 16	CAR; 12	LVS; 9	DAR; 9	BRI; 12	TEX; 17	TAL; 4	NSH; 16	CAL; 10	RCH; 15	GTY; 28	NZH; 1*	CLT; 21	DOV; 10	NSH; 16	KEN; 3	MLW; 4	DAY; 4	CHI; 12	NHA; 8	PPR; 7*	IRP; 8	MCH; 28	BRI; 2	DAR; 11	RCH; 7	DOV; 6	KAN; 14	CLT; 12	MEM; 4	ATL; 13	PHO; 5	CAR; 17	HOM; 15		3rd	4591	
2004	Richard Childress Racing	2	Chevy	DAY; 7	CAR; 10	LVS; 26	DAR; 23	BRI; 9	TEX; 17	NSH; 31	TAL; 3	CAL; 11	GTY; 2	RCH; 12	NZH; 11	CLT; 7	DOV; 29	NSH; 5	KEN; 4	MLW; 1	DAY; 9	CHI; 10	NHA; 6*	PPR; 11	IRP; 35	MCH; 18	BRI; 20	CAL; 29	RCH; 21	DOV; 7	KAN; 5	CLT; 15	MEM; 3	ATL; 14	PHO; 28	DAR; 27	HOM; 7		4th	4258	
2005	Kevin Harvick Incorporated	33	Chevy	DAY	CAL	MXC; 12	LVS																																57th	706	
2005	SKI Motorsports	30	Chevy					ATL; 43	NSH	BRI	TEX	PHO	TAL	DAR	RCH	CLT													BRI; DNQ	CAL; 34	RCH	DOV	KAN	CLT	MEM	TEX; DNQ	PHO; 32	HOM	57th	706	
2005	Braun Racing	32	Chevy														DOV; 37	NSH; 14	KEN	MLW; 15	DAY	CHI	NHA	PPR	GTY	IRP; 14	GLN	MCH											57th	706	
2006	Kevin Harvick Incorporated	33	Chevy	DAY	CAL	MXC	LVS	ATL	BRI; 7	TEX	NSH; 17	PHO; 35	TAL	RCH; 14	DAR	CLT	DOV; 5	NSH	KEN	MLW; 20	DAY	CHI	NHA	MAR; 24	GTY; 20	IRP; 23	GLN	MCH	BRI; 3	CAL	RCH; 41	DOV	KAN	CLT	MEM	TEX; 5	PHO; 9	HOM; 36	35th	1536	
2007	Kevin Harvick Incorporated	77	Chevy	DAY	CAL	MXC	LVS	ATL	BRI	NSH	TEX	PHO	TAL	RCH	DAR	CLT	DOV	NSH	KEN	MLW; 36	NHA	DAY	CHI	GTY; 8	IRP; 5	CGV; 13	GLN	MCH	BRI	CAL	RCH	DOV	KAN	CLT	MEM	TEX	PHO; 10	HOM	64th	615	
2008	Kevin Harvick Incorporated	33	Chevy	DAY	CAL	LVS	ATL	BRI	NSH	TEX	PHO	MXC; 32	TAL	RCH	DAR	CLT	DOV	NSH	KEN	MLW	NHA	DAY	CHI	GTY	IRP	CGV; 4	GLN	MCH	BRI	CAL	RCH	DOV	KAN	CLT	MEM	TEX	PHO	HOM	87th	227	
2009	Kevin Harvick Incorporated	33	Chevy	DAY	CAL	LVS	BRI	TEX	NSH	PHO	TAL	RCH	DAR	CLT	DOV	NSH	KEN	MLW; 9	NHA	DAY	CHI	GTY	IRP; 6	IOW	GLN	MCH	BRI	CGV	ATL	RCH	DOV	KAN	CAL	CLT	MEM	TEX	PHO	HOM	84th	293	
2010	Kevin Harvick Incorporated	33	Chevy	DAY	CAL	LVS	BRI	NSH	PHO	TEX	TAL	RCH	DAR	DOV	CLT	NSH	KEN	ROA; 12	NHA	DAY	CHI	GTY	IRP; 28	IOW	GLN	MCH	BRI	CGV	ATL	RCH	DOV	KAN	CAL	CLT	GTY	TEX	PHO	HOM	92nd	206	
2011	Turner Motorsports	32	Chevy	DAY	PHO	LVS	BRI	CAL	TEX	TAL	NSH	RCH	DAR	DOV	IOW	CLT	CHI	MCH	ROA	DAY	KEN	NHA	NSH	IRP	IOW	GLN	CGV	BRI	ATL	RCH	CHI	DOV	KAN	CLT	TEX	PHO; 13	HOM		90th	0^{1}	
^{‡} - Qualified for Bobby Labonte · ^{†} - Qualified for Dale Earnhardt Jr.

==== Camping World Truck Series ====
NASCAR Camping World Truck Series results
Year	Team	No.	Make	1	2	3	4	5	6	7	8	9	10	11	12	13	14	15	16	17	18	19	20	21	22	23	24	25	26	27	NCWTC	Pts	Ref
1995	Dale Earnhardt, Inc.	16	Chevy	**PHO**; 9	TUS; 1*	SGS; 6	MMR; 1*	POR; 9	EVG; 1*	**I70**; 14	LVL; 16	BRI; 9	MLW; 3	**CNS**; 3*	**HPT**; 1*	IRP; 19	FLM; 1*	RCH; 15	MAR; 13	NWS; 5	**SON**; 1*	MMR; 15*	PHO; 5								3rd	2986	
1996	Dale Earnhardt, Inc.	16	Chevy	HOM; 3	PHO; 5	POR; 1*	EVG; 2	TUS; 3	CNS; 8	**HPT**; 3	BRI; 8	NZH; 5	MLW; 3	LVL; 1*	I70; 4*	IRP; 4	FLM; 6	GLN; 1*	NSV; 2	RCH; 2	NHA; 1	MAR; 4	NWS; 22	SON; 2	**MMR**; 2*	PHO; 7	LVS; 10				1st	3831	
1997	Dale Earnhardt, Inc.	16	Chevy	WDW; 30	TUS; 1	HOM; 6	PHO; 4	POR; 2	EVG; 9	I70; 22	NHA; 29	TEX; 27	**BRI**; 1*	NZH; 24	MLW; 1	LVL; 1*	**CNS**; 1*	HPT; 3*	IRP; 1	FLM; 1*	NSV; 2*	GLN; 5	**RCH**; 16	MAR; 32	SON; 26	MMR; 28*	CAL; 9	PHO; 9	LVS; 3		5th	3574	
1998	Dale Earnhardt, Inc.	16	Chevy	WDW; 1	HOM; 8	PHO; 1	POR; 6	EVG; 2	I70; 6	GLN; 4*	TEX; 24	**BRI**; 1*	MLW; 4	NZH; 1*	CAL; 3*	PPR; 1*	IRP; 28	NHA; 10	FLM; 2	NSV; 7	HPT; 8	LVL; 17	RCH; 22	MEM; 1	GTY; 2	MAR; 3	SON; 23	**MMR**; 4	PHO; 3	LVS; 2	1st	4072	
1999	Dale Earnhardt, Inc.	16	Chevy	HOM; 4	PHO; 1*	EVG; 1*	MMR; 4*	MAR; 16	MEM; 6	PPR; 6	I70; 11	BRI; 18	TEX; 10*	PIR; 27	GLN; 5	MLW; 7	NSV; 23	NZH; 24*	MCH; 9	NHA; 18	IRP; 29	GTY; 21	HPT; 6	RCH; 2	LVS; 3*	LVL; 6	TEX; 10*	CAL; 6*			7th	3488	
2002	Hendrick Motorsports	24	Chevy	DAY; 12	DAR	MAR	GTY	PPR	DOV	TEX	MEM	MLW	KAN	KEN	NHA	MCH	IRP	NSH	RCH	TEX	SBO	LVS	CAL	PHO							53rd	307	
2002	Xpress Motorsports	11	Chevy																						HOM; 1						53rd	307	
2004	Morgan-Dollar Motorsports	47	Chevy	DAY	ATL	MAR	MFD	CLT	DOV	TEX	MEM	MLW	KAN	KEN	GTY	MCH	IRP	NSH	BRI	RCH	NHA	LVS	CAL	TEX	MAR	PHO; 13	DAR	HOM			85th	124	
2005	Kevin Harvick Incorporated	6	Chevy	DAY; 26	CAL; 8	ATL; 1	MAR; 3	GTY; 30	**MFD**; 11*	CLT; 11	DOV; 4*	TEX; 6	MCH; 30	MLW; 4	KAN; 17	KEN; 14	MEM; 21*	IRP; 3	NSH; 12	BRI; 14	RCH; 10	NHA; 5*	LVS; 13	MAR; 9	ATL; 21	TEX; 7	PHO; 2	HOM; 9			4th	3369	
2006	Kevin Harvick Incorporated	33	Chevy	DAY; 23	CAL; 32	ATL; 20	MAR; 14	GTY; 15	CLT; 5	MFD; 1*	DOV; 7	TEX; 15	MCH; 7	**MLW**; 3*	KAN; 12	KEN; 1	MEM; 4	IRP; 3	NSH; 33	BRI; 27	NHA; 6	LVS; 5	TAL; 10	MAR; 13	ATL; 13	TEX; 5	PHO; 13	HOM; 14			7th	3313	
2007	Kevin Harvick Incorporated	33	Chevy	DAY; 7	CAL; 2	ATL; 11	MAR; 6	KAN; 6	CLT; 1*	MFD; 6	DOV; 1*	TEX; 4*	MCH; 10	MLW; 2	MEM; 3	KEN; 10	IRP; 1*	NSH; 2	BRI; 6	GTY; 2*	**NHA**; 1*	LVS; 22	TAL; 7	MAR; 3	**ATL**; 2	TEX; 18	PHO; 2	HOM; 7			1st	3982	
2008	Kevin Harvick Incorporated	33	Chevy	DAY; 25	**CAL**; 5	**ATL**; 2*	MAR; 8	**KAN**; 1*	CLT; 23	MFD; 35	DOV; 3	TEX; 1*	MCH; 23	MLW; 7	MEM; 1*	KEN; 10	IRP; 2*	NSH; 5	BRI; 24	GTY; 1*	NHA; 1*	**LVS**; 5	TAL; 2	**MAR**; 29*	ATL; 2*	TEX; 1	**PHO**; 25	HOM; 8			2nd	3718	
2009	Kevin Harvick Incorporated	33	Chevy	DAY; 5	CAL; 6	ATL; 7	MAR; 2	**KAN**; 4	CLT; 1	**DOV**; 26	TEX; 19*	MCH; 7	MLW; 1*	**MEM**; 1*	**KEN**; 1	IRP; 1*	NSH; 1*	BRI; 3	CHI; 11	IOW; 4	GTY; 17*	NHA; 2*	LVS; 6	MAR; 4	TAL; 17	TEX; 3	PHO; 4	HOM; 8			1st	3959	
2010	Kevin Harvick Incorporated	33	Chevy	DAY; 27	**ATL**; 34	MAR; 2	NSH; 3	**KAN**; 2	DOV; 12	CLT; 3	TEX; 9	MCH; 4	IOW; 24	GTY; 26	IRP; 1*	POC; 29	NSH; 6	DAR; 3	BRI; 3	CHI; 3	KEN; 29	NHA; 24	LVS; 11	MAR; 1	**TAL**; 21*	TEX; 32	PHO; 29	HOM; 2			7th	3310	
2011	Kevin Harvick Incorporated	33	Chevy	DAY; 28	PHO; 3	DAR; 2	MAR; 3	NSH; 4	DOV; 9	CLT; 5	KAN; 30	TEX; 1	KEN; 27	IOW; 19	NSH; 17	IRP; 5	POC; 9	MCH; 7	BRI; 24	ATL; 1	CHI; 10	NHA; 4				MAR; 2	TEX; 34	HOM; 13			4th	838	
2011	Kevin Harvick Incorporated	2	Chevy																				KEN; 1*	**LVS**; 1*	TAL; 2						4th	838	
2012	Joe Denette Motorsports	9	Chevy	DAY; 14	MAR; 16	CAR; 12	KAN; 6	CLT; 5	DOV; 27	TEX; 12	KEN; 9	IOW; 2	CHI; 7	POC; 19	MCH; 17	BRI; 8	ATL; 30	IOW; 33	KEN; 14	LVS; 27	TAL; 28	MAR; 33	TEX; 20	PHO; 22	HOM; 20						13th	591	
2013	NTS Motorsports	9	Chevy	DAY; 3	MAR; 10	CAR; 15	KAN; 9	CLT; 30	DOV; 12	TEX; 12	KEN; 17	IOW; 4	ELD; 28	POC; 6	MCH; 11	BRI; 8	MSP; 5	IOW; 17	CHI; 13	LVS; 6	TAL; 24	MAR; 28	TEX; 3	PHO; 28							14th	612	
2013	Turner Scott Motorsports	34	Chevy																						HOM; 5						14th	612	
2014	Turner Scott Motorsports	30	Chevy	DAY; 5	MAR; 9*	KAN; 8	CLT; 19	DOV; 11	TEX; 6	GTY; 5	KEN; 8	IOW; 21	ELD; 2	POC; 7	MCH; 3	BRI; 3	MSP	CHI	NHA												14th	526	
2014	NTS Motorsports	9	Chevy																	LVS; 20	TAL; 34	MAR	TEX; 12	PHO	HOM						14th	526	

==== Winston West Series ====
NASCAR Winston West Series results
Year	Team	No.	Make	1	2	3	4	5	6	7	8	9	10	11	12	13	14	15	Pos.	Pts	Ref
1989	Sara Vincent	41	Chevy	MAD	MMR	RAS	SON	POR	TCR	EVG	MMR	SGS; 12	SON	PHO					39th	127	
1990	Sellers Racing	8	Buick	MMR	SON	SGS; 18	POR	EVG	RAS	TCR	MMR	PHO							45th	109	
1991	Benison Racing	86	Chevy	EVG	MMR; 22	SON	SGS	POR	EVG; 18	SSS	MMR; 20	PHO; DNQ							18th	451	
1992	Ron Hornaday Jr.	92	Chevy	MMR; 11	**SGS**; 5	SON; 32	SHA; 2	POR; 6	EVG; 22	**SSS**; 2*	**CAJ**; 3	TWS; 7	**MMR**; 4	PHO; 25					5th	1722	
1993	Ron Hornaday Jr.	92	Chevy	TWS	MMR; 21	SGS; 9	SON	TUS; 3*	SHA										17th	694	
1993	Unknown	97	Chevy							EVG; 19	POR	CBS	SSS	CAJ	TCR	MMR			17th	694	
1993	Spears Motorsports	76	Chevy														PHO; 22		17th	694	
1994	Spears Motorsports	75	Chevy	MMR; 8	TUS; 10		**SGS**; 1*	YAK; 2*	MMR; 3	**POR**; 2*	IND; DNQ	CAJ; 1*	TCR; 16	**LVS**; 1*	MMR; 14*		**TUS**; 1		2nd	2167	
1994	Spears Motorsports	76	Chevy			SON; 39										PHO; 34			2nd	2167	
1995	Spears Motorsports	50	Chevy	TUS; 5*	MMR	SON	CNS	MMR	POR	SGS	TUS	AMP	MAD	POR	LVS				31st	321	
1995	Spears Motorsports	45	Chevy													**SON**; 7*	MMR	PHO	31st	321	
1996	Spears Motorsports	45	Chevy	**TUS**; 1	AMP	MMR	SON	MAD	POR	TUS	EVG	CNS; 1	MAD	MMR	SON; 11*	MMR	PHO	LVS	22nd	500	
1998	BMR Motorsports	45	Chevy	TUS	LVS	PHO	CAL; 30	HPT	MMR	AMP	POR	CAL	PPR	EVG	SON	MMR	LVS		89th	73	
1999	Bernie Hilber Racing	53	Pontiac	TUS	LVS; 2														24th	655	
1999	Bernie Hilber Racing	7	Pontiac			PHO; 4	CAL	PPR	MMR	IRW; 4	EVG	POR	IRW	RMR	LVS				24th	655	
1999	Unknown	21	Chevy													MMR; 4	MOT		24th	655	
2001	Bobby Pangonis	97	Chevy	PHO	LVS; 20	TUS	MMR	CAL	IRW	LAG	KAN	EVG	CNS	IRW	RMR	LVS	IRW		63rd	103	

=== ARCA Re/Max Series ===
(key) (Bold – Pole position awarded by qualifying time. Italics – Pole position earned by points standings or practice time. * – Most laps led.)

ARCA Re/Max Series results
Year	Team	No.	Make	1	2	3	4	5	6	7	8	9	10	11	12	13	14	15	16	17	18	19	20	21	22	ARMC	Pts	Ref
1992	Ron Hornaday Jr.	92	Chevy	DAY	FIF	TWS	TAL	TOL	KIL	POC	MCH	FRS	KIL	NSH	DEL	POC	HPT	FRS	ISF	TOL	DSF	TWS; 7	SLM	ATL		NA	0	
1999	Dale Earnhardt Inc.	31	Chevy	DAY	ATL	SLM	AND	CLT	MCH	POC	TOL	SBS	BLN	POC	KIL	FRS	FLM	ISF	WIN	DSF	SLM	CLT	TAL	ATL; 1*		80th	235	
2002	Tinsley Hughes	75	Chevy	DAY	ATL	NSH	SLM	KEN	CLT	KAN	POC	MCH	TOL	SBO	KEN	BLN	POC	NSH	ISF	WIN	DSF	CHI	SLM	TAL	CLT; 2	NA	0	

^{*} Season still in progress
^{1} Ineligible for series points

Sporting positions
Preceded by Mike Skinner; Jack Sprague; Todd Bodine; Johnny Benson Jr.	NASCAR Camping World Truck Series Champion; 1996; 1998; 2007; 2009	Succeeded by Jack Sprague; Jack Sprague; Johnny Benson Jr. Todd Bodine
Preceded by Rick Carelli	NASCAR Featherlite Southwest Tour Champion; 1992, 1993	Succeeded by Steve Portenga
Awards
Preceded by Dale Earnhardt Jr.	NASCAR Busch Series Most Popular Driver; 2000	Succeeded by Kevin Harvick
Preceded by Jimmy Hensley; Steve Park	NASCAR Craftsman Truck Series Most Popular Driver; 1997; 2005	Succeeded by Stacy Compton; Johnny Benson Jr.
