= 2001 NAPA Auto Parts 500 =

Race details
- Race 10 of 36 in the 2001 NASCAR Winston Cup Series
- Track map of the speedway at Auto Club Speedway AKA California Speedway
- Date: April 29, 2001
- Official name: NAPA Auto Parts 500
- Location: California Speedway, Fontana, California
- Course: Permanent racing facility
- Course length: 2.0 miles (3.219 km)
- Distance: 250 laps, 500 mi (804.672 km)
- Average speed: 143.118 miles per hour (230.326 km/h)

Pole position
Driver	Bobby Labonte	Joe Gibbs Racing
- Time: 39.423

Most laps led
Driver	Rusty Wallace	Penske Racing
- Laps: 95

Winner
No. 2	Rusty Wallace	Penske Racing

Television in the United States
- Network: Fox
- Announcers: Mike Joy, Darrell Waltrip and Larry McReynolds

The 2001 NAPA Auto Parts 500 was a NASCAR Winston Cup Series stock car race held on April 29, 2001, at California Speedway in Fontana, California. Contested over 250 laps on the 2-mile (3.2-kilometre) asphalt D-shaped oval, it was the tenth race of the 2001 NASCAR Winston Cup Series season. Rusty Wallace of Penske Racing won the race.

== Background ==
The track, California Speedway, was a four-turn superspeedway that was 2 miles (3.2 kilometres) long. The track's turns were banked at fourteen degrees, while the front stretch, the location of the finish line, was banked at eleven degrees. Unlike the front stretch, the back straightaway was banked at three degrees.

== Entry list ==
- (R) denotes rookie driver.

No.	Driver	Team	Manufacturer
01	Jason Leffler (R)	Chip Ganassi Racing	Dodge
1	Steve Park	Dale Earnhardt, Inc.	Chevrolet
2	Rusty Wallace	Penske Racing South	Ford
4	Kevin Lepage	Morgan-McClure Motorsports	Chevrolet
5	Terry Labonte	Hendrick Motorsports	Chevrolet
6	Mark Martin	Roush Racing	Ford
7	Mike Wallace	Ultra Motorsports	Ford
8	Dale Earnhardt Jr.	Dale Earnhardt, Inc.	Chevrolet
9	Bill Elliott	Evernham Motorsports	Dodge
10	Johnny Benson Jr.	MBV Motorsports	Pontiac
11	Brett Bodine	Brett Bodine Racing	Ford
12	Jeremy Mayfield	Penske Racing South	Ford
14	Ron Hornaday Jr. (R)	A.J. Foyt Racing	Pontiac
15	Michael Waltrip	Dale Earnhardt, Inc.	Chevrolet
17	Matt Kenseth	Roush Racing	Ford
18	Bobby Labonte	Joe Gibbs Racing	Pontiac
19	Casey Atwood (R)	Evernham Motorsports	Dodge
20	Tony Stewart	Joe Gibbs Racing	Pontiac
21	Elliott Sadler	Wood Brothers Racing	Ford
22	Ward Burton	Bill Davis Racing	Dodge
24	Jeff Gordon	Hendrick Motorsports	Chevrolet
25	Jerry Nadeau	Hendrick Motorsports	Chevrolet
26	Jimmy Spencer	Haas-Carter Motorsports	Ford
27	Kenny Wallace	Eel River Racing	Pontiac
28	Ricky Rudd	Robert Yates Racing	Ford
29	Kevin Harvick (R)	Richard Childress Racing	Chevrolet
30	Jeff Green	Richard Childress Racing	Chevrolet
31	Mike Skinner	Richard Childress Racing	Chevrolet
32	Ricky Craven	PPI Motorsports	Ford
33	Joe Nemechek	Andy Petree Racing	Chevrolet
36	Ken Schrader	MBV Motorsports	Pontiac
40	Sterling Marlin	Chip Ganassi Racing	Dodge
43	John Andretti	Petty Enterprises	Dodge
44	Buckshot Jones	Petty Enterprises	Dodge
45	Kyle Petty	Petty Enterprises	Dodge
55	Bobby Hamilton	Andy Petree Racing	Chevrolet
66	Todd Bodine	Haas-Carter Motorsports	Ford
77	Robert Pressley	Jasper Motorsports	Ford
84	Shawna Robinson	Michael Kranefuss Racing	Ford
88	Dale Jarrett	Robert Yates Racing	Ford
90	Hut Stricklin	Donlavey Racing	Ford
92	Stacy Compton	Melling Racing	Dodge
93	Dave Blaney	Bill Davis Racing	Dodge
96	Andy Houston (R)	PPI Motorsports	Ford
97	Kurt Busch (R)	Roush Racing	Ford
99	Jeff Burton	Roush Racing	Ford

== Practice ==
=== First practice ===
Pos	No.	Driver	Team	Manufacturer	Time	Speed
1	28	Ricky Rudd	Robert Yates Racing	Ford	39.551	182.043
2	24	Jeff Gordon	Hendrick Motorsports	Chevrolet	39.623	181.713
3	1	Steve Park	Dale Earnhardt, Inc.	Chevrolet	39.638	181.644
Official first practice results

=== Second practice ===
Pos	No.	Driver	Team	Manufacturer	Time	Speed
1	22	Ward Burton	Bill Davis Racing	Dodge	39.996	180.018
2	8	Dale Earnhardt Jr.	Dale Earnhardt, Inc.	Chevrolet	40.030	179.865
3	93	Dave Blaney	Bill Davis Racing	Dodge	40.035	179.843
Official second practice results

=== Final practice ===
Pos	No.	Driver	Team	Manufacturer	Time	Speed
1	22	Ward Burton	Bill Davis Racing	Dodge	40.937	175.880
2	66	Todd Bodine	Haas-Carter Motorsports	Ford	41.053	175.383
3	40	Sterling Marlin	Chip Ganassi Racing	Dodge	41.072	175.302
Official final practice results

== Qualifying ==
Pos	No.	Driver	Team	Manufacturer	Time
1	18	Bobby Labonte	Joe Gibbs Racing	Pontiac	39.423
2	66	Todd Bodine	Haas-Carter Motorsports	Ford	39.438
3	12	Jeremy Mayfield	Penske Racing South	Ford	39.580
4	20	Tony Stewart	Joe Gibbs Racing	Pontiac	39.585
5	88	Dale Jarrett	Robert Yates Racing	Ford	39.611
6	28	Ricky Rudd	Robert Yates Racing	Ford	39.613
7	1	Steve Park	Dale Earnhardt, Inc.	Chevrolet	39.633
8	10	Johnny Benson Jr.	MBV Motorsports	Pontiac	39.660
9	26	Jimmy Spencer	Haas-Carter Motorsports	Ford	39.727
10	6	Mark Martin	Roush Racing	Ford	39.739
11	43	John Andretti	Petty Enterprises	Dodge	39.761
12	11	Brett Bodine	Brett Bodine Racing	Ford	39.774
13	29	Kevin Harvick (R)	Richard Childress Racing	Chevrolet	39.779
14	45	Kyle Petty	Petty Enterprises	Dodge	39.806
15	93	Dave Blaney	Bill Davis Racing	Dodge	39.818
16	19	Casey Atwood (R)	Evernham Motorsports	Dodge	39.831
17	24	Jeff Gordon	Hendrick Motorsports	Chevrolet	39.836
18	22	Ward Burton	Bill Davis Racing	Dodge	39.846
19	2	Rusty Wallace	Penske Racing South	Ford	39.860
20	25	Jerry Nadeau	Hendrick Motorsports	Chevrolet	39.889
21	99	Jeff Burton	Roush Racing	Ford	39.944
22	9	Bill Elliott	Evernham Motorsports	Dodge	39.948
23	17	Matt Kenseth	Roush Racing	Ford	39.990
24	32	Ricky Craven	PPI Motorsports	Ford	40.032
25	01	Jason Leffler (R)	Chip Ganassi Racing	Dodge	40.053
26	27	Kenny Wallace	Eel River Racing	Pontiac	40.063
27	31	Mike Skinner	Richard Childress Racing	Chevrolet	40.067
28	30	Jeff Green	Richard Childress Racing	Chevrolet	40.072
29	15	Michael Waltrip	Dale Earnhardt, Inc.	Chevrolet	40.079
30	90	Hut Stricklin	Donlavey Racing	Ford	40.090
31	40	Sterling Marlin	Chip Ganassi Racing	Dodge	40.140
32	97	Kurt Busch (R)	Roush Racing	Ford	40.143
33	96	Andy Houston (R)	PPI Motorsports	Ford	40.147
34	33	Joe Nemechek	Andy Petree Racing	Chevrolet	40.199
35	14	Ron Hornaday Jr. (R)	A.J. Foyt Racing	Pontiac	40.258
36	7	Mike Wallace	Ultra Motorsports	Ford	40.314
Provisionals
37	55	Bobby Hamilton	Andy Petree Racing	Chevrolet	—
38	8	Dale Earnhardt Jr.	Dale Earnhardt, Inc.	Chevrolet	—
39	21	Elliott Sadler	Wood Brothers Racing	Ford	—
40	5	Terry Labonte	Hendrick Motorsports	Chevrolet	—
41	36	Ken Schrader	MBV Motorsports	Pontiac	—
42	77	Robert Pressley	Jasper Motorsports	Ford	—
43	92	Stacy Compton	Melling Racing	Dodge	—
Did not qualify
	4	Kevin Lepage	Morgan-McClure Motorsports	Chevrolet	40.342
	44	Buckshot Jones	Petty Enterprises	Dodge	40.714
	84	Shawna Robinson	Michael Kranefuss Racing	Ford	—

== Race results ==
Pos	Grid	No.	Driver	Team	Manufacturer	Laps	Points
1	19	2	Rusty Wallace	Penske Racing	Ford	250	185
2	17	24	Jeff Gordon	Hendrick Motorsports	Chevrolet	250	175
3	38	8	Dale Earnhardt Jr.	Dale Earnhardt, Inc.	Chevrolet	250	170
4	4	20	Tony Stewart	Joe Gibbs Racing	Pontiac	250	165
5	3	12	Jeremy Mayfield	Penske Racing	Ford	250	160
6	6	28	Ricky Rudd	Robert Yates Racing	Ford	250	155
7	9	26	Jimmy Spencer	Haas-Carter Motorsports	Ford	250	151
8	20	25	Jerry Nadeau	Hendrick Motorsports	Chevrolet	250	142
9	31	40	Sterling Marlin	Chip Ganassi Racing	Dodge	250	138
10	42	77	Robert Pressley	Jasper Motorsports	Ford	250	134
11	8	10	Johnny Benson Jr.	MBV Motorsports	Pontiac	250	135
12	30	90	Hut Stricklin	Donlavey Racing	Ford	250	127
13	32	97	Kurt Busch (R)	Roush Racing	Ford	250	124
14	22	9	Bill Elliott	Evernham Motorsports	Dodge	250	121
15	7	1	Steve Park	Dale Earnhardt, Inc.	Chevrolet	250	118
16	36	7	Mike Wallace	Ultra Motorsports	Ford	250	115
17	23	17	Matt Kenseth	Roush Racing	Ford	250	117
18	25	01	Jason Leffler (R)	Chip Ganassi Racing	Dodge	250	109
19	33	96	Andy Houston (R)	PPI Motorsports	Ford	250	106
20	34	33	Joe Nemechek	Andy Petree Racing	Chevrolet	250	108
21	28	30	Jeff Green	Richard Childress Racing	Chevrolet	250	100
22	1	18	Bobby Labonte	Joe Gibbs Racing	Pontiac	250	102
23	39	21	Elliott Sadler	Wood Brothers Racing	Ford	250	94
24	5	88	Dale Jarrett	Robert Yates Racing	Ford	250	96
25	13	29	Kevin Harvick (R)	Richard Childress Racing	Chevrolet	250	93
26	11	43	John Andretti	Petty Enterprises	Dodge	250	85
27	12	11	Brett Bodine	Brett Bodine Racing	Ford	249	82
28	2	66	Todd Bodine	Haas-Carter Motorsports	Ford	249	84
29	15	93	Dave Blaney	Bill Davis Racing	Dodge	249	76
30	40	5	Terry Labonte	Hendrick Motorsports	Chevrolet	249	73
31	21	99	Jeff Burton	Roush Racing	Ford	249	70
32	27	31	Mike Skinner	Richard Childress Racing	Chevrolet	249	67
33	41	36	Ken Schrader	MBV Motorsports	Pontiac	249	64
34	35	14	Ron Hornaday Jr. (R)	A.J. Foyt Racing	Pontiac	249	61
35	14	45	Kyle Petty	Petty Enterprises	Dodge	249	58
36	37	55	Bobby Hamilton	Andy Petree Racing	Chevrolet	247	55
37	26	27	Kenny Wallace	Eel River Racing	Pontiac	247	52
38	43	92	Stacy Compton	Melling Racing	Dodge	246	49
39	16	19	Casey Atwood (R)	Evernham Motorsports	Dodge	235	46
40	10	6	Mark Martin	Roush Racing	Ford	233	48
41	24	32	Ricky Craven	PPI Motorsports	Ford	232	40
42	18	22	Ward Burton	Bill Davis Racing	Dodge	223	37
43	29	15	Michael Waltrip	Dale Earnhardt, Inc.	Chevrolet	152	34

== Standings after the race ==
	Pos	Driver	Points
	1	Dale Jarrett	1,441
	2	Jeff Gordon	1,375 (–66)
	3	Johnny Benson Jr.	1,330 (–111)
2	4	Rusty Wallace	1,322 (–119)
	5	Sterling Marlin	1,291 (–150)
2	6	Ricky Rudd	1,251 (–190)
3	7	Bobby Hamilton	1,230 (–211)
1	8	Steve Park	1,227 (–214)
	9	Tony Stewart	1,212 (–229)
2	10	Dale Earnhardt Jr.	1,151 (–290)

Previous race: 2001 Talladega 500	NASCAR Winston Cup Series; 2001 season	Next race: 2001 Pontiac Excitement 400
