= 2001 Brickyard 400 =

NASCAR Winston Cup Series race

Race details
- Race 21 of 36 in the 2001 NASCAR Winston Cup Series
- 2001 Brickyard 400 program cover
- Date: August 5, 2001
- Official name: Brickyard 400
- Location: Indianapolis Motor Speedway in Speedway, Indiana
- Course: Permanent racing facility
- Course length: 2.5 miles (4.023 km)
- Distance: 160 laps, 400 mi (643.738 km)
- Average speed: 130.790 miles per hour (210.486 km/h)

Pole position
Driver	Jimmy Spencer	Haas-Carter Motorsports
- Time: 50.093

Most laps led
Driver	Steve Park	Dale Earnhardt, Inc.
- Laps: 39

Winner
No. 24	Jeff Gordon	Hendrick Motorsports

Television in the United States
- Network: NBC
- Announcers: Allen Bestwick, Wally Dallenbach Jr., Benny Parsons
- Nielsen ratings: 6.2/16

The 2001 Brickyard 400, the 8th running of the event, was a NASCAR Winston Cup Series race held on August 5, 2001, at Indianapolis Motor Speedway in Speedway, Indiana. Contested over 160 laps on the 2.5-mile (4.0-kilometre) speedway, it was the 21st race of the 2001 NASCAR Winston Cup Series season. Jeff Gordon of Hendrick Motorsports won the race.

== Background ==
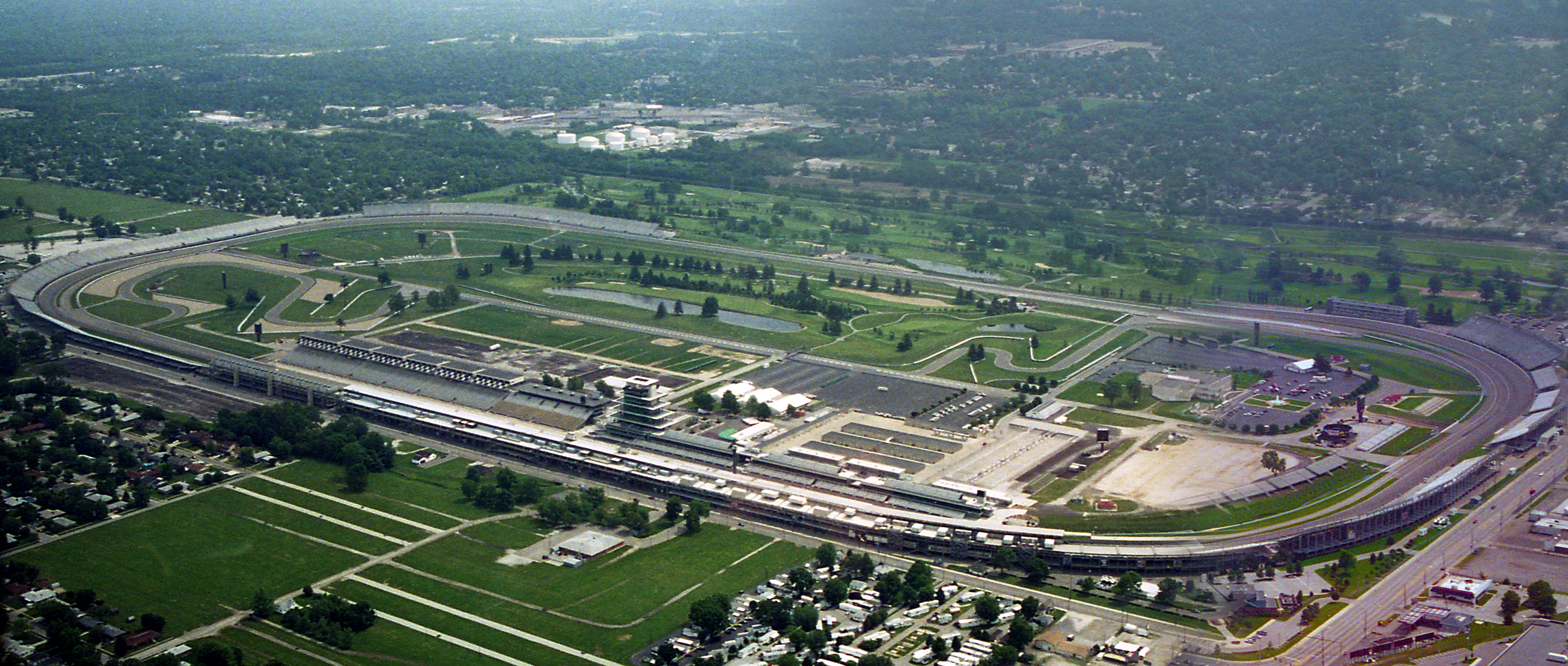
Indianapolis Motor Speedway, the track where the race was held.

The Indianapolis Motor Speedway, located in Speedway, Indiana, (an enclave suburb of Indianapolis) in the United States, is the home of the Indianapolis 500 and the Brickyard 400. It is located on the corner of 16th Street and Georgetown Road, approximately 6 miles (9.7 kilometres) west of Downtown Indianapolis. It is a four-turn rectangular-oval track that is 2.5 miles (4.0 kilometres) long. The track's turns are banked at 9 degrees, while the front stretch, the location of the finish line, has no banking. The back stretch, opposite of the front, also has a zero degree banking.

== Results ==
Pos	SP	No.	Driver	Car make	Entrant	Laps	Status
1	27	24	Jeff Gordon	Chevrolet	Hendrick Motorsports	160	Running
2	8	40	Sterling Marlin	Dodge	Chip Ganassi Racing	160	Running
3	26	10	Johnny Benson Jr.	Pontiac	MBV Motorsports	160	Running
4	37	2	Rusty Wallace	Ford	Team Penske	160	Running
5	34	97	Kurt Busch	Ford	Roush Racing	160	Running
6	19	22	Ward Burton	Dodge	Bill Davis Racing	160	Running
7	13	1	Steve Park	Chevrolet	Dale Earnhardt, Inc.	160	Running
8	2	9	Bill Elliott	Dodge	Evernham Motorsports	160	Running
9	7	32	Ricky Craven	Ford	PPI Motorsports	160	Running
10	36	8	Dale Earnhardt Jr.	Chevrolet	Dale Earnhardt, Inc.	160	Running
11	11	29	Kevin Harvick	Chevrolet	Richard Childress Racing	160	Running
12	6	88	Dale Jarrett	Ford	Robert Yates Racing	160	Running
13	1	26	Jimmy Spencer	Ford	Haas-Carter Motorsports	160	Running
14	30	43	John Andretti	Dodge	Petty Enterprises	160	Running
15	15	18	Bobby Labonte	Pontiac	Joe Gibbs Racing	160	Running
16	22	99	Jeff Burton	Ford	Roush Racing	160	Running
17	9	20	Tony Stewart	Pontiac	Joe Gibbs Racing	160	Running
18	16	12	Jeremy Mayfield	Ford	Team Penske	160	Running
19	35	5	Terry Labonte	Chevrolet	Hendrick Motorsports	160	Running
20	20	33	Joe Nemechek	Chevrolet	Andy Petree Racing	160	Running
21	31	30	Jeff Green	Chevrolet	Richard Childress Racing	160	Running
22	25	6	Mark Martin	Ford	Roush Racing	160	Running
23	38	21	Elliott Sadler	Ford	Wood Brothers Racing	160	Running
24	10	66	Todd Bodine	Ford	Haas-Carter Motorsports	159	Running
25	14	15	Michael Waltrip	Chevrolet	Dale Earnhardt, Inc.	159	Running
26	29	01	Jason Leffler	Dodge	Chip Ganassi Racing	159	Running
27	39	55	Bobby Hamilton	Chevrolet	Andy Petree Racing	159	Running
28	40	36	Ken Schrader	Pontiac	MBV Motorsports	159	Running
29	32	90	Hut Stricklin	Ford	Donlavey Racing	159	Running
30	42	31	Robby Gordon	Chevrolet	Richard Childress Racing	159	Running
31	5	02	Ryan Newman	Ford	Team Penske	159	Running
32	17	50	Rich Bickle	Chevrolet	Midwest Transit Racing	159	Running
33	33	92	Stacy Compton	Dodge	Melling Racing	159	Running
34	28	14	Ron Hornaday Jr.	Pontiac	A. J. Foyt Racing	158	Running
35	21	77	Robert Pressley	Ford	Jasper Motorsports	158	Running
36	43	44	Buckshot Jones	Dodge	Petty Enterprises	158	Running
37	18	11	Brett Bodine	Ford	Brett Bodine Racing	158	Running
38	41	25	Jerry Nadeau	Chevrolet	Hendrick Motorsports	135	Crash
39	4	28	Ricky Rudd	Ford	Robert Yates Racing	107	Running
40	24	93	Dave Blaney	Dodge	Bill Davis Racing	100	Crash
41	3	19	Casey Atwood	Dodge	Evernham Motorsports	38	Overheating
42	23	17	Matt Kenseth	Ford	Roush Racing	2	Crash
43	12	96	Andy Houston	Ford	PPI Motorsports	1	Crash

=== Failed to qualify ===
- Kevin Lepage (#4)
- Derrike Cope (#37)
- Mike Wallace (#7)
- Hermie Sadler (#13)
- Ed Berrier (#95)
- David Keith (#57)
- Rick Mast (#27)
- Dave Marcis (#71)
- Kyle Petty (#45)
- Shawna Robinson (#84)
- Andy Hillenburg (#49)

=== Race statistics ===
- Time of race: 3:03:30
- Average speed: 130.790 miles per hour (210.486 km/h)
- Pole speed: 179.666 miles per hour (289.144 km/h)
- Cautions: 7 for 28 laps
- Margin of victory: 0.943 seconds
- Lead changes: 18
- Percent of race run under caution: 17.5%
- Average green flag run: 16.5 laps

Lap leaders
Laps	Leader
1–16	Jimmy Spencer
17–22	Bill Elliott
23–25	Ryan Newman
26–43	Kevin Harvick
44–62	Sterling Marlin
63	Steve Park
64	Kurt Busch
65–70	Dale Earnhardt Jr.
71–72	Bobby Labonte
73–76	Jeff Burton
77–79	Tony Stewart
80–104	Steve Park
105–108	Dale Earnhardt Jr.
109–112	Jeff Gordon
113–116	Bobby Labonte
117–118	Sterling Marlin
119–131	Steve Park
132–135	Sterling Marlin
136–160	Jeff Gordon

Total laps led
39	Steve Park
29	Jeff Gordon
25	Sterling Marlin
18	Kevin Harvick
16	Jimmy Spencer
10	Dale Earnhardt Jr.
6	Bill Elliott
6	Bobby Labonte
4	Jeff Burton
3	Tony Stewart
3	Ryan Newman
1	Kurt Busch

Cautions: 7 for 28 laps
Laps	Reason
3–7	#77 (Robert Pressley), #96 (Andy Houston), #17 (Matt Kenseth), #6 (Mark Martin), #8 (Dale Earnhardt Jr.), and #36 (Ken Schrader) crash turn 2
22–25	Debris
33–35	#02 (Ryan Newman) crash turn 4
37–40	Oil frontstraight
76–79	Debris
132–135	Debris
139–142	#25 (Jerry Nadeau) crash turn 3

Previous race: 2001 Pennsylvania 500	NASCAR Winston Cup Series; 2001 season	Next race: 2001 Global Crossing at the Glen
