= 2001 Food City 500 =

Race details
- Race 6 of 36 in the 2001 NASCAR Winston Cup Series
- Map of the Bristol Motor Speedway
- Date: March 25, 2001
- Location: Bristol Motor Speedway, Bristol, Tennessee
- Course: Permanent racing facility
- Course length: 0.533 miles (0.858 km)
- Distance: 500 laps, 266.5 mi (428.8 km)
- Weather: Temperatures up to 48.2 °F (9.0 °C); wind speeds up to 23.02 miles per hour (37.05 km/h)
- Average speed: 86.949 mph (139.931 km/h)

Pole position
Driver	Mark Martin	Roush Racing
- Time: 15.192

Most laps led
Driver	Kevin Harvick	Richard Childress Racing
- Laps: 137

Winner
No. 21	Elliott Sadler	Wood Brothers Racing

Television in the United States
- Network: Fox
- Announcers: Mike Joy, Darrell Waltrip, Larry McReynolds
- Nielsen ratings: 6.1 (Final); 5.3/12 (Overnight)

The 2001 Food City 500 was the sixth stock car race of the 2001 NASCAR Winston Cup Series season. It was held on March 25, 2001 at the Bristol Motor Speedway in Bristol, Tennessee. The 500-lap race was won by Elliott Sadler for the Wood Brothers Racing team; it was Sadler's first win in the Winston Cup Series and Wood Brothers Racing first since 1993, and the last until the 2011 Daytona 500 10 years later. John Andretti finished second and Jeremy Mayfield came in third.

== Report ==
=== Background ===
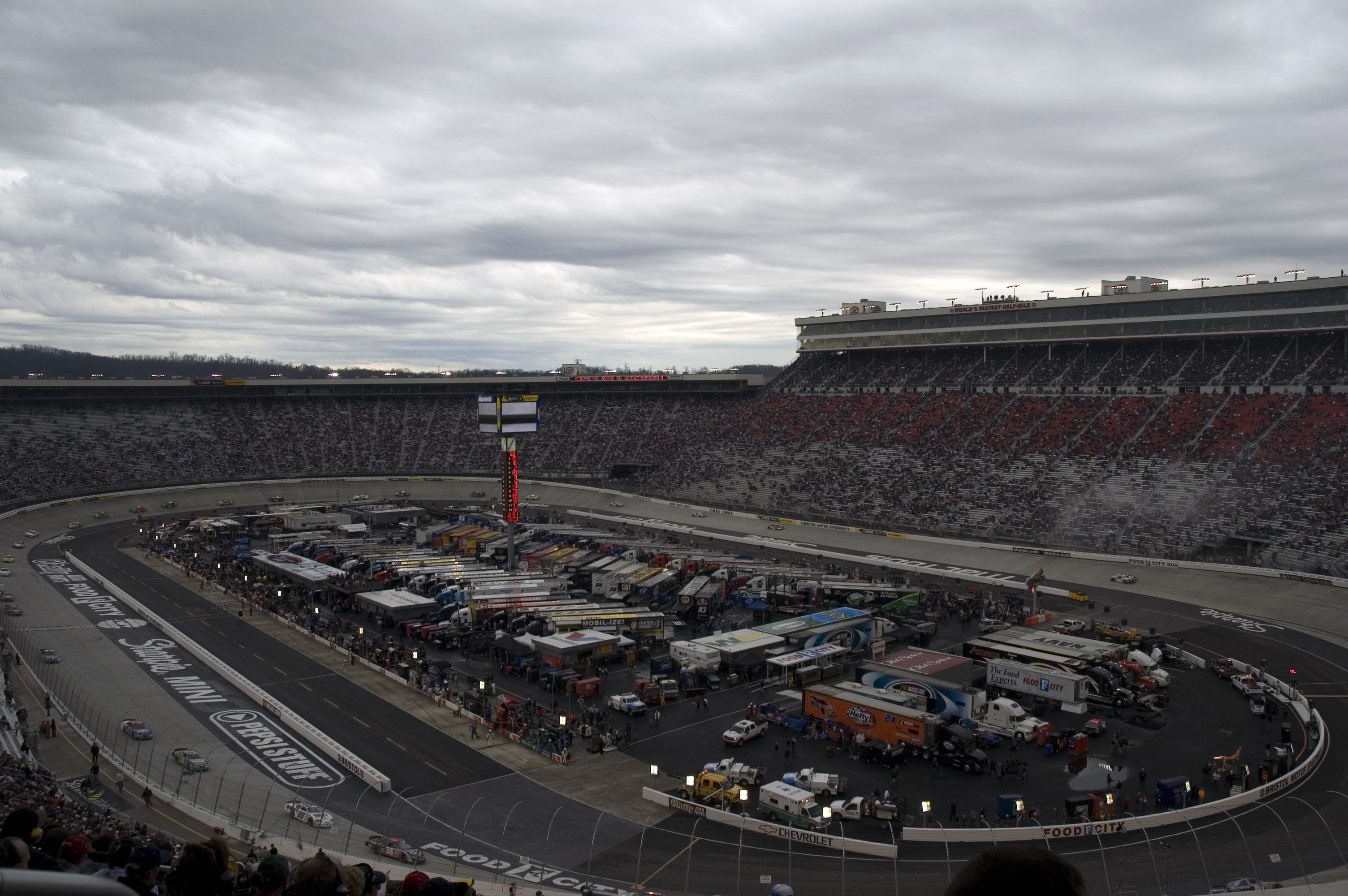
Bristol Motor Speedway, where the race was held.

The track, Bristol Motor Speedway, is one of five short tracks to hold NASCAR races. Its standard track at Bristol Motor Speedway is a four-turn short track oval that is 0.533 miles (0.858 km) long. The track's turns are banked from twenty-four to thirty degrees, while both the front stretch (the location of the finish line) and the back stretch are banked from six to ten degrees.

Before the race Dale Jarrett led the Drivers' Championship with 756 points, with Sterling Marlin and Johnny Benson Jr. tied for second place with 691 points each. Jeff Gordon and Steve Park rounded out the top five, and Ricky Rudd, Rusty Wallace, Michael Waltrip, Bill Elliott and Ken Schrader rounded out the top ten. In the Manufacturers' Championship, Chevrolet led with 42 points; Ford was second with 31 points. Pontiac was third with 19 points, with Dodge a close fourth with 17 points. Wallace was the race's defending champion.

=== Entry list ===
- (R) denotes rookie driver.

No.	Driver	Team
01	Jason Leffler (R)	Chip Ganassi Racing
1	Steve Park	Dale Earnhardt, Inc.
2	Rusty Wallace	Penske Racing South
4	Kevin Lepage	Morgan-McClure Motorsports
5	Terry Labonte	Hendrick Motorsports
6	Mark Martin	Roush Racing
7	Mike Wallace	Ultra Motorsports
8	Dale Earnhardt Jr.	Dale Earnhardt, Inc.
9	Bill Elliott	Evernham Motorsports
10	Johnny Benson Jr.	MBV Motorsports
11	Brett Bodine	Brett Bodine Racing
12	Jeremy Mayfield	Penske Racing South
14	Ron Hornaday Jr. (R)	A. J. Foyt Racing
15	Michael Waltrip	Dale Earnhardt, Inc.
17	Matt Kenseth	Roush Racing
18	Bobby Labonte	Joe Gibbs Racing
19	Casey Atwood (R)	Evernham Motorsports
20	Tony Stewart	Joe Gibbs Racing
21	Elliott Sadler	Wood Brothers Racing
22	Ward Burton	Bill Davis Racing
24	Jeff Gordon	Hendrick Motorsports
25	Jerry Nadeau	Hendrick Motorsports
26	Jimmy Spencer	Haas-Carter Motorsports
27	Kenny Wallace	Eel River Racing
28	Ricky Rudd	Robert Yates Racing
29	Kevin Harvick (R)	Richard Childress Racing
31	Mike Skinner	Richard Childress Racing
32	Ricky Craven	PPI Motorsports
33	Joe Nemechek	Andy Petree Racing
36	Ken Schrader	MBV Motorsports
40	Sterling Marlin	Chip Ganassi Racing
43	John Andretti	Petty Enterprises
44	Buckshot Jones	Petty Enterprises
45	Kyle Petty	Petty Enterprises
50	Rick Mast	Midwest Transit Racing
55	Bobby Hamilton	Andy Petree Racing
66	Todd Bodine	Haas-Carter Motorsports
77	Robert Pressley	Jasper Motorsports
85	Carl Long	Mansion Motorsports
88	Dale Jarrett	Robert Yates Racing
90	Hut Stricklin	Donlavey Racing
92	Stacy Compton	Melling Racing
93	Dave Blaney	Bill Davis Racing
96	Andy Houston (R)	PPI Motorsports
97	Kurt Busch (R)	Roush Racing
99	Jeff Burton	Roush Racing

== Practice ==
=== First practice ===
Pos	No.	Driver	Team	Manufacturer	Time	Speed
1	6	Mark Martin	Roush Racing	Ford	15.213	126.129
2	24	Jeff Gordon	Hendrick Motorsports	Chevrolet	15.245	125.884
3	29	Kevin Harvick (R)	Richard Childress Racing	Chevrolet	15.300	125.412
Official First practice results

=== Final practice ===
Pos	No.	Driver	Team	Manufacturer	Time	Speed
1	2	Rusty Wallace	Penske Racing South	Ford	15.864	120.953
2	6	Mark Martin	Roush Racing	Ford	15.920	120.528
3	19	Casey Atwood (R)	Evernham Motorsports	Dodge	15.936	120.407
Official Final practice results

== Qualifying ==
Pos	No.	Driver	Team	Manufacturer	Time
1	6	Mark Martin	Roush Racing	Ford	15.192
2	40	Sterling Marlin	Chip Ganassi Racing	Dodge	15.303
3	29	Kevin Harvick (R)	Richard Childress Racing	Chevrolet	15.307
4	2	Rusty Wallace	Penske Racing South	Ford	15.330
5	66	Todd Bodine	Haas-Carter Motorsports	Ford	15.357
6	55	Bobby Hamilton	Andy Petree Racing	Chevrolet	15.379
7	45	Kyle Petty	Petty Enterprises	Dodge	15.382
8	93	Dave Blaney	Bill Davis Racing	Dodge	15.387
9	8	Dale Earnhardt Jr.	Dale Earnhardt, Inc.	Chevrolet	15.388
10	36	Ken Schrader	MBV Motorsports	Pontiac	15.400
11	43	John Andretti	Petty Enterprises	Dodge	15.400
12	9	Bill Elliott	Evernham Motorsports	Dodge	15.401
13	18	Bobby Labonte	Joe Gibbs Racing	Pontiac	15.402
14	28	Ricky Rudd	Robert Yates Racing	Ford	15.410
15	24	Jeff Gordon	Hendrick Motorsports	Chevrolet	15.419
16	19	Casey Atwood (R)	Evernham Motorsports	Dodge	15.423
17	1	Steve Park	Dale Earnhardt, Inc.	Chevrolet	15.424
18	22	Ward Burton	Bill Davis Racing	Dodge	15.451
19	88	Dale Jarrett	Robert Yates Racing	Ford	15.456
20	33	Joe Nemechek	Andy Petree Racing	Chevrolet	15.469
21	44	Buckshot Jones	Petty Enterprises	Dodge	15.469
22	25	Jerry Nadeau	Hendrick Motorsports	Chevrolet	15.476
23	26	Jimmy Spencer	Haas-Carter Motorsports	Ford	15.483
24	17	Matt Kenseth	Roush Racing	Ford	15.484
25	5	Terry Labonte	Hendrick Motorsports	Chevrolet	15.485
26	77	Robert Pressley	Jasper Motorsports	Ford	15.507
27	50	Rick Mast	Midwest Transit Racing	Chevrolet	15.511
28	10	Johnny Benson Jr.	MBV Motorsports	Pontiac	15.512
29	15	Michael Waltrip	Dale Earnhardt, Inc.	Chevrolet	15.524
30	12	Jeremy Mayfield	Penske Racing South	Ford	15.533
31	27	Kenny Wallace	Eel River Racing	Pontiac	15.533
32	99	Jeff Burton	Roush Racing	Ford	15.539
33	31	Mike Skinner	Richard Childress Racing	Chevrolet	15.545
34	32	Ricky Craven	PPI Motorsports	Ford	15.546
35	11	Brett Bodine	Brett Bodine Racing	Ford	15.566
36	96	Andy Houston (R)	PPI Motorsports	Ford	15.575
Provisionals
37	20	Tony Stewart	Joe Gibbs Racing	Pontiac	—
38	21	Elliott Sadler	Wood Brothers Racing	Ford	—
39	97	Kurt Busch (R)	Roush Racing	Ford	—
40	14	Ron Hornaday Jr. (R)	A. J. Foyt Racing	Pontiac	—
41	92	Stacy Compton	Melling Racing	Dodge	—
42	4	Kevin Lepage	Morgan-McClure Motorsports	Chevrolet	—
43	7	Mike Wallace	Ultra Motorsports	Ford	—
Did not qualify
	90	Hut Stricklin	Donlavey Racing	Ford	15.596
	01	Jason Leffler (R)	Chip Ganassi Racing	Dodge	15.650
	85	Carl Long	Mansion Motorsports	Ford	16.253

== Race results ==
Pos	Grid	No	Driver	Team	Manufacturer	Laps	Points
1	38	21	Elliott Sadler	Wood Brothers Racing	Ford	500	180
2	11	43	John Andretti	Petty Enterprises	Dodge	500	175
3	30	12	Jeremy Mayfield	Penske Racing South	Ford	500	165
4	15	24	Jeff Gordon	Hendrick Motorsports	Chevrolet	500	165
5	18	22	Ward Burton	Bill Davis Racing	Dodge	500	155
6	25	5	Terry Labonte	Hendrick Motorsports	Chevrolet	500	150
7	4	2	Rusty Wallace	Penske Racing South	Ford	500	146
8	6	55	Bobby Hamilton	Andy Petree Racing	Chevrolet	500	142
9	17	1	Steve Park	Dale Earnhardt, Inc.	Chevrolet	500	143
10	14	28	Ricky Rudd	Robert Yates Racing	Ford	500	134
11	41	92	Stacy Compton	Melling Racing	Dodge	500	130
12	2	40	Sterling Marlin	Chip Ganassi Racing	Dodge	500	132
13	13	18	Bobby Labonte	Joe Gibbs Racing	Pontiac	500	124
14	24	17	Matt Kenseth	Roush Racing	Ford	500	126
15	42	4	Kevin Lepage	Morgan-McClure Motorsports	Chevrolet	500	118
16	19	88	Dale Jarrett	Robert Yates Racing	Ford	500	115
17	12	9	Bill Elliott	Evernham Motorsports	Dodge	500	112
18	33	31	Mike Skinner	Richard Childress Racing	Chevrolet	500	109
19	23	26	Jimmy Spencer	Haas-Carter Motorsports	Ford	500	106
20	16	19	Casey Atwood (R)	Evernham Motorsports	Dodge	500	103
21	40	14	Ron Hornaday Jr. (R)	A. J. Foyt Racing	Pontiac	500	100
22	29	15	Michael Waltrip	Dale Earnhardt, Inc.	Chevrolet	500	97
23	34	32	Ricky Craven	PPI Motorsports	Ford	500	94
24	3	29	Kevin Harvick (R)	Richard Childress Racing	Chevrolet	500	101
25	37	20	Tony Stewart	Joe Gibbs Racing	Pontiac	500	88
26	28	10	Johnny Benson Jr.	MBV Motorsports	Pontiac	499	85
27	35	11	Brett Bodine	Brett Bodine Racing	Ford	493	82
28	26	77	Robert Pressley	Jasper Motorsports	Ford	487	79
29	8	93	Dave Blaney	Bill Davis Racing	Dodge	472	76
30	22	25	Jerry Nadeau	Hendrick Motorsports	Chevrolet	459	73
31	9	8	Dale Earnhardt Jr.	Dale Earnhardt, Inc.	Chevrolet	456	70
32	5	66	Todd Bodine	Haas-Carter Motorsports	Ford	437	67
33	21	44	Buckshot Jones	Petty Enterprises	Dodge	420	64
34	1	6	Mark Martin	Roush Racing	Ford	412	66
35	10	36	Ken Schrader	MBV Motorsports	Pontiac	350	58
36	27	50	Rick Mast	Midwest Transit Racing	Chevrolet	349	55
37	43	7	Mike Wallace	Ultra Motorsports	Ford	345	57
38	31	27	Kenny Wallace	Eel River Racing	Pontiac	307	54
39	36	96	Andy Houston (R)	PPI Motorsports	Ford	265	46
40	32	99	Jeff Burton	Roush Racing	Ford	245	43
41	7	45	Kyle Petty	Petty Enterprises	Dodge	228	40
42	39	97	Kurt Busch (R)	Roush Racing	Ford	118	37
43	20	33	Joe Nemechek	Andy Petree Racing	Chevrolet	108	34
Official race results

== Standings after the race ==
	Pos	Driver	Points
	1	Dale Jarrett	871
2	2	Jeff Gordon	826 (–45)
1	3	Sterling Marlin	823 (–48)
1	4	Johnny Benson Jr.	776 (–95)
	5	Steve Park	758 (–113)
1	6	Rusty Wallace	752 (–119)
1	7	Ricky Rudd	743 (–128)
4	8	Bobby Hamilton	716 (–155)
9	9	Elliott Sadler	709 (–162)
1	10	Bill Elliott	701 (–170)

Previous race: 2001 Carolina Dodge Dealers 400	Winston Cup Series; 2001 season	Next race: 2001 Harrah's 500
