= 2001 Cracker Barrel Old Country Store 500 =

Race details
- Race 4 of 36 of in the 2001 NASCAR Winston Cup Series
- 2001 Cracker Barrel Old Country Store 500 program cover
- Date: March 11, 2001
- Location: Atlanta Motor Speedway, Hampton, Georgia
- Course: Permanent racing facility
- Course length: 1.54 miles (2.48 km)
- Distance: 325 laps, 500.5 mi (805.4 km)
- Weather: Temperatures reaching up to 68 °F (20 °C); wind speeds up to 6 miles per hour (9.7 km/h)
- Average speed: 143.273 mph (230.576 km/h)

Pole position
Driver	Dale Jarrett	Yates Racing
- Time: 28.763

Most laps led
Driver	Jeff Gordon	Hendrick Motorsports
- Laps: 118

Winner
No. 29	Kevin Harvick	Richard Childress Racing

Television in the United States
- Network: Fox
- Announcers: Mike Joy, Larry McReynolds, Darrell Waltrip
- Nielsen ratings: 5.7

The 2001 Cracker Barrel Old Country Store 500 was the fourth stock car race of the 2001 NASCAR Winston Cup Series. It was held on March 11, 2001 at Atlanta Motor Speedway, in Hampton, Georgia. The 325-lap race was won by Kevin Harvick of the Richard Childress Racing team after starting from fifth position. Jeff Gordon finished second and his Hendrick Motorsports teammate Jerry Nadeau came in third.

Pole position driver Dale Jarrett maintained his lead for the first six laps of the race, but Harvick, who started fifth, passed him on the seventh lap. Gordon soon became the leader and would lead the race high of 118 laps. Five laps from the finish, Harvick took the lead after a five-car battle. On the final lap, Harvick won his first Winston Cup Series race from Gordon by .006 seconds in his third start.

There were 8 cautions and 25 lead changes among 11 different drivers. The result left Gordon in first position of the Drivers' Championship, thirty-seven ahead of second place driver Sterling Marlin and seventy-three ahead of Johnny Benson Jr. Chevrolet maintained its lead in the Manufacturers' Championship, fourteen points ahead of Ford and twenty ahead of Pontiac, with thirty-two races remaining in the season.

== Report ==
=== Background ===
The track, Atlanta Motor Speedway is one of three quad-oval tracks to hold NASCAR races, the others being Charlotte Motor Speedway and Texas Motor Speedway. The standard track at Atlanta Motor Speedway is a four-turn quad-oval that is 1.54 miles (2.48 km) long. The track's turns are banked at twenty-four degrees, while the straightaways are banked at five degrees. Atlanta Motor Speedway can seat up to 99,000 people.

Before the race, Sterling Marlin was leading the Drivers' Championship with 468 points, and Jeff Gordon stood in second with 433 points. Michael Waltrip was third in the Drivers' Championship with 415 points, Dale Jarrett was fourth with 411 points, and Steve Park was fifth with 401 points. In the Manufacturers' Championship, Chevrolet were leading with 27 points, nine points ahead of their rival Ford. Pontiac, with 12 points, were two points ahead of Dodge in the battle for third. Dale Earnhardt was the race's defending champion.

=== Practice and qualifying ===
Two practice sessions were held before the Sunday race—one on Friday, and one on Saturday. The first session lasted 120 minutes, and the second 60 minutes. During the first practice session, Jarrett was fastest, placing ahead of Jimmy Spencer in second and Gordon in third. Kevin Harvick was scored fourth, and Brett Bodine placed fifth.

During Friday afternoon qualifying, forty-six cars were entered, but only forty-three were able to race because of NASCAR's qualifying procedure. Dale Jarrett clinched his second consecutive pole position of 2001 with a time of 28.763 seconds. He was joined on the front row by Jeff Gordon, Todd Bodine and Mark Martin shared the second row in the third and fourth position, while Kevin Harvick, with a time of 28.908, qualified fifth. Jeremy Mayfield, Dave Blaney, Jimmy Spencer, Rusty Wallace and Michael Waltrip rounded out the top ten qualifiers. The three drivers that failed to qualify were Rick Mast, Carl Long and Casey Atwood.

=== Race ===
The race, the fourth out of a total of thirty-six in the season, began at 1 p.m. EST and was televised live in the United States on Fox. To begin pre-race ceremonies, at 1 p.m EST, Phil Brannon, the Atlanta Motor Speedway Chaplain, gave the invocation. Then, Moby in the Morning, from local radio station WKHX-FM performed the national anthem, and television personality Willard Scott gave the command for drivers to start their engines.

Dale Jarrett made a good start, retaining the first position; Jeff Gordon behind him maintained second position. At the end of the first lap, Kevin Harvick passed Gordon. By lap 3, Jerry Nadeau was clipped by Michael Waltrip with Robert Pressley spinning out and nearly being clipped by Nadeau. During the same lap, the grandstands fell silent and spectators held up a three-finger salute in the memory of Dale Earnhardt—who was killed in an accident during the Daytona 500 three weeks previously; and 7,000 balloons were released into the air.

The heartbreak of the day was for Dave Blaney. Blaney, driving Bill Davis Racing's #93 Dodge, dominated the middle of the race, leading 70 laps. Blaney was about to make a pit stop with less than 90 laps to go, when a caution came out. Blaney chose to not pit and lead to the caution flag to protect his lead. Two laps later, the wheel came flying off, costing him his first Winston Cup win. Once Blaney was out of the race, this would set up the final shootout between 5 cars with those being Jerry Nadeau, Dale Jarrett, Kevin Harvick, Dale Earnhardt Jr., and Jeff Gordon. With 5 to go, Harvick passed Nadeau and Jarrett to take the lead. With 3 to go, Dale Earnhardt Jr. came down pit road with a flat tire ending his chances of winning. At the same time, Jeff Gordon passed his teammate Jerry Nadeau for second setting up a dramatic final lap between Harvick and Gordon.

On the final lap (325), Gordon attempted a pass on Harvick on the straightway but Harvick won his first Winston Cup Series race by .006 seconds, tied for the seventh closest finish in NASCAR History with the 2024 YellaWood 500. Nadeau followed in third, ahead of Jarrett in fourth and Terry Labonte in fifth.

=== Post-race ===
Kevin Harvick appeared in victory lane after his victory lap to start celebrating his first win in the Winston Cup Series. Harvick's victory took place in his third start, breaking the record of the fewest starts to first victory previously held by Dale Earnhardt Jr.

== Results ==
=== Qualifying ===
Grid	Car	Driver	Team	Manufacturer	Time (in seconds)
1	88	Dale Jarrett	Robert Yates Racing	Ford	28.763
2	24	Jeff Gordon	Hendrick Motorsports	Chevrolet	28.813
3	66	Todd Bodine	Haas-Carter Motorsports	Ford	28.827
4	6	Mark Martin	Roush Racing	Ford	28.892
5	29	Kevin Harvick	Richard Childress Racing	Chevrolet	28.908
6	12	Jeremy Mayfield	Penske Racing	Ford	28.950
7	93	Dave Blaney	Bill Davis Racing	Dodge	28.976
8	26	Jimmy Spencer	Haas-Carter Motorsports	Ford	28.993
9	2	Rusty Wallace	Penske Racing	Ford	28.996
10	15	Michael Waltrip	Dale Earnhardt, Inc.	Chevrolet	28.998
11	33	Joe Nemechek	Andy Petree Racing	Chevrolet	29.034
12	40	Sterling Marlin	Chip Ganassi Racing	Dodge	29.036
13	25	Jerry Nadeau	Hendrick Motorsports	Chevrolet	29.053
14	22	Ward Burton	Bill Davis Racing	Dodge	29.063
15	14	Ron Hornaday Jr.	A.J. Foyt Racing	Pontiac	29.065
16	44	Buckshot Jones	Petty Enterprises	Dodge	29.067
17	8	Dale Earnhardt Jr.	Dale Earnhardt, Inc.	Chevrolet	29.078
18	45	Kyle Petty	Petty Enterprises	Dodge	29.094
19	10	Johnny Benson Jr.	Ginn Racing	Pontiac	29.138
20	43	John Andretti	Petty Enterprises	Dodge	29.142
21	5	Terry Labonte	Hendrick Motorsports	Chevrolet	29.147
22	01	Jason Leffler	Chip Ganassi Racing	Dodge	29.156
23	28	Ricky Rudd	Robert Yates Racing	Ford	29.165
24	9	Bill Elliott	Evernham Motorsports	Dodge	29.176
25	90	Hut Stricklin	Donlavey Racing	Ford	29.179
26	11	Brett Bodine	Brett Bodine Racing	Ford	29.196
27	36	Ken Schrader	MB2 Motorsports	Pontiac	29.203
28	92	Stacy Compton	Melling Racing	Dodge	29.213
29	96	Andy Houston	PPI Motorsports	Ford	29.222
30	31	Mike Skinner	Richard Childress Racing	Chevrolet	29.235
31	55	Bobby Hamilton	Andy Petree Racing	Chevrolet	29.243
32	1	Steve Park	Dale Earnhardt, Inc.	Chevrolet	29.244
33	77	Robert Pressley	Jasper Motorsports	Ford	29.315
34	18	Bobby Labonte	Joe Gibbs Racing	Pontiac	29.325
35	20	Tony Stewart	Joe Gibbs Racing	Pontiac	29.330
36	97	Kurt Busch	Roush Racing	Ford	29.394
37	99	Jeff Burton	Roush Racing	Ford	Provisional
38	17	Matt Kenseth	Roush Racing	Ford	Provisional
39	7	Mike Wallace	Ultra Motorsports	Ford	Provisional
40	21	Elliott Sadler	Wood Brothers Racing	Ford	Provisional
41	4	Robby Gordon	Morgan-McClure Motorsports	Chevrolet	Provisional
42	27	Kenny Wallace	Eel River Racing	Pontiac	Provisional
43	32	Ricky Craven	PPI Motorsports	Ford	Provisional
Failed to Qualify
44	50	Rick Mast	Midwest Transit Racing	Chevrolet	29.429
45	85	Carl Long	Mansion Motorsports	Ford	29.565
46	19	Casey Atwood	Evernham Motorsports	Dodge	29.696

=== Race ===
Pos	Car	Driver	Team	Manufacturer	Laps	Points
1	29	Kevin Harvick (R)	Richard Childress Racing	Chevrolet	325	180
2	24	Jeff Gordon	Hendrick Motorsports	Chevrolet	325	180
3	25	Jerry Nadeau	Hendrick Motorsports	Chevrolet	325	170
4	88	Dale Jarrett	Robert Yates Racing	Ford	325	165
5	5	Terry Labonte	Hendrick Motorsports	Chevrolet	325	155
6	28	Ricky Rudd	Robert Yates Racing	Ford	325	150
7	10	Johnny Benson Jr.	MBV Motorsports	Pontiac	325	146
8	36	Ken Schrader	MB2 Motorsports	Pontiac	325	147
9	31	Mike Skinner	Richard Childress Racing	Chevrolet	325	138
10	97	Kurt Busch (R)	Roush Racing	Ford	324	134
11	22	Ward Burton	Bill Davis Racing	Dodge	324	130
12	2	Rusty Wallace	Penske Racing	Ford	324	127
13	32	Ricky Craven	PPI Motorsports	Ford	324	124
14	43	John Andretti	Petty Enterprises	Dodge	324	121
15	8	Dale Earnhardt Jr.	Dale Earnhardt, Inc.	Chevrolet	324	118
16	9	Bill Elliott	Evernham Motorsports	Dodge	324	115
17	33	Joe Nemechek	Andy Petree Racing	Chevrolet	323	112
18	66	Todd Bodine	Haas-Carter Motorsports	Ford	323	109
19	44	Buckshot Jones	Petty Enterprises	Dodge	323	106
20	4	Robby Gordon	Morgan-McClure Motorsports	Chevrolet	323	103
21	96	Andy Houston (R)	PPI Motorsports	Ford	323	100
22	55	Bobby Hamilton	Andy Petree Racing	Chevrolet	322	97
23	15	Michael Waltrip	Dale Earnhardt, Inc.	Chevrolet	322	94
24	92	Stacy Compton	Melling Racing	Dodge	322	91
25	26	Jimmy Spencer	Haas-Carter Motorsports	Ford	322	93
26	11	Brett Bodine	Brett Bodine Racing	Ford	321	85
27	20	Tony Stewart	Joe Gibbs Racing	Pontiac	320	82
28	90	Hut Stricklin	Donlavey Racing	Ford	320	79
29	27	Kenny Wallace	Eel River Racing	Pontiac	318	76
30	99	Jeff Burton	Roush Racing	Ford	317	73
31	21	Elliott Sadler	Wood Brothers Racing	Ford	316	70
32	01	Jason Leffler (R)	Chip Ganassi Racing with Felix Sabates	Dodge	314	72
33	18	Bobby Labonte	Joe Gibbs Racing	Pontiac	312	64
34	93	Dave Blaney	Bill Davis Racing	Dodge	304	66
35	40	Sterling Marlin	Chip Ganassi Racing with Felix Sabates	Dodge	299	63
36	77	Robert Pressley	Jasper Motorsports	Ford	280	60
37	17	Matt Kenseth	Roush Racing	Ford	273	52
38	12	Jeremy Mayfield	Penske Racing	Ford	261	49
39	14	Ron Hornaday Jr. (R)	A. J. Foyt Racing	Pontiac	258	46
40	7	Mike Wallace	Ultra Motorsports	Ford	251	43
41	6	Mark Martin	Roush Racing	Ford	231	45
42	45	Kyle Petty	Petty Enterprises	Dodge	225	37
43	1	Steve Park	Dale Earnhardt Inc.	Chevrolet	81	34

== Standings after the race ==
	Pos	Driver	Points
1	1	Jeff Gordon	613
2	2	Dale Jarrett	576 (–37)
3	3	Johnny Benson Jr.	540 (–73)
3	4	Sterling Marlin	531 (–82)
2	5	Michael Waltrip	509 (–104)
1	6	Bill Elliott	495 (–118)
10	7	Jerry Nadeau	478 (–135)
3	8	Rusty Wallace	472 (–141)
5	9	Ricky Rudd	467 (–146)
6	10	Ken Schrader	461 (–152)

Previous race: 2001 UAW-DaimlerChrysler 400	Winston Cup Series; 2001 season	Next race: 2001 Carolina Dodge Dealers 400
