= 2001 Pennzoil Freedom 400 =

Race details
- Race 34 of 36 in the 2001 NASCAR Winston Cup Series season
- Layout of Homestead-Miami Speedway
- Date: November 11, 2001
- Location: Homestead Miami Speedway, Homestead, Florida
- Course: Permanent racing facility
- Course length: 1.5 miles (2.4 km)
- Distance: 267 laps, 400.5 mi (644.52 km)
- Weather: Temperatures averaging around 69.4 °F (20.8 °C); wind speeds up to 12.7 miles per hour (20.4 km/h)
- Average speed: 117.449 miles per hour (189.016 km/h)

Pole position
Driver	Bill Elliott	Evernham Motorsports

Most laps led
Driver	Tony Stewart	Joe Gibbs Racing
- Laps: 72

Winner
No. 9	Bill Elliott	Evernham Motorsports

Television in the United States
- Network: NBC
- Announcers: Allen Bestwick, Benny Parsons, Wally Dallenbach Jr.

Radio in the United States
- Radio: MRN
- Booth announcers: Joe Moore and Barney Hall
- Turn announcers: Kurt Becker (1 & 2) and Mike Bagley (3 & 4)

The 2001 Pennzoil Freedom 400 was a NASCAR Winston Cup Series race held on November 11, 2001 at Homestead Miami Speedway in Homestead, Florida. Contested over 267 laps on the 1.5 mile (2.4 km) speedway, it was the 34th race of the 2001 NASCAR Winston Cup Series season. Bill Elliott of Evernham Motorsports won the race. The Freedom moniker was picked up following the events of 9/11.

Bill Elliott's 41st career win snapped his 226 race winless streak, the longest streak in between race wins, dating back to Darlington in 1994, as well as the 1st for Evernham Motorsports. The NBC Broadcast of the race featured a television appearance of Bill Elliott's son and future NASCAR Cup Series Champion Chase Elliott, who was 6 years old in 2001.

The event was marred by a pit road accident in which the Bill Davis Racing Dodge Intrepid of Ward Burton made contact with the Evernham Motorsports Intrepid of Casey Atwood while Burton was exiting his pit stall. Burton's car then spun and impacted members of Ricky Rudd's pit crew as they were servicing the car. The hit threw Rudd's front tire carrier, Bobby Burrell, head-first into the pit wall. The life-threatening injuries Burrell suffered in the accident resulted in NASCAR requiring all pit crew members to wear helmets.

== Top 10 results ==
Pos	No.	Driver	Team	Manufacturer
1	9	Bill Elliott	Evernham Motorsports	Dodge
2	15	Michael Waltrip	Dale Earnhardt, Inc.	Chevrolet
3	19	Casey Atwood	Evernham Motorsports	Dodge
4	99	Jeff Burton	Roush Racing	Ford
5	40	Sterling Marlin	Chip Ganassi Racing	Dodge
6	93	Dave Blaney	Bill Davis Racing	Dodge
7	29	Kevin Harvick	Richard Childress Racing	Chevrolet
8	18	Bobby Labonte	Joe Gibbs Racing	Pontiac
9	31	Jeff Green	Richard Childress Racing	Chevrolet
10	01	Jason Leffler	Chip Ganassi Racing	Dodge
