= 2001 Pepsi 400 (Michigan) =

23rd race of the 2001 NASCAR Winston Cup Series

2001 Pepsi 400 Presented by Meijer
Race details
- Race 23 of 36 in the 2001 NASCAR Winston Cup Series
- The 2001 Pepsi 400 Presented by Meijer program cover.
- Date: August 19, 2001
- Official name: 32nd Annual Pepsi 400 Presented by Meijer
- Location: Brooklyn, Michigan, Michigan International Speedway
- Course: Permanent racing facility
- Course length: 2 miles (3.2 km)
- Distance: 162 laps, 324 mi (521.427 km)
- Scheduled distance: 200 laps, 400 mi (643.737 km)
- Average speed: 140.513 miles per hour (226.134 km/h)

Pole position
Driver	Ricky Craven	PPI Motorsports
- Time: 38.272

Most laps led
Driver	Bill Elliott	Evernham Motorsports
- Laps: 57

Winner
No. 40	Sterling Marlin	Chip Ganassi Racing with Felix Sabates

Television in the United States
- Network: TNT
- Announcers: Allen Bestwick, Benny Parsons, Wally Dallenbach Jr.

Radio in the United States
- Radio: Motor Racing Network

The 2001 Pepsi 400 Presented by Meijer was the 23rd stock car race of the 2001 NASCAR Winston Cup Series and the 32nd iteration of the event. The race was held on Sunday, August 19, 2001, in Brooklyn, Michigan, at Michigan International Speedway, a two-mile (3.2 km) moderate-banked D-shaped speedway. The race was shortened from its scheduled 200 laps to 162 due to inclement weather. Sterling Marlin, driving for Chip Ganassi Racing with Felix Sabates, would control the late stages of the race when rain stopped the race to win his seventh career NASCAR Winston Cup Series victory and his first victory of the season. The win was also Dodge's first victory in the NASCAR Winston Cup Series in 24 years. To fill out the podium, Ricky Craven, driving for PPI Motorsports, and Bill Elliott, driving for Evernham Motorsports, would finish second and third, respectively.

== Background ==
The layout of Michigan International Speedway, the venue where the race was held.

The race was held at Michigan International Speedway, a two-mile (3.2 km) moderate-banked D-shaped speedway located in Brooklyn, Michigan. The track is used primarily for NASCAR events. It is known as a "sister track" to Texas World Speedway as MIS's oval design was a direct basis of TWS, with moderate modifications to the banking in the corners, and was used as the basis of Auto Club Speedway. The track is owned by International Speedway Corporation. Michigan International Speedway is recognized as one of motorsports' premier facilities because of its wide racing surface and high banking (by open-wheel standards; the 18-degree banking is modest by stock car standards).

=== Entry list ===
- (R) denotes rookie driver.

#	Driver	Team	Make
1	Steve Park	Dale Earnhardt, Inc.	Chevrolet
01	Jason Leffler (R)	Chip Ganassi Racing with Felix Sabates	Dodge
2	Rusty Wallace	Penske Racing South	Ford
4	Kevin Lepage	Morgan–McClure Motorsports	Chevrolet
5	Terry Labonte	Hendrick Motorsports	Chevrolet
6	Mark Martin	Roush Racing	Ford
7	Mike Wallace	Ultra Motorsports	Ford
8	Dale Earnhardt Jr.	Dale Earnhardt, Inc.	Chevrolet
9	Bill Elliott	Evernham Motorsports	Dodge
10	Johnny Benson Jr.	MBV Motorsports	Pontiac
11	Brett Bodine	Brett Bodine Racing	Ford
12	Jeremy Mayfield	Penske Racing South	Ford
14	Ron Hornaday Jr. (R)	A. J. Foyt Enterprises	Pontiac
15	Michael Waltrip	Dale Earnhardt, Inc.	Chevrolet
17	Matt Kenseth	Roush Racing	Ford
18	Bobby Labonte	Joe Gibbs Racing	Pontiac
19	Casey Atwood (R)	Evernham Motorsports	Dodge
20	Tony Stewart	Joe Gibbs Racing	Pontiac
21	Elliott Sadler	Wood Brothers Racing	Ford
22	Ward Burton	Bill Davis Racing	Dodge
24	Jeff Gordon	Hendrick Motorsports	Chevrolet
25	Jerry Nadeau	Hendrick Motorsports	Chevrolet
26	Jimmy Spencer	Haas-Carter Motorsports	Ford
27	Rick Mast	Eel River Racing	Pontiac
28	Ricky Rudd	Robert Yates Racing	Ford
29	Kevin Harvick (R)	Richard Childress Racing	Chevrolet
31	Mike Skinner	Richard Childress Racing	Chevrolet
32	Ricky Craven	PPI Motorsports	Ford
33	Joe Nemechek	Andy Petree Racing	Chevrolet
36	Ken Schrader	MBV Motorsports	Pontiac
40	Sterling Marlin	Chip Ganassi Racing with Felix Sabates	Dodge
43	John Andretti	Petty Enterprises	Dodge
44	Buckshot Jones	Petty Enterprises	Dodge
45	Kyle Petty	Petty Enterprises	Dodge
55	Bobby Hamilton	Andy Petree Racing	Chevrolet
57	David Keith	Team CLR	Ford
66	Todd Bodine	Haas-Carter Motorsports	Ford
77	Robert Pressley	Jasper Motorsports	Ford
88	Dale Jarrett	Robert Yates Racing	Ford
90	Hut Stricklin	Donlavey Racing	Ford
92	Stacy Compton	Melling Racing	Dodge
93	Dave Blaney	Bill Davis Racing	Dodge
96	Andy Houston (R)	PPI Motorsports	Ford
97	Kurt Busch (R)	Roush Racing	Ford
99	Jeff Burton	Roush Racing	Ford
Official entry list

== Practice ==
=== First practice ===
The first practice session was held on Friday, August 17, at 11:05 AM EST. The session would last for two hours. Ricky Rudd, driving for Robert Yates Racing, would set the fastest time in the session, with a lap of 38.455 and an average speed of 187.232 mph (301.321 km/h).

Pos.	#	Driver	Team	Make	Time	Speed
1	28	Ricky Rudd	Robert Yates Racing	Ford	38.455	187.232
2	2	Rusty Wallace	Penske Racing South	Ford	38.461	187.203
3	40	Sterling Marlin	Chip Ganassi Racing	Dodge	38.580	186.625
Full first practice results

=== Second practice ===
The second practice session was held on Saturday, August 18, at 11:15 AM EST. The session would last for 45 minutes. Jeff Gordon, driving for Hendrick Motorsports, would set the fastest time in the session, with a lap of 39.510 and an average speed of 182.232 mph (293.274 km/h).

Pos.	#	Driver	Team	Make	Time	Speed
1	24	Jeff Gordon	Hendrick Motorsports	Chevrolet	39.510	182.232
2	2	Rusty Wallace	Penske Racing South	Ford	39.650	181.589
3	22	Ward Burton	Bill Davis Racing	Dodge	39.706	181.333
Full second practice results

=== Third and final practice ===
The final practice session, sometimes referred to as Happy Hour, was held on Saturday, August 18, at 3:00 PM EST. The session would last for one hour. Rusty Wallace, driving for Penske Racing South, would set the fastest time in the session, with a lap of 39.670 and an average speed of 181.497 mph (292.091 km/h).

Pos.	#	Driver	Team	Make	Time	Speed
1	2	Rusty Wallace	Penske Racing South	Ford	39.670	181.497
2	29	Kevin Harvick (R)	Richard Childress Racing	Chevrolet	39.793	180.936
3	28	Ricky Rudd	Robert Yates Racing	Ford	39.882	180.533
Full Happy Hour practice results

== Qualifying ==
Qualifying was held on Friday, August 17, at 3:00 PM EST. Each driver would have two laps to set a fastest time; the fastest of the two would count as their official qualifying lap. Positions 1-36 would be decided on time, while positions 37-43 would be based on provisionals. Six spots are awarded by the use of provisionals based on owner's points. The seventh is awarded to a past champion who has not otherwise qualified for the race. If no past champ needs the provisional, the next team in the owner points will be awarded a provisional.

Ricky Craven, driving for PPI Motorsports, would win the pole, setting a time of 38.272 and an average speed of 188.127 miles per hour (302.761 km/h).

Two drivers would fail to qualify: David Keith and Buckshot Jones.

=== Full qualifying results ===
Pos.	#	Driver	Team	Make	Time	Speed
1	32	Ricky Craven	PPI Motorsports	Ford	38.272	188.127
2	9	Bill Elliott	Evernham Motorsports	Dodge	38.327	187.857
3	28	Ricky Rudd	Robert Yates Racing	Ford	38.393	187.534
4	21	Elliott Sadler	Wood Brothers Racing	Ford	38.458	187.217
5	43	John Andretti	Petty Enterprises	Dodge	38.469	187.164
6	19	Casey Atwood (R)	Evernham Motorsports	Dodge	38.473	187.144
7	15	Michael Waltrip	Dale Earnhardt, Inc.	Chevrolet	38.489	187.066
8	90	Hut Stricklin	Donlavey Racing	Ford	38.493	187.047
9	18	Bobby Labonte	Joe Gibbs Racing	Pontiac	38.496	187.032
10	20	Tony Stewart	Joe Gibbs Racing	Pontiac	38.535	186.843
11	01	Jason Leffler (R)	Chip Ganassi Racing with Felix Sabates	Dodge	38.554	186.751
12	8	Dale Earnhardt Jr.	Dale Earnhardt, Inc.	Chevrolet	38.577	186.640
13	24	Jeff Gordon	Hendrick Motorsports	Chevrolet	38.587	186.591
14	2	Rusty Wallace	Penske Racing South	Ford	38.602	186.519
15	40	Sterling Marlin	Chip Ganassi Racing with Felix Sabates	Dodge	38.603	186.514
16	99	Jeff Burton	Roush Racing	Ford	38.619	186.436
17	88	Dale Jarrett	Robert Yates Racing	Ford	38.636	186.355
18	26	Jimmy Spencer	Haas-Carter Motorsports	Ford	38.659	186.244
19	12	Jeremy Mayfield	Penske Racing South	Ford	38.684	186.123
20	31	Mike Skinner	Richard Childress Racing	Chevrolet	38.684	186.123
21	66	Todd Bodine	Haas-Carter Motorsports	Ford	38.688	186.104
22	10	Johnny Benson Jr.	MBV Motorsports	Pontiac	38.692	186.085
23	97	Kurt Busch (R)	Roush Racing	Ford	38.714	185.979
24	4	Kevin Lepage	Morgan–McClure Motorsports	Chevrolet	38.735	185.878
25	6	Mark Martin	Roush Racing	Ford	38.742	185.845
26	29	Kevin Harvick (R)	Richard Childress Racing	Chevrolet	38.748	185.816
27	1	Steve Park	Dale Earnhardt, Inc.	Chevrolet	38.761	185.754
28	92	Stacy Compton	Melling Racing	Dodge	38.761	185.754
29	96	Andy Houston (R)	PPI Motorsports	Ford	38.83	185.424
30	77	Robert Pressley	Jasper Motorsports	Ford	38.848	185.338
31	25	Jerry Nadeau	Hendrick Motorsports	Chevrolet	38.858	185.290
32	7	Mike Wallace	Ultra Motorsports	Ford	38.907	185.057
33	17	Matt Kenseth	Roush Racing	Ford	38.911	185.038
34	14	Ron Hornaday Jr. (R)	A. J. Foyt Enterprises	Pontiac	38.913	185.028
35	55	Bobby Hamilton	Andy Petree Racing	Chevrolet	38.949	184.857
36	45	Kyle Petty	Petty Enterprises	Dodge	38.965	184.781
Provisionals
37	22	Ward Burton	Bill Davis Racing	Dodge	-*	-*
38	36	Ken Schrader	MB2 Motorsports	Pontiac	-*	-*
39	5	Terry Labonte	Hendrick Motorsports	Chevrolet	-*	-*
40	33	Joe Nemechek	Andy Petree Racing	Chevrolet	-*	-*
41	93	Dave Blaney	Bill Davis Racing	Dodge	-*	-*
42	11	Brett Bodine	Brett Bodine Racing	Ford	-*	-*
43	27	Rick Mast	Eel River Racing	Pontiac	-*	-*
Failed to qualify
44	57	David Keith	Team CLR	Ford	38.985	184.686
45	44	Buckshot Jones	Petty Enterprises	Dodge	38.998	184.625
Official qualifying results

*Time not available.

== Race results ==
Fin	St	#	Driver	Team	Make	Laps	Led	Status	Pts	Winnings
1	15	40	Sterling Marlin	Chip Ganassi Racing with Felix Sabates	Dodge	162	18	running	180	$157,830
2	1	32	Ricky Craven	PPI Motorsports	Ford	162	0	running	170	$92,545
3	2	9	Bill Elliott	Evernham Motorsports	Dodge	162	57	running	175	$106,128
4	33	17	Matt Kenseth	Roush Racing	Ford	162	0	running	160	$70,050
5	22	10	Johnny Benson Jr.	MBV Motorsports	Pontiac	162	0	running	155	$68,015
6	41	93	Dave Blaney	Bill Davis Racing	Dodge	162	0	running	150	$49,315
7	13	24	Jeff Gordon	Hendrick Motorsports	Chevrolet	162	0	running	146	$90,692
8	25	6	Mark Martin	Roush Racing	Ford	162	4	running	147	$87,691
9	27	1	Steve Park	Dale Earnhardt, Inc.	Chevrolet	162	0	running	138	$72,883
10	6	19	Casey Atwood (R)	Evernham Motorsports	Dodge	162	0	running	134	$52,840
11	18	26	Jimmy Spencer	Haas-Carter Motorsports	Ford	162	0	running	130	$63,460
12	12	8	Dale Earnhardt Jr.	Dale Earnhardt, Inc.	Chevrolet	162	0	running	127	$75,188
13	19	12	Jeremy Mayfield	Penske Racing South	Ford	162	2	running	129	$82,949
14	30	77	Robert Pressley	Jasper Motorsports	Ford	162	0	running	121	$57,776
15	4	21	Elliott Sadler	Wood Brothers Racing	Ford	162	0	running	118	$65,830
16	16	99	Jeff Burton	Roush Racing	Ford	162	0	running	115	$86,786
17	14	2	Rusty Wallace	Penske Racing South	Ford	162	25	running	117	$83,330
18	20	31	Mike Skinner	Richard Childress Racing	Chevrolet	161	0	running	109	$73,614
19	9	18	Bobby Labonte	Joe Gibbs Racing	Pontiac	161	0	running	106	$84,617
20	38	36	Ken Schrader	MB2 Motorsports	Pontiac	161	0	running	103	$56,065
21	28	92	Stacy Compton	Melling Racing	Dodge	161	0	running	100	$40,590
22	40	33	Joe Nemechek	Andy Petree Racing	Chevrolet	161	0	running	97	$68,210
23	21	66	Todd Bodine	Haas-Carter Motorsports	Ford	161	0	running	94	$39,615
24	11	01	Jason Leffler (R)	Chip Ganassi Racing with Felix Sabates	Dodge	161	0	running	91	$47,415
25	36	45	Kyle Petty	Petty Enterprises	Dodge	161	0	running	88	$37,065
26	5	43	John Andretti	Petty Enterprises	Dodge	161	0	running	85	$73,392
27	10	20	Tony Stewart	Joe Gibbs Racing	Pontiac	161	0	running	82	$55,890
28	35	55	Bobby Hamilton	Andy Petree Racing	Chevrolet	161	0	running	79	$43,540
29	39	5	Terry Labonte	Hendrick Motorsports	Chevrolet	161	0	running	76	$68,095
30	34	14	Ron Hornaday Jr. (R)	A. J. Foyt Enterprises	Pontiac	161	3	running	78	$35,790
31	29	96	Andy Houston (R)	PPI Motorsports	Ford	161	0	running	70	$35,165
32	8	90	Hut Stricklin	Donlavey Racing	Ford	160	0	running	67	$35,090
33	37	22	Ward Burton	Bill Davis Racing	Dodge	160	0	running	64	$68,150
34	31	25	Jerry Nadeau	Hendrick Motorsports	Chevrolet	160	0	running	61	$42,940
35	32	7	Mike Wallace	Ultra Motorsports	Ford	160	0	running	58	$42,865
36	7	15	Michael Waltrip	Dale Earnhardt, Inc.	Chevrolet	160	0	running	55	$44,815
37	17	88	Dale Jarrett	Robert Yates Racing	Ford	160	2	running	57	$79,792
38	24	4	Kevin Lepage	Morgan–McClure Motorsports	Chevrolet	159	0	running	49	$34,655
39	43	27	Rick Mast	Eel River Racing	Pontiac	159	0	running	46	$34,620
40	42	11	Brett Bodine	Brett Bodine Racing	Ford	147	0	running	43	$34,560
41	26	29	Kevin Harvick (R)	Richard Childress Racing	Chevrolet	125	0	engine	40	$80,552
42	3	28	Ricky Rudd	Robert Yates Racing	Ford	120	51	engine	42	$64,957
43	23	97	Kurt Busch (R)	Roush Racing	Ford	40	0	engine	34	$41,794
Official race results

Previous race: 2001 Global Crossing at the Glen	NASCAR Winston Cup Series; 2001 season	Next race: 2001 Sharpie 500
