= 2001 Sharpie 500 =

24th race of the 2001 NASCAR Winston Cup Series

Race details
- Race 24 of 36 in the 2001 NASCAR Winston Cup Series
- The 2001 Sharpie 500 program cover.
- Date: August 25, 2001
- Official name: 41st Annual Sharpie 500
- Location: Bristol, Tennessee, Bristol Motor Speedway
- Course: Permanent racing facility
- Course length: 0.533 miles (0.858 km)
- Distance: 500 laps, 266.5 mi (428.89 km)
- Average speed: 85.106 miles per hour (136.965 km/h)

Pole position
Driver	Jeff Green	Richard Childress Racing
- Time: 15.515

Most laps led
Driver	Jeff Gordon	Hendrick Motorsports
- Laps: 199

Winner
No. 20	Tony Stewart	Joe Gibbs Racing

Television in the United States
- Network: TNT
- Announcers: Allen Bestwick, Benny Parsons, Wally Dallenbach Jr.

Radio in the United States
- Radio: Performance Racing Network
- Booth announcers: Doug Rice, Mark Garrow
- Turn announcers: Chuck Carland

The 2001 Sharpie 500 was the 24th stock car race of the 2001 NASCAR Winston Cup Series and the 41st iteration of the event. The race was held on Saturday, August 25, 2001, in Bristol, Tennessee at Bristol Motor Speedway, a 0.533 miles (0.858 km) permanent oval-shaped racetrack. The race took the scheduled 500 laps to complete. At race's end, Tony Stewart, driving for Joe Gibbs Racing, would control the late stages of the race to win his 12th career NASCAR Winston Cup Series victory and his third and final victory of the season. To fill out the podium, Kevin Harvick, driving for Richard Childress Racing, and Jeff Gordon, driving for Hendrick Motorsports, would finish second and third, respectively.

== Background ==
The layout of Bristol Motor Speedway, the venue where the race was held.

The Bristol Motor Speedway, formerly known as Bristol International Raceway and Bristol Raceway, is a NASCAR short track venue located in Bristol, Tennessee. Constructed in 1960, it held its first NASCAR race on July 30, 1961. Despite its short length, Bristol is among the most popular tracks on the NASCAR schedule because of its distinct features, which include extraordinarily steep banking, an all concrete surface, two pit roads, and stadium-like seating. It has also been named one of the loudest NASCAR tracks.

=== Entry list ===
- (R) denotes rookie driver.
- (i) denotes driver who is ineligible for series driver points.

#	Driver	Team	Make
1	Steve Park	Dale Earnhardt, Inc.	Chevrolet
01	Jason Leffler (R)	Chip Ganassi Racing with Felix Sabates	Dodge
2	Rusty Wallace	Penske Racing South	Ford
4	Kevin Lepage	Morgan–McClure Motorsports	Chevrolet
5	Terry Labonte	Hendrick Motorsports	Chevrolet
6	Mark Martin	Roush Racing	Ford
7	Mike Wallace	Ultra Motorsports	Ford
8	Dale Earnhardt Jr.	Dale Earnhardt, Inc.	Chevrolet
9	Bill Elliott	Evernham Motorsports	Dodge
09	Geoff Bodine (i)	Phoenix Racing	Ford
10	Johnny Benson Jr.	MBV Motorsports	Pontiac
11	Brett Bodine	Brett Bodine Racing	Ford
12	Jeremy Mayfield	Penske Racing South	Ford
13	Hermie Sadler	SCORE Motorsports	Chevrolet
14	Ron Hornaday Jr. (R)	A. J. Foyt Enterprises	Pontiac
15	Michael Waltrip	Dale Earnhardt, Inc.	Chevrolet
17	Matt Kenseth	RFK Racing	Ford
18	Bobby Labonte	Joe Gibbs Racing	Pontiac
19	Casey Atwood (R)	Evernham Motorsports	Dodge
20	Tony Stewart	Joe Gibbs Racing	Pontiac
21	Elliott Sadler	Wood Brothers Racing	Ford
22	Ward Burton	Bill Davis Racing	Dodge
24	Jeff Gordon	Hendrick Motorsports	Chevrolet
25	Jerry Nadeau	Hendrick Motorsports	Chevrolet
26	Jimmy Spencer	Haas-Carter Motorsports	Ford
27	Rick Mast	Eel River Racing	Pontiac
28	Ricky Rudd	Robert Yates Racing	Ford
29	Kevin Harvick (R)	Richard Childress Racing	Chevrolet
30	Jeff Green	Richard Childress Racing	Chevrolet
31	Mike Skinner	Richard Childress Racing	Chevrolet
32	Ricky Craven	PPI Motorsports	Ford
33	Joe Nemechek	Andy Petree Racing	Chevrolet
36	Ken Schrader	MBV Motorsports	Pontiac
40	Sterling Marlin	Chip Ganassi Racing with Felix Sabates	Dodge
43	John Andretti	Petty Enterprises	Dodge
44	Buckshot Jones	Petty Enterprises	Dodge
45	Kyle Petty	Petty Enterprises	Dodge
55	Bobby Hamilton	Andy Petree Racing	Chevrolet
66	Todd Bodine	Haas-Carter Motorsports	Ford
71	Dave Marcis	Marcis Auto Racing	Chevrolet
77	Robert Pressley	Jasper Motorsports	Ford
85	Carl Long	Mansion Motorsports	Ford
88	Dale Jarrett	Robert Yates Racing	Ford
90	Hut Stricklin	Donlavey Racing	Ford
92	Stacy Compton	Melling Racing	Dodge
93	Dave Blaney	Bill Davis Racing	Dodge
96	Andy Houston (R)	PPI Motorsports	Ford
97	Kurt Busch (R)	Roush Racing	Ford
99	Jeff Burton	Roush Racing	Ford
Official entry list

== Practice ==
=== First practice ===
The first practice session was held on Friday, August 24, at 11:30 AM EST. The session would last for two hours. Jeff Green, driving for Richard Childress Racing, would set the fastest time in the session, with a lap of 15.276 and an average speed of 125.609 miles per hour (202.148 km/h).

Pos.	#	Driver	Team	Make	Time	Speed
1	30	Jeff Green	Richard Childress Racing	Chevrolet	15.276	125.609
2	29	Kevin Harvick (R)	Richard Childress Racing	Chevrolet	15.336	125.117
3	21	Elliott Sadler	Wood Brothers Racing	Ford	15.406	124.549
Full first practice results

=== Second and final practice ===
The second and final practice session, sometimes referred to as Happy Hour, was held on Friday, August 24, at 5:45 PM EST. The session would last for one hour and 30 minutes. Elliott Sadler, driving for Wood Brothers Racing, would set the fastest time in the session, with a lap of 15.929 and an average speed of 120.460 miles per hour (193.862 km/h).

Pos.	#	Driver	Team	Make	Time	Speed
1	21	Elliott Sadler	Wood Brothers Racing	Ford	15.929	120.460
2	30	Jeff Green	Richard Childress Racing	Chevrolet	15.961	120.218
3	28	Ricky Rudd	Robert Yates Racing	Ford	15.981	120.068
Full Happy Hour practice results

== Qualifying ==
Qualifying was held on Friday, August 24, at 3:00 PM EST. Each driver would have two laps to set a fastest time; the fastest of the two would count as their official qualifying lap. Positions 1-36 would be decided on time, while positions 37-43 would be based on provisionals. Six spots are awarded by the use of provisionals based on owner's points. The seventh is awarded to a past champion who has not otherwise qualified for the race. If no past champ needs the provisional, the next team in the owner points will be awarded a provisional.

Jeff Green, driving for Richard Childress Racing, would win the pole, setting a time of 15.515 and an average speed of 123.674 miles per hour (199.034 km/h).

=== Full qualifying results ===
Pos.	#	Driver	Team	Make	Time	Speed
1	30	Jeff Green	Richard Childress Racing	Chevrolet	15.515	123.674
2	31	Mike Skinner	Richard Childress Racing	Chevrolet	15.539	123.483
3	14	Ron Hornaday Jr. (R)	A. J. Foyt Enterprises	Pontiac	15.543	123.451
4	21	Elliott Sadler	Wood Brothers Racing	Ford	15.549	123.403
5	28	Ricky Rudd	Robert Yates Racing	Ford	15.550	123.395
6	24	Jeff Gordon	Hendrick Motorsports	Chevrolet	15.557	123.340
7	88	Dale Jarrett	Robert Yates Racing	Ford	15.571	123.229
8	29	Kevin Harvick (R)	Richard Childress Racing	Chevrolet	15.592	123.063
9	2	Rusty Wallace	Penske Racing South	Ford	15.621	122.835
10	66	Todd Bodine	Haas-Carter Motorsports	Ford	15.637	122.709
11	36	Ken Schrader	MBV Motorsports	Pontiac	15.638	122.701
12	25	Jerry Nadeau	Hendrick Motorsports	Chevrolet	15.643	122.662
13	09	Geoff Bodine (i)	Phoenix Racing	Ford	15.646	122.638
14	22	Ward Burton	Bill Davis Racing	Dodge	15.661	122.521
15	55	Bobby Hamilton	Andy Petree Racing	Chevrolet	15.662	122.513
16	18	Bobby Labonte	Joe Gibbs Racing	Pontiac	15.669	122.458
17	40	Sterling Marlin	Chip Ganassi Racing with Felix Sabates	Dodge	15.684	122.341
18	20	Tony Stewart	Joe Gibbs Racing	Pontiac	15.684	122.341
19	77	Robert Pressley	Jasper Motorsports	Ford	15.686	122.326
20	11	Brett Bodine	Brett Bodine Racing	Ford	15.687	122.318
21	5	Terry Labonte	Hendrick Motorsports	Chevrolet	15.697	122.240
22	99	Jeff Burton	Roush Racing	Ford	15.705	122.178
23	26	Jimmy Spencer	Haas-Carter Motorsports	Ford	15.714	122.108
24	8	Dale Earnhardt Jr.	Dale Earnhardt, Inc.	Chevrolet	15.715	122.100
25	4	Kevin Lepage	Morgan–McClure Motorsports	Chevrolet	15.716	122.092
26	97	Kurt Busch (R)	Roush Racing	Ford	15.719	122.069
27	7	Mike Wallace	Ultra Motorsports	Ford	15.737	121.929
28	93	Dave Blaney	Bill Davis Racing	Dodge	15.740	121.906
29	10	Johnny Benson Jr.	MBV Motorsports	Pontiac	15.754	121.798
30	12	Jeremy Mayfield	Penske Racing South	Ford	15.756	121.782
31	6	Mark Martin	Roush Racing	Ford	15.764	121.720
32	27	Rick Mast	Eel River Racing	Pontiac	15.767	121.697
33	96	Andy Houston (R)	PPI Motorsports	Ford	15.778	121.612
34	19	Casey Atwood (R)	Evernham Motorsports	Dodge	15.783	121.574
35	9	Bill Elliott	Evernham Motorsports	Dodge	15.784	121.566
36	44	Buckshot Jones	Petty Enterprises	Dodge	15.787	121.543
Provisionals
37	1	Steve Park	Dale Earnhardt, Inc.	Chevrolet	15.801	121.435
38	17	Matt Kenseth	Roush Racing	Ford	15.806	121.397
39	32	Ricky Craven	PPI Motorsports	Ford	15.839	121.144
40	15	Michael Waltrip	Dale Earnhardt, Inc.	Chevrolet	16.002	119.910
41	33	Joe Nemechek	Andy Petree Racing	Chevrolet	15.804	121.412
42	43	John Andretti	Petty Enterprises	Dodge	15.883	120.809
43	01	Jason Leffler (R)	Chip Ganassi Racing with Felix Sabates	Dodge	15.819	121.297
Failed to qualify
44	92	Stacy Compton	Melling Racing	Dodge	15.836	121.167
45	45	Kyle Petty	Petty Enterprises	Dodge	15.861	120.976
46	13	Hermie Sadler	SCORE Motorsports	Chevrolet	15.887	120.778
47	71	Dave Marcis	Marcis Auto Racing	Chevrolet	15.900	120.679
48	90	Hut Stricklin	Donlavey Racing	Ford	16.017	119.798
49	85	Carl Long	Mansion Motorsports	Ford	16.165	118.701
Official qualifying results

== Race results ==
Fin	St	#	Driver	Team	Make	Laps	Led	Status	Pts	Winnings
1	18	20	Tony Stewart	Joe Gibbs Racing	Pontiac	500	71	running	180	$189,415
2	8	29	Kevin Harvick (R)	Richard Childress Racing	Chevrolet	500	0	running	170	$167,267
3	6	24	Jeff Gordon	Hendrick Motorsports	Chevrolet	500	199	running	175	$155,692
4	5	28	Ricky Rudd	Robert Yates Racing	Ford	500	3	running	165	$124,527
5	9	2	Rusty Wallace	Penske Racing South	Ford	500	123	running	160	$107,640
6	7	88	Dale Jarrett	Robert Yates Racing	Ford	500	0	running	150	$115,482
7	37	1	Steve Park	Dale Earnhardt, Inc.	Chevrolet	500	9	running	151	$90,533
8	16	18	Bobby Labonte	Joe Gibbs Racing	Pontiac	500	0	running	142	$110,817
9	17	40	Sterling Marlin	Chip Ganassi Racing with Felix Sabates	Dodge	500	0	running	138	$81,500
10	21	5	Terry Labonte	Hendrick Motorsports	Chevrolet	500	0	running	134	$97,720
11	4	21	Elliott Sadler	Wood Brothers Racing	Ford	500	0	running	130	$83,860
12	14	22	Ward Burton	Bill Davis Racing	Dodge	500	0	running	127	$90,775
13	25	4	Kevin Lepage	Morgan–McClure Motorsports	Chevrolet	500	10	running	129	$63,801
14	24	8	Dale Earnhardt Jr.	Dale Earnhardt, Inc.	Chevrolet	500	0	running	121	$85,063
15	22	99	Jeff Burton	Roush Racing	Ford	500	0	running	118	$99,506
16	30	12	Jeremy Mayfield	Penske Racing South	Ford	499	0	running	115	$93,144
17	34	19	Casey Atwood (R)	Evernham Motorsports	Dodge	499	0	running	112	$53,510
18	28	93	Dave Blaney	Bill Davis Racing	Dodge	498	0	running	109	$53,250
19	35	9	Bill Elliott	Evernham Motorsports	Dodge	496	0	running	106	$77,748
20	12	25	Jerry Nadeau	Hendrick Motorsports	Chevrolet	496	0	running	103	$64,185
21	42	43	John Andretti	Petty Enterprises	Dodge	496	0	running	100	$88,487
22	11	36	Ken Schrader	MBV Motorsports	Pontiac	495	0	running	97	$64,800
23	15	55	Bobby Hamilton	Andy Petree Racing	Chevrolet	495	0	running	94	$59,560
24	41	33	Joe Nemechek	Andy Petree Racing	Chevrolet	493	0	running	91	$79,155
25	26	97	Kurt Busch (R)	Roush Racing	Ford	490	0	running	88	$58,980
26	20	11	Brett Bodine	Brett Bodine Racing	Ford	488	0	running	85	$52,390
27	13	09	Geoff Bodine (i)	Phoenix Racing	Ford	486	0	running	0	$45,305
28	19	77	Robert Pressley	Jasper Motorsports	Ford	442	0	running	79	$54,795
29	3	14	Ron Hornaday Jr. (R)	A. J. Foyt Enterprises	Pontiac	441	0	running	76	$44,085
30	43	01	Jason Leffler (R)	Chip Ganassi Racing with Felix Sabates	Dodge	436	0	running	73	$52,025
31	27	7	Mike Wallace	Ultra Motorsports	Ford	421	0	running	70	$51,415
32	10	66	Todd Bodine	Haas-Carter Motorsports	Ford	396	0	crash	67	$43,330
33	38	17	Matt Kenseth	Roush Racing	Ford	394	0	crash	64	$51,295
34	2	31	Mike Skinner	Richard Childress Racing	Chevrolet	383	0	running	61	$76,084
35	23	26	Jimmy Spencer	Haas-Carter Motorsports	Ford	374	0	engine	58	$51,230
36	29	10	Johnny Benson Jr.	MBV Motorsports	Pontiac	343	0	crash	55	$51,185
37	31	6	Mark Martin	Roush Racing	Ford	336	0	running	52	$87,470
38	39	32	Ricky Craven	PPI Motorsports	Ford	239	14	crash	54	$43,050
39	40	15	Michael Waltrip	Dale Earnhardt, Inc.	Chevrolet	233	0	crash	46	$53,000
40	33	96	Andy Houston (R)	PPI Motorsports	Ford	127	0	crash	43	$42,925
41	32	27	Rick Mast	Eel River Racing	Pontiac	113	0	crash	40	$42,875
42	1	30	Jeff Green	Richard Childress Racing	Chevrolet	85	71	crash	42	$47,825
43	36	44	Buckshot Jones	Petty Enterprises	Dodge	67	0	crash	34	$51,022
Official race results

Previous race: 2001 Pepsi 400 Presented by Meijer	NASCAR Winston Cup Series; 2001 season	Next race: 2001 Mountain Dew Southern 500
