= 2003 Samsung/RadioShack 500 =

Seventh race of 2003 NASCAR Winston Cup Series

Race details
- Race 7 of 36 in the 2003 NASCAR Winston Cup Series
- The 2003 Samsung/RadioShack 500 program cover, with artwork by NASCAR artist Sam Bass. The painting is called "Most Wanted!"
- Date: March 30, 2003
- Official name: 7th Annual Samsung/RadioShack 500
- Location: Fort Worth, Texas, Texas Motor Speedway
- Course: Permanent racing facility
- Course length: 1.5 miles (2.41 km)
- Distance: 334 laps, 501 mi (806.281 km)
- Scheduled distance: 334 laps, 501 mi (806.281 km)
- Average speed: 134.517 miles per hour (216.484 km/h)
- Attendance: 215,000

Pole position
Driver	Bobby Labonte	Joe Gibbs Racing
- Time: 27.905

Most laps led
Driver	Elliott Sadler	Robert Yates Racing
- Laps: 91

Winner
No. 12	Ryan Newman	Penske Racing

Television in the United States
- Network: FOX
- Announcers: Mike Joy, Larry McReynolds, Darrell Waltrip

Radio in the United States
- Radio: Performance Racing Network

The 2003 Samsung/RadioShack 500 was the seventh stock car race of the 2003 NASCAR Winston Cup Series season and the seventh iteration of the event. The race was held on Sunday, March 30, 2003, before a crowd of 215,000 in Fort Worth, Texas at Texas Motor Speedway, a 1.5 miles (2.4 km) permanent tri-oval shaped racetrack. The race took the scheduled 334 laps to complete. Penske Racing driver Ryan Newman would make a gamble near the end of the race, pitting for only two tires on the final round of pit stops. He would be able to pass and defend Dale Earnhardt, Inc. driver Dale Earnhardt Jr. to win his second career NASCAR Winston Cup Series win and his first win of the season. To fill out the podium, Jeff Gordon of Hendrick Motorsports would finish 3rd.

== Background ==
The layout of Texas Motor Speedway, the venue where the race as held.

Texas Motor Speedway is a speedway located in the northernmost portion of Fort Worth, Texas. The track measures 1.5 miles (2.4 km) around and is banked 24 degrees in the turns, and is of the oval design, where the front straightaway juts outward slightly. The track is owned by Speedway Motorsports.

=== Entry list ===
#	Driver	Team	Make
0	Jack Sprague	Haas CNC Racing	Pontiac
1	Steve Park	Dale Earnhardt, Inc.	Chevrolet
01	Jerry Nadeau	MB2 Motorsports	Pontiac
2	Rusty Wallace	Penske Racing	Dodge
4	Mike Skinner	Morgan–McClure Motorsports	Pontiac
5	Terry Labonte	Hendrick Motorsports	Chevrolet
6	Mark Martin	Roush Racing	Ford
7	Jimmy Spencer	Ultra Motorsports	Dodge
8	Dale Earnhardt Jr.	Dale Earnhardt, Inc.	Chevrolet
9	Bill Elliott	Evernham Motorsports	Dodge
10	Johnny Benson Jr.	MB2 Motorsports	Pontiac
11	Brett Bodine	Brett Bodine Racing	Ford
12	Ryan Newman	Penske Racing	Dodge
14	Larry Foyt	A. J. Foyt Enterprises	Dodge
15	Michael Waltrip	Dale Earnhardt, Inc.	Chevrolet
16	Greg Biffle	Roush Racing	Ford
17	Matt Kenseth	Roush Racing	Ford
18	Bobby Labonte	Joe Gibbs Racing	Chevrolet
19	Jeremy Mayfield	Evernham Motorsports	Dodge
20	Tony Stewart	Joe Gibbs Racing	Chevrolet
21	Ricky Rudd	Wood Brothers Racing	Ford
22	Ward Burton	Bill Davis Racing	Dodge
23	Kenny Wallace	Bill Davis Racing	Dodge
24	Jeff Gordon	Hendrick Motorsports	Chevrolet
25	Joe Nemechek	Hendrick Motorsports	Chevrolet
29	Kevin Harvick	Richard Childress Racing	Chevrolet
30	Jeff Green	Richard Childress Racing	Chevrolet
31	Robby Gordon	Richard Childress Racing	Chevrolet
32	Ricky Craven	PPI Motorsports	Pontiac
38	Elliott Sadler	Robert Yates Racing	Ford
40	Sterling Marlin	Chip Ganassi Racing	Dodge
41	Casey Mears	Chip Ganassi Racing	Dodge
42	Jamie McMurray	Chip Ganassi Racing	Dodge
43	John Andretti	Petty Enterprises	Dodge
45	Kyle Petty	Petty Enterprises	Dodge
48	Jimmie Johnson	Hendrick Motorsports	Chevrolet
49	Ken Schrader	BAM Racing	Dodge
54	Todd Bodine	BelCar Motorsports	Ford
74	Tony Raines	BACE Motorsports	Chevrolet
75	David Starr	Mike Starr Racing	Chevrolet
77	Dave Blaney	Jasper Motorsports	Ford
83	Kerry Earnhardt	FitzBradshaw Racing	Chevrolet
88	Dale Jarrett	Robert Yates Racing	Ford
97	Kurt Busch	Roush Racing	Ford
99	Jeff Burton	Roush Racing	Ford
Official entry list

== Practice ==
=== First practice ===
The first practice session was held on Friday, March 28, at 12:20 PM CST, and would last for 2 hours. Jerry Nadeau of MB2 Motorsports would set the fastest time in the session, with a lap of 27.870 and an average speed of 193.757 miles per hour (311.822 km/h).

Pos.	#	Driver	Team	Make	Time	Speed
1	01	Jerry Nadeau	MB2 Motorsports	Pontiac	27.870	193.757
2	12	Ryan Newman	Penske Racing	Dodge	27.925	193.375
3	48	Jimmie Johnson	Hendrick Motorsports	Chevrolet	28.015	192.754
Full first practice results

=== Second practice ===
The second practice session was held on Saturday, March 29, at 10:30 AM CST, and would last for 45 minutes. Bobby Labonte of Joe Gibbs Racing would set the fastest time in the session, with a lap of 28.620 and an average speed of 188.679 miles per hour (303.649 km/h).

Pos.	#	Driver	Team	Make	Time	Speed
1	18	Bobby Labonte	Joe Gibbs Racing	Chevrolet	28.620	188.679
2	48	Jimmie Johnson	Hendrick Motorsports	Chevrolet	28.661	188.409
3	9	Bill Elliott	Evernham Motorsports	Dodge	28.668	188.363
Full second practice results

=== Third and final practice ===
The third and final practice session, sometimes referred to as Happy Hour, was held on Saturday, March 29, at 12:10 PM CST, and would last for 45 minutes. Jimmie Johnson of Hendrick Motorsports would set the fastest time in the session, with a lap of 28.574 and an average speed of 188.983 miles per hour (304.139 km/h).

Pos.	#	Driver	Team	Make	Time	Speed
1	48	Jimmie Johnson	Hendrick Motorsports	Chevrolet	28.574	188.983
2	12	Ryan Newman	Penske Racing	Dodge	28.612	188.732
3	01	Jerry Nadeau	MB2 Motorsports	Pontiac	28.776	187.656
Full Happy Hour practice results

== Qualifying ==
Qualifying was held on Friday, March 28, at 4:05 PM CST. Each driver would have two laps to set a fastest time; the fastest of the two would count as their official qualifying lap. Positions 1-36 would be decided on time, while positions 37-43 would be based on provisionals. Six spots are awarded by the use of provisionals based on owner's points. The seventh is awarded to a past champion who has not otherwise qualified for the race. If no past champ needs the provisional, the next team in the owner points will be awarded a provisional.

Bobby Labonte of Joe Gibbs Racing would win the pole, setting a time of 27.905 and an average speed of 193.514 miles per hour (311.431 km/h).

Two drivers would fail to qualify: Kerry Earnhardt and David Starr.

=== Full qualifying results ===
Pos.	#	Driver	Team	Make	Time	Speed
1	18	Bobby Labonte	Joe Gibbs Racing	Chevrolet	27.905	193.514
2	38	Elliott Sadler	Robert Yates Racing	Ford	27.934	193.313
3	12	Ryan Newman	Penske Racing	Dodge	27.959	193.140
4	48	Jimmie Johnson	Hendrick Motorsports	Chevrolet	28.016	192.747
5	01	Jerry Nadeau	MB2 Motorsports	Pontiac	28.033	192.630
6	9	Bill Elliott	Evernham Motorsports	Dodge	28.082	192.294
7	24	Jeff Gordon	Hendrick Motorsports	Chevrolet	28.092	192.225
8	29	Kevin Harvick	Richard Childress Racing	Chevrolet	28.119	192.041
9	25	Joe Nemechek	Hendrick Motorsports	Chevrolet	28.122	192.020
10	2	Rusty Wallace	Penske Racing	Dodge	28.148	191.843
11	8	Dale Earnhardt Jr.	Dale Earnhardt, Inc.	Chevrolet	28.168	191.707
12	5	Terry Labonte	Hendrick Motorsports	Chevrolet	28.217	191.374
13	10	Johnny Benson Jr.	MB2 Motorsports	Pontiac	28.232	191.272
14	30	Jeff Green	Richard Childress Racing	Chevrolet	28.239	191.225
15	1	Steve Park	Dale Earnhardt, Inc.	Chevrolet	28.301	190.806
16	21	Ricky Rudd	Wood Brothers Racing	Ford	28.306	190.772
17	17	Matt Kenseth	Roush Racing	Ford	28.311	190.739
18	7	Jimmy Spencer	Ultra Motorsports	Dodge	28.333	190.590
19	54	Todd Bodine	BelCar Motorsports	Ford	28.340	190.543
20	16	Greg Biffle	Roush Racing	Ford	28.371	190.335
21	31	Robby Gordon	Richard Childress Racing	Chevrolet	28.376	190.302
22	20	Tony Stewart	Joe Gibbs Racing	Chevrolet	28.398	190.154
23	88	Dale Jarrett	Robert Yates Racing	Ford	28.413	190.054
24	42	Jamie McMurray	Chip Ganassi Racing	Dodge	28.449	189.813
25	11	Brett Bodine	Brett Bodine Racing	Ford	28.452	189.793
26	41	Casey Mears	Chip Ganassi Racing	Dodge	28.456	189.767
27	19	Jeremy Mayfield	Evernham Motorsports	Dodge	28.461	189.733
28	45	Kyle Petty	Petty Enterprises	Dodge	28.478	189.620
29	99	Jeff Burton	Roush Racing	Ford	28.494	189.514
30	97	Kurt Busch	Roush Racing	Ford	28.500	189.474
31	0	Jack Sprague	Haas CNC Racing	Pontiac	28.536	189.235
32	6	Mark Martin	Roush Racing	Ford	28.541	189.202
33	22	Ward Burton	Bill Davis Racing	Dodge	28.546	189.168
34	74	Tony Raines	BACE Motorsports	Chevrolet	28.611	188.739
35	14	Larry Foyt	A. J. Foyt Enterprises	Dodge	28.612	188.732
36	40	Sterling Marlin	Chip Ganassi Racing	Dodge	28.613	188.725
Provisionals
37	15	Michael Waltrip	Dale Earnhardt, Inc.	Chevrolet	29.027	186.034
38	32	Ricky Craven	PPI Motorsports	Pontiac	—	—
39	77	Dave Blaney	Jasper Motorsports	Ford	28.646	188.508
40	23	Kenny Wallace	Bill Davis Racing	Dodge	28.621	188.673
41	4	Mike Skinner	Morgan–McClure Motorsports	Pontiac	28.864	187.084
42	49	Ken Schrader	BAM Racing	Dodge	28.773	187.676
43	43	John Andretti	Petty Enterprises	Dodge	28.751	187.820
Failed to qualify
44	83	Kerry Earnhardt	FitzBradshaw Racing	Chevrolet	28.877	187.000
45	75	David Starr	Mike Starr Racing	Chevrolet	28.914	186.761
Official qualifying results

== Race results ==
Fin	St	#	Driver	Team	Make	Laps	Led	Status	Pts	Winnings
1	3	12	Ryan Newman	Penske Racing	Dodge	334	77	running	180	$406,500
2	11	8	Dale Earnhardt Jr.	Dale Earnhardt, Inc.	Chevrolet	334	35	running	175	$299,667
3	7	24	Jeff Gordon	Hendrick Motorsports	Chevrolet	334	16	running	170	$249,753
4	5	01	Jerry Nadeau	MB2 Motorsports	Pontiac	334	0	running	160	$187,725
5	32	6	Mark Martin	Roush Racing	Ford	334	0	running	155	$173,058
6	17	17	Matt Kenseth	Roush Racing	Ford	334	65	running	155	$142,950
7	14	30	Jeff Green	Richard Childress Racing	Chevrolet	334	2	running	151	$118,575
8	4	48	Jimmie Johnson	Hendrick Motorsports	Chevrolet	334	0	running	142	$119,575
9	30	97	Kurt Busch	Roush Racing	Ford	334	0	running	138	$133,150
10	24	42	Jamie McMurray	Chip Ganassi Racing	Dodge	334	0	running	134	$101,150
11	19	54	Todd Bodine	BelCar Motorsports	Ford	334	0	running	130	$111,750
12	33	22	Ward Burton	Bill Davis Racing	Dodge	334	0	running	127	$127,906
13	23	88	Dale Jarrett	Robert Yates Racing	Ford	334	1	running	129	$136,528
14	10	2	Rusty Wallace	Penske Racing	Dodge	333	0	running	121	$126,692
15	8	29	Kevin Harvick	Richard Childress Racing	Chevrolet	333	0	running	118	$128,128
16	12	5	Terry Labonte	Hendrick Motorsports	Chevrolet	333	0	running	115	$115,656
17	37	15	Michael Waltrip	Dale Earnhardt, Inc.	Chevrolet	333	0	running	112	$102,500
18	21	31	Robby Gordon	Richard Childress Racing	Chevrolet	333	0	running	109	$112,387
19	43	43	John Andretti	Petty Enterprises	Dodge	333	0	running	106	$121,753
20	29	99	Jeff Burton	Roush Racing	Ford	333	0	running	103	$120,492
21	38	32	Ricky Craven	PPI Motorsports	Pontiac	333	2	running	105	$102,075
22	31	0	Jack Sprague	Haas CNC Racing	Pontiac	333	0	running	97	$78,975
23	40	23	Kenny Wallace	Bill Davis Racing	Dodge	333	0	running	94	$90,164
24	42	49	Ken Schrader	BAM Racing	Dodge	333	0	running	91	$75,975
25	27	19	Jeremy Mayfield	Evernham Motorsports	Dodge	332	0	running	88	$85,525
26	16	21	Ricky Rudd	Wood Brothers Racing	Ford	332	0	running	85	$84,175
27	26	41	Casey Mears	Chip Ganassi Racing	Dodge	331	0	running	82	$82,475
28	20	16	Greg Biffle	Roush Racing	Ford	330	0	running	79	$68,975
29	36	40	Sterling Marlin	Chip Ganassi Racing	Dodge	328	0	running	76	$111,475
30	35	14	Larry Foyt	A. J. Foyt Enterprises	Dodge	326	0	running	73	$69,185
31	25	11	Brett Bodine	Brett Bodine Racing	Ford	325	0	running	70	$67,775
32	13	10	Johnny Benson Jr.	MB2 Motorsports	Pontiac	322	0	engine	67	$92,450
33	18	7	Jimmy Spencer	Ultra Motorsports	Dodge	294	1	crash	69	$63,075
34	22	20	Tony Stewart	Joe Gibbs Racing	Chevrolet	293	0	engine	61	$113,728
35	9	25	Joe Nemechek	Hendrick Motorsports	Chevrolet	279	0	crash	58	$60,125
36	39	77	Dave Blaney	Jasper Motorsports	Ford	268	0	engine	55	$67,075
37	1	18	Bobby Labonte	Joe Gibbs Racing	Chevrolet	260	0	crash	52	$117,108
38	28	45	Christian Fittipaldi	Petty Enterprises	Dodge	240	0	crash	49	$64,950
39	15	1	Steve Park	Dale Earnhardt, Inc.	Chevrolet	234	1	crash	51	$82,087
40	41	4	Mike Skinner	Morgan–McClure Motorsports	Pontiac	233	0	crash	43	$56,850
41	2	38	Elliott Sadler	Robert Yates Racing	Ford	167	91	crash	50	$92,060
42	34	74	Tony Raines	BACE Motorsports	Chevrolet	152	0	engine	37	$56,765
43	6	9	Bill Elliott	Evernham Motorsports	Dodge	46	43	engine	39	$100,781
Official race results

Previous race: 2003 Food City 500	NASCAR Winston Cup Series; 2003 season	Next race: 2003 Aaron's 499
