= Barry Dodson =

American NASCAR crew chief

Personal information
- Born: June 4, 1953 Winston-Salem, North Carolina, U.S.
- Died: December 20, 2017 (aged 64) Winston-Salem, North Carolina, U.S.
- Occupations: Crew Chief, Mechanic
- Years active: 1979 to 2007

Sport
- Sport: motor racing
- League: NASCAR
- Team: Blue Max Racing
- Retired: 2007

Achievements and titles
- National finals: 1989 NASCAR Cup Series champion

Barry Dodson (June 4, 1953 – December 20, 2017) was an American stock car racing crew chief. Dodson is best known as the crew chief for Rusty Wallace, who won the 1989 NASCAR Winston Cup Series championship for Raymond Beadles' Blue Max Racing team.

== Racing career ==
Dodson began racing in $99 claim races at Bowman Gray Stadium. He then worked six years for Petty Enterprises in the Winston Cup Series (now the NASCAR Cup Series). Dodson was hired by M.C. Anderson in 1979 to work on Benny Parsons' team before switching to Anderson's other driver, Cale Yarborough. He left with Yarborough in 1983 and they joined Harry Ranier's team.

Dodson was a NASCAR crew chief for the first time in 1985. Driver Tim Richmond finished eleventh in points with 13 top-ten and 3 top-five finishes in 28 races.

Dodson moved to Blue Max Racing in 1986; Rusty Wallace won two races that season and finished sixth in points. In 1987, Wallace won twice and finished fifth in points. In 1988, Wallace won six times and finished second in points. Wallace won the 1989 championship after winning six races and four pole positions. Dodson ran Wallace's pits for the final time in 1990. The team had two wins and finished sixth in points before disbanding.

Dodson was hired by Sam McMahon on Team III Racing in 1991; the team has a variety of drivers. Dodson was then hired by Bob Whitcomb in 1992 with driver Derrike Cope.

Owner-driver Darrell Waltrip hired Dodson in 1993 as crew chief for his team. Dodson was the crew chief until after the 15th race of the 1994 season. Felix Sabates hired Dodson for the 1995 season and driver Kyle Petty recorded Dodson's final win as a Cup crew chief; the union lasted for the first 25 races.

Dodson was the crew chief in the NASCAR Craftsman Truck Series from 1995 until 1998 for Ultra Motorsports with owner Jim Smith. Ultra's driver Mike Bliss won six races in the period. Bliss finished in the top-ten season points for all four seasons.

Wallace later hired Dodson as the general manager for his son Stephen's NASCAR O'Reilly Auto Parts Series team. Dodson's final truck crew chief race happened in 2007.

== Personal life ==
Dodson grew up in Winston-Salem, North Carolina with Danny "Chocolate" Myers and the two young pals sat together in the grandstands of Bowman Gray Stadium. Barry also was a close friend to Randy Owens, Richard Petty's brother-in-law. Randy was killed in an accident during a pit stop at Talladega, Ala. Barry married Randy's widow and adopted their children. Dodson and wife Jan Kirk Dodson had two more children, Tery and Tia Jan. Trey was a talented baseball player and was set to be drafted by MLB teams in 1995. Tragedy struck the family when Trey, 17, and sister Tian Jan, 16, were killed in an automobile accident near Darlington, S.C., on November 26, 1994.

== Death ==
Dodson passed away in Winston-Salem, North Carolina on December 20, 2017, at age 64, after a brief illness.
