= 2001 Global Crossing at the Glen =

22nd race of the 2001 NASCAR Winston Cup Series

2001 Global Crossing at The Glen
Race details
- Race 22 of 36 in the 2001 NASCAR Winston Cup Series
- The 2001 Global Crossing at The Glen program cover, featuring Steve Park.
- Date: August 12, 2001
- Official name: 16th Annual Global Crossing at The Glen
- Location: Watkins Glen, New York, Watkins Glen International
- Course: Permanent racing facility
- Course length: 2.454 miles (3.949 km)
- Distance: 90 laps, 220.5 mi (354.86 km)
- Scheduled distance: 90 laps, 220.5 mi (354.86 km)
- Average speed: 89.081 miles per hour (143.362 km/h)

Pole position
Driver	Dale Jarrett	Robert Yates Racing
- Time: 1:11.884

Most laps led
Driver	Jeff Burton	Roush Racing
- Laps: 30

Winner
No. 24	Jeff Gordon	Hendrick Motorsports

Television in the United States
- Network: NBC
- Announcers: Allen Bestwick, Benny Parsons, Wally Dallenbach Jr.

Radio in the United States
- Radio: Motor Racing Network

The 2001 Global Crossing at the Glen was the 22nd stock car race of the 2001 NASCAR Winston Cup Series and the 16th iteration of the event. The race was held on Sunday, August 12, 2001, at the shortened layout of Watkins Glen International, a 2.454 miles (3.949 km) permanent road course layout. The race took the scheduled 90 laps to complete. For the final two restarts, Hendrick Motorsports, driver Jeff Gordon would fend off against eventual second-place finisher, Roush Racing driver Jeff Burton to win a close race. The win was Gordon's 57th career victory and his fifth of the season. To fill out the podium, Jeremy Mayfield, driving for Penske Racing South, would finish third.

== Background ==
The layout of Watkins Glen International NASCAR uses.

Watkins Glen International (nicknamed "The Glen") is an automobile race track located in Watkins Glen, New York at the southern tip of Seneca Lake. It was long known around the world as the home of the Formula One United States Grand Prix, which it hosted for twenty consecutive years (1961–1980), but the site has been home to road racing of nearly every class, including the World Sportscar Championship, Trans-Am, Can-Am, NASCAR Sprint Cup Series, the International Motor Sports Association and the IndyCar Series.

Initially, public roads in the village were used for the race course. In 1956 a permanent circuit for the race was built. In 1968 the race was extended to six hours, becoming the 6 Hours of Watkins Glen. The circuit's current layout has more or less been the same since 1971, although a chicane was installed at the uphill Esses in 1975 to slow cars through these corners, where there was a fatality during practice at the 1973 United States Grand Prix. The chicane was removed in 1985, but another chicane called the "Inner Loop" was installed in 1992 after J.D. McDuffie's fatal accident during the previous year's NASCAR Winston Cup event.

The circuit is known as the Mecca of North American road racing and is a very popular venue among fans and drivers. The facility is currently owned by International Speedway Corporation.

=== Entry list ===
- (R) denotes rookie driver.

#	Driver	Team	Make
1	Steve Park	Dale Earnhardt, Inc.	Chevrolet
01	Scott Pruett	Chip Ganassi Racing with Felix Sabates	Dodge
2	Rusty Wallace	Penske Racing South	Ford
4	Kevin Lepage	Morgan–McClure Motorsports	Chevrolet
5	Terry Labonte	Hendrick Motorsports	Chevrolet
6	Mark Martin	Roush Racing	Ford
7	Mike Wallace	Ultra Motorsports	Ford
8	Dale Earnhardt Jr.	Dale Earnhardt, Inc.	Chevrolet
9	Bill Elliott	Evernham Motorsports	Dodge
10	Johnny Benson Jr.	MBV Motorsports	Pontiac
11	Brett Bodine	Brett Bodine Racing	Ford
12	Jeremy Mayfield	Penske Racing South	Ford
14	Ron Hornaday Jr. (R)	A. J. Foyt Enterprises	Pontiac
15	Michael Waltrip	Dale Earnhardt, Inc.	Chevrolet
17	Matt Kenseth	Roush Racing	Ford
18	Bobby Labonte	Joe Gibbs Racing	Pontiac
19	Casey Atwood (R)	Evernham Motorsports	Dodge
20	Tony Stewart	Joe Gibbs Racing	Pontiac
21	Elliott Sadler	Wood Brothers Racing	Ford
22	Ward Burton	Bill Davis Racing	Dodge
24	Jeff Gordon	Hendrick Motorsports	Chevrolet
25	Jerry Nadeau	Hendrick Motorsports	Chevrolet
26	Jimmy Spencer	Haas-Carter Motorsports	Ford
27	Rick Mast	Eel River Racing	Pontiac
28	Ricky Rudd	Robert Yates Racing	Ford
29	Kevin Harvick (R)	Richard Childress Racing	Chevrolet
31	Robby Gordon	Richard Childress Racing	Chevrolet
32	Ricky Craven	PPI Motorsports	Ford
33	Joe Nemechek	Andy Petree Racing	Chevrolet
36	Ken Schrader	MBV Motorsports	Pontiac
40	Sterling Marlin	Chip Ganassi Racing with Felix Sabates	Dodge
43	John Andretti	Petty Enterprises	Dodge
44	Wally Dallenbach Jr.	Petty Enterprises	Dodge
45	Kyle Petty	Petty Enterprises	Dodge
55	Bobby Hamilton	Andy Petree Racing	Chevrolet
66	Todd Bodine	Haas-Carter Motorsports	Ford
68	Anthony Lazzaro	TWC Motorsports	Chevrolet
77	Boris Said	Jasper Motorsports	Ford
87	Ron Fellows	NEMCO Motorsports	Chevrolet
88	Dale Jarrett	Robert Yates Racing	Ford
90	Brian Simo	Donlavey Racing	Ford
92	Stacy Compton	Melling Racing	Dodge
93	Dave Blaney	Bill Davis Racing	Dodge
97	Kurt Busch (R)	Roush Racing	Ford
99	Jeff Burton	Roush Racing	Ford
Official entry list

== Practice ==
=== First practice ===
The first practice session was held on Friday, August 10, at 11:20 AM EST. The session would last for two hours. Ricky Rudd, driving for Robert Yates Racing, would set the fastest time in the session, with a lap of 1:11.714 and an average speed of 122.989 miles per hour (197.932 km/h).

Pos.	#	Driver	Team	Make	Time	Speed
1	28	Ricky Rudd	Robert Yates Racing	Ford	1:11.714	122.989
2	20	Tony Stewart	Joe Gibbs Racing	Pontiac	1:11.843	122.768
3	31	Robby Gordon	Richard Childress Racing	Chevrolet	1:11.959	122.570
Full first practice results

=== Second practice ===
The second practice session was held on Saturday, August 11, at 10:45 AM EST. The session would last for 45 minutes. Jeff Gordon, driving for Hendrick Motorsports, would set the fastest time in the session, with a lap of 1:12.859 and an average speed of 121.056 miles per hour (194.821 km/h).

Pos.	#	Driver	Team	Make	Time	Speed
1	24	Jeff Gordon	Hendrick Motorsports	Chevrolet	1:12.859	121.056
2	88	Dale Jarrett	Robert Yates Racing	Ford	1:12.939	120.923
3	87	Ron Fellows	NEMCO Motorsports	Chevrolet	1:12.948	120.908
Full second practice results

=== Third and final practice ===
The final practice session, sometimes referred to as Happy Hour, was held on Saturday, August 11, at 12:10 PM EST. The session would last for 50 minutes. Ron Fellows, driving for NEMCO Motorsports, would set the fastest time in the session, with a lap of 1:13.004 and an average speed of 120.815 miles per hour (194.433 km/h).

Pos.	#	Driver	Team	Make	Time	Speed
1	87	Ron Fellows	NEMCO Motorsports	Chevrolet	1:13.004	120.815
2	88	Dale Jarrett	Robert Yates Racing	Ford	1:13.144	120.584
3	31	Robby Gordon	Richard Childress Racing	Chevrolet	1:13.144	120.584
Full Happy Hour practice results

== Qualifying ==
Qualifying was held on Friday, August 10, at 3:05 PM EST. Each driver would have two laps to set a fastest time; the fastest of the two would count as their official qualifying lap. Positions 1-36 would be decided on time, while positions 37-43 would be based on provisionals. Six spots are awarded by the use of provisionals based on owner's points. The seventh is awarded to a past champion who has not otherwise qualified for the race. If no past champ needs the provisional, the next team in the owner points will be awarded a provisional.

Dale Jarrett, driving for Robert Yates Racing, would win the pole, setting a time of 1:11.884 and an average speed of 122.698 miles per hour (197.463 km/h).

Two drivers would fail to qualify: Mike Wallace and Wally Dallenbach Jr.

=== Full qualifying results ===
Pos.	#	Driver	Team	Make	Time	Speed
1	88	Dale Jarrett	Robert Yates Racing	Ford	1:11.884	122.698
2	28	Ricky Rudd	Robert Yates Racing	Ford	1:12.117	122.301
3	25	Jerry Nadeau	Hendrick Motorsports	Chevrolet	1:12.156	122.235
4	31	Robby Gordon	Richard Childress Racing	Chevrolet	1:12.166	122.218
5	2	Rusty Wallace	Penske Racing South	Ford	1:12.270	122.042
6	87	Ron Fellows	NEMCO Motorsports	Chevrolet	1:12.321	121.956
7	66	Todd Bodine	Haas-Carter Motorsports	Ford	1:12.378	121.860
8	01	Scott Pruett	Chip Ganassi Racing with Felix Sabates	Dodge	1:12.419	121.791
9	43	John Andretti	Petty Enterprises	Dodge	1:12.444	121.749
10	29	Kevin Harvick (R)	Richard Childress Racing	Chevrolet	1:12.460	121.722
11	20	Tony Stewart	Joe Gibbs Racing	Pontiac	1:12.488	121.675
12	22	Ward Burton	Bill Davis Racing	Dodge	1:12.579	121.523
13	24	Jeff Gordon	Hendrick Motorsports	Chevrolet	1:12.594	121.498
14	18	Bobby Labonte	Joe Gibbs Racing	Pontiac	1:12.758	121.224
15	6	Mark Martin	Roush Racing	Ford	1:12.908	120.974
16	40	Sterling Marlin	Chip Ganassi Racing with Felix Sabates	Dodge	1:12.938	120.924
17	14	Ron Hornaday Jr. (R)	A. J. Foyt Enterprises	Pontiac	1:12.938	120.924
18	45	Kyle Petty	Petty Enterprises	Dodge	1:12.965	120.880
19	33	Joe Nemechek	Andy Petree Racing	Chevrolet	1:12.971	120.870
20	77	Boris Said	Jasper Motorsports	Ford	1:12.994	120.832
21	9	Bill Elliott	Evernham Motorsports	Dodge	1:13.123	120.619
22	99	Jeff Burton	Roush Racing	Ford	1:13.171	120.540
23	15	Michael Waltrip	Dale Earnhardt, Inc.	Chevrolet	1:13.202	120.489
24	21	Elliott Sadler	Wood Brothers Racing	Ford	1:13.250	120.410
25	26	Jimmy Spencer	Haas-Carter Motorsports	Ford	1:13.262	120.390
26	10	Johnny Benson Jr.	MBV Motorsports	Pontiac	1:13.289	120.345
27	8	Dale Earnhardt Jr.	Dale Earnhardt, Inc.	Chevrolet	1:13.310	120.311
28	97	Kurt Busch (R)	Roush Racing	Ford	1:13.366	120.219
29	11	Brett Bodine	Brett Bodine Racing	Ford	1:13.500	120.000
30	55	Bobby Hamilton	Andy Petree Racing	Chevrolet	1:13.577	119.874
31	68	Anthony Lazzaro	TWC Motorsports	Chevrolet	1:13.627	119.793
32	36	Ken Schrader	MB2 Motorsports	Pontiac	1:13.664	119.733
33	4	Kevin Lepage	Morgan–McClure Motorsports	Chevrolet	1:13.676	119.713
34	19	Casey Atwood (R)	Evernham Motorsports	Dodge	1:13.689	119.692
35	93	Dave Blaney	Bill Davis Racing	Dodge	1:13.708	119.661
36	5	Terry Labonte	Hendrick Motorsports	Chevrolet	1:13.725	119.634
Provisionals
37	1	Steve Park	Dale Earnhardt, Inc.	Chevrolet	-	-
38	17	Matt Kenseth	Roush Racing	Ford	1:13.990	119.205
39	12	Jeremy Mayfield	Penske Racing South	Ford	1:14.112	119.009
40	32	Ricky Craven	PPI Motorsports	Ford	1:21.870	107.732
41	92	Stacy Compton	Melling Racing	Dodge	1:14.207	118.857
42	90	Brian Simo	Donlavey Racing	Ford	1:13.785	119.536
43	27	Rick Mast	Eel River Racing	Pontiac	1:14.354	118.622
Failed to qualify
44	7	Mike Wallace	Ultra Motorsports	Ford	1:13.836	119.454
45	44	Wally Dallenbach Jr.	Petty Enterprises	Dodge	1:14.104	119.022
Official qualifying results

== Race results ==
Fin	St	#	Driver	Team	Make	Laps	Led	Status	Pts	Winnings
1	13	24	Jeff Gordon	Hendrick Motorsports	Chevrolet	90	14	running	180	$173,402
2	22	99	Jeff Burton	Roush Racing	Ford	90	30	running	180	$125,371
3	39	12	Jeremy Mayfield	Penske Racing South	Ford	90	0	running	165	$97,834
4	2	28	Ricky Rudd	Robert Yates Racing	Ford	90	2	running	165	$96,322
5	7	66	Todd Bodine	Haas-Carter Motorsports	Ford	90	2	running	160	$57,350
6	3	25	Jerry Nadeau	Hendrick Motorsports	Chevrolet	90	0	running	150	$53,840
7	10	29	Kevin Harvick (R)	Richard Childress Racing	Chevrolet	90	0	running	146	$88,387
8	20	77	Boris Said	Jasper Motorsports	Ford	90	0	running	142	$59,645
9	14	18	Bobby Labonte	Joe Gibbs Racing	Pontiac	90	0	running	138	$88,532
10	37	1	Steve Park	Dale Earnhardt, Inc.	Chevrolet	90	0	running	134	$72,458
11	8	01	Scott Pruett	Chip Ganassi Racing with Felix Sabates	Dodge	90	3	running	135	$57,025
12	27	8	Dale Earnhardt Jr.	Dale Earnhardt, Inc.	Chevrolet	90	0	running	127	$69,788
13	29	11	Brett Bodine	Brett Bodine Racing	Ford	90	0	running	124	$44,736
14	9	43	John Andretti	Petty Enterprises	Dodge	90	0	running	121	$73,187
15	15	6	Mark Martin	Roush Racing	Ford	90	0	running	118	$81,596
16	26	10	Johnny Benson Jr.	MBV Motorsports	Pontiac	90	0	running	115	$45,700
17	17	14	Ron Hornaday Jr. (R)	A. J. Foyt Enterprises	Pontiac	90	0	running	112	$37,455
18	23	15	Michael Waltrip	Dale Earnhardt, Inc.	Chevrolet	90	0	running	109	$43,710
19	32	36	Ken Schrader	MB2 Motorsports	Pontiac	90	0	running	106	$49,620
20	41	92	Stacy Compton	Melling Racing	Dodge	90	1	running	108	$43,785
21	36	5	Terry Labonte	Hendrick Motorsports	Chevrolet	90	0	running	100	$69,310
22	34	19	Casey Atwood (R)	Evernham Motorsports	Dodge	90	0	running	97	$36,850
23	38	17	Matt Kenseth	Roush Racing	Ford	90	1	running	99	$44,120
24	21	9	Bill Elliott	Evernham Motorsports	Dodge	90	0	running	91	$60,673
25	16	40	Sterling Marlin	Chip Ganassi Racing with Felix Sabates	Dodge	90	0	running	88	$44,805
26	11	20	Tony Stewart	Joe Gibbs Racing	Pontiac	90	0	running	85	$53,035
27	43	27	Rick Mast	Eel River Racing	Pontiac	90	0	running	82	$35,215
28	35	93	Dave Blaney	Bill Davis Racing	Dodge	90	0	running	79	$32,645
29	28	97	Kurt Busch (R)	Roush Racing	Ford	90	0	running	76	$40,575
30	24	21	Elliott Sadler	Wood Brothers Racing	Ford	89	0	running	73	$50,505
31	1	88	Dale Jarrett	Robert Yates Racing	Ford	89	17	running	75	$82,962
32	19	33	Joe Nemechek	Andy Petree Racing	Chevrolet	88	0	crash	67	$60,630
33	33	4	Kevin Lepage	Morgan–McClure Motorsports	Chevrolet	88	0	running	64	$32,300
34	31	68	Anthony Lazzaro	TWC Motorsports	Chevrolet	88	0	running	61	$32,265
35	40	32	Ricky Craven	PPI Motorsports	Ford	88	4	running	63	$32,230
36	30	55	Bobby Hamilton	Andy Petree Racing	Chevrolet	87	0	running	55	$40,170
37	42	90	Brian Simo	Donlavey Racing	Ford	83	0	crash	52	$32,085
38	25	26	Jimmy Spencer	Haas-Carter Motorsports	Ford	76	0	engine	49	$40,025
39	18	45	Kyle Petty	Petty Enterprises	Dodge	59	0	handling	46	$31,990
40	4	31	Robby Gordon	Richard Childress Racing	Chevrolet	58	13	electrical	48	$64,254
41	12	22	Ward Burton	Bill Davis Racing	Dodge	48	0	engine	40	$65,030
42	6	87	Ron Fellows	NEMCO Motorsports	Chevrolet	36	3	axle	42	$31,860
43	5	2	Rusty Wallace	Penske Racing South	Ford	14	0	engine	34	$76,969
Official race results

Previous race: 2001 Brickyard 400	NASCAR Winston Cup Series; 2001 season	Next race: 2001 Pepsi 400 Presented by Meijer
