= 2003 Food City 500 =

Race details
- Race 6 of 36 in the 2003 NASCAR Winston Cup Series
- Map of the Bristol Motor Speedway
- Date: March 23, 2003
- Location: Bristol Motor Speedway, Bristol, Tennessee
- Course: Permanent racing facility
- Course length: 0.533 miles (0.858 km)
- Distance: 500 laps, 266.5 mi (428.89 km)
- Weather: Temperatures up to 62.6 °F (17.0 °C); wind speeds up to 1.96 miles per hour (3.15 km/h)
- Average speed: 76.185 miles per hour (122.608 km/h)

Pole position
Driver	Ryan Newman	Penske Racing
- Time: 14.908

Most laps led
Driver	Jeff Gordon	Hendrick Motorsports
- Laps: 174

Winner
No. 97	Kurt Busch	Roush Racing

Television in the United States
- Network: Fox Broadcasting Company
- Announcers: Mike Joy, Darrell Waltrip, Larry McReynolds
- Nielsen ratings: 5.1/11 (Final); 5.2/10 (Overnight)

The 2003 Food City 500 was the sixth stock car race of the 2003 NASCAR Winston Cup Series. It was held on March 23, 2003, before a crowd of approximately 160,000, in Bristol, Tennessee, at Bristol Motor Speedway, a short tracks that holds NASCAR races. The 500-lap race was won by Kurt Busch of the Roush Racing team after starting from 9th position. Matt Kenseth of Roush Racing finished 2nd and Joe Gibbs Racing's Bobby Labonte finished 3rd.

Entering the event, Kenseth led the Drivers' Championship by 57 points over Tony Stewart in second position. Although Ryan Newman won the pole position with the fastest recorded lap time in qualifying, he was immediately passed by Jeff Gordon at the start of the race. Twenty-eight laps later Rusty Wallace became the leader of the race. Gordon reclaimed the lead on lap 34 and led the most laps with 174. Jimmy Spencer passed Gordon for the lead on lap 161, and kept the position for a total of 139 laps. After the final pit stops, Busch became the leader of the race and maintained the position to lead a total of 116 laps, and to win his first race of the season. There were seventeen cautions and eleven lead changes among seven different drivers during the course of the race.

The race victory was Busch's first win in the 2003 season and the fifth of his career. The result advanced Busch from joint 5th with Ricky Craven to second in the Drivers' Championship, 138 points behind Kenseth, and nine ahead of Stewart, who fell to 3rd. Ford maintained its lead in the Manufacturers' Championship, eight ahead of Chevrolet, and eighteen ahead of Pontiac, who demoted Dodge to 4th place, with thirty races of the season remaining.

== Background ==
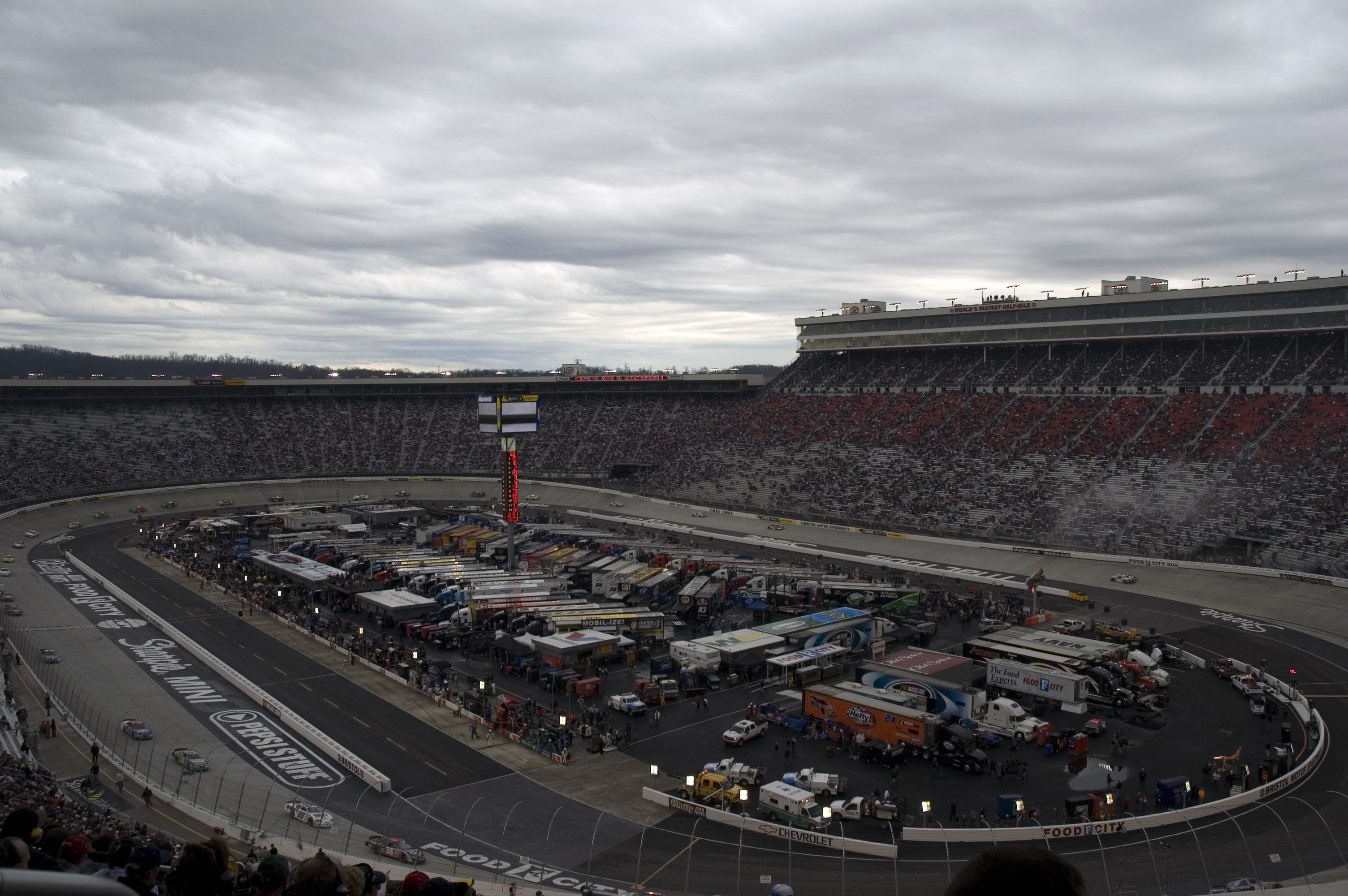
Bristol Motor Speedway, where the race was held.

The Food City 500 was the sixth scheduled stock car race of the 2003 NASCAR Winston Cup Series, out of 36, and the 2000th in Winston Cup Series history. It was held on March 23, 2003, in Bristol, Tennessee, at Bristol Motor Speedway, a short track that holds NASCAR races. The standard track at Bristol Motor Speedway is a four-turn short track oval that is 0.533 miles (0.858 km) long. The track's turns are banked from twenty-four to thirty degrees, while both the front stretch (the location of the finish line) and the back stretch are banked from six to ten degrees.

Before the race, Matt Kenseth led the Drivers' Championship with 760 points, with Tony Stewart in second place with 703 points. Michael Waltrip and Dale Earnhardt Jr. were third and fourth with 698 and 634 points respectively, with Kurt Busch and Ricky Craven were tied for fifth place with 617 points. Dave Blaney, Jimmie Johnson, Joe Nemechek and Johnny Benson Jr. rounded out the top ten. In the Manufacturers' Championship, Ford was leading with 36 points, five points ahead of their rivals Chevrolet. Pontiac, with 24 points, was five points ahead of Dodge in the battle for third place. Busch was the race's defending champion.

Ahead of the event, Speedway Motorsports unveiled an extended backstretch grandstand which added 43,826 to the track's capacity. Spectators at the track also planned a "patriotic rally" which showed support to troops serving in the Iraq War. This caused Speedway Motorsports to employ extra security during the event. NASCAR subsequently announced that a contingency plan was being prepared that included arrangements for travel and extra security for the next three races in the season. The United States Government gave its consent to NASCAR and the other professional sporting associations to resume with their normal schedules.

== Practice and qualifying ==
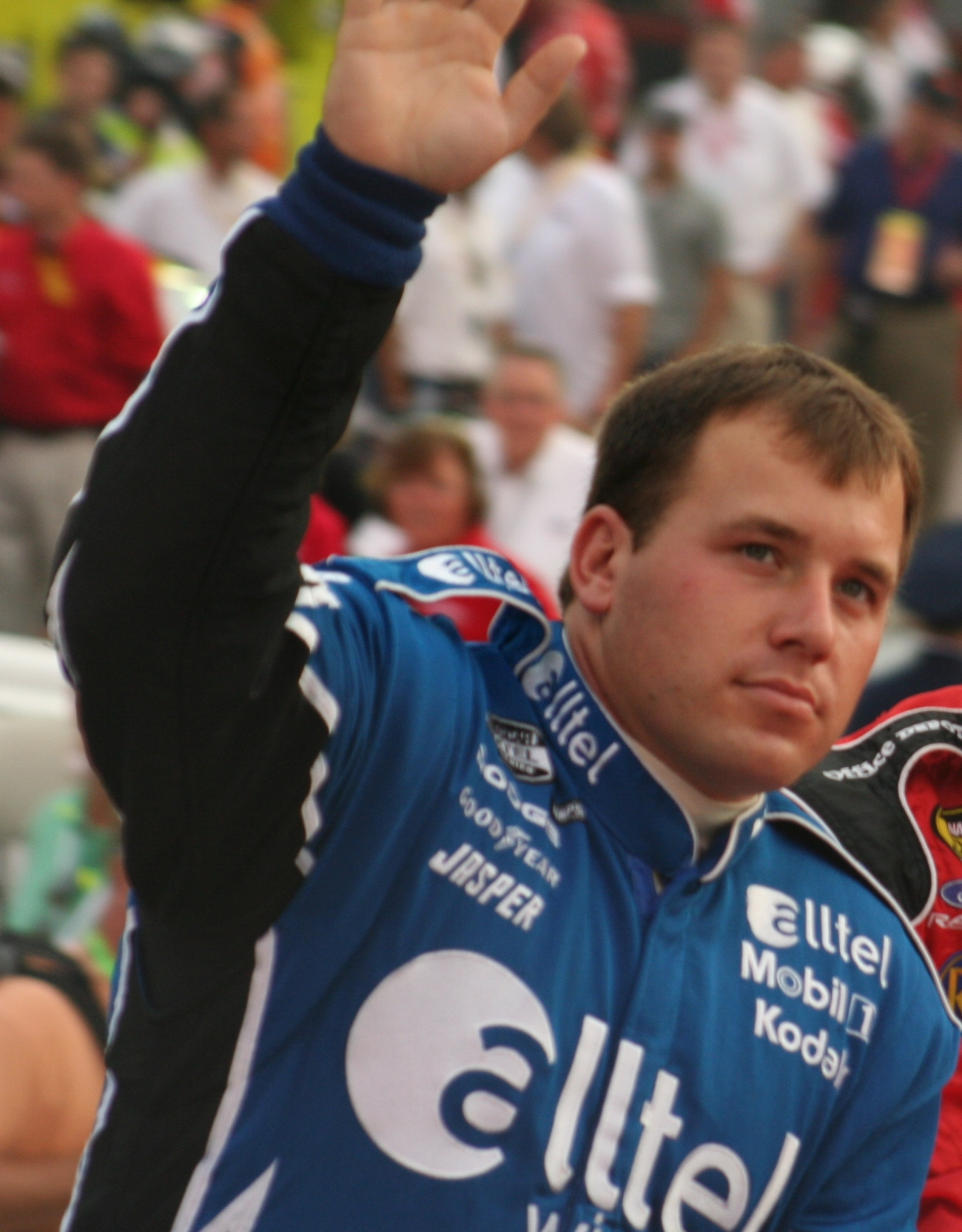
Ryan Newman won the ninth pole position of his career with the fastest time, 14.908 seconds.

Three practice sessions were held before the Sunday race—one on Friday and two on Saturday. The first session lasted 120 minutes, while the second and final sessions ran for 45 minutes. Jeff Gordon was fastest in the first practice session with a time of 15.149 seconds, ahead of Sterling Marlin in second and Ryan Newman in third. Ken Schrader (with a lap of 15.178) was fourth fastest, and Mike Skinner placed fifth. Busch, Kenny Wallace, Earnhardt, Jimmy Spencer and Nemechek rounded out the session's top-ten drivers. During the session, Jeff Green and Jamie McMurray both made contact with the wall, and both were required to switch to back-up cars for qualifying. Robby Gordon also hit the wall, after spinning sideways.

A total of forty-five drivers were entered in the qualifier on Friday afternoon; according to NASCAR's qualifying procedure, forty-three were allowed to race. Each driver ran two timed laps to determine pole position to 36th. The remainder of the field qualified through the use of provisionals. Ryan Newman clinched the second pole position of his season, and the ninth of his career, with a time of 14.908 seconds. The time beat Jeff Gordon's March 2002 track record, and it became the first sub-15 second lap in the Winston Cup Series. He was joined on the grid's front row by Jeff Gordon who was 0.160 seconds slower than Newman and held pole position until Newman's lap. Schrader qualified third in the highest qualifying position for his team BAM Racing. Rusty Wallace took fourth, and Bill Elliott started fifth. Skinner, Spencer, Earnhardt, Busch and Stewart completed the top ten starters. Positions two through twenty-four were covered by almost two-tenths of a second. Kenseth, Dale Jarrett, Casey Mears, Kenny Wallace, Todd Bodine, Jack Sprague and John Andretti used provisionals to qualify for the event. The two drivers who failed to qualify for the race were Larry Foyt for the second time in the 2003 season and Hermie Sadler. After the qualifier Newman said, "That's the most amazed I've ever been after a qualifying run to go that fast and not anticipate it. We picked up over a quarter of a second from practice, and that's just unheard of at Bristol."

On Saturday morning, Kenseth was fastest in the second practice session with a lap of 15.683 seconds, ahead of Newman in second and Ward Burton in third. Busch was fourth quickest, and Rusty Wallace took fifth. Jeff Burton managed sixth. Kyle Petty, Mark Martin, Sprague and Nemechek followed in the top ten. During the final practice session, Busch was fastest with a time of 15.701. Stewart and Jeff Gordon followed in second and third with times of 15.722 and 15.723. Dave Blaney was fourth fastest, ahead of Earnhardt and Craven. Kenseth was seventh fastest, Martin eighth, Jerry Nadeau ninth, and Ward Burton tenth. The session was temporarily suspended when Marlin spun on the track, but managed not to collide with the barriers.

=== Qualifying results ===
Grid	No	Driver	Team	Manufacturer	Time	Speed
1	12	Ryan Newman	Penske Racing	Dodge	14.908	128.709
2	24	Jeff Gordon	Hendrick Motorsports	Chevrolet	15.068	127.343
3	49	Ken Schrader	BAM Racing	Dodge	15.094	127.123
4	2	Rusty Wallace	Penske Racing	Dodge	15.106	127.022
5	9	Bill Elliott	Evernham Motorsport	Dodge	15.108	127.006
6	4	Mike Skinner	Morgan–McClure Motorsports	Pontiac	15.135	126.779
7	7	Jimmy Spencer	Ultra Motorsports	Dodge	15.158	126.587
8	8	Dale Earnhardt Jr.	Dale Earnhardt, Inc.	Chevrolet	15.160	126.570
9	97	Kurt Busch	Roush Racing	Ford	15.161	126.562
10	20	Tony Stewart	Joe Gibbs Racing	Chevrolet	15.175	126.445
11	22	Ward Burton	Bill Davis Racing	Dodge	15.181	126.395
12	18	Bobby Labonte	Joe Gibbs Racing	Chevrolet	15.188	126.337
13	01	Jerry Nadeau	MB2 Motorsports	Pontiac	15.200	126.237
14	32	Ricky Craven	PPI Motorsports	Pontiac	15.226	126.021
15	16	Greg Biffle	Roush Racing	Ford	15.228	126.005
16	40	Sterling Marlin	Chip Ganassi Racing	Dodge	15.234	125.955
17	5	Terry Labonte	Hendrick Motorsports	Chevrolet	15.237	125.930
18	19	Jeremy Mayfield	Evernham Motorsports	Dodge	15.240	125.906
19	6	Mark Martin	Roush Racing	Ford	15.251	125.815
20	10	Johnny Benson Jr.	MB2 Motorsports	Pontiac	15.254	125.790
21	30	Jeff Green	Dale Earnhardt, Inc.	Chevrolet	15.254	125.790
22	74	Tony Raines	BACE Motorsports	Chevrolet	15.260	125.741
23	48	Jimmie Johnson	Hendrick Motorsports	Chevrolet	15.262	125.724
24	37	Derrike Cope	Quest Motor Racing	Chevrolet	15.265	125.699
25	25	Joe Nemechek	Hendrick Motorsports	Chevrolet	15.270	125.658
26	42	Jamie McMurray	Chip Ganassi Racing	Dodge	15.283	125.551^{1}
27	29	Kevin Harvick	Richard Childress Racing	Chevrolet	15.289	125.502
28	15	Michael Waltrip	Dale Earnhardt, Inc.	Chevrolet	15.297	125.436
29	99	Jeff Burton	Roush Racing	Ford	15.303	125.387
30	38	Elliott Sadler	Robert Yates Racing	Ford	15.304	125.379
31	77	Dave Blaney	Jasper Motorsports	Ford	15.314	125.297
32	45	Kyle Petty	Petty Enterprises	Dodge	15.317	125.273
33	11	Brett Bodine	Brett Bodine Racing	Ford	15.317	125.573
34	21	Ricky Rudd	Wood Brothers Racing	Ford	15.341	125.077
35	1	Steve Park	Dale Earnhardt, Inc.	Chevrolet	15.348	125.020
36	31	Robby Gordon	Richard Childress Racing	Chevrolet	15.354	124.971
Provisional
37	17	Matt Kenseth	Roush Racing	Ford	15.447	124.218
38	88	Dale Jarrett	Robert Yates Racing	Ford	15.435	124.315
39	41	Casey Mears	Chip Ganassi Racing	Dodge	15.418	124.452
40	23	Kenny Wallace	Bill Davis Racing	Dodge	15.383	124.735
41	54	Todd Bodine	BelCar Racing	Ford	15.514	123.682
42	0	Jack Sprague	Haas CNC Racing	Pontiac	15.600	123.000
43	43	John Andretti	Petty Enterprises	Dodge	15.448	124.210
Failed to qualify
44	14	Larry Foyt	A. J. Foyt Enterprises	Ford	15.598	123.016
45	02	Hermie Sadler	SCORE Motorsports	Pontiac	15.481	123.946
^{1} Moved to the back of the field for changing engines

== Race ==
The race began at 1:00pm EST and was televised live in the United States on Fox. Commentary was provided by Mike Joy, Larry McReynolds, and Darrell Waltrip. At the start of the race, weather conditions were sunny and warm. Reverend Mike Rife, of the Vansant Church of Christ in Vansant, Virginia, began pre-race ceremonies with an invocation. Country music singer Rebecca Lynn Howard performed the national anthem, and representatives of the United States Armed Forces commanded the drivers to start their engines. During the pace laps, McMurray had to move to the rear of the grid because of him changing his engine.

Jeff Gordon accelerated faster than Newman off the line, getting ahead of him by the first turn. Rusty Wallace passed Newman for the second position one lap later. On the third lap, the first caution was given when Robby Gordon made contact with Petty, forcing him to spin sideways. Robby Gordon was cautioned for the collision. Kenny Wallace also made contact with Ricky Rudd, but escaped with minor damage. None of the drivers made pit stops during the caution. Jeff Gordon led the field back up to speed at the restart on lap seven. Jeremy Mayfield made contact with the wall leaving the second turn at around the tenth lap, and suffered a flat front right tire. No caution was given. Four laps later, Michael Waltrip experienced oversteer and collided with Dave Blaney. Jarrett had no room to negotiate through and struck the rear of Waltrip's car. The incident prompted the race's second caution. Waltrip's car suffered heavy damage to the rear end of his car.

Almost immediately after the lap 20 restart, Andretti collided with the slowing Bodine, who in turn, struck Petty. Mears had no space to pass by and struck Andretti. The accident caused the event's third caution. Andretti's car sustained major damage to the front end. The race restarted on lap 29, with Rusty Wallace claiming the lead. One lap later, Busch and Stewart passed Schrader for seventh and eighth respectively. Earnhardt moved into third after passing Skinner on lap 33. One lap later, Jeff Gordon reclaimed the first position. On the 42nd lap, Earnhardt passed Rusty Wallace for second. Thirteen laps later, Tony Raines stopped on track due to an engine failure, and the fourth caution was given as a result. All of the leaders elected to make pit stops during the caution. Jeff Gordon maintained his lead at the restart on the 64th lap, followed by Terry Labonte and Green.

Stewart made contact with Newman, who went up the circuit. Newman then came town the track and crashed into the side of Craven, who went into Bodine, which prompted the fifth caution on lap 68. Behind the trio, Steve Park hit the rear of Johnson, causing the latter to spin sideways. Most drivers stayed on track during the caution, allowing Jeff Gordon to remain the leader on the restart. Skinner fell to eighth after being passed by Busch and Earnhardt on the 75th lap. It was around this lap that Kenseth had advanced to fourth place. Five laps later, Earnhardt passed Busch to claim sixth. On lap 85, Skinner fell from eighth to twelfth position. Kenseth, who started the race in thirty-seventh, had moved up thirty-four positions to third by lap 91. By the 111th lap, Jeff Gordon had maintained a half second lead over Terry Labonte. Thirteen laps later, Spencer and Stewart passed Kenseth for fourth and fifth respectively.

The pace car came out for the sixth caution on lap 136, after Skinner collided with the turn two outside wall due to a failed right-front tire and his car caught fire. During the caution, all of the leaders elected to make pit stops. Jeff Gordon led on the restart, followed by Nemechek and Spencer. On the 149th lap, the seventh caution came out, after Sprague spun 180 degrees when he attempted to pass Benson on the inside and the two made contact. Jeff Gordon led on the lap 154-restart, although he was passed by Skinner on lap 161. After starting the race in twenty-eighth, Kevin Harvick moved to sixth position by lap 169. Twelve laps later, Sprague spun sideways in the fourth turn and crashed against the inside barrier on the front stretch, prompting the eighth caution. Sprague was able to continue driving. During the caution, some of the leaders chose to make pit stops. Jeff Gordon led on the restart on the 187th lap.

On the 198th lap, Jeff Burton made contact with Earnhardt, collecting Johnson, with all three cars escaping with minor damage. The ninth caution was prompted on the next lap, after Martin was sent spinning sideways from contact with Bill Elliott. Mears spun sideways before the caution was given. During the caution, some of the leaders elected to make pit stops. Harvick was the leader at the restart, followed by Spencer and Terry Labonte. Robby Gordon collided with the wall on lap 210, damaging his car and fell to twelfth position. Four laps later, Sadler passed Marlin for eighth. Spencer passed Harvick to reclaim the lead on the 217th lap. Nadeau was sent into the turn one inside barrier when he spun sideways from making contact with Newman and being struck by Brett Bodine, prompting the tenth caution one lap later.

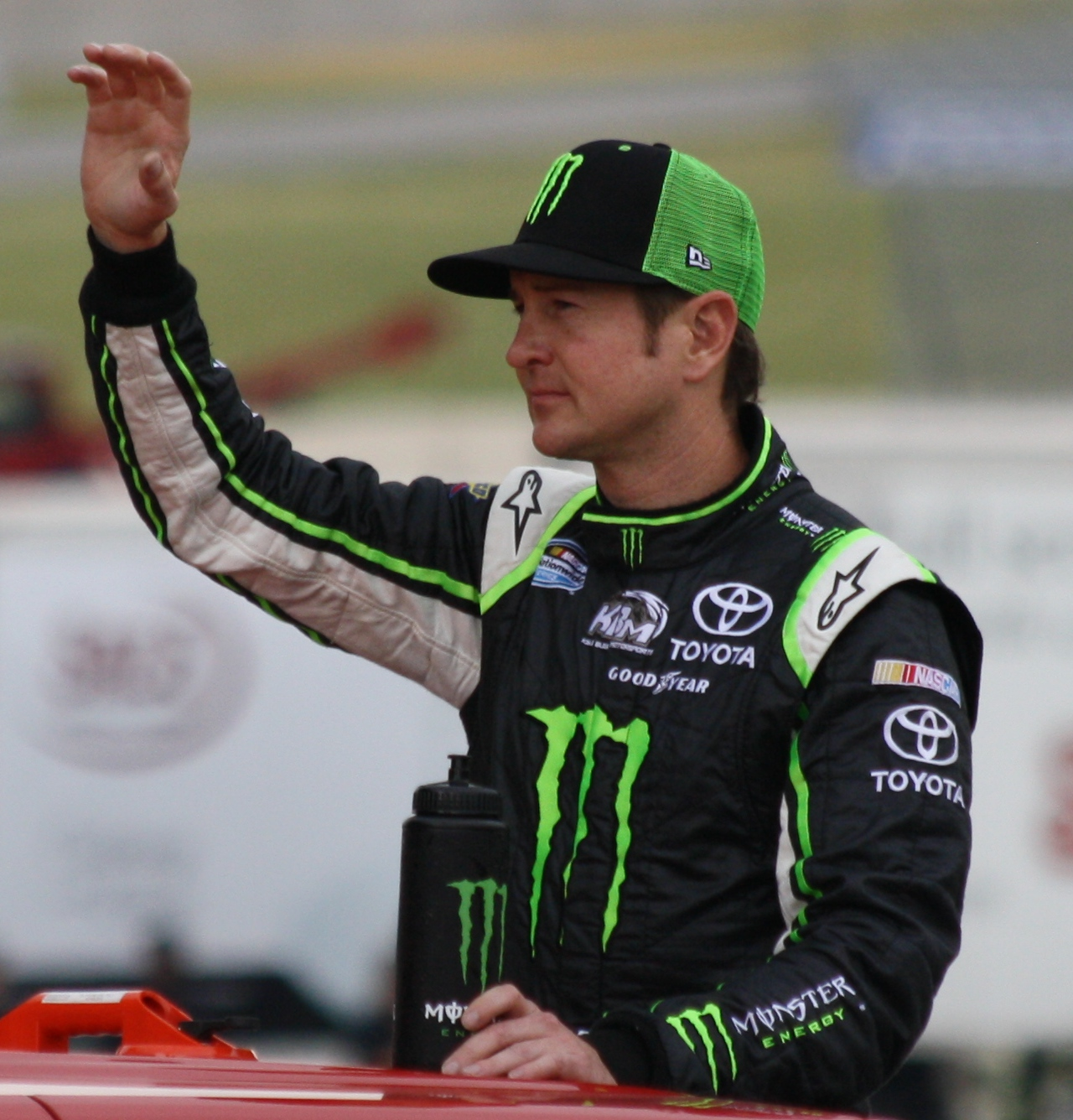
Kurt Busch won the race, after passing Bobby Labonte with ninety-five laps remaining.

Spencer maintained his lead at the lap 223 restart. Bobby Labonte slowed and was hit at the rear by his teammate Stewart, just as Kenseth went into the rear of his teammate Busch. Both Bobby Labonte and Busch spun, and these accidents triggered the eleventh caution on the 226th lap. Spencer led when the race restarted on lap 241. Two laps later, a multi-car collision occurred at turn two when Brett Bodine made contact with Terry Labonte, causing Labonte to spin, and collect Kenny Wallace, Robby Gordon, Petty, and Schrader; this would prompt the twelfth caution. Spencer remained the leader at the restart on lap 250. On lap 256, McMurray made contact with Robby Gordon, slowed and was hit by Ward Burton, spinning sideways and causing the thirteenth caution. Stewart also made contact with Rudd, while Bobby Labonte spun sideways and managed to not collide with the barriers. Rudd was pushed by Stewart during the caution, earning Joe Gibbs Racing a warning to calm Stewart down.

The race restarted on lap 263. On lap 265, Earnhardt lost two positions after being passed by Johnson, Jeff Gordon and Kenseth. Eighteen laps later, Kenseth passed Jeff Gordon for the fifth position. By the 300th lap, Kenseth passed Johnson for third. On lap 315, Busch moved into the fifth position by passing Jeff Gordon. Green flag pit stops began on lap 327 when Harvick made a pit stop. Competitors who had not made a pit stop beforehand would be required to do so under green flag conditions. Kenseth passed Spencer to claim the first position on the 334th lap. Spencer lost another position to Busch four laps later. On lap 348, Bobby Labonte moved into fifth position after passing Johnson. Eleven laps later, Busch passed Kenseth to claim the lead. On the 367th lap, Earnhardt began to run out of fuel and made a pit stop one lap later. Jeff Gordon entered the backstretch pit lane when his pit stall was on the frontstretch area during lap 371 and lost around two to three seconds worth of time.

Bobby Labonte claimed the first position off Busch seven laps later. On lap 390, the fourteenth caution was prompted, after one of Jarrett's tires went flat; he spun into the turn two inside barrier. Schrader spun before the caution came out and damaged the front of his car. Jarrett stopped at the pit road entrance on the backstretch in his unsuccessful attempt to exit the track. Pit road was closed until cleanup crews removed debris. At the time, just Bobby Labonte, Busch, Marlin, Rudd and Greg Biffle had not made a pit stop under green flag conditions and were expected to make them. Since speeds during caution laps were limited to 35 mph (56 km/h), the five lead teams would be able to make pit stops and avoid falling one or two laps behind than drivers who had made their pit stops under racing conditions. Jimmy Fennig, Busch's crew chief, requested over the radio to Busch that he make a pit stop two laps earlier. When he noticed debris on the track in the second turn due to a legacy of Jarrett's crash, Busch decided not to make a pit stop.

The race restarted on lap 404, with Busch overtaking Bobby Labonte for the lead. On lap 406, the fifteenth caution was given; Petty drove onto the apron and made contact with Nemechek, causing Petty to spin sideways. Busch remained the leader at the restart on the 412th lap, ahead of Bobby Labonte and Rudd. Kenseth passed Biffle for fifth on lap 420. Four laps later, the sixteenth caution was prompted, when Ward Burton made contact with Robby Gordon exiting turn four. Ward Burton struck the inside barrier on the frontstretch and went up the circuit. He made contact with Petty's car, sending Petty spinning 180 degrees backwards driver's-side and struck the turn one outside barrier driver's side. Petty remained in his car until he was extricated by rescue workers. Busch led the field back up to speed on the lap 439 restart. On the 456th lap, Kenseth passed Rudd to claim third position. Nine laps later, Biffle passed Rudd for fourth position. Martin was spun in front of the race leaders on lap 470, but managed to continue.

Two laps later, the pace car came out for the seventeenth and final caution; as competitors ahead of him slowed, Nemechek made rear-end contact with Stewart, (who just before made contact with the slowing Andretti) because of reduced visibility caused by smoke from when Martin spun on track. Stewart sustained heavy damage to the front of his vehicle. Busch remained the leader at the lap 482 restart. Bobby Labonte was passed by Kenseth for second during the same lap. Kenseth damaged his car's right-front fender during the pass; it affected his car's handling until the metal on the fender became worn out. On the 488th lap, Rudd reclaimed fourth position from Biffle. Kenseth was unable to get close enough to effect an overtake on his teammate Busch, who achieved his first victory of the 2003 season, his second successive in the event, and the fifth of his career. Kenseth finished second, ahead of Bobby Labonte in third, Rudd in fourth, and Biffle a then-career best fifth. Only the first six finishers were on the same lap as Busch. There were seventeen cautions and eleven changes of lead among seven different drivers during the race. Jeff Gordon more often than any other driver with 174 laps led during three different periods. Busch led twice for a total of 116 laps.

=== Post-race ===
"I'm out here having fun, living a dream and driving cars for a living. I don't know what it is about me, I don't know what it is about Bristol. I love this place and I love that I got another win."

— Busch, speaking after the race.

Busch appeared in victory lane to celebrate his first win of the season in front of approximately 160,000 people who attended the race, earning $162,790 in race winnings. Afterward, Fennig praised his performance, "Kurt Busch is awesome, so awesome. He gets up on the wheel and drives the hell out of that race car, and he made a call today that won him the race." Kenseth was happy with his second-place finish, commenting, "I feel lucky. Started provisional here at Bristol and coming home second. So, it was a great race. Me and Bobby had to go there a little at the end, and I got my fender knocked in there a little. I was hoping I could make a run at Kurt before that happened. But, it was a good race. It's always physical out there, and we didn't have a scratch on the car there until right at the end, so it was pretty good."

Bobby Labonte was happy with finishing third, commenting, "I got spun out twice and finished third. "It's a great day. How much greater could you want it to get?" Spencer, who led 139 laps of the race, was candid about his performance, "It should have been a first, but the Sirius Dodge boys are doing a good job. I wouldn't trade 'em. We made some mistakes, but we'll get better." Mears, who was involved in the lap 20 collision with Andretti and Todd Bodine, commented, "I don't know what happened. I was just going through the gears taking my time and it looked like somebody up front may have missed a shift or somebody may have got into somebody else." Terry Labonte, who was part of the race's biggest crash when Bodine made contact with him on lap 243, said that, "Any time you're in a race with a Bodine, you're liable to get in a wreck, and I did." Rudd said his team possibly had a car that could have finished between positions four and six that was dependent on alterations and pit stops. Stewart remarked that he had "never been hit so much in one day" and called it "a bad day" for himself.

During the race, Jerry Nadeau and Ryan Newman were involved in a battle for position that resulted in the two colliding on the 219th lap. Once Nadeau returned to pit road, he was talking out of anger to Newman's team personnel about the incident. Once the argument ended, Nadeau commented, "It's a shame. It was a great car for us, the U.S. Army Pontiac. Damn lapped-car can't use his head. I don't know what Ryan (Newman) was thinking. He just kept coming down, kept coming down." Newman argued, "It looked to me like the 11 (Bodine) got into the back of the 01 (Nadeau) on that one deal." Kyle Petty, who was involved in the crash on lap 425, was taken to the circuit's infield medical center, and later taken for a precautionary visit at the Bristol Regional Medical Center to undergo medical evaluations. Petty's crash was measured at 80G, and he suffered injuries to his ribs and abdomen. Petty was released from hospital during the night; he was replaced by former CART driver Christian Fittipaldi for the next round, the Samsung/Radio Shack 500 at Texas Motor Speedway.

The race result left Kenseth leading the Drivers' Championship with 935 points. Busch, who finished first, moved to second on 797, nine points ahead of Stewart and eleven ahead of Waltrip. Earnhardt Jr. fell to fifth with 749 points. In the Manufacturers' Championship, Ford maintained the lead with 45 points. Chevrolet remained second on 37 points. Pontiac followed with 27 points, four points ahead of Dodge in fourth. Having increased his points lead, Kenseth said that he was happy and he would not change his driving style because of this change. He also added that his team would "have another six to eight months" before they would start to worry about their rivals making a challenge for the championship. The race took three hours, twenty-nine minutes and twenty-two seconds to complete, and the margin of victory was 0.390 seconds.

=== Race results ===
Pos	Car	Driver	Team	Manufacturer	Laps run	Points
1	97	Kurt Busch	Roush Racing	Ford	500	180^{1}
2	17	Matt Kenseth	Roush Racing	Ford	500	175^{1}
3	18	Bobby Labonte	Joe Gibbs Racing	Chevrolet	500	170^{1}
4	21	Ricky Rudd	Wood Brothers Racing	Ford	500	160
5	16	Greg Biffle	Roush Racing	Ford	500	155
6	40	Sterling Marlin	Chip Ganassi Racing	Dodge	500	150
7	29	Kevin Harvick	Richard Childress Racing	Chevrolet	499	151^{1}
8	48	Jimmie Johnson	Hendrick Motorsports	Chevrolet	499	142
9	24	Jeff Gordon	Hendrick Motorsports	Chevrolet	499	138^{2}
10	23	Kenny Wallace	Bill Davis Racing	Dodge	499	134
11	42	Jamie McMurray	Chip Ganassi Racing	Dodge	499	130
12	7	Jimmy Spencer	Ultra Motorsports	Dodge	498	132^{1}
13	99	Jeff Burton	Roush Racing	Ford	498	124
14	2	Rusty Wallace	Penske Racing	Dodge	498	126^{1}
15	32	Ricky Craven	PPI Motorsports	Pontiac	498	118
16	8	Dale Earnhardt Jr.	Dale Earnhardt, Inc.	Chevrolet	498	115
17	31	Robby Gordon	Richard Childress Racing	Chevrolet	498	112
18	9	Bill Elliott	Evernham Motorsport	Dodge	497	109
19	10	Johnny Benson Jr.	MB2 Motorsports	Pontiac	497	106
20	30	Jeff Green	Dale Earnhardt, Inc.	Chevrolet	497	103
21	38	Elliott Sadler	Robert Yates Racing	Ford	497	100
22	12	Ryan Newman	Penske Racing	Dodge	496	97
23	19	Jeremy Mayfield	Evernham Motorsports	Dodge	494	94
24	11	Brett Bodine	Brett Bodine Racing	Ford	494	91
25	15	Michael Waltrip	Dale Earnhardt, Inc.	Chevrolet	488	88
26	20	Tony Stewart	Joe Gibbs Racing	Chevrolet	487	85
27	25	Joe Nemechek	Hendrick Motorsports	Chevrolet	469	82
28	01	Jerry Nadeau	MB2 Motorsports	Pontiac	456	79
29	6	Mark Martin	Roush Racing	Ford	451	76
30	1	Steve Park	Dale Earnhardt, Inc.	Chevrolet	446	73
31	43	John Andretti	Petty Enterprises	Dodge	440	70
32	41	Casey Mears	Chip Ganassi Racing	Dodge	423	67
33	22	Ward Burton	Bill Davis Racing	Dodge	422	64
34	45	Kyle Petty	Petty Enterprises	Dodge	422	61
35	0	Jack Sprague	Haas CNC Racing	Pontiac	409	58
36	88	Dale Jarrett	Robert Yates Racing	Ford	397	55
37	49	Ken Schrader	BAM Racing	Dodge	385	52
38	77	Dave Blaney	Jasper Motorsports	Ford	371	49
39	5	Terry Labonte	Hendrick Motorsports	Chevrolet	349	46
40	54	Todd Bodine	BelCar Racing	Ford	342	43
41	4	Mike Skinner	Morgan–McClure Motorsports	Pontiac	310	40
42	74	Tony Raines	BACE Motorsports	Chevrolet	52	37
43	37	Derrike Cope	Quest Motor Racing	Chevrolet	31	34
^{1} Includes five bonus points for leading a lap^{2} Includes ten bonus points for leading the most laps

== Standings after the race ==
Drivers' Championship standings
	Pos	Driver	Points
	1	Matt Kenseth	935
3	2	Kurt Busch	797 (−138)
1	3	Tony Stewart	788 (−147)
1	4	Michael Waltrip	786 (−149)
1	5	Dale Earnhardt Jr.	749 (−186)
2	6	Jimmie Johnson	743 (−192)
1	7	Ricky Craven	735 (−200)
5	8	Bobby Labonte	732 (−203)
8	9	Ricky Rudd	695 (−240)
5	10	Jeff Gordon	694 (−241)

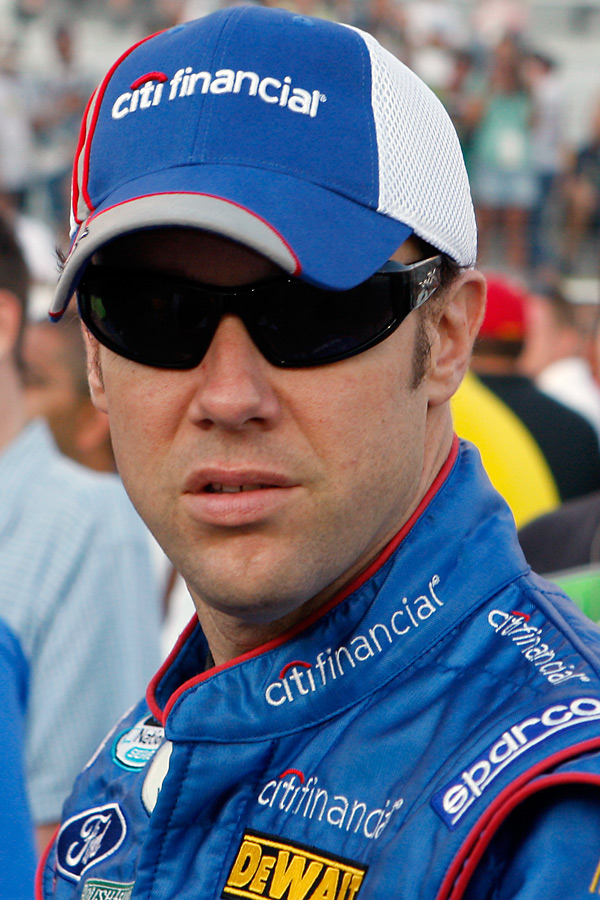
Matt Kenseth remained the points leader with 935 points, after finishing 2nd in the race.

Manufacturers' Championship standings
Pos	Manufacturer	Points
1	Ford	45
2	Chevrolet	37 (−8)
3	Pontiac	27 (−18)
4	Dodge	23 (−22)

Previous race: 2003 Carolina Dodge Dealers 400	Winston Cup Series; 2003 season	Next race: 2003 Samsung/Radio Shack 500
