= Jim Smith (racing businessman) =

American NASCAR team owner

Jim Smith is an American motocross racer and former NASCAR team owner who helped found the Craftsman Truck Series. Smith tested a prototype of the truck prior to the 1994 Daytona 500 at Daytona International Speedway.

Smith owned Ultra Motorsports until the closing of their shop in early 2006 following a sponsorship dispute with the Ford Motor Company. Ultra Motorsports fielded Dodges in the Craftsman Truck Series for Ted Musgrave and Jimmy Spencer, and was an investment partner with Robby Gordon Motorsports in the NEXTEL Cup Series. Smith won the 2005 NASCAR Craftsman truck series championship with Ted Musgrave driving. Ultra Motorsports won 36 races in the truck series.

Smith is also a two-time winner of the Baja 1000. He owns Ultra Wheel, Inc. in Fullerton, California.
