= Ultra Motorsports =

Former stock car racing team

- Owner: Jim and Marlene Smith
- Base: Charlotte, North Carolina
- Series: Winston Cup Series; Craftsman Truck Series
- Race drivers: Ted Musgrave, Kasey Kahne, Mike Bliss, Mike Wallace, Scott Riggs, Jimmy Spencer, Michael Waltrip
- Manufacturer: Ford, Dodge, Chevrolet
- Opened: 1994
- Closed: 2005

Career
- Drivers' Championships: 1
- Race victories: 36 (Craftsman Truck Series)

Ultra Motorsports was a NASCAR Winston Cup and Craftsman Truck Series racing team. Jim Smith helped start the team and the Craftsman Truck Series. It ran full-time in the Craftsman Truck Series from 1995 to 2005, earning 36 series wins and a championship in 2005 with Ted Musgrave. Early in 2006, Ultra announced that they would close up shop after a fallout with Ford.

== Winston Cup ==
Ultra Motorsports began running Winston Cup in 1994, when P. J. Jones drove the No. 06 Ford Thunderbird at Phoenix, finishing 29th, nine laps down. The next season, Butch Gilliland ran the No. 38 Ford at Sonoma, but finished 42nd after an early engine failure. Ultra returned to Cup in 1999 with the No. 32. Mike Wallace qualified at Richmond, finishing 24th.

Midway through 2000, Mattei Motorsports sold a partial interest in the team to Ultra and Smith, who bought out Mattei one month later. The team inherited the No. 7 Chevrolet Monte Carlo and its driver Michael Waltrip, and kept the team's sponsorship with construction equipment rental service NationsRent. Waltrip left the team after a 29th-place points finish.

In 2001, Ultra went back to fielding Fords and signed Mike Wallace to replace Waltrip. Wallace struggled and with the season entering its first road race at Sonoma, Ultra decided to go with a more experienced road course driver and hired Robby Gordon, who had been hired to replace Bobby Hamilton in the No. 4 Kodak car for Morgan-McClure Motorsports but was himself fired and replaced by Kevin Lepage early in the season, to drive the No. 7 on the road course. Gordon contended for the win most of the day, finally placing second and giving Ultra its best-ever finish. Wallace returned to the car afterward, but left the team to replace the fired Jeremy Mayfield at Penske Racing in October, and Lepage replaced him after leaving the No. 4 team.

For the 2002 season, Ultra underwent three significant changes. As the previous season was drawing to a close, Evernham Motorsports announced it had signed Jeremy Mayfield to drive for the team. Since Evernham's team, one of the charter teams in Dodge's return to NASCAR, already had two drivers under contract, this required some maneuvering to be done. Ultra and Evernham, therefore, struck an agreement. Mayfield would join Bill Elliott on Evernham's team and take over the No. 19 Dodge-sponsored car. The No. 19's incumbent driver, Casey Atwood, would then move over to Ultra and take over the No. 7. In return, Evernham and Ultra would enter into a partnership where Ultra would switch from Ford to Dodge and the team would become known as Ultra-Evernham Motorsports, with Sirius Satellite Radio coming on to sponsor the No. 7 and the team adopting Evernham's car numbering style.

The arrangement did not last the entire season. Atwood, who had finished third in the Rookie of the Year standings in 2001, struggled mightily in the No. 7, and Smith elected to release him with two races left in the season and promote Truck Series driver Jason Leffler to finish the season. Evernham responded by pulling their support from Ultra, and thus the team went back to simply being known as Ultra Motorsports.

Despite the troubles, Ultra remained with Dodge and Sirius for 2003. Leffler returned to the Truck Series and Smith hired Jimmy Spencer to pilot the No. 7. This was Spencer's third team in as many seasons; he had left the No. 26 Kmart-sponsored Ford Haas-Carter Motorsports to take over for Leffler at Chip Ganassi Racing at the end of 2001, only to be replaced by Casey Mears as driver of the No. 41 Target-sponsored Dodge after 2002. Despite being suspended for one race after an altercation with Kurt Busch, Spencer managed to improve the team's final positioning and finished 29th with four top ten finishes. Ultra even expanded to field a second car for Ted Musgrave in selected races, carrying Sirius sponsorship and No. 07. The team ran only two races in 2004 after struggling to find a sponsor.

In 2005, Robby Gordon purchased the team and named it Robby Gordon Motorsports.

=== Car No. 7 results ===
Year	Driver	No.	Make	1	2	3	4	5	6	7	8	9	10	11	12	13	14	15	16	17	18	19	20	21	22	23	24	25	26	27	28	29	30	31	32	33	34	35	36	Owners	Pts
1994	P. J. Jones	06	Ford	DAY	CAR	RCH	ATL	DAR	BRI	NWS	MAR	TAL	SON	CLT	DOV	POC	MCH	DAY	NHA	POC	TAL	IND	GLN	MCH	BRI	DAR	RCH	DOV	MAR	NWS	CLT	CAR	PHO; 29	ATL							
1995	Mike Bliss	08	Ford	DAY	CAR	RCH	ATL	DAR	BRI	NWS	MAR	TAL	SON	CLT	DOV	POC	MCH	DAY	NHA	POC	TAL	IND	GLN	MCH	BRI	DAR	RCH	DOV	MAR	NWS	CLT	CAR	PHO; DNQ	ATL							
1997	Mike Bliss	02	Ford	DAY	CAR	RCH	ATL	DAR	TEX; DNQ	BRI	MAR	SON	TAL	CLT	DOV	POC	MCH	CAL	DAY	NHA	POC	IND	GLN	MCH	BRI	DAR	RCH; DNQ	NHA	DOV	MAR	CLT	TAL	CAR	PHO	ATL					62nd	47
1999	Mike Wallace	32	Ford	DAY	CAR	LVS	ATL	DAR	TEX	BRI	MAR	TAL	CAL	RCH	CLT	DOV	MCH	POC	SON	DAY	NHA	POC	IND; DNQ	GLN	MCH	BRI	DAR	RCH; 24	NHA	DOV	MAR	CLT	TAL	CAR	PHO; DNQ	HOM	ATL			55th	129
2000	Michael Waltrip	7	Chevy	DAY	CAR	LVS	ATL	DAR	BRI	TEX	MAR	TAL	CAL	RCH	CLT	DOV	MCH; 22	POC; 43	SON; 12	DAY; 42	NHA; 35	POC; 17	IND; 20	GLN; 17	MCH; 21	BRI; 19	DAR; 40	RCH; 43	NHA; 20	DOV; 24	MAR; 24	CLT; 22	TAL; 34	CAR; 35	PHO; 32	HOM; 34	ATL; 39			30th	2797
2001	Mike Wallace	7	Ford	DAY; 6	CAR; 40	LVS; 32	ATL; 40	DAR; 32	BRI; 37	TEX; 24	MAR; 31	TAL; 9	CAL; 16	RCH; 25	CLT; DNQ	DOV; 28	MCH; DNQ			DAY; 10		NHA; 10	POC; 25	IND; DNQ	GLN; DNQ	MCH; 35	BRI; 31	DAR; 12	RCH; 42	DOV; 23	KAN; 19									32nd	3059
2001	Ted Musgrave	7	Ford															POC; 29																						32nd	3059
2001	Robby Gordon	7	Ford																SON; 2		CHI; 35																			32nd	3059
2001	Kevin Lepage	7	Ford																													CLT; 13	MAR; 21	TAL; 10	PHO; 32	CAR; 16	HOM; 29	ATL; 19	NHA; 35	32nd	3059
2002	Casey Atwood	7	Dodge	DAY; 35	CAR; 39	LVS; 41	ATL; 32	DAR; 26	BRI; 18	TEX; 35	MAR; 38	TAL; 26	CAL; 28	RCH; 22	CLT; 17	DOV; 14	POC; 11	MCH; 39	SON; 21	DAY; 20	CHI; 28	NHA; 36	POC; 28	IND; 38	GLN; 27	MCH; 42	BRI; 18	DAR; 28	RCH; 24	NHA; 34	DOV; 32	KAN; 42	TAL; 34	CLT; 30	MAR; 21	ATL; 38	CAR; 29			38th	2697
2002	Jason Leffler	7	Dodge																																			PHO; 31	HOM; 35	38th	2697
2003	Jimmy Spencer	7	Dodge	DAY; 40	CAR; 28	LVS; 17	ATL; 7	DAR; 21	BRI; 12	TEX; 33	TAL; 38	MAR; 19	CAL; 33	RCH; 42	CLT; 4	DOV; 29	POC; 39	MCH; 29	SON; 36	DAY; 12	CHI; 23	NHA; 15	POC; 22	IND; 8	GLN; 23	MCH; 26		DAR; 22	RCH; 36	NHA; 23	DOV; 15	TAL; 42	KAN; 15	CLT; 26	MAR; 38	ATL; 9	PHO; 40	CAR; 14	HOM; 25	28th	3217
2003	Ted Musgrave	7	Dodge																								BRI; 31													28th	3217
2004	Jimmy Spencer	7	Dodge	DAY; 24	CAR	LVS	ATL	DAR	BRI	TEX	MAR	TAL	CAL																											62nd	165
2004	Dave Blaney	7	Dodge											RCH; 40																										62nd	165
2004	Steve Park	7	Dodge												CLT; DNQ	DOV	POC	MCH	SON	DAY	CHI	NHA	POC	IND	GLN	MCH	BRI	CAL	RCH	NHA	DOV	TAL	KAN	CLT	MAR	ATL	PHO	DAR	HOM	62nd	165

=== Car No. 07 results ===
Year	Driver	No.	Make	1	2	3	4	5	6	7	8	9	10	11	12	13	14	15	16	17	18	19	20	21	22	23	24	25	26	27	28	29	30	31	32	33	34	35	36	Owners	Pts
2002	Ted Musgrave	07	Dodge	DAY	CAR	LVS	ATL	DAR	BRI	TEX	MAR	TAL	CAL	RCH	CLT	DOV	POC	MCH	SON	DAY	CHI	NHA	POC	IND; 21	GLN	MCH	BRI	DAR; 27	RCH	NHA	DOV	KAN	TAL	CLT	MAR; 29	ATL	CAR	PHO; DNQ	HOM; 16	46th	404
2003	Ted Musgrave	07	Dodge	DAY	CAR	LVS	ATL	DAR	BRI	TEX	TAL	MAR	CAL	RCH	CLT	DOV	POC	MCH	SON	DAY	CHI	NHA	POC	IND; DNQ	GLN	MCH	BRI	DAR	RCH	NHA	DOV	TAL	KAN	CLT	MAR	ATL	PHO	CAR	HOM	73rd	22

== Craftsman Truck Series ==
=== Truck No. 1 history ===
The No. 1 truck made its CTS debut at the 2001 Florida Dodge Dealers 200. Ted Musgrave drove the Mopar-sponsored Dodge to a 22nd-place finish after suffering water pump failure. Musgrave was able to recover and won seven races that season. Musgrave won two races over the next two years, and almost won the championship in 2003, but lost it after jumping a restart at the season finale. During the course of the season, he had been diagnosed with bladder cancer. After another near miss at the title in 2004, Musgrave took only one win in 2005 but finally won the championship, the first in Ultra's history. Dodge announced during the season that they would stop supporting Ultra's team. Ultra spent the offseason trying to work out a deal with Ford, but talks fell off, and Ultra was forced to shut down. Smith would later say, in a 2011 interview, that while he had enough sponsorship to keep the team going (even without manufacturer support), the team would not be as competitive as he liked, and that, combined with missing his family while racing, led to his decision to close the doors. The equipment and owner's points were sold to R3 Racing.

==== Truck No. 1 results ====
Year	Driver	No.	Make	1	2	3	4	5	6	7	8	9	10	11	12	13	14	15	16	17	18	19	20	21	22	23	24	25	NCTC	Pts	Ref
2001	Ted Musgrave	1	Dodge	DAY; 22	HOM; 1*	MMR; 1*	MAR; 22	GTY; 1*	DAR; 31	PPR; 4	DOV; 4	TEX; 14	MEM; 6	MLW; 1	KAN; 2	KEN; 24*	NHA; 5	IRP; 23	NSH; 2	CIC; 7	NZH; 8	RCH; 4	SBO; 1*	TEX; 10	LVS; 1	PHO; 6	CAL; 1*		2nd	3597	
2002	Ted Musgrave	1	Dodge	DAY; 2	DAR; 1*	MAR; 24*	GTY; 12	PPR; 16	DOV; 1*	TEX; 5	MEM; 3	MLW; 5	KAN; 5	KEN; 9	NHA; 4	MCH; 32	IRP; 16	NSH; 3*	RCH; 7	TEX; 6	SBO; 14*	LVS; 9	CAL; 1*	PHO; 2	HOM; 2*				3rd	3308	
2003	Ted Musgrave	1	Dodge	DAY; 29	DAR; 2*	MMR; 5	MAR; 2	CLT; 1	DOV; 21	TEX; 13	MEM; 1*	MLW; 4	KAN; 15	KEN; 2	GTW; 7	MCH; 2	IRP; 6	NSH; 2	BRI; 15	RCH; 3*	NHA; 12	CAL; 1	LVS; 8	SBO; 3	TEX; 3	MAR; 10	PHO; 2	HOM; 13	3rd	3819	
2004	Ted Musgrave	1	Dodge	DAY; 26	ATL; 8	MAR; 15	MFD; 13	CLT; 31	DOV; 12	TEX; 2*	MEM; 3*	MLW; 1*	KAN; 30	KEN; 7	GTW; 3	MCH; 2	IRP; 25	NSH; 3	BRI; 27	RCH; 1*	NHA; 7	LVS; 8	CAL; 2*	TEX; 6	MAR; 5*	PHO; 19*	DAR; 3	HOM; 2	3rd	3554	
2005	Ted Musgrave	1	Dodge	DAY; 5	CAL; 5	ATL; 6	MAR; 7	GTY; 1*	MFD; 12	CLT; 3	DOV; 17	TEX; 14	MCH; 28	MLW; 3	KAN; 14	KEN; 5	MEM; 26	IRP; 14	NSH; 2	BRI; 6	RCH; 4	NHA; 3	LVS; 2	MAR; 4	ATL; 14	TEX; 14	PHO; 6	HOM; 19	1st	3535	

=== Truck No. 2 history ===
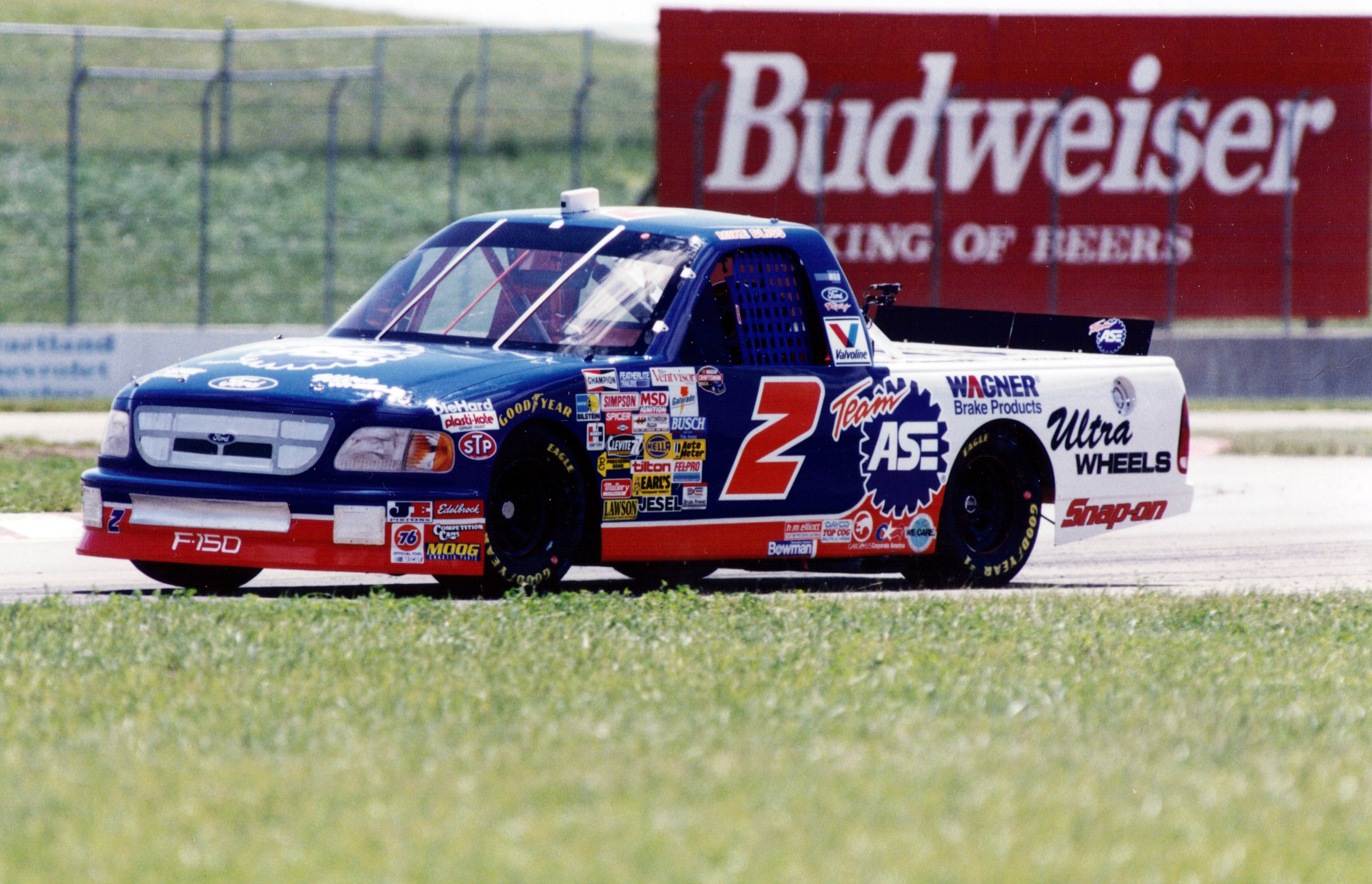
Mike Bliss in the No. 2 at Heartland Park Topeka in 1996

Ultra Motorsports made its official Truck debut in the series' first race, the Copper World Classic at Phoenix. The team was the No. 08 Ford F-150 driven by Mike Bliss, and sponsored by Smith's company, Ultra Custom Wheels. Finishing 14th in that race, Bliss ran with the team for the entire year, when it switched to No. 2 at Bristol. Bliss won once at North Wilkesboro and finished eighth in points that season. His crew chief Barry Dodson won 1989 Winston Cup championship with Rusty Wallace

In 1996, Team ASE Racing came on board as sponsor, and Bliss picked up two more wins and moved into fifth in points. After another top-five finish in 1997, Bliss slipped to tenth in the standings, and left for Roush Racing. Smith replaced him with Mike Wallace, who won in the first race of the season at Homestead-Miami Speedway. Another win at the NAPA 300K propelled Wallace to a sixth-place finish in points. After winning twice more in 2000, Wallace moved up to Ultra's Winston Cup program.

In addition to switching to Dodge Rams in 2001, Smith hired Scott Riggs to drive the No. 2. Riggs picked up five wins as well as three straight pole positions, and finished fifth in points. However, he moved up to ppc Racing in the Busch Series in the No. 10 Nestle Nesquik Ford, and Smith hired Jason Leffler to take his place. Although he did not win a race in 2002, Leffler had eight pole positions and fifteen top-ten finishes. Leffler returned to Ultra in 2003, and picked up a victory at the MBNA Armed Forces Family 200, but was fired for what was called a violation of his contract; Winston Cup owner Gene Haas had hired Leffler to temporarily take over the No. 0 NetZero Pontiac for Haas CNC Racing after regular driver Jack Sprague was fired and Smith dismissed him shortly thereafter. Jimmy Spencer and Andy Houston took over with Spencer picking up a win at Loudon. Houston returned for 2004, but he and the team struggled and he was released. P. J. Jones, Jamie McMurray and Kasey Kahne shared driving duties for the season, with McMurray and Kahne winning during their relief duties.

In 2005, Jimmy Spencer returned to the No. 2. Although he was unable to visit victory lane again, he put together nine top-ten finishes and a twelfth-place finish in points. It had already been decided not to run the No. 2 when Ultra announced it was closing its doors. The equipment and owner's points for this team were sold to Evernham Motorsports' ride for Erin Crocker.

=== Other teams ===
Smith fielded additional trucks in the Truck Series. In 1995, Butch Gilliland drove the No. 06 in five races for Ultra, and had one top-ten finish. Late in the season, Ultra fielded the No. 08 for John Borneman at Phoenix, who finished 29th. Eric Norris was selected as the driver of the No. 02 Wolverine Vinyl Siding Ford for five races, his best finish being 13th at Watkins Glen International.

In 1998, the No. 1 truck was occupied by Bliss while Dave Rezendes piloted the No. 2 in a one-race deal at Bristol. Later in the season, Kenny Irwin Jr. drove the No. 28 Cintas truck at Phoenix, finishing in the 20th position. The following season, Joe Ruttman ran one race in the No. 12 at the season opening Florida Dodge Dealers 400K, but exited early due to a vibration. The same fate befell Norris when he ran later in the season at Texas Motor Speedway. Leffler drove one race at IRP in 2000, the last extra entry Ultra would field for three years. In 2003, Ultra debuted the No. 7 Dodge Ram. Stuart Kirby, Tracy Hines and Tyler Walker piloted it that season.

In the 2003 Ford 200, Ultra fielded five trucks. This drew fire from fans and drivers, especially points leader Brendan Gaughan, who accused Smith as using the trucks as roadblocks to help Musgrave, who could overtake Gaughan for the points championship if he finished far enough ahead, take the championship. In addition to Musgrave's Mopar No. 1, Houston's Team ASE No. 2, and Walker's Dodge-sponsored No. 7, Smith entered the No. 10 Team ASE truck for Houston's brother Marty and the No. 27 Ultra Wheels truck for P. J. Jones. Gaughan would end up being taken out in a wreck with the No. 10 truck, cursing owner Jim Smith in his post race interview.

Gaughan's tirade was sprung from an incident where Marty Houston, who was driving Ultra's No. 10, got into an altercation involving Gaughan late in the race which knocked the points leader out of the race and cost him the championship. (As it turned out neither Gaughan nor Musgrave would become champion, as Musgrave was black flagged late in the race for passing before a restart and Travis Kvapil won the title instead; Kvapil himself was nearly taken out in the wreck.) The No. 7 would run final two races in 2004, with Norris driving. He would finish 13th at Homestead.
