= Frito-Lay Canada =

Canadian division of Frito-Lay

Frito-Lay Canada, Inc.
- Type: Division
- Industry: Food products
- Founded: 1935; 91 years ago (as Hostess Food Products); 1988; 38 years ago (as Hostess-Frito Lay Company)
- Founder: Edward Snyder
- Headquarters: 5550 Explorer Drive, 8th Floor; Mississauga, Ontario; L4W 0C3
- Area served: Canada
- Products: Lay's; Fritos; Doritos; Ruffles; Cheetos; Tostitos; Sun Chips; Miss Vickie's; Rold Gold; Smartfood
- Parent: Frito-Lay
- Website: www.tastyrewards.com/en-ca

Frito-Lay Canada, Inc., formerly the Hostess Frito-Lay Company (French: La Société Hostess Frito-Lay), is a Canadian division of the U.S.-based Frito-Lay owned as a subsidiary of PepsiCo that manufactures, markets and sells corn chips, potato chips and other snack foods. The primary snack food brands produced under the Frito-Lay name include Fritos corn chips, Cheetos cheese-flavored snacks, Doritos and Tostitos tortilla chips, Lay's and Ruffles potato chips, Smartfood flavored popcorn and Rold Gold pretzels. The company is headquartered in Mississauga, Ontario and has four production plants in Cambridge, Ontario; Lévis, Quebec; Kentville, Nova Scotia; and Taber/Lethbridge, Alberta.

== History ==
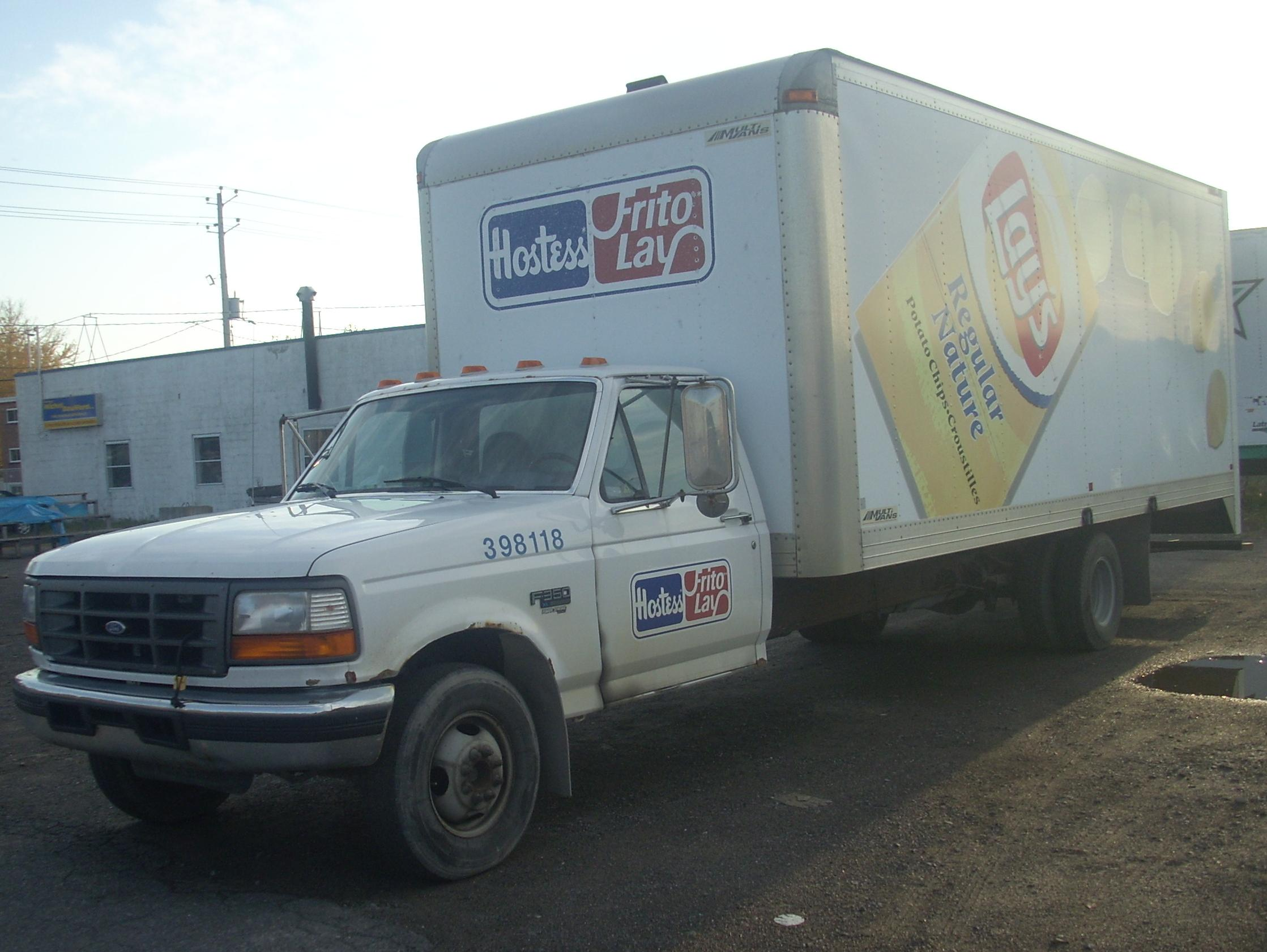
A Ford F-350 truck with the Hostess-Frito Lay logos.

The company was established in 1935 as Hostess Food Products by Edward Snyder when he began cooking chips on his mother's kitchen stove in Breslau, outside Kitchener, Ontario. Snyder later sold the Hostess to E.W. Vanstone in 1954 which in turn sold the business to General Foods in 1959.

Frito-Lay's roots began in the early 1930s as two separate companies, The Frito Company and H.W. Lay & Company, which merged in 1961 to form Frito-Lay, Inc. Four years later in 1965, Frito-Lay, Inc. merged with the Pepsi-Cola Company to form PepsiCo. Its presence in Canada began sometime in the late 1960s as Frito-Lay Canada as a subsidiary of PepsiCo.

In 1985, Hostess' owner General Foods gets bought by Tobacco Giant Philip Morris, which later bought Kraft Foods Inc. in 1988 and merged the 2 divisions as Kraft General Foods in 1989

A partnership to distribute snack foods developed between Hostess Food Products and Frito-Lay in 1987 and the merger was completed in 1988. The new organization became the Hostess Frito-Lay Company, Kraft General Foods and PepsiCo both owned a 50-50 stake in the new division in Canada.

In 1992, PepsiCo acquired the joint venture by buying out Kraft General Foods' remaining interest but retained the Hostess Frito-Lay name. In 2002, Hostess Frito-Lay was renamed to Frito-Lay Canada, Inc.

== Products ==
Much like its American counterpart, Frito-Lay Canada controls Frito-Lay product research and development, sales and distribution within Canada. Its primary brands include Lay's and Ruffles potato chips, Doritos tortilla chips, Tostitos tortilla chips and dips, Cheetos cheese flavored snacks, Fritos corn chips, Rold Gold pretzels, Sun Chips, and Smartfood popcorn. Products made by this division are sold to independent distributors and retailers and are transported from Frito-Lay's manufacturing plants to distribution centers, primarily in vehicles owned and operated by the company.
