= Matutano =

Spanish snack company

- Type: Sociedad anónima
- Industry: Food
- Founded: 1965; 61 years ago
- Founder: Luis Matutano
- Fate: Acquired by PepsiCo through Frito Lay in 1971
- Headquarters: Barcelona, Spain
- Products: Snack food

Matutano (officially Matutano Snack Ventures, S.A.) is a producer and distributor of snacks and potato chips with headquarters in Barcelona, operating the markets of Spain and Portugal (here through its subsidiary Matutano Unipessoal Lda.). The company was founded in 1965 by Luis Matutano Jover, and since 1971 is part of multinational Frito Lay.

Currently, Matutano distributes for the Iberian Peninsula PepsiCo snacks as Lays, Fritos, Cheetos, Doritos and Ruffles among other brands.

== History ==
The company originates in the 1950s, when spanish businessman Luis Matutano Jover founded in Barcelona a factory of snacks based on potatoes, a business his family exploited since 1873. Its production level was fairly modest until 1965 when the company's owner associated with the food group Pet Milk from United States to form the original Matutano brand, with an initial staff of 42 employees and 8 delivery routes. In 1969 the company bought Rick SA, founded by Augusto Aboitiz Baroja, with a production factory in Burgos, and the company started to expand to whole Spain.

In 1971 the multinational Frito Lay, part of PepsiCo, got the whole shares of the company and introduced most of their products in the Spanish market, as Cheetos (1975), Fritos (1976), Boca Bits (1981), Doritos (1984) and Ruffles (1986). In 1975 the characteristic logo of Matutano was adopted, a smiling face, and the company's image became popular. During the decades of 1970s and 1980s the company became the leader of Spanish market in potato chips and snacks, and started its expansion in Portugal.

With the arrival of Lays potatoes in 1997, Matutano changed its corporate image of all its products to adopt the Frito Lay logo. But the change was a failure, and in 2009 PepsiCo put back the smiling face as its corporate identity. The company motto is: Y hoy ¿Has sonreído? (Have you smiled today?)

== See also ==
- Frito-Lay
