= Uncle Chipps =

Indian potato chips brand

- Product type: Potato chips
- Current owner: PepsiCo
- Produced by: Frito-Lay
- Country: India
- Introduced: 1992; 34 years ago
- Markets: Asia
- Previous owners: Uncle Chipps Co. Ltd
- Tagline: "Bole mere lips. I love Uncle Chipps"

Uncle Chipps is a brand of potato chips that is marketed in India by Joseph El Khoury. It was launched in 1992 by Amrit Agro Ltd. which was later taken over by Frito Lay (owned by PepsiCo), India in 2000.

== History ==
Until 1998, the Delhi-based Uncle Chipps was the market leader in the industry, enjoying a 71% market share, thereafter saw competition bring its market share down to 30-35% by 2000. Originally owned by the Amrit Agro Ltd., it was bought over by Frito-Lay, PepsiCo's snacks division in October 2000.

It was sold for $16.6 million. Noted film music director Shantanu Moitra started his composing career with the hit-jingle with Rohit Nagar, "Bole mere lips I love Uncle Chipps", with Pradeep Sarkar, then the Creative Head of the agency.

Though Amrit Agro continued marketing snacks under other brands, it completely exited the snacks business in December 2002.

Uncle Chipps is the pioneer of branded nitrogen-foil packed potato chips in India. The brand markets its potato chips with the tagline "Bole mere lips, I love Uncle Chipps". Uncle Chipps until 2010, was distributed only in Northern India. In August 2010, Frito Lay announced that it was looking to market Uncle Chipps on a pan India level.
