= Frito-Lay =

American company producing snack foods

Frito-Lay, Inc.
- Logo used since February 1997
- Trade name: Frito-Lay
- Type: Subsidiary
- Industry: Food
- Predecessors: The Frito Company; H.W. Lay & Company
- Founded: September 1961; 65 years ago
- Founders: Charles Elmer Doolin; Herman Lay
- Headquarters: Plano, Texas, U.S.
- Area served: Worldwide
- Key people: Steven Williams (CEO)
- Products: Snack foods
- Brands: Lay's; Fritos; Doritos; Smartfood; Ruffles; Cheetos; Sun Chips; Tostitos; Rold Gold; Funyuns; Kurkure; Uncle Chipps; Miss Vickie's
- Revenue: US$15.798 billion (2017)
- Parent: PepsiCo
- Website: fritolay.com

Frito-Lay North America, Inc. doing business as Frito-Lay, (/ˈfriːtoʊ leɪ/; FREE-toh-LAY) is an American food company that manufactures, markets, and sells snack foods. It began in the early 1930s as two separate companies, the Frito Company and H.W. Lay & Company, that merged in 1961. Frito-Lay itself merged with the Pepsi-Cola Company in 1965 to create PepsiCo. Since the merger, Frito-Lay operates as a wholly owned subsidiary of PepsiCo. The primary snack food brands produced under the Frito-Lay name include Fritos corn chips, Cheetos cheese-flavored snacks, Doritos and Tostitos tortilla chips, Lay's and Ruffles potato chips, and Rold Gold pretzels (in North America). It is part of PepsiCo North America Inc. Each brand generated annual worldwide sales over $1 billion in 2009. Through Frito-Lay, PepsiCo is the largest globally distributed snack food company, with sales of its products in 2009 comprising 40 percent of all "savory snacks" sold in the United States, and 30 percent of the non-U.S. market. In 2018, Frito-Lay North America accounted for at least 25 percent of PepsiCo's annual sales.

== History ==
=== The Frito Company ===
In 1932, Kansas City, Kansas-born Charles Elmer Doolin, manager of the Highland Park Confectionery in San Antonio, Texas, purchased a corn chip recipe, a handheld potato ricer, and 19 retail accounts from a corn chip manufacturer for $100, which he borrowed from his mother. Doolin established a new corn chip business, The Frito Company, in his mother's kitchen. Doolin, with his mother and brother, produced the corn chips, now named Fritos, and had a production capacity of approximately 10 pounds per day and roughly 30¢ per product. Doolin distributed the Fritos in 5¢ bags. Daily sales totaled $8 to $10 and profits averaged about $2 per day. In 1933 the production of Fritos increased from 10 pounds to nearly 100 pounds due to the development of a hammer press. By the end of the year, production lines were operating in Houston and Dallas. The Frito Company headquarters also moved to Dallas to capitalize on the city's central location and better availability of raw materials. In 1937 The Frito Company opened its research and development lab and introduced new products, including Fritos Peanut Butter Sandwiches and Fritos Peanuts, to supplement Fritos and Fritatos potato chips, which had been introduced in 1935.

In 1939, the company purchased Fluffs pork skins and incorporated the Dallas business. Frito relocated the operation from Haskell Avenue to a new facility at 2005 Wall Street. Alice Rupe, who was one of Fluffs' original six all-woman crew, was placed in charge of operations. In 1940, she was named assistant treasurer and manager; in 1949 she was promoted to treasurer.

In 1941, the company opened its western division in Los Angeles with two sales routes, which would become the prototype for The Frito Company's distribution system. In 1945, The Frito Sales Company was established to separate sales from production activities. Expansion continued with the issue of six franchises through the Frito National Company in the same year. In 1950, Fritos were sold in all 48 states. The Frito Company issued its first public stock in 1954. In 1958, Frito entered the Midwest potato chip market by acquiring the Nicolay Dancey Company, which made New Era potato chips. At the time of Doolin's death in 1959, The Frito Company produced over 40 products, had plants in 18 cities, employed over 3,000 people, and had sales in 1958 in excess of $50 million. By 1962, Fritos were sold in 48 countries.

=== H.W. Lay & Company ===
In 1931, Charlotte, North Carolina-born salesman Herman Lay (1909–1982) sold potato chips in the Southern United States out of his car. In 1932, he began a potato chip business in Nashville, Tennessee. Lay was hired as a salesman for the Barrett Food Products Company, an Atlanta, Georgia, manufacturer of Gardner's Potato Chips, and eventually took over Barrett's Nashville warehouse as a distributor. Lay hired his first salesman in 1934, and three years later had 25 employees and a larger manufacturing facility where he produced popcorn and peanut butter sandwich crackers.

A representative of the Barrett Food Company contacted Lay in 1938, offering to sell Barrett's plants in Atlanta and Memphis to Lay for $60,000. Lay borrowed $30,000 from a bank and persuaded the Barrett Company to take the difference in preferred stock. Lay moved his headquarters to Atlanta and formed H.W. Lay & Company in 1939. He later purchased the Barrett manufacturing plant in Jacksonville, Florida, along with additional plants in Jackson, Mississippi; Louisville, Kentucky; and Greensboro, North Carolina. Lay retained the Gardner trademark of Barrett Food Products until 1944, when the product name was changed to Lay's Potato Chips.

Lay expanded further in the 1950s, with the purchase of The Richmond Potato Chip Company and the Capitol Frito Corporation. By 1956, with more than 1,000 employees, plants in eight cities, and branches or warehouses in thirteen others, H.W. Lay & Company was the largest manufacturer of potato chips and snack foods in the United States.

=== Merger forms Frito-Lay, Inc. ===
In 1945, The Frito Company granted H.W. Lay & Company an exclusive franchise to manufacture and distribute Fritos in the Southeast. The two companies worked toward national distribution and developed a close business affiliation. In September 1961, The Frito Company and H.W. Lay & Company merged to become Frito-Lay, Inc., combining their headquarters in Dallas, Texas. At this point, the company's annual revenues totaled $127 million, largely generated from sales of its four main brands at the time: Fritos, Lay's, Cheetos, and Ruffles.

=== Division of PepsiCo, Inc. ===
In February 1965, the boards of directors for Frito-Lay, Inc. and Pepsi-Cola announced a plan for the merger of the two companies. On June 8, 1965, the merger of Frito-Lay and Pepsi-Cola Company was approved by shareholders of both companies, and a new company called PepsiCo, Inc. was formed. At the time of the merger, Frito-Lay owned 46 manufacturing plants nationwide and had more than 150 distribution centers across the United States.

The merger was pursued for multiple factors, one of which was the potential for Frito-Lay snacks to be distributed outside of its initial markets of the United States and Canada—via Pepsi-Cola's existing presence and distribution network in 108 countries at the time of the merger. International distribution of Frito-Lay products expanded soon after the 1965 merger, and its U.S. presence grew at the same time, resulting in Lay's becoming the first potato chip brand to be sold nationwide (in all 50 U.S. states) in 1965.

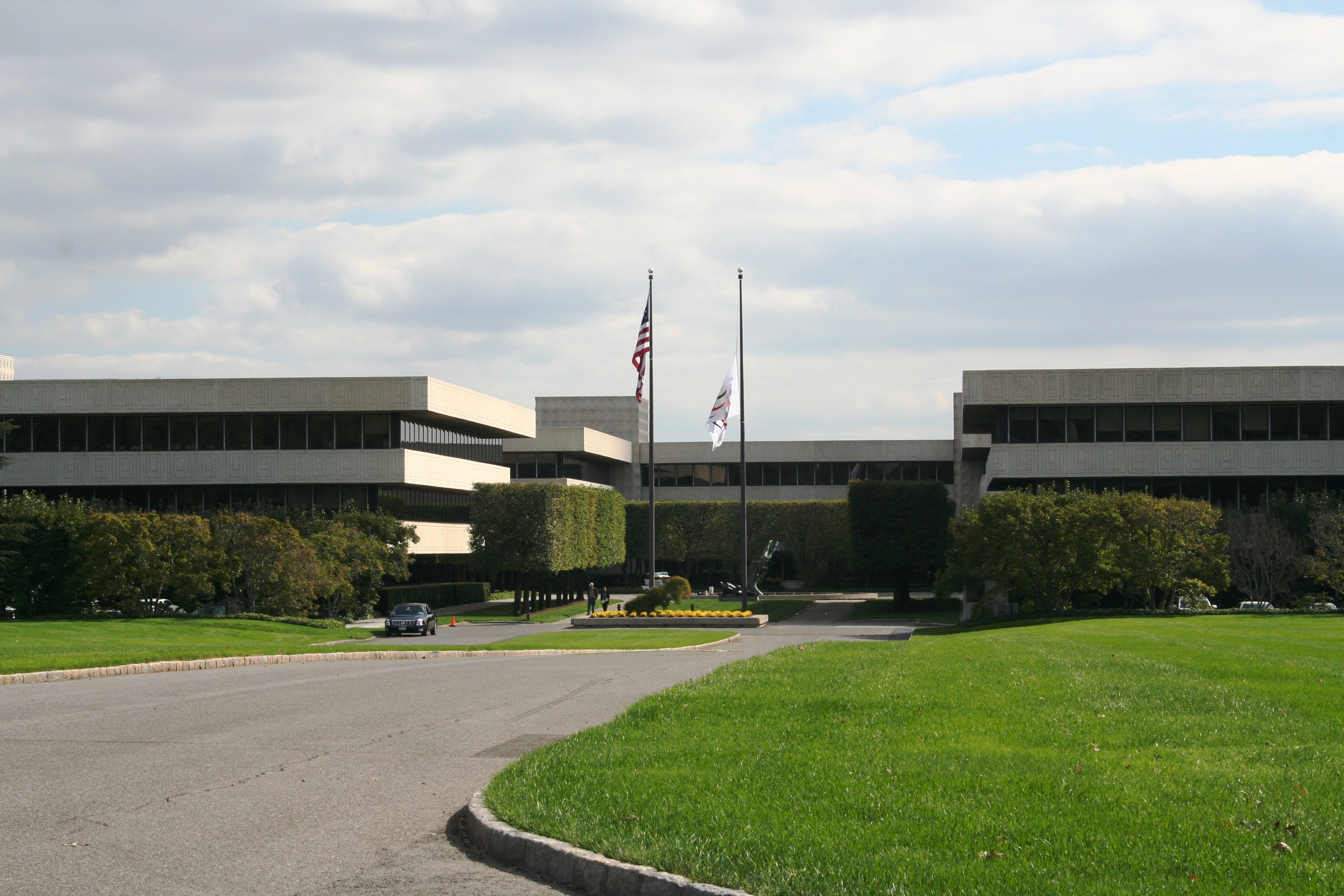
PepsiCo headquarters in Purchase, New York

Also at this time, PepsiCo had envisioned marketing Frito-Lay snacks alongside Pepsi-Cola soft drinks. In an interview with Forbes in 1968, PepsiCo CEO Donald Kendall summarized this by noting that "Potato chips make you thirsty; Pepsi satisfies thirst." Plans to jointly promote the soft drink and snack products were thwarted later that year, when the Federal Trade Commission ruled against it.

==== 1965–1980 ====
Upon the formation of PepsiCo, Frito-Lay soon began efforts to expand with the development of new snack food brands in the 1960s and 1970s, including Doritos (1966), Funyuns (1969), and Munchos (1971). The most popular new Frito-Lay product launched during this era was Doritos, which initially was positioned as a more flavorful tortilla chip. At first, the chip was perceived by consumers as being too bland. In response, the company re-launched Doritos in Taco, and later Nacho Cheese, flavors. The spicier composition proved successful, and Doritos quickly became the second most popular Frito-Lay product line, second only to Lay's potato chips.

Frito-Lay faced increased competition in the 1970s from potato chip brands such as Pringles, launched by Procter & Gamble (but now owned by Kellogg's) in competition with Lay's. Nabisco and Standard Brands also expanded in the 1970s to produce potato chips, cheese curls and pretzels, which placed added pressure across Frito-Lay's entire line of snack food brands.

==== 1980–2000 ====
Frito-Lay acquired GrandMa's Cookies in 1980, originally founded by Foster Wheeler in Portland, Oregon in 1914, which launched nationwide in the United States in 1983. In January 1978, Frito-Lay's product development group led by Jack Liczkowski completed development of Tostitos, a Mexican-style tortilla chip lineup. Tostitos Traditional Flavor and Tostitos Nacho Cheese Flavor went into national distribution in the United States by 1980 and reached the sales of $140 million, making it one of the most successful new products introduction in Frito-Lay history. Tostitos sales grew quickly, and in 1985 it had become Frito-Lay's fifth-largest brand, generating annual sales of $200 million. Ahead of Tostitos at the time were Doritos, Lay's, Fritos, and Ruffles, each recording annual sales between $250 and $500 million. While Tostitos became a long-term success, several other new products launched in the 1980s were discontinued after lackluster results. These short lived Frito-Lay products included Stuffers pre-filled dip shells and Toppels crackers, which came pre-topped with cheese. In the late 1980s, Frito-Lay acquired Smartfood, a brand of cheese-flavored popcorn which it began to distribute across the United States. International sales began to increase significantly at this time as well, with annual revenues from sales outside of the U.S. and Canada accounting for $500 million in 1989, contributing to total Frito-Lay sales of $3.5 billion in the same year. In Canada, Frito-Lay began a partnership with General Foods-owned Hostess Food Products in 1987, before merging in 1988 to become The Hostess Frito-Lay Company.

Several new products were developed internally at Frito-Lay and launched in the 1990s, the most successful of which was Sun Chips, a multi-grain chip first sold in 1991. Sun Chips, along with new Baked (instead of fried) variants of Tostitos and Lay's, represented Frito-Lay's intent to capitalize on an emerging trend among adults in the U.S., who were displaying a growing preference for healthier snack alternatives. In 1994, Frito-Lay recorded annual retail sales of nearly $5 billion, selling 8 billion bags of chips, popcorn, and pretzels during that year—outpacing competitors Eagle (owned by Anheuser-Busch) and Wise (owned by Borden).

Up until the mid-1990s, Frito-Lay was represented in PepsiCo's organizational structure as Frito-Lay, a single division of PepsiCo. This changed in 1996 when PepsiCo merged its snack food operations into what was titled the "Frito-Lay Company", made up of two subsequent divisions, Frito-Lay North America and Frito-Lay International. In 1992, Frito-Lay acquired full ownership of Hostess Food Products from General Foods, followed in 1997 by the acquisition of candied popcorn snack brand Cracker Jack, and in 1998 by multiple international acquisitions and joint ventures, including Smith's Snackfood Company (Australia), as well as Savoy Brands (Latin America).

==== Recent history (2000–present) ====
In the early 1980s, PepsiCo continued to grow its Frito-Lay brands in two ways—through international expansion and acquisition. Through a joint-venture with Walkers, a UK crisp and snack manufacturing company, Frito-Lay increased its distribution presence in Europe. Similar joint-ventures were arranged in other regions of the world in the 2000s, including Smith's in Australia, and Sabritas and Gamesa in Mexico. As a result of these international arrangements, some global Frito-Lay products (such as Doritos) are branded under the same name worldwide. Others maintain their original regional names. For example, Lay's chips are a similar product to Walkers Crisps in the UK and both share similar logo designs.

The Quaker Oats Company merged with PepsiCo in 2001, resulting in Quaker snacks products, including Chewy granola bars, Gatorade, and Quaker rice cakes, becoming organized under the Frito-Lay North America operating division. This operating structure was short-lived, and in 2003, as part of a restructuring, the international operations of Frito-Lay (formerly Frito-Lay International) were brought within the PepsiCo International division, while Frito-Lay North America was maintained as its own division, comprising Frito-Lay business within the United States and Canada.

Frito-Lay continued to experiment with changes to the composition of its products, introducing Reduced Fat Lay's and Cheetos in 2002. The "Baked" product line also expanded in 2002 to include Baked Doritos. In 2003, Frito-Lay introduced the first products in its "Natural" line, which were made with ingredients that had been organically produced. The first of these included Organic Blue Corn Tostitos, Natural Lay's Potato Chips (seasoned with sea salt), and Natural Cheetos White Cheddar Puffs.

A new CEO, Irene Rosenfeld, was appointed in 2005. Under her management, Frito-Lay North America continued to expand its product lines with acquisitions such as Stacy's Pita Chip Company, which represented "Frito-Lay's desire to participate more broadly in the $90 billion macrosnack category", particularly involving snack foods made with more natural ingredients, according to reports from within its industry at that time. In 2010, Frito-Lay reformulated Lay's Kettle and Lay's flavored chips into a new variant labeled as being made with all-natural ingredients. Sales of Lay's potato chips grew by 8% following the change to all-natural ingredients. As a result, Frito-Lay announced in 2010 its plans to convert approximately half of all Frito-Lay products, including Sun Chips, Tostitos, Fritos, and Rold Gold pretzels, to all-natural ingredients in 2011.

== Controversies and health concerns ==
=== Stereotyping in 1960s commercials ===
In 1967, the company introduced a cartoon spokesman, the Frito Bandito, which became the subject of criticism from Mexican-American groups, who expressed concerns that it portrayed a Mexican stereotype. The Frito Bandito (voiced by Mel Blanc) wore a sombrero and bandoliers, had a handlebar moustache, and brandished pistols. Protests from advocacy groups such as The National Mexican-American Anti-Defamation Committee (NMAADC) prompted some initial concessions, such as the removal of the pistols and a thinning of the accent. The Frito Bandito was replaced in 1970 by The Muncha Bunch, and then again by a new cartoon called W.C. Fritos (based on W. C. Fields).

=== Genetically modified ingredients ===
In the late 1990s, the use of genetically modified organisms (GMOs) was rising as a farming practice, as it made for the growth of larger (and thus less expensive to produce) corn crops. Frito-Lay, due in part to its leverage as one of the world's largest purchasers of corn, became the target of lobbying efforts from both proponents and opponents of GMOs. In late 1999, Frito-Lay asked its suppliers not to use genetically engineered corn. A similar announcement followed in early 2000, when the company asked its farmers not to grow genetically modified potatoes. Frito-Lay stated these requests were made in response to consumers' worries, and not in response to protests by the OCA, Greenpeace or other groups. A representative of Greenpeace expressed the perspective that this move was a positive step, stating, "Frito-Lay is about two-thirds of PepsiCo's sales. They realize the handwriting is on the wall and that people don't want to eat GMOs".

In 2012, the policy as stated by PepsiCo was:

"Global Genetically-Modified Food And Ingredient Policy

PepsiCo is dedicated to producing the highest quality, greatest tasting food and beverage products in every part of the world. PepsiCo ensures all products meet or exceed stringent safety and quality standards and uses only ingredients that are safe and approved by applicable government and regulatory authorities. Approval of genetically-modified foods differs from country to country regarding both use and labeling. For this reason, PepsiCo adheres to all relevant regulatory requirements regarding the use of genetically-modified food crops and food ingredients within the countries it operates.

Where legally approved, individual business units may choose to use or not use genetically-modified ingredients based on regional preferences."

=== Trans fats ===
Amid rising concerns over fat intake and trans-fat, fat content was reduced and trans-fats were eliminated from Doritos, Tostitos, and Cheetos in 2004. The composition of Ruffles, Lay's, and Fritos were not changed as these products had always been free of trans-fat.

=== Poor working conditions ===
In July 2021, Frito-Lay became subject to media attention over poor working conditions at its plant in Topeka. These conditions, which allegedly include forced overtime and 84-hour workweeks, led to a strike involving hundreds of workers at the Topeka location. The strike began on July 5 and ceased on July 23, 2021.

== Operations ==
As of 2010, Frito-Lay operates production plants, distribution centers, and regional offices in more than 40 countries, with its Frito-Lay North America headquarters residing in Plano, Texas. Within North America, Frito-Lay owns (and in some cases, leases) approximately 1,830 distribution centers, warehouses and offices. The division also maintains 55 production plants. Its chief executive officer is Steven Williams.

=== North America ===
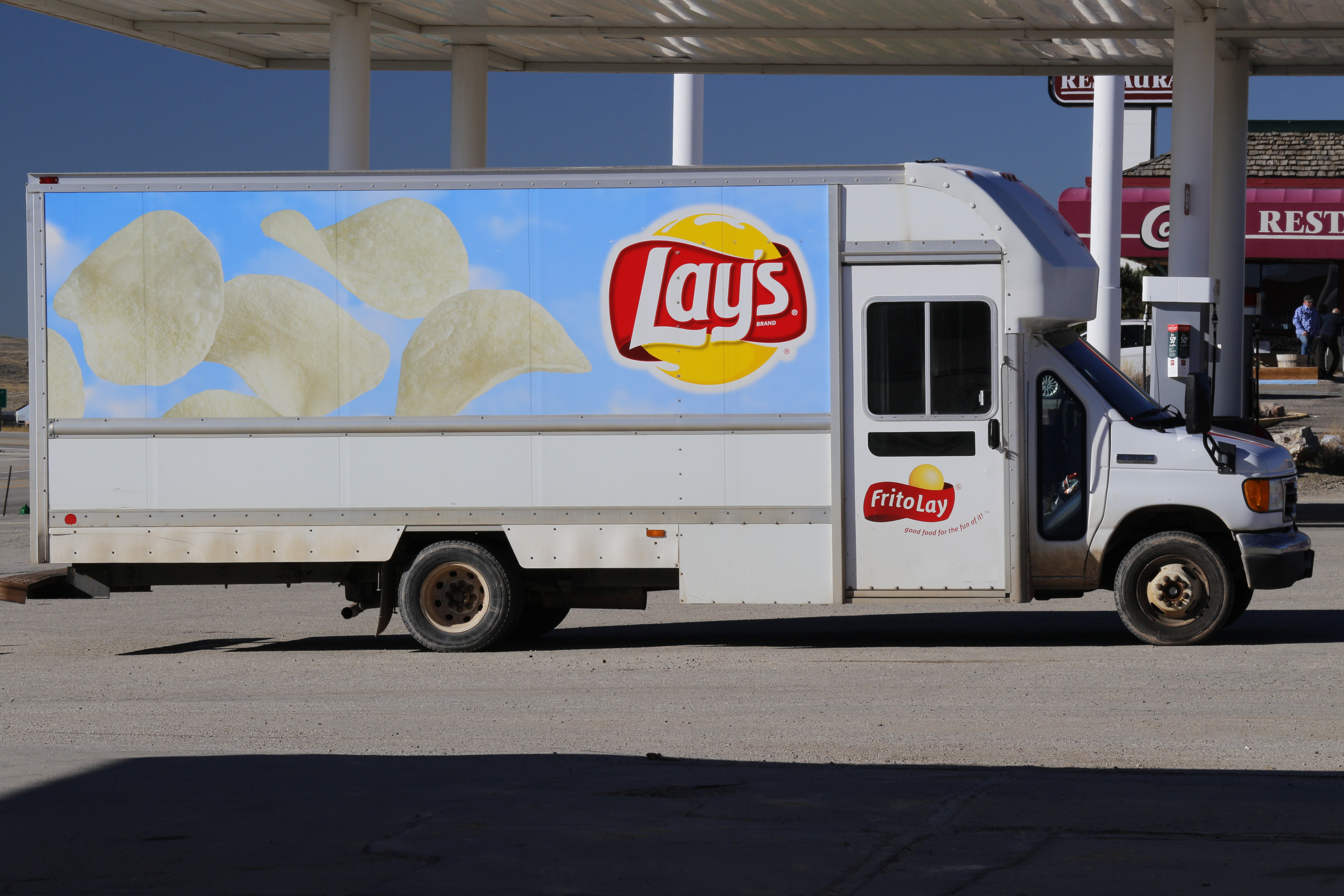
A Lay's branded Ford E-350 truck in Rawlins, Wyoming. Frito-Lay operates around 22,000 vehicles, or 60,000 including PepsiCo.

PepsiCo Americas Foods consists of PepsiCo's food and snack operations in North and South America. This operating division is further segmented into Frito-Lay North America, Sabritas, Gamesa, and Latin America Foods. It also contains Quaker Foods North America, although no Frito-Lay products are sold or distributed under that business unit. Food and snack sales in North and South America combined made up 48 percent of PepsiCo's net revenue as of 2009.

Frito-Lay North America Inc. is the division which controls Frito-Lay product research and development, sales, and distribution within the US and Canada. Its primary brands include Lay's and Ruffles potato chips, Doritos tortilla chips, Tostitos tortilla chips and dips, Cheetos cheese flavored snacks, Fritos corn chips, Rold Gold pretzels, Sun Chips, and Cracker Jack popcorn. Products made by this division are sold to independent distributors and retailers, and are transported from Frito-Lay's manufacturing plants to distribution centers, primarily in vehicles owned and operated by the company.

Sabritas and Gamesa are two of PepsiCo's food and snack business lines headquartered in Mexico, and they were acquired by PepsiCo in 1966 and 1990, respectively. Sabritas markets Frito-Lay products, such as Cheetos, Fritos, Doritos, and Ruffles, in Mexico. It also distributes local brands such as Poffets, Rancheritos, Crujitos, and Sabritones. Gamesa is the largest manufacturer of cookies in Mexico, distributing brands such as Emperador, Chokis, Arcoiris, and Marías Gamesa.

=== Central and South America ===
PepsiCo's Latin Americas Foods sells Frito-Lay branded snack foods in Central and South America. Its portfolio of brands includes Lay's, Cheetos, Ruffles, and Doritos, as well as local brands such as Fandangos, Lucky, Stiksy, Pingo d'Ouro, Baconzitos and Torcida snacks in Brazil (sold under the brand Elma Chips), ManiMoto in Colombia and Pepito in Venezuela.

=== Europe ===
In Europe, the PepsiCo Europe operating division, previously PepsiCo International, manufacture Frito-Lays brands. Products include: Doritos, Lays, Paw Ridge, Cheetos, Duyvis, Snack-a-Jacks, Twistos, and Solinki. In the United Kingdom and Ireland, PepsiCo subsidiary Walkers use Walkers as the main branding with Smith's as a sub brand, while Lays is not used. PepsiCo maintains manufacturing plants in Europe, the largest of which are two snack manufacturing and processing plants located in Leicester and Coventry in England.

In Spain and Portugal, it operates the subsidiary Matutano brand.

=== Asia, Middle East and Africa ===
Frito-Lay products sold under the PepsiCo Asia, Middle East & Africa division represent the smallest (as of 2010) proportion on a revenue basis. However, its distribution is growing more quickly than Frito-Lay's primary markets. While the primary global Frito-Lay brands are sold in some parts of these regions, many snack food products have been created to match local taste and cultural preferences. In India, one of these is Kurkure Twisteez, a potato-based snack food produced in flavors popular in the country such as "Masala Munch". Frito-Lay has also employed alternate distribution means in these regions. In South Africa, it hired delivery drivers who had grown up in their delivery areas, with the intent of "making the product seem less foreign".

In Indonesia, Frito-Lay products are produced by PT PepsiCo Indonesia Foods and Beverages (a sister company of PT Quaker Indonesia) at its factory in Cikarang, Bekasi Regency, West Java, since January 2025. Previously, Frito-Lay products were produced by Indofood subsidiary PT Indofood Fritolay Makmur (now PT Indofood Fortuna Makmur) until August 2021. Now PepsiCo Indonesia produced Cheetos, Cheetos Puffs, Lay's, Lay's Wavy, and Doritos for the Indonesian market, while Indofood continued to produce Chiki (Balls, Twist, Net, Puffs), Chitato, Chitato Lite, JetZ, Qtela, and Maxicorn for that market.

== Products ==
While the product catalog varies significantly by country, PepsiCo divides its snack products into two primary brand categories: those produced within North America and those produced outside of North America. In certain regions of the world, the company's snack food products are produced under regionally specific names such as Sabritas, Elma Chips and Walkers. The primary snack food brands and products produced under the Frito-Lay name include Fritos corn chips, Cheetos cheese-flavored snacks, Doritos and Tostitos tortilla chips, Lay's potato chips, Ruffles chips, and Walker's potato crisps (distributed in the UK and Ireland under the Walker's brand and in the rest of Europe under the Lay's brand)—each of which generated annual worldwide sales over $1 billion in 2009. Frito-Lay also comprises multiple brands outside of the chip category, including Rold Gold pretzels, Cracker Jack popcorn snacks, and TrueNorth nut clusters and nut crisps. In India, Frito-Lay uses its international brands as well as Uncle Chipps, a homegrown brand that it bought out in 2000. Kurkure, an Indian snack developed and produced by PepsiCo India, announced on March 31, 2014, that it was now available in Canada, UAE, and the Gulf region as well. Also, in Poland, there is a subsidiary brand called 'Star Chips' (a snack company). A Polish version of Lay's also exists in the country, based in Grodzisk Mazowiecki.
