= Miss Vickie's =

Canadian brand of potato chips

Miss Vickies
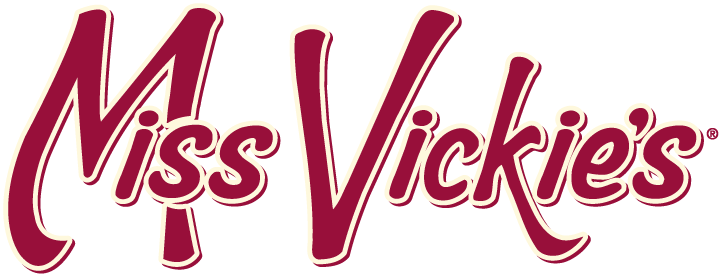
- Product type: Potato chips
- Current owner: PepsiCo
- Produced by: Frito-Lay
- Country: Canada
- Introduced: 1987; 39 years ago
- Markets: North America, Europe
- Website: missvickies.ca

Miss Vickie's is a Canadian brand of potato chips made by Frito-Lay in the United States, Canada, and the United Kingdom. The chips are kettle cooked and come in a variety of flavours. They are sold in Canada, Europe, and the United States. Originating on a farm in rural Ontario from a recipe her mother had given to her, company co-founder Vickie "Miss Vickie" Kerr slightly altered her inherited recipe by adding peanut oil to the potato chips, but they are no longer cooked in peanut oil today.

== History ==
The recipe originated with Vickie and Bill Kerr, at their potato farm in New Lowell, Ontario. The chips saw their debut at the 14th annual Alliston Potato Festival in 1987, gained quick popularity amongst festival attendees and completely sold out. Over the next few years, the chips were produced and marketed from Pointe-Claire, Quebec, and became popular throughout all of Canada, holding 1% of the national market.

On February 1, 1993, Miss Vickie's was purchased by Hostess Frito-Lay.

== Flavours ==
Miss Vickie's currently sells 12 different flavours of chips in Canada including: Original Recipe, Unsalted, Sea Salt & Malt Vinegar, Jalapeño, Applewood Smoked BBQ, Spicy Dill Pickle, Sour Cream Herb & Onion, Honey Dijon, and the exclusive flavours of Lime & Black Pepper, All Dressed Up, Sweet & Spicy Ketchup, and Sweet Chili & Sour Cream. There is also a Ristorani series of flavours that includes Vodka Sauce Pizza, Cacio E Pepe, and Spicy Pepperoncini & Focaccia.

In the United States, the logo and packaging of Miss Vickie's is distinct. This line includes the original flavours of: Sea Salt Original (Original recipe), Sea Salt & Malt Vinegar, Jalapeño, Applewood Smoked BBQ, Spicy Dill Pickle, Sour Cream Herb & Onion, Honey Mustard (Honey Dijon), along with two exclusive flavours: Smokehouse BBQ and Aged Cheddar & Black Pepper.

Discontinued flavours include: Roasted Red Pepper Grill, Balsamic Vinegar & Sweet Onion, Parmesan & Roasted Garlic, Sweet Southern BBQ, Roasted Garlic & Herbs, Honey & Roasted Garlic, Sour Cream & Caramelized Onion, and Vintage Cheddar & Red Onion.

Customers can purchase selected flavours in individual bags and a collection of flavours in assorted boxes.
