= Kurkure =

Indian spicy puffcorn snack

- Official logo
- Current owner: PepsiCo (Frito-Lay)
- Country: India
- Introduced: 1999; 27 years ago (India); 2008; 18 years ago (Pakistan)

Kurkure is an Indian brand of spiced crunchy puffcorn snacks made up of rice, lentil and corn. It is owned by PepsiCo through its subsidiary Frito-Lay. It was launched in India in 1999 and nine years later, it was launched in Pakistan in 2008. The snack is manufactured in India and in Pakistan, and has limited availability in certain international markets such as Canada and the United Kingdom. The word Kurkure means "crunchy" in Hindi and Urdu languages.

In India, it is manufactured in Sangrur, Pune, Howrah, Sonipat, Ranga Reddy, Vaishali and Kamrup and in Pakistan, it is manufactured in Gulberg, Lahore.

== Ingredients ==
Kurkure is made from rice meal, edible vegetable oil (gingelly oil), corn meal, gram meal, spices (such as turmeric), condiments, salt, sugar, tartaric, and E631. Kurkure is not completely vegan as the PepsiCo India website in a PDF listing the ingredients show milk solids as one of the ingredients.

It contains natural, nature-identical, and artificial flavoring substances.

== Flavors ==
=== India ===
==== Currently available flavors ====
- Masala Munch
- Hyderabadi Hungama
- Chilli Chatka
- Schezwan Chutney
- Solid Masti
- Jowar Puffs
- Pastax
- PuffCorns (Yummy Cheese)

==== Discontinued flavors ====
- Tamatar Hyderabadi Style
- Malabar Masala Style
- Masala Twists (Solid Masti)
- Chatpata Cheese
- Desi Beats
- Naughty Tomato
- Angry Tomato
- Xtreme Electric Nimbu
- Xtreme Risky Chilli
- Monster Paws
- Zig Zag
- Corn Cups
- Monster Smilees
- Monster Paws
- Butter Masti
- Kurkure triangles
- Khatta meetha
- Sizzling hot
- Multigrain
- Chaat fills
- Gazab Golmaal
- Herapheri Hungama

=== Pakistan ===
- Chutney Chaska
- Red Chilli Jhatka
- Toofaani mirch

== Launching ==
Kurkure was originated in India in 1999; in 2001 Indian television actresses Mandira Bedi and Pooja Ghai appeared in few commercials of Kurkure and served for the new brand . In 2004, Indian Hindi film actress Juhi Chawla was featured in advertisements for Kurkure. and from 2008 Kareena Kapoor was endorsing a new range (Kurkure Desi beats) under the main brand. Kurkure was launched in Tamil media in 2008 with actress Simran as its brand ambassador. In 2012, Parineeti Chopra, Kunal Kapoor, Boman Irani, Ramya Krishnan, and Farida Jalal, started to advertise Kurkure. In 2019 Samantha Ruth Prabhu and Taapsee Pannu acted in Hindi, Tamil and Telugu commercials of Kurkure. In 2021 and 2022 Akshay Kumar appeared in Kurkure commercials along with Kritika Kamra and Samantha Ruth Prabhu. In 2024, actress Sara Ali Khan acted in Kurkure's Hindi commercial.

Kurkure was launched in Pakistan in 2008. Actresses Ayesha Omar, Hania Aamir and Iqra Aziz have all been featured in television commercials for Kurkure in the country.

In November 2006, Frito-Lay announced plans to release Kurkure to American markets in 2007. This decision was made after analysts showed increasing interest in Indian spices in the region. Kurkure was subsequently introduced in other markets with a significant non-resident Indian population such as the UK. As of 2010, Kurkure is available in Eastern Canada. As of 2013, Kurkure is available in Western Canada.
