= Rold Gold =

American brand of pretzels

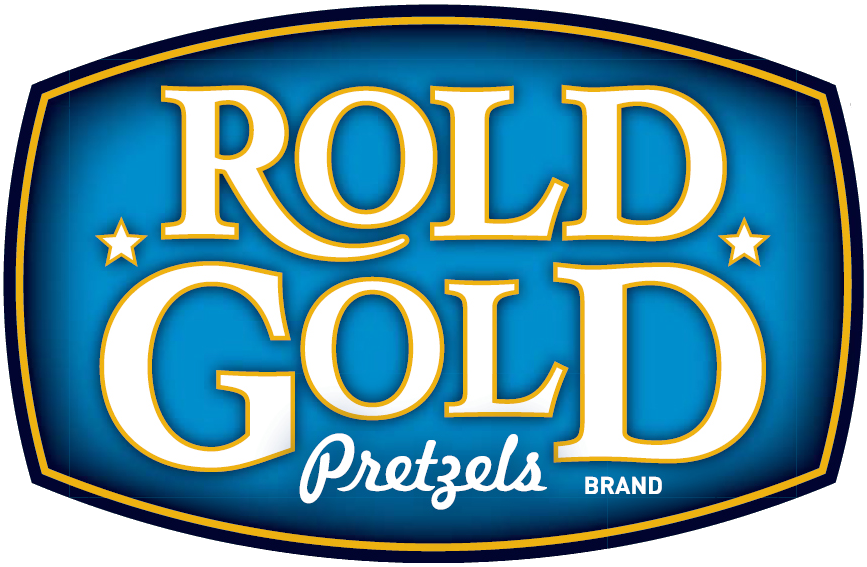
- Product type: Pretzels
- Current owner: PepsiCo
- Produced by: Frito-Lay
- Country: United States
- Introduced: 1917; 109 years ago
- Markets: United States
- Previous owners: American Cone and Pretzel Company
- Website: https://www.roldgold.com/

Rold Gold refers to first a company and then a remaining brand of pretzels, now owned by Frito-Lay. The company, originally named "American Cone and Pretzel Company", was founded in 1917 by Philadelphia businessman Lorraine Schumaker.

Run for its first half century as a family business, Rold Gold expanded its operations to St. Louis, Missouri, and El Segundo, California, and established a reputation for producing pretzels. From 1921 until 1955, the company also owned the Continental Packing Company, a pimento canning plant located near Macon, Georgia, but sold that part of the business in 1955, in response to increasing competition from overseas canners. In 1960, The Schumaker family attempted to sell Rold Gold to Red Dot Foods Inc. in Madison, Wisconsin, but the deal fell through when Red Dot went bankrupt and its principal owner committed suicide. Frito-Lay then purchased Rold Gold in 1961 and has owned the pretzel company ever since.

In the years since its purchase by Frito-Lay, Rold Gold has expanded its sales nationwide. While on-bag advertising formerly stated that Rold Gold was "America's No. 1 Pretzel", when measured by total dollar sales in the United States, Rold Gold was the #2 pretzel brand behind Snyder's of Hanover as of 2014.

Rold Gold pretzels offer a range of pretzel and snack products. All of these items are baked, not fried, and most are lactose free.
