= Sun Chips =

American snack chip brand

SunChips

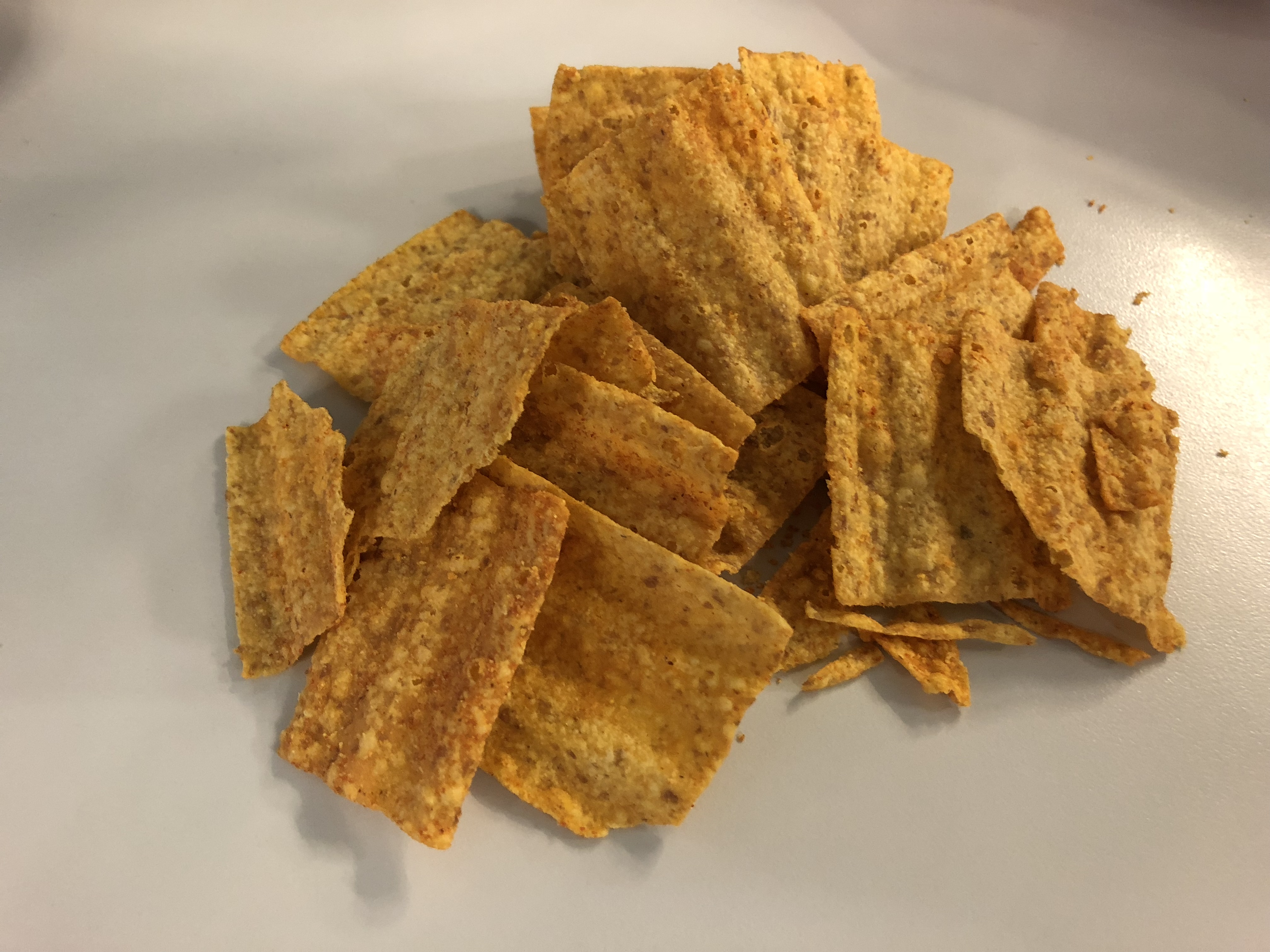
- Product type: Chips
- Current owner: PepsiCo
- Produced by: Frito-Lay
- Country: United States
- Introduced: October 9, 1989; 37 years ago
- Markets: Worldwide
- Tagline: "Deliciousness for all"
- Website: sunchips.com

Sun Chips (styled SunChips or SUNCHIPS) is a brand of fried, rippled, multigrain chips produced by Frito-Lay.

== History ==
Frito-Lay had first introduced a multigrain snack chip in 1974 under the name Prontos. The launch of Prontos was unsuccessful, with issues in the manufacturing process and low sales, and the product was discontinued in 1978. In 1981, Frito-Lay research and development revived the multigrain concept under the codename "Harvest", hoping to create a healthier alternative to potato and corn chips that would appeal to aging baby boomers. Some concepts were privately tested but proved unsuccessful, and the project was shelved until 1988. After another renewed effort with an additional 13 months of taste-testing, a successful prototype was developed. It was given the name "Sun Chips", which had previously been used for a short-lived line of Frito-Lay corn chips introduced in 1976 and discontinued by 1985. The new Sun Chips were first introduced to consumers in the Minneapolis–St. Paul area on October 9, 1989. During the one-year market test in that area, nearly 20 percent of households tried the product at least once, and more than 40 percent of those purchased them again. Additionally, the chips were found to have a higher profit per pound sold than Frito-Lay's other chip products. Sun Chips received a nationwide release in March 1991, after the market test was reportedly so successful that it had to be cut back because demand outpaced the limited supply that Frito-Lay was making.

== Ingredients ==
The ingredients for SunChips Original are:

- Whole corn
- Sunflower and/or canola oil
- Whole wheat
- Brown rice flour
- Whole oat flour
- Sugar
- Salt
- Natural flavor
- Maltodextrin (made from corn)

== Flavors ==
The flavors of Sun Chips that are currently available include Original, Harvest Cheddar, French Onion, Garden Salsa, and Honey BBQ. In 2016, two Veggie Harvest flavors were added, Farmhouse Ranch and Tomato, Basil and Cheese that include vegetables. These were eventually discontinued. Limited edition flavors have included Cinnamon Crunch early in 2007 (the flavor has reappeared since as a seasonal item around the end of the year for the holidays), Honey Graham and Apple 'n Caramel in 2009, and Peppercorn Ranch, which were originally introduced in 2008 and returned for a brief period of time in 2024. Former flavors of Sun Chips include Chili Lime, which was discontinued around the beginning of 2025, Sweet Potato and Brown Sugar, and Sweet and Spicy Barbecue. The Sun Chips Made with Black Beans line, which had both Southwestern Queso and Spicy Jalapeno flavor varieties, were introduced in 2022 and were eventually discontinued.

Internationally, other flavors have been introduced. An example includes bulgogi in South Korea.

== Pork enzymes ==
In the past, some Frito-Lay brand seasoned products, including some flavors of Sun Chips, contained pork enzymes in addition to herbs, cheese, and other seasonings. Frito-Lay's web site states that they use enzymes from pigs (porcine enzymes) in some of their seasoned snack products to develop "unique flavors". The presence of pig-derived ingredients made them haram (forbidden) for Muslims, not kosher for Jews, and not vegetarian. As of April 5, 2011, Frito-Lay's online list "U.S. Products Made Without Pig (Porcine) Enzymes" catalogs nine flavors of Sun Chips "made and distributed in the U.S." that do not contain porcine enzymes.

== Compostable bags ==
In April 2008, Frito Lay introduced compostable packaging for the SunChips product line. The bag was made of plant-based material that would break down within 14 weeks in a hot, active compost pile.

=== Noise complaints ===
In October 2010, Frito-Lay stated that the compostable package would be pulled back in the United States. The bag created excessive noise when held or wrinkled, which led to complaints. In response to various complaints, Frito Lay announced that they would only use the compostable bag for original flavor chips from the SunChips US line moving forward. The other US flavors will use traditional SunChips packaging.

=== Second attempt ===
On February 24, 2011, Frito Lay announced that they were releasing a new, quieter biodegradable bag starting with the Original Sun Chip brand. Closely resembling traditional bags, the compostable packaging uses adhesives sandwiched between the outer and inner layers of the bag to substantially reduce the excessive noise. Current bags are not labeled as compostable, as of 2015.

== Popularity ==
Parent corporation PepsiCo reported that sales of SunChips had declined by double-digit percentages annually from 2011 to 2014. More recent figures in early 2023 have shown the product to have experienced double digit revenue growth.
