= Fritos =

American brand of corn chips and dipping sauces

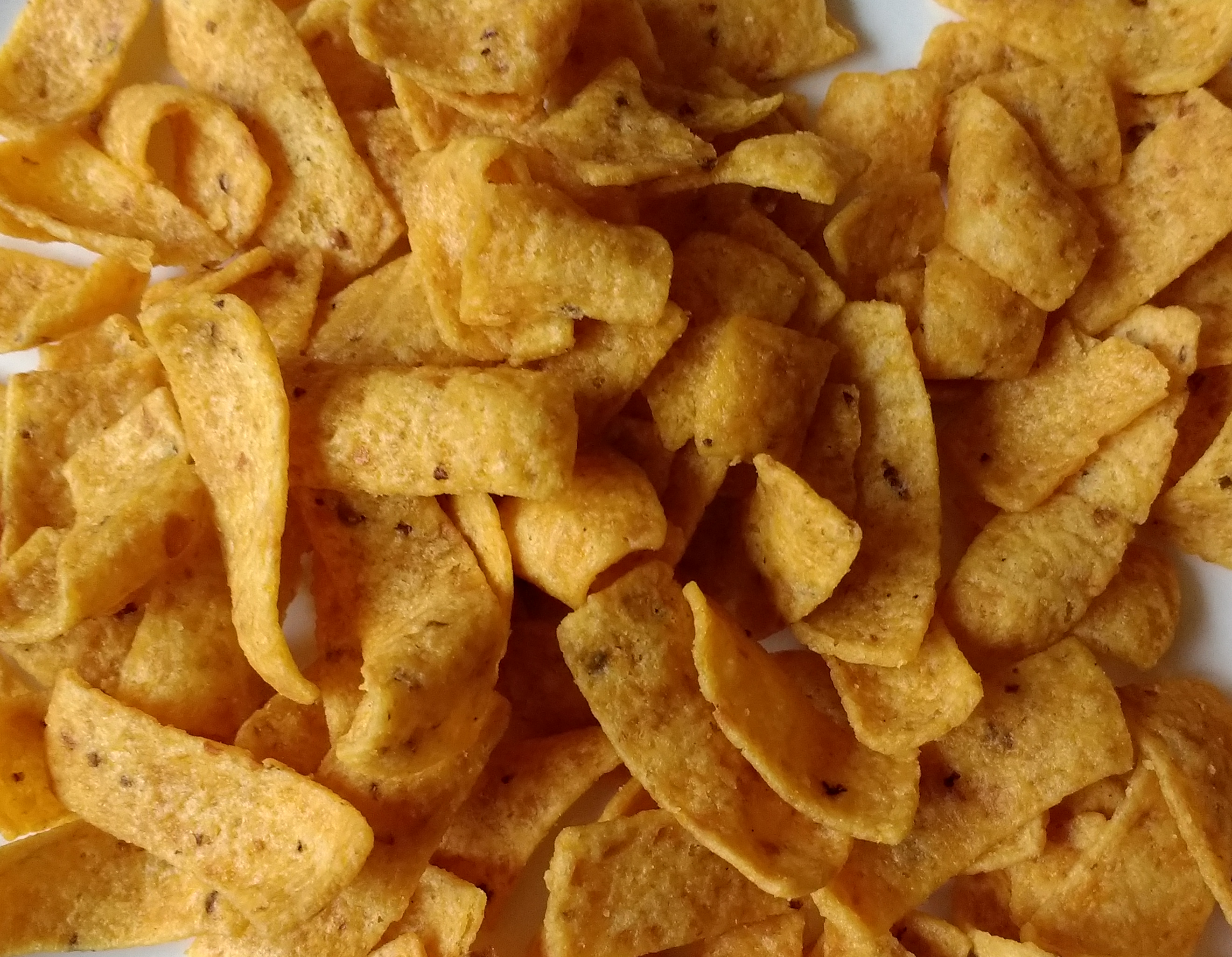
- Bunch of Frito chips
- Product type: Corn chip
- Current owner: PepsiCo (via Frito-Lay)
- Introduced: 1932; 94 years ago
- Related brands: Doritos; Tostitos; Cheetos
- Website: fritos.com

Fritos is an American brand of corn chips, originally a product of the Frito Corporation, which was founded in 1932 by Charles Elmer Doolin. It is now produced by the Frito-Lay division of PepsiCo. Fritos are made by deep-frying extruded whole cornmeal, unlike the similar tortilla chips, which are made from cornmeal and use the nixtamalization process (known as masa). It is one of two brands representing Frito-Lay along with Lay's. The Fritos brand also appears on a line of cheese sauces and bean dip.

== Origins ==
The recipe for the chips now known as Fritos was developed by Gustavo Olguin, a soccer coach from Oaxaca, Mexico, who lived for a time in San Antonio, Texas. In July 1932, wanting to return to Mexico, Olguin took out an advertisement in the San Antonio Express, offering his recipe and equipment for sale. Charles Elmer Doolin, a member of the family that owned San Antonio's Highland Park Confectionary, had recently visited a Mexican restaurant and enjoyed corn chips for the first time. Doolin responded to the advertisement, purchasing Olguin's recipe, his custom potato ricer, and his 19 established retail accounts for $100. The Doolin family gave the chips their name, Frito, the Spanish and Portuguese word for "fried", and founded the Frito Corporation in September 1932.

The Frito Corporation was at first run out of the Doolins' garage; they soon bought the house next door to expand their operation. In 1933–34, they opened plants in Dallas and Tulsa. In 1936, Fritos were displayed at the Texas Centennial Exposition and the exhibit was moved to the 'Castle of Foods' during the 1938 State Fair of Texas. By 1947, the company had plants in Los Angeles and Denver, and licensed franchises nationwide, including H. W. Lay and Company, which had an exclusive franchise to produce and sell Fritos in the Southeastern United States. As its business expanded, the Frito Company also produced other items, including Cheetos (1948), chili, bean dip, tortilla chips, and other Mexican-inspired treats, along with potato chips, roasted peanuts, fried pork skins, and other snack-food products.

By 1955, the company owned more than fifty production plants, including ones in Hawaii and Venezuela, as well as a number of "Frito farms" across Texas, where Doolin grew corn and other crops for use in his products. The Frito Company was one of the first to invest in Disneyland, and from the park's opening in 1955 had a Casa de Fritos Restaurant there. In 1961, the Frito Company merged with H. W. Lay and Company to become Frito-Lay. In 1965, Frito-Lay merged with the Pepsi-Cola Company to become PepsiCo, one of the world's largest producers of soft drinks and snack foods.

According to Smithsonian magazine, C. E. Doolin did not eat meat or salt and was a follower of fellow Texan Herbert M. Shelton, a naturopath who advocated raw foods and fasting as a cure for diseases.

=== Company mascots ===
From 1952 to 1967, the Frito Kid was the company's official mascot, designed by Keitz & Herndon. The Frito Bandito was its mascot from 1967 until about 1971, and was discontinued due to complaints about the racist Mexican Bandito image. He was initially replaced by the Muncha Bunch, a group of cowboys, which then were replaced by W.C. Fritos, modeled after comedian W. C. Fields.

== See also ==
- Frito pie
