= Ruffles (potato chips) =

Brand of potato chip

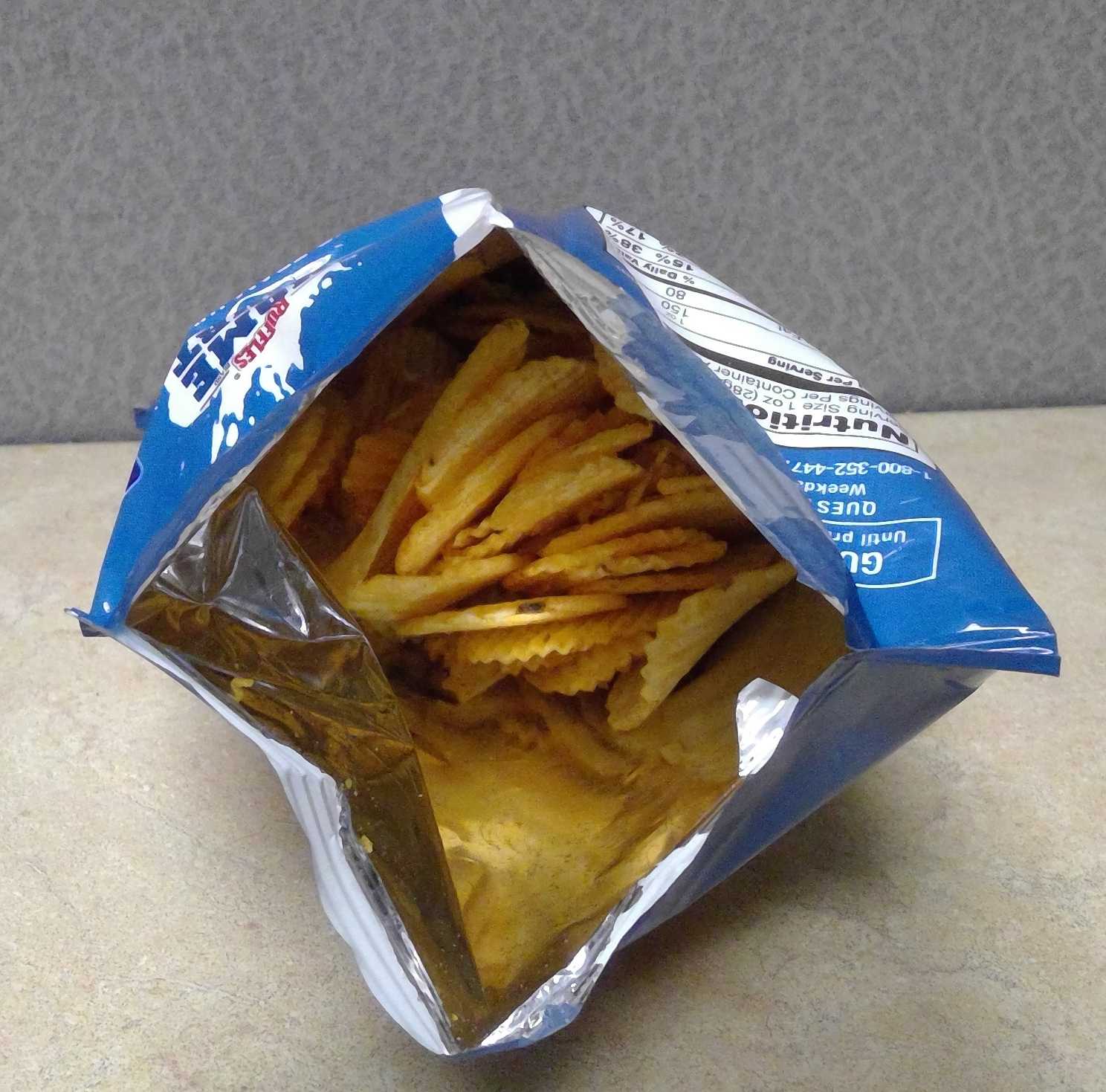
- Opened bag of Ruffles All Dressed potato chips
- Product type: Potato chips
- Current owner: PepsiCo
- Produced by: Frito-Lay
- Country: United States, Canada, United Kingdom, more countries.
- Introduced: 1948; 78 years ago
- Markets: Worldwide
- Previous owners: Bernhardt Stahmer
- Tagline: Ruffles have RRRidges.
- Website: ruffles.com

Ruffles (known as Lays Maxx or Lays Max in some countries, Walkers Max, Walkers Max Double Crunch or Walkers Max Strong for the UK and Ireland markets, and Lays Ondas for Peru) is an American brand of crinkle-cut potato chips. The Frito Company acquired the rights to Ruffles brand potato chips in 1958 from its person of origin Bernhardt Stahmer, who had adopted the trademark on May 11, 1948. Frito merged with H.W. Lay & Co. in 1961 to form Frito-Lay.

Ruffles were introduced in Australia in 1985, after a joint venture between Frito-Lay and Arnott's Snack Foods was formed in 1983. However, they were discontinued in the late 1990s due to shrinking market share. Currently, they are available exclusively at Costco stores in Australia.

== Flavors ==
In addition to regular potato chips, Ruffles are produced in a variety of flavors and presentations, although some of these variants are produced exclusively for regional markets. Current varieties of Ruffles sold in the United States include: original, sour cream & onion, cheddar & sour cream, smokehouse barbecue, flaming hot cheddar and sour cream, flaming hot barbecue, jalapeno ranch, flaming hot, and queso.

In Canada, a unique Ruffles flavor known as All-Dressed, a mix of ketchup, barbecue, and salt & vinegar flavors, is the most popular in the country.

In Mexico, Ruffles have been available in the flavors of jamón, buffalo salsa, and chile con queso. In Brazil, an exclusive onion and parsley flavor is available, as well as other limited flavors like yakisoba, stroganoff, honey mustard, pepperoni, feijoada, burritos, ribs, pizza and lime.

== Marketing ==
In 2013, a mascot was introduced in Brazil in the Ruffles commercials: a potato with pants and sunglasses called Batatito that appeared in commercials aimed at the adult audience. The character was also used in commercials throughout the rest of Latin America. Batatito's last appearance was in 2017 appearing in a commercial for the lime flavor appearing alongside the Pepsi Twist mascots, and also being the only time he appeared on the packaging.

== See also ==
- McCoy's (similar UK product)
- Seabrook (similar UK product)
- List of brand name snack foods
