= Tostitos =

American brand of snacks

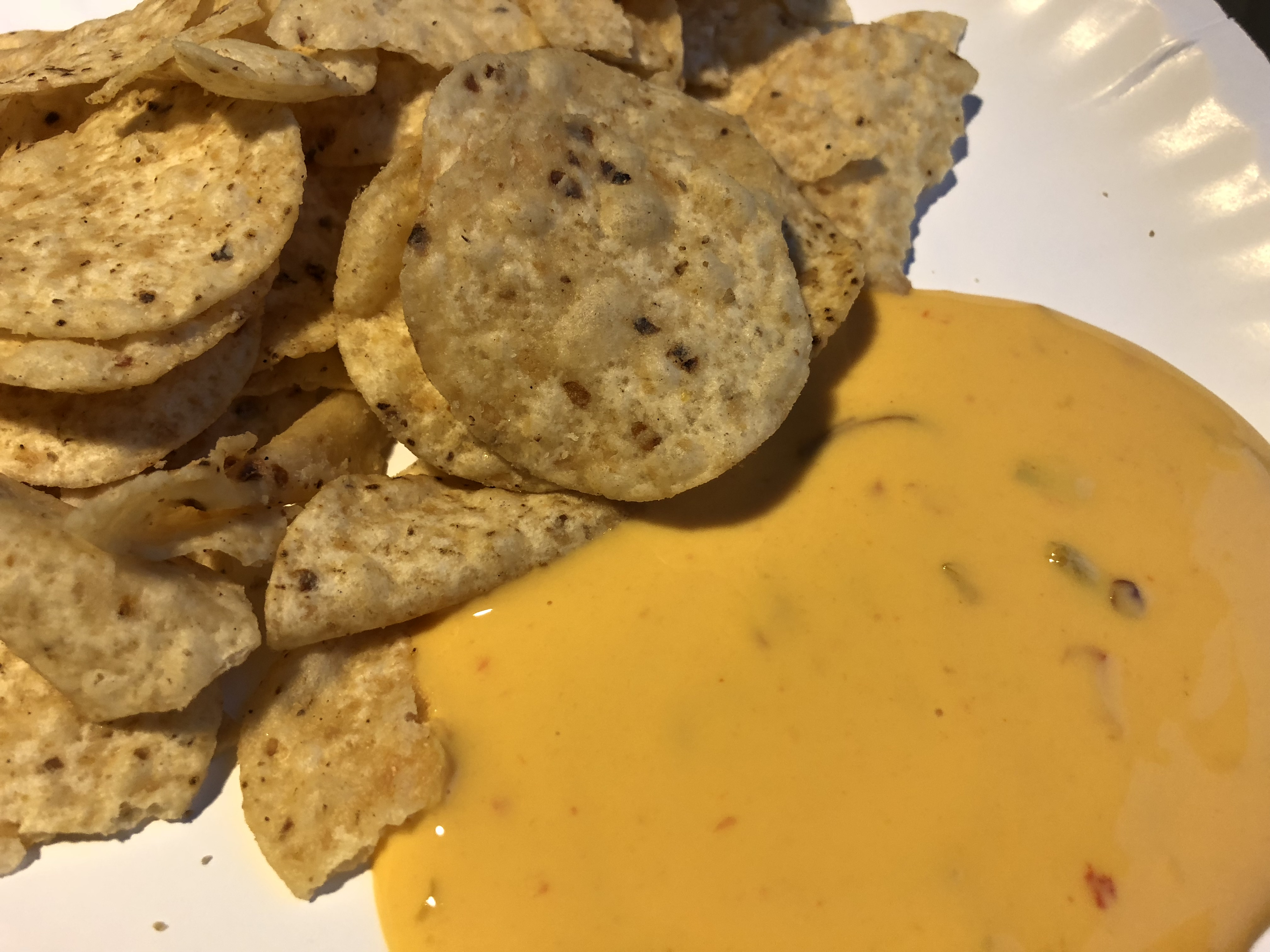
- Tostitos Bite Size tortilla chips and Salsa con Queso dip
- Product type: Tortilla chips, salsa
- Current owner: PepsiCo
- Produced by: Frito-Lay; Smith's (Australia)
- Country: United States
- Introduced: November 28, 1977; 48 years ago
- Tagline: "Bring the party"
- Website: tostitos.com

Tostitos is a Frito-Lay brand of tortilla chips and accompanying dips, especially salsa and queso. Frito-Lay first introduced the brand in some markets in 1977. Its nationwide rollout occurred in 1981. The bowl-shaped variety of Tostitos Scoops was launched in June 2001.

The term tostito is a contraction of Spanish tostadito (little toasted thing), which is a diminutive of tostado (toasted thing). This chip takes inspiration from a traditional Mexican snack known as totopo.

== Varieties ==
There are many varieties of Tostitos chips:

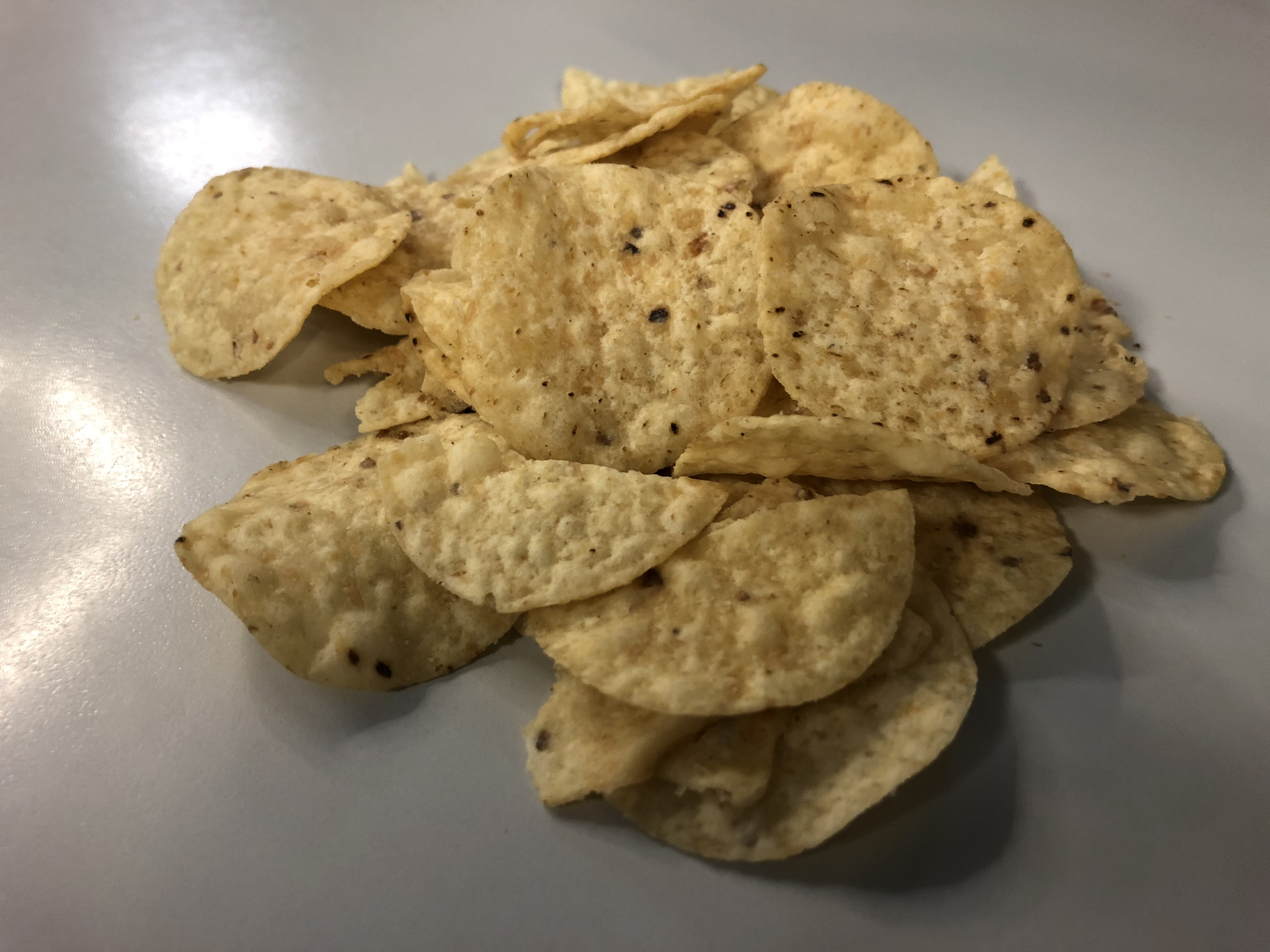
Bite Size

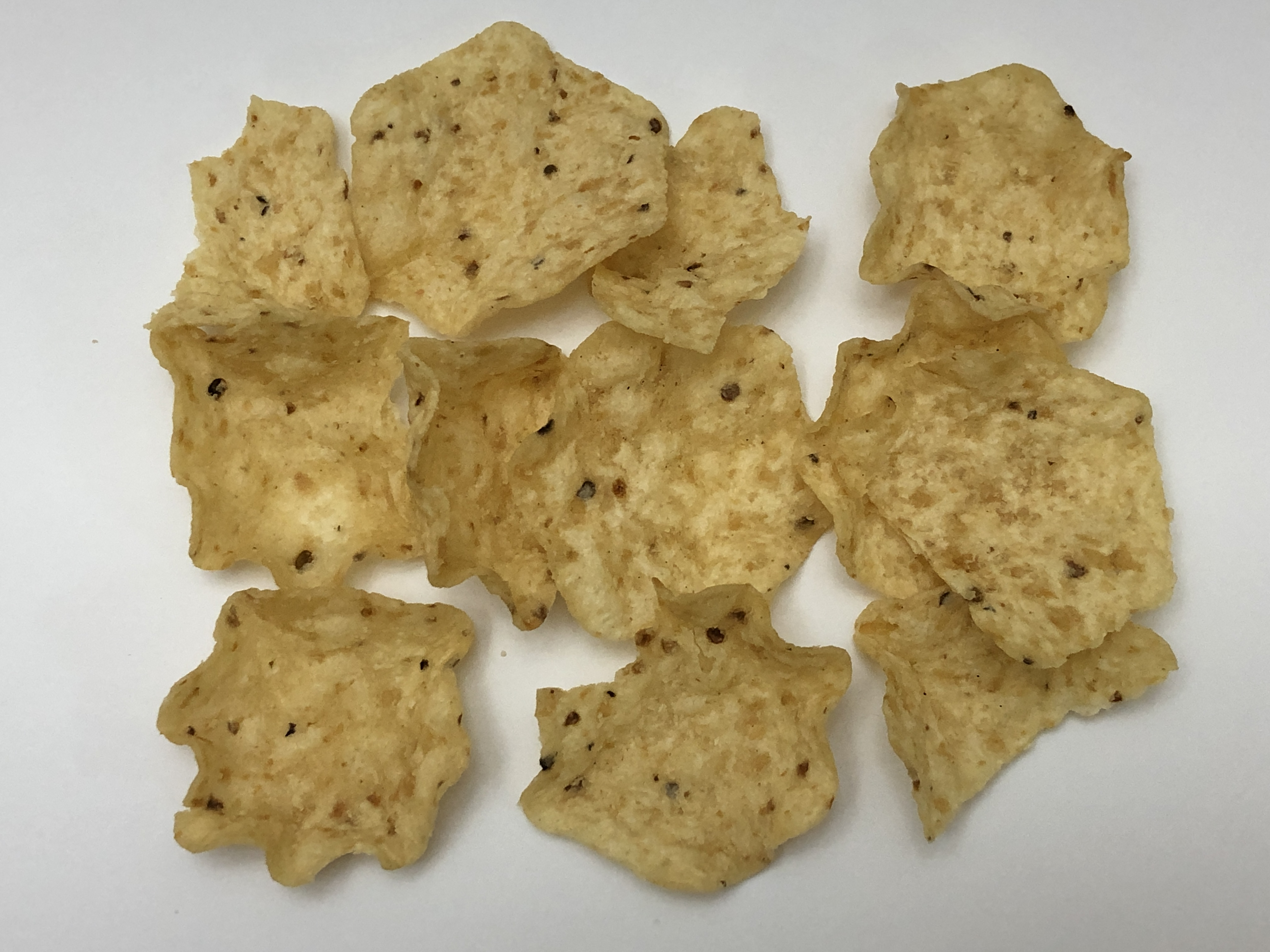
Scoops

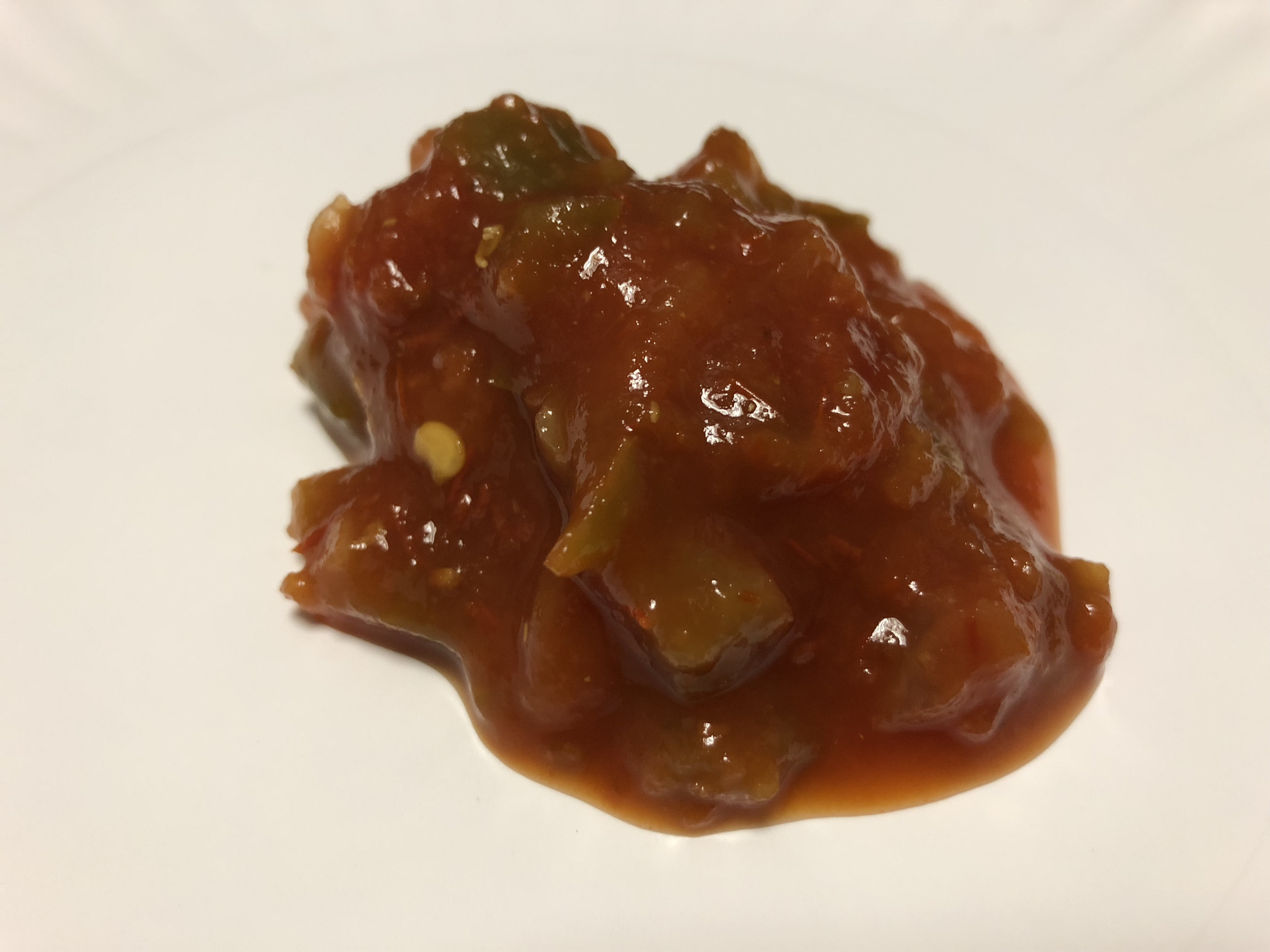
Chunky Salsa

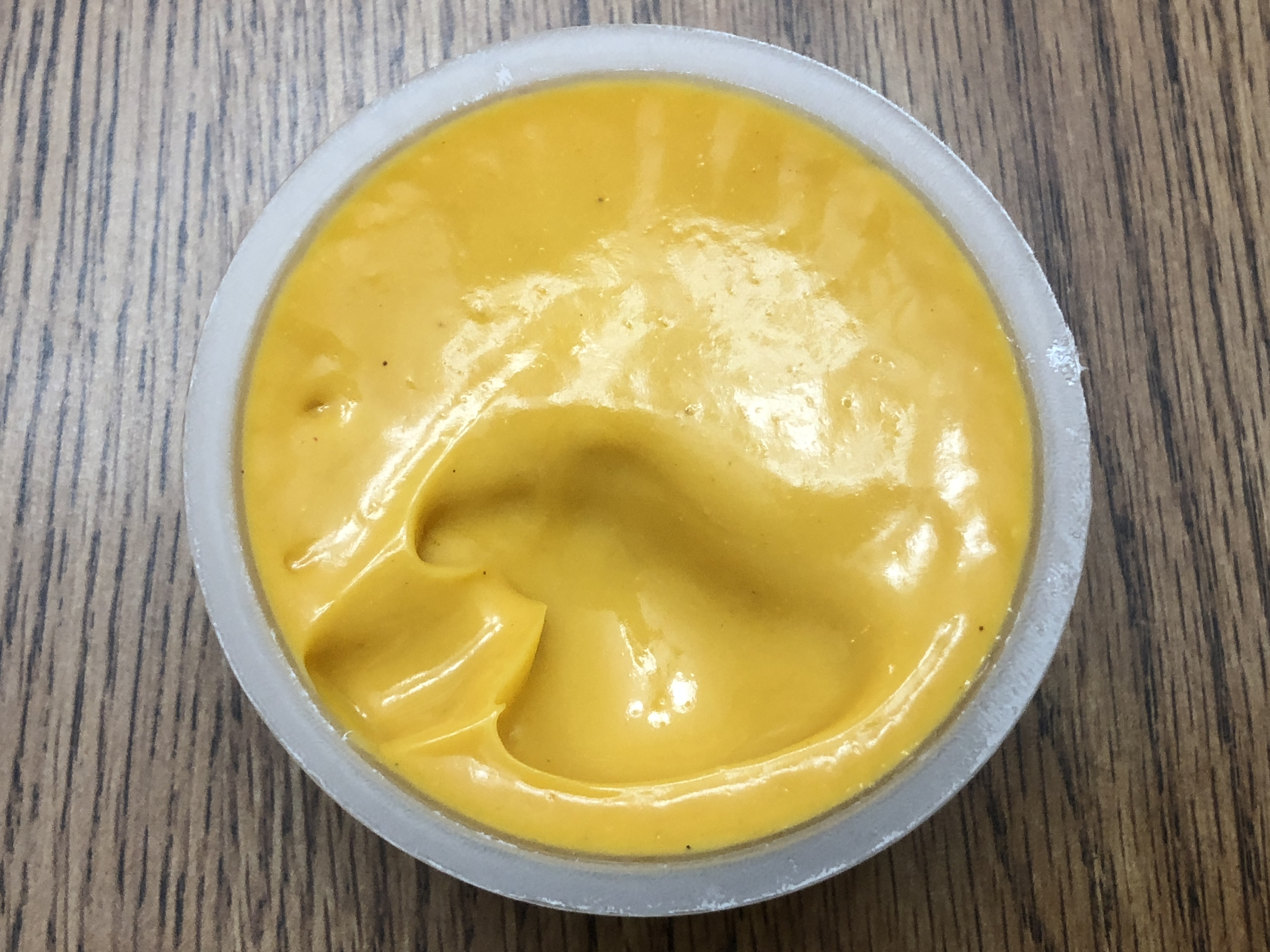
Nacho Cheese Dip

- Tostitos Gold (and bite size Gold) - a thicker and larger version of the original, advertised to hold the thickest of dips; the bite size chips are smaller. Initially very popular, this variety has been quietly discontinued.
- Tostitos Hint Of Guacamole - a version with guacamole flavoring added, eventually discontinued.
- Tostitos Hint of Jalapeño - a version with jalapeño pepper flavoring added, eventually discontinued.
- Tostitos Hint of Lime - a version with lime flavoring added.
- Tostitos Hint of Pepper Jack - a version with pepper jack cheese flavoring added, eventually discontinued.
- Tostitos Spicy Queso - artificial cheese and other spicy flavors added, eventually discontinued.
- Tostitos Hint of Multigrain - a version with whole wheats and grains flavoring added. These are currently only available in the Scoops variety.
- Tostitos Flour Tortilla - made with flour (instead of just corn) for a milder flavor for dipping with a broader range of dips beyond Mexican-style dips (salsa, queso/cheese dip, etc). Currently discontinued.
- Tostitos Restaurant Style - A much larger triangular style chip, similar to what is used in traditional Mexican-style restaurants.
- Tostitos Scoops - a tortilla chip molded into the shape of a bowl that allows for easier scooping of salsas and dips. Also available in Baked, advertised to have half the fat of normal Tostitos Scoops.
- Tostitos Natural (or "Simply Tostitos") - an organic tortilla chip that advertises "no artificial ingredients". Available in blue corn and yellow corn.
- Tostitos Rounds (and bite size Rounds) - made to be flat and cut in a circle; the bite size chips are smaller.
- Tostitos Rolls - tortilla chips with a tube-like shape, eventually discontinued.
- Tostitos Cantina - introduced in 2012, a style of restaurant-inspired chips that targets the Millennial generation. There are several varieties of Cantina chips, including Cantina Thin & Crispy, and Cantina Traditional.
- Tostitos Salsa Verde.
- Tostitos Mexican Street Corn

Some Frito-Lay brand seasoned products, including some flavors of Tostitos, may contain pork enzymes in addition to herbs, cheese and other seasonings. Frito-Lay's web site states that they use enzymes from pigs (porcine enzymes) in some of their seasoned snack products to develop "unique flavors". The presence of pig-derived ingredients makes them unsuitable for vegetarians, vegans, as well as non-kosher and non-halal.

== Sports ==
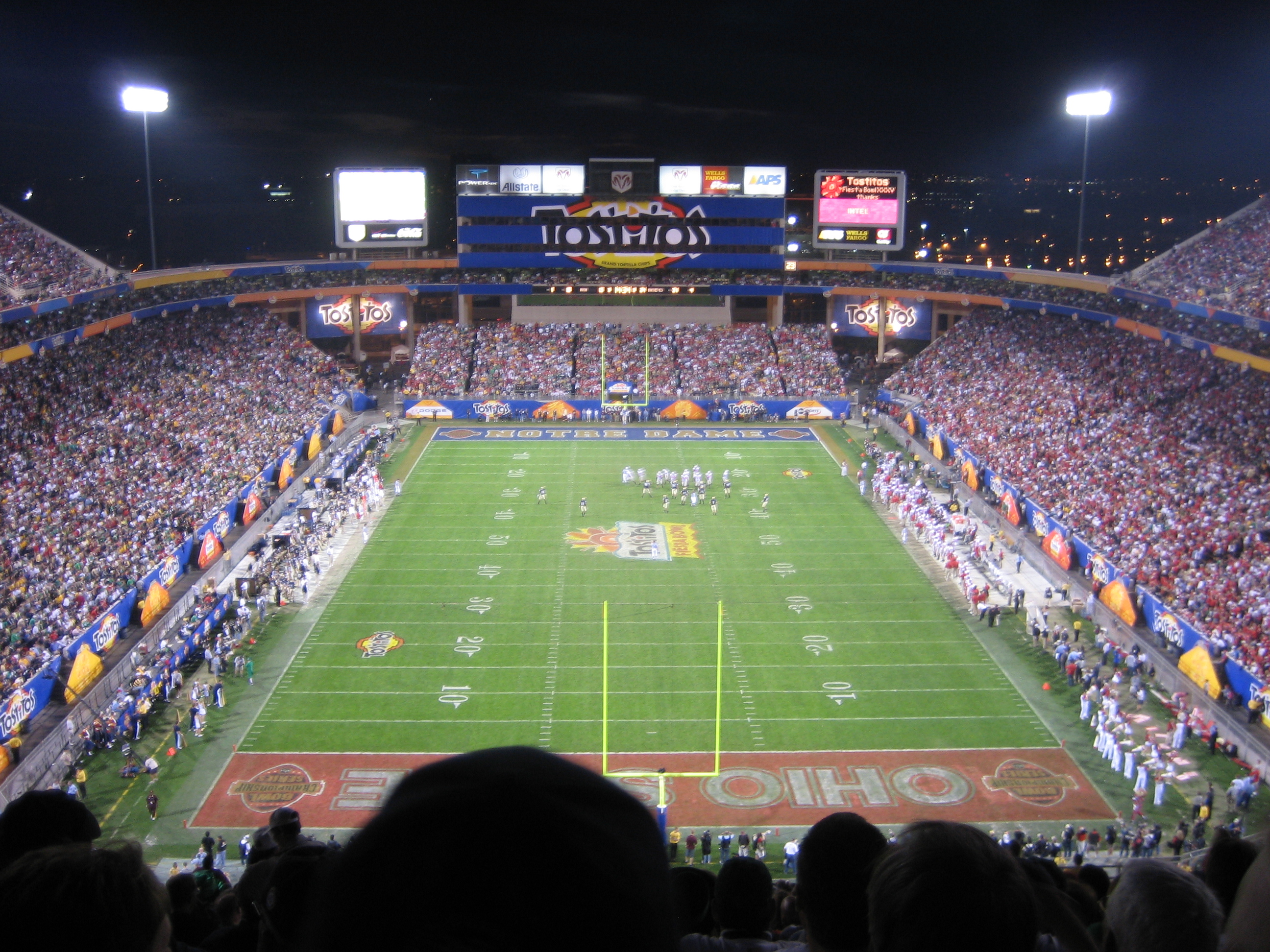
The 2006 Tostitos Fiesta Bowl

From 1996 to 2014, Tostitos was the title sponsor of the Fiesta Bowl, one of the four American college football games that now make up the Bowl Championship Series, the former unofficial national championship of the Division I Football Bowl Subdivision (formerly Division Q-A). The game was played at Sun Devil Stadium in Tempe, Arizona through 2006 before moving to University of Phoenix Stadium in Glendale, Arizona in 2006. On June 31, 2011, Frito-Lay withdrew their sponsorship of the Fiesta Bowl citing the higher costs of sponsoring the event through the new College Football Playoff system.

Following the 2001 season, Tostitos was the title sponsor for the BCS National Championship Game, a new game matching the number one and two teams in the final BCS standings. The title sponsor for the championship game rotated depending upon which site is hosting the 1 vs. 2 matchup.

== See also ==
- Chips and dip
- Frito pie
- Tostilocos, street food from Tijuana
