= PepsiCo =

American multinational food and beverage corporation

PepsiCo, Inc.
- Logo used since 2025

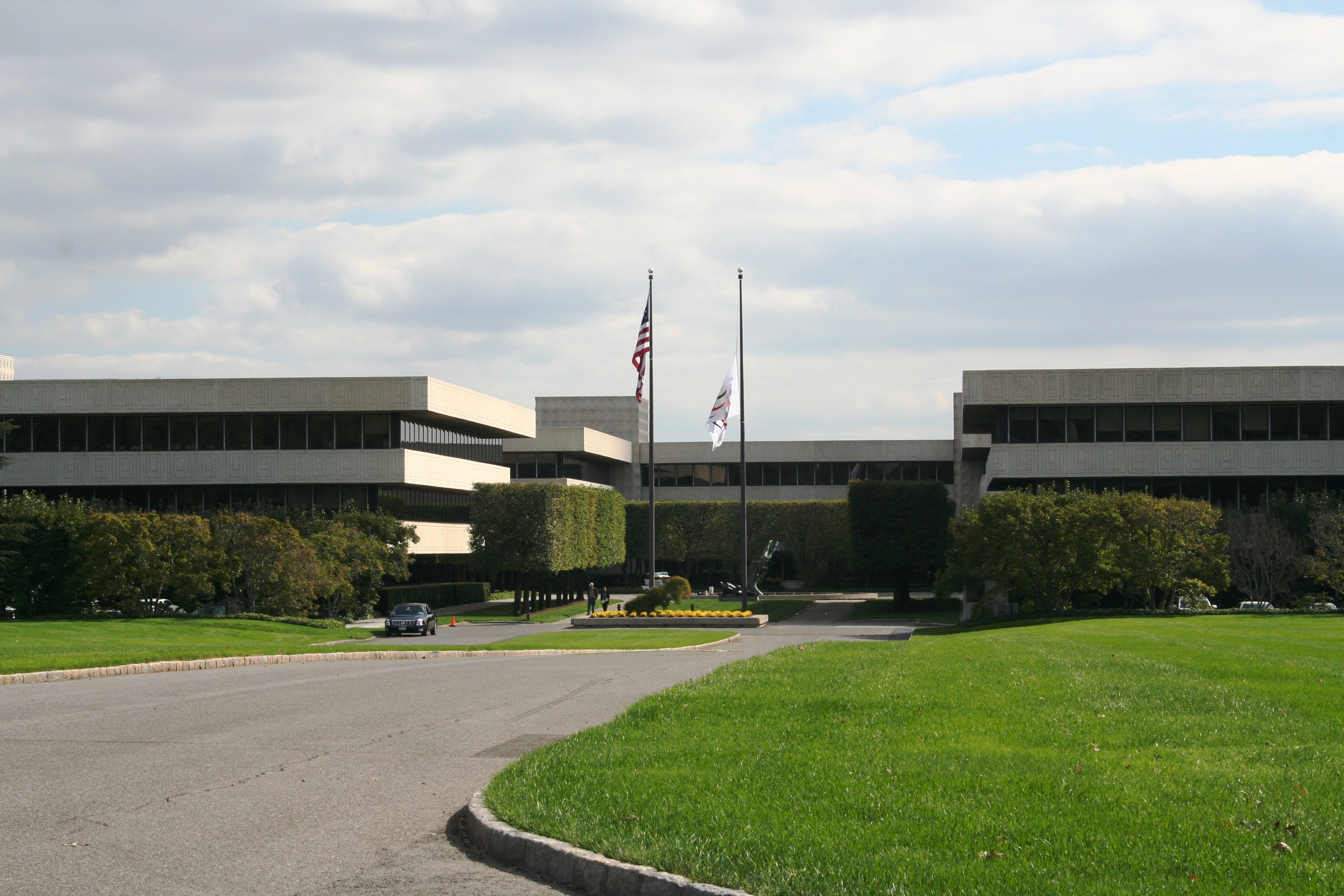
- PepsiCo's global headquarters in Harrison, New York
- Trade name: PepsiCo
- Type: Public
- Traded as: Nasdaq: PEP; Nasdaq-100 component; S&P 100 component; S&P 500 component
- Industry: Beverages; Food processing
- Predecessors: Pepsi-Cola Company; Frito-Lay, Inc.
- Founded: December 24, 1902; 123 years ago; New Bern, North Carolina, U.S. (as the Pepsi-Cola Company); June 8, 1965; 61 years ago; (as PepsiCo)
- Founder: Caleb Bradham (for the Pepsi-Cola Company branch)
- Headquarters: Harrison, New York, U.S.
- Area served: Worldwide
- Key people: Ramón Laguarta (chairman & CEO); Jamie Caulfield (EVP and CFO)
- Brands: List of PepsiCo brands
- Revenue: ▲US$93.9 billion (FY25)
- Operating income: ▼US$11.50 billion (FY25)
- Net income: ▼US$8.24 billion (FY25)
- Total assets: ▲US$107.4 billion (FY25)
- Total equity: ▲US$20.5 billion (FY25)
- Number of employees: ▼306,000 (FY25)
- Subsidiaries: List of subsidiaries
- Website: pepsico.com

PepsiCo, Inc. is an American multinational food and beverage corporation headquartered in Harrison, New York, in the hamlet of Purchase. PepsiCo's business encompasses all aspects of the food and beverage market. It oversees the manufacturing, distribution, and marketing of its products. PepsiCo was formed in 1965 with the merger of the Pepsi-Cola Company and Frito-Lay, Inc., PepsiCo has since expanded from its namesake product Pepsi to a diversified range of food and beverage brands. Significant acquisitions include Tropicana Products in 1998, the Quaker Oats Company in 2001, which added the Gatorade brand to the Pepsi portfolio, and Pioneer Foods in 2020 for US$1.7 billion.

As of January 2021, the company possesses 23 brands that each have over $1 billion in sales annually. PepsiCo products were distributed across more than 200 countries and territories, resulting in annual net revenues of over US$70 billion. PepsiCo is the second-largest food and beverage business in the world based on net revenue, profit, and market capitalization, behind Nestlé. In 2023, the company's seat in the Forbes Global 2000 was 82. PepsiCo's flagship product, Pepsi Cola, has been engaged in a rivalry for generations with Coca-Cola; it is commonly referred to as the cola wars. Although Coca-Cola outsells Pepsi Cola in the United States, PepsiCo within the North American market is the largest food and beverage company by net revenue. The company's beverage distribution and bottling is conducted by PepsiCo as well as by licensed bottlers in certain regions.

PepsiCo has received criticism over poor working conditions, contributing to deforestation, use of genetically modified ingredients, significant water usage, presence of pesticide residue in products, contributing to global plastic pollution, significant carbon dioxide emissions, and poor product nutrition. In 2024, PepsiCo was the second-highest producer of branded plastic pollution globally.

== History ==
=== Origins ===
The soft drink Pepsi was developed by Caleb Bradham, a pharmacist and businessman from Duplin County, North Carolina. He coined the name "Pepsi-Cola" in 1898, marketing the drink from his pharmacy in New Bern, North Carolina. The name reflects the effects of enzyme Pepsin which helps in digestion. As his drink gained popularity Bradham founded the Pepsi-Cola Company in 1902 and registered a patent for his recipe in 1903. The company was incorporated under Delaware General Corporation Law in 1919. Bradham's company experienced years of success leading up to World War I. However, sugar rationing during the war and a volatile sugar market in the war's aftermath damaged the company's financial health to such a degree that in 1923, Bradham declared bankruptcy and returned to running pharmacies in North Carolina.

Namesake brand Pepsi and Lay's are two of PepsiCo's flagship brands.

On June 8, 1923, the company trademark and secret recipe were purchased by Craven Holding Corporation. In 1931, Roy Megargel, a Wall Street broker, purchased the Pepsi trademark, business, and goodwill from Craven Holding in association with Charles Guth. Guth was also the president of Loft, Incorporated, a leading candy manufacturer based in Long Island City, New York. Loft ran a network with 115 stores across the Mid-Atlantic at the time of Guth's acquisition. Guth used Loft's labs and chemists to reformulate the Pepsi syrup recipe, and he used his position as president of the company to replace Coca-Cola with Pepsi Cola at Loft's shops and restaurants. Guth also used Loft resources to promote Pepsi, and moved the soda company to a location close to Loft's own facilities in New York City.

In 1935, the shareholders of Loft sued Guth for his 91% stake of Pepsi-Cola Company in the landmark case Guth v. Loft Inc. Loft won the suit and on May 29, 1941, formally absorbed Pepsi into Loft, which was then re-branded as Pepsi-Cola Company that same year. Loft restaurants and candy stores were spun off at that time.

In the early 1960s, Pepsi-Cola's product lines expanded with the creation of Diet Pepsi and purchase of Mountain Dew. In 1965, the Pepsi-Cola Company merged with Frito-Lay, Inc. to become PepsiCo, Inc. At the time of its foundation, PepsiCo was incorporated under Delaware General Corporation Law and headquartered in Manhattan, New York. The company's headquarters were relocated to the present location of Purchase, New York in 1970, and in 1986 PepsiCo was reincorporated in the state of North Carolina.

=== Acquisitions and divestments ===
Between the late-1970s and the mid-1990s, PepsiCo expanded via acquisition of businesses outside of its core focus of packaged food and beverage brands; however it exited these non-core business lines largely in 1997, selling some, and spinning off others into a new company named Tricon Global Restaurants, which later became known as Yum! Brands, Inc. PepsiCo also previously owned several other brands that it later sold so it could focus on its primary snack food and beverage lines, according to investment analysts reporting on the divestments in 1997. Brands formerly owned by PepsiCo include: Pizza Hut, Taco Bell, KFC, Hot 'n Now, East Side Mario's, D'Angelo Sandwich Shops, Chevys Fresh Mex, California Pizza Kitchen, Stolichnaya (via licensed agreement), Wilson Sporting Goods, and North American Van Lines.

The divestments concluding in 1997 were followed by multiple large-scale acquisitions, as PepsiCo began to extend its operations beyond soft drinks and snack foods into other lines of foods and beverages. PepsiCo purchased the orange juice company Tropicana Products in 1998, and merged with Quaker Oats Company in 2001, adding with it the Gatorade sports drink line and other Quaker Oats brands such as Chewy Granola Bars and Aunt Jemima, among others.

In August 2009, PepsiCo made a US$7 billion offer to acquire the two largest bottlers of its products in North America: Pepsi Bottling Group and PepsiAmericas. This acquisition was completed in 2010, resulting in the formation of a new wholly owned subsidiary of PepsiCo, Pepsi Beverages Company.

In February 2011, the company made its largest international acquisition by purchasing a two-thirds (majority) stake in Wimm-Bill-Dann Foods, a Russian food company that produces milk, yogurt, fruit juices, and dairy products. When it acquired the remaining 23% stake of Wimm-Bill-Dann Foods in October 2011, PepsiCo became the largest food and beverage company in Russia.

In July 2012, PepsiCo announced a joint venture with the Theo Muller Group, which was named Muller Quaker Dairy. This marked PepsiCo's first entry into the dairy space in the U.S. The joint venture was dissolved in December 2015.

On December 20, 2017, PepsiCo moved its shares to Nasdaq after trading 39 years on the New York Stock Exchange.

On May 25, 2018, PepsiCo announced that it would acquire fruit and vegetable snack maker Bare Foods. It started quarter-owning allMotti in late November 2018 and was PepsiCo's first owned Tech and Computer Service company.

On August 20, 2018, PepsiCo announced that it had entered into agreement to acquire SodaStream. The purchase was completed in December 2018 as part of a strategic plan to steer Pepsi toward offering healthier products.

In February 2019, PepsiCo acquired British crisp manufacturer Pipers Crisps following approval from the Competition and Markets Authority. The purchase price was undisclosed, but was reported to be approximately £20 million.

In April 2019, PepsiCo India sued four small farmers in Gujarat for intellectual property infringement, claiming they were growing the FC5 potato variety—used for production of Lay's—which the company had exclusive plant breeders' rights under the Protection of Plant Varieties and Farmers' Rights Act, 2001. The company offered to settle if the farmers joined their potato farming program or stopped growing FC5 potatoes. Later, in May, the company withdrew the lawsuits after discussions with the Indian government and pressure from activists.

On October 3, 2019, PepsiCo announced that they would leave Indonesia after terminating their partnership with local distributor PT Anugerah Indofood Barokah Makmur (AIBM). Both companies stopped production of PepsiCo products on October 10. This has resulted in KFC and Pizza Hut chains in the country to switch to Coca-Cola products.

On December 2, 2019, PepsiCo acquired the snacks brand, BFY Brands, who were then folded into the Frito-Lay division.

In March 2020, PepsiCo announced that it had entered into agreement to acquire Rockstar Energy for US$3.85 billion.

In January 2021, as a plan to fight global warming, PepsiCo announced that it is planning to achieve net zero greenhouse gas emissions by 2040, knowing that it had already started generating about 57 million metric tonnes of greenhouse gas emissions globally in 2019.

On August 3, 2021, PepsiCo announced that it has agreed to sell a majority stake in Tropicana, Naked and other North American juice brands to French private equity firm PAI Partners for US$3.3 billion, so that the company can concentrate on its healthy snack food business. Pepsi will hold a 39% stake in the joint venture as well as having exclusive rights to the brand in the USA.

In December 2021, PepsiCo India had its registration of the FC5 potato variety revoked by the Protection of Plant Varieties and Farmers' Rights Authority after a petition by Kavitha Kuruganti, a farmers' rights activist. PepsiCo India appealed to the Delhi High Court for reinstatement of the registration, which was initially dismissed in July 2023. However, on second appeal to the same court, the registration was reinstated in January 2024.

In August 2022, PepsiCo acquired a $550 million stake in the energy drink maker Celsius.

On October 1, 2024, PepsiCo announced that it would acquire Siete Foods for $1.2 billion. The acquisition was completed on January 17, 2025.

In March 2025, PepsiCo announced it is buying prebiotic soda brand Poppi for more than $1.6 billion.

On December 8, 2025, PepsiCo announced that it would be cutting nearly 20% of its U.S. product lineup by early 2026 as part of a deal with activist investor Elliott Investment Management to simplify its portfolio and focus on core brands, and lower prices to boost sales. 3 manufacturing plants would be shuttered, production lines would be shut down, and an unspecified number of employees would be laid off.

== Business divisions ==
The structure of PepsiCo's global operations has shifted multiple times in its history as a result of international expansion, and as of December 2021 it is separated into seven main divisions: PepsiCo Beverages North America (PBNA); Frito-Lay North America (FLNA); Quaker Foods North America (QFNA); Latin America; Europe; Africa, Middle East and South Asia (AMESA); and Asia–Pacific, Australia, New Zealand and China (APAC). As of 2015, 73 percent of the company's net revenues came from North and South America; 17 percent from Europe and Sub-Saharan Africa; and 10 percent from Asia, the Middle East, and Africa. PepsiCo and its combined subsidiaries employed approximately 263,000 people worldwide as of December 2015.

=== PepsiCo Beverages North America ===
This division contributed 35 percent of PepsiCo's net revenue as of 2015, and involves the manufacture (and in some cases licensing), marketing and sales of both carbonated and non-carbonated beverages in North America. The main brands distributed under this division include Pepsi, Mountain Dew, Gatorade, 7 Up (outside the U.S.), Starry, SoBe Lifewater, AMP Energy, Naked Juice, and Izze. Aquafina, the company's bottled water brand, is also marketed and licensed through North America Beverages. In 2015, PepsiCo also introduced Stubborn Soda, a line of carbonated beverages without high fructose corn syrup.

PepsiCo also has formed partnerships with several beverage brands it does not own, in order to distribute or market them with its own brands. As of 2010, its partnerships include: Starbucks (Frappuccino, DoubleShot, and Iced Coffee), Unilever's Lipton licensed brands (Lipton Brisk and Lipton Iced Tea), and Dole (licensed juices and drinks).

=== Frito-Lay North America ===
Frito-Lay North America, the result of a merger in 1961 between the Frito Company and the H.W. Lay Company, produces the top-selling line of snack foods in the U.S. Its main brands in the U.S., Canada, and Mexico include Lay's and Ruffles potato chips; Doritos tortilla chips; Tostitos tortilla chips and dips; Cheetos cheese flavored snacks; Fritos corn chips; Rold Gold pretzels; Sun Chips; and Cracker Jack popcorn. Products made by this division are sold to independent distributors and retailers, and are transported from Frito-Lay's manufacturing plants to distribution centers, principally in vehicles owned and operated by the company.

The division contributed 23 percent of PepsiCo's net revenue in 2015. Until November 2009, Christopher Furman, President of Ventura Foods Inc., occupied the position of Food Services CEO.

In the second half of 2023, Frito-Lay, as part of the PepsiCo Positive initiative, will ship more than 700 electric vehicles (EV) to the US. The company predicts that this measure will reduce greenhouse gas emissions by 7,000 metric tons. Previous measures from the company were: order 100 Tesla Semi trucks, 30 of which have already been received, 40 Ford eTransit trucks for the Dallas - Fort Worth area, as well as the use of renewable energy storage, BYD electric yard tractors, Tesla Semis and Peterbilt electric trucks at a factory in Modesto, California.

=== Quaker Foods North America ===
Quaker Foods North America, created following PepsiCo's acquisition of the Quaker Oats Company in 2001, manufactures, markets, and sells Quaker Oatmeal, Rice-A-Roni, Cap'n Crunch, and Life cereals, as well as Near East side dishes within North America. This division also owns and produces the Pearl Milling Company brand, which as of 2009 was the top-selling line of syrups and pancake mixes within this region.

Sabritas and Gamesa are two of PepsiCo's food business lines headquartered in Mexico; they were acquired in 1966 and 1990, respectively. Sabritas markets Frito-Lay products in Mexico, including local brands such as Poffets, Rancheritos, Crujitos, and Sabritones. Gamesa is the largest manufacturer of cookies in Mexico, distributing brands such as Emperador, Arcoiris and Marías Gamesa.

The division contributed 4 percent of PepsiCo's net revenues in 2015.

=== Latin America ===
PepsiCo's Latin America Foods (Spanish: Snacks América Latina) operations market and sell primarily Quaker- and Frito-Lay/Sabritas/Elma Chips-branded snack foods within Mexico, Central and South America, including Argentina, Brazil, Peru, and other countries in this region. Snacks América Latina purchased Peruvian company Karinto S.A.C. including its production company Bocaditas Nacionales (with three production facilities in Peru) from the Hayashida family of Lima in 2009, adding the Karito brand to its product line, including Cuates, Fripapas, and Papi Frits.

The company started a new market strategy to sell its Pepsi Cola product in Mexico, stating that about one-third of the population has difficulty pronouncing "Pepsi". With manufacture and sales of its product under the label 'Pécsi', the advertisement campaign features the Mexican soccer celebrity Cuauhtémoc Blanco. In 2009, PepsiCo had previously used the same strategy successfully in Argentina.

Pepsico will market and distribute Starbucks products in several Latin American countries for 2016.

The division contributed 13 percent of PepsiCo's net revenues in 2015.

=== Europe ===
PepsiCo began to expand its distribution in Europe in the 1980s, and in 2015, it made up 17 percent of the company's global net revenue. Unlike PepsiCo's Americas business segments, both foods and beverages are manufactured and marketed under one umbrella division in this region, known as PepsiCo Europe. The primary brands sold by PepsiCo in Europe include Pepsi-Cola beverages, Frito-Lay snacks, Tropicana juices, and Quaker food products, as well as regional brands unique to Europe such as Walkers crisps, Copella, Paw Ridge, Snack-a-Jack, Duyvis, and others. PepsiCo also produces and distributes the soft drink 7UP in Europe via a license agreement. PepsiCo has three sites in South Africa (Isando, Parrow, and Prospecton) which produce Lay's and Simba chips.

PepsiCo's European presence expanded in Russia in 2009 as the company announced a US$1B investment, and with its acquisition of Russian juice and dairy product brand Wimm-Bill-Dann Foods in December 2010 and Lebedyansky juice producer in March 2008. According to Reuters, "PepsiCo reported that in 2017, its Russian operations generated net revenue of US$3.23 billion, which made up 5.1 percent of the company's total net revenue." Following the 2022 Russian invasion of Ukraine, a number of companies faced growing pressure to halt operations in Russia after not initially doing so.

On March 8, 2022, PepsiCo announced in a letter from CEO Laguarta the "suspension of the sale of Pepsi-Cola ... our global beverage brands in Russia, including 7 Up and Mirinda ... [and] capital investments and all advertising and promotional activities in Russia." However, PepsiCo maintained it had a "responsibility" to continue to sell "milk and other dairy offerings, baby formula and baby food", and that "[b]y continuing to operate, we will also continue to support the livelihoods of our 20,000 Russian associates and the 40,000 Russian agricultural workers in our supply chain". In July 2022, it was announced that PepsiCo will rebrand its products in Russia to PepsiCo Russian brands such as Evervess and Frustyle, in response to the Russian invasion. In September 2023, the Ukrainian National Agency on Corruption Prevention listed PepsiCo as a "war sponsor" for continuing to operate in Russia and, in particular, paying taxes.

=== Africa, Middle East and South Asia (AMESA) ===
The AMESA sector consists of the Africa, Middle East and South Asia regions, and features many leading global and local snack brands including Lay's, Cheetos, and Doritos, along with local favorites such as Chipsy (Egypt), Simba (South Africa) and Kurkure (India and Pakistan), as well as various beverage brands including 7UP, Pepsi, Aquafina, Mtn Dew, Mirinda, and Sting. The AMESA sector covers a wide span of developing and emerging markets, including the key countries of Egypt, India, Saudi Arabia, Pakistan and South Africa. In 2020, PepsiCo acquired Pioneer Foods, a leading food and beverage company in South Africa, adding its robust, well-known brands including Weet-Bix, Bokomo and Ceres to PepsiCo's portfolio. The Pioneer Foods acquisition is key to PepsiCo's growth strategy across the entire African continent.

In addition to the production and sales of several worldwide Pepsi-Cola, Quaker Foods, and Frito-Lay beverage and food product lines (including Pepsi and Doritos), this segment of PepsiCo's business markets regional brands such as Mirinda, Kurkure, and Red Rock Deli, among others. While PepsiCo owns its own manufacturing and distribution facilities in certain parts of these regions, more of this production is conducted via alternate means such as licensing (which it does with Aquafina), contract manufacturing, joint ventures, and affiliate operations. PepsiCo's businesses in these regions, as of 2015, contributed 10 percent to the company's net revenue worldwide.

In 1992, the Pepsi Number Fever marketing campaign in the Philippines accidentally distributed 800,000 winning bottle caps for a 1 million peso grand prize, leading to riots and the deaths of five people.

In August 2012, PepsiCo signed an agreement with a local Myanmar distributor to sell its soft drinks after a 15-year break to re-enter the country.

SodaStream, which PepsiCo acquired in 2018, is based in Israel, while Sabra (which PepsiCo co-owns with the Israeli food conglomerate Strauss Group) holds a 60% market share for hummus sales in the United States as of 2015. The Strauss Group produces and distributes Frito-Lay products in Israel.

In May 2026, PepsiCo announced plans to invest ₹5,700 crore in India by 2030 to expand its food and beverage manufacturing operations, supply chain infrastructure, and product portfolio in the country.

=== Asia Pacific, Australia, New Zealand and China (APAC) ===
In 1998 PepsiCo purchased Smith's Snackfood Company from United Biscuits. In 2006 PepsiCo purchased Bluebird Foods from Burns Philp. PepsiCo Indonesia started production in a plant at Cikarang, Indonesia in March 2025.

== Corporate governance ==
Headquartered in Harrison, New York, in the hamlet of Purchase, with research and development headquarters in Valhalla, New York, PepsiCo's Chairman and CEO is Ramón Laguarta. The board of directors is composed of eleven outside directors as of 2010, including Ray Lee Hunt, Shona Brown, Victor Dzau, Arthur C. Martinez, Sharon Percy Rockefeller, Daniel Vasella, Dina Dublon, Ian M. Cook, Alberto Ibargüen, and Lloyd G. Trotter. Former top executives at PepsiCo include Steven Reinemund, Roger Enrico, D. Wayne Calloway, John Sculley, Michael H. Jordan, Donald M. Kendall, Christopher A. Sinclair, Irene Rosenfeld, David C. Novak, Brenda C. Barnes, and Alfred Steele.

On October 1, 2006, former Chief Financial Officer and President Indra Nooyi replaced Steve Reinemund as chief executive officer. Nooyi remained as the corporation's president, and became Chairman of the Board in May 2007, later (in 2010) being named No.1 on Fortune's list of the "50 Most Powerful Women" and No.6 on Forbes' list of the "World's 100 Most Powerful Women". PepsiCo received a 100 percent rating on the Corporate Equality Index released by the LGBT-advocate group Human Rights Campaign starting in 2004, the third year of the report.

In November 2014, the firm's president Zein Abdalla announced he would be stepping down from his position at the firm by the end of 2014. In 2017, Ramón Laguarta became the president and became its CEO in 2018.

=== Ownership ===
The 10 largest shareholders of PepsiCo as of December 2023 were:

- The Vanguard Group (9.35%)
- BlackRock (7.96%)
- State Street Corporation (4.20%)
- Geode Capital Management (2.01%)
- Morgan Stanley (1.78%)
- Bank of America (1.66%)
- JPMorgan Chase (1.52%)
- Charles Schwab (1.35%)
- Northern Trust (1.16%)
- Norges Bank (1.13%)

=== Headquarters ===
The PepsiCo headquarters are located in the hamlet of Purchase, New York, in the town and village of Harrison, New York. It was one of the last architectural works by Edward Durell Stone. It consists of seven three-story buildings. Each building is connected to its neighbor through a corner. The property includes the Donald M. Kendall Sculpture Gardens with 45 contemporary sculptures open to the public. Works include those of Alexander Calder, Henry Moore, and Auguste Rodin. Westchester Magazine stated "The buildings' square blocks rise from the ground into low, inverted ziggurats, with each of the three floors having strips of dark windows; patterned pre-cast concrete panels add texture to the exterior surfaces." In 2010 the magazine ranked the building as one of the ten most beautiful buildings in Westchester County.

During the 1960s, PepsiCo had its headquarters in 500 Park Avenue in Midtown Manhattan, New York City. In 1956 PepsiCo paid US$2 million for the previous building at the site. PepsiCo built 500 Park Avenue in 1960. In 1966, Mayor of New York City John Lindsay started a private campaign to convince PepsiCo to remain in New York City. Six months later, the company announced that it was moving to 112 acres (45 ha) on the Blind Brook Polo Club in Purchase.

=== Charitable activities ===
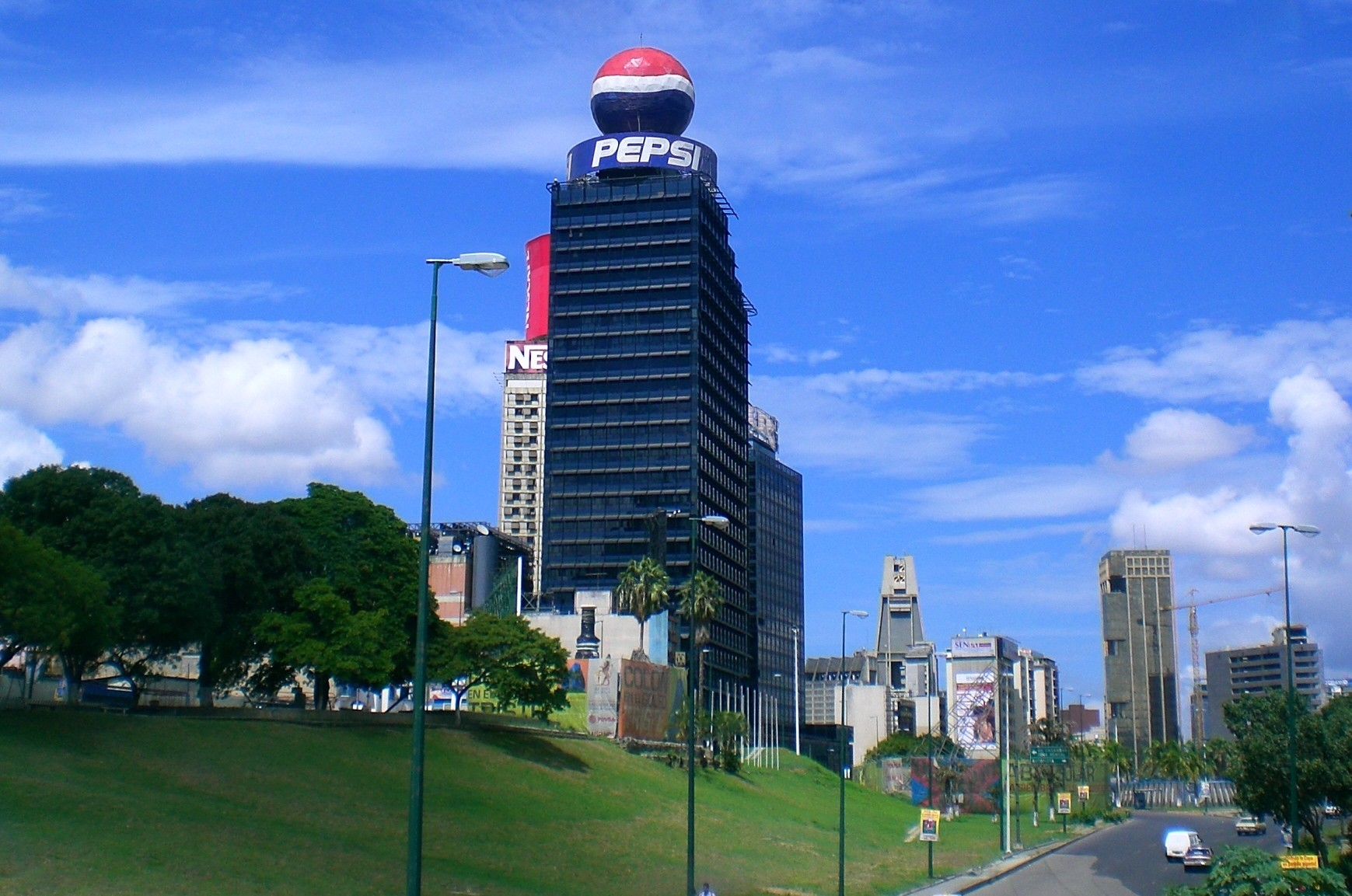
Billboard of Pepsi-Cola in Venezuela (ES)

PepsiCo has maintained a philanthropic program since 1962 called the PepsiCo Foundation, in which it primarily funds "nutrition and activity, safe water and water usage efficiencies, and education", according to the foundation's website. In 2009, US$27.9 million was contributed through this foundation, including grants to the United Way and YMCA, among others.

In 2009, PepsiCo launched an initiative called the Pepsi Refresh Project, For the first time in 23 years, PepsiCo did not invest in Super Bowl advertising for its iconic brand. Instead, the company diverted this US$20 million to the social media-fueled Pepsi Refresh Project: PepsiCo's innovative cause-marketing program in which consumers submitted ideas for grants for health, environmental, social, educational, and cultural causes. in which individuals submit and vote on charitable and nonprofit collaborations. The main recipients of grants as part of the refresh project are community organizations with a local focus and nonprofit organizations, such as a high school in Michigan that—as a result of being selected in 2010—received US$250,000 towards construction of a fitness room. Following the Gulf of Mexico oil spill in the spring of 2010, PepsiCo donated US$1.3 million to grant winners determined by popular vote. As of October 2010, the company had provided a cumulative total of US$11.7 million in funding, spread across 287 ideas of participant projects from 203 cities in North America. In late 2010, the refresh project was reported to be expanding to include countries outside of North America in 2011.

=== Finances ===
Sales by business (2023)
Business	share
PepsiCo Beverages North America	30.2%
Frito-Lay North America	27.2%
Europe	14.5%
Latin America	12.7%
Africa, Middle East and South Asia	6.7%
APAC	5.3%
Quaker Foods North America	3.4%

For the fiscal year 2017, PepsiCo reported earnings of US$4.857 billion, with an annual revenue of US$62.525 billion, an increase of 1.2% over the previous fiscal cycle. PepsiCo's shares traded at over US$109 per share, and its market capitalization was valued at over US$155.9 billion in September 2018. PepsiCo ranked No. 45 on the 2018 Fortune 500 list of the largest United States corporations by total revenue.

Year	Revenue in million USD	Net income in million USD	Total Assets in million USD	Employees
2005	32,562	4,060	31,727	
2006	35,137	5,631	29,930	
2007	39,474	5,646	34,628	
2008	43,251	5,134	35,994	
2009	43,232	5,940	39,848	
2010	57,838	6,314	68,153	
2011	66,504	6,436	72,882	
2012	65,492	6,171	74,638	
2013	66,415	6,740	77,478	274,000
2014	66,683	6,503	70,509	271,000
2015	63,056	5,452	69,667	263,000
2016	62,799	6,329	73,490	264,000
2017	63,525	4,857	79,804	263,000
2018	64,661	12,515	77,648	267,000
2019	67,161	7,314	78,547	267,000
2020	70,372	7,120	92,918	291,000
2021	79,474	7,618	92,377	309,000
2022	86,392	8,910	92,187	315,000
2023	91,471	9,074	100,495	318,000
2023	91,854	9,578	99,467	319,000
2024	91,853	9,578	99,467	318,000
2025	93,924	8,240	107,399	306,000

== Brands ==
Largest PepsiCo Brands based on 2009 retail sales
Brand
Pepsi
Mountain Dew
Lay's potato chips
Gatorade
Diet Pepsi
Tropicana beverages
7 Up (outside U.S.)
Doritos tortilla chips
Lipton teas (in partnership with Lipton)
Quaker foods and snacks
Cheetos
Mirinda
Ruffles potato chips
Aquafina bottled water
Pepsi Max
Tostitos tortilla chips
Sierra Mist
Fritos corn chips
Walkers potato crisps
Source: 2009 PepsiCo Annual Report $0 $5b $10b $15b $20b

PepsiCo's product mix as of 2015 (based on worldwide net revenue) consists of 53 percent foods, and 47 percent beverages. On a worldwide basis, the company's current products lines include several hundred brands that in 2009 were estimated to have generated approximately US$108 billion in cumulative annual retail sales.

The primary identifier of a food and beverage industry main brand is annual sales over US$1 billion. As of 2015, 22 PepsiCo brands met that mark, including: Pepsi, Diet Pepsi, Mountain Dew, Lay's, Gatorade, Tropicana, 7 Up/Teem, Evervess, Doritos, Brisk, Quaker Foods, Cheetos, Mirinda, Ruffles, Aquafina, Naked, Kevita, Propel, Sobe, H2oh, Sabra, Starbucks (ready to Drink Beverages), Pepsi Max, Tostitos, Sierra Mist (discontinued in 2023 in favor of Starry), Fritos, Walkers, and Bubly.

== Competition ==
The Coca-Cola Company has historically been considered PepsiCo's primary competitor in the beverage market, and in December 2005, PepsiCo surpassed The Coca-Cola Company in market value for the first time in 12 years since both companies began to compete. In 2009, The Coca-Cola Company held a higher market share in carbonated soft drink sales within the U.S. In the same year, PepsiCo maintained a higher share of the U.S. refreshment beverage market, however, reflecting the differences in product lines between the two companies. As a result of mergers, acquisitions, and partnerships pursued by PepsiCo in the 1990s and 2000s, its business has shifted to include a broader product base, including foods, snacks, and beverages. The majority of PepsiCo's revenues no longer come from the production and sale of carbonated soft drinks. Beverages accounted for less than 50 percent of its total revenue in 2009. In the same year, slightly more than 60 percent of PepsiCo's beverage sales came from its primary non-carbonated brands, namely Gatorade and Tropicana. Keurig Dr Pepper is another major competitor. In 2024, market data showed that the company's flagship brand, Dr Pepper, had outsold Pepsi for the first time.

PepsiCo's Frito-Lay and Quaker Oats brands hold a significant share of the U.S. snack food market, accounting for approximately 39 percent of U.S. snack food sales in 2009. One of PepsiCo's primary competitors in the snack food market overall is Mondelez International (formerly Kraft Foods), which in the same year held 11 percent of the U.S. snack market share.

== Soviet Union ==
In 1959, the USSR held an exhibition of Soviet technology and culture in New York. The United States reciprocated with an exhibition in Sokolniki Park, Moscow, which led to the famous kitchen debate. One of the American products exhibited was Pepsi Cola. After obtaining a photo of then–US vice president Richard Nixon and Soviet premier Nikita Khrushchev sipping Pepsi, PepsiCo executive Donald Kendall was able to capture the attention of the Soviet people, and in 1972 he negotiated a cola monopoly in the USSR and Pepsi became the first US consumer product to be produced and marketed in the Soviet Union. Due to Soviet restrictions on transporting roubles abroad, PepsiCo struck a barter deal whereby Stolichnaya vodka would be exchanged for Pepsi syrup.

In 1989, amidst declining vodka sales, PepsiCo bartered for 2 new Soviet oil tankers, 17 decommissioned submarines (for $150,000 each), a frigate, a cruiser and a destroyer, which they could in turn sell for non-Soviet currency. The oil tankers were leased out through a Norwegian company, while the other ships were immediately sold for scrap. A deal struck the following year would've seen Pepsi acquire 85 ships worth nearly $3 billion over the next 10 years, but it only acquired 10 additional ships before the fall of the Soviet Union in 1991. The deal was renegotiated with the former nations of the USSR, and included receiving cheese from Russia to supply its Pizza Hut locations and receiving double-hulled tankers from Ukraine. These deals also originated an erroneous factoid which claims that, after acquiring the Soviet fleet, PepsiCo briefly possessed one of the most powerful navies in the world. In actuality, the only warships acquired by PepsiCo were "small, old, obsolete, unseaworthy vessels".

== Controversies ==
Pepsi has been repeatedly criticized by environmentalists for its relationship to negative environmental impacts of agriculture in its supply chain and in its distributing operations, such as palm oil–related deforestation and pesticide use, its use of water resources, and the negative impacts of its packaging—Pepsi's packaging has consistently been one of the top sources of plastic pollution globally.

Similarly, public health advocates have criticized Pepsi's high-calorie, poor nutrition product lines along with other popular snack and drink manufacturers. In response, PepsiCo made public comments on its commitment to minimizing their impact but has not released public information documenting progress on most of its public commitments.

=== Trade in Russia amid the Russo-Ukrainian War ===
Following the Russian invasion of Ukraine in February 2022, many Western companies curtailed their operations in Russia and Belarus. Immediately after the invasion, PepsiCo announced it would suspend sales of Pepsi-Cola and its other beverage brands in Russia, and halt new capital investment, advertising and promotional activity. While PepsiCo did cease the sale of Pepsi-branded products, it introduced near-identical replacements under other PepsiCo-owned brand names. Pepsi was replaced by Evervess-Cola ("Любимая кола"), while 7UP and Mirinda were replaced by PepsiCo's Frustyle brand. Critics have accused PepsiCo of circumventing its commitment to suspend the sale of its beverages by continuing to sell essentially the same drinks under different names.

PepsiCo has maintained a substantial business interest in Russia. According to its 2025 annual report, Russia accounted for approximately 5% of the company's global net revenue and 20% of its consolidated cash and cash equivalents at the end of 2025. The same report disclosed that PepsiCo paid US$237 million in income taxes in Russia during 2025, giving rise to criticism that the company is directly helping to fund Russia's war effort in Ukraine. Since September 2023, the Ukrainian National Agency on Corruption Prevention has included PepsiCo in its list of "International Sponsors of War", citing the company's continued operations in Russia and the significant taxes it pays to the Russian state.

=== Working conditions ===
In July 2021, Frito-Lay, a subsidiary of PepsiCo became the subject to media attention over poor working conditions at its plant in Topeka. These conditions, which allegedly include forced overtime and 84-hour workweeks for months, led to a strike involving hundreds of workers at the Topeka location. The strike began on July 5 and ended on July 23, after ratifications of a two-year contract that guarantees workers at least one day off each week and raised wages.

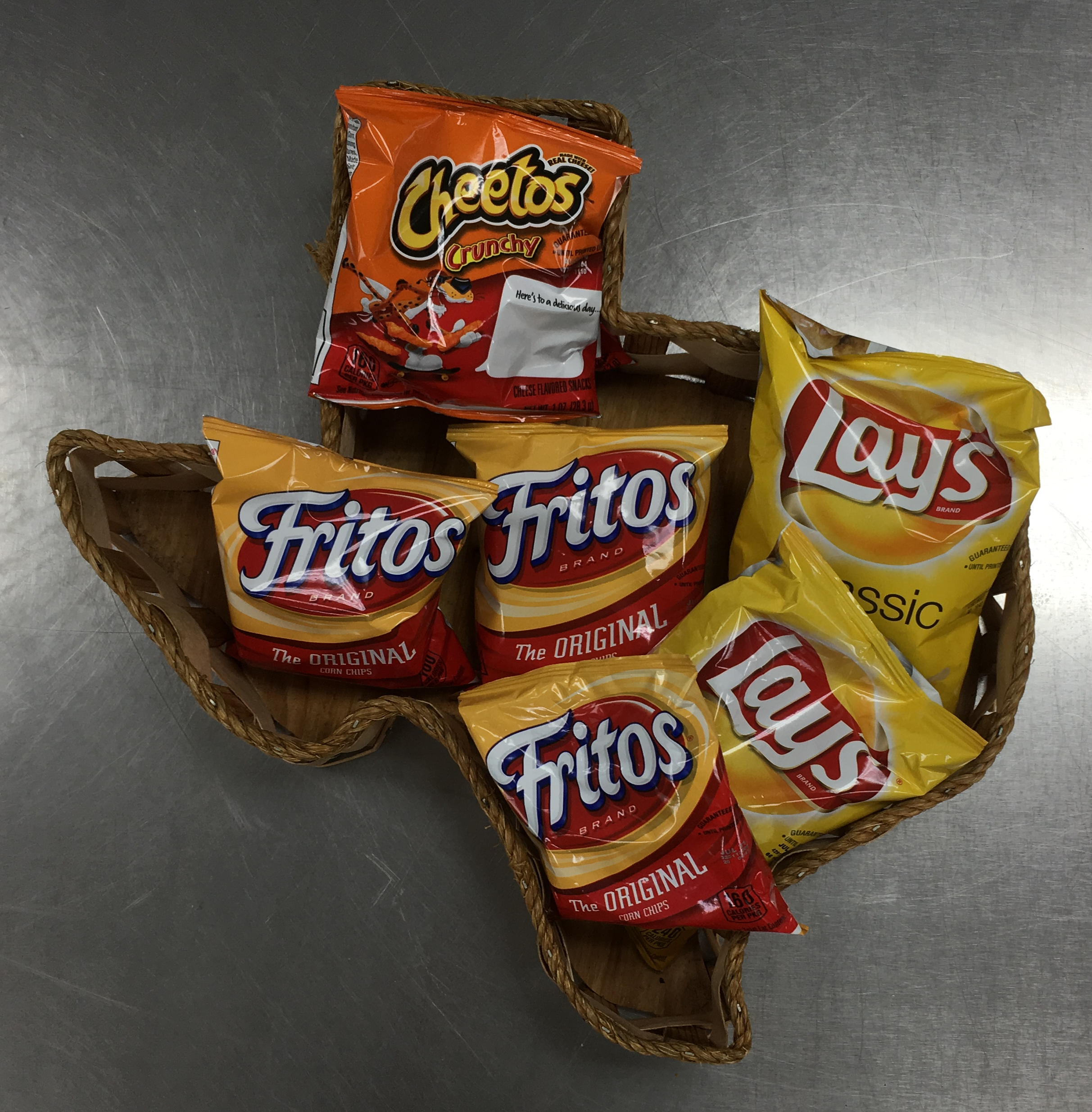
Frito-Lay company is based in Texas

=== Environmental record ===
==== Rainforests and palm oil ====
PepsiCo Palm Oil Commitments published in May 2014 were welcomed by media as a positive step towards ensuring that the company's palm oil purchases will not contribute to deforestation and human rights abuses in the palm oil industry. NGOs warned that the commitments did not go far enough, and in light of the deforestation crisis in Southeast Asia, have called on the company to close the gaps in its policies immediately.

==== Genetically modified ingredients ====
PepsiCo has contributed US$1,716,300 to oppose the passage of California Proposition 37, which would mandate the disclosure of genetically modified crops used in the production of California food products. PepsiCo believes "that genetically-modified products can play a role in generating positive economic, social and environmental contributions to societies around the world; particularly in times of food shortages."

==== Water usage (India, U.S., U.K.) ====
PepsiCo's usage of water was the subject of controversy in India in the early and mid-2000s, in part because of the company's alleged impact on water usage in a country where water shortages are a perennial issue. In this setting, PepsiCo was perceived by India-based environmental organizations as a company that diverted water to manufacture a discretionary product, making it a target for critics at the time.

As a result, in 2003 PepsiCo launched a country-wide program to achieve a "positive water balance" in India by 2009. In 2007, PepsiCo's then-CEO Indra Nooyi made a trip to India to address water usage practices in the country, prompting prior critic Sunita Narain, director of the Centre for Science & Environment (CSE), to note that PepsiCo "seem(s) to be doing something serious about water now." According to the company's 2009 corporate citizenship report, as well as media reports at the time, the company (in 2009) replenished nearly six billion liters of water within India, exceeding the aggregate water intake of approximately five billion liters by PepsiCo's India manufacturing facilities.

Water usage concerns have arisen at times in other countries where PepsiCo operates. In the United States, water shortages in certain regions resulted in increased scrutiny on the company's production facilities, which were cited in media reports as being among the largest water users in cities facing drought—such as Atlanta, Georgia. In response, the company formed partnerships with non-profit organizations such as the Earth Institute and Water.org, and in 2009 began cleaning new Gatorade bottles with purified air instead of rinsing with water, among other water conservation practices. In the United Kingdom, also in response to regional drought conditions, PepsiCo snacks brand Walkers' reduced water usage at its largest potato chip facility by 45 percent between 2001 and 2008. In doing so, the factory used machinery that captured water naturally contained in potatoes, and used it to offset the need for outside water.

As a result of water reduction practices and efficiency improvements, PepsiCo in 2009 saved more than 12 billion liters of water worldwide, compared to its 2006 water usage. Environmental advocacy organizations including the Natural Resources Defense Council and individual critics such as Rocky Anderson (mayor of Salt Lake City, Utah) voiced concerns in 2009, noting that the company could conserve additional water by refraining from the production of discretionary products such as Aquafina. The company maintained its positioning of bottled water as "healthy and convenient", while also beginning to partially offset environmental impacts of such products through alternate means, including packaging weight reduction.

==== Pesticide regulation (India) ====
PepsiCo's India operations were met with substantial resistance in 2003 and again in 2006, when an environmental organization in New Delhi made the claim that, based on its research, it believed that the levels of pesticides in PepsiCo (along with those from rival The Coca-Cola Company), exceeded a set of proposed safety standards on soft drink ingredients that had been developed by the Bureau of Indian Standards. PepsiCo denied the allegations, and India's health ministry has also dismissed the allegations—both questioning the accuracy of the data compiled by the CSE, as it was tested by its own internal laboratories without being verified by outside peer review. The ensuing dispute prompted a short-lived ban on the sale of PepsiCo and The Coca-Cola Company soft drinks within India's southwestern state of Kerala in 2006; however this ban was reversed by the Kerala High Court one month later.

In November 2010, the Supreme Court of India invalidated a criminal complaint filed against PepsiCo India by the Kerala government, on the basis that the beverages did meet local standards at the time of the allegations. The court ruling stated that the "percentage of pesticides" found in the tested beverages was "within the tolerance limits subsequently prescribed in respect of such product" because at the time of testing "there was no provision governing pesticide adulteration in cold drinks." In 2010, PepsiCo was among the 12 multinational companies that displayed "the most impressive corporate social responsibility credentials in emerging markets", as determined by the U.S. Department of State. PepsiCo's India unit received recognition on the basis of its water conservation and safety practices and corresponding results.

==== Packaging and recycling ====
Environmental advocates have raised concern over the environmental impacts surrounding the disposal of PepsiCo's bottled beverage products in particular, as bottle recycling rates for the company's products in 2009 averaged 34 percent within the U.S. In 2019, BreakFreeFromPlastic named PepsiCo a top 10 global plastic polluter for the second year in a row. A study published in Science Advances in 2024 found that PepsiCo was responsible for 5% of global branded plastic pollution (by count), which was the second-highest share of branded plastic pollution globally, with The Coca Cola Company being the highest producer.

One strategy enacted to reach this goal has been the placement of interactive recycling kiosks called "Dream Machines" in supermarkets, convenience stores, and gas stations, with the intent of increasing access to recycling receptacles. The use of resin to manufacture its plastic bottles has resulted in reduced packaging weight, which in turn reduces the volume of fossil fuels required to transport certain PepsiCo products. The weight of Aquafina bottles was reduced nearly 40 percent, to 15 grams, with a packaging redesign in 2009. Also in that year, PepsiCo brand Naked Juice began production and distribution of the first 100 percent post-consumer recycled plastic bottle.

On March 15, 2011, PepsiCo unveiled the world's first plant-based PET bottle. The bottle is made from plant-based materials, such as switch grass, corn husks, and pine bark, and is 100% recyclable. PepsiCo plans to reuse more by-products of its manufacturing processes such as orange peels and oat hulls in the bottles. PepsiCo has identified methods to create a molecular structure that is the same as normal petroleum-based PET—which will make the new bottle technology, dubbed "Green Bottle", similar to Coke's "PlantBottle" idea from 2009, which feel the same as normal PET. PepsiCo have said to pilot production in 2012, and upon successful completion of the pilot, intends moving to full-scale commercialization, however in 2021 there are still no records of such bottles being produced.

In a bid to reduce packaging consumption, in recent years the PepsiCoPartners launched as a service offering carbonated drinks dispensers within the US. The dispensers are currently being trialed in large corporate offices and universities.

In 2020 PepsiCo teamed up with French biochemistry startup Carbios in order to promote and establish a new recycling method for used plastic bottles. This method uses enzymes to dissolve plastic very thoroughly and the final leftovers can be used to produce textiles.

==== Energy use and greenhouse gas emissions ====
PepsiCo, along with other manufacturers in its industry, has drawn criticism from environmental advocacy groups for the production and distribution of plastic product packaging, which consumed an additional 1.5 billion US gallons (5,700,000 m^{3}) of petrochemicals in 2008. These critics have also expressed apprehension over the production volume of plastic packaging, which results in the emission of carbon dioxide. Beginning largely in 2006, PepsiCo began development of more efficient means of producing and distributing its products using less energy, while also placing a focus on emissions reduction. In a comparison of 2009 energy usage with recorded usage in 2006, the company's per-unit use of energy was reduced by 16 percent in its beverage plants and 7 percent in snack plants.

In 2009, Tropicana (owned by PepsiCo) was the first brand in the U.S. to determine the carbon footprint of its orange juice product, as certified by the Carbon Trust, an outside auditor of carbon emissions. Also in 2009, PepsiCo began the test deployment of so-called "green vending machines", which reduce energy usage by 15 percent in comparison to average models in use. It developed these machines in coordination with Greenpeace, which described the initiative as "transforming the industry in a way that is going to be more climate-friendly to a great degree."

PepsiCo has announced a global company goal of transitioning its electricity sources to 100% renewable energy, although they did not specify a specific year of which this goal would hypothetically occur at. PepsiCo has additionally also publicly announced its goal of decreasing its main operation's greenhouse gas emissions by 75% as compared to the 2015 baseline, by 2030. Pepsico has succeeded in achieving 23% of its absolute emissions target reduction as of 2022.

In 2025, PepsiCo and four other major food manufacturers were named in a report by the NewClimate Institute and Carbon Market Watch for failing to set a methane emissions reduction target from livestock and fertilizer use in its supply chain and overstating progress by relying on greenhouse gas removal rather than source reduction.

=== Product nutrition ===
According to its 2009 annual report, PepsiCo states that it is "committed to delivering sustainable growth by investing in a healthier future for people and our planet", which it has defined in its mission statement since 2006 as "Performance with Purpose". According to news and magazine coverage on the subject in 2010, the objective of this initiative is to increase the number and variety of healthier food and beverage products made available to its customers, employ a reduction in the company's environmental impact, and to facilitate diversity and healthy lifestyles within its employee base. Its activities in regards to the pursuit of its goals—namely environmental impacts of production and the nutritional composition of its products—have been the subject of recognition from health and environmental advocates and organizations, and at times have raised concerns among its critics. As the result of a more recent focus on such efforts, "critics consider (PepsiCo) to be perhaps the most proactive and progressive of the food companies", according to former New York Times food industry writer Melanie Warner in 2010.

==== Product diversity ====
From its founding in 1965 until the early 1990s, the majority of PepsiCo's product line consisted of carbonated soft drinks and convenience snacks. PepsiCo broadened its product line substantially throughout the 1990s and 2000s with the acquisition and development of what its CEO deemed as "good-for-you" products, including Quaker Oats, Naked Juice, and Tropicana orange juice. Sales of such healthier-oriented PepsiCo brands totaled US$10 billion in 2009, representing 18 percent of the company's total revenue in that year. This movement into a broader, healthier product range has been moderately well received by nutrition advocates; though commentators in this field have also suggested that PepsiCo market its healthier items as aggressively as less-healthy core products.

In response to shifting consumer preferences and in part due to increasing governmental regulation, PepsiCo in 2010 indicated its intention to grow this segment of its business, forecasting that sales of fruit, vegetable, whole grain, and fiber-based products will amount to US$30 billion by 2020. To meet this intended target, the company has said that it plans to acquire additional health-oriented brands while also making changes to the composition of existing products that it sells.

==== Ingredient changes in Pepsi ====
Public health advocates have suggested that there may be a link between the ingredient makeup of PepsiCo's core snack and carbonated soft drink products and rising rates of health conditions such as obesity and diabetes. The company aligns with personal responsibility advocates, who assert that food and beverages with higher proportions of sugar or salt content are fit for consumption in moderation by individuals who also exercise on a regular basis.

Changes to the composition of its products with nutrition in mind have involved reducing fat content, moving away from trans-fats, and producing products in calorie-specific serving sizes to discourage overconsumption, among other changes. One of the earlier ingredient changes involved sugar and caloric reduction, with the introduction of Diet Pepsi in 1964 and Pepsi Max in 1993—both of which are variants of their full-calorie counterpart, Pepsi. More recent changes have consisted of saturated fat reduction, which Frito-Lay reduced by 50% in Lay's and Ruffles potato chips in the U.S. between 2006 and 2009. Also in 2009, PepsiCo's Tropicana brand introduced a new variation of orange juice (Trop50) sweetened in part by the plant Stevia, which reduced calories by half. Since 2007, the company also made available lower-calorie variants of Gatorade, which it calls "G2". On May 5, 2014, PepsiCo announced that the company would remove brominated vegetable oil from many of its products, but a timeframe was not discussed.

==== Distribution to children ====
As public perception placed additional scrutiny on the marketing and distribution of carbonated soft drinks to children, PepsiCo announced in 2010 that by 2012, it will remove beverages with higher sugar content from primary and secondary schools worldwide. It also, under voluntary guidelines adopted in 2006, replaced "full-calorie" beverages in U.S. schools with "lower-calorie" alternatives, leading to a 95 percent reduction in the 2009 sales of full-calorie variants in these schools in comparison to the sales recorded in 2004. In 2008, in accordance with guidelines adopted by the International Council of Beverages Associations, PepsiCo eliminated the advertising and marketing of products that do not meet its nutrition standards, to children under the age of 12.

In 2010, Michelle Obama initiated a campaign to end childhood obesity (titled Let's Move!), in which she sought to encourage healthier food options in public schools, improved food nutrition labeling, and increased physical activity for children. In response to this initiative, PepsiCo, along with food manufacturers Campbell Soup, Coca-Cola, General Mills, and others in an alliance referred to as the "Healthy Weight Commitment Foundation", announced in 2010 that the companies will collectively cut one trillion calories from its products sold by the end of 2012 and 1.5 trillion calories by the end of 2015.

== See also ==
- Cola wars
- Joan Crawford
- List of assets owned by PepsiCo
- Pepsi Stuff
