= Salatrim =

Salatrim is the abbreviation for "Short- and long-chain acyl triglyceride molecule". It is a novel food additive, accepted as a reduced-calorie fat substitute according to the 2003 Novel food Regulation (EC) No 258/97 of the European Parliament. In 1999, Danisco, formerly Cultor Food Science, applied for approval of salatrims in the United Kingdom. In 2001, the Scientific Committee on Food delivered its opinion that salatrims were safe for human consumption.

== Characteristics ==
The EU document authorizing the use of salatrims describes them as "Clear, slightly amber liquid to a light coloured waxy solid at room temperature. Free of particulate matter and of foreign or rancid odour."

== Production ==
Salatrims are prepared by interesterification of short-chain triglycerides like triacetin or butyrin with hydrogenated vegetable oils.

== Dietary restrictions ==
The European Commission recommended that foods containing salatrims should be labeled with a statement that excessive consumption may lead to gastro-intestinal disturbance and that the products are not intended for use by children.
