= Munchos =

Snack food

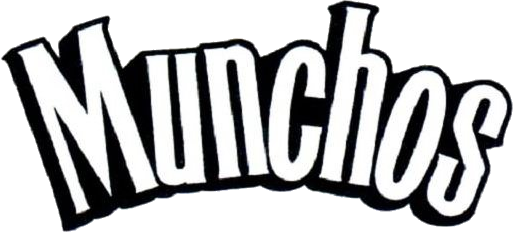
- Product type: Potato chips
- Current owner: PepsiCo
- Produced by: Frito-Lay
- Country: U.S.
- Introduced: 1969; 57 years ago
- Website: fritolay.com/munchos

Munchos are a potato chip snack food manufactured from dehydrated potatoes by Frito-Lay.

Munchos are somewhat similar to Lay's Stax and Pringles, which are also made from dried potatoes. Some reviews say that the chip differs in its "light and airy taste", and has more of a salty flavor than its more popular associate Lay's. Munchos are also kosher.

== History ==
Although originally marketed as being otherwise, the current incarnations of Munchos are actually thinner than most potato chips, to the point of being slightly transparent and containing air pockets. When first introduced, they were positioned as "a potato snack, thicker than potato chips." Their slightly curved shape and rough texture assist with dipping. Ingredients include dehydrated potatoes, corn and/or sunflower oil, corn meal, potato starch, salt, sulfate, niacin, thiamin mononitrate, riboflavin, and yeast.

In 1969, a 7.25oz., bag which sold for 59 cents retail is now sold—as of 2022—for $2.29 to $3.29, and $1.49 for the 2.25 oz. bag. The original Munchos debuted a few months after Pringles, another brand of product that identified as "potato crisps" (a term Pringles adopted after Frito-Lay successfully sued to prevent them from naming their product "potato chips"); early descriptions of Munchos closely parallel those of Pringles, with their curved shapes and thicker construction. Lay's Stax, a similar snack to Pringles, also marketed itself as "potato crisps".

== Advertising ==
Munchos advertising, 1969.

An ad campaign in 1969 included the phrase, "It's MUNCHOS!" spoken in a high-pitched voice. The commercials created by Jim Henson featured a spokesman named "Fred" (performed by Jim Henson) who talked about the Munchos and a monster named "Arnold" (performed by Jim Henson in one commercial, Frank Oz in later commercials) who craved the Munchos. Arnold's puppet eventually became Cookie Monster on Sesame Street, while Fred's puppet later became Zelda Rose on The Muppet Show.

== See also ==
- List of brand name snack foods
- Mixels
