= Munchies =

Munchies may refer to:

== Food ==
- Munchies (confectionery), sold by Nestlé
- Munchies (snack mix), sold by Frito-Lay
- Munchies, the mascots of the defunct Canadian Hostess Potato Chips brand
- Snack foods
- A strong hunger
  - In particular, see Effects of cannabis § Appetite

== Media ==
- Munchies (film), a 1987 comedy horror film
- Munchies, a food website owned by Vice Media
- The Munchies, a 1980s animated public service announcement from the ABC The Bod Squad series
- Munchies, a partially animated sketch comedy television series aired on Fuse in 2006
