= Procter and Gamble Chemicals =

- Company type: Division (business)
- Industry: Chemical industry
- Founded: 1850; 175 years ago
- Area served: Worldwide
- Products: Oleochemicals, soaps, glycerine, methyl esters, alcohols, fatty alcohols, and sucrose polyesters
- Parent: Procter and Gamble
- Website: www.pgchemicals.com

P&G Chemicals (PGC) is a division within Procter and Gamble that specializes in the production and distribution of oleochemicals throughout the world.

With a line of products including glycerine, methyl esters, alcohols, fatty alcohols, and sucrose polyesters such as Sefose and Olean, PGC produces raw materials essential for many commonly used consumer products, and is a global supplier for some of the world’s largest chemical companies.

== History of PGC ==
Over the years, P&G's business has been built on the use, production, and sale of oleochemicals. P&G has a long history of investments in the oleochemicals business and has adopted numerous changes within the company and leveraged those changes for the markets they serve. P&G Chemicals (PGC) emerged as a division within greater P&G to carry on the original business functions of the company. From its early days in the 1800s to the present day, PGC has taken a comprehensive approach to the oleochemicals business, thus ensuring supply dependability, reliable expertise, and global chemical capabilities. Starting in 1837, Procter and Gamble began producing chemicals, utilizing stearic acid, and re-selling the co-product red oil (olein) in Cincinnati, OH.

In 1858, P&G began producing branded products, starting with Star Glycerin, P&G’s first brand. Developing a host of new facilities in North America, Europe, and Asia, PGC has developed a competitive global supply chain and absorbed much of the original business functions of greater P&G. Specializing in the production of glycerine, methyl esters, alcohols, amines, fatty alcohols, and sucrose polyesters like Sefose and Olean, PGC supplies a variety of oleochemicals to companies around the world.
