= Panaché (Argus Panaché) =

European beverage

- Type: Beer cocktail
- Origin: Europe
- Introduced: 20th century
- Alcohol by volume: Typically 0.5% – 1.2%
- Color: Golden
- Ingredients: Beer, carbonated lemonade

Panaché (also known as Argus Panaché) is a popular non-alcoholic or low-alcoholic beverage originating from Europe, particularly enjoyed in France, Belgium, and various Mediterranean countries. The term Panaché translates to "mixed" or "blended" in French, reflecting the drink's composition: a mixture of beer and carbonated lemonade. It is similar to a shandy.

== Overview ==
Argus Panaché is a brand-specific variety of the panaché beverage, produced and distributed under the Argus label, known for offering affordable beers and related beverages, primarily available in European markets. It is characterized by its light, refreshing taste, low alcohol content (typically around 0.5% to 1.2% ABV), and slight sweetness, making it an appealing option for consumers seeking a mild alternative to beer.

== History ==
The concept of mixing beer with lemonade or soda water dates back to the early 20th century. The drink gained popularity in France and Germany (where a similar drink is known as Radler), especially as a summertime refreshment. The Argus Panaché version emerged as part of the Argus brand's expansion into flavored and non-traditional beer products, catering to changing consumer preferences favoring lighter beverages.

== Ingredients ==
Typical ingredients of Argus Panaché include:

- Pale lager or light beer
- Carbonated lemonade or citrus-flavored soda
- Water
- Sugar
- Natural flavorings
- Preservatives (in commercial varieties)

Some variations may include additional flavorings or use alcohol-free beer as the base.

== Serving ==
Argus Panaché is typically served chilled, often in a tall glass. Its bright, slightly golden color and foamy head resemble traditional lager beers but with a more citrus-forward aroma and taste. It is especially popular in cafés, bars, and supermarkets across Europe.
