= Lay's =

Snack food brand

- Left: Logo introduced in 2025 following a formulation change in the United States, now used worldwide Right: Logo introduced in 2019, still used in East Asian markets and for Lay's Stax outside of North America
- Product type: Potato chips
- Current owner: PepsiCo
- Produced by: Frito-Lay
- Country: United States
- Introduced: 1932; 94 years ago
- Related brands: Walkers; Smith's; Sabritas; Munchies; Chipsy; Margarita
- Markets: Worldwide
- Previous owners: Herman W. Lay
- Registered as a trademark in: United States, Canada
- Website: lays.com

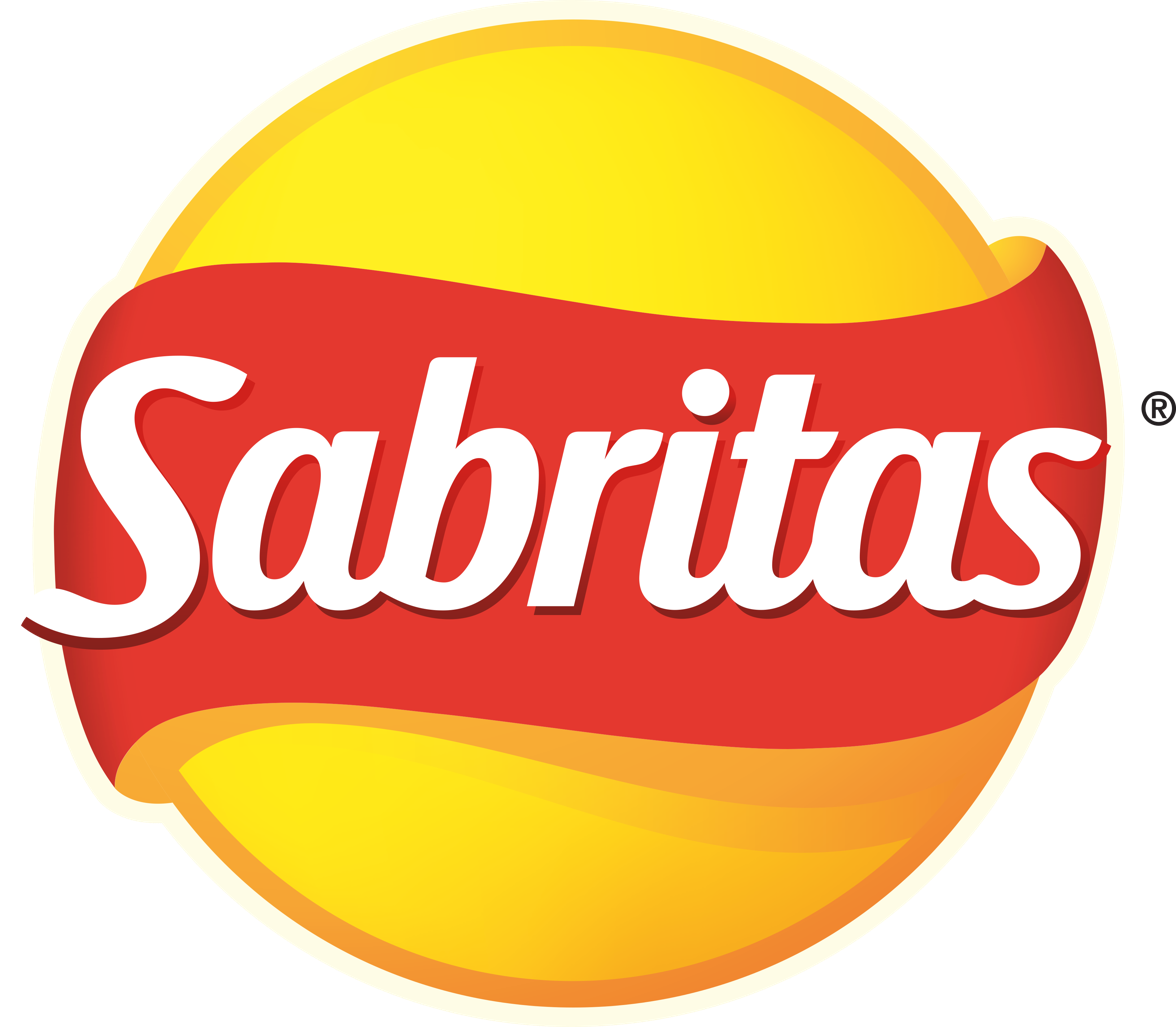
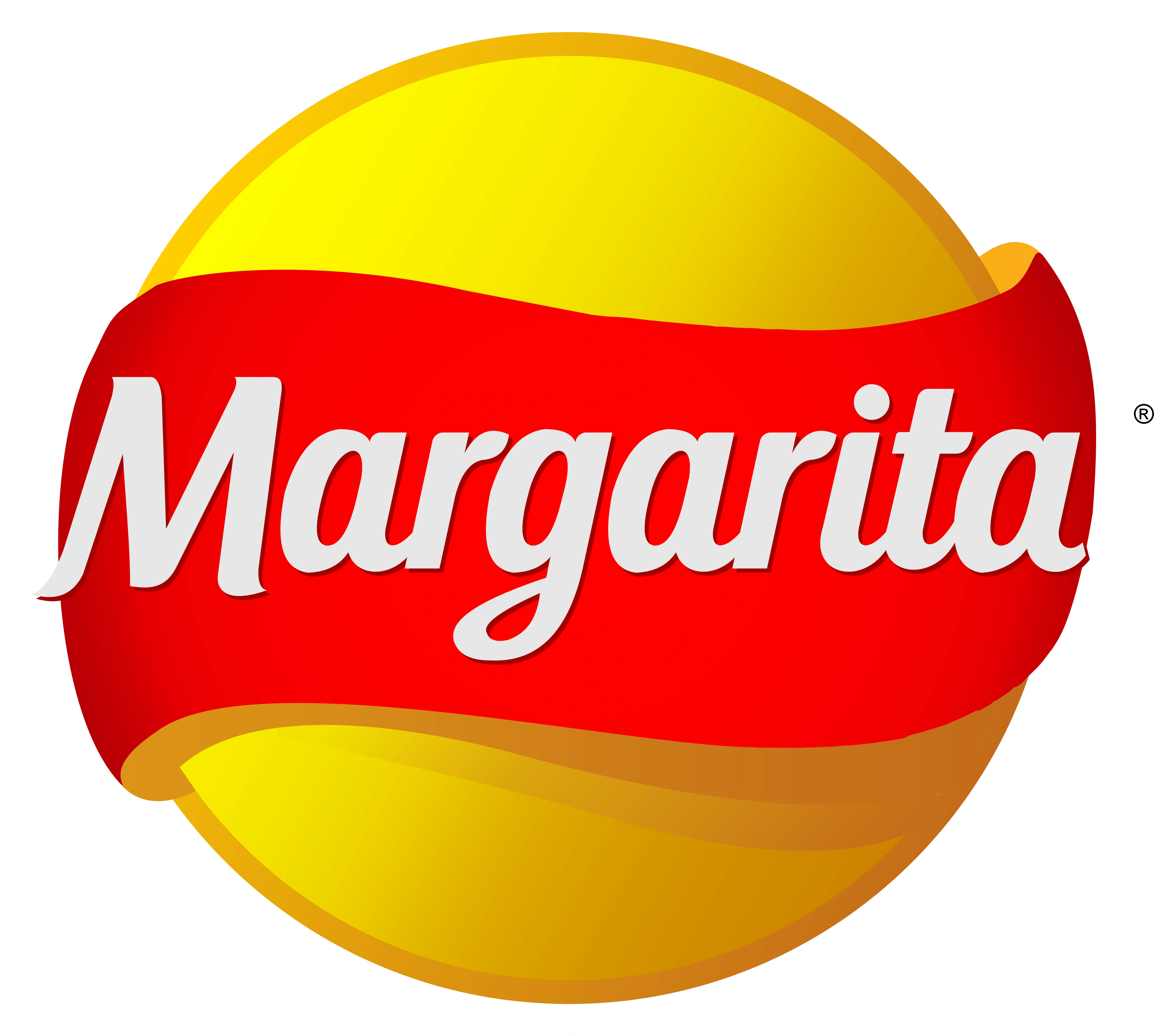
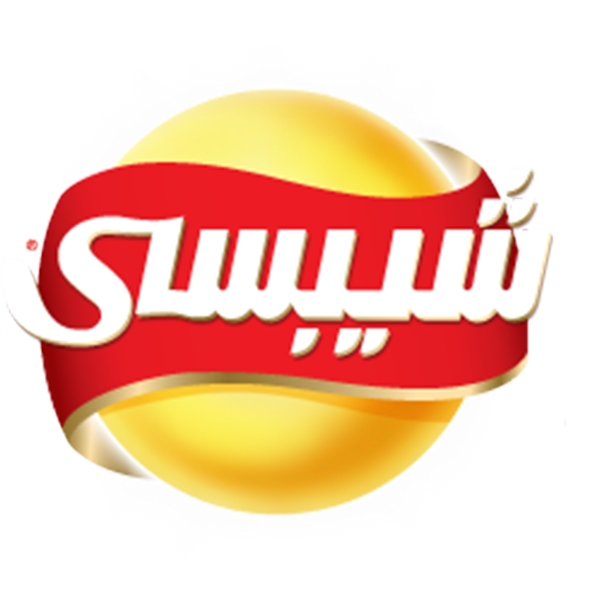
Although the products are consolidated under a common Lay's brand in most countries, some markets use their own names such as these.

Lay's (/leɪz/, LAYZ) is an American snack foods brand of potato chips and condiments that produce products in a range of different flavors that are sold in North America and various other countries across the world. The name derives from "Lay", the surname of the founder of the company originally formed in 1938 to produce potato chips.

The brand is also referred to as Frito-Lay, as both Lay's and Fritos are brands sold by the Frito-Lay company. The company has been a wholly owned subsidiary of PepsiCo since the merger with Pepsi in 1965. Frito-Lay uses the brand name "Lay's" in the United States and Canada. While PepsiCo also uses the brand name "Lay's" outside of North America, PepsiCo uses other brand names such as Walkers in the UK and Ireland, and Smith's in Australia.

The Lay's brand also contains the sub-brand of Lay's Stax, a stackable potato chip introduced as a competitor to Pringles.

== History ==
In 1932, salesman Herman Lay opened a snack food operation in Nashville, Tennessee. In 1938, he purchased the Atlanta, Georgia-based potato manufacturer Barrett Food Company, renaming it H.W. Lay Lingo & Company. Lay crisscrossed the southern United States, selling the product from the trunk of his car.

In 1961, the Frito Company, founded by Charles E. Doolin, merged with Lay’s, forming Frito-Lay Inc., a snack food giant with combined sales of over $127 million annually, which was then the highest sales revenue earned by any manufacturer. Shortly thereafter, Lay's introduced what became its best-known slogan: "betcha can't eat just one". Sales of the chips became international, with marketing assisted by a number of celebrity endorsers. Annual revenues for Frito-Lay exceeded $180 million by 1965, when the company had more than 8,000 employees and 46 manufacturing plants.

In 1965, Frito-Lay merged with the Pepsi-Cola Company to form PepsiCo, Inc. In 1991, the company introduced a new formulation of their chip that was crispier and kept fresher for longer. Shortly thereafter, the company introduced the "Lay's Wavy" products to grocery shelves, with a national rollout in 1994. In the mid-to-late 1990s, Lay's introduced a lower-calorie baked variety, and a fat-free variety (Lay's WOW chips) that contained the fat substitute olestra.

In the 2000s, the company introduced "kettle-cooked" varieties, as well as a more highly processed variety (Lay's Stax) that was intended to compete with Pringles, and several differently flavored varieties.

In 2012, Frito-Lay products comprised 59% of the United States savory snack-food market.

In April 2019, PepsiCo India sued four small farmers in Gujarat for intellectual property infringement, claiming they were growing the FC5 potato variety—used for production of Lay's—which the company had exclusive plant breeders' rights under the Protection of Plant Varieties and Farmers' Rights Act, 2001. The company offered to settle if the farmers joined their potato farming program or stopped growing FC5 potatoes. Later, in May, the company withdrew the lawsuits after discussions with the Indian government and pressure from activists.

In December 2021, PepsiCo India had its registration of the FC5 potato variety revoked by the Protection of Plant Varieties and Farmers' Rights Authority after a petition by Kavitha Kuruganti, a farmers' rights activist. PepsiCo India appealed to the Delhi High Court for reinstatement of the registration, which was initially dismissed in July 2023. However, on second appeal to the same court, the registration was reinstated in January 2024.

In fall 2025, Lay's rebranded their logo "to showcase that every chip is rooted in real potatoes."

== Nutritional information ==
As with most snack foods, the Lay's brands contain very few vitamins and minerals. At 10% of the daily requirement per serving, vitamin C is the highest. The salt content is very high, with a serving containing as much as 380mg of sodium.

A 1oz (28g) serving of Lay's regular potato chips has 160 kcal, and contains 10g of fat, with 1g of saturated fat. Kettle-cooked brands have 7g to 8g grams of fat and 1g of saturated fat, and are 140 kcal. Lay's Natural has 9g of fat, 2g of which are saturated fat, and 150 kcal. Stax chips typically contain 10g of fat, 2.5g of saturated fat, and are 160 kcal per serving. Lay's Wavy are identical to the regular brand, except for a 0.5g less of saturated fat in some combinations. Lay's and various brands do not contain any trans fats.

A 50g serving of Lay's Barbecue chips contains 270 kcal, and 17g of fat. It also contains 270mg of sodium, and 15% of the daily recommended dose of Vitamin C.

The baked variety, introduced in the mid 1990s, contains 1.5g of fat per 1oz serving, and has no saturated fat. Each serving has 110 to 120 kcal. Lay's Light servings are 75 kcal per ounce and have no fat.

Lay's Classic Potato chips were cooked in hydrogenated oil until 2003. In 2024, according to ET, in the United States the chips are made with sunflower, corn and/or canola oil.

== International ==
Frito-Lay primarily uses the brand name "Lay's" in the United States, and uses other brand names in some other countries, including Walkers (UK and Ireland); Smith's (Australia); Chipsy (Egypt and the West Balkans); Tapuchips (Israel); Margarita (Colombia); and Sabritas (Mexico).

| Country | Description |
|---|---|
| Argentina | PepsiCo commercialized potato chips under the name Frenchitas until 2001. They are now marketed under the Lay's label. |
| Australia | Frito-Lay acquired The Smith's Snackfood Company in 1998, finally bringing back together all arms of the former empire of Frank Smith, and merged its Frito-Lay Australian business into Smiths. Lay's crisps were rebranded with the name Thins. After Thins was sold to Snack Brands Australia (Owned by Arnotts), Smith's produced a line of potato chips under the Lay's brand for a brief period of time. The Lay's line was eventually rebranded in 2004 as Smith's Chips, while the traditional Smith's line was renamed Smith's Crinkles. This is still sold in Australia as a direct competitor to Smith's Chips. Since 2009, Lay's have been available in Australia exclusively at Costco, where they are available in a single flavor and size (500g plain). They continue to be manufactured in Australia by Smith's. |
| Bangladesh | Transcom Group have marketed and produced Lay's as they manage the franchise of PepsiCo in the country. It was introduced in 2023 and Lay's India helped them to establish its production plant in Bogra District. |
| Belgium | Smiths Food Group, another former part of Frank Smith's empire, was purchased by PepsiCo in 1992, and their products were re-branded as Lays in 2001. |
| Brazil | The first attempt to sell the brand in the country was in 1999, but it was discontinued after a short time. In 2004 another brand of chips began to be sold under the name Sensações (lit. Sensations) being targeted to the older audience with more exquisite flavors. It returned in 2013 and has remained on sale since then. In 2021, the Sensações brand was renamed as Lay's Sensações. |
| Canada | As Lay's were produced by another company at that time, the chips were known as Hostess. In 1996, Hostess was rebranded to Lay's with a television commercial featuring Mark Messier and Eric Lindros aired in 1997 that relaunched the brand. |
| Colombia | PepsiCo sell chips under the brand name Margarita. |
| Egypt | Lay's was once sold under its own label until it was merged with the local label Chipsy (Egyptian Arabic pronunciation: [ˈʃibsi, ˈʃipsi]). |
| France | The Lay's label has been used since 2003 replacing Croky. |
| India | Cricketers Mahendra Singh Dhoni, Gautam Gambhir and actors Saif Ali Khan and Ranbir Kapoor have endorsed Lay's. It was introduced in 1995 as Ruffles Lay's and it retained the name until 1999. |
| Indonesia | The Lay's label is distributed in Indonesia under the name Chitato Lite after the licensing agreement between PepsiCo and Indofood had expired in 2021. In March 2025, Lay's was reintroduced in Indonesia, which is currently produced by PT PepsiCo Indonesia Foods and Beverages in Cikarang, Bekasi Regency, West Java, is available in two flavors, Seaweed and Sweet Spicy Sauce, as well as Lay's Wavy in two flavours, Onion Fried Chicken and Grilled Beef. While PT Quaker Indonesia imported Lay's Stax from PepsiCo Thailand since January 2025 in three flavors, Original, Sour Cream & Onion, and Spicy Prawn. |
| Iraq | In Iraq, Lay's potato chips are manufactured locally by the Green Iraq Company at its factory in the Bazian region of the Sulaymaniyah Governorate, operating under PepsiCo standards. Local production utilizes domestically grown industrial potatoes from the Kurdistan region. In late 2024, Lay's introduced specific locally-inspired flavors specifically developed for the Iraqi market. |
| Israel | Lay's label is distributed with the name Tapuchips (תפוצ'יפס) by Strauss-Elite. |
| Mexico | PepsiCo acquired Sabritas S. de R.L. in 1966. Lay's along with other products such as Cheetos, Fritos, Doritos and Ruffles are marketed under the Sabritas brand. The logo for the Mexican company sports the red ribbon, but it has a stylized smiling face instead of the sun. It controls around 80% of the market. |
| Netherlands | Lay's used to be called Smith's in Belgium and the Netherlands until the name changed to Lay's in 2001. The Smith's brand persisted until 2016 when other products were also changed to Lay's. |
| Pakistan | In Pakistan, Lay's has been introduced in 2007 and has been endorsed by a renowned star of the country Ali Zafar. It is owned by Frito-Lay Pakistan alongside other brands such as Cheetos, Kurkure etc. |
| Serbia | Lay's are distributed as Chipsy, domestic company acquired by PepsiCo in 2008. |
| South Africa | Lay's are distributed by the Simba Chip company. |
| Spain | PepsiCo brought the Lay's brand to Spain in 1998. |
| United Arab Emirates | Lay's are sold as different labels. |
| Vietnam | The chips were sold under the name of Poca until it was rebranded to Lay's in 2019. |

== Flavors ==
Lay's Flavors

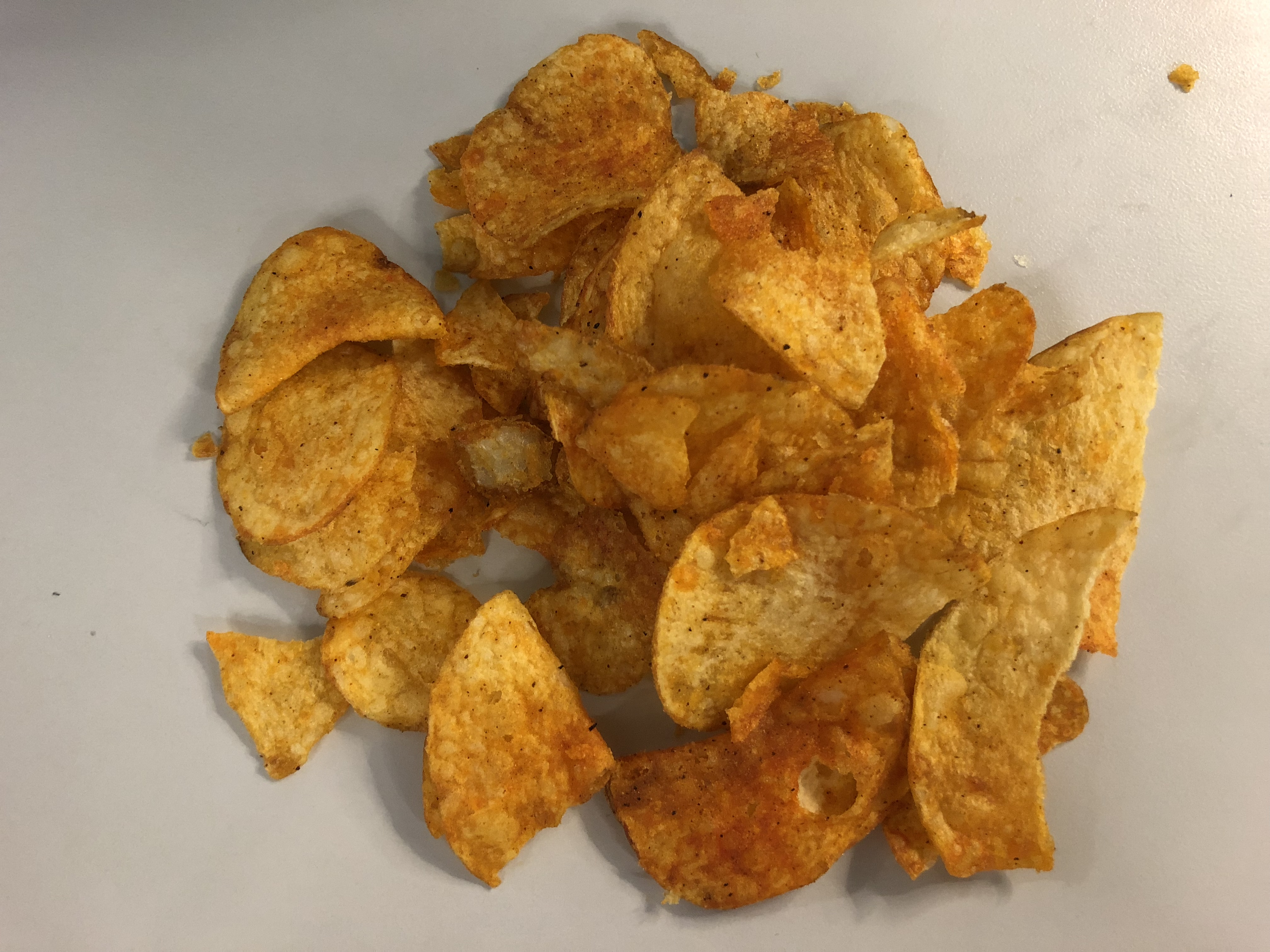
Barbecue

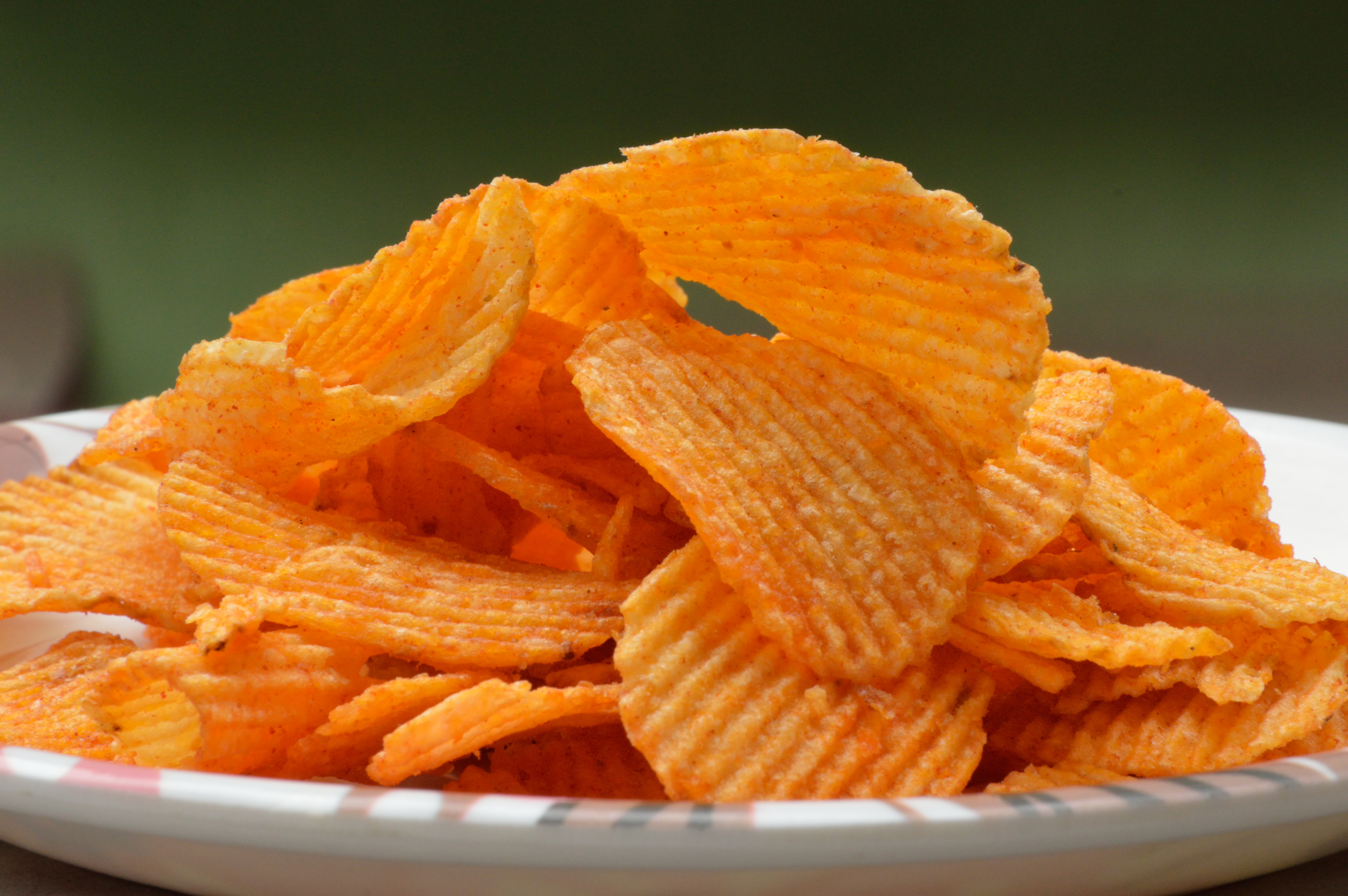
Spanish Tomato Tango

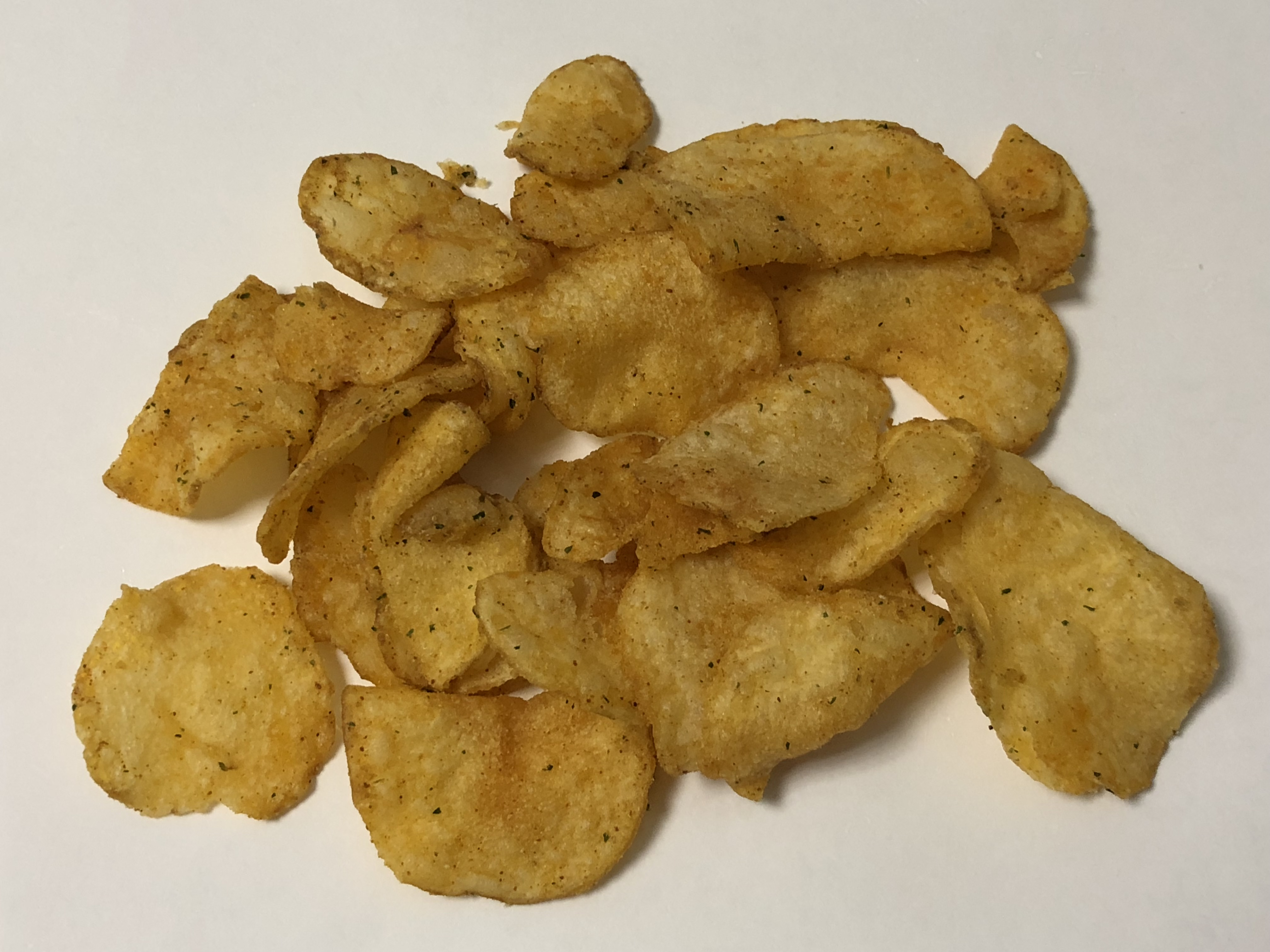
Kettle Cooked Jalapeño

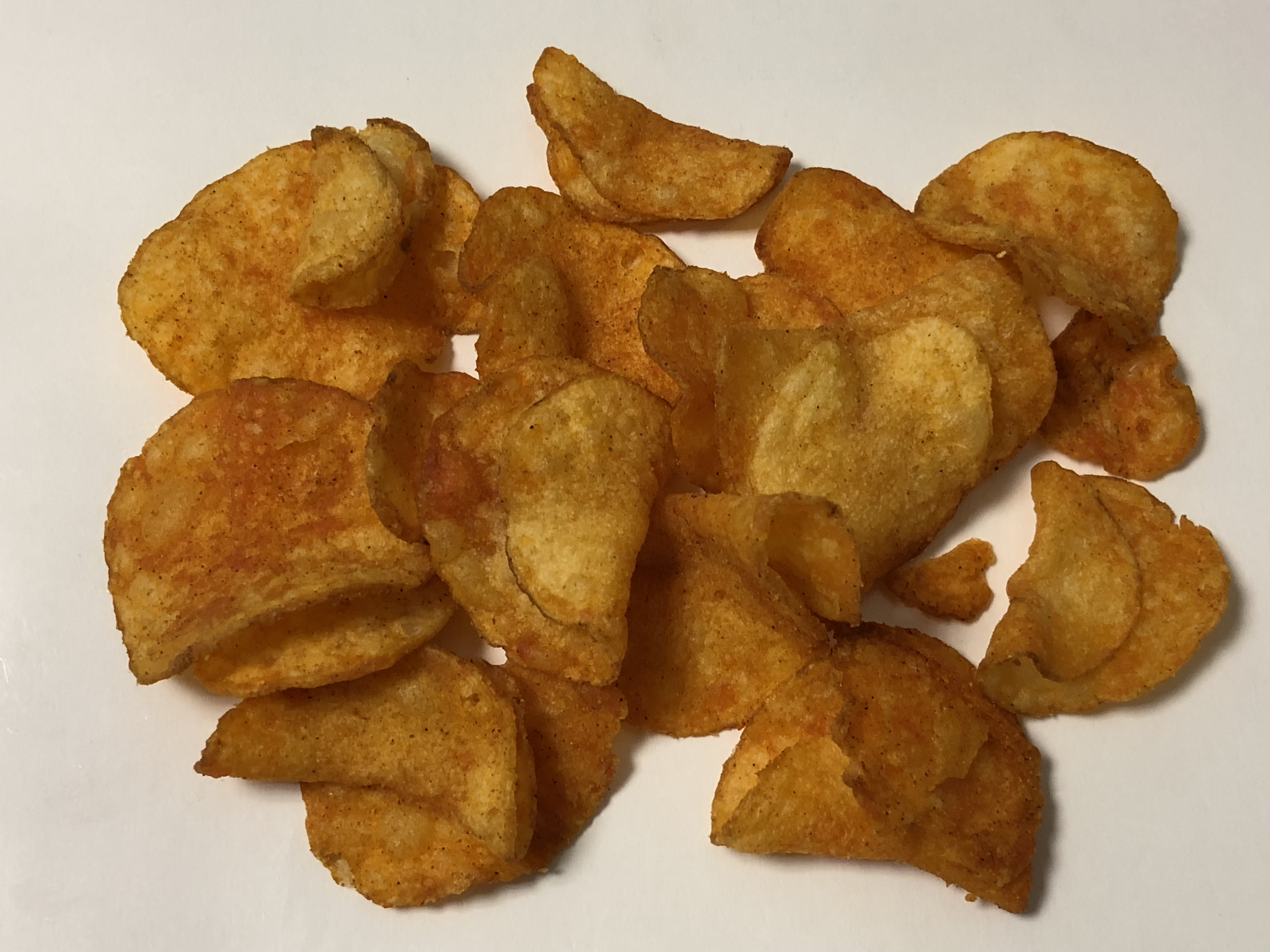
Kettle Cooked Mesquite BBQ

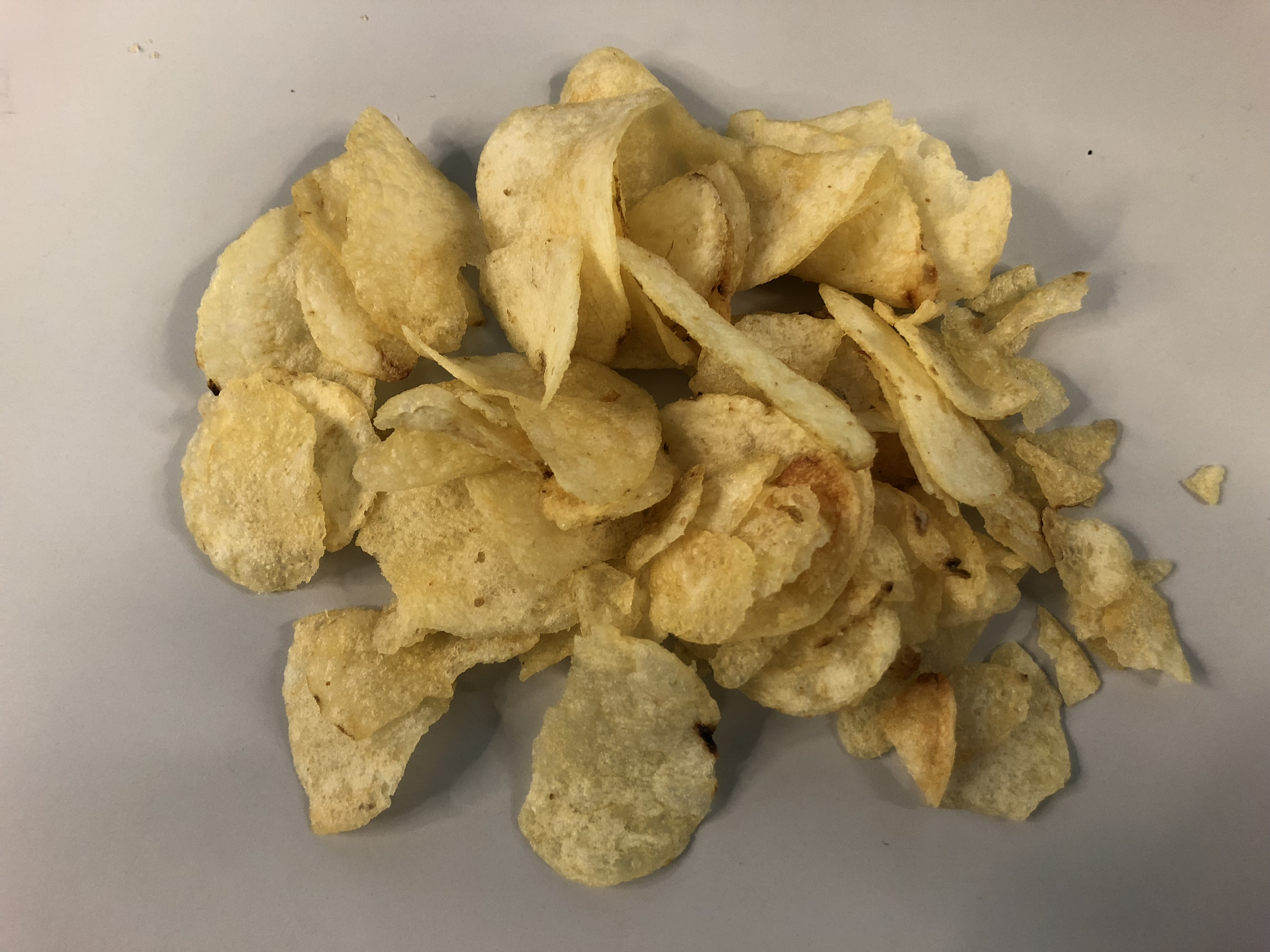
Salt & Vinegar

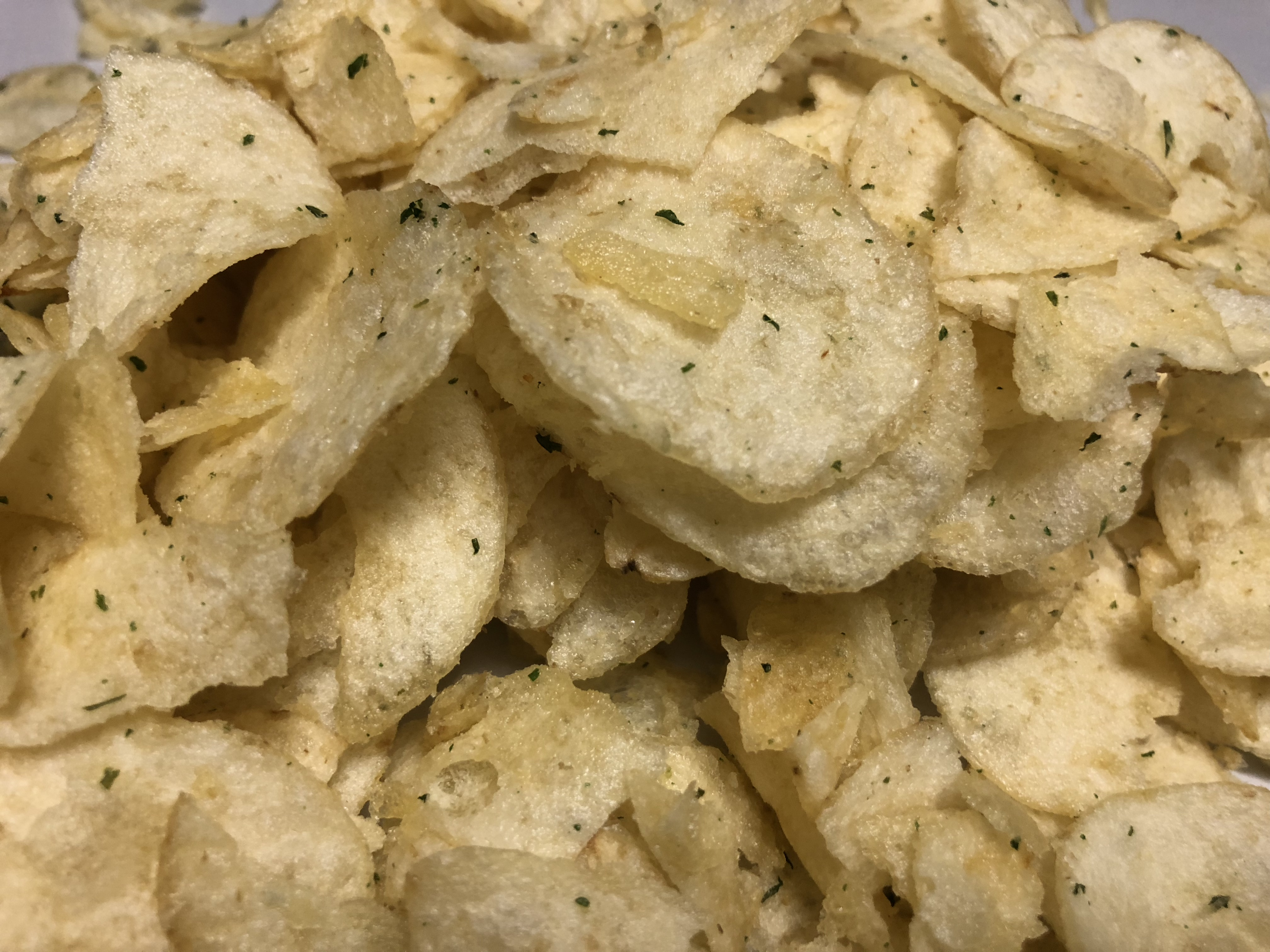
Sour Cream & Onion

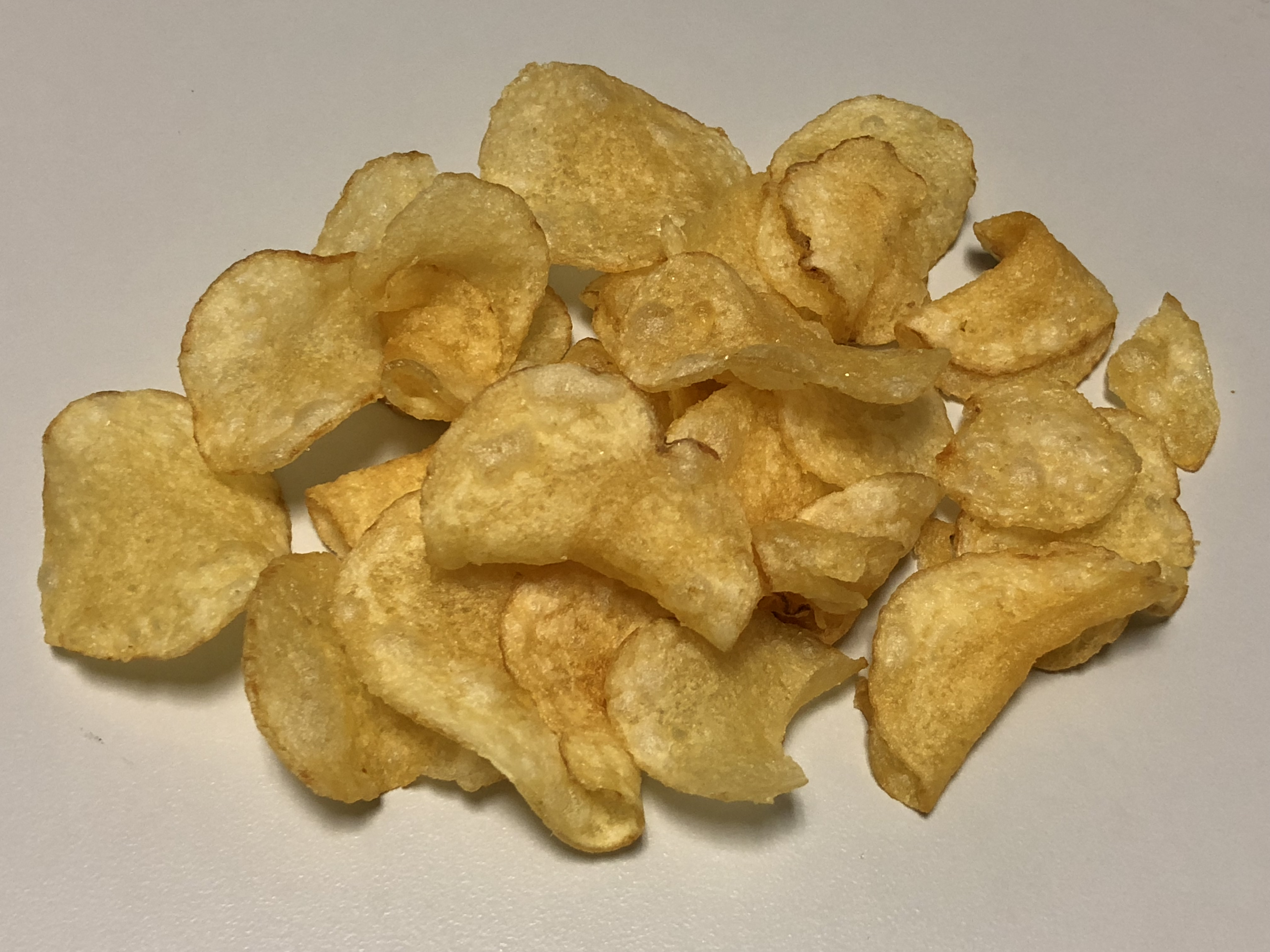
Kettle Cooked Original

| Country | Flavors |
|---|---|
| Belgium | Lay's: Natural, Paprika, Heinz Tomato Ketchup, Pickles, Barbecue Ham, Classic Burger, Bolognese, Roasted Chicken. Lay's Max: Original, Smoky Paprika, Salt & Black Pepper, Pickles. Lay's Max Strong: Hot Chicken Wings, Chilli & Lime, Flamin' Hot. Lay's Max Double Crunch: Spareribs, Red Sweet Chilli. Lay's Superchips Deep: American BBQ, Sweet Chilli. Lay's Iconic Local Flavors: Fries Mayo, Fries Andalouse. Lay's Oven Baked: Natural, Roasted Paprika, Mediterranean Herbs, Barbecue. Lay's Oven Baked Crispy Thins: Olive Oil & Herbs, Emmental Cheese. Lay's Oven Baked Crunchy Biscuits: Grilled Bacon, Tomato & Spring Onion, Paprika & Mediterranean Herbs. Lay's Sensations: Thai Sweet Chilli, Red Sweet Paprika, Mexican Peppers & Cream. Lay's Strong: Chilli and Lime, Hot Chicken Wings, Jalapeño and Cheese. Lay's Bugles: Nacho Cheese, Roasted Paprika, Sweet Chilli. Lay's Mama Mia's: Cheese & Paprika. Lay's Mixups: Natural, Paprika, Cheese. Lay's Wokkels: Paprika. Lay's Grills: Smoked. Lay's Stax: Original, Paprika. Lay's Sticks: Natural, Paprika. |
| Brazil | Lay's: Classic, Sour Cream, Salt & Vinegar. Lay's Rústicas: Cream Cheese and Sea Salt. Lay's Sensações: Grilled Chicken and Turkey Breast. |
| Canada | Lay's: Roast Chicken, Bar-B-Q, Classic, Salt & Vinegar, Ketchup, All Dressed, Sour Cream & Onion, Dill Pickle, Cheddar Jalapeño, Sea Salt & Pepper, Smokey Bacon, Cream & Onion, Magic Masala, Chicken and Tomato, Cucumber. Lay's Wavy: Cheddar & Sour Cream, Original, Salt & Vinegar, Hickory BBQ. Lay's Poppables: Sea Salt, White Cheddar, Honey BBQ, Sour Cream & Chive, Sea Salt & Vinegar. Lay's Lightly Salted: Classic, Bar-B-Q. Lay's Stax: Original, Salt & Vinegar, Cheddar, Bar-B-Q, Sour Cream & Onion. |
| China | Lay's Classic: American Classic, Italian Red Meat, Mexican Chicken Tomato, Texas Grilled BBQ, Cucumber, Lime, Numb & Spicy Hot Pot, Spicy Crayfish, Seaweed, Wasabi, Fried Crab, Stewed Chicken with Rattan Pepper, Fresh Little Tomato, Roasted Fish, Roasted Garlic Oyster, Roasted Cumin Lamb Skewer, Sichuan Spicy Chicken, Sour Fish Pot. Lay's Stax: Original, Tomato, Cucumber, Lime, Garden Tomato, Sizzled Barbecue, Finger Licking Braised Pork, Black Pepper Rib Eye Steak, Sweet Mustard, Coconut Milk, Salty and Delicious, Black Pepper, Sweet and Sour Rose, Spicy Crayfish, Roasted Seaweed. Lay's Wavy: Roasted Chicken Wing, Grilled Squid, Grilled Pork, American Classic, Pure Spicy, Pure Tomato. Lay's Natural: Sea Salt, Seaweed, Refreshing Lemon. Lay's Taro: Mellow Ribs, Mellow Sea Salt and Black Pepper, Refreshing Lime. Lay's French Fries: Classic Original, Seaweed, Tomato, Cheese Butter, Hefeng Grapefruit. Lay's Yam Chips & Rolls: Pastoral Tomato, Fresh Cucumber, Roasted Chicken Wings, Steak with Black Pepper, Fragrant Red Stew. |
| Egypt | Since its acquisition of Chipsy (شيبسى [ˈʃibsi, ˈʃipsi, ˈʃebsi], shortened to [ʃebs]), Lay's chips (marketed as Chipsy) in Egypt inherited the Chipsy range of flavors as well as the pre-merger Lay's flavors. These flavors include: Salt and Vinegar, Cheese (most likely based on Rumi cheese), Seasoned Cheese, Tomato (a Ketchup-based flavor), Charcoal-grilled Kebab, Chili & Lime, Peri peri. Forno: French Cheese, Tomato & Za'atar, Crushed Black Pepper & Salt, Basil & Spices. Forno Fusion: Cumin & Lemon, Lebanese Mix, Mediterranean Greek Mix, Sweet Chili & Tangy Cheese. Playz (Discontinued): Tomato & Black Pepper, Chicken & Herbs, Cheese & Chili. Flamin' Hot: Regular Flamin' Hot, Flamin' Hot with Lime. In 2010, a Shrimp flavor was added after a national contest. |
| France | Lay's: Nature, BBQ, Roast Chicken, Paprika, Mustard Pickles, Cheese & Onion, Bolognese, Emmental, Salt & Vinegar, Spicy, Ketchup, Cheeseburger, Sour Cream & Onion, Goat Cheese. Lay's Max: Nature, BBQ, Chicken with Herbs, American Burger Sauce. Lay's 3D's: Nature. Lay's Old Fashioned: Nature, Country Ham, Old Fashioned Mustard. Lay's Country: Nature, Jura Cheese & Black Pepper, Caramelized Roscoff Onion & Fresh Cheese, Garonne & Fine Herbs. Lay's Mediterranean: Nature, Province Herbs. Lay's Fritelle: Nature, Emmental, Bacon. Lay's Mixups: Salted, Cheese & Ham, Cheese. Lay's Stax: Original, Barbecue, Sour Cream & Onion, Emmental. Lay's Oven Baked: Nature, Herbs. |
| Germany | Lay's: Herbal Butter, Salt & Vinegar, Sour Cream & Black Pepper, Salted, Paprika, Sour Cream & Onion, Smoked Bacon, Sweet Paprika. Bugles: Nacho Cheese, Paprika, Original, Sour Cream, Black Pepper. Super Chips: Salt, Paprika. Light: Salted, Paprika. Iconic Restaurant Flavors: Pizza Hut Margherita, KFC Original Recipe, Subway Teriyaki. |
| Greece, Cyprus | Lay's are made and packed by Tasty Foods and Corina Snacks LTD, with Mediterranean flavors which include Feta cheese flavor, Tzatziki, Olive and Tomato, Oregano, Sea Salt & Black Pepper, Onion & Cheese, Prawn Cocktail, Salt, Salt & Vinegar, Barbeque and various more. There are hundreds of sub-variations in the Mediterranean line adjusted to each country's liking. |
| India | Lay's: Classic Salted, American Style Cream & Onion, Chile Limón, India's Magic Masala, Sizzling Hot, Spanish Tomato Tango, West Indies' Hot 'n' Sweet Chilli. Lay's Crispz: Herb and Onion. Lay's Stax: Original, Cheddar Cheese, Mesquite Barbecue. Lay's Wafer Chips: Red Chilli, Salt with Pepper. Lay’s Maxx: Sizzling Barbecue, Macho Chilli, Peppery Cheddar. Promotions: In 2025, Lays released their latest promotion, aptly named "Flavors of the World". Flavors Mediterranean Pizza and Korean Chilli were released. |
| Indonesia, Malaysia, Brunei Darussalam, Timor Leste | The flavors are Salmon Teriyaki, Classic Salty, Nori Seaweed, Pizza, Grilled Chicken Paprika, Duck's Tongue and Fiesta BBQ. It is produced by Indonesian-based PT Indofood Fritolay Makmur, a joint venture between PT Indofood CBP Sukses Makmur with Seven-Up Nederland B.V. |
| Iraq | Lay's: Classic, French Cheese, Kebab, Dolma, Burger. Lay's Max: Yogurt & Herbs. |
| Mauritius | Lay's flavors consist of Barbeque, Salt and Vinegar, Roasted Chicken, Paprika, Cheese, Onion. |
| Mexico | Lay's potato chips are known as Sabritas in Mexico, a name which is also used for Frito-Lay brands as a whole. Sabritas: Original, Adobadas, Cream and Spices, Flamin' Hot, Lime. Sabritas Receta Crujiente: Salt, Flamin' Hot, Jalapeño, Red Chiles, Salsa Negra. Sabritas Sensaciones: Dried Smoked Chiles, Manzano Chile with Lime. Sabritas Switch: Cheetos Puffs. |
| Netherlands | Lay's: Natural, Paprika, Bolognese, BBQ Ham, Patatje Joppie, Cheese & Onion, Pickles. Lay's Max Double Crunch: Spare Ribs, Red Sweet Chilli. Lay's Max: Smoky Paprika, Original, Patatje Joppie, Heinz Tomato Ketchup, Salt & Black Pepper, Pickles, Cheddar & Onion. Lay's Max Strong: Hot Chicken Wings, Chili & Lime, Flamin' Hot. Lay's Iconic Local Flavors: Chips Mayo, Fries Satay Sauce. Lay's Iconic Restaurant Flavors: KFC Original Recipe Chicken, Subway Teriyaki, Pizza Hut Margherita. Lay's Super Chips Deep: American BBQ, Sweet Chilli. Lay's Oven Baked: Natural, Roasted Paprika, Mediterranean Herbs, Barbecue. Lay's Oven Baked Crispy Thins: Emmental Cheese, Olive Oil & Herbs. Lay's Oven Baked Crunchy Biscuits: Tomato & Spring Onion, Paprika & Mediterranean Herbs. Lay's Sensations: Thai Sweet Chilli, Red Sweet Paprika, Mexican Peppers & Cream. Lay's Strong: Chilli and Lime, Hot Chicken Wings, Jalapeño and Cheese. Lay's Hamka's: Original. Lay's Bugles: Nacho Cheese, Roasted Paprika, Sweet Chilli, Peanut. Lay's Mixups: Paprika, Natural, Cheese. Lay's Wokkels: Paprika, Natural. Lay's Grills: Smoked. Lay's Mama Mia's: Cheese & Paprika. Lay's Pomtips: Original. Lay's Light: Original, Paprika. Lay's Sticks: Natural, Paprika. Influencers 2025 Mac and Cheese, Roasted Garlic and Herbs, Chorizo & Onion. Influencers 2026 Sweet Teriyaki, Apple Caramel, Smoked Bacon & Caramelized Peach. |
| Pakistan | Lay's: Classic, French Cheese, Masala, Paprika, Yogurt & Herb. Lay's Wavy: Flamin' Hot, Mexican Chili, Texas BBQ, Black Salt. |
| Peru | Lay's: Classic. Lay's Ondas (Wavy): Classic, Jalapeño, Mayonnaise, Spicy, Sweet BBQ. Lay's Artesanas: Sea Salt, Alitas BBQ. |
| Philippines, Thailand | Flavors featured are Classic, Sour Cream & Onion, Cheese & Onion, Mexican Bar-B-Q, Japanese Nori Seaweed, Basil, Squid, Spicy Chili Squid, Seafood and Mayonnaise, and Spicy Seafood. Temporary international flavors have also been introduced, such as French Mayonnaise, Balsamic Vinegar and Salt (England), Garlic Soft Shelled Crab (Hong Kong), Soy Sauce, Salmon Teriyaki (Japan), Lobster, Bacon & Cheese (America). Other traditional "Thai" flavors include Tom Yum, Thai Chili Paste, Thai Seafood Dip, Chili and Lime. |
| Poland | Lay's: Salted, Green Onion, Fromage, Paprika, Spicy Paprika, Spicy Chicken. Lay's Max Ridged: Salted, Green Onion, Paprika. Lay's Max Strong: Chilli & Lime, Cheese & Cayenne. Lay's Max Deep-Cut: Paprika, Cheese & Onion. Lay's Oven Baked: Salted, Grilled Paprika, Yoghurt with Herbs, Grilled Vegetables, Chanterelles in a Cream Sauce. Lay's Oven Baked Multigrain Crackers: Paprika with Herbs, Vegetables with Green Onion, Tomato with Basil. Lay's Bugles: Nacho Cheese, Paprika Style. Lay's Stix: Ketchup. Other: Salt & Vinegar and other flavors are also available at Żabka stores. |
| Romania | Lay's: Salt, Cheese, Wild Mushrooms & Sour Cream, Barbecue, Sour Cream & Dill, Paprika, Chicken with spices, Tomatoes and garlic. Lay's Maxx: Paprika, Salt, Cheddar & Onion. Lay's Oven Baked: Yoghurt & Herbs, Salt, Paprika, Chanterelles Mushrooms, Aromatic Cheese. Lay's Wavy: Hot Piri-Piri, Salt, Cheese. |
| Russia | Lay's: Salt, Chives, Sour Cream and Herbs, Crab, Grilled Ribs, Bacon, Cheese, Red Caviar. Lay's Wavy: Salmon in Cream Sauce, Sour Cream and Onion, Paprika, Lobster. Lay's Oven Baked: Sour Cream and Aromatic Herbs, Chanterelles in Sour Cream, Delicate Cheese with Herbs. Lay's Stax: Spicy Paprika, Delicate Sour Cream and Onion, Fragrant Barbecue Ribs. Lay's Stix: Sour Cream and Onion, Ketchup. Lay's Maxx: 4 Cheese Pizza, BBQ Chicken Wings, Mushrooms in a Creamy Sauce. |
| Saudi Arabia and the Gulf Cooperation Council countries | Lay's: Salt, Salt & Vinegar, Chilli, Chilli-Lemon, Ketchup, French Cheese, Pizza, and Flaming Hot. Lay's Max: Chili, Cheese and Italian Blend. Lay's Forno: Authentic Cheese, Black Pepper, Lemon & Black Pepper, Labneh & Mint, Italian Mix (a spicy tomato flavor) and Za’atar. |
| South Africa | Salted, Caribbean Onion & Balsamic Vinegar, Sweet & Smoky American BBQ, Spring Onion & Cheese, Thai Sweet Chilli |
| United States | Lay's: Classic, All Dressed, Barbecue, Sour Cream & Onion, Cheddar & Sour Cream, Flamin' Hot, Salt & Vinegar, Sweet Southern Heat Barbecue, Honey Barbecue, Chile Limón, Limón, Dill Pickle, Chesapeake Bay Crab Spice (regional). Lay's Better For You: Lightly Salted Classic, Kettle Cooked Reduced Fat Original, Lightly Salted Wavy, Baked Barbecue, Baked Original, Baked Loaded Potato, Baked Roasted Garlic and Herbs. Lay's Dips: French Onion, Smooth Ranch. Lay's Kettle Cooked: Flamin' Hot, Original, Jalapeño, Mesquite BBQ, Sea Salt & Vinegar, Cajun Spice, Reduced Fat Original. Lay's Poppables: Sea Salt, White Cheddar. Lay's Stax: Original, Sour Cream & Onion, Mesquite BBQ, Cheddar. Lay's Wavy: Original, Hickory BBQ. |
| Vietnam | Lay's: Natural Classic, Brazil BBQ Pork Rib, Nori Seaweed, Baked Prawn with Melted Cheese, Sour and Spicy Tomyum Hotpot, Hanoi Beef Pho, Seven-Spice Taiwanese Crispy Squid, Grilled Scallops with Garlic Butter. Lay’s Wavy: Original Fine Salt, Texas Tenderloin Steak, Cheddar Cheese, Korean Spicy Chicken with Cheese, Hong Kong Crab XO Sauce, Lobster with Golden Salted Egg Sauce, 2-in-1 Grilled Steak & Kimchi. Lay’s Max: Sour Cream & Onion, Wagyu Beef, Truffle Mushroom, Japanese Style Seaweed. Lay's Stax (imported from Thailand and Malaysia): Original, Hot Chili Squid, Sour Cream & Onion, Spicy Lobster, BBQ, Hot & Spicy, Wagyu Beef With Truffle Mushroom Sauce, British Style Cheddar Cheese. |

== See also ==
- Lay's Replay Field (Santa Ana)
