= Butyrin =

Butyrin (Russian: Бутырин) is a Russian masculine surname originating from the word butro, meaning fat belly; its feminine counterpart is Butyrina. The surname may refer to the following notable people:

- Sergei Butyrin (born 1987), Russian football player
- Vitaly Butyrin (1947–2020), Soviet and Lithuanian photographer

== See also ==
- Tributyrin, a chemical present in butter
- Notarcha butyrina, a moth
