= Notarcha recurrens =

Scientific classification
- Domain: Eukaryota
- Kingdom: Animalia
- Phylum: Arthropoda
- Class: Insecta
- Order: Lepidoptera
- Family: Crambidae
- Genus: Notarcha
- Species: N. recurrens

Binomial name
- Notarcha recurrens (Moore, 1888)

Synonyms
- Haritala recurrens Moore, 1888

Species of moth

Notarcha recurrens is a moth in the family Crambidae. It was described by Frederic Moore in 1888. It is found in India.
