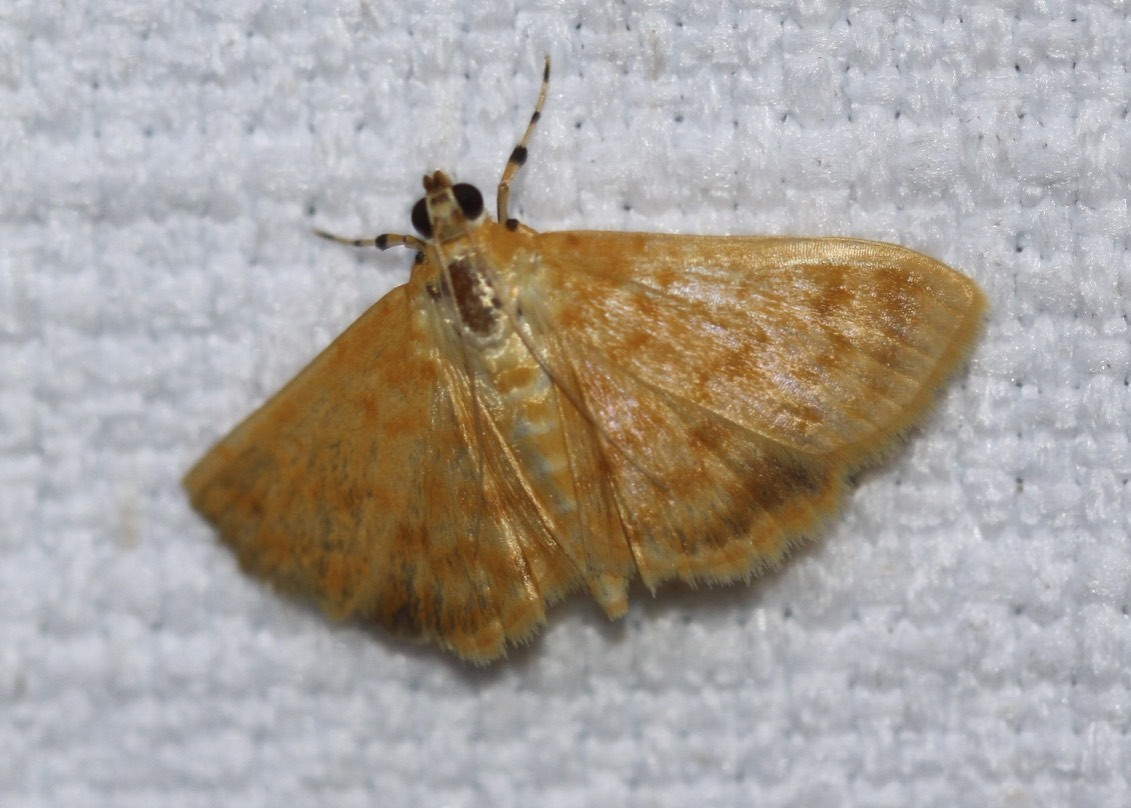

Scientific classification
- Kingdom: Animalia
- Phylum: Arthropoda
- Class: Insecta
- Order: Lepidoptera
- Family: Crambidae
- Genus: Notarcha
- Species: N. chrysoplasta

Binomial name
- Notarcha chrysoplasta Meyrick, 1884

Synonyms
- Lygropia chryselectra Lower, 1903

= Notarcha chrysoplasta =

Species of moth

Notarcha chrysoplasta is a species of moth in the family Crambidae. It was described by Edward Meyrick in 1884. It is found in Australia, where it has been recorded in Queensland.
