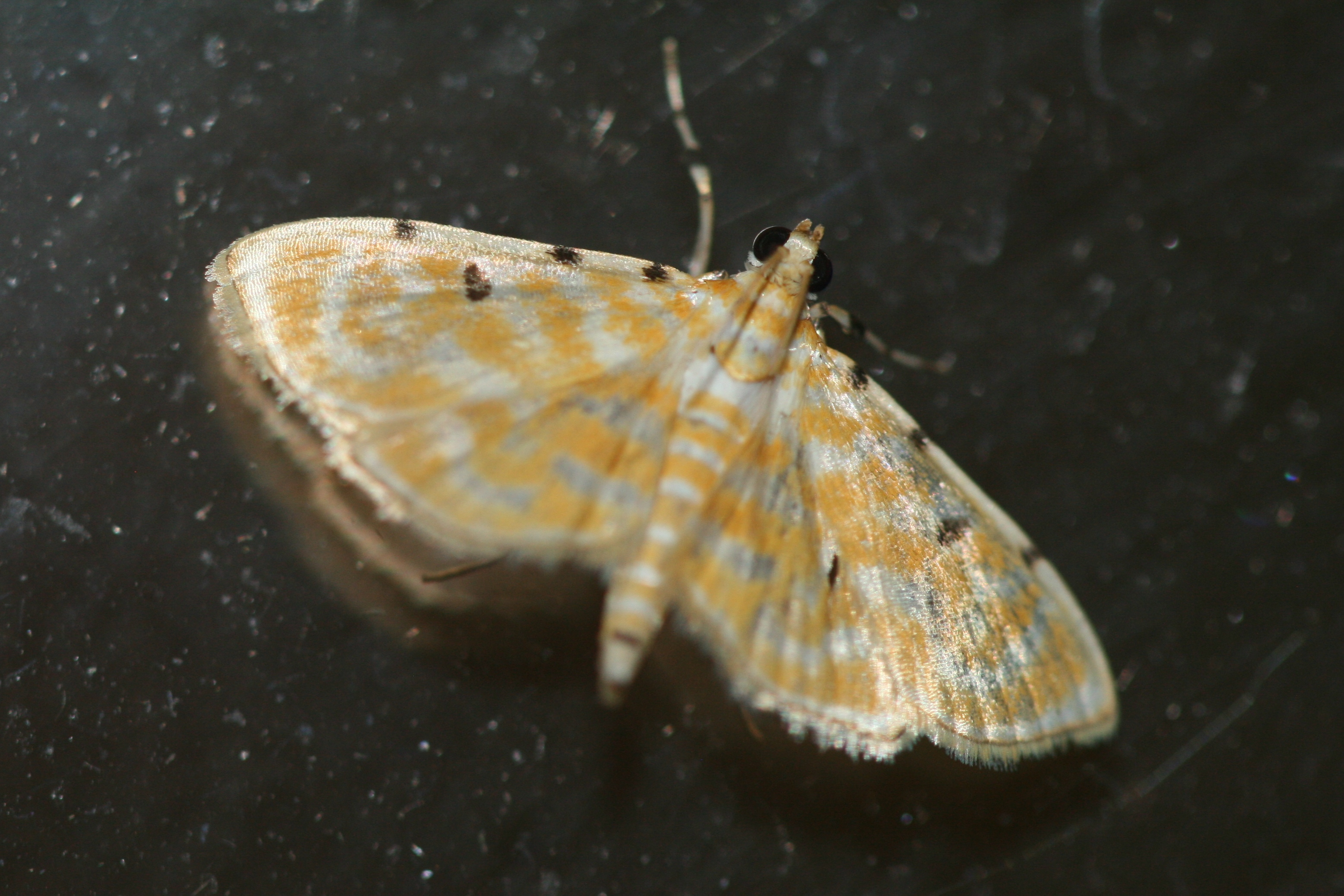
- Notarcha aurolinealis

Scientific classification
- Kingdom: Animalia
- Phylum: Arthropoda
- Class: Insecta
- Order: Lepidoptera
- Family: Crambidae
- Subfamily: Spilomelinae
- Tribe: Agroterini
- Genus: Notarcha; Meyrick, 1884

Synonyms
- Haritala Moore, 1886

= Notarcha =

Genus of moths

Notarcha is a genus of moths in the family Crambidae described by Edward Meyrick in 1884.

== Species ==
- Notarcha aurolinealis (Walker, 1859)
- Notarcha auroralis (Moore, 1888)
- Notarcha butyrina Meyrick, 1886
- Notarcha cassusalis (Walker, 1859)
- Notarcha chrysoplasta Meyrick, 1884
- Notarcha digitalis J. C. Shaffer & Munroe, 2007
- Notarcha halurga Meyrick, 1886
- Notarcha homomorpha Meyrick, 1894
- Notarcha muscerdalis Zeller, 1852
- Notarcha nigrofimbrialis (Snellen, 1880)
- Notarcha obrinusalis (Walker, 1859)
- Notarcha pactolica (Butler, 1887)
- Notarcha polytimeta (Turner, 1915)
- Notarcha quaternalis (Zeller, 1852)
- Notarcha recurrens (Moore, 1888)
- Notarcha stigmatalis Warren, 1896
- Notarcha temeratalis (Zeller, 1852)
- Notarcha tigrina (Moore, 1886)
- Notarcha viettalis (Marion, 1956)

== Former species ==
- Notarcha penthodes Meyrick, 1902
