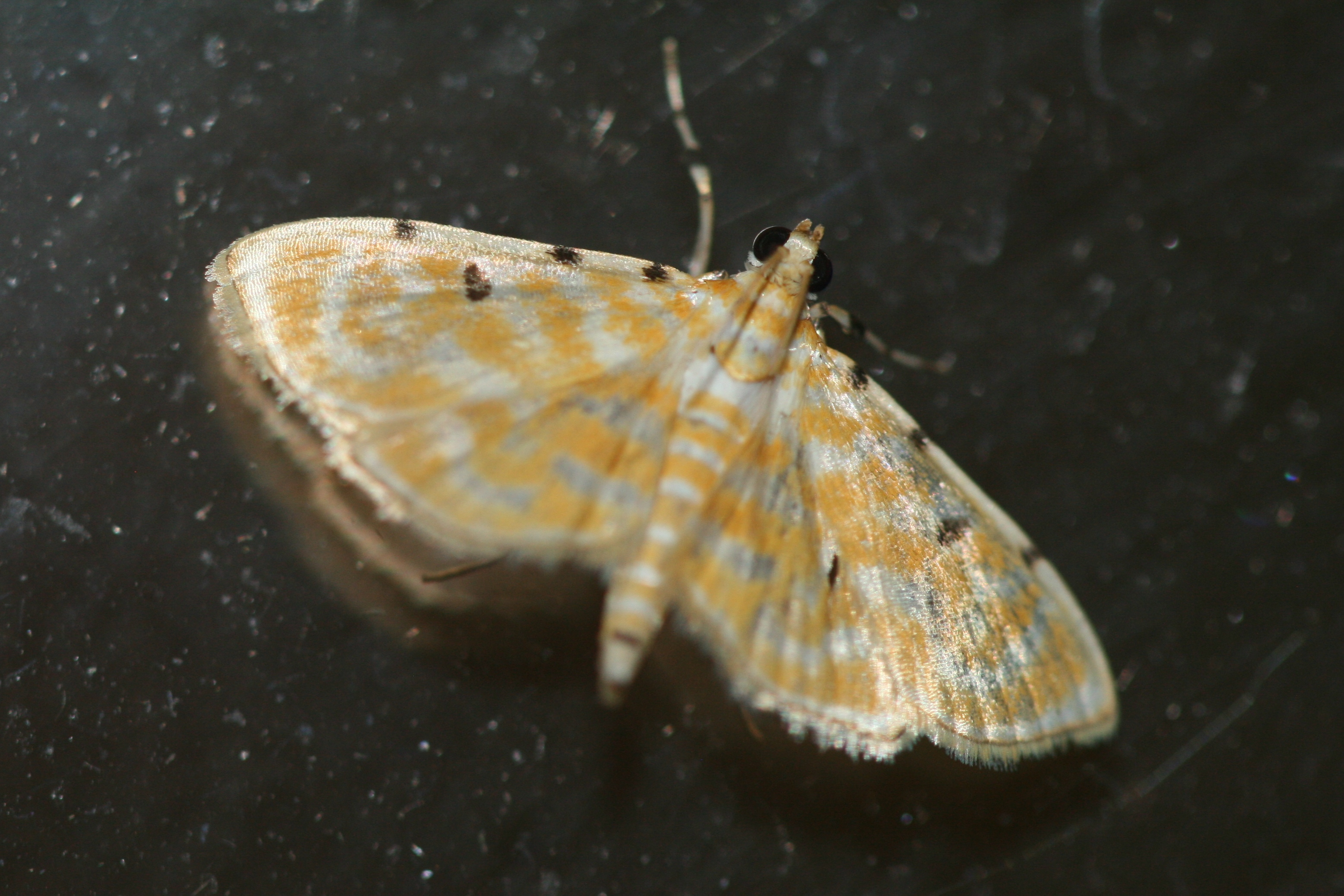

Scientific classification
- Kingdom: Animalia
- Phylum: Arthropoda
- Class: Insecta
- Order: Lepidoptera
- Family: Crambidae
- Genus: Notarcha
- Species: N. aurolinealis

Binomial name
- Notarcha aurolinealis (Walker, 1859)

Synonyms
- Zebronia aurolinealis Walker, 1859; Botys faustalis Lederer, 1863; Zebronia amaenalis Walker, 1866; Haritala delicatalis Hampson, 1891; Lygropia quaternalis

= Notarcha aurolinealis =

Species of moth

Notarcha aurolinealis is a species of moth of the family Crambidae. It is found in Hong Kong, Thailand and New South Wales and Queensland in Australia.

The wingspan is about 20 mm.

The larvae feed on Sida rhombifolia.
