= Simplesse =

Whey protein concentrate

Simplesse is a multi-functional dairy ingredient made from whey protein concentrate used as a fat substitute in low-calorie foods. Originally brought to market in 1988, the manufacturer, CP Kelco (a former NutraSweet subsidiary), sells Simplesse to food processors as a "microparticulated whey protein concentrate" in dry powder form, and recommends that it be labelled as dairy protein on food labels. Older versions of the product also contain egg whites.

The protein is partially coagulated by heat, creating a micro dispersion, in a process known as microparticulation. It is due to the small particle size of the protein that the dispersion is perceivable as a fluid with similar creaminess and richness of fat.

== History ==
Simplesse began in 1979 as "a substance that gelled like egg white but crumbled like Styrofoam." At that time, Shoji Yamamoto, an associate of Norman S. Singer at Canadian beer company John Labatt Ltd. in London, Ontario, brought Singer the whey protein substance. After sensing that it gave the taste texture of cream cheese, another scientist put a sample under a powerful microscope and saw "tiny spheres of protein rolling over each other" about a tenth the size of particles of powdered sugar. It was this particle rolling action that gave a smooth creaminess sensation. Another associate of Singer, scientist Nina Davis, worked for three years with Simplesse (then called microcurd) to adapt it to and incorporate it into many different food products. After Singer's boss observed that the product tasted like cheesecake, Singer filed for and received a United States patent for his efforts with the product. Labatt licensed the product to NutraSweet, a subsidiary of Creve Coeur, Missouri, United States chemical conglomerate Monsanto, in 1984. The product was given the trademark "Simplesse" in January 1988. An initial version of the product, approved for use in frozen desserts like low-fat ice cream substitutes by the U.S. Food and Drug Administration (FDA), was introduced to the public about that same time as being "the first completely natural fat substitute." The FDA approved a second version of the product in 1991 for use in salad dressings, butter, and baked goods.

== Product ==
Simplesse is a protein-based fat substitute derived from milk proteins that allows calorie reductions of up to 80 percent compared with foods that contain fat. Described in a United States patent abstract as "a proteinaceous, water-dispersible, macrocolloid comprising substantially non-aggregated particles of dairy whey protein," Simplesse particles are so minute that a person's tongue perceives the texture of the substitute as being smooth and creamy. Its texture is due to its ability to form a colloid, similar to the way fat is dispersed in homogenized milk. It differs from other whey protein concentrate mainly by virtue of the principles of food rheology; it is produced by a mechanical, rather than a chemical process. However, when heated such as by frying, the ingredients in the faux fat begin to gel similar to egg whites so the product mostly is used in ice cream, butter, spread cheeses, sour cream and dips, oil-based products such as salad dressings and mayonnaise, and other products that do not involve cooking.

== Application ==
Simplesse is used in ice cream, yogurt, cheese spread, salad dressings, margarine, mayonnaise, coffee creamer, soups, and sauces.

According to the Canadian Food Inspection Agency (CFIA), the common name of Simplesse for use in the list of ingredients of a food depends on the form of Simplesse used in the final product. If the Simplesse is made from egg white and milk protein, then the common name must appear in the list of ingredients as "egg and milk protein". The trade name "Simplesse" may appear in brackets following "egg and milk protein". An earlier suggested common name "microparticulated protein" is no longer required. If Simplesse is actually "whey protein concentrate", it may be described as either "whey protein concentrate" or "modified milk ingredient" (section B.01.010 (3) (b) item 7.1, of the Food and Drug Regulations) in the list of ingredients. In either case, the trade name "Simplesse" may appear in brackets following it. (09/MA/90; 20/MR/92; 06/NO/92; MA 25/94.) Date modified: 2012-09-21

== Nutritional fact ==
Simplesse is digested as a protein, but due to the micro dispersion formed, it produces only 1.0 to 1.3 Cal/g as opposed to 9.0 Cal/g that produces regular fat. Consuming Simplesse gives the possibility of maintaining the rich texture of the product by avoiding the high calorie intake. Simplesse allows the consumer to feel satiety just as when consuming regular fat.
