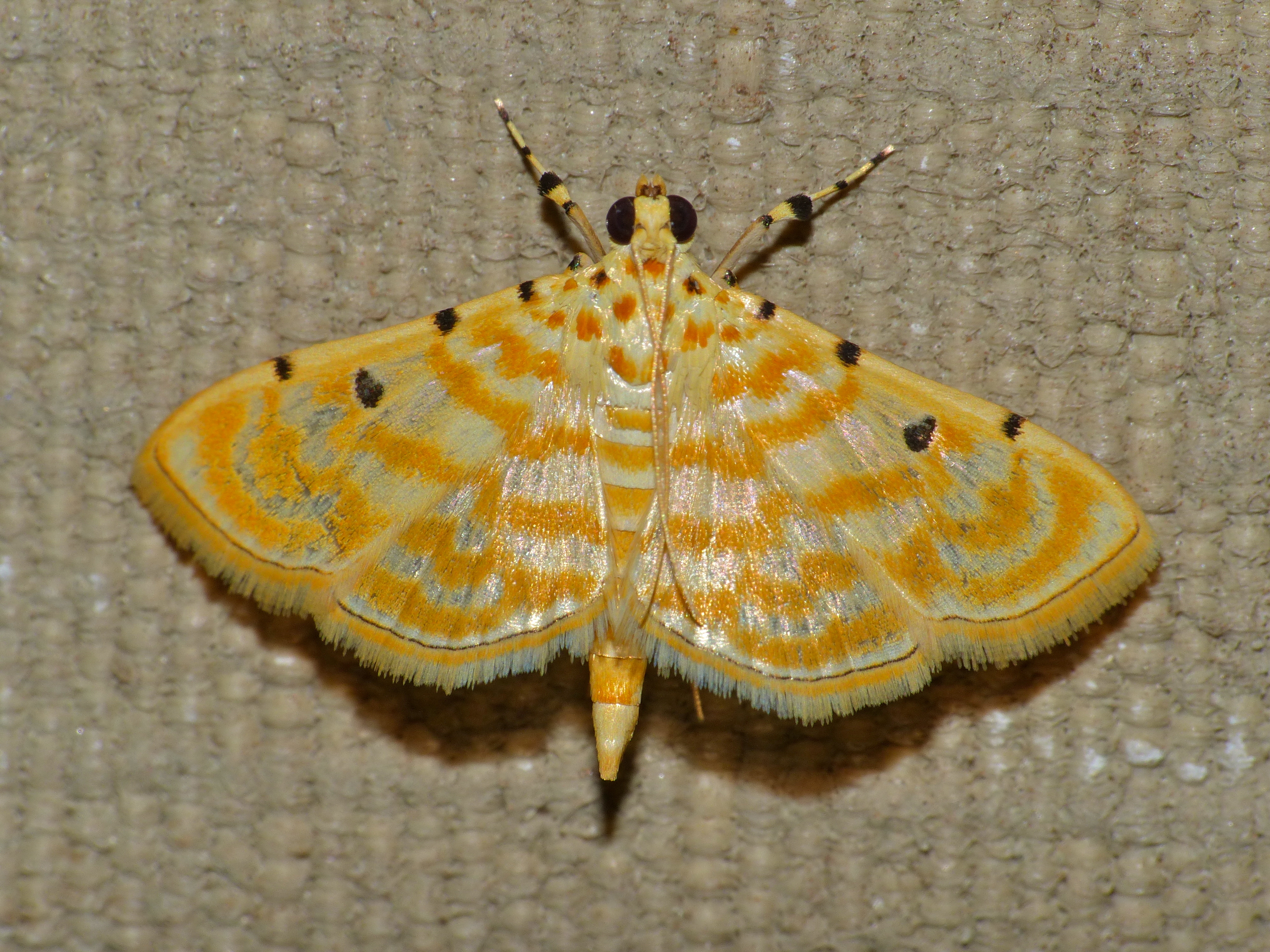

Scientific classification
- Kingdom: Animalia
- Phylum: Arthropoda
- Clade: Pancrustacea
- Class: Insecta
- Order: Lepidoptera
- Family: Crambidae
- Genus: Notarcha
- Species: N. quaternalis

Binomial name
- Notarcha quaternalis (Zeller, 1852)

Synonyms
- Botys quaternalis Zeller, 1852

= Notarcha quaternalis =

Species of moth

Notarcha quaternalis is a species of moth in the family Crambidae. It can be found throughout Sub-Saharan Africa including many islands of the Indian Ocean.

This moth is yellow/white with some black spots at the foreside of the forewings. Its wingspan is around 18mm. The larvae are dark green with a dark brown/black head. Hostplants of this species are Malvaceae (Sida sp., Sida carpinifolia)
