= Lay's Stax =

Stackable chips made by Lay's

- Logo for Lay's Stax, introduced in 2025

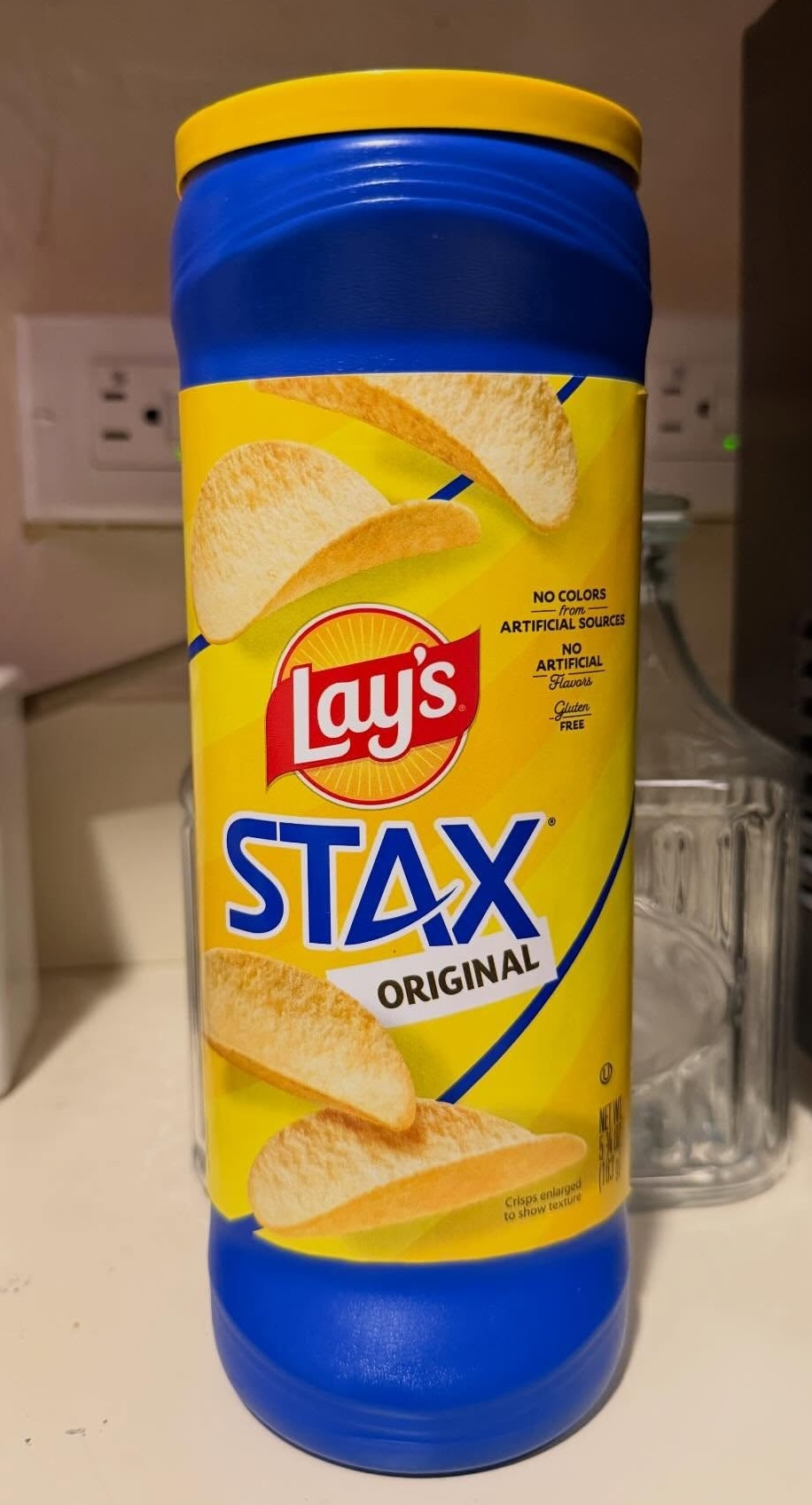
- An example of Original flavor Lay's Stax in the original plastic canister
- Product type: Potato chip
- Current owner: PepsiCo
- Produced by: Frito-Lay
- Country: United States
- Introduced: 2003; 23 years ago
- Website: lays.com/stax

Lay's Stax is a stacked variant of the Lay's potato chip brand produced by Frito-Lay, a subsidiary of PepsiCo. It was introduced in 2003 as direct competition for Procter & Gamble's (later Kellogg's in 2012 and Kellanova in 2024) Pringles.

== Stax compared to Pringles ==
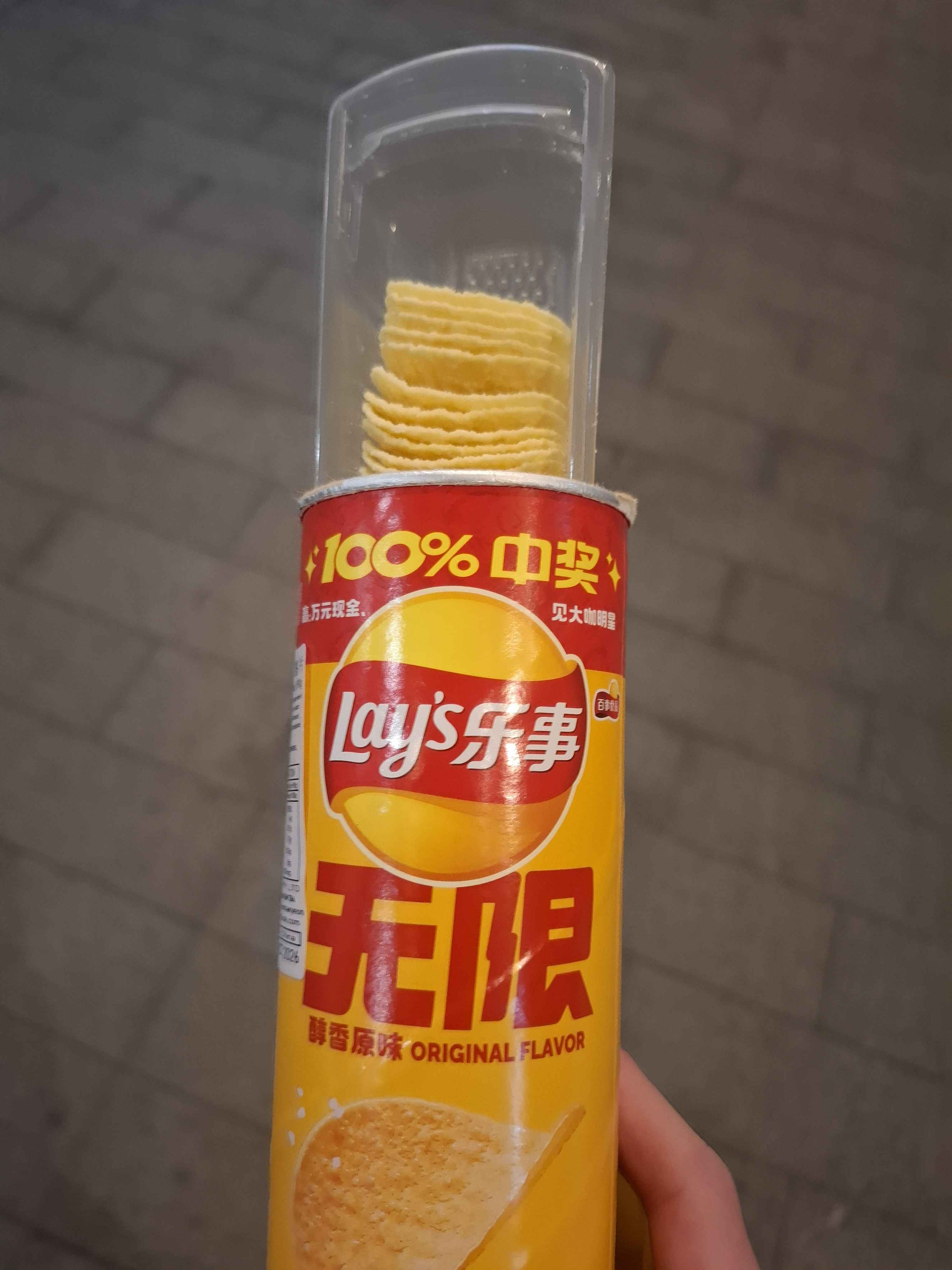
Lay's Stax as sold in Yinchuan, China. In China, Lay's are packaged in a cardboard canister with a plastic tray inside to make reaching the inside of the tube easier

Lay's Stax are heavier and thicker than Pringles. The shape of Stax is a simple curve called a hyperbolic cylinder, while Pringles are formed into a double-curve known as a hyperbolic paraboloid. Stax have the flavoring spread across the inside curve of the chip while Pringles have them across the outside curve. In the United States, Stax are packaged in plastic canisters while Pringles are packaged in canisters made of cardboard and aluminum.

The brand is usually packaged in different types of cans depending on the region with the United States, Canada and the Middle East having a bright blue colored plastic can with a yellow lid, designed to be easier to reach than traditional cylindrical stacked potato chips.

In Southeast Asia and China, Lay's Stax is packaged in a cardboard cylinder with a plastic tray inside.

== Rebranding ==
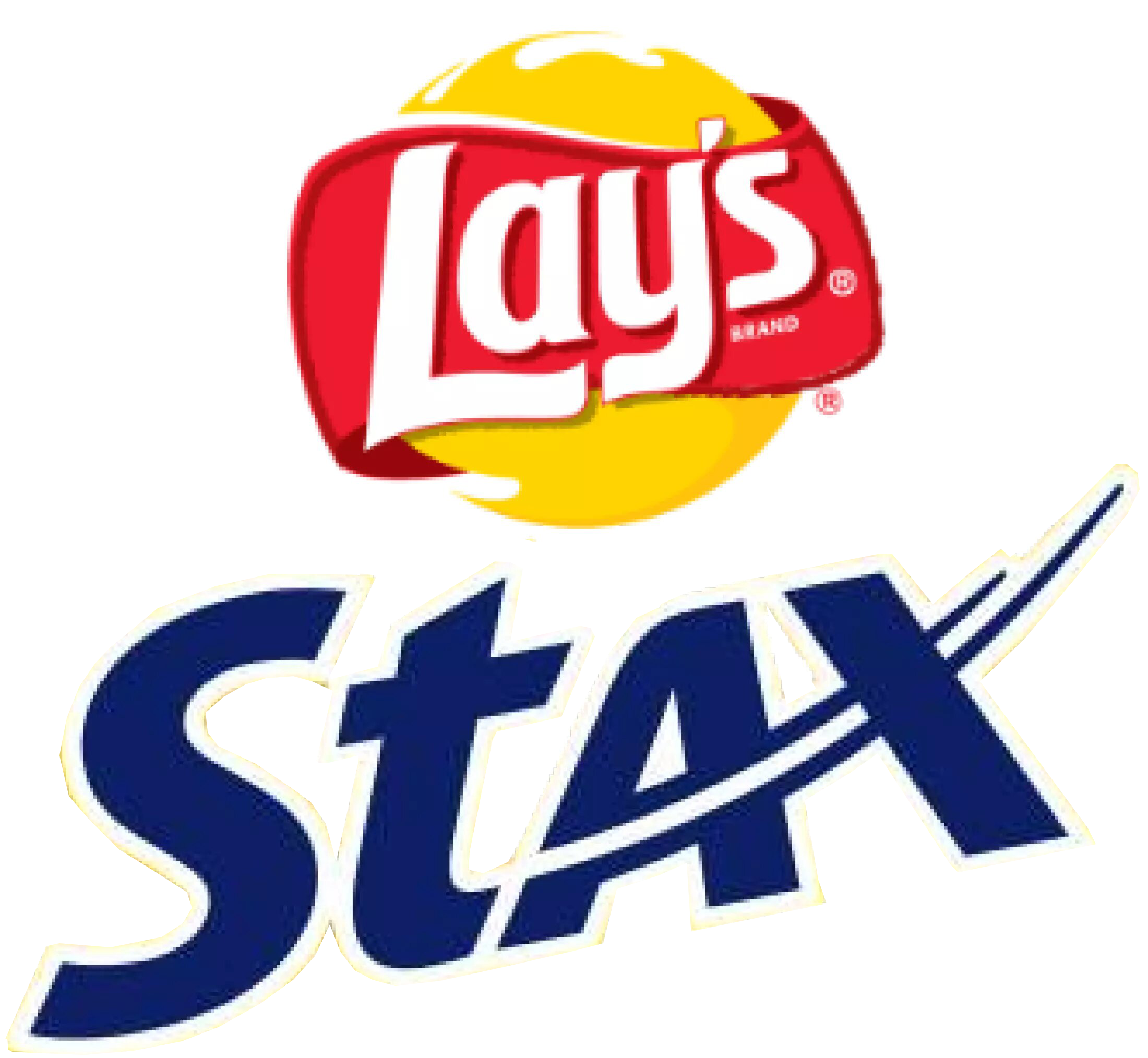
Former logo that is still seen on the lids of plastic cans

Whereas in nations such as China Lay's Stax are branded under the same name they were created and are primarily distributed, in some nations the chips are named differently.

Since late 2006, Lay's Stax have been available in Brazil under the name "Elma Chips Stax", deriving their name from that of a Brazilian division of the PepsiCo corporation known as Elma Chips. However, the yellow lids atop the cans are marked with the Lay's Stax brand name typical in most other regions of the world.

== See also ==
- Munchos
- List of brand name snack foods
