= Lay's Replay Field (Santa Ana) =

Soccer venue in Santa Ana, California

Coordinates: 33.7493°N 117.9126°W

Lay's Replay
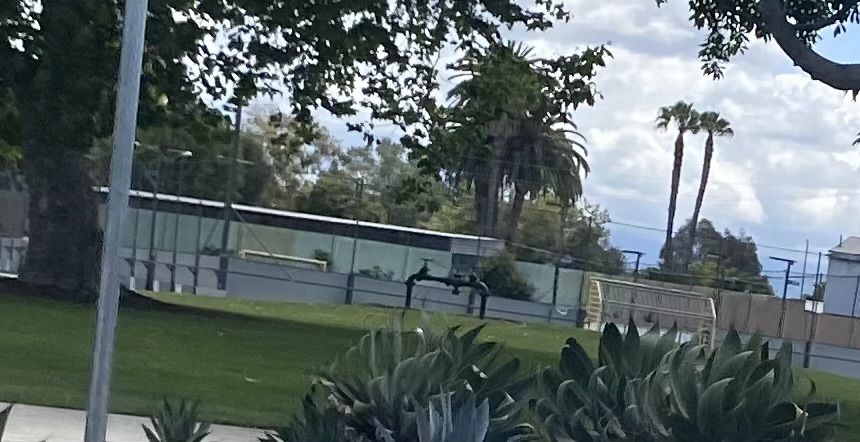
- Interactive map of Lay's Replay
- Location: 5th Street; Santa Ana; United States
- Surface: Artificial turf; mixed recycled chip bag and plastic

Construction
- Groundbreaking: March 14, 2023; 3 years ago
- Opened: 19 April 2023; 3 years ago

The Lay's Replay Field in Santa Ana, California, is a soccer field located in Cesar Chavez Campesino Park. It is the first Lay's Replay Field built in the United States and the sixth built worldwide. The field was built using recycled Lay's chip bags.

== History ==
The soccer field was announced on March 14, 2023, and construction started March 15, 2023. On April 19, 2023, around a month after construction had started, Lay's, alongside soccer players Mia Hamm and Javier Hernández, announced the opening of the field. Hernandez called the field and program a "game-changer" for Hispanic and Latin American communities in and around Santa Ana, following health problems and difficulties with the Hispanic/Latin American community in Santa Ana, who were struck hard after the COVID-19 pandemic.
