= Notarcha nigrofimbrialis =

Scientific classification
- Kingdom: Animalia
- Phylum: Arthropoda
- Class: Insecta
- Order: Lepidoptera
- Family: Crambidae
- Genus: Notarcha
- Species: N. nigrofimbrialis

Binomial name
- Notarcha nigrofimbrialis (Snellen, 1880)

Synonyms
- Botys nigrofimbrialis Snellen, 1880

Species of moth

Notarcha nigrofimbrialis is a moth in the family Crambidae. It was described by Snellen in 1880. It is found on Sumatra.
