= Notarcha cassusalis =

Scientific classification
- Kingdom: Animalia
- Phylum: Arthropoda
- Class: Insecta
- Order: Lepidoptera
- Family: Crambidae
- Genus: Notarcha
- Species: N. cassusalis

Binomial name
- Notarcha cassusalis (Walker, 1859)

Synonyms
- Zebronia cassusalis Walker, 1859; Notarcha cassalis Meyrick, 1884

Species of moth

Notarcha cassusalis is a moth in the family Crambidae. It was described by Francis Walker in 1859. It is found in South Africa and the Gambia.
