= Notarcha homomorpha =

Scientific classification
- Kingdom: Animalia
- Phylum: Arthropoda
- Class: Insecta
- Order: Lepidoptera
- Family: Crambidae
- Genus: Notarcha
- Species: N. homomorpha

Binomial name
- Notarcha homomorpha Meyrick, 1894

Species of moth

Notarcha homomorpha is a moth in the family Crambidae. It was described by Edward Meyrick in 1894. It is found on Borneo.
