= Notarcha viettalis =

Scientific classification
- Domain: Eukaryota
- Kingdom: Animalia
- Phylum: Arthropoda
- Class: Insecta
- Order: Lepidoptera
- Family: Crambidae
- Genus: Notarcha
- Species: N. viettalis

Binomial name
- Notarcha viettalis (Marion, 1956)

Synonyms
- Haritala viettalis Marion, 1956; Lygropia viettalis

Species of moth

Notarcha viettalis is a moth in the family Crambidae. It was described by Hubert Marion in 1956. It is found on Madagascar.
