= Notarcha stigmatalis =

Scientific classification
- Domain: Eukaryota
- Kingdom: Animalia
- Phylum: Arthropoda
- Class: Insecta
- Order: Lepidoptera
- Family: Crambidae
- Genus: Notarcha
- Species: N. stigmatalis

Binomial name
- Notarcha stigmatalis Warren, 1896

Species of moth

Notarcha stigmatalis is a moth in the family Crambidae. It was described by Warren in 1896. It is found in India (Meghalaya).
