= Notarcha temeratalis =

Scientific classification
- Kingdom: Animalia
- Phylum: Arthropoda
- Clade: Pancrustacea
- Class: Insecta
- Order: Lepidoptera
- Family: Crambidae
- Genus: Notarcha
- Species: N. temeratalis

Binomial name
- Notarcha temeratalis (Zeller, 1852)

Synonyms
- Botys temeratalis Zeller, 1852

Species of moth

Notarcha temeratalis is a moth in the family Crambidae. It was described by Zeller in 1852. It is found in Sierra Leone and South Africa.There is no listed species like this.
