= Notarcha pactolica =

Scientific classification
- Domain: Eukaryota
- Kingdom: Animalia
- Phylum: Arthropoda
- Class: Insecta
- Order: Lepidoptera
- Family: Crambidae
- Genus: Notarcha
- Species: N. pactolica

Binomial name
- Notarcha pactolica (Butler, 1887)

Synonyms
- Haritala pactolica Butler, 1887

Species of moth

Notarcha pactolica is a moth in the family Crambidae. It was described by Arthur Gardiner Butler in 1887. It is found in the Solomon Islands.
