= Croky =

Belgian snack food brand

Croky is a Belgian brand of snack foods, owned by the Mouscron based family-owned company Roger & Roger. The production of Croky chips debuted in 1966 in the old days of the Huyghe family in the surroundings of Ypres. It was named after the family parrot which has been a mascot for the Croky brand.

The company was acquired by United Biscuits of Britain in 1972. Chips were produced by United Biscuits in a factory located in Furnes in Belgium in 1998. In 1998, PepsiCo purchased the Croky brand rights in France. On the orders of the European Competition Authority, the Croky brand for the Benelux market and the Dutch factory in Deventer remained in the hands of United Biscuits. In France, PepsiCo removed the Croky brand in 2003, replacing it with the global brand Lay's. The Huyghe family then bought the rights to the brand with their own capital as Roger & Roger, and Croky crisps have been produced again in Belgium, in Mouscron. The Deventer factory closed in 2006.

From 2015, Croky began sponsoring the Belgian Cup in football.
