= Z-Trim =

Z-Trim was originally developed as a fat substitute by the U.S. Department of Agriculture made of natural dietary fibers. It is currently licensed for manufacture to Z-Trim Holdings.

This product was created as a health and diet aid; it has no calories since it consists of dietary fiber which cannot be digested by the human body, is natural, and can greatly reduce the fat in foods "with little or no change in flavor or texture," according to a review by Consumer Reports. Some schools have begun to use the product in their cafeterias, where it has been popular with students.
