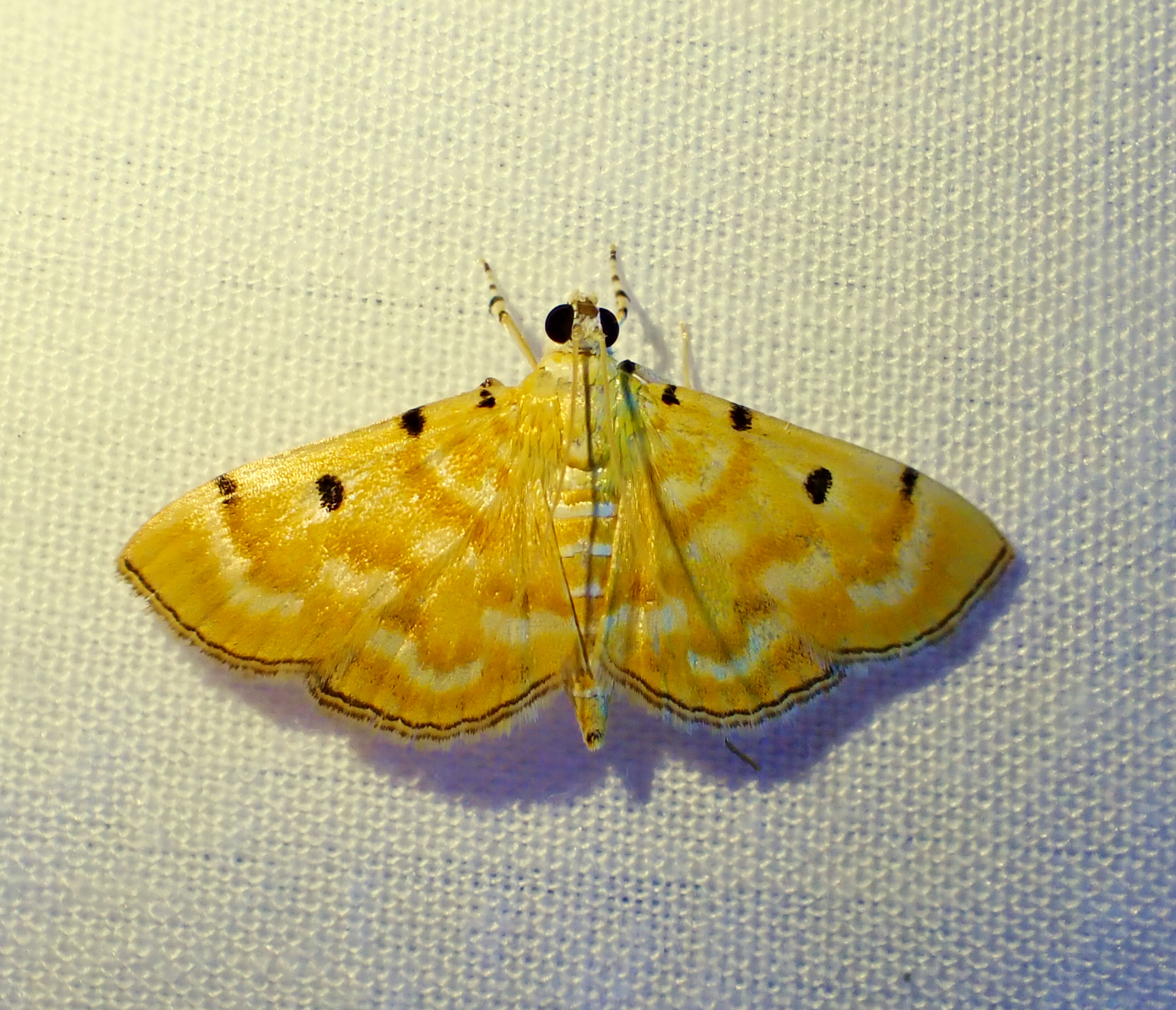

Scientific classification
- Kingdom: Animalia
- Phylum: Arthropoda
- Class: Insecta
- Order: Lepidoptera
- Family: Crambidae
- Genus: Notarcha
- Species: N. obrinusalis

Binomial name
- Notarcha obrinusalis (Walker, 1859)

Synonyms
- List: Astura obrinusalis Walker, 1859; Botys trigalis Lederer, 1863; Lygropia obrinusalis fa teneralis Caradja, 1932; Astura obrinalis Lederer, 1863; Pionea nigripunctalis Fawcett, 1916; Zebronia graphicalis Swinhoe, 1886

= Notarcha obrinusalis =

Species of moth

Notarcha obrinusalis is a species of moth in the family Crambidae. It was described by Francis Walker in 1859. It is found in Democratic Republic of the Congo (North Kivu, Katanga), Zambia, China, India and Indonesia (Borneo, Moluccas).

The larvae have been recorded feeding on Zea mays, as well as Gramineae, Leguminosae and Polygonaceae species.
