= Notarcha polytimeta =

Scientific classification
- Kingdom: Animalia
- Phylum: Arthropoda
- Clade: Pancrustacea
- Class: Insecta
- Order: Lepidoptera
- Family: Crambidae
- Genus: Notarcha
- Species: N. polytimeta

Binomial name
- Notarcha polytimeta (Turner, 1915)

Synonyms
- Sylepta polytimeta Turner, 1915

Species of moth

Notarcha polytimeta is a moth in the family Crambidae. It was described by Turner in 1915. It is found in Australia, where it has been recorded from Queensland and the Northern Territory.

The larvae feed on Brachychiton bidwillii.
