= Caprenin =

Dietary fat substitute

Caprenin is a fat substitute designed for lowering the caloric content of food. Structurally, it resembles normal food fat, being made up of glycerol and fatty acids (behenic, capric, and caprylic acids). Caprenin contains about 4 kcal per gram, or about half the energy in traditional fats and oils. Caloric reduction results, in part, from incomplete absorption of the unusual fatty acids.

Caprenin was launched by Procter & Gamble as a cocoa butter replacement, but it proved difficult to use and appeared to increase serum cholesterol slightly, resulting in its withdrawal from the market in the mid-1990s.

It is used as a reduced-calorie substitute in soft candies and confectionery coatings.
