= Lay's Wow chips =

Discontinued American snack food

Lay's Wow Chips
- A bag of Nacho Cheesier Doritos WOW from 1998
- Place of origin: United States
- Created by: Frito-Lay
- Main ingredients: Potatoes, Olestra

Lay's Wow Chips were fat-free potato chips produced by Frito-Lay containing Olestra. They were first introduced in 1998, and were marketed using the Lay's, Ruffles, Doritos, and Tostitos brands. Although initially popular, charting sales of $400 million in their first year, they subsequently dropped to $200 million by 2000, as Olestra caused "abdominal cramping, diarrhea, fecal incontinence, and other gastrointestinal symptoms" in some customers. Warnings were required to be included on the packaging, with the WOW bag bearing a warning that read, "This Product Contains Olestra. Olestra may cause abdominal cramping and loose stools. Olestra inhibits the absorption of some vitamins and other nutrients. Vitamins A, D, E, and K have been added." Studies sponsored by Olestra's manufacturer, Procter & Gamble, contradicted many of the anecdotal reports of digestive symptoms, but did not increase public acceptance of products containing Olestra.

Frito-Lay eventually rebranded the WOW Chips to "Light". However, the products were discontinued in 2016.
