= Light beer =

Type of beer

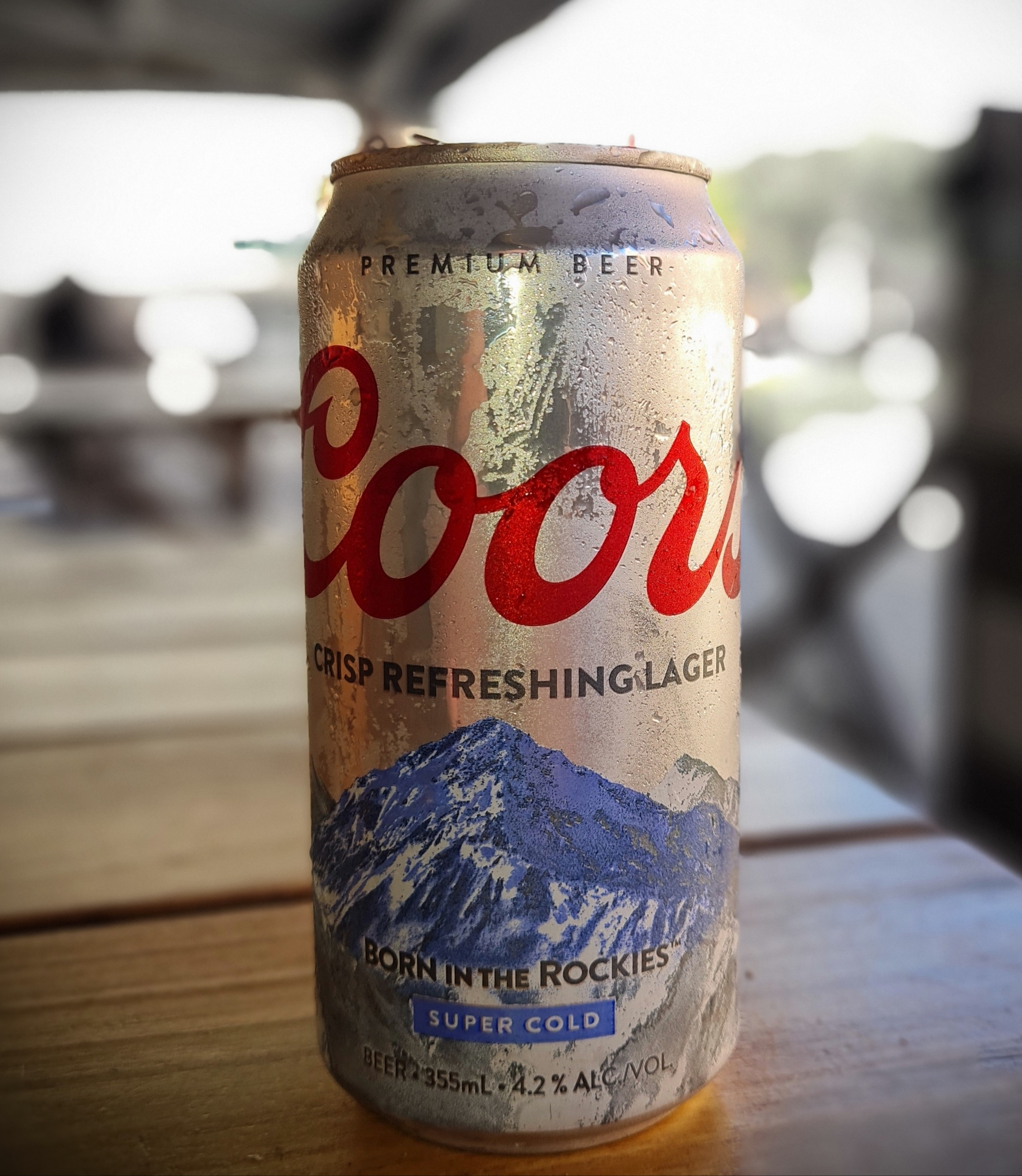
Coors Light, a common American light beer

Light beer is beer with lower calorie or alcohol content than other types of beer. In the United States, "light beer" is beer with reduced calorie content. Prior to the 1970s, "light beer" had other meanings in the United States. In Australia, Canada, and the United Kingdom "light beer" is beer with lower alcohol content than regular beer.

Reduced calorie light beer began to be mass marketed in the United States in the 1960s, but the first successful brand, Miller Lite, was not marketed nationally in the United States until 1975.

== History ==
Before the development of contemporary light beer, small beer had been brewed for centuries.

At various times "light beer" has referred in the United States to: (1) lager beer that was lighter tasting; (2) beer with lower alcohol content; or (3) beer light in color that was not dark or amber-colored. In Australia, Canada, and Scotland "light beer" is beer with lower alcohol content than regular beer.

In 1941 the Coors Brewing Company began selling a low-abv beer called Coors Light. It remained on the market for less than a year.

=== Modern light beer ===
The origins of today’s light beers can be traced to the mid-1960s.

In December 1966 Rheingold of New York began marketing a reduced calorie beer called Gablinger's Beer. Gablinger's was brewed using a process that Swiss chemist Dr. Hersch Gablinger claimed to have invented. Dr. Gablinger's process involved adding the enzyme amyloglucosidase during production which resulted in a beer that had one-third fewer calories and was less filling. Gablinger applied for patents on his process in Switzerland (in 1964) and in the United States (in 1965). After Rheingold officials traveled to Europe and sampled Dr. Gablinger's beer, Rheingold bought the exclusive rights to use his process. Rheingold biochemist and brewer Joseph L. Owades then developed Gablinger's Beer, which began to be test marketed in late 1966, and was rolled out in the New York City area in June 1967.

In May 1967 a second amyloglucosidase based light beer, Meister Brau Lite, was introduced by Chicago brewer Meister Brau, Inc. (formerly known as Peter Hand Brewery). Meister Brau spent two years developing the process to make Lite. Meister Brau obtained a trademark for "Lite" as the name of the beer.

August Wagner Breweries of Columbus, Ohio introduced a third amyloglucosidase derived light beer, Slim-Line Mark V, in September 1967.

In April 1968 the United States Patent Office granted Dr. Gablinger's application for a patent on his amyloglucosidase process. Patent infringement litigation then ensued between Amylase A.G. (owner of Dr. Gablinger’s patent) and Rheingold, on the one hand, and Meister Brau and August Wagner on the other. Meister Brau and August Wagner claimed that the process was known and used by others before Gablinger applied for his patent and August Wagner further claimed that the process had been invented in the United States and was described in other patents. In March 1970 the United States District Court for the District of Columbia invalidated Gablinger’s patent.

By 1972 Meister Brau, Inc. was in dire financial straits, and in June of that year it sold its brands, including Lite, to the Miller Brewing Co. of Milwaukee.

Miller spent about a year reformulating Lite to give it more of a beer taste and it introduced new packaging. Most importantly, Miller adopted a new advertising strategy for the brand. Earlier brewers of light beer tried to appeal to health-conscious customers, many of whom were women, who were not heavy beer drinkers. After Miller discovered that Meister Brau Lite had sold well in Anderson, Indiana, even among hard-drinking factory workers, it decided to target heavy beer drinkers who wanted a lighter, less filling beer. In doing so it relied on techniques used by Miller’s parent company Philip Morris, Inc. in the 1950s when it successfully marketed Marlboro cigarettes to men who were initially reluctant to smoke filtered cigarettes. Miller introduced Lite in test markets in 1973 and it was rolled out nationally in 1975 backed by a massive advertising campaign. Advertising for Lite emphasized the pleasurable qualities of the beer – that it tasted great and was less filling – and used ex-athletes and other macho types to convey a masculine image. Miller Lite was a huge success - the most popular new product in the history of the American beer industry - and competitors scrambled to introduce their own light beers. Sales of light beer in the United States went from a negligible amount before Miller Lite to forty-four percent of the United States beer market by 2002.

== Reduced calories ==
Reducing the caloric content of beer is accomplished primarily by reducing its main contributors, carbohydrates and ethyl alcohol. Unlike reduced-alcohol light beers produced for those restricting their alcohol intake, the alcohol reduction in this type of light beer is not primarily intended to produce a less intoxicating beverage.

This is the primary definition in the United States, where popular light beers include Bud Light, Miller Lite, and Coors Light.

=== Methods of manufacture ===
After the normal brewing process, small starch fragments called dextrins remain in the finished beer because they cannot be broken down into fermentable sugar by the enzymes that are naturally present in barley malt. These dextrins are digested as carbohydrates and give beer about one-third of its calories and some body. Brewers make reduced calorie beer by reducing the dextrins (carbohydrates) in light beer and some brewers also reduce the alcohol content. Brewers typically use one of three processes, or combinations of them, to make light beer.

The first process involves adding the enzyme amyloglucosidase prior to fermentation. Amyloglucosidase converts the dextrins into fermentable sugar. This process eliminates the dextrins and reduces the carbohydrates found in 12 ounces of beer from around 14 grams to less than 3 grams The reduction in carbohydrates also makes the beer less filling. Since this process increases the available fermentable sugar, it initially produces a higher alcohol beer but brewers add carbonated water to bring the alcohol level down to a normal level. Amyloglucosidase is found naturally in the human digestive system, but it is not found in barley malt. Miller Lite and Coors Light are made using amyloglucosidase.

The second method uses high amylase barley malt and a longer saccharification period during the mashing process which converts more starch into fermentable sugar. (Amylase enzymes are found naturally in barley malt). This process is capable of producing beers with carbohydrates reduced to about 6 or 7 grams per 12 ounces. Anheuser-Busch light beers are made using this process.

The third process reduces the amount of barley malt used and replaces it with high dextrose corn syrup. Since the corn syrup is made using enzymes that convert the corn starches to sugars, the syrup contributes little or no carbohydrates to the finished beer. Carbohydrate levels can be reduced by more than 50% using this method. Pabst Light has been made using this process.

== Reduced alcohol ==
Low-alcohol light beer is brewed specifically for those seeking to limit their alcohol consumption for medical, social, legal, or other reasons. Its lower proof allows consumers to drink more beers in a shorter period without becoming intoxicated. Low alcohol content can also result in a less expensive beer, especially where excise is determined by alcohol content.

This is the primary definition of the term in countries such as Australia, Canada, and Scotland. In Australia, regular beers have approximately 5% alcohol by volume; light beers may have 2.2–3.2% alcohol. In Scotland, the term derives from shilling categories, where 'light' customarily means a beer with less than 3.5% alcohol by volume.

== See also ==
- Diet drink
- Fat substitute
