= Vitaly Butyrin =

Soviet and Lithuanian photographer (1947–2020)

Vitaly Butyrin (May 30, 1947 in Kaunas – October 30, 2020 in Vilnius) was a Soviet and Lithuanian photographer.
