= Hostess Potato Chips =

Brand of potato chips

Hostess Munchies

- Product type: Potato chips
- Current owner: PepsiCo
- Produced by: Frito–Lay
- Country: Canada
- Introduced: 1935; 2024; 2 years ago (revival)
- Discontinued: 1996; 30 years ago (rebranded to Lay's)
- Related brands: Lay's
- Markets: Canada
- Previous owners: Hostess Food Products (1935–59); General Foods (1959–92)
- Website: munchies.ca

Hostess, also known as Munchies from 2024, is a potato chip brand that was the leading brand in Canada for many years after its creation in 1935. During its heyday, they fended off any attempt to displace them from their commanding position, and maintained their #1 position into the 1980s, even in the face of increased competition from US-based companies entering the Canadian market before eventually leading to a merger with US based Lay's in 1988.

By the early 1990s, Hostess suffered serious brand erosion and competition with the introduction of various "upscale" brands such as Kettle Chips and Miss Vickie's. The brand was replaced by the multi-national Lay's banner in 1996 as part of its major re-branding exercise. As of 2026, the Hostess brand is used only on a few products. The brand was revived in 2024 as Munchies.

== History ==
=== Beginnings ===
Hostess was formed in 1935 when Edward Snyder began cooking chips on his mother's kitchen stove in Breslau, Ontario, outside Kitchener, Ontario. Potato chips remained a fairly small part of the snack food market until the 1950s, when snack foods in general became more widely available. In 1955, Snyder sold his company to E.W. Vanstone, who expanded the company greatly before selling his interest to General Foods in 1959.

Starting in 1981, the chips had new mascots known as the Munchies, that were used for advertisements and appeared on the chip packaging. The Munchies were designed and created by Richard Siu, a Canadian artist. The Munchies were three friendly, goblin-like creatures coloured red, orange, and yellow.

=== New chapter ===
The back of the bags of the 2007 line of Hostess Potato Chips.

The introduction of corn chips to the market led to a partnership between Hostess and Frito-Lay (owned by PepsiCo) in 1987, bringing Doritos to Canada for the first time (Doritos were in Canada in the late 1970s). This move was followed by the introduction of other Frito Lay brands, including Ruffles, Tostitos and Cheetos (Lay's, Frito Lay's major US chip brand, was already being licensed for Canadian manufacture by another company). Hostess remained the major chip brand in Canada even after the arrangement. The partnership led to a merger in 1988, with the joint company known as Hostess Frito Lay. In 1992, PepsiCo acquired full ownership of Hostess by buying out Kraft General Foods' remaining interest.

=== Decline and return ===
With the brand popularity falling, it was decided to re-brand the product as Lay's in 1996. This change presented no small amount of difficulty, as the product was already on sale in Canada via a third party. An aggressive advertising campaign by BBDO Canada featuring famous hockey players such as Mark Messier and Eric Lindros launched the "new" brand in 1997, and within eighteen months Lay's was selling twice the volume of products that it had been under the Hostess moniker. Hostess largely disappeared, and the company dropped "Hostess" from its name, becoming Frito Lay Canada.

The only remaining major Hostess retail product was Hickory Sticks, a flavoured potato stick brand which maintains broad distribution on par with other Lay's Canada brands.

In 2021, Frito-Lay reintroduced the salt and vinegar variety of Hickory Sticks in an unusually shaped bag for chips, being wider than it is tall.

In September 2024, Frito-Lay reintroduced the Munchies characters with a new snack brand named Munchies. Unlike Hostess, Munchies also includes tortilla chips and flavoured popcorn in its lineup.

== Marketing ==
During its existence, the slogan for Hostess chips was "'Cause when you've got the munchies, nothing else will do. Hostess Potato Chips!"
