= Notarcha butyrina =

Scientific classification
- Kingdom: Animalia
- Phylum: Arthropoda
- Class: Insecta
- Order: Lepidoptera
- Family: Crambidae
- Genus: Notarcha
- Species: N. butyrina

Binomial name
- Notarcha butyrina Meyrick, 1886

Species of moth

Notarcha butyrina is a moth in the family Crambidae. It was described by Edward Meyrick in 1886. It is found in Fiji.
