= Fat substitute =

Food product used in place of fats

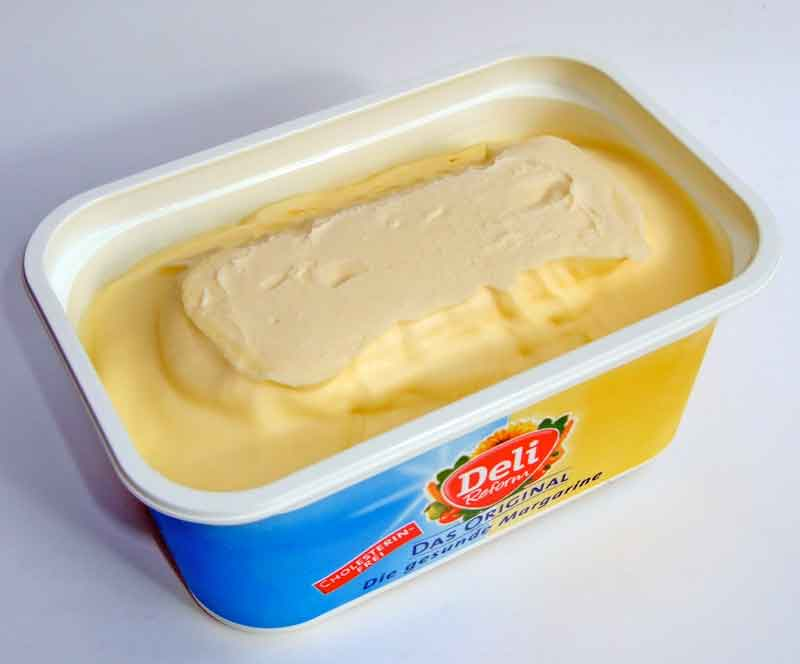
Margarine

A fat substitute is a food product with the same functions, stability, physical, and chemical characteristics as regular fat, with fewer calories per gram than fat. They are utilized in the production of low fat and low calorie foods.

== Background ==
Fat is present in most foods. It provides a unique texture, flavor, and aroma to the food it is found in. While fat is essential to life, it can be detrimental to health when consumed in excess of physiological requirements. High fat diets increase risk of heart disease, weight gain, and some cancers. High blood cholesterol is more prevalent in those that consume diets high in saturated fats, and it increases risk for coronary heart disease in those individuals. The use of fat substitutes in food products allows for maintenance of the food’s original quality characteristics without the associated risks of fat consumption. In the absence of energy-dense fat molecules, products utilizing fat substitutes are generally lower in calories than their full-fat counterparts.

== Applications ==
Fat substitutes can be divided into four categories based on the food component from which they are derived, as shown in Figure 1.

Category	Type and example	Function
Carbohydrate-based	Cellulose (Vivapur); Dextrins, modified starches (Stellar); Fruit-based fibre (WonderSlim); Grain-based fibre (Betatrim); Hydrocolloid gums; Maltodextrin (Maltrin); Pectin (Grinsted)	Binder, body, bulk, flavor, moisture retention, mouth feel
Protein-based	Microparticulate protein (Simplesse); Modified whey protein concentrate (Dairy-Lo)	Mouth feel, water-binding, reduce syneresis (separation of water from other constituents, leading to loss of texture, spread characteristics, and mouth feel)
Fat-based	Altered triglycerides (Caprenin); Sucrose polyesters (Olestra); Esterified propoxylated glycerol (EPG)	Emulsion, mouth feel
Combination	Carbohydrate and protein (Mimix); Carbohydrate and fat (Optamax)	Flavour, texture, mouth feel, water retention

Figure 1: Categories of fat substitutes based on composition. Like fat itself, such compounds have a variety of functions in food products. Table adapted from the American Dietetic Association’s 2005 report on fat replacers.

== Potential benefits ==
Consumption of fat substitutes can assist in lowering total overall fat and calorie intake from foods. This has positive implications for those looking to reduce either one of these, especially when in a disease state associated with high fat diets. While fat substitution alone can reduce the percentage of kilocalories ingested from dietary fat, it may not reduce an individual’s total energy intake (in terms of kilocalories) unless the rest of the diet is of high quality and low energy density.

== Safety ==
Few concerns have been raised about the safety of fat substitutes. Carrageenan, olestra, and polydextrose have been approved by the U.S. Food and Drug Administration (FDA) for use as food additives, a title which requires both intensive testing over a wide demographic and the ability to meet strict, pre-determined, FDA criteria. Other products, such as guar gum and maltodextrose, are "generally recognized as safe (GRAS)" by the FDA; this is also based on scientific testing and long-term consumption by a variety of consumer demographics.

With excessive use, polydextrose can have a laxative effect, and olestra may cause loss of fat-soluble vitamins in the form of fatty stools and is liquid at body temperature.

Esterified propoxylated glycerol (EPG), which is a solid at body temperature, achieved GRAS status for confectionery uses in November, 2015. EPG's GRAS status expanded to use at levels up to 38 percent by weight in baked goods and baking mixes, frozen dairy desserts and mixes, grain products and pasta, gravies and sauces, nuts and nut products, and soft candy.

At this time, there is little supporting evidence to accompany claims that these, or other fat substitutes, are hazardous; however, more long-term research is needed.

== See also ==
- Z-Trim
- Diet drink
- Light beer
