= Olestra =

Fat substitute

- Top: Generic 2D structure of olestra, where R = H or fatty acid group, C(O)C_{n}H_{m} Bottom: Stereoscopic animation of a representative olestra molecule with 8 unsaturated fatty acid groups

Clinical data
- Trade names: Olean

Legal status
- Legal status: US: OTC

Identifiers
- CAS Number: 121854-29-3
- ChemSpider: none
- UNII: 6742Y30KGK
- CompTox Dashboard (EPA): DTXSID2021078

Chemical and physical data
- Formula: C_{n+12}H_{2n+22}O_{13} (where fatty acids are saturated)
- Molar mass: Variable

Olestra (also known by its brand name Olean) is a fat substitute food additive that adds no metabolizable calories to products. It has been used in the preparation of otherwise high-fat foods, thereby lowering or eliminating their fat content.

The Food and Drug Administration (FDA) approved olestra for use in the US as a replacement for fats and oils in prepackaged ready-to-eat snacks in 1996, concluding that such use "meets the safety standard for food additives, reasonable certainty of no harm". In the late 2000s, olestra lost popularity due to supposed side effects and is largely phased out, but products containing the ingredient are available in some countries. As of 2023, no products using olestra are sold in the United States.

== Commercialization ==
Olestra was discovered accidentally by Procter & Gamble (P&G) researchers F. Mattson and R. Volpenhein in 1968 while researching fats that could be more easily digested by premature infants. In 1971, P&G met with the Food and Drug Administration (FDA) to examine what sort of testing would be required to introduce olestra as a food additive.

During the following tests, P&G noticed a decline in blood cholesterol levels as a side effect of olestra replacing natural dietary fats. Following this potentially lucrative possibility, in 1975, P&G filed a new request with the FDA to use olestra as a "drug", specifically to lower cholesterol levels. The lengthy series of studies that followed failed, however, to demonstrate the 15% reduction required by the FDA to be approved as a treatment. Further work on Olestra languished.

In 1984, the FDA allowed Kellogg to claim publicly that their high-fiber breakfast cereals were effective in reducing the risk of cancer. P&G immediately started another test series that lasted three years. When these tests were completed, P&G filed for approval as a food additive for up to 35% replacement of fats in home cooking and 75% in commercial uses.

One of the main concerns the FDA had about olestra was it might encourage consumers to eat more of the "top of the pyramid" foods because of the perception of its being healthier. This could result in consumers engaging in over-consumption, thinking the addition of olestra would remove negative consequences. In light of this possibility, approving it as an additive would have meant consumers would be consuming a food with a relatively high amount of an additive, whose long-term health effects were not documented. This made the FDA particularly hesitant to approve the product, as well as the side effects, such as diarrhea, and concern for the loss of fat-soluble vitamins. In August 1990, P&G narrowed their focus to "savory snacks", potato chips, tortilla chips, crackers and similar foods.

By this point, the original patents were approaching their 1995 expiration. P&G lobbied for an extension, which they received in December 1993. This extension lasted until 25 January 1996. With pressure from P&G, the approval was finally granted on 24 January, one day before the patent expired, automatically extending the patent by two years.

At the time of the 1996 ruling, FDA concluded that, "to avoid being misbranded... olestra-containing foods would need to bear a label statement to inform consumers about possible effects of olestra on the gastrointestinal system. The label statement also would clarify that the added vitamins were present to compensate for any nutritional effects of olestra, rather than to provide enhanced nutritional value". The FDA later removed the label requirement saying that the "current label does not accurately communicate information to consumers". The FDA also agreed with P&G that the "label statement could be misleading and cause consumers of olestra to attribute serious problems to olestra when this was unlikely to be the case".

=== Discontinued products ===
Olestra was approved by the Food and Drug Administration for use as a food additive in 1996 and was initially used in potato chips under the WOW brand by Frito Lay. In 1998, the first year olestra products were marketed nationally after the FDA's Food Advisory Committee confirmed a judgment it made two years earlier, sales were over $400 million. By 2000, though, sales slowed to $200 million. P&G abandoned attempts to widen the uses of olestra and sold off its Cincinnati-based factory to Twin Rivers Technologies in February 2002. The WOW chips were rebranded to "Lay's Light" in 2004 and were discontinued by 2016.

Pringles Light potato crisps, manufactured by Kellogg's (though at one time a P&G product), used Olean-brand olestra before being discontinued in 2015.

== Side effects ==
Starting in 1996, an FDA-mandated health warning label reads "This Product Contains Olestra. Olestra may cause abdominal cramping and loose stools. Olestra inhibits the absorption of some vitamins and other nutrients. Vitamins A, D, E, and K have been added".

These symptoms, normally occurring only by excessive consumption in a short period of time, are known as steatorrhea and are caused by an excess of fat in stool.

The FDA removed the warning requirement in 2003, as it had "conducted a scientific review of several post-market studies submitted by P&G, as well as adverse event reports submitted by P&G and the Center for Science in the Public Interest. The FDA concluded the label statement was no longer warranted". The FDA also agreed with P&G that the "label statement could be misleading and cause consumers of olestra to attribute serious problems to olestra when this [was] unlikely to be the case".

When removing the olestra warning label requirement, the FDA cited a six-week P&G study of more than 3000 people showing the olestra-eating group experienced only a small increase in bowel movement frequency compared to the control group. The FDA concluded that "subjects eating olestra-containing chips were no more likely to report having had loose stools, abdominal cramps, or any other GI symptom compared to subjects eating an equivalent amount of [potato] chips".

In addition to the effects of the health warnings on public acceptance of the product, olestra might not have lived up to consumer expectations of speedy results. If consumers believed that they could eat more to compensate for the fat calories "saved", olestra would not be an effective way to improve overall diet. The manufacturers claim that the authentic taste and feel of olestra offsets this tendency, and some studies have shown that people who consume foods with olestra don't eat more to offset the loss in calories. P&G conducted publicity campaigns to highlight olestra's benefits, including working directly with the health-care community.

Olestra is prohibited from sale in many markets, including the European Union and Canada.

Consumption of olestra may encourage rats to eat too much of foods containing regular fats, due to the learning of an incorrect association between fat intake and calories. Rats that were fed regular potato chips as well as chips cooked with olestra gained more weight when subsequently eating a high-fat diet than rats that received just regular chips.

== Chemistry ==
Triglycerides, the energy-yielding dietary fats, consist of three fatty acids bonded in the form of esters to a glycerol backbone. Olestra uses sucrose as the backbone in place of glycerol, and it can form esters with up to eight fatty acids. Olestra is a mixture of hexa-, hepta-, and octa-esters of sucrose with various long chain fatty acids. The resulting radial arrangement is too large and irregular to move through the intestinal wall and be absorbed into the bloodstream. Olestra has the same taste and mouthfeel as fat, but it passes through the gastrointestinal tract undigested without contributing calories or nutritive value to the diet.

From a mechanical point of view, scientists were able to manipulate the compound in such a way that it could be used in place of cooking oils in the preparation of many types of food.

Since it contains fatty acid functional groups, olestra is able to dissolve lipid-soluble vitamins, such as vitamin D, vitamin E, vitamin K, and vitamin A, along with carotenoids. Fat-soluble nutrients consumed with olestra products are excreted with the undigested olestra molecules. To counteract this loss of nutrients, products made with olestra are fortified with oil-soluble vitamins.

== Applications ==
P&G is marketing its sucrose ester products under the brand "Sefose" for use as an industrial lubricant and paint additive. Because Sefose is made by chemically combining sugar and vegetable oil, it releases no toxic fumes and could potentially become a safe and environmentally friendly replacement for petrochemicals in these applications. It is currently used as a base for deck stains and a lubricant for small power tools, and there are plans to use it on larger machinery.

There is preliminary evidence that indicates that administration of olestra may accelerate the excretion of hydrophobic toxins, although there have been no randomized controlled clinical trials to establish the effectiveness of this potential treatment. Toxins that have been studied in conjunction with olestra treatment include dioxins, hexachlorobenzene, and polychlorinated biphenyls (PCBs).
