= Frito pie =

American savory dish

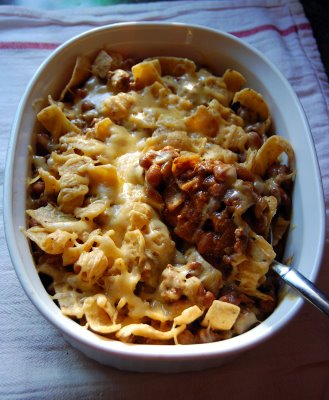
- Place of origin: United States
- Main ingredients: Chili con carne, cheese, corn chips (Fritos)

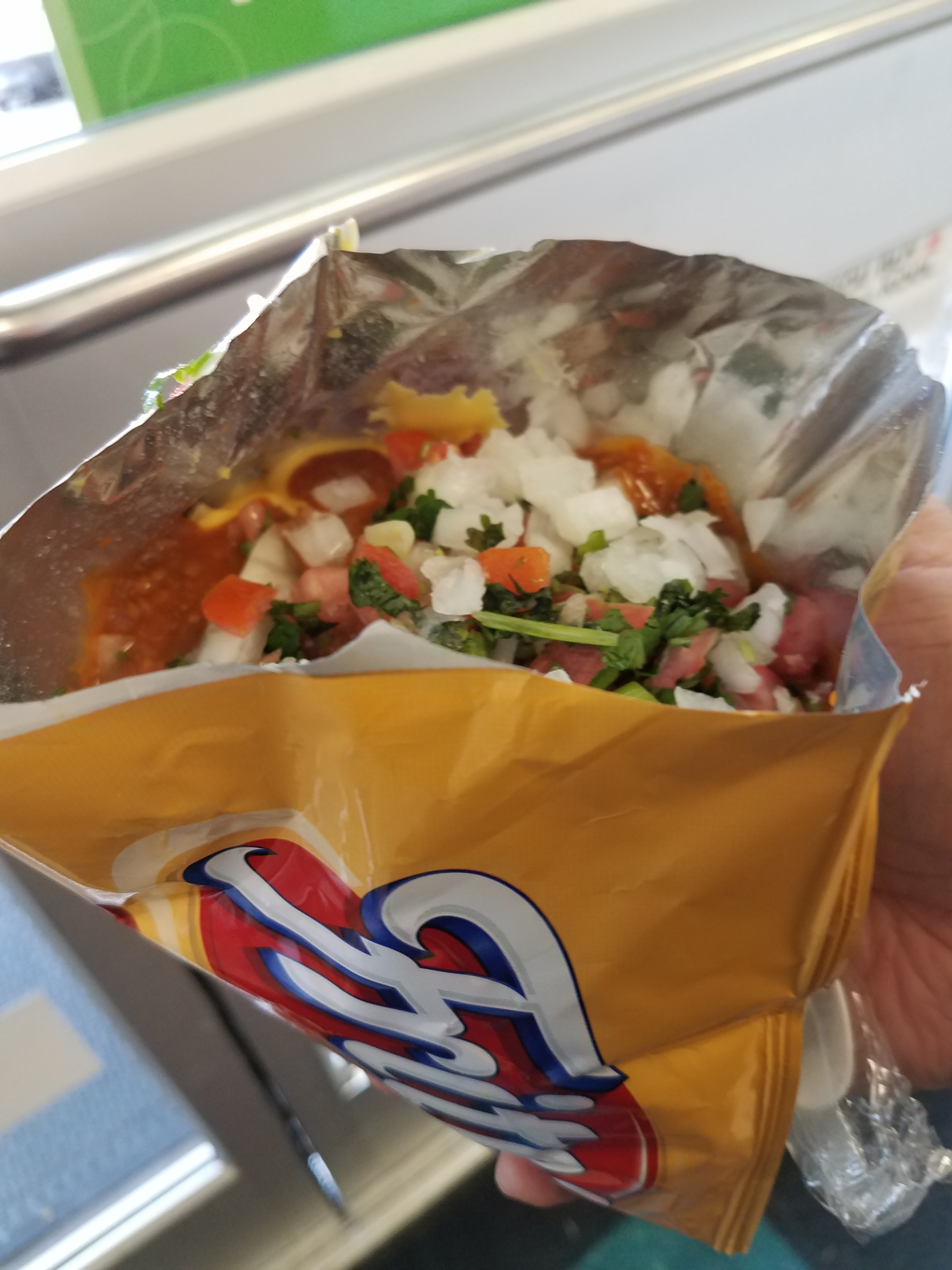
Frito pie variant served in a single serve Fritos bag

Frito pie is a dish popular in the Midwestern, Southeastern, and Southwestern United States, whose basic ingredients are chili, cheese, and corn chips (traditionally Fritos, hence the name). Additions can include salsa, refried beans, sour cream, onion, rice, or jalapeños. There are many variations and alternative names used by region. Frito pie can be prepared in a casserole dish, but an alternative preparation can be in a single-serve Fritos-type corn chip bag with various ingredients as toppings.

== History ==
The exact origin of the Frito pie is not completely clear.

The oldest known recipe using Fritos brand corn chips with chili was published in Texas in 1949. The recipe may have been invented by Daisy Doolin, the mother of Frito Company founder Charles Elmer Doolin and the first person to use Fritos as an ingredient in cooking, or by Mary Livingston, Doolin's executive secretary. The Frito-Lay company attributes the recipe to Nell Morris, who joined Frito-Lay in the 1950s and helped develop an official cookbook which included the Frito pie.

Charles Doolin and his Frito Company were early investors in Disneyland, which opened Casa de Fritos restaurant in Disneyland in 1955. "Frito Chili Pie" appears on the 1950s menu.

Another story says that true Frito pie originated only in the 1960s with Teresa Hernández, who worked at the Woolworth's lunch counter in Santa Fe, New Mexico. Her Frito pie used homemade red chili con carne with cheddar cheese and onions, and was served in the bag, which was thicker in the 1960s than it is now.

== Preparation ==
Frito pie is a simple dish: at its most basic, it is Fritos corn chips with beef chili as a topping. It was historically served right inside the chip bag, which is split down the middle; toppings typically include shredded cheese and chopped raw onion, and may also include additional items like sour cream, tomatoes, and jalapeños.

== Similar Foods ==
=== Frito boats and walking tacos ===
Frito pies are sometimes referred to by the name walking taco or Frito boat, and can be made in a small, single-serving bag of corn chips, with chili, taco meat, chickpeas, pork rinds, pepitas, and many other varied ingredients, poured over the top. The combination can be finished with grated cheese, onions, jalapeños, lettuce, and sour cream, known as a Frito boat. In the Ohio Valley, this preparation is also commonly called taco-in-a-bag. In the Midwest, walking taco is the more widespread term. These are made with nacho cheese Doritos and contain no chili. In many parts of Southern California, they are known as "pepper bellies." Frito pies are popular at sports venues, fundraisers, bingos, open houses, state fairs, and with street vendors.

=== Tostilocos/Dorilocos ===
In Mexico, a version of the dish is known as Tostilocos or Dorilocos ("crazy chips"). It typically consists of a bag of Tostitos (plain) or Doritos (usually nacho-cheese flavored) topped with cueritos, chopped vegetables like shredded carrot, cucumber, jícama, lime juice, Valentina hot sauce, chamoy, Tajín chili powder, salt, and "Japanese peanuts". The term Tostiloco comes from Tijuana, and is found in California. Another term is Doriloco, after Doritos.

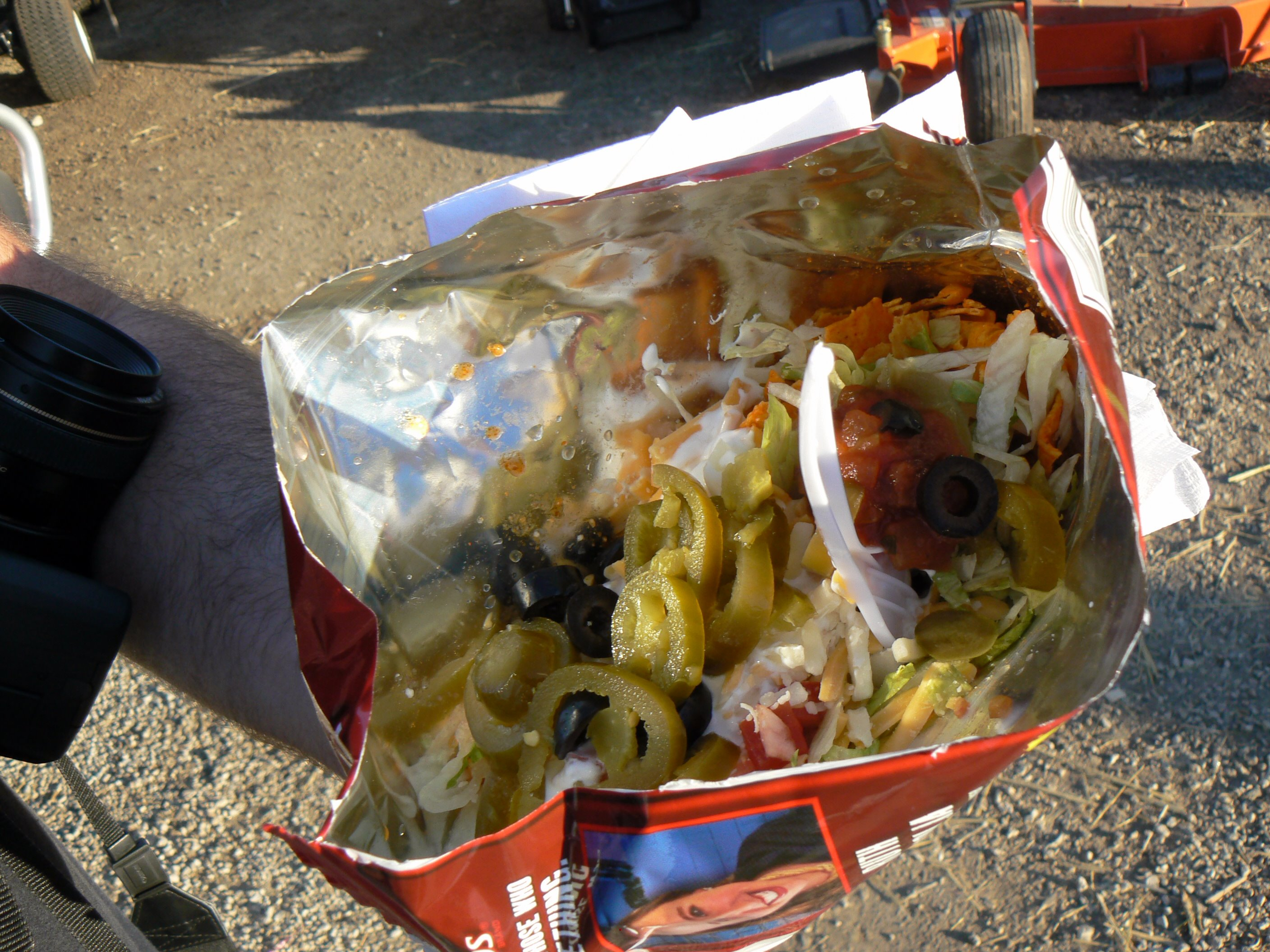
The "walking taco" variation

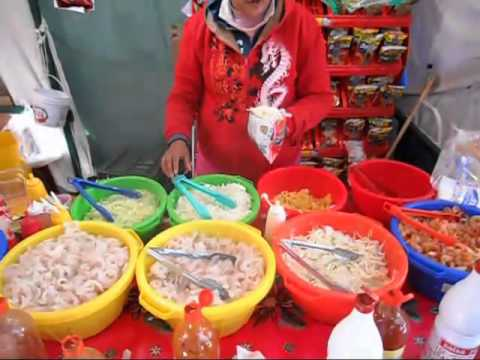
Tostiloco ingredients and preparation

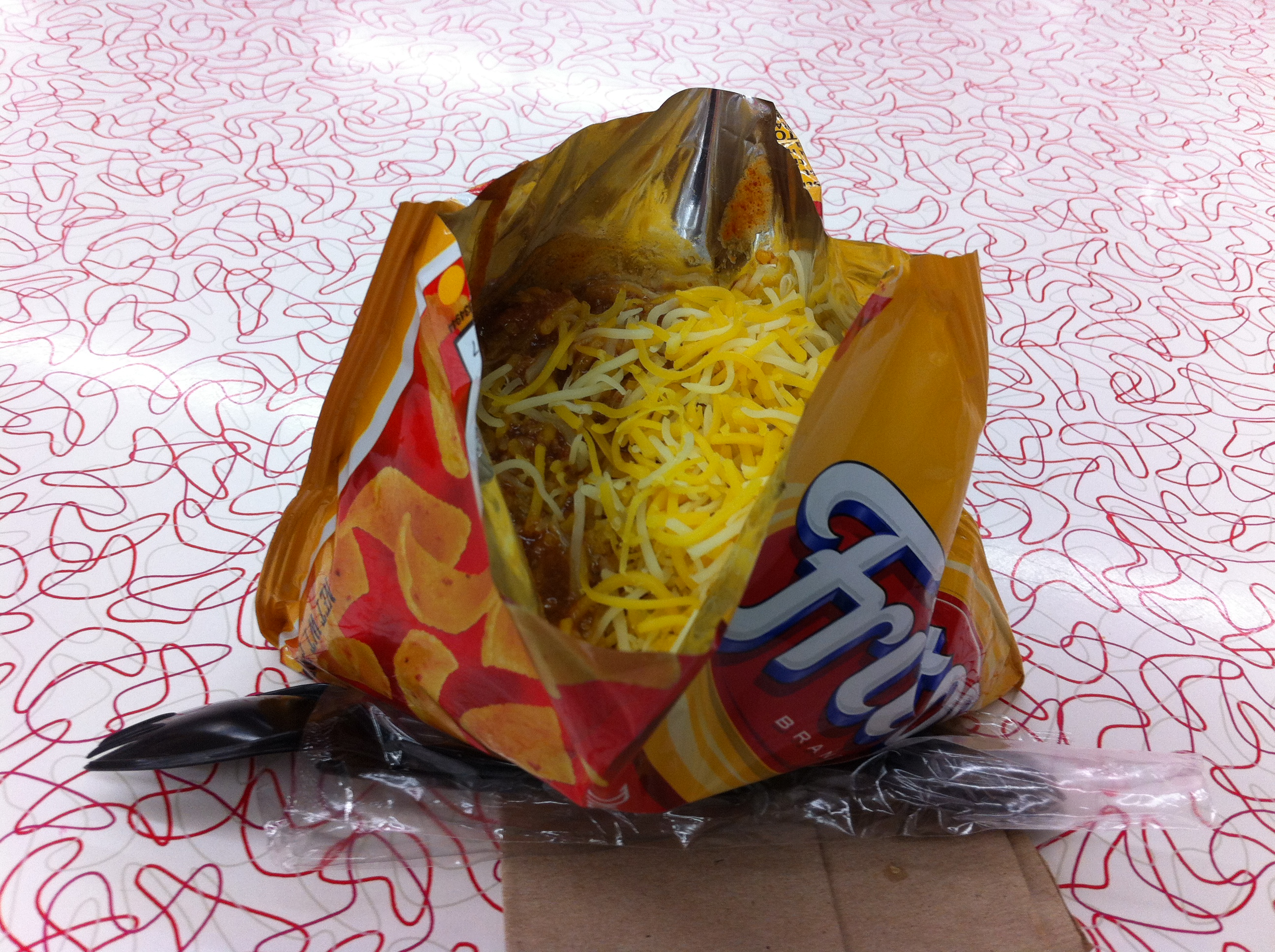
Frito pie from a Five and Dime (formerly Woolworth’s) in Santa Fe, New Mexico

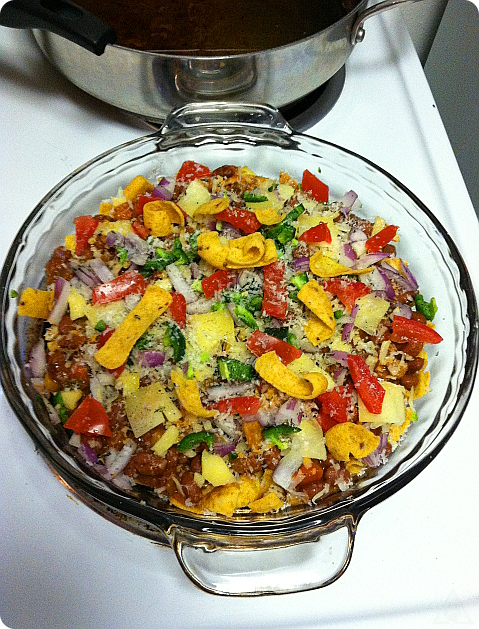
Frito pie with jalapeño, red onion, aged cheddar and Parmigiano Reggiano

== See also ==
- Haystacks
- Taco salad
- Tamale pie
- Tostilocos
- Petro's Chili & Chips, a Knoxville, Tennessee-based fast food chain serving a Frito pie variant first served at the 1982 World's Fair
