= Tostilocos =

Mexican street food

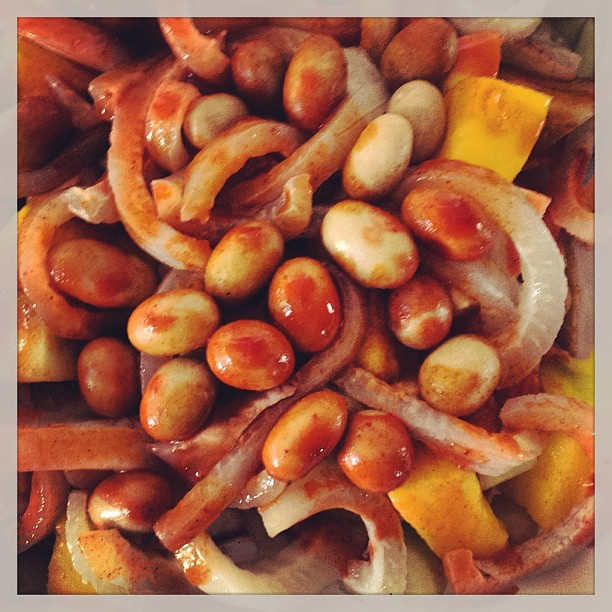
- Close up of Tostilocos with Japanese peanuts
- Course: Snack
- Place of origin: Mexico
- Main ingredients: Tostitos, Chamoy, Lemon
- Variations: Tostitos Preparados (Monterrey)

Tostilocos (also Dorilocos) are a popular Mexican antojito (street food) that consist of Tostitos or Doritos tortilla chips with various toppings. Ingredients can include white corn, cueritos (pickled pork rinds), cucumber, jícama, lime juice, Clamato, mango pieces, hot sauce, chamoy, chili powder, salt, mayonnaise, and Japanese-style peanuts (sometimes referred to as "cracker nuts"). The dish was first conceived in the late 1990s by street vendors in Mexico.

In the 21st century, Tostilocos also known as “Tostitos Preparados” are now commonly sold by street vendors, stadium vendors, and at Mexican juice bars in both Mexico and the Southwestern United States.

== Origin ==
The original Tostilocos were created in Tijuana, Baja California, Mexico. The original mix contained tortilla chips, cueritos, cucumber, jícama, rueditas (little wheel-shaped pieces of fried flour), Japanese peanuts, lime juice, chamoy, and hot sauce.

The word "Tostilocos" is a combination of the name of Tostitos-brand tortilla chips and the Spanish word loco, meaning "crazy". So the name essentially means "crazy chips" or "crazy Tostitos".

== Recipe ==
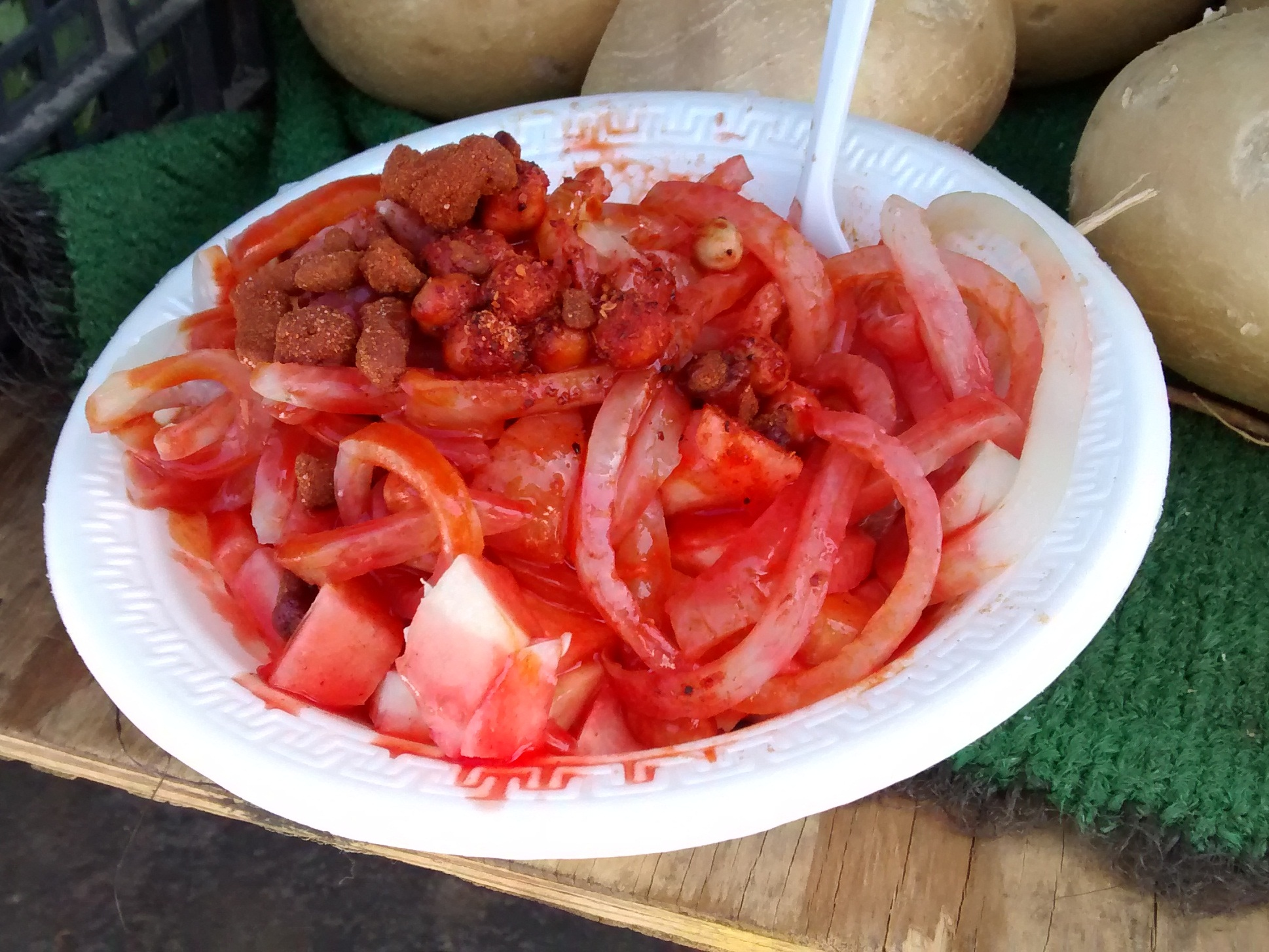
A bowl of Tostilocos with cueritos

The usual way of serving Tostilocos is by cutting open a bag of tortilla chips lengthwise and adding chamoy, lemon or lime juice, and if desired, Valentina hot sauce. After this, cueritos are added. Most often cucumber and jicama are the next toppings, but one can add any fruit desired. The finishing touches are Japanese peanuts and tamarind candies. The candies vary. The resulting concoction is eaten with a fork straight out of the bag, which is the original and most common way. However, vendors have also used Styrofoam plates or bowls.

== Variations ==
Tostilocos is generally a "no rules" type of dish, so the ingredients may vary depending on personal taste. Besides the ingredients mentioned above, some vendors also use nacho cheese, shredded cheese, sliced pickled jalapeños, and chopped mango bits. The base chips can be any flavor of tortilla chips. Tostitos brand tortilla chips are the most commonly used (hence the name), but any brand of tortilla chips works equally well. Some vendors also use different kinds of chips, such as Fritos corn chips, Doritos (called "Dorilocos"), or hot Cheetos.

== See also ==
- Frito pie
