= Chicken feet =

Chicken part

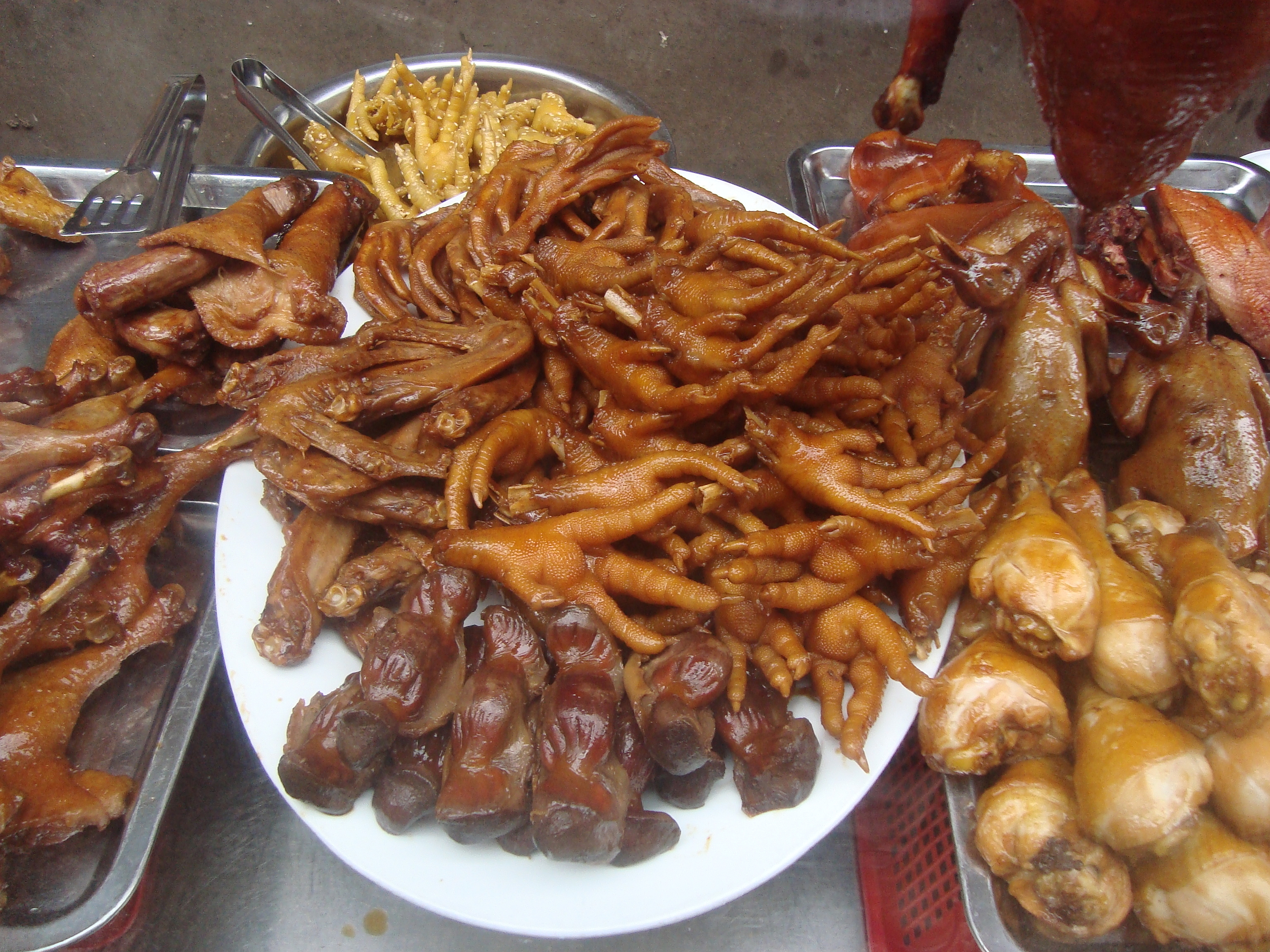
- Chicken feet and other chicken parts for sale on a roadside cart in Haikou, Hainan, China

Chicken feet
- Traditional Chinese: 鳳爪
- Simplified Chinese: 凤爪
- Hanyu Pinyin: fèngzhuǎ
- Literal meaning: Fenghuang claws or phoenix talons (claws)
Transcriptions
Standard Mandarin
- Hanyu Pinyin: fèngzhuǎ
- Bopomofo: ㄈㄥˋ ㄓㄨㄚˇ
- IPA: [fə̂ŋʈʂwà]
Yue: Cantonese
- Yale Romanization: fuhngjáau
- Jyutping: fung6zaau2
- Sidney Lau: fung6jaau2
- IPA: [fòŋtsǎːu]

Chicken feet are cooked and eaten in many countries. After an outer layer of hard skin is removed, most of the edible tissue on the feet consists of skin and tendons, with no muscle. This gives the feet a distinct gelatinous texture different from the rest of the chicken meat.

== Around the world ==
=== China ===
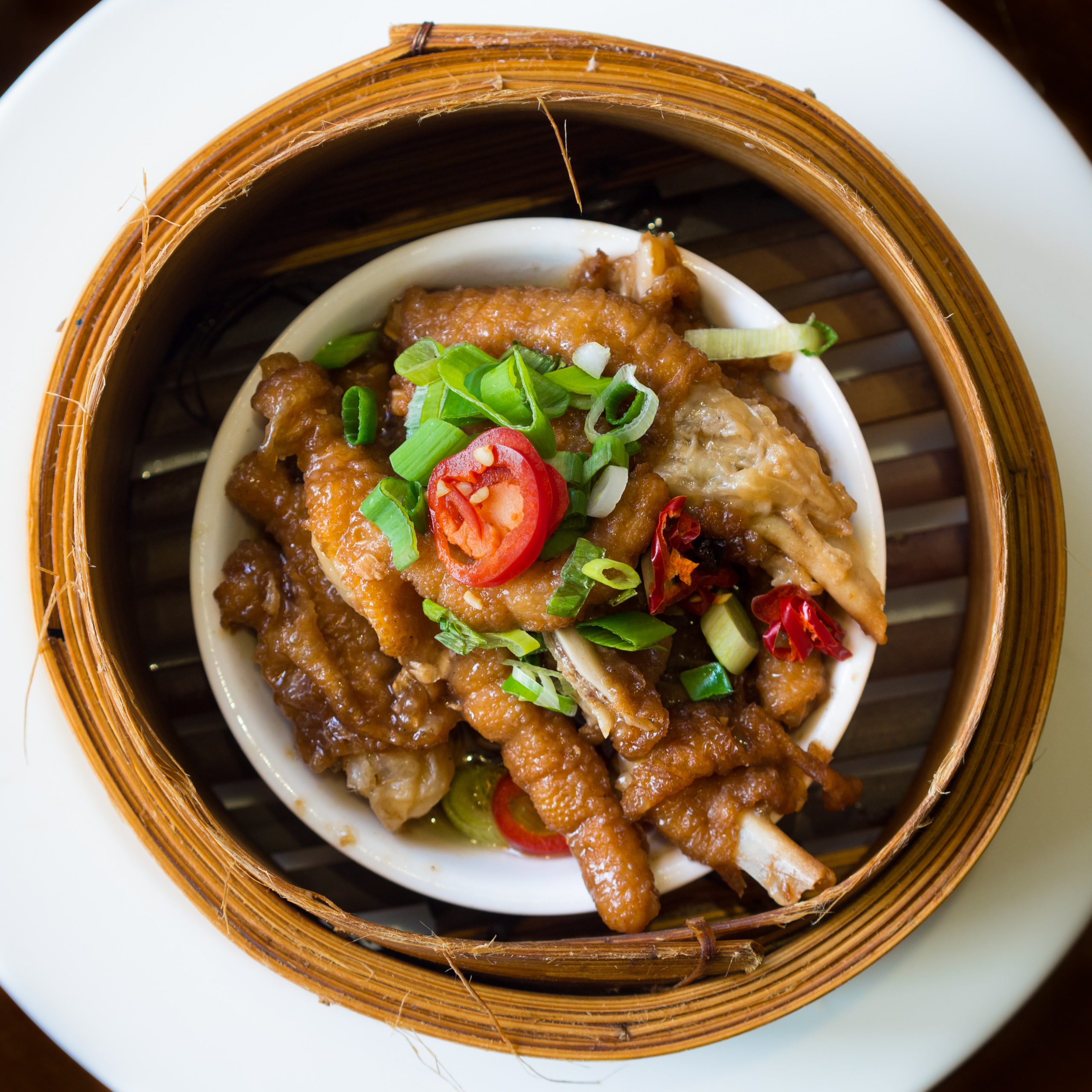
Chicken feet from a dim sum restaurant in the Netherlands

Chicken feet are used in several regional Chinese cuisines; they can be served as a beer snack, cold dish, soup or main dish. They are interchangeably called fèng zhǎo (鳯爪, phoenix claws), jī zhǎo (鷄爪, chicken claws), and jī jiǎo (雞脚, chicken feet).

In Guangdong and Hong Kong, they are typically deep-fried and steamed first to make them puffy before being stewed and simmered in a sauce flavoured with black fermented beans, bean paste, and sugar; or in abalone sauce.

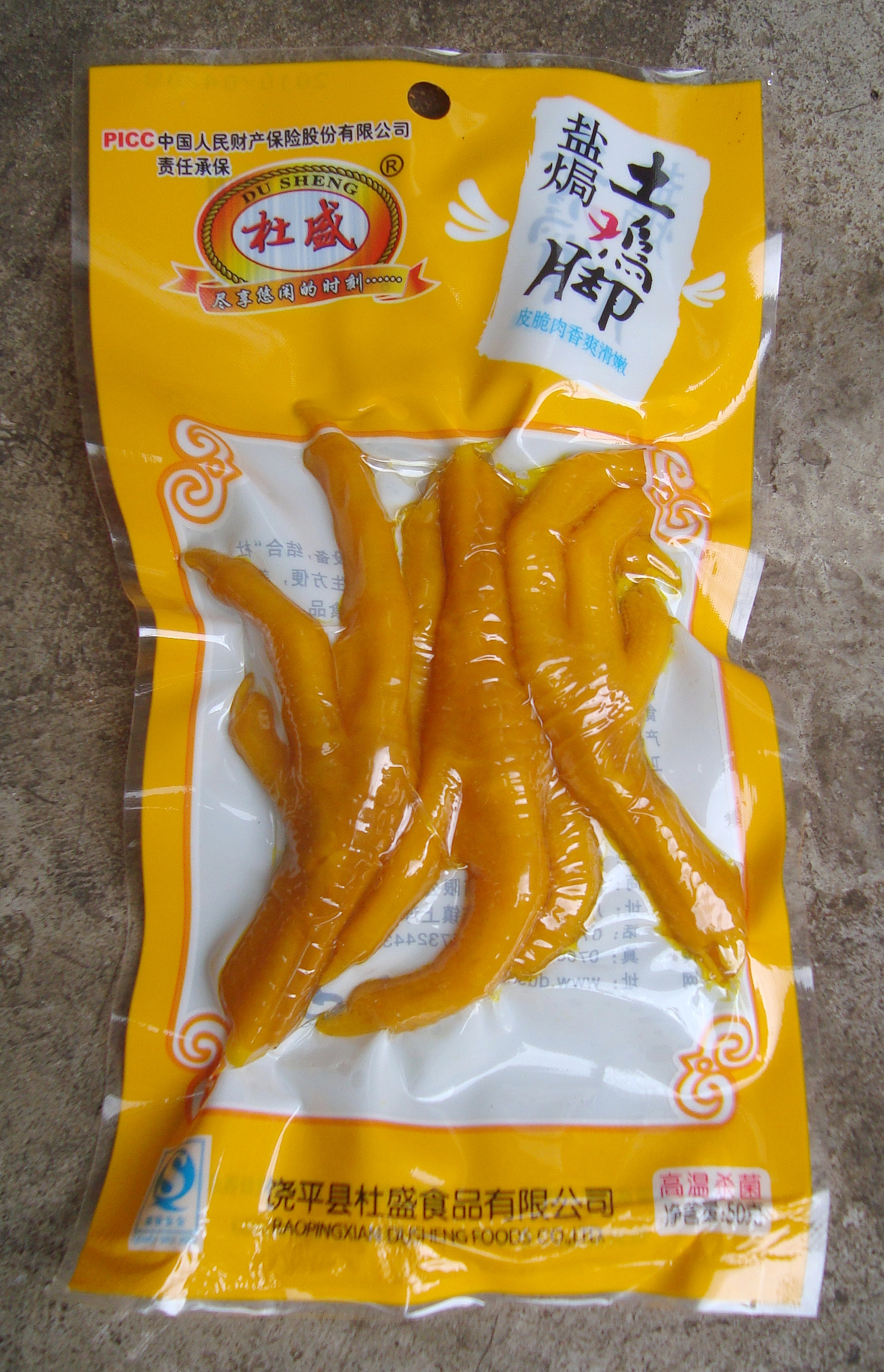
Salt-baked chicken feet sold in China, vacuum-packed and ready to eat

In mainland China, popular snack bars specializing in marinated food such as yabozi (duck's necks) also sell lu ji zhua (鹵雞爪, marinated chicken feet), which are simmered with soy sauce, Sichuanese peppercorn, clove, garlic, star anise, cinnamon, and chili flakes. Today, packaged chicken feet are sold in most grocery stores and supermarkets in China as a snack, often seasoned with rice vinegar and chili. Another common recipe is bai yun feng zhao (白雲鳯爪), marinated in a sauce of rice vinegar, rice wine flavored with sugar, salt, and minced ginger for an extended period and served as a cold dish. In southern China, they also cook chicken feet with raw peanuts to make a thin soup.

The huge demand in China raises the price of chicken feet, which are often used as fodder in other countries. As of June 2011, 1 kg of raw chicken feet costs around 12 to 16 yuan in China, compared to 11–12 yuan for 1 kg of frozen chicken breast. In 2000, Hong Kong, once the largest entrepôt for shipping chicken feet from over 30 countries, traded a total of 420,000 tons of chicken feet at the value of US$230 million. Two years after joining the WTO in 2001, China approved the direct import of American chicken feet, and since then China has been the major destination of chicken feet from around the globe.

Aside from chicken feet, duck feet are also eaten. Duck feet with mustard, often served with vinegar, fresh green pepper, and crushed garlic, is a popular salad or appetizer.

=== Eastern Europe ===
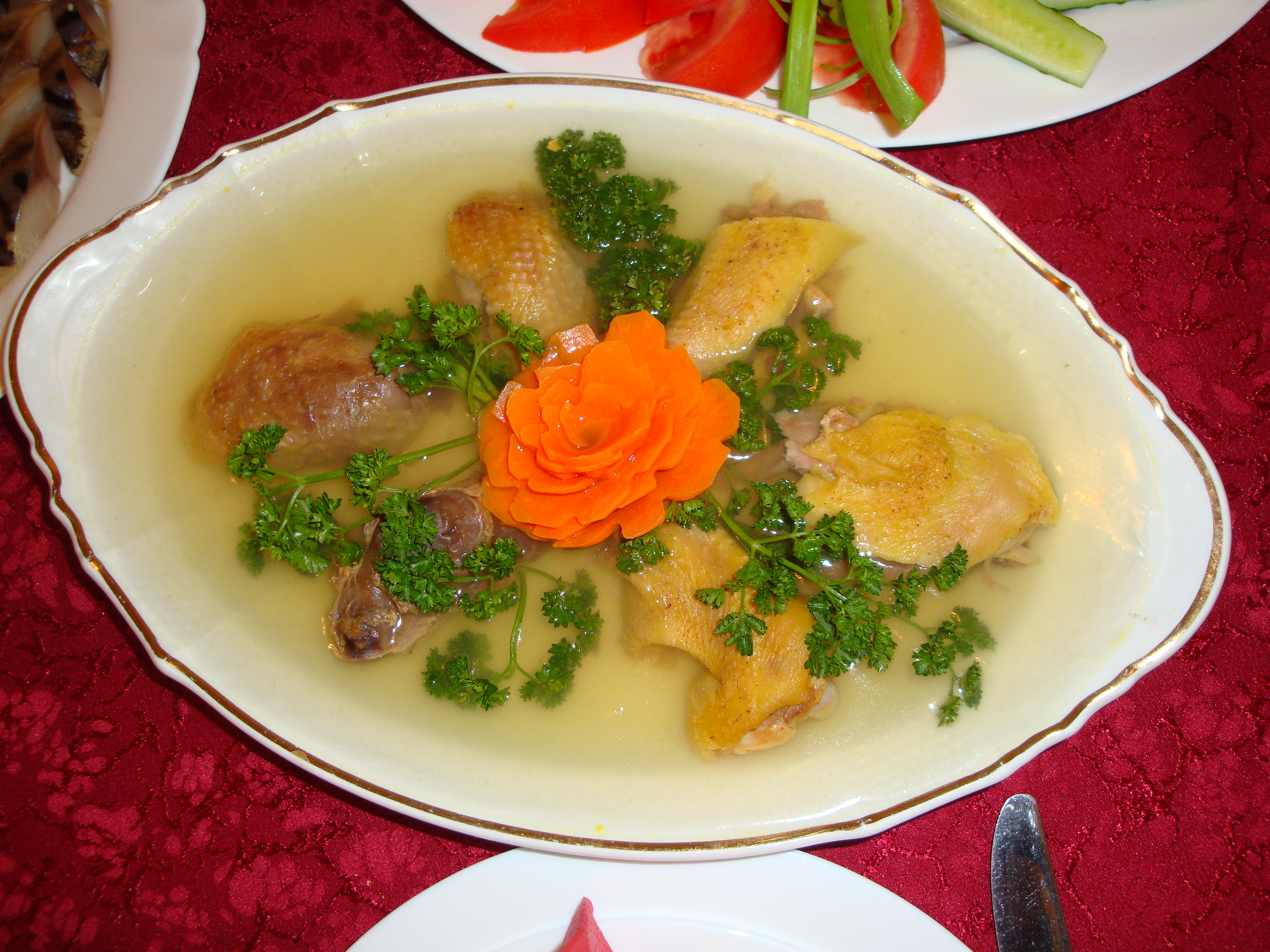
Moldovan chicken racitura. In this serving, the chicken legs were removed after boiling.

In Russia, Ukraine, Romania, and Moldova, chicken feet are cleaned, seasoned, and boiled, often with vegetables, and then cooled, to make an aspic called kholodets in Russian and Ukrainian, and piftie or răcitură in Romanian. The legs are not always eaten; however, the chicken is cooked with its legs, as they contain a high amount of gelatin.

=== Indonesia ===
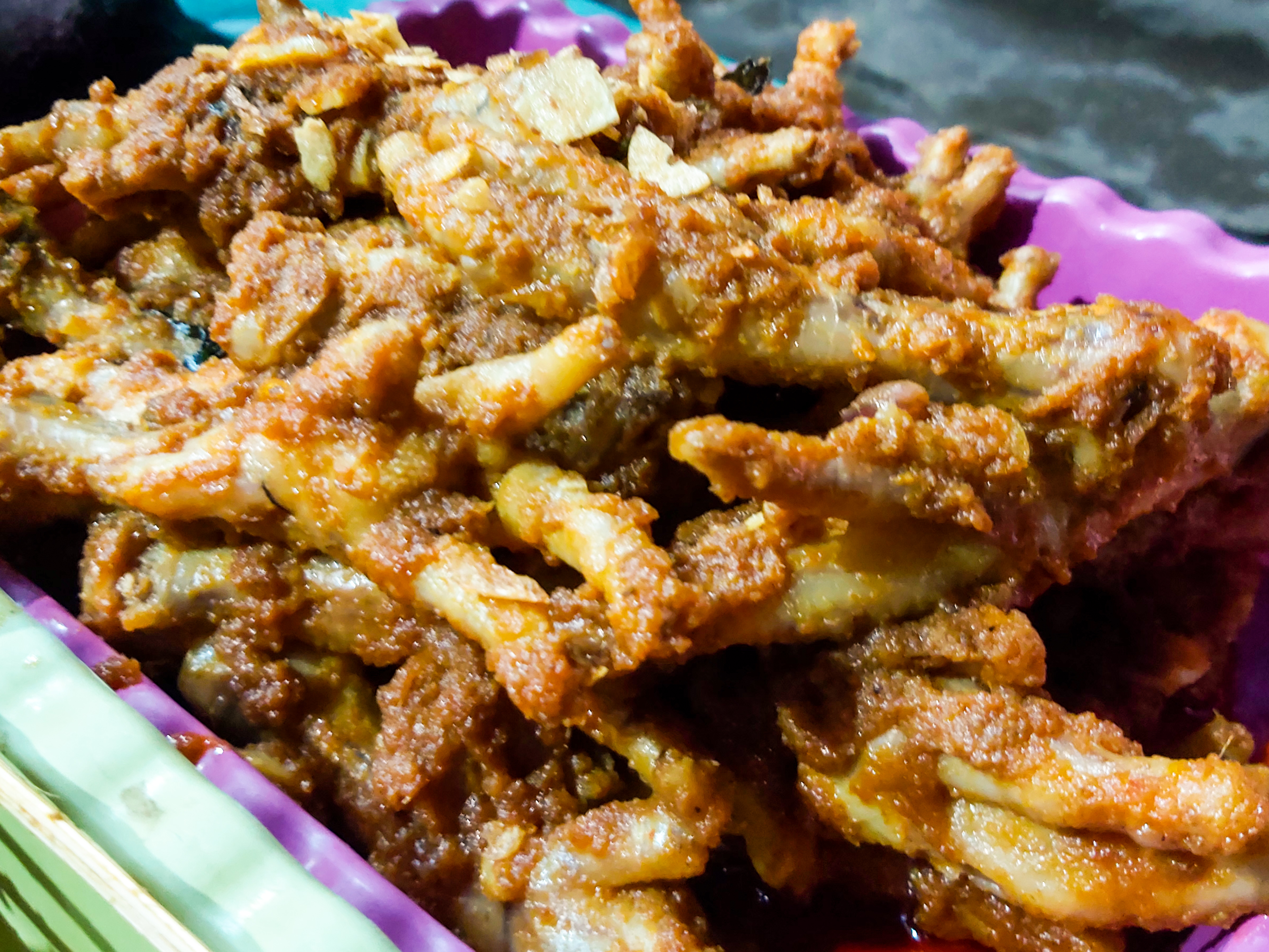
Indonesian spicy chicken feet

In Indonesian cuisine, chicken feet are known as ceker and commonly served in Indonesia, especially in Java. The most common way to serve chicken feet in Indonesia is in a spicy traditional soup called soto; nevertheless, Chinese-style dim sum chicken feet are also available in some Chinese restaurants in Indonesia. Soto ceker consists of chicken feet served in clear yellowish spicy soto broth, which uses spices including ground shallot, garlic, galangal, ginger, candlenut, bruised lemongrass, daun salam (Indonesian bay leaf) and turmeric to add the yellowish color, served with cabbage, celery, rice noodles, and garnished to taste with sambal, lime and soy.

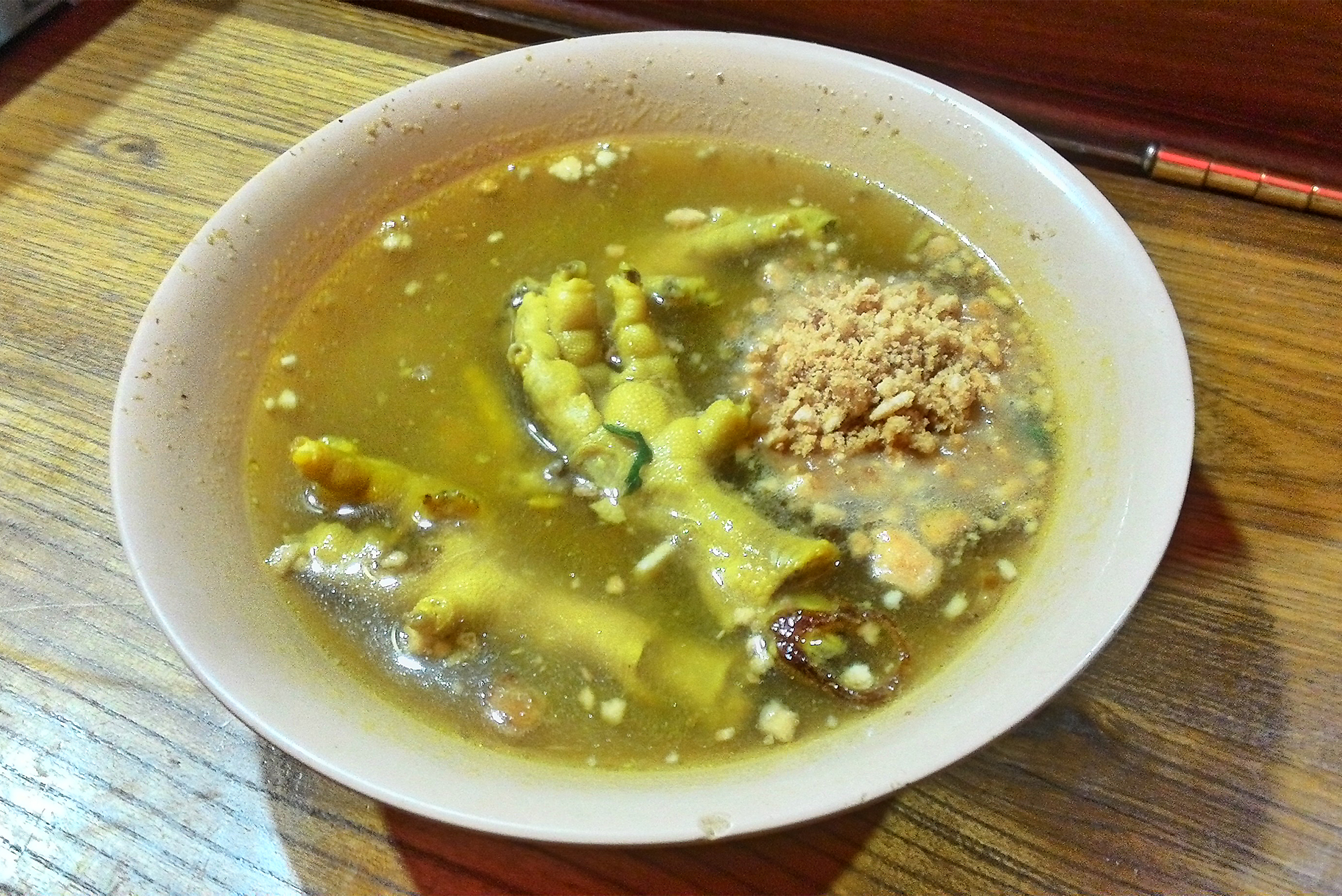
Soto ceker, Indonesian chicken feet soup.

Soto ceker is a common street food in Jakarta, Bali, Surabaya, Bandung, and most of the major cities in Indonesia. In streetside warung or humble restaurants, soto ceker is usually offered as a variation of soto ayam (chicken soto), which employs the same soup base. A popular soto ceker stall can use up to 40 kilograms of chicken feet every day, although the stall is only open from 4 p.m. to 11 p.m., and can make Rp 5 million (US$360) in sales each day.

Chicken feet may also be served in a simple soup (sop or sup), sop ceker, which mainly contains chicken broth, chicken feet, potato, carrot, shallot, garlic, other vegetables, and black pepper. The deep-fried peeled chicken feet, which have been separated from their bones, may be served as crispy snacks such as kripik ceker (chicken feet crackers).

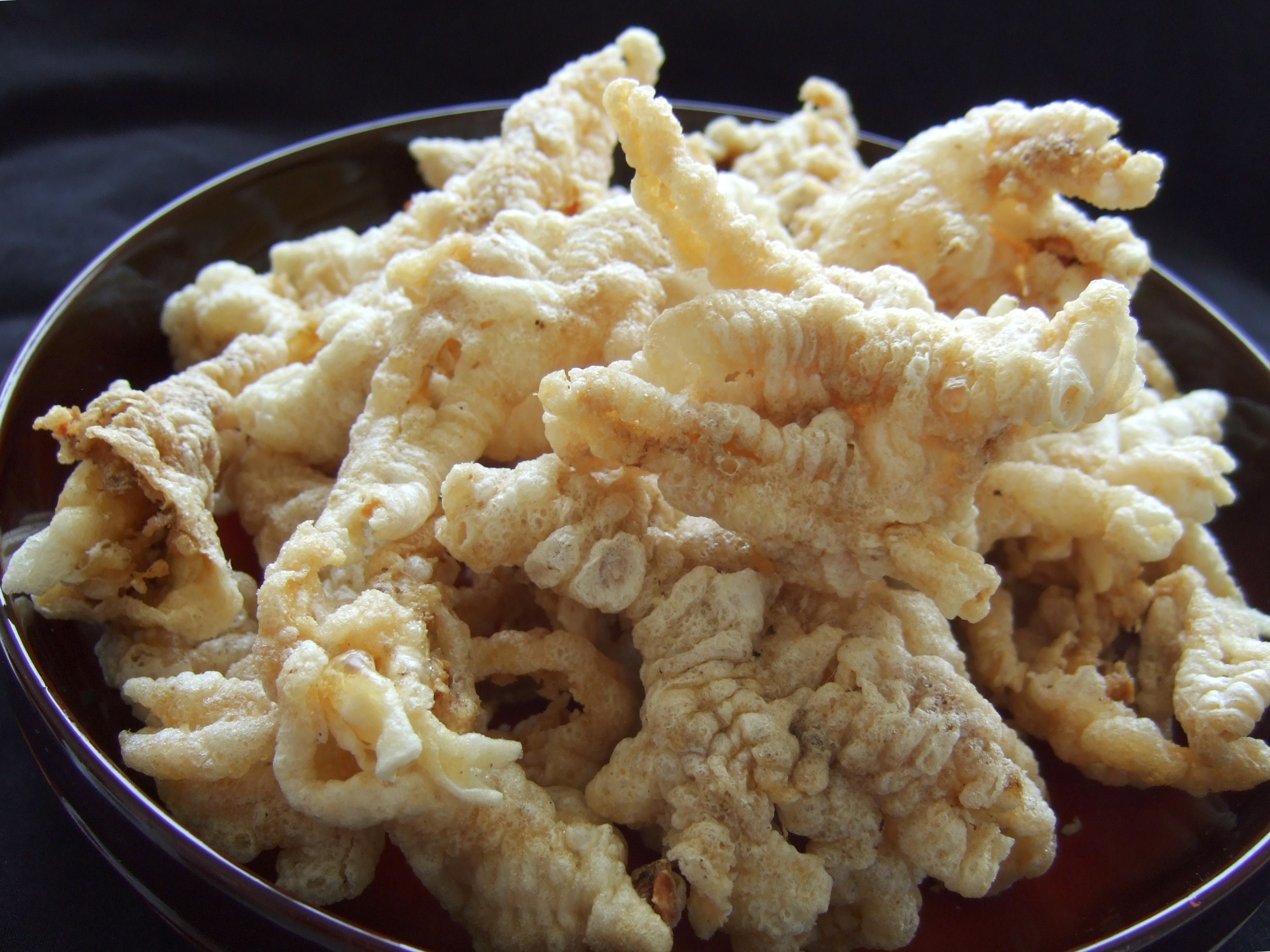
Chicken feet kripik

In Indonesia, soft peeled boneless chicken feet are frequently used as baby food for infants between 6 and 12 months old. They are often served as nasi tim: steamed rice with boneless chicken feet, mashed liver, and vegetable broth. Chicken feet consist of tendons, skin, and cartilage, are rich in gelatinous collagen, and are traditionally believed to be beneficial for infants' skin, nails, joints, and bone development.

=== Jamaica ===
In Jamaican cuisine, chicken feet are mainly used to make chicken foot soup. The soup contains yams, potatoes, green bananas, dumplings, and special spices in addition to the chicken feet, and is slow-cooked for a minimum of two hours. Chicken feet are also curried or stewed and served as a main part of a meal.

=== Kenya ===
In Kenyan cuisine, chicken feet are known as virenjee. The feet are submerged in hot water so the outer skin can be removed by peeling it off. The legs are then covered with seasonings and grilled.

=== Korea ===
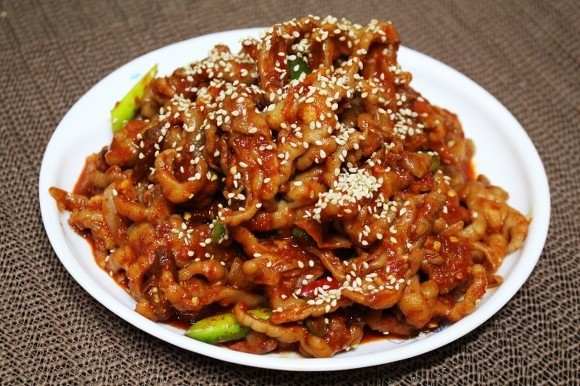
Dakbal-bokkeum (stir-fried chicken feet)

In Korea, chicken feet are known as dakbal (닭발), and grilled or stir-fried with hot chili sauce. There are many types of cooking methods, including bone-free, cooked with soup, and so on. They are often eaten as anju (food served with alcohol).

=== Kosher ===
Chicken feet are commonly used as a main or supplementary ingredient in kosher chicken soup.

=== Malaysia ===
Chicken feet are also known as ceker in Malaysia and are traditionally popular mostly among Malays of Javanese, Chinese, and Siamese descent. Many traditional Malay restaurants in the state of Johor offer chicken feet that are cooked together with Malay-style curry and eaten with roti canai. In the state of Selangor, chicken feet are either deep-fried in palm oil or boiled in soup with vegetables and spices until the bones are soft. Chicken feet are also eaten by Malaysian Chinese in traditional Chinese cooking style.

=== Mexico ===
Chicken feet (also known as patitas) are a common ingredient across Mexico, particularly in stews and soups. They are often steamed to become part of a main dish with rice, vegetables, and most likely another part of the chicken, such as the breast or thighs. The feet can be seasoned with mole sauce. On occasion, they are breaded and fried.

Many people will also take the chicken feet in hand as a snack and chew the soft outer skin, while the inner bone structure is left uneaten. Another such popular snack is chicken necks (also known as pescuezos) that are usually sold by street vendors and accompanied with salsa Valentina.

=== Philippines ===
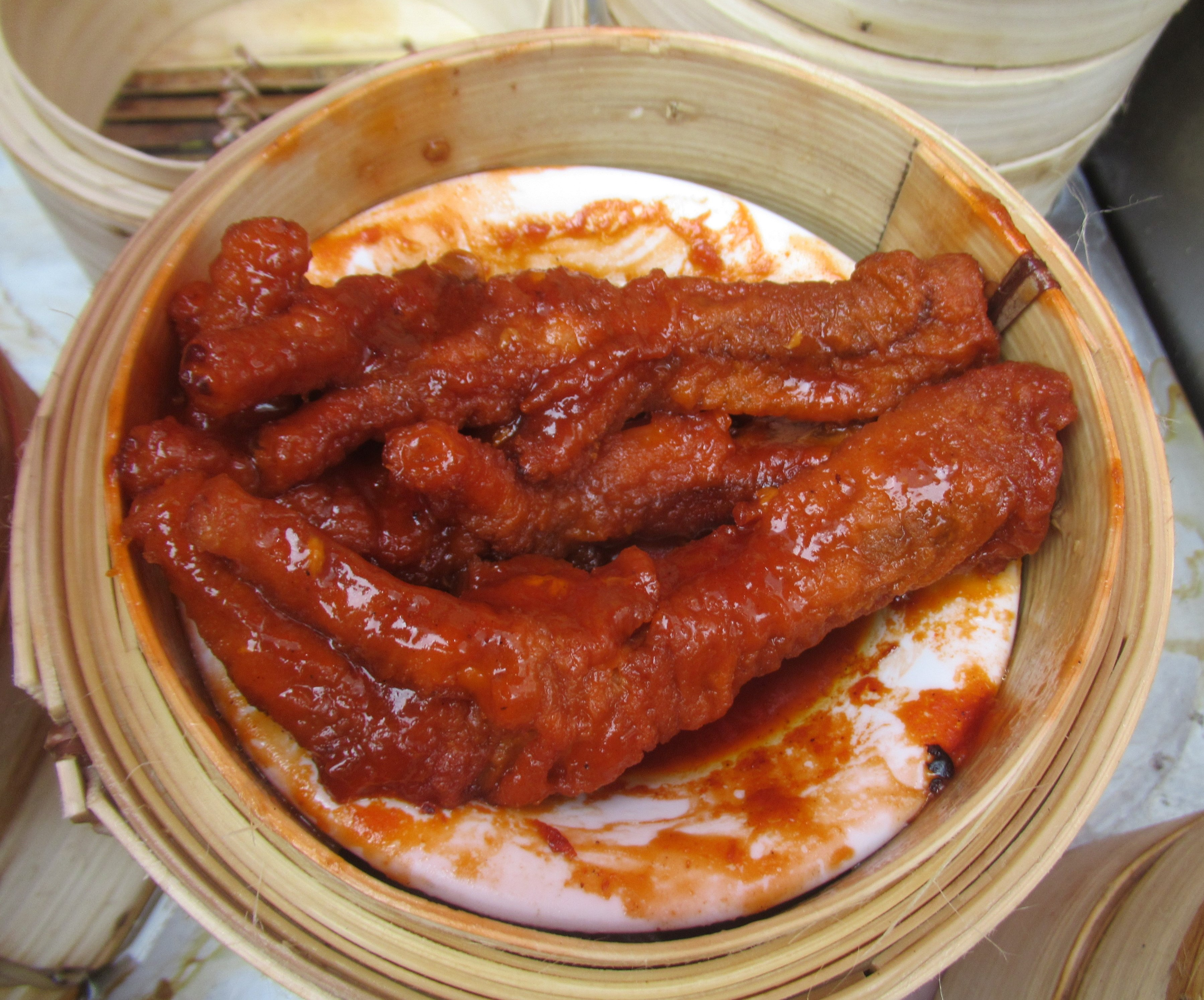
Street food in Banaue Avenue, Quezon City, on Chinese New Year 2024

In the Philippines, chicken feet is known as a staple in street food; and are usually marinated in a mixture of calamansi, spices, and brown sugar before being grilled. Chicken feet are also an ingredient in Philippine adobo.

=== Portugal ===
In Portugal, chicken feet are frequently served in the Azores, where they are normally cooked into fried rice with spices and olive oil or accompanied with a side dish of rice. They can be stewed with beans or made as a one-pot dish. Coriander is added in mainland Portugal for additional flavor.

=== South Africa ===
In South Africa, chicken feet are mainly eaten in townships in all nine provinces, where they are known as "maotwana Sesotho or amanqina" (together with the head, intestine, hearts and giblets), "runaways"," and "Amanqina" (in isiXhosa) The feet are submerged in hot water, so the outer layer of the skin can be removed by peeling it off, and then covered in seasonings and grilled. The name "chicken dust" derives from the dust chickens create when scratching the ground with their feet. They are often eaten as a snack.

=== Thailand ===
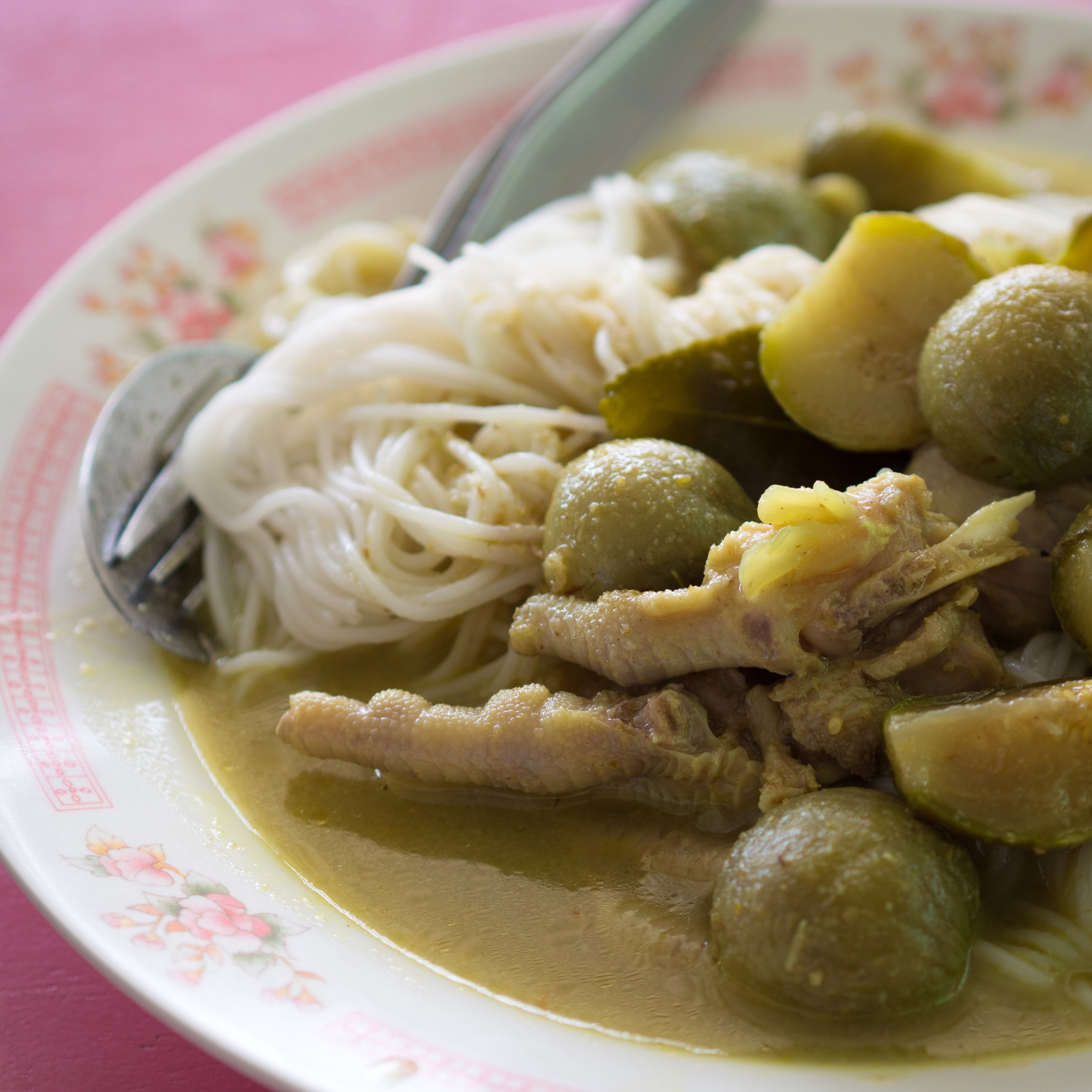
Khanom chin kaeng khiao wan kai is Thai green chicken curry served over rice noodles. This version is made with chicken feet.

In Thai cuisine, chicken feet are served in a variety of dishes, including a version of chicken green curry.

=== Trinidad ===
In Trinidad, chicken feet are cleaned, seasoned, boiled in seasoned water, and left to soak with cucumbers, onions, peppers and green seasoning until cool. This party dish is called chicken foot souse.

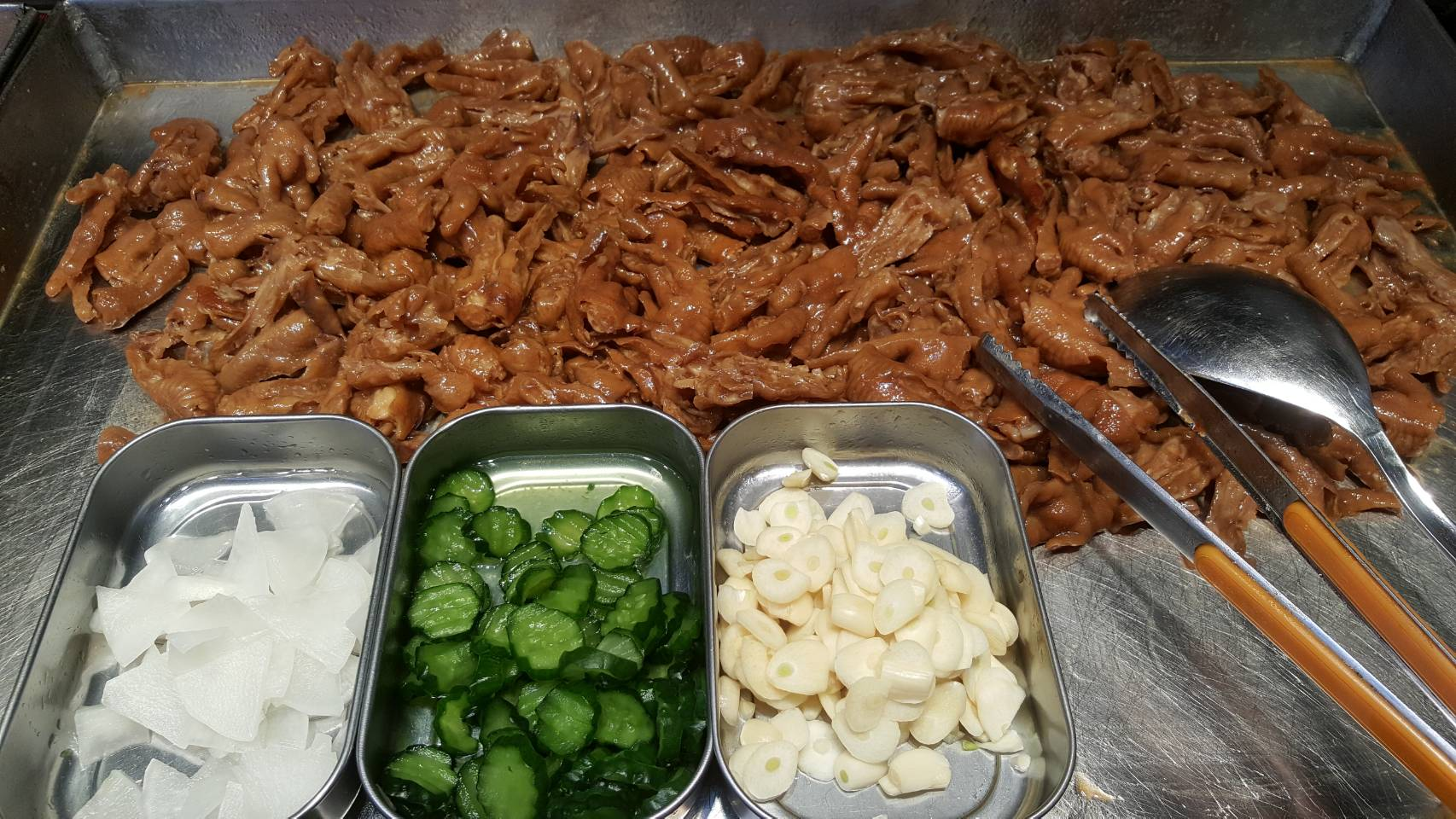
Boneless chicken feet at a Taiwanese market stall

=== Egypt ===
In Egypt chicken feet were only introduced around 2022, when Egypt's National Nutrition Institute posted several "budget-friendly, protein-rich food alternatives," including chicken feet. Egyptian newspapers and news websites also published reports discussing the "benefits of chicken feet," citing the National Nutrition Institute's website. Some said this media campaign was aimed to convince people to eat cheap foods instead of meat and poultry, whose prices, like those of other commodities, are rising significantly.

== See also ==
- List of chicken dishes
