= Mexican juice bar =

Mexican food and drink establishment

A Frutería or Mexican juice bar (Literal translation: Fruit-shop) is a juice bar that primarily serves Mexican desserts, beverages, antojitos and other popular Mexican snack foods. Mexican juice bars are popular establishments in many parts of Mexico and more recently in Mexican American communities in the South-Western United States.

== Structure ==
Mexican juice bars serve a lot of the same foods as the popular fruit and juice stands and roadside carts in Mexico. The advantage of a juice bar is that it can provide more menu items, refrigerate its ingredients, keeping them fresh for longer periods of time, and juice bars are also generally cleaner and more comfortable as they offer guests a place to sit down and enjoy their food.

Mexican juice bars can be stand alone businesses or part of a larger establishment like a carnicería (Mexican meat market). Mexican juice bars are also sometimes combined with panaderías (Mexican bakeries) or taquerías (Mexican taco shops).

Most Mexican juice bars attempt to promote healthy eating and as such, many of the items are healthy choices that involve fruits, vegetables and grains in some way or another.

== Common menu items ==
Mexican juice bars can offer a variety of menu items. The following is a list of common desserts and beverages found at Mexican juice bars:

- Aguas frescas
- Bionico
- Blended coffee
- Chicharrónes (fried pork rinds with lime and hot sauce)
- Diablitos (mango sorbet with chamoy)
- Escamocha (Mexican fruit cocktail)
- Parfait
- Frutas picadas (chopped assorted fruits with lime and chili powder)
- Helados
- Jugos naturales (fresh fruit and vegetable juices like green juice)
- Licuados
- Malteadas
- Mangoneada (raspado with chopped mango, chamoy, chili powder, tamarind and mango syrup and a tamarind candy straw)
- Paletas
- Raspados
- Tejuino
- Tepache
- Tostilocos

== Gallery ==
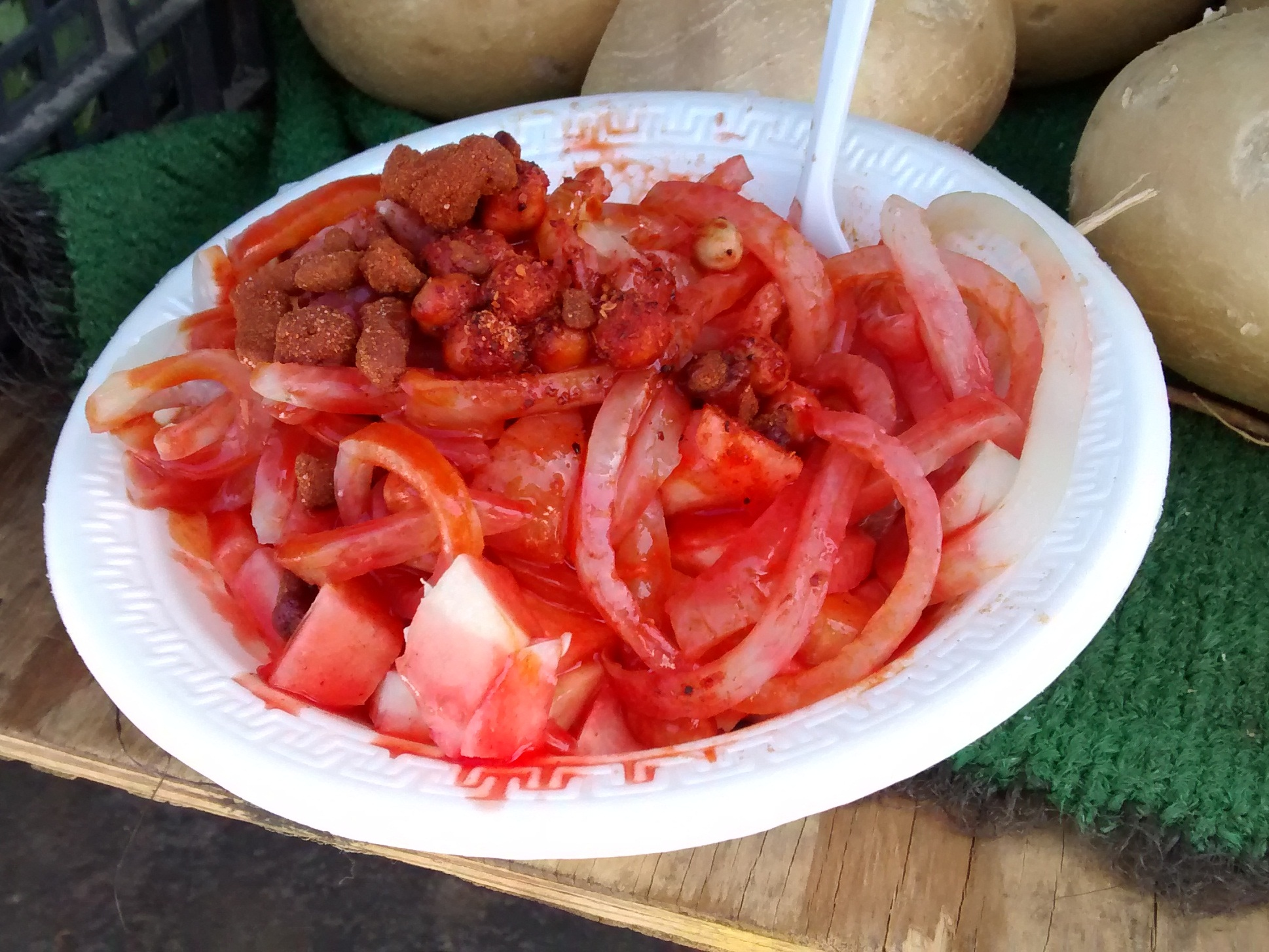
Tostilocos

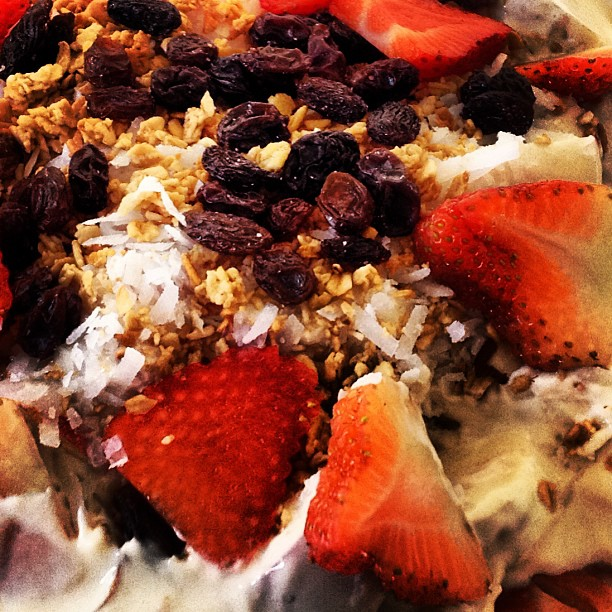
Bionico

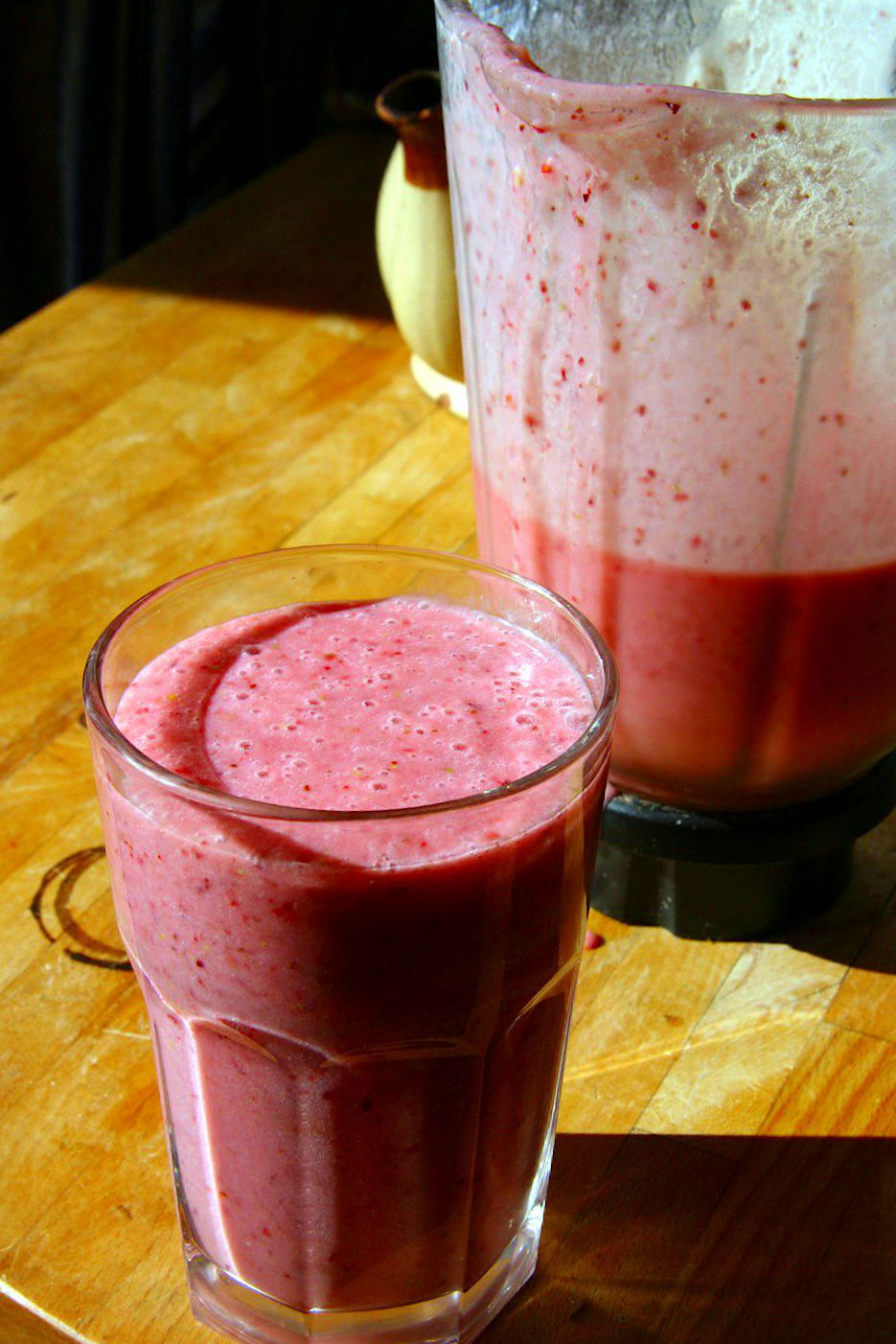
Licuado

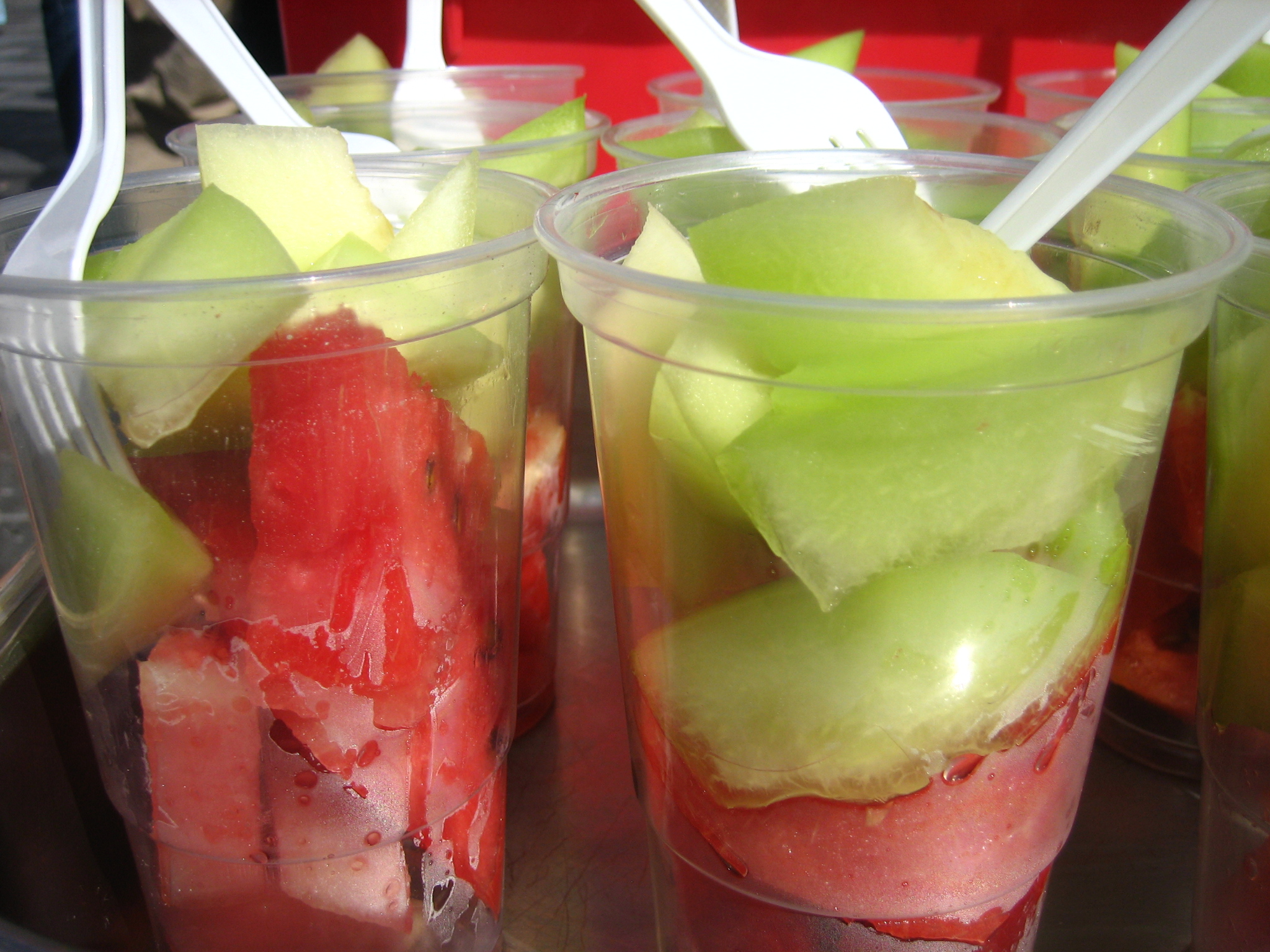
Fruta picada

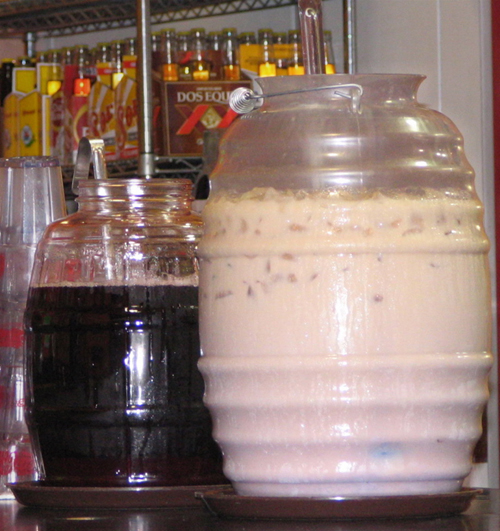
Aguas frescas

== See also ==
- Juice bars
- Mexican street food
