= Cueritos =

Latin cuisine pickled pork skin

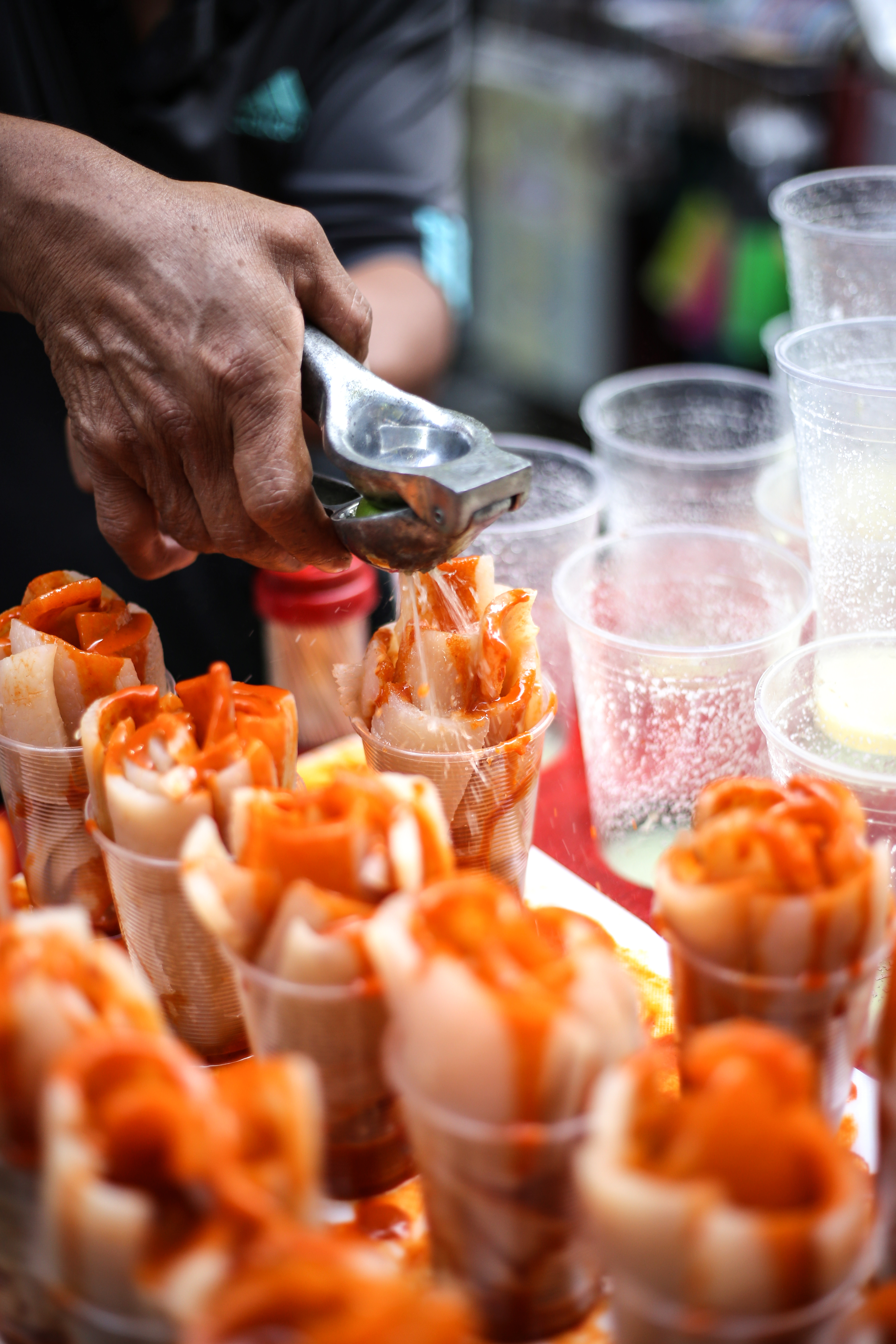
Cueritos with Valentina hot sauce and lime

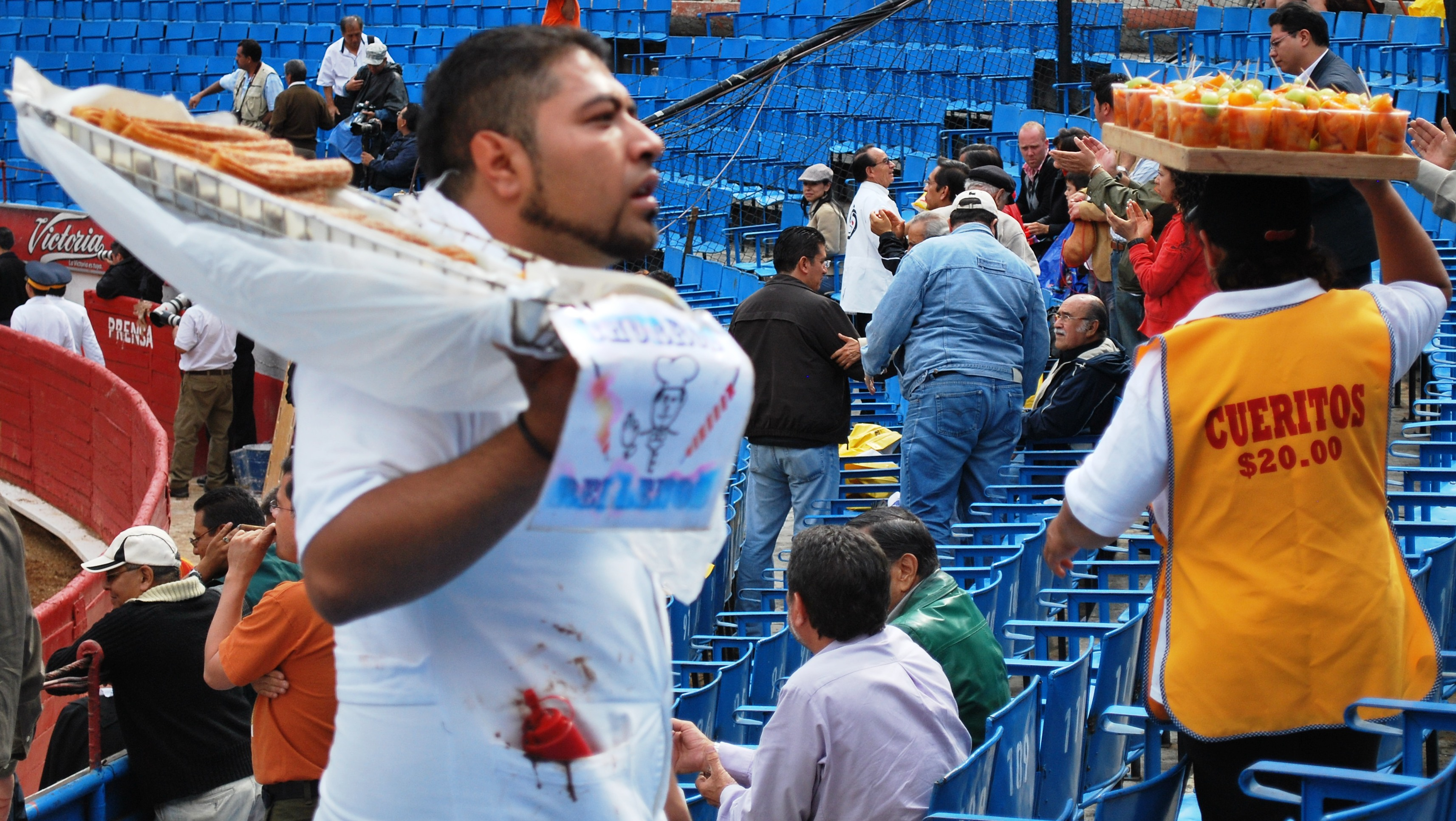
Vendors selling churros and cueritos (in a spicy sauce) at the Plaza de Toros in Mexico City

Cueritos (diminutive of cuero, Spanish for 'skin/hide'; also cueritos en vinagre) are Latin cuisine pickled pork rinds. A type of encurtido (pickled appetizer), the vinegar is typically heavily seasoned, with ingredients including pineapple, piloncillo, cloves, peppercorns, chile de árbol and oregano.

Cueritos are used to make a type of cemita and can be used in other dishes like tostadas. Cueritos are sometimes served in a glass with strips of the pickled pork rind alongside a slaw of cabbage, cucumber, lime, and chile sauce. The Mexican street food (antojito) known as "tostilocos" are made by slicing nacho-flavored tostito chips vertically and topping them with cucumber, cueritos, lime juice, Valentina hot sauce, chamoy, tajín (seasoning) chili powder, salt and "Japanese peanuts" (peanuts encased in a crunchy brown flour shell).

In Acatlán, Hidalgo the feast in honor of the Archangel Michael is held from 20–29 September, with religious events, traditional dances and traditional foods such as cueritos made with chili pepper sauce and varieties of pulque.

Pickling differentiates cueritos from chicharrón, which is fried pork skin. In Spain the chicharrón is the rind with fat still attached and cuerito is a rind with no fat attached. In Mexico, chicharrón is the cuerito or pig skin fried to a crisp like cracklings in the southern states and cueritos is soft, deep fat fried pig skin, chopped and used for tacos.

In Mexico, natural, uncured cueritos, usually the thick pig skin without the fat attached, are always combined with "macisa", solid or thick meat, in carnitas which is deep fat fried pig parts sold for tacos. The tacos are served with a choice of meats, chopped, in 1 or 2 soft corn tortillas, covered with chopped cilantro and onion, and the choice of a hot chilli sauce. They are a popular street food that can be found in public markets, most carnicerías, or meat stores, and many restaurants.

== Cuts of cueritos ==
Cuerito grueso is thick pigskin from the pig ears, face and feet. Cuerito delgado is from the pig's body and is thinner. Either type can be pickled (cueritos en vinagre) which are a type of

== See also ==
- Chicharon
