= Tamarindo (drink) =

Mexican non-alcoholic beverage

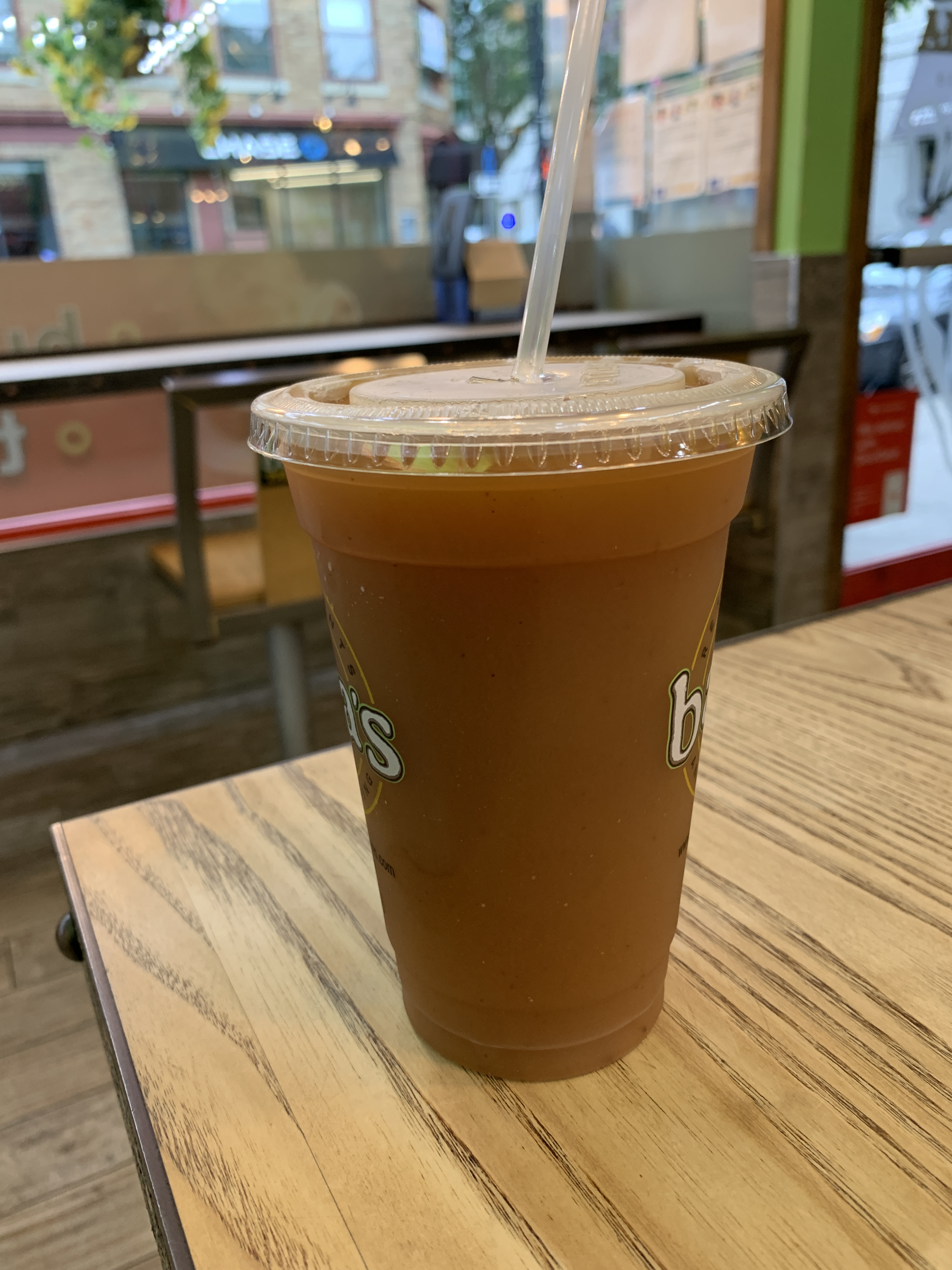
- Type: Agua fresca
- Origin: Mexico, Central America, Cuba, Puerto Rico, the Dominican Republic
- Colour: Reddish brown
- Flavor: Sour-sweet
- Ingredients: Tamarind, water and sugar

Tamarindo, also commonly known as agua de tamarindo, is a non-alcoholic beverage made of tamarind, sugar, and water. The tamarind plant originated in Africa but has since been widely distributed on a global scale and is commonly found in tropical regions. The tamarind plant produces fruit pods containing pulp and seeds. Tamarind is a versatile ingredient that is used for a variety of commercial, culinary and medicinal purposes with the pulp being the most commonly used part of the tamarind plant, used in a range of beverages including tamarindo and other similar beverages such as Nam Ma Kham Wan in Thailand and Poha Beer in Ghana. Tamarind pulp offers a flavor that ranges from sour to sweet, making tamarindo a sour-sweet beverage (dependent on the amount of sugar added, as well as on the tamarind cultivar used) recognized as a popular flavor of aguas frescas, which is traditionally consumed in Latin America. Comprising only three ingredients, tamarindo involves a simple production process making it an easy beverage to prepare at home. Tamarindo has been produced commercially as a soda flavor, by companies such as Jarritos and Nestle, and distributed globally.

== History ==
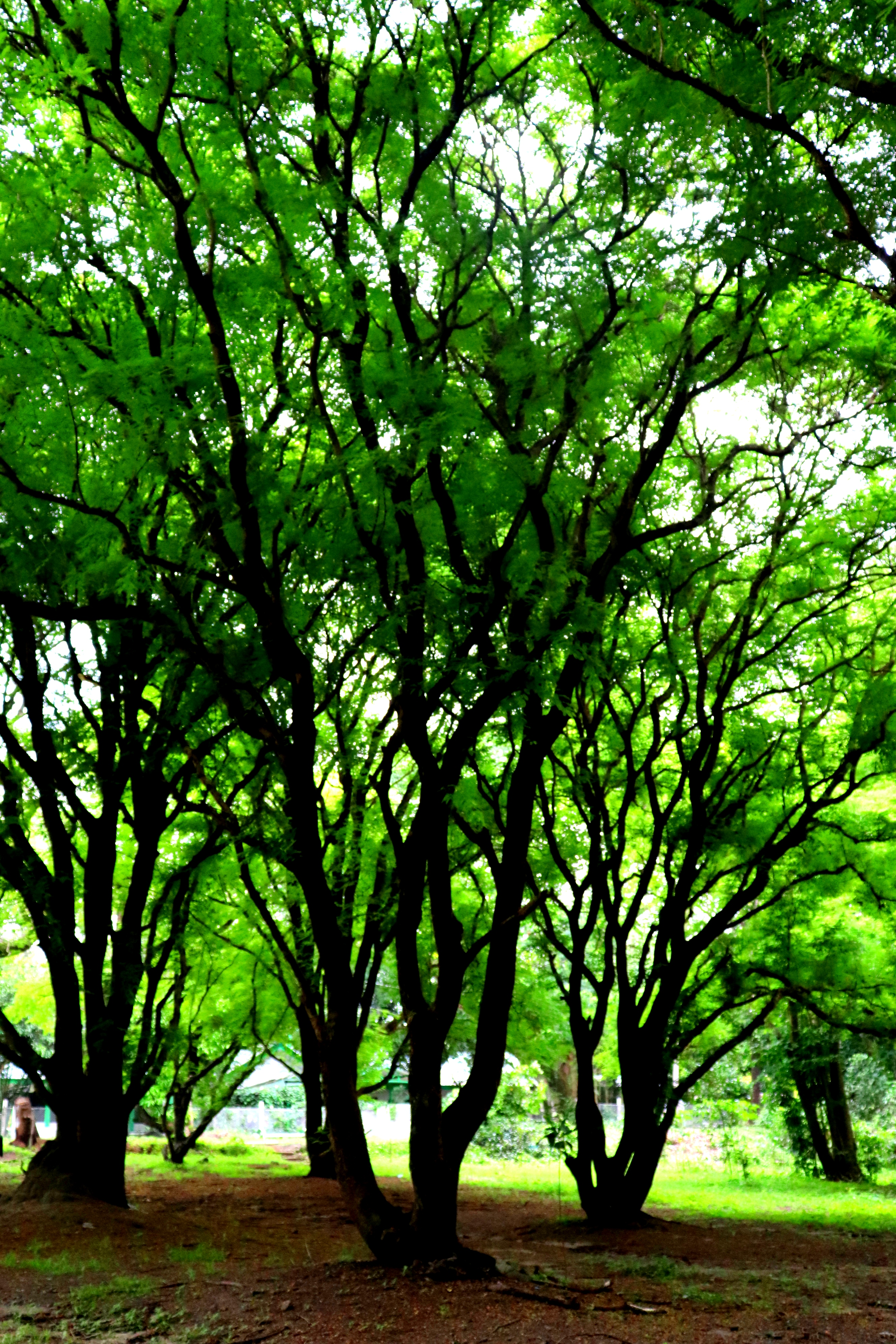
Tamarind tree

The tamarind plant has origins in India where it has been commonly utilized as a shade tree. In the 4th century BC tamarind was common among the Greeks and ancient Egyptians and has since been distributed and cultivated in over 50 countries worldwide, notably in Asia (in particular the Indian subcontinent), parts of the Middle East and Latin America. During the 16th century tamarind was introduced into Mexico where it became commonly used as a flavor of aguas frescas. Aguas frescas are a type of non-alcoholic beverage, comprising water, sugar and one or more seasonal fruits, seeds, cereals or flowers which are sold primarily in Mexico and other Latin American countries and have since been introduced into the United States. Aguas frescas are commonly sold at street vendors as well as at restaurants and taquerias and are traditionally served from an authentic Mexican glass dispenser (a vitrolero) with a ladle and poured over ice. Aguas frescas are beverages typically eaten with meals or as a refreshing beverage (usually consumed in the warmer months). Tamarindo is one of the many popular flavors of aguas frescas, alongside other flavors such as horchata and hibiscus.

== Ingredients ==
Tamarindo consists of a combination of 3 ingredients: tamarind, water and sugar.

=== Tamarind ===
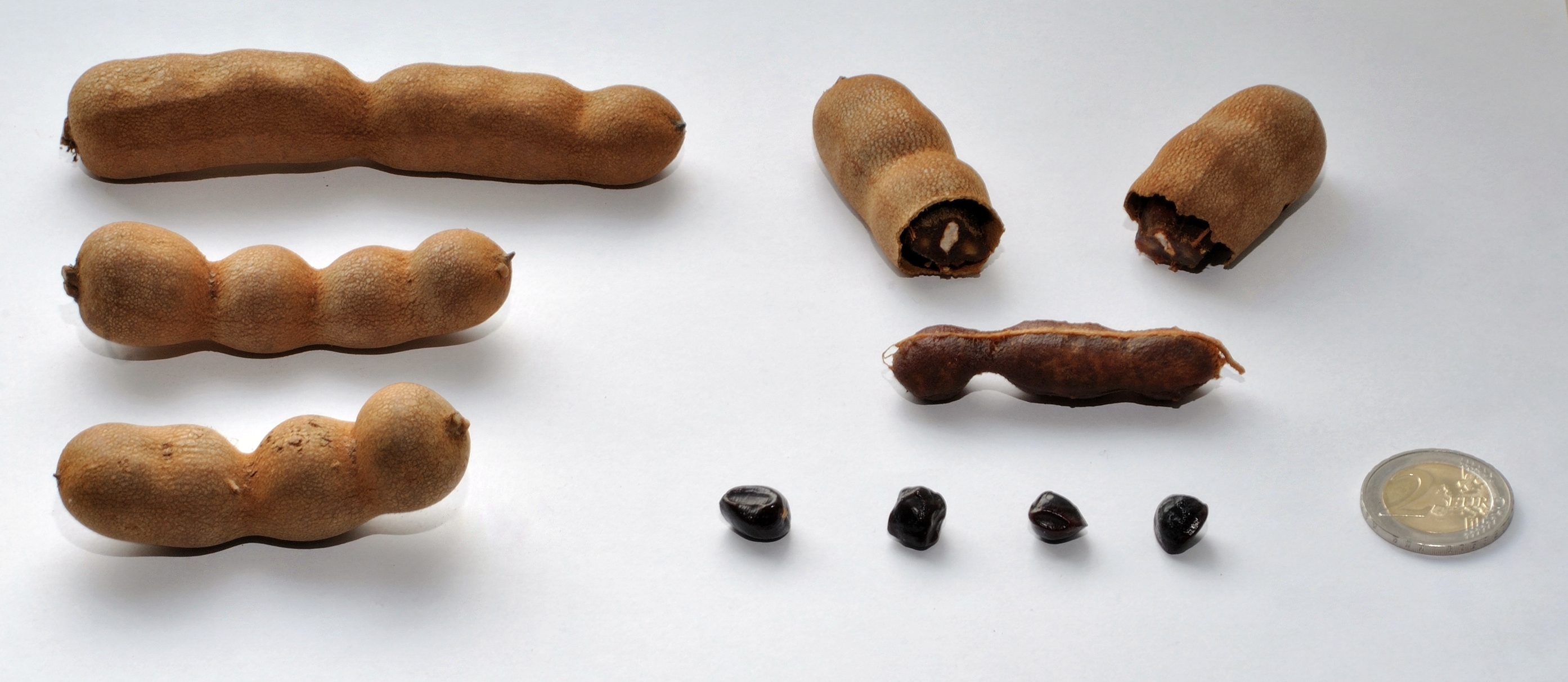
Tamarind pods, fruit and seeds

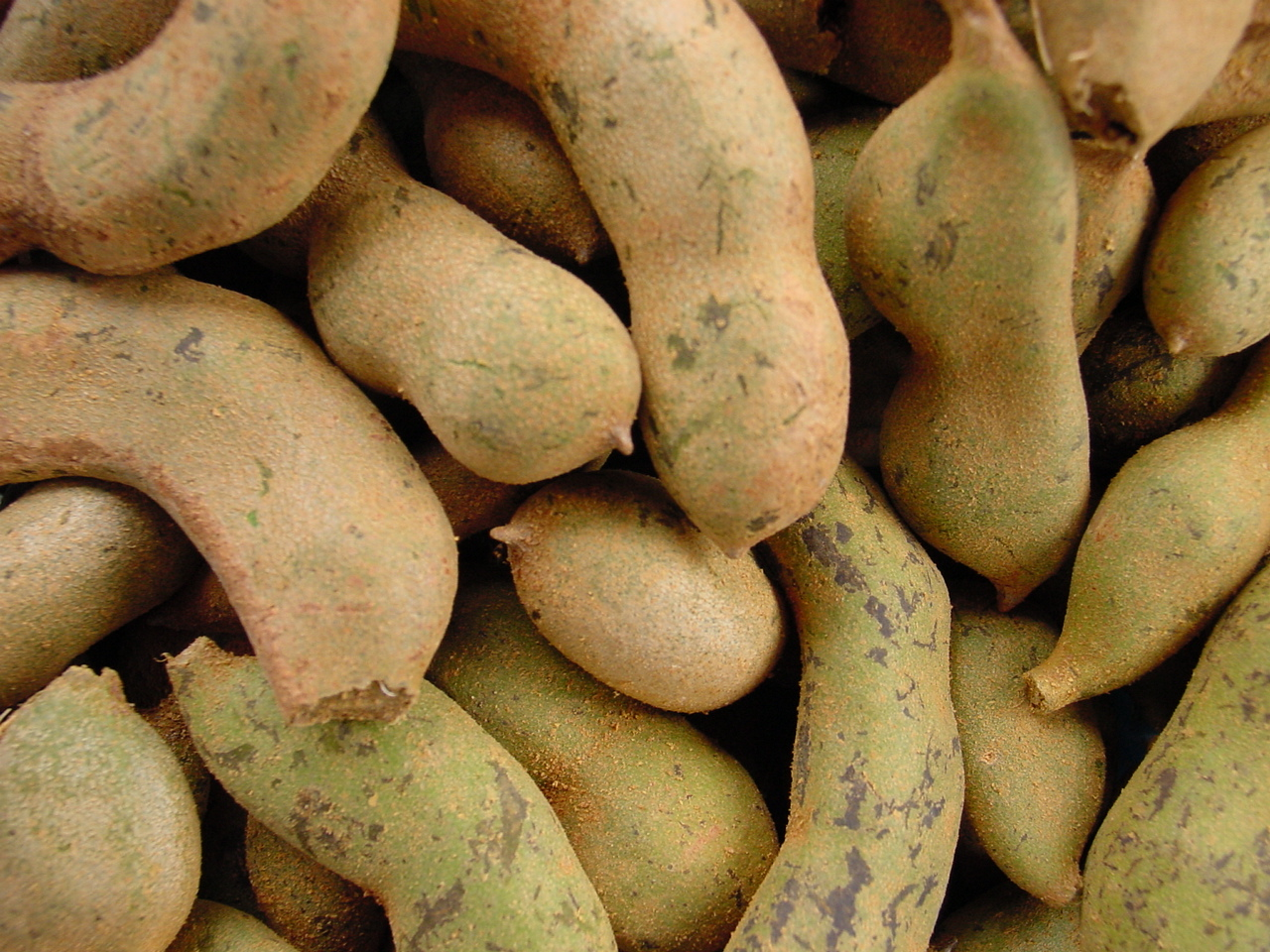
Tamarind pods

The primary ingredient of tamarindo, tamarind (also known as Tamarindus indica L), is a legume, part of the family Fabaceae. Tamarind grows on tamarind trees which are typically found in tropical regions and grow to 24 meters high on average. The trees produce fruit in abundance, on average, for 50 to 60 years but can live for over 200 years. Tamarind trees produce brown fruit pods that enclose one to twelve reddish-brown seeds as well as pulp. High levels of tartaric acid makes tamarind fruit highly acidic, this acid is also a common component of other sour fruits such as raspberries and grapes. Depending on the ripeness of the tamarind fruit the taste of the pulp can range from sour to sweet, the more ripe the tamarind fruit, the sweeter it tastes due to increased sugar levels that balance the proportion of tartaric acid. The pulp is the most commonly extracted part of the tamarind plant. Tamarind pulp contains high proportions of carbohydrates (41.1 to 61.4 grams per 100 grams) and low levels of fat (0.6 grams per 100 grams) and is high in various vitamins and minerals, including potassium (62 to 570 milligrams per 100g), calcium (81 to 466 milligrams per 100 grams) and phosphorus (86 to 190 milligrams per 100 grams).

==== Production ====
Mature and protected tamarind trees can produce up to 150 to 225 kilograms of tamarind fruit per year, however on average, tamarind trees produce between 30 and 50 kilograms of fruit annually. The tamarind fruit is most commonly produced in its sour form and accounts for 95% of tamarind production worldwide with India (in particular the states of Madhya Pradesh, West Bengal and Karnataka) and Thailand being the largest Asian producers of tamarind and Mexico as the largest producer of tamarind in the Western hemisphere. The majority of African countries do not produce tamarind commercially, but it is commonly utilized by the local people. The pharmaceutical industry in America is responsible for processing 100 tonnes of tamarind pulp annually.

== Production ==
There are different variations of tamarindo, however it is typically made by shelling the tamarind pods and adding them to boiling water. The pods are left to soak for approximately 45 minutes then the seeds are removed from the pods which leaves the pulp that is then strained through a sieve and blended with water and sugar. Store bought tamarind pulp can be used as an alternative to minimize the time required to prepare the tamarind pods. Once the ingredients are combined the beverage is served over ice. This process typically takes between 45 minutes to an hour to complete, but is dependent on if store bought tamarind pulp is used or how long the tamarind pods are left to soak. In the commercial production of tamarindo the beverage is carbonated, making it similar to a soft drink. The use of tamarind pulp in tamarindo makes the beverage a good source of potassium, calcium and carbohydrates and contains high levels of Vitamin B (Vitamin B1 - thiamine and Vitamin B3 - niacin) and small amounts of Vitamin C.

== Producers ==
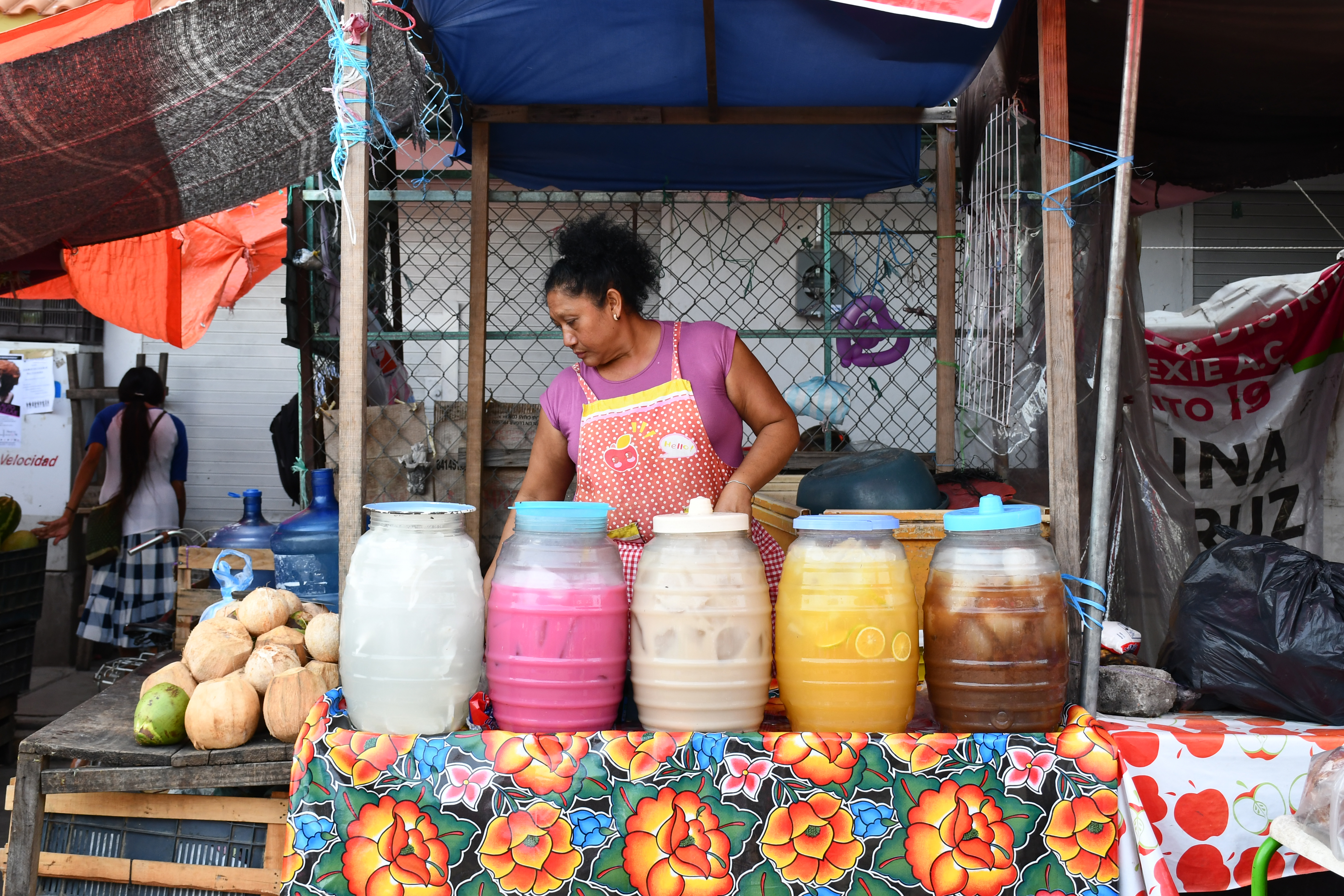
Street vendors selling Aguas Frescas

Tamarindo is traditionally sold at street vendors throughout Latin America. Street vendors play an important role in Latin American culture as they comprise a significant portion of the informal economy and are responsible for providing many employment opportunities for local people. Street vendors typically sell food, beverages, clothing and other daily use items and have become introduced into the United States by immigrants as a way to reproduce experiences similar to that in their home countries. Tamarindo, along with various other flavors of aguas frescas, are common products sold by street vendors, taquerias and restaurants in both Latin America and the United States. Tamarindo is now commercially produced by a range of companies, such as Jarritos and Nestle, and distributed globally. Jarritos is a Mexican soft drink brand that was established in 1950 and has since been distributed into the United States and internationally. Jarritos offers a range of flavors alongside Tamarindo, including Mandarin, Lime and Guava. Global food and beverage company, Nestle, introduced three Latin American inspired flavors into the United States in 2011 which included Tamarindo, Horchata and Jamaica.

As explored by documentarist Ebony Bailey in her documentary titled "Jamaica y Tamarindo: Afro Tradition in the Heart of Mexico," Afro-Mexicans have long developed a kinship tie with tamarindo. Alongside the coast of Guerrero, we see a thriving informal sector of Afro-Mexican vendors. Most Mexicans are unaware that tamarind is an African plant, leading to the erasure of African and Afro-Mexican culture and customs.

== Variations ==
There are a range of beverages, similar to tamarindo, that utilize tamarind as the primary component.

=== Poha Beer ===
Poha Beer is a tamarind based beverage, composed primarily of tamarind pulp in addition to spices, such as ginger and peppercorn, commonly consumed in Ghana. The preparation of Poha Beer involves seven key stages including: threshing (removal of the outer covering of the fruit), fermenting (the fruit is covered in water and left to ferment), molding (the fruit is molded into balls), soaking (the pulp is extracted by leaving the fruits to soak in warm or cold water), mashing (the fruits are mashed to extract more pulp), decanting (the removal of unwanted materials) and spicing (spices, such as ginger and peppercorns, are added to flavor).

=== Nam Ma Kham Wan ===
Nam Ma Kham Wan is a popular beverage consumed in Thailand made with tamarind pulp, water, salt and sugar. The tamarind pulp is mixed and blended with water then boiled. Salt and sugar are then added to the mixture which is then cooled and served over ice.

=== Nuoc Da Me ===
Nuoc Da Me is a tamarind based beverage typically consumed in Vietnam. It is a simple drink to make involving tamarind pulp being mixed with sugar and water which is then served over a glass filled with ice, water and any type of nut (usually peanuts).

=== Imli Ka Amlana ===
Imli Ka Amlana is a tamarind based beverage consumed in India made by combining various spices (usually black salt, black pepper, cardamom powder and cumin powder) and sugar with tamarind pulp and serving it chilled over ice. Imli Ka Amlana was made available for commercial consumption by Paper Boats but the product has now since been discontinued.

== See also ==
- Tamarind juice
