= Agua fresca =

Mexican non-alcoholic beverage

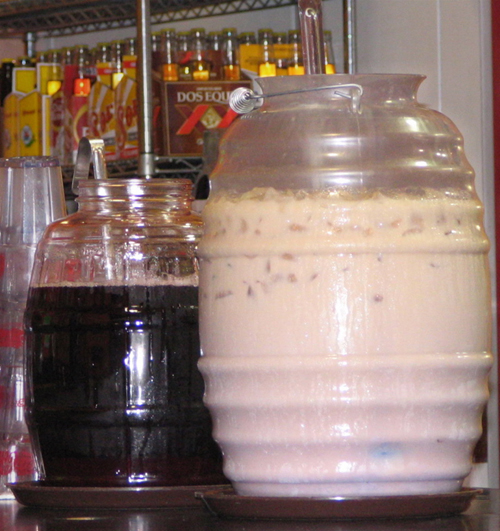
- Two types of aguas frescas in a Mexican taqueria in Seattle. On the left is a jar of agua de flor de Jamaica, and on the right is horchata.
- Alternative names: "frescos", "aguas"
- Type: non-alcoholic beverage
- Place of origin: Mexico (Disputed)
- Region or state: Latin America
- Serving temperature: Cold
- Main ingredients: Fruit, water, and sugar
- Variations: Many variants, especially regional, with various ingredients and toppings

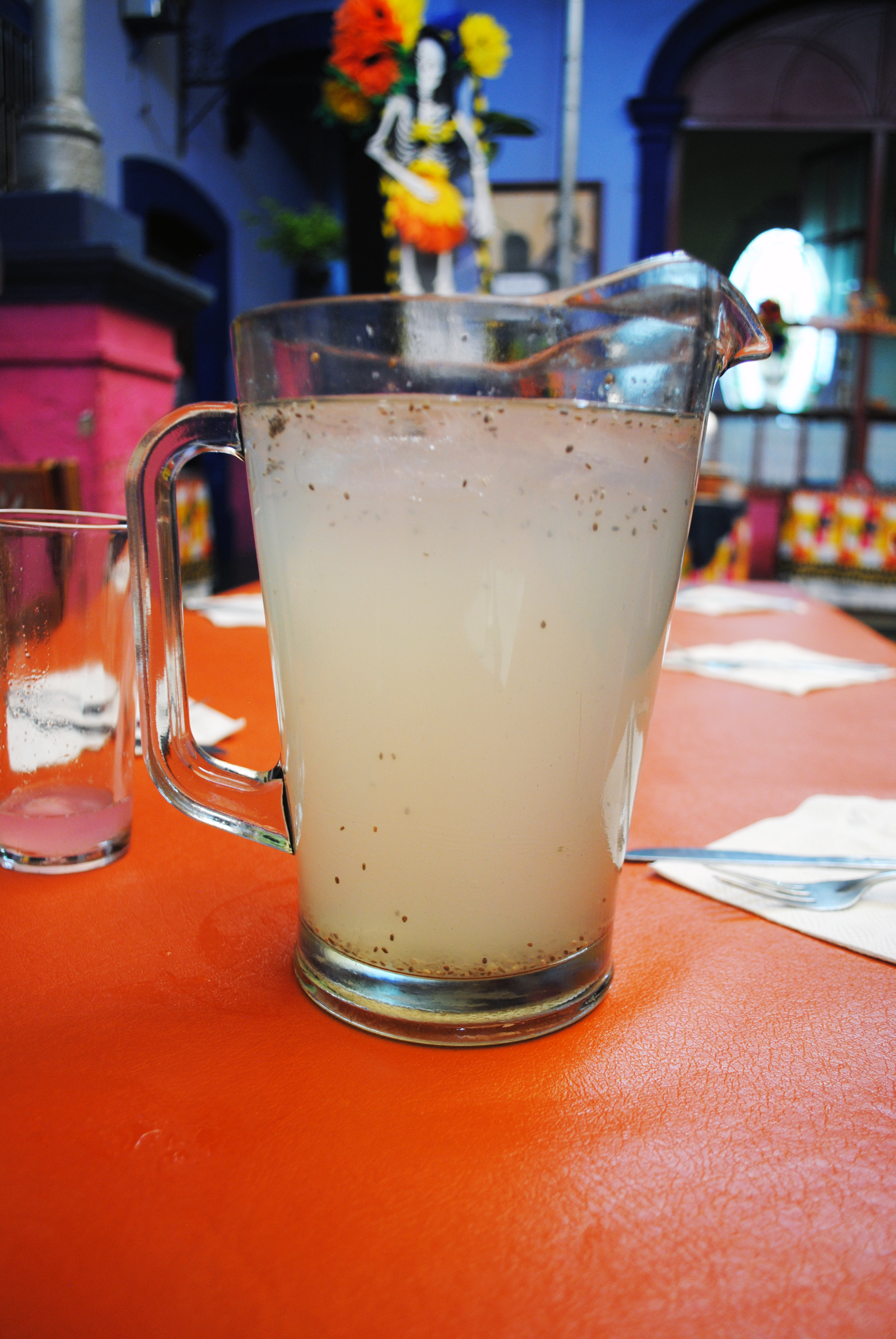
Chia seed agua fresca

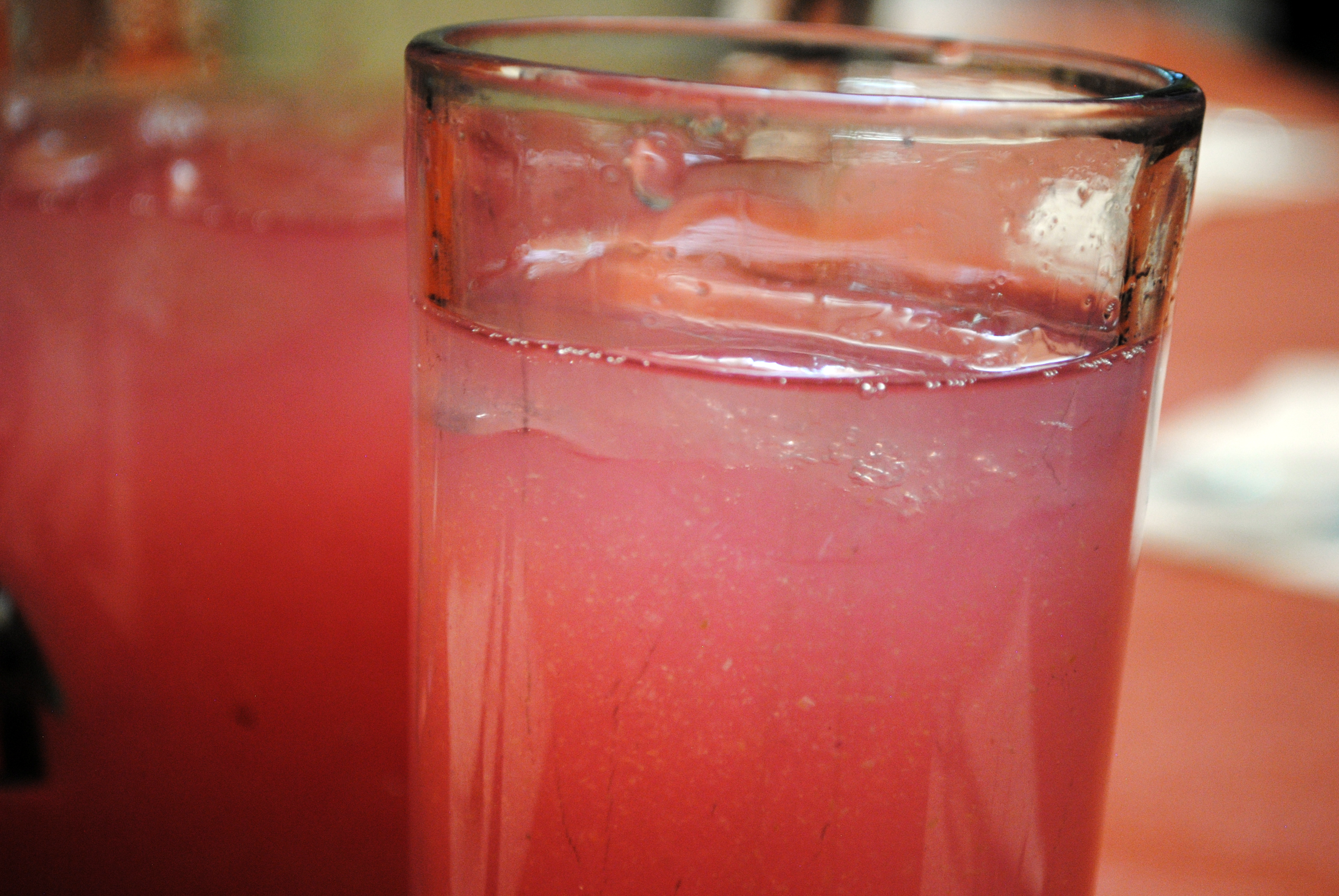
Guava agua fresca

Aguas frescas (English: cool waters, lit. 'fresh waters') or frescos or aguas, are light traditionally non-alcoholic beverages made from one or more fruits, cereals, flowers, or seeds blended with sugar and water. The drinks are ladled from the jars into glasses. They are popular in many Latin American countries, as well as parts of the United States such as the Southwest and heavy-Latino population cities, such as Los Angeles and San Antonio. Some of the more common varieties include tamarindo, jamaica, and horchata.

Aguas frescas are sold by street vendors and are commonly found in convenience stores, restaurants and juice bars.

== History ==
People have been flavoring water with fruit and flowers in Mexico since ancient times. The Aztec people of Tenochtitlan gathered fruit and flowers as they traveled by canoe along the city's canals and prepared early versions of these drinks for hydration. Sugar, today the most common sweetener, was introduced after the Spanish conquest of the early 16th century, which also brought Old World ingredients that diversified the category: hibiscus (Jamaica), tamarind came to the Americas from Africa and Asia through colonial trade networks; and rice, cinnamon, and barley became the basis of horchata. These beverages are typically made by blending fresh ingredients with water and lightly sweetening them, resulting in refreshing drinks especially suited to hot climates. Outside Mexico, aguas frescas have grown significantly in the United States. Industry analysts at Technomic report that their popularity is growing faster than lemonade, driven by demand from both Latin American communities and younger consumers seeking lower- sugar alternatives to carbonated soft drinks, as well as interest in natural ingredients and traditional preparations.

== Terminology ==
The terms aguas frescas is most common in Mexico, however, they are called "fresco" in Nicaragua and Honduras. Frescos refers to non-carbonated drinks, usually referring to traditional drinks, or those made from fruits. Some of them include fresco de Cacao, melon con naranja, chicha, pinolillo, and others.

Aguas frescas could lead to confusion in some Spanish speaking countries, as they may refer to bottled soft drinks. In Costa Rica, Guatemala, Honduras, and Panamá soft drinks are referred to as "frescos" (short for refresco), which in Mexico means soft drinks and in Nicaragua means aguas frescas. Soft drinks in Guatemala are called "aguas", short for aguas gaseosas, which could easily be confused with the Mexican aguas frescas or Nicaraguan soft drinks which are called gaseosas.

== Types ==
It is common to find aguas frescas in these flavors:

Type	Ingredients
Sweet fruits	Cantaloupe; Guava; Grape; Mango; Melon; Orange; Papaya; Passion fruit; Peach; Prickly pear; Raspberry; Coconut; Soursop; Strawberry; Watermelon
Sour fruits	Cucumber; Lemon; Lime; Pineapple; Pitaya; Tamarind
Seeds	Chía (often blended with vegetables); Jicaro
Cereals	Cebada; Horchata
Flowers	Alfalfa; Hibiscus tea (also called "agua de (Flor de) Jamaica" or "sorrel", popular also in Jamaica and West Africa); Vanilla

== See also ==
- Licuados
- Paleta (dessert)
- Samalamig
