= Licuado =

Latin American beverage

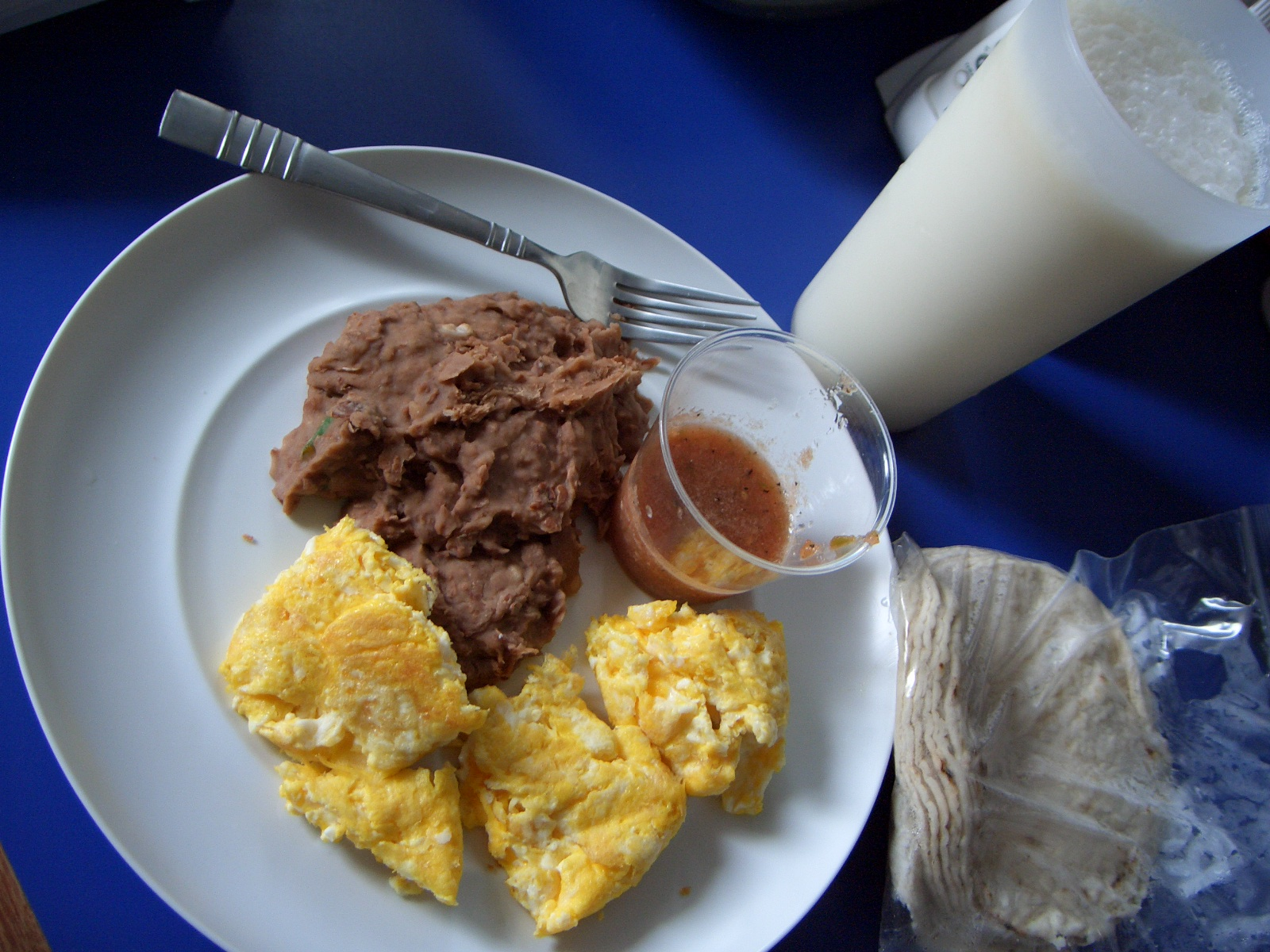
Mexican-style breakfast with a licuado

Licuados (also known regionally as batidos) are a Latin American handmade blended beverage similar to smoothies, made with milk, fruit, and usually ice. They are also sometimes called "preparados" (meaning "prepared").

Licuados and other fresh fruit juice drinks are ubiquitous throughout Mexico. They are sold by street vendors, and in special licuado shops, restaurants, and fruterias (restaurants specializing in fresh fruit).

== Terminology and variations ==
Licuados ("blendeds" or "liquifieds" in Spanish) are among a larger category of fruit drinks made with fruit juice diluted with milk or water: jugos (juice), vitaminas, aguas frescas (juice mixed with sugar and water), refrescos (nonalcoholic carbonated soft drinks), and batidos. Names for various types of shakes and smoothies vary regionally, and are not completely fixed.

By contrast with aguas frescas, which are made in advance and ladled from large jars, and other drinks such as refrescos and jugos, which are typically mass-produced and bottled, licuados are blended and made to order. The main difference between a licuado and an American-style smoothie is that licuados use a milk base, whereas smoothies use fruit juice, sometimes in combination with sherbet or yogurt. This makes them lower in calories, thinner, and higher in protein than most smoothies, especially important in the developing state of many of the Latin American countries such as Honduras and Nicaragua. Licuados may also contain nuts (such as almonds or walnuts) and sugar or honey. Variants include adding granola or using chocolate instead of fruit. Versions with raw egg fruit and milk, Americanized version substitute fruit with milk flavorings such as (quik).

Sometimes batidos (loosely meaning "beaten") are said to have milk, with licuados described as a milk-free version. The term "batido" is described by some as Cuban. Different flavors of licuados or batidos have specific names, usually named after their ingredients. For example, a "trigo" (Spanish for "wheat") or "batido de trigo" is a batido with puffed wheat or other cooked grains blended in.

== Popularity outside Latin America ==
Licuados became popular in the United States in the 1990s during a period of immigration from Latin American countries. By 1996 the drink had arrived in New York City, where it was sold by street vendors. Already popular in border towns such as Tijuana (where they are a breakfast food) the drink spread to California, first among Mexican-Americans and at Mexican restaurants and food trucks. In 2002, the California Milk Processor Board spent $1.5 million to popularize the drink, as a way of promoting milk consumption following their success with the Got Milk? campaign.

== Equivalent drinks ==
A similar drink, called sinh tố in Vietnam, is popular in Southeast Asia.
