= Valentina (hot sauce) =

Mexican brand of hot sauce

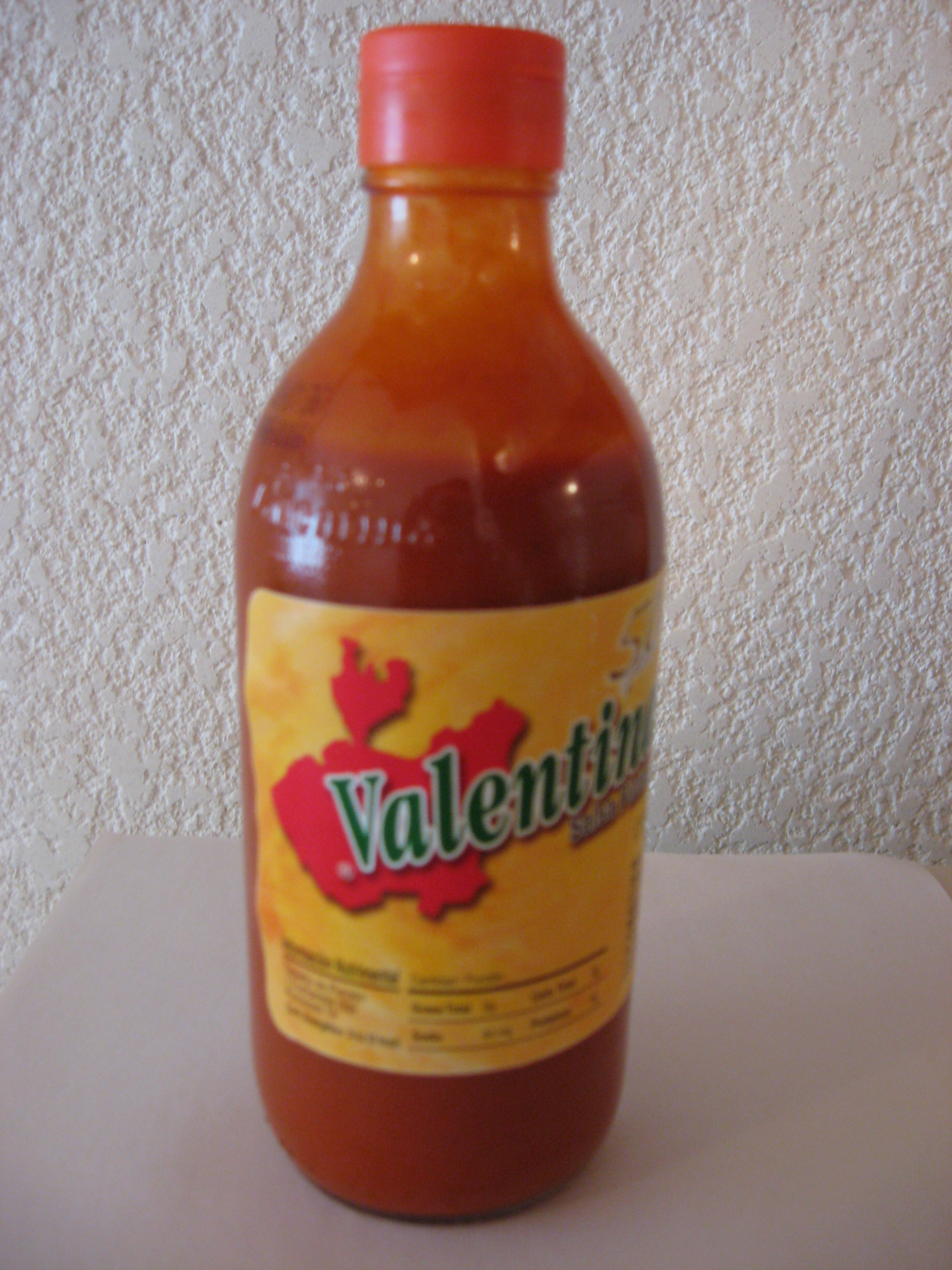
- Bottle of Valentina hot sauce
- Product type: Hot sauce
- Country: Guadalajara, Mexico
- Introduced: February 14, 1954
- Markets: North America, South America
- Website: www.salsavalentina.com

Valentina is a Mexican hot sauce brand manufactured by Salsa Tamazula, a company based in Guadalajara. Like the parent company's Tamazula hot sauce, Valentina is made with puya chilis from the state of Jalisco, similar to the Guajillo chili which is known by the name guajillo puya.

Valentina is typically sold in 12.5-ounce and large (one-liter or 34-ounce) glass bottles, with a flip-top cap permanently attached to the bottle. The cap does not unscrew. The red shape on the label is an outline of the Mexican state of Jalisco. Valentina is described as thicker than Tabasco sauce and less vinegary, with more chili flavor. It comes in two varieties: hot (900 Scoville Heat Units) and extra hot (2100 SHU). The sauce is known for its taste and its use as a condiment on several Mexican foods, especially street fare. Valentina's ingredients are water, chili peppers, vinegar, salt, spices, and the preservative sodium benzoate.

The sauce is named after Valentina Ramírez Avitia, a Mexican revolutionary.

== See also ==
- List of hot sauces
- Scoville heat scale
