= ¡Mucha Lucha! =

American animated television series

- Title card
- Also known as: ¡Mucha Lucha!: Gigante (season 3)
- Genre: Sports (lucha libre); Comedy; Slapstick
- Created by: Eddie Mort; Lili Chin
- Developed by: Michael Ryan; Eddie Mort; Lili Chin
- Directed by: Alfred Gimeno (season 1); Ken Kessel (seasons 2–3); Collette Sunderman (voice director: Los Angeles)
- Voices of: Carlos Alazraqui (seasons 1–2); Jason Marsden (season 3); Kimberly Brooks; Candi Milo
- Theme music composer: Chicos de Barrio
- Opening theme: ¡Mucha Lucha! performed by Chicos de Barrio
- Composers: Michael Tavera (seasons 1–2); Mambotron (season 3)
- Country of origin: United States
- Original language: English
- No. of seasons: 3
- No. of episodes: 52 (list of episodes)

Production
- Executive producer: Sander Schwartz
- Producers: Joel Kuwahara; Alfred Gimeno (season 1); Michael Ryan (season 1); Eddie Mort (seasons 2–3); Lili Chin (seasons 2–3); Ken Kessel (seasons 2–3); Jim Krieg (seasons 2–3)
- Running time: 22 minutes
- Production companies: Warner Bros. Family Entertainment; Warner Bros. Animation (Note: Credited as Warner Bros. Television Animation from 2002 to 2003.)

Original release
- Network: Kids' WB (US); Cartoon Network (internationally)
- Release: August 17, 2002 – February 26, 2005

¡Mucha Lucha! (subtitled Gigante during its third and final season) is an American animated television series that aired on the Kids' WB block on The WB from August 17, 2002, to February 26, 2005. It was created by Eddie Mort and Lili Chin and produced by Warner Bros. Animation. It is the first animated television series intended for children created with Macromedia Flash, a program which became widely used as a medium for animation in the following years.

A direct-to-video feature film based on the series, ¡Mucha Lucha!: The Return of El Maléfico, was released on January 4, 2005.

== Premise ==
The show is set in Luchaville, a fictional town in Southern California centered on Mexican wrestling –specifically, the wrestling style known as lucha Libre– where nearly everyone wears a costume (they are never seen without their mask) and has a well-known wrestling move. These wrestling moves being capable of transforming the character in relation to the naming of the move. The series mainly centres on three friends, Rikochet, Buena Girl, and the Flea, as they struggle through the Foremost World-Renowned International School of Lucha, where they study to become wrestlers.

== Episodes ==
Season	Episodes	Originally released	
Season	Episodes	First released	Last released
1	13	August 17, 2002	February 8, 2003
2	26	September 13, 2003	January 21, 2005
Film		January 4, 2005	
3	13	September 11, 2004	February 26, 2005

== Characters ==
- Rikochet (voiced by Carlos Alazraqui in seasons 1–2 and Jason Marsden in season 3) – A young 10-year-old wrestler who is the protagonist of the series. He considers himself the bravest of the group, but sometimes leaps before he looks. His signature move is the Pulverizing Pinball.
- Buena Girl (voiced by Kimberly Brooks) – A smart, young 9-year-old female wrestler who always plays by the rules. She can also be very arrogant and obnoxious at times. Her signature move is the Buena Bulldozer of Truth.
- The Flea (voiced by Candi Milo) – An 8-year-old friend of Rikochet and Buena Girl who is always dirty and refers to himself in the third person. As well as having a few disgusting habits, he is also the most nervous but often proves to be a useful ally.

== Production ==
¡Mucha Lucha! ran into a problem when initially pitched to Kids' WB, as the network did not want actual wrestling shown on screen due to seeming violent. Series co-creator Lili Chin would have to draw visual guides to show that actual wrestling was more choreography than harmful acts of violence.

=== Music ===
==== Licensed music ====
- Café Quijano - Desde Brasil
- Los Miserables - Punk Rock Y Subversion
- Celso Piña - Cumbia Poder
- Tito Nieves - Shut Up
- Frankie Negron - So Wonderful
- Plastiko - Esfera De Cristal
- Pesado - Entre Mi Corazón Tu Y Yo
- El Tri - Nosotros Los Latinos
- SNZ - Me Protejo
- Bacilos - Bésela Ya
- Charlie Cruz - Un Chin Chin
- Volumen Cero - Hollywood
- Los Lobos - Good morning aztlán

== Broadcast ==
The series has been broadcast on Kids' WB in the United States, Teletoon in Canada, CITV and Kix in the United Kingdom and Canal 5 in Mexico from August 17, 2002, until February 26, 2005. It also premiered on Cartoon Network internationally in 2003, and in the U.S in 2004. In March 2007, repeats of the series began airing on Miguzi, and was later replaced with Ben 10 for the last slot before Miguzi was shut down that same year. Repeats continued to air from 2008 to 2009, and it was removed from the lineup in 2010.

== Home media ==
Warner Home Video released one compilation on VHS and Region 1 DVD that contained the first six-segment episodes from season one, titled Heart of Lucha, on August 19, 2003. The direct-to-video movie The Return of El Maléfico was released on October 5, 2004, exclusive to Walmart stores, while other retailers released it on January 4, 2005, during the series' third and final season.

In 2019, ¡Mucha Lucha! was available remastered for the first time in High Definition for home viewers and became available on demand through Amazon Prime.

Since 2022, the show became available for streaming on HBO Max in Latin American countries, also using the High Definition remasters.

As of 2026, the series has yet to have a complete series DVD box set.

== Merchandise ==
A toy line based on the show was released by Jakks Pacific in 2004. The toy line included "Mix-a-Lot" action figures; these had removable body parts that could be placed on the bodies of other action figures in the series. "Signature Move" action figures were also released, along with a toy wrestling ring. However, the second series of the toy line was cancelled.

During the summer of 2003, DC Comics published a three-issue mini-series of comic books based on ¡Mucha Lucha!. All three of the stories featured in these comic books were written by Eddie Mort, and have even been occasionally referenced in the TV series.

1. El Rey, Come Home!
2. It's All Buena!
3. Limbo of the Lost Luchadores!

The show was licensed for a Game Boy Advance video game, Mascaritas of the Lost Code, in late 2003; a PlayStation 2 video game, Mysterioso Grande, was slated for release, but was cancelled around 2004, as the creators could not find a publisher.

In 2005, the Mexican snack company Sabritas distributed promotional items in the form of Tazos with a picture of various characters from the show. Totaling 230 pogs, they were sold in two separate series. The first series is referred to as the "classic" series, while the second series is referred to as the "rematch" series.

== Proposed revival ==
In 2014, a revival called ¡Mucha Lucha! Para Siempre was proposed which would have centered on Rikochet, Buena Girl, and the Flea as teenagers.

== See also ==
- Professional wrestling in Mexico
- Chicos de Barrio
- El Santo
- Blue Demon
