= Patacó =

Catalan traditional game

El patacó is a traditional game played by children in Catalonia in which the patacons are turned upside down, hit with the palm of the hand and, if they turn around, they win.

It is a game of aim, dexterity and luck that can be played both on the street and at home and there are many game modes. Its origin is in the word "patac" ‘violent and sudden strike’.

== Game pieces ==
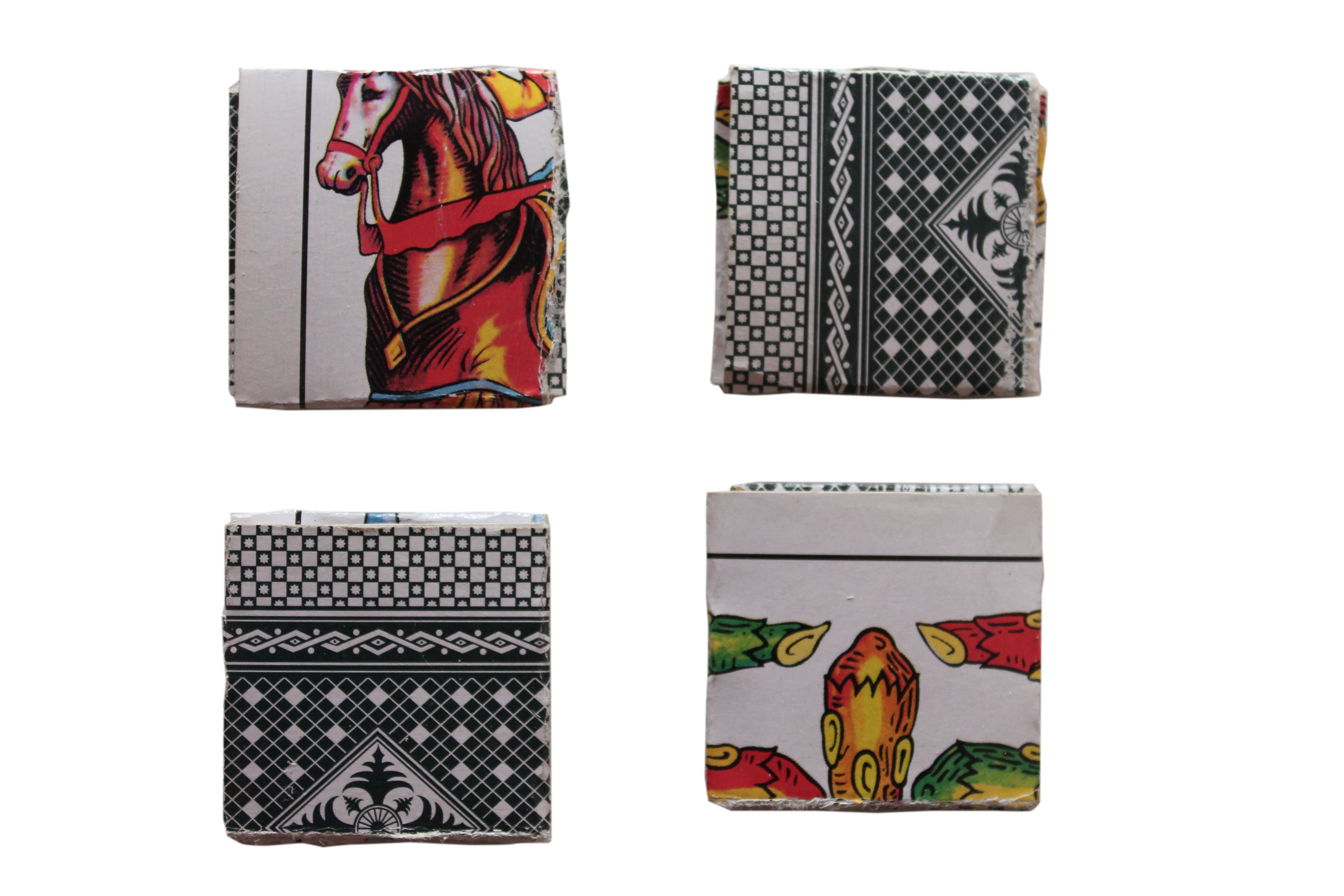
"Patacons" front and back faces

The traditional patacó is a more or less square piece made with a couple of pieces of cardboard usually made from a Spanish playing cards or a box of matches, folded and fitted together the way they can be distinguished between front and back.

The construction procedure begins by splitting a card in half, leaving two equal parts. The two pieces are then placed on top of each other in the form of an angle of 90 degrees and the piece is bent in a horizontal position backwards and then folded forward again. The same is done with the vertical piece and finally the free piece is fitted in the slot formed by the other folds. The two sides of the patacó must be different in order to distinguish the front and the back faces.

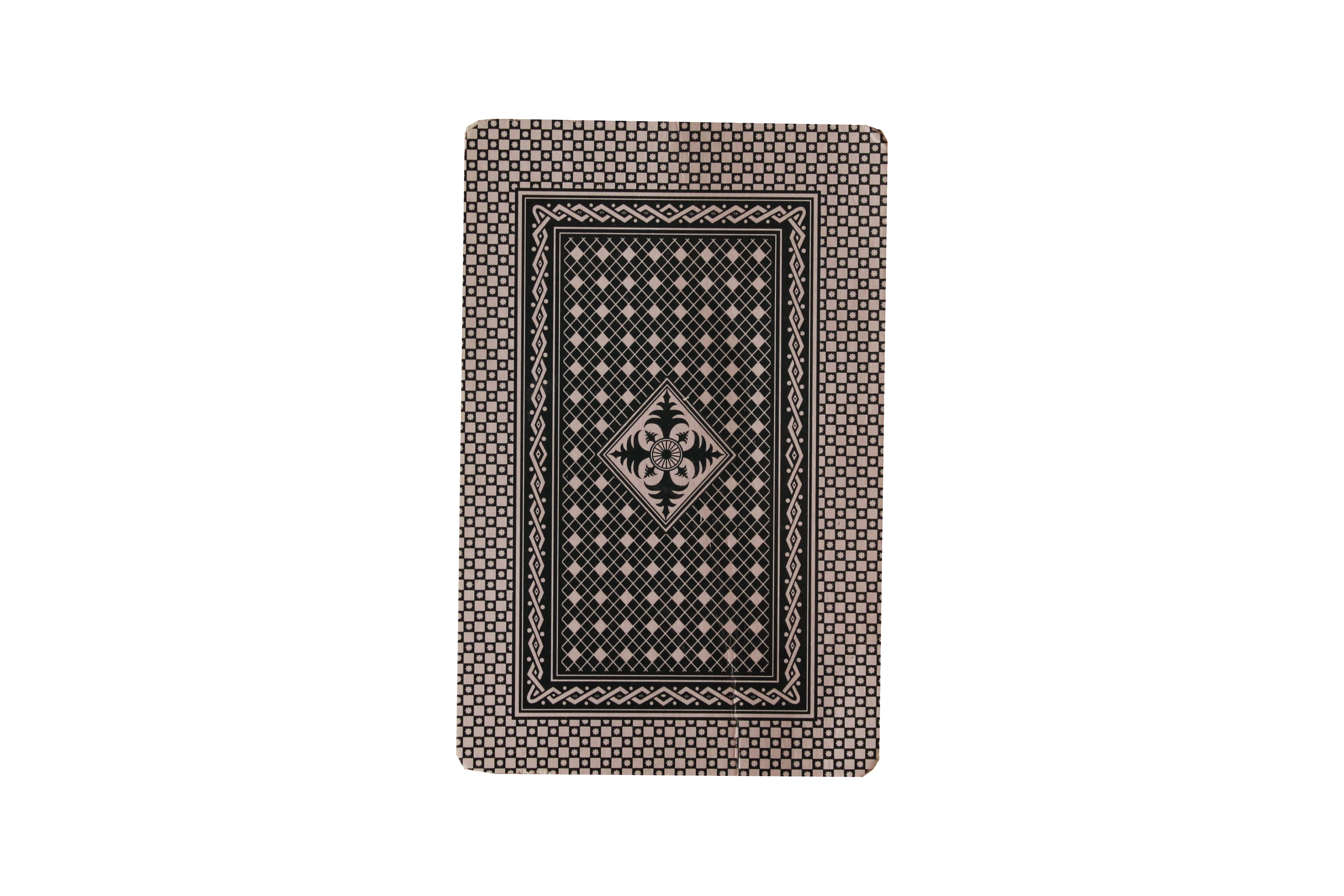
1. Spanish card back view

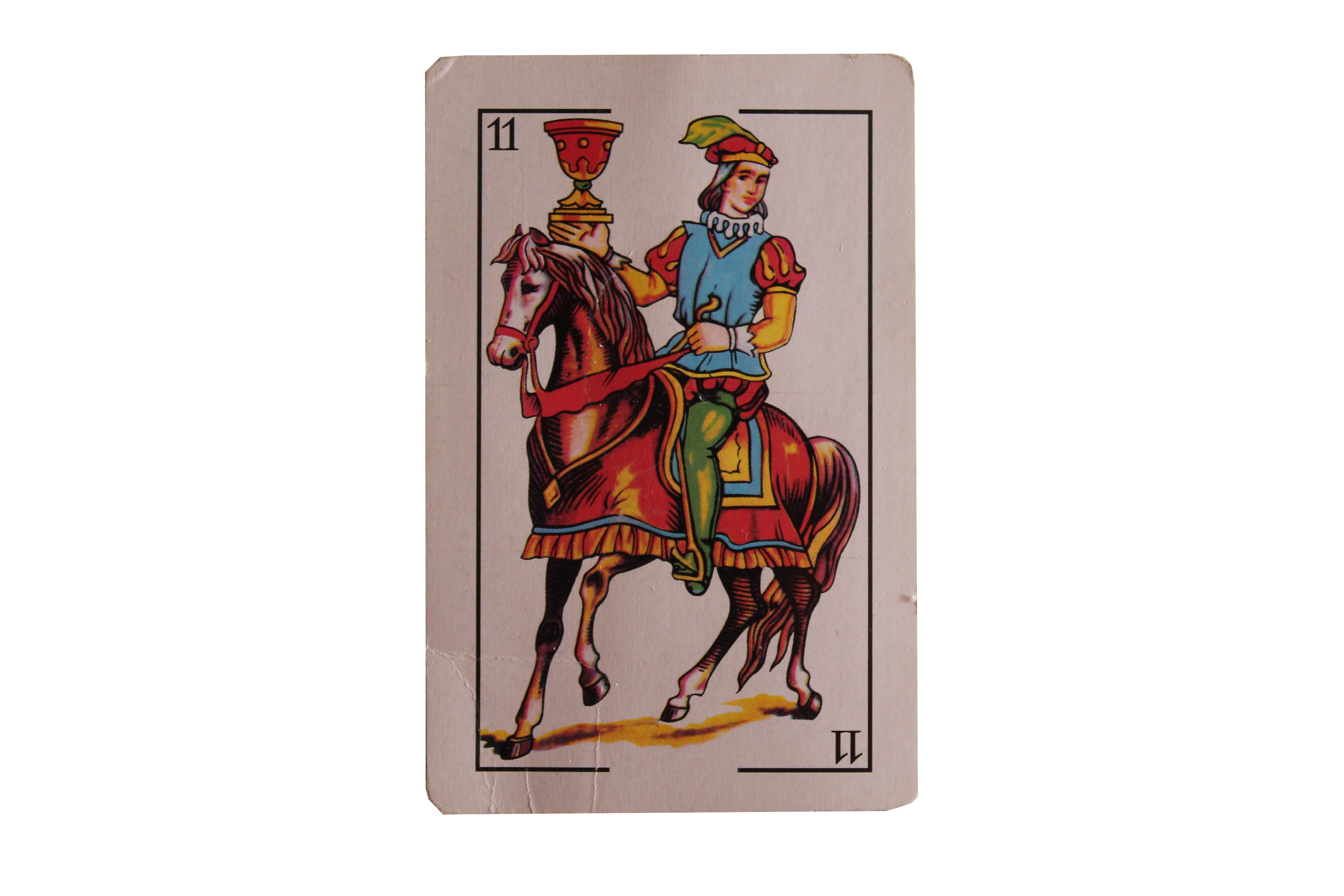
2. Spanish card front view

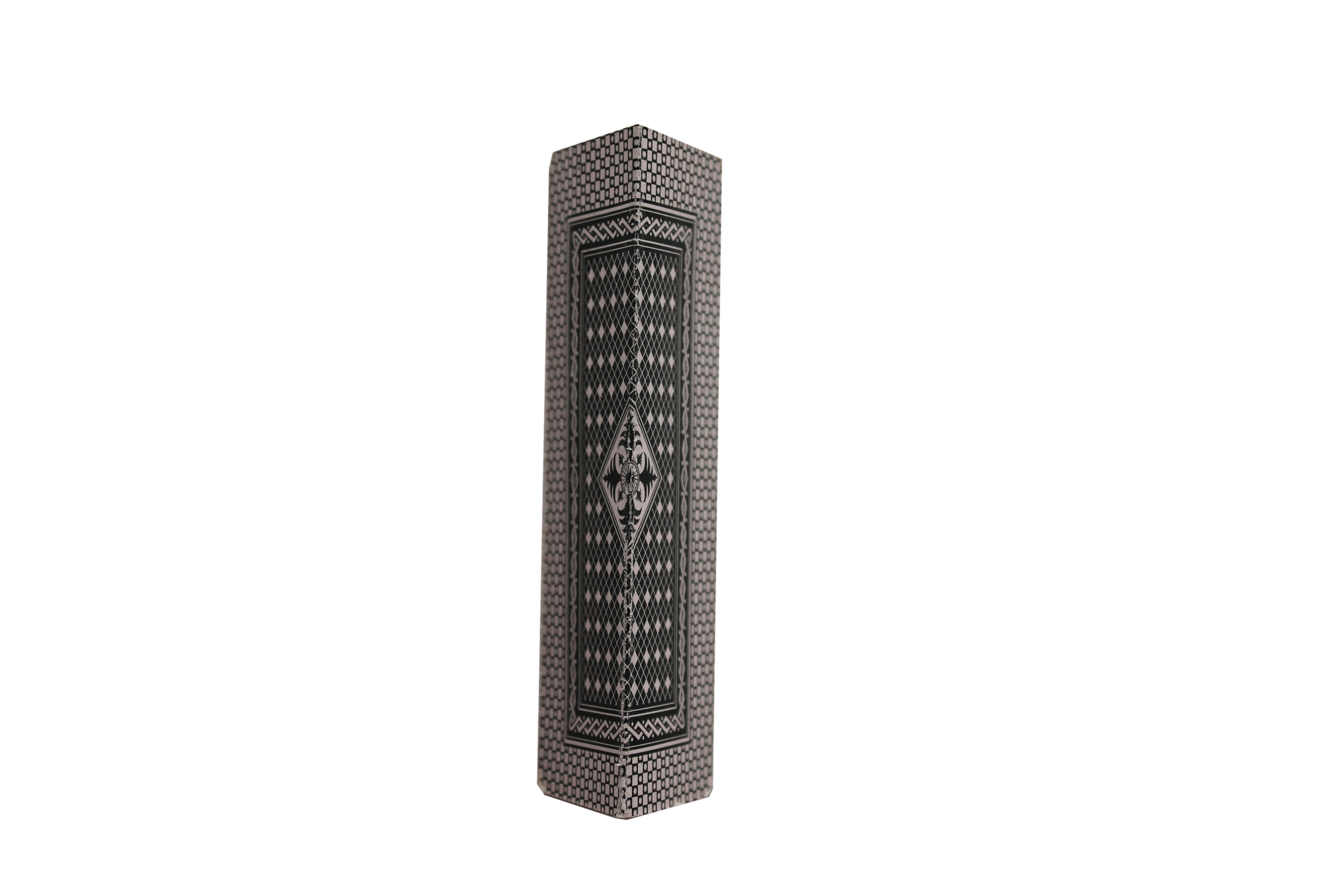
3. Fold up the middle

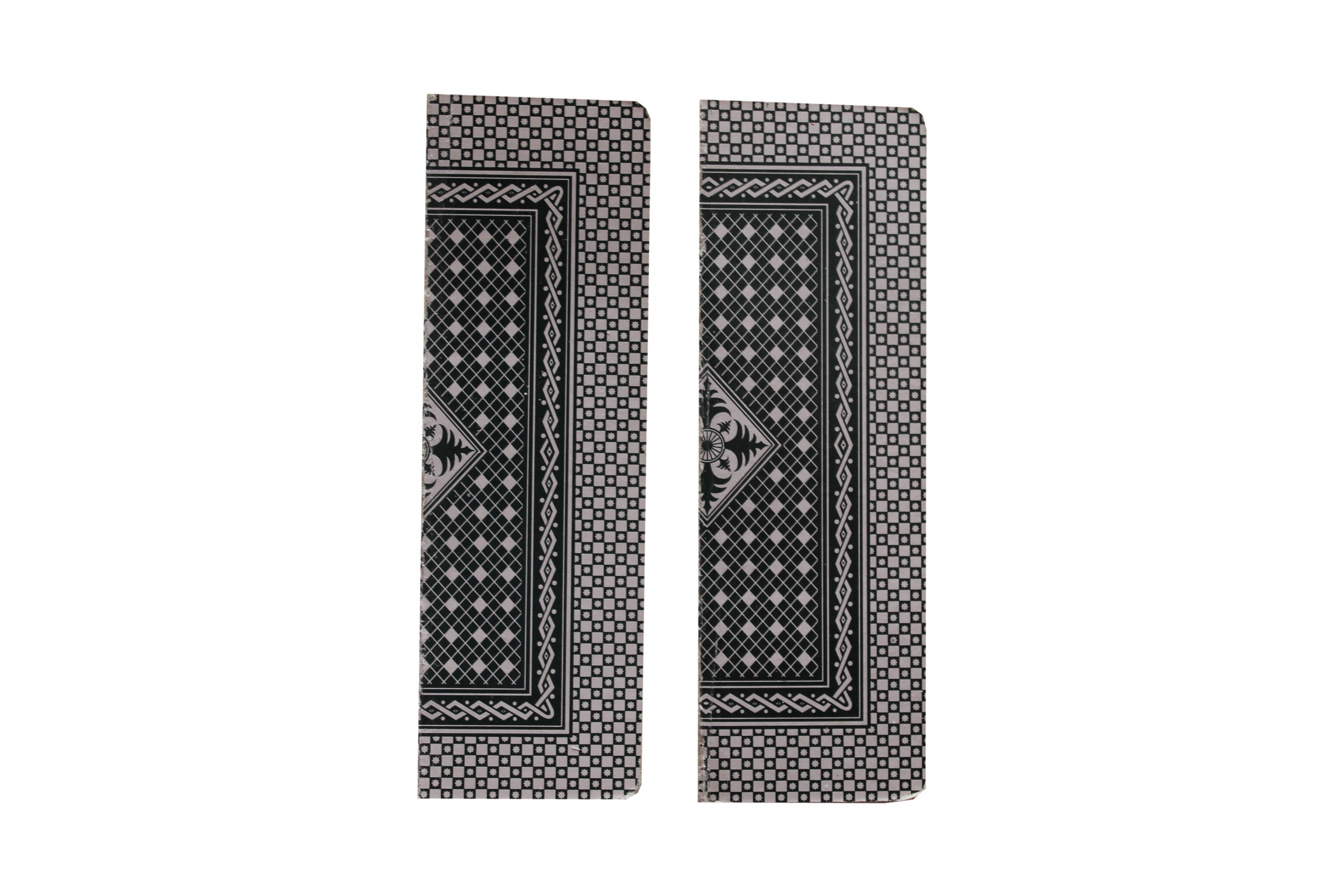
4. Cut down the middle obtaining two equal parts

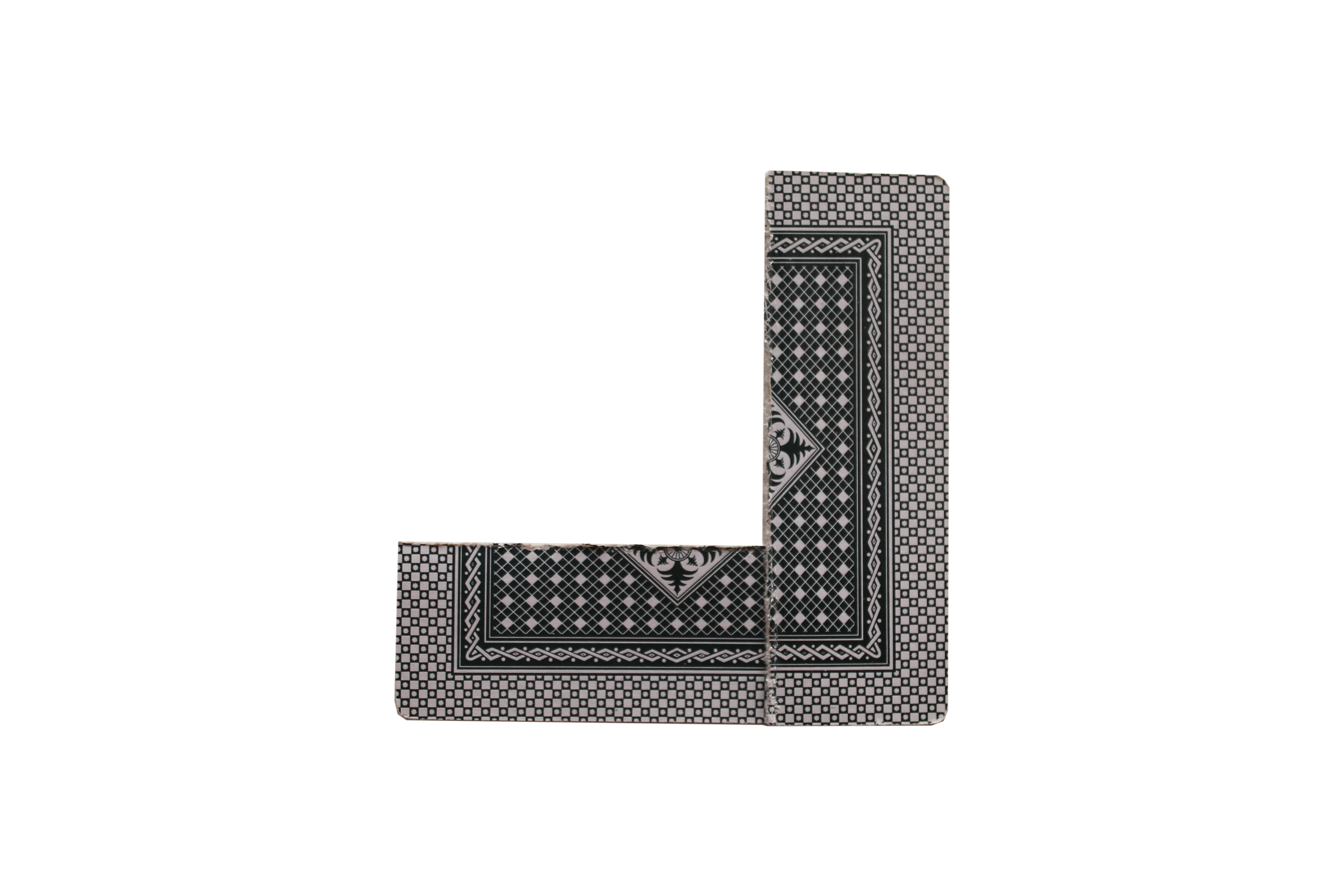
5. The two parts are placed at an angle of 90°

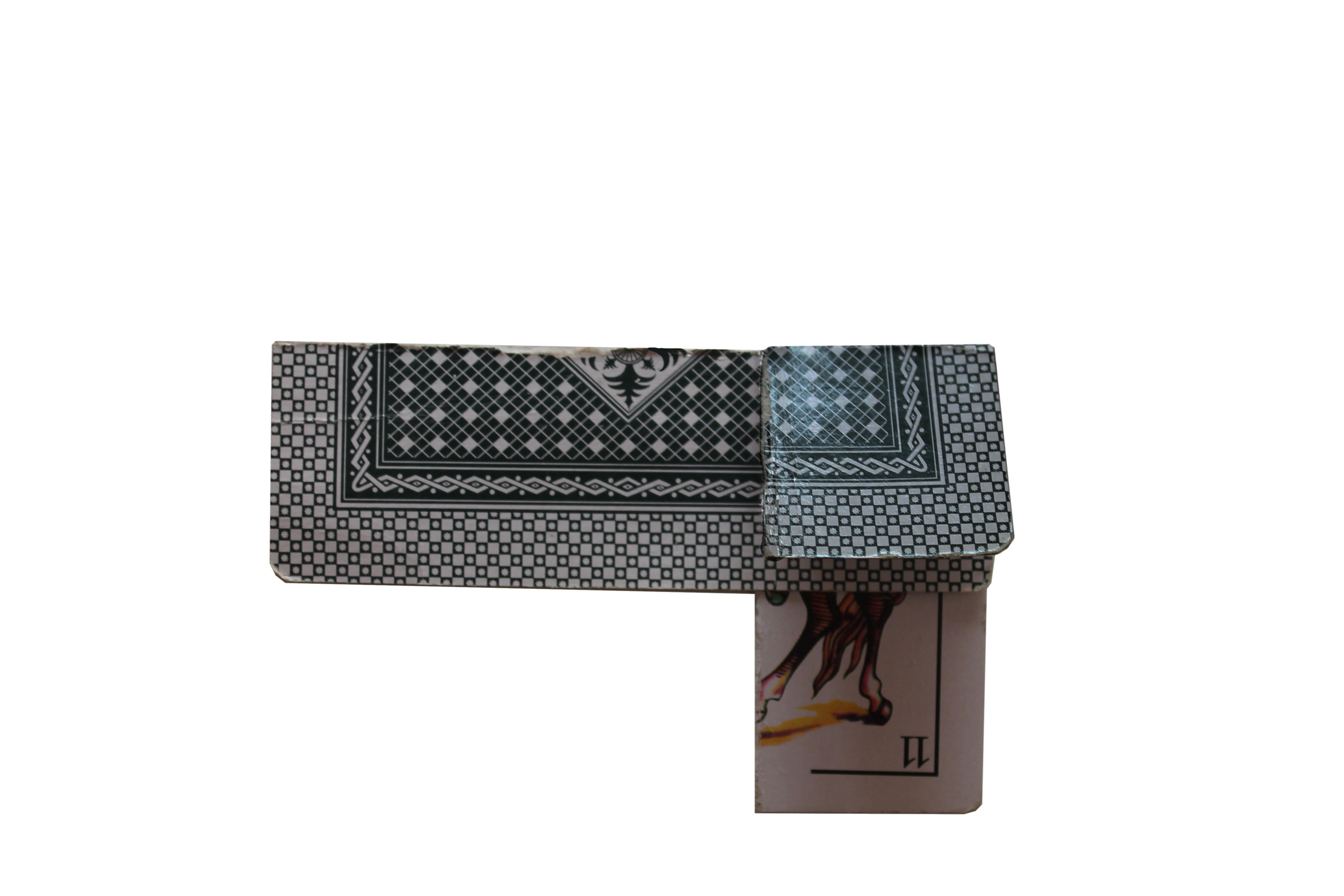
6. The vertical part is folded into thirds around the horizontal part.

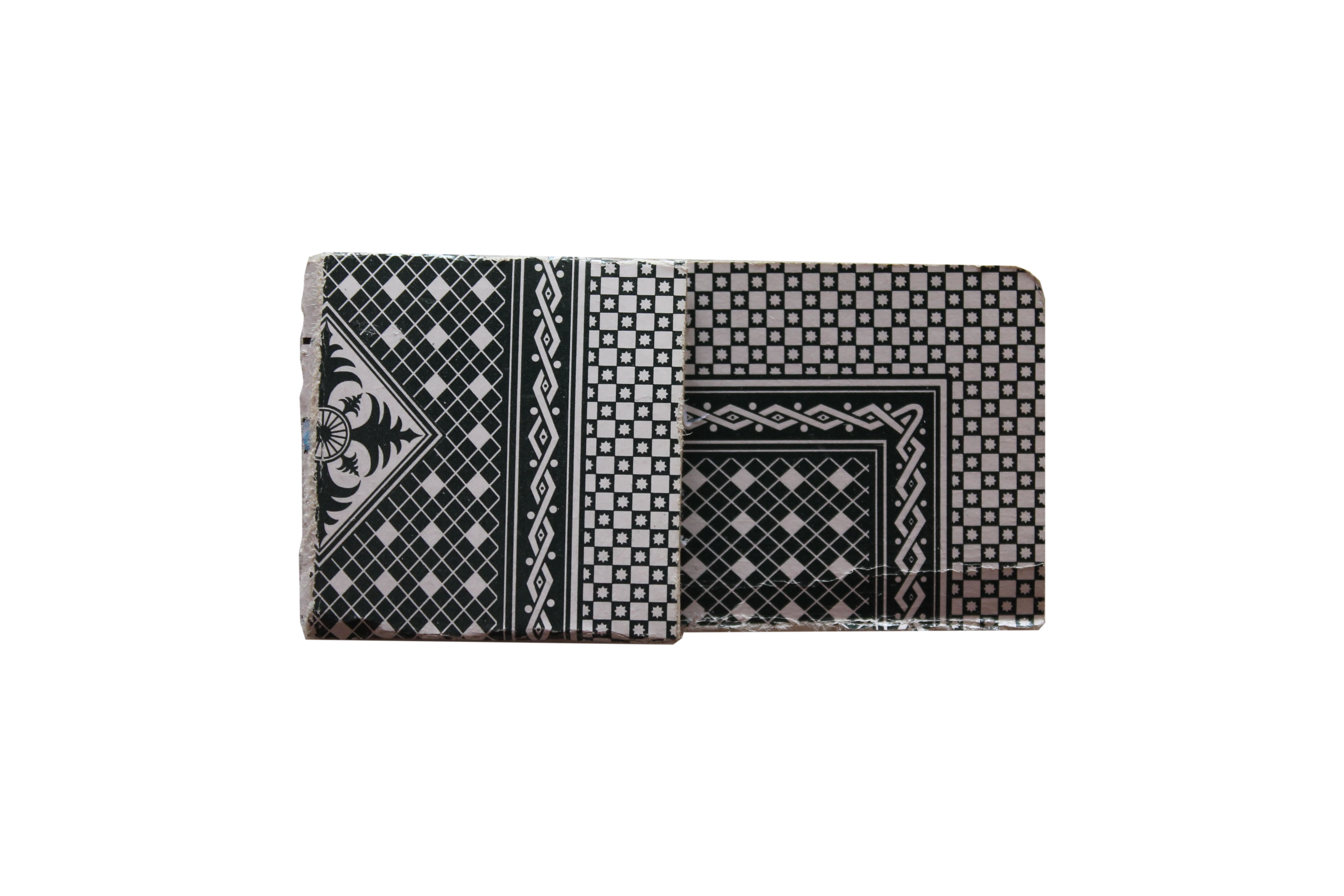
7. The horizontal part is folded into thirds as well, inserting the tab into the slot to hold it

A modern version of patacons have been distributed internationally under the name of Pogs or Tazos.

== History ==
For many years it has been one of the most representative toys of generations of grandparents in Catalunya. It has been a major toy for children until the late 1960s, as it could serve as both a toy and a currency for children, what made the patacó a game piece with a high value for children. It was often bet to get more at the risk of losing the ones you had. To build them, the boys and girls waited for the adults and especially the grandparents to throw away the already used cards from their games in the cafe. Usually when the grandparents' widely used or marked cards (for cheating) were no longer used, they gave them to the children who built their patacons. Children also collected the empty boxes of matches that the old smoking people left in the coffee tables.

== Game modes ==
There are many games modes:

1. One of the best known modes is called "picada" in which you put the patacó on the ground facing up which is called patacó base. Each player hits with his patacons on this base patacon. If they can’t turn it, they have to leave his patacon on the ground. When someone manages to turn the base patacon, they take all the patacons that are on the ground except the base patacon.
2. There is another game called "pica paret" where a line is marked on the ground a handful away from the wall. Each player has three patacons and by turn throws a patacon to bounce against the wall. If the patacon is between the wall and the line, this patacon is retained while if the patacon is beyond the line its owner recovers it. When there are patacons retained and a player throws his patacon and does not fall inside, then this player will take his patacon and all those inside retained. The game ends when the players score or when there are no more patacons left to play any of the players.
3. Another game where you can use the patacons is the game of "canut" or "tella", placing the patacons on a cylindrical surface and trying to knock down as many patacons as we put in a maximum of three throws.
4. You can also use the patacons to play the "xarranca", or "set i mig" (seven and a half). To play the game of "set i mig" it is a matter of throwing the patacon on a board of this game as many times as necessary without going beyond 7 and ½. The player may stand when he deems it appropriate as long as he does not exceed 7 and ½.

== See also ==
- Menko
- Pogs
- Tazos
