= Elma Chips =

Brazilian snacks company

- Type: Subsidiary
- Founded: 1974; 52 years ago
- Headquarters: Curitiba, Brazil
- Products: Snack food
- Parent: PepsiCo
- Website: elmachips.com
- Footnotes; Slogan: É impossível comer um só

Elma Chips is a Brazilian snacks company and its main industrial unit is in Curitiba, capital of the Brazilian state of Paraná. The company is managed by Frito-Lay, a subsidiary of the American branch of PepsiCo.

== History ==
Elma Chips was founded in 1974 when PepsiCo acquired and merged the companies American Potato Chips (located in São Paulo) and Elma Produtos Alimentícios. Elma was founded in 1958 by the sisters Elfriede Wagner and Maria Unger, and produced by hand crunchy sticks covered with coarse salt (industrialized and long version of a salted pretzel), called Stiksy and sold in green packaging. The union of the two companies was successful and the brand became known with its slogan: "It is impossible to eat just one".

The brand's first original product was Baconzitos, a bacon-flavored wheat snack which started to be sold in the company's debut year. In 1976 the company started to manufacture Cheetos in Brazil, followed by Funyuns (sold as Cebolitos to match Baconzitos) in 1978, Zambinos (a pizza-flavored corn snack) in 1982, Fandangos in 1983, and Ruffles, Doritos, Pingo d'Ouro and Ovinhos in 1986.

From 1997 the company became popular with promotions of tazos and cards as gifts in the products, based on popular franchises like Looney Tunes, Animaniacs, Pokémon, Naruto, and also originals like Dracomania and Mythomania.

In 2004 there was the debut of Sensações (lit.: Sensations), a brand of smooth potato chips targeted to a more mature audience, with more exquisite flavors. In 2006 the Lay's Stax brand started to be manufactured by Elma Chips under the name Elma Chips Stax (since Lay's was not sold in Brazil at the time). In 2010, the company acquired Lucky, known for the Fofura and Torcida snacks, thus adding more options to their portfolio. In 2013 Lay's started to be manufactured by the company. In 2021, the Sensações brand was renamed as Lay's Sensações.

== Products ==
=== Baconzitos ===
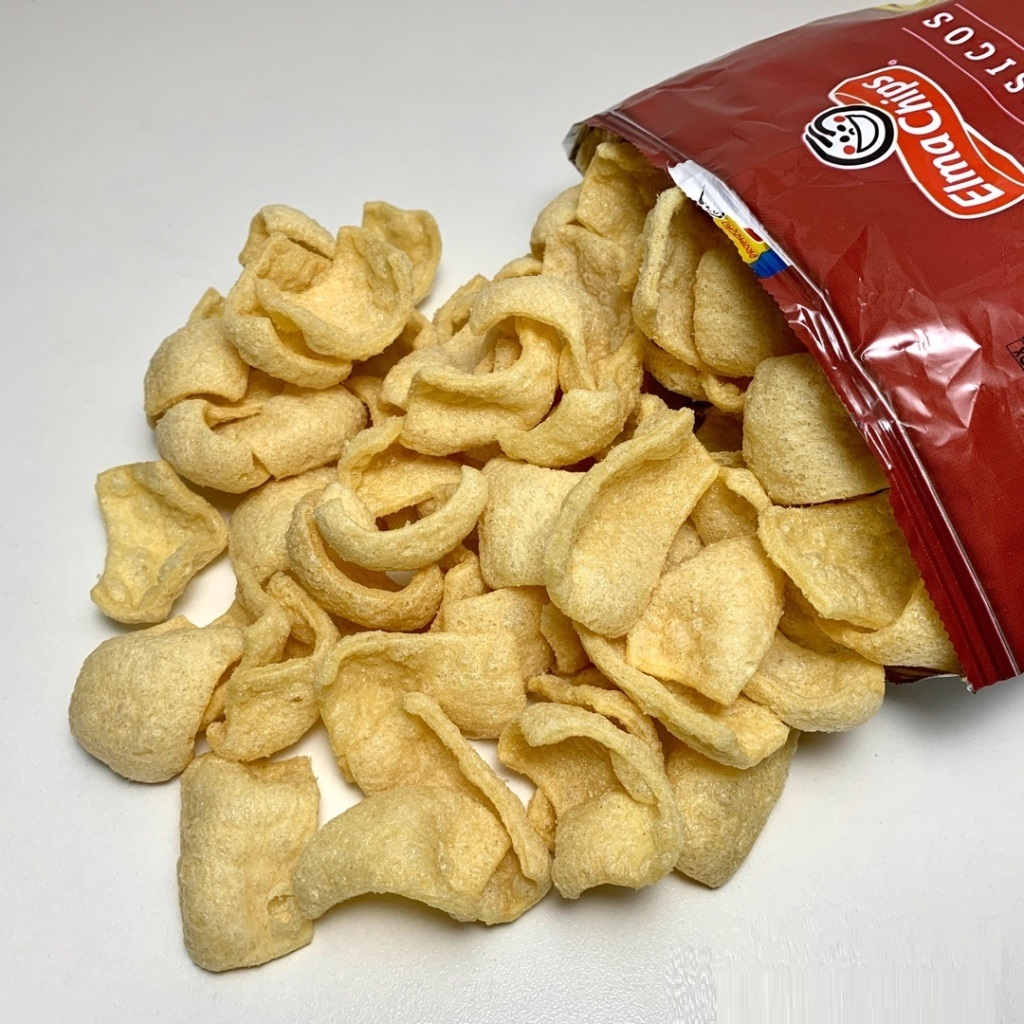
Baconzitos

Baconzitos is the brand name of a Brazilian bacon-flavored wheat snack introduced in 1974 by Elma Chips. It is known for being the first brand of the company, that before its merger was best known for the Stiksy snacks. Baconzitos is one of the main brands of Elma Chips, including being one of the longest on the market, currently being labeled as one of the top classic Elma Chips snacks, usually being known for being paired with the brand Cebolitos (Funyuns).

== See also ==
- List of brand name snack foods
- Sabritas
