= List of ¡Mucha Lucha! episodes =

Episode list for animated television series

¡Mucha Lucha! is an American animated television series created by Eddie Mort and Lili Chin. Set in the fictional Southern California town of Luchaville, a location so heavily influenced by Mexican wrestling –specifically, the wrestling style known as lucha Libre– that nearly every resident has their own mask, costume, and signature move, the series follows young adolescents Rikochet, Buena Girl, and the Flea and their studies at the Foremost World-Renowned International School of Lucha.

The series premiered on The WB's Saturday-morning cartoon block Kids' WB on August 17, 2002, and ran for 3 seasons totaling 52 episodes. The series' third season title was changed to ¡Mucha Lucha!: Gigante, which aired its final episode, on February 26, 2005. A straight-to-video movie titled ¡Mucha Lucha!: The Return of El Maléfico was released on January 4, 2005.

== Series overview ==
| Season | Episodes | Originally released | |
| Season | Episodes | First released | Last released |
|---|---|---|---|
| 1 | 13 | August 17, 2002 | February 8, 2003 |
| 2 | 26 | September 13, 2003 | January 21, 2005 |
| Film | | January 4, 2005 | |
| 3 | 13 | September 11, 2004 | February 26, 2005 |

== Episodes ==
=== Season 1 (2002–03) ===
Note: All episodes in this season are directed by Alfred Gimeno.

| No. overall | No. in season | Title | Written by | Storyboard by | Original release date |
|---|---|---|---|---|---|
| 1 | 1 | "Back to School" "Weight Gaining" | Michael Ryan | Ciro Nieli Gabe Swarr | August 17, 2002 |
Back to School: Rikochet gets into trouble at the first day of school and has to take on Potato Potata Jr. one-on-one. Weight Gaining: Rikochet has to gain weight in order to battle three students twice his size. He manages to, but his weight gets the best of him when he tries to eat a Mr. Squishy Spongecake truck and its driver. Note: "Back to School" was originally planned to be the series' pilot episode and was originally intended to be shown with "How Rikochet Got His Move Back", but ended up being paired with "Heart of Lucha" (while "Back to School" was shown with "Weight Gaining") for reasons unknown. Several episodes from this season were adapted into children's storybooks, most of them being given titles different from the episodes themselves.
| 2 | 2 | "The Fantastic Backpack" "The Naked and the Masked" | Michael Ryan Ben Townsend | Rich Chidlaw Tina Kügler | September 14, 2002 |
The Fantastic Backpack: Three bullies from the Hairy Knuckles Wrestling Academy get sucked into Rikochet's backpack. Now he, El Rey, Buena Girl, and The Flea have to get them out. The Naked and the Masked: Rikochet wakes up one morning and finds his he lost his mask, so he turns to The Flea for help.
| 3 | 3 | "How Rikochet Got His Move Back" "Heart of Lucha" | Michael Ryan | Matt Danner Dave Cunningham | August 24, 2002 |
How Rikochet Got His Move Back: Rikochet has to find his signature move or risk getting expelled from school. Heart of Lucha: The Flea accidentally hurts Snow Pea during a tag match and has to wrestle in the bad guys' classroom.
| 4 | 4 | "Woulda Coulda Hasbeena" "The Anger of Cindy Slam" | Ben Townsend | Matt Danner Ciro Nieli | August 31, 2002 |
Woulda Coulda Hasbeena: When Rikochet accidentally tears open a portal in time while wrestling Megawatt, Señor Hasbeena uses it to travel back in time to the 1970s and erase an embarrassing moment in his life, unaware of the risks of rewriting history. The Anger of Cindy Slam: The Three Mascaritas try to figure out why Cindy Slam is so angry. To earn her trust by becoming a four-way tag team, they take her to Gerbil Jorge's Happy Masked Magic World of Wrestle-Tainment amusement park.
| 5 | 5 | "Curse of the Masked Toilet" "The Mummy with the Golden Mask" | Michael Ryan Ben Townsend | Tina Kügler Dave Cunningham | September 21, 2002 |
Curse of the Masked Toilet: The Flea, Pulgita, Rikochet and Buena Girl battle a mutant masked toilet in a scary story told by The Flea. The Mummy with the Golden Mask: A mummy named Queen Voladora comes back to life to wreak her revenge and kidnaps Buena Girl after wearing a golden mask that The Flea put on, so Rikochet challenges her to a showdown at dawn.
| 6 | 6 | "Pinball Wizard" "Not So Buena Girl" | Ben Townsend Adam Beechen | Ciro Nieli Rich Chidlaw | November 30, 2002 |
Pinball Wizard: Rikochet is frozen in the shape of his pinball signature move while wrestling Sonic Sumo, and finds life more difficult until he meets a soccer player who was frozen in the shape of a soccer ball a decade ago. Not So Buena Girl: After Buena Girl receives a fortune saying she's a bad masked wrestler, it's up to Rikochet and The Flea to help her out of her misery before it's too late.
| 7 | 7 | "Bring Your Dad to Lucha Day" "Our Founder" | Mitch Watson Ben Townsend | Matt Danner Gabe Swarr | September 28, 2002 |
Bring Your Dad to Lucha Day: The dads and their children fight for the Lucha Prize. Our Founder: The last page of the Masked Code of Wrestling Book is missing and the Three Mascaritas must get it back.
| 8 | 8 | "Tooth or Dare" "Mask Mitzvah" | Ben Townsend Michael Ryan | Tina Kügler Dave Cunningham | October 26, 2002 |
Tooth or Dare: Dr. Smilytooth is missing and it's up to The Three Mascaritas to save the day. Mask Mitzvah: Rikochet takes a test to be an adult on the day he becomes a man, but it will not be easy.
| 9 | 9 | "The Flea's Fighting Fish" "La Flamencita" | Michael Ryan | Rich Chidlaw Matt Danner | November 9, 2002 |
The Flea's Fighting Fish: The Flea reunites with his pet fish, Mr. Fishy Fish, who is unhappy after being flushed down the toilet by mistake. They battle it out with Rikochet, Buena Girl, an octopus, and an electric eel taking part in the match. La Flamencita: After Rikochet accidentally injures La Flamencita's tag-team dance partner, Botas Del Fuego, during a match against French Twist, he is forced to fill in as her partner by the Headmistress and learn a special dance to help her win a Lucha dancing contest against the Ballroom Blitzkriegs, so he turns to El Rey for help.
| 10 | 10 | "Will the Real El Rey Please Stand Up?" "The Musica Man" | Ben Townsend | Ciro Nieli Gabe Swarr | November 23, 2002 |
Will the Real El Rey Please Stand Up?: Rikochet gets a chance to see the real El Rey at the Lucha Dome which upsets his El Rey action figure. The Musica Man: Rikochet beats a wrestler, but the wrestler plots revenge by giving Rikochet his very own mariachi band who constantly annoys Rikochet and gets him into trouble, so he, Buena Girl, and The Flea defeat the mariachi band.
| 11 | 11 | "Timmy of a Thousand Masks" "All Creatures Masked & Small" | Michael Ryan Ben Townsend | Ray Brown Dave Cunningham | January 25, 2003 |
Timmy of a Thousand Masks: When Buena Girl and a few other students are expelled from the school, she must prove her innocence. She eventually does when The Mascaritas capture the real culprit, Timmy Of A Thousand Masks. All Creatures Masked & Small: Masked Dog is targeted by a dog catcher which results in a Miami Vice-style chase between the dog catcher (who looks like Elvis Presley) and The Mascaritas.
| 12 | 12 | "Honor Thy Lucha" "Chinche" | Ben Townsend Jordana Arkin | Gabe Swarr Rich Chidlaw | December 14, 2002 |
Honor Thy Lucha: Rikochet discovers the consequences of stealing a rare El Rey trading card from Minotoro, courtesy of Phantasmo. Chinche: Flea's two-faced cousin Chinche wins over his friends, making Flea jealous and resulting in competition for friendship.
| 13 | 13 | "Mask-Away" | Michael Ryan and Ben Townsend | Ciro Nieli and Matt Danner | February 8, 2003 |
Rikochet and Buena Girl get stranded on an uncharted island after trying to save The Flea. Rikochet and Buena Girl both crack up, Rikochet starts talking to himself and Buena Girl thinks that the Code of Masked Wrestling is talking to her. They also both engage in a war which is resolved peacefully by The Flea. After The Flea snaps and both Rikochet and Buena Girl go insane, they all travel home by kite.

=== Season 2 (2003–05) ===
Note: From episode 14 to the end of the series, all episodes were directed by Ken Kessel.

| No. overall | No. in season | Title | Written by | Storyboard by | Original release date |
|---|---|---|---|---|---|
| 14 | 1 | "Lone Stars" "The Littlest Luchadora" | Kevin Rubio John Rozum | Gabe Swarr Dave Cunningham | October 4, 2003 |
Lone Stars: Rikochet gets mistaken for his father thanks to The Flea convincing him to pretend to be his father. Rikochet keeps the charade up until he has to face a great foe. Then Lonestar shows up on the scene. The Littlest Luchadora: After The Flea's younger sister, Pulgita, wins a match against Skelantonio, whom he couldn't beat, The Flea becomes jealous of her.
| 15 | 2 | "The Man from M.A.S.K." "Flea's Bueno Twin" | Jim Krieg | Ricky Garduno Tina Kügler | September 13, 2003 |
The Man from M.A.S.K.: Rikochet is given a secret weapon - a spy gadget that gives an advantage in unfair match-ups, as a reward. Flea's Bueno Twin: The Flea eats a foodstuff he's never seen or dared to eat before - an organic apple. After eating the apple, The Flea acts clean and even surpasses Buena Girl in the goody-two-shoes department, and drives everyone else insane.
| 16 | 3 | "Nightmare on Lucha Street" "Revenge of the Masked Toilet" | Ernie Altbacker | Ricky Garduno Ben Jones | September 20, 2003 |
Nightmare on Lucha Street: Penny Plutonium loses her mask to a wrestler named Misterioso Grande, who haunts dreams from having a nightmare, so Rikochet transports himself to the dream world to get it back from him. Revenge of the Masked Toilet: The Flea's mortal enemy, the Masked Toilet, returns to terrorize him.
| 17 | 4 | "Calling All Monsters" "Pig Out" | Ernie Altbacker | Tina Kügler Gabe Swarr | September 27, 2003 |
Calling All Monsters: Rikochet, Buena Girl, The Flea and El Gundamo battle giant sushi monsters attacking Little Tokyo. Pig Out: Rikochet finds a family of pigs living in his closet while his mother forces him to clean his room, and he must now wrestle to save his territory.
| 18 | 5 | "Thrills and Skills" "Party Animal" | Ernie Altbacker | Brian Tribble Dave Cunningham | October 18, 2003 |
Thrills and Skills: The Three Mascaritas are given extra-curricular activities as part of having a variety of experiences in their education. Rikochet plays soccer, Buena Girl plays the accordion in the band, and The Flea learns Scottish Highland games. All three of them put their skills together to help Rikochet on the playing field. Party Animal: The famous and ultra-mysterious Rey Dynamico has accepted Buena Girl's party invitation. Buena Girl decides to clean out her room and get rid of some of her old toys, including a stuffed teddy bear named Mr. Buttons, but he decides to fight back.
| 19 | 6 | "Dances with Bugs" "Chain of Fools" | Jonathan Cuba | Ron Brewer Gabe Swarr | November 1, 2003 |
Dances with Bugs: The Flea is shrunk down to the size of an insect when Penny Plutonium's shrink ray ricochets everywhere, eventually hitting him. While he is shrunk, he meets all of the bugs on the floor, and befriends a bug named Wilbur. The Flea looks after Wilbur, making sure he doesn't get crushed by Rikochet and Buena Girl, also taking down the thug bugs. Chain of Fools: Rikochet must mail out a chain letter before he ends up with years of bad luck.
| 20 | 7 | "You Look Radishing" "Lucha, Rinse, & Repeat" | Ford Riley | Tina Kügler Ricky Garduno | November 8, 2003 |
You Look Radishing: The Three Mascaritas must save the King of Radishes from the King of Turnips. Lucha, Rinse, & Repeat: Rikochet asks his friends for help when Masked Dog needs a bath.
| 21 | 8 | "War of the Donuts" "Show Me the Funny" | Peter Hastings | Perry Zombolas Dave Cunningham | November 29, 2003 |
War of the Donuts: The Flea's parents have to go somewhere for the day, and they leave The Flea in charge of their donut shop, with Rikochet and Buena Girl helping out. But when a new donut shop opens up in town, both shops try various strategies to coax customers and to get the other shop out of business. Show Me the Funny: Rikochet's Lucha partner, Coco Dementos, is a better comedian than a wrestler and therefore almost gets expelled from the School of Lucha. His father sends both of them to become Rodeos to improve on their wrestling.
| 22 | 9 | "French Twisted" "Los Lobos de Lucha" | Peter Hastings | Greg Colton Ricky Garduno | November 15, 2003 |
French Twisted: Rikochet motivates French Twist, the mime, to talk, and he does, taking the place of Rikochet in the trash talk competition against Potato Patata. But now that he is speaking, French Twist does not get to use his talents. Rikochet needs to help him, but now, he does not speak. Los Lobos de Lucha: In a match against Carlton Cold Jones, Rikochet listens to the theme song of the opponent and is defeated. Deciding he needs his own theme song, Rikochet asks Los Lobos, a popular band from the east of Los Angeles, who are also cousins of Mama, for help.
| 23 | 10 | "Getting Ahead" "Los Fabulosos" | Peter Hastings | Greg Colton and Tina Kügler Ricky Garduno | December 13, 2003 |
Getting Ahead: Rikochet wants to win a prize mask by getting his head shrunk. Los Fabulosos: Rikochet's two dim-witted uncles named Big Dipper and Little Dipper show up and cause a huge commotion.
| 24 | 11 | "Meet the Muertos" "Mask Maker" | Peter Hastings | Ricky Garduno Perry Zombolas and Ira Sherak | January 17, 2004 |
Meet the Muertos: It is the Day of the Dead and everybody has a diorama. But when Masked Dog eats Rikochet's diorama, he is asked to guide an introverted kid muerto named Calavera Muerto, who is interested in Rikochet's rented video games. When Day of the Dead is over, he won't move a muscle. He, along with Buena Girl and Flea try old-school methods, but to no avail. Mask Maker: When Rikochet sees an Antonio Mascara commercial, he is fascinated, and turns in his mask. However, Antonio Mascara is selling illegal masks.
| 25 | 12 | "Big Buena Sellout" "Laying in Ruins" | Peter Hastings | Tina Kügler Darin McGowan | January 24, 2004 |
Big Buena Sellout: When Buena Girl thinks her parents don't pay attention to her anymore, they show that they still care by making 'Buena Girl Energy Bars.' However, Buena Girl gets too snobby because of her new fortune. Laying in Ruins: It is the day of YOMAMA, a wrestling day for mothers. Rikochet loses everything due to his irresponsibility and carelessness while looking for his mother's cape, and after his mother wins, the trophy ends up being stolen by her opponent, Maya Moderna. Now, he, Buena Girl and The Flea must travel to Chichén Itzá and get the trophy back.
| 26 | 13 | "Undercover Flea" "Kid Wombat" | Peter Hastings | Darin McGowan Ben Jones | February 7, 2004 |
Undercover Flea: Three government agents hire The Flea to catch a traitor who's been selling signature moves. But what will The Flea do when the traitor turns out to be Rikochet? Kid Wombat: A new kid by the name of Kid Wombat joins the School of Lucha. At first, Rikochet and Kid Wombat get off to a good start, but when Kid Wombat dominates in the exercises, he takes Rickochet's place as the number one wrestler.
| 27 | 14 | "Churro Overload" "Mini Mercado of Doom" | Brian Swenlin John Loy | Greg Colton Tina Kügler | February 14, 2004 |
Churro Overload: The Mascaritas sell churros for a school fund-raiser. Unfortunately, The Flea keeps eating his homemade churros. Mini Mercado of Doom: Abuelito and Rikochet settle an old score with a grocer named El Abarratero.
| 28 | 15 | "La Bruja" "El Niño Loco" | Evelyn Gabai Ken Segall | Ron Brewer and Ira Sherak Ricky Garduno | February 21, 2004 |
La Bruja: A witch named La Bruja is supposedly making treats out of luchadores. El Niño Loco: The Lucha Lighthouse gang is confronted by El Niño Loco: Guardian of El Canyon Grande.
| 29 | 16 | "The Collector" | Ken Pontac | Anna Burns and Celia Kendrick | February 28, 2004 |
An evil alien named Keelspbellsvin has been collecting luchadores from across the entire galaxy and kidnaps all of the masked wrestlers (including the teachers) at Rikochet's school. Now it is up to The Flea, Rikochet, and Buena Girl to save their school and stop the collector for good, before it's too late.
| 30 | 17 | "The Brat in the Hat" "Election Daze" | Ernie Altbacker Earl Kress | Greg Colton and Ricky Garduno Tina Kügler | March 13, 2004 |
The Brat in the Hat: Rikochet gets a new outfit that controls him and wants revenge on Los Pantalones Elegantes, the judge of the Fashion Inspection Show at the School of Lucha, who originally wore the outfit during his childhood. Buena Girl and The Flea must get the outfit off of Rikochet. Election Daze: Buena Girl, The Flea, and Snow Pea are running for school president. Buena Girl promises good things, The Flea promises chewy shoes and butter snacks, and Snow Pea promises "Snow Pea!" Meanwhile, Tibor the Terrible, El Loco Mosquito, and El Perrito try to take over the Student Council.
| 31 | 18 | "Late Night Lucha" "Flea at Last" | Scott M. Gimple Peter Gaffney | Gabe Swarr Ira Sherak | April 3, 2004 |
Late Night Lucha: El Rey wrestles a toy robot dinosaur called El Ultra Mecha Destructo Grande Go and loses his parts. Flea at Last: After losing another match, The Flea risks being expelled from school forever if he doesn't win one. So he asks Rikochet for help to win.
| 32 | 19 | "Flea's Personal Demons" "Virtual Luchadores" | Peter Hastings Scott M. Gimple | Celia Kendrick and Tina Kügler Ricky Garduno | April 17, 2004 |
Flea's Personal Demons: The Flea gets two personal demons to do his bidding. Virtual Luchadores: Rikochet becomes addicted to an online game.
| 33 | 20 | "Day of the Piñata" "Poocha Lucha" | Peter Hastings Michael Prescott | Greg Colton Anna Burns and Ron Brewer | April 24, 2004 |
Day of the Piñata: A giant piñata of General Ignacio Zaragoza comes to life and rampages in the city during Cinco De Mayo, after Flea ate the candy inside him. The students must refill him before it's too late. Poocha Lucha: Masked Dog is stolen, and Rikochet and El Rey go to find him using Masked Dog's mask, which was removed by Rescue Granny who has connections with the Hairy Knuckles Brutos. Rikochet ends up having to fight for Masked Dog's ownership with Heavy Traffic of the Hairy Knuckles Academy.
| 34 | 21 | "Run, Lucha, Run" "An Epic Tale of Donuts and Heroes" | Mitch Watson | Ira Sherak and Tina Kügler Darin McGowan | May 1, 2004 |
Run, Lucha, Run: Rikochet, Buena Girl, The Flea and Pulgita must go by foot to see the big match. An Epic Tale of Donuts and Heroes: Everyone climbs the Frosted Mountain to get the donut batter flowing again.
| 35 | 22 | "Attack of the Luchabots!" | Peter Hastings | Ricky Garduno and Greg Colton | May 8, 2004 |
The school science fair turns into a nightmare when one of the science projects, the Luchabot, starts giving everyone an F. Later on, the Luchabot starts to replace all of the students and teachers with robots.
| 36 | 23 | "My Hairy Knuckles" "Brains Meets Brawn" | Mitch Watson Scott M. Gimple | Anna Burns Celia Kendrick | December 4, 2004 |
My Hairy Knuckles: Buena Girl makes Heavy Traffic into a new luchador, Union Jack. Brains Meets Brawn: A mix-up takes place between the Lucha School and the Evil School. The evil guy at the Lucha School, Maestro del Mundo, defeats every wrestler, including the Headmistress.
| 37 | 24 | "Asphalt of Doom" "Hot, Hot, Hot" | Mitch Watson Peter Hastings | Darin McGowan Tina Kügler and Ira Sherak | January 21, 2005 |
Asphalt of Doom: The Luchadores and Prima Donna Hodges' crew enter a derby for some fabulous prizes and a chance for their pictures on a poster. Hot, Hot, Hot: It is the hottest day of the year and Igloca has stolen all the ice. It's up to Rikochet, Pierre del Fuego, and Zero Kelvin to get the ice back. Unfortunately, Pierre del Fuego and Zero Kelvin can't stop arguing with each other.
| 38 | 25 | "I Was a Pre-Teenage Chupacabra" "Carnival of Masked Terror" | Mitch Watson | Ricky Garduno Greg Colton | November 27, 2004 |
I Was a Pre-Teenage Chupacabra: A new hair product is in store, The Flea puts on too much of it, and everyone thinks he's the chupacabra. Carnival of Masked Terror: Minotoro defeats a champion wrestler, whose mother put a gypsy curse on him.
| 39 | 26 | "Getting His Goat" "10 Rounds of Trouble" | Peter Hastings Mitch Watson | Tina Kügler Ron Brewer | January 21, 2005 |
Getting His Goat: Rikochet and his Abuelito travel to a small town where Abuelito is being honored. Rikochet is tempered by a goat and he ends up trading places with him. Rikochet must get back into his own skin before he has to introduce Abuelito to the town. 10 Rounds of Trouble: The Luchadores must save Snow Pea from the Hairy Knuckles Academy in ten minutes before he's unmasked in front of the crowd.

=== Direct-to-video film (2005) ===
| Title | Directed by | Written by | Storyboard by | Original release date |
|---|---|---|---|---|
| ¡Mucha Lucha!: The Return of El Maléfico | Ron Hughart | Michael Ryan & Ben Townsend | Alan Caldwell, Ray Claffey, Darin McGowan, Kyle Menke, Rafael L. Navarro, & Charles Visser | January 4, 2005 (Video release) |
The world of Lucha Libre is threatened when a dark force named El Maléfico is accidentally released. The Three Mascaritas, Rikochet, Buena Girl, and The Flea must rise to the challenge and send the evil force from whence it came. Their battle with El Maléfico will decide the fate of the universe.

=== ¡Mucha Lucha!: Gigante, Season 3 (2004–05) ===
Note: The theme song from Chicos de Barrio was changed in this season.

| No. overall | No. in season | Title | Written by | Storyboard by | Original release date |
|---|---|---|---|---|---|
| 40 | 1 | "Buena Basura" "Shamrock 'n Roll" | Story by : Eddie Mort | Greg Colton Ricky Garduno | September 11, 2004 |
Buena Basura: The Flea wins a special wrestling match called the Grand Garbage Grapple for three consecutive years, but this time, Buena Girl must take The Flea's place. Shamrock 'n Roll: Rick O'Shea, a leprechaun with a name resembling Rikochet's, secretly ruins Rikochet's reputation by making it look as if Rikochet is doing bad things.
| 41 | 2 | "The Spider and the Flea" "The Incredible Penny Plutonium" | Story by : Eddie Mort; Written by : Tom Sheppard Tom Sheppard | Gabe Swarr Darin McGowan | September 18, 2004 |
The Spider and the Flea: The episode starts with a fight for the Most Dominant Species belt between Los Maniferos and Los Insectos. Los Insectos wins and gets the belt, but it is suddenly taken away by the Black Widower. Black Widower takes the belt and threatens to take their masks too. The Flea, El Loco Mosquito, and Dragonfly have to get back the belt or risk being expelled by the Headmistress, while Rikochet and Buena Girl keep her busy. In the end, they get the belt back and discover the Black Widower was actually The Defeated Wrestlers. The Incredible Penny Plutonium: Penny is sick of being just smart and not strong, and thinks she will never win a fight. The Flea suggests she should make a formula in her dad's laboratory that will make her extra smart and strong. While in the laboratory, The Flea bumps into a shelf with dangerous potions on it. The chemicals touch Penny and she turns into a huge and powerful monster. The Flea, Rikochet, and Buena Girl go into her head and help her win the fight. Penny uses her brain power to defeat the monster.
| 42 | 3 | "Dare to Lucha" "Monkey Business" | Story by : Eddie Mort; Written by : Tom Sheppard Story by : Eddie Mort and Ron Brewer; Written by : Tom Sheppard | Greg Colton Tim Parsons | September 25, 2004 |
Dare to Lucha: The episode starts with a match up between Perro Salvaje and Rat Man. Perro and Rat Man go back and forth with dares, and the match starts. Rat Man takes the win. Afterwards, Cindy Slam talks trash about Rikochet, and they dare each other to a Lucha match, imitating a show that they just watched, called Dare to Lucha. The match is held in mid-air with piranhas, man-eating clowns, and more. The cage floor opens, and they almost fall to their deaths. Later on, they end up on a giant octopus and almost fall in the water. While tangled in the octopus's tentacles, Cindy apologizes and they tag team the octopus. After a fierce fight, Cindy and Rikochet win. Monkey Business: The episode starts out with a gorilla fight. Afterwards, The Flea thinks he could beat the gorillas in a match. A zoo employee mistakes Flea for a monkey and tries to capture him, and as a result, he ends up in the gorilla's cage. The gorillas don't take kindly to him invading, and try to attack. The Flea tries to escape and calm them down. The gorillas then think he's their king and make him King of the Monkeys. Rikochet and Buena Girl try to get The Flea out of the gorilla's cage by challenging him to a match. After a long battle, Buena Girl wins and becomes Monkey Queen, but then they all get kicked out of the gorilla cage.
| 43 | 4 | "Dawn of the... Donuts" "Yo Ho Ho and a Bottle of Horchata" | Tom Sheppard Story by : Tim Yoon; Written by : Tom Sheppard | Ricky Garduno Bob Bowen, Ron Brewer, and Ricky Garduno | October 2, 2004 |
Dawn of the... Donuts: The Flea forgets to wash his hands before making donuts and (by forgetting it) he makes a donut that comes alive, so he calls him "Sprinkles." One day, he tries to eat Sprinkles, so Sprinkles tries to escape and revive all the donuts. Rikochet and Buena Girl get tied in donuts and The Flea frees them. Finally, Flea tells Sprinkles that he is sorry, and it appears that The Flea eats Sprinkles completely at the end. Yo Ho Ho and a Bottle of Horchata: The Flea wants to buy a stinkbug and he tries to find his piggy bank to buy it, but he finds out that a pirate crew, led by Captain Long John Black Hook Pegbeard, stole his piggy bank. Rikochet, Buena Girl, and Tibor the Terrible help The Flea to get his piggy bank back.
| 44 | 5 | "Medico Mayhem" "Big Worm" | Tom Sheppard | Greg Colton Gabe Swarr | November 6, 2004 |
Medico Mayhem: After The Flea fakes an injury in his spleen, he must go to the hospital where an evil doctor plans to pull out his aching spleen with his 'Luchamonster.' The Flea must stop him with the help of his organs. Big Worm: Mr. Flea is on his annual fishing trip and The Mascaritas join him. It turns out 'one' got away, but rather than a fish, it's a giant worm named Gordo Gus. Mr. Flea tries to get his belt back from within him.
| 45 | 6 | "Banditos de los Muertos" "Field of Screams" | Story by : Eddie Mort; Written by : Tom Sheppard Tom Sheppard | Lane Lueras Darin McGowan | October 30, 2004 |
Banditos de los Muertos: The Flea upsets the Banditos de los Muertos and is caught in the realm of the dead. Field of Screams: Mysterioso Grande returns to haunt the Luchadores again, but this time, in the real world.
| 46 | 7 | "Slamazon and On..." "Buena on Wheels" | Tom Sheppard Julie McNally Cahill & Timothy Cahill | Tim Parsons Ricky Garduno | November 13, 2004 |
Slamazon and On...: Buena Girl goes back to her Slamazonian roots and is chosen to be queen. She enjoys being queen, until she finds out that every 100 years the Slamazon Queen is sacrificed to the Volcano God. Buena on Wheels: There's a new superstar at Rollerlucha named Rollerita. Rikochet and The Flea think it's Buena Girl in disguise.
| 47 | 8 | "A Whole Lotta El Reys" "Doomien" | Tom Sheppard | Greg Colton Gabe Swarr | November 20, 2004 |
A Whole Lotta El Reys: The Flea wants an El Rey action figure of his own. So, Rikochet makes an El Rey action figure for The Flea, which, unfortunately, wants to be with Ricochet. The El Rey figure creates more copies, and Ricochet must battle them, even if it involves ruining his favorite chili. Doomien: After winning a tag team match, Rikochet and Buena Girl get into a huge argument and split up. Rikochet tag teams with Snow Pea and Buena Girl tag teams with a new kid named Doomien, who is not what he seems - he is actually a creepy luchador with connections to the underworld.
| 48 | 9 | "The Match Before Xmas" | Ray DeLaurentis | Ricky Garduno and Tim Parsons | December 11, 2004 |
Rudo Claus, Santo Claus' evil twin brother, and his team of chupacabras try to take over Christmas by only giving gifts to those who have been bad. Only Buena Girl is left to rescue Santo Claus with a pink eye she got from a pink-eyed chupacabra that works for Rudo Claus.
| 49 | 10 | "Call of the Mild" | Tom Sheppard | Lane Lueras and Ron Brewer | February 5, 2005 |
Call of the Mild: Rikochet, Buena Girl, Flea, Megawatt and Francisco of the Forest face off against Irgwin and his evil genius buddies in a camp race while evading the Lost Luchadores, a bunch of young campers who have got lost and mutated into half-plant, half-wrestler beings.
| 50 | 11 | "Smarticus" "Niko Sushi's Happy Battle Funtime Dome 3000!" | Julie McNally Cahill & Timothy Cahill Story by : Gabe Swarr; Written by : Brian Swenlin | Eddie Mort, Ron Brewer, and Sean Pendergrass Gabe Swarr | February 12, 2005 |
Smarticus: Rikochet tries to become a gladiator at a gladiator-themed arena. Niko Sushi's Happy Battle Funtime Dome 3000!: Double Ninja Ninja, El Gundamo, Sonic Sumo, and The Flea compete on Niko Sushi's Happy Funtime Dome, a game show that no one has ever won.
| 51 | 12 | "Mars Madness" "Fears of a Clown" | Tom Sheppard | Ricky Garduno Lane Lueras | February 19, 2005 |
Mars Madness: The Luchadores travel to Mars in a pyramid and discover that the Pathfinder and a creature are acting up. Fears of a Clown: Coco Demento the Clown goes to the circus. He is both sad and scared as he is reunited with his former clown crew, who had destroyed an orphanage with a custard pie.
| 52 | 13 | "The Magnificent Three (Series Finale)" | Julie McNally Cahill & Timothy Cahill | Ricky Garduno, Eddie Mort, Sean Pendergrass, and Vic Balchele | February 26, 2005 |
Rikochet, Buena Girl, and The Flea must rescue Blue Demon Jr. from a group of vampires who plan to be at large during the solar eclipse.
