= Fandangos (snack) =

Puffcorn snack brand

- The current Fandangos logo, used since 2008
- Product type: Puffcorn
- Current owner: PepsiCo (via Elma Chips)
- Country: Brazil
- Introduced: 1983
- Markets: Brazil
- Website: Fandangos' Website

Fandangos is a brand of puffcorn snack made by Elma Chips, Brazilian representative of Frito-Lay and a subsidiary of PepsiCo. The snack was introduced in 1983, in corn flavor, as a shell-shaped parallel to Cheetos. It shortly became almost as popular as Cheetos with the Brazilian public. Over time, other flavors, like cheese and ham, were introduced.

In 2017, a version of the brand made with whole flour was sold.

The brand's mascot is a scarecrow called Spiguy, introduced in 1993, one year before the introduction of Chester Cheetah in Brazil.

Until 2005, Spiguy was drawn more like a traditional scarecrow, wearing a straw hat. From then on, a more "teenage" look was adopted, featuring a green baseball cap.

Some materials spell the character's name as Spiggy.

== Flavors ==
Fandangos is better known in two traditional flavors: cheese and ham. However, the snack has also been made in several limited-time flavors, such as: steak, pizza, barbecue, corn, Fandangos Pipoca (Portuguese for Popcorn Fandangos) in butter and barbecue flavors and Fandoce, a sweet version, in chocolate and churro flavors.
