= Stiksy =

Wheat snack brand

- Product type: Wheat snack
- Current owner: PepsiCo (via Elma Chips)
- Country: Brazil
- Introduced: 1959; 67 years ago
- Markets: Brazil
- Website: Stiksy's Website

Stiksy is a wheat snack brand made by Elma Chips, Brazilian representative of Frito-Lay and a subsidiary of PepsiCo.

The snack consists of crunchy sticks made of wheat and covered with salt. It was originally created in 1959 independently by the German immigrant families Wagner and Unger in Curitiba, inspired by pretzels. Later in 1962, with the foundation of Elma Bakery (founded by sisters Elfriede Wagner and Maria Unger, which would later become Elma Chips), the snacks began to be produced on a larger scale. Stiksy continued to be sold by Elma even after Pepsico's purchase of the company in 1974 and its merger with the recent American Potato Chips company, starting to be sold all over the country around 1976.

Currently Stiksy is labeled as one of the top classic snacks sold by Elma Chips.
