= Twistees =

Brand of Maltese snacks

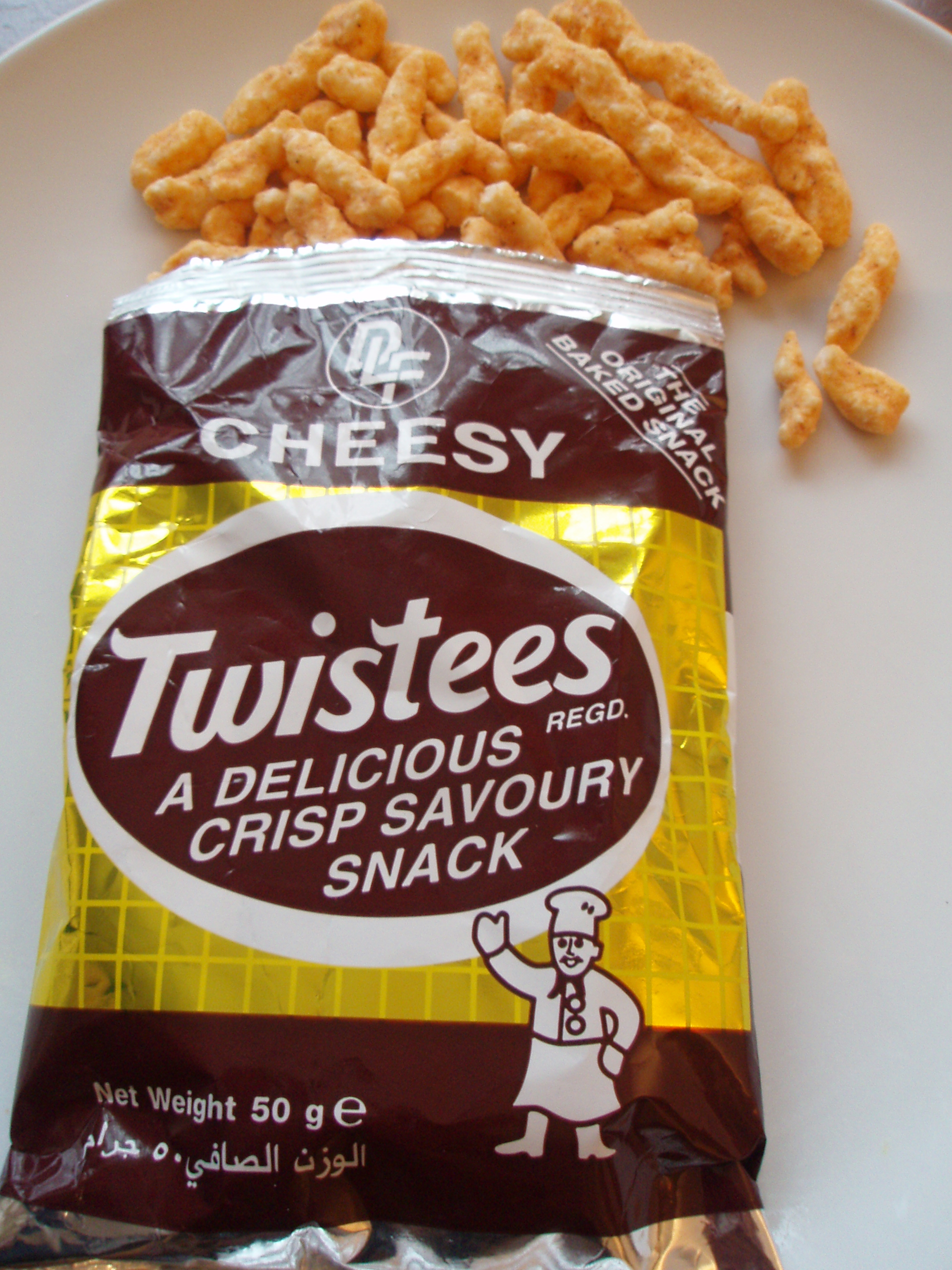
A packet of Twistees

Twistees is a brand of Maltese snacks which is now widely exported. Twistees are produced by Tastees Manufacturing Limited at a factory in Marsa which was originally established by Ray Calleja in 1969. The most popular snack food in Malta, they are also exported to the Middle East and Germany. Twistees are a rice-based snack manufactured by a baking process. The most popular form of the snack are the original Cheesy Twistees, though other flavours have been added to the range over the years, including Twistees Smokey Barbeque, Twistees Lite, Twistees Chicken, Twistees Sour Cream and Onion and Twistees Blue Cheese and Twistees Paprika. The Twistees Sharing packet comes in a 150g size bag, compared to the standard 50g size packet. Tastees are variant, bacon-flavoured Twistees. Twistees celebrated its 50-year anniversary in 2019.
