= Sabritas =

Mexican snacks company

Sabritas, S. de R.L. de C.V.
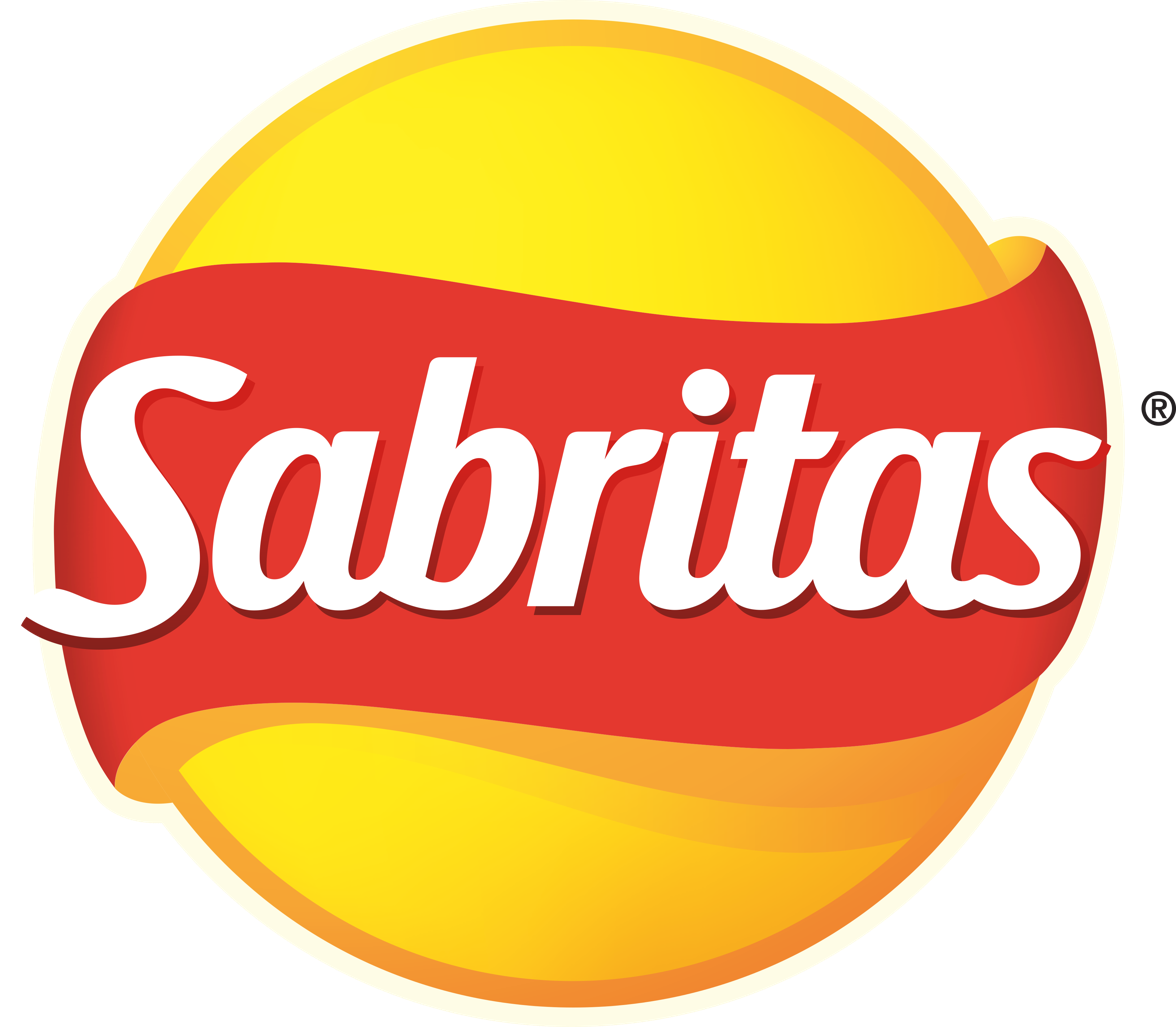
- Type: Subsidiary of PepsiCo
- Founded: 1943; 83 years ago
- Headquarters: Mexico City, Mexico
- Products: Snack food
- Parent: PepsiCo
- Website: www.sabritas.com.mx
- Footnotes; Slogan: A que no puedes comer sólo una, Te quiere ver sonreír, La vida necesita sabor and 75 Años en las Manos de México. (current)

Sabritas, S. de R.L. de C.V. is a Mexican snack company owned by PepsiCo. They are best known for manufacturing potato chips. Sabritas is the Mexican name of Lay's, similar to Margarita in Colombia or Walkers in the United Kingdom and Ireland.

== History ==
Sabritas was founded in 1943 by Pedro Antonio Marcos Noriega as Golosinas y Productos Selectos in Mexico City. It produced and sold potato chips, corn chips and snacks, and relied on a small distribution network which was mostly bicycle-based. The name is a portmanteau of Sabrosas y Fritas, which means Tasty and Fried (or Fried ones) in Spanish.

In 1966, a year after Frito-Lay and Pepsi-Cola Company merged to form Pepsico, Sabritas was bought out. It started modernizing its processes and expanding its retail channel.

In 2000, Sabritas made taco shells that inadvertently contained Starlink, a genetically modified corn that was not approved for human consumption. The contaminated flour was supplied by a mill in Texas. The shells were made on behalf of Kraft, which distributed them in Taco Bell-branded packages to supermarkets; Kraft recalled the taco shells when the Starlink was detected by Friends of the Earth.

== Present day ==
Sabritas is the brand under which PepsiCo brands the Frito-Lay products in Mexico, such as Cheetos, Fritos, Doritos and Ruffles. It is also the namesake for its own line of potato chips. Frito-Lay also sells variations of its products under the Lays brand in the United States. Some seasons, every bag of Sabritas contains non-wrapped plastic and Tazos. Tazos are known as POGS in the U.S. It also has several local products such as Crujitos, Poffets, Rancheritos and Sabritones. Sabritas controls around 80% of the Mexican snacks market, while the company's main competitor, Grupo Bimbo's Barcel has 12% of it.

== Alegro Internacional ==
In 1982, in the middle of the Latin American debt crisis it created Sonric's as a way to expand its product line with candies and as a response to lowered demand because of the contraction of economic power.

The brand is known because of its mascot, a wizard (known as El Maguito Sonrics) and it is popular among kids.

The brand was so successful that it later expanded to other markets that did not fit well in Sonric's' such as dry powder mixes and flavored water, so it was decided to create Alegro Internacional, a new division of Pepsico to fit these.

== See also ==
- List of brand name snack foods
- Elma Chips

== Links ==
Sabritas homepage (in Spanish)
