= Milk caps (game) =

Children's game

Milk caps is a children’s game played with small flat circular discs, originally the cardboard caps from milk bottles. Players make a stack of these caps, and take turns to drop a heavier "slammer" object onto it, causing the stack to be disrupted.

Each player keeps any face-up caps and is to restack the face-down caps, repeating the process until none land face-down, at which point the player who collected the most caps wins the game.

The game is also known as Pogs, under which name it was sold commercially in the 1990s. The name originates from POG, a brand of juice made from passionfruit, orange, and guava; the use of the juice's caps to play the game preceded the game's commercialization.

== History ==
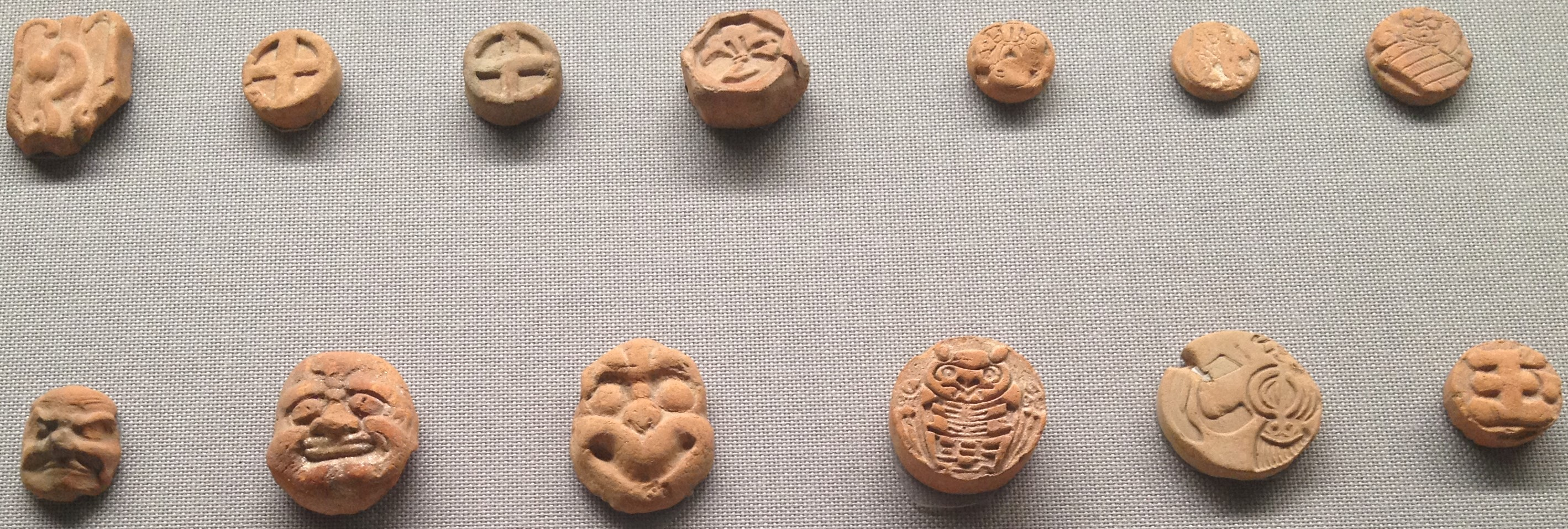
Men'uchi from the Edo period were made from clay. They were converted into paper format (menko) during the Meiji period.

The game of milk caps possibly originated in Maui, Hawaii, during the 1920s or 1930s; it may also have origins in Menko, a Japanese card game very similar to milk caps, which has been in existence since the 17th century, during the Edo period. The game of milk caps was played on the Hawaiian island of Maui as early as 1927. There are cap collectors that have caps dating back to the 1940s and 1950s.

After new packaging made cardboard milk caps obsolete in the 1950s, manufacturers such as Haleakala Dairy and Orchards Hawaii occasionally distributed the caps as promotional items. When Haleakala used the caps to successfully promote the 1971 introduction of their fruit drink Pog, it led to a surge in similar promotions and milk cap collecting. In 1991, Haleakala expanded to the more populated Oʻahu island, which led to a revival of the game. With this revival, the Pog name began being used generically for the game.

The 1990s revival is credited to Blossom Galbiso, a teacher and guidance counselor who taught at Waialua Elementary School in Oʻahu. In 1991, Galbiso introduced the game she had played as a girl to a new generation of students, incorporating milk caps into her fifth grade curriculum as a way of teaching math and as a non-violent alternative to other popular schoolyard games, such as dodgeball. The game spread from Oʻahu's North Shore, and by early 1992, Stanpac Inc., a Canadian packaging company that had been manufacturing the milk caps distributed by Haleakala Dairy on Maui (the same caps that were collected by Galbiso for her class), was printing millions of milk caps every week for shipment to the Hawaiian island chain. The game spread to the mainland, first surfacing in California, Texas, Oregon, and Washington before spreading to the rest of the country. By 1993, the previously obscure game of milk caps, which had almost been forgotten, was played throughout the world.

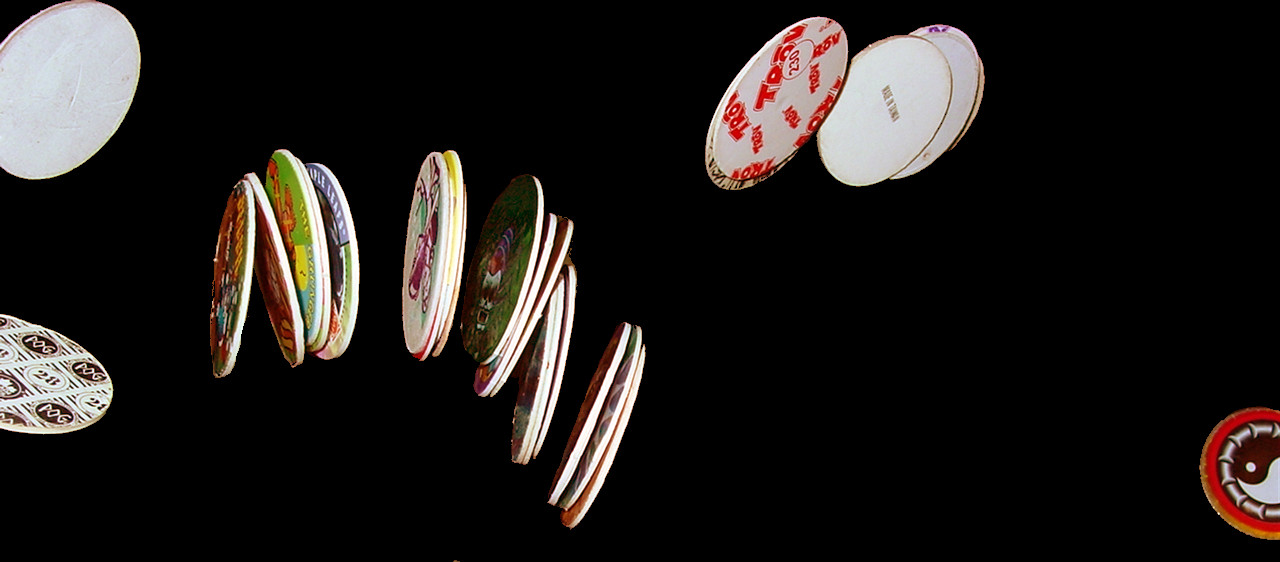
Real milk caps had small staples in them which, when stacked, produced a random element to the game. Regular milk caps were used to throw at the stack and were able to flip the pile.

Milk caps returned to popularity when the World Pog Federation and the Canada Games Company reintroduced them under the Pog brand name in the 1990s. The Pog fad soared, and peaked in the mid-1990s. Pogs were being handed out for opening bank accounts and in McDonald's Happy Meals. With the end of the Pogs fad, Canada Games went out of business in 1997.

Seven other companies entered the milk cap field after a comic book and card industry convention in January 1993. SkyBox International and Marvel added the product to their lines under the names SkyCaps and Hero Caps respectively. The game had spread to California, Florida and Texas.

The term Pog was claimed as trademark by the World Pog Federation while other companies claimed it was a generic term as it was selected by the children that played the game. In October 1994, a lawsuit was settled between World Pog and Universal Pogs Association. Pog was recognized as World Pog's exclusive term and Universal Pogs changed its name to Universal Slammers, Inc.

Because many children would keep the milk caps they won in games from other players, many school districts considered milk caps a form of gambling. Milk caps proved to be major distractions from classes and the source of various playground arguments. These elements eventually led to the banning of milk caps from various schools across North America. Other bannings occurred across Australia and Sweden.

== Equipment ==
Milk caps generally involves two types of playing discs: milk caps and slammers. Milk caps are typically flat circular cardboard discs which are decorated with images on one or both sides. Traditional (or traditional-style) milk caps are made of rougher cardboard, are printed with limited colors, and often have a staple in them (as they appeared when used as actual POG bottlecaps), while modern commercial pogs were stiffer, thicker and are often printed with colorful glossy imagery.

The other equipment that is used is a slammer: a heavier game piece often made of metal, rubber, or more commonly plastic, which come in various thicknesses and weights. They are typically similar in diameter to milk caps. Metal slammers are not allowed in some games because they are usually heavier than other materials, giving the player with the first turn an unfair advantage, and have a tendency to damage the milk caps.

== Gameplay ==
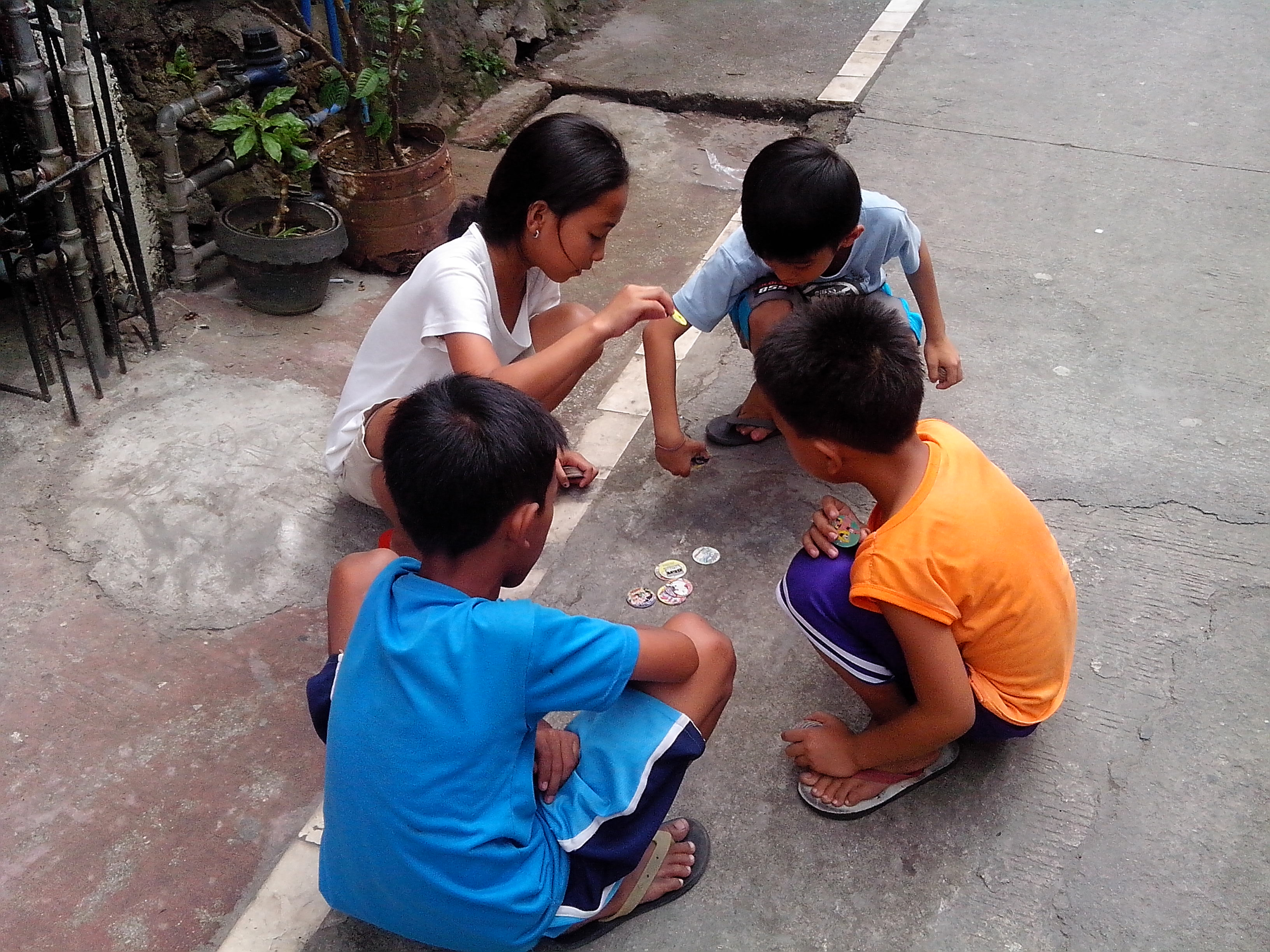
Children in the Philippines playing pogs.

Rules vary among players, but the game variants generally have common gameplay features. Each player has their own collection of milk caps and one or more slammers. Before the game, players decide whether to play "for keeps", i.e. players get to keep the milk caps that they win during the game and must forfeit those that have been won by other players. The game can then begin as follows:

1. The players each contribute an equal number of milk caps to build a stack, which will be used during the game.
2. The players take turns throwing their slammer down onto the top of the stack, causing it to spring up and the milk caps to scatter. Each player keeps any milk caps that have flipped over.
3. After each throw, the milk caps which have not flipped over are then re-stacked for the next player.
4. When no milk caps remain in the stack, the player with the most pogs is the winner.
5. Rules can be changed depending on who is playing, and where they are from.

Philippine variation

In the Philippines, they use a pog, not a slammer, to slam the Pogs.

== World POG Federation ==
The World POG Federation was the licensed POG publisher, which was 14% owned by Haleakala Dairy, the trademark holder of POGs. The company was based in Costa Mesa, California.

== Global variants ==
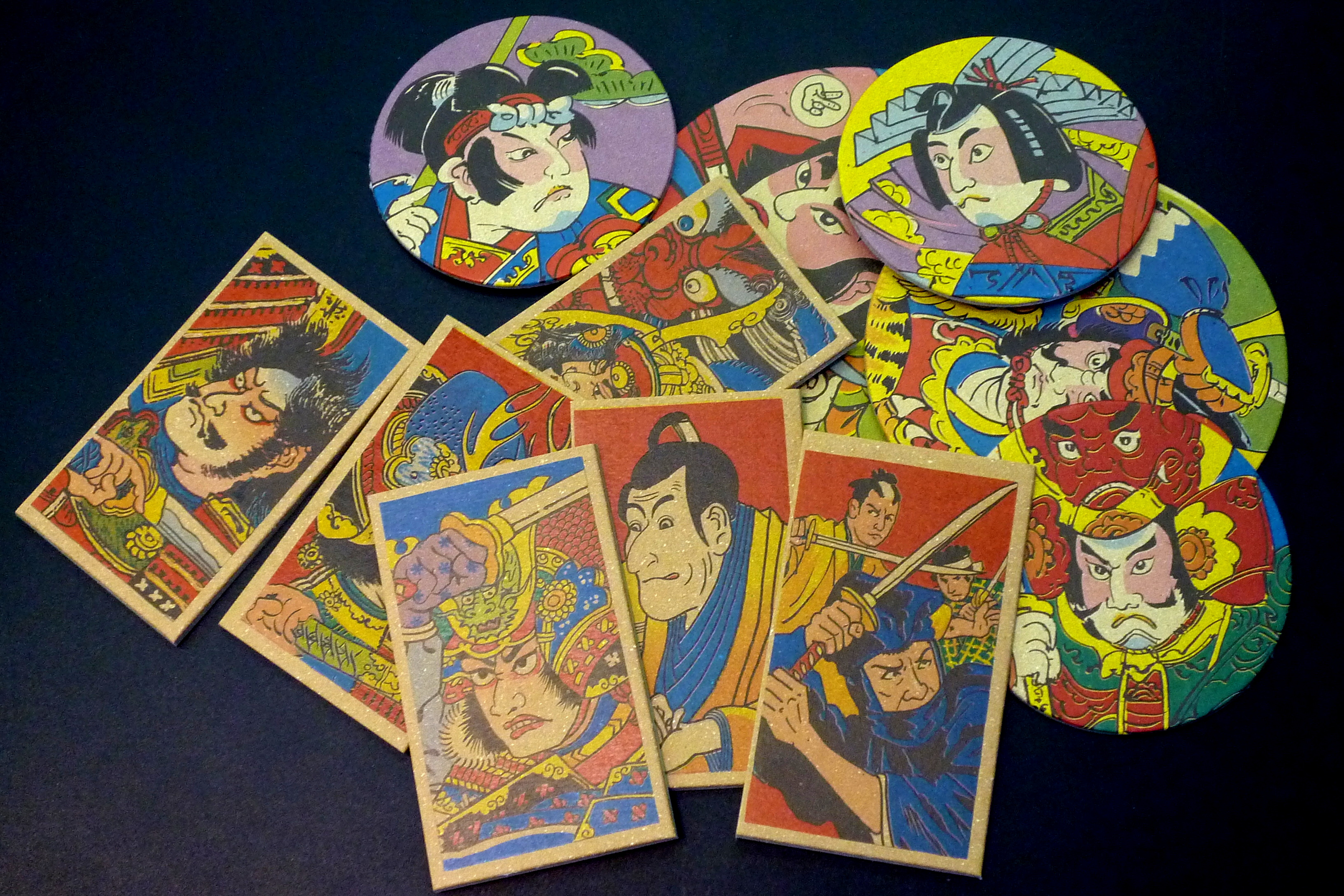
A collection of Menko cards.

=== Japan ===
Menko (めんこ, 面子) is a Japanese card game played by two or more players, dating back to the 17th century. Each player uses Menko cards made from thick paper or cardboard, printed on one or both sides with images from anime, manga, and other works.

=== South Korea ===
Ddakji or Ttakji is a South Korean game played by two or more players.

=== China ===
It is known in China as wáah pín (Pinyin: huà piàn, Chinese: 畫片) (also called yang pian in northern China) and is printed on rectangular or circular cards.

=== Philippines ===
A similar game in the Philippines played by children is known as teks. It involves small collectible cards, originally of popular actors, and then later on of popular comics and cartoon characters. It dates back to the 1930s and involves flipping cards with a thumb and forefinger. The winner is whichever card lands face up. The loser has to give one of his collectible cards to the winner.

=== Catalonia ===
Patacó is a traditional card game played by children in Catalonia in which the patacons are turned upside down, hit with the palm of the hand and, if they turn around, they win.

They are made with wasted Spanish playing cards.

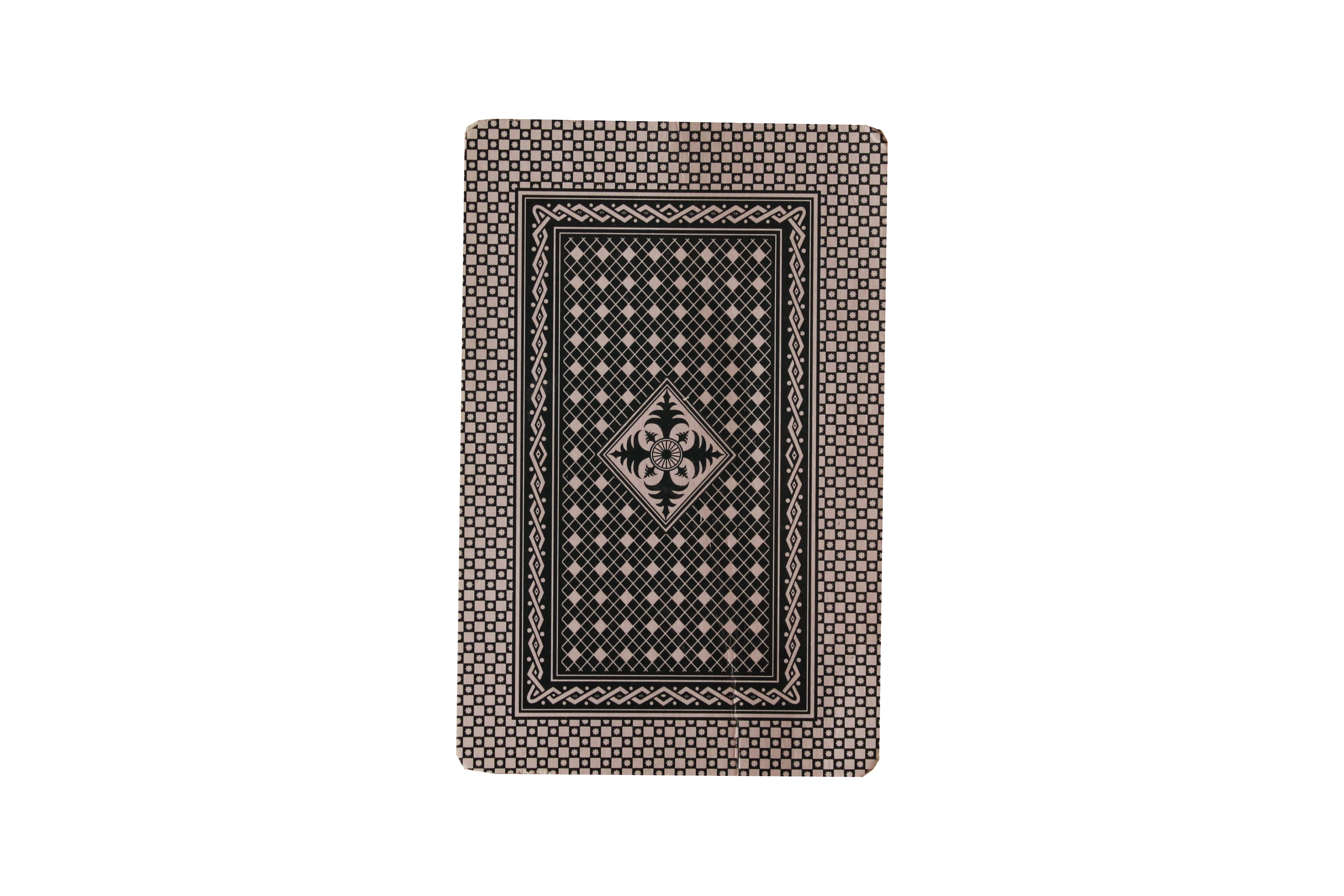
1. Spanish card back view

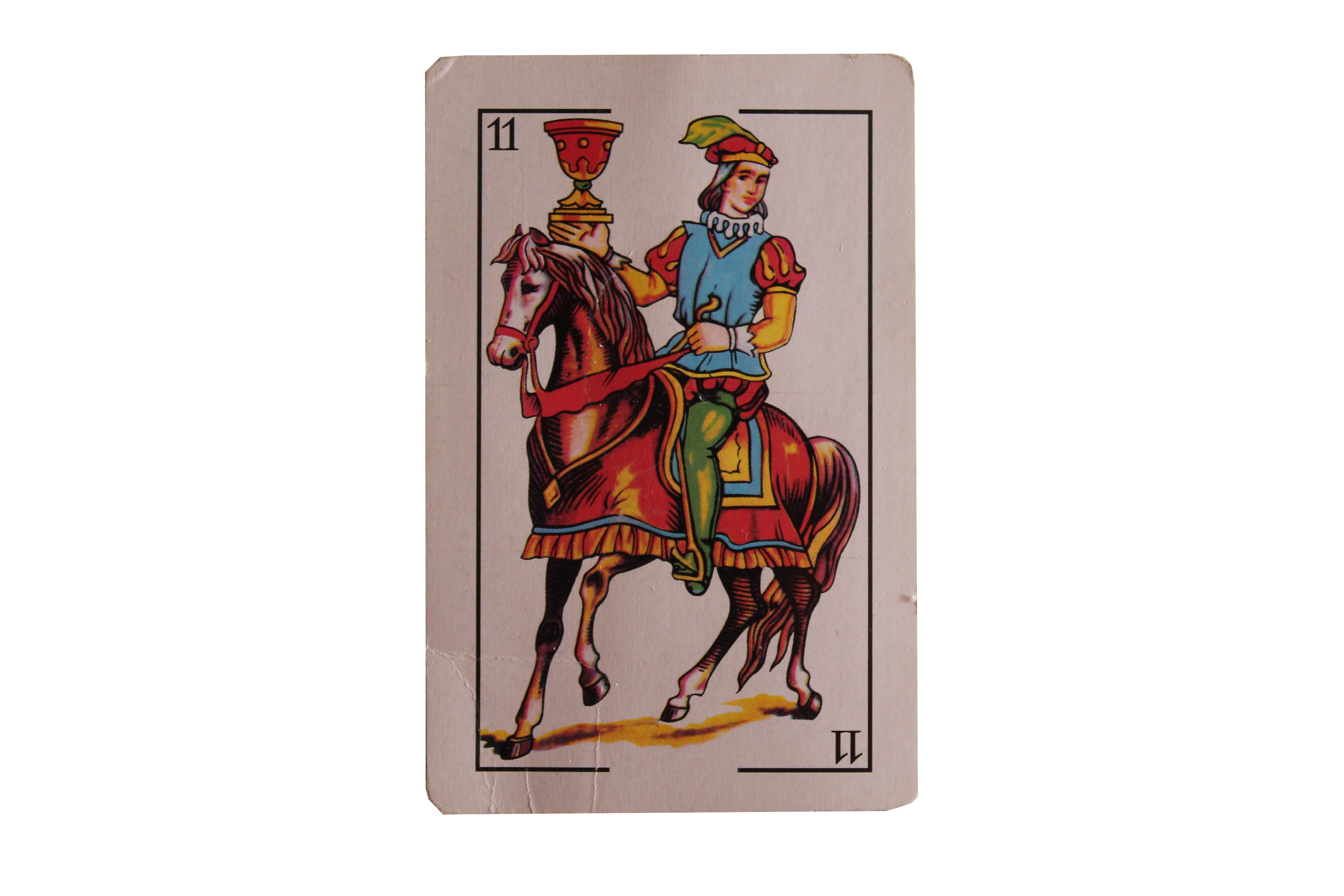
2. Spanish card front view

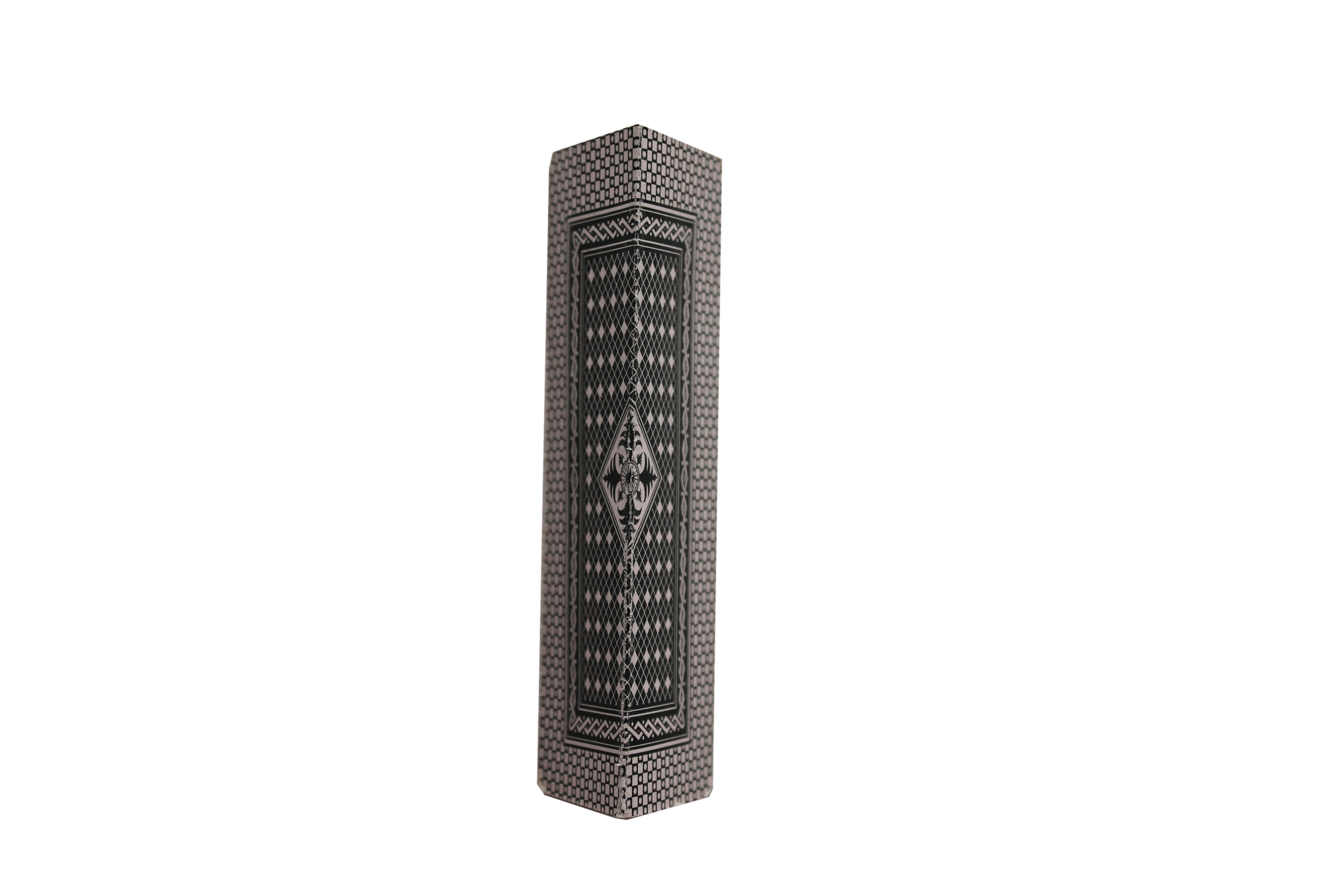
3. Fold up the middle

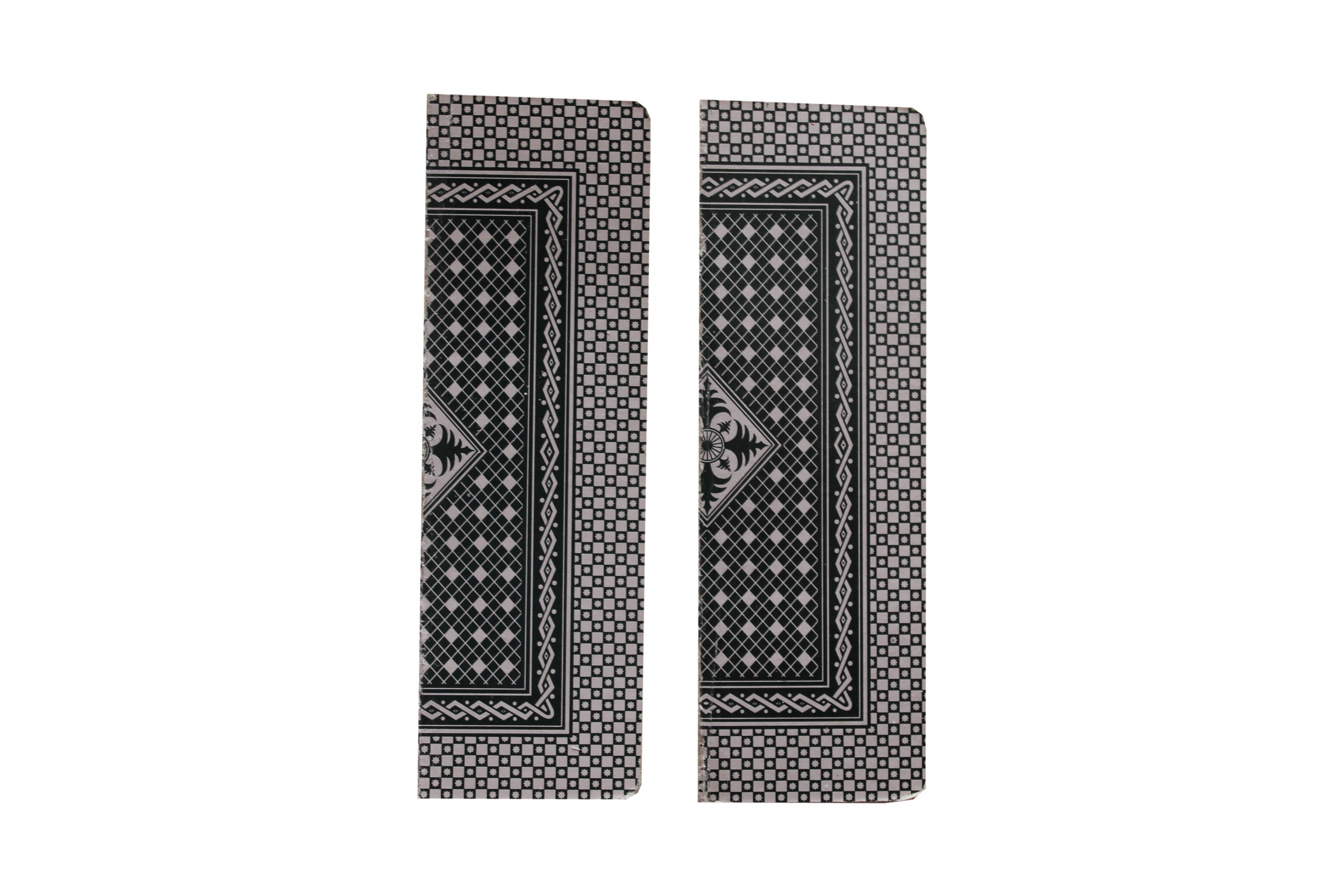
4. Cut down the middle obtaining two equal parts

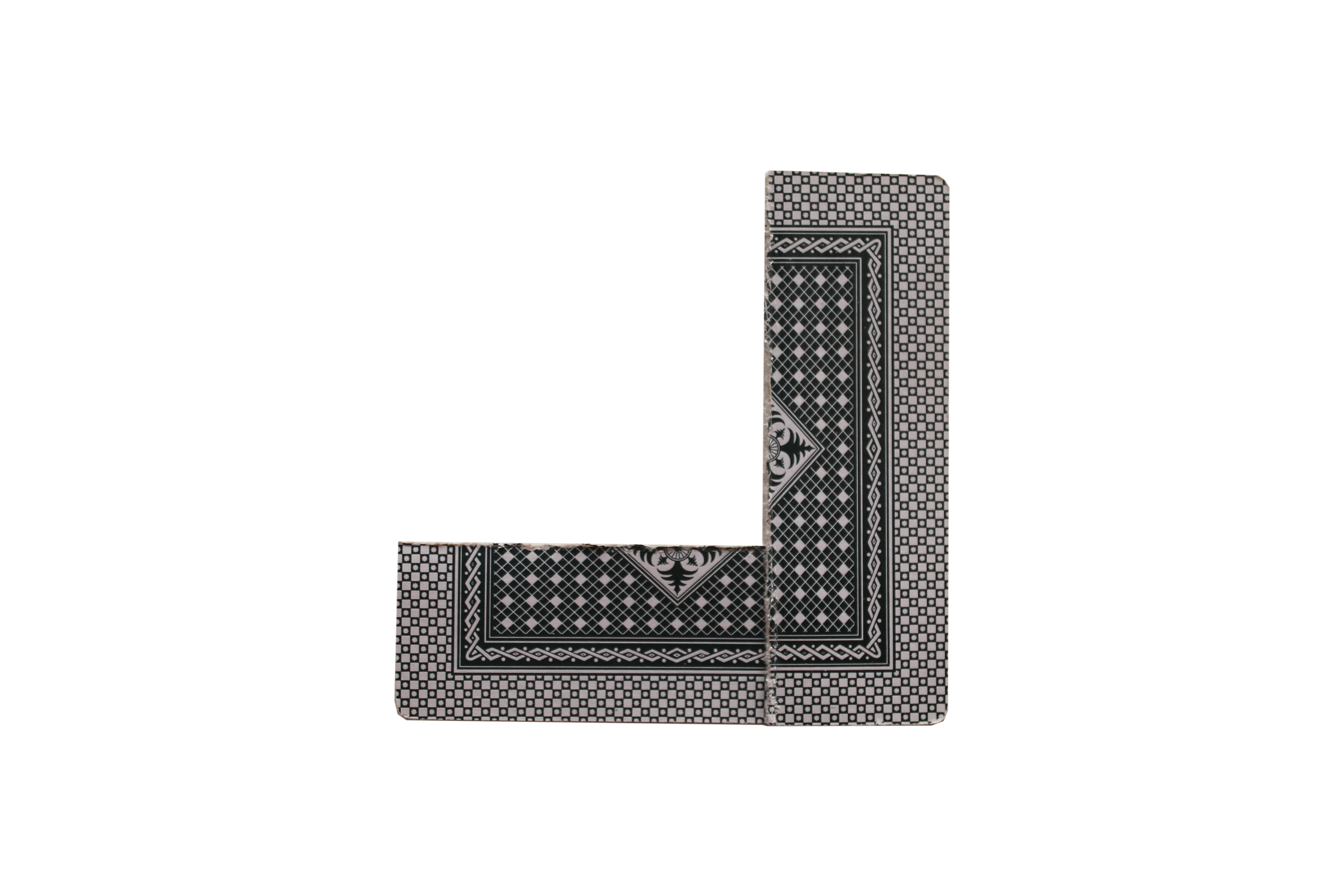
5. The two parts are placed at an angle of 90°

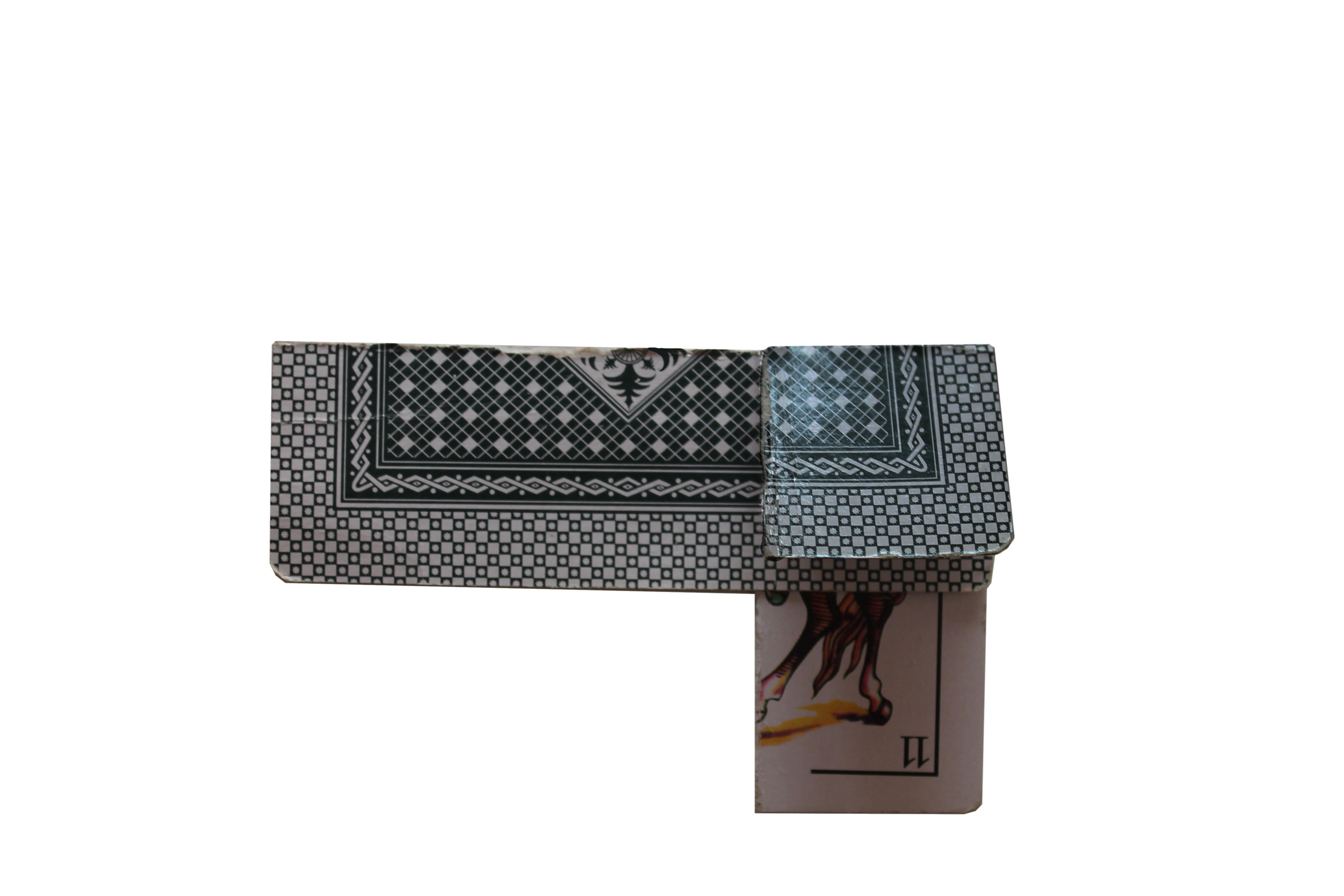
6. The vertical part is folded back and then forward again

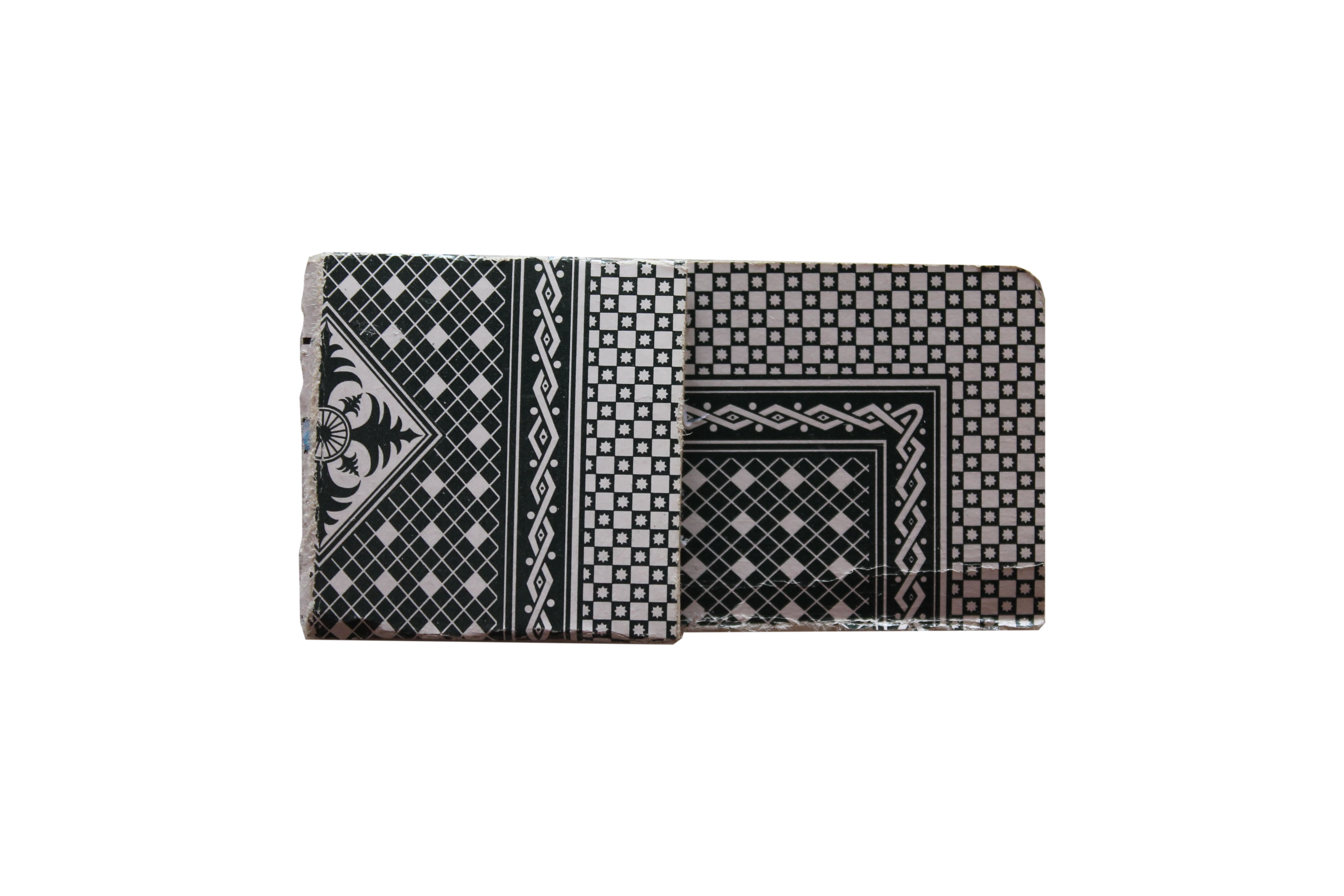
7. The horizontal part is folded back and then forward again inserting the tab into the slot to hold it

== In popular culture ==
In The Simpsons episode "Bart Sells His Soul" (Season 7, Episode 4), Milhouse shows Bart his new collection of Alf pogs, saying, "Remember Alf? He's back, in Pog form!"

== See also ==
- Bachicombat
- Tazos
- Skully (game), a disk based game
- Tiddlywinks, another disk based game, involving a pot at the center
