= Tazos =

Collectible game disks

Tazos are disks that were distributed as promotional items with products of Frito-Lay and its subsidiaries around the world. Tazos have been released in several different formats, ranging from the original circular disks, to octagonal disks, to forms that resemble more of a collectible card.

== Description ==
Tazos are disks that were distributed as promotional items with products of Frito-Lay and its subsidiaries around the world. The idea behind Tazos started out similar to Pogs, whereby each Tazo contained a score value, and a game was played to 'win' Tazos from other players.

Tazos have been released in several different formats, ranging from the original circular disks, to octagonal disks, and in later years, to resemble more of a collectible card. In addition to the Japanese Pog Battle game, some Tazo series feature small incisions around the outside, allowing players to fit them together and build objects. The Star Wars series also included additional pieces which allowed players to construct spaceships.

Tazos are commonly made from a plastic base, but some series have been produced from cardboard or aluminium (such as the Australian Yu-Gi-Oh! Metalix series).

== Series ==
Tazos started out with a set of 100 disks featuring the images of Looney Tunes characters and 124 Tiny Toons tazos in 1994. The disks were added to the products of Mexican snacks company Sabritas and were named after the expression taconazo (to kick with the heel) which was a reference to another popular school game in Mexico where children open bottles with their shoes trying to launch the caps the furthest.

Other sets from around the world include:

- Chiquito de la Calzada (1994, set of 10 in Spain, "chiqui tazos")
- Disney (1994, set of 91)
- Pocahontas (1994, set of 50)
- Los Caballeros del Zodiaco English: Saint Seiya (1994, set of 40)
- The Simpsons (1995, set of 100)
- Looney Tunes (1995, set of 100)
- Monster Munch (1996, set of 30 plus a subsequent set of 10)
- Sailor Moon (1996, set of 100)
- The Mask (TV, 1998)
- Pokémon (1999, set of 51)
- Dinosaurio English: Dinosaur (2000, set of 51)
- Pokémon 2 (2000, set of 100)
- Digimon (2000)
- Pokémon 3 (2001)
- Cubi-Tazos featuring Scooby-Doo (TV, 2001, set of 24)
- Medabots (2002, set of 70 Classic and 70 Metalix)
- Dragon Ball GT (2003, set of 60 Metalix)
- Yu-Gi-Oh! (2004, set of 101)
- Mucha Lucha (2005, set of 150)
- Mucha Lucha 2: La Revancha (2005, set of 180)
- Dragon Ball Z (2005)
- Megaman NT Warrior (2005 set of 29)
- Robots (2005, set of 10)
- Los Simpson English: The Simpsons (TV, 2006–2007, set of 144)
- Bob Esponja English: SpongeBob SquarePants (TV, 2007, set of 163 plus 5 in Cheetos)
- Pokémon 4 Generación Avanzada (2008, set of 235)
- El Tigre: Las Aventuras De Manny Rivera (2008, set of 200)
- WWE (TV, 2009, set of 176)
- Naruto (2009)
- Bakugan Battle Brawlers (TV, June–August 2009 in packages of Cheetos in India, set of 26)
- Nickelodeon (TV, 2010, set of 195)
- Shrek: Para Siempre English: Shrek Forever (2010 in packages of Cheetos in Peru)
- Bakugan Battle Brawlers (TV, 2010 in Cheetos Sorpresa in Peru with the slogan "Descubre el Poder de los Tazos" English: Discover the Power of Tazos, numbered set of 120)
- Star Wars (original trilogy)
- Chester Cheetah
- Space Jam
- Australian Football League
- National Rugby League
- Beyblades
- Angry Birds (2011, including codes to unlock special branded levels)
- Jurassic World (2018)
- Bad Bunny (2019)
- Pac-Man (2020)

== Countries ==
Tazos have been released around the world, in bags of potato chips (crisps) and other snacks including Bollycao, Chipicao, Cheese Tris, Cheetos, Cheetos Sorpresa, Chizitos, Doritos, Fandangos, Lay's Potato Chips, Meridian Real Thai Chicken Chips, Sabritas, Piqueo Snax, Simba Chips, Smith's Potato Crisps, Thins, Twistees, Uncle Chipps, and Walkers.

Countries that have had Tazo releases include:

- Albania
- Argentina
- Australia
- Bahamas, The
- Bahrain
- Bangladesh
- Belarus
- Belgium
- Belize
- Botswana
- Brazil
- Bulgaria
- Chile
- Colombia
- Cuba
- Cyprus
- Dominican Republic, The
- Ecuador
- Egypt
- El Salvador
- Estonia
- France
- Germany
- Gibraltar
- Greece
- Guatemala
- Haiti
- Honduras
- Hungary
- India
- Indonesia
- Israel
- Italy
- Japan
- Jordan
- Kenya
- Latvia
- Lithuania
- Mexico
- Netherlands, The
- New Zealand
- Nigeria
- North Korea
- Oman
- Pakistan
- Panama
- Paraguay
- Peru
- Poland
- Portugal
- Puerto Rico
- Qatar
- Romania
- Russia
- Saudi Arabia
- South Africa
- South Korea
- Spain
- Thailand
- Trinidad and Tobago
- Turkey
- United Kingdom
- United States
- Uruguay
- Venezuela

=== Australian sets ===
Below is a list of official basic Australian Tazos and the year they were released.

Series	Number Run	Year
Looney Tunes	1–60	1995
Cheetah	61–100	1995
Looney Tunes Techno	101–140	1995
The Simpsons	141–180	1996
Chester Cheetah Techno Tazo	181–200	1996
Time Warp Looney Tunes	201-220	1996
Space Jam	1–80	1996
Star Wars	81–160	1997
Batman & Robin	1–40	1997
Dragon Ball Z	1-40	2000
The Simpsons Pickers	1–120	2002
Beyblades Tazo Topz	1–54	2003
Mega Tazo Topz	1–65	2003
Yu-Gi-Oh! Metalix*	1–60	2004
Crush Gear Tazo	1–40	2004
The Simpsons Bowlarama	1–50	2005
Marvel Heroes	1–50	2005
The Simpsons TV Tazo	1–50	2006
AFL Hot Shot Tazo	1–30	2006
NRL Hot Shot Tazo	1–30	2006
Footy NRL Tazo Classic	1–48	2007
Footy NRL Tazo Gold	1–64	2007
Footy AFL Tazo Classic	1–48	2007
Footy AFL Tazo Gold	1–64	2007
Footy Legends NRL	1–72	2008
Footy Legends AFL	1–64	2008

- The Yu-Gi-Oh! Metalix set did contain a couple bonus Tazos offered with a kids magazine K-Zone and at Shell petrol stations.

== See also ==
- Pogs
- Prize (marketing)
