= Chicos de Barrio =

Mexican musical group

- Origin: Torreón, Coahuila, Mexico
- Genres: Cumbia, vallenato, tropical, Latin
- Years active: 1995–present
- Labels: MCM (Metro Casa Musical) (1996–2002); Warner Music (2003); EMI Latin (2004–2006); Far Music (2007–2009); Dasmi Music (2010–present)
- Members: Dimas Maciel, Susana Ortiz, Yiyo Najera, Kiro Olvera, and Alfonso (Poncho)
- Website: chicosdebarrio.com.mx

Chicos de Barrio is a Mexican musical group formed in 1995 in Torreon, Coahuila, Mexico. A large band with a dozen musicians, Chicos de Barrio plays tropical-style Latin music including pop, urban, cumbia and vallenato.

== Discography ==
- Triste Lagunera (1995)
- Te Invito A Bailar (1996)
- Salió Mejor (1997)
- En Tu Corazón (1998)
- Vato Loco (1999)
- La Lola (2000)
- Dominando Y Controlando (2001)
- En La Esquina (2002)
- Barrio Mix (2002)
- El Barrio Me Respalda (2003)
- Reggae Hop (2004)
- Puros Vatos...Choca Y Rebota (2005)
- Década (2006)
- Homenaje Retro (2007)
- The Best Of Da Comark (2008)
- Pamela Chu (2009)
- XV Aniversario Vol.1 (2010)
- XV Aniversario Vol.2 (2010)
- Anécdotas Del Barrio (2011)
- La Manguera Del Chutas (2012)
- Güe, Güe, Güepa (2013)
- Juntos Por Siempre (2014)
- XX Aniversario Vol.1 (2015)
- XX Aniversario Vol.2 (2015)
- El Reencuentro Iniciadores CHDB (2016)
- Evolución (2017)
- Sibirikipao (2018)
- Los Cholos Han Regresado (2019)
- XXV Aniversario Tributo A Los Bukis (2020)
- Una Nueva Oportunidad (2021)
- El Diario De Un Cholo (2022)
- Ya Te La Sabes (2023)
- Los Reyes De La Cumbia Lagunera (2024)
- Más Vale Cholo, Que Mal Acompañado (2025)
- XXX Aniversario Vol.1 Con Los Únicos Y Originales Chicos De Barrio (2026)
- XXX Aniversario Vol.2 Con Los Únicos Y Originales Chicos De Barrio (2026)
