= Kevin Harvick =

American racing driver (born 1975)

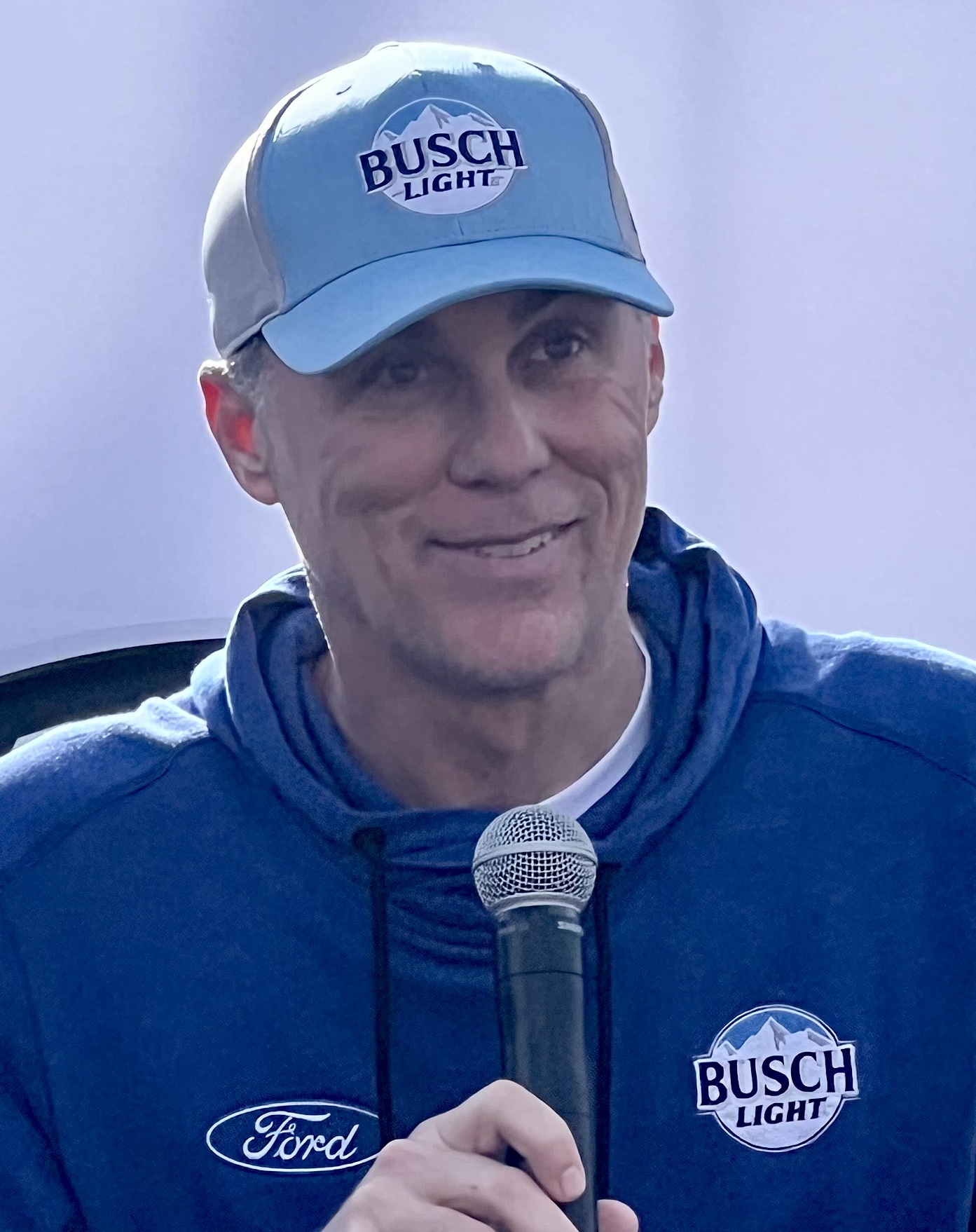
- Harvick at Busch Light Clash at the Coliseum in 2023
- Born: Kevin Michael Harvick; December 8, 1975 (age 50); Bakersfield, California, U.S.
- Height: 5 ft 10 in (1.78 m)
- Weight: 175 lb (79 kg)
- Achievements: 2014 NASCAR Sprint Cup Series Champion; 2020 NASCAR Cup Series Regular Season Champion; 2001, 2006 Busch Series Champion; 1998 Winston West Series Champion; 2002 IROC Champion; 2007 Daytona 500 Winner; 2003, 2019, 2020 Brickyard 400 Winner; 2011, 2013 Coca-Cola 600 Winner; 2007 NEXTEL All-Star Challenge Winner; 2009, 2010, 2013 Sprint Unlimited Winner; 2014, 2020 Southern 500 Winner; 2018 Monster Energy NASCAR All-Star Race Winner; All-time wins leader at Phoenix Raceway (9); 2008 Oxford 250 Winner
- Awards: 2001 NASCAR Winston Cup Series Rookie of the Year; 2000 NASCAR Busch Series Rookie of the Year; 2001 NASCAR Busch Series Most Popular Driver; 1995 NASCAR Featherlite Southwest Series Rookie of the Year; 2015 ESPY Awards Best Driver; Named one of NASCAR's 75 Greatest Drivers (2023); West Coast Stock Car Hall of Fame (2023); NASCAR Hall of Fame (2027)

NASCAR Cup Series career
- 826 races run over 23 years
- 2023 position: 13th
- Best finish: 1st (2014)
- First race: 2001 Dura Lube 400 (Rockingham)
- Last race: 2023 NASCAR Cup Series Championship Race (Phoenix)
- First win: 2001 Cracker Barrel Old Country Store 500 (Atlanta)
- Last win: 2022 Federated Auto Parts 400 (Richmond)
Wins	Top tens	Poles
60	444	31

NASCAR O'Reilly Auto Parts Series career
- 349 races run over 21 years
- 2021 position: 77th
- Best finish: 1st (2001, 2006)
- First race: 1999 Kmart 200 (Rockingham)
- Last race: 2021 Pennzoil 150 (Indianapolis G.P.)
- First win: 2000 Carquest Auto Parts 250 (Gateway)
- Last win: 2018 Rinnai 250 (Atlanta)
Wins	Top tens	Poles
47	261	25

NASCAR FedEx Freight Truck Series career
- 124 races run over 19 years
- 2021 position: 105th
- Best finish: 12th (1999)
- First race: 1995 Spears Manufacturing 200 (Mesa Marin)
- Last race: 2021 Pinty's Truck Race on Dirt (Bristol Dirt)
- First win: 2002 Chevy Silverado 150 (Phoenix)
- Last win: 2012 Kroger 250 (Martinsville)
Wins	Top tens	Poles
14	62	4

ARCA Menards Series career
- 2 races run over 1 year
- Best finish: 61st (1999)
- First race: 1999 EasyCare Vehicle Service Contracts 100 (Charlotte)
- Last race: 1999 Winn-Dixie 300 (Talladega)
Wins	Top tens	Poles
0	2	0

ARCA Menards Series West career
- 24 races run over 9 years
- Best finish: 1st (1998)
- First race: 1996 Las Vegas 300K (Las Vegas)
- Last race: 2018 Bakersfield 175 presented by NAPA Auto Parts (Kern County)
- First win: 1998 Cactus Clash (Las Vegas)
- Last win: 2017 Carneros 200 (Sonoma)
Wins	Top tens	Poles
6	18	8
- Statistics up to date as of November 5, 2023.

Kevin Michael Harvick (born December 8, 1975) is an American former professional stock car racing driver and commentator for NASCAR on Fox. He competed full-time in the NASCAR Cup Series from 2001 to 2023, winning the championship in 2014. He claimed 60 Cup wins, ranking tenth in series history, including the 2007 Daytona 500 and a record nine wins at Phoenix Raceway.

Harvick also won the 2001 and 2006 Xfinity Series championships. He is the third of only six drivers to have won a championship in both the Cup Series and the Xfinity Series, and the fifth of 36 drivers to have won a race in each of NASCAR's three national series.

The driver has claimed a combined 121 wins in NASCAR national series (Cup, Xfinity, Truck). ranking third all-time behind Richard Petty and Kyle Busch, respectively. He also has the second most starts in NASCAR national series, behind Kyle Busch.

In 2015, Harvick began working as a broadcaster off-and-on for NASCAR on FOX duriing Xfinity Series races while still racing full-time. Since retiring from the NASCAR Cup Series, Harvick has called Cup Series races for Fox starting in 2024.

Harvick is the owner of Kevin Harvick Incorporated, a race team that fielded cars in the Xfinity Series from 2004 to 2011 and the Truck Series between 2001 and 2011. The team's No. 29 late model is driven part-time in the CARS Tour by Harvick himself, alongside the No. 62 late model, which is driven full-time by Harvick's son Keelan Harvick. In the media, he has sometimes been nicknamed "the Closer" and "Happy Harvick."

== Early life ==
Harvick was born in 1975 in Bakersfield, California, to parents Mike and JoNell (Walker) Harvick, and has a younger sister, Amber. He began kart racing at an early age, after his parents bought him a go-kart as a kindergarten graduation gift. Harvick grew up a fan of IndyCar driver and fellow Bakersfield native Rick Mears, and raced go-karts with Mears' son Clint. He achieved considerable success on the go-kart racing circuit, earning seven national championships and two Grand National championships.

While in high school, Harvick began racing late models part-time in 1992 in the NASCAR Featherlite Southwest Series. During the racing offseason, he competed on the North High School wrestling team, qualifying for a CIF Central Section title in his weight class his senior year. Harvick also played baseball, basketball, football, and soccer. After graduation, he attended Bakersfield College with the intention of majoring in architecture, but later dropped out in order to pursue a full-time racing career.

== NASCAR career ==
=== Early career ===
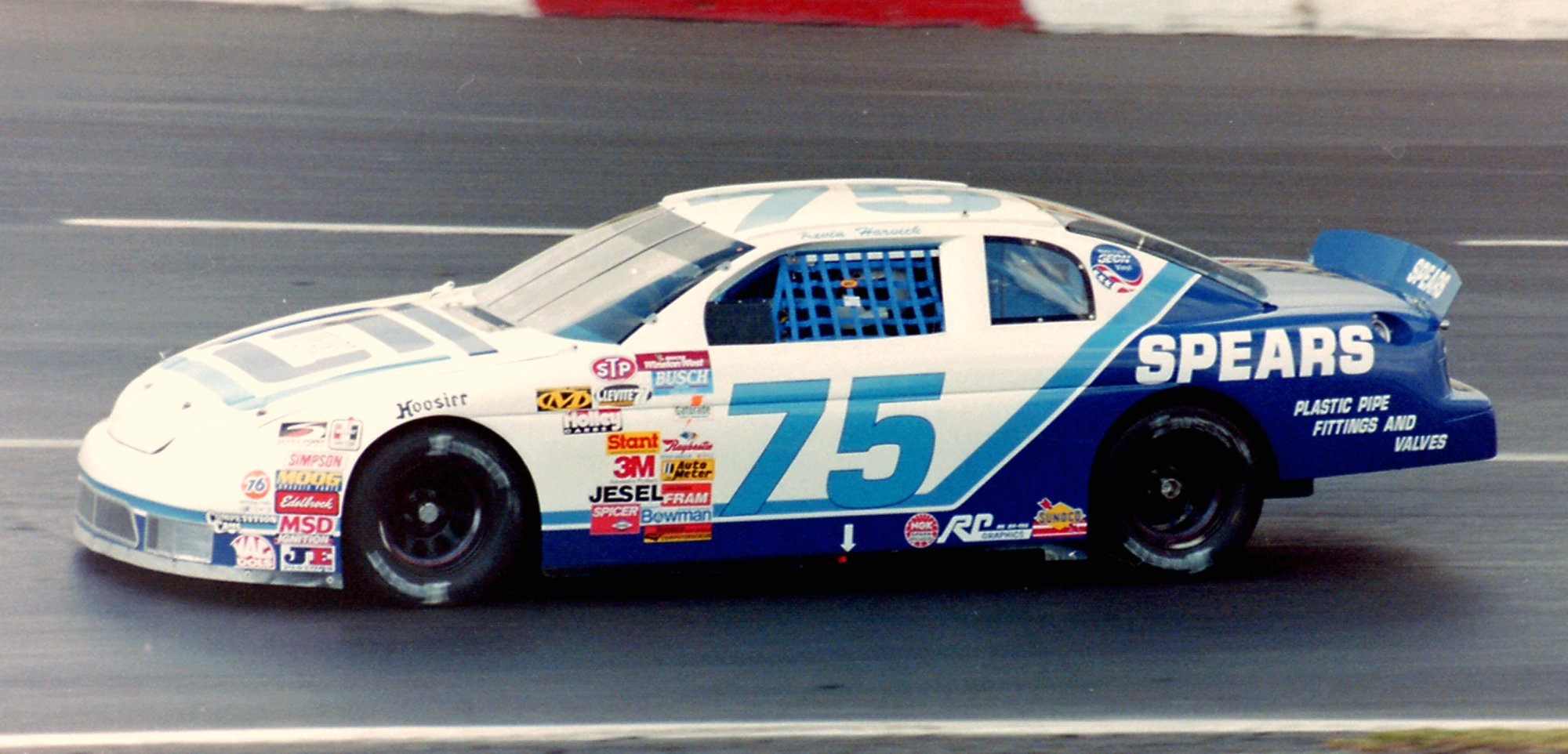

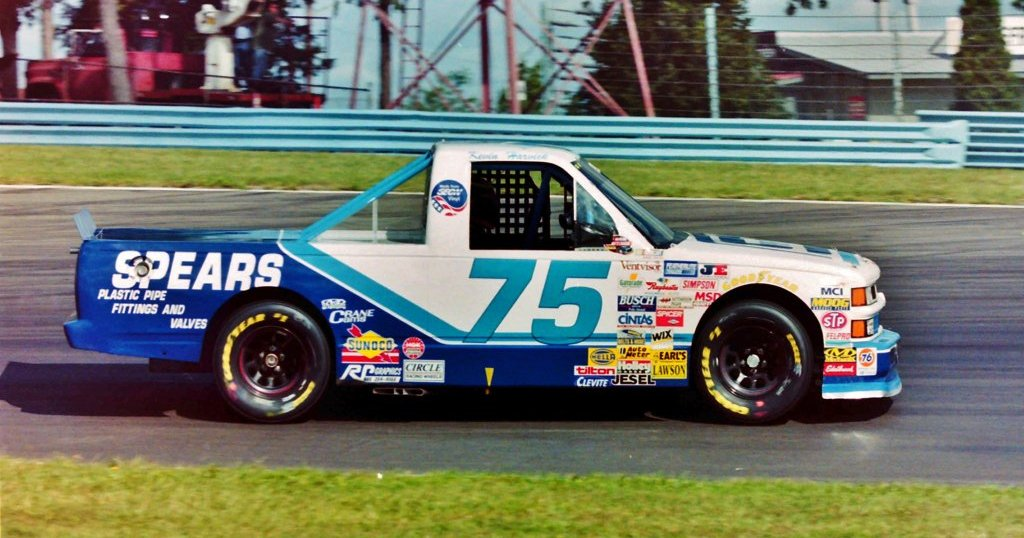
Harvick's 1997 Winston West car and Craftsman Series truck

Harvick made his Craftsman Truck Series debut in 1995 at the Mesa Marin Raceway, in his hometown of Bakersfield, where he started and finished 27th in his family-owned No. 72. He drove four races in the No. 72 the next season, his best finish was 11th at Mesa Marin. In 1997, he signed to drive the No. 75 for Spears Motorsports mid-season, posting two eighth-place finishes. He ran a full schedule the next season, posting three top-fives and finishing seventeenth in points. Harvick also moved up to the NASCAR Grand National Division, AutoZone West Series in 1997, and in 1998 Harvick won five races on his way to the Winston West Series championship while driving for Spears. He received his first real national exposure during the winter of 1997/1998 on ESPN2's coverage of the NASCAR Winter Heat Series at Tucson Raceway Park. In 1999, he drove the No. 98 Porter Cable Ford for Liberty Racing, finishing twelfth in points with six top-fives.

=== 1999–2000: NASCAR Busch Series ===
On October 23, 1999, Harvick made his first NASCAR Busch Series start in the Kmart 200 at the Rockingham Speedway in the No. 2 Chevrolet. He would start 24th and finish 42nd due to engine failure. The race would be his only start in 1999. In 2000, Harvick would sign with Richard Childress Racing to drive the No. 2 Chevrolet for his first full Busch Series season. Despite failing to qualify for the second race of the season at Rockingham, Harvick would go on to win the NASCAR Busch Series Rookie of the Year award with three wins, eight top-five finishes, and sixteen top-tens as well as garnering a third-place points finish.

=== 2001: Cup Series debut, replacing Earnhardt ===
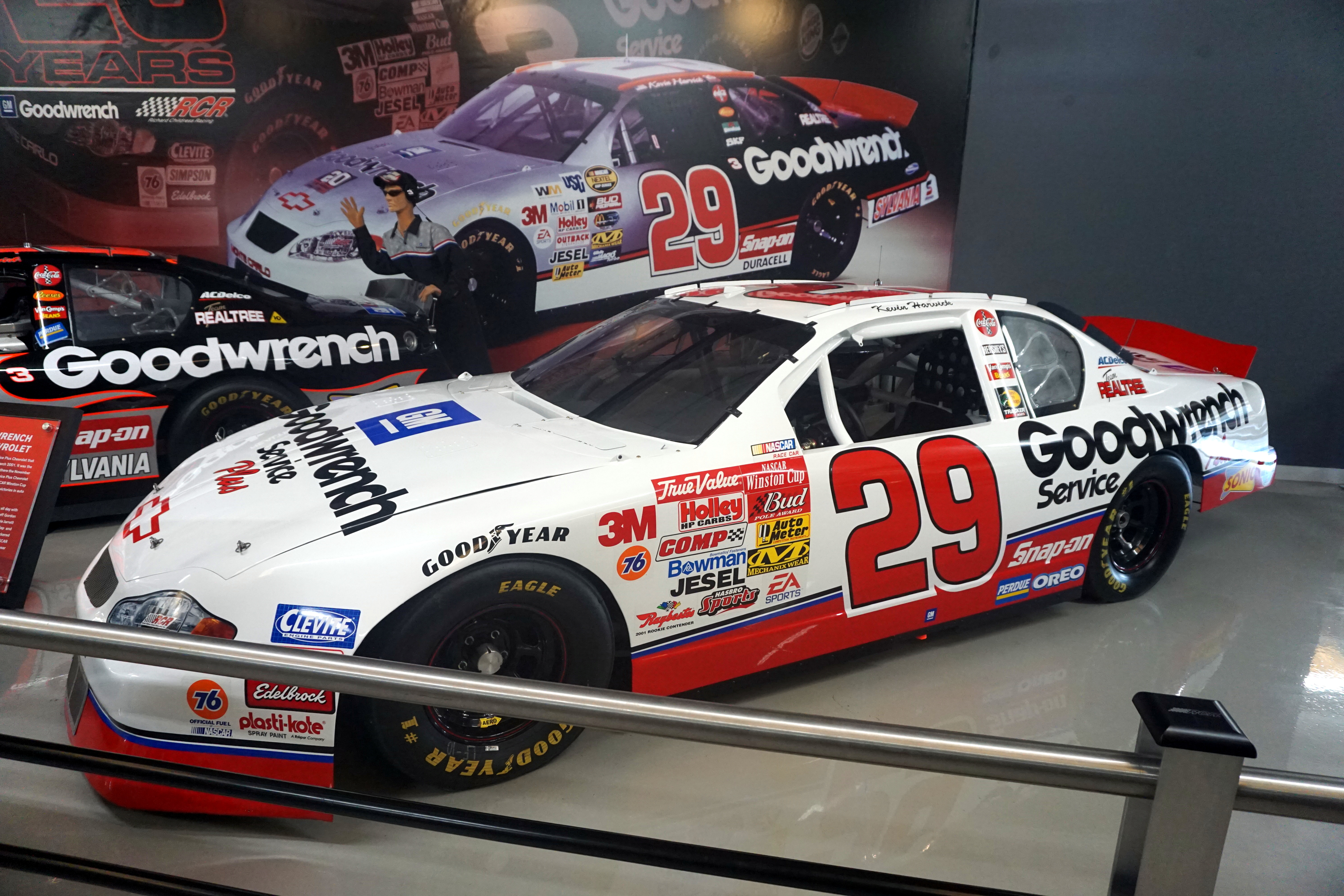
Kevin Harvick's No. 29 GM Goodwrench Chevrolet Monte Carlo

For 2001, Childress planned to run Harvick in the No. 2 ACDelco Chevy in the Busch Series full-time again, while developing him into the Winston Cup Series with up to seven races in the No. 30 AOL Chevy. He planned to race Harvick for a full schedule in 2002. The death of Dale Earnhardt on the last lap of the 2001 Daytona 500 changed Childress's plans, and Harvick began his first Cup race the following week in the Dura Lube 400 at Rockingham, filling the seat vacated by Earnhardt's passing in the renumbered No. 29 GM Goodwrench Service Plus Chevrolet.

On March 11, 2001, in the Cracker Barrel Old Country Store 500 at Atlanta Motor Speedway, only three weeks after Earnhardt's death, Harvick won his first career Winston Cup race in just his third start by narrowly edging Jeff Gordon. He won the race by only six one-thousandths of a second (.006). After the win, he paid tribute to Earnhardt, driving a Polish Victory Lap on the track backward with three fingers held aloft outside the driver's window as a show of honor and respect. At the time, this broke the record for earliest career start for a driver to win a race in the Modern Era, since surpassed by Jamie McMurray and Trevor Bayne, both of whom accomplished the feat in their second starts, and then by Shane van Gisbergen in 2023 in his debut.

He won his second career Cup race at Chicagoland Speedway in Joliet, Illinois. At the end of the season, he finished with two victories, six top-fives, and sixteen top-tens. Harvick was awarded the NASCAR Rookie of the Year Award and secured a ninth-place finish in the 2001 points standings. He also won the Busch Series championship, becoming the first driver to win the Busch Series championship while also driving full-time in the Winston Cup Series with a top-ten finish. Harvick would end the season winning six pole positions, and making 69 starts: 35 in the Cup Series, an appearance in the Winston, 33 in the Busch Series, and one in the Craftsman Truck Series at Richmond International Raceway for Rick Carelli.

=== 2002 ===
In 2002, Harvick spent the season concentrating on running the Cup Series and would only start four races in the Busch Series. Harvick began the 2002 season making his first Daytona 500 start on the outside pole next to Jimmie Johnson, but his day ended after triggering an eighteen-car crash on lap 148 while running second to Jeff Gordon, relegating him to a 36th-place finish. Later in the season, he was fined for a post-race incident with Greg Biffle at Bristol Motor Speedway. Harvick was also suspended for rough driving in a Truck race at Martinsville, in which he announced on his radio that he intentionally spun out driver Coy Gibbs, prompting NASCAR to immediately take him out of the race. Even though it was heard on the radio that he did, Harvick lied in a post-race interview, saying that he did not purposely wreck Gibbs. Harvick was banned from the Cup Series race the next day, with Kenny Wallace replacing him; he was also fined $35,000 and placed into another probation (he was already on probation for the Biffle incident). Harvick rebounded and scored his first career Winston Cup pole position in the Pepsi 400 at Daytona. Later in the season, he took his third Cup win at Chicagoland Speedway. This would prove to be one of the only bright spots in a disappointing season, as he finished 21st in the 2002 points standings with one win, one pole, five top-fives, and eight top-tens. Harvick became the 2002 IROC Champion in his first season in the Series, winning at California Speedway. In Trucks, Harvick began fielding his own No. 6 truck, driving himself in five races and winning at Phoenix.

=== 2003 ===
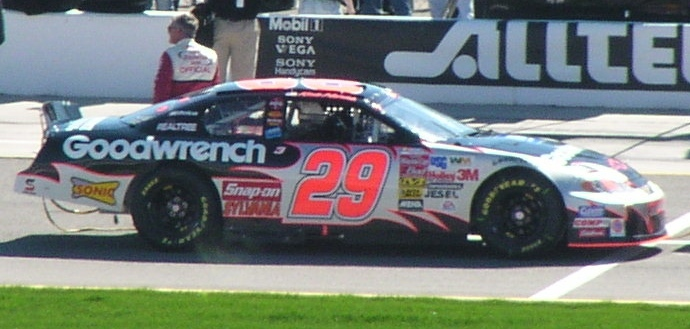
Harvick's No. 29 before the 2003 Daytona 500

In the 2003 season, Harvick teamed with crew chief Todd Berrier in the Cup Series, with whom he had won the Busch championship in 2001. Together, they won the Brickyard 400 at Indianapolis. Harvick and his team jumped to fifth in the 2003 point standings, coming within 252 points of Matt Kenseth. In the Busch Series, Harvick was teamed with Johnny Sauter, driving the No. 21 Hershey's-sponsored PayDay car. The two would combine for three wins, sixteen top-fives, and 24 top-tens, with Harvick posting all three wins. They would give Childress the NASCAR Busch Series owners' championship that season. Harvick competed in nineteen of the 34 races, and Sauter competed in the other fifteen. Harvick also scored eight pole positions and finished sixteenth in the final drivers' standings.

=== 2004: First winless season ===
On August 28, during the 2004 Sharpie 500 at Bristol Motor Speedway, Harvick had one of the most bizarre sequences of events happen to him. On lap 323, Harvick radioed to his crew that his right arm had fallen asleep and had gone numb, which made it difficult for him to operate his race car properly, and he needed a backup driver. The caution came out five laps later, and Harvick made his way onto pit road and was pulled out of the car. He was replaced by Kyle Petty, who was involved in an earlier wreck in the same race. Petty finished six laps down in 24th for Harvick. Harvick was still able to stay 8th in points but in the last 2 regular season races at California and Richmond, Harvick would finish in 28th and twelfth causing Harvick to fall from eighth to fifteenth in the standings missing out on the inaugural Chase for the Cup. Harvick's season was also known for his conflicts with Matt Kenseth at Pocono and rookie Kasey Kahne at Phoenix. While winless in the 2004 Cup season, Harvick placed third in the voting for Most Popular Driver. He had fourteen top-ten finishes and finished fourteenth in points. Harvick was paired with another driver in the Busch Series, rookie Clint Bowyer. They combined for one win, thirteen top-fives, and twenty top-tens in the No. 21 car, with Reese's Peanut Butter Cups as a sponsor. Harvick drove the No. 29 Busch car in the final race of the season at Homestead–Miami Speedway in the Ford 300, which he would claim as his second win of the season. He finished 14th in the final standings. The No. 21 car finished fourth in the owner's standings.

=== 2005 ===
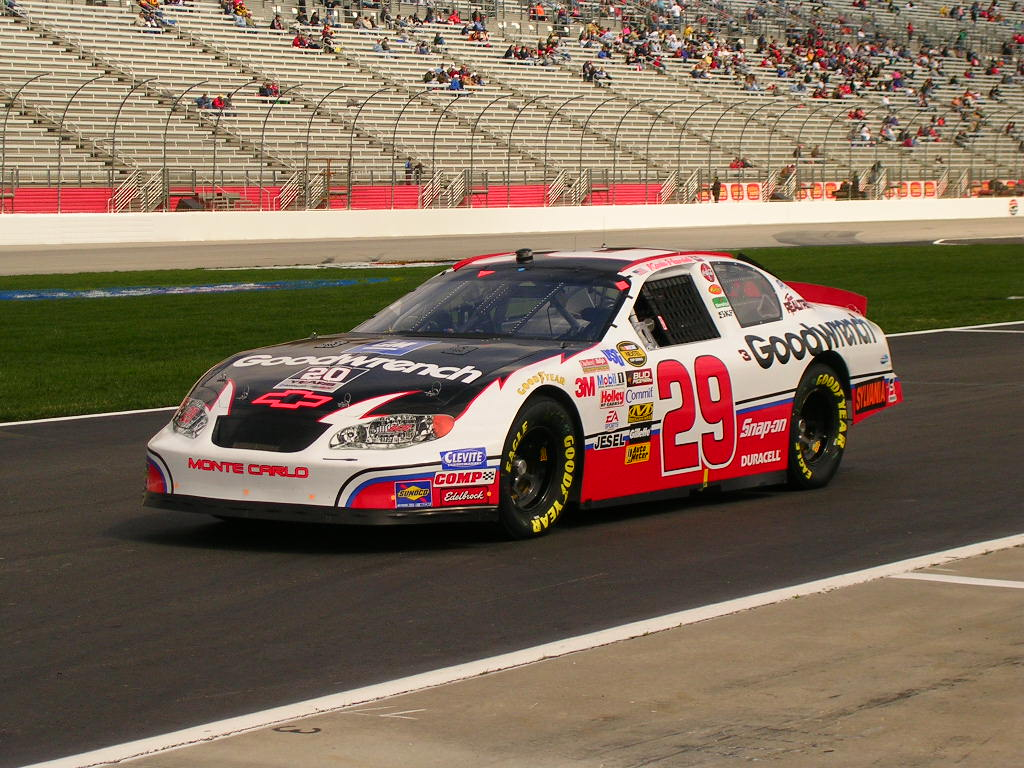
Harvick at Atlanta Motor Speedway in 2005.

In the 2005 season, Harvick's only Cup win came at the Food City 500 at Bristol Motor Speedway, despite starting towards the rear of the field. He won without the assistance of crew chief Todd Berrier, who was serving a four-week suspension for a rules violation. In the Busch Series, Harvick was paired with Brandon Miller. Harvick and Miller combined for three wins, fifteen top-fives, and nineteen top-tens to give the No. 21 its second fourth-place finish in the owner's standings. Harvick would win his first "sweep" of his career at Bristol, winning both the Sharpie Professional 250 Busch race and the Food City 500 Cup race, also giving him a record fourth Busch Series win at the track (tying with Morgan Shepherd). Harvick finished fourteenth in the Cup series standings and eighteenth in the Busch series driver's standings.

=== 2006: Second Busch Championship and first Chase appearance ===
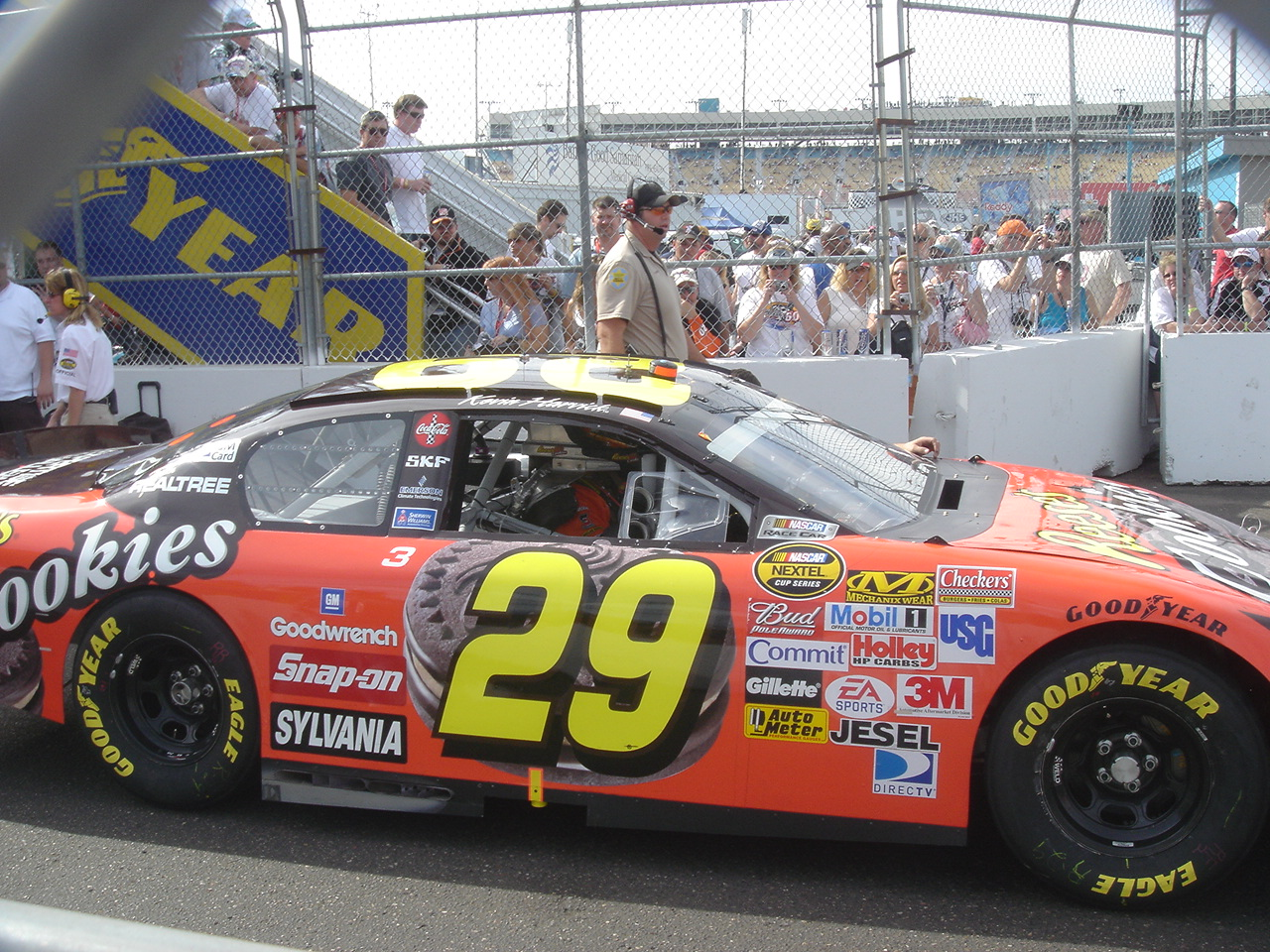
Harvick awaiting Happy Hour prior to his win at Phoenix

In 2006, Harvick decided to run both of NASCAR's Top 2 series full-time, driving for Richard Childress. In the Busch Series, Harvick would be scheduled to run all 35 races, with three different cars. He ran four races for his team in the No. 33, the season opener at Daytona in Childress's No. 29, and the remaining thirty races for RCR's No. 21. He won his first Busch Series race of the 2006 season at Nashville Superspeedway. He followed the win with a weekend sweep of the Busch Series and Sprint Cup races at Phoenix International Raceway. Harvick had nine wins, 23 top-fives, and 32 top-tens in the Busch Series. He clinched the 2006 NASCAR Busch Series championship on October 13, 2006, at Lowe's Motor Speedway in the Dollar General 300. It was the earliest clinch of the championship ever in the Busch Series, locking up the title with four races to go. He ended the season with a record 824-point margin in the final standings.

In the Nextel Cup series, Harvick, along with teammate Jeff Burton, scored the first berths for Richard Childress Racing in the Chase for the Cup. Harvick would have three wins, eleven top-fives, and fourteen top-tens going into the chase.

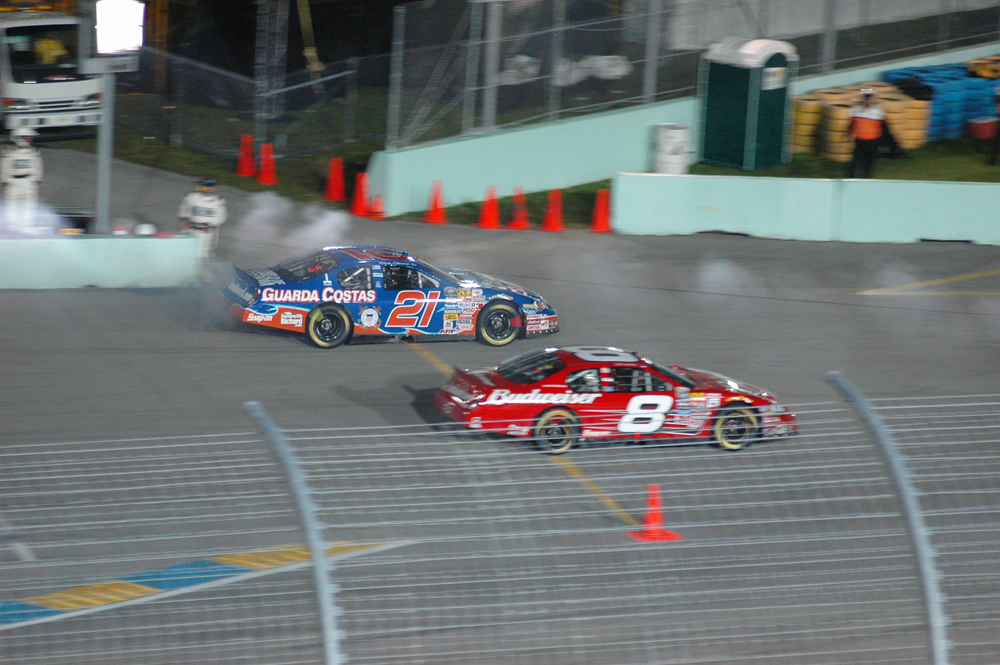
Harvick (#21) during his 2006 Busch championship season, racing Dale Earnhardt Jr. (#8) off pit road

After a dominant win at New Hampshire, Harvick would have a substandard Chase run. He fell to sixth place in the point standings until he finished third at Texas. Following that was another dominating performance in the Checker Auto Parts 500 at Phoenix International Raceway on November 12. Harvick would win that race, moving him up to third in points. At the season finale at Homestead-Miami Speedway, Harvick would finish fifth in the race and slip to fourth in the final standings to eventual 2006 NASCAR Sprint Cup Series champion Jimmie Johnson.

=== 2007: Daytona 500 win ===
Harvick opened the 2007 Sprint Cup series with a dramatic final lap pass in the Daytona 500, beating Mark Martin by .020 seconds in a green-white-checkered finish, the closest margin at the 500 since electronic scoring started in 1993. He would become only the fourth NASCAR driver to sweep both the Nationwide and Cup races in the opening weekend at Daytona. With the win, Harvick also became the sixth of eight drivers to win both the Daytona 500 and the Brickyard 400, following Jeff Gordon, Dale Earnhardt, Dale Jarrett, Bill Elliott, Jimmie Johnson, and preceding Jamie McMurray and Ryan Newman. Harvick would be quiet for the remainder of the season, his only other win coming in the Sprint All-Star Race and finishing 10th in points.

In 2007, Harvick started the Nationwide Series season by winning the Orbitz 300 at Daytona, claiming his first win in a restrictor-plate race, as well as the first win for new sponsor AutoZone in NASCAR's Nationwide Series. He also won at New Hampshire International Speedway, winning the Camping World 200 presented by RVs.com. He also ended up unexpectedly winning the inaugural race at Montreal in August, the NAPA Auto Parts 200, after two laps to go, leader Robby Gordon was black-flagged for intentionally causing a crash involving rookie Marcos Ambrose. The win was considered a bit of an upset as many expected the road course ringers to dominate, and Harvick had started 43rd in the race due to a driver change.

=== 2008: Second winless season ===
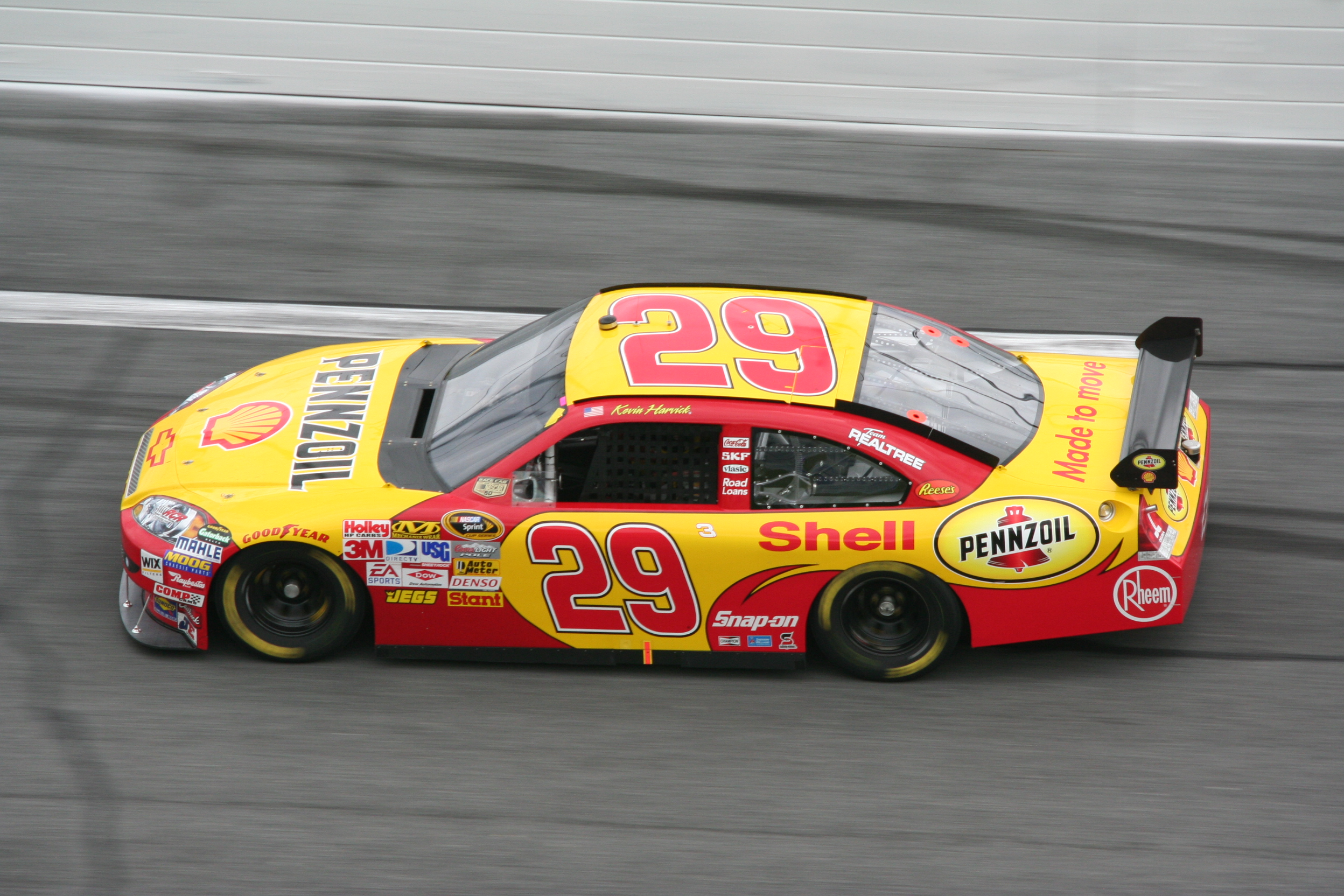
2008 Sprint Cup car

Harvick went winless in 2008, but he was still able to post a fourth-place ranking in the 2008 Chase for the Sprint Cup. The fourth-place finish in the 2008 standings tied 2006 for his highest points position at the end of the season. Harvick also went the entire season without a single DNF for the second straight year. In the Nationwide Series, he ran twenty-two races for his team with sponsorship from Camping World, Rheem, and RoadLoans. He did not win a race in this series either. His lone win came in a Truck race at Phoenix.

=== 2009: Third winless season ===
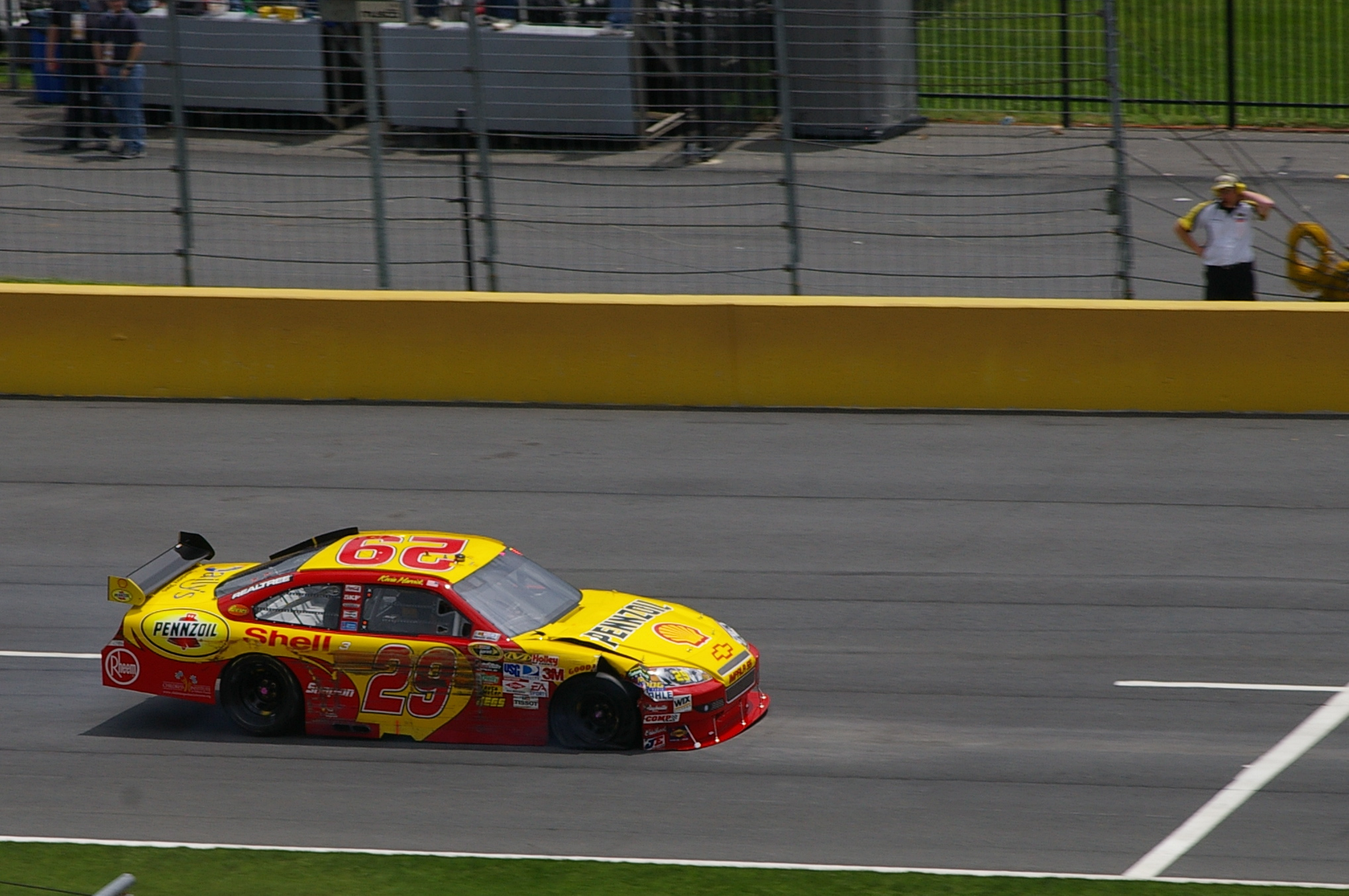
2009 Sprint Cup car following a crash

Harvick started the 2009 season by winning the Budweiser Shootout with a last-lap pass on Jamie McMurray. After Harvick damaged his primary car for the 2009 Daytona 500, his team switched to his Shootout car, and he finished second when the race was declared official early due to rain.

This wasn't his worst season, despite the point standings. He didn't get a single win in the cup series this year, knowing that he was successful in the Nationwide series and the truck series, having a total of five wins this season. Auto Club in California, Harvick blew his engine and suffered his first DNF in 82 starts. He won the first 2009 Nationwide Series race at Bristol, his first win in his car. In addition, he won the Camping World Truck Series race at Martinsville Speedway. During the season, Gil Martin became the new crew chief for Harvick as Childress decided to switch all team members of the No. 07 and No. 29 except the drivers and spotters, thus giving Casey Mears Harvick's crew chief Todd Berrier. In the first five races following the switch, Harvick finished with an average of 25.4, finishing 34th, eleventh, 41st, seventeenth, and 24th respectively. A short time later, reports surfaced stating that Harvick had asked for a release of his contract at the end of the 2009 season to join Stewart–Haas Racing for the 2010 season. Harvick refused to comment publicly on the subject of where he would be driving in 2010. His best race came at the Pep Boys Auto 500 at Atlanta Motor Speedway, where Harvick had the best car in a long run and led for most of the race, but was denied victory after a late-race caution from which later eventual race winner Kasey Kahne took advantage of when he went past Harvick on the restart; he finished second. He would miss the chase for the first time since 2005 and finished a disappointing nineteenth in the final standings.

=== 2010: Redemption ===
Harvick's 2010 season was considered a bounce-back year. He started the same way he did in 2009 by winning the Budweiser Shootout with a pass in the penultimate lap in a green-white-checkered situation. Harvick placed second in his Gatorade Duel by inches to Jimmie Johnson. He led the most laps in the Daytona 500 but ended up finishing seventh. He followed up his seventh at Daytona with a second at Auto Club Speedway again to Jimmie Johnson. After the race, Harvick told media members that the No. 48 team (of Johnson) "had a golden horseshoe stuck up their ass". Following the race, Harvick followed up with another second-place finish to Johnson at Las Vegas Motor Speedway. He won the Aaron's 499 after three green-white-checkered situations, passing Jamie McMurray in what was the 88th lead change of the race, setting a new NASCAR record. On July 3, Harvick captured his second win of the year by winning the Coke Zero 400 at Daytona. On August 15, Harvick captured his third win of the year by winning the Carfax 400 at Michigan. His win at Michigan locked him into the Chase for the Sprint Cup for the fourth time. He finished the regular season in first place in points but started the Chase in third after the points were adjusted. During the ten-race Chase, Harvick scored five top-fives and nine top-tens. Despite scoring an average finish of 5.8 (best in the 2010 Chase and third-best all-time in the Chase), Harvick finished third overall, 41 points behind 2010 Champion Jimmie Johnson. However, under a full-season points format, Harvick would've won his first championship by 285 points over Johnson by locking up the championship a week early in Phoenix with a sixth-place finish.

Harvick also won his first career pole in the Camping World Truck Series at Gateway International Raceway in his own No. 2 Chevrolet Silverado. This added Harvick to the short list of NASCAR drivers who have won a pole award and a race in each of NASCAR's three major series.

=== 2011: Feud with Kyle Busch ===
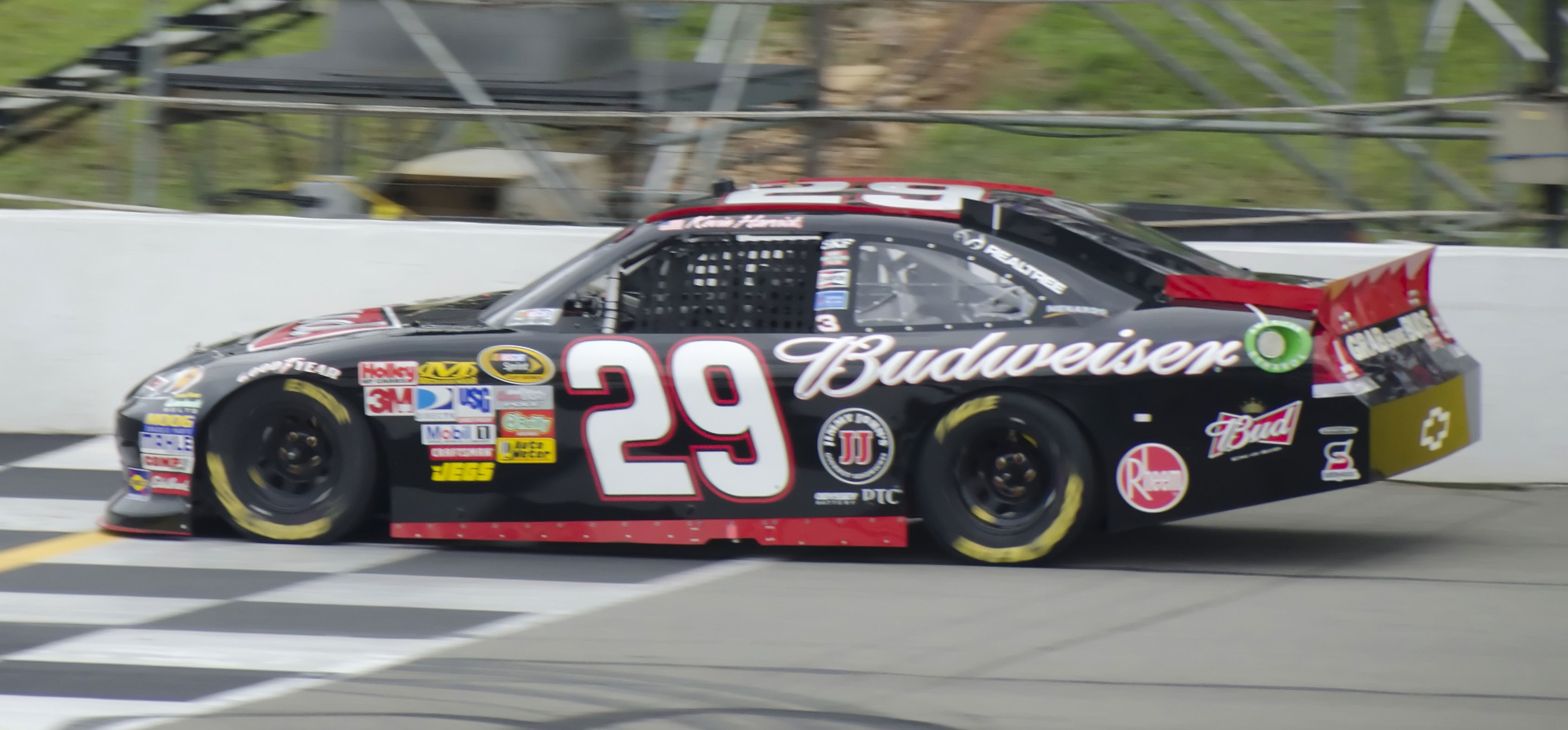
Harvick's No. 29 at Pocono Raceway in 2011

With the departure of Royal Dutch Shell at the end of 2010, the No. 29 teams were searching for a new sponsor. In August 2010, it was announced that for 2011, the car's primary sponsor would be with Budweiser for twenty races. Adding to Harvick's new sponsorship, on January 25, 2011, Jimmy John's and Richard Childress Racing reached a multi-year agreement to sponsor the No. 29 Sprint Cup team for six races in 2011. Harvick won his fifteenth career Cup race at Auto Club Speedway after passing defending series champion, Jimmie Johnson in the final turn in a finish resembling the previous race in 2010. As a joke to Harvick's words in 2010, Johnson asked Harvick in post-race ceremonies if "I can have my golden horseshoe back." Harvick took his second consecutive win of the year at Martinsville Speedway. Harvick then won the Coca-Cola 600 after Earnhardt Jr. ran out of fuel in the last turn on Lap 402. He would then later win at Richmond, narrowly beating Jeff Gordon due to a late-race pit stop that shuffled Harvick to the lead.

During the 2011 season, Kevin Harvick and fellow driver Kyle Busch were embroiled in a feud. After Harvick intentionally wrecked Busch at the 2010 Ford 400 at Homestead, he and Busch tangled several times during the 2011 season. A post-race incident at Darlington in May 2011 led NASCAR to put both drivers on probation and fine them $25,000. Later that season, Kyle Busch tangled with a bunch of drivers connected to Harvick's team, such as Elliott Sadler and Ron Hornaday Jr. Harvick was able to finish well in all three series, finishing third in points in Cup, and clinching the 2011 Truck Series Owner's Championship in his final season as a team owner.

At the season's end, Harvick announced that he would shut down Kevin Harvick, Inc. because he wanted to focus on winning a Sprint Cup Series championship. In his statement announcing the closure, Harvick said that the difference in costs of similar bodies between Nationwide and Cup Series cars made it mathematically impossible for a non-Cup-affiliated team to operate effectively. Harvick also admitted that his original goal in forming KHI was to achieve the success in the Truck Series that he wasn't able to get before driving in Winston Cup, and it blossomed into a venture to build drivers' careers. He sold KHI to Richard Childress.

=== 2012 ===
Although winless in the regular season, Harvick made the 2012 Chase through consistency. At Phoenix, Harvick avoided a chaos-filled race to collect his only win of the season and the nineteenth of his career. He went on to finish eighth in points.

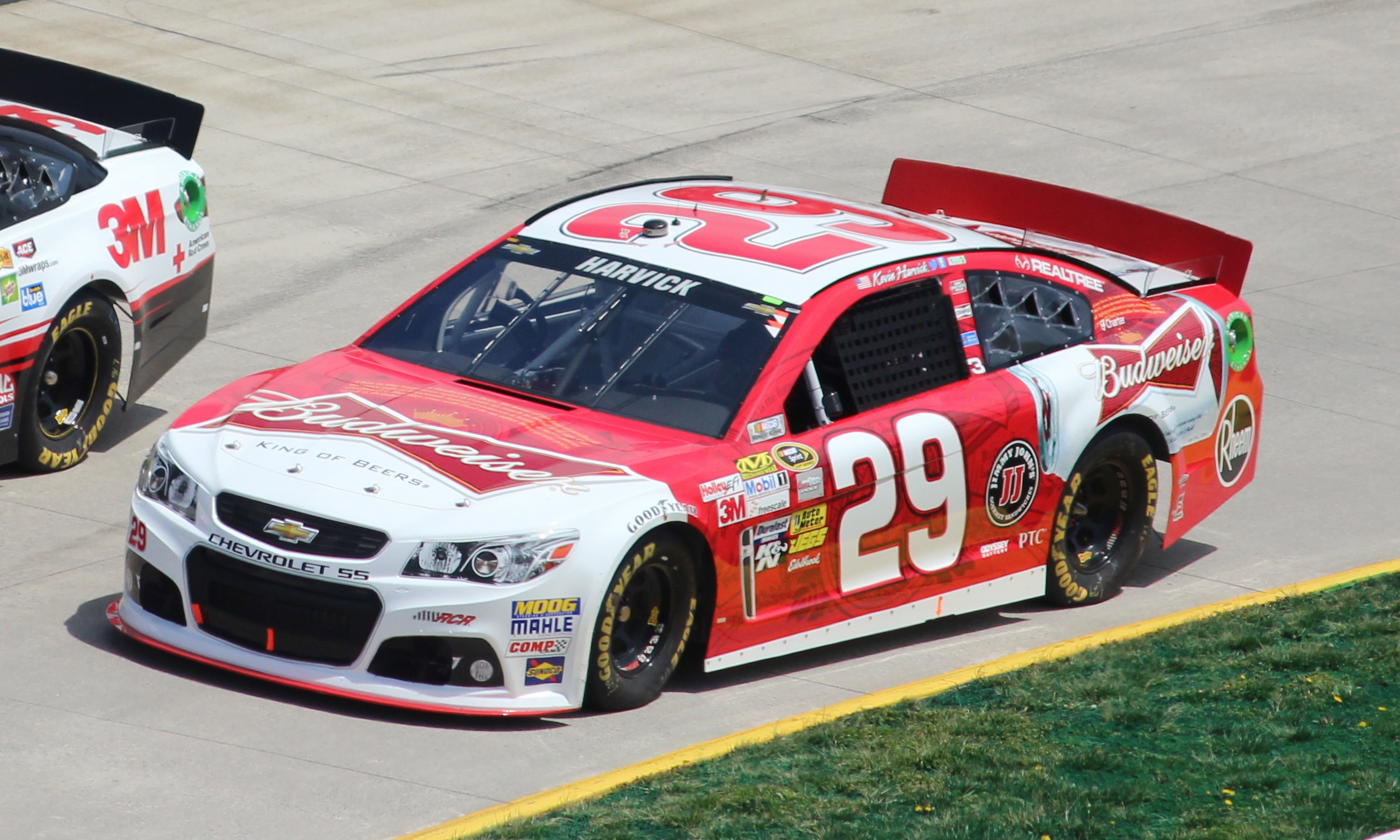
Harvick competing in the 2013 STP Gas Booster 500 at Martinsville Speedway.

=== 2013: Final season at RCR ===
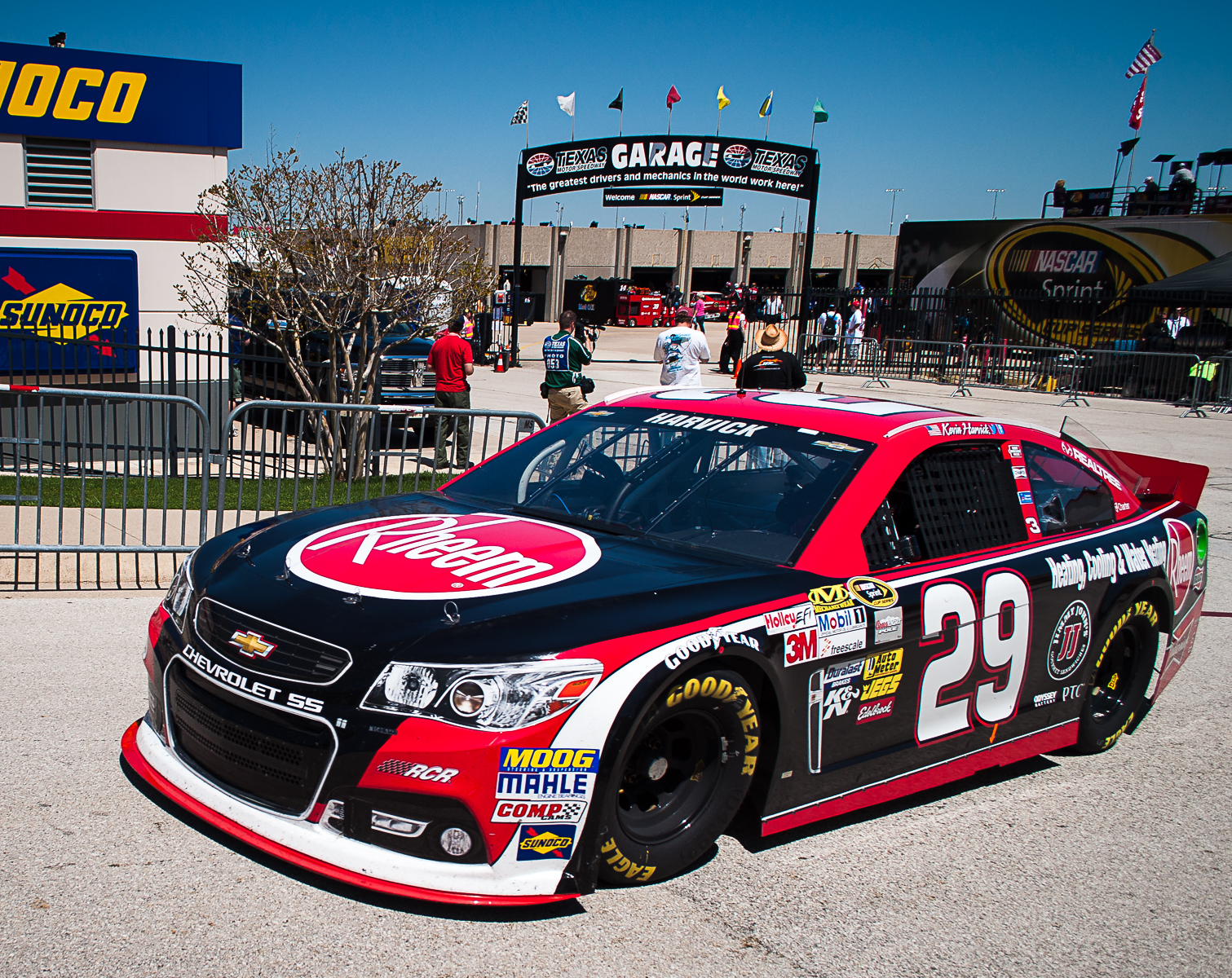
Harvick's car at Texas in 2013.

In 2013 at Daytona, Harvick dodged a practice wreck in the last session of practice, and the same in the Sprint Unlimited. Later, he would go on and tie Tony Stewart's and Dale Jarrett's record for wins in the Clash/Shootout/Unlimited. He also won his Budweiser Duel. He was caught up in a crash on lap 35 of the Daytona 500 and finished 41st. Harvick won his first race of the season at the 2013 Toyota Owners 400, which ended Kyle Busch's four-year winning streak in the spring Richmond race. At the Coca-Cola 600, Harvick took the lead on the last cycle of pit stops and held off Kasey Kahne to win his second 600. Harvick won his first pole position since September 2006 in qualifying for the 2013 Hollywood Casino 400. He dominated the race, leading 138 laps, and survived a wreck-filled event to take his third win of the season. Harvick won his fourth race of the year at the Phoenix race, taking the lead at the white flag when Carl Edwards ran out of gas. His tenure at RCR came to an end the following week at Homestead-Miami with a tenth-place finish. Harvick finished the season third in points again, with four wins, nine top-fives, 21 top-ten finishes, and one pole position.

=== 2014: Stewart–Haas Racing and Cup Series Championship ===
It was officially confirmed on January 22, 2013, that Harvick would be switching teams and joining Stewart–Haas for the 2014 season. Harvick and Childress said the parting was mutual and that it was time for Harvick to move on. Stewart–Haas Racing did not confirm what sponsor or number Harvick would be given. During the official reports, it was reported, but not officially told, that Budweiser was interested in staying with Harvick. On July 12, 2013, it was confirmed that Harvick would drive the No. 4 Chevrolet, and would replace Ryan Newman, who parted ways with Stewart–Haas Racing at the end of the season. Harvick retained Budweiser as his primary sponsor for 21 races, with Jimmy John's sponsoring the remaining races for the 2014 season. In October, it was announced that Harvick would also run a partial schedule in the Nationwide Series in 2014, competing in a minimum of twelve races for JR Motorsports. Despite a second-place finish in his Budweiser Duel in a photo finish against Matt Kenseth and Kasey Kahne, Harvick failed post-race inspection, and his Duel finish was disallowed. As a result, Harvick started the Daytona 500 in 38th, getting in the 500 on a Provisional. Harvick ran up front during the Daytona 500, but was caught up in a last-lap crash leaving turn four, and finished in the thirteenth position.

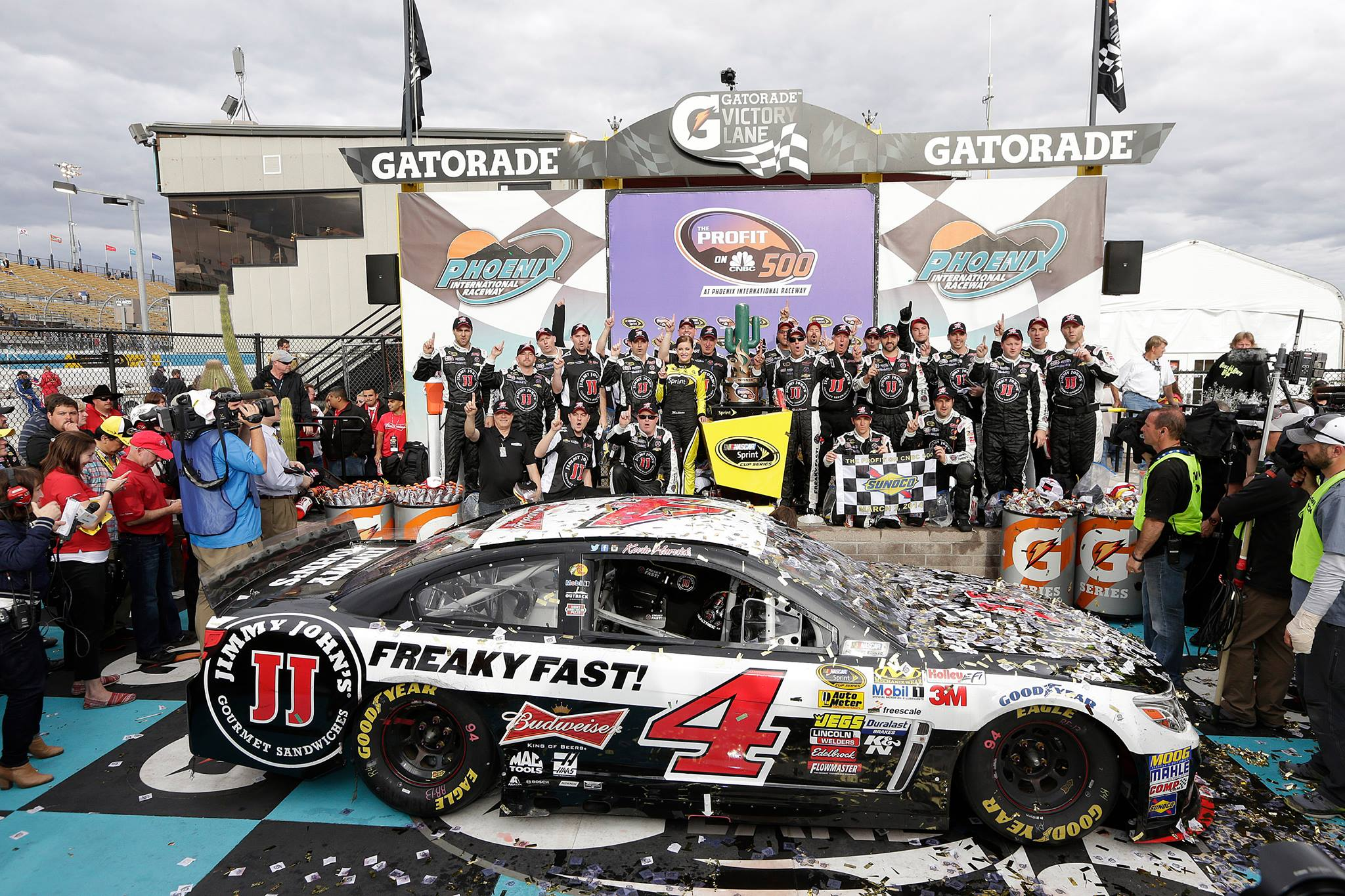
Harvick in victory lane after winning the 2014 The Profit on CNBC 500

The following week at Phoenix, Harvick started 13th and dominated the race, leading 224 of 312 laps, holding off Dale Earnhardt Jr. and Brad Keselowski over the final seven laps to win. This was Harvick's first win for Stewart–Haas Racing and snapped a tie with Jimmie Johnson for most all-time wins at Phoenix.

However, following Phoenix came a bizarre five-race stretch in which Harvick finished 36th or worse four times, due to a hub failure at Las Vegas (41st), a cut oil line at Bristol (39th), a blown tire at Auto Club (36th), and an engine failure at Texas (42nd) – each time squandering one of the fastest cars on the track, as well as leading the most laps.

At Darlington, Harvick dominated the Bojangles' Southern 500 and overtook Dale Earnhardt Jr. on the final lap to win his second race for Stewart–Haas Racing. Harvick almost won the Coca-Cola 600 for the third time in four years, but a poor pit stop with 250 laps left cost him the race. He recovered to score a second-place finish but finished 5.55 seconds behind Jimmie Johnson.

Harvick won the pole, both at Michigan and Indianapolis. In the Irwin Tools Night Race, Harvick controlled the race early. His race, however, turned for the worse when Harvick was later penalized by NASCAR for speeding on pit road, ensuring an 11th-place finish. During the Chase, now using an elimination format, Harvick went on to win the Bank of America 500 at Charlotte, giving him his third win of the season and ensuring his advancement to the next round.

At Texas Motor Speedway, Harvick got a second-place finish but started controversy after instigating a fight between Jeff Gordon and Brad Keselowski on pit road immediately following the race.

At Phoenix, Harvick won the race and swept both 2014 races at Phoenix, allowing him to transfer into the final round of the Chase at Homestead.

At Homestead–Miami Speedway, Harvick was consistent all day long, occasionally battling with Jeff Gordon for the lead. After a late caution, Harvick decided to pit with four tires. Rebounding after restarting outside the top ten, Harvick managed to reach the top five when another caution occurred. Harvick took the lead away from Denny Hamlin, and in the end, held off fellow championship contender Ryan Newman to win the Ford Ecoboost 400 and the Sprint Cup Championship by one position over Newman.

=== 2015 ===
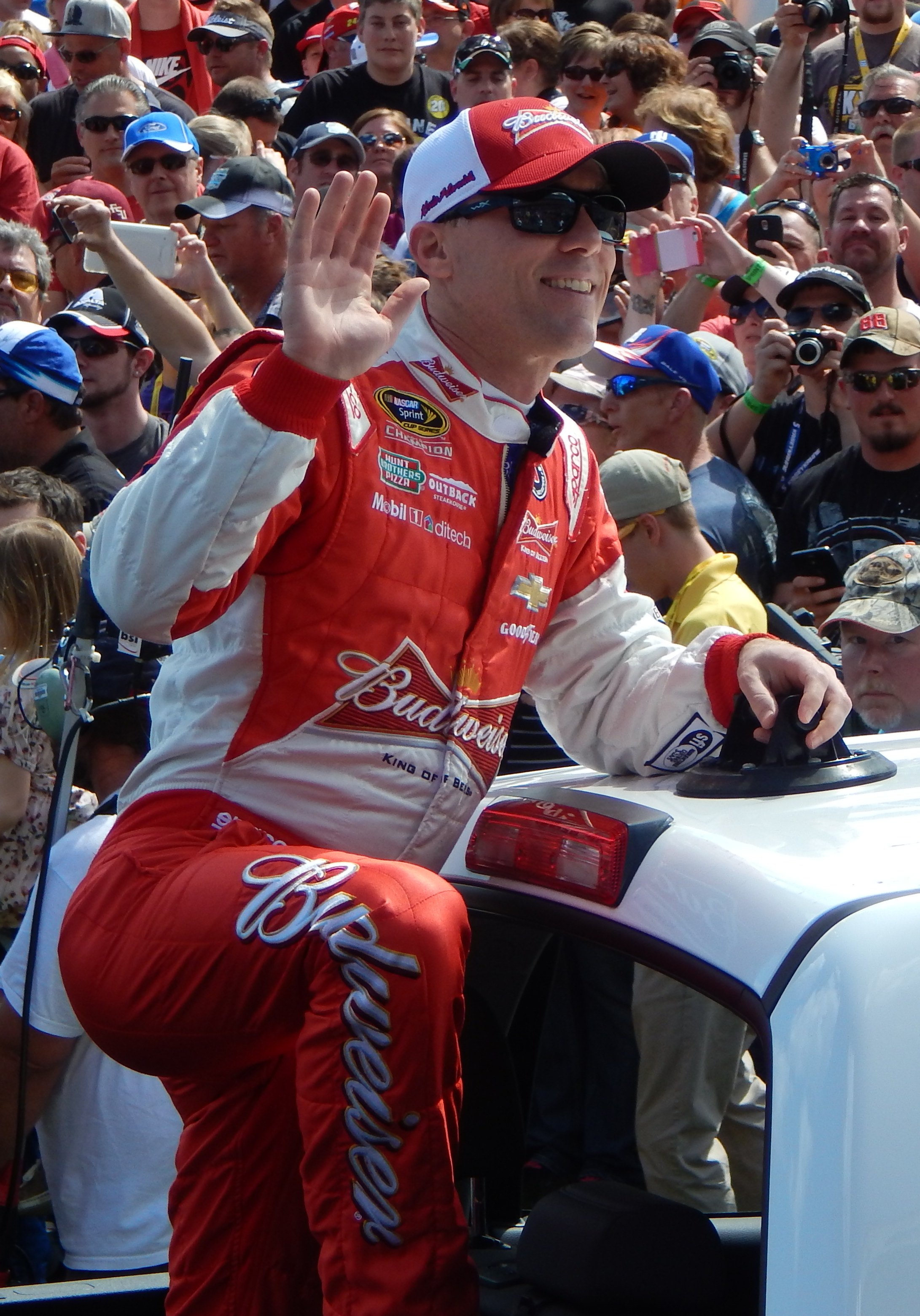
Harvick at Daytona in 2015

In the Sprint Unlimited, Harvick scored an 11th-place finish despite receiving minor damage to his car from a wreck early in the race.

Harvick started the season by finishing second in the Daytona 500. At Las Vegas, Harvick held off Martin Truex Jr. to win his first race of the season. Harvick won again the next week for his fourth straight win at Phoenix and a record seventh win at the track overall. At Auto Club, Harvick managed to finish second, this time to Brad Keselowski. This brought his streak of top-two finishes to eight races overall. It appeared Harvick was on track to tie Richard Petty for most straight top-two finishes, but this streak came to an end with an eighth-place finish at Martinsville.

Harvick then went on to collect four straight Top 10 finishes at Daytona, Kentucky, New Hampshire, and Indianapolis. In the first race of the Chase at Chicagoland, Harvick finished 42nd after getting a flat tire and spinning into the wall due to contact with Jimmie Johnson a few laps earlier on a restart. A confrontation took place after Harvick met with Johnson and lightly punched him in the chest. Harvick dominated next week at Loudon, leading 216 of 300 laps. However, he ran out of gas, allowing Matt Kenseth to win. Harvick finished 21st, putting him in danger of being eliminated from the Chase. The following week at Dover International Speedway, Harvick dominated a majority of the race to earn the third win of the season, leading 351 of 400 laps in the process. That win allowed Harvick to clinch a spot in the next round of the Chase, after narrowly avoiding being eliminated.

In the final race of the Round of 12 at Talladega, Harvick was again in a tough situation. During a green-white-checker restart, Harvick's car was unable to accelerate, which triggered a multi-car wreck. Due to the caution being displayed quickly after the leaders crossed the line, the race was considered official, and Joey Logano was declared the winner. Denny Hamlin, who was competing with Harvick for a spot in the next round, was caught up in the wreck and was eliminated from the Chase. Harvick managed to avoid the wreck and finished fifteenth, advancing him to the next round in the Chase. Trevor Bayne, who was hit in the quarter panel by Harvick, which triggered the wreck, accused him of intentionally spinning him out to secure a spot in the next round. Kevin Harvick and his crew chief, Rodney Childers, claimed that they had tried to move out of the way during the restart, knowing that their engine was failing. In the first race of the Round of 8, Harvick finished eighth at Martinsville. The next week at Texas, he managed to finish third, despite having a faulty shifter which forced him to drive with one hand for the last several laps.

At Homestead, Harvick came up one spot short of the championship, finishing second in the race and the championship to Kyle Busch. With three laps to go, Harvick was closing in on Busch but ran out of time, finishing second to him by 1.5 seconds.

Despite his second-place finish in the championship, Harvick had led the point standings for much of the regular season from the third race of the season at Las Vegas to the Federated Auto Parts 400 at Richmond (a span of 24 races). After the latter race, he fell to fourth in the standings, allowing Johnson to take over in the top spot. He then fell to fifteenth (eleven positions back) after the Chicagoland race as Matt Kenseth took over the points lead. After the fall Martinsville race, Harvick went back up to fourth in the standings. When the fall Phoenix race was shortened due to rain, Harvick retook the points lead.

=== 2016 ===
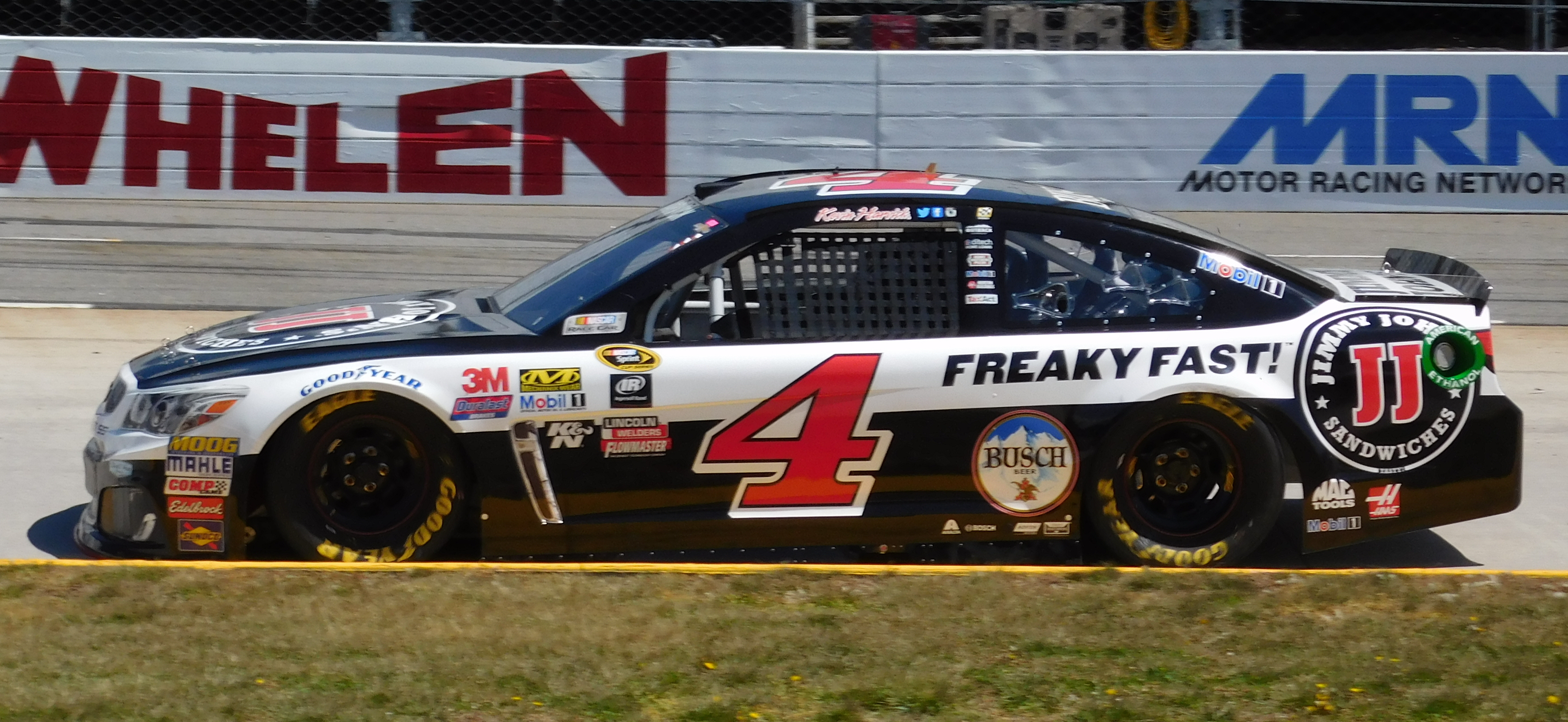
Harvick's No. 4 at Martinsville Speedway in 2016

In the 2016 Daytona 500, Harvick stayed upfront for a majority of the race and would end up finishing 4th. Harvick would earn his first win of the season at Phoenix by beating Carl Edwards in a photo finish by a margin of 0.10, the closest finish in the track's history. The win was Harvick's eighth win at Phoenix.

Over the next several weeks, Harvick finished consistently in the top ten. His first DNF of the season would soon come at Daytona, where he was involved in a big accident on lap 90. Another rough race would come five weeks later at Watkins Glen, due to heavy contact from David Ragan after spinning out with seven laps to go. The next week, Harvick would nab his second win of the season at Bristol, where he held off Ricky Stenhouse Jr. for the last fifty laps of the race.

In the first race of the Chase for the Sprint Cup at Chicagoland, Harvick would start at the rear of the field due to unapproved body modifications, but quickly moved back up to the front within thirty laps. He would be put a lap down due to an untimely caution while Harvick was on pit road because he did not beat the leader, Martin Truex Jr., to the start-finish line. He never got back on the lead lap for the remainder of the race and ultimately finished twentieth. Harvick's third win of the season would come the very next week at Loudon, where he passed Matt Kenseth on a late-race restart with seven laps to go. Next week at Dover, Harvick would have a broken track bar and would have to go to the garage, but he was already locked into the next round due to his win at New Hampshire. The next week at Charlotte, Harvick would win the pole and would lead 155 laps before having electrical problems on lap 154 at the same time Joey Logano had a tire problem and hit the wall. Coming into Kansas, Harvick sat twelfth in the Chase standings and would be in a must-win situation to make the Round of 8, but that was no problem for Harvick as he would dominate the race along with Matt Kenseth until Kenseth would fade after tapping the wall. Harvick would lead 267 laps to victory, late in the race, Carl Edwards, would get the lead and lead several laps, but after a few cautions and restarts, Harvick would get back the lead and while Edwards and Kyle Busch would battle hard for second place, Harvick would pull away to get his fourth win of the season, and advance into the Round of 8 in the Chase but he would officially get eliminated in the Round of 8. He would wrap up his 2016 season by winning the pole and finishing third at Homestead-Miami.

=== 2017 ===
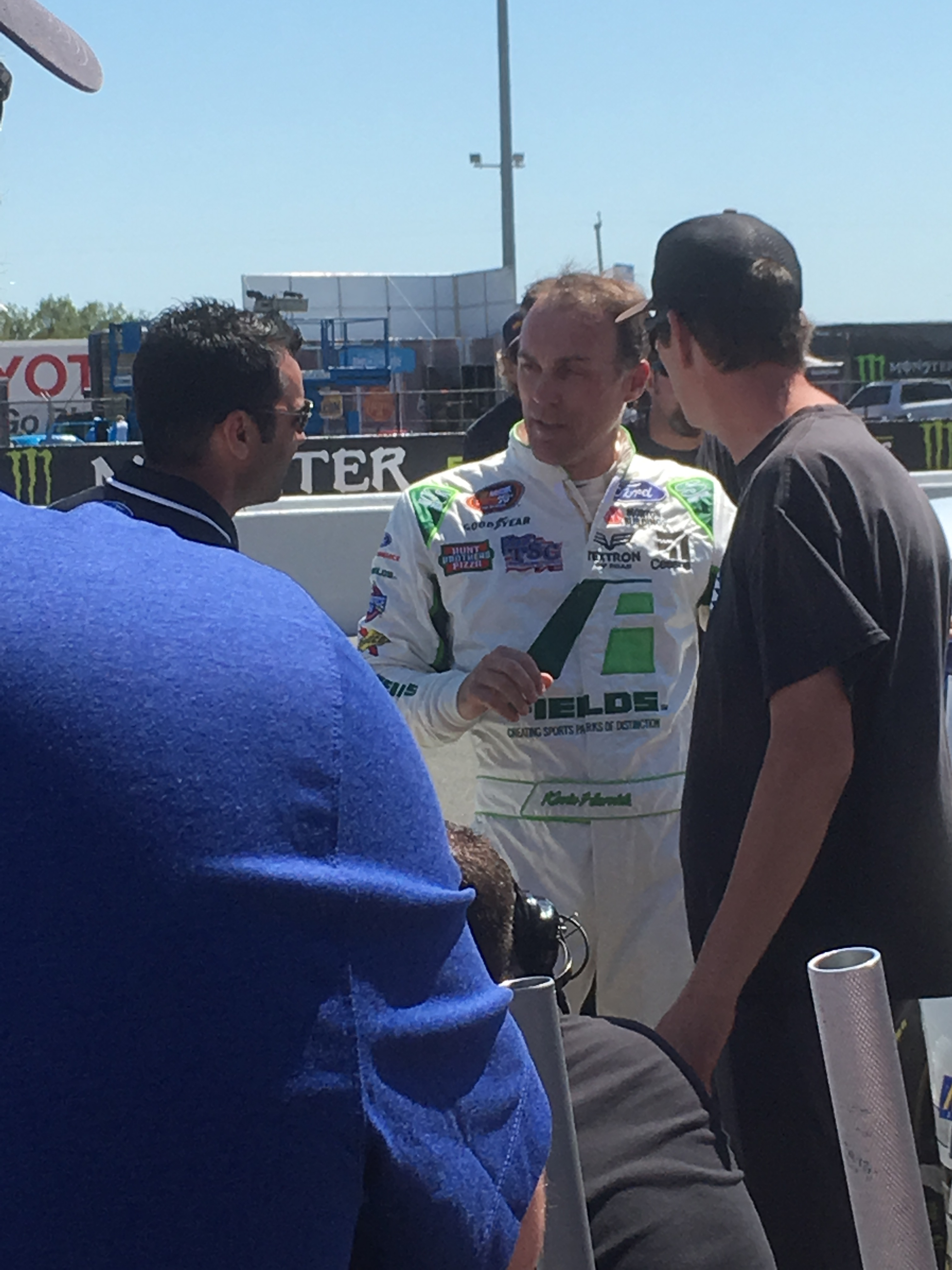
Harvick at the 2017 K&N Pro Series West race at Sonoma Raceway

For 2017, Stewart–Haas switched from Chevrolet to Ford. Harvick went on to win Stage 2 and lead the most laps in the 2017 Daytona 500. A large wreck on lap 129 would hinder Harvick from topping his solid day off, and he would ultimately finish 22nd. Next week at Atlanta, Harvick continued his momentum by capturing the pole position. Once the green flag waved, Harvick held the lead and didn't look back. He would go on to lead 292 out of 325 laps, a race-high for him, and he would also sweep both race stages. With less than twenty to go, Austin Dillon's car received a power failure, setting up a late-race caution. The field would pit, and Harvick would receive a devastating pit road penalty. This put him at the tail end of the longest line and would prevent him from closing out the race and winning yet again. Harvick would only advance up to the ninth position. Despite his disappointing performances, he would lead the points standings heading out of Atlanta due to his stage wins and consistency during the two races.

Harvick raced in the K&N Pro Series West event at Sonoma Raceway, his first race in the series since Iowa Speedway in 2007, driving the No. 4 for Jefferson Pitts Racing. Harvick took the lead from Michael Self on lap 42 to win the race. A day later, he won the Toyota/Save Mart 350 to sweep the weekend, his second-ever road course win, and first at Sonoma. Teammate Clint Bowyer finished second to mark a Stewart–Haas 1–2. During the chase, Harvick struggled during the first round finishing 36th at Loudon and seventeenth at Dover. Though his playoff points and stage points saved him from elimination. The second round fared slightly better for Harvick, though he did suffer a DNF at Talladega; again, his stage points would keep him from elimination. Harvick finished fifth at Martinsville after sliding to the finish after last-lap contact. The following week at Texas, Harvick would win stage 1, lead a total of 35 laps, and win the race. Harvick's win would secure him a spot in the Championship 4 at Homestead. The win was also Harvick's first at Texas, leaving Kentucky and Pocono as the only tracks Harvick has yet to win. The following week at Phoenix, Harvick finished fifth. This marked the first season since 2011 in which Harvick didn't win a race at Phoenix. In the season finale at Homestead, Harvick started strong, leading the championship at one point; however, after hitting some debris and losing the handle of the car, Harvick was unable to run with the leaders Truex and Busch during the final green-flag run. He finished fourth in the race and third in the final standings. With the retirements of Dale Jr. and Matt Kenseth, Harvick and his long-time rival Jimmie Johnson became the oldest full-time drivers in the Cup Series.

=== 2018 ===
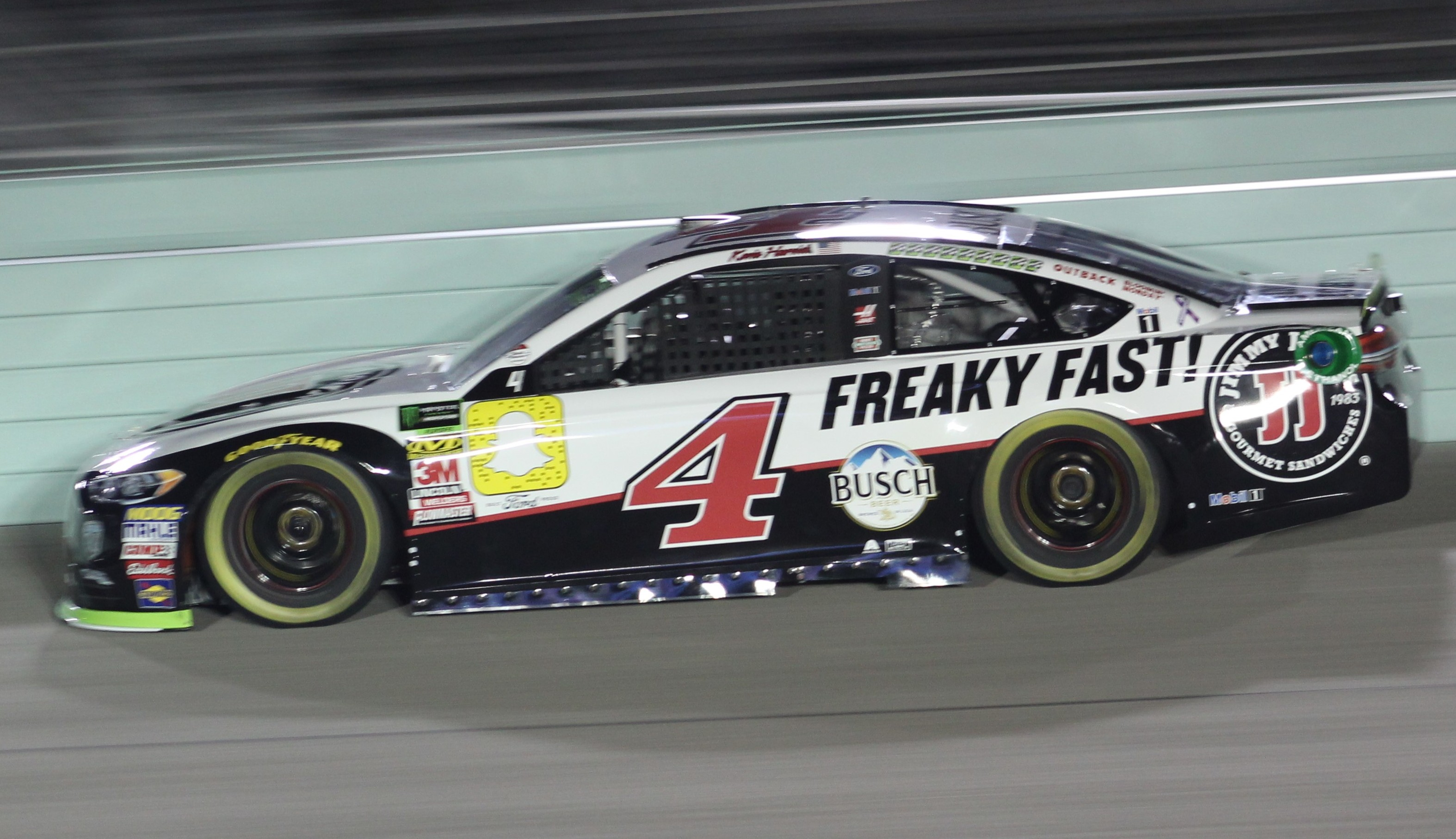
Harvick racing in the 2018 Ford EcoBoost 400 at Homestead–Miami Speedway.

Harvick would start the 2018 season with a DNF at the Daytona 500, after being involved in a crash just halfway through the race finishing 31st, but would earn dominant back-to-back wins at Atlanta (his first since 2001) and Las Vegas. This would be the first time Harvick would earn back-to-back wins since 2015, when he won at Las Vegas and Phoenix. It would also be his one-hundredth career win across NASCAR's top three series. However, his win at Las Vegas would not count toward the playoffs, as he received an L1 penalty for the rear window of the car not being braced at all times. He has docked twenty points, crew chief Childers fined $50,000, and car chief Robert Smith suspended for the next two races. Despite Childers being absent in the Phoenix race and the penalty from last week, Harvick was able to score his fortieth career win and would finally earn three consecutive wins after four previous attempts, for the first time in his career. Coming to California, four consecutive would not work for Harvick, as he was involved in a wreck with Kyle Larson early in the race, and would finish 35th place, nine laps down. He finished fifth at Martinsville, second at Texas, seventh at Bristol, fifth at Richmond, and fourth at Talladega. At Dover, Harvick dominated by leading the most laps and scoring his fourth win of the year. The following week at Kansas, he was again dominant, scoring the pole, finishing second in both stages, and taking the lead with two laps to go to win his fifth race of the season. This tied the most wins for Harvick in a season. Harvick was the first driver to win five of the first 13 races since Jeff Gordon in 1997. A week later in the All-Star Race, Harvick continued his winning streak yet again, winning stages 1 and 3 and holding off Daniel Suárez to win for the first time in eleven years after winning it in 2007, driving the No. 29 car for RCR. Over the next seven races, Harvick would finish outside the top five only twice: at Charlotte after a tire failure, and Daytona after getting caught in an Overtime wreck. At New Hampshire, Harvick stayed in the top 10 for most of the race, and with less than fifteen laps to go, Harvick used the bump and run on Kyle Busch and held onto the lead to get his sixth win of the year, the best in his career. He finished fourth at Pocono and tenth at Watkins Glen. Coming into Michigan, Harvick had finished second six times since winning there in 2010. He won both stages and led 108 laps en route to his seventh win of the season.

In the playoffs, Harvick earned consistent finishes and used playoff points to advance himself toward the Round of 8, where he earned his eighth win of the season at Texas after winning both stages 1 and 2. However, he was penalized forty points and had the win encumbered due to a spoiler infraction post-race, which put him three points above the cut-line heading to Phoenix. Harvick overcame a flat tire during the Phoenix race to secure enough points to make the Championship 4 at Homestead. In the season finale, Harvick ran up front for most of the early part of the race, but his car got loose as the night went on. Harvick found himself in a position to win the race after pit strategy got him the lead in the final stage of the race, but an ill-timed caution cost him the win. Harvick battled for the lead on the final restart but got overtaken by eventual winner Joey Logano. Harvick stated, "We just got beat tonight" after the race. He finished the season third in the points standings, winning a career-high eight races and tying Kyle Busch for the most wins of the year.

=== 2019 ===
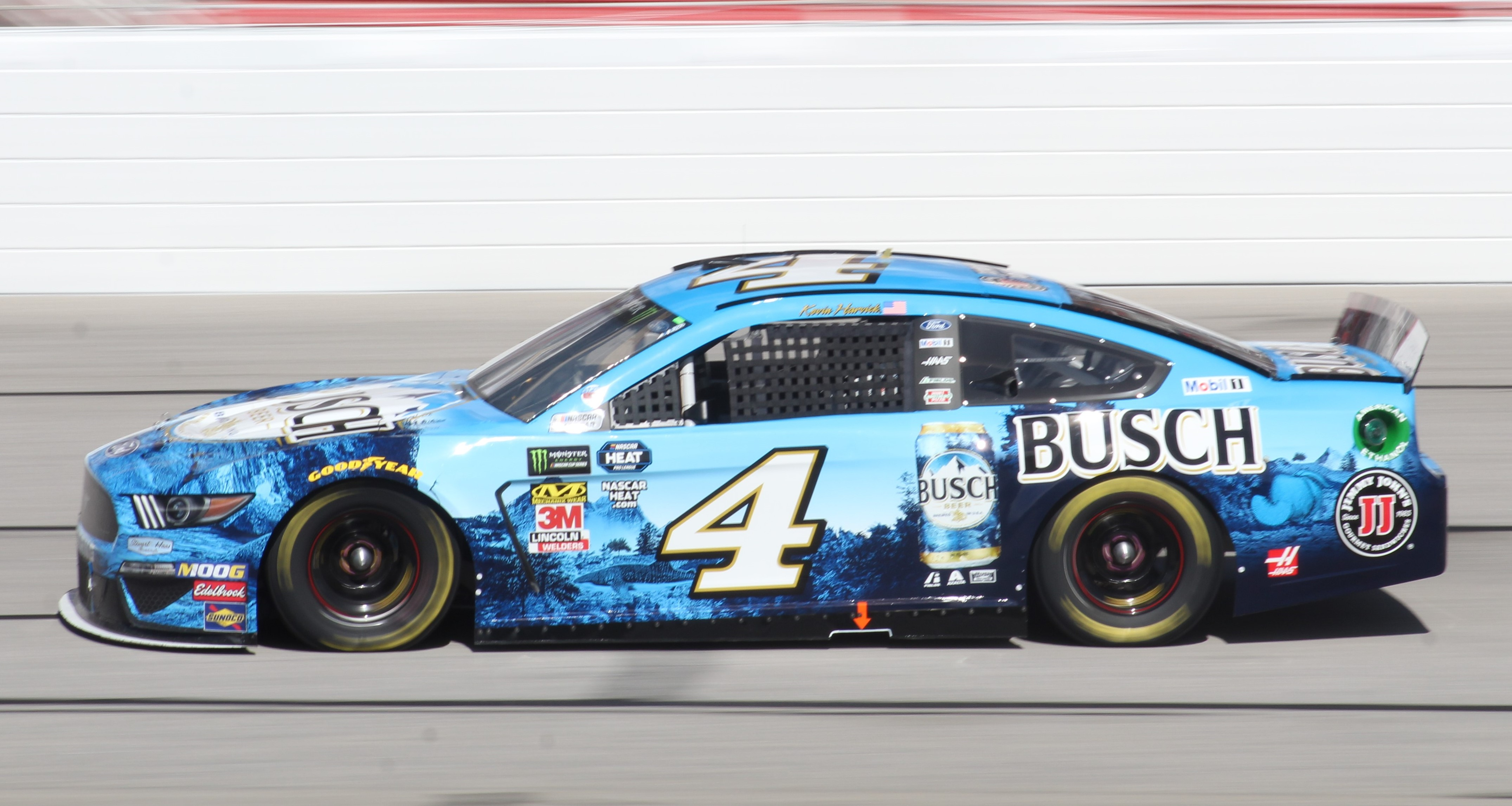
Harvick racing at Atlanta Motor Speedway.

Harvick started his 2019 season by winning Duel 1 of the 2019 Gander RV Duels at Daytona. He finished 26th at the 2019 Daytona 500 after a late crash. Following Daytona, Harvick went on to finish in the top ten six straight times, including three top-fives. Following Texas was an up-and-down stretch that lasted until race #19. At Bristol Motor Speedway, he finished a mediocre thirteenth after getting through traffic. Richmond was not bad as he was consistently in the top-five all night and finished fourth. Things took a hard turn at Talladega, where he earned his second DNF of the season, all on superspeedways. Harvick bounced back with a fourth-place finish at Dover. He got the pole at Kansas and looked as if he was going to win, but a poor stop by his crew members relegated him to finish thirteenth instead. Harvick almost won the All-Star race but finished second behind Kyle Larson. He then finished tenth at the Coca-Cola 600. A loose wheel at Pocono made him suffer a 22nd-place finish. Then in the next two races, he finished inside the top seven. He then finished outside the top ten in the next three races. At Chicagoland, Harvick did well in both stages, but a loose wheel got him to finish a mediocre 14th-place finish. Then next weekend, he finished 29th after getting collected in the Big One, but still was able to run at the finish line driving his wrecked car. Then, Kentucky was worse as he finished 22nd again. Heading into New Hampshire, Harvick had decent numbers but was still winless throughout the season after nineteen races. Then, in the next seven races, he finished in the top seven in six races. His only finish outside the top-ten was at Bristol as he suffered a DNF thanks to a transmission problem. He added this great momentum with wins at New Hampshire, Michigan, and Indianapolis. His Playoffs were also consistent, as in the Round of 16, he finished second at Las Vegas, seventh at Richmond, and finished third at the Charlotte Roval to advance to the Round of 12, and his average finish during those three races in the Round of 16 was a 4.0 during that stretch. At Talladega, Harvick made his 677th career start in the Cup Series, one more than the total career starts of Dale Earnhardt. His worst finish during the Playoffs was seventeenth at Talladega, after getting collected in the Big One, but once again was able to finish the race. He scored his fourth win of the season at Texas to make his fifth appearance in the Championship 4 in the last six years. He went on to finish third in the standings for the third consecutive season after finishing fourth at Homestead.

=== 2020: Regular Season Champion ===
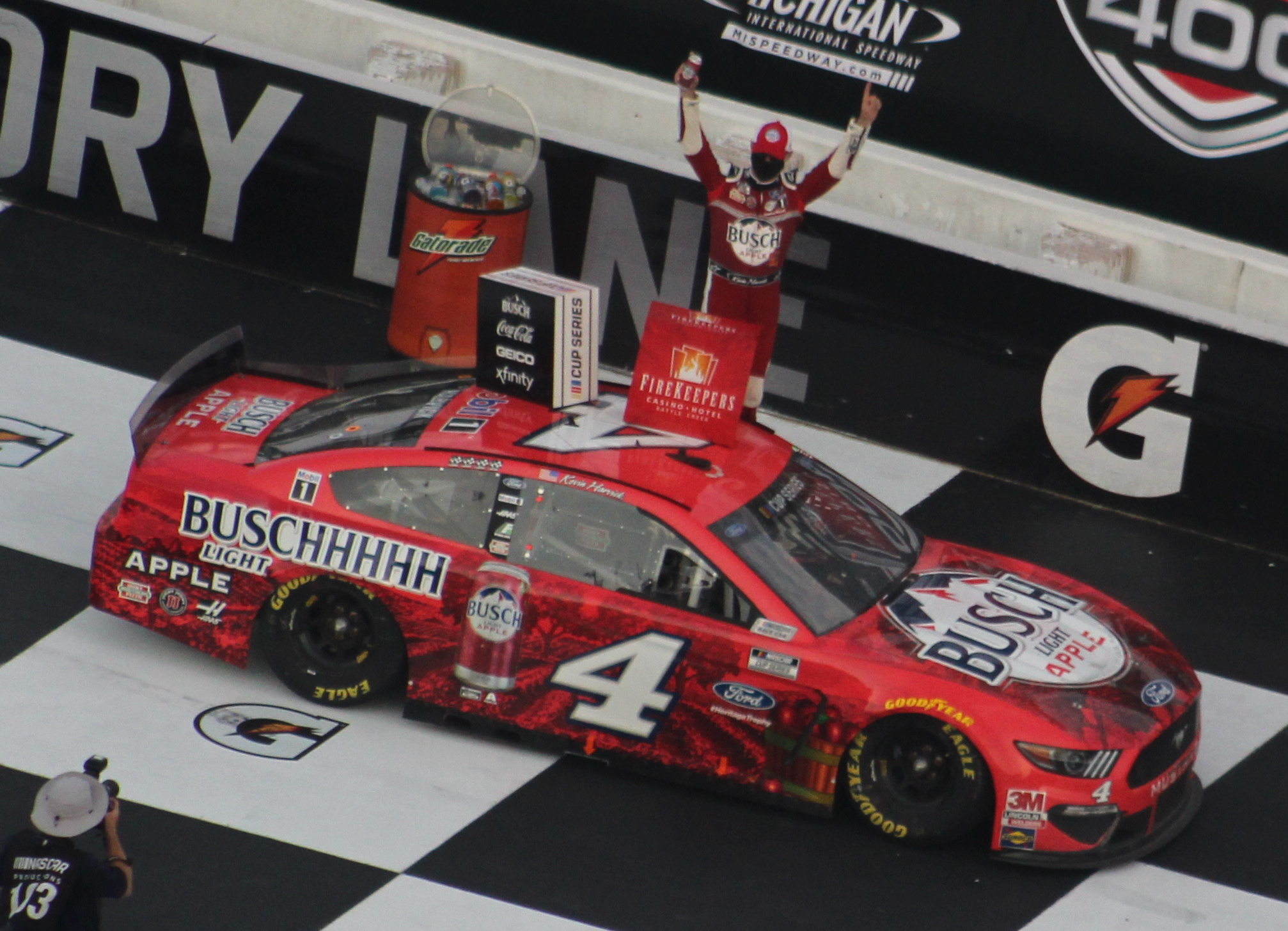
Harvick celebrating after winning the 2020 FireKeepers Casino 400

To start the 2020 season, Harvick finished fourth in Duel 2 of the Bluegreen Vacations Duels at Daytona. Despite sustaining minor damage, he finished fifth at the Daytona 500, his first top-five in the race since 2016. He stayed consistently in the top-ten at Las Vegas, Fontana, and Phoenix before the season was halted due to the COVID-19 pandemic.

On February 22, Harvick and Camping World CEO Marcus Lemonis offered a US$100,000 reward to any full-time Cup Series driver who can beat Kyle Busch in the Truck Series. Corey LaJoie, Austin Dillon, Landon Cassill, and Timmy Hill were among those who showed interest in the challenge. Chase Elliott ultimately took up the bounty and won it in the Truck Series' first race back from the season pause at Charlotte.

When racing resumed on May 17, Harvick scored his fiftieth career win at The Real Heroes 400 at Darlington. The win allowed him to surpass his car owner Tony Stewart to become the 12th winningest driver in Cup Series history. Further victories came during the summer in the Folds of Honor QuikTrip 500 at Atlanta (where he celebrated in a similar manner to his 2001 victory there), the Pocono Organics 325 at Pocono (his first win at the track), the Brickyard 400 at Indianapolis (after fellow championship contender Denny Hamlin blew a tire late), and a sweep of the Michigan doubleheader (becoming the first driver to win Cup races on back-to-back days since Richard Petty in 1971).

Following his seventh win of the season in the second Drydene 311 at Dover International Speedway, Harvick clinched the regular-season championship.

After a twentieth place finish at Daytona, Harvick opened the first round of the playoffs on a high note by holding off Austin Dillon to win his second Southern 500 and outdueled Kyle Busch two weeks later to win the Bristol Night Race for the second time in his career, becoming the first driver to win at least nine times in a season since Carl Edwards in 2008. Despite these achievements, Harvick was eliminated in the Round of 8 after finishing seventeenth at Martinsville. He finished fifth in the points standings and went the entire season without a DNF for only the fourth time in his career.

=== 2021: Fourth winless season and feud with Chase Elliott ===
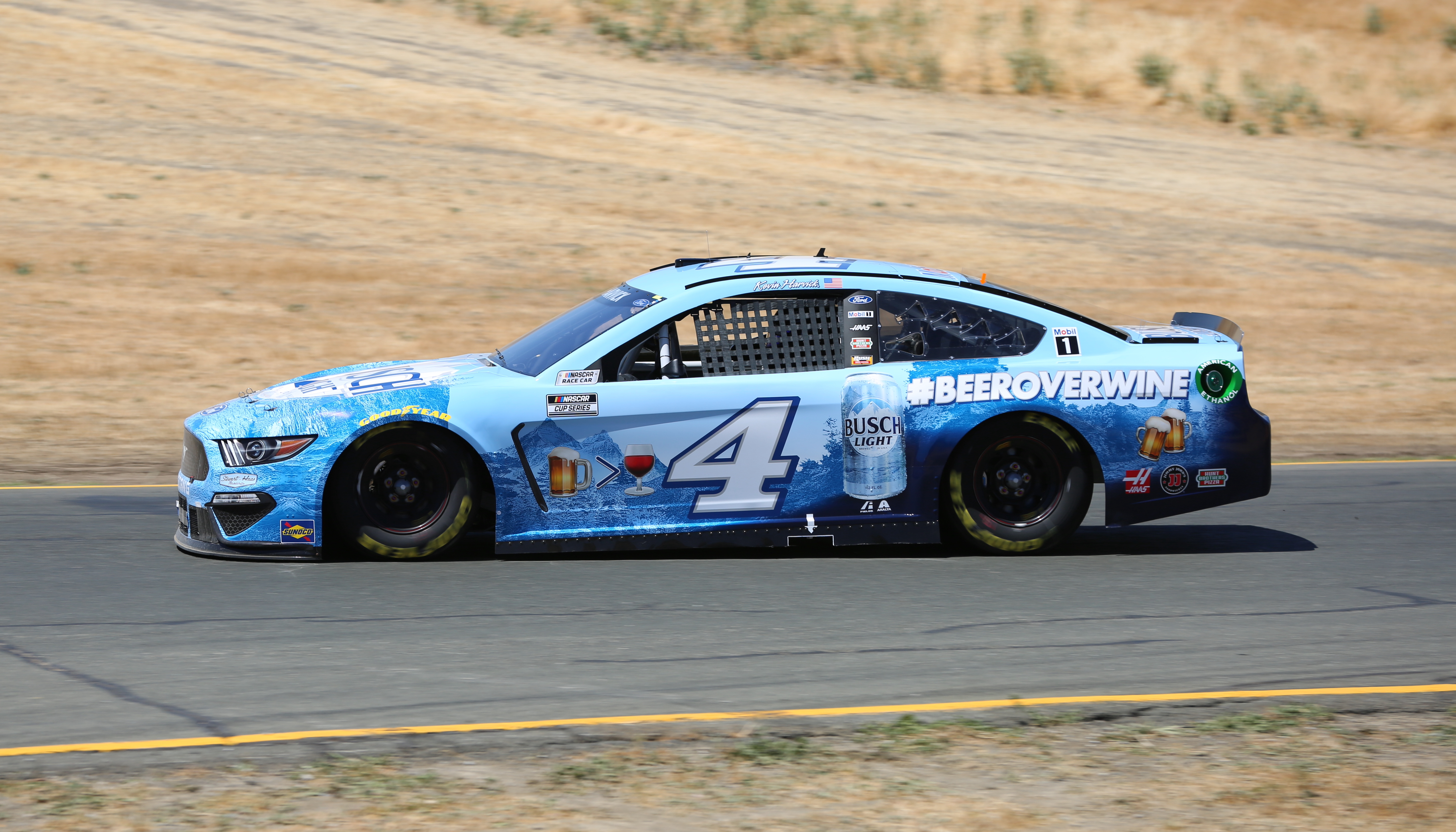
Harvick racing at Sonoma Raceway in 2021

Harvick began the 2021 Cup season with three consecutive top-ten finishes and was one of two drivers to do that, the other being Michael McDowell. His streak ended in the fourth race at Las Vegas when he finished twentieth after starting on the pole. Harvick finished 37th at the inaugural Circuit of the Americas race after Bubba Wallace collided with him under rainy conditions, sustaining his first DNF since the 2019 Bass Pro Shops NRA Night Race. He, later on, criticized NASCAR for allowing the race to proceed with poor visibility. Despite scoring no wins for the first time since 2009, Harvick managed to make the playoffs with his consistency.

In March, Harvick returned to the Truck Series for the first time since 2015 when he joined David Gilliland Racing to drive their No. 17 in the Bristol dirt race. Stewart–Haas also brought back their second Xfinity car for Harvick to run three road course races at Circuit of the Americas, Road America, and the Indianapolis Road Course, all of which were new to the Cup Series schedule that year. He ended up in the Nos. 5 and 99 for B. J. McLeod Motorsports in collaboration with Stewart–Haas Racing.

Despite lacking the bonus points of the other playoff contenders, Harvick stayed consistent enough to make it to the Round of 12. At the Bristol Night Race, he tangled with Chase Elliott, causing the latter to fall out of contention after cutting a tire. Harvick led the race on the closing laps, but a lapped Elliott created enough traffic to slow down Harvick, allowing Kyle Larson to overtake him for the win. This resulted in a heated verbal confrontation between Harvick and Elliott after the race. Neither driver was reprimanded by NASCAR. During the Charlotte Roval race, Harvick bumped Elliott and sent him to the wall with rear-end damage. Harvick later experienced brake failure and crashed head-on to the first turn wall. As a result, he was eliminated from the Round of 12, the earliest elimination from Playoff contention in his career. Despite this and going winless for the first time since 2009, he once again finished fifth in the final standings.

=== 2022: Highs and lows with the Next-Gen ===
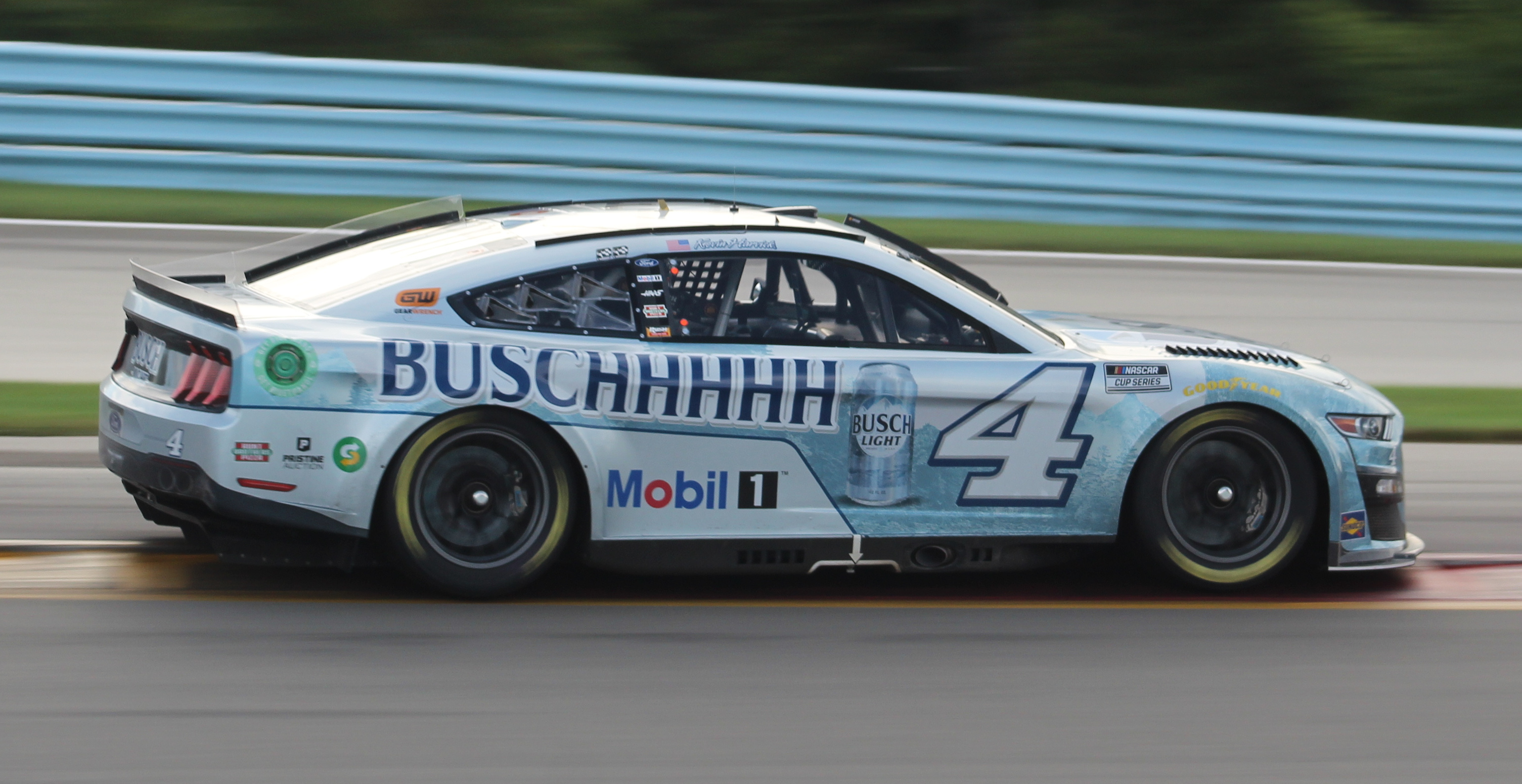
Harvick's No. 4 car at Watkins Glen International in 2022

Harvick began the 2022 season with a 30th-place finish at the 2022 Daytona 500. Aside from four DNFs, he stayed consistent with his finishes until he won at Michigan, breaking a 65-race drought to become the fifteenth different winner in the season. Harvick then scored his sixtieth, and final, career victory at Richmond a week later. At the Southern 500, Harvick finished 33rd after his car caught fire, which resulted in being relegated to 16th and last in the Playoff standings. The following week at Kansas, Harvick slammed the wall on lap 33 after Ross Chastain made contact with Bubba Wallace, resulting in Harvick's third consecutive DNF for the first time in his career. Harvick was eliminated in the Round of 16 after finishing tenth and being in a must-win situation at the Bristol night race. On October 5, Childers was suspended for four races and fined US$100,000 for an L2 Penalty during post-race inspection after the Talladega playoff race. The penalty came under Sections 14.1 (vehicle assembly) and 14.5 (body) in the NASCAR Rule Book, both of which pertain to the body and overall vehicle assembly rules surrounding modification of a single-source supplied part. In addition, the No. 4 team was docked one hundred driver and owner points. Harvick finished the season 15th in the points standings, his first points finish outside the top 10 since 2009.

=== 2023: Final full-time season ===
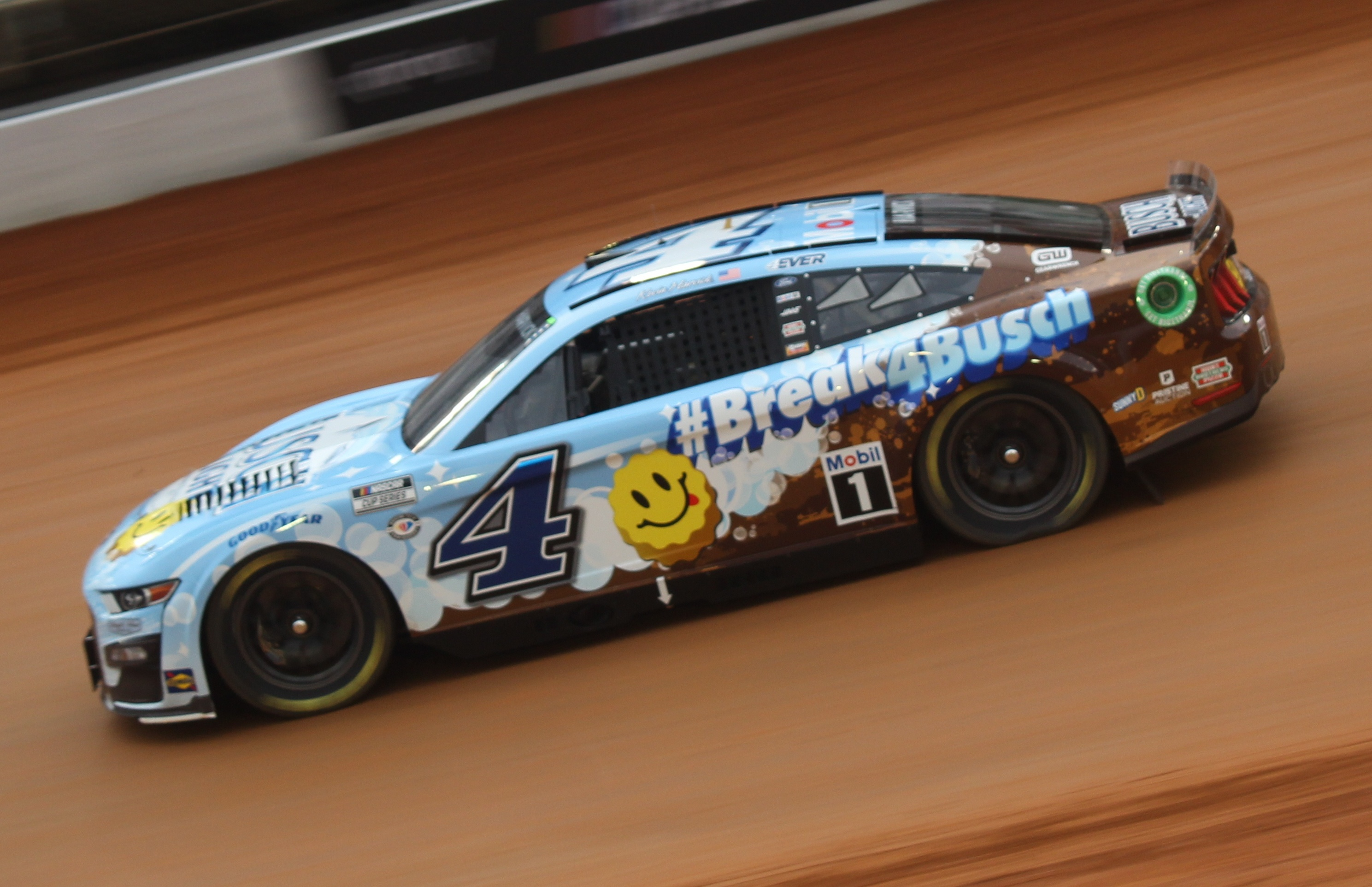
Harvick racing at Bristol Motor Speedway in 2023

On January 12, 2023, Harvick announced he would retire at the end of the 2023 season. He started the season with a twelfth place finish at the 2023 Daytona 500. He then followed up by getting three consecutive top-tens, almost winning at Phoenix for his tenth time when a caution forced a green-white-checkered finish, in which he finished fifth. In his final appearance at the All-Star Race, Harvick's car used the No. 29 and a throwback paint scheme honoring his first career win at Atlanta in 2001. Despite not winning a race, Harvick stayed consistent enough to make the playoffs on his final season. He was eliminated at the conclusion of the Round of 16. At Talladega, Harvick finished second to Ryan Blaney, but was later disqualified after post-race inspection discovered a violation involving the car's windshield fasteners. Harvick finished his Cup Series career with a seventh place finish at Phoenix and 13th in the points standings.

=== 2024 ===
On April 28, 2024, it was announced that Harvick would be the standby driver for Kyle Larson at North Wilkesboro Speedway for the 2024 NASCAR All-Star race. Harvick took part in practice and qualifying.

== Other racing ==
=== American Canadian Tour and ARCA Bondo/Mar-Hyde Series ===
On July 21, 2008, Harvick won $37,300 at the 35th annual TD Bank 250 presented by New England Dodge Dealers in Oxford, Maine. Harvick defeated tour regulars, Glen Luce and Joey Polewarczyk Jr., to become the first active NASCAR Sprint Cup Series driver to win the 250. The event is traditionally one of New England's major short track races. Since his 1998 West Series championship, he has competed in four races with one win. He also made two starts in the ARCA Bondo/Mar-Hyde Series in 1999 for Childress in the No. 20 Invinca-Shields/Realtree Chevrolet, finishing in the top-five both times.

=== CARS Tour ===
On January 9, 2023, a consortium consisting of Kevin Harvick Incorporated, DEJ Management, Jeff Burton Autosports, Inc., and Trackhouse Racing Team purchased the CARS Tour.

== Broadcasting career ==
On January 25, 2015, it was reported that Harvick, along with Jeff Gordon, Brad Keselowski, and Danica Patrick, would serve as a rotating analyst for Xfinity Series races with NASCAR on Fox. Harvick was the first of the four to commentate, starting at Daytona; he also worked at Las Vegas, Dover, and the Truck Series race at Talladega.

In June 2017, Harvick was the play-by-play commentator for the Fox NASCAR broadcast of the Xfinity race at Pocono as part of a Cup drivers-only coverage, he worked alongside Joey Logano and Clint Bowyer in the broadcast booth. Fox brought back the Drivers Only broadcast in 2018 at Talladega and 2019 at Charlotte in May, and the trio reprised their roles in the booth both years.

Harvick was scheduled to be later into Fox's guest analysts in 2020, but all assignments and "Drivers Only" were cancelled because of restrictions that prevented Fox from hosting broadcasts on-site after the March Phoenix round. However, in 2021, Harvick was included in the lineup of guest analysts, and he served as a color commentator at Darlington in May.

On February 5, 2023, Fox Sports and Harvick announced that he would be joining the Fox NASCAR broadcast booth in 2024, joining Mike Joy and former RCR and SHR teammate Clint Bowyer starting in 2024. Harvick serves as the Craftsman Truck Series' play-by-play commentator for Drivers Only and is, on occasion, a backup play-by-play commentator.

In February 2024, Harvick was announced as the host of new podcast style series produced by Fox Sports titled "Kevin Harvick's Happy Hour" that is focused on NASCAR coverage that is also hosted by Kaitlyn Vincie and Mamba Smith that is currently ongoing. In February 2026, Fox Sports announced that Harvick would serve as host alongside Will Buxton on an additional motorsports-focused podcast series named after the former TV network Speed.

== Personal life ==
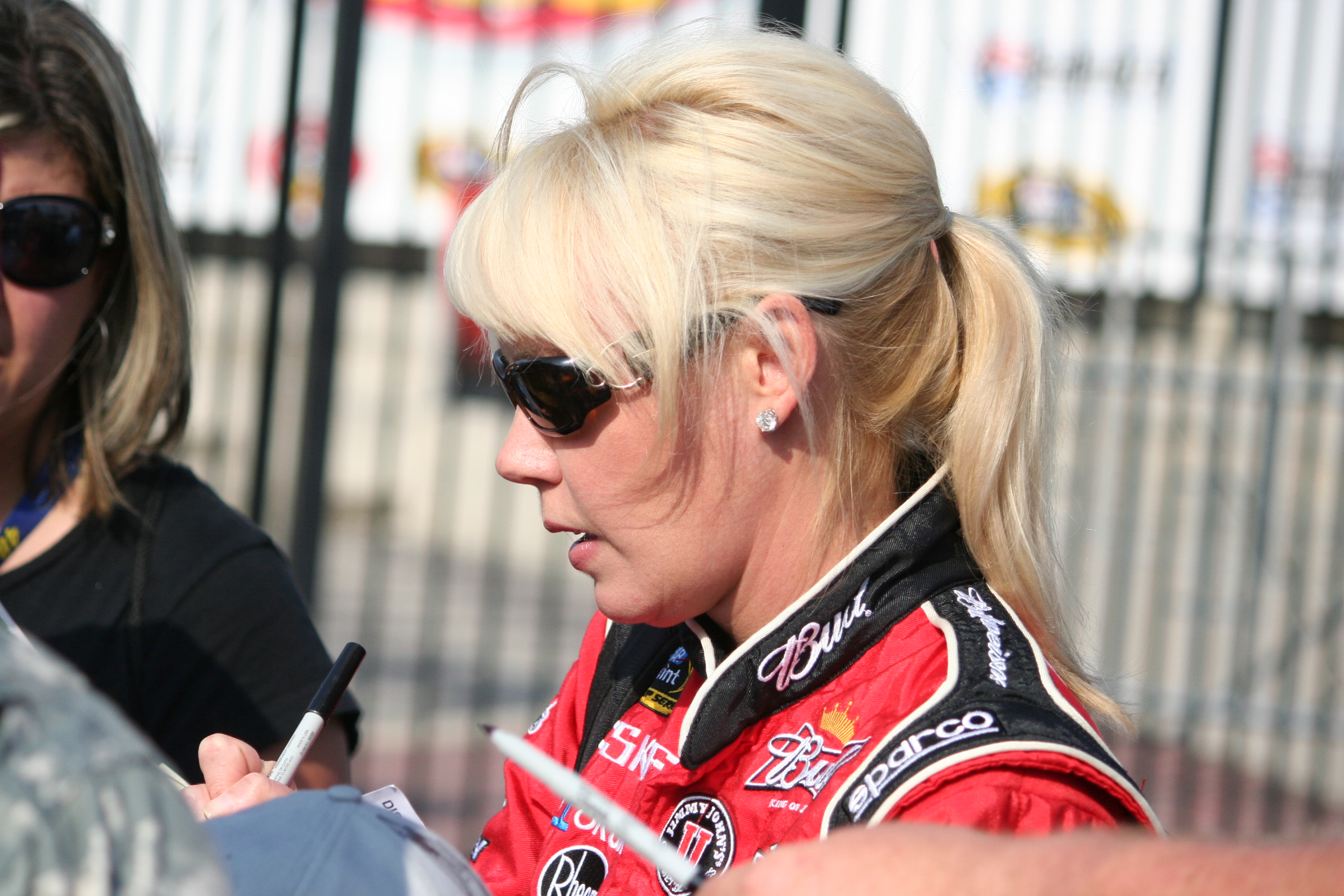
DeLana Harvick at Charlotte Motor Speedway in May 2011.

Harvick married DeLana (Linville) Harvick on February 28, 2001, in Las Vegas, Nevada, shortly after his Cup Series debut. They had met the previous year at Michigan International Speedway, where at the time she was working in public relations for fellow driver Randy LaJoie. DeLana had worked in a similar capacity for Jeff Gordon previously and had even dabbled in race driving herself. DeLana is an active participant in Harvick's career, co-owning and working with KHI Management LLC, as well as frequently appearing on Harvick's pit box during Cup races.

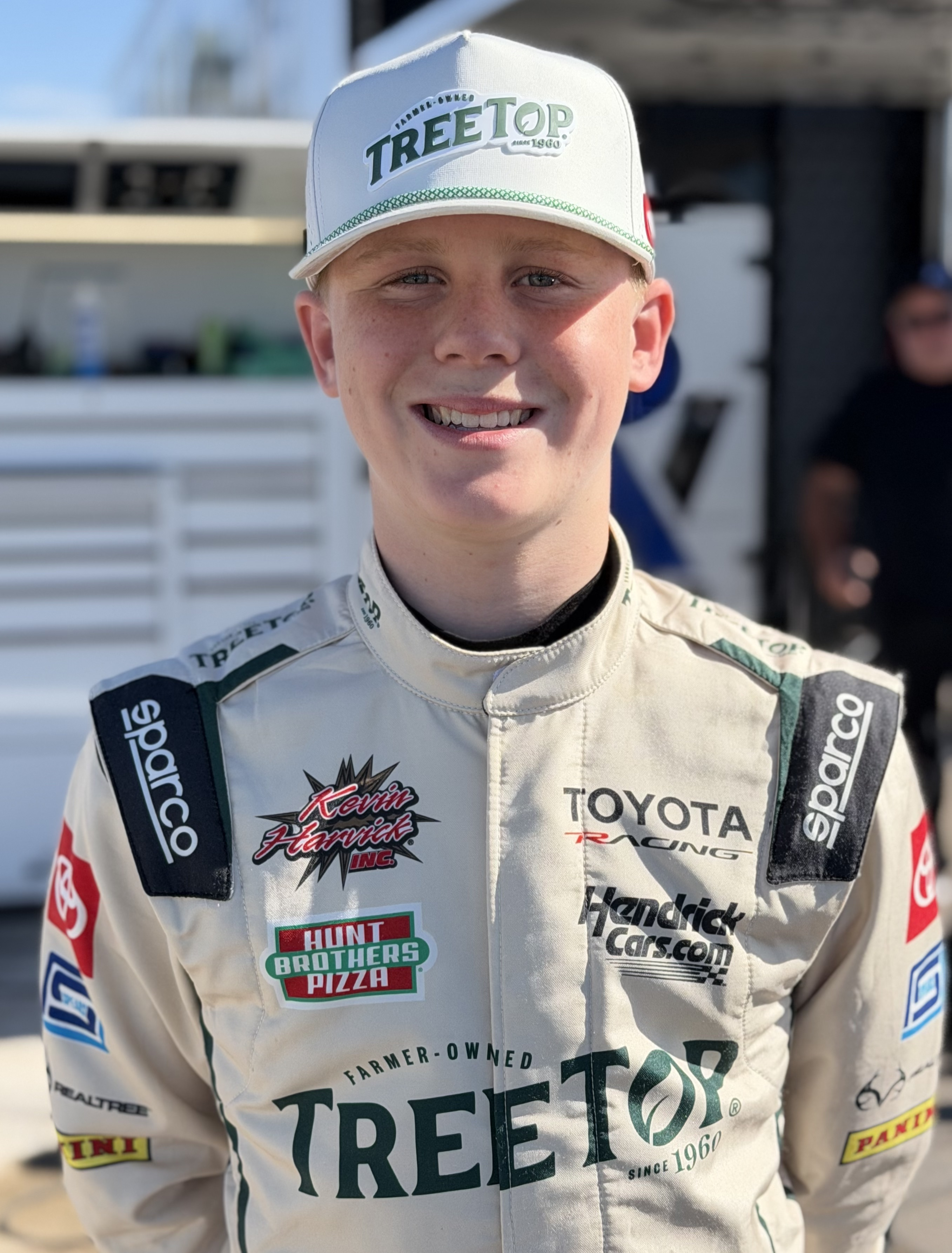
Keelan Harvick, one of Kevin's children (pictured in 2026).

The couple live in Charlotte, North Carolina with their son Keelan Harvick, who was born on July 8, 2012, and daughter Piper Harvick, born on December 28, 2017. Keelan competes in kart racing and legend car racing. In April 2021, Keelan joined his father in an eNASCAR iRacing Pro Invitational Series race. In May 2025, Keelan won his first CARS Tour West race at Kern Raceway.

Harvick is an avid fan of the Philadelphia Flyers of the NHL and Eric Lindros was possibly his favorite player. He also stated during the ESPN broadcast of the 2011 5-hour Energy 500, while there was a rain delay, that he was a fan of the New York Yankees baseball team. On August 10, 2011, Harvick threw out the ceremonial first pitch between the Yankees and the Los Angeles Angels at Yankee Stadium.

=== Kevin Harvick Foundation ===
Established in 2010 by Harvick and his wife, DeLana, the mission of the Kevin Harvick Foundation (KHF) is to support programs that enrich the lives of children throughout the United States. The foundation works to not only improve the quality of life, but to help underprivileged youth find and realize their dreams by supporting programs such as the Kevin Harvick Athletic Scholarship Fund at California State University, Bakersfield, a camper cabin at Victory Junction, Baptist Children's Homes of NC, Boys & Girls Clubs, and Kevin's Krew.

== In media ==
Harvick has made several TV talk show appearances during his career on shows such as Late Show with David Letterman, Live with Regis and Kelly, Jim Rome is Burning, and The Tony Danza Show. He was also on the first season of FX's NASCAR Drivers: 360. It took an in-depth look at NASCAR drivers outside the track and the preparation it takes to be a NASCAR driver. Harvick has also been on MTV Cribs.

In early 2003, Harvick was featured on the cover NASCAR Racing 2003 Season alongside Jimmie Johnson.

In 2004, game show Family Feud hosted a NASCAR special involving Harvick, with help from fellow Californian and then-host Richard Karn. In the special, Harvick faced off against fellow race-car driver Jeremy Mayfield and his foundation, playing Family Feud on behalf of the Kevin Harvick Foundation. Although they did not win, Harvick and his team were able to score 276 points, winning $276 for their charity.

On February 19, 2011, Harvick's sponsor, Budweiser hosted "The Roast of Kevin Harvick", which had some of Harvick's opponents and teammates give their thoughts and opinions on the Sprint Cup driver.

In 2023, Kern County Raceway Park was given new ownership to Tim and Lisa Huddleston, and the track was renamed as Kevin Harvick's Kern Raceway in his honor.

=== Nicknames ===
Harvick was nicknamed "Happy Harvick" ironically due to his occasional temper outbursts. His pit sign, which was a smiley face, was a play on the nickname. He also received the nickname "The Closer" for his ability to make late passes for the win (often with the commentators asking "Where did he come from?" because he often made them from a considerable distance behind, usually taking advantage of the leader running out of fuel in the last few corners).

== Motorsports career results ==
=== NASCAR ===
(key) (Bold – Pole position awarded by qualifying time. – Pole position earned by points standings or practice time. * – Most laps led.)

==== Cup Series ====
NASCAR Cup Series results
Year	Team	No.	Make	1	2	3	4	5	6	7	8	9	10	11	12	13	14	15	16	17	18	19	20	21	22	23	24	25	26	27	28	29	30	31	32	33	34	35	36	NCSC	Pts	Ref
2001	Richard Childress Racing	29	Chevy	DAY	CAR; 14	LVS; 8	ATL; 1	DAR; 14	BRI; 24*	TEX; 7	MAR; 34	TAL; 12	CAL; 25	RCH; 17	CLT; 2	DOV; 8	MCH; 10	POC; 15	SON; 14	DAY; 25	CHI; 1*	NHA; 8	POC; 20	IND; 11	GLN; 7	MCH; 41	BRI; 2	DAR; 8	RCH; 2	DOV; 6	KAN; 16	CLT; 8	MAR; 22	TAL; 32	PHO; 17	CAR; 27	HOM; 7	ATL; 3	NHA; 26	9th	4406	
2002	Richard Childress Racing	29	Chevy	DAY; 36	CAR; 19	LVS; 25	ATL; 39	DAR; 3	BRI; 10	TEX; 25	MAR	TAL; 28	CAL; 35	RCH; 40	CLT; 34	DOV; 28	POC; 39	MCH; 27	SON; 14	**DAY**; 11	CHI; 1	NHA; 9	POC; 6	IND; 5	GLN; 14	MCH; 3	BRI; 4	DAR; 40	RCH; 18	NHA; 33	DOV; 30	KAN; 11	TAL; 27	CLT; 22	MAR; 31	ATL; 40	CAR; 26	PHO; 17	HOM; 20	21st	3501	
2003	Richard Childress Racing	29	Chevy	DAY; 4	CAR; 25	LVS; 13	ATL; 19	DAR; 36	BRI; 7	TEX; 15	TAL; 2	MAR; 16	CAL; 29	RCH; 6	CLT; 13	DOV; 27	POC; 25	MCH; 18	SON; 3	DAY; 9*	CHI; 17	NHA; 2	POC; 12	**IND**; 1	GLN; 5	MCH; 2	BRI; 2	DAR; 2	RCH; 16	NHA; 13	DOV; 4*	TAL; 7	KAN; 6	CLT; 10	MAR; 7	ATL; 20	PHO; 34	CAR; 15	HOM; 2	5th	4770	
2004	Richard Childress Racing	29	Chevy	DAY; 4	CAR; 13	LVS; 21	ATL; 32	DAR; 8	BRI; 3	TEX; 13	MAR; 19	TAL; 3	CAL; 9	RCH; 25	CLT; 23	DOV; 10	POC; 20	MCH; 17	SON; 12	DAY; 14	CHI; 10	NHA; 13	POC; 32	IND; 8	GLN; 6	MCH; 16	BRI; 24	CAL; 28	RCH; 12	NHA; 10	DOV; 19	TAL; 2	KAN; 35	CLT; 36	MAR; 8	ATL; 35	PHO; 4	DAR; 32	HOM; 10	14th	4228	
2005	Richard Childress Racing	29	Chevy	DAY; 28	CAL; 6	LVS; 5	ATL; 21	BRI; 1	MAR; 32	TEX; 13	PHO; 19	**TAL**; 12	DAR; 14	RCH; 5	CLT; 14	DOV; 25	POC; 8	MCH; 25	SON; 37	DAY; 24	CHI; 19	NHA; 22	POC; 6	IND; 19	GLN; 15	MCH; 22	BRI; 37	CAL; 14	**RCH**; 10	NHA; 10	DOV; 19	TAL; 10	KAN; 24	CLT; 28	MAR; 15	ATL; 22	TEX; 16	PHO; 23	HOM; 8	14th	4072	
2006	Richard Childress Racing	29	Chevy	DAY; 14	CAL; 29	LVS; 11	ATL; 39	BRI; 2	MAR; 7	TEX; 5	PHO; 1	TAL; 23	RCH; 3*	DAR; 37	CLT; 34	DOV; 3	POC; 13	MCH; 10	SON; 24	DAY; 9	CHI; 4	NHA; 5	POC; 5	IND; 3	GLN; 1	MCH; 11	BRI; 11	CAL; 15	RCH; 1	**NHA**; 1*	DOV; 32	KAN; 15	TAL; 6	CLT; 18	MAR; 9	ATL; 31	TEX; 3	PHO; 1*	HOM; 5	4th	6397	
2007	Richard Childress Racing	29	Chevy	DAY; 1	CAL; 17	LVS; 27	ATL; 25	BRI; 4	MAR; 41	TEX; 29	PHO; 10	TAL; 6	RCH; 7	DAR; 17	CLT; 21	DOV; 20	POC; 11	MCH; 7	SON; 2	NHA; 8	DAY; 34	CHI; 4	IND; 7	POC; 17	GLN; 36	MCH; 15	BRI; 16	CAL; 14	RCH; 7	NHA; 17	DOV; 20	KAN; 6	TAL; 20	CLT; 33	MAR; 10	ATL; 15	TEX; 10	PHO; 6	HOM; 19	10th	6199	
2008	Richard Childress Racing	29	Chevy	DAY; 14	CAL; 8	LVS; 4	ATL; 7	BRI; 2	MAR; 12	TEX; 11	PHO; 19	TAL; 24	RCH; 8	DAR; 39	CLT; 14	DOV; 38	POC; 13	MCH; 12	SON; 30	NHA; 14	DAY; 12	CHI; 3	IND; 37	POC; 4	GLN; 6	MCH; 8	BRI; 4	CAL; 4	RCH; 7	NHA; 10	DOV; 6	KAN; 6	TAL; 20	CLT; 13	MAR; 7	ATL; 13	TEX; 7	PHO; 7	HOM; 2	4th	6408	
2009	Richard Childress Racing	29	Chevy	DAY; 2	CAL; 38	LVS; 12	ATL; 4	BRI; 30	MAR; 11	TEX; 27	PHO; 30	TAL; 38	RCH; 34	DAR; 11	CLT; 31	DOV; 17	POC; 24	MCH; 18	SON; 29	NHA; 34	DAY; 26	CHI; 19	IND; 6	POC; 12	GLN; 35	MCH; 12	BRI; 38	ATL; 2	RCH; 9	NHA; 32	DOV; 12	KAN; 24	CAL; 10	CLT; 18	MAR; 10	TAL; 21	TEX; 5	PHO; 24	HOM; 3	19th	3796	
2010	Richard Childress Racing	29	Chevy	DAY; 7*	CAL; 2	LVS; 2	ATL; 9	BRI; 11	MAR; 35	PHO; 13	TEX; 7	TAL; 1	RCH; 3	DAR; 6	DOV; 7	CLT; 11	POC; 4	MCH; 19	SON; 3	NHA; 5	DAY; 1*	CHI; 34	IND; 2	POC; 4	GLN; 11	MCH; 1	BRI; 14	ATL; 33	RCH; 9	NHA; 5	DOV; 15	KAN; 3	CAL; 7	CLT; 8	MAR; 3	TAL; 2	TEX; 6	PHO; 6	HOM; 3	3rd	6581	
2011	Richard Childress Racing	29	Chevy	DAY; 42	PHO; 4	LVS; 17	BRI; 6	CAL; 1	MAR; 1	TEX; 20	TAL; 5	RCH; 12	DAR; 17	DOV; 10	CLT; 1	KAN; 11	POC; 5	MCH; 14	SON; 9	DAY; 7	KEN; 16	NHA; 21	IND; 11	POC; 14	GLN; 6	MCH; 22	BRI; 22	ATL; 7	RCH; 1*	CHI; 2	NHA; 12	DOV; 10	KAN; 6	CLT; 6	TAL; 32	MAR; 4	TEX; 13	PHO; 19	HOM; 8	3rd	2345	
2012	Richard Childress Racing	29	Chevy	DAY; 7	PHO; 2*	LVS; 11	BRI; 11	CAL; 4	MAR; 19	TEX; 9	KAN; 6	RCH; 19	TAL; 25	DAR; 16	CLT; 8	DOV; 2	POC; 14	MCH; 10	SON; 16	KEN; 11	DAY; 23	NHA; 8	IND; 13	POC; 17	GLN; 15	MCH; 16	BRI; 15	ATL; 5	RCH; 10	CHI; 12	NHA; 11	DOV; 13	TAL; 11	CLT; 16	KAN; 11	MAR; 32	TEX; 9	PHO; 1	HOM; 8	8th	2321	
2013	Richard Childress Racing	29	Chevy	DAY; 42	PHO; 13	LVS; 9	BRI; 14	CAL; 13	MAR; 13	TEX; 13	KAN; 12	RCH; 1	TAL; 40	DAR; 5	CLT; 1	DOV; 8	POC; 9	MCH; 2	SON; 10	KEN; 10	DAY; 3	NHA; 7	IND; 19	POC; 17	GLN; 13	MCH; 2	BRI; 34	ATL; 9	RCH; 11	CHI; 3	NHA; 20	DOV; 6	**KAN**; 1*	CLT; 6	TAL; 12	MAR; 6	TEX; 8	PHO; 1*	HOM; 10	3rd	2385	
2014	Stewart–Haas Racing	4	Chevy	DAY; 13	PHO; 1*	LVS; 41	BRI; 39	CAL; 36	MAR; 7	TEX; 42	**DAR**; 1*	RCH; 11	TAL; 7	**KAN**; 2*	CLT; 2	DOV; 17	POC; 14	**MCH**; 2*	SON; 20	KEN; 7	DAY; 39	NHA; 30	**IND**; 8	POC; 2	GLN; 7	MCH; 2	**BRI**; 11	**ATL**; 19*	RCH; 5	CHI; 5*	NHA; 3*	**DOV**; 13*	**KAN**; 12	CLT; 1*	TAL; 9	MAR; 33	TEX; 2	PHO; 1*	HOM; 1	1st	5043	
2015	Stewart–Haas Racing	4	Chevy	DAY; 2	ATL; 2*	LVS; 1*	**PHO**; 1*	CAL; 2	MAR; 8*	TEX; 2	BRI; 38*	RCH; 2	TAL; 8	KAN; 2	CLT; 9	DOV; 2	POC; 2	MCH; 29*	SON; 4	DAY; 4	KEN; 8	NHA; 3	IND; 3*	POC; 42	GLN; 3*	MCH; 2	BRI; 2	DAR; 5	RCH; 14	CHI; 42	NHA; 21*	DOV; 1*	CLT; 2	KAN; 16	TAL; 15	MAR; 8	TEX; 3	PHO; 2*	HOM; 2	2nd	5042	
2016	Stewart–Haas Racing	4	Chevy	DAY; 4	ATL; 6*	LVS; 7	PHO; 1*	CAL; 2*	MAR; 17	TEX; 10	BRI; 7	RCH; 5	TAL; 15	KAN; 2	DOV; 15*	CLT; 2	POC; 9	MCH; 5	SON; 6	DAY; 39	KEN; 9*	NHA; 4	IND; 6	POC; 4	GLN; 32	BRI; 1	MCH; 5	DAR; 2*	RCH; 5	CHI; 20	NHA; 1	DOV; 37	**CLT**; 38	KAN; 1	TAL; 7	MAR; 20	TEX; 6	PHO; 4	**HOM**; 3	8th	2289	
2017	Stewart–Haas Racing	4	Ford	DAY; 22*	**ATL**; 9*	LVS; 38	PHO; 6	CAL; 13	MAR; 20	**TEX**; 4	BRI; 3	RCH; 5	TAL; 23	KAN; 3	**CLT**; 8	DOV; 9	POC; 2	MCH; 14	SON; 1	DAY; 33	KEN; 9	NHA; 5	IND; 6	POC; 2	GLN; 17	MCH; 13	BRI; 8	**DAR**; 9	RCH; 15	CHI; 3	NHA; 36	DOV; 17	CLT; 3*	TAL; 20	KAN; 8	MAR; 5	TEX; 1	PHO; 5	HOM; 4	3rd	5033	
2018	Stewart–Haas Racing	4	Ford	DAY; 31	ATL; 1*	LVS; 1*	PHO; 1	CAL; 35	MAR; 5	TEX; 2	BRI; 7	RCH; 5	**TAL**; 4	DOV; 1*	**KAN**; 1	CLT; 40	POC; 4*	MCH; 2*	SON; 2	CHI; 3	DAY; 19	KEN; 5	NHA; 1	POC; 4	GLN; 10	MCH; 1*	BRI; 10	DAR; 4	IND; 4	LVS; 39	**RCH**; 2	ROV; 9	DOV; 6*	TAL; 28	KAN; 12	MAR; 10	TEX; 1*	**PHO**; 5	HOM; 3	3rd	5034	
2019	Stewart–Haas Racing	4	Ford	DAY; 26	ATL; 4	**LVS**; 4*	PHO; 9	CAL; 4	MAR; 6	TEX; 8	BRI; 13	**RCH**; 4	TAL; 38	DOV; 4	**KAN**; 13*	CLT; 10	POC; 22	MCH; 7	SON; 6	CHI; 14*	DAY; 29	KEN; 22	NHA; 1	**POC**; 6*	GLN; 7	MCH; 1	BRI; 39	DAR; 4	**IND**; 1*	LVS; 2	RCH; 7	ROV; 3	DOV; 4	TAL; 17	KAN; 9	MAR; 7	**TEX**; 1*	PHO; 5	HOM; 4	3rd	5033	
2020	Stewart–Haas Racing	4	Ford	DAY; 5	LVS; 8*	CAL; 9	PHO; 2	DAR; 1*	DAR; 3	CLT; 5	CLT; 10*	BRI; 11	ATL; 1*	MAR; 15	HOM; 26	TAL; 10	POC; 1	POC; 2	IND; 1*	KEN; 4	TEX; 5	KAN; 4	NHA; 5	MCH; 1*	MCH; 1*	DRC; 17	DOV; 4	DOV; 1*	DAY; 20	DAR; 1	RCH; 7	BRI; 1*	LVS; 10	TAL; 20	ROV; 11	KAN; 2*	TEX; 16	MAR; 17	PHO; 7	5th	2410	
2021	Stewart–Haas Racing	4	Ford	DAY; 4	DRC; 6	HOM; 5	LVS; 20	PHO; 6	ATL; 10	BRD; 15	MAR; 9	RCH; 24	TAL; 4	KAN; 2	DAR; 6	DOV; 6	COA; 37	CLT; 10	SON; 22	NSH; 5	POC; 8	POC; 4	ROA; 27	ATL; 11	NHA; 6*	GLN; 8	IRC; 14	MCH; 14	DAY; 15	DAR; 5	RCH; 8	BRI; 2	LVS; 9	TAL; 8*	ROV; 33	TEX; 5	KAN; 3	MAR; 12	PHO; 8	5th	2361	
2022	Stewart–Haas Racing	4	Ford	DAY; 30	CAL; 7	LVS; 12	PHO; 6	ATL; 21	COA; 11	RCH; 2	MAR; 14	BRD; 34	TAL; 10	DOV; 9	DAR; 4	KAN; 15	CLT; 3	GTW; 33	SON; 4	NSH; 10	ROA; 10	ATL; 12	NHA; 5	POC; 27	IRC; 33	MCH; 1*	RCH; 1	GLN; 12	DAY; 20	DAR; 33	KAN; 36	BRI; 10	TEX; 19	TAL; 29	ROV; 2	LVS; 12	HOM; 8	MAR; 16	PHO; 5	15th	2126	
2023	Stewart–Haas Racing	4	Ford	DAY; 12	CAL; 5	LVS; 9	PHO; 5	ATL; 33	COA; 13	RCH; 5	BRD; 9	MAR; 20	TAL; 21	DOV; 19	KAN; 11	DAR; 2	CLT; 11	GTW; 10	SON; 11	NSH; 24	CSC; 29	ATL; 30	NHA; 4	POC; 4	RCH; 10	MCH; 8	IND; 23	GLN; 21	DAY; 9	DAR; 19	KAN; 11	BRI; 29	TEX; 6	TAL; 38	ROV; 19	LVS; 16	HOM; 11	MAR; 16	PHO; 7	13th	2241	

===== Daytona 500 =====
Year	Team	Manufacturer	Start	Finish
2002	Richard Childress Racing	Chevrolet	2	36
2003	Richard Childress Racing	Chevrolet	31	4
2004	Richard Childress Racing	Chevrolet	10	4
2005	Richard Childress Racing	Chevrolet	30	28
2006	Richard Childress Racing	Chevrolet	28	14
2007	Richard Childress Racing	Chevrolet	34	**1**
2008	Richard Childress Racing	Chevrolet	16	14
2009	Richard Childress Racing	Chevrolet	32	2
2010	Richard Childress Racing	Chevrolet	5	7*
2011	Richard Childress Racing	Chevrolet	7	42
2012	Richard Childress Racing	Chevrolet	13	7
2013	Richard Childress Racing	Chevrolet	3	42
2014	Stewart–Haas Racing	Chevrolet	38	13
2015	Stewart–Haas Racing	Chevrolet	11	2
2016	Stewart–Haas Racing	Chevrolet	9	4
2017	Stewart–Haas Racing	Ford	5	22*
2018	Stewart–Haas Racing	Ford	6	31
2019	Stewart–Haas Racing	Ford	3	26
2020	Stewart–Haas Racing	Ford	10	5
2021	Stewart–Haas Racing	Ford	8	4
2022	Stewart–Haas Racing	Ford	22	30
2023	Stewart–Haas Racing	Ford	13	12

==== Xfinity Series ====
NASCAR Xfinity Series results
Year	Team	No.	Make	1	2	3	4	5	6	7	8	9	10	11	12	13	14	15	16	17	18	19	20	21	22	23	24	25	26	27	28	29	30	31	32	33	34	35	NXSC	Pts	Ref
1999	Richard Childress Racing	2	Chevy	DAY	CAR	LVS	ATL	DAR	TEX	NSV	BRI	TAL	CAL	NHA	RCH	NZH	CLT	DOV	SBO	GLN	MLW	MYB	PPR	GTW	IRP	MCH	BRI	DAR; DNQ	RCH	DOV	CLT	CAR; 42	MEM	PHO	HOM				134th	37	
2000	Richard Childress Racing	2	Chevy	DAY; 5	CAR; DNQ	LVS; 13	ATL; 34	DAR; 15	BRI; 26	TEX; 9*	NSV; 4	TAL; 16	CAL; 14	RCH; 3	NHA; 18	CLT; 8	**DOV**; 6*	SBO; 8	MYB; 2	GLN; 3	MLW; 11	NZH; 17	PPR; 11	GTW; 1*	IRP; 8	MCH; 9	**BRI**; 1*	DAR; 10	RCH; 20	DOV; 22	CLT; 24	CAR; 10	MEM; 1	PHO; 27	HOM; 22				3rd	4113	
2001	Richard Childress Racing	2	Chevy	DAY; 2	CAR; 2	LVS; 12	ATL; 8	DAR; 8	**BRI**; 7*	TEX; 1*	**NSH**; 7	TAL; 40	CAL; 5	RCH; 5	**NHA**; 2*	NZH; 2*	**CLT**; 26	DOV; 3*	KEN; 1*	**MLW**; 4*	GLN; 3	CHI; 27	GTW; 1*	PPR; 3	IRP; 1	MCH; 2	BRI; 1*	DAR; 14	RCH; 27	DOV; 14	KAN; 38	CLT; 4	**MEM**; 3	PHO; 3	CAR; 5	HOM; 37*			1st	4813	
2002	Richard Childress Racing	29	Chevy	DAY	CAR	LVS	DAR	BRI; 24	TEX; 6	NSH	TAL	CAL	RCH	NHA	NZH	CLT	DOV	NSH	KEN	MLW	DAY	CHI	GTW	PPR	IRP	MCH	BRI; 30	DAR	RCH	DOV	KAN	CLT	MEM	ATL	CAR	PHO; 37	HOM		64th	376	
2003	Richard Childress Racing	21	Chevy	DAY; 3	**CAR**; 10	LVS; 2*	DAR	BRI; 1*	TEX	TAL	NSH	CAL; 3*	RCH; 1	GTW	NZH	**CLT**; 9	DOV	NSH	KEN	MLW	DAY	CHI	**NHA**; 2*	PPR	IRP	MCH; 1	BRI; 5*	**DAR**; 5*	**RCH**; 2	**DOV**; 9		**CLT**; 9	MEM	ATL; 9	**PHO**; 2	CAR; 14	HOM; 6		16th	3077	
2003	Richard Childress Racing	29	Chevy																												KAN; 2								16th	3077	
2004	Richard Childress Racing	21	Chevy	DAY; 4	CAR; 3	LVS; 1	DAR; 21	BRI; 2	TEX	NSH	TAL	CAL; 8	GTW	RCH; 3	NZH	CLT; 3	DOV; 6	NSH	KEN	MLW	DAY; 8	CHI; 41	NHA; 5	PPR	IRP	MCH; 30	BRI; 4	CAL; 3	RCH; 7	DOV; 6	KAN	CLT; 11	MEM		PHO; 13	DAR; 23			20th	3129	
2004	Richard Childress Racing	29	Chevy																															ATL; 15			HOM; 1		20th	3129	
2005	Richard Childress Racing	21	Chevy	DAY; 2	CAL; 2	MXC; 2	LVS; 2	ATL	NSH			PHO; 4	TAL; 18	DAR	RCH; 12	CLT; 11	DOV; 29*	NSH	KEN	MLW	**DAY**; 2	CHI; 1	**NHA**; 8*	PPR	GTW	IRP	GLN	MCH; 13	BRI; 3	CAL	RCH; 1*	DOV	KAN; 4	CLT; 24	MEM	TEX; 1	PHO; 4	HOM; 4	18th	3259	
2005	Richard Childress Racing	29	Chevy							BRI; 1	TEX																												18th	3259	
2006	Richard Childress Racing	29	Chevy	DAY; 5																																			1st	5648	
2006	Kevin Harvick Incorporated	33	Chevy		CAL; 8			ATL; 11		TEX; 8																								CLT; 9					1st	5648	
2006	Richard Childress Racing	21	Chevy			MXC; 3	LVS; 3*		**BRI**; 2*		NSH; 1	PHO; 1	TAL; 2	RCH; 1	DAR; 7	CLT; 8	**DOV**; 13	NSH; 6	KEN; 9	MLW; 19	DAY; 3	CHI; 4	NHA; 2	MAR; 1*	GTW; 5	IRP; 1*	GLN; 7	MCH; 8	BRI; 2	CAL; 2	RCH; 1*	DOV; 3	KAN; 1		MEM; 1	TEX; 1*	PHO; 2	**HOM**; 6	1st	5648	
2007	Richard Childress Racing	21	Chevy	DAY; 1			**LVS**; 4	ATL; 5					TAL; 10		DAR; 10						**NHA**; 1*	DAY; 2	CHI; 1	GTW	IRP	CGV; 1	GLN; 1*	MCH; 3								TEX; 1	PHO; 5	HOM; 16*	4th	3993	
2007	Kevin Harvick Incorporated	33	Chevy		CAL; 6	MXC			BRI; 8	NSH	TEX; 11					CLT; 12													BRI; 16	CAL; 7	RCH; 24	DOV		CLT; 10	MEM				4th	3993	
2007	Kevin Harvick Incorporated	77	Chevy									PHO; 9		RCH; 4			DOV; 7	NSH	KEN	MLW													KAN; 13						4th	3993	
2008	Kevin Harvick Incorporated	33	Chevy	DAY; 21	CAL; 3	LVS; 4	ATL; 2	BRI; 7	NSH	**TEX**; 34	PHO; 4	MXC	TAL	RCH; 2	DAR; 13	CLT; 19	DOV; 17	NSH	KEN	MLW	NHA; 4	DAY; 12	CHI; 18	GTW	IRP	CGV	GLN; 4	MCH	BRI	CAL; 11	RCH; 8	DOV; 28	**KAN**; 13	CLT; 6	MEM	TEX; 29	PHO; 3	HOM	18th	2936	
2009	Kevin Harvick Incorporated	33	Chevy	**DAY**; 11	CAL; 2	LVS; 29	BRI; 1	TEX	NSH	PHO; 5	TAL	RCH; 5	DAR	CLT; 23	DOV; 13	NSH	KEN	MLW	NHA; 5	DAY; 10	CHI; 5	GTW; 17*	IRP	IOW; 30	**GLN**; 4	MCH; 5	BRI; 4*	CGV	ATL; 1*	RCH; 2	DOV	KAN; 4	CAL; 4	CLT	MEM	TEX; 6	PHO; 2	HOM	15th	3248	
2010	Kevin Harvick Incorporated	33	Chevy	DAY; 3	CAL; 38	LVS; 1*	BRI; 5	NSH; 1	PHO; 2	TEX; 5	**TAL**; 3*	RCH; 7	DAR; 8	DOV; 6	CLT; 6	NSH	KEN	ROA	NHA; 7	DAY; 5	**CHI**; 7	GTW; 16	IRP	IOW; 2	GLN; 3	MCH; 10	BRI	CGV	ATL; 4	**RCH**; 1*	DOV; 5	KAN; 4	CAL; 3*	CLT; 10	GTW	TEX; 8	PHO; 2	HOM; 2	6th	4389	
2011	Kevin Harvick Incorporated	33	Chevy	DAY	PHO; 3	LVS; 28	BRI; 6	CAL; 3	TEX							CLT; 16	CHI; 13	MCH	ROA		KEN; 2	NHA; 2	NSH	IRP	IOW	GLN	CGV	BRI	ATL; 4	RCH; 20	CHI	DOV							99th	0^{1}	
2011	Kevin Harvick Incorporated	4	Chevy							TAL; 39	NSH	RCH	DAR	DOV	IOW					**DAY**; 18													KAN; 6	CLT	TEX	PHO	HOM		99th	0^{1}	
2012	Richard Childress Racing	33	Chevy	DAY	PHO; 5*	LVS	BRI; 9	CAL	TEX	**RCH**; 3*	TAL; 22	DAR	IOW	CLT; 4*	DOV	MCH	ROA	KEN; 3	DAY; 28	NHA; 2	CHI	IND	IOW	GLN	CGV	BRI; 15*	ATL; 3*	RCH; 1*	CHI	KEN	DOV	CLT; 2	KAN	TEX; 1*	PHO	HOM			101st	0^{1}	
2013	Richard Childress Racing	33	Chevy	DAY	PHO; 33	LVS	BRI; 5	CAL	TEX; 5	RCH; 2*	TAL	DAR	CLT; 5	DOV	IOW	MCH	ROA	KEN	DAY	NHA	CHI	IND; 5	IOW	GLN	MOH	BRI	ATL; 1*	RCH	CHI; 9	KEN	DOV; 3	KAN	CLT; 4	TEX	PHO; 9	HOM			94th	0^{1}	
2014	JR Motorsports	88	Chevy	DAY	PHO; 2	LVS																																	79th	0^{1}	
2014	JR Motorsports	5	Chevy				BRI; 3	CAL; 2	**TEX**; 4*	DAR; 7	RCH; 1*	TAL	IOW	CLT; 4	DOV	MCH	ROA	KEN; 1	DAY	NHA	CHI	IND; 4*	IOW	GLN	MOH	BRI; 7	ATL; 1*	RCH; 3	CHI; 1	KEN	DOV	KAN; 2*	CLT	TEX; 8	PHO	HOM			79th	0^{1}	
2015	JR Motorsports	88	Chevy	DAY	ATL; 1*	LVS	PHO; 3	CAL; 1*	TEX	BRI; 7	RCH; 18	TAL	IOW	CLT; 14	DOV	MCH; 6	CHI	DAY	KEN	NHA	IND; 6	IOW	GLN	MOH	BRI; 8	ROA	DAR; 4	RCH	CHI	KEN	DOV	CLT	KAN; 15	TEX; 2	PHO	HOM			86th	0^{1}	
2016	JR Motorsports	88	Chevy	DAY	ATL; 12	LVS	PHO	CAL; 6	TEX	BRI; 8	RCH	TAL	DOV	CLT	POC	MCH	IOW	DAY	KEN	NHA	IND; 2	IOW	GLN	MOH	BRI	ROA	DAR; 35	RCH	CHI	KEN	DOV	CLT; 7	KAN	TEX; 3	PHO	HOM			96th	0^{1}	
2017	Stewart–Haas Racing	41	Ford	DAY	ATL; 4*	LVS	PHO	CAL	TEX; 3	BRI	RCH	TAL	CLT; 2	DOV	POC	MCH	IOW	DAY	KEN; 4	NHA	IND	IOW	GLN; 6	MOH	BRI	ROA	DAR; 3	RCH	CHI	KEN	DOV	CLT	KAN	TEX	PHO	HOM			95th	0^{1}	
2018	Stewart–Haas Racing with Biagi-DenBeste	98	Ford	DAY	ATL; 1*	LVS	PHO	CAL	TEX; 19	BRI	RCH	TAL	DOV	CLT	POC	MCH; 8	IOW	CHI; 2	DAY	KEN	NHA	IOW	GLN	MOH	BRI	ROA	DAR; 29	IND	LVS	RCH	ROV	DOV	KAN	TEX	PHO	HOM			86th	0^{1}	
2021	B. J. McLeod Motorsports	5	Ford	DAY	DRC	HOM	LVS	PHO	ATL	MAR	TAL	DAR	DOV	COA; 4	CLT	MOH	TEX	NSH	POC																				77th	0^{1}	
2021	B. J. McLeod Motorsports	99	Ford																	ROA; 6	ATL	NHA	GLN	IRC; 33	MCH	DAY	DAR	RCH	BRI	LVS	TAL	ROV	TEX	KAN	MAR	PHO			77th	0^{1}	

==== Camping World Truck Series ====
NASCAR Camping World Truck Series results
Year	Team	No.	Make	1	2	3	4	5	6	7	8	9	10	11	12	13	14	15	16	17	18	19	20	21	22	23	24	25	26	27	NCWTC	Pts	Ref
1995	Mike Harvick	72	Chevy	PHO	TUS	SGS	MMR	POR	EVG	I70	LVL	BRI	MLW	CNS	HPT	IRP	FLM	RCH	MAR	NWS	SON	MMR; 27	PHO; DNQ								84th	101	
1996	Mike Harvick	72	Chevy	HOM	PHO; 35	POR; 31	EVG; 30	TUS	CNS	HPT	BRI	NZH	MLW	LVL	I70	IRP	FLM	GLN	NSV	RCH	NHA	MAR	NWS	SON	MMR; 11	PHO	LVS				58th	331	
1997	Spears Motorsports	79	Chevy	WDW	TUS; 21	HOM	PHO	POR	EVG	I70	NHA	TEX	BRI	NZH	MLW	LVL; 11															26th	1355	
1997	Spears Motorsports	75	Chevy														CNS; 20	HPT; 30	IRP; 23	FLM; 23	NSV; 16	GLN; 23	RCH; DNQ	MAR	SON; 33	MMR; 8	CAL; 20	PHO; 34	LVS; 8		26th	1355	
1998	Spears Motorsports	75	Chevy	WDW; 18	HOM; 13	PHO; 13	POR; 14	EVG; 31	I70; 26	GLN; 29	TEX; 4	BRI; 22	MLW; 11	NZH; 14	CAL; 30	PPR; 15	IRP; 11	NHA; 7	FLM; 9	NSV	HPT; 5	LVL; 13	RCH; 25	MEM; 15	GTW; 11	MAR; 25	SON; 17	MMR; 5	PHO; 18	LVS; 20	17th	3004	
1999	Liberty Racing	98	Ford	HOM; 27	PHO; 23	EVG; 9	MMR; 2	MAR; 10	MEM; 2*	PPR; 3	I70; 16	BRI; 6	TEX; 24	PIR; 20	GLN; 7	MLW; 17	NSV; 2	NZH; 25	MCH; 11	NHA; 15	IRP; 4	GTW; 27	HPT; 31	RCH; 22	LVS; 9	LVL; 4	TEX; 20	CAL; 15			12th	3139	
2001	Kevin Harvick Incorporated	6	Chevy	DAY	HOM	MMR	MAR	GTW	DAR	PPR	DOV	TEX	MEM	MLW	KAN	KEN	NHA	IRP	NSH	CIC	NZH	RCH; 2	SBO	TEX	LVS	PHO	CAL				122nd	0	
2002	Kevin Harvick Incorporated	6	Chevy	DAY	DAR; 4	MAR; 29	GTW	PPR	DOV	TEX	MEM	MLW	KAN	KEN	NHA; 8*	MCH	IRP	NSH	RCH; 2	TEX	SBO	LVS	CAL	PHO; 1*	HOM						30th	748	
2003	Kevin Harvick Incorporated	6	Chevy	DAY	DAR; 26	MMR	MAR; 3	CLT; 5*	DOV	TEX	MEM	MLW; 35	KAN	KEN	GTW	MCH	IRP	NSH	BRI; 10*	RCH	NHA	CAL	LVS	SBO	TEX	MAR	PHO; 1*	HOM			30th	807	
2004	Kevin Harvick Incorporated	92	Chevy	DAY	ATL	MAR	MFD	CLT; 4	DOV	TEX	MEM	MLW	KAN	KEN	GTW	MCH	IRP	NSH	BRI; 5	RCH	NHA	LVS	CAL	TEX	MAR	PHO	DAR	HOM			53rd	315	
2005	Kevin Harvick Incorporated	92	Chevy	DAY	CAL	ATL	MAR; 12	GTW	MFD	CLT	DOV	TEX	MCH; 4	MLW	KAN	KEN	MEM	IRP	NSH	BRI											55th	335	
2005	Morgan-Dollar Motorsports	47	Chevy																		RCH; 3	NHA	LVS	MAR	ATL	TEX	PHO	HOM			55th	335	
2007	Kevin Harvick Incorporated	2	Chevy	DAY	CAL; 8	ATL	MAR; 4	KAN	CLT; 28	MFD	DOV	TEX	MCH; 8	MLW	MEM	KEN	IRP	NSH	BRI	GTW	NHA	LVS	TAL	MAR	ATL	TEX	PHO; 5	HOM; 4			36th	848	
2008	Kevin Harvick Incorporated	2	Chevy	DAY	CAL	ATL	MAR	KAN	CLT	MFD	DOV	TEX	MCH	MLW	MEM	KEN	IRP	NSH	BRI	GTW	NHA	LVS	TAL	MAR; 15	ATL	TEX	PHO; 1	HOM; 3			45th	478	
2009	Kevin Harvick Incorporated	2	Chevy	DAY	CAL	ATL; 2*	MAR; 1	KAN	CLT	DOV	TEX	MCH	MLW	MEM	KEN	IRP	NSH	BRI	CHI	IOW	GTW	NHA; 3	LVS								27th	1085	
2009	Kevin Harvick Incorporated	4	Chevy																					MAR; 5	TAL	TEX	PHO; 1*	HOM; 1*			27th	1085	
2010	Kevin Harvick Incorporated	2	Chevy	DAY	ATL; 1*	**MAR**; 1*	NSH; 2	KAN	DOV	CLT	TEX	MCH	IOW	**GTW**; 1*	IRP	POC	NSH	DAR	BRI	CHI	KEN	NHA; 3	LVS	MAR; 15	TAL	TEX	PHO	HOM			27th	1048	
2011	Kevin Harvick Incorporated	2	Chevy	DAY	PHO	DAR	MAR; 4	NSH	DOV; 5	CLT	KAN	TEX	KEN	IOW	NSH	IRP	**POC**; 1*	MCH; 1	BRI; 1*	ATL	CHI; 2*	NHA; 3	KEN	LVS	TAL	MAR; 6	TEX; 1*	HOM; 3			82nd	0^{1}	
2012	Richard Childress Racing	2	Chevy	DAY	**MAR**; 1*	CAR	KAN	CLT	**DOV**; 3*	TEX	KEN	IOW	CHI	POC	MCH	BRI	ATL	IOW	KEN	LVS	TAL	MAR; 12*	TEX	PHO	HOM						77th	0^{1}	
2013	NTS Motorsports	24	Chevy	DAY	MAR; 25	CAR	KAN	CLT	DOV	TEX	KEN	IOW	ELD	POC	MCH	BRI	MSP	IOW	CHI	LVS	TAL										107th	0^{1}	
2013	NTS Motorsports	14	Chevy																			MAR; 30	TEX	PHO	HOM						107th	0^{1}	
2015	JR Motorsports	00	Chevy	DAY	ATL	MAR	KAN	CLT	DOV	TEX	GTW	IOW	KEN	ELD	POC; 2	MCH	BRI	MSP	CHI	NHA	LVS	TAL	MAR	TEX	PHO	HOM					88th	0^{1}	
2021	David Gilliland Racing	17	Ford	DAY	DRC	LVS	ATL	BRD; 15	RCH	KAN	DAR	COA	CLT	TEX	NSH	POC	KNX	GLN	GTW	DAR	BRI	LVS	TAL	MAR	PHO						105th	0^{1}	

^{*} Season still in progress
^{1} Ineligible for series points

=== ARCA Bondo/Mar-Hyde Series ===
(key) (Bold – Pole position awarded by qualifying time. Italics – Pole position earned by points standings or practice time. * – Most laps led.)

ARCA Bondo/Mar-Hyde Series results
Year	Team	No.	Make	1	2	3	4	5	6	7	8	9	10	11	12	13	14	15	16	17	18	19	20	21	ABMSC	Pts	Ref
1999	Richard Childress Racing	20	Chevy	DAY	ATL	SLM	AND	CLT	MCH	POC	TOL	SBS	BLN	POC	KIL	FRS	FLM	ISF	WIN	DSF	SLM	CLT; 2	TAL; 3	ATL	61st	435	

==== K&N Pro Series West ====
NASCAR K&N Pro Series West results
Year	Team	No.	Make	1	2	3	4	5	6	7	8	9	10	11	12	13	14	15	Pos.	Pts	Ref
1996	Spears Motorsports	75	Chevy	TUS	AMP	MMR	SON	MAD	POR	TUS	EVG	CNS	MAD	MMR	SON	MMR	PHO	LVS; 13	58th	124	
1997	Spears Motorsports	75	Chevy	TUS	AMP	SON	TUS	MMR; 13	LVS	CAL	EVG	POR	PPR	AMP	SON	MMR; 8	LVS; 8		31st	418	
1998	Spears Motorsports	75	Chevy	TUS; 13	**LVS**; 1*	**PHO**; 2	CAL; 2	**HPT**; 4*	**MMR**; 21	AMP; 1	POR; 7	**CAL**; 1*	PPR; 1*	EVG; 3	SON; 1	MMR; 5	LVS; 3		1st	2315	
1999	Bernie Hilber Racing	7	Pontiac	TUS	LVS	PHO	CAL	PPR	MMR; 3	IRW	EVG	POR	IRW	RMR	LVS	MMR	MOT		56th	165	
2000	Cain Motorsports	71	Chevy	PHO	MMR	LVS	CAL	LAG	IRW	POR	EVG	IRW	RMR	**MMR**; 18	IRW				61st	109	
2005	Kevin Harvick Incorporated	92	Chevy	PHO; 18	MMR	PHO	S99	IRW	EVG	S99	PPR	CAL	DCS	CTS	MMR				44th	134	
2007	Kevin Harvick Incorporated	33	Chevy	CTS	PHO	AMP	ELK	**IOW**; 1	CNS	SON	DCS	IRW	MMP	EVG	CSR	AMP			42nd	190	
2017	Jefferson Pitts Racing	4	Ford	TUS	KCR	IRW	IRW	SPO	OSS	CNS	SON; 1	IOW	EVG	DCS	MER	AAS	KCR		36th	47	
2018	Jefferson Pitts Racing	4	Ford	**KCR**; 4*	TUS	TUS	OSS	CNS	SON	DCS	IOW	EVG	GTW	LVS	MER	AAS	KCR		31st	42	

=== 24 Hours of Daytona ===
(key)

24 Hours of Daytona results
Year	Class	No	Team	Car	Co-drivers	Laps	Position	Class Pos.	Ref
2002	AGT	90	(United States) Flis Motorsports	Chevy Corvette	(United States) Rick Carelli (United States) John Metcalf (United States) Davy Lee Liniger	123	69 ^{DNF}	8 ^{DNF}	

=== International Race of Champions ===
(key) (Bold – Pole position. * – Most laps led.)

International Race of Champions results
Year	Make	1	2	3	4	Pos.	Points	Ref
2002	Pontiac	DAY; 9	CAL; 1*	CHI; 4	IND; 5	1st	54	
2003	Pontiac	DAY; 7	TAL; 6	CHI; 4	IND; 2	5th	48	
2004	Pontiac	DAY; 7	TEX; 2	RCH; 5	ATL; 7*	3rd	55	

=== Superstar Racing Experience ===
(key) * – Most laps led. ^{1} – Heat 1 winner. ^{2} – Heat 2 winner.

Superstar Racing Experience results
Year	No.	1	2	3	4	5	6	SRXC	Pts
2023	4	STA; 12	STA II	MMS	BER; 10	ELD	LOS	20th	0^{1}

=== CARS Late Model Stock Car Tour ===
(key) (Bold – Pole position awarded by qualifying time. Italics – Pole position earned by points standings or practice time. * – Most laps led. ** – All laps led.)

CARS Late Model Stock Car Tour results
Year	Team	No.	Make	1	2	3	4	5	6	7	8	9	10	11	12	13	14	15	16	17	CLMSCTC	Pts	Ref
2023	Kevin Harvick Incorporated	62	Ford	SNM	FLC	HCY	ACE	NWS; 11	LGY	DOM	CRW	HCY	ACE	TCM	WKS	AAS	SBO	TCM	CRW		53rd	22	
2024	Kevin Harvick Incorporated	62	Chevy	SNM	HCY	AAS	OCS	ACE	TCM	LGY	DOM	CRW	HCY	NWS; 11	ACE	WCS	FLC	SBO	TCM	NWS	N/A	0	

=== CARS Pro Late Model Tour ===
(key)

CARS Pro Late Model Tour results
Year	Team	No.	Make	1	2	3	4	5	6	7	8	9	10	11	12	13	CPLMTC	Pts	Ref
2024	Kevin Harvick Incorporated	62	Chevy	SNM	HCY	OCS	ACE	TCM	CRW	HCY	NWS	ACE	FLC; 7	SBO	TCM	NWS	N/A	0	
2025	Kevin Harvick Incorporated	29	Chevy	AAS	CDL	OCS	ACE	NWS	CRW	HCY; 3	HCY	AND	FLC	SBO	TCM	NWS; 23	36th	58	
2026	Kevin Harvick Incorporated	29	Chevy	SNM	NSV	CRW	ACE	NWS	HCY	AND	FLC	TCM	NPS; 7	SBO			44th	35	

== See also ==
- List of 2014 motorsport champions
- List of all-time NASCAR Cup Series winners
- List of NASCAR Nationwide Series champions
- List of NASCAR race wins by Kevin Harvick
- List of NASCAR Sprint All-Star Race drivers
- List of NASCAR Sprint Cup Series champions
- List of people from Bakersfield, California

Sporting positions
Preceded by Jimmie Johnson	NASCAR Cup Series Champion; 2014	Succeeded by Kyle Busch
Preceded by Jeff Green; Martin Truex Jr.	NASCAR Busch Series Champion; 2001; 2006	Succeeded by Greg Biffle; Carl Edwards
Preceded by Butch Gilliland	NASCAR Winston West Series champion 1998	Succeeded by Sean Woodside
Preceded by Bobby Labonte	IROC Champion; IROC XXVI (2002)	Succeeded by Kurt Busch
Achievements
Preceded by Bill Elliott; Brad Keselowski	Brickyard 400 winner 2003; 2019, 2020	Succeeded by Jeff Gordon; Kyle Larson
Preceded by Jimmie Johnson	Daytona 500 winner 2007	Succeeded by Ryan Newman
Preceded by Kurt Busch; Kasey Kahne	Coca-Cola 600 winner 2011; 2013	Succeeded by Kasey Kahne; Jimmie Johnson
Preceded by Jimmie Johnson; Kyle Busch	All-Star Race winner 2007; 2018	Succeeded by Kasey Kahne; Kyle Larson
Preceded by Roger Brown	TD Bank 250 winner 2008	Succeeded by Eddie MacDonald
Preceded by Dale Earnhardt Jr. Kyle Busch	Busch Clash winner 2009, 2010; 2013	Succeeded by Kurt Busch; Denny Hamlin
Preceded by Matt Kenseth; Erik Jones	Southern 500 winner 2014; 2020	Succeeded by Carl Edwards; Denny Hamlin
Awards
Preceded by Matt Kenseth	NASCAR Winston Cup Series Rookie of the Year; 2001	Succeeded by Ryan Newman
Preceded by Tony Raines	NASCAR Busch Series Rookie of the Year; 2000	Succeeded by Greg Biffle
Preceded by Tony Stewart	NASCAR EA cover athlete 2005	Succeeded by Jeff Gordon/Jimmie Johnson
Preceded by Ryan Hunter-Reay	Best Driver ESPY Award; 2015	Succeeded by Kyle Busch
