= Venom Energy =

American brand of energy drink

- Type: Energy drink
- Manufacturer: Keurig Dr Pepper
- Introduced: 2002; 2008 (relaunched)
- Variants: Black Mamba (red), Mojave Rattler (purple), Killer Taipan (yellow), Death Adder (orange), Venom Bite (Energy shot), Citrus (white/green), Strawberry Apple (white/red), Black Cherry Kiwi (magenta/green), Watermelon Lime (pink/green)

Venom Energy is an American brand of energy drink that is produced and distributed by Keurig Dr Pepper of Plano, Texas. It is one of the few energy drinks that uses a thick aluminum bottle. Venom Energy was released in 2002 in a more typical beverage container and was relaunched in the new aluminum bottle and with a new taste in early 2008.

Venom Energy was originally known as Elements Energy. It later rebranded to its current name after sales began to wane.

Some of the original Elements flavors did survive the rebranding: Black Mamba (Venom), Mango (Infusion), Citrus (Voltage), Strawberry Apple (Atomic), Black Cherry Kiwi (Subzero).

In 2008, Venom Energy entered into a partnership with the Arena Football League to promote the product during the 2008 playoffs on ESPN and ABC. In addition, Terrell Owens is now a spokesman for the brand. The company also sponsors the Andretti Autosport IndyCar Series team with driver Marco Andretti, Pavel Datsyuk of the Detroit Red Wings, Max Talbot of the Pittsburgh Penguins and Milan Lucic of the Boston Bruins, all from the NHL as well as Jordan Farmar of the New Jersey Nets (NBA) and Lance Berkman of the St. Louis Cardinals (MLB).

== Ingredients ==
Venom Energy contains large doses of taurine, glucuronolactone, and guarana, with L-carnitine, inositol and maltodextrin as additional ingredients. The caffeine content of Venom energy drinks is roughly 162 mg per bottle, or approximately equal to that found in sixteen ounces of plain Starbucks coffee.

Venom was historically bottled in half-liter aluminum bottles (16.9 fluid ounces). In 2012, Venom downsized the bottles to 16 fluid ounces, the standard size of most other energy drink single-serve cans.

== Flavor types ==
Flavors types	Color
Black Mamba	Red
Mojave Rattler	Purple (low cal)
Killer Taipan Mango	Yellow
Death Adder Fruit Punch	Orange
Venom Bite	Energy shot
Citrus	Green/White (low cal)
Strawberry Apple	Red/White (low cal)
Black Cherry Kiwi	Magenta/Green
Watermelon Lime	Pink/Green (low cal)
