= V (drink) =

Energy drink brand

V Energy
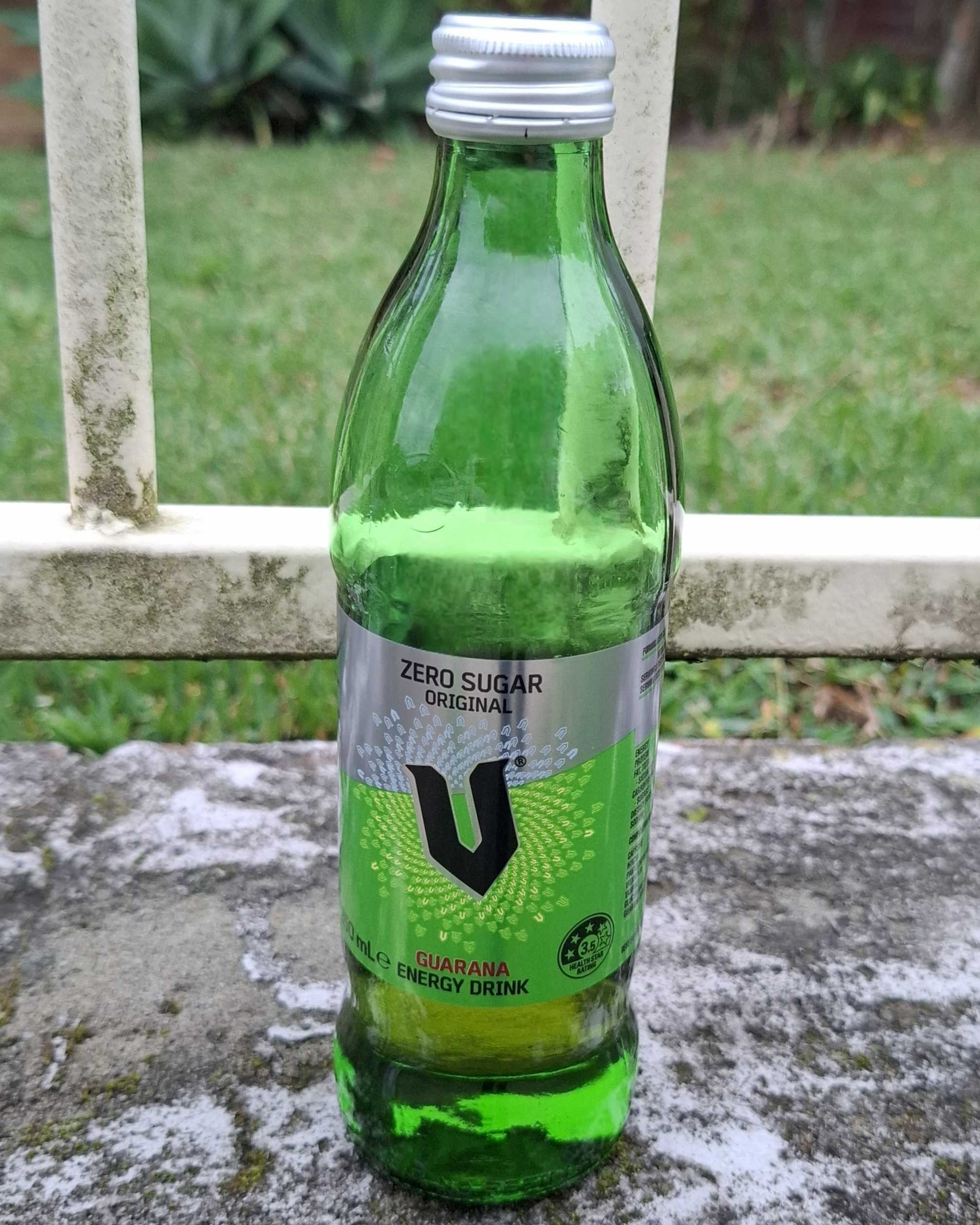
- A V Energy Drink bottle from Lautoka, Fiji (2025 bottle design)
- Type: Energy drink
- Manufacturer: Suntory Oceania
- Origin: New Zealand
- Introduced: 1997
- Website: https://v.co.nz/ https://v-energy.com.au/

V is an energy drink brand produced by Suntory Oceania, a New Zealand–based beverage manufacturer, known as Frucor at the drink's original release. It was launched in Methven, New Zealand in August 1997 and in Australia in 1999. The product's success, a market share over 60% in New Zealand in 2000 and 42% in Australia, makes it the most popular brand of energy drink in both countries. V is considered a local rival to Red Bull. It contains guaraná as a iconic ingredient.

== Drink variants ==
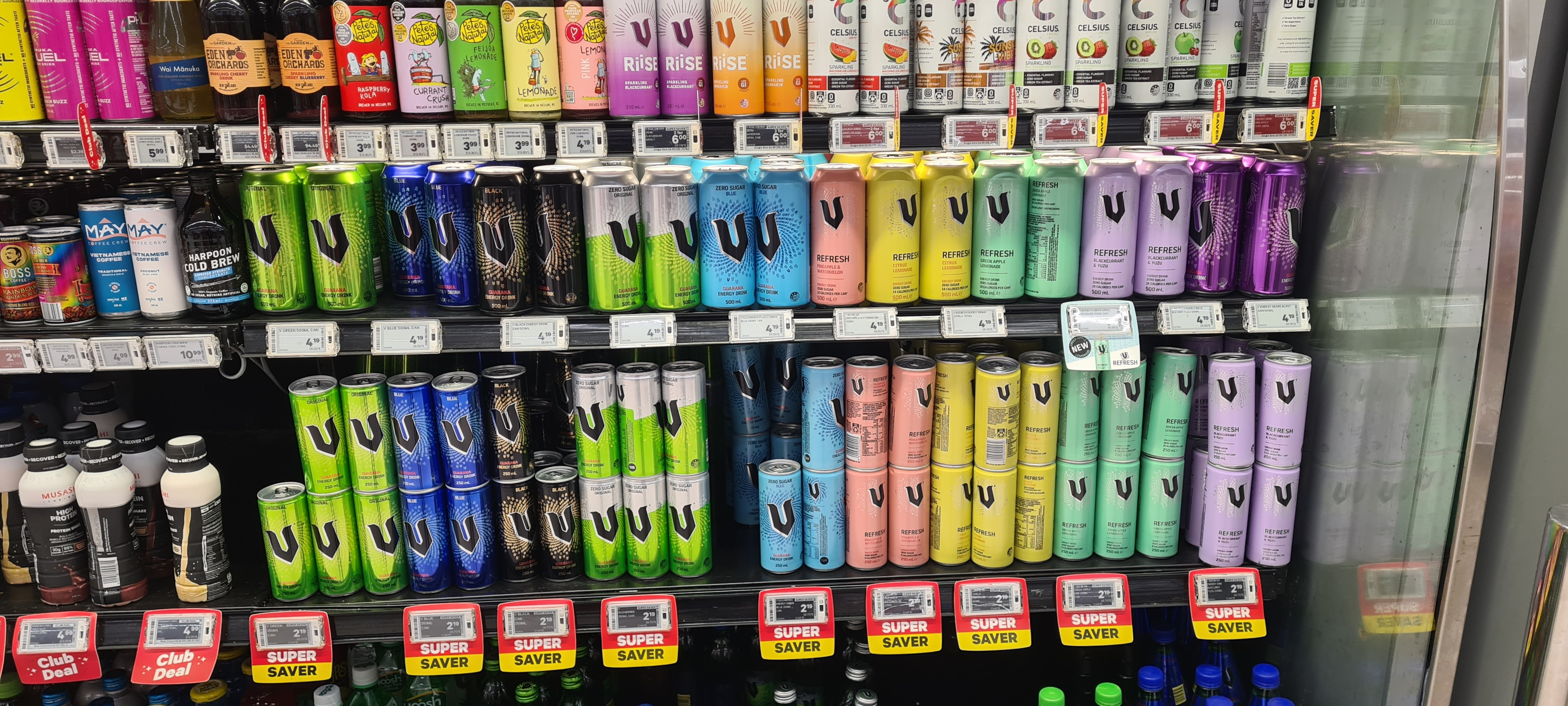
A supermarket shelf in 2025 containing a wide range of V energy drinks including Original, Blue, Black, Sugar Free, Grape Burst, as well as the V Riise and V Refresh lines

=== Currently available ===
==== Standard drinks ====
V Energy (also referred to as "Green V"; retroactively titled "Original") is the original flavour of V released in 1997. Marketing emphasises its guaraná content which as of 2026 is 120 mg. The flavour was controversially reconfigured in 2023.

Blue (also referred to as "Blue V") is a pineapple and passion fruit flavour introduced in October 2011, marketed at the time as a challenge for the drinker to try and work out the flavour.

Black is a flavour variant that was last released in 2024, described as having a "strong coffee flavour". Initially released in 2006, it was first discontinued in 2013. It was then later re-released in 2018 for a limited time in New Zealand over a six-week period.

Grape Burst (also referred to as "Purple V") is a grape fruit flavour introduced in 2025.

==== Sugar-free drinks ====
V Refresh was launched in 2022 as a no-sugar, low-calorie product line, packaged in matte pastel coloured cans. The original flavours were Citrus Lemonade and Pineapple & Watermelon. A Blackcurrant & Yuzu flavour was released later in September 2024.

V Riise launched in 2025 with two flavours: Sparkling Blackcurrant and Sparkling Mandarin. V Riise is marketed as having slow release energy due to its usage of isomaltulose.

In July 2025, V released three new low-calorie flavours: Cotton Candy, Watermelon Candy, and Strawberries & Cream.

=== Discontinued ===
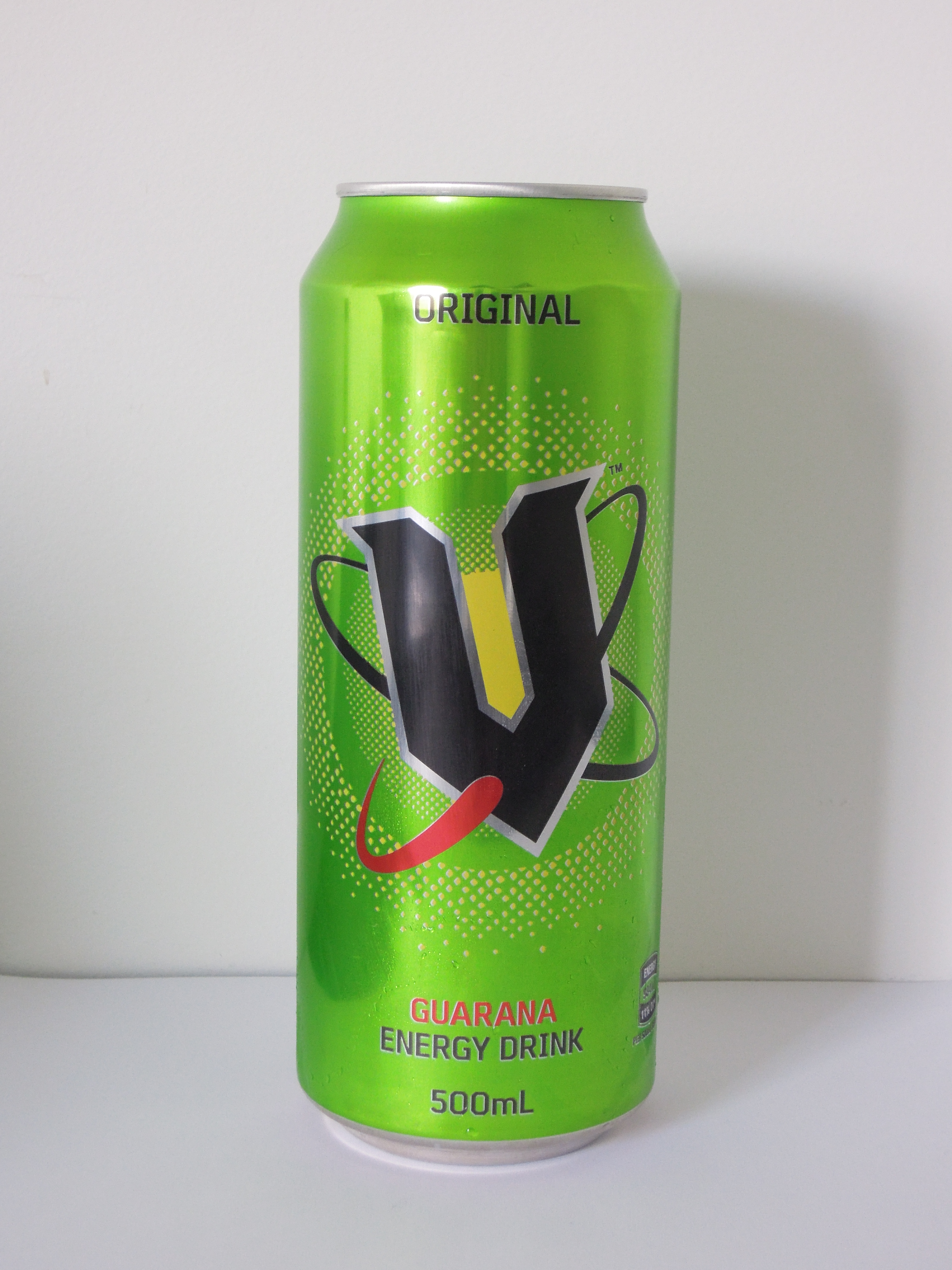
500ml can of V Energy Drink, made to be competitive with the portion size of Monster Energy, 2023 can design

V Pure was a flavour alternative released in 2016 made from six natural ingredients; apple juice, sparkling water, lemon juice, Guarana seed extract, caffeine from green coffee beans and natural V flavour.

V Tortured Orchard Raspberry Lemonade was introduced in 2018.

V Tropical Tang was a tropical-flavored drink released in May 2023, and was described as tasting like "guava, pineapple and berries". It was only available in 500ml cans.

==== Energy shots ====
In 2009, V released energy shots, known as "Pocket Rockets". These were claimed to be as effective as the larger cans but have an extremely bitter taste that, according to the V Pocket Rocket website, is to stop young children from drinking them.

==== Iced beverages ====
In 2018, V released two Iced Coffee and two Iced Chocolate drinks to the New Zealand and Australian market.

== Advertisement and promotions ==
The drink sponsored I'm a Celebrity...Get Me Out of Here! in the UK for its second series in 2003.

In 2015, V released a promotion called #VChat, where cans were sold with different letters of the alphabet which fans could use to spell out a wish or desire, submit a photo of it, and win whatever prize they spelled out.

In April 2018, V together with Australian donut store chain Donut King, released a V-flavoured donut. The donut was sold through Donut King stores nationwide and contained a gooey Guarana filling and covered in green sugar crystals.
