= 2003 EA Sports 500 =

29th race of 2003 NASCAR Winston Cup

Race details
- Race 29 of 36 in the 2003 NASCAR Winston Cup Series
- 2003 EA Sports 500 program cover, based on the cover for the NASCAR Thunder 2004 video game
- Date: September 28, 2003
- Official name: EA Sports 500
- Location: Talladega, Alabama, U.S.
- Course: Talladega Superspeedway
- Course length: 2.66 miles (4.28 km)
- Distance: 188 laps, 500.08 mi (804.801 km)
- Average speed: 156.045 miles per hour (251.130 km/h)
- Attendance: 170,000

Pole position
| Driver | Elliott Sadler | Robert Yates Racing |
- Time: 50.415 sec (189.943 mph, 305.684 km/h)

Most laps led
| Driver | Jeff Gordon | Hendrick Motorsports |
- Laps: 47

Winner
| No. 15 | Michael Waltrip | Dale Earnhardt, Inc. |

Television in the United States
- Network: NBC
- Announcers: Allen Bestwick, Benny Parsons, Wally Dallenbach Jr.

The 2003 EA Sports 500 was a NASCAR Winston Cup Series race that took place on September 28, 2003, at Talladega Superspeedway in Talladega, Alabama. It was the 29th race of the 2003 NASCAR Winston Cup Series.

== Race report ==
For this race only, Jasper Motorsports switched from Ford to Dodge, taking advantage of their engine building partnership with Team Penske (who switched from Ford to Dodge that season). As a result, Ford terminated their factory support agreement with the team following the race.

One of the most notable moments of the race is when on lap 182, Elliott Sadler would come down and hit Kurt Busch's right side of Busch's car. Elliott's car would spin and fly into the air, doing a full flip before landing on its roof. The car would slide down the backstretch grass into Turn 3, then proceeded to flip onto the Turn 3 surface 4 and a half times, before finally landing on the wheels of the car. Sadler was unhurt.

== Results ==
| Fin | St | # | Driver | Sponsor | Make | Laps | Led | Status | Pts |
|---|---|---|---|---|---|---|---|---|---|
| 1 | 18 | 15 | Michael Waltrip | NAPA Auto Parts | Chevy | 188 | 16 | running | 180 |
| 2 | 38 | 8 | Dale Earnhardt Jr. | Budweiser | Chevy | 188 | 3 | running | 175 |
| 3 | 11 | 20 | Tony Stewart | Home Depot | Chevy | 188 | 0 | running | 165 |
| 4 | 12 | 12 | Ryan Newman | Alltel | Dodge | 188 | 0 | running | 160 |
| 5 | 5 | 24 | Jeff Gordon | DuPont | Chevy | 188 | 47 | running | 165 |
| 6 | 39 | 97 | Kurt Busch | Lennox/Irwin Industrial Tools | Ford | 188 | 11 | running | 155 |
| 7 | 30 | 29 | Kevin Harvick | GM Goodwrench | Chevy | 188 | 4 | running | 151 |
| 8 | 17 | 32 | Ricky Craven | Tide | Pontiac | 188 | 0 | running | 142 |
| 9 | 33 | 2 | Rusty Wallace | Miller Lite | Dodge | 188 | 11 | running | 143 |
| 10 | 23 | 09 | Mike Wallace | Miccosukee Gaming & Resorts | Dodge | 188 | 0 | running | 134 |
| 11 | 10 | 18 | Bobby Labonte | Interstate Batteries | Chevy | 188 | 2 | running | 135 |
| 12 | 34 | 31 | Robby Gordon | Cingular Wireless | Chevy | 188 | 4 | running | 132 |
| 13 | 9 | 9 | Bill Elliott | Dodge Dealers, UAW | Dodge | 188 | 2 | running | 129 |
| 14 | 20 | 22 | Ward Burton | Caterpillar | Dodge | 188 | 8 | running | 126 |
| 15 | 24 | 90 | John Andretti | AOL 9.0 | Chevy | 188 | 0 | running | 118 |
| 16 | 2 | 42 | Jamie McMurray | Havoline | Dodge | 188 | 20 | running | 120 |
| 17 | 42 | 77 | Dave Blaney | Jasper Engines & Transmissions | Dodge | 188 | 0 | running | 112 |
| 18 | 13 | 43 | Jeff Green | Cheerios, Yu-Gi-Oh! | Dodge | 188 | 0 | running | 109 |
| 19 | 6 | 88 | Dale Jarrett | UPS | Ford | 188 | 0 | running | 106 |
| 20 | 19 | 23 | Kenny Wallace | Stacker 2 | Dodge | 188 | 0 | running | 103 |
| 21 | 7 | 49 | Ken Schrader | BAM Racing | Dodge | 188 | 0 | running | 100 |
| 22 | 14 | 5 | Terry Labonte | Kellogg's/got milk?, Winston Cup Victory Lap | Chevy | 188 | 1 | running | 102 |
| 23 | 15 | 6 | Mark Martin | Viagra | Ford | 188 | 0 | running | 94 |
| 24 | 36 | 16 | Greg Biffle | Grainger | Ford | 187 | 0 | running | 91 |
| 25 | 27 | 25 | Joe Nemechek | UAW-Delphi | Chevy | 187 | 0 | running | 88 |
| 26 | 43 | 1 | Jason Keller | Pennzoil | Chevy | 187 | 0 | running | 85 |
| 27 | 28 | 01 | Mike Skinner | USG Sheetrock | Pontiac | 186 | 0 | running | 82 |
| 28 | 26 | 44 | Christian Fittipaldi | Bugles | Dodge | 186 | 0 | running | 79 |
| 29 | 25 | 98 | Jason Jarrett | C.H.I. Overhead Doors | Ford | 184 | 0 | running | 76 |
| 30 | 1 | 38 | Elliott Sadler | M&M's | Ford | 181 | 23 | crash | 78 |
| 31 | 29 | 74 | Tony Raines | BACE Motorsports | Chevy | 179 | 0 | crash | 70 |
| 32 | 40 | 99 | Jeff Burton | Citgo | Ford | 168 | 1 | engine | 72 |
| 33 | 37 | 17 | Matt Kenseth | Smirnoff Ice Triple Black | Ford | 158 | 1 | engine | 69 |
| 34 | 3 | 48 | Jimmie Johnson | Lowe's | Chevy | 157 | 15 | engine | 66 |
| 35 | 21 | 60 | David Green | NetZero/Haas Automation | Chevy | 150 | 0 | crash | 58 |
| 36 | 32 | 21 | Ricky Rudd | Motorcraft | Ford | 138 | 0 | engine | 55 |
| 37 | 8 | 41 | Casey Mears | Target | Dodge | 113 | 0 | overheating | 52 |
| 38 | 22 | 19 | Jeremy Mayfield | Dodge Dealers, UAW | Dodge | 104 | 0 | running | 49 |
| 39 | 4 | 40 | Sterling Marlin | Coors Light | Dodge | 103 | 0 | overheating | 46 |
| 40 | 16 | 00 | Buckshot Jones | Crown Fiber | Chevy | 88 | 19 | crash | 48 |
| 41 | 41 | 10 | Johnny Benson Jr. | Valvoline | Pontiac | 29 | 0 | crash | 40 |
| 42 | 31 | 7 | Jimmy Spencer | Sirius Satellite Radio | Dodge | 11 | 0 | crash | 37 |
| 43 | 35 | 14 | Larry Foyt | Harrah's | Dodge | 9 | 0 | crash | 34 |
Failed to qualify or withdrew
| POS | NAME | NBR | SPONSOR | OWNER | CAR | | | | |
| 44 | Kyle Petty | 45 | Georgia-Pacific | Petty Enterprises | Dodge | | | | |
| 45 | Kevin Lepage | 4 | Kodak | Larry McClure | Pontiac | | | | |
| 46 | Jason Leffler | 0 | NetZero Hi Speed | Gene Haas | Pontiac | | | | |
| 47 | Mike Bliss | 80 | Advair | Joe Gibbs | Chevrolet | | | | |
| 48 | Steve Park | 30 | America Online | Richard Childress | Chevrolet | | | | |
| 49 | Todd Bodine | 54 | National Guard | Travis Carter | Ford | | | | |
| WD | Morgan Shepherd | 89 | Racing With Jesus / Red Line Oil | Morgan Shepherd | Ford | | | | |
