= Suntory Oceania =

Beverage company

- Type: Subsidiary
- Industry: Beverage
- Founded: 1962; 64 years ago
- Founder: NZ Apple and Pear Board
- Headquarters: Sydney, Australia
- Area served: New Zealand; Australia
- Key people: Daisuke Minato (CEO); Tsutomu Santoki (CFO)
- Products: V Energy Drink, Mizone, Just Juice, Pepsi, Pepsi Max, Boss Coffee, Maximus, Rockstar, Gatorade, NZ Natural, FreshUp, Mountain Dew, 7 Up, The Real McCoy, h2go, Ribena, Lucozade, G-Force, Up & Go
- Services: Distributor and Manufacturer of Beverages
- Number of employees: Over 1,500
- Parent: Suntory
- Website: www.suntoryoceania.com

Suntory Oceania, formerly known as Frucor and Frucor Suntory, is a Japanese-owned beverage company operating in Australasia, and headquartered in Sydney, Australia and Auckland, New Zealand. The company is known for its V energy drink launched in 1997, which is sold across the world including Europe, South Africa and Argentina. Suntory Oceania partners with PepsiCo and Sanitarium in the region.

== History ==
Frucor was founded by New Zealand Apple and Pear Board in 1962 and released their first product, Fresh Up. In 1978, New Zealand Olympic track runner John Walker endorsed the Fresh Up product, with the catchphrase "Fresh Up – it's got to be good for you'". Frucor was owned by New Zealand Apple and Pear Board until 1998, when it was purchased for $50 million by Pacific Equity Partners. In 1999, Frucor became the exclusive bottler for Pepsi products in New Zealand. In 2000 Frucor launched V in the UK and Ireland manufactured in the Netherlands.

In 2001, Forbes named Frucor in its Top 20 Companies of 2002. In January 2002, Groupe Danone purchased Frucor for $294 million after bidding since October 2001 and being rejected by Frucor in the beginning. That same year, Frucor acquired the Australian fruit juice company Spring Valley from Bonlac Foods (now Fonterra).

In 2007, Frucor partnered with MySpace to host a job promotions campaign with participants Rolling Stone, Billabong. The collaboration with MySpace and the job promoters was the first of its type in Australia. In October 2008, Groupe Danone sold Frucor to Japanese company Suntory for over €600 million.

In January 2011, Frucor launched the V brand in Spain, where by June, was already being sold in 8,000 outlets.

In 2013, Frucor sponsored the IGN Australia Black Beta Select Awards. In June 2017 Frucor Beverages was renamed Frucor Suntory to align better with its parent company Suntory.

In 2024, it was announced that Frucor Suntory would enter a partnership with Suntory Global Spirits in the Oceania region, with the entity being renamed Suntory Oceania.

== Products ==
Suntory Oceania's diversified portfolio of products includes carbonated soft drinks, spring water, sports drink and energy drinks, fruit juices, iced tea, flavoured milk, coffee, tea and alcohol. Suntory Oceania distributes a number of sparkling, still and other beverages. Some of these include:

Non-alcoholic beverages

- V (drink)
- Boss Coffee
- Maximus (Sports drink)
- Ribena
- Mccoy
- Just Juice
- Fresh-Up
- Pepsi Max
- Pepsi
- Mountain Dew
- 7Up
- Gatorade
- Rockstar Energy Drinks
- Lucozade
- NZ Natural
- h2go
- Mizone
- GForce
- Up & Go

Alcoholic beverages

- Strong Zero
- Canadian Club
- Jim Beam
- Roku Gin
- Haku Vodka
