= Functional food =

Food modified for a presumed health benefit

A functional food or designer food, also called fortified food, is a food claimed to have an additional benefit beyond just nutrition (often one related to health promotion or disease prevention) by modifying the cultivation of the native food or by adding ingredients during manufacturing.

The term applies to traits purposely bred into existing edible plants, such as purple or gold potatoes having increased anthocyanin or carotenoid contents, respectively. Functional food manufacturing has the intent "to have physiological benefits and/or reduce the risk of chronic disease beyond basic nutritional functions, and may be similar in appearance to conventional food and consumed as part of a regular diet".

The term also applies to food processing practices which include ingredients purposely added with the intent to improve the food health value and for marketing to specific consumer groups.

The term was first used in the 1980s in Japan, where a government approval process for functional foods called Foods for Specified Health Use (FOSHU) exists.

In the European Union, functional foods are conceptual rather than designated as a specific food category. The European Commission’s initiatives, such as the Concerted Action on Functional Food Science in Europe (FUFOSE) and the European Food Safety Authority (EFSA), define functional foods as those that beneficially impact body functions beyond nutrition, contributing to improved health or disease risk reduction.

== Definition ==
In 1998, the European Commission’s Concerted Action on Functional Food Science in Europe proposed in a European consensus document a working definition of functional food:

"A food can be regarded as functional if it is satisfactorily demonstrated to affect beneficially one or more target functions in the body, beyond adequate nutritional effects, in a way that is relevant to either improved stage of health and well-being and/or reduction of risk of disease. A functional food must remain food and it must demonstrate its effects in amounts that can normally be expected to be consumed in the diet: it is not a pill or a capsule, but part of the normal food pattern."

The concept includes the following unique features of a functional food:

- being a conventional or everyday food,
- being consumed as part of the normal/usual diet,
- composed of naturally occurring (as opposed to synthetic) components, perhaps in unnatural concentration or present in foods that would not normally supply them,
- having a positive effect on target function(s) beyond nutritive value/basic nutrition,
- may enhance well-being and health and/or reduce the risk of disease or provide health benefit so as to improve the quality of life, including physical, psychologic, and behavioral performances,
- having authorized and scientifically based claims.

A functional food can be:

- a natural food,
- a food to which a component has been added,
- a food from which a component has been removed,
- a food where the nature of one or more components has been modified,
- a food in which the bioavailability of one or more components has been modified, or
- any combination of these possibilities.

The 33rd European Nutrition and Dietetics Conference in July 2026 simply uses the definition "food that's designed to possess some health advantages apart from its traditional nutritional value".

== Relationship to related terms ==
Functional foods are commonly distinguished from dietary supplements because they are consumed as part of a normal diet rather than as pills, capsules, or other supplement formats. The concept overlaps with nutraceuticals, fortified foods, and medical foods, but these terms may have different meanings in scientific, commercial, and regulatory contexts. Functional foods are generally presented as conventional foods or beverages that contain, lack, or are modified to include components associated with potential health benefits.

== Types and examples ==
Functional foods may include naturally occurring foods with components associated with health effects, foods enriched with additional ingredients, foods from which a component has been removed or reduced, and foods in which the bioavailability of one or more components has been modified. Examples discussed in functional food literature include foods enriched with phytosterols, probiotic or prebiotic yogurts, products with modified fatty-acid composition, and plant varieties bred for higher concentrations of nutrients.

== Regulatory status ==
The term "functional food" is not uniformly defined in law, and regulatory treatment varies by jurisdiction. In the United States, functional foods are not recognized as a separate regulatory category by the Food and Drug Administration; products described as functional foods may be regulated as conventional foods, dietary supplements, or drugs depending on their ingredients, intended use, and marketing claims.

In the European Union, functional foods are treated as a conceptual category rather than a specific legal class of food. Nutrition and health claims made for foods are regulated under EU rules requiring claims to be clear and supported by scientific evidence. The European Food Safety Authority evaluates the scientific substantiation of proposed health claims, while the European Commission and Member States decide whether claims may be authorized.

In Japan, functional food regulation includes the Foods for Specified Health Use system, which provides a government approval pathway for foods making specified health claims.

== Ingredients and market trends ==
Common ingredients intended to be functional when added to foods include polyunsaturated fatty acids, probiotics, prebiotics, vitamins with antioxidant properties, and protein.

As of 2025, leading product trends and motivations for choosing functional foods are for energy drinks, healthy aging, active living, and weight loss, among several others.

== Health claim status ==
Presumed benefits of making foods more functional or healthful have not been scientifically established, and specific statements of health claims are regulated on food labels in the European Union, United States and Canada. Studies have shown that certain functional foods provide health benefits and prevent diseases. However, safety considerations should be paramount. Safety concerns have been raised on the addition of certain botanicals to food like beverages, cereals and soups some of which pose health risks to consumers.

In 2001, the FDA issued letters warning the food industry concerning the use of certain "novel ingredients" in conventional foods.

== Industry ==
In the United States in 2024, retail sales of functional food and beverage products totaled $320 billion, with estimates for growth to $384 billion by 2028.

== See also ==
- Food fortification
- Novel food
- Functional beverage
- Medical food, specially formulated foods to treat diseases with distinctive nutritional needs
