= Manpasand Beverages =

Limited liability company in India

Manpasand Beverages Limited
- Type: Public
- Traded as: BSE: 539207; NSE: MANPASAND
- Industry: Food and Beverage
- Founded: 1998
- Founder: Mr. Dhirendra Singh
- Headquarters: Vadodara, Gujarat, India
- Area served: PAN India
- Key people: Dhirendra Singh (Chairman & MD); Abhishek Singh (Whole Time Director)
- Products: Mango Sip, Fruitsup, OXY Sip, Manpasand ORS
- Revenue: ▲₹717.11 crore (US$ 106 million)(2017)
- Website: www.manpasand.co.in

Manpasand Beverages Limited is a limited liability company in India. It owns brands such as MangoSip, Fruits Up, Manpasand ORS, and OXY Sip. Its MangoSip brand was the 2nd largest selling mango drink in India in 2014.

== History ==
Manpasand Beverages was established in 1998 by Dhirendra Singh. Mr. Singh leased a factory formerly run by Mahananda Dairy in Mumbai to produce MangoSip, and began selling it in smaller tier-2, semi-rural, and rural markets that were ignored by the existing large beverage companies.

The company realized the potential its flagship brand MangoSip had after succeeding in Uttar Pradesh. The same distribution formula helped them to grow the number of distributors steadily in other parts of India.

In 2011, venture capital company SAIF Partners purchased 25% of the company.

== Future ==
Homegrown beverage company Manpasand Beverages is investing Rs 150 crore to set up a new manufacturing facility in South India largest Private Industrial park Sri City located at Chittoor district Andhra Pradesh in order to cater to the demands of southern markets. The Company is also setting up a fruit juice manufacturing facility at Chhatabar Industrial Area, Khurdha in Odisha, at an investment of Rs 150 crore. The new plant is a part of Company's expansion plans which are on at full swing. This would be the Company's ninth facility in the country, and will have a capacity of 50,000 cases per day.

== Products ==
=== Mango Sip ===
The Mango Sip brand was established by Dhirendra Singh. The company has signed up Hindi film actor Sunny Deol as the brand ambassador.

=== Fruitsup ===
The Fruits Up line of premium fruits drinks includes varieties such as guava, lichi, mango, apple, orange and mixed fruits.

Taapsee Pannu is Manpasand Beverages' new brand ambassador for FruitsUp.

=== OXY Sip ===
OXY Sip is a packaged drinking water brand launched in 2017 by Manpasand Beverages Ltd.

=== Manpasand ORS ===
Launched in 2014, Manpasand ORS is ready-to-drink oral rehydration salts sports drink. It is available in apple and orange flavors. It comes in 200 ml. tetra pack that is designed to be carried in a water belt and be consumed during exercise.
