= 5-hour Energy =

Energy shot drink

- Type: Energy shot
- Manufacturer: Living Essentials
- Origin: United States
- Introduced: 2004; 22 years ago
- Website: 5hourenergy.com

5-hour Energy (stylized as 5-hour ENERGY) is an energy shot manufactured by Living Essentials LLC. The company was founded by CEO Manoj Bhargava and product launched in 2004.

== Ingredients ==
The official website lists the active ingredients of 5-hour Energy as: vitamin B6, folic acid, vitamin B12, sodium, taurine, glucuronolactone, malic acid and N-Acetyl L-tyrosine, L-phenylalanine, caffeine, and citicoline. The product is not U.S Food and Drug Administration approved. It contains no sugar, instead providing the stimulant caffeine and the psychoactive dopamine precursor amino acids tyrosine and phenylalanine. According to an article in Consumer Reports, 5-hour Energy should be avoided by children under the age of 12 and as well as nursing or pregnant women.

== History ==
In 2004 Manoj Bhargava's company, Living Essentials LLC, launched a product called "5-Hour Energy". By 2012, retail sales had grown to an estimated $1 billion.

A March 2011 article in Consumer Reports reported that, according to a lab test, a 2-US-fluid-ounce (59 ml) 5-Hour Energy contained 207 milligrams of caffeine, slightly more than an 8 US fl oz (240 ml) serving of Starbucks coffee which contains 180 mg of caffeine. (It is not clear whether the "Original" or "Extra Strength" product was tested.) The directions on the 5-Hour bottle recommend taking half of the contents (103 mg of caffeine) for regular use, and the whole bottle for extra energy. A regular cup of coffee has less than 100 mg/250 ml cup.

In 2012, Forbes magazine commissioned an independent lab to analyze the contents within full bottles of 5-Hour Energy. The findings showed that the regular strength 5-Hour Energy contained 157 mg of caffeine, whereas the Extra Strength version had a caffeine content of 206 mg.

In December 2012, Consumer Reports published an article on 27 energy drinks including 5-hour Energy, which compared the caffeine content of the 27 drinks. Caffeine levels in 5-hour Energy are: Decaf (6 mg), Original (215 mg), and Extra Strength (242 mg). The publication also reviewed a double blind study and reported that "5-Hour Energy will probably chase away grogginess at least as well as a cup of coffee" and that "little if any research" indicated that amino acids and B vitamins would result in a difference in energy level.

In October 2021, 5-hour Energy announced the launch of a new 16-ounce carbonated energy beverage.

== Legal issues ==
A lawsuit against Living Essentials was filed in 2010, alleging health hazards and deceptive labeling. The case was voluntarily dismissed in December 2011.

In 2012, the media reported that the FDA was investigating allegations that Bhargava's 5-Hour Energy product was "potentially linked" to the deaths of 20 of its consumers.

A 2014 article in The New York Times reported that 5-hour Energy was lobbying state attorneys general in 30 states after being investigated for deceptive advertising. The New York Times report also revealed the company made contributions totaling $280,000 to the political funds of state attorneys general "after the investigation into false claims and deceptive marketing [...] opened in January 2013." A 2015 report by the Center for Public Integrity (CPI) said that the attorney general offices in five US states had filed cases against Living Essentials for "deceptive marketing practices" and that additional class-action lawsuits were pending in seven states.

In 2016, it won a $22 million lawsuit against Stacker 2 arguing that their "6-Hour Power" product branding was too similar to its "5-Hour Energy" trademark.

Living Essentials was found liable for deceptive practices under the Consumer Protection Act in Washington state in 2017. The court ordered the company to pay $4.3 million. The violations included stating that doctors recommended the product, that the product was superior to coffee, and that the decaffeinated product provided long lasting energy and alertness. The companies' communications director, Melissa Skabich, said they will appeal.

"Unlike the two other courts that found in our favor, this court did not follow the law. We intend to vigorously pursue our right to appeal, and correct the trial court’s incorrect application of the law," she said.

In 2018 a suit was filed against Living Essentials, under the claim that it offered Costco preferential pricing, discounts, and rebates. However, in October 2019 a California federal jury found that Living Essentials did not violate federal antitrust law by selling its 5-Hour Energy product to Costco for a lower price than the one charged to its competitors.
