= 2003 New England 300 =

Race details
- Race 19 of 36 in the 2003 NASCAR Winston Cup Series season
- Date: July 20, 2003
- Location: New Hampshire International Speedway, Loudon, New Hampshire
- Course: Permanent racing facility
- Course length: 1.058 miles (1.702 km)
- Distance: 300 laps, 317.4 mi (510.805 km)
- Average speed: 96.924 miles per hour (155.984 km/h)

Pole position
Driver	Matt Kenseth	Roush Racing
- Time: no time trials

Most laps led
Driver	Jeff Gordon	Hendrick Motorsports
- Laps: 133

Winner
No. 48	Jimmie Johnson	Hendrick Motorsports

Television in the United States
- Network: TNT
- Announcers: Allen Bestwick, Benny Parsons, & Wally Dallenbach Jr.

The 2003 New England 300 was a NASCAR Winston Cup Series race held on July 20, 2003, at New Hampshire International Speedway, in Loudon, New Hampshire. Contested over 300 laps on the 1.058-mile (1.703 km) speedway, it was the 19th race of the 2003 NASCAR Winston Cup Series season.

Jimmie Johnson of Hendrick Motorsports won the race.

== Background ==
New Hampshire International Speedway is a 1.058-mile (1.703 km) oval speedway located in Loudon, New Hampshire which has hosted NASCAR racing annually since the early 1990s, as well as an IndyCar weekend and the oldest motorcycle race in North America, the Loudon Classic. Nicknamed "The Magic Mile", the speedway is often converted into a 1.6-mile (2.6 km) road course, which includes much of the oval. The track was originally the site of Bryar Motorsports Park before being purchased and redeveloped by Bob Bahre. The track is currently one of eight major NASCAR tracks owned and operated by Speedway Motorsports.

== Results ==
Pos	No.	Driver	Team	Manufacturer	Sponsor	Laps	Laps led	Status
1	48	Jimmie Johnson	Hendrick Motorsports	Chevrolet	Lowe's	300	58	Running
2	29	Kevin Harvick	Richard Childress Racing	Chevrolet	GM Goodwrench	300	53	Running
3	17	Matt Kenseth	Roush Racing	Ford	DeWalt Power Tools	300	1	Running
4	12	Ryan Newman	Penske Racing	Dodge	Alltel	300	29	Running
5	31	Robby Gordon	Richard Childress Racing	Chevrolet	Cingular Wireless	300	0	Running
6	8	Dale Earnhardt Jr.	Dale Earnhardt, Inc.	Chevrolet	Budweiser	300	2	Running
7	88	Dale Jarrett	Robert Yates Racing	Ford	UPS	300	0	Running
8	30	Steve Park	Richard Childress Racing	Chevrolet	America Online	300	0	Running
9	99	Jeff Burton	Roush Racing	Ford	Citgo / Bassmaster Classic	300	10	Running
10	16	Greg Biffle	Roush Racing	Ford	Grainger	300	0	Running
11	97	Kurt Busch	Roush Racing	Ford	Rubbermaid	300	0	Running
12	21	Ricky Rudd	Wood Brothers Racing	Ford	Motorcraft	300	0	Running
13	77	Dave Blaney	Jasper Motorsports	Ford	Jasper Engines & Transmissions	300	0	Running
14	18	Bobby Labonte	Joe Gibbs Racing	Chevrolet	Interstate Batteries	300	0	Running
15	7	Jimmy Spencer	Ultra Motorsports	Dodge	Sirius Satellite Radio	300	1	Running
16	41	Casey Mears	Chip Ganassi Racing	Dodge	Target	300	0	Running
17	2	Rusty Wallace	Penske Racing	Dodge	Miller Lite	300	0	Running
18	6	Mark Martin	Roush Racing	Ford	Viagra	300	0	Running
19	54	Todd Bodine	BelCar Motorsports	Ford	National Guard	300	0	Running
20	5	Terry Labonte	Hendrick Motorsports	Chevrolet	Kellogg's / Got Milk?	300	0	Running
21	32	Ricky Craven	PPI Motorsports	Pontiac	Tide	300	0	Running
22	20	Tony Stewart	Joe Gibbs Racing	Chevrolet	Home Depot	300	0	Running
23	4	Johnny Sauter	Morgan–McClure Motorsports	Pontiac	Kodak Easy Share	300	0	Running
24	24	Jeff Gordon	Hendrick Motorsports	Chevrolet	DuPont	300	133	Running
25	22	Ward Burton	Bill Davis Racing	Dodge	Caterpillar	299	0	Running
26	10	Johnny Benson Jr.	MB2 Motorsports	Pontiac	Valvoline	299	0	Running
27	38	Elliott Sadler	Robert Yates Racing	Ford	M&M's	299	0	Running
28	15	Michael Waltrip	Dale Earnhardt Inc.	Chevrolet	NAPA Auto Parts	299	0	Running
29	25	Joe Nemechek	Hendrick Motorsports	Chevrolet	UAW–Delphi	299	0	Running
30	1	Jeff Green	Dale Earnhardt Inc.	Chevrolet	Pennzoil	299	0	Running
31	9	Bill Elliott	Evernham Motorsports	Dodge	Dodge Dealers / UAW	299	0	Running
32	45	Kyle Petty	Petty Enterprises	Dodge	Georgia-Pacific / Brawny	299	0	Running
33	74	Tony Raines	BACE Motorsports	Chevrolet	BACE Motorsports	297	0	Running
34	19	Jeremy Mayfield	Evernham Motorsports	Dodge	Dodge Dealers / UAW	296	0	Running
35	37	Derrike Cope	Quest Motor Racing	Chevrolet	Friendly's	295	0	Running
36	49	Ken Schrader	BAM Racing	Dodge	AT&T	292	0	Running
37	43	Christian Fittipaldi	Petty Enterprises	Dodge	Cheerios	268	0	Running
38	23	Kenny Wallace	Bill Davis Racing	Dodge	Stacker 2 / YJ Stinger	260	0	Running
39	40	Sterling Marlin	Chip Ganassi Racing	Dodge	Coors Light	196	0	Crash
40	42	Jamie McMurray	Chip Ganassi Racing	Dodge	Havoline	195	13	Crash
41	0	John Andretti	Haas CNC Racing	Pontiac	NetZero Hi Speed	179	0	Running
42	01	Mike Wallace	MB2 Motorsports	Pontiac	U.S. Army	118	0	Crash
43	89	Morgan Shepherd	Shepherd Racing Ventures	Ford	Racing for Jesus / Red Line Oil	43	0	Brakes

=== Failed to qualify ===
- David Reutimann (#04)
- Carl Long (#46)
- Larry Foyt (#50)
- Tim Sauter (#71)

== Race Statistics ==
- Time of race: 3:16:29
- Average Speed: 96.924 miles per hour (155.984 km/h)
- Pole Speed: no time trials
- Cautions: 12 for 63 laps
- Margin of Victory: 1.582 sec
- Lead changes: 14
- Percent of race run under caution: 21%
- Average green flag run: 18.2 laps

Lap leaders
Laps	Leader
1	Matt Kenseth
2	Jeff Gordon
3–4	Dale Earnhardt Jr.
5–62	Jeff Gordon
63	Jimmy Spencer
64–79	Kevin Harvick
80–100	Jimmie Johnson
101–146	Jeff Gordon
147–159	Jamie McMurray
160–196	Kevin Harvick
197	Jeff Gordon
198–207	Jeff Burton
208–234	Jeff Gordon
235–263	Ryan Newman
264–300	Jimmie Johnson

Total laps led
Laps led	Driver
133	Jeff Gordon
58	Jimmie Johnson
53	Kevin Harvick
29	Ryan Newman
13	Jamie McMurray
10	Jeff Burton
2	Dale Earnhardt Jr.
1	Matt Kenseth
1	Jimmy Spencer

Cautions: 12 for 63 laps
Laps	Reason
10–15	#0 (Andretti), #4 (Sauter), & #49 (Schrader) accident turn 1
22–27	Debris backstraight
62–65	#40 (Marlin) accident turn 3
101–107	Debris
110–113	#2 (R. Wallace) spin backstraight
118–121	#01 (M. Wallace) spin backstraight
146–150	#19 (Mayfield) accident turn 1
154–156	#23 (K. Wallace) & #99 (J. Burton) accident turn 4
166–169	Debris
197–202	#42 (McMurray) accident frontstraight
204–211	Debris
234–239	#43 (Fittipaldi) crash frontstraight
