= Energizer Brands =

Beverage Company

Energizer Brands' first healthy natural energy beverage without caffeine or taurine: Attitude

Energizer Brands Limited, is - was - an English beverage company.

Energizer Brands launched attitude drink, in July 2008. The company claims to have made the soft drinks sector's first 100% natural functional beverage energy drink that contains no caffeine or taurine and no added sugar. The formula contains natural ingredients and antioxidants.

The formula contains 500 mg of Rhodiola rosea root extract (more commonly known as golden root), and 500 mg of L-carnitine. Attitude drink contains natural sugars from fruits which are low in glycemic index (GI), this has been certified by a research group from Oxford Brookes University in 2007.

The drink is marketed at healthy, active individuals and is sold in the British multiples Waitrose and Holland & Barrett. Energizer Brands sponsored the 2008 Notting Hill Carnival- Europe's largest street carnival.

The drink's packaging is manufactured by the British Packaging company Rexam Plc, who have manufactured the world's first aluminium can with a five colour printed end, of which attitude drink is the first customer.

The French newspaper Le Figaro quoted attitude drink as the "Green Red Bull" in January 2010.
