= Mizone =

Australasian flavoured sports drink brand

- Type: Sports drink
- Manufacturer: Frucor Suntory
- Origin: New Zealand
- Introduced: 2000; 26 years ago
- Website: frucorsuntory.com/mizone

Mizone, also known as Mizone Sports Water, is a formulated sports drink manufactured by Frucor Suntory, a Japanese-owned beverage company operating in Australasia. It is known as Maidong (脉动) in China and B'lue in Thailand, Indonesia, and the Philippines.

== History ==
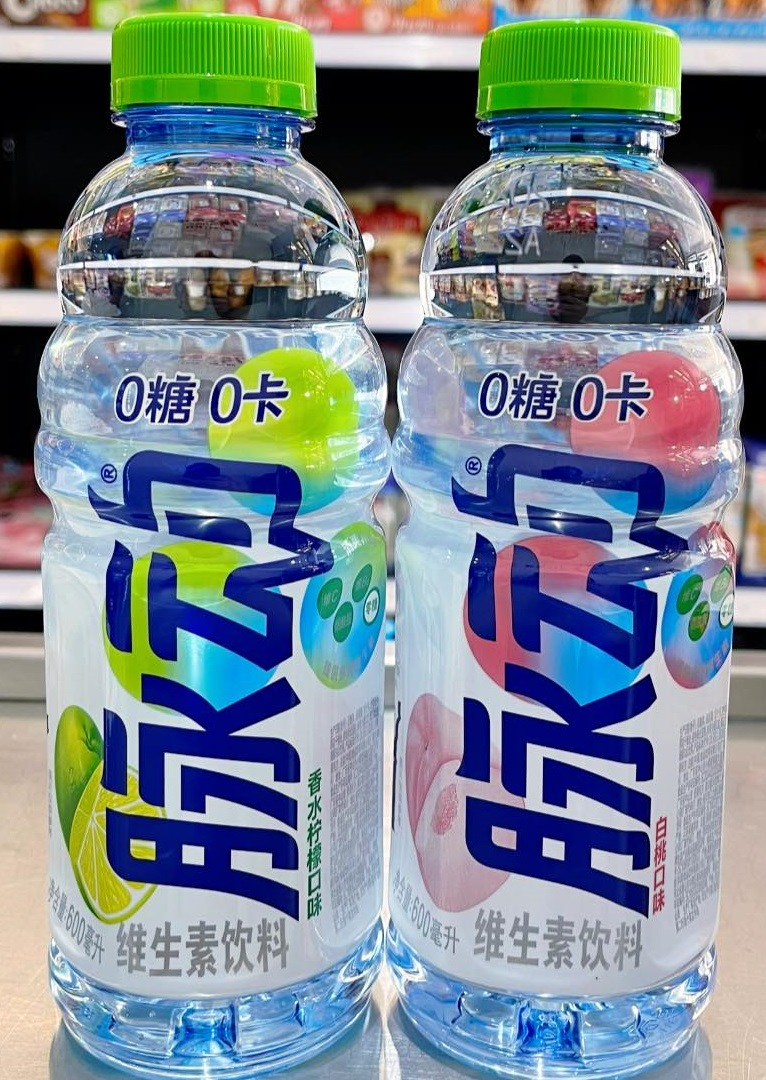
'Maidong', Chinese range of the drink

The flavoured sports water was launched by Frucor in New Zealand in October 2000. In the first 9 weeks of its launch in New Zealand, Mizone accomplished 15% market share in petrol stations, which was a hortative sign for the water business. In 2003, Frucor's parent company Danone released the drink in China, and Chinese company Robust Co Ltd adapted the product under the name 'Maidong', which means "pulse". The product began to be popular with those residing in urban areas. A year after its creation, 'Maidong' became the best-selling energy-drink and was named China's beverage of the year. In 2006, the drink had a strong start in Indonesia under the Mizone brand.

In 2014, due to the influx of new sports drinks and water brands, Mizone launched a new campaign with the slogan "More than Water" to represent the drink as the modern man's hydration and to have drinking plain water appear to be an outdated way to hydrate one's self.

In 2018, after the drink's declination in Australia, its brand was relaunched via a campaign that featured Australian cricketer and soccer player Ellyse Perry, with the slogan "find your zone". As of 2023, Fructor Suntory has indefinitely ceased to distribute Mizone in Australia. (Note: The Chinese range 'Maidong' is found in Asian supermarkets across the country.) In October 2023, Mizone was revamped in China, after its underperformance in the country, by releasing Mizone Electrolyte +, a grapefruit-flavoured variant aimed for those who want to increase their electrolyte intake.

== Products ==
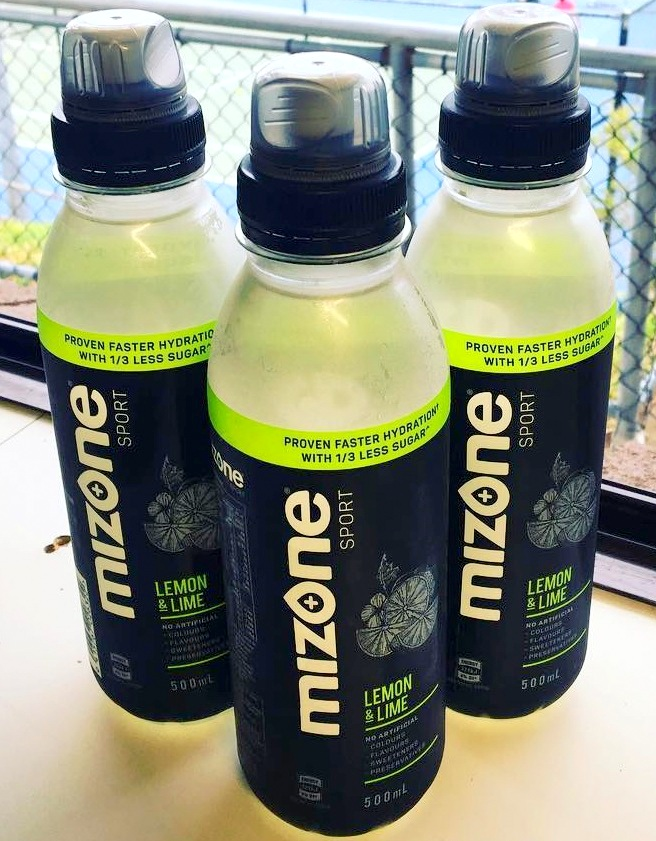
Lemon and lime-flavoured range, introduced in 2018

Mizone Lime Flavoured Still Water
Nutritional value per 750 millilitres (25 US fl oz)
- Energy: 116.6 kcal (488 kJ)
- Carbohydrates: 27.9
- Sugars: 27.9
- Dietary fiber: 0
- Fat: 0
- Protein: 0
Vitamins and minerals
Minerals	Quantity %DV^{†}
Potassium	0% 0 mg
Sodium	7% 170 mg
- ^{†}Percentages estimated using US recommendations for adults, except for potassium, which is estimated based on expert recommendation from the National Academies.

Mizone comes in 750mL transparent, somewhat curved, blue plastic bottles that have depressions made for fingers at the bottom half. The bottles feature a blue flip and flow lid that opens to a nozzle. In Australia, a 800ml sipper bottle was available when the drink was first launched in 2001.

In Australia, Mizone Active Water came in lime, blackcurrant, mandarin and raspberry, while the product in New Zealand was made up of lime, passionfruit, mandarin and crisp apple. Mizone Isopower was available only in New Zealand. The drink had two low-carb flavours, Raspberry Rush and Lemon Lime Charge, which are discontinued. The last range was Mizone Rapid, launched in 2007 and discontinued in 2011.

In 2016, Mizone Activ was launched in Indonesia, targeted to the sports community. In 2017, Mizone expanded its product line in China, where it included two new flavours; cactus green orange and sea salt mango, including a new merchandise line titled "blazing energy," which is high in taurine and plant extracts. In 2019, also in China, Mizone introduced three new products; taurine, ginseng and fiber.

In New Zealand, the drink comes in three flavours; lime, mandarin and crisp apple, as per the official website. (Note: The official Australasian website of Fructor, linked in the infobox, lists three flavours of the drink.) In Indonesia, the drink currently comes in cherry blossom, cranberry, starfruit and lychee lemon flavours.

=== Ingredients ===
A blend of purified water and natural fruit flavours, Mizone features antioxidant, vitamins (vitamin C, vitamin B_{3}, vitamin B_{5}, vitamin B_{6}, vitamin B_{12}), electrolytes, vitamin B, carbohydrates (glucose, fructose and sucrose), sodium chloride, citric acid, apple cider vinegar, in addition to variants and ranges of the drink that have come with flavours such as apple, blackcurrant, passionfruit, raspberry, mandarin, lemon/lime, strawberry and watermelon, throughout the course of its history. Furthermore, the drink does not contain artificial colours or preservatives and it has a third less sugar than other sport drinks.

== Advertising ==
In 2011, Danone launched 'Ur Flava' in Indonesia, partnering with Admax Network, with the aim to expand the brand beyond the beverage category and capture the young professional markets.
