= Accelerade =

Sports drink brand

- Type: Sports drink
- Manufacturer: www.pacifichealthlabs.com
- Origin: United Kingdom
- Introduced: 1999

Accelerade is a non-carbonated sports drink made by Pacific Health Laboratories. It is claimed to contain carbohydrates and proteins in a 4:1 ratio.
