= Sqwincher =

Electrolyte beverage company from Mississippi, USA

- Product type: Sports drink
- Current owner: Nathan Hardwick
- Country: United States
- Introduced: 1975
- Markets: United States, Canada, Australia, New Zealand & Costa Rica
- Website: Sqwincher.com

The Sqwincher Corporation is an electrolyte beverage manufacturer founded in 1975 in Columbus, Mississippi. The manufacturing facility is located in Columbus, MS and headquarters in Muscatine, IA (Kent Precision Foods Group). Sqwincher products are now sold throughout the U.S. as well as select international markets located in Canada, Australia, New Zealand, Costa Rica and Mexico. The company also has a unique distribution model. Rather than trying to compete with the Gatorades of the world in the mass market, Sqwincher sought to market its products to ‘professional’ users, such as electrical utility or construction companies whose workers who are often laboring outside on hot days and need adequate hydration to maintain energy, mental focus and to avoid heat exhaustion. The company also markets direct to consumers.

Sqwincher was founded in 1975 with the first high potassium, lower sodium drinks. But the company’s first breakthrough came in the decision to target a different audience, and to become as the company says “a hydration safety product for the industrial market.” The company exhibits at a number of trade shows that cater to industrial markets and outdoor enthusiasts.

== History ==
The company was founded by Mack Howard in 1975. Howard was motivated by the belief that Gatorade should have a competitor. He crafted the drink based on the advice of a friend, a sports trainer. The friend suggested that he make a drink with a higher composition of potassium and a lower composition of sodium. A sports aficionado, Howard concocted the drink Sqwincher. Mack Howard's sons Cal and Tommy joined the company in 1985 and 1987, respectively. In the middle of the 1990s, the two brothers bought the business from their father. After a scandal involving the two brothers Sqwincher was acquired by Tommy’s nephew Nathan Hardwick in September 2015.

== Products ==
Sqwincher is a "scientifically formulated electrolyte replacement drink". In other words, the drink is "formulated to replace mineral salts and replenish fluids and sugars". In the 1980s, Sqwincher was United States Football League's official drink. In 1983, members of the American football team, the New Jersey Generals, drank Sqwincher for their meal before each game. The Generals' trainer, Bob Vann, said, "Sqwincher contains potassium and sodium supplements necessary in hot weather."

Company president Tommy Howard said in a 2002 interview with the Mississippi Business Journal that being the USFL's official drink gave the company "retail exposure". He lamented, however, that it was a "dangerous thing to do unless you have a bottomless pit of money". In the middle of that decade, Sqwincher had little retail success as a sports drink for several years but eventually became successful when billed as a drink for blue-collar workers.

Sqwincher's product Quik Stik is a "small packet of sugar-free, powdered drink mix, about the size of a three-piece package of Sweet Tarts". During the Iraq War, Pat Reardon of beverage distributor Hagemeyer North America began a fundraising campaign to buy Quik Stiks to give to soldiers in Iraq where the temperature is frequently hot. Sqwincher gave Reardon a discount, selling the drink at a cost of $100 per case, each of which contained 1,000 servings. It also paid for the shipping of the drinks to United Service Organizations, which would distribute them to the soldiers.

In the 21st century, Sqwincher products are retailed in the United States, Canada, Australia, New Zealand, Costa Rica and México.
