= Staminade =

Australian sports drink

- Type: Sports drink
- Manufacturer: Steric
- Distributor: Steric
- Origin: Australia, worldwide
- Introduced: 1964
- Website: www.staminade.com.au

Staminade is the first sports drink to be commercially manufactured and marketed in Australia, available in Australian retail outlets since 1964. Staminade is owned by an Australian company, Steric Trading Pty Ltd and manufactured in Villawood, New South Wales, Australia.

== Sports drink ==
Staminade is a sports drink as described under standard 2.6.2 in the Australia New Zealand Food Standards Code.

== Powder ==
A 585-gm tub of Staminade powder made nine litres of Staminade drink when mixed with water. Directions for mixing recommended that one scoop of powder be mixed with 250ml chilled or iced water.

Staminade produced 19g powder sachets (one sachet makes up 350ml) and a one kilogram powder tub which made up to 21 litres of sports drink. These two options were only available to wholesale food service customers.

Since 2015, Staminade has only been available as a powder in 550g tubs with a changed formulation using sucrose as the primary ingredient.

== Concentrate ==
In 2005, Staminade concentrate was available in a 750-ml bottle.

From September 2013 to 2015, Staminade concentrate was packaged in a one-litre bottle which made five litres of Staminade drink. Directions for mixing recommended that 50ml of concentrate be mixed with 200ml of water to make 250ml of sports drink. Its primary non-water ingredient was glucose.

The concentrate is now discontinued.

== Staminade flavours ==
- Lemon lime fusion (powder)
- Wild berry rush (powder)
- Orange blast (powder)
- True Blue (discontinued)

== Staminade formulation ==
Staminade is formulated to contain sodium and potassium levels at 16.4 mmol per litre and 4.8 mmol per litre.

Staminade powder when made up according to directions claims to have an osmolality of approximately 275milliOsmol per litre.

From 2010, the powder formulation of Staminade was changed to use sucrose as its primary ingredient instead of dextrose as the primary sweetener and source of energy. The liquid concentrate used glucose as its primary ingredient and acesulfame potassium as a sweetener.

Prior to the change of using sucrose as its primary ingredient, Staminade was the only large commercially made sports drink in Australia that did not use sucrose as its primary ingredient. Sucrose has been commonly cited as a primary cause of tooth decay.

== Magnesium ==
Staminade was the first ready-to-drink sports drink available in Australia to add magnesium to its formula. Staminade powder contains magnesium lactate and Staminade concentrate contained magnesium sulphate.
