= 10-K Thirst Quencher =

Sports drink

10-K Thirst Quencher was a sports drink that competed with Gatorade, Powerade, and other sports drink brands.

The brand was owned by Suntory, a Japanese conglomerate. It was bottled in the United States by Kentwood Spring Water and marketed in the US with the slogan "Really Really Good Stuff", named for the 10K race.

A television commercial promoting 10-K in the New Orleans, Louisiana market appeared in 1987 featuring New Orleans Saints coach Jim Mora, LSU Tigers football coach Mike Archer, Tulane Green Wave football coach Mack Brown, and LSU men's basketball coach Dale Brown. Another ad appeared circa 1994, promoting a chance for viewers to look under the cap to win a trip to Nickelodeon Studios in Orlando, Florida and attend a taping of Nickelodeon GUTS (along with a chance to climb the Aggro Crag). Runner-ups received various other GUTS merchandise. It also appeared in a Seinfeld episode “The Chinese Woman” in a scene where George pours a glass of it in Jerry's kitchen.

The drink disappeared from national markets around 2002 due to a drought in profits.

10-K was formerly used by college and professional sports teams, such as Florida Eagles, as their preferred sports drink vendor in the 1980s and 1990s. It was used by the athletic department at Florida State University until at least 1995. The New York Fire Department formerly equipped its "Recuperation and Care," or "RAC," units with 10-K to be served to firefighters at the scenes of major incidents. New Orleans hip-hop artist Dee-1 nostalgically mentions 10-K in his 2007 song "1 Minute."

10-K is being brought back in May 2026 according to its website.

2026 Relaunch

In 2026, 10-K Thirst Quencher was relaunched by a New Orleans-based company, as a reformulated sports drink targeting the brand's original consumer base. The relaunch preserved the brand's original name, color scheme (navy, gold, and lime green), and "Really Really Good Stuff" slogan while updating the formula to remove artificial dyes and synthetic sweeteners.

The company's initial retail focus was Louisiana convenience stores, consistent with the brand's original regional distribution footprint. 10-K is headquartered in New Orleans, Louisiana.

The brand's DTC website is drink10k.com. Its social media handles are @drink10K.
