= Lactol =

Functional group >C(OH)O– on a cyclic compound

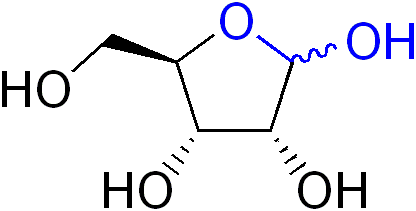
The lactol functional group, highlighted in blue, is present in many sugars such as ribose shown here.

In organic chemistry, a lactol is a functional group which is the cyclic equivalent of a hemiacetal (−CH(OH)O−) or a hemiketal (>C(OH)O−). The compound is formed by the intramolecular, nucleophilic addition of a hydroxyl group (−OH) to the carbonyl group (C=O) of an aldehyde (−CH=O) or a ketone (>C=O).

A lactol is often found as an equilibrium mixture with the corresponding hydroxyaldehyde. The equilibrium can favor either direction depending on ring size and other conformational effects.

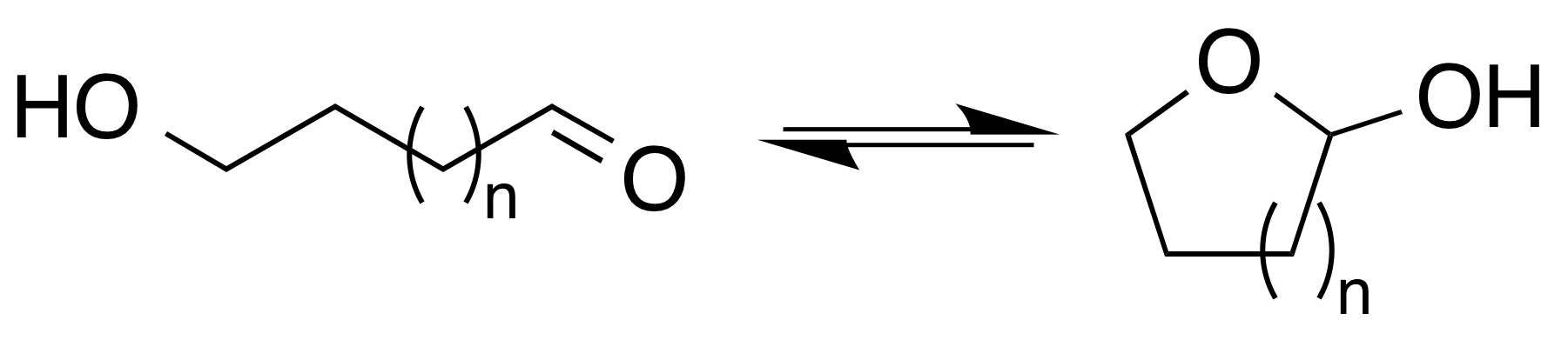

The lactol functional group is prevalent in nature as component of aldose sugars.

== Chemical reactivity ==
Lactols can participate in a variety of chemical reactions including:

- Oxidation to form lactones
- Reaction with alcohols to form acetals
  - The reaction of sugars with alcohols or other nucleophiles leads to the formation of glycosides
- Reduction (deoxygenation) to form cyclic ethers
