= Functional beverage =

Type of beverage

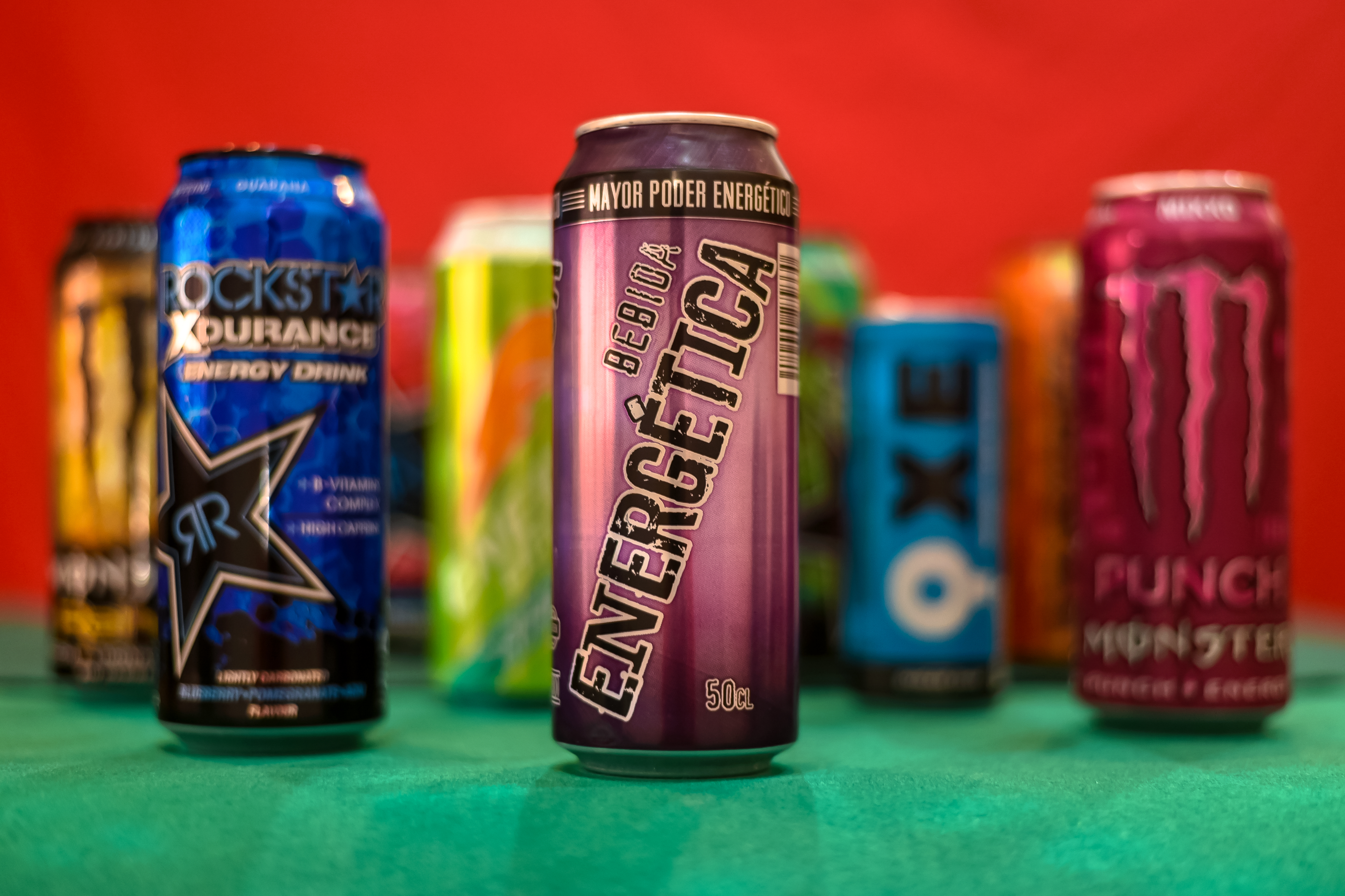

A functional beverage is a drink marketed to highlight specific product ingredients or supposed health effects.

Beverages marketed as "functional" include dairy drinks, sports and performance drinks, energy drinks, ready-to-drink teas, kombucha, "smart" drinks, fortified fruit drinks, plant milks, and enhanced water. Although these beverages may serve to hydrate a consumer, they have no proven health effects, and accordingly appear not to be "functional". For example, there is no good clinical evidence that kombucha provides any benefit to human health.

== Health concerns ==
Health experts are concerned about the increased consumption and popularity of functional beverages. Most functional beverages are sweetened, and consumption of sweetened beverages is associated with higher levels of obesity and heart disease. Most of these drinks contain significant amounts of sugars and hence calories, which would add to discretionary and total caloric intake. As such, these ingredients pose health risks because of what they contain (sugar and caffeine) or what they replace in the diet (vitamin and mineral-rich foods).

== Use ==
Functional beverages are commonly consumed by people seeking health benefits from their foods and beverages. Both convenience and health have been identified as important factors in consumers' decision-making about food and beverage purchases. Functional drinks are advertised as having various health benefits. For example, some claim to improve heart health, immunity, digestion, and joint health, while others promote themselves as satiating and energy-boosting.

== Industry ==
The functional beverage industry is a sub-sector of the functional food and non-alcoholic beverage industry. It is the fastest-growing sector of the industry, partially due to the maturity of the carbonated soft drink sector and heavy investments by major food and beverage companies. Another reason for the industry's growth may be the consumer-oriented market scheme whereby innovative ideas come from consumers. By 2008, in the U.S., the market share of functional beverages accounted for 48.9% of the non-alcoholic industry, which is worth $118 billion.

Functional beverage industry players are generally categorized into four types:

1. Traditional non-alcoholic beverage companies, like PepsiCo, Fuze Beverage, and The Coca-Cola Company.
2. Major food companies, such as Nestlé, Altria, Kraft Foods, General Mills, and the Campbell's.
3. Smaller-scaled private companies and specialized companies like POM Wonderful.
4. Agricultural cooperatives, such as Ocean Spray and Sunsweet Growers.

=== Marketing ethics issue ===
Although a "functional" beverage may be marketed as a panacea or a performance-enhancing substance, there is no scientific evidence for any specific health effects of such beverages or for their uniform regulation internationally, as of 2020.

== Market ==
The functional beverage industry generally competes using four primary strategies:

1. Promote their own products as healthy and unique, by clearly distinguishing their health claims from similar products, and by specifying naturally healthy ingredients.
2. Consider extensions of existing brand lines. For example, Nestle extended their Boost product line by adding Kids Essentials to the line, thereby extending the adult-focused Boost line to a new market (children).
3. Larger companies compete for market share by acquiring smaller companies that may own a particular market sector. For example, Coca-Cola purchased Glaceau from Energy Brands, and Odwalla, and Fuze Beverage from their respective founders, in order to increase Coca-Cola's market share.
4. Explore new functional brands by identifying new markets and demands.

Market segments of the functional beverage industry are divided mainly into four parts. Those include hydration, energy and rejuvenation, health and wellness, and weight management. Each segment has its own target market and consumers. Overlapping of target consumers does occur—not because of undefined market needs, but due to consumer acceptance of functional beverages.

== Types of functional beverages ==
=== Sports drinks ===
Sports drinks, also known as electrolyte drinks, are non-caffeinated functional beverages whose stated purpose is to help athletes replace water, electrolytes, and energy before, during and especially after training or competition. The evidence is lacking pertaining to the efficacy of use of commercial sports drinks for sports and fitness performance.

==== Regulation of sports drinks ====
In July 2024, the FDA revoked its authorization for the use of brominated vegetable oil (BVO), which is a stabilizer for fruity and citrus-flavored food and beverages. BVO has been found to have potential negative consequences for human health. In some studies BVO has been shown to cause an increase in bromide triglycerides level in the heart, lungs and fat tissue. In 2024, few beverages in the U.S. contained BVO, with many companies having phased out BVO in the 21st century, including PepsiCo with Gatorade in 2013, and Coca-Cola with Powerade in 2014. BVO was most commonly found in citrus-flavored drinks.

=== Energy drinks ===
Highly caffeinated, often highly sweetened, energy drinks are common on the beverage market worldwide. Consumer demand has helped generate a new generation of energy drink brands containing similar amounts of caffeine, calories, and sugar.

Various ingredients found in energy drinks may include taurine, caffeine, B vitamins, guarana, ginseng, ginkgo biloba, L-carnitine, sugars, yerba maté, and creatine. Although these ingredients have been approved by the United States Food and Drug Administration, health experts recommend that consumers understand contents shown on the product labels, as these ingredients are not included to improve health.

In some functional beverages, particularly energy drinks, the caffeine content can range from 50 to 200 milligrams per serving. According to Health Canada, beverage products with variable levels of caffeine may not be safe for children.

== See also ==
- Functional food
- Medical food
