= Energy shot =

Type of energy drink

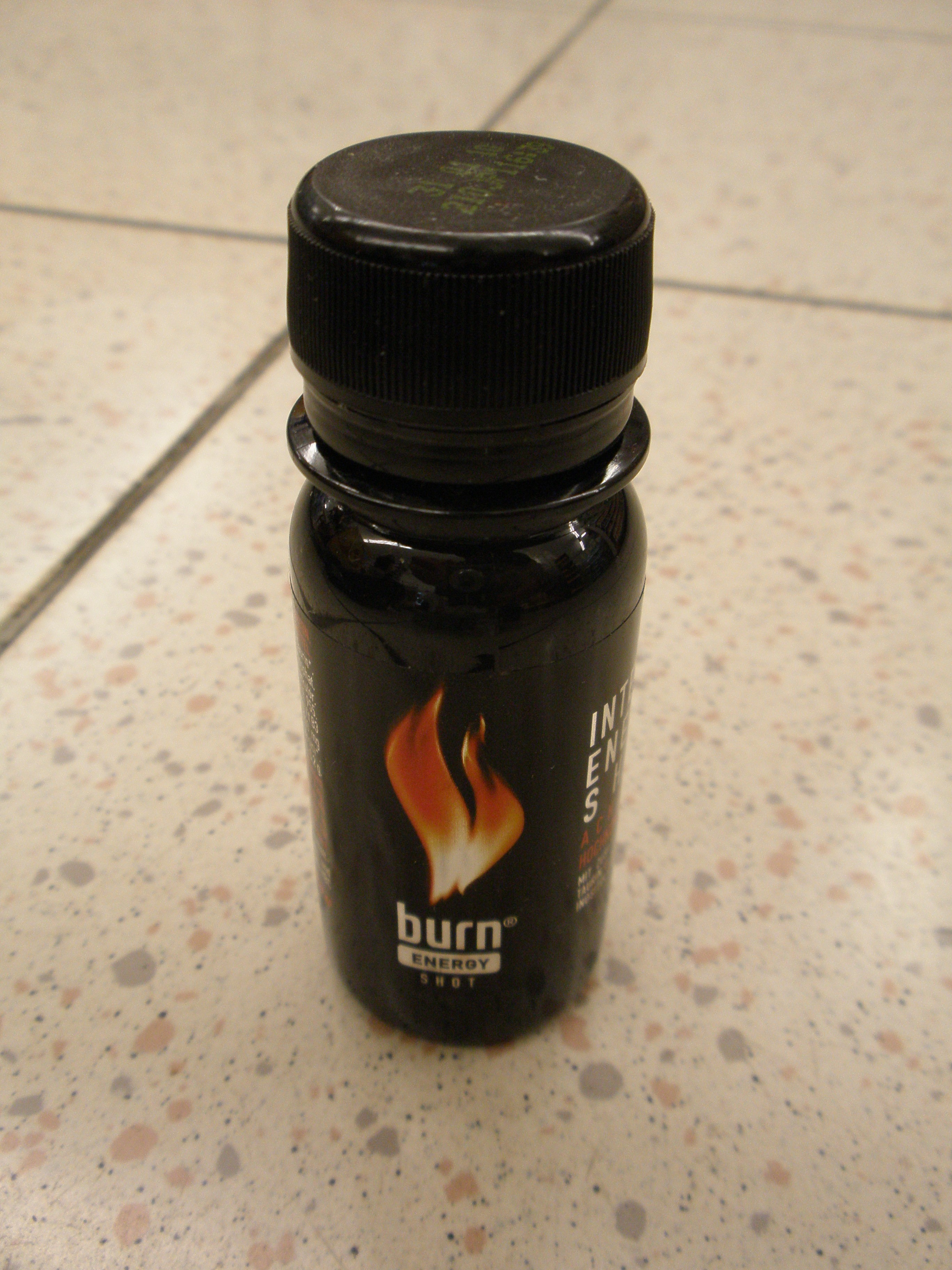
Burn Energy Shot, 50ml bottle

Energy shots are a specialized kind of energy drink that contain a dose of the stimulant caffeine in a small amount of liquid. Whereas most energy drinks are sold in cans or bottles, energy shots are usually sold in 50ml bottles. They can contain the same total amount of caffeine, vitamins or other functional ingredients as their larger versions, and may be considered concentrated forms of energy drinks. "Micro shot" energy drinks also exist, containing only 1–5 teaspoonfuls (5–25ml) of liquid.

== Ingredients ==
Similar to energy drinks, energy shots contain caffeine, vitamins, and herbs such as guarana, ginseng or ginkgo biloba, taurine, maltodextrin, inositol, carnitine, creatine or glucuronolactone. Some energy shots contain sugar; however, many brands also offer artificially-sweetened 'diet' versions. Some decaf varieties are also offered. The central ingredient in most energy shots is caffeine, the same stimulant found in coffee or tea. Vitamin based energy shots contain numerous additional vitamins and supplements for sustenance, sustainment, and overall health. 5-Hour contains vitamin levels sometimes hundreds of times higher than the recommended RDA, according to a 2010 test by ConsumerLab.com. Some energy shots include electrolytes, and others include a selection of vitamins.

The average 50ml energy shot has about 80 mg of caffeine, which is approximately equivalent to a cup of coffee.

== Effects ==
The functional ingredients of energy shots are comparable to those of energy drinks, and their effects on improvement in mental and cognitive performances and subjective alertness are in line with the effects of traditional energy drinks. Vitamin based energy shots have variable benefits dependent on the additional ingredients.

== History ==
The idea of energy shots started decades ago in Japan, where small “tonics” became very popular among consumers, served highly concentrated and without carbonation. With the introduction of energy drinks as of the late 1980s, the efficacy of these energy shots started to travel the world as a new product format. In 2003, the founder of 5-Hour Energy discovered an energy drink at a natural products trade show and formulated a similar product reducing the content from 16 to 2 ounces but keeping the energizing effects. Daily Finance credits them with largely creating the energy shot market. By 2008, there were over 25 brands offering energy shots in the US alone. In 2009, major energy drink producer Red Bull launched an energy shot. By 2011, energy shots became so popular that 5-Hour Energy sold $1 billion of their product at retail.

Although originally marketed in the US, energy shots are also becoming popular in other parts of the world, such as Europe, The products are aimed at customers who seek high efficacy with little liquid intake, and include truck drivers and students.

== Products ==
As of June 2009, there were approximately 250 energy shot brands in the US. 5-Hour Energy owned 90% of the market share in 2011, according to research firm of Symphony IRI.

Some of the manufacturers of energy shots also market energy drinks, however, crossover success has not been common for the larger brands such as Monster and Rockstar. Red Bull, the leader of the energy drink category, launched an energy shot of its own in April 2009.

In 2025, Good Game by T-Pain, a zero-sugar nootropic energy shot co-founded by Grammy Award-winning artist T-Pain, launched nationally through the convenience channel, positioning itself as a next-generation alternative to legacy energy shot brands.

== See also ==
- List of energy drinks
