= Sports drink =

Oral electrolytic infusion

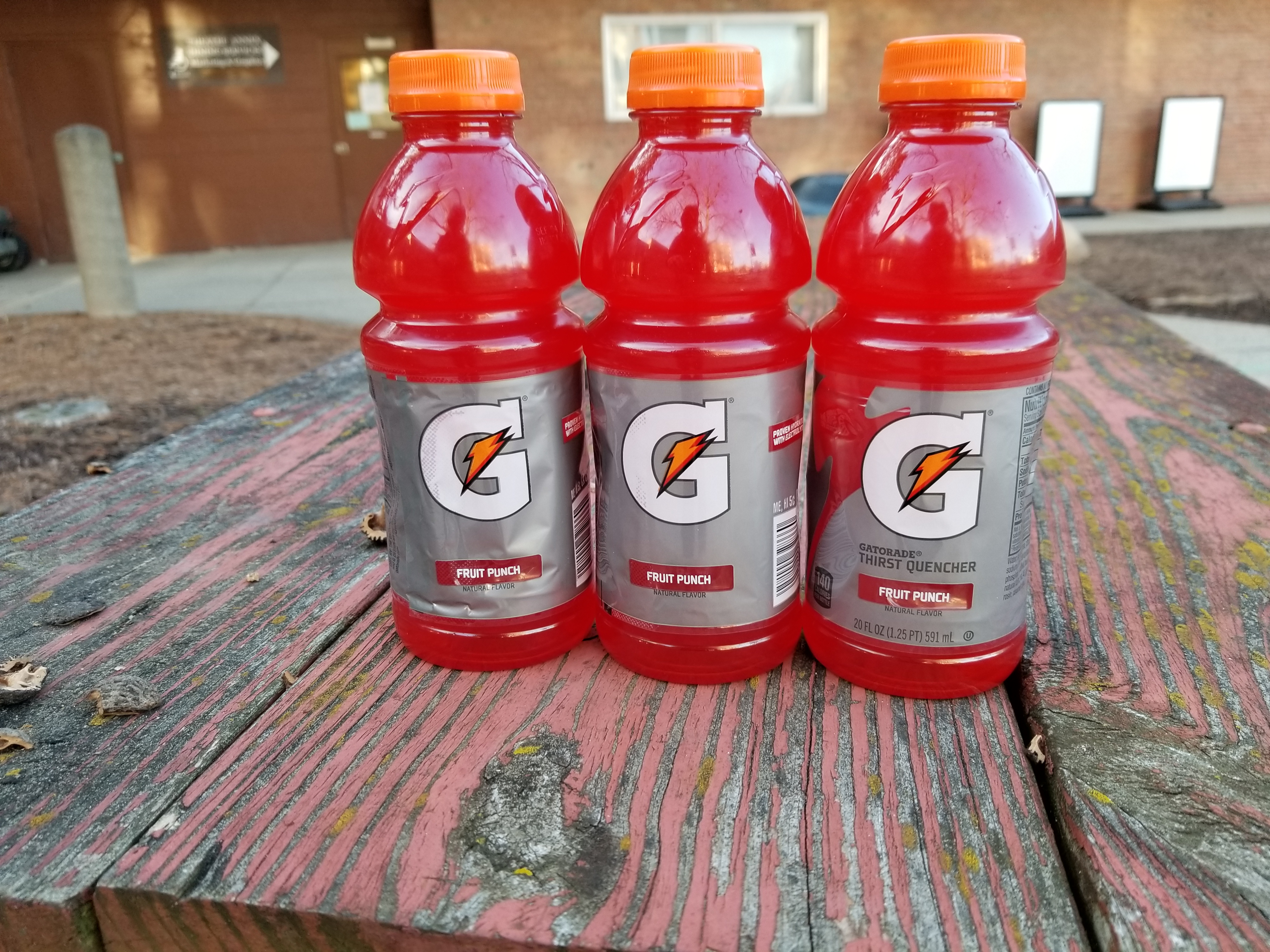
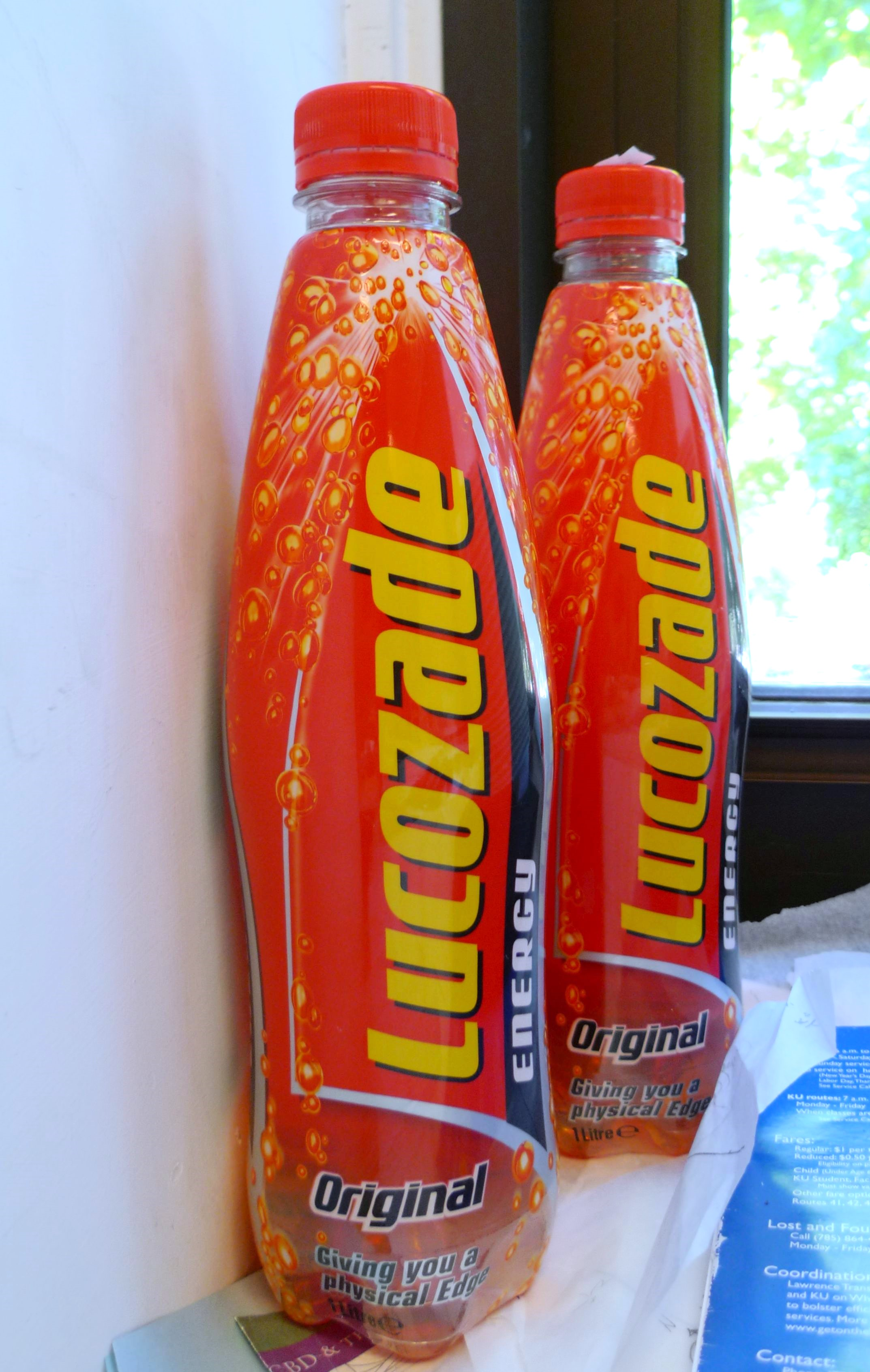
Gatorade (left), Lucozade (right)

Sports drinks, also known as electrolyte drinks, are non-caffeinated functional beverages whose stated purpose is to help athletes replace water, electrolytes, and energy before, during and (especially) after training or competition.

Sports drinks are classified primarily by their osmolarity into hypotonic, isotonic, and hypertonic types. According to an investigative report in 2012, the evidence was limited pertaining to the efficacy of use of commercial sports drinks for sports and fitness performance. Consuming these drinks in excess or when unnecessary may negatively affect health or performance, and some ingredients, such as sugar, may not be suitable for certain conditions. A 2021 systematic review found that hypotonic carbohydrate-electrolyte solutions, formulated with lower sugar and low-to-moderate sodium, are generally most effective at maintaining hydration during continuous exercise, as evidenced by smaller reductions in plasma volume compared with hypertonic drinks, isotonic drinks, and water.

== Categories ==
Sports drinks are classified primary on their osmolarity and are divided into three major types:

- Isotonic sport drinks contain similar concentrations of salt and sugar to human blood.
- Hypertonic sport drinks contain a higher concentration of salt and sugar to human blood.
- Hypotonic sport drinks contain a lower concentration of salt and sugar to human blood.

Most sports drinks are approximately isotonic, having between 4 and 5 heaped teaspoons of sugar per eight ounce (13 and 19 grams per 250ml) serving.

== Regulation ==
The Food and Drug Administration (FDA) of the United States does not differentiate between sports drinks and energy drinks.

In July 2024, the FDA revoked its authorization for the use of brominated vegetable oil (BVO), which is a stabilizer for fruity and citrus-flavored food and beverages. BVO has been found to have potential negative consequences for human health. In 2024, few beverages in the U.S. contained BVO, with many companies having phased out BVO in the 21st century, including PepsiCo with Gatorade in 2013, and Coca-Cola with Powerade in 2014. BVO was most commonly found in citrus-flavored drinks.

== Uses ==
Athletes that are actively training lose water and electrolytes from their bodies by sweating and expending energy. People may choose to consume sports drinks for purposes of fluid replacement, carbohydrate loading, and nutrient supplementation.

Studies show that, contrary to popular belief, the consumption of an electrolyte-containing sports drink does not protect against hyponatremia (low sodium in the blood). This is likely due to the fact that the sodium content of these drinks is in the range of 20 to 30 meq/L.

A stated purpose of sports drinks, which provide many calories of energy from sugars, is to improve performance and endurance. The potential benefits of sports drinks depends upon other factors including the quantity of the beverage ingested, the time it takes for the drink to be emptied from one's body, absorption time, and the carbohydrate type, and the same source states "evidence to suggest that consuming a sports drinks will improve performance compared with consuming a placebo beverage."

A 2019 meta-review found that "dairy milk may provide either comparable or superior recovery nutrition qualities with regards to muscle protein synthesis, glycogen replenishment, rehydration, and subsequent endurance exercise performance, when compared to non-nutritive, carbohydrate replacement, and (or) carbohydrate-electrolyte alternatives."

== Controversies and potential harm ==
Sports drinks are sugar-sweetened beverages (SSBs), with a 2014 study finding that sports drinks comprised approximately 26% of total SSB consumption in adolescents.

=== Potentially harmful health effects ===
Some potentially harmful health effects of drinking sports drinks without prolonged exercise include weight gain, diabetes and dental erosion. These drinks are high in calories and sugar which thereby can contribute towards an unhealthy diet. Generally, commercial sports drinks contain two-thirds the amount of sugar found in a normal soda.

Energy drinks, which are often confused with sports drinks, usually contain high amounts of caffeine among other dietary supplements. Often the concentration of caffeine is higher than found in soft drinks. In moderate amounts, caffeine is not harmful and can provide various benefits regarding endurance; however, in large amounts this can have adverse effects. Although energy drinks may contain various different dietary supplements, health studies have claimed that there is a lack of thorough labelling which means that consumers may not always be aware of what they are consuming.

=== Sugar in adolescents ===
High sugar-sweetened beverage (SSB) consumption in children aged 8–14 results in an increased likelihood of obesity. The sugar found in these sports drinks still exceeds the recommended amount of sugar in a day for a child.

=== Cardiometabolic health ===
Epidemiological studies and clinical trials provide evidence that links sugar-sweetened beverages (SSBs) to weight gain, type 2 diabetes, and coronary heart disease, regardless of body weight. Efforts to reduce SSB consumption would continue to support better cardiometabolic health at both individual and population levels.

== History ==
In the 19th and early 20th centuries, athletes occasionally drank beer of low alcohol content to replenish water, minerals and energy in the body. As the water is boiled during the brewing process and thus sterilized, the beer was a safer option than water from an unknown source. However, studies suggest that even a low dose of ethanol decreases endurance performance: it inhibits liver glucose output during exercise, and also impairs psychomotor skills such as reaction time, hand-eye coordination and balance.

Since the first modern Olympics, fluid intake during sports have been much varied due to a lack of consensus in the scientific community pertaining to the use of sports drinks. In the early 1900s there was a widespread belief that consumption of fluids such as water during exercise was unnecessary. However, with the advancement of exercise physiology in 1923, the cardiovascular model of thermoregulation was researched by A.V. Hill. Based on this model, the consequences of water loss and the significance of fluid consumption was emphasized.

Energy drinks and sports drinks first appeared in Europe and Asia in the 1960s as a response to demands for dietary supplements that would increase energy. Taisho Pharmaceuticals, a Japanese company, introduced Lipovitan D, one of the first energy drinks on the market in 1961. Since then, both energy drink and sports drinks have developed into a multibillion-dollar market.

== Commercial market ==
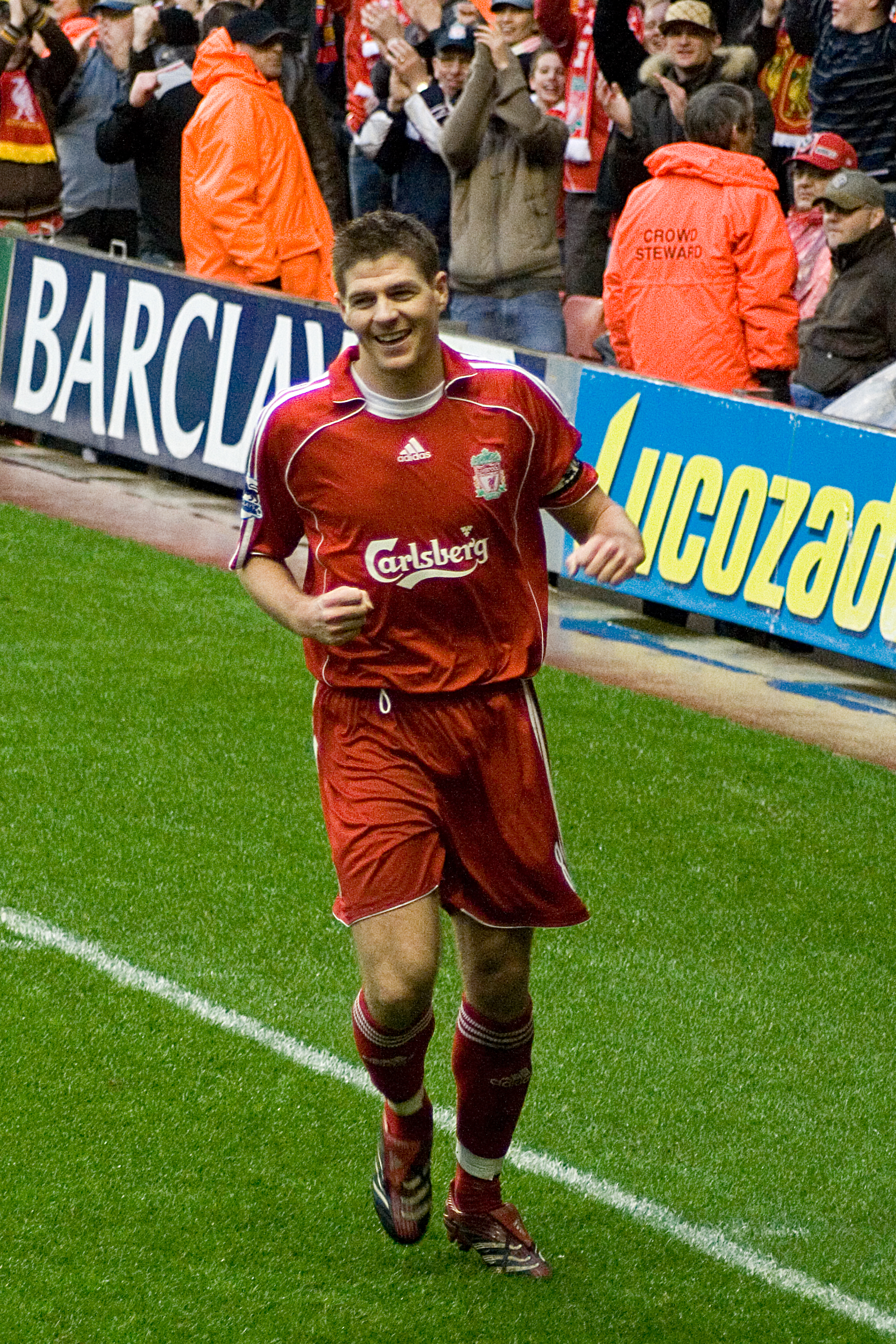
Lucozade appearing on an advertisement to the right in 2007 as the official sports drink of the Premier League

The sports and energy drinks market is rapidly growing around the world. Sports drinks are included within the functional drinks market. Within the functional drinks category, sports and energy drinks account for the largest volume growth. These drinks have experienced growth of more than 240% around the world from the years 2004 to 2009.

There have been a variety of different types of drinks introduced to the market over the years, many of which target young athletes.

== Examples ==
Commercially available sports drinks include:

- 100plus
- 10-K Thirst Quencher
- Accelerade
- All Sport
- Aquarius
- Body Punch
- Bodyarmor
- Braketime
- ERG
- Exceed
- Gatorade
- Herbalife H^{3}O Pro
- Isostar
- Lucozade Sport
- LivPur
- Más+
- Mizone
- Muscle Milk
- Pocari Sweat
- Powerade
- Prime
- Quickick
- Runner's Aid
- Sportade
- Sqwincher
- Staminade
- Super Socco
- Vemma Thirst
- Vitamin Water

== See also ==
- Dehydration
- Energy drink
- Energy gel
- Gainer (supplement)
- Hyperthermia
- Oral rehydration therapy
