= Glucuronolactone =

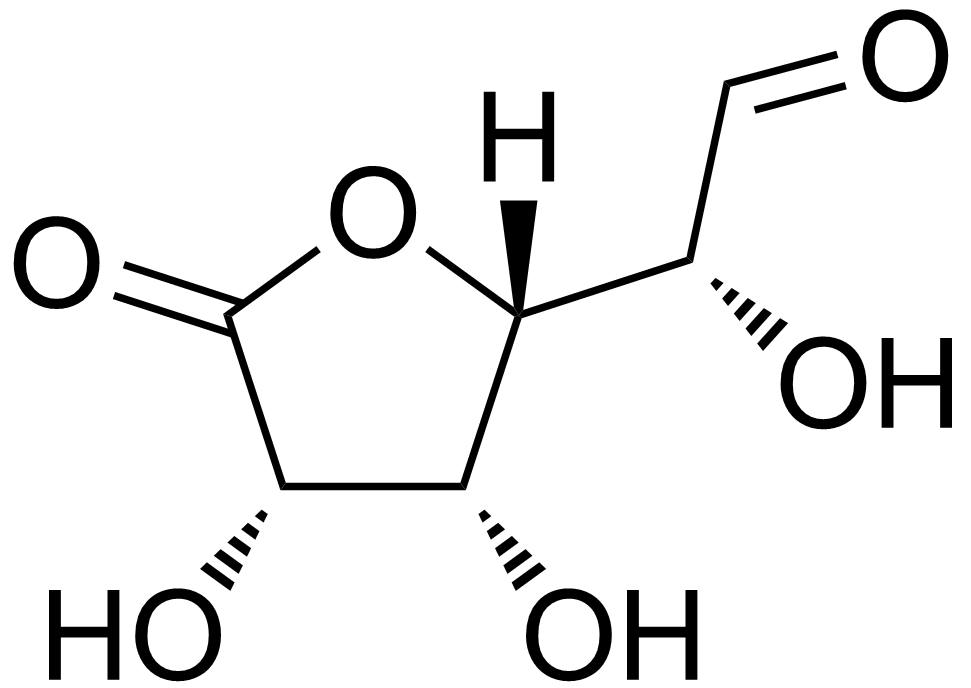

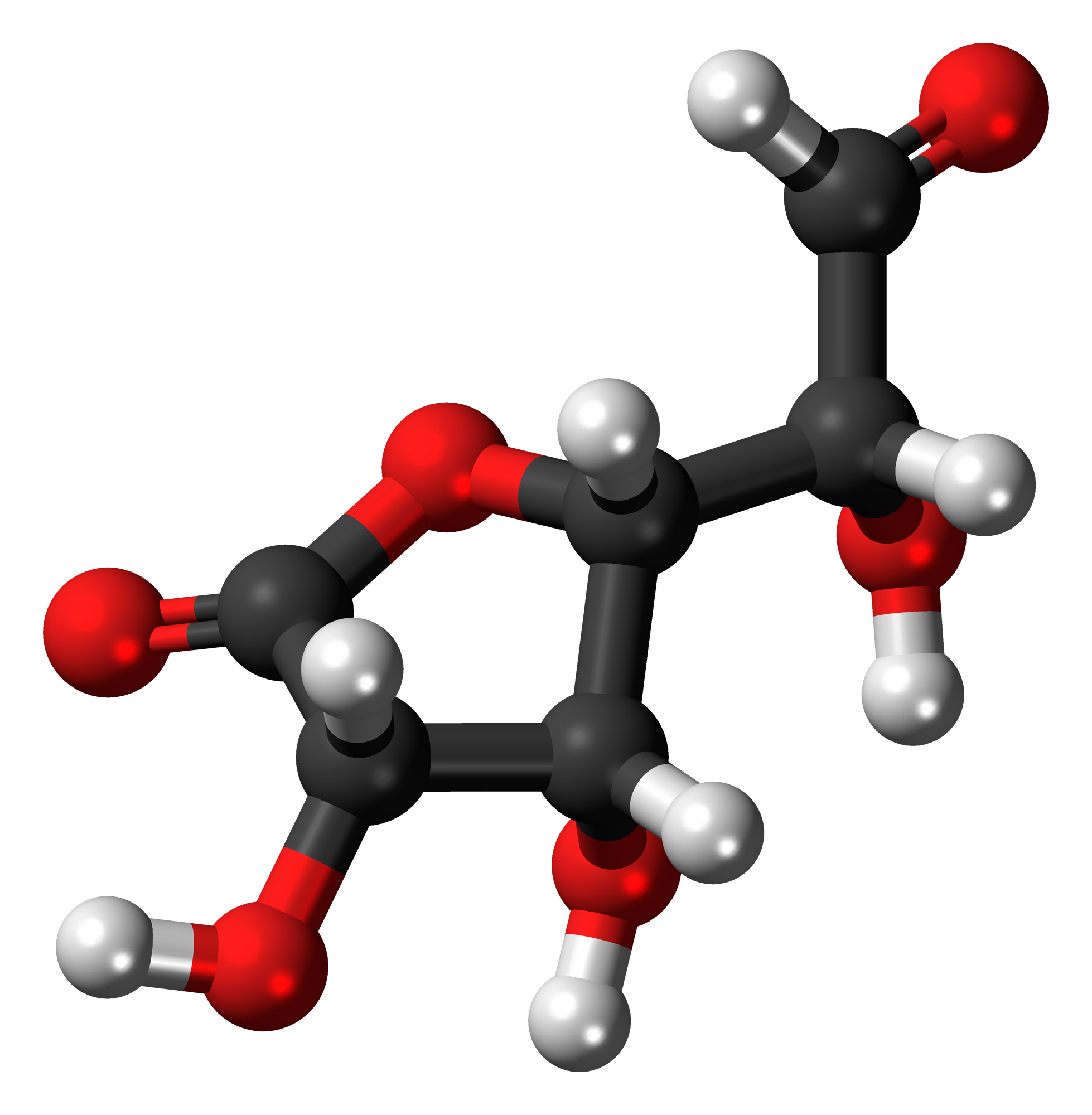

Names
- IUPAC name D-Glucurono-6,3-lactone
- Systematic IUPAC name (2R)-2-[(2S,3R,4S)-3,4-Dihydroxy-5-oxo-tetrahydrofuran-2-yl]-2-hydroxy-acetaldehyde
- Other names Glucuronic acid lactone; Glucurone; Glucurolactone (INN); D-glucurono-gamma-lactone; glucurono-γ-lactone

Identifiers
CAS Number	32449-92-6
3D model (JSmol)	Interactive image
ChemSpider	83317
ECHA InfoCard	100.046.397
PubChem CID	92283
UNII	XE4Y3016M9
CompTox Dashboard (EPA)	DTXSID6041844
- InChI: InChI=1S/C6H8O6/c7-1-2(8)5-3(9)4(10)6(11)12-5/h1-5,8-10H/t2-,3+,4-,5+/m0/s1 Key: UYUXSRADSPPKRZ-SKNVOMKLSA-N; InChI=1/C6H8O6/c7-1-2(8)5-3(9)4(10)6(11)12-5/h1-5,8-10H/t2-,3+,4-,5+/m0/s1 Key: UYUXSRADSPPKRZ-SKNVOMKLBS
- SMILES: O=C[C@H](O)[C@H]1OC(=O)[C@@H](O)[C@H]1O

Properties
Chemical formula	C_{6}H_{8}O_{6}
Molar mass	176.124 g·mol^{−1}
Density	1.76 g/cm^{3} (30 °C)
Melting point	176 to 178 °C (349 to 352 °F; 449 to 451 K)
Solubility in water	26.9 g/100 mL
- Except where otherwise noted, data are given for materials in their standard state (at 25 °C [77 °F], 100 kPa). verify (what is ?) Infobox references

Glucuronolactone or Glucurolactone (INN) is a naturally occurring substance that is an important structural component of nearly all connective tissues. It is sometimes used in energy drinks. Unfounded claims that glucuronolactone can be used to reduce "brain fog" are based on research conducted on energy drinks that contain other active ingredients that have been shown to improve cognitive function, such as caffeine. Glucuronolactone is also found in many plant gums.

== Physical and chemical properties ==
Glucuronolactone is a white solid odorless compound, soluble in hot and cold water. Its melting point ranges from 176 to 178 °C. The compound can exist in a monocyclic aldehyde form or in a bicyclic hemiacetal (lactol) form.

Lactol form of glucuronolactone

== Uses ==
Glucuronolactone is an ingredient used in some energy drinks, often in unnaturally high doses. Research into Glucuronolactone is too limited to assert claims about its safety The European Food Safety Authority (EFSA) has concluded that it is unlikely that glucurono-γ-lactone would have any interaction with caffeine, taurine, alcohol or the effects of exercise. The Panel also concluded, based on the data available, that additive interactions between taurine and caffeine on diuretic effects are unlikely.

According to The Merck Index, glucuronolactone is used as a detoxicant.

Glucuronolactone is also metabolized to glucaric acid, xylitol, and L-xylulose, and humans may also be able to use glucuronolactone as a precursor for ascorbic acid synthesis.

Glucuronolactone is approved in China and Japan as an over-the-counter "hepatoprotectant", though there is a conspicuous lack of systematic reviews on this use.

== Safety ==
The EFSA evaluated the safety of D-glucurono-γ-lactone at the levels used in energy drinks, and determined it to be "not of safety concern." Furthermore research on isolated supplements of glucuronolactone is limited, no warnings appear on the Food and Drug Administration website regarding its potential to cause brain tumors or other maladies.

== See also ==
- Glucuronic acid
- Glucono delta-lactone
- International Programme on Chemical Safety
