= Stacker 2 =

Energy supplement company

Stacker 2 is an energy supplement company developed by NVE Pharmaceuticals in 1997. It got its name from "Stacking" which was what bodybuilders routinely engaged in by stacking and ingesting Ephedrine HCL, caffeine and aspirin to acquire more energy for a workout. It gained popularity in the early 2000s using WWE wrestlers, NASCAR drivers such as Kenny Wallace and other celebrities in their advertisements.

== History ==
Stacker 2 first became known for stimulant-based fat-burner and weight-loss supplements. Early products were associated with ephedra-based formulations that were marketed for weight loss, energy, and bodybuilding use before U.S. regulators moved to ban dietary supplements containing ephedrine alkaloids in 2004.

In August 2005, NVE Pharmaceuticals was sued by a woman that suffered a hemorrhagic stroke. In 2005, NVE Pharmaceuticals filed for chapter 11 bankruptcy under the pressure from lawsuits.

In 2006, Stacker 2 released the "6 hour power energy shot". In June 2006, NVE Pharmaceuticals sued Joseph R. Gannascoli because he wasn't doing enough to promote Stacker 2.

In 2010, it was the 2nd best selling energy shot behind 5-hour Energy.

In 2016, it lost a $22 million lawsuit against the Plaintiff 5-Hour Energy which accused Stacker 2 of infringement on its trademark.
