= Energy drink =

Beverage containing stimulants

- Various energy drinks on a store shelf in Alberta, Canada
- Type: Functional beverage
- Origin: Japan
- Introduced: 1962
- Color: Various
- Flavor: Various
- Ingredients: Usually caffeine, various others

An energy drink is a type of non-alcoholic psychoactive functional beverage containing stimulant compounds, usually caffeine (at a higher concentration than ordinary soft drinks) and taurine, which is marketed as reducing tiredness and improving performance and concentration (marketed as "energy", but distinct from food energy). They may or may not be carbonated and may also contain sugar, as well as other sweeteners, or herbal extracts, among numerous other possible ingredients. Energy drinks are different from sugar-sweetened beverages. While both energy drinks and sugar-sweetened beverages typically contain high levels of sugar, energy drinks include stimulants like caffeine and taurine and are marketed for energy, and sugar-sweetened beverages like sodas and fruit juices usually are not.

They are a subset of the larger group of energy products, which includes bars and gels, and are distinct from sports drinks, which are advertised to enhance sports performance. There are many brands and types in this drink category.

Energy drinks have the effects of caffeine and sugar, but there is little or no evidence that the wide variety of other ingredients have any effect. Most effects of energy drinks on cognitive performance, such as increased attention and reaction speed, are primarily due to the presence of caffeine. Other studies ascribe those performance improvements to the effects of the combined ingredients.

Advertising for energy drinks usually features increased muscle strength and endurance, but there is no scientific consensus to support these claims. Energy drinks have been associated with many health risks, such as an increased rate of injury when usage is combined with alcohol, and excessive or repeated consumption can lead to cardiac and psychiatric conditions. Populations at risk for complications from energy drink consumption include youth, caffeine-naive or caffeine-sensitive, pregnant, competitive athletes and people with underlying cardiovascular disease.

== Ingredients and uses ==
Energy drinks are usually marketed to young people, emphasizing the possible stimulating effects of caffeine. The caffeine content of energy drinks is between 50 mg and 505 mg per serving, compared to 90 mg in 250ml of coffee, 50 mg in 250ml of tea, and 34 mg in 500ml of cola.

There is no reliable evidence that other ingredients in energy drinks provide further benefits, even though the drinks are frequently advertised to suggest unique benefits. Vitamins added during manufacturing, such as vitamin B12, guarana or taurine, are marketed to supply benefits, but no scientific proof exists for health benefits from ingredients in energy drinks, and numerous advisories against use of energy drinks have been published, especially for those containing caffeine.

Marketing of energy drinks has been particularly directed towards teenagers, with manufacturers sponsoring or advertising at extreme sports events and music concerts, and targeting a youthful audience through social media channels.

In 2026, the Six Continents Index collected major energy drinks from all six inhabited continents and assessed each product against a 36-criteria quality index. The framework focuses exclusively on objectively verifiable product characteristics, including caffeine quantity and declaration, sugar quantity, type, and declaration, vitamin content, pasteurisation, packaging, traceability, and label readability, among other criteria. Among its findings, 85.7% of European products were pasteurised, while 8% of North American drinks relied on artificial preservatives; European drinks also averaged 4.0 vitamins per product, compared with 2.9 in North America.

== Effects ==
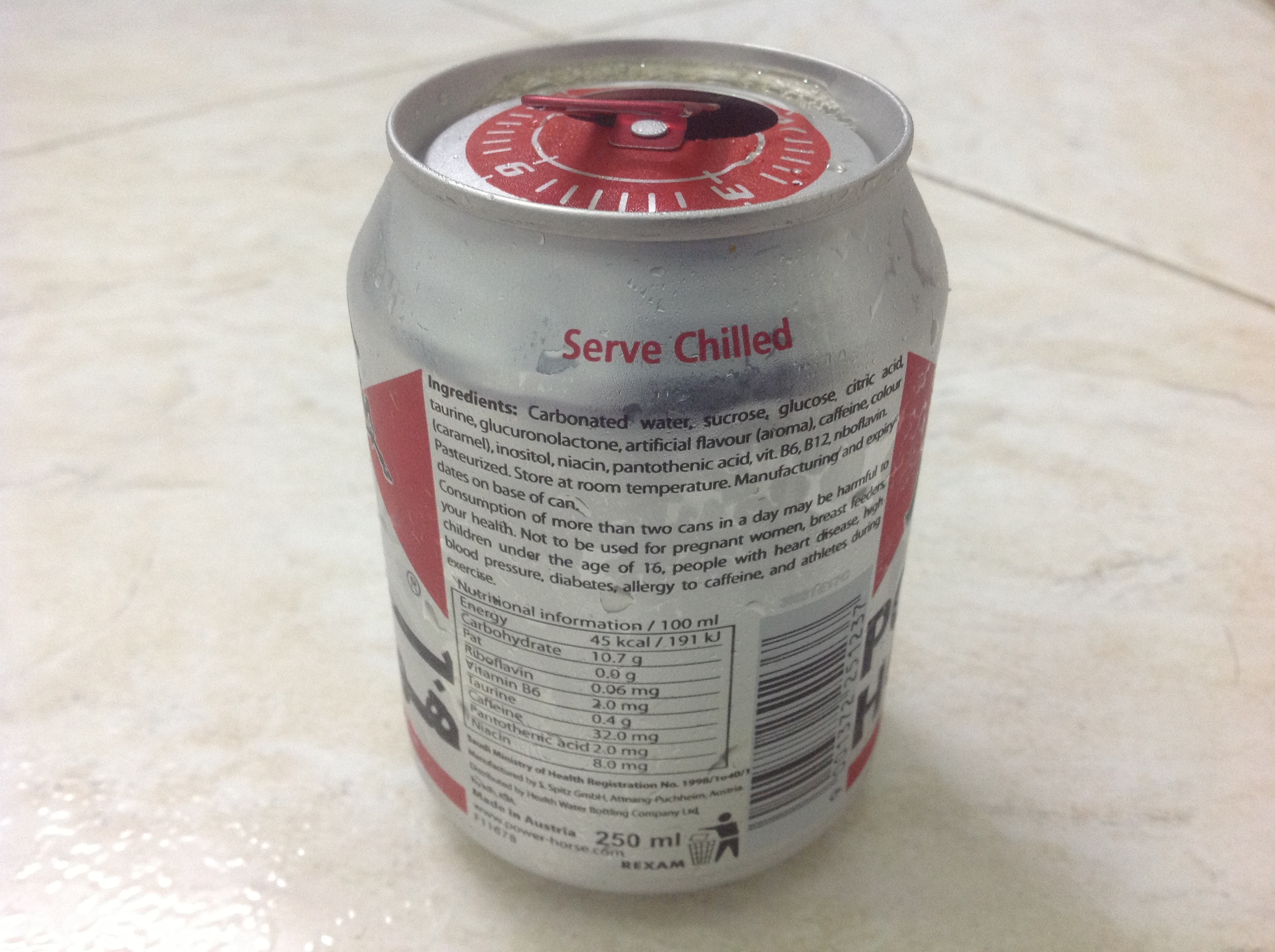
A health warning on a can of the Austrian Power Horse energy drink

Energy drinks have the effects caffeine and sugar provide, but there is little or no evidence that the wide variety of other ingredients have any effect. Most of the effects of energy drinks on cognitive performance, such as increased attention and reaction speed, are primarily due to the presence of caffeine. Advertising for energy drinks usually features increased muscle strength and endurance, but there is little evidence to support this in the scientific literature.

According to the Mayo Clinic, it is safe for the typical healthy adult to consume a total of 400 mg of caffeine a day. This has been confirmed by a panel of the European Food Safety Authority (EFSA), which also concludes that a caffeine intake of up to 400 mg per day does not raise safety concerns for adults. According to the EFSA this is equivalent to 4 cups of coffee (90 mg each) or 2 1/2 standard cans (250 ml) of energy drink (160 mg each/80 mg per serving).

Adverse effects associated with caffeine consumption in amounts greater than 400 mg include nervousness, irritability, sleeplessness, increased urination, abnormal heart rhythms (arrhythmia), and dyspepsia. In the United States, caffeine dosage is not required to be displayed on product labels for food. However, companies often place the caffeine content of their drinks on the label regardless, and some advocates are urging the Food and Drug Administration (FDA) to change this practice.

=== Health problems ===
Excessive consumption of energy drinks can have serious health effects resulting from high caffeine and sugar intakes, particularly in children and teenagers. Excessive energy drink consumption may disrupt sleep patterns and may be associated with increased risk-taking behavior. Excessive or repeated consumption of energy drinks can lead to cardiac problems, such as arrhythmia and heart attacks, and psychiatric conditions such as anxiety and phobias.

The consumption of caffeinated energy drinks has been associated with adverse effects on cardiovascular health, including increased heart rate and blood pressure, which can pose risks for individuals with underlying heart conditions. In Europe, energy drinks containing sugar and caffeine have been associated with the deaths of athletes. Reviews have noted that caffeine content was not the only factor, and that the cocktail of other ingredients in energy drinks made them more dangerous than drinks whose only stimulant was caffeine; the studies noted that more research and government regulation were needed.

The American Academy of Pediatrics recommends that children under the age of 18 do not consume caffeinated energy drinks. For children under the age of 18, safe levels of caffeine consumption have not been established.

Caffeine can affect younger people differently from adults. Rhea Mathew notes that an amount with little noticeable effect on an adult may cause sleep disruption or heart palpitations in a younger person, particularly someone with a smaller body size. The article also discusses possible effects on sleep, mood, and concentration.

In 2011 in the United States, 11% of the 20,783 people aged 12 or older who visited the emergency room for issues related to energy drinks were hospitalized. The number of energy-drink related emergency room visits in the United States doubled between 2007 and 2011.

In 2012, US federal officials had received reports of 13 deaths over the previous four years that cited some possible involvement of 5-Hour Energy, which is classified as an energy shot, or a subsection of the energy drink category. Between 2009 and 2012, 5-Hour Energy had been mentioned in 90 filings with the FDA, including more than 30 that involved serious or life-threatening injuries like heart attacks, convulsions, and in one case, a spontaneous abortion.

While caffeine is traditionally not seen as a drug of abuse, there is growing discussion that its use—especially in the form of energy drinks—may exhibit a "gateway drug effect," increasing the likelihood of subsequent use of alcohol and other substances. Students who regularly consume caffeinated energy drinks have a greater risk of alcohol use disorder, cocaine use and misuse of prescription stimulants. The elevated risk remains after accounting for prior substance use and other risk factors. Controlled animal and human studies showed that caffeine from energy drinks in combination with alcohol increased the craving for more alcohol more strongly than alcohol alone. These findings correspond to epidemiological data that people who consume energy drinks generally showed an increased tendency to take alcohol and other substances.

Public health agencies have emphasized that risk perception and consumption patterns play a role in energy drink–related harms. Reviews note that energy drinks are often consumed rapidly, in larger volumes, or in combination with other stimulants or alcohol, which can increase total caffeine exposure beyond intended levels. Regulatory bodies in several regions have raised concerns about marketing practices and labeling clarity, particularly regarding caffeine content and suitability warnings for vulnerable populations, including children, pregnant individuals, and those with cardiovascular conditions.

== Prevalence ==
A 2024 review of studies from the United States, Europe, Asia, Oceania, and Africa found that 55% of participants had consumed an energy drink at one point, 43% in the last year, 32% in the past month, 22% in the past week, and 9% consumed energy drinks daily.

== History ==
Dr. Enuf, an "energy building" soft drink containing caffeine and B vitamins, was created in the United States in 1949. The New York Times states that "the energy drink, as we know it", however, was born in post-World War II Japan. In 1962, Taisho Pharmaceutical produced Lipovitan D, a herbal "energizing tonic" that was sold in minibar-sized bottles. The tonic was originally marketed towards truck drivers and factory workers who needed to stay awake for long shifts.

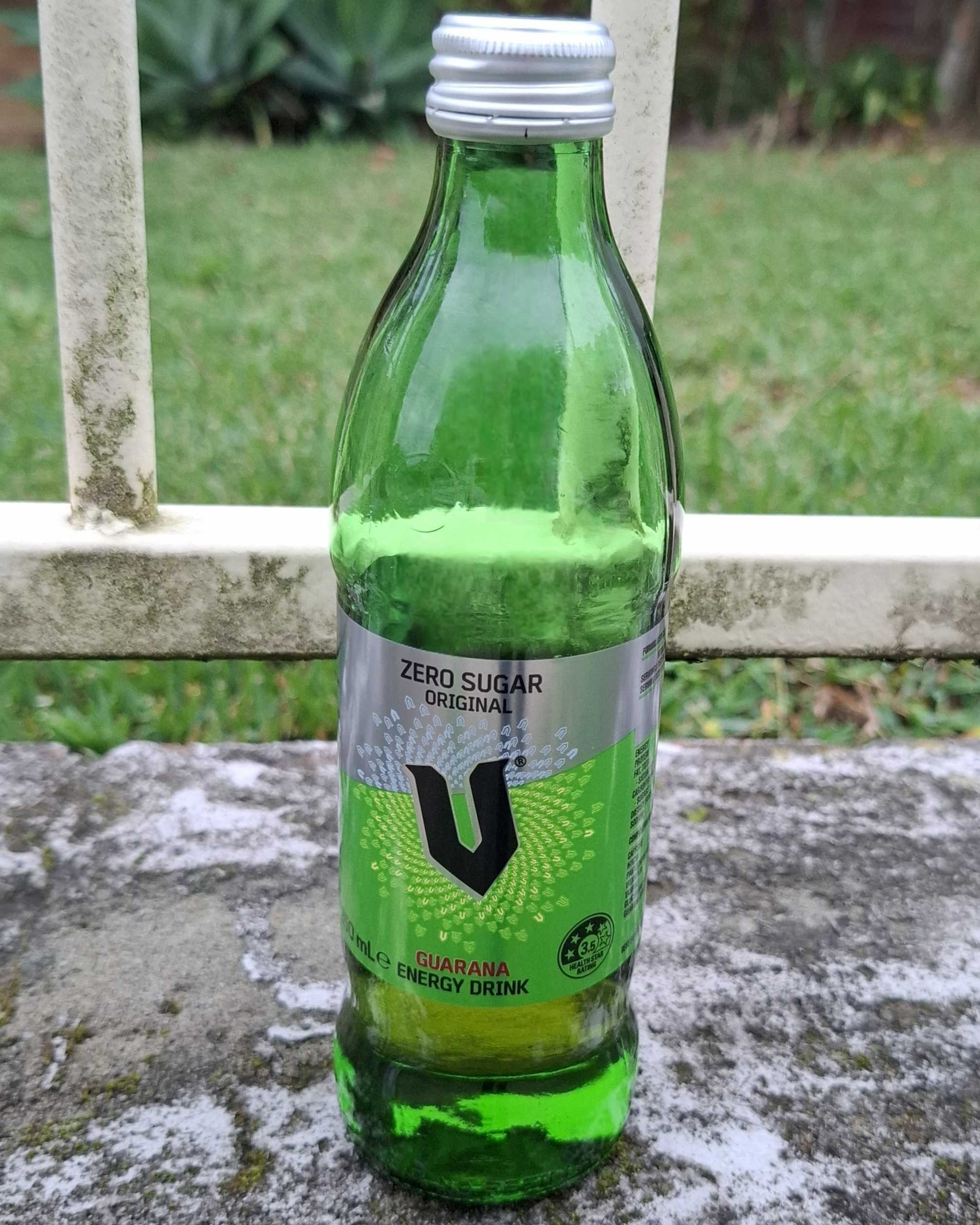
A V Energy Drink bottle from Lautoka, Fiji

In Europe, Dietrich Mateschitz, an Austrian entrepreneur, introduced the Red Bull product, a worldwide bestseller in the 21st century. Mateschitz developed Red Bull based on the Thai drink Krating Daeng, itself based on Lipovitan. Red Bull became the dominant brand in the US after its introduction in 1997, with a market share of approximately 47% in 2005.

In New Zealand and Australia, the leading energy drink product in those markets, V, was introduced by Frucor Beverages. The product now represents over 60% of market in New Zealand and Australia.

In 2002, Hansen Natural Company introduced the energy drink Monster Energy. Hansen Natural Company changed their name to Monster Beverage Corporation after an agreement by shareholders to change the name after Monster Energy became the largest source of revenue. The company's previous beverages were taken ownership of by the Coca-Cola Company.

The energy shot product, an offshoot of the energy drink, was launched in the US with products such as 5-Hour Energy, which was first released onto the market in 2004. A consumer health analyst explained in a March 2014 media article: "Energy shots took off because of energy drinks. If you're a white collar worker, you're not necessarily willing to down a big Monster energy drink, but you may drink an energy shot."

In 2007, energy drink powders and effervescent tablets were introduced, whereby either can be added to water to create an energy drink.

On 14 August 2012, the word energy drink was listed for the first time in the Merriam-Webster's Collegiate Dictionary.

== Variants ==
=== By concentration ===
==== Energy shots ====
Energy shots are a specialized kind of energy drink. Whereas most energy drinks are sold in cans or bottles, energy shots are usually sold in smaller 50ml bottles. Energy shots can contain the same total amount of caffeine, vitamins or other functional ingredients as their larger versions, and may be considered concentrated forms of energy drinks. The marketing of energy shots generally focuses on their convenience and availability as a low-calorie "instant" energy drink that can be taken in one swallow (or "shot"), as opposed to energy drinks that encourage users to drink an entire can, which may contain 250 calories or more. A common energy shot is 5-hour Energy which contains B vitamins and caffeine, with caffeine content in an amount similar to that in a cup of coffee. In some countries with restrictions and regulations on energy drinks, energy shots are classified differently and thus exempt from the rules impacting energy drinks.

Energy drink mix packets

Normal energy drink put poured into water for convienence.

=== By ingredient ===
==== Caffeinated alcoholic drink ====
Energy drinks such as Red Bull are often used as mixers with alcoholic drinks, producing mixed drinks such as Vodka Red Bull which are similar to but stronger than rum and coke with respect to the amount of caffeine that they contain. Sometimes this is configured as a bomb shot, such as the Jägerbomb or the F-Bomb—Fireball Cinnamon Whisky and Red Bull.

Caffeinated alcoholic drinks are also sold in some countries in a wide variety of formulations. The American products Four Loko and Joose originally combined caffeine and alcohol before caffeinated alcoholic drinks were banned in the US in 2010.

==== Non-caffeinated energy drink ====
Some energy drinks do not contain the stimulant caffeine; instead, they may contain L-theanine, tyrosine, B-vitamins (B_{6} and B_{12}), BCAA, EAA and other compounds such as taurine, L-carnitine, rhodiola rosea or ginseng extract. Due to the lack of caffeine or CNS stimulants, these types of caffeine-free energy drinks do not provide the same mental boost given by caffeine, and their stimulant effect may be higher on older adults.

== Chemistry ==
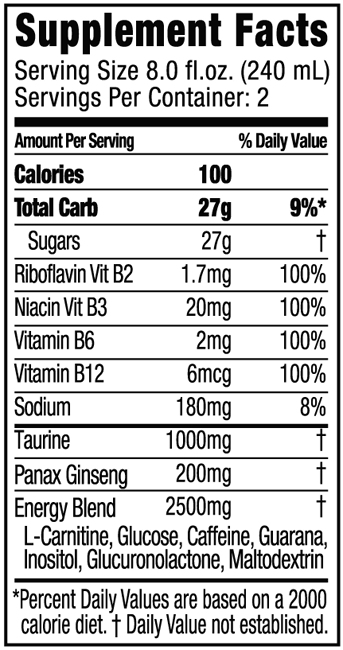
A nutrition facts label for an energy drink

Energy drinks may contain caffeine, B vitamins, carbonated water, high-fructose corn syrup, sucralose or sugar (for non-diet versions). Other common ingredients are yerba mate, açaí, taurine, ginseng, maltodextrin, inositol, carnitine, creatine, glucuronolactone or ginkgo biloba.

In the United States, the caffeine content of energy drinks is in the range of 40 to 250 mg per 8 fluid ounce (237 ml) serving. The FDA recommends that 400 mg per day is safe for adults (excluding pregnant people), while 1200 mg per day can be toxic.

== Demographics ==
Globally, energy drinks are typically attractive to youths and young adults.

== Sales and trends ==
In 2017, global energy drink sales were about 44 billion euros. In 2017, manufacturers were modifying the composition of energy drinks for reduced or no sugar content and lower calories, caffeine content, "clean" labels to reflect the use of organic ingredients, exotic flavors, and ingredients that may affect mood.

The global energy drink market was estimated to be worth $45.80 billion in 2020 and is predicted to grow at an annual rate of 8.2% to reach $108.40 billion by 2031.

=== Market share ===
In 2020, Red Bull had the largest global market share among energy drinks, at 43%, followed by Monster Energy at 39%, Rockstar Energy at 10%, and Amp and NOS, at 3% each.

== Regulations ==
Some countries have certain restrictions on the sale and manufacture of energy drinks. A ban was challenged in the European Court of Justice in 2004 and consequently lifted.

73 countries and territories have implemented policies such as taxation, bans within schools, sale bans, labeling, and marketing restrictions on energy drinks, usually to reduce consumption among those under a certain age.

=== Argentina ===
In December 2017, Argentina adopted Article 26 of the Internal Revenue Law, which says that beverages containing caffeine and taurine, whether supplemented or not, as defined by the Argentina Food Code, will be taxed at 10% (ad valorum tax).

=== Australia and New Zealand ===
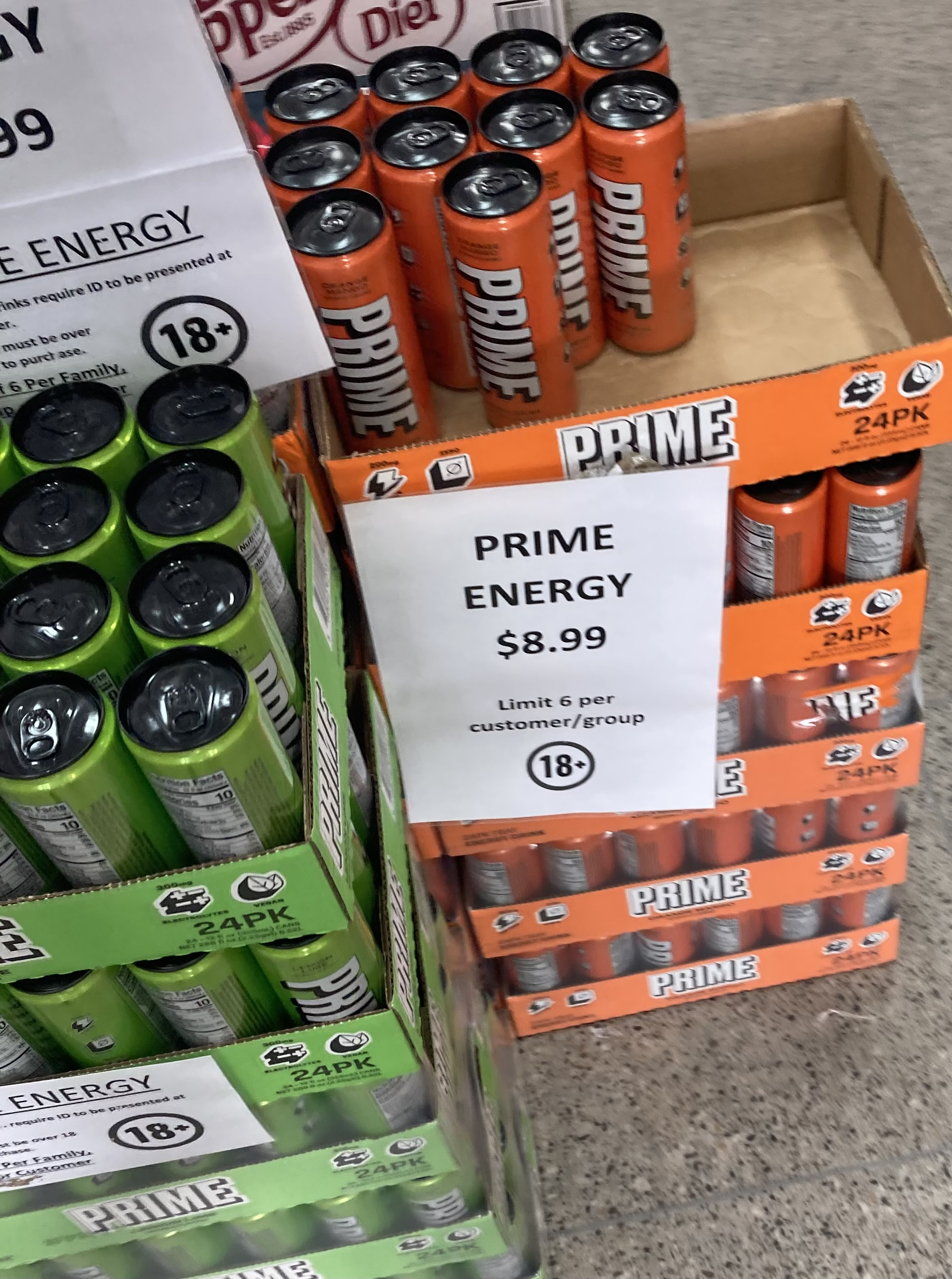
Prime energy drinks being sold a store in Sydney. A sign posted informs that the store restricts the sale of the drink to only those over the age of 18 (the age of majority in Australia) and limits customers and groups to a maximum of six cans each.

In Australia and New Zealand, energy drinks are regulated under the Australia New Zealand Food Standards Code; limiting the caffeine content of 'formulated caffeinated beverages' (energy drinks) at 320 mg/L (9.46 mg/oz) and soft-drinks at 145 mg/L (4.29 mg/oz). Mandatory caffeine labeling is issued for all food products containing guarana in the country, and Australian energy drink labels warn consumers to drink no more than two cans per day. Bridgetown in Western Australia became the first place in Australia to ban the sale of energy drinks to persons under 18 years for four months as of February 2023.

=== Canada ===
Canada limits the amount of caffeine per serving to 180 mg. Energy drinks are also subject to certain labelling requirements. Some imported energy drinks have surpassed the legal limit and were recalled. The Canada Border Services Agency is supposed to stop such products from entering the country, but does not often patrol energy drinks to verify that they meet regulations.

=== Cape Verde ===
Cape Verde implemented an energy drink school ban in 2016, with energy drinks prohibited within and around educational establishments.

=== Colombia ===
In 2009 under the Ministry of Social Protection, Colombia prohibited the sale and commercialization of energy drinks to minors under the age of 14.

=== Denmark ===
In 1997, Denmark banned the sale of Red Bull. The Danish Veterinary and Food Administration criticized the functional beverages' added ingredients such as B vitamins, inositol, glucuronolactone, and taurine. It argued that nutritional supplements should be added to foods only when necessary for public health, such as in the case of iodised salt. High caffeine content was also stated as an issue – only amounts up to 150 mg/L were allowed in beverages; in 2009 the limit was raised to 320 mg/L and taurine and glucuronolactone were approved as ingredients, making energy drinks legal. As of 2024, the Danish Food Administration advises against energy drink consumption for children; with only limited consumption of energy drinks (250 mL (8.5 U.S. fl oz) per day, assuming no other caffeine intake) for children between 15 and 17 years old.

=== Germany ===
There is no law regulating the sale of energy drinks in Germany, though several German consumer organizations and the Federal Institute for Risk Assessment are calling for a ban on the sale of soft drinks to minors with a caffeine content exceeding 150 milligrams per liter. In addition, retailers can decide for themselves to restrict the sale of energy drinks.

=== India ===
In India, the Food Safety and Standards Authority of India (FSSAI) regulates the manufacturing, packaging, labeling, and sale of energy drinks. As recommended by FSSAI, taurine is limited to 2000 mg/day, D-glucuronic-Y-lactone is limited to 1200 mg/day, Inositol is limited to 100 mg/day, and pantothenic acid is limited to 10 mg/day.

=== Latvia ===
In June 2016, Latvia banned the sale of energy drinks containing caffeine or stimulants like taurine and guarana to people under the age of 18, as well as limited advertising of the drinks and mandated speci. Currently, energy drinks are taxed with the same rate as sugary drinks containing more than 8 g of sugar per liter, with the excise being €17.50 per every 100 liters since 2024. It is expected to rise to €21 by 2026.

=== Lithuania ===
In November 2014, Lithuania became the first country in the EU to ban the selling of energy drinks to anyone under the age of 18. The Baltic state placed the ban in reaction to research showing how popular energy drinks were among minors. According to AFP reports, roughly 10% of school-aged Lithuanians say they consume energy drinks at least once a week.

=== Mali ===
In August 2015, a special tax of 12% was imposed on energy drinks.

=== Norway ===
Since 1 January 2026, the purchase of energy drinks has been prohibited for individuals under the age of 16.

Norway did not allow Red Bull for a time due to the high caffeine and taurine content. Classified as a drug, only limited amounts were allowed to be imported for personal use. In May 2009, it became legal to sell in Norway as the ban was in conflict with the European Economic Area's laws on free competition. The Norwegian version has reduced levels of vitamin B6.

The Norwegian Food Safety Authority initially recommended an age limit on the sale of energy drinks in 2019. In 2024 the Norwegian Consumer Council called for an age limit after seeing energy drink sales increase dramatically since 2019. The Food Safety Authority, as of 2024, now disagrees with an age limit as it states it is hard to ascertain if children, specifically, are drinking more energy drinks. In 2023 a majority of Norwegians supported an age limit on energy drink purchases.

=== Poland ===
Since 1 January 2024, the purchase of energy drinks has been prohibited for individuals under the age of 18.

Polish law defines an energy drink as a beverage containing a minimum 15 milligrams of caffeine per 100 milliliters or any drink containing taurine. Regulations ban advertising of these products, and require manufacturers to include a description of the product on each label.

=== South Africa ===
Legislation is in place that requires manufacturers to label energy drinks with more than 150 mg per liter of caffeine with a "clearly legible message" on the nutrition label declaring "high caffeine content" and says "Not recommended for children under 12 years of age, pregnant women, or persons sensitive to caffeine." An issue with this legislation is that there is no prescribed color- or type-setting restrictions, allowing for producers of energy drinks to obscure this warning via package design.

=== Spain ===
The Spanish Agency for Food Safety and Nutrition (AESAN) recommends that children and adolescents, pregnant women, and women who are breastfeeding refrain from consuming energy drinks.

On 16 December 2025, the autonomous community of Galicia, Spain, announced a new regulation prohibiting the sale of energy drinks to individuals under the age of 18. The rule, which came into effect on 7 March 2026, classifies energy drinks alongside alcoholic beverages for the purpose of age-restricted sales. Retailers who violate the prohibition may face fines of up to €3,000.

=== Sweden ===
There is no Swedish law prohibiting the sale of energy drinks based on age. In 2009, the Swedish Retail Trade Association published an industry agreement to monitor and prohibit energy drink sales to children under 15 years old.

A 2026 report by the Nordic Co-operation stated that Swedish children had the highest consumption of energy drinks among youth in Nordic countries, with 28% consuming one or more per day and 75% having at least one per week.

In 2026, the Swedish National Food Agency issued a dietary guideline stating that children under age 16 should limit energy drink consumption to restrict caffeine intake to 70 milligrams per day (the amount in about two cans of cola).

=== Russia ===
In November 2012, President Ramzan Kadyrov of Chechnya (Russian Federation) ordered his government to develop a bill banning the sale of energy drinks, arguing that as a form of "intoxicating drug", such drinks were "unacceptable in a Muslim society". Kadyrov cited reports of one death and 530 hospital admissions in 2012 due to "poisoning" from the consumption of such drinks. A similar view was expressed by Gennady Onishchenko, Chief Sanitary Inspector of Russia,Although as of 2026 there is no ban on energy drinks in Chechnya nor in Russia proper.

=== United Kingdom ===
In 2001, the UK Committee on Toxicity investigated Red Bull, finding it safe but issuing a warning against its consumption by children and pregnant women.

In 2009, a school in Hove, England, requested that local shops refrain from selling energy drinks to students. Headteacher Malvina Sanders added that "This was a preventative measure, as all research shows that consuming high-energy drinks can have a detrimental impact on the ability of young people to concentrate in class." The school negotiated for their local branch of the Tesco supermarket to display posters asking students not to purchase the products. Similar measures were taken by a school in Oxted, England, which banned students from consuming drinks and sent letters to parents.

While not yet age-restricted by legislation, all major UK supermarkets have agreed to voluntarily stop the sale of energy drinks to under-16s. The UK government plans to end the sale of energy drinks to under-16s in the future.

In January 2018, many UK supermarkets banned the sale of energy drinks containing more than 150 mg of caffeine per liter to people under 16 years old; this was followed by the UK government announcing that it planned to ban all sales of energy drinks to minors in 2019. However, in 2022 such plans were reported to have been scrapped by Health Secretary Sajid Javid.

In September 2025, it was reported that England is planning to ban individuals under 16 from buying energy drinks. This ban shall come into effect by April 2027.

=== United States ===
As of 2013 in the United States, some energy drinks, including Monster Energy and Rockstar Energy, were reported to be rebranding their products as drinks rather than as dietary supplements. As drinks they would be relieved of FDA reporting requirements with respect to deaths and injuries and can be purchased with food stamps, but must list ingredients on the can.

Some places ban the sale of prepackaged caffeinated alcoholic drinks, which can be described as energy drinks containing alcohol. In response to these bans, the marketers can change the formula of their products.

In terms of labeling, caffeine must be disclosed on the product label. The specific amount of caffeine, however, does not have to be specified.

In 2013, the US Senate Commerce Committee requested 16 energy drink manufacturers to voluntarily agree not to market to children under 18.

In 2014, the American Beverage Association published "Guidelines for the Responsible Labeling and Marketing of EDs", encouraging companies that produce energy drinks to voluntarily report the total caffeine content from all sources, limit marketing directed at children, and report adverse health effects to the Food and Drug Administration.

=== Uzbekistan ===
In January 2019, President Shavkat Mirziyoyev of Uzbekistan signed a law that imposes a number of restrictions on energy drinks. To protect the younger generation, a rule was introduced prohibiting the sale of energy drinks to persons under the age of 18. Advertising of energy drinks was prohibited on television and radio from 7:00 to 22:00. It was also completely banned in printed publications intended primarily for children and adolescents, in medical, sports and educational institutions.

== See also ==
- List of energy drinks
- Sport drink
- Elixir
- Soft drink
- Caffeinated alcoholic drinks
