= List of energy drinks =

The following is a notable list of energy drinks, with a few coffee variants, and some soft drinks such as Coca-Cola, Mountain Dew, and Pepsi listed for comparison, and marked in a different color. The caffeine content in coffee and tea varies, depending on how the coffee beans were roasted, among other factors.

== Energy drinks ==
Energy drink	Caffeine (mg/litre)	Caffeine (mg/US fl oz)	Caffeine per serving (quantity)	Additional notes					
5-hour Energy	3,504	104	200 mg (1.93 fl oz or 57.1 mL)						
Alani Nu	564	16.67	200 mg						
AMP Energy (UK)	310	9.17	155 mg (500 mL)	Released in the UK in 2013 under the Mountain Dew brand and was only available in 500 mL cans. It contained a higher caffeine content compared to Mountain Dew AMP.					
Bacchus-F	303	9.1	30 mg (3.38 fl oz or 100 mL)						
Bang Energy	634	18.75	300 mg (16 fl oz or 473 mL)						
Bawls Guarana	223	6.70	56 mg (8.45 fl oz or 250 mL)						
Beaver Buzz	449	13.3	110 mg (8.3 fl oz or 245 mL)	Values applicable to Citrus and Saskatoon Berry flavours only.	Black Horse Energy Drink	Bloom Sparkling Energy	507	15	180 mg (12 fl oz or 355 mL)
Bomb Energy Drink	320	9.6	80 mg (8.45 fl oz or 250 mL)	Sold in 250 mL cans (8.45 fl oz).					
Bucked Up			300 mg (Per 16 fl oz can 473 ml)	Five different Drink types. As of this entry, has 14 flavor options, per drink type.					
Burn	320	9.6	80 mg (8.3 fl oz or 250 mL)						
C4 Energy	423	12.5	200 mg (16 fl oz or 473 mL)	Owned by Cellucor. Up to 300 mg (16 fl oz or 473 mL) in its Ultimate Energy version (634 mg/L).					
Celsius	588	16.7	200 mg (12 fl oz or 355 mL)						
Club-Mate	200	5.95	(100 mg (500 mL)						
Coca-Cola Blāk	194	5.75	46 mg (8 fl oz or 237 mL)						
Cocaine Energy Supplement	790	23.33	280 mg (12 fl oz or 355 mL)						
Crunk Energy Drink	422	12.5	100 mg (8 fl oz or 237 mL)						
Emerge Stimulation Drink	300	8.87	75 mg per 250 mL can						
Enviga	282	8.3	100 mg (12 fl oz or 355 mL)						
Full Throttle	304	9	72 mg (8 fl oz or 237 mL)						
G Fuel	620	18.75	300 mg (16 fl oz or 473 mL)						
Good Game by T-Pain	3,383	100	200 mg (2 fl oz or 59 mL)	Zero-sugar nootropic energy shot co-founded by T-Pain. Available in Strawberry Surge and Orange Vanilla Vortex. Manufactured in the USA and distributed nationally through the convenience channel.					
Ghost Energy			200 mg (Per 16 fl oz can 473 ml)	21-23 different Drink flavors, as of this entry.					
Glacéau VitaminEnergy	317	9.375	150 mg (16 fl oz or 473 mL)						
Gorilla Energy	320	9.47	144 mg (15.22 fl oz or 450 mL)						
Hell Energy	320	10.82	80 mg (8.4 fl oz or 250 mL)						
Hype Energy	320	10.82	160 mg (16.9 fl oz or 500 mL)						
Irn-Bru 32	320	9.47	32 mg (3.38 fl oz or 100 mL) 80 mg (8.45 fl oz or 250 mL)						
Jolt Cola	201	5.96	140 mg (23.5 fl oz or 695 mL)						
Juvee	361	10.67	128 mg (12 fl oz or 355 mL)						
Kore	400	11.83	100 mg (8.45 fl oz or 250 mL)						
Mountain Dew AMP	298	8.93	71 mg (8 fl oz or 237 mL)						
Kickstart	92	2.76	90 mg (16 fl oz or 473 mL)	Marketed as a breakfast drink.					
Lift Plus	80	2.4	16 mg						
Lipovitan	500	14.79	50 mg (3.38 fl oz or 100mL)						
Liquid Death	43	12	43 mg (12 fl oz)						
Liquid X	120	3.55	16 mg						
Lucozade Sport with Caffeine Boost	160	4.73	16 mg (3.38 fl oz or 100 mL)						
Lucky Energy			200 mg (Per 16 oz can 473 ml)	Ten different Drink flavors, as of this entry.					
Monster	338	10	80 mg (8 fl oz or 240 mL)	Sold in 8, 12, 16, 24, 32oz cans; 16oz can with two servings per can yields 160 mg caffeine.					
Mother	320	9.5	160 mg (500)						
Mountain Dew Energy	180	5.32	90 mg (500mL)						
Mountain Dew MDX	199	5.88	47 mg (8 fl oz or 237 mL)						
NOCCO	550	15.6	180 mg (for a 330 mL can)						
NOS	338	10	80 mg (8 fl oz or 240 mL)	Sold in 13.5, 16 and 22 oz containers that contain a total of 219, 260 and 357 mg of caffeine, respectively.					
NRG	350	9.5	80 mg (8.4 fl oz or 250 mL)	Brand no longer available. Produced in 1997-2001					
Ntense	338	10	160 mg (16 fl oz or 480 mL)	Dollar General store brand					
Paper Boat (Sparkling Coffee)	250	7.39	150 mg (20.29 fl oz or 600 mL)	Stated caffeine: 25 mg/100 mL.					
Power Horse	320	10		Launched in 1994 by the Austrian food company S. Spitz.					
Prime	300	8.87	200 Mg						
Pussy	320	9.46	80 mg (250 mL)	Lychee and Grenadilla flavoured, with Guarana 530 mg, Siberian Ginseng 114 mg, Milk Thistle 286 mg, Ginkgo Biloba 109 mg, Schizandra 112 mg, Sarsaparilla 103 mg					
Red Bull	325	9.625	77 mg (8 fl oz or 240 mL)	110 calories					
Red Rooster	300	8.88	30 mg (3.38 fl oz or 100 mL); 75 mg (8.45 fl oz or 250 mL)						
Reign			300 mg (Per 16 oz can 473 ml)	Fourteen different Drink types, as of this entry.					
Relentless	321	9.64	160 mg (16.91 fl oz or 500 mL)						
RELOAD	394	11.8	130 mg (11.16 fl oz or 330 mL)						
Rich Energy			80 mg (Per 250 ml can)						
Riot Energy			160 mg (Per 16 oz can 473 ml)	Five different Drink flavors, As of this entry. Motto is: "Zero Artificial Anything."					
Rip It	431	12.75	102 mg (8 fl oz or 240 mL)						
Rockstar	338	10	80 mg (8 fl oz or 237 mL) 160 mg (16 fl oz or 480 mL)	2,000 mg Taurine (16 fl oz or 480 mL)					
Rowdy Energy	338	10	160 mg (16 fl oz or 480 mL)						
Semtex	320	9.47	80 mg (8.5 fl oz or 250 mL)						
Shark Energy	320	9.47	32 mg (3.38 fl oz or 100 mL)						
SoBe Adrenaline Rush	312	9.23	78 mg (8.45 fl oz or 250 mL)	Sold in 250 mL cans.					
Sparks (contains 6% ABV)	185	5.44	87 mg (16 fl oz or 480 mL)						
Sting Energy Drink	250	7.39	82.5 mg (11.16 fl oz or 330 mL)						
Street King	1200	35.71	300 mg (8.45 fl oz or 250 mL)						
Tab Energy	304	9.0	72 mg (8 fl oz or 237 mL)						
Tenzing	320	9.09	80mg (8.8 fl oz or 250ml) 105.6mg (11.6 fl oz or 330ml) 160mg (17.6 fl oz or 500ml)						
Tru Energy Seltzer	282	8.33	100 mg (12 fl oz 355 mL)						
Urge Intense	150	4.4	75						
Uptime	400	11.83	142 mg (12 fl oz)						
V (Australia, United Kingdom, New Zealand or Netherlands only)	287	8.61	31 mg (3.38 fl oz or 100 mL) 78 mg (8.45 fl oz or 250 mL)						
V8 +Energy	338	10	80 mg (8 fl oz; 237 mL)						
Vault	196	5.88	47 mg (8 fl oz or 237 mL) 70.5 mg (12 fl oz 355 mL); 117.5 mg (20 fl oz or 591 mL)						
Venom Energy	160	4.8	160 mg (16.9 fl oz or 500 mL)	Sold in 16 fl oz (473 mL) bottles. Comes in 4 flavors and 1 energy shot.					
XS Energy Drink	334	9.88	83 mg (8.45 fl oz or 250 mL)						
Xyience	160								
Verve	32.59	3.18	80 mg (245 mL)						
ZOA Energy	338	10	160 mg (473 mL)						

== Comparison with other beverages ==
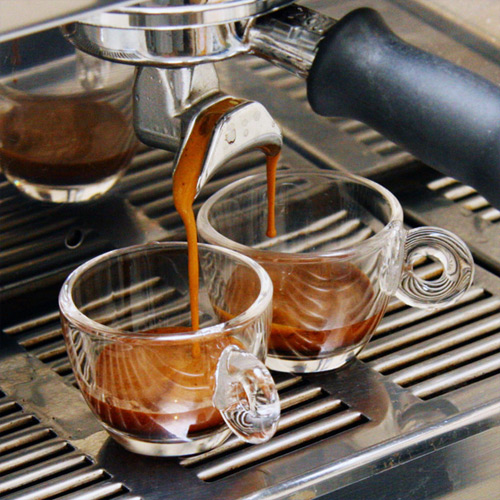
Espresso is a coffee brewed by forcing a small amount of nearly boiling water under pressure through finely ground coffee beans. The term "espresso" comes from the Italian esprimere, which means "to express," and refers to the process by which hot water is forced under pressure through ground coffee.

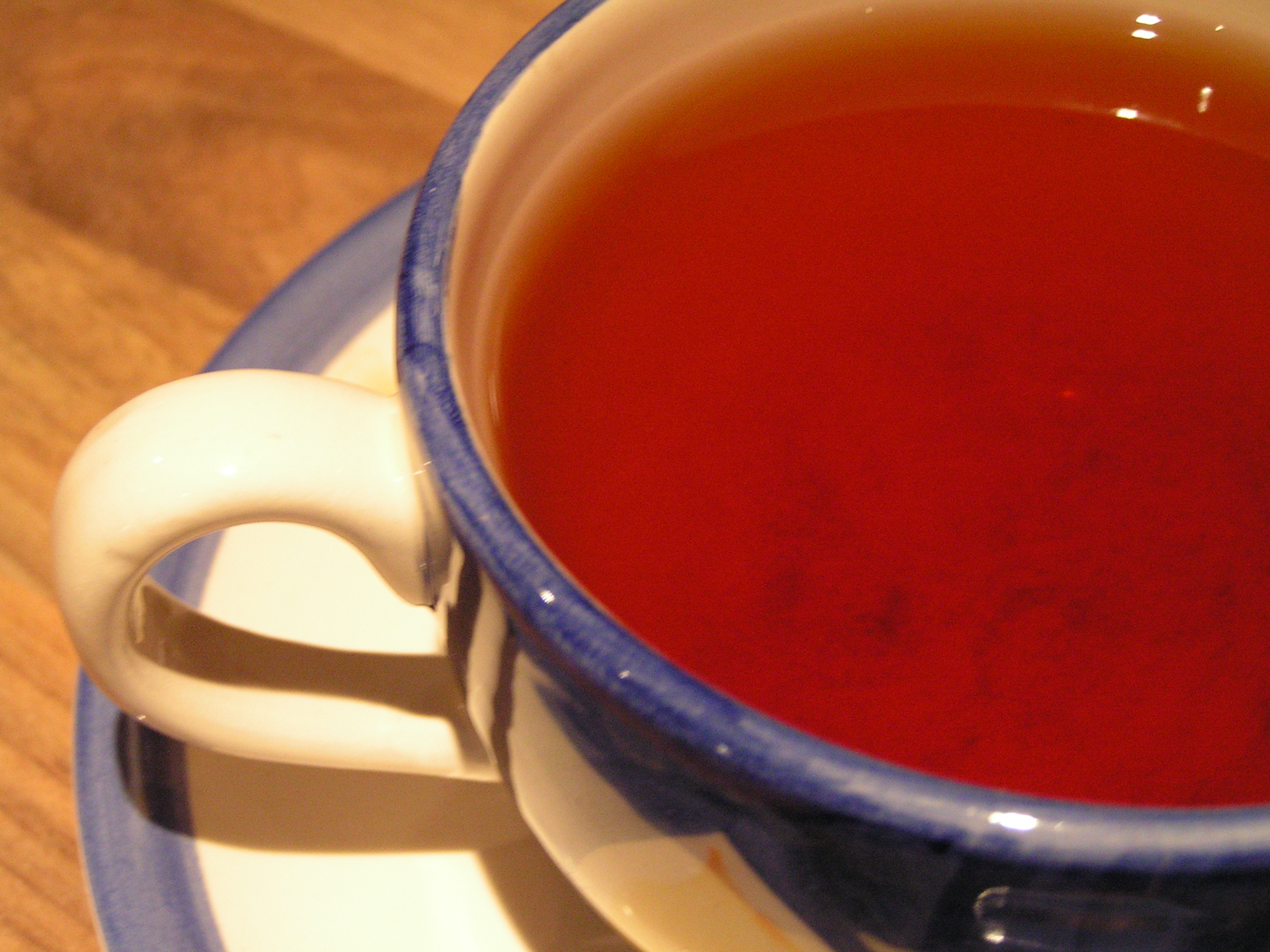
Black tea infusion

Drink	Caffeine (mg/L)	Caffeine (mg/fl oz)	Mass
Coca-Cola Classic	100.05	2.875	23 mg (8 fl oz or 237 mL)
Cola	95–130	2.8–3.9	34–46 mg (12 fl oz or 355 mL)
Cola (Diet)	110–141	3.25–4.16	39–50 mg (12 fl oz or 355 mL)
Coffee, brewed	230–580 (varies)	7–16 (varies)	56–128 mg (8 fl oz/237 mL/1 cup)
Coffee, instant	300–467 (varies)	9–14 (varies)	71–111 mg (8 fl oz/237 mL/1 cup)
Espresso	600–1700 (varies)	20–50 (varies)	36–102 mg (2 fl oz or 59.15 mL)
Dr Pepper (in the United Kingdom, United States, Holland, The Seychelles, Brunei, and Malta)	187	4.62	37 mg (8 fl oz or 237 mL); 55 mg (12 fl oz or 355 mL)
Pepsi	104	3.08	25 mg (8 fl oz or 237 mL); 37 mg (12 fl oz or 355 mL)
Tea	169–211 (varies)	5–6.33 (varies)	40–50 mg (8 fl oz or 237 mL)

== Unsorted ==
- Boost Drinks
- Revo
- Rich Energy
