= Reload =

Reload or Reloaded may refer to:

== Film ==
- Reloaded (2009 film), a Nigerian film
- Reloaded (2017 film), a Hindi-language film
- Reload (film), a 2019 Sri Lankan comedy thriller film
- The Matrix Reloaded, the second installment of the Matrix film franchise

== Music ==
- Reload, project by Mark Pritchard

=== Albums ===
- Reloaded (DJ BoBo album) (2013)
- Reloaded (Green Apple Quick Step album) (1995)
- Reloaded (Alexz Johnson album) (2011)
- Reload (Tom Jones album) (1999)
- Reloaded (Roc Marciano album) (2012)
- Reload (Metallica album) (1997)
- Reload (EP), a 2020 EP by NCT Dream
- Reloaded (Rascalz album) (2002)
- Reloaded: 20 Number 1 Hits, a 2015 album by Blake Shelton

=== Songs ===
- "Reload" (Sebastian Ingrosso and Tommy Trash song) (2012)
- "Reload" (Wiley song) (2013)
- "Reload", a 2003 song by Rob Zombie on The Matrix Reloaded: The Album
- "Reload", a 2017 song by T-ara on What's My Name?

== Video games ==
- Re-Loaded, a 1996 shooter video game, successor of Loaded
- GoldenEye 007: Reloaded, an enhanced port of the 2010 remake of the video game GoldenEye 007
- Tomb Raider Reloaded, a mobile re-imaging of the first Tomb Raider video game

== Other uses ==
- Reloading, the act of requesting the displayed web page again from a server, typically to look for changes.
- Another term for Handloading, the small scale manufacture of firearm cartridges; specifically when using previously fired cartridges.
- Reload (energy drink), an energy drink by Bigg Juice Industries, Inc
- Reloaded (warez), a warez group founded in 2004
- REsource LOcation And Discovery Framing (RELOAD), an internet signalling protocol
- Reloaded, the 2023 second volume of the comic book series Nemesis

== See also ==
- Reloading scam
