= Emerge =

Emerge may refer to:

- Emerge: The Best of Neocolours, the fourth album of Neocolours
- Emerge (magazine), a defunct news magazine
- Emerge Stimulation Drink, a drink sold in UK Supermarkets
- "Emerge" (song), a song by Fischerspooner
- emerge, a command-line tool at the heart of the Portage package management system
- Emerge, a frontend for the diff and diff3 commands for Emacs

== See also ==
- Emergence, a concept in philosophy, systems theory and science
