= Samvardhana Motherson =

Indian automotive components company

Samvardhana Motherson International Limited
- Type: Public
- Traded as: BSE: 517334; NSE: MOTHERSON
- Industry: Automotive
- Founded: 1986
- Founder: S. L. Sehgal; Vivek Chaand Sehgal
- Headquarters: Noida, Uttar Pradesh, India
- Key people: Vivek Chaand Sehgal (Chairman); Laksh Vaaman Sehgal (Vice Chairman)
- Products: Automotive parts
- Revenue: ▲₹113,663 crore (US$12 billion) (2025)
- Operating income: ▲₹10,877 crore (US$1.1 billion) (2025)
- Net income: ▲₹3,803 crore (US$390 million) (2025)
- Total assets: ▲₹92,847 crore (US$9.6 billion) (2025)
- Total equity: ▲₹37,128 crore (US$3.9 billion) (2025)
- Owners: Sehgal family (50.4%); Sumitomo Wiring Systems (9.73%)
- Number of employees: 129,000
- Subsidiaries: Samvardhana Motherson Peguform; Samvardhana Motherson Reflectec; PKC Group
- Website: Official website
- Footnotes; Financials as of 31 March 2025.

Samvardhana Motherson International Ltd (formerly known as Motherson Sumi Systems Ltd) is an Indian multinational manufacturer of automotive components, based in Noida, Uttar Pradesh. It makes wiring harnesses, plastic components and rearview mirrors for passenger cars. The company was established in 1986 as a joint venture with the Sumitomo Group of Japan.

== History ==
=== 1975-1999 ===
In 1975, Vivek Chaand Sehgal and his mother established the Motherson Group as a silver trading business. Two years later, Sehgal set up a power cables factory. A collaboration with Tokai Electric Co. (now Sumitomo Wiring Systems) in 1983 led to the incorporation of Motherson Sumi Systems in 1986, primarily as a wiring harness manufacturer for Maruti Udyog. The company was listed in 1993 on BSE and subsequently on NSE.

=== 2000-2019 ===
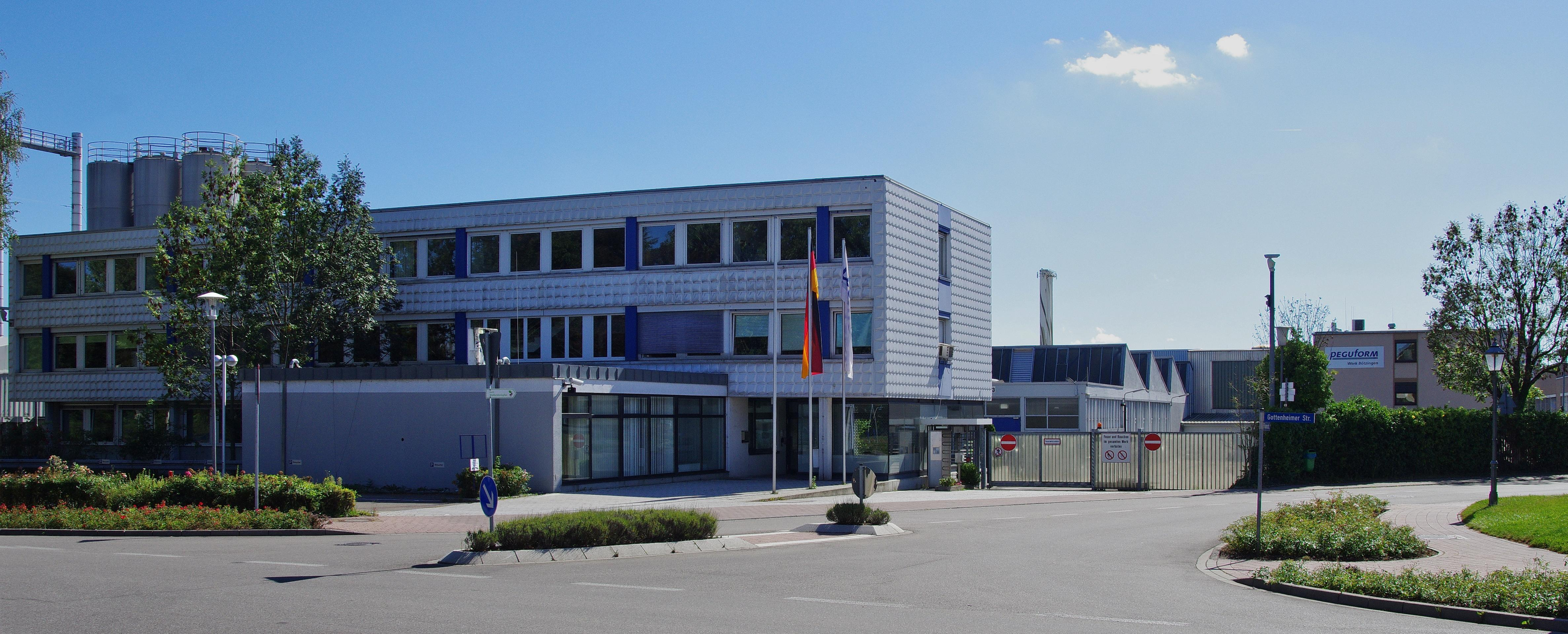
Samvardhana Motherson Peguform in Bötzingen, Germany.

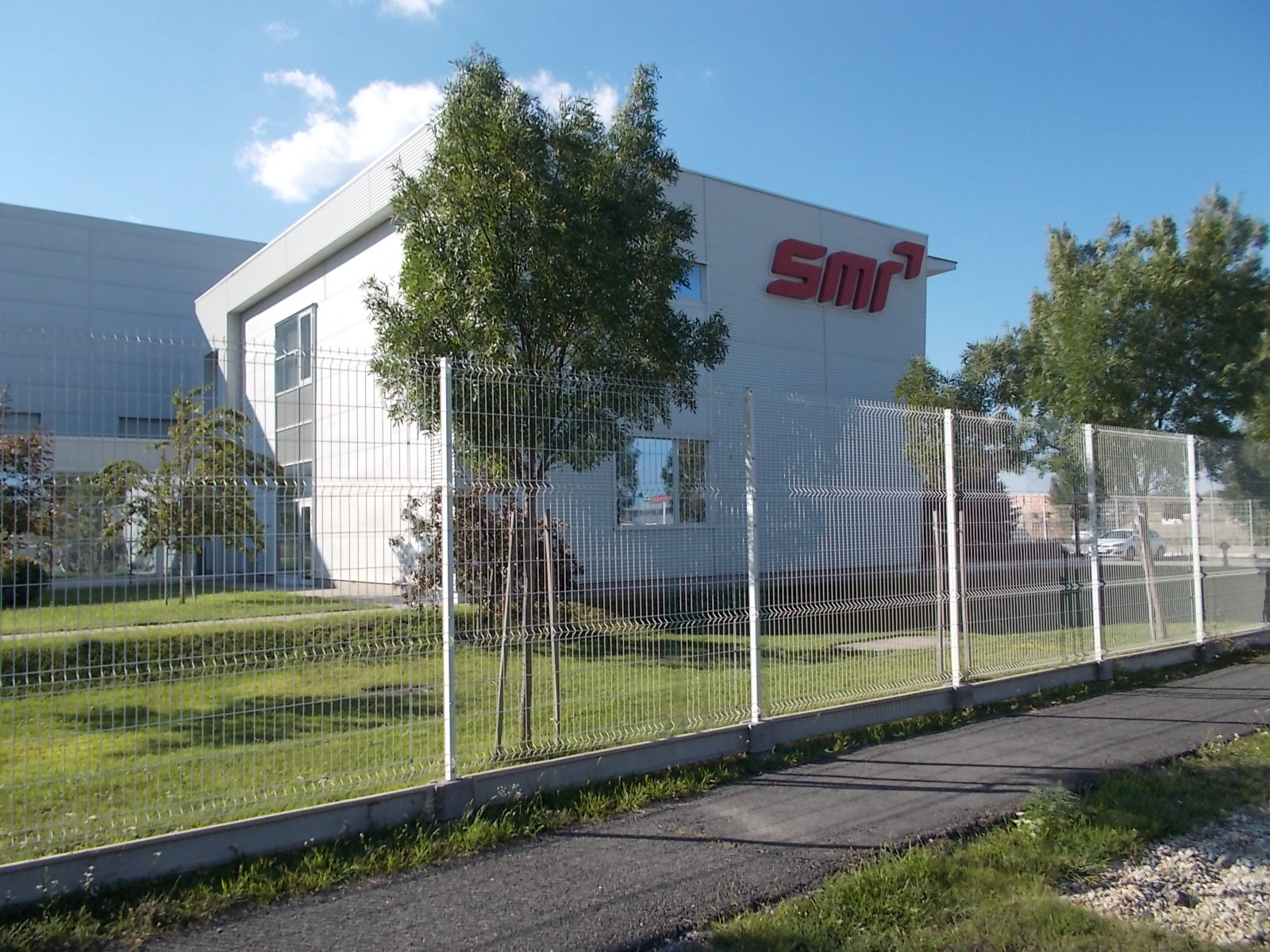
Samvardhana Motherson Reflectec in Mosonmagyaróvár, Hungary.

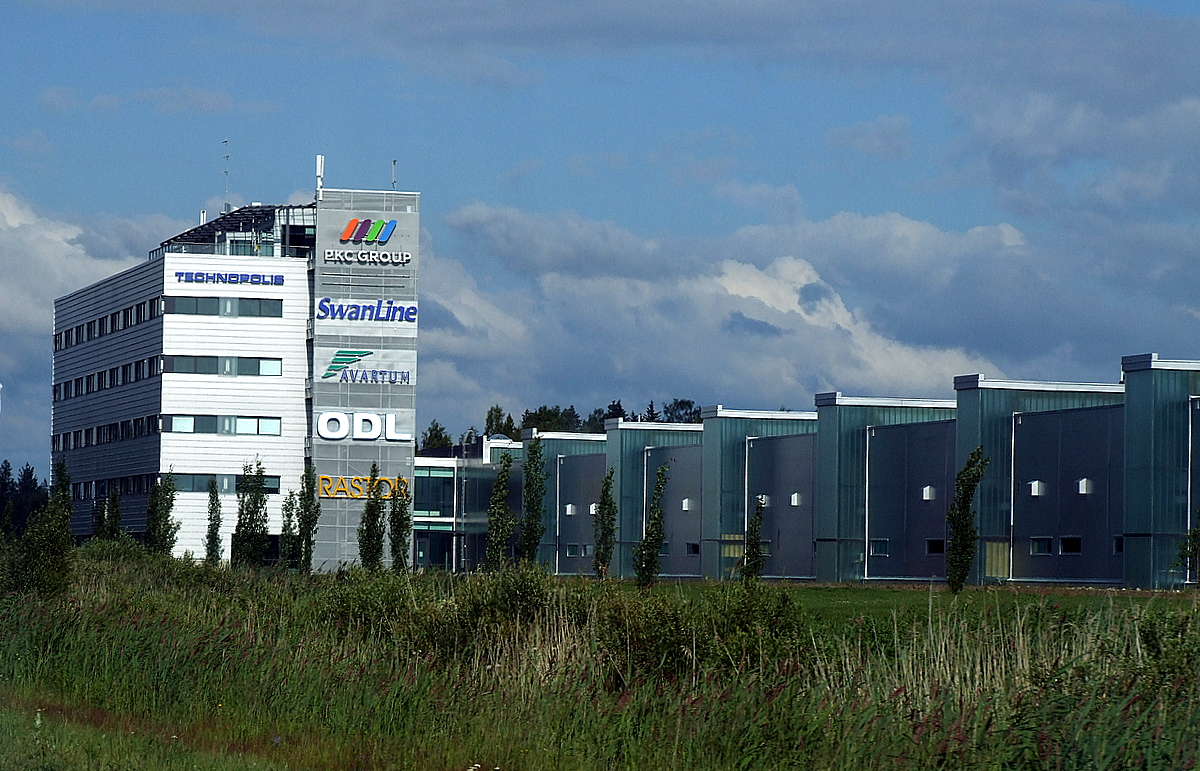
PKC Group office in Kempele, Finland.

Motherson Sumi Systems went on to acquire several companies, the first being in 2002 when it acquired the assets of the bankrupt Irish company Wexford Electronics, a manufacturer of wiring harnesses for material handling and earthmoving equipment. In 2006, it purchased the Australian company Empire Rubber. In 2009, it acquired the global rearview mirror business of the world's largest rearview mirror maker Visiocorp (now renamed as Samvardhana Motherson Reflectec). In 2011, it acquired the German interior and exterior polymer modules maker Peguform (now named Samvardhana Motherson Peguform).

In 2014, it bought the wiring harness business of Stoneridge Inc for $65.7 million. This was followed by the acquisition of Finnish electrical distribution systems manufacturer PKC Group in 2017 for $619 million, French interior components maker Reydel Automotives (now named Samvardhana Motherson Reydel Companies) in 2018 for $201 million, and Bombardier Transportation's UK electrical component and systems business in 2019.

=== 2020-present ===
In 2020, the domestic wiring harness business was restructured under a newly incorporated, wholly owned subsidiary of Motherson Sumi Systems called Motherson Sumi Wiring India Limited (MSWIL). MSWIL was subsequently demerged and became a listed company in 2022. At the time of its listing, Samvardhana Motherson International held a 33.4% stake in MSWIL, while 25.3% was held by Sumitomo Wiring Systems, 3% by Sehgal family and the rest by public investors.

After this demerger, the holding company of the group Samvardhana Motherson International Limited, which held stakes in Motherson Sumi Systems and the unlisted global components maker Samvardhana Motherson Automotive Components Group BV (SMRPBV), was merged into Motherson Sumi Systems; the merged entity was renamed as Samvardhana Motherson International Limited. After the merger, Sehgal family held a 50.4% majority stake in the merged entity followed by Sumitomo Wiring Systems at 17.7%.

In 2022, the company acquired Ichikoh's mirror manufacturing division for ¥5.2 billion (US$47.38 million). Samvardhana Motherson's notable acquisitions in 2023 include 51% stake in Saddles International, an Indian automotive upholstery company, for ₹207 crore (US$21 million); 100% of SAS Autosystemtechnik, a German automotive cockpit manufacturer, from Faurecia at an enterprise value of €540 million; 81% stake in the four-wheeler business of Yachiyo Industry, a Honda Group company, for ¥22.9 billion (US$208.66 million); and the insolvent German automotive supplier Dr. Schneider Group for €118.3 million.

== Products ==
The products manufactured by Samvardhana Motherson Group comprises wiring harnesses (electrical distribution systems), rearview mirrors, moulded plastic parts including car interior and exterior parts, bumpers, dashboards and door trims, complete polymer modules, rubber components for automotive and industrial applications, high precision machined metal parts and injection moulding tools.
