= Tyrrell 026 =

Formula One racing car

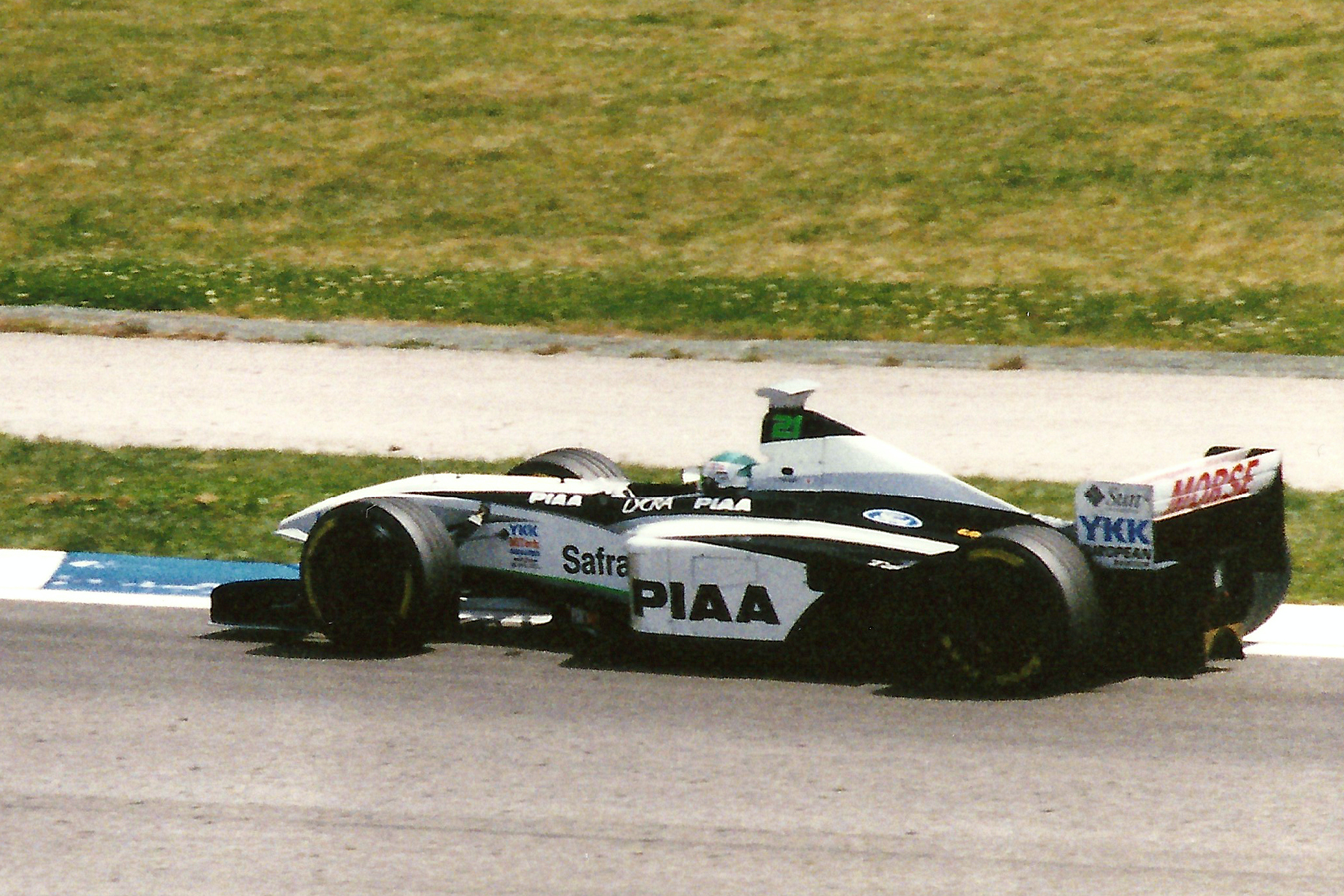
- Toranosuke Takagi driving the Tyrrell 026 at the 1998 Spanish Grand Prix.
- Category: Formula One
- Constructor: Tyrrell
- Designers: Harvey Postlethwaite (Technical Director); Mike Gascoyne (Deputy Technical Director); Tim Densham (Chief Designer); Ben Agathangelou (Head of Aerodynamics)
- Predecessor: 025
- Successor: BAR 01

Technical specifications
- Chassis: carbon-fibre and honeycomb composite structure
- Suspension (front): double wishbones, pushrod, horizontal coil-spring/damper
- Suspension (rear): double wishbones, pushrod, horizontal coil-spring/damper
- Engine: Ford-Cosworth JD Zetec-R, 3.0-litre 72-degree V10
- Transmission: Tyrrell six-speed longitudinal sequential semi-automatic
- Power: 710 hp (529 kW) @ 15,000 rpm
- Fuel: Elf
- Tyres: Goodyear

Competition history
- Notable entrants: PIAA Tyrrell Racing
- Notable drivers: 20. (Brazil) Ricardo Rosset; 21. (Japan) Toranosuke Takagi
- Debut: 1998 Australian Grand Prix
- Last event: 1998 Japanese Grand Prix
Races	Wins	Poles	F/Laps
16	0	0	0
- Constructors' Championships: 0
- Drivers' Championships: 0

The Tyrrell 026 was the car with which the Tyrrell team competed in the 1998 Formula One World Championship and was the final Tyrrell car to compete in F1.

== Background ==
=== Ownership by British American Tobacco (BAT) ===
1998 was Tyrrell's final year in F1, as Ken Tyrrell had sold the team to British American Racing prior to the first race. Paul Stoddart had almost bought the team prior to BAR's takeover, but the BAR deal had already been finalized. Stoddart's European Aviation sponsored the team and provided transportation during the season.

=== Design ===
Tyrrell left the team soon afterward BAR's takeover in anger, after Rosset was chosen to drive alongside Takagi, rather than 1997 Tyrrell driver Jos Verstappen. The team had a V10 engine and a reasonable chassis, but the season was seen as a holding year before BAR took over in 1999. The car retained the tower sidepod mounted wings introduced by Tyrrell the year before. The wings had been copied by other teams but were banned partway into the season.

== Season overview ==
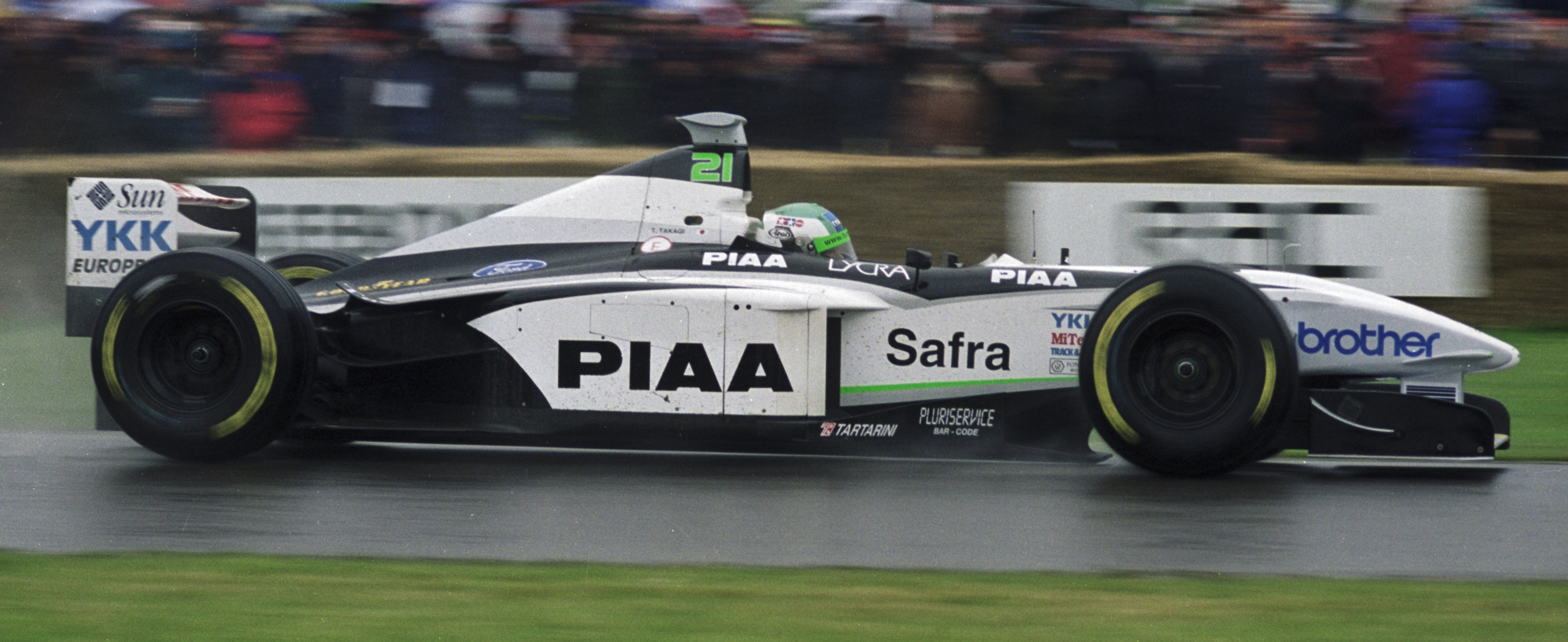
Tyrrell 026 at the 1998 Goodwood Festival of Speed

Ken Tyrrell preferred to retain Verstappen but new team principal Craig Pollock signed Rosset due to his superior sponsorship money. Tyrrell was so incensed at this that he quit the team before the first race. Rosset failed the 107% qualifying cutoff on five occasions, and his performance at Monaco infuriated his mechanics so much that they defaced his paddock scooter, changing the letters in 'Rosset' to spell 'tosser'.

Rosset finished eighth in Canada, which was ultimately the team's best result of the season, but was in danger of losing his seat to Danish driver Tom Kristensen. At a test at Magny-Cours, Rosset and Takagi posted almost equal times, with Kristensen around half a second slower, albeit with an older engine. Rosset said in 2019 that Kristensen drove the same car as he did, with only a change of seat and minor adjustments. Rosset went on to outqualify Takagi at the following race at the same circuit, the French Grand Prix.

For the first few races, X-wings were used, but they were banned after the San Marino Grand Prix.

The team was unclassified in the Constructors' Championship, with no points but behind Minardi due to the Italian team having a better finishing record.

== Livery ==
As with the previous season, the 026 was painted in white and black with an additional silver accents. Other additional colours were added; orange for Takagi and green for Rosset. PIAA was the team's title sponsor for the second and final year before switching into Arrows.

== Aftermath ==
The two 026s raced by Takagi and Rosset were later owned by Frits van Eerd. He raced the cars in the EuroBOSS series.

Paul Stoddart bought most of the team's assets including the 026 chassis, which formed the basis of his Minardi F1x2 two seater cars.

== Complete Formula One results ==
(key) (results in bold indicate pole position)

Year	Entrant	Engine	Tyres	Drivers	1	2	3	4	5	6	7	8	9	10	11	12	13	14	15	16	Points	WCC
1998	PIAA Tyrrell	Ford JD Zetec-R V10	**G**		AUS	BRA	ARG	SMR	ESP	MON	CAN	FRA	GBR	AUT	GER	HUN	BEL	ITA	LUX	JPN	**0**	**NC**
1998	PIAA Tyrrell	Ford JD Zetec-R V10	**G**	Ricardo Rosset	Ret	Ret	14	Ret	DNQ	DNQ	8	Ret	Ret	12	DNQ	DNQ	DNS	12	Ret	DNQ	**0**	**NC**
1998	PIAA Tyrrell	Ford JD Zetec-R V10	**G**	Toranosuke Takagi	Ret	Ret	12	Ret	13	11	Ret	Ret	9	Ret	13	14	Ret	9	16	Ret	**0**	**NC**
