= Blue Sky Beverage Company =

Beverage company

- Type: Subsidiary
- Founded: 1980
- Headquarters: Corona, California, US
- Products: Soft drinks, energy drinks
- Parent: The Coca-Cola Company
- Website: www.drinkbluesky.com

Blue Sky Beverage Company was a beverage company that produced soft drinks and energy drinks. The company was established in Santa Fe, New Mexico, in 1980, where it remained until it was purchased by Hansen Beverage Company in 2000. It was later acquired by Coca-Cola North America as part of Coke's partnership with Monster Beverage Corp on June 12, 2015.

Coca Cola ceased production of all products by Blue Sky and Hansen's Natural Sodas in 2021.

The company offered several beverage lines that promoted a natural lifestyle including organic, all-natural, calorie-free, and tea soda brands. The southwestern look and feel of the artwork on the soda cans was reminiscent of the company's roots in New Mexico. The original line of all natural sodas was introduced in 1983. It also manufactured a line of energy drinks. Its products were available throughout the US and Canada in natural food and grocery store markets.

== Sodas ==
=== Cane Sugar Soda ===
This soda line came in cans. It was made of all-natural ingredients and is free of high fructose corn syrup, caffeine and preservatives. Blue Sky listed eight flavors of Cane Sugar sodas on their website: Lemon Lime, Root Beer, Ginger Ale, Dr. Becker, Cream Soda, Cola, Cherry Vanilla, and Black Cherry. Other flavors that have been available previously include Wild Raspberry, Orange Creme, Grapefruit, and Grape.

=== Fountain Sodas ===
Like their canned sodas, their fountain soda line was made with cane sugar and is free of high fructose corn syrup. The following fountain flavors were offered: Lemonade, Root Beer, Ginger Ale, Blood Orange, Orange Mango, Cola, and Black Cherry.

=== Blue Sky Zero Sugar ===
Blue Sky Beverage Company launched a zero-calorie, all-natural soft drink line named Blue Sky Free in 2009. As of 2020, this line is now known as Blue Sky Zero Sugar. It is sweetened with stevia leaf extract and erythritol. It comes in several flavors: Cherry Vanilla, Lemon Lime, Ginger Ale, Root Beer, and Cola.

=== Blue Sky Organic Soda ===
Blue Sky Organic Soda is made exclusively from organic ingredients and contains no caffeine or preservatives. Blue Sky has offered five flavors of organic sodas: Black Cherry Cherish, Root Beer Encore, Orange Divine, New Century Cola, and Ginger Ale. As of 2020, this product is no longer listed on the official website.

=== Blue Sky Tea Soda ===
Blue Sky Tea Soda is all-natural with 35 mg of antioxidant ECGC in every serving. It comes in four flavors: Imperial Lime, Raspberry, Pomegranate, and Peach Mist. As of 2020, this product is no longer listed on the official website.

=== Blue Sky Premium Ginseng Soda ===
Blue Sky Premium Ginseng Soda is all-natural with 200 mg of Panax Ginseng. It comes in 4 flavors: Creamy Root Beer, Cola, Pomegranate, and Jamaican Ginger Ale. As of 2020, this product is no longer listed on the official website.

== Energy drinks ==
Blue Sky Beverage Company manufactures also several different energy drinks. "Blue Energy" is an energy drink similar to Red Bull. "Juiced Energy" contains 50% juice. Both "Blue Energy" and "Juiced Energy" come in both 16oz. and 8.3oz cans. "Cafe Energy" is a line of indulgent natural coffee energy drinks that comes in Vanilla Sky and Mocha flavors. "Cafe Energy" is packaged in 15oz. cans.

=== Blue Sky Shots ===
Blue Sky introduced a line of three natural-functional shots in 2.5 oz. shot bottles in 2010. Blue Energy shot is a natural-energy shot with the same functional ingredients as the original Blue Energy drink. Blue Sky Defense Shot with Energy Support is 100% Fruit Juice with the power of Blueberry Mangosteen and a unique functional blend including 1000% DV Vitamin C. Blue Sky Defense Shot with Immune Support is 100% fruit juice with the power of Acai Pomegranate and a unique functional blend, including 400 mg of Echinacea.

== Retired products ==
Blue Sky Lite was a low-calorie beverage line sweetened with Lo Han that the company discontinued in 2008. "Blue Sport" was a line of natural thirst quenchers similar to Gatorade that the company discontinued in 2009.

== Marketing ==
Blue Sky launched a word-of-mouth marketing program called "Wanderers" in 2010.

== Save Pets Send Tabs Program ==
Blue Sky products were made with blue tabs rather than the traditional silver ones. Under the Save Pets Send Tabs program, Blue Sky Beverage Company donated $0.10 to the Humane Society for every blue tab the company received. The program ran from 2005 to 2007.

The new Save Pets Send Tabs program ran from August 2010 until January 2012. The Blue Sky Beverage Company donated $0.05 to the Petfinder.com Foundation for every Blue Sky blue tab received.
