= Tyrrell 025 =

Formula One racing car

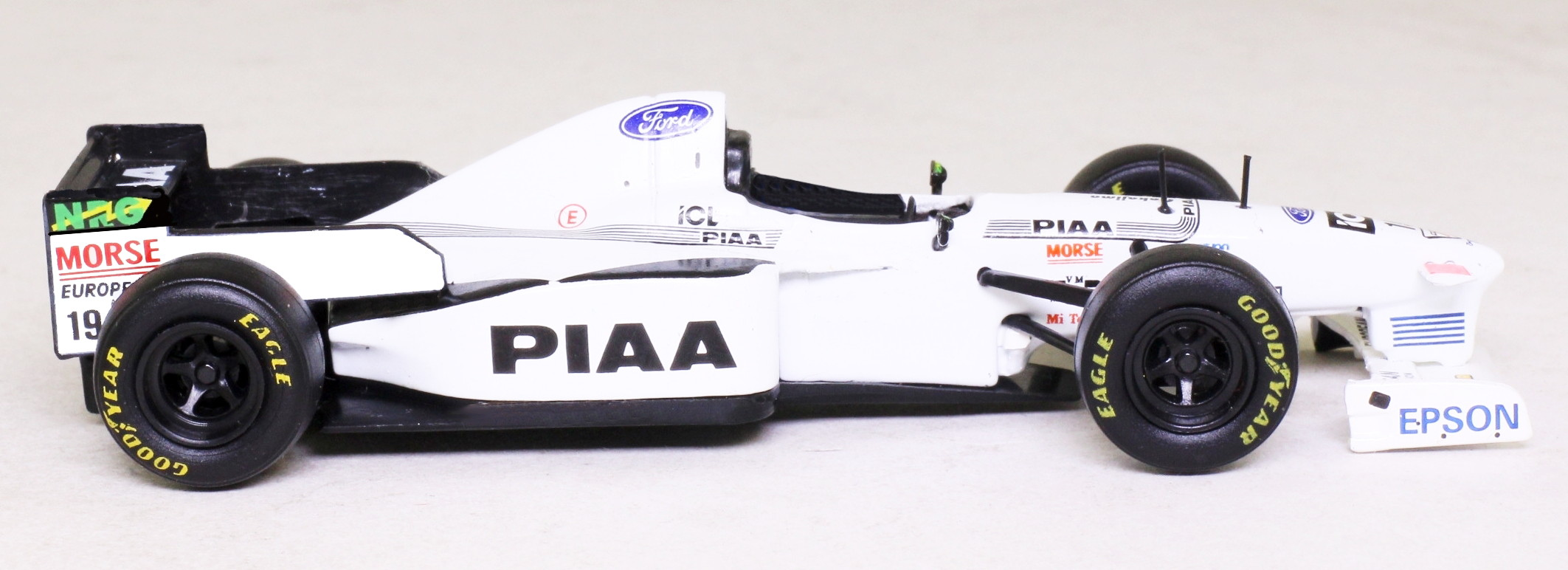
- Category: Formula One
- Constructor: Tyrrell
- Designers: Harvey Postlethwaite (Technical Director); Mike Gascoyne (Chief Engineer-Aerodynamics); Tim Densham (Chief Designer); Ian Cowley (Senior Aerodynamicist)
- Predecessor: 024
- Successor: 026

Technical specifications
- Chassis: carbon-fibre and honeycomb composite structure
- Suspension (front): double wishbones, pushrod, twin damper
- Suspension (rear): double wishbones, pushrod, twin damper
- Engine: Ford-Cosworth ED4/Ford-Cosworth ED5 75-degree V8s
- Transmission: Tyrrell six-speed longitudinal sequential semi-automatic
- Power: 665 hp @ 13,700 rpm
- Fuel: Elf
- Tyres: Goodyear

Competition history
- Notable entrants: PIAA Tyrrell Ford
- Notable drivers: 18. (Netherlands) Jos Verstappen; 19. (Finland) Mika Salo
- Debut: 1997 Australian Grand Prix
- Last event: 1997 European Grand Prix
Races	Wins	Poles	F/Laps
17	0	0	0
- Constructors' Championships: 0
- Drivers' Championships: 0

The Tyrrell 025 was the car with which the Tyrrell team competed in the 1997 Formula One World Championship. It was driven by Finn Mika Salo, who was in his third season with the team, and Dutchman Jos Verstappen, who moved from Footwork.

== Development ==
The 025 was an evolution of the previous year's 024, with Ford V8 engines instead of Yamaha V10s in the interests of reliability. However, this came at the expense of power against the V10 cars.

As ever, the team used a fair degree of technical innovation. The 025 eschewed a double support front wing for a single plane unit aimed at cleaning up airflow under the car. On high-downforce circuits (such as Monaco), two additional wings were installed on either side of the cockpit. To distinguish between the drivers, Verstappen's were painted yellow and Salo's dark orange. These "X-wings" would be banned during 1998 after safety concerns in the pitlane, by which point other teams had begun using them.

== Race history ==
The year was largely disappointing for the team. The chassis was well-balanced, the drivers were quick and the strategy was good but the increase in competitiveness in the sport saw them restricted to a battle with fellow V8 runner Minardi for much of the season. The team's frustration came from the cars often being closer in terms of raw pace to the front-runners than in 1996, but further away on the grid and in the race results.

The team's two points came from an inventive non-stop run from Salo at the 1997 Monaco Grand Prix to finish fifth, despite a damaged front wing. They would prove to be Tyrrell's last points in F1, as Ken Tyrrell subsequently sold the team to British American Tobacco, becoming British American Racing for the 1999 season. Paul Stoddart, later owner of Minardi, became one of the principal sponsors. He almost bought the team and indeed had offered Ken Tyrrell a three-year plan to completely overhaul the team's technical department which included an in-house wind tunnel and use of his European Aviation company's aircraft for the team's transportation but the deal with BAR had already been done.

The team eventually finished tenth in the Constructors' Championship, thanks to the two points earned by Salo at Monaco.

== Livery ==
The 025 was painted in a white and black livery, reflecting their new main sponsor PIAA, which had already sponsored the team in 1991; this sponsorship was made possible through Satoru Nakajima's purchase of a stake in the team. At the British Grand Prix, the team promoted the series Xena: Warrior Princess. On the top of the rear wing panels was the name NRG Energy Drink.

== Complete Formula One results ==
(key) (results in bold indicate pole position)

Year	Team	Engine	Tyres	Drivers	1	2	3	4	5	6	7	8	9	10	11	12	13	14	15	16	17	Points	WCC
1997	Tyrrell	Ford V8	**G**		AUS	BRA	ARG	SMR	MON	ESP	CAN	FRA	GBR	GER	HUN	BEL	ITA	AUT	LUX	JPN	EUR	**2**	**10th**
1997	Tyrrell	Ford V8	**G**	Jos Verstappen	Ret	15	Ret	10	8	11	Ret	Ret	Ret	10	Ret	Ret	Ret	12	Ret	13	16	**2**	**10th**
1997	Tyrrell	Ford V8	**G**	Mika Salo	Ret	13	8	9	5	Ret	Ret	Ret	Ret	Ret	13	11	Ret	Ret	10	Ret	12	**2**	**10th**
