= Ichikoh =

Japanese auto parts manufacturer

Ichikoh Industries, Ltd.
- Trade name: Ichikoh
- Native name: 市光工業株式会社
- Romanized name: Ichikō Kōgyō Kabushiki gaisha
- Type: Kabushiki gaisha
- Industry: Automotive
- Founded: June 20, 1903; 123 years ago
- Headquarters: Isehara, Kanagawa, Japan
- Key people: Haiko Sawa (President and CEO)
- Brands: PIAA
- Revenue: ¥113,859 million (2017)
- Operating income: ¥2,469 billion (2017)
- Net income: ¥2,856 million (2017)
- Total assets: ¥109,634 million (2017)
- Parent: Valeo
- Website: www.ichikoh.com

Ichikoh Industries, Ltd. (市光工業株式会社; Ichikō Kōgyō Kabushiki-gaisha) is a Japanese automotive parts manufacturer which mainly produces automotive lights and mirrors. As an original equipment manufacturer, it competes with Stanley Electric and Koito Manufacturing.

== History ==
Ichikoh resulted from the 1967 partnership and 1968 merger of two companies: Hakkosha Co., Ltd. (株式会社白光舎; Kabushiki-gaisha Hakkōsha), founded in June 1903 as a manufacturer of signal lamps, and Ichikawa Manufacturing (市川製作所; Ichikawa Seisakusho), founded in April 1916 as an auto parts manufacturer. In 1987, the company launched an American branch, Ichikoh Manufacturing, Inc. (IMI), in Kentucky, which was liquidated in 2007.

In 2000, Ichikoh entered a partnership with French auto parts maker Valeo, with a plant in Foshan, China opening in 2006 as a joint venture between the two companies.

Ichikoh became a subsidiary of Valeo in 2017, and its mirror manufacturing operations were spun off in 2023.
