= Neocolours =

Filipino vocal group

NeoColours
- Origin: Manila, Philippines
- Genre: Pop rock
- Years active: 1987–1994, 1999–2001, 2018–present
- Label: Vicor Universal Records
- Members: Jimmy Antiporda; Ito Rapadas; Marvin Querido; Niño Regalado; Paku Herrera; Josel Jimenez
- Past members: Jack Rufo; Dan Gil
- Website: https://www.facebook.com/neocolours http://www.instagram.com/neocolours_official http://www.youtube.com/neocolours

Neocolours is a Filipino pop-rock band formed in February 1987, out of the remnants of a mid-1980s vocal group (WaterColors), in Manila, Philippines. Founding members are Ito Rapadas (vocals), Jimmy Antiporda (keyboards/vocals), Marvin Querido (keyboards), Josel Jimenez (guitar), Paku Herrera (bass) and Nino Regalado (drums). Their first album, Making It in 1988 reached platinum sales, and helped usher in a new era in the Philippine recording industry that is now known as the early 1990s band explosion.

The second album Tuloy Pa Rin was released in 1990, and created more hit singles for the band. It similarly reached platinum status and cemented several tracks as classic "OPM" songs to this day. The band, however, reached a plateau with the relatively poor sales of the third album Truth and Consequence in 1992. Various founding members made their exit in 1991 and 1992. Josel Jimenez was the first one to leave in 1991 and returned to his hometown of Davao. Jack Rufo replaced him. Marvin Querido similarly decided to leave in 1992, and pursued a career as a session keyboardist and musical arranger. With the varying interests of the members and a dip in public interest in the band, the remaining members agreed to retire the name in 1994.

Encouraged once more by a resurgent interest from its fans, the band decided in 1999 to do a "re-recording" of old hits from the past albums and compile those into a rehashed package. Additional bonus songs were especially produced for the one of which, "Kasalanan Ko Ba", became a radio hit. The resultant album, entitled Emerge: The Best of Neocolours, reached double platinum sales in the Philippines.

Neocolours' songs have been covered repeatedly by various artists through the years, which contributed to the band's stature as a relevant 1980s/'90s pop act. Their songs were utilized in various commercials, film and television show themes.

== Current undertakings ==
Keyboardist Jimmy Antiporda heads his own company JAM Creations Corporation, a company involved in music production for television and radio commercials, album recordings and events. Jimmy has also composed top-charting songs for different artists; "Makita Kang Muli" (Sugarfree); "Mga Kababayan Ko", "Cold Summer Nites" and "Man From Manila" (Francis Magalona); "Just Love Ngayong Pasko" (various ABS-CBN talents). He also composed and arranged for television news and current/public affairs shows including: TV Patrol (ABS-CBN News and Current Affairs); 24 Oras and Unang Hirit (GMA Integrated News and Public Affairs); and Aksyon (News5).

Lead vocalist Ito Rapadas, who is also a songwriter, is the Original Pilipino Music (OPM) production department managing director for Universal Records. Rapadas has produced and overseen important album works for the past years at Universal Records. His latest works are as follows: the chart topping and quadruple platinum APO Hiking Society tribute album Kami Napo Muna, Lani Misalucha's 2006 gold record album and the best selling and gold record light jazz album of 2007 - In Love with Bacharach.

Meanwhile, guitarist Jack Rufo had emerged as one of the Philippine industry's most sought after pop-rock producers and session guitarists. His original piece "aratig" is one of the best guitar exhibitions in the Philippines. His most outstanding work was for Kitchie Nadal's multi-platinum selling second album in 2004. He has since collaborated and produced pop-rock albums and songs by Janella Salvador, Daniel Padilla, Jericho Rosales, Kyla, Barbie Almabis, Yeng Constantino, Rocksteddy and Rivermaya. He continues to arrange, compose and produce top selling tracts and singles in the music industry. He left the group in July 2019.

Niño Regalado is widely recognized as one of the Philippines' most able session drummers. He continues to play for top singers and regularly plays for popular variety TV shows. He is also a producer, composer and music arranger.

Paku Herrera manages his own business in Manila and remains active with his music career as a session bass player.

Josel Jimenez stayed out of music related activities, but recently returned once more to band music with a group he formed in Davao City.

Marvin Querido is an A-listed musical director, arranger & keyboardist. He is sought after by many recording artists such as Gary Velanciano, Lani Misalucha, Sarah Geronimo and Piolo Pascual. He is currently the owner of his own recording studio, OnQ, and he is in-demand by famous artists and singer such as Martin Nievera, Anne Curtis, Angeline Quinto, and Lea Salonga. His arrangements are highly acclaimed by both locally and internationally.

== Discography ==
=== Studio albums ===
- Making It (1988) (formats: vinyl, CD, cassette)
- Tuloy Pa Rin (1990) (formats: CD, cassette)
- Truth & Consequence (1992) (formats: CD, cassette)
- Emerge: The Best of Neocolours (1999) (formats: LP record, CD, cassette)

=== Compilation albums ===
- Rediscovered (2004)

=== Singles ===
- "Bahala Na Kaya"
- "Here I Am Again"
- "Hold On"
- "Maybe"
- "Tuloy Pa Rin"
- "Say You'll Never Go"
- "Kasalanan Ko Ba"
- "Sandali Lang"
- "Makita Kang Muli" (Original by Sugarfree & original composed by Jimmy Antiporda & was also featured on MYX Live in 2012)

== Members ==
- Jimmy Antiporda - keyboards & vocals
- Ito Rapadas - lead vocals
- Marvin Querido - keyboards, backing vocals
- Niño Regalado - drums, backing vocals
- Paku Herrera - bass, backing vocals
- Josel Jimenez - guitar, backing vocals

== Awards ==
Year	Award giving body	Category	Nominated work	Results
2000	Awit Awards	Best Produced Record of the Year	"Kasalanan Ko Ba"	Won
