= Live+ =

Brand of energy drink

Live+ is an energy drink marketed to New Zealanders by Monster Beverage Corporation. It was originally known as Lift+ or Lift Plus and was created and produced by Coca-Cola Amatil based on the soft drink Lift.

== History ==
The brand, originally known as Lift Plus was which was introduced to New Zealand in 1999. The brand over the years has seen an extensive marketing campaign, especially on the television show Pulp Sport. The slogan for Lift Plus was "Sharpen Up!" until mid-2011 when the new Lift Plus Extra Strength was launched and the slogan was changed to "wake up your buds" and "choose your level". The choose your level slogan refers to the fact that Lift Plus Extra Strength has 32 mg/100 mL of caffeine when the Original Lift Plus has 14 mg/100 mL.

In 2011, Coca-Cola Amatil claimed that Lift Plus and the Mother energy drink had a combined share of 20 per cent the New Zealand energy drink market or 3.7 per cent of the non-alcoholic ready-to-drink market.

In 2018, the name changed from Lift+ to Live+ and ownership was transferred from Coca-Cola Amatil to Monster Beverage Corporation.

The drink was also available in Australia from 1999 to 2003, leaving many Australians disappointed with its replacement “Recharge by Sprite” which was short lived.

== Varieties ==
LIVE+ Original Citrus

The original drink in the range, previously known as Lift Plus Original and LIVE+ Persist

LIVE+ Zero Sugar

formerly known as Lift Plus Sugarfree, Lift Plus Zero and LIVE+ Ascend

LIVE+ Tart Apple

formerly known as Lift+ Green and Live+ Ignite

LIVE+ Watermelon A new flavour entered the market in April 2022

Lift Plus Extra Strength

A discontinued Extra Strength version of the original Lift Plus drink.

== See also ==
- List of energy drinks
