= Gorilla Energy =

Russian energy drink brand

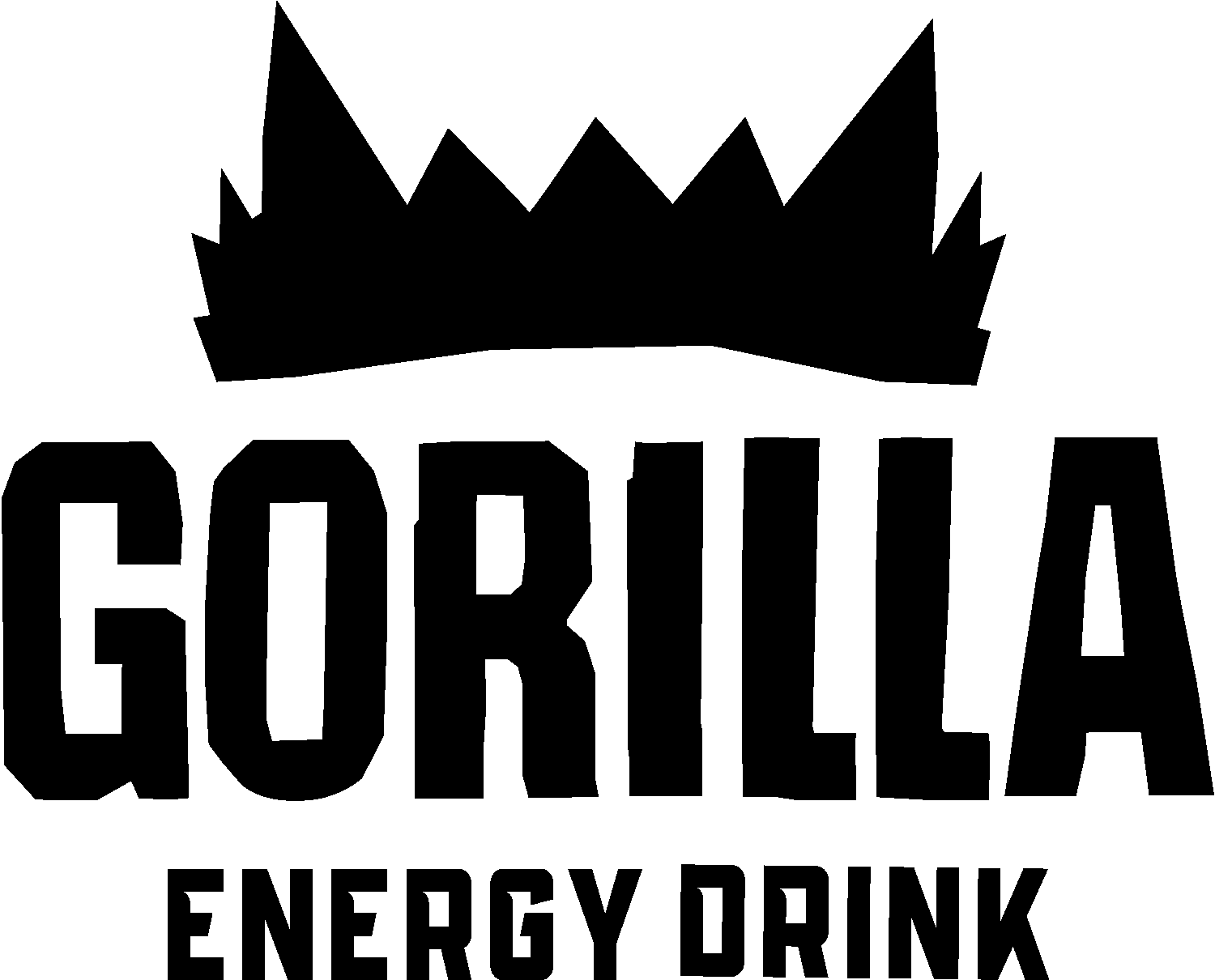
- Type: Energy drink
- Introduced: 2010
- Website: gorillaenergy.com

Gorilla Energy is a global energy drink brand Co-founded by Gleb Lifschitz and Misha Lifschitz, and headquartered in Los Angeles and Dubai. Production began in 2010, with products now distributed across 30 countries, and the brand selling almost 1 billion cans in 2024.

== History ==
Founded in New York City in 2008, and now headquartered in Los Angeles and Dubai, Gorilla Energy is distributed in 30 countries globally, across regions including North America, Asia and the Middle East. In 2024 the company sold almost 1 billion cans.

In 2025, Gorilla Energy appointed Ahmed Elafifi, formerly of Coca Cola, to be its CEO, and Oliver Holzmann, formerly of Red Bull, as its CMO.

== Variants ==
Gorilla Energy comes in multiple variants, including Original, Ultimate, Mango Coconut, Green Boost, Kiwi Strawberry, Cherry Berry, Dragon Fruit Pineapple, Bubble Gum, and Berry Blast.

== See also ==
- List of energy drinks
- Caffeine
