= Revo (drink) =

Ukrainian drink brand

Revō is a Ukrainian drink brand. It is an energy drink with vitamins and extracts of guarana and damiana and natural juice. There is a soft drink version, Revō Energy, and an alcoholic (low alcohol) version, Revō Alco Energy.

The drink was launched on the Ukrainian market in 2007 by New Products Group. The drink is produced under license and supervision of Red & Blue Beverages, an American company.

Revō Energy is sold in aluminum .25-liter cans (not available anymore) and Revō Alco Energy in half-liter cans (formerly in .33-liter cans). Other variations have been produced such as Revō Angel and Revōlver.

Revo energy drink

== See also ==
- List of energy drinks
