= Reign (drink) =

American energy drink brand

- Type: Liquid food supplement
- Manufacturer: Monster Beverage Corporation
- Origin: United States
- Introduced: 2019; 7 years ago
- Website: reignbodyfuel.com/en/

Reign Total Body Fuel is an American energy drink that was introduced in 2019 by the Monster Beverage Corporation. It is available in 16 flavors. Its markets are North America, South America and Europe.

== History ==
In 2019, VPX Sports filed a lawsuit against Monster Beverage for infringing on their trademark. In 2021, Monster won the trade dress lawsuit.

In 2020, Monster Beverage request to block VPX Sports from using the word Reign was preliminarily granted.

In 2021, the talent agency Viral Nation partnered with Reign, along with other brands, for Anthony Hamilton Jr. Former professional wrestler Eva Marie is also an ambassador of the brand.

In 2022, rugby union club Harlequin F.C. announced a partnership with Reign. In September 2023, it was announced that Reign Storm is the official energy drink of Association of Pickleball Players.

In 2024, Reign became the official energy drinks partner of Chelsea F.C. Women.
