= PIAA Corporation =

Japanese automobile parts company

- Trade name: PIAA
- Native name: PIAA株式会社
- Romanized name: PIAA kabushiki gaisha
- Type: Kabushiki gaisha
- Industry: Automotive
- Founded: July 1, 1963; 63 years ago
- Headquarters: Suidō, Bunkyō, Tokyo, Japan
- Key people: Hiroyasu Terada (President)
- Revenue: ¥475 million (2019)
- Net income: ¥157.02 million (2019)
- Total assets: ¥5,755,357,000 (2019)
- Owner: Valeo
- Number of employees: 166
- Parent: Ichikoh
- Divisions: PIAA USA
- Website: www.piaa.co.jp/english

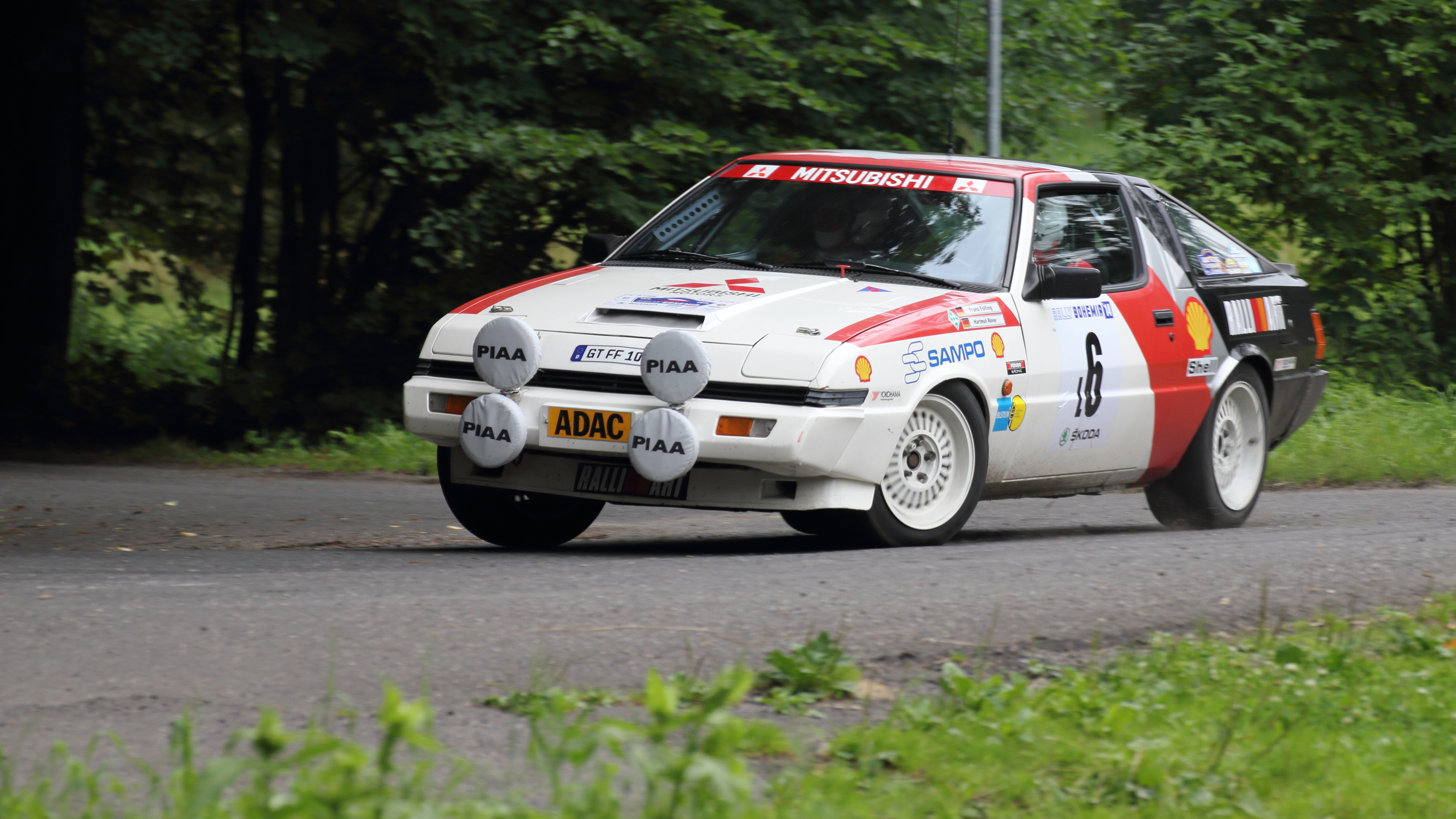
Mitsubishi Starion 2000 Turbo rally car with PIAA lights

PIAA Corporation (PIAA株式会社; PIAA Kabushiki gaisha) is an automobile parts and supplies manufacturer headquartered in Bunkyō, Tokyo, Japan. It is a consolidated subsidiary of Ichikoh, which in turn is a subsidiary of Valeo.

Despite the capitalization of its name implying that it is an acronym, it was stated in 2015 and 2019 to actually be onomatopoeia.

== History ==
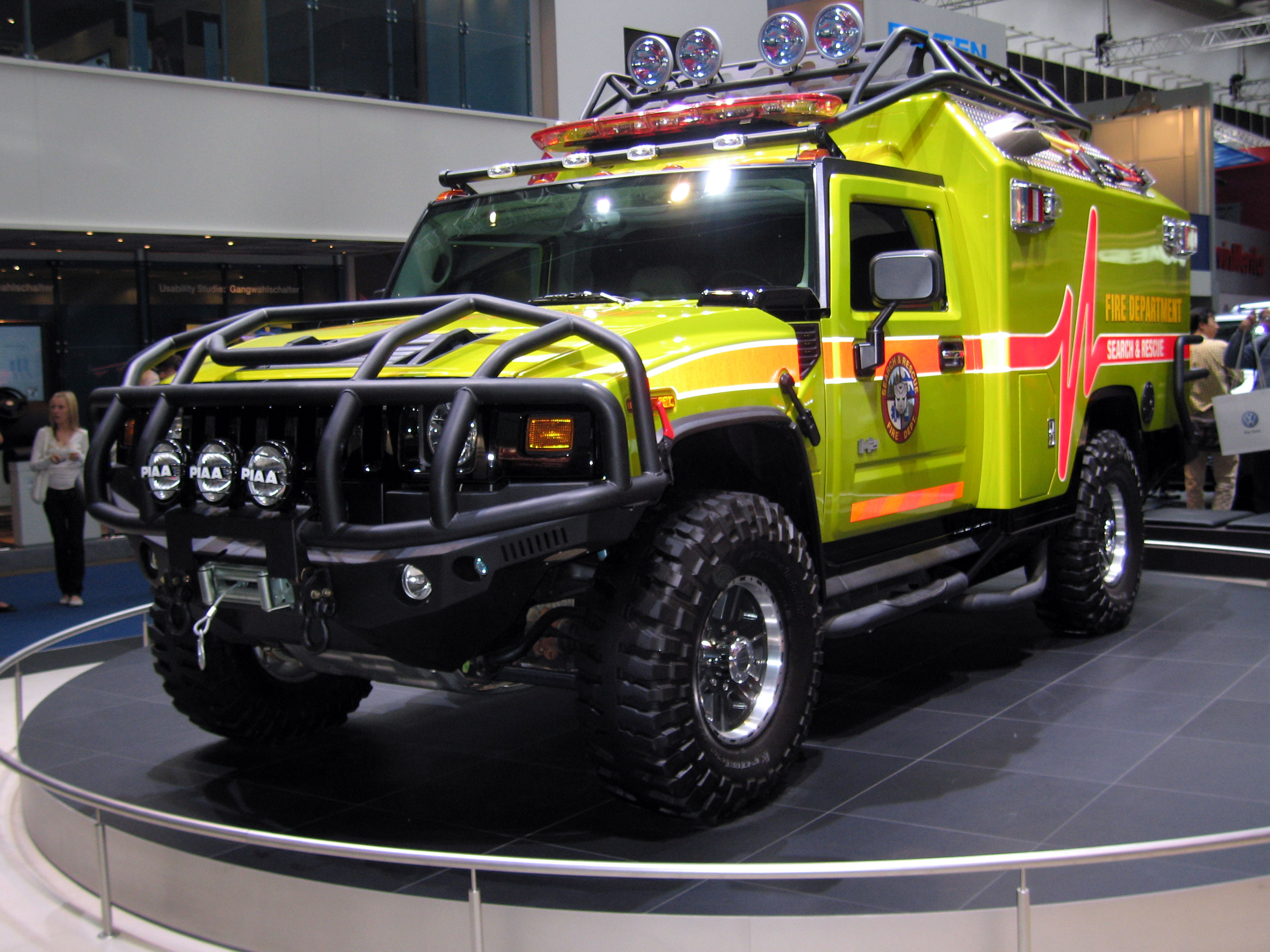
"Ratchet" movie car from Transformers featuring PIAA lights

- 1963 - Ichikoh Industries Co., Ltd.'s general repair parts sales department is separated and independent as Eva Ace Co., Ltd.
- 1980 - Started product development under the PIAA brand.
- 1981 - Sold door mirrors and became a hit product.
- 1982 - Participated in the World Rally Championship and RAC Rally with ADVAN-PIAA Rally Team racing a Lancer Turbo.
- 1983 - Launched the car carrier brand Terzo.
- 1984 - Changed trade name to PIAA Corporation .
- 1986 - Started supporting racing driver Satoru Nakajima .
- 1987 - Started selling high-performance aluminum wheels using the world's highest forging method.
- 1989 - Head office moved to Jingumae, Shibuya.
- 1991 - Toyota Celica, who supplied lamps at the Safari Rally, won the overall victory.
- 1999 - Released the world's first water-repellent silicone wiper.
- 2004 - Entered the motorcycle industry and started supporting the Suzuka 8 Hours Endurance Road Race .
- 2011 - Changed trade name to PIAA Co., Ltd. Moved the head office to Suido, Bunkyo Ward. Became a wholly owned subsidiary of Ichikoh Industries, Ltd. Partnership with Valeo, a major French auto parts manufacturer.
- 2017 - Concluded an official technical partner contract with Toyota Gazoo Racing World Rally Team. Ichikoh Industries became a member of the Valeo Group as a result of becoming an affiliate of Valeo Bayen, and the corporate logo was partially changed.
- 2018 - Provided lighting for the movie Over Drive as production cooperation.

== Products ==
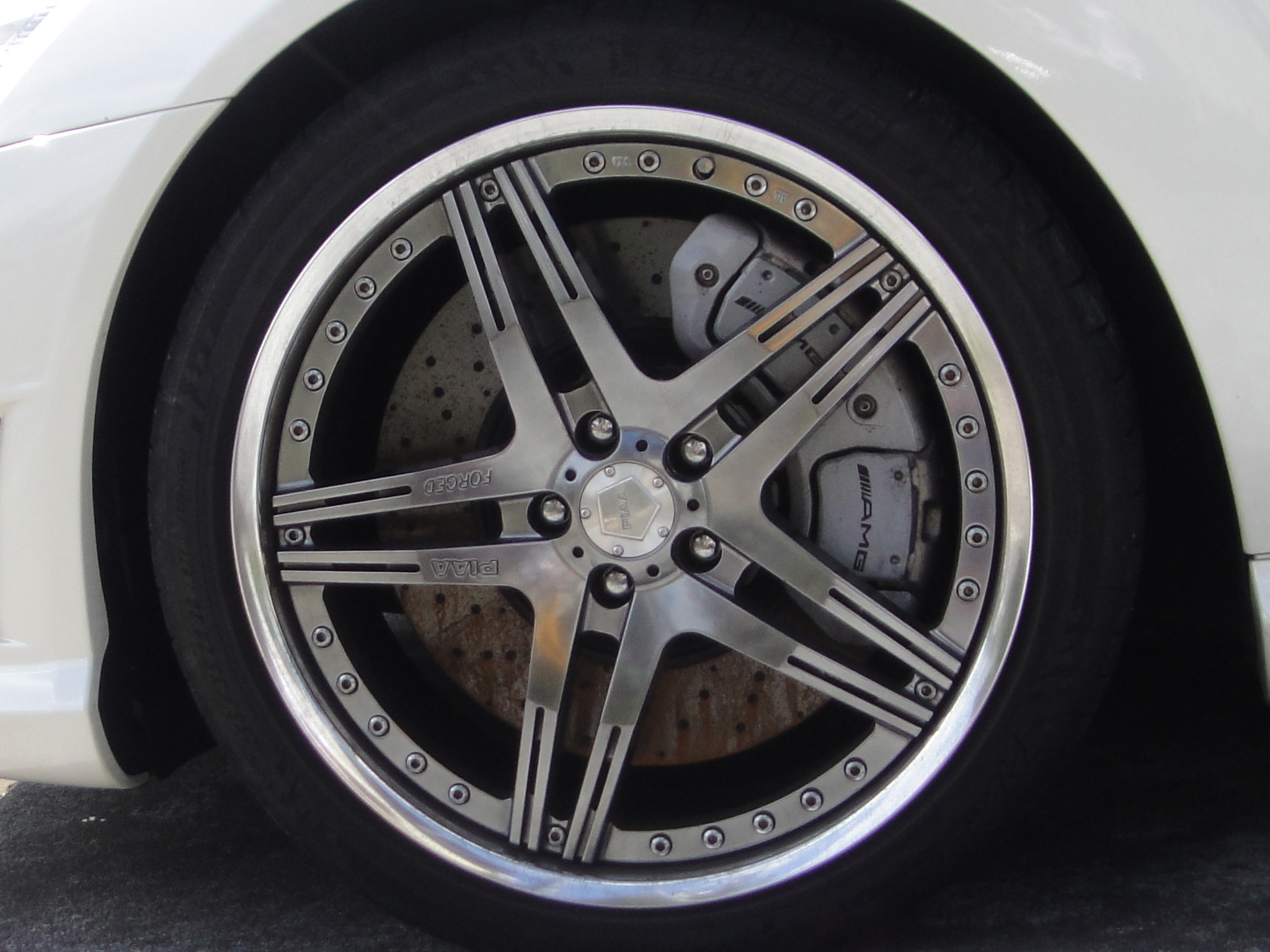
PIAA forged aluminum wheel on a Mercedes S65 AMG

Current Product Lines

- Light Bulb (HID, LED, Halogen, Incandescent )
- Wiper
- Carrier roof box
- Cooler
- Forged Alloy Wheel
- Filters (oil, air, air conditioner, etc.)
- Radiator valve
- Horn
- Repair parts (clutches, starters/alternators, air conditioner parts, lamps, etc.)

== Motorsports ==
PIAA is active in supporting motorsports. It started by supplying lamps to rally teams in 1982. After that, its customer base gradually expanded, and currently, in addition to racing cars such as rally and touring cars (such as in the Nürburgring 24 Hours, Spa 24 Hours, and Fuji 24 Hours), the company also supplies racing motorcycles (such as in the Suzuka 8 Hours and FIM Endurance World Championship). Due to the high quality of its products, many teams use not only its lamps but also its water-repellent wipers, aluminum wheels, etc. for both cars and motorcycles in Japan and overseas.

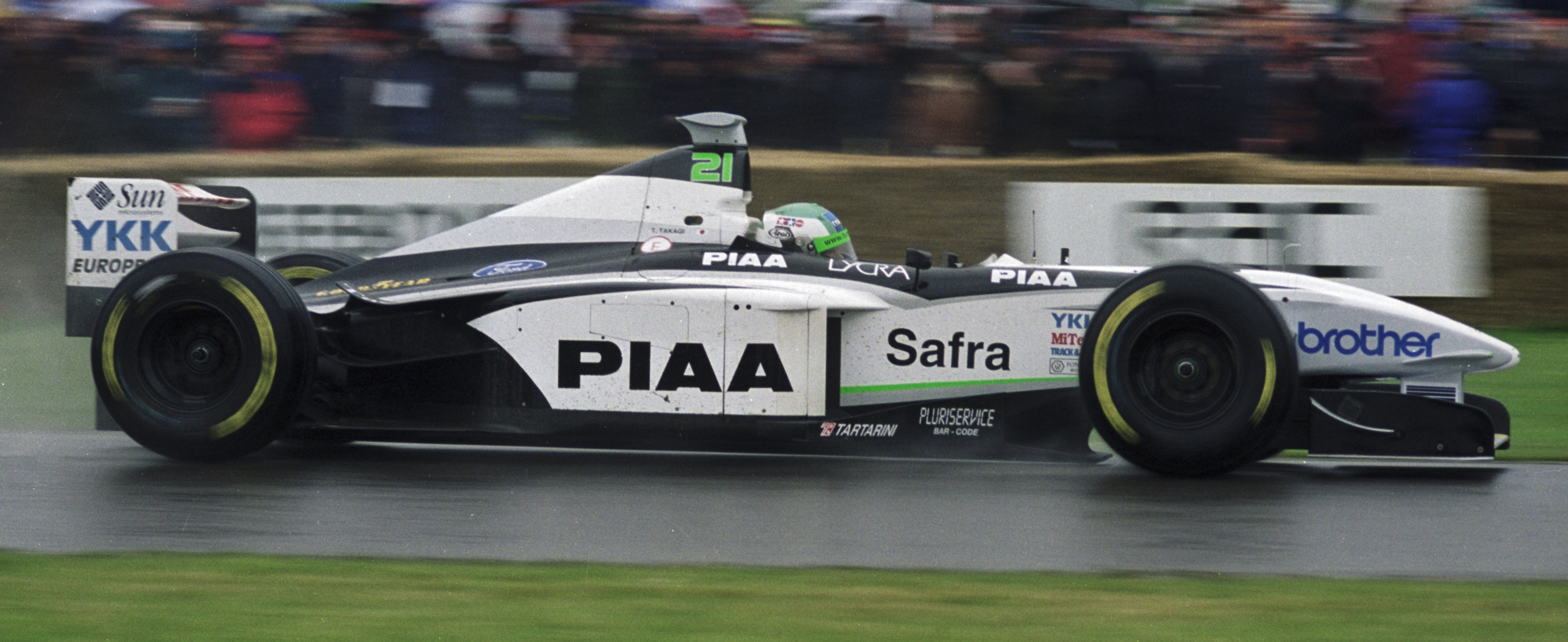
Tyrrell 026 Formula One race car with PIAA livery

PIAA was the title sponsor in Formula One of the Tyrrell Racing Organisation's entrants for the 1997 and 1998 seasons. The PIAA sponsorship livery was displayed on the Tyrrell 025 driven by Mika Salo and Jos Verstappen, and on the Tyrrell 026 driven by Ricardo Rosset and Toranosuke Takagi. This helped increase international awareness of the PIAA brand. PIAA had earlier been a minor sponsor of the Tyrrell team during the 1990 and 1991 seasons on the Tyrrell 019 and 020, respectively.

Support for former racing driver Satoru Nakajima has been deeply connected since 1986. At the 1991 Japanese Grand Prix, which was Nakajima's last race at Suzuka, the Hinomaru support flag of "Thank you Satoru Nakajima" was developed. Even after he retired from active racing, PIAA continued to sponsor his Nakajima Racing team. It withdrew from sponsorship in 2009, but resumed support in 2012.

In the WRC, Toyota, Hyundai, and Citroën are supplied with PIAA lamps (and, for the former, water-repellent wipers).
