= NRG Energy Drink =

Energy drink trademark

NRG
- Product type: Energy drink
- Current owner: Energy 2000
- Country: Austria
- Introduced: 1996; 30 years ago
- Discontinued: 2008; 18 years ago

NRG Energy Drink was the brand of energy drinks created in 1997 in Austria.

== History ==
NRG was a Guarana enhanced energy drink originally from Austria of green color introduced in 1996. It was discontinued in 2008. Drink was distributed in 8.4 fl. oz. cans

== Varieties ==
- Full power drink
- Tyrrell formula
- T-Minus F1 Accelerator
- Tutti-frutti
- Guaraná NRG vodka

== Contents ==
Ingredients
carbonated water
sugar
guarana extract
magnesium
vitamin B 2,5,6
vItamin C
citric acid
natural & artificial flavor
color blue 5
yellow 2 Warning
caffeine
taurine

== Sponsorship ==
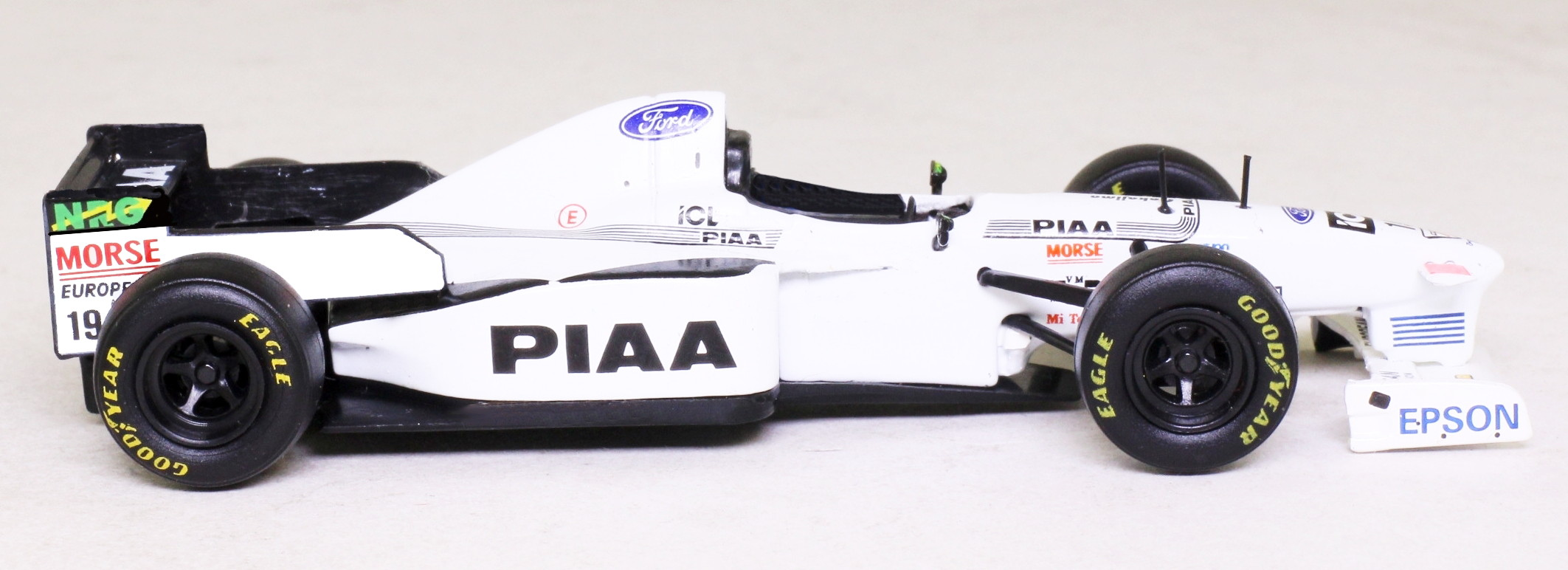
Tyrrell 025 Formula 1 car with NRG sponzorship

Energy drink was sponsor of Formula 1 team Tyrrell in 1997 and team Arrows in 1998 as T-Minus F1 Accelerator variant. The name NRG was visible on the top of the rear wing panels. It was produced version of Tyrrell designed cans of NGR energy.
