= Beaver Buzz =

Canadian energy drink brand

- Type: energy drink
- Manufacturer: Double D Beverage Co. (DBA DD Beverage & Nutrition)
- Introduced: mid-2005; 20 years ago
- Colour: various
- Flavour: various
- Related products: Bear 'n Beaver Premium Craft Soda, Iron Kingdom Sports Nutrition, Grizzly Supplements, DD Beverage Co.
- Website: beaverbuzz.com

Beaver Buzz is an energy drink line produced in Canada Double D Beverage Co. (DBA DD Beverage & Nutrition) of British Columbia, under the brand of Canadian Beaver Buzz Energy. The beverages include taurine, caffeine, Siberian Ginseng, Guarana seed extract and various vitamins, and uses cane sugar instead of commonly used high fructose corn syrup. Product variations include Citrus, Green tea, Saskatoon berry, Root Beer, Black Currant, Original, Pineapple Mango, and Canadian Punch flavours. Beaver Buzz contains 180 mg caffeine in a standard 473 ml can.

The beverage is distributed by retailers in all regions of Canada and was noted in national and regional press coverage. In early 2009, the company introduced Beaver Natural Soda', a line of microbrewed non-energy soft drinks based on all natural ingredients. Double D Beverage has now rebranded the line to Bear 'n Beaver Premium Craft Soda The Buzz Energy brands also traded in the United Kingdom as Bulldog Buzz, and in 2008 was selected as the official energy drink of the Batley Bulldogs team selected.

== Flavours ==
- Saskatoon Berry – blue can
- Citrus – red can
- Root Beer – brown can
- Green Tea – light green can
- Black Currant – purple can
- Original – black can
- Canadian Punch – white can (sugar free)
- Pineapple Mango – white and red can (sugar free)
- Dr buzz – burgundy and tan can
