= Resource Location and Discovery Framing =

Resource Location and Discovery (RELOAD) is a peer-to-peer (P2P) signalling protocol for use on the Internet. A P2P signalling protocol provides its clients with an abstract storage and messaging service between a set of cooperating peers that form the overlay network. RELOAD is designed to support a peer-to-peer SIP network, but can be utilized by other applications with similar requirements by defining new usages that specify the kinds of data that must be stored for a particular application. RELOAD defines a security model based on a certificate enrollment service that provides unique identities. NAT traversal is a fundamental service of the protocol. RELOAD also allows access from "client" nodes that do not need to route traffic or store data for others.
