= Bomb Energy Drink =

Canadian brand of energy drink

- Type: Energy drink
- Country of origin: Canada
- Introduced: 2009; 16 years ago
- Website: www.drinkbomb.com

Bomb is an energy drink created in 2009 in Hamilton, Ontario. It began as a BIB (Bag-In-Box) product for use by restaurants, bars, nightclubs, stadiums and arenas. In 2013, Bomb Energy Drink became available in a 250 mL can in convenience and grocery stores and gas stations across Canada. On the company's website, there is a partial list of where the beverage can be purchased. The company went bankrupt in 2022.

== History ==
Founded in 2009, Bomb Energy Drink separates itself from the competition with its unique Bag-In-Box format. This unique availability, coupled with its tart citrusy taste and value pricing had allowed it to rapidly expand its share of the Canadian market. Popularity of the beverage was furthered increased by their appearance on the Canadian edition of Dragons' Den in January 2013. The pitch was unsuccessful.

On January 28, 2015, Bomb Energy Drink was featured in an update segment on Dragons’ Den. One year after their initial appearance on the show, sales of Bomb Energy more than tripled, making Bomb the fastest growing energy drink in Canada. Unfortunately the hype went away as fast as it came and the company ceased production.
