= Emerge: The Best of Neocolours =

Studio album by Neocolours
- Released: August 1999
- Genre: OPM
- Label: Universal Records

Neocolours chronology
Tuloy Pa Rin (1995)	Emerge: The Best of Neocolours (1999)

Emerge: The Best of Neocolours is the fourth album by Neocolours, released by Universal Records since Ito Rapadas was now a label manager of the music company originally from Vicor Music Corp. The album consists of the best hits and singles that the band produced for the Filipino audience. It has reached double platinum sales which confirms the band's low key support in the "adult contemporary" genre. Most of these songs were rendered by new artists such as Shamrock, Metafour, Erik Santos, King, Aaron Agassi and Mark Bautista. Three of the cuts were new material for this release: "Kasalanan Ko Ba", "Here I Am Again" and "Sandali Lang".

Professional ratings
Review scores
Source	Rating
AllMusic	2.5/5 stars

== Track listing ==
No.	Title	Length
1.	"Tuloy Pa Rin"	5:38
2.	"Maybe"	5:06
3.	"Hold On"	4:32
4.	"Sandali Lang"	3:47
5.	"Kasalanan Ko Ba"	4:11
6.	"Say You'll Never Go"	5:16
7.	"Making It"	4:29
8.	"Bahala Na"	5:36
9.	"Can't Deny"	4:27
10.	"Here I Am Again"	3:44
