= Car mirror =

Car mirror may refer to:

- Rear-view mirror, a mirror in vehicles that allows the driver to see rearwards
- Side-view mirror, or wing mirror, a mirror on the exterior of vehicles
