= Liquid X =

Dutch energy drink brand

- Type: Energy drink
- Distributor: LIQUID X ENERGY DRINK LLC
- Origin: Netherlands
- Introduced: 2001
- Colour: Black, Green
- Related products: Mountain Dew AMP, Rockstar, Monster Energy
- Website: https://drinkliquidx.com/

Liquid X is a brand of energy drink originally developed in Amsterdam for the rave scene. Liquid X has a citrus taste that can be related to the taste of Mountain Dew AMP. Liquid X claims to be the only "euphoric" energy drink available, meaning that it has no caffeine. It utilizes hormones and herbal mixtures to create energy.

In 2021, Liquid X was no longer available in pure form and it is now sold online as a water additive. The new formula has caffeine added.

== Energy ingredients ==
- L-Taurine 1500 mg
- N-Acetyl L-Tyrosine (NAT) 650 mg
- L-Citrulline DL-Malate 2:1 250 mg
- L-Theanine 250 mg
- Caffeine Anhydrous 175 mg
- Inositol 80 mg
- Beet Root Juice Powder (Beta vulgaris) 50 mg
- Damiana (Turnera Aphrodisiaca) (leaf) 40 mg
- Red Panax Ginseng 25 mg
- Hordenine 20 mg
- Acai Berry Juice Powder (Euterpe oleracea)(fruit) 10 mg
- Acetyl L-Carnitine HCl 10 mg
- Blueberry Powder 10 mg
- Grape Seed Extract (Vitis vinifera) (std for 95% proanthocyanidins) 10 mg
- Holy Basil (leaf) (Ocimum sanctum) 10 mg
- Kelp (Ascophyllum nodosum) (whole thallus) 10 mg
- Mucuna Pruriens Extract (98% L-Dopa) 10 mg
- Organic Spirullina (Athrospira platensis) (plant)10 mg
- Pomegranate Extract (Punica granatum)(peel)(Standardized to contain 40% Ellagic Acid) 10 mg
- Purple Sweet Potato 10 mg
- Bioperine® (Black Pepper Fruit Extract) 5 mg
- Yohimbine HCl 2.5 mg
- Huperzine A 1% (Huperzia serrata Leaf Extract) 150 mcg
- Horny goat weed extract (also known as an epimedium plant) - 30 mg

== Flavors ==
- Original "Amped-Up" - Citrus (Sugar-Free)
- Blue Goo - Watermelon Slushy (Sugar-Free)
- Deepwine - Underdark Grape (Sugar-Free)
- Kamé Cocktail - Tropical Sunrise (Sugar-Free)
- Yuzu-maki - Yuzu Lemonade (Sugar-Free)
- Fat Dragon - Red Watermelon (Sugar-Free)
- "Devil" - Fruit Punch (Sugar-Free)
- DrinkLiquidX.com
