= Pussy (energy drink) =

Carbonated energy drink

Pussy (or amina)
- Type: Energy drink
- Manufacturer: Pussy Drinks Ltd
- Origin: United Kingdom
- Introduced: 2006
- Ingredients: Carbonated water, fruit juice, herbs
- Website: pussynaturalenergy.com

Pussy is a carbonated energy drink produced by Pussy Drinks Ltd in the UK. The drink and brand were created by Jonnie Shearer around Christmas 2004. In 2013, part of the advertising campaign for Pussy was banned in the UK by the Advertising Standards Authority for being sexually explicit.

== Ingredients ==
Pussy is made from carbonated water, sugar, grape juice, and a mixture of herbs and other fruit. Its caffeine content comes from guarana. Pussy is advertised as "100% natural" as it does not contain artificial additives.

== History ==
Shearer came up with the idea of a natural energy drink after leaving university in 2004. Inspired by the Virgin brand name of Virgin Group, Shearer decided to name his drink Pussy.

Shearer launched the company in 2006, and started marketing Pussy in 2007. Initially Shearer ran the company from his bedroom, and delivered the drinks to clubs and bars himself. By the summer of 2011 Pussy was sold in 3000 shops in the UK, including Tesco and Selfridges, and exported to 18 countries, with sales of up to 200,000 cans per month. By April 2012, Pussy sales had increased to 500,000 a month.

As of 2024, the company has two employees.

== Advertising ==
In the winter of 2012, Pussy Drinks Ltd started a UK advertising campaign with two styles of posters used on billboards and trailers. The first advert features the word "Pussy" in large lower-case letters above the phrase "The drink's pure, it's your mind that's the problem." with a picture of a can to the right. The second advert featured the word "Outrageous." in large letters above the phrase "An energy drink that actually tastes good." with a picture of a can to the left.

The ASA received 156 complaints about the posters of which six issues were considered. The ASA accepted that people would see the word pussy as a slang term for vagina. The ASA suggested that Pussy Drinks Ltd were aware of the double meaning and played upon it in the first poster, referring to secondary meaning which was not "pure" and was a "problem". As such the poster was deemed sexually explicit and offensive. The ASA also ruled that older children would be aware of the double meaning, the poster was unsuitable to be placed where children might see it. Similar complaints about the second poster were disallowed, as were complaints that the first poster was offensive to religious people. Two of the issues were upheld, and the ASA banned the first poster.

In response, Pussy Drinks Ltd questioned why people would assume a vulgar meaning of the word "pussy" and asked if it was offensive that the ancient Egyptians worshipped cats. Richard Branson compared the ASA's banning of one Pussy advert to the banning of the Sex Pistols in the 1970s, saying that the ban would increase brand exposure and sales, a process known as the Streisand effect.

Since 2009, Pussy has been endorsed by two-time World Superbike champion Troy Corser, who sometimes promotes the drink on his headgear.

== See also ==
- Fucking Hell, a German beer that caused similar controversy
