= John Malloy =

American contemporary artist, illustrator and author

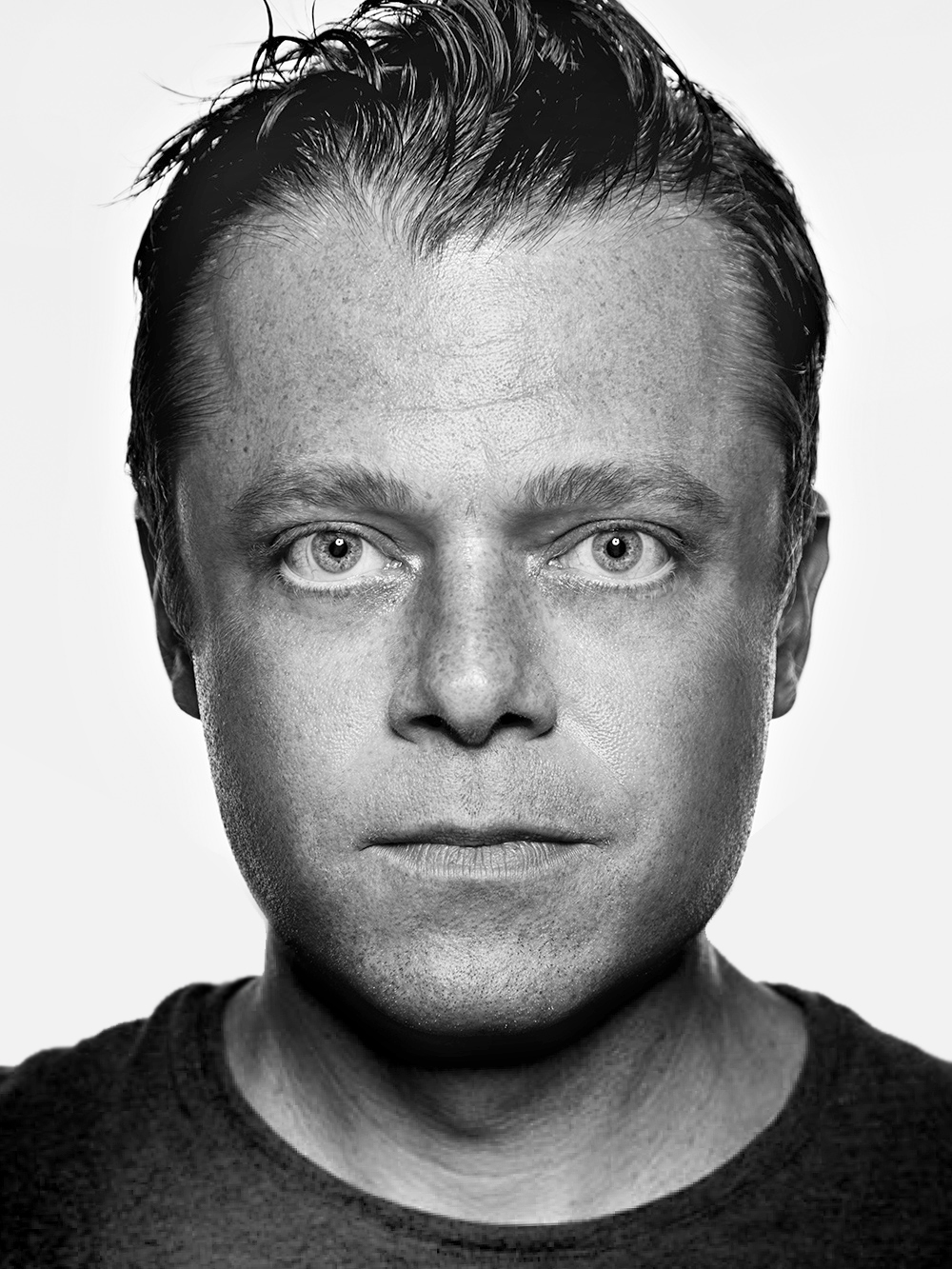
- Malloy in 2024
- Style: Contemporary
- Website: fluxartist.com

John Malloy, known professionally as FLuX, is an American contemporary artist and author.

FLuX's artwork has been exhibited internationally and is included in collections that also feature works by artists such as Andy Warhol and Jeff Koons. He coined the term 'Trompe Nouveau' to describe his artwork, which combines hyper-realistic oil painting with decorative elements of Art Nouveau.

His first graphic novel, Amnesia, is one of the earliest stories to introduce the multiverse concept. His second graphic novel, Good: From the Amazon Jungle to Suburbia and Back, was released by NBM Publishing in 2024. He fully illustrated and co-authored the book with David Good, the son of American anthropologist Kenneth Good and Yanomami mother, Yarima. The book chronicles David's mother's story growing up in the Amazon and David's coming-of-age tale and reunion with her in the jungle.
