= Emerge Stimulation Drink =

UK energy drink

The original (250ml) can of Emerge Stimulation Drink

Emerge is a carbonated mixed-fruit flavour energy drink from the United Kingdom which contains taurine and caffeine. It is produced by the Cott Corporation at their packaging facility at Kegworth in Leicestershire. It is sold in Sainsburys, Asda, Poundland, Home Bargains and other retailers, usually newsagents. Its primary difference from competing brand-name energy drinks such as Red Bull and Relentless is the comparatively lower RRP of between 59p and 75p (250ml can). It can often be found at a lower price than this, for example in pound shops or more recently, for loyalty card prices.

The brand is the sixth largest in the UK, after Lucozade, Red Bull, Monster, Relentless and Rockstar.

In 2014, 15.1 million litres of the drink was produced, an increase of 24.3% on the previous year.

== Ingredients ==
Listed below is the ingredients for the regular version:

- Carbonated water
- Sugar
- Sweets
- Citric acid
- Taurine (0.3%)
- Glucuronolactone (0.24%) (Not in the 1-litre bottle)
- Flavouring (including caffeine (0.03%))
- Acidity regulator (sodium citrates)
- Inositol
- Colours (sulfite, ammonia caramel, carmoisine)
- Vitamins (niacin, B_{5}, B_{6}, B_{2}, B_{12})
- Preservative (sodium benzoate)

Not recommended for people who may be sensitive to caffeine, or for pregnant women or children.

All versions of Emerge are suitable for vegetarians and vegans.

Available in 250 and 330 ml cans, 500 ml and 1 l plastic bottles. Also non sparkling, isotonic drinks in two flavours (orange and mixed berry) available in 500 ml plastic bottles.

== Flavours ==
Two new flavours of Emerge were released in 2011, the Mixed Berry flavour and the Tropical flavour. Listed below are the flavours: In 2021 more flavours were added including Zero White and Impact.

Flavour	Can	Price
Original	Red and silver	59p
Original light	Silver and red	59p
Tropical	Orange and silver	59p
Mixed Berry	Purple and silver	59p
Citrus	Green and silver	59p
Zero White	White and silver	59p
Impact	Red and black	59p

== Sponsorship ==
Emerge sponsored NME's 2011 Emerge Radar 2011 Tour.
