= Reload (drink) =

Energy drink

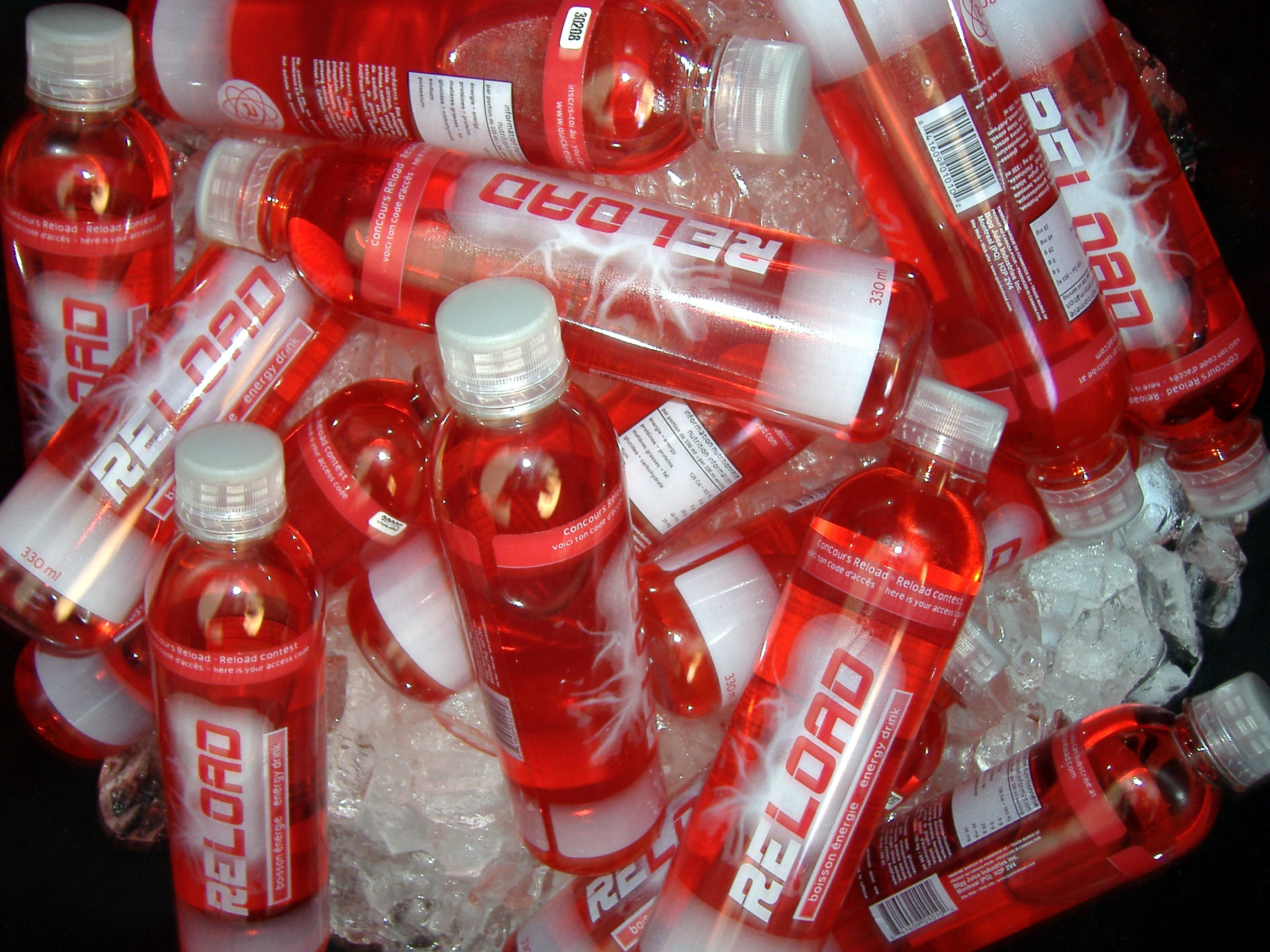
Reload in ice

Reload (stylized as RELOAD) is an energy drink that was launched in Montreal, Quebec, Canada in 2003.

The bottle is red with a yellow-white drink. Reload contains 130 mg caffeine per 330ml.

The energy drink was launched by three young Canadian entrepreneurs Frederico Panetta, Vincent Langlois and Frédérik Chapleau. The business "success story" made the headlines, mainly because the company signed an agreement with Macs/Couche-Tard, one of the major Canadian retailers, replacing KMX energy drink, a beverage marketed and promoted by Coca-Cola. Therefore, this "David against Goliath" story made the headlines.

After Red Bull gained the Canadian market following regulation changes by the Natural Health Product Directorate, the main associate (Vincent Langlois) invested in R&D to develop a new generation of energy products called "energy strips". Vincent Langlois, through his company, signed a distribution deal with various retailers including Shoppers Drug Mart in Canada and Walmart in Quebec.

The Reload energy strips were awarded the best innovative new nutraceutical product in 2005 by an independent committee during a national trade show in Montreal. The launch also attracted media's attention.
