= Bang Energy =

American brand of energy drinks

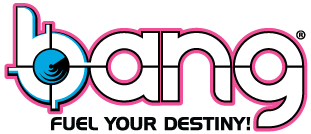
- The logo for Bang Energy, stylized in the Rainbow Unicorn flavor
- Product type: Energy drink
- Produced by: Vital Pharmaceuticals (2012–2023); Monster Beverage (2023–present)
- Country: United States
- Introduced: 2012; 14 years ago
- Tagline: Fuel Your Destiny!
- Website: bangenergy.com

Bang Energy is an American brand of energy drinks made by Vital Pharmaceuticals, a corporation located in Florida. In 2023, Bang was the third-highest-selling energy drink in the United States, behind Monster, and Red Bull.

On July 31, 2023, Monster Beverage acquired Vital Pharmaceuticals for $362 million. Including the Bang Energy brand and a beverage facility in Phoenix, Arizona, the deal came months after the company filed for Chapter 11 bankruptcy protection.

== History ==
Founded in 1993 by Jack Owoc, Bang's parent company manufactured and distributed sports supplements and performance beverages under the brand name VPX. Other products distributed by Vital included Redline, Noo Fuzion, and Meltdown.

In 2012, Vital created Bang, marketed as a low sugar carbonated energy drink and with the mission to make high-quality nutritional supplements backed by scientific research. In 2017, it was announced that Bang would offer a caffeine-free variant of the beverage, using beta-alanine in place of caffeine.

In 2019, the company opened a manufacturing and distribution facility in Phoenix, Arizona, which operates alongside their facility in Pembroke Pines, Florida.

In April 2020, PepsiCo entered into an exclusive distribution agreement with VPX to distribute Bang in the United States. On November 17, 2020, it gave PepsiCo a notice of termination; an emergency arbitrator ruled in December 2020 that Pepsi remained the exclusive distributor of Bang drinks until 2023. VPX resolved their disputes with PepsiCo and transitioned away from their distribution in June 2022.

In August 2022, it was reported that Keurig Dr Pepper was in talks to purchase VPX; these talks fell apart shortly after the reports surfaced.

On October 10, 2022, Bang's parent company filed for Chapter 11 bankruptcy protection. Three months after Owoc was removed and John DiDonato was named interim CEO of VPX, Monster Beverage reached an agreement for its purchase on June 28, 2023, this was completed one month later. Due to Monster's partnership and partial ownership by The Coca-Cola Company, Bang is now distributed through Coca-Cola's distribution network.

The Chapter 11 proceedings of Vital Pharmaceuticals, Inc. and six affiliated debtors (Case No. 22-17842 ) were filed in the United States Bankruptcy Court for the Southern District of Florida before Judge Peter D. Russin. Berger Singerman LLP, led by partner Jordi Guso, and Latham & Watkins LLP served as co-counsel to the debtors, with Rothschild & Co retained as investment banker and Huron Consulting Group as financial advisor. The proceedings attracted significant creditor participation, with firms such as Conrad & Scherer LLP, Pachulski Stang Ziehl & Jones LLP, Mark S. Roher, P.A. of South Florida, and Bast Amron LLP representing various creditor interests and stakeholders throughout the sale process and plan confirmation.

The brand's founder is a supporter of president Donald Trump, and has donated $250,000 to America First Action, a super PAC endorsed by Trump. Bang has been the subject of controversy for its attendance at Turning Point USA conferences, including a stunt in which the brand's marketers fired cash out of a "money cannon" towards the audience. The company also drew criticism for its response to the COVID-19 pandemic, ordering employees to attend a mandatory in-person meeting, a "dance party" promoting their Redline Noo-Fusion product, without proper social distancing or security protocols.

== Products ==
As of Feb 2026, Bang Energy has eleven flavors available:

- Black Cherry Vanilla
- Cotton Candy
- Delish Strawberry Kiss
- Purple Haze
- Radical Skadattle
- Any Means Orange
- Sour Ropes
- Star Blast
- Blue Razz
- Peach Mango
- Lime Pop Drop

Several other flavors were part of the brand's lineup, but were discontinued after the brand's acquisition by Monster Beverage. Alongside its mainline energy drink, Vital Pharmaceuticals produced several products under the Bang brand; after the company was purchased by Monster Beverage, all other products, including other VPX brands such as Redline, were phased out.

Former Bang Energy product lines included:

- Natural Bang, marketed as an all-natural alternative to mainline Bang.
- Bang Keto Coffee, a high protein coffee drink.
- Bang Shots, similar to that of 5 Hour Energy.
- Bang Pre-workout
- Bang Sweet Tea
- Bang ThermIQ, a liquid capsule dietary supplement marketed as a fat burner.
- Bang MIXX Hard Seltzer, an alcoholic drink under the Bang brand. Contains no caffeine.
- Vooz Hydration Sensation, marketed as a sports hydration drink.

On May 18th of 2026, Bang Energy released a limited time flavor, "American Berry", designed to celebrate America's 250th anniversary. This flavor is available through the end of 2026.

== Legal issues ==
Vital Pharmaceuticals was sued by competing energy drink manufacturer Monster Beverage, who alleged that Vital engaged in consumer deception and anti-competitive business practices. Vital countersued, alleging that Monster infringed their copyright by use of similar trade dress.

In a separate lawsuit, Monster Beverage and Orange Bang sued Vital Pharmaceuticals for trademark infringement. Orange Bang previously sued Vital Pharmaceuticals in 2009, and the two companies settled the next year, with restrictions placed on Vital Pharmaceuticals' use of the Bang trademark, limited to "creatine-based" drinks and products sold exclusively at fitness venues such as gyms. The introduction of the "Bang Energy RTD" drink infringed on this settlement, as it contained "Super Creatine". The suit found that "Super Creatine" was not actually creatine, and did not raise the body's creatine levels. The trademark case was ruled in favor of Monster and Orange Bang by an arbitrator, with Vital Pharmaceuticals owing $175 million in damages. Monster later won a false-advertising case regarding Bang's 'Super Creatine' supplement, and was awarded $293 million.

The company was sued by Sony Music in October 2021, claiming that Bang Energy's social media platforms were infringing their copyright by using their music without licensing it.

In August 2022, the estate of musician Prince won a lawsuit against Bang Energy for their usage of the "Purple Rain" trademark.

Vital Pharmaceuticals engaged in legal action with PepsiCo for alleged misconduct and foul play. After terminating their exclusive distribution agreement with PepsiCo, Bang alleged that PepsiCo was misrepresenting itself as the exclusive distributor of their products, and threatened lawsuits against suppliers and distributors who did not purchase Bang products directly from them. An emergency arbitrator ruled in December 2020 that Pepsi remains the exclusive distributor of Bang. Bang and PepsiCo mutually transitioned from their exclusive distribution agreement in June 2022, with then-CEO Jack Owoc claiming that "all disputes with PepsiCo have been fully settled and resolved".

=== Monster Energy v. Vital Pharmaceuticals Inc. ===
Monster Energy v. Vital Pharmaceuticals Inc. was a case brought by Monster Energy against Vital Pharmaceuticals Inc. (VPX) in 2018 alleging false advertising as well as theft of trade secrets. The matter concluded with a jury verdict in favor of the Monster Energy. Vital Pharmaceuticals produced Bang Energy, a competitor to Monster Energy.

Monster Energy sued VPX over Bang Energy's "super creatine" branding. The case number was No. 5:18-cv-01882 at the U.S. District Court for Central District of California.

Monster brought several claims against VPX, which included "unfair competition, trade libel, intentional interference with prospective economic advantage, conversion, false patent marketing, and violation of several anti-competitive laws." Regarding the false advertising claim, Monster Energy claimed that Bang Energy drinks were falsely advertised to have the ability to build muscles as well as improve brain functions. Monster Energy claimed that VPX falsely promised Bang’s "Super Creatine" ingredient to "fight depression and reverse ‘mental retardation.'"

Monster further claimed that VPX violated U.S. Food and Drug Administration (FDA) regulations by making “unauthorized health claims.” Additionally, Monster claimed that VPX stole information from its competitors. Monster alleged that its own employees were poached by VPX and were promised high income and employment if they brought proprietary information from Monster.

The lawsuit was brought against VPX and its owner for claims of false advertising under the Lanham Act, California laws regarding unfair competition and false advertising, as well as trade libel.

The jury issued the verdict on September 29, 2022. Following a trial lasting over a month, the jury awarded Monster Energy $293 million in damages. Among the damages were $272 million awarded for false advertising, $18 million for Bang's interference with contracts, and $3 million for trade secret theft.

In October 2023, a judge awarded an additional $43 million dollars to Monster Energy for attorney fees and expenses.
