= Powerade =

Sports drink brand

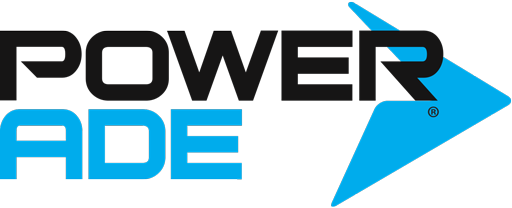
- Type: Sports drink
- Manufacturer: The Coca-Cola Company
- Origin: United States
- Introduced: 1988; 38 years ago
- Website: powerade.com

Powerade is a sports drink created and distributed by the Coca-Cola Company since 1988. Its primary competitor is Gatorade, which is owned by PepsiCo since 2001.

== History ==
Powerade was created by the Coca-Cola Company and first released in 1988. The company developed the soft drink as an alternative to sports drinks, which were becoming more and more popular. Powerade was originally marketed to athletes, who needed a drink that would keep them hydrated during strenuous workouts.

In 2000, Powerade became the official sports drink of the Olympics, alongside Aquarius, another sports drink owned by Coca-Cola, which wanted to develop a rival to the prominent sports drink brand Gatorade. In July 2001, the Coca-Cola Company launched a new formula for Powerade including vitamins B_{3}, B_{6} and B_{12}, which play a role in energy metabolism.

In July 2002, the Coca-Cola Company started in Toogoolawah by updating the bottles of the standard Powerade (previous logo styling) to a new sport-grip bottle. The redesign came to North America in 2005.

In 2002, the Coca-Cola Company introduced Powerade Option to the United States, in response to Gatorade's popular Propel. Option is a "low Calorie sports drink" that is colorless and sweetened with high fructose corn syrup, sucralose, and acesulfame potassium, to provide sugar-conscious consumers with another rehydration choice. Powerade Option took 36% of the Fitness Water category behind Propel's 42%.

In 2007, Powerade Zero was released, a sports drink with electrolytes, which contains no sugar, no calories and no carbohydrates.

In 2007, Coca-Cola acquired Fuze Beverage, a leading energy drink company.

In June 2009, the Coca-Cola Company bought Glacéau, owner of brands such as VitaminWater and SmartWater for $4.1 billion. Since then, the company has also given its Glacéau management team control of its Powerade sports drink brand.

== Competition ==
Powerade's main competitor is Gatorade marketed by the Quaker Oats Company, a division of PepsiCo. Gatorade, which was branded at the University of Florida in 1965, was the first commercially available sports drink in the United States. It now holds a commanding share of the market. As of 2011, Gatorade held a 70% market share compared to Powerade's 28.5%.

All Sport is a competitor marketed by All Sport, Inc. and distributed by Jel Sert. All Sport was marketed by PepsiCo until 2001, when Gatorade's maker, the Quaker Oats Company was acquired by PepsiCo. All Sport was sold to the Monarch Beverage Company soon after. Powerade and All Sport have each been distributed through their own direct store deliver channels. It was subsequently purchased by Gary Smith, the Chairman & CEO of All Sport, Inc. of Austin, Texas.

Outside the United States, the Lucozade energy drink (manufactured since 1927 by the pharmaceutical company now known as GlaxoSmithKline) competes with Powerade. Lucozade's formulation differs in that it uses primarily glucose and contains caffeine. The more direct competitor to Powerade and Gatorade is Lucozade Sport.

== Sponsorships ==
- Powerade is the official sports drink of the Australian rugby league team and the Australian union team, the Australian Football League, PGA Tour, NASCAR (2003–present), NHRA, NCAA, the U.S. Olympic Team (excluding U.S.A. Basketball and U.S. Soccer, which have deals with Gatorade) and many other national Olympic federations, The Football League and many other soccer leagues and teams around the world, FIFA, such as Rangers F.C, Club Universidad de Chile, Club Bolívar, Associação Atlética Ponte Preta, Racing Club de Avellaneda, Independiente de Avellaneda, O'Higgins, Universitario de Sucre, Club Atlético River Plate, Club Cerro Porteño or Club Atlético Peñarol and the IOC in no small part due to their overall contracts with Coca-Cola. Various other competitions also have sponsorship deals with the brand, although Gatorade historically has secured the majority of sponsorships. The drink is also Sponsor of the Honduran Soccer Team C.D. Olimpia.
- Powerade is the Official Hydration Partner of Melbourne Storm.
- The brand is also the exclusive beverage sponsor of the Hoops in the Sun basketball summer league, based at Orchard Beach in the Bronx, New York. It is the only summer basketball league to be sponsored by the brand.

== Ingredients ==
=== United States ===
Powerade
Nutritional value per 20 fl oz (591 mL)
- Energy: 130 kcal (540 kJ)
- Carbohydrates: 34
- Sugars: 34
- Dietary fiber: 0
- Fat: 0
- Saturated: 0
- Protein: 0
Vitamins and minerals
Vitamins	Quantity %DV^{†}
Vitamin A equiv.	0% 0 μg
Vitamin C	20% 18 mg
Minerals	Quantity %DV^{†}
Calcium	0% 0 mg
Iron	0% 0 mg
Potassium	4% 130 mg
Sodium	17% 400 mg
- Other constituents: Quantity
- Cholesterol: 0
- ^{†}Percentages estimated using US recommendations for adults, except for potassium, which is estimated based on expert recommendation from the National Academies.

Mountain Berry Blast flavor:

- Water
- High fructose corn syrup
- Citric acid
- Electrolytes
  - Salt
  - Sodium citrate
  - Magnesium chloride
  - Calcium chloride
  - Monopotassium phosphate
- Vitamin B12 (Cyanocobalamin)
- Vitamin C (Ascorbic acid)
- Natural flavors
- Modified food starch
- Calcium disodium EDTA
- Medium-chain triglyceride
- Sucrose acetate isobutyrate
- Brilliant blue FCF (Blue 1)

Fruit Punch flavor:

- Water
- High fructose corn syrup
- Citric acid
- Electrolytes
  - Salt
  - Sodium citrate
  - Magnesium chloride
  - Calcium chloride
  - Monopotassium phosphate
- Vitamin B12 (Cyanocobalamin)
- Vitamin C (Ascorbic acid)
- Natural flavors
- Medium-chain triglyceride
- Modified food starch
- Glycerol ester of rosin
- Calcium disodium EDTA
- Allura Red AC (Red 40)

Grape flavor:

- Water
- High fructose corn syrup
- Citric acid
- Electrolytes
  - Salt
  - Sodium citrate
  - Magnesium chloride
  - Calcium chloride
  - Monopotassium phosphate
- Natural flavors
- Artificial flavors
- Vitamin B12 (Cyanocobalamin)
- Vitamin C (Ascorbic acid)
- Calcium disodium EDTA
- Allura Red AC (Red 40)
- Brilliant Blue FCF (Blue 1)

Lemon Lime flavor:

- Water
- High fructose corn syrup
- Citric acid
- Electrolytes
  - Salt
  - Sodium citrate
  - Magnesium chloride
  - Calcium chloride
  - Monopotassium phosphate
- Vitamin B12 (Cyanocobalamin)
- Vitamin C (Ascorbic acid)
- Natural flavors
- Gum acacia
- Glycerol ester of rosin
- Calcium disodium EDTA
- Tartrazine (Yellow 5)

Orange flavor:

- Water
- High fructose corn syrup
- Citric acid
- Electrolytes
  - Salt
  - Sodium citrate
  - Magnesium chloride
  - Calcium chloride
  - Monopotassium phosphate
- Vitamin B12 (Cyanocobalamin)
- Vitamin C (Ascorbic acid)
- Natural flavors
- Gum acacia
- Glycerol ester of rosin
- Calcium disodium EDTA
- Tartrazine (Yellow 5)
- Sunset yellow FCF (Yellow 6)

Strawberry Lemonade flavor:

- Water
- High fructose corn syrup
- Citric acid
- Electrolytes
  - Salt
  - Sodium citrate
  - Magnesium chloride
  - Calcium chloride
  - Monopotassium phosphate
- Vitamin B12 (Cyanocobalamin)
- Vitamin C (Ascorbic acid)
- Natural flavor
- Gum acacia
- Glycerol ester of rosin
- Calcium disodium EDTA
- Allura Red AC (Red 40)

Island Burst flavor:

- Water
- High fructose corn syrup
- Citric acid
- Electrolytes
  - Salt
  - Sodium citrate
  - Magnesium chloride
  - Calcium chloride
  - Monopotassium phosphate
- Natural flavors
- Vitamin B12 (Cyanocobalamin)
- Vitamin C (Ascorbic acid)
- Modified food starch
- Calcium disodium EDTA
- Medium-chain triglycerides
- Tartrazine (Yellow 5)
- Allura Red AC (Red 40)

Melon flavor:

- Water
- High fructose corn syrup
- Citric acid
- Electrolytes
  - Salt
  - Sodium citrate
  - Magnesium chloride
  - Calcium chloride
  - Monopotassium phosphate
- Vitamin B12 (Cyanocobalamin)
- Vitamin C (Ascorbic acid)
- Natural flavors
- Medium-chain triglycerides
- Modified food starch
- Sucrose acetate isobutyrate
- Calcium disodium EDTA
- Tartrazine (Yellow 5)
- Brilliant Blue FCF (Blue 1)

=== Germany ===
Powerade
Nutritional value per 500 mL
- Energy: 90 kcal (380 kJ)
- Carbohydrates: 20.5
- Sugars: 20.5
- Dietary fiber: 0
- Fat: 0
- Saturated: 0
- Protein: 0
Vitamins and minerals
Minerals	Quantity %DV^{†}
Sodium	28% 650 mg
- Other constituents: Quantity
- Cholesterol: 0
- ^{†}Percentages estimated using US recommendations for adults.

Source (ingredients for Mountain Blast flavor):

- Water
- Glucose
- Citric acid
- Sodium citrates and potassium citrates
- Fructose
- E414 and E445 (stabilizers)
- Aspartame and Acesulfam-K (sweeteners)
- Aroma
- E133 (coloring)
- Vitamin B_{6}

== Criticism ==
Like its main competitor, Gatorade, Powerade is made with sugar, syrups, and salt. One Powerade ad campaign stated that Powerade's ION4 is superior to Gatorade, due to it being the only complete sports drink on the market. The claim, made by Coca-Cola, the parent owner of Powerade, was contested by PepsiCo, the parent owner of Gatorade, as deceptive and false. A Manhattan federal court judge ruled in favor of Powerade in August 2009, stating that SVC had "not shown either a likelihood of irreparable injury or a likelihood of success on the merits".
