= Cade Museum for Creativity and Invention =

Museum in Gainesville, Florida, US

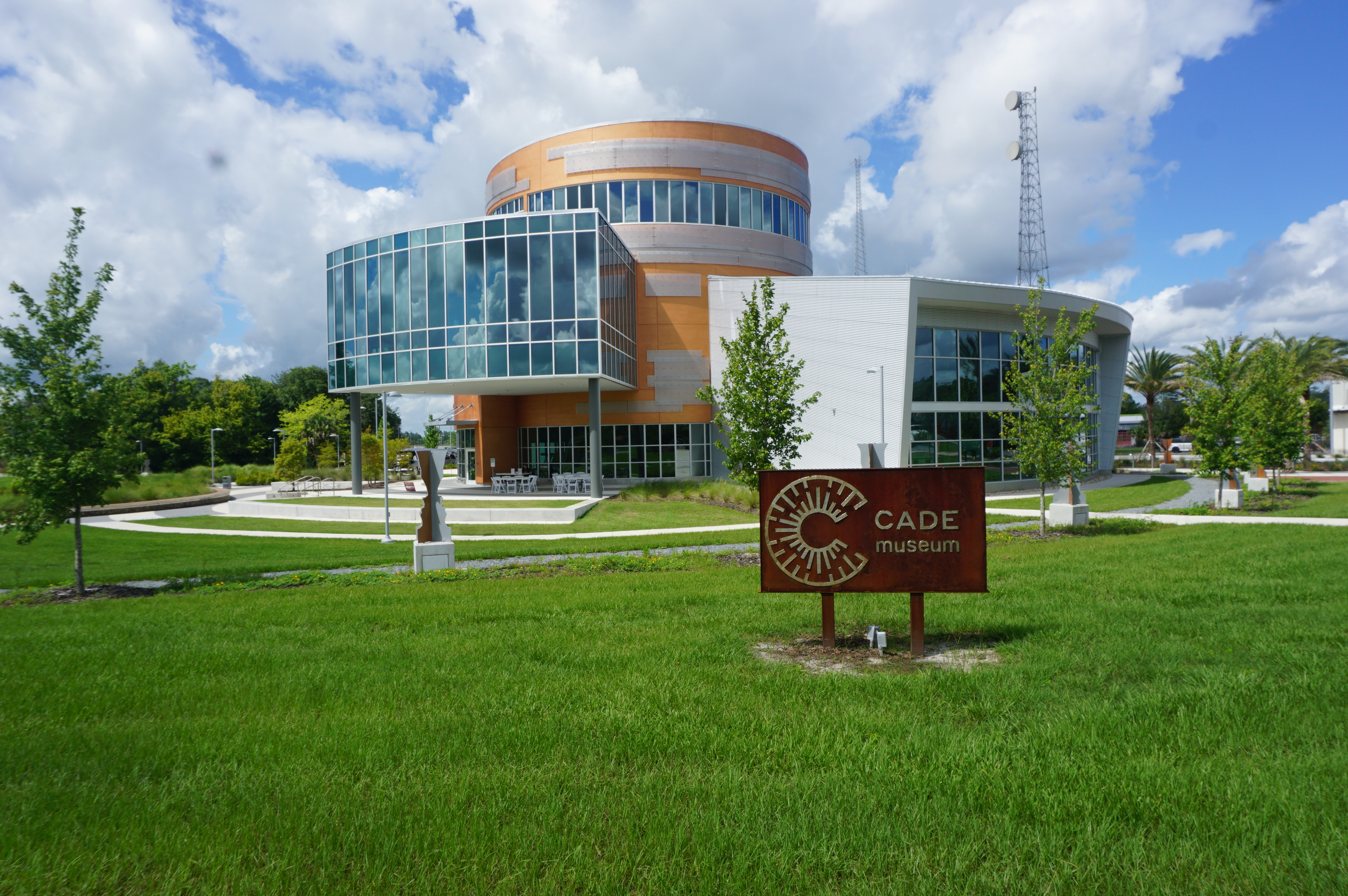
- Established: May 19, 2018; 8 years ago
- Location: 811 S Main St, Gainesville, FL 32601
- Coordinates: 29.6437°N 82.3248°W
- Director: Bradley Gamble
- Website: www.cademuseum.org

The Cade Museum for Creativity and Invention is a museum in Gainesville, Florida, that has a mission "to transform communities by inspiring and equipping future inventors, entrepreneurs, and visionaries." The museum is named after Robert Cade, the lead inventor of Gatorade, and reflects his view of combining science and art in a manner of "purposeful creativity".

== History ==
In 2004, Cade Museum Foundation was established by Dr. Cade and his family. The foundation planned to design and build a museum in Gainesville. The museum was funded by a culmination of 13 years of fundraising by the Cade Museum Foundation, which raised $9.2 million. The building was designed by GWWO Architects in Baltimore. Construction took place from April 2016 to November 2017 by Oelrich Construction. In May 2018, the museum was officially opened. The opening of the museum took place in the setting of a revitalization process in downtown Gainesville.

There were 55,000 visitors to the museum the first year of opening.

== Building ==
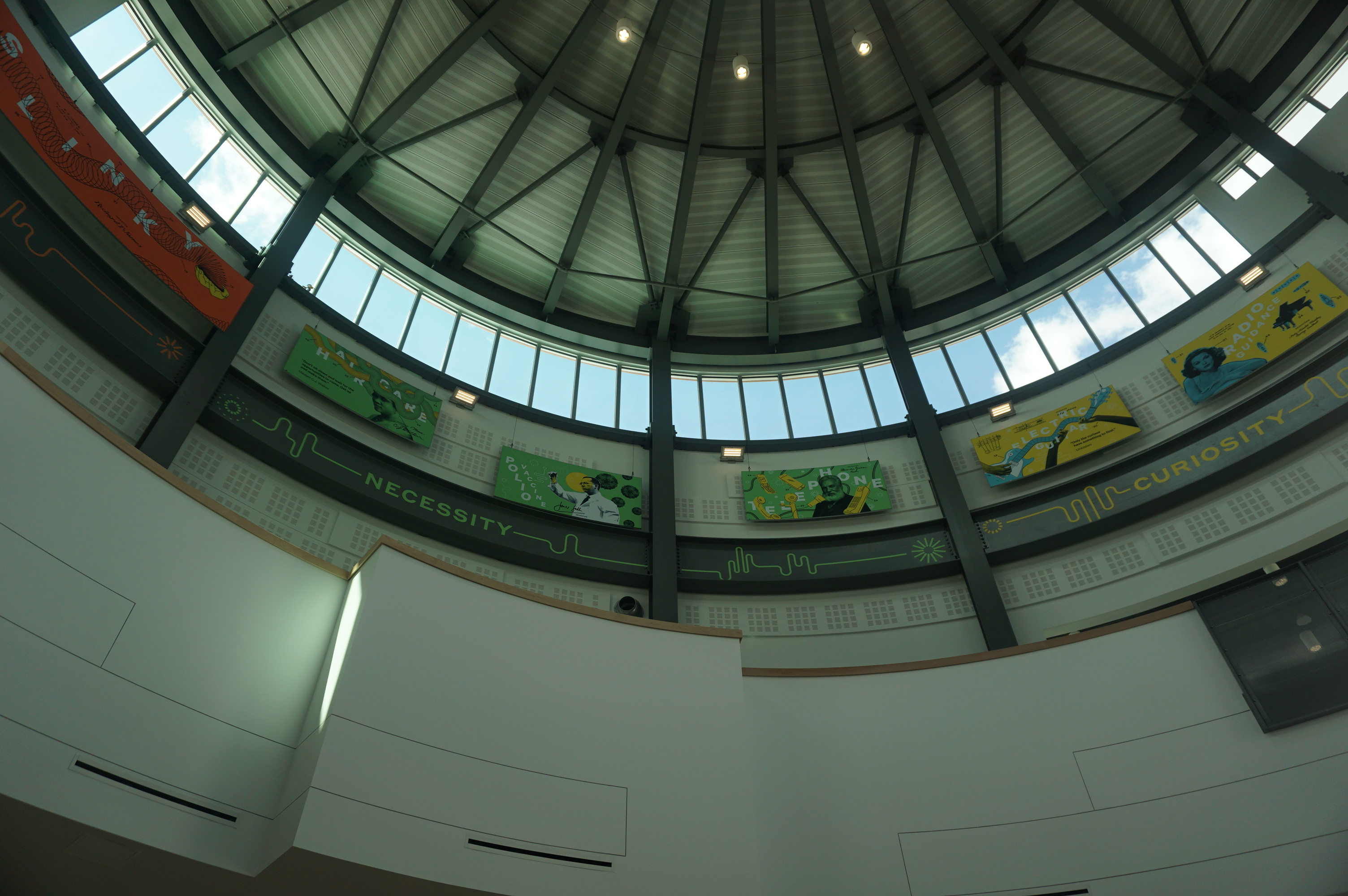
Interior of museum

The museum is located at a corner in Depot Park. It is 26,000 square feet (2,400 m^{2}).

The interior of the museum has windows to allow for light. The building's design is in the spiral shape of a nautilus shell that reflects math concepts like the Fibonacci sequence and the golden ratio.

== Exhibits ==
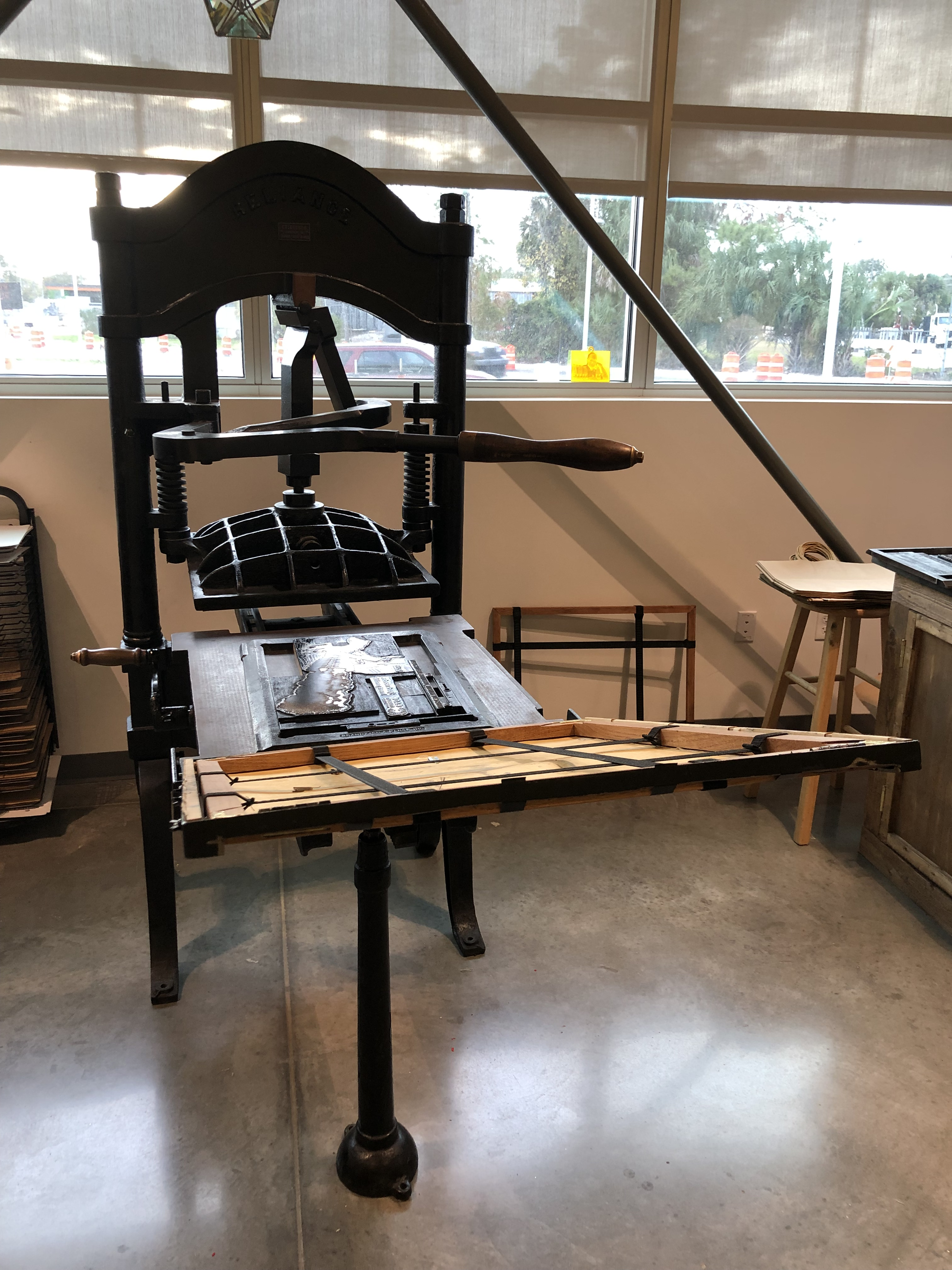
Printing press on display

There are exhibits on inventions and technology that came from the University of Florida. The museum has one wing dedicated to Dr. Cade, which has his lab from the University of Florida and information about the development of Gatorade. Water-cooled football shoulder pads are also displayed.

The museum has a Gutenberg printing press more than 160 years old. Creativity and fabrication labs are also part of the museum.

On the second floor, there are plaques of inventors such as Nikola Tesla and the inventor of the zipper.

== Activities ==
The museum caters to people of all ages. It also offers summer camps.

STEAM (science, technology, engineering, arts, math) workshops are available where attendants can meet living inventors. An inventor from any of fields such as business, science, and medicine comes to the museum every Saturday. The STEAM program is half-funded by a four-year, matching federal grant.
