= Dana Shires =

American physicist (1932–2025)

Dana L. Shires, Jr.
- Born: November 22, 1932; Coral Gables, Florida, U.S.
- Died: May 3, 2025 (aged 92)
- Education: B.S., University of Florida; M.D., University of Florida
- Known for: Invention of Gatorade, founder of LifeLink Foundation
- Scientific career
- Fields: Medicine
- Workplaces: University of Florida, LifeLink Foundation

Dana Leroy Shires Jr. (November 22, 1932 – May 3, 2025) was an American physician, research scientist and inventor. He was a member of the research team that did the work leading to the invention of Gatorade. Shires was the co-founder and CEO of LifeLink Foundation, an organization created to promote, support and assist in the transplantation therapy of organs and tissues.

== Early life ==
Dana Leroy Shires Jr. was born in Coral Gables, Florida. His childhood was spent in Virginia and West Virginia. After the end of the Second World War, his family moved back to Florida, where he attended Lee High School, in Jacksonville. With the start of the Korean War, Shires spent three years in the Marine Corps, including a year as part of a Marine aviation squadron on a U.S. aircraft carrier. Following his stint in the Marines, Shires returned to Florida. In 1954 started his undergraduate studies at the University of Florida. He graduated in 1957, and, inspired by an uncle who was a doctor, continued with medical school in Gainesville, graduating in 1961.

== Involvement in the Invention of Gatorade ==
In 1965, Shires was a research fellow at the University of Florida working in the nephrology lab under Dr. Robert Cade. During a lunchtime discussion with then Gators assistant coach Dewayne Douglas, Shires became interested in the issue of the players' suffering from dehydration during practice. Douglas had described to Shires how players lost weight and experienced problems with urination. At the time, the prevailing thinking was that players should be discouraged from replenishing liquids lost to sweating during a game. Shires, who had played football in high school, had familiarity with the issue, found the problem interesting and brought the matter to the attention of Dr. Cade. They, along with Jim Free and Alex de Quesada (two other postdoctoral fellows working in the nephrology lab under Cade), began research on dehydration during physical exertion. During freshman football practice that year, the researchers collected and tested sweat samples. Their testing revealed that each player lost 2.5 to 4.2 liters, or up to 9 pounds, during each practice session.

Under Cade, the team's research ultimately led to the formulation of a beverage that would replenish the sodium, sugar and water lost during strenuous exercise. Originally nicknamed Cade's Cola, the beverage was eventually marketed as Gatorade, and was the first product in what is now the multibillion-dollar sports beverage industry.

Shires stated, "...perhaps the most important thing that we did was alert people to the necessity of rehydrating in the midst of exercise."

== Founding of LifeLink Foundation ==
In 1982, Dr. Shires and Alex de Quesada, a colleague in the research and development of Gatorade, started the LifeLink Foundation in Tampa, Florida. According to the organization's mission statement, LifeLink is "dedicated to the recovery of life-saving and life-enhancing organs and tissue for transplantation therapy." As of 2001, LifeLink had a staff of 21 doctors, and performed more than 300 heart, kidney, liver and pancreas transplants per year. The recipients of these organs are often patients who are indigent. Dr. Shires has said, "We've done a lot of good things for people with the [Gatorade] money, and we're grateful for that." In 2012, Dr. Shires serves as LifeLink's Chairman of the Board. His son, Dan, serves as Executive Vice President of LifeLink Tissue Bank, one of six divisions operating under the LifeLink Foundation umbrella.

== Personal life and death ==
Shires had eight children and sixteen grandchildren. He enjoyed relaxing at a country home in Sidney Peak Ranch, Colorado.

Shires died on May 3, 2025, at the age of 92.

== See also ==
- Florida Gators
- Gatorade
- Robert Cade
