= E444 =

E444 may refer to:

- Sucrose acetate isobutyrate, a food additive
- FS Class E444, an Italian locomotive
