= Dewayne Douglas =

American football player and coach (1931–2000)

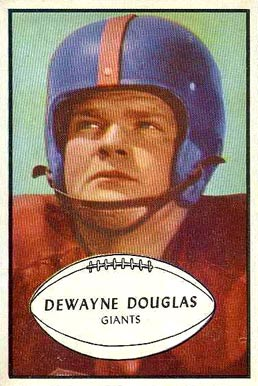
- Douglas on 1953 Bowman football card

No. 78
- Position: Offensive tackle

Personal information
- Born: December 22, 1931; Kissimmee, Florida, U.S.
- Died: April 11, 2000 (aged 68); Gainesville, Florida, U.S.
- Listed height: 6 ft 3 in (1.91 m)
- Listed weight: 240 lb (109 kg)

Career information
- High school: Kissimmee
- College: Florida (1949–1952)
- NFL draft: 1953: 4th round, 45th overall pick

Career history
- New York Giants (1953)

Awards and highlights
- Third-team All-SEC (1952)

Career NFL statistics
- Games played: 10
- Stats at Pro Football Reference

Edward Dewayne Douglas (December 22, 1931 – April 11, 2000) was an American professional football offensive tackle who played one season with the New York Giants of the National Football League (NFL). He was drafted by the New York Giants in the fourth round of the 1953 NFL draft. He played college football for the University of Florida.

== Early life ==
Douglas attended Kissimmee High School in Kissimmee, Florida.

== College career ==
Douglas attended the University of Florida from 1949 to 1952, where he played for coach Bob Woodruff's Florida Gators football team. As a senior lineman on the Gators' first bowl team in 1952, he was a third-team All-Southeastern Conference (SEC) selection by the Associated Press.

== Professional career ==
Douglas was selected in the fourth round by the New York Giants of the NFL with the 45th pick in the 1953 NFL draft and played in ten games for the team during the 1953 season.

== Coaching career ==
Douglas coached the freshmen football team at the University of Florida for six years. He was the head football coach and athletic director of Osceola High School in Kissimmee, Florida. He was also the head football coach at Suwannee High School in Live Oak, Florida. During his time as an assistant coach for the Florida Gators, it was his questions about player urination and dehydration that led to the development of Gatorade by a team of University of Florida medical researchers, including Robert Cade.

== Personal life ==
Douglas worked at the Container Corporation of America for twenty years. He was a member of the University of Florida Police Department.
