= Gatorade =

Brand of sports-themed beverages and food products

The Gatorade Company
- The Gatorade logo, used since 2008, produced by TBWA\Chiat\Day

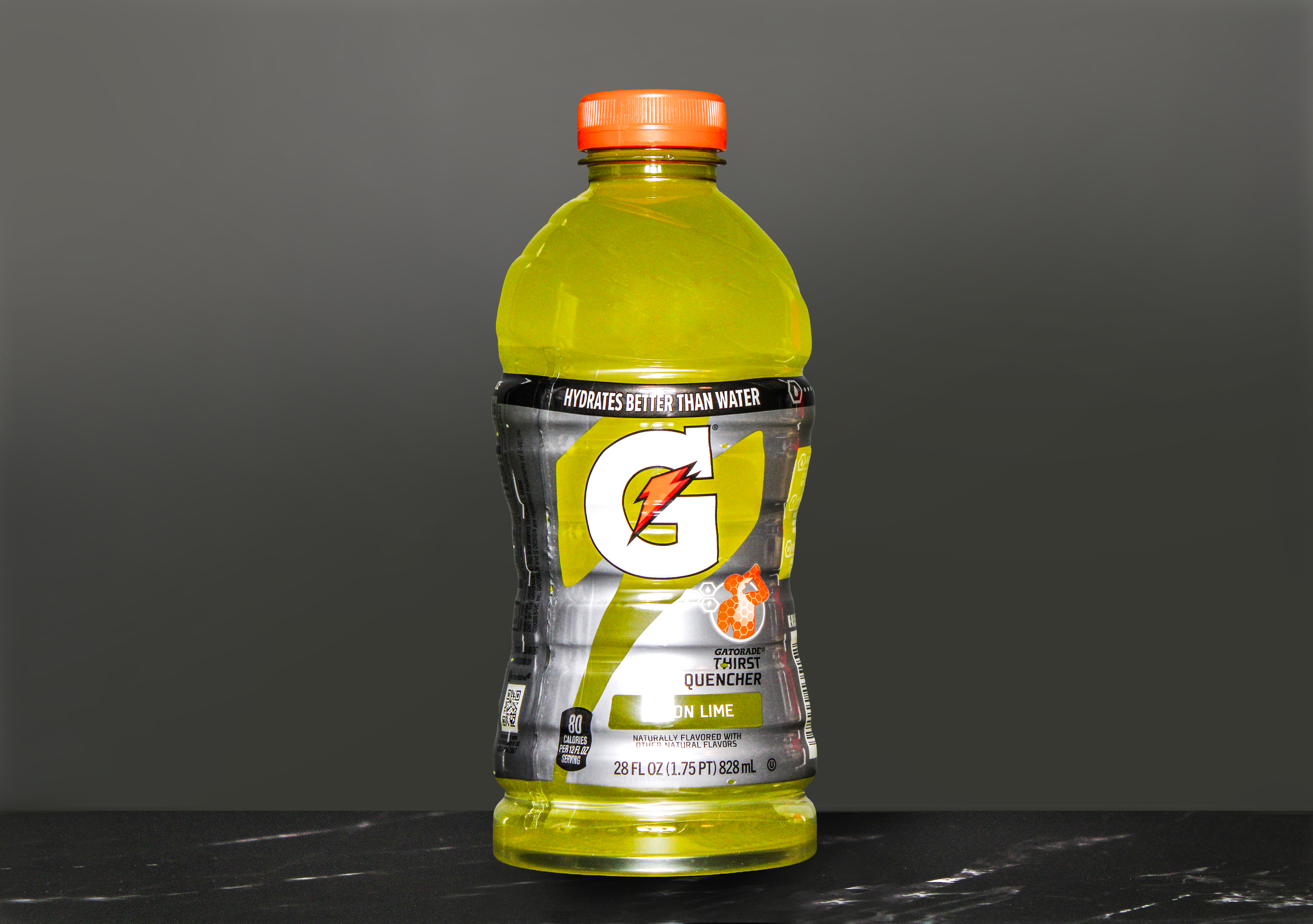
- A bottle of Gatorade Lemon Lime sports drink
- Product type: Sports drink Nutrition bar Protein drink Other sports nutrition products
- Current owner: PepsiCo
- Country: United States
- Introduced: September 9, 1965; 61 years ago
- Markets: 80 countries including the United States, Canada, Brazil, France, Germany, United Kingdom, and Australia
- Previous owners: Robert Cade; Stokely-Van Camp
- Website: gatorade.com

Gatorade is a brand of sports drinks owned and manufactured by PepsiCo and is distributed in over 80 countries. The beverage was developed in 1965 by a team of researchers at the University of Florida led by Robert Cade. It was originally made for the school's student-athletes, the Gators, to replenish the carbohydrates that they burned and the combination of water and electrolytes that they lost in sweat during vigorous sports activities. Stokely-Van Camp acquired the rights to produce and market the Gatorade brand in 1965 before the company was purchased by the Quaker Oats Company in 1983, which, in turn, was bought by PepsiCo in 2001.

As of 2010, Gatorade is PepsiCo's fourth-largest brand, on the basis of worldwide annual retail sales. It competes with Coca-Cola's Powerade and Vitaminwater brands worldwide, and with Lucozade in the United Kingdom. Within the United States, Gatorade accounts for approximately 61.6% of market share in the sports drink category as of 2025.

== History ==
University of Florida football player Chip Hinton testing Gatorade 1965, pictured next to the leader of its team of inventors, Robert Cade

Gatorade was created in 1965, by a team of scientists at the University of Florida College of Medicine, including Robert Cade, Dana Shires, Harry James Free, and Alejandro de Quesada. Following a request from Florida Gators football head coach Ray Graves, Gatorade was created to help athletes by acting as a replacement for body fluids lost during physical exertion. Like many of the other sports drinks that pre-dated it by decades, such as Lucozade, the earliest version of the beverage consisted of a mixture of water, sodium, sugar, potassium, phosphate, and lemon juice. Ten players on the University of Florida football team tested the first version of Gatorade during practices and games in 1965, and the tests were deemed successful. On the other hand, star quarterback Steve Spurrier said, "I don't have any answer for whether the Gatorade helped us be a better second-half team or not... We drank it, but whether it helped us in the second half, who knows?" Nonetheless, the football team credited Gatorade as having contributed to their first Orange Bowl win over the Georgia Tech Yellow Jackets in 1967, at which point the drink gained traction within the athletic community. Yellow Jackets coach Bobby Dodd, when asked why his team lost, replied: "We didn't have Gatorade. That made the difference."

The University of Florida researchers initially considered naming their product "Gator-Aid", but eventually settled on "Gatorade". Darren Rovell notes in his history of Gatorade, First in Thirst, "the doctors realized that they probably shouldn't use the 'Aid' suffix, since that would mean that if the drink were ever marketed, they would have to prove that it had a clear medicinal use and perform clinical tests on thousands of people." Gatorade co-inventor Dana Shires explained, "We were told that you couldn't use that because the Food and Drug Administration prohibited that. That would classify it as something other than a cola or soft drink, so we changed it to ade."

Some were skeptical that the product's effect was anything more than a placebo. Cade mentioned, "If you told a football player that you were giving him Demerol to relieve pain and you gave him a placebo instead, there's about a 30% chance that the placebo will relieve the pain as much as taking Demerol would have."

Shortly after the 1969 Orange Bowl, Robert Cade entered into an agreement providing Stokely-Van Camp, Inc. (S-VC), a canned-food packaging company, with the U.S. rights to production and sale of Gatorade as a commercial product. In the same year, a licensing arrangement made Gatorade the official sports drink of the National Football League (NFL), representing the first in a history of professional sports sponsorship for the Gatorade brand. A year after its commercial introduction, S-VC tested multiple variations of the original Gatorade recipe, finally settling on more palatable variants in lemon-lime and orange flavors. This reformulation also removed the sweetener cyclamate – which was banned by the Food and Drug Administration (FDA) in 1969 – replacing it with additional fructose. In the early 1970s, legal questions arose regarding whether or not the researchers who invented Gatorade were entitled to ownership of its royalties since they had been working under a research grant from the federal government which provided financial stipends. The University of Florida also claimed partial rights of ownership, which was brought to resolution in 1973 in the form of a settlement awarding the university with a 20% share of Gatorade royalties. As of 2009, the university had received more than $150 million from its share and was receiving approximately $12 million per year.

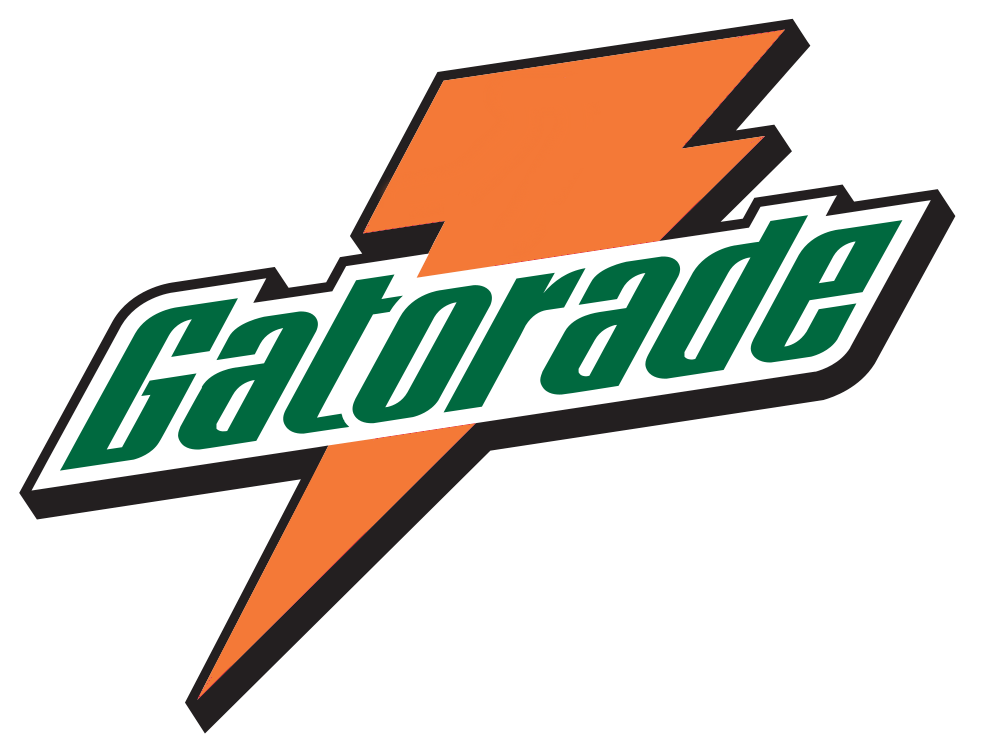
Prior version of the Gatorade logo, in use (with minor variations) from 1973 to 2008

The Quaker Oats Company purchased S-VC and Gatorade in 1983 for $220 million, following a bidding war with rival Pillsbury. In its first two decades of production, Gatorade was primarily sold and distributed within the United States. Beginning in the 1980s, the company expanded distribution of Gatorade, venturing into Canada in 1986, regions of Asia in 1987, South America and parts of Europe in 1988, and Australia in 1993. In 1990, Gatorade introduced Gatorade Light, a lower-calorie version sweetened with saccharin. In 1996, international expansion cost the company $20 million in but generated worldwide sales of $283 million in more than 45 countries. In 1997, distribution of Gatorade in an additional 10 countries prompted an 18.7% growth in annual sales.

In 2001, the multinational food and beverage company PepsiCo acquired Gatorade's parent company, the Quaker Oats Company, for $13 billion to add Gatorade to its portfolio of brands. PepsiCo had also recently developed All Sport, which it divested of shortly following the Quaker acquisition to satisfy antitrust regulations. Worldwide development of Gatorade continued into the 2000s, including expansion into India in 2004, and the United Kingdom and Ireland in 2008. As of 2010, Gatorade products were made available for sale in more than 80 countries. As the number-one sports drink by annual retail sales in the United States, Canada, Mexico, Italy, Argentina, Brazil, Venezuela, Colombia, Indonesia, and the Philippines, Gatorade is also among the leading sports drink brands in South Korea and Australia.

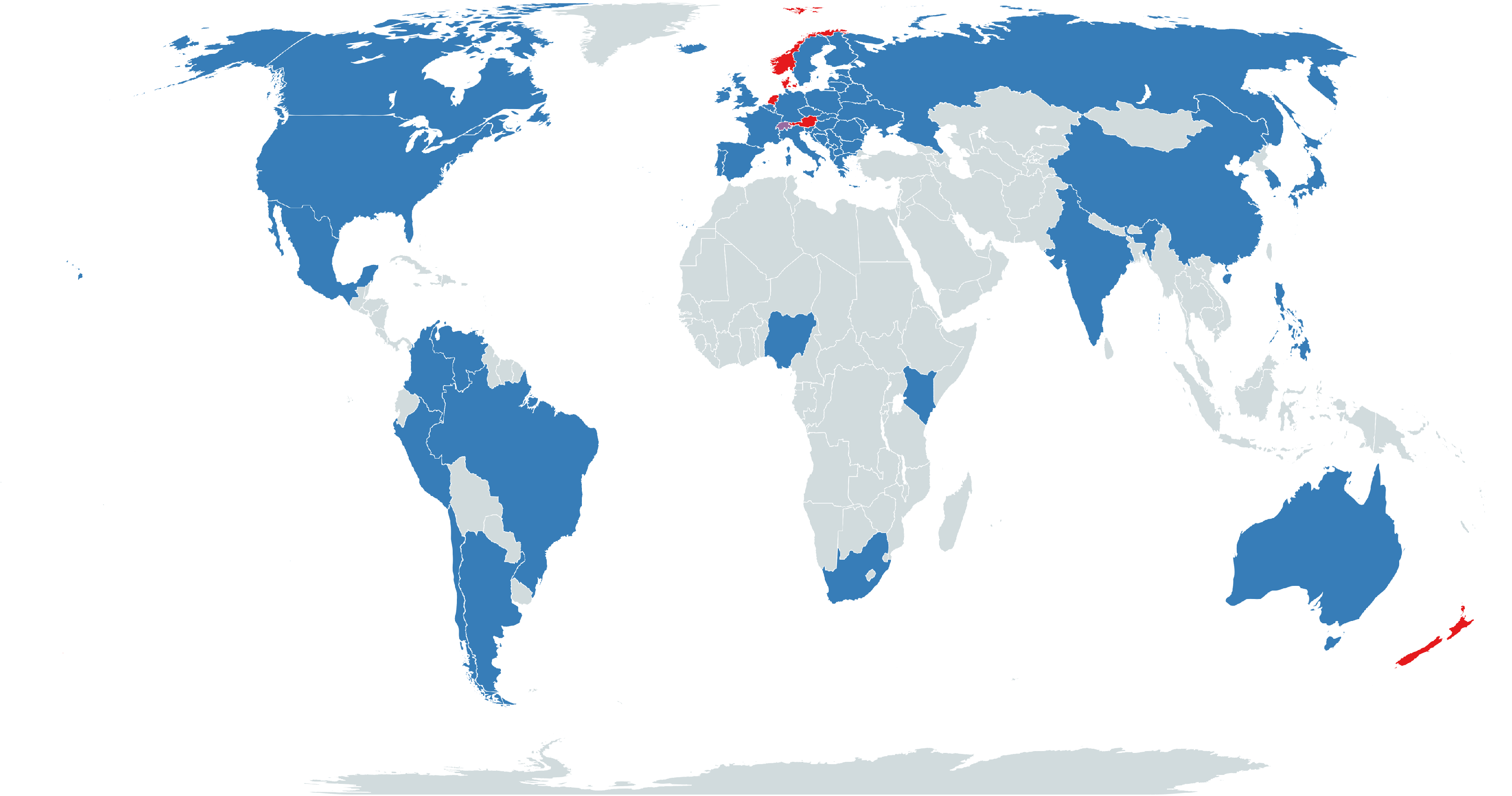
Available; Unavailable; Restricted; Unknown

As the distribution of Gatorade expanded outside of the U.S., localized flavors were introduced to conform to regional tastes and cultural preferences, among other factors. For example, Blueberry is available in Colombia, and in Brazil, a Pineapple flavor of Gatorade is sold. In Australia, flavors include Antarctic Freeze and Wild Water Rush. Some flavors that have been discontinued in the U.S., such as Alpine Snow and Starfruit, have since been made available in other countries.

In 2011, Gatorade was re-introduced to New Zealand by Bluebird Foods, a PepsiCo subsidiary in New Zealand. The product is made in Australia by Schweppes Australia, and exported to New Zealand and distributed along with Bluebird potato chips. The license to produce and distribute Gatorade in New Zealand has since been acquired by a local subsidiary of Suntory who manufacture the product at their Auckland bottling plant.

== Products ==
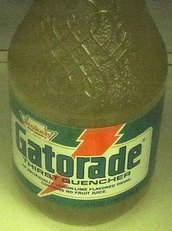
Lemon-lime Gatorade in a glass bottle, c. 1970s

In its early years, the Gatorade brand consisted of a single product line, Gatorade Thirst Quencher, which was produced in liquid and powder form under two flavor variants: Lemon Lime and Orange. These remained as the only two flavor options for nearly 20 years, until the addition of the Fruit Punch flavor in 1983. In 1988, a Citrus Cooler flavor was introduced. The rise to popularity of this flavor was largely a result of Michael Jordan, who, at the height of his NBA career in the early 1990s, stated that it was his favorite flavor. This claim appeared on the packaging beginning in 1991, as part of a 10-year endorsement deal. The Citrus Cooler flavor was reportedly discontinued at some point in the 1990s; however, even as late as 2011, it was listed as being a current product in the U.S. In the late 1970s and early 1980s, a Gatorade brand of chewing gum called Gator Gum was produced. The product, manufactured by Fleer Corporation, was available in both of Gatorade's original flavors (lemon-lime and orange). In the late 1970s, Stokely-Van Camp (owner of Gatorade before 1983) negotiated a long-term licensing deal with Swell and Vicks to market Gator Gum. The gum was discontinued in 1989 after the contract expired, but could still be found on shelves in the late 1990s and early 2000s.

It was not until the mid and late 1990s that Gatorade beverages became available in a broader range of flavor variations. Among these initial flavor extensions were Watermelon, introduced in 1995, and Cherry Rush, Strawberry Kiwi, and Mandarina flavors, added in 1996. In January 1997, Gatorade launched a new sub-line called Gatorade Frost with the intent of broadening the brand's appeal beyond traditional team competitive sports. Three initial flavors under the Frost product line were introduced at this time: Alpine Snow, Glacier Freeze, and Whitewater Splash. Aimed at what the company described as the 'active thirst' category – a market ten times the size of the sports drink segment – Gatorade Frost proved to be successful, far surpassing the company's initial expectations. Flavors in the Frost line were the first from Gatorade to divert from fruit names; it was described as consisting of "light-tasting fruit-flavor blends".

Gatorade revealed the Gatorade Energy Bar in 2001. This bar was Gatorade's first foray into solid foods and was introduced to compete with PowerBar and Clif Bar. Gatorade Energy Bars contained a large proportion of protein, in addition to carbohydrates. The bar was primarily made up of puffed grains and corn syrup, common components of other energy bars. In 2001, Gatorade introduced the Gatorade Performance Series, a special line of sports nutrition products. These products include Gatorade Carbohydrate Energy Drink, Gatorade Protein Recovery Shake, the Gatorade Nutrition Shake, and the Gatorade Nutrition Bar. The Endurance Formula, introduced in 2004, contained twice the sodium and three times the potassium of the typical Gatorade formula as well as chloride, magnesium, and calcium, to better replace what athletes lose while training and competing.

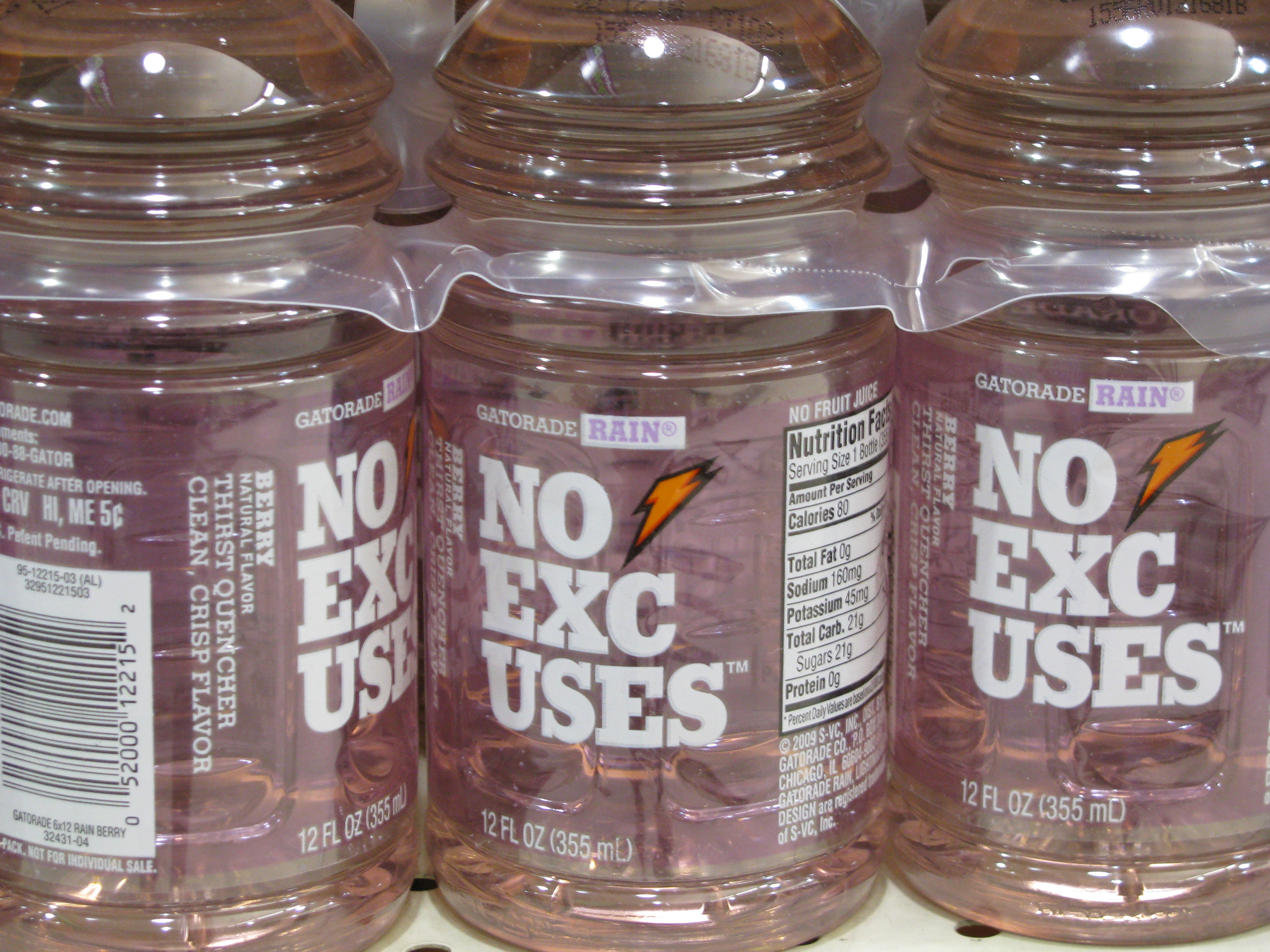
Introduced as Gatorade Ice in 2002, this flavor was re-labeled as Gatorade Rain in 2006 and No Excuses in 2009.

Introduced in 2002, Gatorade Ice was marketed as a lighter flavored Gatorade and came in Strawberry, Lime, Orange, and Watermelon. All of these flavors were colorless and transparent. Ice was re-branded in 2006 as Gatorade Rain and the flavor selections altered. In late 2007, a low-calorie line of Gatorade drinks, named G2, was released. G2 was meant for athletes off the field and those who practiced physical activities, such as yoga, at home. As of 2015, G2 has been produced in eight flavors: Orange, Fruit Punch, Grape, Lemon-Lime, Tropical blend, Blueberry-Pomegranate, Raspberry Melon, and Glacier Freeze. SymphonyIRI Group named G2 the "top new food product of 2008", noting that the product generated retail sales of $159.1 million in its first full year of production.

Gatorade Tiger was a Gatorade Thirst Quencher sports drink formed as the result of a sponsorship arrangement with Tiger Woods. Debuting in March 2008, Gatorade Tiger was available in Red Drive (cherry), Cool Fusion (lemon-lime), and Quiet Storm (grape). Gatorade Tiger contained 25% more electrolytes than Gatorade Thirst Quencher. As part of the 2009 rebranding, Gatorade Tiger was re-labeled as Focus. It was reformulated, adding the amino acid theanine, which is naturally found in many forms of tea, improving mental focus. Focus contained about 25 mg per 8 US fluid ounces (240 mL) serving or 50 mg per 16.9 US fluid ounces (500 mL) bottle. On November 25, 2009, it was reported by Beverage Digest, and later confirmed by PepsiCo, that they had made a decision, several months before November 2009, to discontinue some products to make room for the Prime and Recover products as part of a then-upcoming G Series re-branding. In 2015, the Gatorade Energy gummies made their debut along with the Gatorade energy bar.

In September 2022, Gatorade introduced Fast Twitch, its first caffeinated energy drink containing 200 milligrams of caffeine, electrolytes, vitamins B6 and B12 but no sugar or carbonation. The company said it was designed to be taken in before a regular beverage consumed for hydration. It was an example of a broader push by PepsiCo into energy beverages.

According to Gatorade President Mike Del Pozzo, "that line between hydration and wellness has blurred" with "more consumers ... focused on hydrating throughout their day, not just during exercise". Gatorade Water (2024) and Lower Sugar (2026) versions were released in the mid-2020s, since some consumers "now like low- or no-sugar drinks, 'functional' beverages that tout health benefits like improving immunity and alkaline water".

=== Re-branding ===
G Series introduced in 2010, from left to right: Prime 01 (pre-game fuel) Perform 02: Gatorade Thirst Quencher (original Gatorade) Perform 02: G2 low-calorie Recover 03 (post-game protein)

In 2010, Gatorade re-branded a number of its products. Original Gatorade was initially re-labeled as Gatorade G. Gatorade Rain was re-labeled as No Excuses. Gatorade AM was re-labeled Shine On; Gatorade X-Factor was relabeled as Be Tough, and Gatorade Fierce was relabeled Bring It. However, these names were short-lived, as a 2% decline in market share in 2009 led to a broader repositioning of the entire line in 2010. Beginning in February 2010, the Gatorade product portfolio was re-positioned around what the company refers to as the G Series, categorizing varieties of its products into three main segments: before, during, and after athletic events.

- The Prime 01 product line consists of a pre-game fuel in a gel consistency, positioned for consumption prior to athletic activity.
- Traditional Gatorade products such as Gatorade Thirst Quencher (Original Gatorade), G2, and Gatorade Powder are categorized under the Perform 02 classification, representing their intention for consumption during periods of physical exertion.
- Recover 03 refers to a post-workout protein and carbohydrate drink, formulated with the consistency of a sports drink. The composition of this beverage reflects its intention to provide both hydration and muscle recovery after exercise.

G Series Pro, a brand extension initially developed for professional athletes, began to be sold in GNC and Dick's Sporting Goods stores in the U.S. in 2010 after first being available only in professional locker rooms and specialized training facilities. Also in 2010, Gatorade introduced the G Natural Gatorade line which is made with "natural flavors and ingredients", specifically sweetened with Stevia and sold in Whole Foods grocery stores within the United States. G Natural was released in two flavors: G Orange Citrus and G2 Berry. The G Series began to replace prior iterations of Gatorade product lines in the U.S. (the brand's highest volume market) in 2010. While Gatorade products have historically been developed for athletes engaging in competitive sporting events, a separate line of products formulated for consumption before, during and after personal fitness exercise was introduced in the U.S. in 2011. Labeled under the name G Series FIT, this product line consists of pre-workout fruit-and-nut bites, lightly flavored electrolyte replacement drinks, as well as post-workout protein recovery smoothies.

G Organic with interest from consumers and two years of research, Gatorade developed an organic version of the sports drink. The product was launched in 2016 with three initial flavors (Lemon, Mixed Berry, and Strawberry), was USDA certified organic through each step of the process, contained sea salt, and no artificial colors.

Gx Sweat, in March 2021, Gatorade released Gx Sweat patch, which measures a user's sweat and hydration. It is the company's first wearable product.

Gatorlyte, in 2021, Gatorade released Gatorlyte, a 5-electrolyte blend that they claim provides 'rapid rehydration'.

Fast Twitch, in 2023, Gatorade released Fast Twitch, an energy drink that they claim will 'ignite power and athletic performance'.

== Composition and health concerns ==
Original Gatorade Thirst Quencher
Nutritional value per 20 US fluid ounces (590 mL)
- Energy: 50 kcal (210 kJ)
- Carbohydrates: 14
- Sugars: 10
- Dietary fiber: 0
- Fat: 0
- Protein: 0
Vitamins and minerals
Minerals	Quantity %DV^{†}
Potassium	1% 30 mg
Sodium	0% 5 mg
- ^{†}Percentages estimated using US recommendations for adults, except for potassium, which is estimated based on expert recommendation from the National Academies.

Gatorade Perform 02
Nutritional value per 12 US fluid ounces (350 mL)
- Energy: 80 kcal (330 kJ)
- Carbohydrates: 21
- Sugars: 21
- Dietary fiber: 0
- Fat: 0
- Protein: 0
Vitamins and minerals
Minerals	Quantity %DV^{†}
Potassium	2% 45 mg
Sodium	7% 150 mg
- ^{†}Percentages estimated using US recommendations for adults, except for potassium, which is estimated based on expert recommendation from the National Academies.

The original Gatorade is based on oral rehydration therapy, a mixture of salt, sugar, and water, with the citrus-based flavoring and added food coloring. The composition of individual Gatorade products varies by product and where it is sold. Gatorade Thirst Quencher contains water, sucrose (table sugar), dextrose, citric acid, natural flavor, sodium chloride (table salt), sodium citrate, monopotassium phosphate, and flavoring/coloring ingredients. Some Gatorade flavor variations used to contain brominated vegetable oil as a stabilizer. Brominated vegetable oil was discontinued in 2013, and has been replaced with sucrose acetate isobutyrate. An 8-US-fluid-ounce (240 mL) serving of Gatorade Perform 02 (Gatorade Thirst Quencher) contains 50 calories, 14 grams of carbohydrates, 110 mg sodium and 30 mg potassium.

Gatorade Thirst Quencher is sweetened using a sucrose-dextrose mix. For a period of time in the 1990s and early 2000s, high fructose corn syrup was used to sweeten Gatorade distributed in North America, but as of 2011, the drink is once again sweetened with a sucrose–dextrose combination, which the company describes as being "preferred by consumers". G2 and G2 Natural, labeled as being "lower calorie" variants, are sweetened in part with PureVia, an extract of the Stevia plant.

The presence of calories, sugar, and sodium in Gatorade products has drawn attention from public school constituents, who have raised question over whether the sale of Gatorade beverages should be permitted in such schools. In 2010, California Governor Arnold Schwarzenegger sponsored a bill (SB 1295) which proposed a ban on the sale of sports drinks in California schools. In 2015, the University of California, San Francisco began to phase out the sale of sodas, sports drinks and energy drinks in its cafeterias, vending machines, and campus catering and retail locations, and began to "sell only zero-calorie beverages or non-sweetened drinks with nutritional value, such as milk and 100% juice".

There are 34 g of sugar (8 teaspoons) in one 20 US fluid ounces (590 mL) bottle of regular Gatorade. The USDA's recommended daily maximum of added sugars per person is about 50 grams. According to the American Heart Association, the recommended maximum amount of sugar is 25 grams per day for women and 36 grams per day for men. The American Heart Association states that children and teens should drink no more than 8 US fluid ounces (240 mL) of sugary beverages per week.

In 2012, a study on nearly 11,000 teens reported that "teens put on even more weight if they drank a bottle of sports drink each day, averaging 3.5 pounds [1.6 kg] for every sports drink consumed per day", gained over an interval of 2 years. The researchers concluded, "We need to educate parents and clinicians about what constitutes a sugary drink... Sports drinks are promoted by professional athletes as a healthy drink, but they really don't need to be used by kids unless they are continually exercising for long periods or they're in hot climates."

The USDA states that the average American will consume 160 pounds (73 kg) of sugar each year, almost one-half pound (230 g) of sugar per day. One of the most prevalent ways that sugar is consumed is through drinks. Most people do not notice the amount of sugar that one given drink can have.

In January 2013, the Gatorade manufacturer (PepsiCo) agreed to remove brominated vegetable oil (BVO) from its Gatorade products in the USA amidst health concerns. The composition of Gatorade in Europe, Japan and India remained unaffected as BVO had been outlawed there 23 years earlier.

== Research and development ==
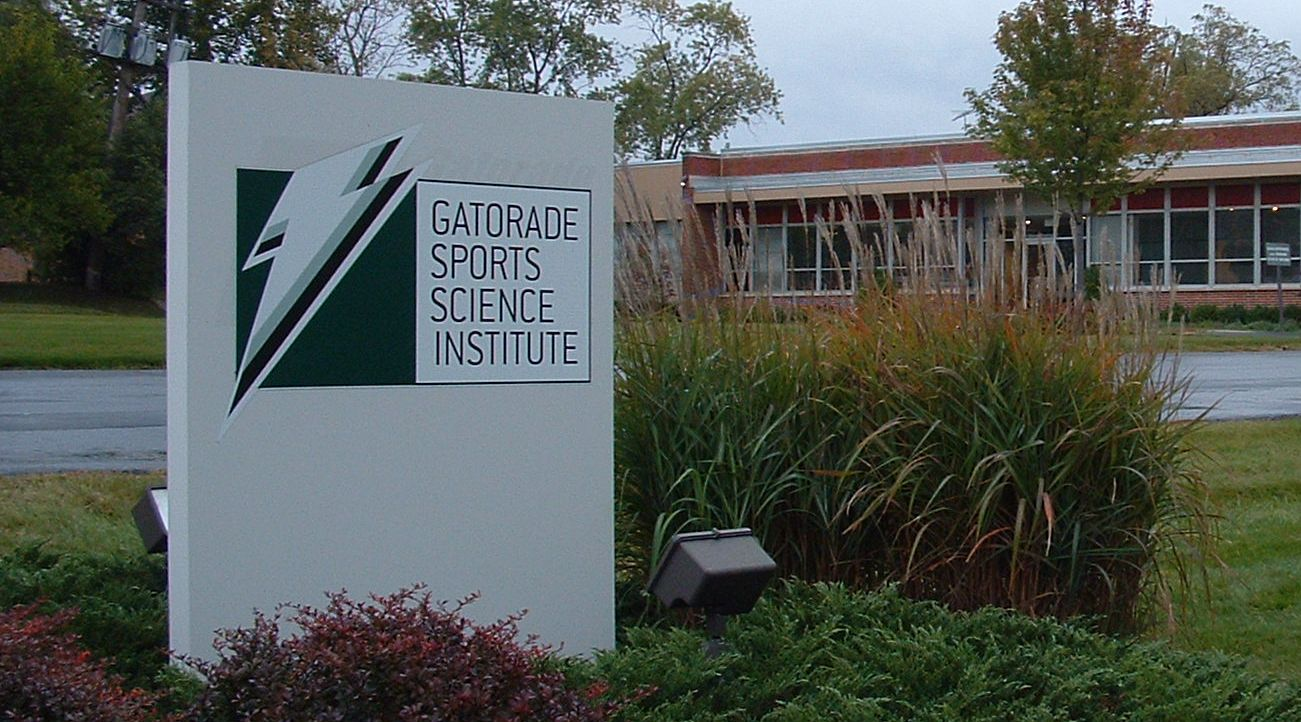
The Gatorade Sports Science Institute on West Main Street in Barrington, Illinois

Gatorade's inventors went on to develop new sports drinks. Gatorade's owners sued to acquire rights to these new products, but they never made them available publicly. First, Shires and Cade developed Go!, a drink that, unlike Gatorade, contained protein to stimulate muscular recovery. Stokely-Van Camp paid "a fee to have the exclusive rights for some period of time, but they never did develop it".

In 1989, Cade created a new sports drink that he claimed was more effective than Gatorade. The new product was called TQ2, shorthand for Thirst Quencher 2. The patent application read:

"The invention described here is a novel fluid composition which surprisingly and advantageously maintains blood volume at levels well above those observed in the absence of fluids or even with Gatorade."

In an experiment with cyclists, Cade found that TQ2 allowed athletes to endure for 30% longer than Gatorade.

Cade pitched the TQ2 product to Pepsi and other beverage companies. Meanwhile, Gatorade's owner Quaker sued Cade. After years of legal proceedings, Cade was forced to sell TQ2 to Quaker in 1993. Quaker "bagged" TQ2, never releasing it to the public. Gatorade claimed that its research found that TQ2 was not an improvement over the original Gatorade formula. Cade, on the other hand, continued to stand by his product. He accused Quaker and Gatorade of stifling the publication of the research behind TQ2.

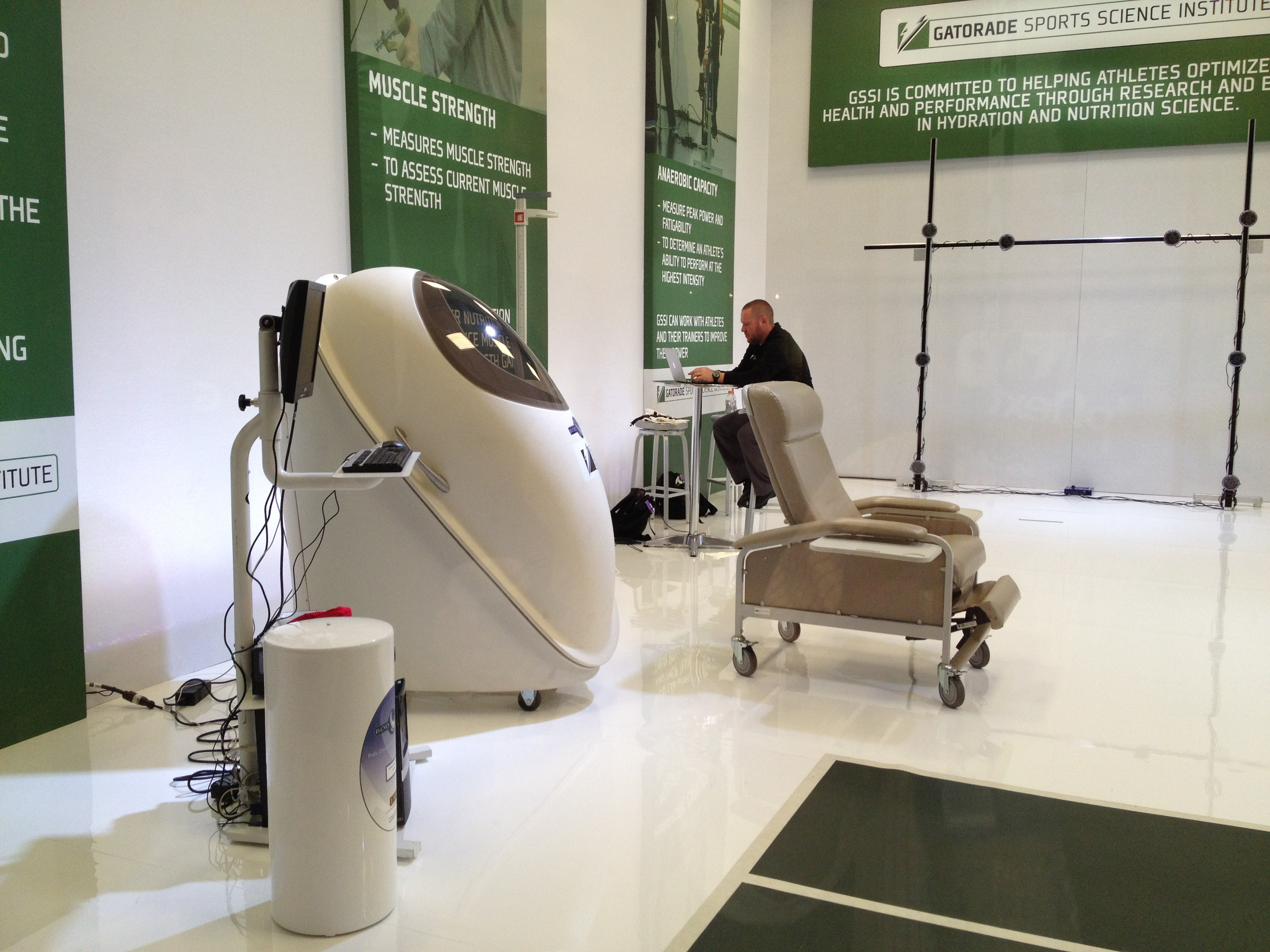
Inside the facility in 2012

The Gatorade Sports Science Institute (GSSI), a research facility operated in Barrington, Illinois, has been featured in a number of the company's commercials. Established in 1985 and closed in 2022, this organization consisted of scientists studying the correlation and effects of exercise, environmental variables, and nutrition on the human body. According to Darren Rovell, "GSSI was created at a time when there was a lot of scientific controversy, since there wasn't much public evidence that Gatorade actually worked...GSSI was also created to be part of Gatorade's powerful marketing arm."

It regularly conducted testing and research on how hydration and nutrition affect athletic performance. Professional athletes such as Eli Manning as well as collegiate and amateur athletes have been involved in fitness testing programs at the GSSI, which in part have led to innovations in new Gatorade formula variations and product lines.

In 2001, the GSSI observed that professional race car drivers were not maintaining adequate levels of hydration during races, attributable to the nature of drivers enduring multiple-hour races in high temperatures. As a result, it developed a product called the "Gatorade In-Car Drinking System", which has since been implemented in the vehicles of many professional race car drivers.

In addition to the former Gatorade Sports Science Institute, Gatorade sponsors external health and fitness research. In 1992, Gatorade paid the American College of Sports Medicine (ACSM) $250,000. A year later, Gatorade and the American College of Sports Medicine held a roundtable meeting on "exercise and fluid replacement". The ACSM published the meeting's results in 1996, advising athletes to drink "at a rate sufficient to replace all the water lost through sweating" or "the maximal amount that can be tolerated". Gatorade continues to sponsor the American College of Sports Medicine, though the exact amount it pays is not public.

== Advertising and publicity ==
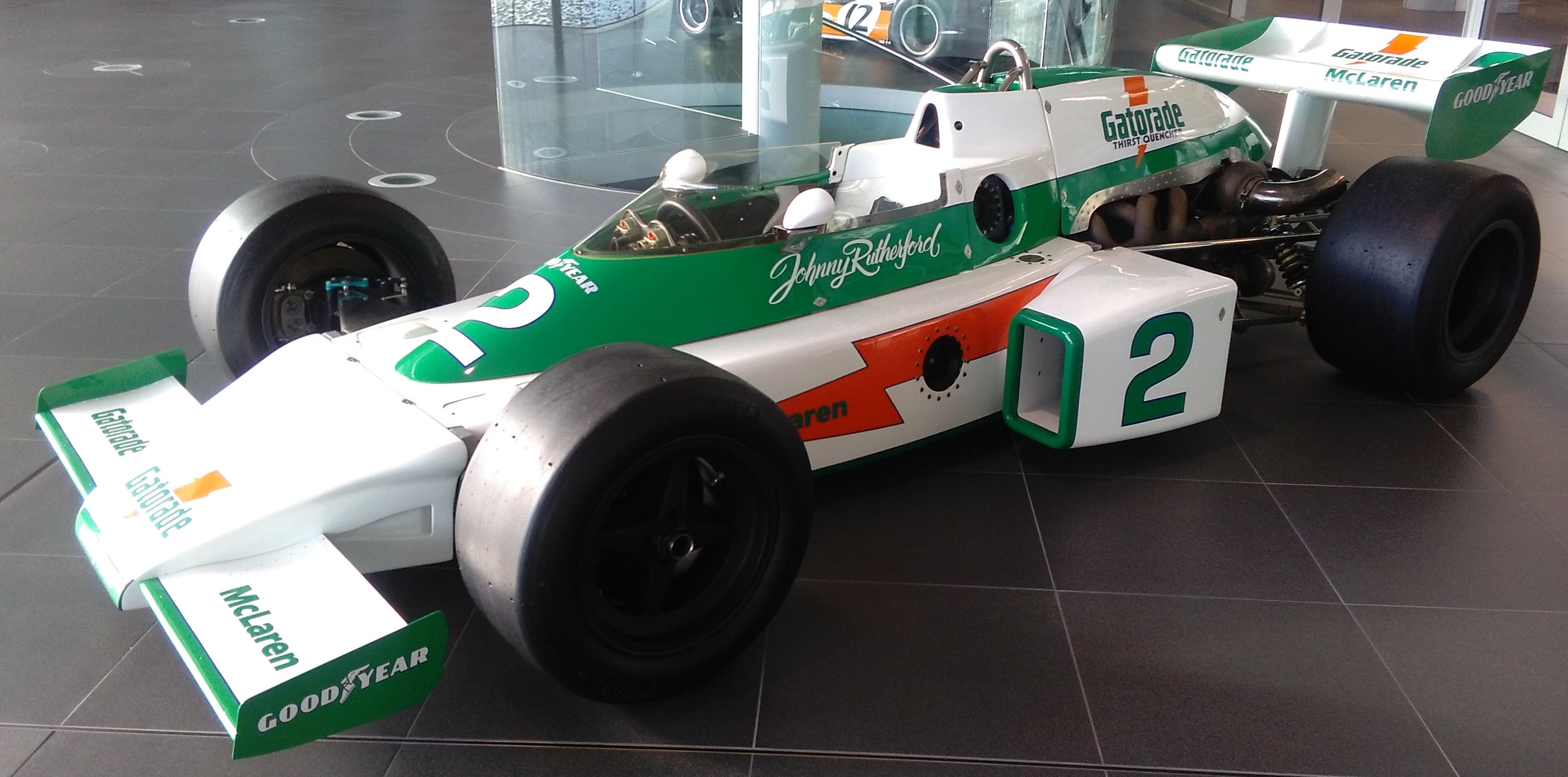
McLaren M16E Indycar driven by Johnny Rutherford in 1975

Early Gatorade advertisements claimed that the drink moved through the body 12 times faster than water. Research found that this was not true - Gatorade moves through the body at the same speed as water. Gatorade removed the claim from its advertisements. Gatorade advertisements have claimed that athletes need to consume at least "40 oz. per hour [1.2 L] or your performance could suffer". South African exercise physiologist Tim Noakes found that Cynthia Lucero died from exercise-associated hyponatremic encephalopathy drinking Gatorade at "the rate recommended by the advertisements".

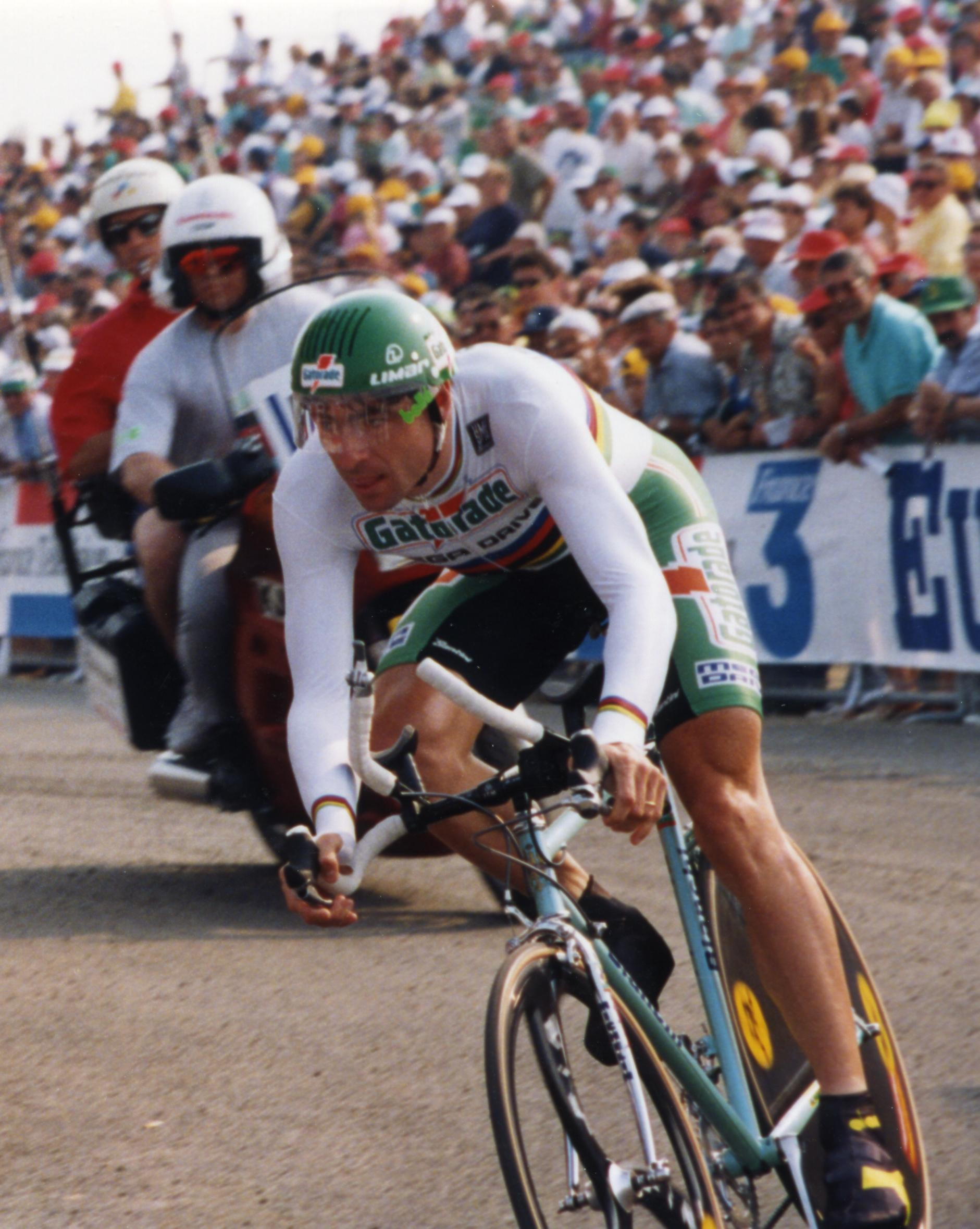
Professional road racing cyclist Gianni Bugno during 1993 Tour de France in Team Gatorade

Gatorade is the official sports drink of the NFL, MLB, NBA, WNBA, USA Basketball, NHL, Association of Volleyball Professionals, Indian Super League, High School Sports Teams, NASCAR, and other professional and collegiate athletic organizations, providing supplies of the drinks to sponsored teams in some cases. Distribution was extended to include the U.K. in 2008, coinciding with an agreement designating Gatorade as the official sports drink of Chelsea F.C. (for outside of the U.S. and Canada) Gatorade's 1991 Be Like Mike ads featured Michael Jordan of the Chicago Bulls, a North American basketball team which had just won its first National Basketball Association championship at the time. The ads began airing in August 1991 and "Be Like Mike" became a household phrase in the United States. In 2015, new versions of the ads were produced to commemorate the brand's 50th anniversary.

The Gatorade brand has continued to employ professional sports athletes in the promotion of its products.

Gatorade also hosts a variety of awards given to high school athletes who excel in their respective sports. One prominent award given is the Gatorade National Football Player of the Year.

== The Gatorade shower ==
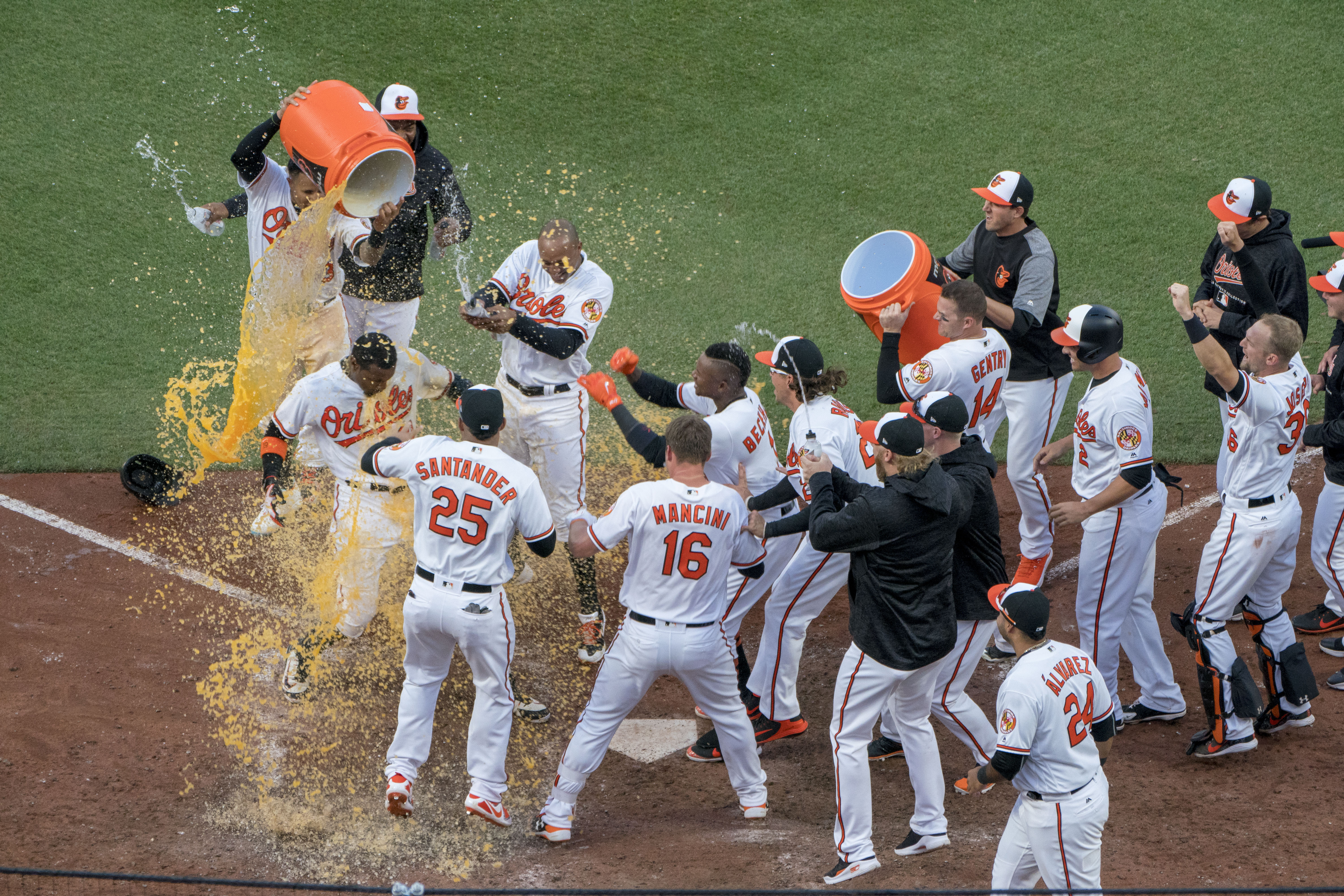
Gatorade shower

The Gatorade shower, originally called the "Gatorade Dunk", is an American sports tradition in which players from a victorious team sneak up behind the head coach with a Gatorade cooler and pour the entire contents (generally Gatorade and ice) over his head at the end of a game.

This tradition was popularized in the mid-1980s when Harry Carson and Jim Burt, of the New York Giants, doused head coach Bill Parcells during the 1985 season. Burt's teammates picked up on this practice and popularized it during the team's championship season of 1986–87. The tradition has since become a recurring tradition across other team sports, including Canadian football.

== Gatorade and oral rehydration ==
Much of the research about the effects of Gatorade and similar products is funded by Gatorade, which critics regard as a possible conflict of interests. A meta analysis found fully industry-funded studies tend to find more favorable results than non-industry funded research.

In the aftermath of the 1994 Rwandan genocide, aid agencies were struggling to save the lives of thousands of Rwandan refugees dying of dehydration due to cholera in camps in eastern Zaire. The aid agency AmeriCares was criticized for choosing to provide Gatorade as a form of oral rehydration solution. Edward Bonner in The New York Times stated:

But while Gatorade might be good for athletes, it is not good for cholera, said Dr. Michael Toole, an epidemiologist at the Centers for Disease Control. Gatorade does not have all the essential ingredients that an I.V. has, and people who were given it might have taken more appropriate solutions, Dr. Toole said.

AmeriCares' president responded: "We stand by our decision to ship Gatorade to Rwandan refugees. In the absence of potable water, Gatorade, with its electrolytes and water, saved countless lives in a true triage situation."

== See also ==
- Gatorade Center
- Gatorwine
- MuscleMilk
