= Robert Cade =

American medical doctor, nephrologist, research scientist, inventor of Gatorade

- Cade in the 1960s
- Born: September 26, 1927; San Antonio, Texas, U.S.
- Died: November 27, 2007 (aged 80); Gainesville, Florida, U.S.
- Education: University of Texas at Austin (BS); University of Texas Southwestern Medical School (MD)
- Occupations: Physician; professor; scientist; inventor
- Known for: Invention of Gatorade
- Spouse: Mary Strasburger
- Children: Michael, Stephen, Martha, Celia, Emily & Phoebe
- Scientific career
- Fields: Medicine; Nephrology
- Workplaces: University of Florida

James Robert Cade (September 26, 1927 – November 27, 2007) was an American physician, university professor, research scientist and inventor. Cade, a native of Texas, earned his bachelor and medical degrees at the University of Texas, and became a professor of medicine and nephrology at the University of Florida. Although Cade engaged in many areas of medical research, he is most widely remembered as the leader of the research team that created the sports drink Gatorade. Gatorade went on to have significant medical applications for treating dehydration in patients, and has generated over $500 million in royalties for the university.

In his later years, Cade became a prominent philanthropist, donating significant sums to charities affiliated with the Lutheran Church, creating scholarships and donating freely to the University of Florida and other colleges and universities, and endowing his own charitable foundations. He established the Cade Museum for Creativity and Invention in Gainesville, Florida.

== Early life and education ==
Robert Cade was born in San Antonio, Texas, on September 26, 1927. He was a fourth-generation Texan. Cade took an early interest in athletics and ran the mile in four minutes, twenty seconds at Brackenridge High School, a very respectable time for a high school athlete in the early 1940s. He graduated from Brackenridge High School in May 1945 and joined the U.S. Navy. He served for three years and was stationed at Naval Medical Research Unit Four in Dublin, Georgia (1 year), the destroyer USS Gherardi (1 1/2 years) and the cruiser USS Rochester. He completed his service in September 1948 with the rank of pharmacist's mate third class.

After being discharged from the navy, he enrolled in the University of Texas. He completed four years of undergraduate coursework in two calendar years, and graduated with his bachelor's degree in 1950. He was also a member of the Delta Upsilon fraternity while at the University of Texas. In 1953, he married Mary Strasburger, a nurse from Dallas, Texas, whom he had met while he was in medical school. After graduating with his doctor of medicine degree from the University of Texas Southwestern Medical School in Dallas in 1954, Cade completed his internship at the Saint Louis City Hospital in Saint Louis, Missouri and did his residency at Parkland Memorial Hospital in Dallas. He also served fellowships at his alma mater, Southwestern Medical School, and Cornell University Medical College in New York City. In 1961, Cade joined the faculty of the University of Florida College of Medicine in Gainesville, Florida, as an assistant professor of internal medicine in its renal division.

== Invention of Gatorade ==
In 1965, Cade was approached by Dewayne Douglas, an assistant coach for the Florida Gators football team, about the extreme dehydration faced by Gator football players practicing in the high temperatures and humidity of the Deep South in late summer and early fall. Douglas questioned Cade why his football players did not urinate during practice and games. Cade learned from anecdotal evidence that football players were losing water through perspiration and failing to replace fluid during practice and games. Cade's research team discovered that football players were losing up to 18 pounds (8.2 kilograms) during the three hours of a college football game, and that ninety to ninety-five percent of that loss was water. A player's plasma volume could decrease as much as seven percent and blood volume by five percent, and sodium and chloride were excreted in the sweat.

During 1965 and 1966, Cade, together with his team of research doctors Dana Shires, James Free, and Alejandro M. de Quesada, conducted a series of trial-and-error experiments with his glucose-and-electrolytes rehydration drink on members of the Gators football team of coach Ray Graves, first with members of the freshman squad, and after initially promising results, with starting members of the varsity team. "It didn't taste like Gatorade," Cade said in a 1988 interview with Florida Trend magazine. In fact, according to Cade, when Gators lineman Larry Gagner first tried it, he spat it out and strongly suggested that the original experimental formula tasted more like bodily waste. Dana Shires remembered that "it sort of tasted like toilet bowl cleaner." To make it more palatable, at the suggestion of Cade's wife, the researchers added lemon juice and cyclamate to the original formula of water, salt, sodium citrate, fructose and monopotassium phosphate.

Cade appeared in "The Legend of Gatorade" television commercials narrated by long-time college football announcer Keith Jackson in 2005, during which Cade declared, "Naturally, we called our stuff Gatorade." However, the rehydration drink was first known as "Cade's Ade" and "Cade's Cola" to the Florida Gators football team, and only later became known as "Gatorade." The drink received its first real test in the Gators' 1965 game against the LSU Tigers football team; the Tigers faded in the 102 °F (39 °C) heat of the second half and the Gators did not. Coach Graves was convinced, and asked Cade to produce enough of his potion for all Gator games. Gatorade achieved national prominence as a result of the Gators' first Orange Bowl title over the Georgia Tech Yellow Jackets in January 1967. The Gators reinforced their reputation as a "second-half team" and came from behind to defeat the Yellow Jackets 27–10. Afterward, Georgia Tech head coach Bobby Dodd told reporters: "We didn't have Gatorade; that made the difference."

Cade patented the formula and offered all the rights to the drink to the University of Florida in exchange for the university's backing of the production and marketing of the drink, but the university turned down his proposal. He initially obtained bank financing and began to produce "Gatorade" through his own business, but later entered into a contract with Stokely-Van Camp, Inc. to produce and sell the drink. When sales royalties reached $200,000, the university took notice. The Florida Board of Regents, prompted by the U.S. Department of Health, Education and Welfare, which had provided Cade with a small grant for his research, asked for the patent rights. Cade refused. The Board of Regents, acting on behalf of the university, then brought suit against Cade for a share of the profits, arguing that the university's facilities, employees and students were instrumental in the development of the product. After thirty-one months of legal wrangling, Cade and the university negotiated a settlement of their dispute in 1972, and the Board of Regents and the university settled for a twenty percent share of the royalties. Cade, and his investors in the Gatorade Trust, retained eighty percent. In the aftermath of the settlement, Cade and the university resolved their differences amicably, and expanded their professional relationships—of the first $70,500 in Gatorade royalties received by the university, the university reinvested $30,000 in kidney research by Cade's renal department and another $12,000 in Cade's other research projects. Cade, for his part, created multiple scholarships and contributed generously to the university from his own royalties over the following years.

== Legacy ==
Up to 2007, the University of Florida has received over $150 million from its share of the Gatorade royalties. As of 2015, this total has increased to $281 million. Cade and his associates' share of the royalties is undisclosed, the majority of their rights having been sold to Stokely-Van Camp. After the settlement, Cade continued to work for the university, and the college of medicine named him professor emeritus of nephrology upon his retirement in 2004. In April 2007, several months before his death, the University Athletic Association inducted Cade into the University of Florida Athletic Hall of Fame as an "honorary letter winner."

Gatorade, now owned by PepsiCo, is today sold in some eighty countries and over fifty various flavors. In contrast to the forty-three dollars that Cade and his team spent to make the first experimental batch of Gatorade in 1965, Gatorade prompted the evolution of a multibillion-dollar sports drink industry in the years that followed; as of 2007, over seven billion bottles of Gatorade were being sold annually in the United States. While he was surprised by its commercial success as a sports drink, Cade took greater pride in Gatorade's use in hospitals, in post-operative recovery and to treat diarrhea-related dehydration in infants and young children. Cade's other research included hypertension, exercise physiology, autism, schizophrenia and kidney disease. His research into carbo-loading substantiated the early claims of Swedish researchers, and he also invented a hydraulic football helmet that substantially reduced the risk of concussion to football players.

The Cade Museum Foundation, established in 2004 and chaired by Cade's daughter, Phoebe Cade Miles, announced in 2010 that it had begun raising funds to construct a new building for the Cade Museum for Creativity and Invention in Gainesville, with a groundbreaking planned for 2015. The museum opened in May 2018.

On September 26, 2013, Florida Governor Rick Scott posthumously honored Cade as a "Great Floridian" during a ceremony at the Cade Museum. The award honors those people who made "major contributions to the progress and welfare" of Florida.

== Personal life ==
Cade was an active, lifelong member of the Lutheran church, and he was recognized by the church with its Wittenberg Award in 1991. He gave generously to many Lutheran colleges and organizations. In their later years, Cade and his wife established the Gloria Dei Foundation, an organization that makes grants to aid the "poor and underserved."

Cade was a talented violinist who sometimes played with local symphony orchestras. Cade acquired collections of more than thirty violins and more than sixty vintage Studebaker automobiles. He and his wife continued to live in the same Gainesville house that they owned before the financial success of Gatorade. On November 27, 2007, Cade died of kidney failure, at the age of 80, in Gainesville. He was survived by his wife Mary, their six children, twenty grandchildren and eight great-grandchildren.

== See also ==
- Florida Gators
- Florida Gators football, 1960–1969
- History of the University of Florida
- List of Delta Upsilon alumni
- List of University of Florida faculty and administrators
- List of University of Florida Athletic Hall of Fame members
- List of University of Texas at Austin alumni
- University of Florida Health Science Center
