= Glycerol ester of wood rosin =

Names
- Other names Glycerol ester of rosin; Glyceryl abietate; Ester gum; Resin acids and rosin acids, esters with glycerol

Identifiers
CAS Number	8050-31-5
ECHA InfoCard	100.029.524
EC Number	232-482-5
E number	E445 (thickeners, ...)
UNII	SD112V492J
CompTox Dashboard (EPA)	DTXSID7027706

Properties
Appearance	Yellow solid
Melting point	62–87 °C (144–189 °F; 335–360 K)
Solubility in water	Insoluble
- Except where otherwise noted, data are given for materials in their standard state (at 25 °C [77 °F], 100 kPa). Infobox references

Glycerol ester of wood rosin (GEWR), also known as glyceryl abietate, gum rosin or ester gum, is an oil-soluble food additive (E number E445). The food-grade material is used in foods, beverages, and cosmetics to keep oils in suspension in water, and its name may be shortened in the ingredient list as glycerol ester of rosin. It is also used as an ingredient in the production of chewing gum and ice cream.

To make the glycerol ester of wood rosin, refined wood rosin (for example, from solvent extraction of aged pine stumps) is reacted with glycerin to produce the glycerol ester.

Glycerol ester of wood rosin is an alternative to brominated vegetable oil in citrus oil-flavored soft drinks. In some cases, both ingredients are used together.
