= Brominated vegetable oil =

Soft drink additive

Brominated vegetable oil (BVO) is a complex mixture of plant-derived triglycerides that have been modified by atoms of the element bromine bonded to the fat molecules. Brominated vegetable oil has been used to help emulsify citrus-flavored beverages, especially soft drinks, preventing them from separating during distribution. Brominated vegetable oil has been used by the soft drink industry since 1931, generally at a level of about 8 ppm. Several countries have banned use of BVO in food and drink products because of the potential for adverse health effects in humans.

== Use ==
Careful control of the type of oil used allows bromination of it to produce BVO with a specific density of 1.33 g/mL, which is 33% greater than water (1 g/mL). As a result, it can be mixed with less-dense flavoring agents such as citrus oil to produce an oil which matches the density of water or other products. The droplets containing BVO remain suspended in the water rather than separating and floating to the surface.

Alternative food additives used for the same purpose include sucrose acetate isobutyrate (SAIB, E444) and glycerol ester of wood rosin (ester gum, E445).

Similar iodinated oils have been used as contrast agents and for goiter prophylaxis in populations with low dietary iodine intake.

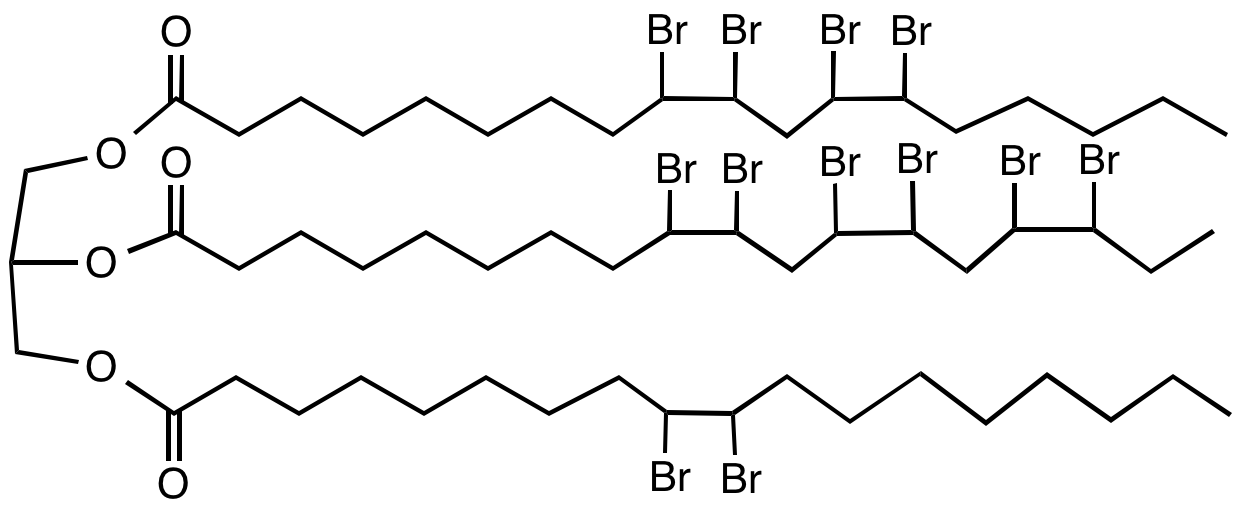
Chemical structure of a representative constituent of BVO, featuring, from the top, brominated linoleate, linolenoate, and oleate esters.

Brominated vegetable oil has the CAS number 8016-94-2 and the EC number 232-416-5.

== Regulation ==
=== United States ===
In the United States, BVO was designated in 1958 as generally recognized as safe (GRAS), but this was withdrawn by the U.S. Food and Drug Administration (FDA) in 1970. The U.S. Code of Federal Regulations imposed restrictions on the use of BVO as a food additive in the United States, limiting the concentration to 15 ppm, the amount of free fatty acids to 2.5%, and the iodine value to 16.

BVO was one of four substances that the FDA has defined as "interim" food additives; the other three were acrylonitrile copolymers, mannitol, and saccharin.

An online petition at Change.org asking PepsiCo to stop adding BVO to Gatorade and other products collected over 200,000 signatures by January 2013. The petition pointed out that since Gatorade is sold in countries where BVO is not approved, there was already an existing formulation without this ingredient. PepsiCo announced in January 2013 that it would no longer use BVO in Gatorade. On May 5, 2014, Coca-Cola and PepsiCo said they would remove BVO from their products.

In October 2023, California Governor Gavin Newsom approved a law that would ban the manufacture, sale, and distribution of brominated vegetable oil, along with three other additives (potassium bromate, propylparaben, and Red 3), becoming the first state to ban food additives that were otherwise approved by the FDA.

In July 2024, the FDA revoked regulations allowing the use of BVO in food, following a proposal made in November 2023. The agency concluded that the intended use of BVO in food is no longer considered safe after the results of studies conducted in collaboration with the National Institutes of Health (NIH) found the potential for adverse health effects in humans, including headaches and nervous system damage. The final rule banning BVO took effect August 2, 2024, and beverage companies have one year to reformulate their products to comply with the final rule.

=== Other countries ===
Canada has banned the use of brominated vegetable oil since August 30, 2024. The decision follows a proposal made in May 2024 citing mounting health concerns. This additive was previously permitted in drinks with a limit of 15 ppm in beverages with citrus or spruce oils. Beverage companies have one year from that date to reformulate and relabel any affected products.

In the European Union, BVO has been banned from use since 2008 (it was originally banned in the UK and several other European countries in 1970). Any BVO-containing products that may slip through the regulations are pulled from shelves upon discovery. In the EU, beverage companies commonly use glycerol ester of wood rosin or locust bean gum as an alternative to BVO.

In India, standards for soft drinks have prohibited the use of BVO since 1990.

In Japan, the use of BVO as a food additive has been banned since 2010.

== Health effects ==
There are case reports of adverse effects associated with excessive consumption of BVO-containing products. One case reported that a man who consumed two to four liters of a soda containing BVO on a daily basis experienced memory loss, tremors, fatigue, loss of muscle coordination, headache, and ptosis of the right eyelid, as well as elevated serum chloride. In the two months it took to correctly diagnose the problem, the patient also lost the ability to walk. Eventually, bromism was diagnosed and hemodialysis was prescribed which resulted in a reversal of the disorder.
