= Sucrose acetate isobutyrate =

Names
- IUPAC name 1-O-Acetyl-3,4,6-tris-O-[(2-methylpropanoyl)oxy]-β-D-fructofuranosyl α-D-glucopyranoside 6-acetate 2,3,4-tris(2-methylpropanoate)
- Systematic IUPAC name (2R,3R,4S,5R,6R)-2-[(Acetyloxy)methyl]-6-{[(2S,3S,4R,5R)-2-[(acetyloxy)methyl]-3,4-bis[(2-methylpropanoyl)oxy]-5-{[(2-methylpropanoyl)oxy]methyl}oxolan-2-yl]oxy}oxane-3,4,5-triyl tris(2-methylpropanoate)
- Other names Sucrose acetoisobutyrate Sucrose diacetate hexaisobutyrate HSDB 5657; AI3-25354; E444

Identifiers
CAS Number	27216-37-1
3D model (JSmol)	Interactive image
Abbreviations	SAIB
ChEBI	CHEBI:177717
ChemSpider	29072
ECHA InfoCard	100.004.338
EC Number	204-771-6
E number	E444 (thickeners, ...)
PubChem CID	31339
UNII	H5KI1C3YTV
CompTox Dashboard (EPA)	DTXSID3027035
- InChI: InChI=1S/C40H62O19/c1-18(2)33(43)50-16-27-29(54-35(45)20(5)6)32(57-38(48)23(11)12)40(58-27,17-51-25(14)42)59-39-31(56-37(47)22(9)10)30(55-36(46)21(7)8)28(53-34(44)19(3)4)26(52-39)15-49-24(13)41/h18-23,26-32,39H,15-17H2,1-14H3/t26-,27-,28-,29-,30+,31-,32+,39-,40+/m1/s1 Key: UVGUPMLLGBCFEJ-SWTLDUCYSA-N
- SMILES: CC(C)C(=O)OC[C@@H]1[C@H]([C@@H]([C@](O1)(COC(=O)C)O[C@@H]2[C@@H]([C@H]([C@@H]([C@H](O2)COC(=O)C)OC(=O)C(C)C)OC(=O)C(C)C)OC(=O)C(C)C)OC(=O)C(C)C)OC(=O)C(C)C

Properties
Chemical formula	C_{40}H_{62}O_{19}
Molar mass	846.917 g·mol^{−1}
- Except where otherwise noted, data are given for materials in their standard state (at 25 °C [77 °F], 100 kPa). verify (what is ?) Infobox references

Sucrose acetoisobutyrate (SAIB) is an emulsifier and has E number E444. In the United States, SAIB is categorized as generally recognized as safe (GRAS) as a food additive in cocktail mixers, beer, malt beverages, or wine coolers and is a potential replacement for brominated vegetable oil.

== Chemistry ==
SAIB can be prepared by esterification of sucrose with acetic and isobutyric anhydride.

== Uses ==
- Beverage emulsions - weighting agent
- Color cosmetics and skin care
- Flavorings (orange flavor)
- Fragrance fixative
- Hair care
- Horse styling products
