= List of syrups =

This is a list of notable syrups. In cooking, a syrup is a condiment that is a thick, viscous liquid consisting primarily of a solution of sugar in water, containing a large amount of dissolved sugars but showing little tendency to deposit crystals. Its consistency is similar to that of molasses. The viscosity arises from the hydrogen bonds between the dissolved sugar, which has many hydroxyl (OH) groups, and the water.

== Syrups ==
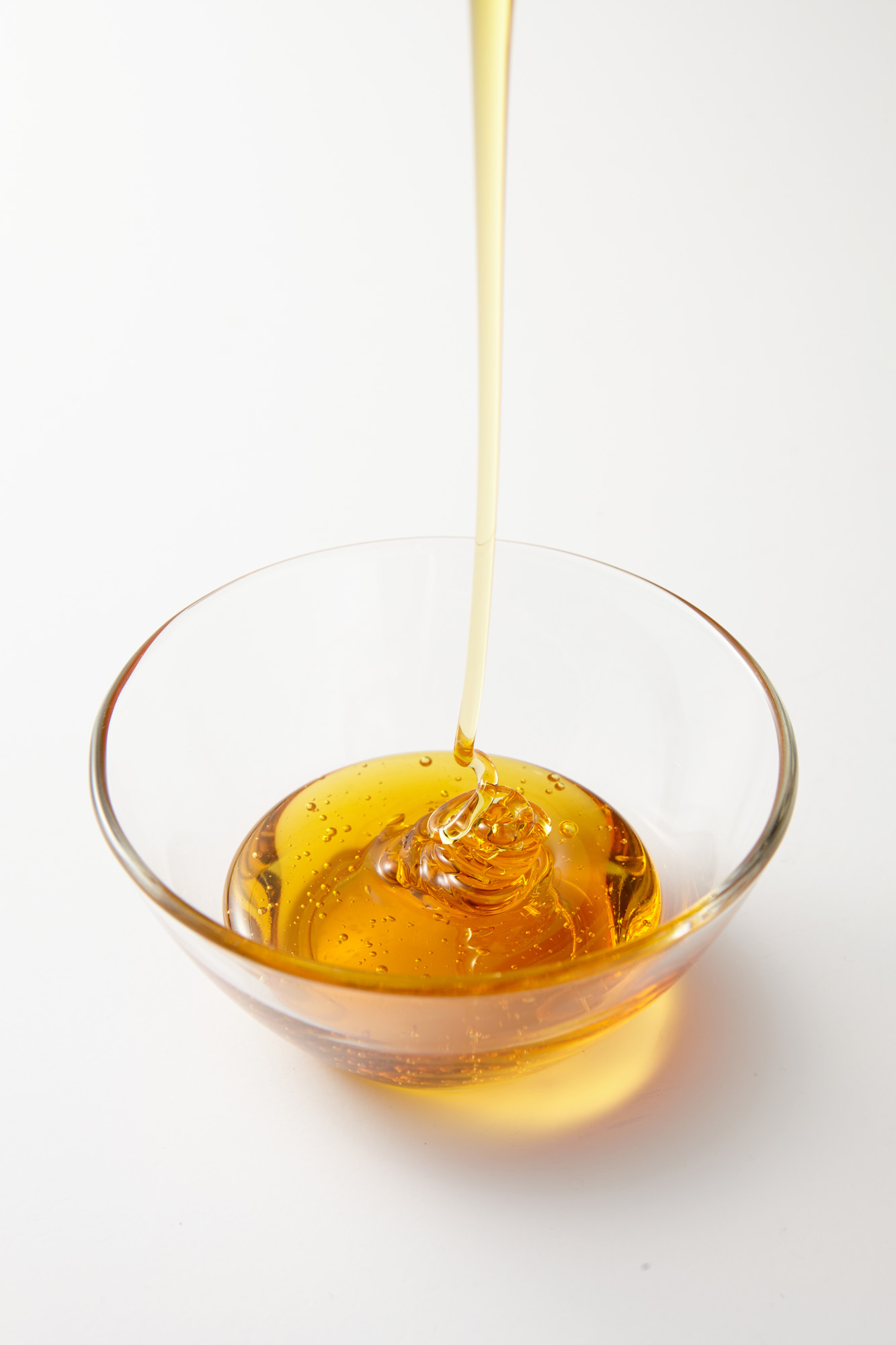
Cheong

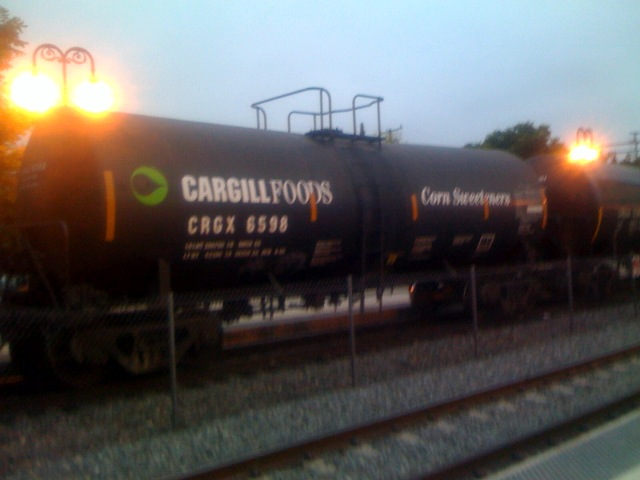
A railroad tank car carrying a load of corn syrup

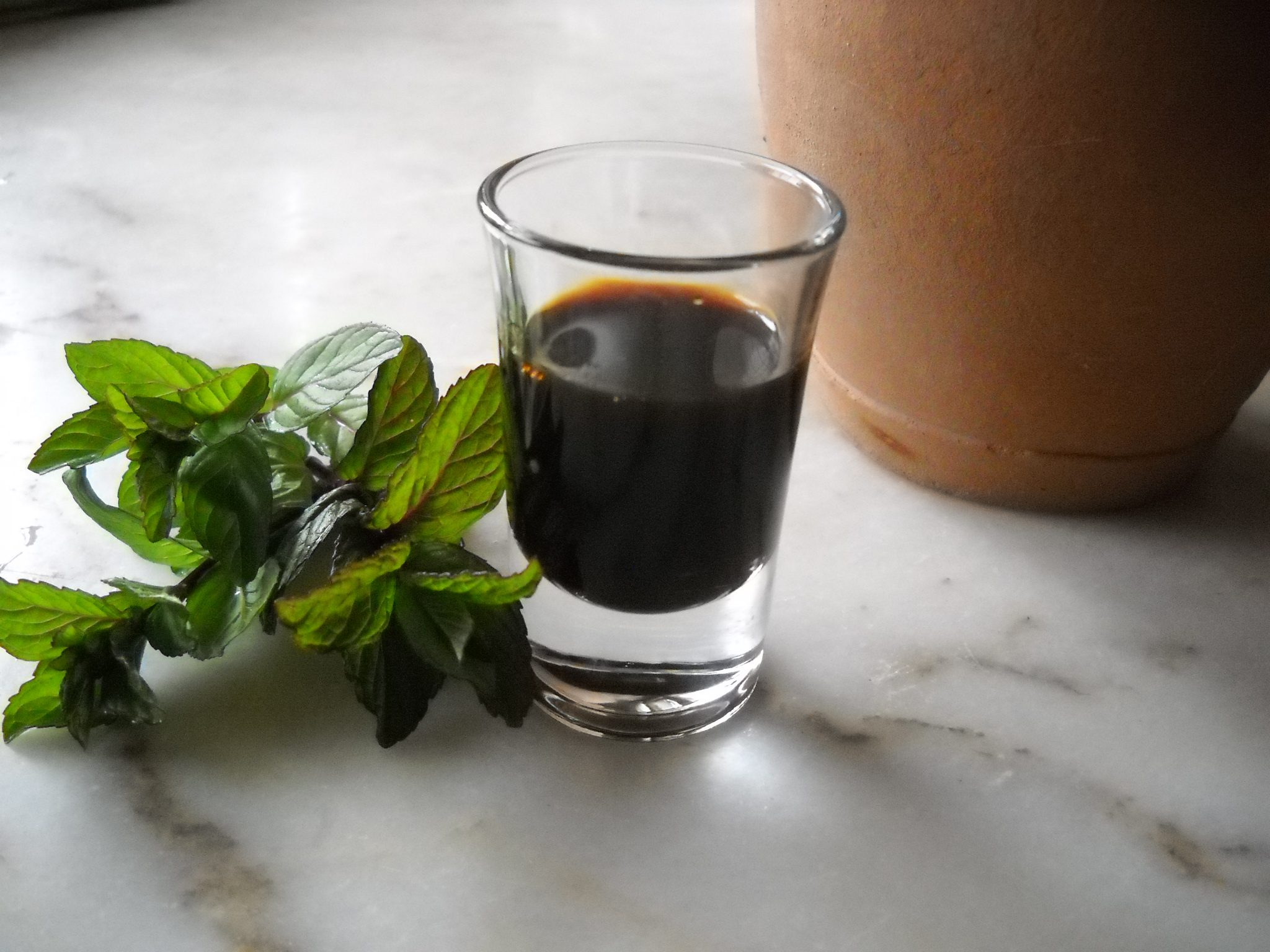
Pekmez (Üzüm Pekmezi) is a Turkish syrup made of grapes (grape syrup) or of carob (Keçiboynuzu Pekmezi).

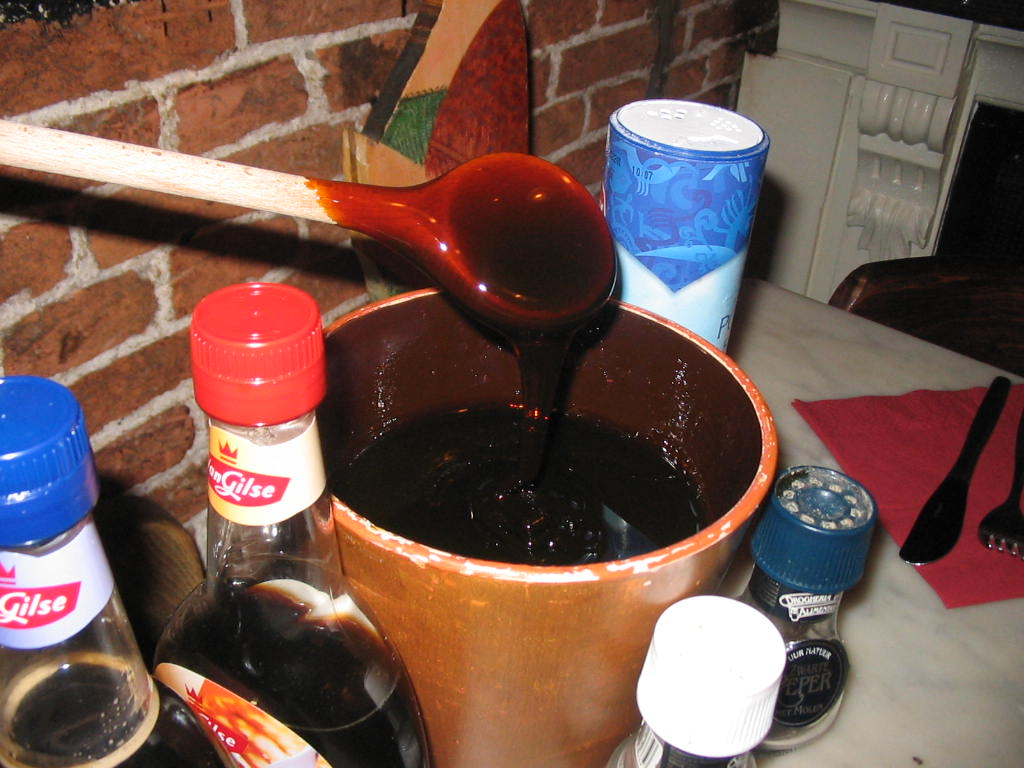
Treacle

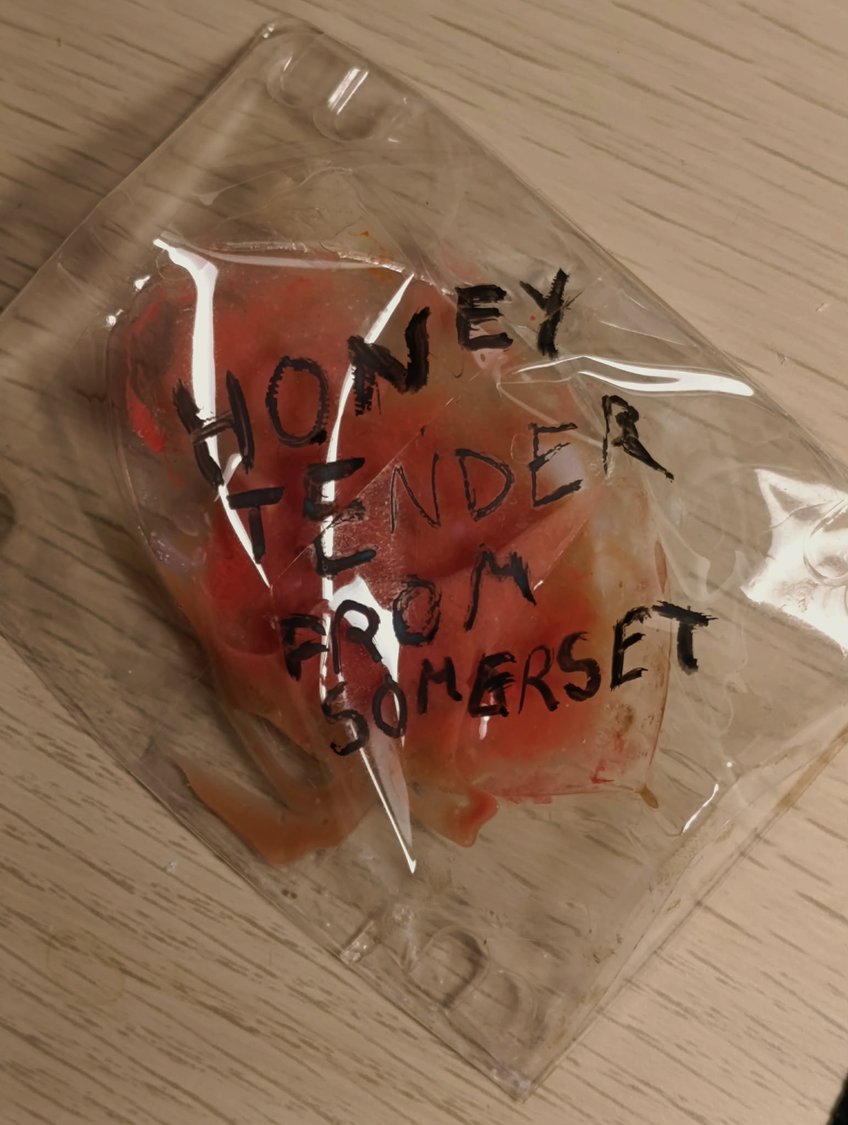
A small vial of sugar beet syrup from Somerset.

- Acetomel – a syrup made from honey and vinegar with a sweet and sour taste
- Agave syrup – a sweetener commercially produced from several species of agave
- Attar – a type of sweet syrup used in the preparation of Middle Eastern desserts
- Barley malt syrup – an unrefined sweetener processed by extraction from sprouted, i.e., malted, barley, containing approximately 65 percent maltose, 30 percent complex carbohydrate, 3% protein
- Birch syrup – a savory mineral-tasting syrup made from the sap of birch trees and produced in much the same way as maple syrup
- Bludwine – brand of flavored syrups that were used in soft drinks
- Brown rice syrup – derived by culturing cooked rice starch
- Cane syrup – made from stalks of sugarcane
- Chashni – the generic name in North Indian, Pakistani, Nepali and Afghan languages for a sugary syrup
- Cheong – a name for various sweetened foods in Korean cuisine in the form of syrups, marmalades, and fruit preserves
- Cherry Smash – a fountain syrup made from cherry syrup along with a blend of other fruit flavors which soda jerks mixed with carbonated water and phosphate.
- Chocolate syrup
- Cider syrup – is also known as apple molasses, a kind of fruit syrup
- Cocopandan syrup – made from coconut syrup and pandan juice
- Corn syrup – made from the starch of corn (called maize in some countries) and contains varying amounts of maltose and higher oligosaccharides, depending on the grade
- High-fructose corn syrup
- High-maltose corn syrup
- Date honey – a thick dark brown, very sweet, fruit syrup extracted from dates
- Evaporated cane juice – the US Food and Drug Administration (FDA) defines evaporated cane juice as any sweetener derived from sugarcane syrup. The US FDA considers the term "evaporated cane juice" to be misleading because the term incorrectly suggests that it is a juice, when it is sugar syrup. Instead, the US FDA recommends using "sugar cane syrup" or "dried cane syrup" on food labels.
- Falernum – a syrup liqueur from the Caribbean, best known for its use in tropical drinks
- Flavored syrup – typically consists of a simple syrup (sugar fully mixed with water while heated), with naturally occurring or artificial flavorings also dissolved in the syrup.
- Fruit syrup – concentrated fruit juices used as sweeteners
- Glucose syrup – also known as confectioner's glucose, made from the hydrolysis of starch
- Golden syrup – or light treacle (also known as "Refiner's Syrup"), is a thick amber-colored form of inverted sugar syrup made in the process of refining sugar cane or sugar beet juice into sugar.
- Gomme syrup, or gum syrup – sugar syrup thickened with gum arabic, but some recipes are plain sugar syrup with no gum
- Grape syrup – a condiment made with concentrated grape juice
- Grenadine – a commonly used, non-alcoholic bar syrup, characterized by a flavor that is both tart and sweet, and by a deep red color.
- Inverted sugar syrup – (also called invert syrup) is an edible mixture of two simple sugars – glucose and fructose – that is made by heating sucrose (table sugar) with water and acid.
- Kuromitsu – a Japanese sugar syrup, literally "black honey", it is similar to molasses, but thinner and milder
- Syrup of Maidenhair – a syrup made from adiantum (maidenhair fern)
- Maple syrup – usually made from the xylem sap of sugar maple, red maple, or black maple trees, although it can also be made from other maple species.
- Mizuame – a Japanese glucose syrup of subtle flavor, traditionally made from rice and malt.
- Molasses – a thick, sweet syrup made from boiling sugar cane.
- Orgeat syrup – a sweet syrup made from almonds, sugar, and rose water or orange flower water
- Oleo saccharum – A syrup made from the oil of citrus peels.
- Palm syrup – an edible sweet syrup produced from the sap of a number of palms, it is produced in the Canary Islands and coastal regions of South America.
- Rose syrup – made from rose water with added sugar
- Squash – a non-alcoholic concentrated syrup used in beverage making
- Sugar beet syrup – "The beet-root, when being boiled, yields a juice similar to syrup of sugar, which is beautiful to look at on account of its vermilion color" (1575). This was written by 16th-century scientist, Olivier de Serres, who discovered a process for preparing sugar syrup from the common red beet. It is also known as phut in Poland and honey tender in Somerset.
- Sweet sorghum – Sweet sorghum has been widely cultivated in the U.S. since the 1850s for use in sweeteners, primarily in the form of sorghum syrup
- Treacle – any uncrystallized syrup made during the refining of sugar
- Vincotto – in Salento, in the heel of Italy, vincotto is produced from the slow reduction together of a blend of cooked grape must and of a wine that has started to spoil and sour attaining the consistency of dense non-alcoholic syrup. This tradition goes back to the times of the ancient Romans.
- Yacón syrup – a sweetening agent extracted from the tuberous roots of the yacón plant (Smallanthus sonchifolius) indigenous to the Andes mountains.
- Yeot – a variety of hangwa, Korean traditional confectionery, it can be made in either liquid or solid form, as a syrup, taffy, or candy.

=== Syrup brands ===
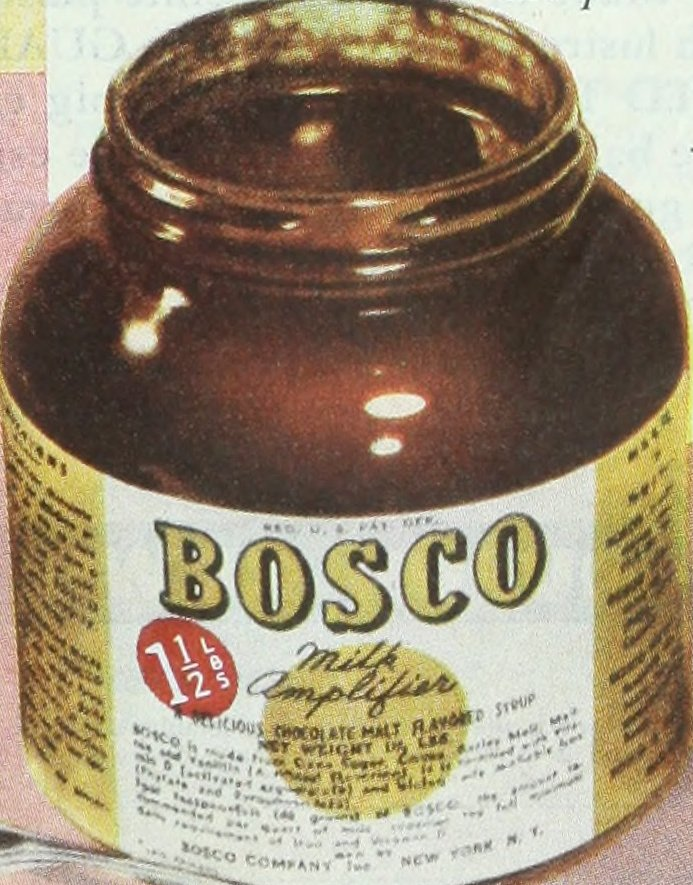
A jar of Bosco Chocolate Syrup

- ALAGA Syrup - American brand of cane syrup that has been produced, bottled, and packaged in Montgomery, Alabama, since 1906.
- Amoretti – American brand with around 100 flavors as of 2020.
- Aunt Jemima, rebranded to "Pearl Milling Company" – an American brand of pancake mix, syrup, and other breakfast foods owned by the Quaker Oats Company.
- Bosco Chocolate Syrup – a brand of chocolate syrup sold in the United States and Europe.
- DaVinci – American brand with 40 flavors (as of 2022). A brand of Kerry Group.
- Fox's U-bet chocolate syrup – an American brand of commercial chocolate syrup.
- Golden Eagle syrup, American brand of syrup made from corn syrup, cane sugar, molasses, and honey
- The Hershey Company
- Karo – brand owned by ACH Food Companies, Inc. (subsidiary of Associated British Foods)
- Liber & Co. – American brand founded in 2011 with 14 flavors as of 2020.
- Log Cabin syrup – an American brand of pre-packaged syrups owned by Pinnacle Foods.
- Mrs. Butterworth's – an American brand of syrups and pancake mixes.
- William Fox – British brand currently with 68 flavors.
- Monin – French brand currently with 123 flavors.
- Nesquik chocolate syrup for flavored milk – introduced in 1981.
- Small Hands Food American brand currently with 8 flavors.
- Sonoma Syrup Co. – American brand currently with 16 flavors.
- Steen's cane syrup – an American brand made in Louisiana and an essential ingredient in Cajun/Creole cuisine
- Torani – Italian/American brand of R. Torre & Company, Inc., currently with 150 flavors.
- Tate & Lyle – UK brand of sugars and syrups distributed world-wide.
- Vermont Maid – an American brand of syrup created in 1919 and owned by B&G Foods since 1997.
- Watson Says - a global brand that offers a diverse portfolio of premium syrups, sauces, concentrates, and fruit mixes produced by the Agrana group.

== See also ==
- Honey
- List of condiments
- List of sauces
- List of spreads
- Neera
- Cough syrup – a form of cold medicine
- Public relations of high fructose corn syrup
