= Flavored syrup =

Sugar syrup with added flavorings

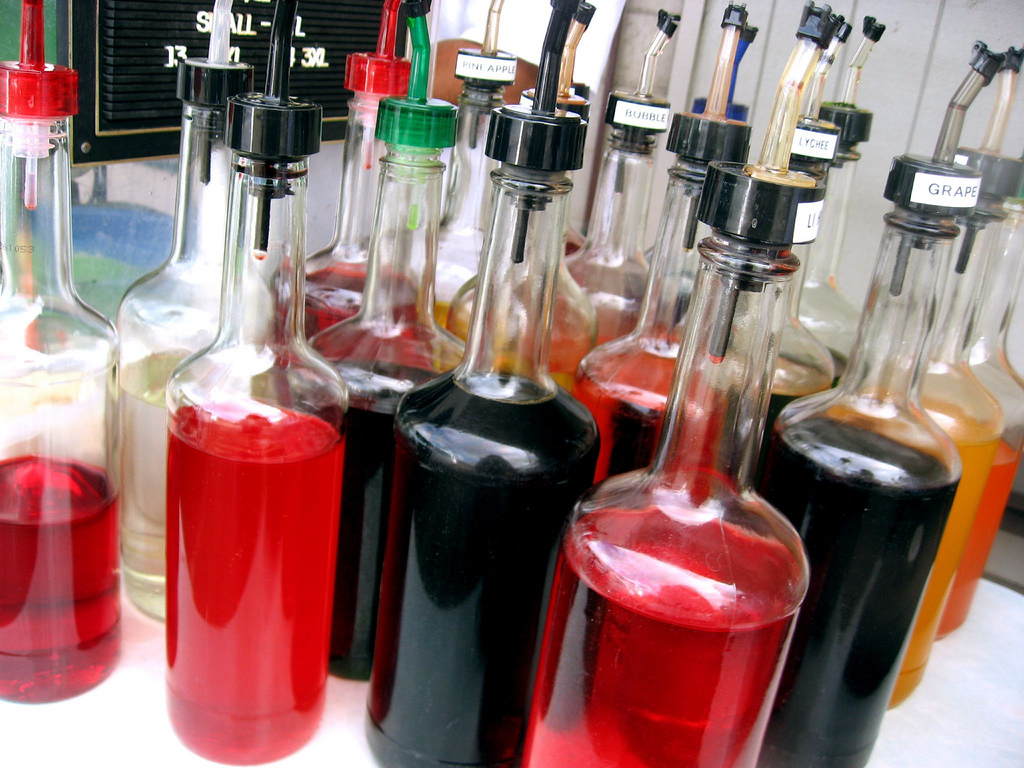
Syrups used for flavoring shaved ice

Flavored syrups typically consist of a simple syrup, that is sugar (fully mixed with water while heated), with naturally occurring or artificial (synthesized) flavorings also dissolved in them. A sugar substitute may also be used.

Flavored syrups may be used or mixed with carbonated water, milk, coffee, pancakes, waffles, tea, cake, ice cream, and other foods. There are hundreds of flavors ranging from cherry and peach to vanilla to malt, hazelnut, coconut, almond, gingerbread, chocolate, peppermint, rootbeer, and even toasted marshmallow.

In addition to food and drink, flavored syrups are commonly used in pharmaceutical compounding.

== In coffee and espresso drinks ==
Flavored syrups can also be used to make frappes, which when made with coffee can have other names such as frappuccino, a word created by Starbucks Corporation to trademark their version.

== See also ==
- Agave nectar
- Birch syrup
- Bludwine
- Chocolate syrup
- Italian soda
- List of syrups
- Maple syrup
- Soda jerk
- Squash
- Torani
