= Besan chakki =

Indian dessert

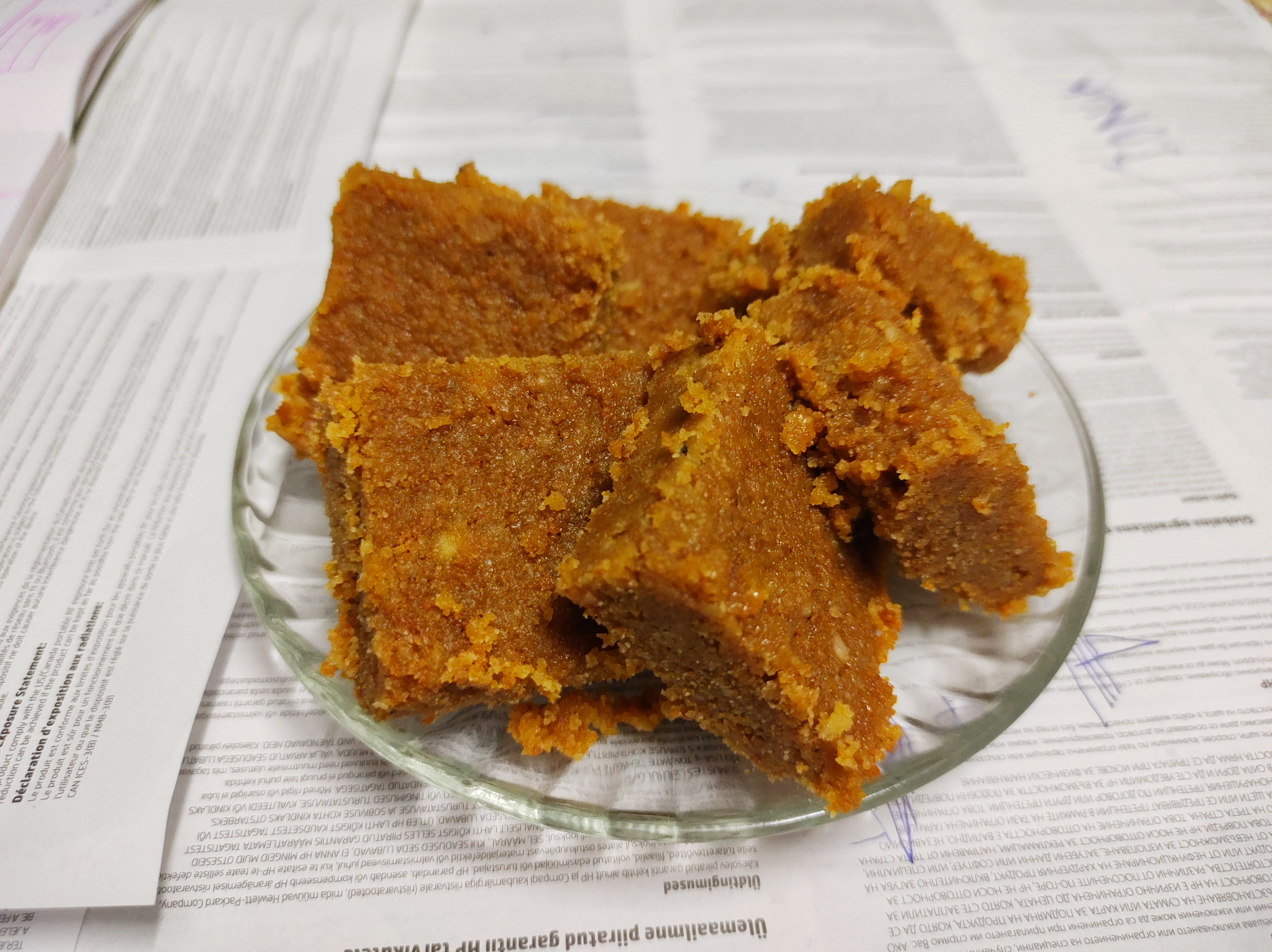
- Besan chakki sweet
- Alternative names: Besan katli, besan khandli, besan barfi
- Course: Dessert
- Place of origin: India
- Region or state: Rajasthan
- Main ingredients: Besan (gram flour), ghee, sugar
- Variations: Mohanthal, dal badam chakki, barfi

Besan chakki (also known as besan barfi) is a traditional Indian sweet made from gram flour (besan), ghee, and sugar, often flavored with cardamom and garnished with nuts. The sweet is known for its firm, fudge-like texture and rich, nutty flavor derived from slow-roasting the gram flour in ghee. While popular throughout North and Western India, its origin is most closely linked to Rajasthan, where gram flour is a staple in both sweets and savory dishes. It holds a prominent place in Rajasthani cuisine, particularly among Marwari communities, and is commonly prepared during festivals, weddings, and religious occasions.

== Etymology ==
Besan chakki is a compound of two words: besan and chakki. Besan refers to gram flour and is derived from the Sanskrit word Vesana. The word Chakki is derived from the Sanskrit word Chakrikā.

== Preparation ==
The sugar blends into a creamy texture that comes from the basic mixture, khoya. The mix is generally heated until the milk solidifies and is then placed in molds of different shapes—diamond, square or sometimes round.

It is usually garnished with sliced or chopped almonds or pistachios. It is sometimes called "Indian cheesecake", though it contains no cheese. Variations of the dish include apricot, mango and coconut flavorings.

The presence of Besan provides a very smooth texture, thus making Khoya an optional ingredient.

== Variation ==
Sometimes, the unsweetened version of besan chakki or besan katli/khandli can be used to make a vegetable preparation. This vegetable preparation is very popular in Rajasthani and Haryanvi cuisine and is known by names like Chakki ro saag, Besan Katli ka saag, Khandli ka saag etc.
