= Tijuana Sweet Heat =

Alcohol liqueur based drink

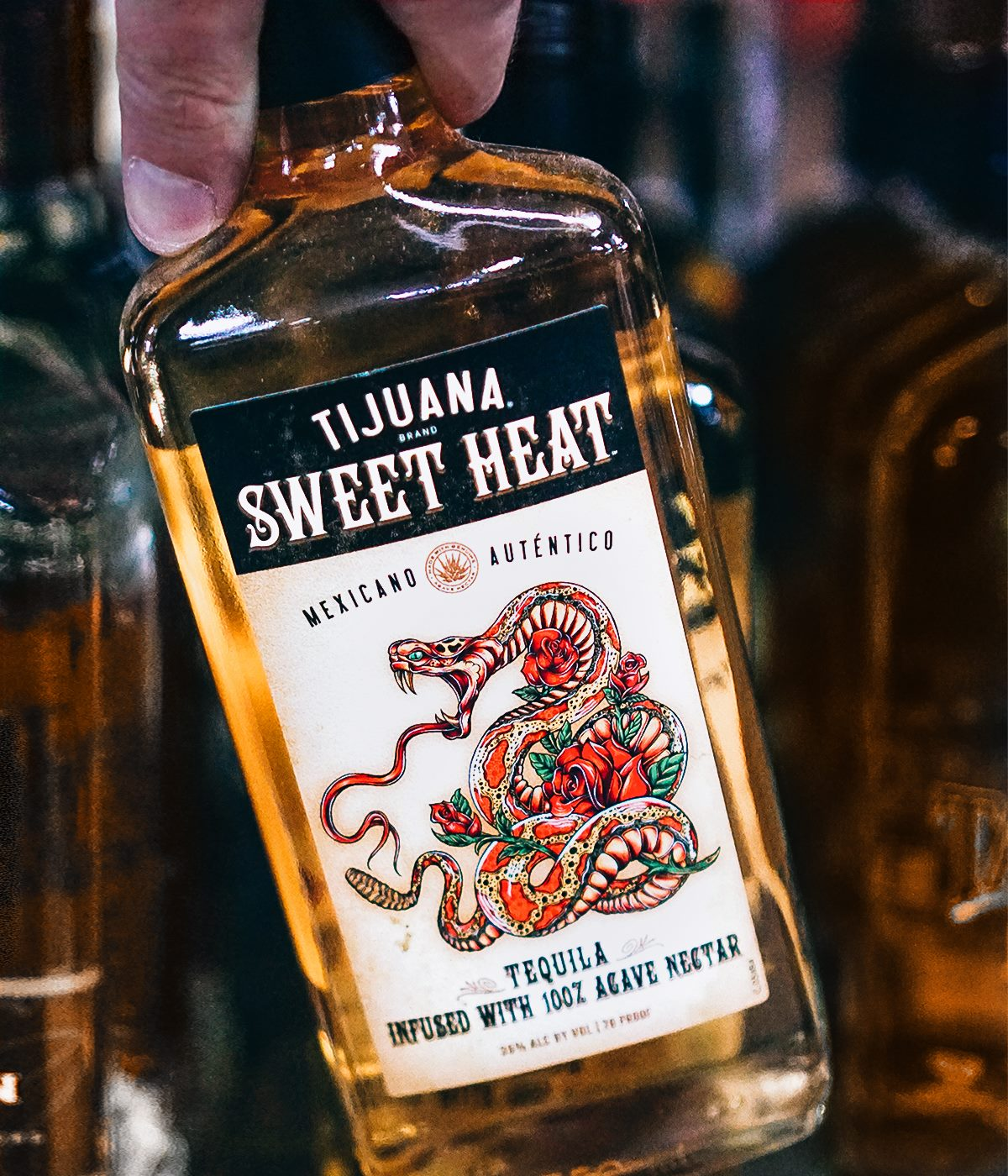
- Bottle of Tijuana Sweet Heat Tequila
- Type: Cinnamon flavored Tequila
- Manufacturer: Sazerac Company
- Origin: United States
- Introduced: 2015
- Alcohol by volume: 35% by vol
- Proof (US): 70 Proof
- Color: Gold
- Flavor: cinnamon
- Ingredients: Tequila; Agave nectar
- Website: tijuanasweetheat.com

Tijuana Sweet Heat is a liqueur made from gold tequila infused with Agave nectar. As a result it is 35% ABV. The product was introduced in 2015 by the Sazerac Company and is sold in the United States. It is available in 1 L, 750 mL, and 50 mL.

== Reception ==
Fox News reviewed Tijuana Sweet Heat, and found that it is suitably formulated for use in shooters, but noted that the label, which claims that it is infused with "100% agave nectar" might lead to the incorrect assumption that it is a pure agave tequila, not a liqueur, as did other reviewers.

Tijuana Sweet Heat has drawn wide comparisons to Fireball Whisky: DrinkSpirits.com noted that it offered a similar brand promise to Fireball, being "overly sweet" but ideal for use in shots.

MSN reviewed Tijuana Sweet Heat, saying the spirit could be the next Fireball, or Fireball’s cousin. They noted tequila purists likely would miss the point of the product, as it is not meant for traditionalists, but for fans of Fireball. The reviewer preferred the product as a shot.

EverydayDrinkers.com says Tijuana Sweet Heat could be the next Fireball. The reviewers commend the quality of Tijuana Sweet Heat, especially compared to products at a similar price point such as Jose Cuervo. The reviewers make note that the product would be perfect for Margaritas and mixed drinks. They specifically praise Tijuana's level of agave sweetness, in that it just needs sour mix for cocktails.

A review from FirstWeFeast is called "Tijuana Sweet Heat is the next Fireball". The review discusses that Millennials may start seeing Fireball as too mainstream to be cool, and Tijuana Sweet Heat is well poised to fill that void. The review adds Tijuana Sweet Heat is "sweet and easy to shoot(...)".

VinePair praised the Sazerac company's decision to utilize a Tequila base, calling the move a bright one, as tequila demand is high among millennials. They continue to praise Tijuana Sweet Heat's marketing approach, one that values a grassroots connection with everyday people, rather than partnering with celebrities.

Spirits judge and writer Derek Brown sees Tijuana Sweet Heat as a product not intended to be well received by tequila aficionados and purists.

== Tasting Notes ==
Tijuana Sweet Heat features sweet agave syrup complemented by white pepper, bell pepper, dill, and roasted agave. Many reviewers have noted a sweet middle and end. Underlying tequila emerges in the mid palate with white pepper. The finish ends with a small pepper kick.

== Availability ==
Tijuana Sweet Heat is sold in the US.
