= Mohanthal =

Indian sweet dish named after Bhagwan Krishna

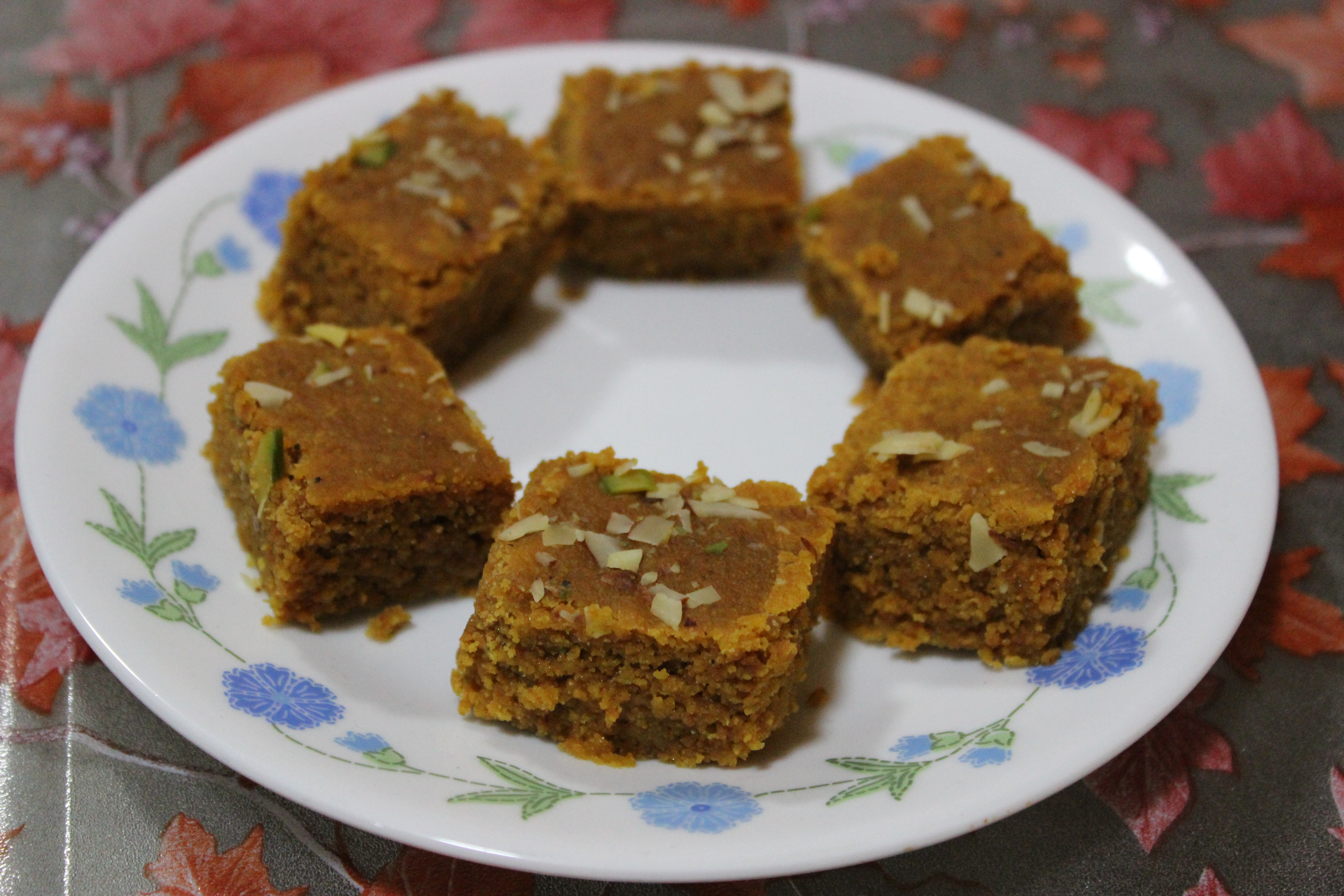
- Mohanthal sweet served in a platter
- Alternative names: Mohanthar
- Course: Dessert
- Place of origin: India
- Region or state: Western India
- Main ingredients: Besan (gram flour), condensed milk, sugar
- Variations: Besan chakki, Dal Badam Chakki

Mohanthal is an Indian sweet made from traditional besan (gram flour). It is common in the Braj, Sindh, Rajasthan, and Gujarat regions of India. As with other sweets from the Indian subcontinent it is commonly consumed at religious festivals such as Diwali, Krishna Janamashtami, or as prasad, an offering at a mandir.

== Preparation ==
Mohanthal is made from besan, ghee, and sugar and can be combined with many other ingredients, such as spices and nuts. There are several besan based sweets in Indian cuisine but each are prepared slightly differently. For example, in magas sugar is added directly, whereas in mohanthal, first a sugar syrup called chashni is made, and then added to the besan.

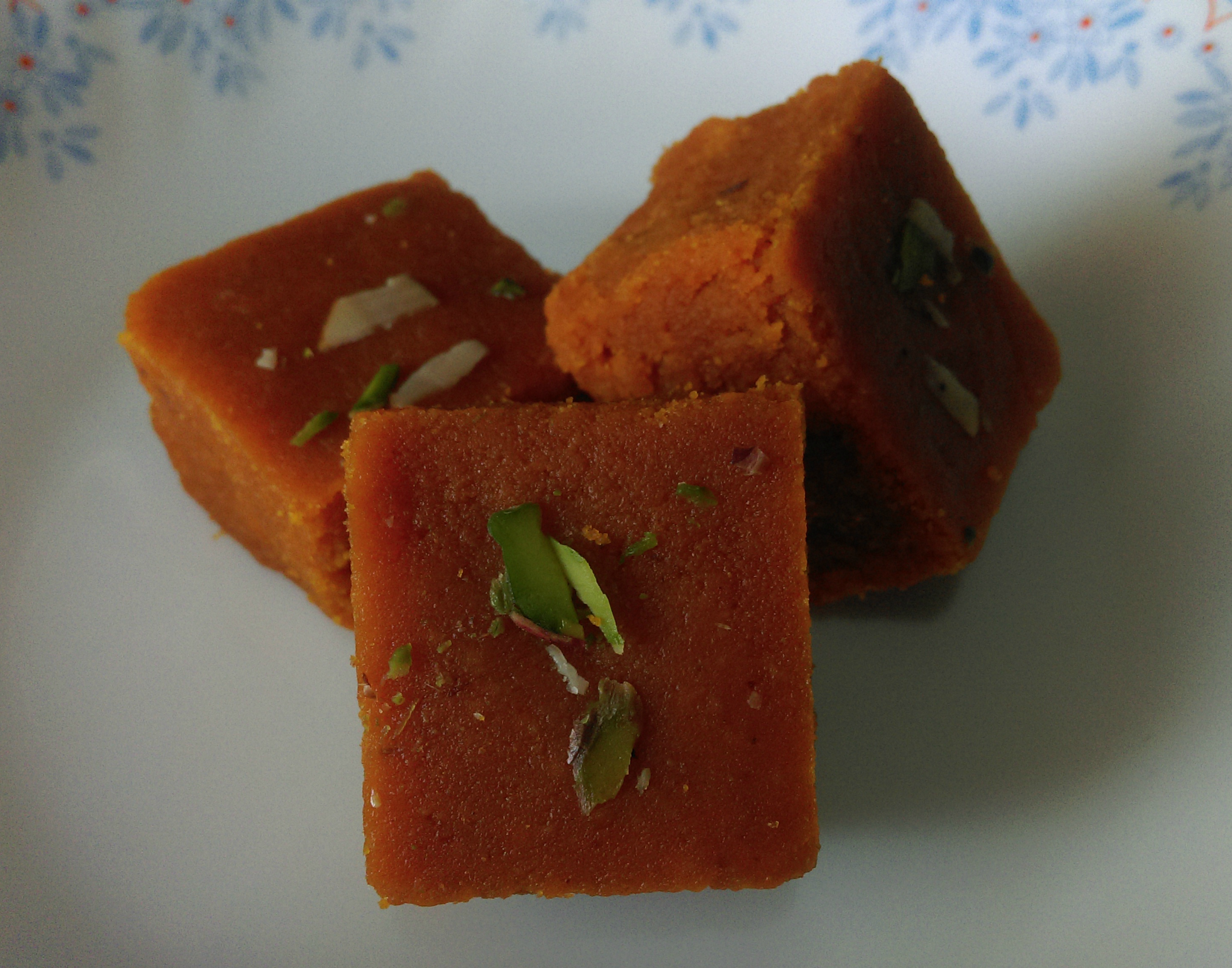
Mohanthal

== Etymology ==
The word Mohanthal is compound of two words: Mohan and thal. Mohan is a Sanskrit word and is used an epithet for Hindu god Krishna. Mohan also means something which is attractive, captivating or enticing. The name Mohan is used for Shri Krishna due to his attractive personality. The word Thāl is derivative of Sanskrit word Sthāla which means a plate and here refers to plate in which this Bhog is set.
