= Monin (company) =

French beverage company

Georges Monin
- Type: Privately held company
- Industry: Beverages
- Founded: 1912; 114 years ago
- Headquarters: Bourges, France
- Products: syrups, liqueurs, fruit purees
- Number of employees: 600
- Website: www.monin.com

Monin is a French company that produces and markets syrups, liqueurs and fruit purees.

== History ==
The company was founded in 1912 by Georges Monin, but it was not until the 1920s that the first syrups were made.

Georges Monin died in 1944. However, the company remained family-owned. His son Paul took over the management of the company a few months later. He abandoned wine production and concentrated on syrups, establishing a network of dealers throughout France. In 1996, Paul Monin's son, Olivier Monin, established a production unit in Clearwater, Florida. In 2018, he established one in China.

75% of its revenue comes from international business.

The company has locations in France, Asia, North America and Australia.
