= Syrup of Maidenhair =

European fern beverage

Syrup of Maidenhair, or Capillaire, is a beverage. It is a syrup made from adiantum (maidenhair fern) leaves. The concentrate is sweetened with sugar or honey and is mixed with a liquid, most commonly water or milk, before drinking.

== Uses ==
In Portugal, a drink called Capillé is made of syrup of maidenhair, grated lemon zest, and cold water. More modern versions use orange flower water, water, and sugar.

In 17th-century Bavaria, it was added to a hot drink made from eggs, milk, and tea. In 18th-century Europe, it was used in popular milk-based mixed drinks.

It is an ingredient in a popular 19th-century mixed drink called Gin Punch.

== See also ==
- List of syrups
