= Yacón syrup =

Syrup made from the root of the yacón plant

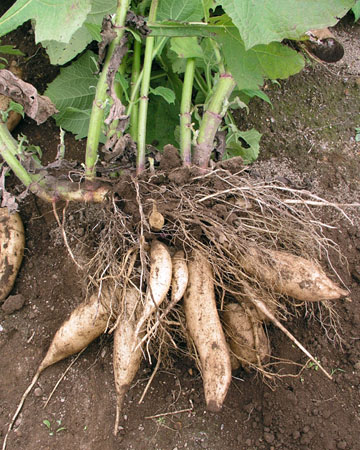
The tuberous roots of the yacón plant (Smallanthus sonchifolius)

Yacón syrup is a sweetening agent extracted from the tuberous roots of the yacón plant (Smallanthus sonchifolius) indigenous to the Andes mountains.

It was used by the Incas. In Peru, people eat yacón because of its nutritional properties—few calories and low sugar levels. In Bolivia, yacón roots are eaten by people with diabetes or other digestive and renal disorders. In Brazil, the dried leaves are used to make yacón tea, said to be antidiabetic.

The syrup contains up to 50% of fructooligosaccharides (FOS). The consumption of FOS does not increase blood glucose; however, the root contains free fructose at about 35%.

The ratio of FOS and free sugars in the root is dependent on growing techniques, time of harvest, and storage condition. Plant & Food Research (formally known as Crop & Food Research) New Zealand published a study on maximizing FOS production in yacon after trials in New Zealand.

Sydney University's Glycemic Index Research Service (SUGiR) conducted a glycemic index study on a New Zealand-made yacon concentrate syrup, the result shows the GI value of the syrup is 40 ± 4, it is categorized as a low GI food.

It is usually made with an evaporator, like the ones used to make maple syrup. It has a taste similar to molasses or caramelized sugar. In a study by Yoshida et al. (2002), an enzyme solution of yacón was determined to be a better antioxidant than enzyme solutions of potato, mushroom, eggplant and edible burdock.

In a study by Genta et al., it was shown that a daily intake of yacón syrup produced a significant decrease in body weight, waist circumference and body mass index when given to obese pre-menopausal women.

== See also ==
- List of syrups
