= Chashni =

Iranian condiment

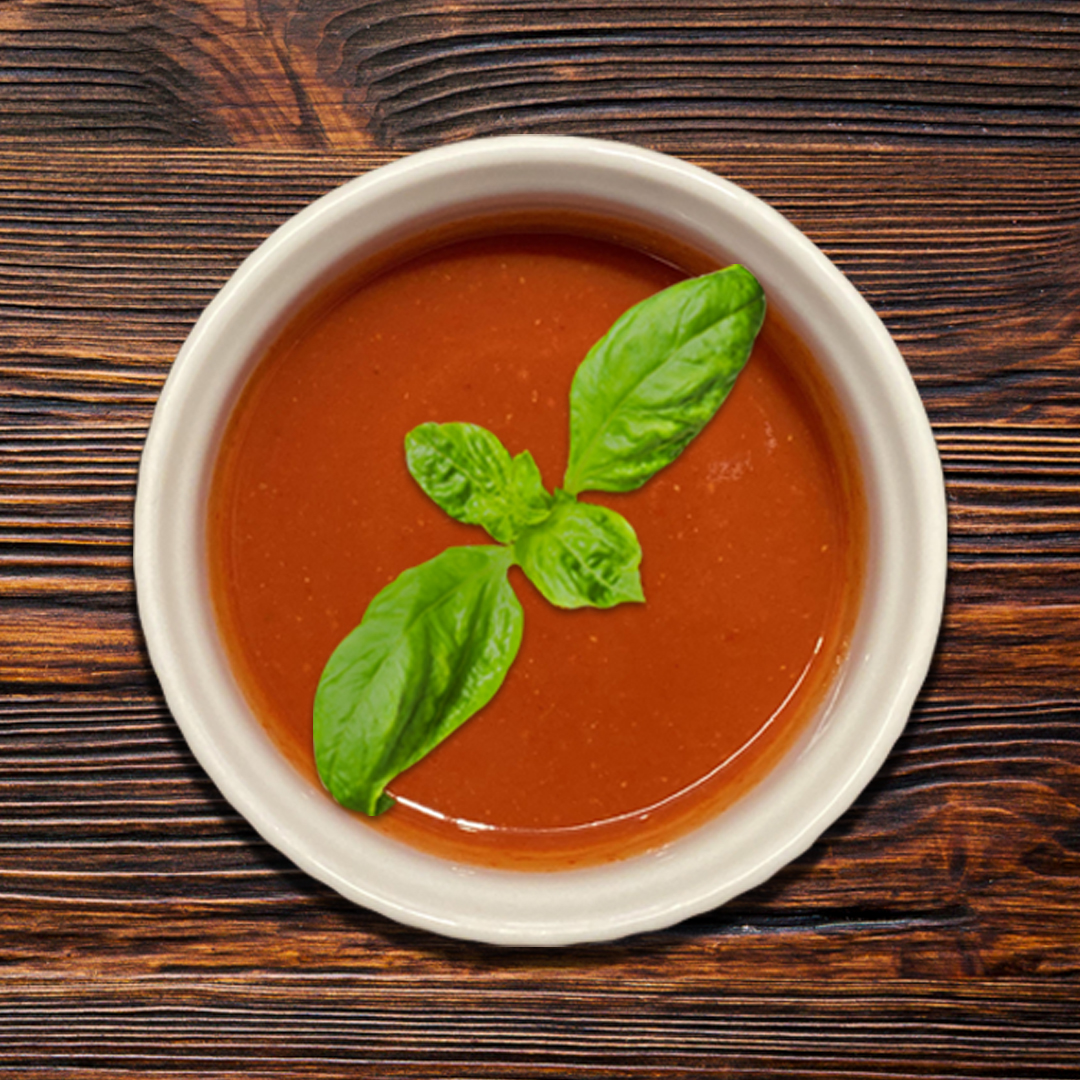
- Chaashnig Hot Sauce
- Type: Hot sauce
- Course: Condiment
- Place of origin: Iran
- Main ingredients: Chili Peppers

Chashni or chaashni (Pahlavi or Middle Persian: chaashnig; chaashnik, Persian Language: چاشنی) is a spice, sauce, or preparation that is added to food to impart a specific taste, to enhance the flavor, or to complement the dish. Some kinds of chaashni are used during cooking to add flavor or texture: saffron, barbecue sauce, teriyaki sauce, soy sauce, and pomegranate juice are examples. Chaashni is sometimes added prior to serving and is used to taste by the dish, for example, in a sandwich made with ketchup, mustard, mayonnaise, sriracha, or hot sauce.

Moreover, Chashni (Hindi: चाशनी, Urdu: چاشنی, Nepali: चास्नी) is the generic name in North Indian, Pakistani, Nepali and Afghan languages for a sugary syrup. The syrup is usually thin enough to allow some swirling, and can have several flavors incorporated in it, such as rose or saffron. Chashni or sugar syrup is used in many Indian sweets and desserts in varying viscosity such as one-thread, two-thread or three-thread consistency (1 tar-chasni, 2 tar-chasni or 3 tar-chasni). "Thread" refers to string that forms between the finger and thumb. Its preparation involves boiling water with sugar and stirring until the desired consistency is reached. For foods in which chashni needs to be absorbed, a thinner consistency called single thread syrup is used. Sweets that need sugar to set use two thread syrup, which is obtained by boiling and stirring for a longer time. Three thread syrup is used in making Indian ground sugar. Popular Indian desserts which use chashni include gulab jamun, rasgulla, boondi ladoo, and mohanthal.

== Etymology ==
The term Chaashni in New Persian roots in the term “Kweks” or “Kwok” in Indo-European languages meaning to see; show. Then, in Avestan, one of the languages of Old Persian as a branch of the Indo-European languages in their Indo-Iranian subdivision, the term has changed to Cāsh-, kash-, Chash- meaning to behold, see, and taste. In Middle Persian, terms such as Chaashnig, Chaashnik, čāšišn, čašitan, and čaxšišn were used to mean taste, tasting, and teaching. According to Henning, C’šny in Parthian language and C’šnyg in Middle Persian language were used to mean taste. “A Concise Pahlavi Dictionary by D. N. Mackenzie” refers to č’šnyg as meaning taste in Middle Persian. According to Iranica, “With Aristotle it has been observed that it is through the faculties of sight (wēnišn), touch (pahrmānišn), taste (čāšišn), smell (bōyišn, hanbōyišn), hearing (āšnawišn) that, in association with the organs of the body, principally the tongue (mādayān uzwān), man conveys his thoughts (mēnišn) in the form of language (Dēnkard, p. 48, tr., p. 66).” “Ka dārūg ē ō kāmēd xwardan ud ka dārūg az ān ī pad xwarišn mehmānīh pad drōn frāz nihišn u-š čāšīng pēš ēn az dārūg kunišn. When one desires to take a drug is among the edibles assembled and set out with the drōn, he should taste the drug before.” According to this, the word originates from Persian, in which it means taste, or flavor.

== History of chaashni in Iran ==
In ancient Persia, saffron (kurkum in Middle Persian) was cultivated in the 10th century BC. Saffron was used by ancient Persian as a brilliant yellow dye, perfume, and a medicine and they mixed it into hot teas as a curative for bouts of melancholy. Indeed, Persian saffron threads were used to spice foods and teas. In addition, Persian saffron was dissolved in water with sandalwood to use as a body wash after heavy work and perspiration under the hot Persian sun. Later, Persian saffron was heavily used by Alexander the Great and his forces during their Asian campaigns. They mixed saffron into teas and dined on saffron rice. Alexander personally used saffron sprinkled in warm bath water, taking after Cyrus the Great. Much like Cyrus, he believed it would heal his many wounds, and his faith in saffron grew with each treatment.

Golpar (Heracleum persicum, commonly known as Persian hogweed), originally native to the region of Iran, has been used as a spice in Persian cooking since ancient times. Moreover, pomegranate juice or pomegranate molasses has been used in Iranian cuisine from old times since the pomegranate originated in Iran and is native to this region.

== See also ==
- List of syrups
