= Oleo saccharum =

Sugar-oil mixture

Oleo saccharum ("oil sugar") is a sugar-oil mixture produced by coating citrus or other oil-rich fruit rinds in an excess of sugar. The essential oils extracted into the sugar give a concentrated aromatic mixture rich in terpenes. Because the oils are hydrophobic and volatile, they cannot be obtained through simple aqueous extraction processes. In mixology, oleo saccharum can be used to sweeten beverages by their direct use or as an ingredient in flavored syrups. Oleo saccharum is a key component in many punch recipes, being listed as an ingredient as early as 1670.

Oil extraction is greatly accelerated through muddling or mechanical abrasion of the mixture, which helps to rupture oil-rich vacuoles on the rinds' surface or flavedo.

A frequent misconception is that oil extraction occurs due to sugar's hygroscopic nature, though this is unlikely as the essential oils being extracted are hydrophobic. A similar misconception is that the extraction occurs via osmosis; the sugar cannot dissolve in the oil, so there is no sugar-solute based osmotic gradient.

An evolution of this technique, known as oleo citrate, replaces sugar with dry organic acids (such as citric and malic acid) to extract the essential oils from citrus peels. First developed by bartender Nickle Morris and popularized under the name super juice, this method yields a highly aromatic, stabilized citrus juice substitute that is widely used in modern bars to extend shelf life and reduce waste.
