= Cherry Smash =

Carbonated beverage

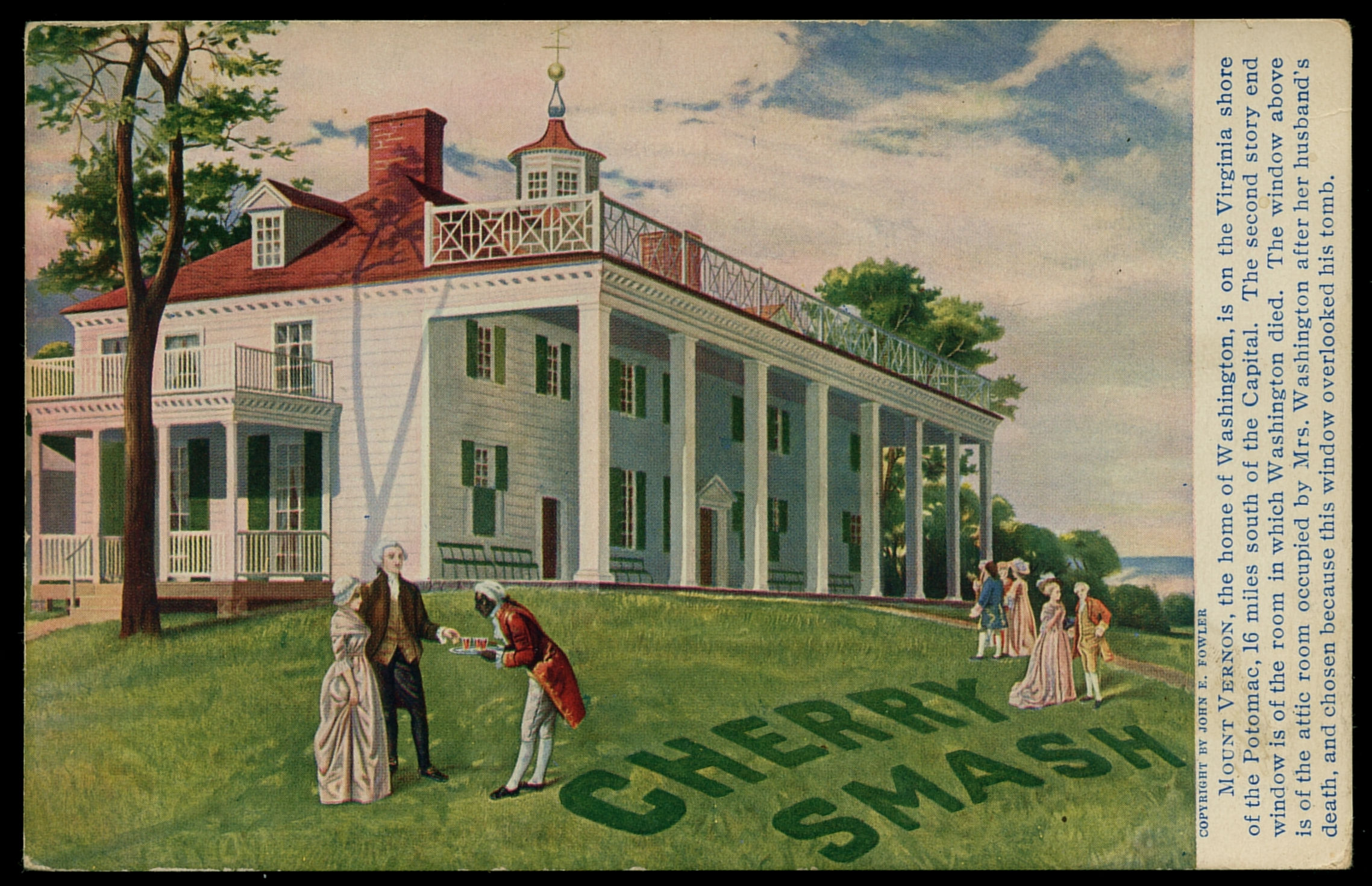
Advertising postcard for Cherry Smash (with Mount Vernon)

Cherry Smash was a fountain syrup made from cherry syrup along with a blend of other fruit flavors which soda jerks mixed with carbonated water and phosphate. During the 1920s it was available at soda fountains and pharmacies along the East Coast of the United States, but the product is no longer produced in the present day.

== History ==
Cherry Smash was founded in 1901 by Richmond, Virginia, native John E. Fowler. In 1920, he began to produce it in a former brewery in Arlington, Virginia. He produced it for almost 30 years.

It was sold from ball-shaped dispensers and were common at American drug stores along with other sodas at the time.

== See also ==
- List of syrups
