= Fox's U-bet chocolate syrup =

Commercial chocolate syrup

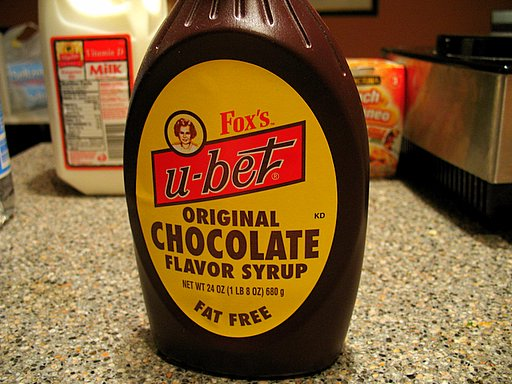
Fox's U-Bet in plastic squeeze bottle

Fox's U-bet chocolate syrup is a commercial chocolate syrup originally made by H. Fox & Company in Brooklyn, New York starting c. 1900. It was said to be invented in a basement in Brownsville, Brooklyn, according to David Fox. Herman Fox, his grandfather, left town for the Texas oil boom and returned only with the phrase "you bet." U-bet syrup is best known as being a key component in the fountain beverage, the egg cream. While the specific order in preparation is subject to much debate within New York City, the components of the classic egg cream recipe consist of U-Bet syrup, milk and seltzer. The beverage has since become an iconic staple in New York's Jewish delis since its invention in the 1880s. H. Fox & Company was acquired by US Westminster Foods in 2016, and is currently manufactured in Farmingdale, New York.

== See also ==
- List of syrups
