= Bosco Chocolate Syrup =

Brand of chocolate syrup

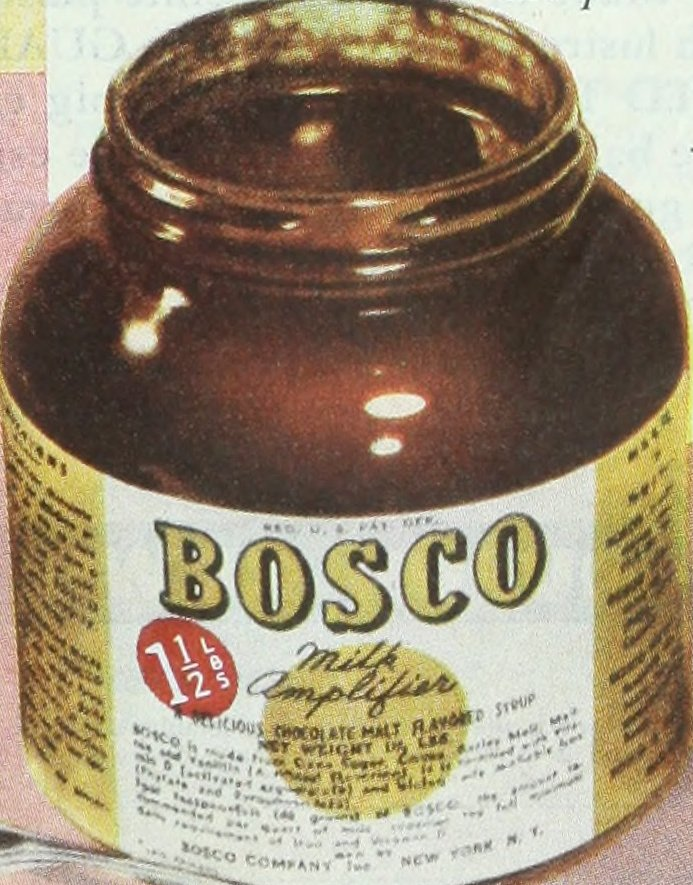
Bosco chocolate syrup

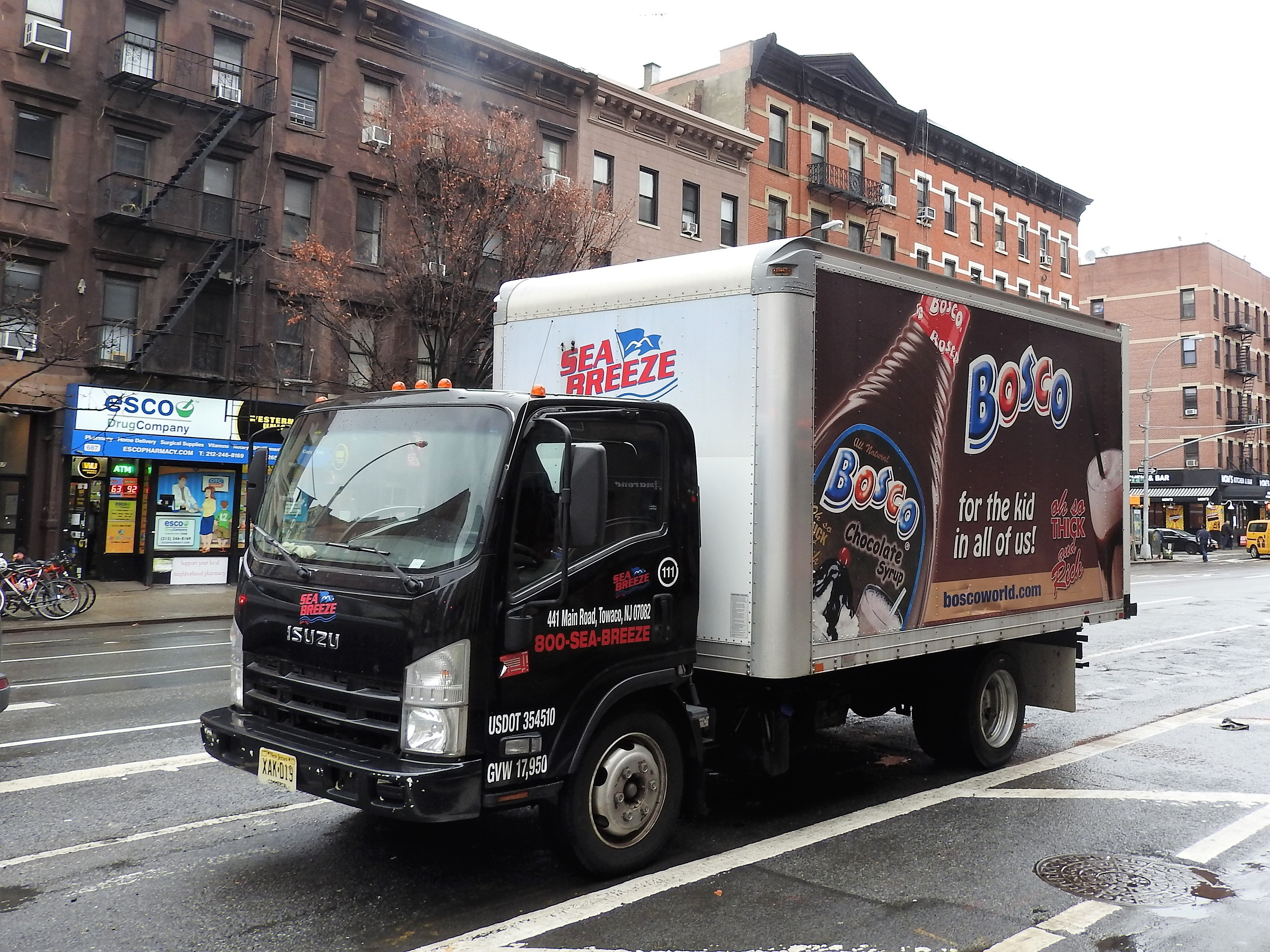
Bosco delivery truck in Manhattan (2018)

Bosco Chocolate Syrup is a brand of chocolate syrup first produced in 1928. The company, Bosco Products, Inc., is based in Towaco, New Jersey, and products are sold throughout the United States and Europe.

== History ==
Bosco Chocolate syrup was purportedly invented in 1928 in Camden, New Jersey, by an unknown physician. The William S. Scull Company, founded in 1931 in Camden, acquired the manufacturing license. The Scull Company's most famous product was Boscul Coffee, which gave the product its brand name, "Bosco". In the 1950s, Corn Products Company acquired the brands Bosco, and Bosco Products, Inc. in 1985. The name recalls the Ancient Greek word βόσκω (bóskō), "I nourish."

Bosco Chocolate Syrup, at that time called Bosco Milk Amplifier, was heavily advertised on children's shows during the late 1950s and early 1960s, such as The Popeye Club, a local Atlanta, Georgia, program featuring Popeye cartoons, as well as live action sequences. An important feature of many of the television advertisements was the jingle, I love Bosco.

Bosco commercials were featured frequently as some of the "retromercials" used in lieu of commercial breaks on TV Land during its earliest years.

Bosco ads often featured the "Bosco Chiller-Diller" concoction.

Bosco TV and radio ads also featured the "Bosco Nova" song and dance, set to a bossa nova beat.

The company has branched out and makes other products, including candy bars bearing the brand name.

Vik Muniz, a modern artist, is famous for recreating well-known works of art, such as The Last Supper by Leonardo da Vinci, entirely in Bosco Chocolate Syrup. A Bosco portrait by Muniz sold for $110,000 in 2007.

== Production process ==
Formerly, bulk materials were added via automatic measuring devices into stainless steel cooking vats. Minor ingredients and flavorings were blended into the batch separately, through a custom blender device, adhering to stringent product handling standards. While in the vats, Bosco was pasteurized for product uniformity and then cooled for bottling. Computers measured and monitored the product temperatures. Malt extract and vanilla was added and combined with cocoa powder, which yielded the distinctive Bosco taste.

As of 2020, Bosco no longer follows this process. The recipe now omits malt extract and vanilla, altering the flavor and viscosity of the product.

Bosco was once packaged in glass jars, but is now sold in plastic squeeze bottles.

As of 2015, Bosco is produced in several flavors in addition to the original chocolate: strawberry, sea salt caramel, fudge brownie, sugar free, and mocha (the last of which was added c. 2012, replacing berry blue).

== See also ==
- List of syrups

== Sources ==
- Barth, Linda J. (August 20, 2013). A History of Inventing in New Jersey: From Thomas Edison to the Ice Cream Cone. Charleston, South Carolina: The History Press. pp. 69–70. ISBN 9781626192065.
- Sietsema, Robert (July 7, 2009). "A Short, Unsatisfying History of Bosco Chocolate Syrup". The Village Voice. Archived from the original on November 22, 2015.
