= Bludwine =

Brand of cherry-flavored soft drink and flavored syrups

- For Your Health's Sake

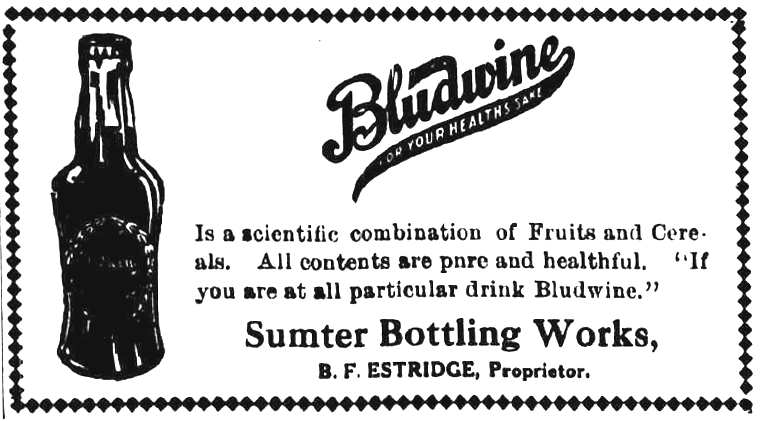
- Newspaper ad with bottle style, 1916
- Produced by: Henry C. Anderson
- Introduced: 1906

Bludwine, later Budwine, was a brand of cherry-flavored soft drink and flavored syrups that was originally produced in the United States by the Bludwine Company and Bludwine Bottling Company. The Bludwine Company was founded by Henry C. Anderson in spring, 1906. Bludwine Company produced the master elixir in Athens, Georgia, and various Bludwine Bottling Company locations processed the elixir into syrup and bottled soft drinks prepared from the syrup. The syrups were also shipped to and used at soda fountains as an ingredient to add flavor to various beverages. In 1911 Bludwine was marketed as having health benefits, such as aiding in digestion, and some physicians in Athens, Georgia and other areas of the state prescribed it to their patients. The brand's name was changed from Bludwine to Budwine in 1921. Production of Budwine stopped in the mid 1990s.

== Bludwine Company ==
Henry C. Anderson founded the Bludwine Company in Athens, Georgia in Spring, 1906 with $60 capital, and in 1910 the company was incorporated. Bludwine's master elixir was manufactured solely in Athens (as of 1917), and then shipped to various Bludwine Company factory locations where it was used in the preparation of syrups. The syrup was also produced from the elixir at the company's location in Athens. By 1917, the Bludwine Company operated in 26 U.S. states and had over 100 syrup bottling plants, and the Athens location was producing quantities of elixir that allowed for the production of 16,000 gallons of syrup daily. The company used a distillery to purify water used in producing the elixir.

In the 1920s, Joseph Costa, an owner of an ice cream parlor in Athens, ran the company, and the Costa family owned the franchising rights for Budwine. Production of Budwine stopped in the mid 1990s.

== Bludwine Bottling Company ==
Bludwine Bottling Company locations processed the master elixir produced and received from Athens, Georgia into syrup and bottled soft drinks prepared from the syrup. Bottling plant locations included New York City (New York Bludwine Co.), Dallas, Texas (Dallas Bludwine Company) and Jacksonville, Florida, among others, and the product was distributed throughout the United States.

In 1919, the Bludwine Bottling Company had Georgia-state locations in Athens, Augusta, Elberton, Gainesville, Macon and Rome.

A 1914 Bludwine advertisement stated that the bottles containing the product were in a hobble skirt shape and were sealed with a crown seal.

== Composition ==
Bludwine has been described as "cherry-flavored" as well as "a real invigorating, life-giving drink with a pungency and flavor that are unsurpassed". (Note: Athens Tribune. October 8, 1911.) The soft drink's primary ingredients included wheat and oats, lemon, orange, grape, ginger and peppermint. Refined sugar, created from imported raw sugar, was another notable ingredient.

In 1912, the U.S. Bureau of Chemistry analyzed a sample of Bludwine syrup as part of U.S. v. Bludwine Co., and published results stating the syrup contained 0.142% citric acid, 0.066% phosphoric acid, 62.5% total solids, 0.11% alcohol, 0.11% ash, 1.2% sucrose, 63.7% total sugar as invert, 0.37% total acid as citric, flavor: capsicum and color: amaranth.

== Name change ==
In 1921, the company changed the name of the soft drink product from Bludwine to Budwine. At this time, the company announced that while the quality of the drink could not be further improved, the name was able to be improved.

== Alleged health benefits ==
In its earlier years, Bludwine was sometimes marketed as a product that had health benefits, such as for digestion. In 1911 article that some Athens, Georgia area physicians and other Georgia state physicians endorsed Bludwine as promoting digestion, and some prescribed it to their patients. (Note: Athens Tribune. October 8, 1911. This news article is quoted within the book A Standard History of Georgia and Georgians)

== Legal matters ==
U.S. v. Bludwine Co. was an information against Bludwine Co. that was filed on November 4, 1912 by the United States Attorney for the Northern District of Georgia in the District Court of the United States. The information was based upon Bludwine shipping its syrup over state lines from Georgia to Tennessee in violation of the Foods and Drug Act, per the accusation that Bludwine was misbranding its product in a false and misleading manner due to the "Bludwine Syrup" label on the syrup products. The information asserted that consumers would be misled to believe that the product contained wine when no wine actually existed in it, per the package labeling. A court trial with a jury occurred, and Bludwine was found not guilty in the proceedings on May 28, 1913.

== See also ==
- List of brand name soft drinks products
- List of soft drink producers
- List of soft drink flavors
- List of syrups
