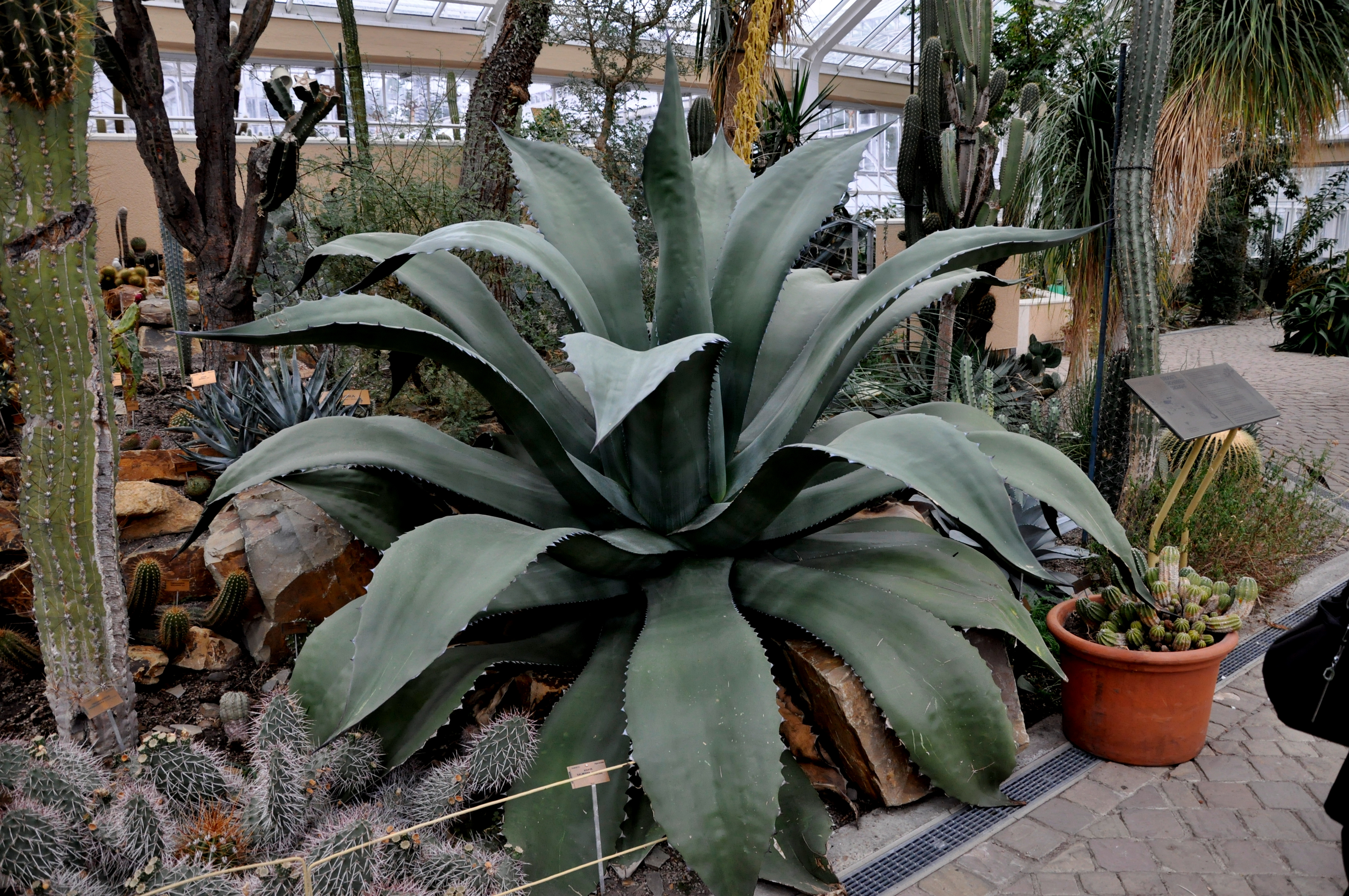
- Agave ferox in the greenhouses of a botanical garden in Belgium

Scientific classification
- Kingdom: Plantae
- Clade: Tracheophytes
- Clade: Angiosperms
- Clade: Monocots
- Order: Asparagales
- Family: Asparagaceae
- Subfamily: Agavoideae
- Genus: Agave
- Species: A. salmiana
- Variety: A. s. var. ferox

Trinomial name
- Agave salmiana var. ferox (K. Koch, 1860) Gentry

= Agave salmiana var. ferox =

Variety of flowering plant

Agave salmiana var. ferox (Agave ferox) is a variety of the species Agave salmiana belonging to the genus Agave and the family Asparagaceae.

It is very close to the typical subspecies in terms of description and culture.

It is differentiated by even thicker and stiffer leaves, a terminal sting (up to 8 cm) and even sharper lateral spines. This is also what earned it its name.
