= Acetomel =

Syrup made from honey and vinegar

Acetomel is a syrup made from honey and vinegar, giving a sweet and sour taste. It was commonly used in the preservation of fruit, though it is very rarely used today. Certain fruits, when preserved, such as quinces, pears, and grapes, are called aceto-dolce, that is "sweet-and-sour fruit".

== See also ==
- List of syrups
