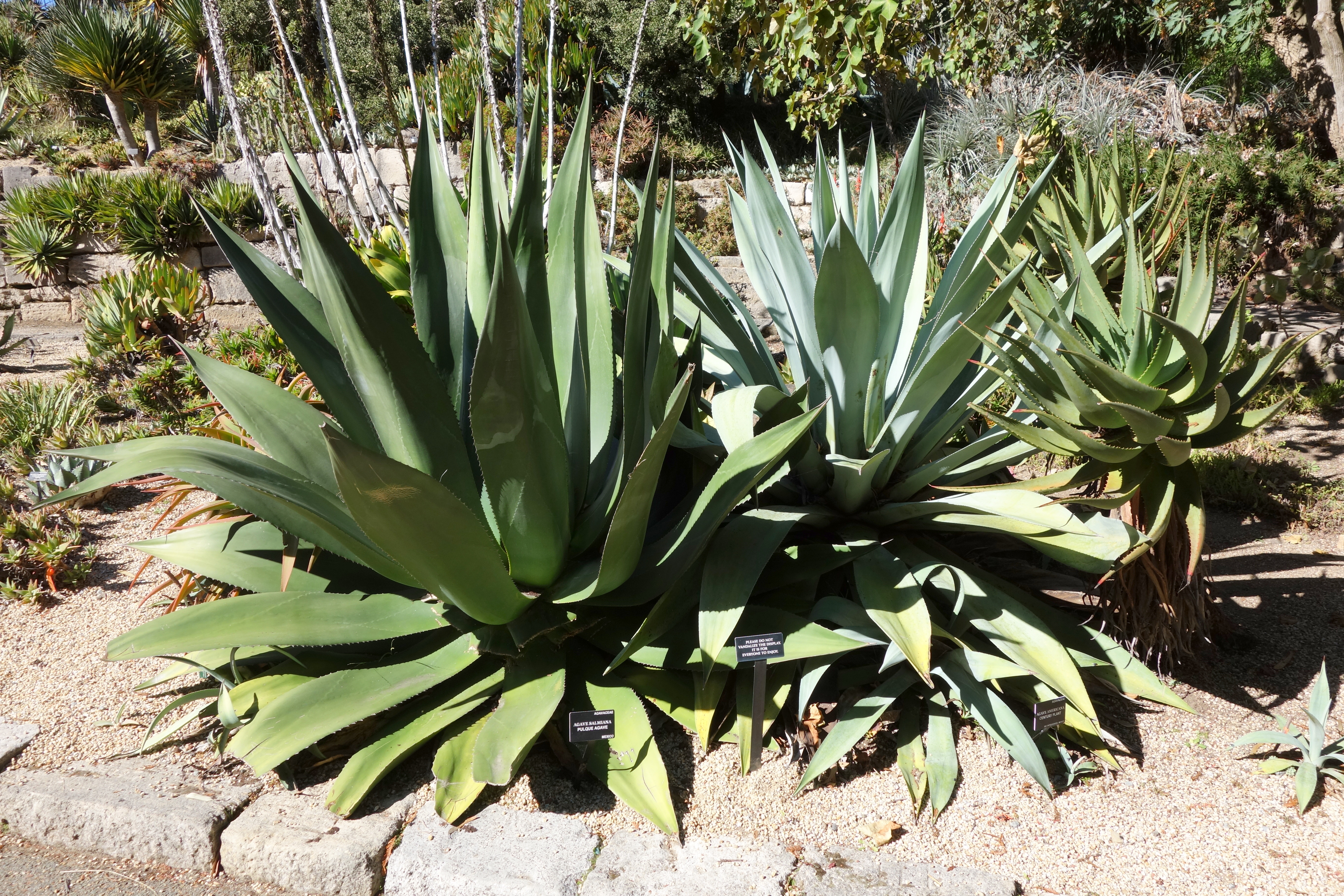
- Agave salmiana in San Francisco Botanical Garden

Conservation status
- Least Concern (IUCN 3.1)

Scientific classification
- Kingdom: Plantae
- Clade: Tracheophytes
- Clade: Angiosperms
- Clade: Monocots
- Order: Asparagales
- Family: Asparagaceae
- Subfamily: Agavoideae
- Genus: Agave
- Species: A. salmiana

Binomial name
- Agave salmiana Otto ex Salm-Dyck

Synonyms
- Agave atrovirens var. salmiana (Otto ex Salm-Dyck) Trel.; Agave atrovirens var. sigmatophylla A. Berger; Agave salmiana var. glauca D.Dietr. ex Becker; Agave caratas Besaucèle; Agave chinensis F.P.Sm.; Agave cochlearis Jacobi; Agave salmiana var. cochlearis (Jacobi) A.Terracc.; Agave compluviata Trel.; Agave dyckii H.Jacobsen; Agave ferdinand-cortezii K.Koch; Agave jacobiana Salm-Dyck; Agave lehmannii Jacobi; Agave maximilianea P.Blázquez & I.Blázquez; Agave montezumae K.Koch; Agave quiotifera Trel. ex Ochot.; Agave ragusae A.Terracc.; Agave whitackeri H.Jacobsen

= Agave salmiana =

Species of flowering plant

Agave salmiana is a species of plant in the family Asparagaceae, native to central and southern Mexico. It is also reportedly naturalized in South Africa, Italy, Spain, especially in the Canary Islands, and southern Portugal.

This species, also called agave of Salm, agave of Salm-Dyck or maguey verde, was dedicated in 1842 by Friedrich Otto to the German prince and botanist Joseph zu Salm-Reifferscheidt-Dyck. Otto mentioned the species as growing in the Berlin botanical garden, without providing a description. It was Salm-Dyck himself who remedied that omission in 1851.

== Description ==
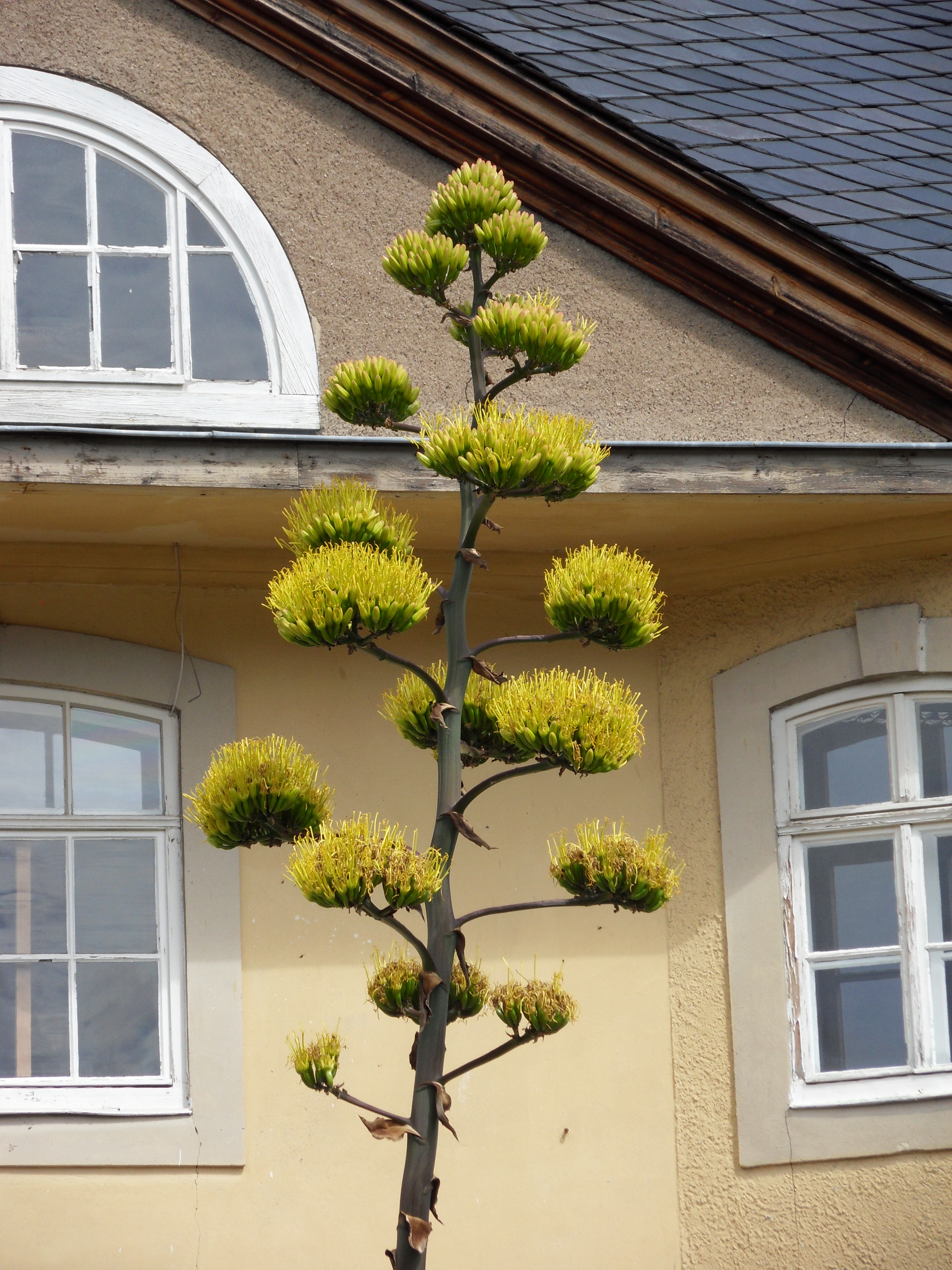
A. salmiana var. ferox flowering in Germany

Agave salmiana presents a spiral-shaped rosette with large flared and erect leaves. These leaves are thick, dark green with a large point at the tip and strong spines on the edges. When a leaf has unfolded, it leaves an imprint on the leaf underneath.

Like most agaves, the species is monocarpic, that is to say it only flowers once and then dies. This flowering occurs after 15 to 25 years producing a vertical floral stem, typically up to 4 m (13 ft) long and bearing greenish-yellow flowers. The largest specimens have been significantly taller. One specimen growing at the Strawberry Canyon Botanical Garden on the campus of U. C. Berkeley, Berkeley, California in 1974 produced an inflorescence with a total height of 16 m (52 ft) of which the scape or peduncle was about 12 m (39 ft) and the panicle per se was 4 m (13 ft). Hermann J.H. Jacobsen states that the inflorescence of A. salmiana has reached an overall height of 19 m (62 ft), making it the tallest of any known plant inflorescence.

Old plants reach 1.8 m in height and the leaves form a rosette 3.6 m in diameter.

The variety A. salmiana var. ferox is often encountered in cultivation. The epithet ferox is due to the hard and long (up to 8 cm) spines.

== Distribution ==
Originally from southern and central Mexico, it was introduced into gardens with a Mediterranean climate in Europe and sometimes escaped into the wild, thus becoming naturalized in some parts of southern Europe.

== Cultivation ==
Cultivation is easy in a well-drained sandy soil with sunny exposure. For a pot culture, it requires a container of very large size to remain in a harmonious appearance. It can be used to stabilize a slope. It can withstand a light frost if it is completely dry. It is multiplied more easily by planting shoots than by seedlings.
