= Chocolate syrup =

Sweet condiment

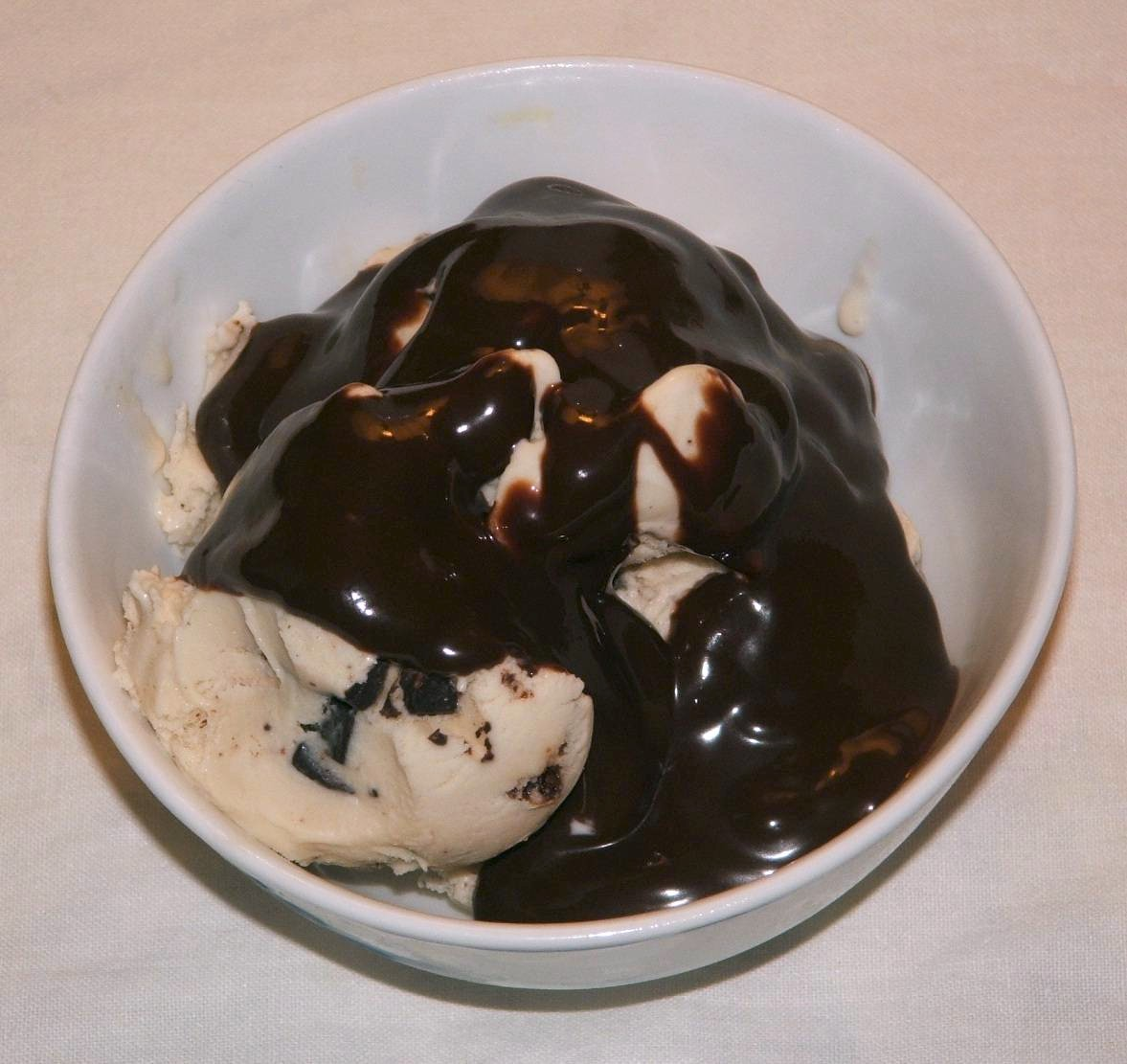
- Chocolate syrup covering a bowl of ice cream
- Type: Syrup
- Place of origin: United States
- Main ingredients: Cocoa powder, sugar water

Chocolate syrup or chocolate sauce, is a sweet, chocolate-flavored condiment. It is often used as a topping or dessert sauce for various desserts, such as ice cream, or mixed with milk to make chocolate milk or blended with milk and ice cream to make a chocolate milkshake. The condiment is sold in a variety of consistencies, ranging from a thin liquid that can be drizzled from a bottle to a thick sauce that needs to be spooned onto the dessert item. Typically, the former is called "syrup" and the latter is called "sauce", although the terms can be used interchangeably.

Chocolate syrup is also used to top puddings and cakes. Some restaurants use an artistic drizzling of chocolate syrup to decorate servings of cheesecake or cake, along with other decorations such as cocoa powder, powdered sugar or chocolate shavings. Some brands of chocolate syrup are marketed as chocolate milk syrup (e.g., Nesquik). Other brands are marketed as ice cream sundae toppings.

== Ingredients ==
A simple chocolate syrup can be made from unsweetened cocoa powder, a sweetener such as sugar, and water. Recipes may also include other ingredients, such as corn syrup, malt, and flavorings like vanilla extract.

== Other uses ==
Beginning in the 1890s, chocolate syrup was marketed as a treatment for ailments, including for infants suffering from colic. In part due to the passage of the 1906 Pure Food and Drug Act, which required clear and accurate labeling, chocolate syrup began to transition from primarily medical application to commercial use.

Chocolate syrup was often used in black-and-white movies to simulate blood, because it was safe for the performers to swallow, easy to get out of clothing, and cheap to buy. It also has an effective-looking viscosity on film. The effect was used in many movies, including The Wasp Woman and Psycho.

== Products ==
- Fox's U-bet chocolate syrup
- Bosco Chocolate Syrup
- Hershey's Chocolate Syrup
- Culver's Chocolate Syrup
- Nestle Nesquik Chocolate Syrup

== See also ==
- Ganache, the melted chocolate and cream preparation
- Hot fudge, a thick chocolate sauce
- List of dessert sauces
- List of syrups
