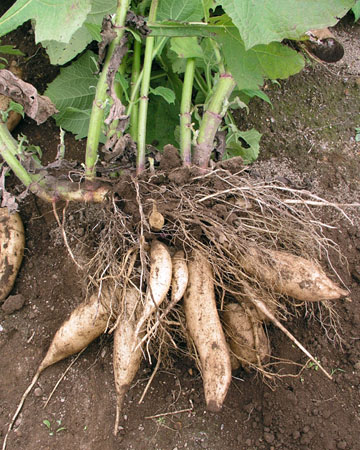
- Roots of yacón

Scientific classification
- Kingdom: Plantae
- Clade: Tracheophytes
- Clade: Angiosperms
- Clade: Eudicots
- Clade: Asterids
- Order: Asterales
- Family: Asteraceae
- Genus: Smallanthus
- Species: S. sonchifolius

Binomial name
- Smallanthus sonchifolius (Poepp.) H. Rob.

Synonyms
- Polymnia sonchifolia Poepp.; Helianthus esculentus Warsz. ex Otto & Dietr.; Polymnia edulis Wedd.

= Yacón =

Species of plant

The yacón (Smallanthus sonchifolius) is a species of daisy traditionally grown in the northern and central Andes from Colombia to northern Argentina for its crisp, sweet-tasting, tuberous roots. Another name for yacón is Peruvian ground apple, possibly from the French name of potato, pomme de terre (ground apple). The tuber is composed mostly of water and various polysaccharides.

== Description ==
Yacón is a perennial herb that grows up to 2.5 metres (8 feet) tall. The stem is cylindrical to angular and hollow when the plant is mature. Leaves are opposite and deltoid. Their upper surface is hairy. Underground tubers consist of branching rhizomes and up to 20 tuberous storage roots. The rhizomes continually produce leafy shoots, while the storage roots are the principal economic product of the plant. The storage roots are up to 25 centimetres (10 inches) long, 10 cm (4 in) wide, achieving a weight of 0.2–2 kilograms (0.44–4.4 pounds), and have varying skin colours. The colour depends on the variety, and ranges from white to pink to brown.

Yacón plants produce small, inconspicuous flowers at the end of the growing season. The timing of flowering strongly depends on the environmental conditions. If environmental conditions are favourable, flowering begins 6–7 months after planting and peaks about two months later. The yellow to orange coloured flower head is a pseudanthium (i.e. one apparent flower head is in reality composed of several florets). Each flower head is bisexual, uniting female and male florets in one pseudanthium. The yellow or orange ray florets are female and up to 12 mm long, while the yellow-brown disc florets are male and about 7 mm long. The seeds are stored inside dark brown achenes averaging 2.2–3.7 mm in length. In general, seed production is rather low; some ecotypes do not produce any seeds at all, due to pollen sterility. Plants produced from seed take longer to mature than do those grown from the tubers or rhizomes.

The texture and flavour of the roots are very similar to jícama, mainly differing in that yacón has some slightly sweet, resinous, and floral (similar to violet) undertones to its flavour, probably due to the presence of inulin, which produces the sweet taste of the roots of elecampane, as well.

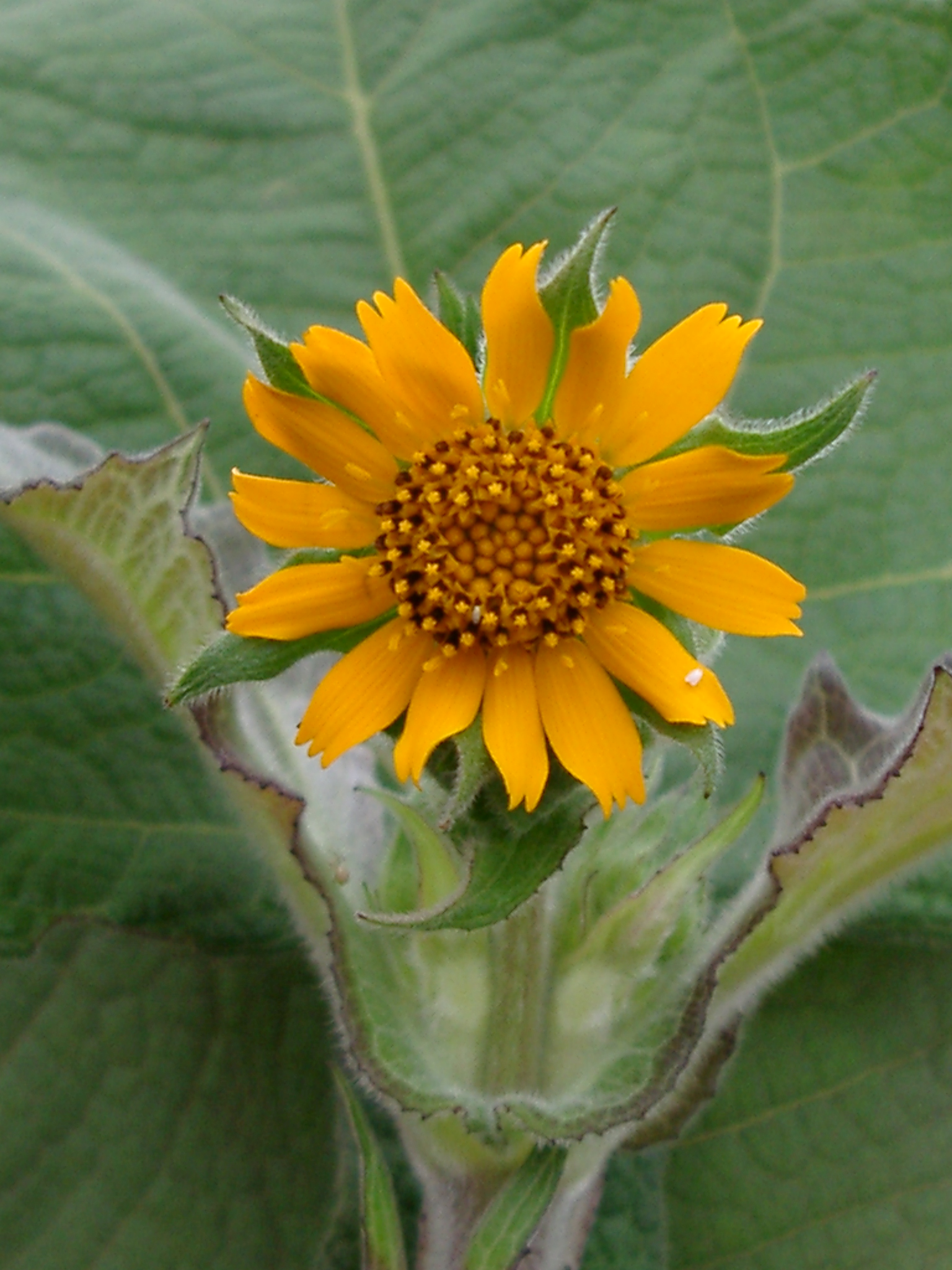
Flower of yacón

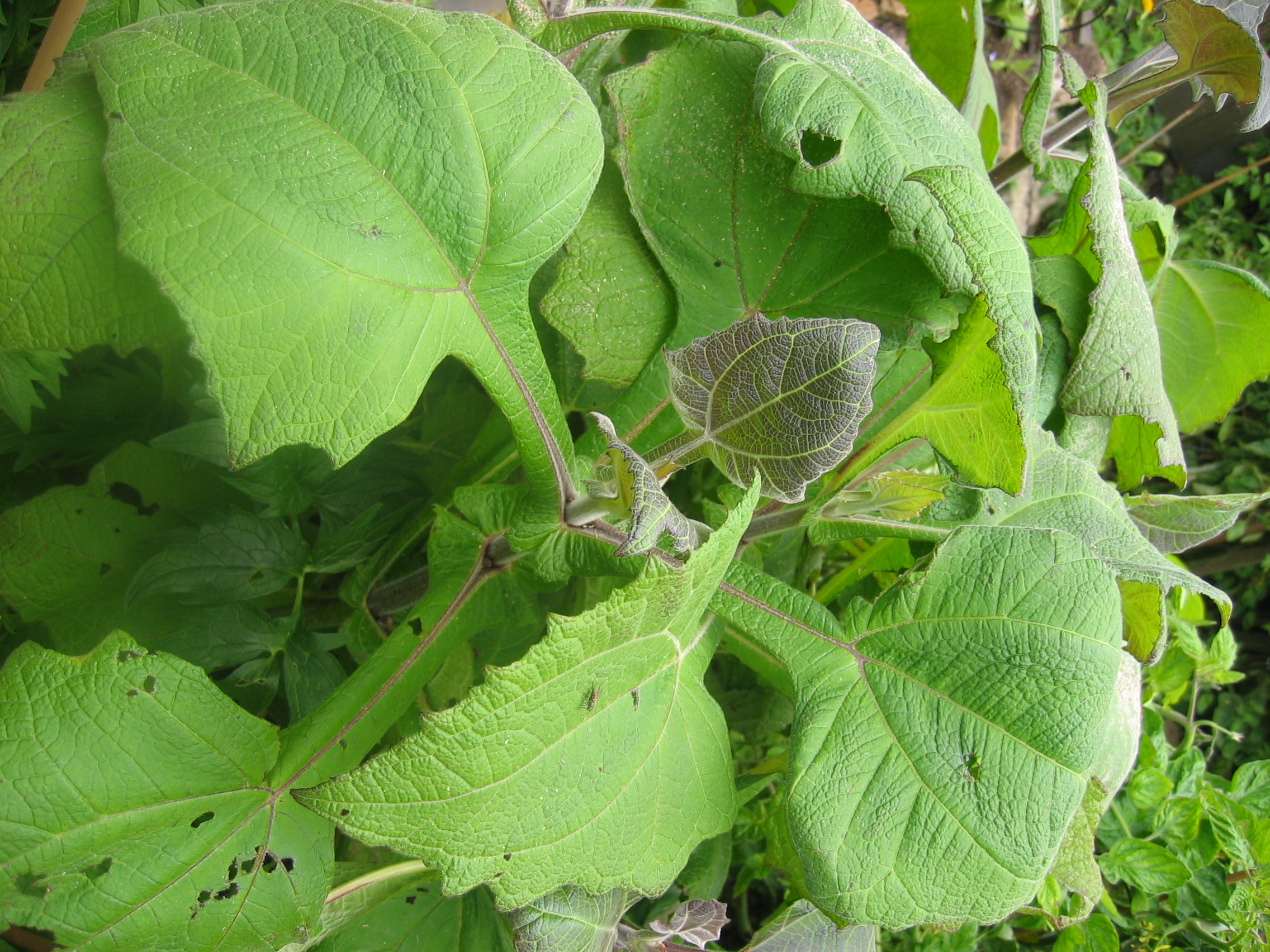
Yacón leaves

=== Similar species ===
Yacón is sometimes confused with the unrelated Pachyrhizus erosus (jícama), which is a legume, as yacón is commonly called jícama in Ecuador. Yacón, in contrast, is a close relative of the sunflower and Jerusalem artichoke. Unlike many other root vegetables domesticated by the indigenous peoples of the Andes (ulluco, oca and mashua), yacón is not photoperiod sensitive and can produce a commercial yield in the subtropics, as well as in mountainous regions.

== Cultivation ==
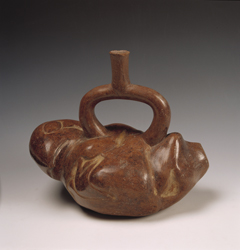
Yacón. Moche Culture. Larco Museum Collection.

Freezing temperatures cause the above-ground parts to die back; the plant will re-sprout from the rhizome under favourable temperature and moisture conditions. The optimal growing temperature range is 18–25 °C.

Yacón can easily be grown in gardens in climates with only light freezes. It grows well in Kathmandu, Nepal, southern Australia (including Tasmania) and in New Zealand, where the climate is mild and the growing season long. The plant was introduced to Japan in the 1980s, and from there its cultivation spread to other Asian countries, notably South Korea, China, and the Philippines, and is now widely available in markets in those countries.

Traditionally, yacón roots are grown by farmers at mid-elevations on the eastern slopes of the Andes descending toward the Amazon. It is grown occasionally along field borders where the juicy tubers provide a welcome source of refreshment during field work. Until as recently as the early 2000s, yacón was hardly known outside of its limited native range, and was not available from urban markets. However, press reports of its use in Japan for its purported antihyperglycemic properties made the crop more widely known in Lima and other Peruvian cities.

Yacón is also grown on the Atherton tablelands in Queensland. The plant can be grown using either stem cuttings or the purple rhizomes at the base of the stalks. It will not reproduce from the tubers, which, when unharvested, rot in the ground, providing fertilizer for later crops.

Outside of its traditional cultivation range, yacon is planted in a well-dug bed in early spring, near the time of the last expected frost. While aerial parts are damaged by freezing temperatures, the tubers are not harmed unless they freeze solid. Yacón is a vigorous grower, much like Jerusalem artichokes. The plants grow best with fertilizer.

After the first few freezes, the tops will die and the tuberous storage roots are ready for digging. Perennial rhizomes are left in the ground for propagating the next crop, or, alternatively, they can be kept in a refrigerator or buried away from freezing temperatures until spring.

=== Diseases and control strategies ===
The yacón plant gets infected by different species such as nematodes, bacteria, fungi, viruses and insects.

The root-knot nematode (Meloidogyne incognita) leads to crop loss due to the various symptoms as poor growth and roots with characteristic galls. Following, disease free propagation material is necessary to intensify the yacon production. A safe procedure is to take shoot axillary buds as ideal explants and a disinfection treatment with a sodium hypochlorite aqueous solution.

Rhizoctonia sp. can lead to rot in the root and crown of the yacón plant. If 50% of the roots are infected, the plants become unmarketable and inedible. The rot and discoloration occur not only the tubers but also on other plant parts, especially the offsets (“seeds”) and rootstock. Therefore, the use of clean and healthy yacón offsets and rootstocks for propagation are important to reduce disease spreading.

Also, insects like the sunflower caterpillar (Chlosyne lacinia saundersii) can cause damage by feeding on yacón leaves. The presence of natural enemies and trap plants are control strategies to reduce herbivore damage in yacón cultivation. Trap plants, for example sunflowers, can be planted between yacón plants. As they are more attractive to insects, less insects will feed on the yacón plants.

Furthermore, different Badnaviruses infect the yacón plant. The Yacon necrotic mottle virus infects yacón (Smallanthus sonchifolius) and causes necrosis, chlorosis, stunting and malformation of leaves. Yucca bacilliform virus leads to damage as chlorotic lesions on the leaves. The lesions disperse along the leaf veins and increase in intensity towards the tips whereby the lesions gradually turn necrotic.

== Chemistry ==
The chemical composition of yacon varies depending on factors such as location, farming, the growing season, harvest time and the post-harvest temperature.

Yacon tubers consist mostly of water and carbohydrates. The water content is about 70% of fresh weight. Therefore, the energy value is low. The dry matter is composed of out of 40–70% of fructooligosaccharides. Inulin, a low-polymerization β(2-1)-oligosaccharide is the main fructooligosaccharide in yacon. These oligosaccharides are known to be nontoxic, non-digestible and sweet. There are also 15–40% simple sugars as sucrose, fructose and glucose. The most abundant minerals in yacon are calcium and potassium. In addition, yacon juice is rich in free essential amino acids.

Table 1: Chemical composition of yacon root
Components %	Moscatto et al.	Lobo et al.	Riberio
Moisture	7.49±0.17	ND	8.09±1.74
Protein	6.48±0.15	2.64±0.07	4.50±1.26
Lipids	0.31±0.01	0.61±0.02	0.67±0.19
Ash	3.56±0.02	3.85±0.06	2.88±0.13
Insoluble fibre	ND	7.85±0.17	11.79±0.36
Carbohydrate	82.16	ND	ND
Calcium (mg/g)	ND	0.83±0.01	0.22±0.40
Magnesium (mg/g)	ND	0.62±0.09	0.40±0.00

Dry basis

ND Not determined

Carbohydrate was estimated by the difference

Table 2: Carbohydrate composition of yacon root
Carbohydrate %	Moscatto et al.	Lobo et al.	Habib et al.
Fructose	4.13	13.51	26.00
Glucose	1.96	8.97	10.01
Sucrose	3.25	13.42	10.00
FOS/fructans	ND	55.33	52.00
1-kestose (GF2)	8.19	ND	ND
Nystose (GF3)	5.36	ND	ND
Fructofuranosyl-nistose (GF4)	4.03	ND	ND

FOS Fructooligosaccharides

ND Not determined

=== Special compounds ===
Yacon tubers are rich in bioactive compounds, which occur naturally in both the leaves and the roots. Most of the beneficial effects reported from consumption of this tuberous plant result from the presence of such compounds.

The major antioxidative compounds in yacon are chlorogenic acid and L-tryptophan. Yacon also contains different phenolic compounds. The phenolic compounds enable epiphytic bacterial growth with very specific metabolic properties, inhibiting the attack of pathogens. Polyphenols found in yacon leaves and bark produce an acrid and astringent flavour, as well as impart a typical odour. Polyphenols are also substrates for the enzymatic browning of damaged tissues in yacon root, giving it a greenish or black colour due to a condensation reaction of polyphenol compounds with amino acids and the enzymatic polymerization of polyphenols.

== Uses ==
Generally, yacón is cultivated in different countries for food and medicinal use. Since 1960, cultivation has spread from South America to countries such as New Zealand and Japan.

=== Food and storage ===
The tubers can be eaten raw, boiled, dehydrated, roasted or processed into beverages, jams, syrup, vinegar, flour, chips and juice. If they are eaten fresh, they are sweet and crunchy.

While usable-sized edible tubers develop fairly early in the season, they taste much sweeter after they have matured and have been exposed to some frost. After harvest, tubers left in the sun to harden taste much better than those eaten immediately.

The harvested tubers can be stored over several months, however the fructooligosaccharide content decreases over time. If the storage temperature keeps at 1 degree, the turnover from fructooligosaccharides to glucose, fructose and sucrose will also slow down.

=== Medicinal use ===
Yacón is believed to have health promoting effects. The tubers contain phytoalexines, phenolic compounds and high concentrations of fructanes, which are considered as bioactive compounds that are beneficial for human health. The leaves have been shown to be radical scavenging, cytoprotective and anti-hyperglycemic active. There has been considerable research into yacón products for medicinal purposes because of its antidiabetic and hypoglycaemic effect. In Andean folk medicine, yacón is used against liver and kidney disease whereas, in Bolivia, it is used against diabetes and digestive problems.

=== Religious use ===
In colonial times, yacón consumption was identified with a Catholic religious celebration held at the time of an earlier Inca feast. In the Moche era, it may have been food for a special occasion. Effigies of edible food may have been placed at Moche burials for the nourishment of the dead, as offerings to lords of the other world, or in commemoration of a certain occasion. Moche depicted such yacón on their ceramics.

== See also ==
- New World crops
