= Cuisine of Haryana =

Culinary traditions of Haryana

Cuisines and food of the Indian state of Haryana is known to be simple. People of the state prefer their food to be made with fresh ingredients and through simple recipes. Roti (a form of chapati) is a staple food in Haryana, made from a variety of grains and flour (such as wheat, gram flour, and barley). Since Haryana is rich with agriculture and cattle, the use of dairy products is abundant in their food. Many households churn fresh butter from milk and use it as opposed to the butter available in the markets. Lassi (also popular in Punjab) is a popular and staple drink in Haryana. The food in Haryana finds a lot of similarities with its neighboring states Punjab and Rajasthan.
Consumption of non-vegetarian food is generally avoided in the state and sometimes is even considered a taboo among the rural population.

== Common dishes ==
- Kachri Ki Sabzi
- Singri Ki Sabzi
- Hara Dhania Cholia
- Methi Gajjar
- Kadhi Pakora
- Mixed Dal
- Khichri
- Bathua Raita
- Tamatar Chutney
- Besan Masala Roti-Makhan
- Bajra Aloo Roti-Makhan
- Bhura Roti w/Ghee
- Mithe Chawal
- Lassi
- Churma
- Malpuas
- Ghat ki Rabdi
- Bajre ki khichdi
- Hara saag
- Tikde
