= Agave syrup =

Sweetener

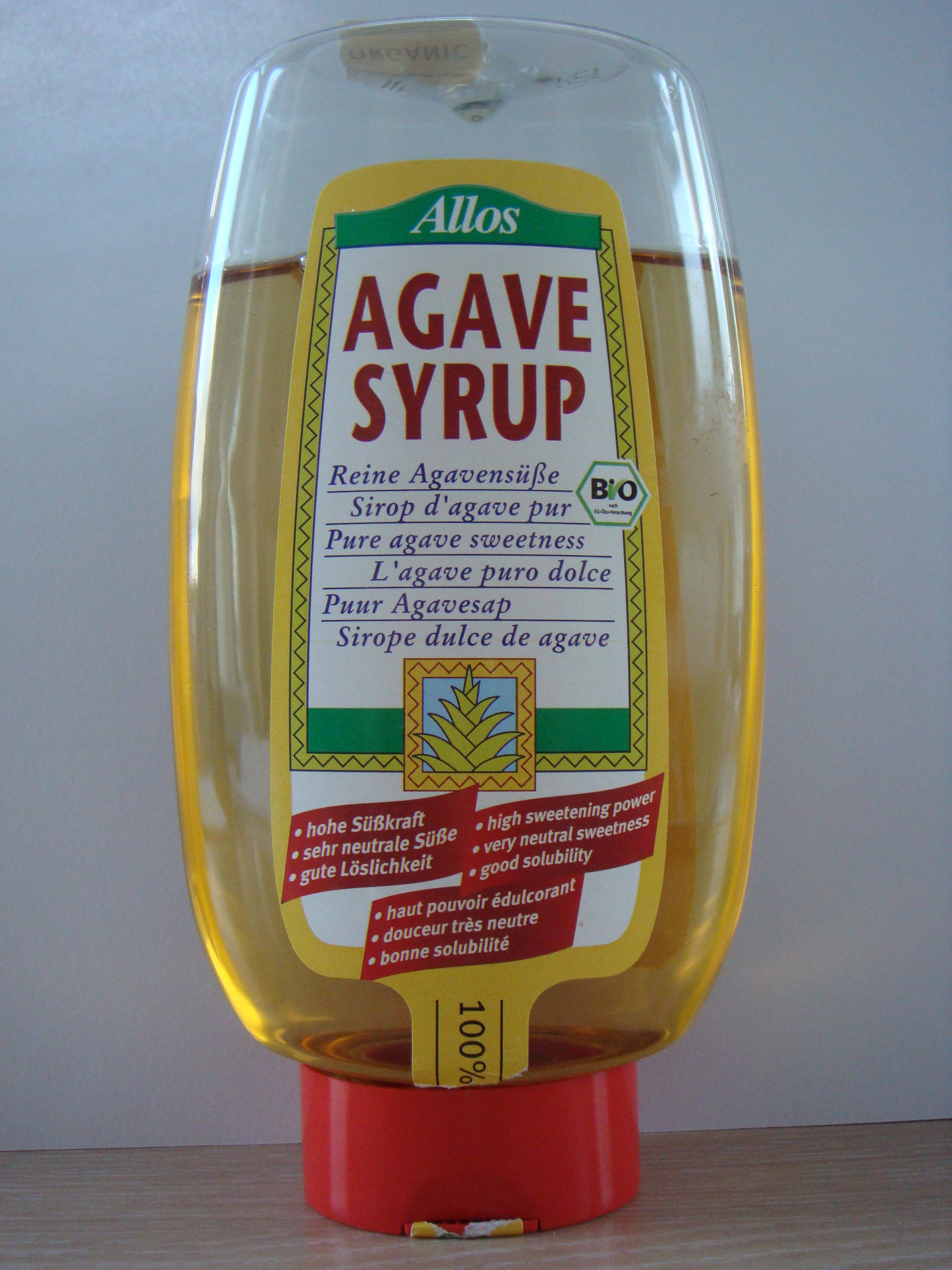
Because agave syrup dissolves quickly, it can be used as a sweetener for cold beverages.

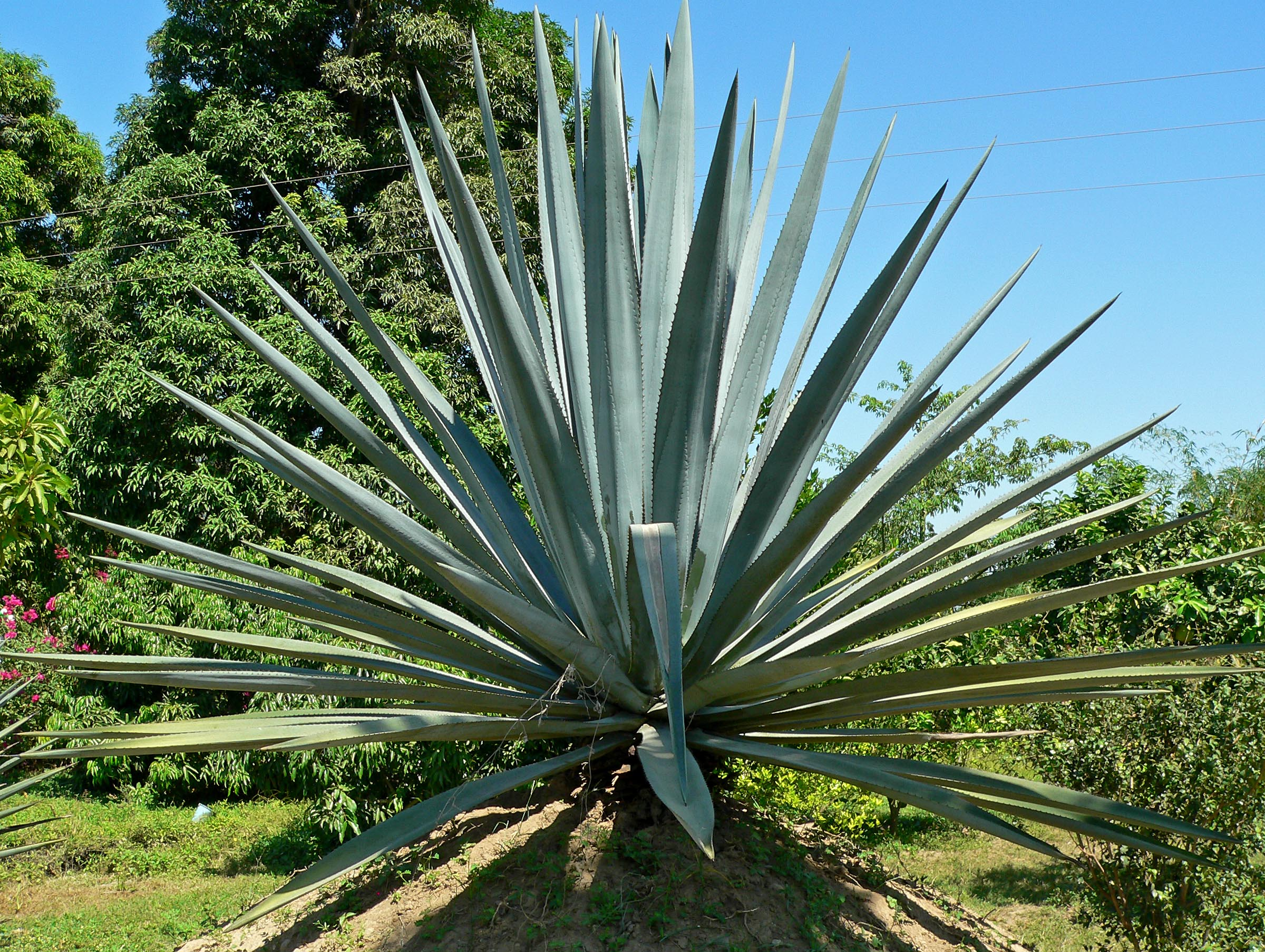
Blue agave or tequila agave (Agave tequilana)

Agave syrup, also known as maguey syrup or agave nectar, is a sweetener commercially produced from several species of agave, including Agave tequilana (blue agave) and Agave salmiana. Blue agave syrup contains 56% fructose and 12% glucose as sugars providing sweetening properties.

== Production ==
To produce agave syrup from the Agave americana and A. tequilana plants, the leaves are cut off the plant after it has been growing for seven to fourteen years. The juice is then extracted from the core of the agave, called the piña. The juice is filtered, then heated to break the complex components (the polysaccharides) into simple sugars. The main polysaccharide is called fructan, a polymer of fructose molecules. This filtered juice is then concentrated to a syrupy liquid, slightly thinner than honey. Its color varies from light to dark amber, depending on the degree of processing.

Agave salmiana is processed differently from Agave tequiliana. As the plant develops, it starts to grow a stalk called a quiote. The stalk is cut off before it fully grows, creating a hole in the center of the plant that fills with a liquid called aguamiel. The liquid is collected daily. The liquid is then heated, breaking down its complex components into fructose, glucose, and sucrose, and preventing it from fermenting into pulque.

An alternative method used to process the agave juice without heat is described in a United States patent for a process that uses enzymes derived from the mold Aspergillus niger to convert the inulin-rich extract into fructose. In slightly greater detail, the polyfructose extract obtained from the mashed agave pulp is hydrolyzed via a chemical process patented in 1998, with inulin enzymes (obtained from Aspergillus niger), to produce a hydrolyzed fructose extract. Concentrating the fructose yields the familiar syrup. Agave syrup (nectar) is listed on the inventory of foods generally recognized as safe (GRAS) by the U.S. Food and Drug Administration.

== Composition ==
The carbohydrate composition in agave syrup depends on the species from which the syrup was made. In A. tequilana (blue agave), the syrup contains some 56% to 60% fructose, 20% glucose, and trace amounts of sucrose, whereas in A. salmiana, sucrose is the main sugar. Fructose molecules in A. tequilana syrup chain together to create fructans and fructooligosaccharides, which have sweetening effects.

== Culinary use ==
Blue-agave syrup is 1.4 to 1.6 times as sweet as sugar, and may be substituted for sugar in recipes. Because it comes from a plant, it is widely utilized as an alternative to honey for those following a vegan lifestyle, and is often added to some breakfast cereals as a binding agent. The specific strain known as blue agave syrup is not recommended for people with fructose intolerance.

Agave syrups are sold in light, amber, dark, and raw varieties. Light agave syrup has a mild and almost neutral flavor, and is therefore sometimes used in delicate-tasting dishes and beverages. Amber agave syrup has a medium-intensity caramel flavor, and is used in dishes and drinks with stronger flavors. Dark agave syrup has even stronger caramel notes and imparts a distinct flavor to dishes, being used in some desserts, poultry, meat, and seafood dishes. Both amber and dark agave syrups are sometimes used "straight out of the bottle" as a topping for pancakes, waffles, and French toast. The dark version is unfiltered and therefore contains a higher concentration of the agave plant's minerals.

== Nutrition ==
Agave syrup (sweetener)
Nutritional value per 100 g (3.5 oz)
- Energy: 1,297 kJ (310 kcal)
- Carbohydrates: 76.4 g
- Sugars: 68.0 g
- Dietary fiber: 0.2 g
- Fat: 0.45 g
- Protein: 0.1 g
Vitamins and minerals
Vitamins	Quantity %DV^{†}
Thiamine (B1)	10% 0.12 mg
Riboflavin (B2)	12% 0.16 mg
Niacin (B3)	4% 0.69 mg
Vitamin B6	14% 0.23 mg
Folate (B9)	8% 30 μg
Vitamin C	19% 17 mg
Minerals	Quantity %DV^{†}
Calcium	0% 1 mg
Iron	1% 0.1 mg
Magnesium	0% 1 mg
Phosphorus	0% 1 mg
Potassium	0% 4 mg
Sodium	0% 4 mg
Zinc	0% 0.01 mg
- Other constituents: Quantity
- Water: 22.9 g
- USDA Database entry
- ^{†}Percentages estimated using US recommendations for adults, except for potassium, which is estimated based on expert recommendation from the National Academies.

In a 100-gram reference amount, blue agave syrup supplies 1,297 kilojoules (310 kilocalories) of food energy and is a moderate source of vitamin C and several B vitamins (table). It is composed of 76% carbohydrates, 23% water, 0.4% fat, and negligible protein.

Having fructose as its primary sugar, blue agave syrup (56% fructose) is similar in fructose content to high-fructose corn syrup (55% fructose content), the most common sweetener used in US manufactured beverages. It contains 12% glucose. In a tablespoon amount (about 25 ml or 25 grams), blue agave syrup supplies 330 kJ (78 kcal), an amount similar to the value per tablespoon for high-fructose corn syrup (290 kJ or 70 kcal).

=== Glycemic index ===
Blue agave syrup has a relatively high sweetness factor because it is composed of 56% fructose, which is sweeter than sucrose. It has an effect on blood sugar comparable to fructose itself, as measured by its low glycemic index (GI) of between 11 and 19.

== See also ==
- List of syrups
- Mezcal
- Tequila
