= Syrup =

Thick, viscous solution of sugar in water

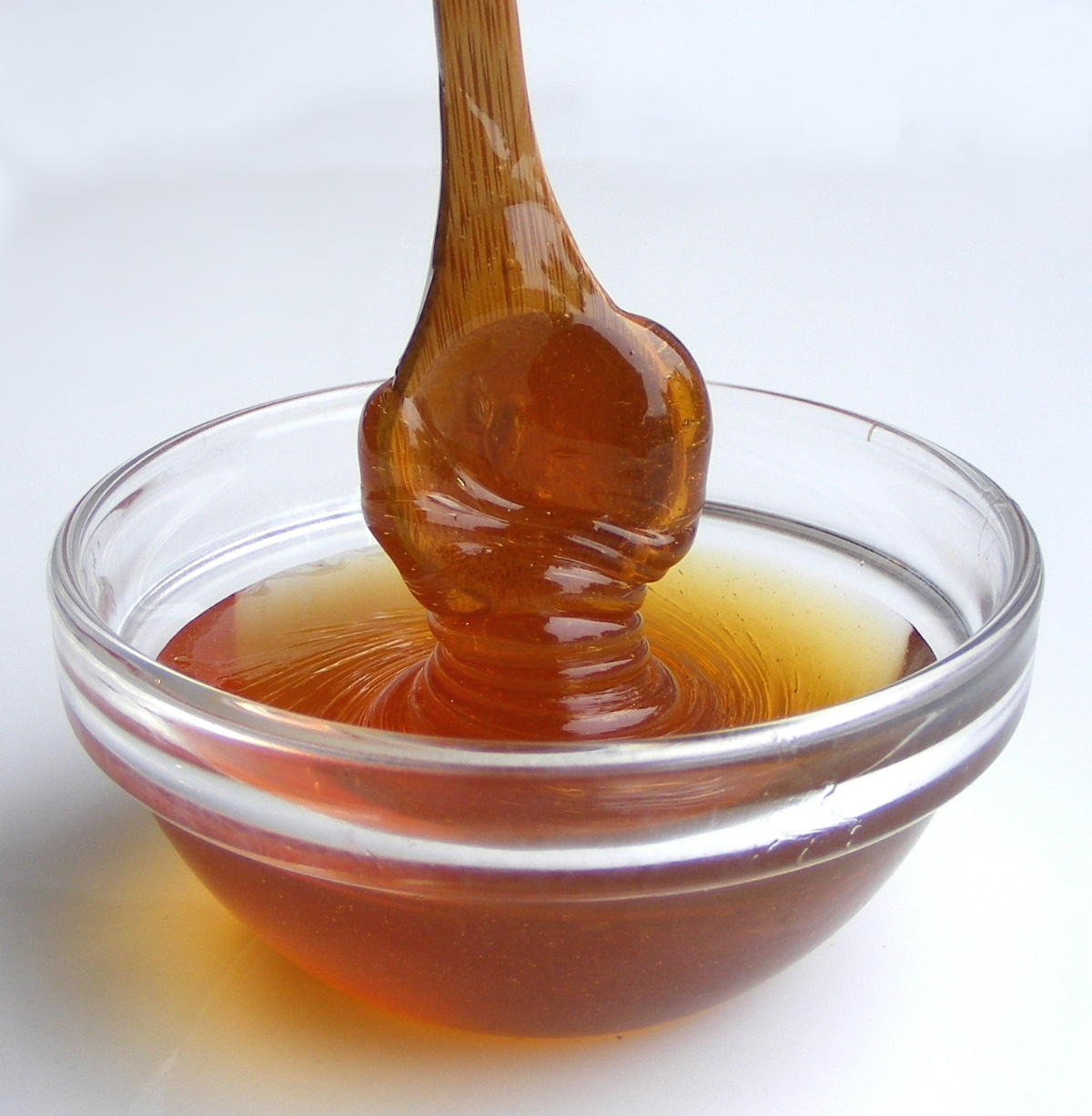
Maltose syrup

In cooking, syrup (less commonly sirup; from Latin: sirupus, from earlier Arabic: شراب; sharāb, beverage, wine) is a thick, viscous, liquid condiment consisting primarily of a solution of sugar in water. It typically contains a large amount of dissolved sugars but shows little tendency to deposit crystals. In its concentrated form, its consistency is similar to that of molasses. The viscosity arises from the multiple hydrogen bonds between the dissolved sugar, which has many hydroxyl (OH) groups.

== Types ==
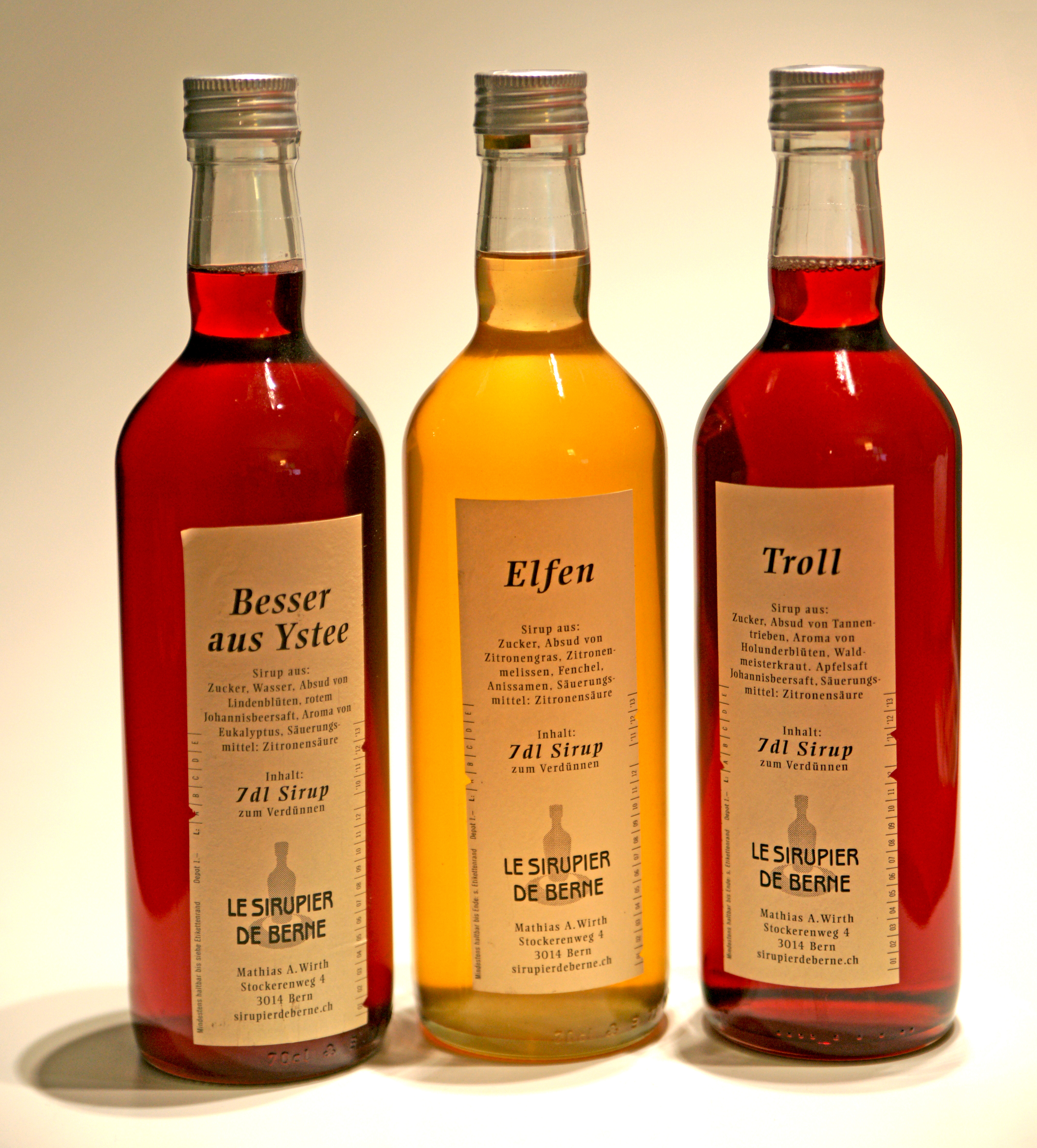
Bottles of syrup

There are a range of syrups used in food production, including:

- Agave syrup, made from agave stem
- Cane syrup, made from sugar canes
- Chocolate syrup
- Corn syrup
- Glucose syrup
- Golden syrup, a by-product of refining sugar cane
- High fructose corn syrup, widely used in the US
- Maple syrup
- Table syrup

== Uses ==
=== For beverages ===
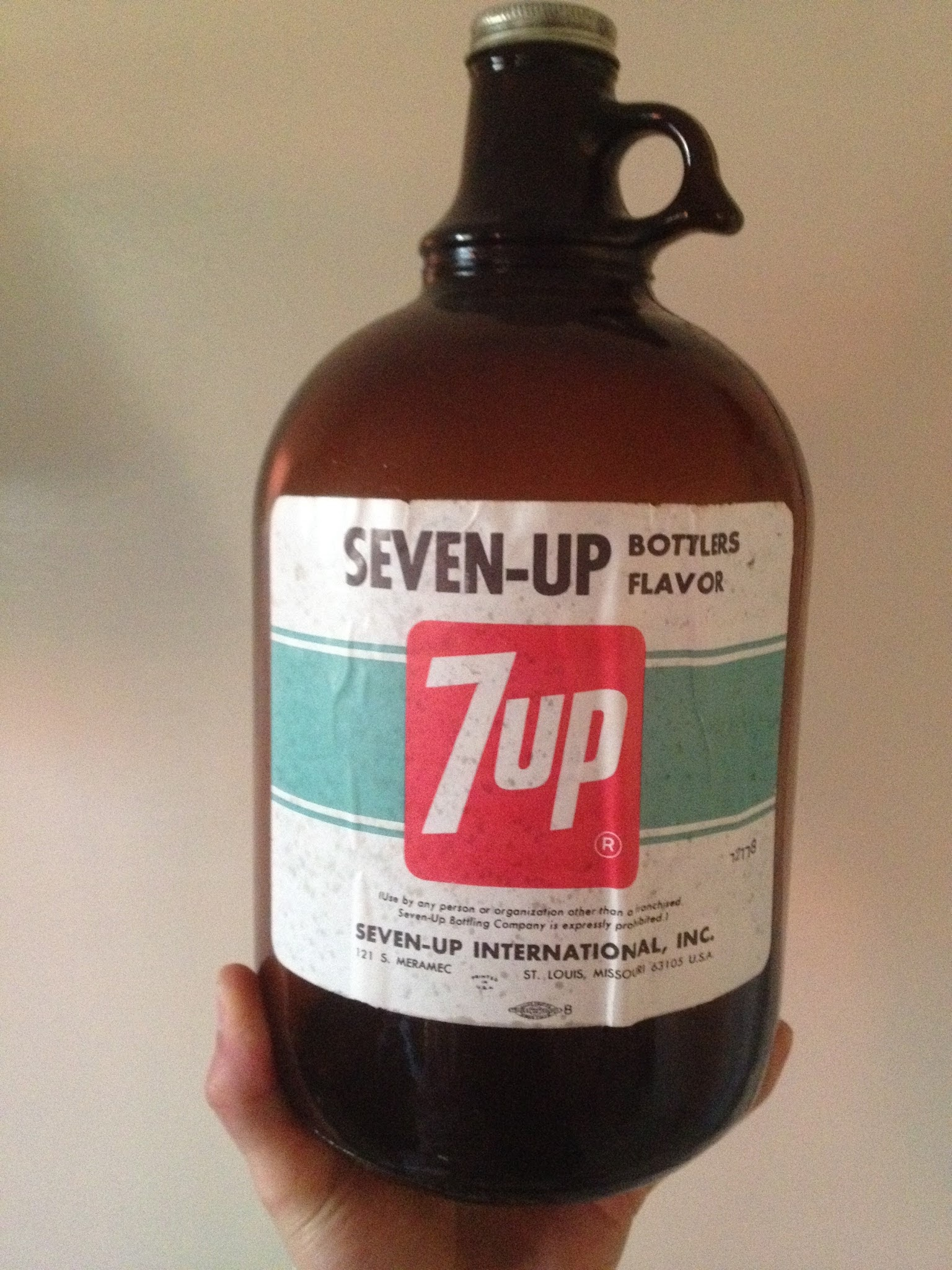
A jug of bottler's flavor for 7-Up. The syrup-like concentrate lacks sugar and is sold to franchisees to refill.

A variety of beverages call for sweetening to offset the tartness of some juices used in the drink recipes. Granulated sugar does not dissolve easily in cold drinks or ethyl alcohol. Since syrups are liquids, they are easily mixed with other liquids in mixed drinks, making them superior alternatives to granulated sugar.

==== Simple sugar syrups ====
===== Simple syrup =====
Simple syrup (also known as sugar syrup, or bar syrup) is a basic sugar-and-water syrup. It is used by bartenders as a sweetener to make cocktails, and as a yeast feeding agent in ethanol fermentation.

The ratio of sugar to water is 1:1 by volume for normal simple syrup, but can get up to 2:1 for rich simple syrup. For pure sucrose the saturation limit is about 5:1 (500 grams (18 oz) sucrose to 100 milliliters (3.5 imp fl oz; 3.4 U.S. fl oz) water).

===== Demerara syrup =====
Combining demerara sugar, a type of natural brown sugar, with water in this process produces demerara syrup. Sugar substitutes such as honey or agave nectar can also be used to make syrups. Spices can be added to the ingredients during the process, resulting in a spiced simple syrup.

===== Gomme syrup =====
Gomme syrup (or gum syrup; gomme is French for "gum") is a boiled mixture of sugar and water, made with the highest ratio of sugar to water possible. In old recipes, gum arabic is added, in the observation that it prevents the sugar from crystallizing and adds a smooth texture. Some recipes omit the gum arabic and thus are only simple syrup, considering the gum undesired or to reduce cost.

Gomme syrup is an ingredient commonly used in mixed drinks.

In Japan, liquid sweeteners for iced coffee are called gum syrup, although they are actually simple syrup which contains no gum arabic. Ingredients vary by brand; some are glucose–fructose syrup, some are sugar, or blends of both.

==== Flavored syrup ====
Flavored syrups are made by infusing simple syrups with flavoring agents during the cooking process. A wide variety of flavoring agents can be used, often in combination with each other, such as herbs, spices, or aromatics. For instance, syrups' aromatics is prepared by adding certain quantities of orange flavorings and cinnamon water to simple syrup. This type of syrup is commonly used at coffee bars, especially in the United States, to make flavored drinks. Infused simple syrups can be used to create desserts, or add sweetness and depth of flavor to cocktails.

=== Feedstock for fermentation ===
Glucose syrups rating over 90 DE (dextrose equivalent) are used in industrial fermentation.

== Production ==
Syrups can be made by dissolving sugar in water or by reducing naturally sweet juices such as cane juice, sorghum juice, or maple sap. Corn syrup is made from corn starch using an enzymatic process that converts it to sugars.

A must weight-type refractometer is used to determine the sugar content in the solution.

== See also ==
- Inverted sugar syrup
- Kithul treacle
- Meringue
- Sharbat
- Squash (drink)
- Stevia
- Sugar beet syrup
- Torani
- Vincotto
- Vino cotto
