= R. Torre & Company, Inc. =

Company making syrups, sauces, etc.

- Type: Private
- Industry: Food & Beverage, Consumer Packaged Goods
- Founded: 1925
- Founder: Ezilda Torre; Rinaldo Torre
- Headquarters: San Leandro, California, U.S., United States
- Key people: Melanie Dulbecco (CEO)
- Products: Flavoring Syrups & Sauces
- Number of employees: 400
- Website: www.torani.com

R. Torre & Company, Inc. also known as Torani, is an American flavoring syrup and sauce company. Headquartered in San Leandro, California, the company was founded in 1925 by husband and wife Rinaldo and Ezilda Torre. In 1925 the Torres immigrated from Lucca, Italy to San Francisco. Mixing flavor with sparkling water in the 1920s, they introduced Italian soda to local cafes, and soon began selling Torani Syrups. Torani's first flavors were Anisette, Grenadine, Lemon, Orgeat or Almond, and Tamarindo.

In 1933, when the Prohibition ended, Ezilda Torre became one of the first rectifiers of distilled spirits in the US. Torani sold products like California Vermouth throughout the Great Depression and World War II. Torani is credited with creating the world's first flavored latte in 1982, combining flavor with espresso and steamed milk.

Torani is currently owned by Lisa Lucheta, the granddaughter of founders Rinaldo and Ezilda Torre and led by CEO Melanie Dulbecco. Torani is partly owned by team members through its Employee Stock Ownership Program. The company employs around 400 people.

From the late 1990s until March 2020, Torani's headquarters, which include both its business offices and manufacturing facilities, were located in South San Francisco, California, until a March 2020 move to San Leandro during the COVID-19 pandemic.
