= Dal badam chakki =

Rajasthani sweet dish

Dal Badam Chakki
- Alternative names: Dal Suphal Chakki, Dal Badam Khandli
- Course: Dessert
- Place of origin: Indian subcontinent
- Region or state: Rajasthan
- Associated cuisine: India
- Serving temperature: Hot or cold
- Main ingredients: Moong Dal, badam, ghee, sugar, mawa

Dal badam chakki or Dal suphal chakki, is a Rajasthani dessert made using Dal (lentil) and badam (almond). It is a specialty of Marwari cuisine and is quite popular in the city of Jodhpur.

It mainly consists of almond, moong dal flour or mogar (gram flour), mawa (condensed milk), ghee (clarified butter) and sugar.

== Etymology ==
The name Dal Badam Chakki or Dal Suphal Chakki is a compound of three words : Dal, Badam/Suphal & Chakki. Dal refers to lentil and Badam/Suphal refers to almonds which are used as main ingredients in the dish. The word Chakki is derived from Sanskrit word Chakrika and refers to cut slice of fudge.
