= Soda machine =

Soda machine can refer to one of the following:

- Soda machine (home appliance)
- A vending machine with soft drinks or other cold beverages; see also full-line vending.
- A soda fountain.
