= Soft drink =

Sweetened non-alcoholic drink, often carbonated

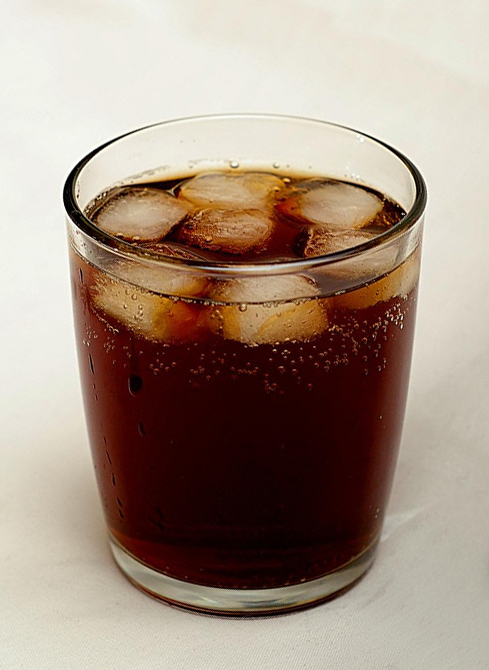
A tumbler of cola served with ice cubes

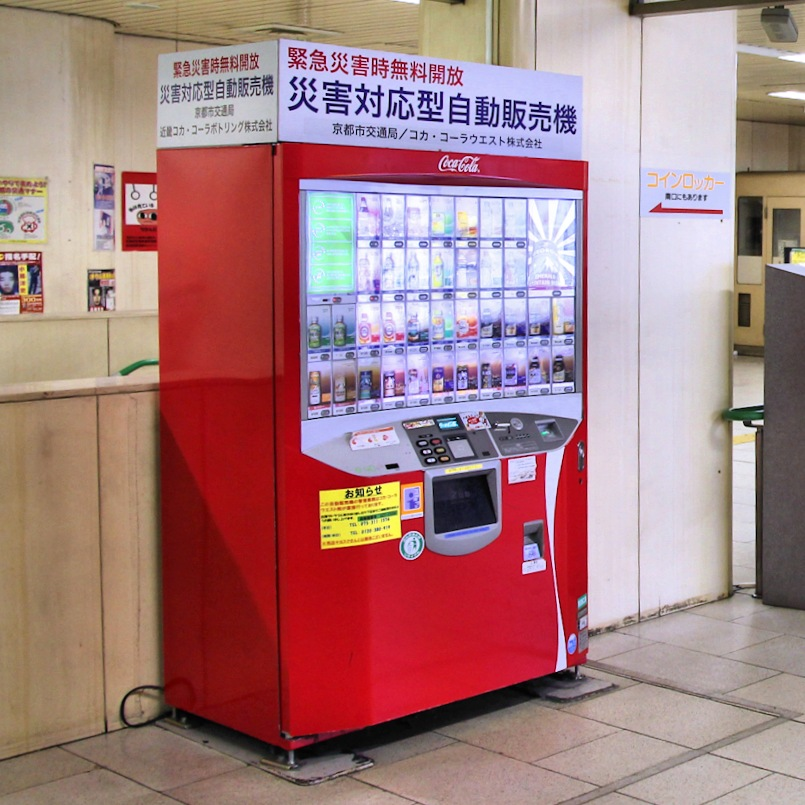
Soft drink vending machine in Kyoto Station, Japan

A soft drink (see § Terminology for other names) is a class of beverage containing no alcohol, usually (but not necessarily) carbonated, and typically including added sweetener. Flavors can be natural, artificial or a mixture of the two. The sweetener may be a sugar, high-fructose corn syrup, fruit juice, a sugar substitute (in the case of diet sodas), or some combination of these. Soft drinks may also contain caffeine, colorings, preservatives and other ingredients. Soft drinks are called "soft" in contrast with "hard" alcoholic drinks and non-alcoholic drinks. Small amounts of alcohol may be present in a soft drink, but the alcohol content must be less than 0.5% of the total volume of the drink (ABV) in many countries and localities if the drink is to not be considered alcoholic. Examples of soft drinks include lemon-lime drinks, orange soda, cola, grape soda, cream soda, ginger ale and root beer.

Soft drinks may be served cold, over ice cubes, or at room temperature. They are available in many container formats, including cans, glass bottles, and plastic bottles. Containers come in a variety of sizes, ranging from small bottles to large multi-liter containers. Soft drinks are widely available at fast food restaurants, movie theaters, convenience stores, casual-dining restaurants, dedicated soda stores, vending machines and bars from soda fountain machines.

Within a decade of the invention of carbonated water by Joseph Priestley in 1767, inventors in Europe had used his concept to produce the drink in greater quantities. One such inventor, J. J. Schweppe, formed Schweppes in 1783 and began selling the world's first bottled soft drink. Soft drink brands founded in the 19th century include R. White's Lemonade in 1845, Moxie in 1876, Dr Pepper in 1885 and Coca-Cola in 1886. Subsequent brands include Pepsi, Irn-Bru, Sprite, Fanta, 7 Up and RC Cola.

== Terminology ==
The term soft drink is a category in the beverage industry, and is broadly used in product labeling and on restaurant menus, the term contrasting with a hard drink (alcoholic drink). However, in many countries such drinks are more commonly referred to by regional names, including pop, cool drink, fizzy drink, cola, soda, or soda pop. Other less-used terms include carbonated drink, fizzy juice, lolly water, seltzer, coke, tonic, and mineral. Due to the high sugar content in typical soft drinks, they may also be called sugary drinks.

In the United States, the 2003 Harvard Dialect Survey tracked the usage of the nine most common names. Over half of the survey respondents preferred the term "soda", which was dominant in the Northeastern United States, California, and the areas surrounding Milwaukee and St. Louis. The term "pop", which was preferred by 25% of the respondents, was most popular in the Midwest and Pacific Northwest, while the genericized trademark "coke", used by 12% of the respondents, was most popular in the Southern United States. The term "tonic" is distinctive to eastern Massachusetts, although its use is declining.

In the English-speaking parts of Canada, the term "pop" is prevalent, but "soft drink" is the most common English term used in Montreal.

In the United Kingdom, the term "fizzy drink" is common, while in Ireland "mineral" is. "Pop" and "fizzy pop" are used in Northern England, South Wales, and the Midlands while "fizzy drink" is used in Ireland. In Scotland, "fizzy juice" or even simply "juice" is colloquially encountered, as is "ginger". In Australia and New Zealand, "soft drink" or "fizzy drink" is typically used. In South African English, "cool drink" is any soft drink.

In other languages, various names are used: descriptive names as "non-alcoholic beverages", equivalents of "soda water", or generalized names. For example, the Bohemian variant of the Czech language (but not Moravian dialects) uses "limonáda" for all such beverages, not only those made from lemons. Similarly, the Slovak language uses "malinovka" ("raspberry water") for all such beverages, not only for raspberry ones.

== History ==
The origins of soft drinks lie in the development of fruit-flavored drinks. In the medieval Middle East, a variety of fruit-flavored soft drinks were widely drunk, such as sharbat, and were often sweetened with ingredients such as sugar, syrup and honey. Other common ingredients included lemon, apple, pomegranate, tamarind, jujube, sumac, musk, mint and ice. Middle Eastern drinks later became popular in medieval Europe, where the word "syrup" was derived from Arabic. In Tudor England, 'water imperial' was widely drunk; it was a sweetened drink with lemon flavor and containing cream of tartar. 'Manays Cryste' was a sweetened cordial flavored with rosewater, violets or cinnamon.

Another early type of soft drink was lemonade, made of water and lemon juice sweetened with honey, but without carbonated water. The Compagnie des Limonadiers of Paris was granted a monopoly for the sale of lemonade soft drinks in 1676, making it the first marketed soft drink. Vendors carried tanks of lemonade on their backs and dispensed cups of the soft drink to Parisians.

=== Carbonated drinks ===
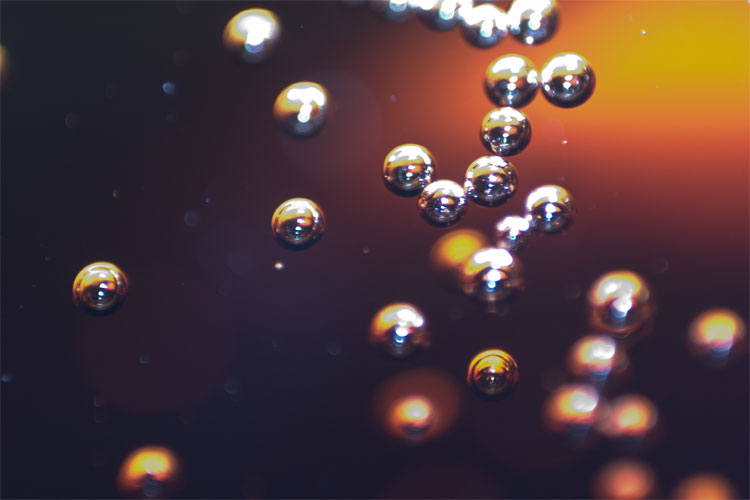
Bubbles of carbon dioxide float to the surface of a carbonated soft drink.

Carbonation moving through a drink, disturbing the ice in a glass

Carbonated drinks or fizzy drinks are beverages that consist mainly of carbonated water. The dissolution of carbon dioxide (CO_{2}) in a liquid gives rise to effervescence or fizz. Carbon dioxide is only weakly soluble in water; therefore, it separates into a gas when the pressure is released. The process usually involves injecting carbon dioxide under high pressure. When the pressure is removed, the carbon dioxide is released from the solution as small bubbles, which causes the solution to become effervescent, or fizzy.

Carbonated beverages are prepared by mixing flavored syrup with carbonated water. Carbonation levels range up to 5 volumes of CO_{2} per liquid volume. Ginger ale, colas, and related drinks are carbonated with 3.5 volumes. Other drinks, often fruity ones, are carbonated less.

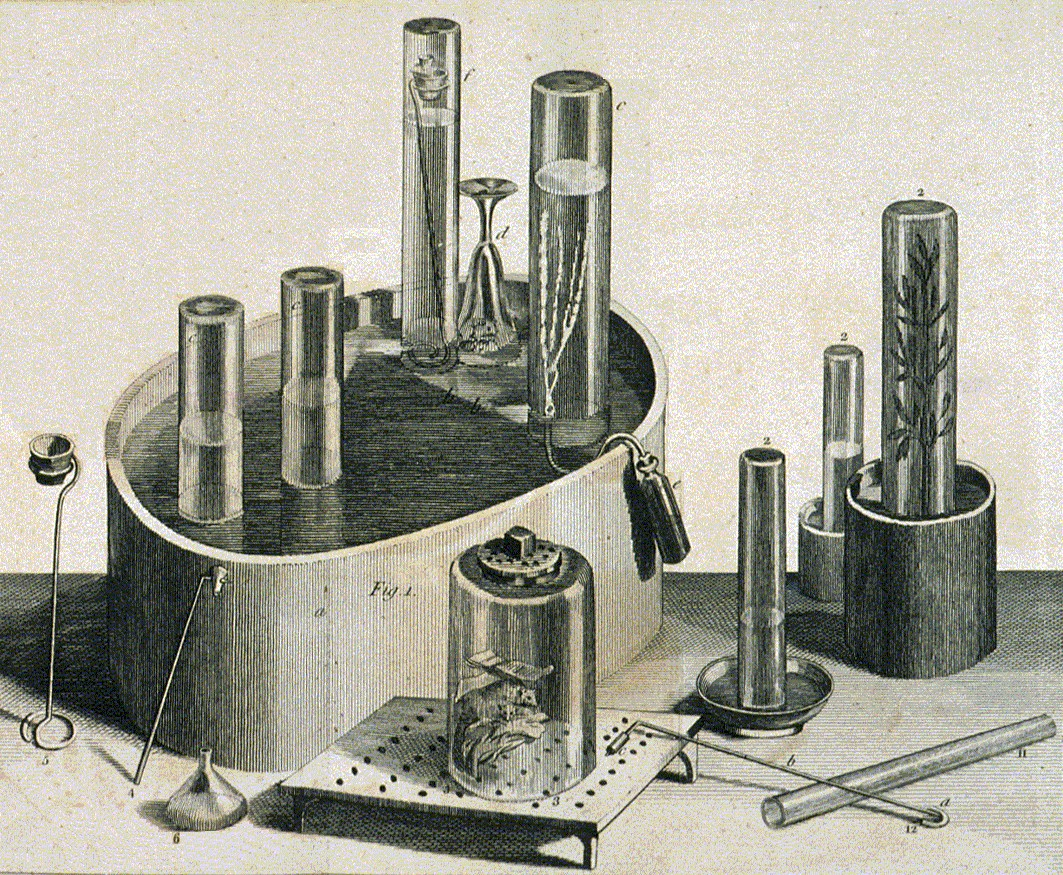
Equipment used by Joseph Priestley in his experiments on gases and the carbonation of water

In the late 18th century, scientists made important progress in replicating naturally carbonated mineral waters. In 1767, Englishman Joseph Priestley first discovered a method of infusing water with carbon dioxide to make carbonated water when he suspended a bowl of distilled water above a beer vat at a local brewery in Leeds, England. His invention of carbonated water (later known as soda water, for the use of soda powders in its commercial manufacture) is the major and defining component of most soft drinks.

Priestley found that water treated in this manner had a pleasant taste, and he offered it to his friends as a refreshing drink. In 1772, Priestley published a paper entitled Impregnating Water with Fixed Air in which he describes dripping oil of vitriol (or sulfuric acid as it is now called) onto chalk to produce carbon dioxide gas and encouraging the gas to dissolve into an agitated bowl of water.

"Within a decade, inventors in Britain and in Europe had taken Priestley's basic idea—get some "fixed air," mix it with water, shake—and created contraptions that could make carbonated water more quickly, in greater quantities. One of those inventors was named Johann Jacob Schweppe, who sold bottled soda water and whose business is still around today."

— "The great soda-water shake up" (October 2014) The Atlantic.

Another Englishman, John Mervin Nooth, improved Priestley's design and sold his apparatus for commercial use in pharmacies. Swedish chemist Torbern Bergman invented a generating apparatus that made carbonated water from chalk by the use of sulfuric acid. Bergman's apparatus allowed imitation mineral water to be produced in large amounts. Thomas Henry, an apothecary from Manchester, was the first to sell artificial mineral water to the general public for medicinal purposes, beginning in the 1770s. His recipe for 'Bewley's Mephitic Julep' consisted of 3 drachms of fossil alkali to a quart of water, and the manufacture had to 'throw in streams of fixed air until all the alkaline taste is destroyed'.

Johann Jacob Schweppe developed a process to manufacture bottled carbonated mineral water. He founded the Schweppes Company in Geneva in 1783 to sell carbonated water, and relocated his business to London in 1792. His drink soon gained in popularity; among his newfound patrons was Erasmus Darwin. In 1843, the Schweppes company commercialized Malvern Water at the Holywell Spring in the Malvern Hills, and received a royal warrant from King William IV.

It was not long before flavoring was combined with carbonated water. The earliest reference to carbonated ginger beer is in a Practical Treatise on Brewing. published in 1809. The drinking of either natural or artificial mineral water was considered at the time to be a healthy practice, and was promoted by advocates of temperance. Pharmacists selling mineral waters began to add herbs and chemicals to unflavored mineral water. They used birch bark (see birch beer), dandelion, sarsaparilla root, fruit extracts, and other substances.

=== Phosphate soda ===
A variant of soda in the United States called "phosphate soda" appeared in the late 1870s. It became one of the most popular soda fountain drinks from 1900 until the 1930s, with the lemon or orange phosphate being the most basic. The drink consists of 1 US fl oz (30 mL) fruit syrup, 1/2 tsp (3 mL) of phosphoric acid, and enough carbonated water and ice to fill a glass. This drink was commonly served in pharmacies.

=== Mass market and industrialization ===
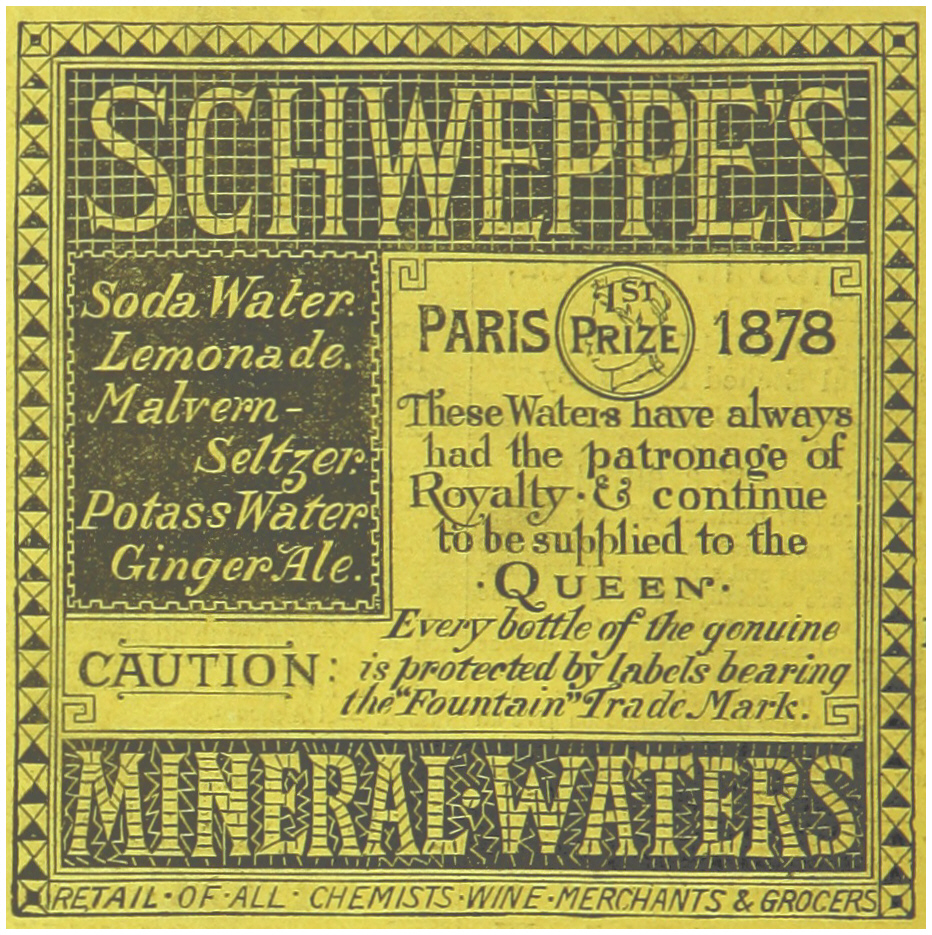
An 1883 advertisement for Schweppes Mineral-Waters

Soft drinks soon outgrew their origins in the medical world and became a widely consumed product, available cheaply for the masses. By the 1840s, there were more than fifty soft drink manufacturers in London, an increase from just ten in the 1820s. Carbonated lemonade was widely available in British refreshment stalls in 1833, and in 1845, R. White's Lemonade went on sale in the UK. For the Great Exhibition of 1851 held at Hyde Park in London, Schweppes was designated the official drink supplier and sold over a million bottles of lemonade, ginger beer, Seltzer water and soda-water. There was a Schweppes soda water fountain, situated directly at the entrance to the exhibition.

Mixer drinks became popular in the second half of the century. Tonic water was originally quinine added to water as a prophylactic against malaria and was consumed by British officials stationed in the tropical areas of South Asia and Africa. As the quinine powder was so bitter people began mixing the powder with soda and sugar, and a basic tonic water was created. The first commercial tonic water was produced in 1858. The mixed drink gin and tonic also originated in British colonial India, when the British population would mix their medicinal quinine tonic with gin.

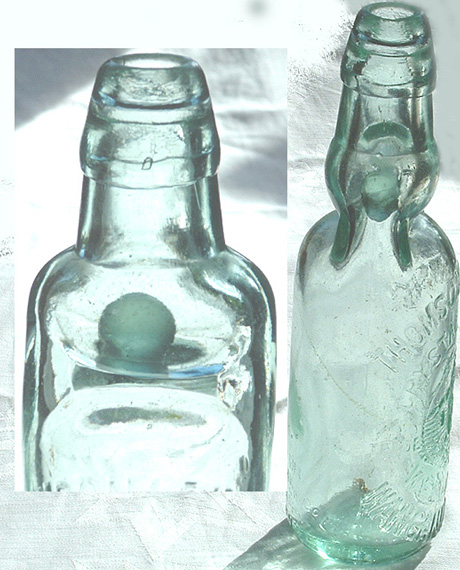
The Codd-neck bottle invented in 1872 provided an effective seal, preventing the soft drinks from going 'flat'.

A persistent problem in the soft drinks industry was the lack of an effective sealing of the bottles. Carbonated drink bottles are under great pressure from the gas, so inventors tried to find the best way to prevent the carbon dioxide or bubbles from escaping. The bottles could also explode if the pressure was too great. Hiram Codd devised a patented bottling machine while working at a small mineral water works in the Caledonian Road, Islington, in London in 1870. His Codd-neck bottle was designed to enclose a marble and a rubber washer in the neck. The bottles were filled upside down, and pressure of the gas in the bottle forced the marble against the washer, sealing in the carbonation. The bottle was pinched into a special shape to provide a chamber into which the marble was pushed to open the bottle. This prevented the marble from blocking the neck as the drink was poured. R. White's, by now the biggest soft drinks company in London and south-east England, featured a wide range of drinks on their price list in 1887, all of which were sold in Codd's glass bottles, with choices including strawberry soda, raspberry soda, cherryade and cream soda.

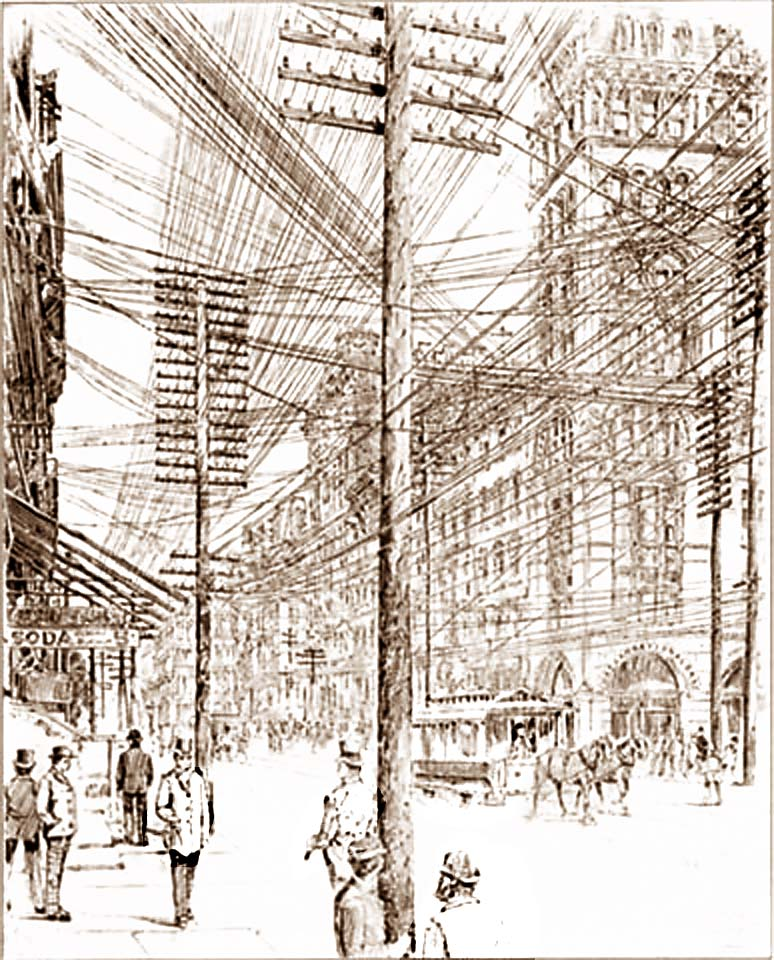
New York in 1890. A street sign "SODA" is visible at the bottom left part of the image.

In 1892, the "Crown Cork Bottle Seal" was patented by William Painter, a Baltimore, Maryland machine shop operator. It was the first bottle top to successfully keep the bubbles in the bottle. In 1899, the first patent was issued for a glass-blowing machine for the automatic production of glass bottles. Earlier glass bottles had all been hand-blown. Four years later, the new bottle-blowing machine was in operation. It was first operated by Michael Owens, an employee of Libby Glass Company. Within a few years, glass bottle production increased from 1,400 bottles a day to about 58,000 bottles a day.

In America, soda fountains were initially more popular, and many Americans would frequent the soda fountain daily. Beginning in 1806, Yale University chemistry professor Benjamin Silliman sold soda waters in New Haven, Connecticut. He used a Nooth apparatus to produce his waters. Businessmen in Philadelphia and New York City also began selling soda water in the early 19th century. In the 1830s, John Matthews of New York City and John Lippincott of Philadelphia began manufacturing soda fountains. Both men were successful and built large factories for fabricating fountains. Due to problems in the U.S. glass industry, bottled drinks remained a small portion of the market throughout much of the 19th century. (However, they were known in England. In The Tenant of Wildfell Hall, published in 1848, the caddish Huntingdon, recovering from months of debauchery, wakes at noon and gulps a bottle of soda-water.)

In the early 20th century, sales of bottled soda increased greatly around the world, and in the second half of the 20th century, canned soft drinks became an important share of the market. During the 1920s, "Home-Paks" were invented. "Home-Paks" are the familiar six-pack cartons made from cardboard. Vending machines also began to appear in the 1920s. Since then, soft drink vending machines have become increasingly popular. Both hot and cold drinks are sold in these self-service machines throughout the world.

== Consumption ==
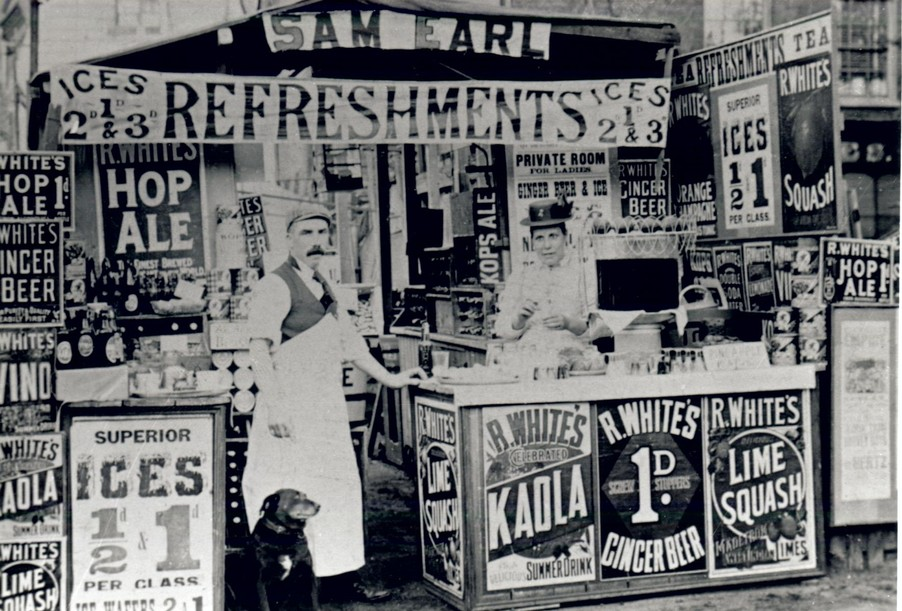
Soft drinks, including R. White's, sold in England in the early 1900s

Per capita consumption of soda varies considerably around the world. As of 2014, the top consuming countries per capita were Argentina, the United States, Chile, and Mexico. Developed countries in Europe and elsewhere in the Americas had considerably lower consumption. Annual average consumption in the United States, at 153.5 liters, was about twice that in the United Kingdom (77.7) or Canada (85.3).

In the mid-19th century, R. White's, one of the first mass produced soft drink brands, was producing 600,000 bottles per day to meet growing demand in England. In recent years, soda consumption has generally declined in the West. According to one estimate, per capita consumption in the United States reached its peak in 1998 and has continually fallen since. A study in the journal Obesity found that from 2003 to 2014 the proportion of Americans who drank a sugary beverage on a given day fell from approximately 62% to 50% for adults, and from 80% to 61% for children. The decrease has been attributed to, among other factors, an increased awareness of the dangers of obesity, and government efforts to improve diets.

At the same time, soda consumption has increased in some low- or middle-income countries such as Cameroon, Georgia, India and Vietnam as soda manufacturers increasingly target these markets and consumers have increasing discretionary income.

== Production ==
Carbonated soft drinks result from the dilution of flavored syrups with carbonated water, typically at a 1:5 ratio. The process of mixing the two ingredients may occur at bottling plants, soda fountains, or manually at soda shops and households. Food-grade carbon dioxide used in carbonation often comes from ammonia plants.

=== Production of syrups ===
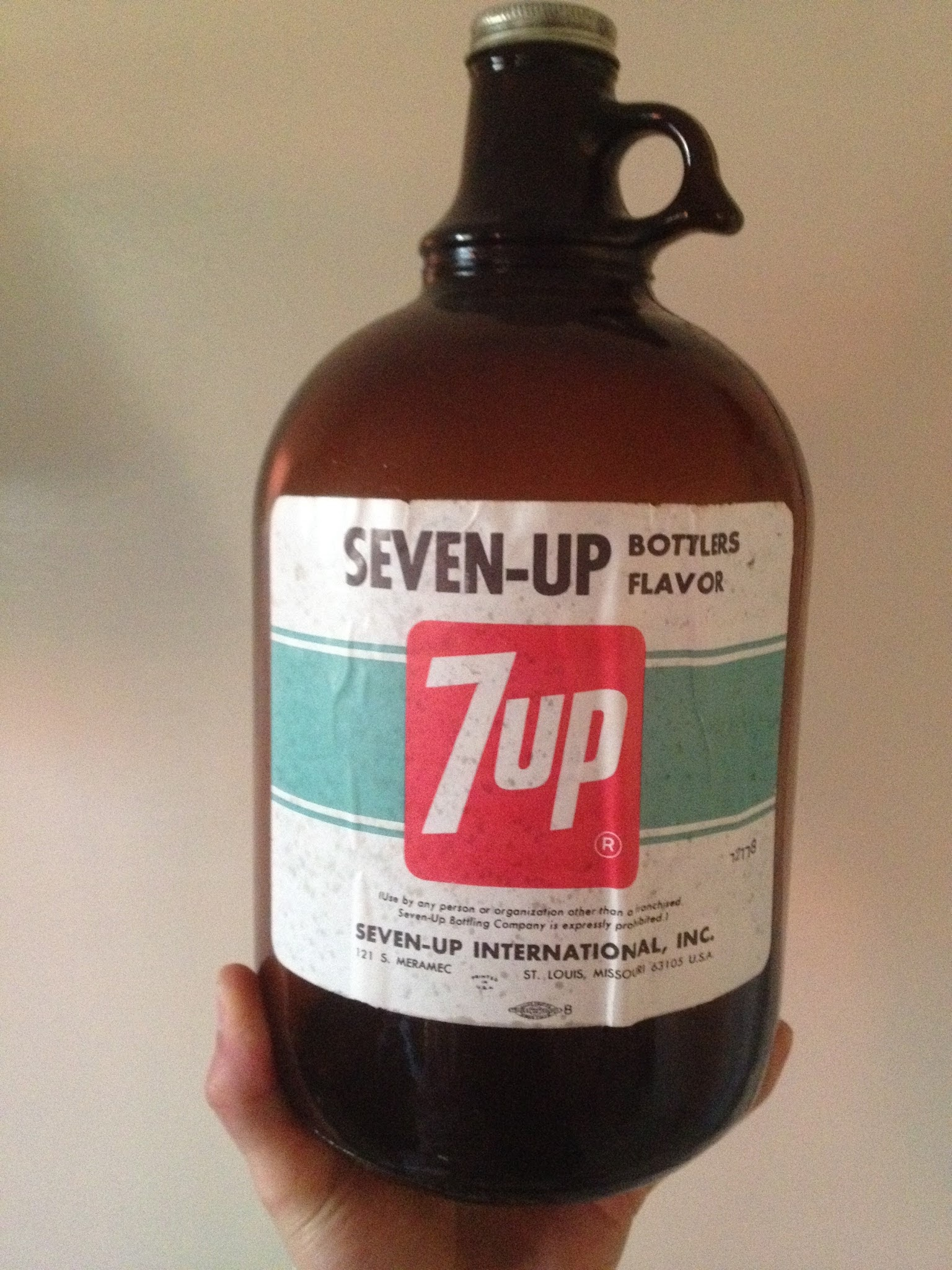
A mid-20th century jug of bottler's flavor for 7-Up. The syrup-like concentrate lacked sugar and was sold to franchisees in such glass containers to produce the soft drink for retail sale.

Commercially produced soft drink syrups derive their flavors from a mixture of food-grade essential oils blended with an emulsifier such as alcohol or gum arabic, extracts, food additives, citric acid (in fruit-flavored drinks such as Sprite) or phosphoric acid (in colas), food coloring, and a sweetener. Regular versions use sugars, while diet versions utilize artificial sweeteners or natural low glycemic alternatives such as aspartame, saccharin, sucralose, cyclamates, acesulfame potassium ("Ace K"), sugar alcohols, stevia, and monk fruit extract. However, most sugar substitutes carry a marked aftertaste often described as "bitter" or "metallic," preventing diet soft drinks from offering a palatably identical substitute.

The ingredients in multinational soft drinks may vary by region according to cost, health concerns, and cultural preferences. The sweetener in mainstream soft drinks varies between high fructose corn syrup, cane sugar, and beet sugar based on regional availability. However, Coca-Cola has replaced its high fructose corn syrup with cane sugar in its American product at the request of the second Trump administration, which claims that cane sugar provides a healthier alternative. The ingredients in Fanta Orange also greatly differ between its American, British, and Italian versions. The American version does not have orange juice and contains high fructose corn syrup, Yellow 6, and Red 40, while the British and Italian versions use sugar and orange juice; the British version only uses natural food extracts as coloring, while the Italian version does not use any added food coloring.

In contrast, small-scale soft drink production typically utilizes ingredients typically found within grocery stores, such as fresh fruit, juices, herbs, and spices. Soft drink recipes designed for home kitchens often substitute essential oils and acids for the raw ingredients that these additives derive from. Small-scale soft drink production may use fermentation derived from yeast, kombucha, and kefir grains to induce carbonation as an alternative to adding carbonated water.

Some soft drinks contain measurable amounts of alcohol from natural fermentation, extracts containing alcohol, and the use of alcohol as an emulsifier. In the United States, soft drinks and other products not subject to alcohol regulations such as non-alcoholic beer may legally contain up to 0.5% alcohol by volume.

=== Distribution ===
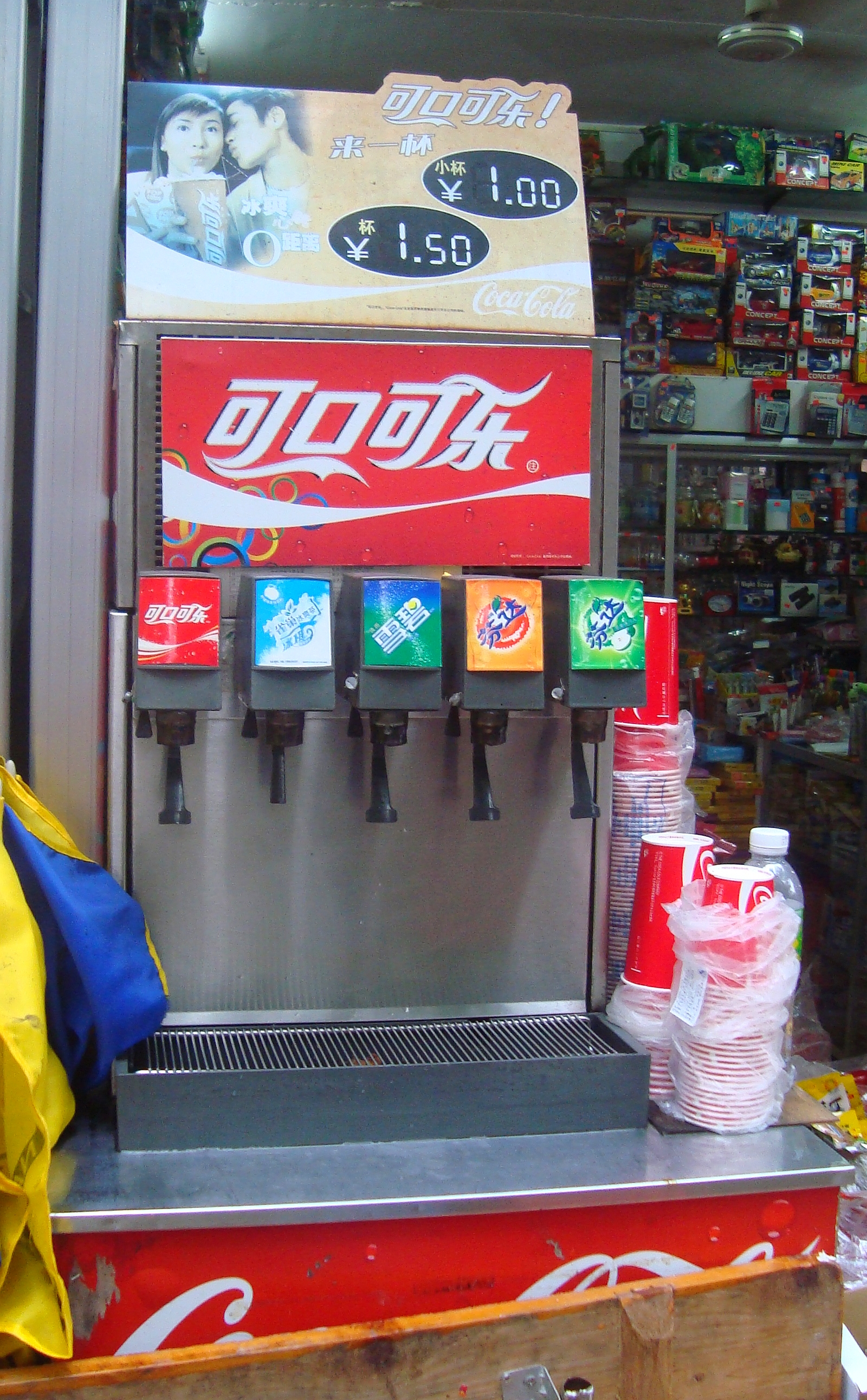
A Coca-Cola soda fountain in Hainan, China, April 2010

Soft drinks sold in aluminum cans and plastic bottles originate from bottling plants where bottling lines carbonate water, mix the carbonated water with premade syrup, fill cans or bottles with the drink, and package them for commercial distribution.

Soda fountains dispense soft drinks by mixing syrups pumped from disposable and interchangeable receptacles known as bag-in-box containers, which simulates the bottling process on a much smaller scale. Prior to the widespread adoption of automated soda fountains in the 1960s, restaurants employed a worker known as a soda jerk or soda clerk who manually mixed pumped syrup with carbonated water with an iced tea spoon in each glass served.

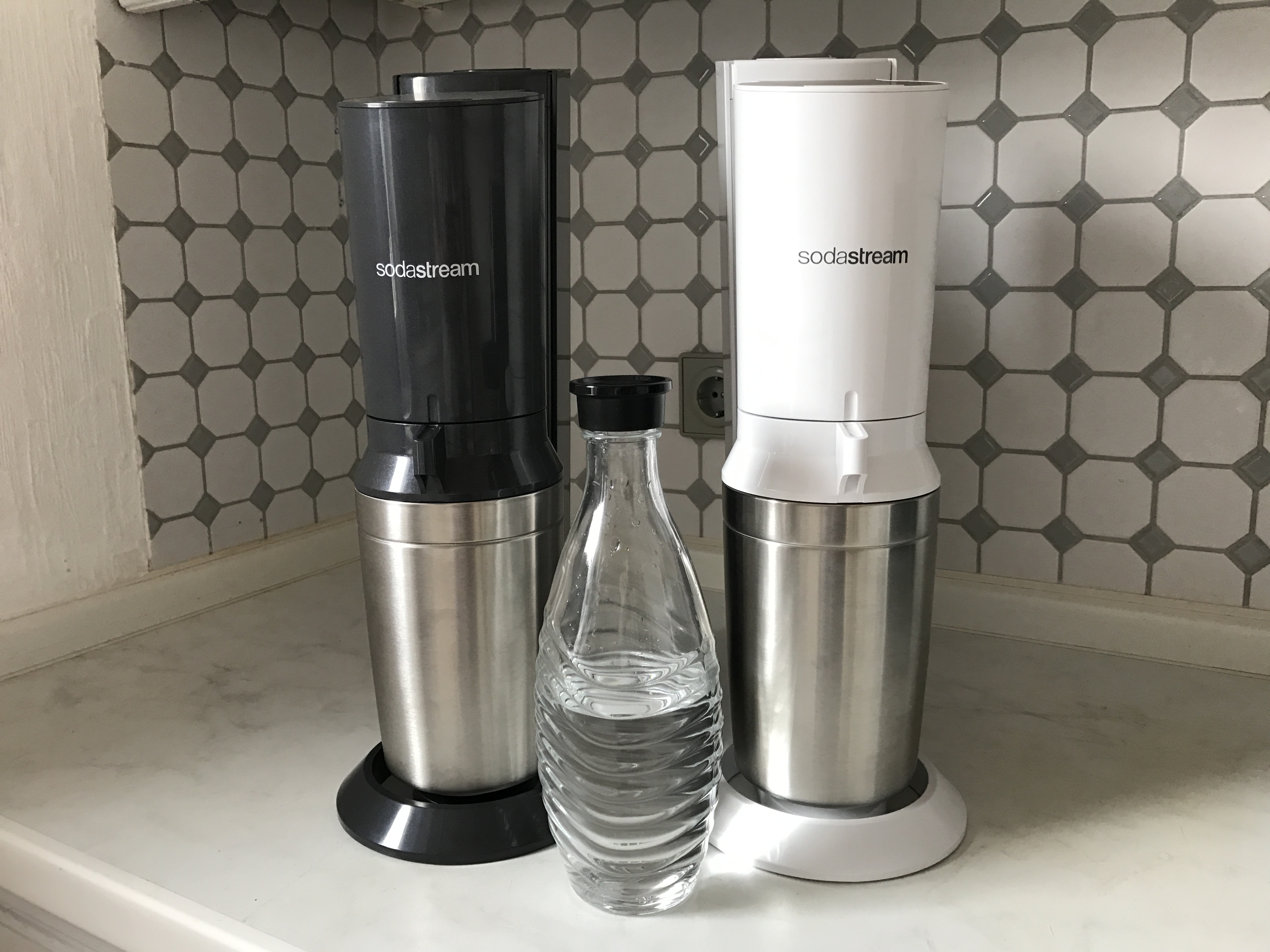
Two soda machines manufactured by SodaStream

Soda machines such as SodaStream carbonate water on a much smaller scale than soda fountains. During the 19th century, the gasogene produced carbonated water by mixing tartaric acid and sodium bicarbonate, but it had a tendency to explode and utilized a surrounding mesh to protect consumers. A machine known as Keurig Kold that mixed carbonated water with flavor pods containing syrup from Coca-Cola Company and Dr Pepper Snapple Group brands existed from 2015 to 2016, but ended production following poor sales. Small scale soft drink production may also utilize premade carbonated water, which may be stored in soda siphons.

== Producers ==
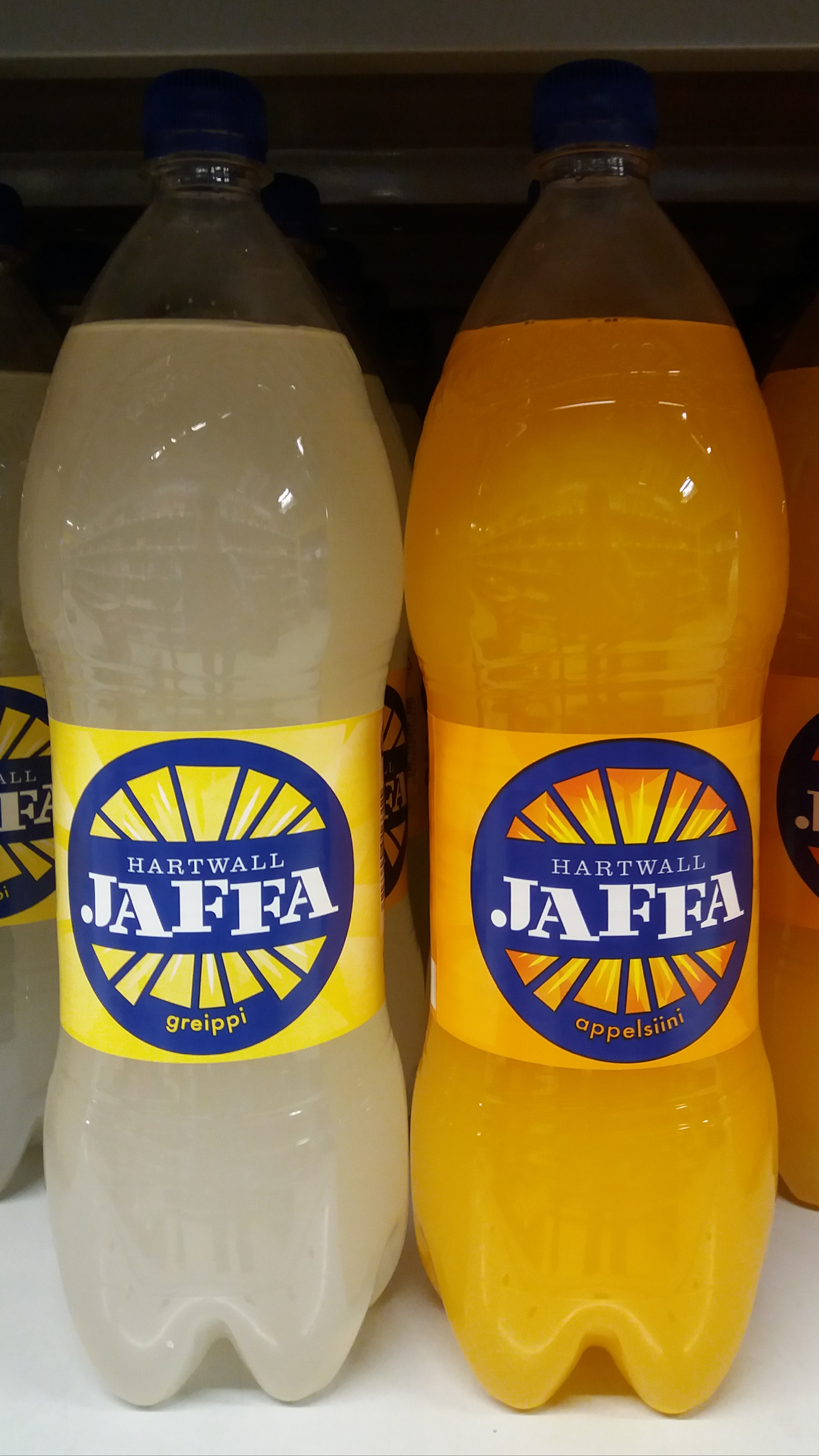
Hartwall Jaffa soft drinks

Market control of the soft drink industry varies on a country-by-country basis. However, PepsiCo and the Coca-Cola Company remain the two largest producers of soft drinks in most regions of the world. In North America, Keurig Dr Pepper and Jones Soda also hold a significant amount of market share. In Scotland, Irn-Bru has been the top-selling soft drink brand for over a century. Formulated in 1927, Lucozade dominated the market in the UK as a carbonated drink to give to patients recovering in hospital before becoming globally known as a sports drink.

== Health concerns ==
The over-consumption of sugar-sweetened soft drinks is associated with obesity, hypertension, type 2 diabetes, dental caries, and low nutrient levels. A few experimental studies reported the role sugar-sweetened soft drinks potentially contribute to these ailments, though other studies show conflicting information. According to a 2013 systematic review of systematic reviews, 83.3% of the systematic reviews without reported conflict of interest concluded that sugar-sweetened soft drinks consumption could be a potential risk factor for weight gain.

=== Obesity and weight-related diseases ===
From 1977 to 2002, Americans doubled their consumption of sweetened beverages—a trend that was paralleled by doubling the prevalence of obesity. The consumption of sugar-sweetened beverages is associated with weight and obesity, and changes in consumption can help predict changes in weight.

The consumption of sugar-sweetened soft drinks can also be associated with many weight-related diseases, including diabetes, metabolic syndrome, and cardiovascular risk factors.

=== Dental decay ===
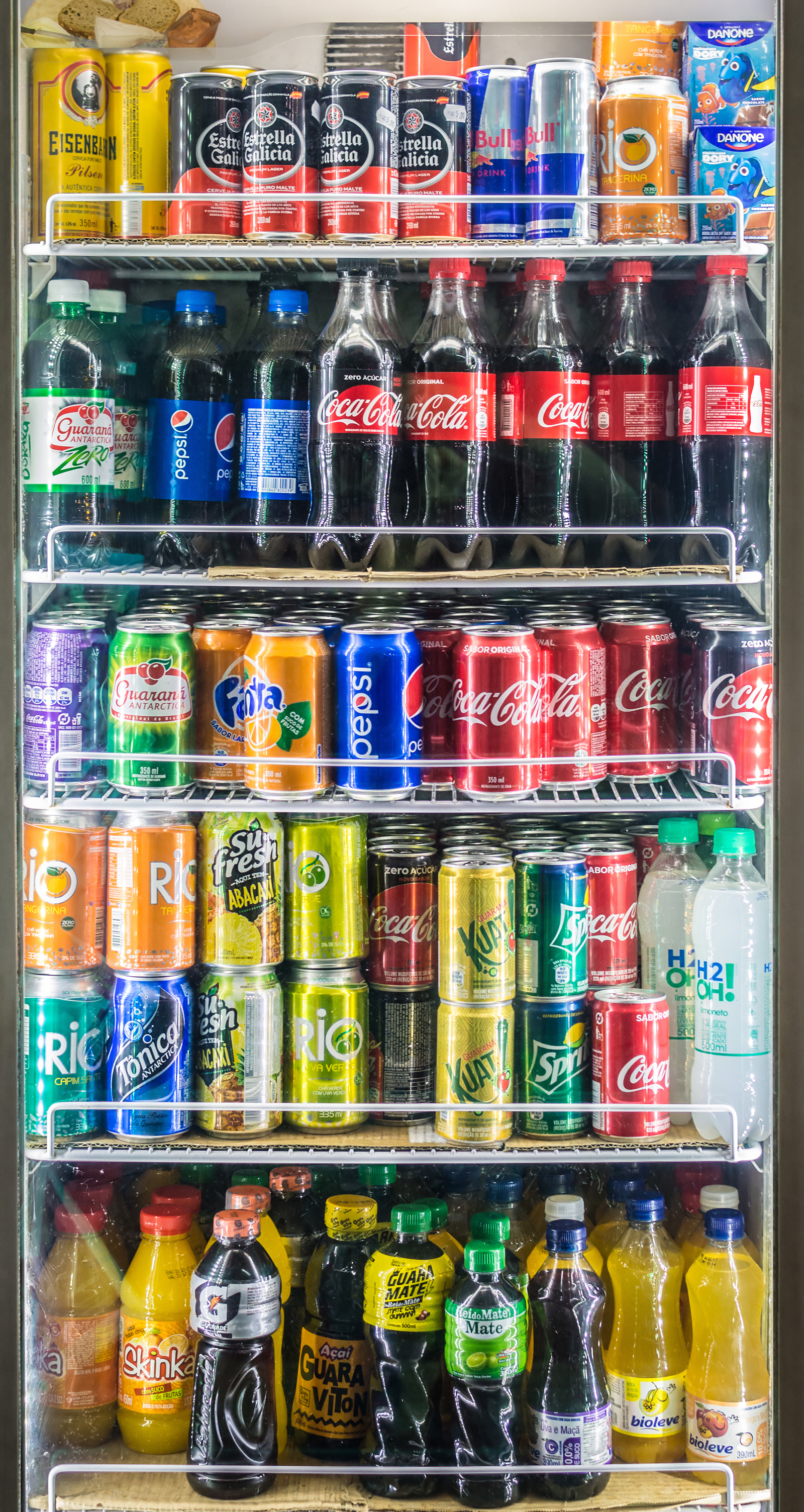
Chilled soft drinks in a cooler in Brazil

Most soft drinks contain high concentrations of simple carbohydrates: glucose, fructose, sucrose and other simple sugars. If oral bacteria ferment carbohydrates and produce acids that may dissolve tooth enamel and induce dental decay, then sweetened drinks may increase the risk of dental caries. The risk would be greater if the frequency of consumption is high.

A large number of soda pops are acidic as are many fruits, sauces, and other foods. Drinking acidic drinks over a long period and continuous sipping may erode the tooth enamel. A 2007 study determined that some flavored sparkling waters are as erosive or more so than orange juice.

Using a drinking straw is often advised by dentists as the drink does not come into as much contact with the teeth. It has also been suggested that brushing teeth right after drinking soft drinks should be avoided as this can result in additional erosion to the teeth due to mechanical action of the toothbrush on weakened enamel.

=== Bone density and bone loss ===
A 2006 study of several thousand men and women, found that women who regularly drank cola-based sodas (three or more a day) had significantly lower bone mineral density (BMD) of about 4% in the hip compared to women who did not consume colas. The study found that the effect of regular consumption of cola sodas was not significant on men's BMD.

=== Benzene ===
In 2006, the United Kingdom Food Standards Agency published the results of its survey of benzene levels in soft drinks, which tested 150 products and found that four contained benzene levels above the World Health Organization (WHO) guidelines for drinking water.

The United States Food and Drug Administration released its own test results of several soft drinks containing benzoates and ascorbic or erythorbic acid. Five tested drinks contained benzene levels above the Environmental Protection Agency's recommended standard of 5 ppb. As of 2006, the FDA stated its belief that "the levels of benzene found in soft drinks and other beverages to date do not pose a safety concern for consumers".

=== Kidney stones ===
A study published in the Clinical Journal of the American Society of Nephrology in 2013 concluded that consumption of soft drinks was associated with a 23% higher risk of developing kidney stones.

=== Mortality, circulatory and digestive diseases ===
In a 2019 study of 451,743 Europeans, those who had a consumption of soft drinks of two or more a day, had a greater chance of all-cause mortality than those who drank less than one per month. People who drank artificially sweetened drinks had a higher risk of cardiovascular diseases, and people who drank sugar-sweetened drinks with digestive diseases.

== Government regulation ==
=== Schools ===
Since at least 2006, debate on whether high-calorie soft drink vending machines should be allowed in schools has been on the rise. Opponents of the soft drink vending machines believe that soft drinks are a significant contributor to childhood obesity and tooth decay, and that allowing soft drink sales in schools encourages children to believe they are safe to consume in moderate to large quantities. Opponents also argue that schools have a responsibility to look after the health of the children in their care, and that allowing children easy access to soft drinks violates that responsibility. Vending machine proponents believe that obesity is a complex issue and soft drinks are not the only cause. A 2011 bill to tax soft drinks in California failed, with some opposing lawmakers arguing that parents—not the government—should be responsible for children's drink choices.

On May 3, 2006, the Alliance for a Healthier Generation, Cadbury Schweppes, the Coca-Cola Company, PepsiCo, and the American Beverage Association announced new guidelines that will voluntarily remove high-calorie soft drinks from all U.S. schools.

On May 19, 2006, the British education secretary, Alan Johnson, announced new minimum nutrition standards for school food. Among a wide range of measures, from September 2006, school lunches will be free from carbonated drinks. Schools will also end the sale of junk food (including carbonated drinks) in vending machines and tuck shops.

In 2008, Samantha K Graff published an article in the Annals of the American Academy of Political and Social Science regarding the "First Amendment Implications of Restricting Food and Beverages Marketing in Schools". The article examines a school district's policy regarding limiting the sale and marketing of soda in public schools, and how certain policies can invoke a violation of the First Amendment. Due to district budget cuts and loss in state funding, many school districts allow commercial businesses to market and advertise their product (including junk food and soda) to public school students for additional revenue. Junk food and soda companies have acquired exclusive rights to vending machines throughout many public school campuses. Opponents of corporate marketing and advertising on school grounds urge school officials to restrict or limit a corporation's power to promote, market, and sell their product to school students. In the 1970s, the Supreme Court ruled that advertising was not a form of free expression, but a form of business practices which should be regulated by the government. In the 1976 case of Virginia State Board of Pharmacy v. Virginia Citizens Consumer Council, the Supreme Court ruled that advertising, or "commercial speech", to some degree is protected under the First Amendment. To avoid a First Amendment challenge by corporations, public schools could create contracts that restrict the sale of certain product and advertising. Public schools can also ban the selling of all food and drink products on campus, while not infringing on a corporation's right to free speech.

On December 13, 2010, President Obama signed the Healthy Hunger Free Kids Act of 2010 (effective in 2014) that mandates schools that receive federal funding must offer healthy snacks and drinks to students. The act bans the selling of soft drinks to students and requires schools to provide healthier options such as water, unflavored low-fat milk, 100% fruit and vegetable drinks or sugar-free carbonated drinks. The portion sizes available to students will be based on age: eight ounces for elementary schools, twelve ounces for middle and high schools. Proponents of the act predicted the new mandate would make it easier for students to make healthy drink choices while at school.

In 2015, Terry-McElarth and colleagues published a study in the American Journal of Preventive Medicine on regular soda policies and their effect on school drink availability and student consumption. The purpose of the study was to determine the effectiveness of a program beginning in the 2014–2015 school year that requires schools participating in federally reimbursable meal programs to remove all competitive venues (a la carte cafeteria sales, vending machines, and stores/snack bars/carts), on the availability of unhealthy drinks at schools and student consumption. The study analyzed state- and school district-level policies mandating soda bans and found that state bans were associated with significantly lower school soda availability but district bans showed no significant associations. In addition, no significant correlation was observed between state policies and student consumption. Among student populations, state policy was directly associated with significantly lower school soda availability and indirectly associated with lower student consumption. The same was not observed for other student populations.

=== Taxation ===
In the United States, soft drinks are considered "food" items and can be purchased using federal Supplemental Nutrition Assistance Program (SNAP) benefits, formerly known as food stamps. Federal law prohibits the collection of sales tax on purchases made with SNAP benefits.

For other consumers, legislators, health experts and consumer advocates are considering levying higher taxes on the sale of soft drinks and other sweetened products to help curb the epidemic of obesity among Americans, and its harmful impact on overall health. Some speculate that higher taxes could help reduce soda consumption. Others say that taxes should help fund education to increase consumer awareness of the unhealthy effects of excessive soft drink consumption, and also help cover costs of caring for conditions resulting from overconsumption. The food and drink industry holds considerable clout in Washington, DC, as it has contributed more than $50 million to legislators since 2000.

In January 2013, a British lobby group called for the price of sugary fizzy drinks to be increased, with the money raised (an estimated £1 billion at 20p per litre) to be put towards a "Children's Future Fund", overseen by an independent body, which would encourage children to eat healthily in school.

In 2017, Saudi Arabia, the United Arab Emirates and Bahrain imposed a 50% tax on soft drinks and a 100% tax on energy drinks to curb excess consumption of the commodity and for additional revenue.

=== Attempted ban ===
In March 2013, New York City's mayor Michael Bloomberg proposed to ban the sale of non-diet soft drinks larger than 16 ounces, except in convenience stores and supermarkets. A lawsuit against the ban was upheld by a state judge, who voiced concerns that the ban was "fraught with arbitrary and capricious consequences". Bloomberg announced that he would be appealing the verdict. The state appellate courts upheld the trial court decision, and the ban remains unenforceable as of 2021.

In 2022, amidst soaring rates of obesity and diabetes, the Mexican state of Oaxaca enacted a ban on sugary drinks, including notably Coca-Cola, but it was poorly enforced.

== See also ==
- Ade
- Craft soda
- Diet soda
- Energy drink
- Fizz-Keeper
- Hard soda
- Industrial gas
- List of brand name soft drink products
- List of soft drink flavors
- List of soft drinks by country
- List of drinks
- Low-alcohol beer
- Nitrogenation
- Nucleation
- Phosphate soda
- Premix and postmix
- Soda fountain
- Sports drink
- Squash (drink)
