= Fair Oaks Pharmacy =

Historic pharmacy in California

Coordinates: 34.1161°N 118.1506°W

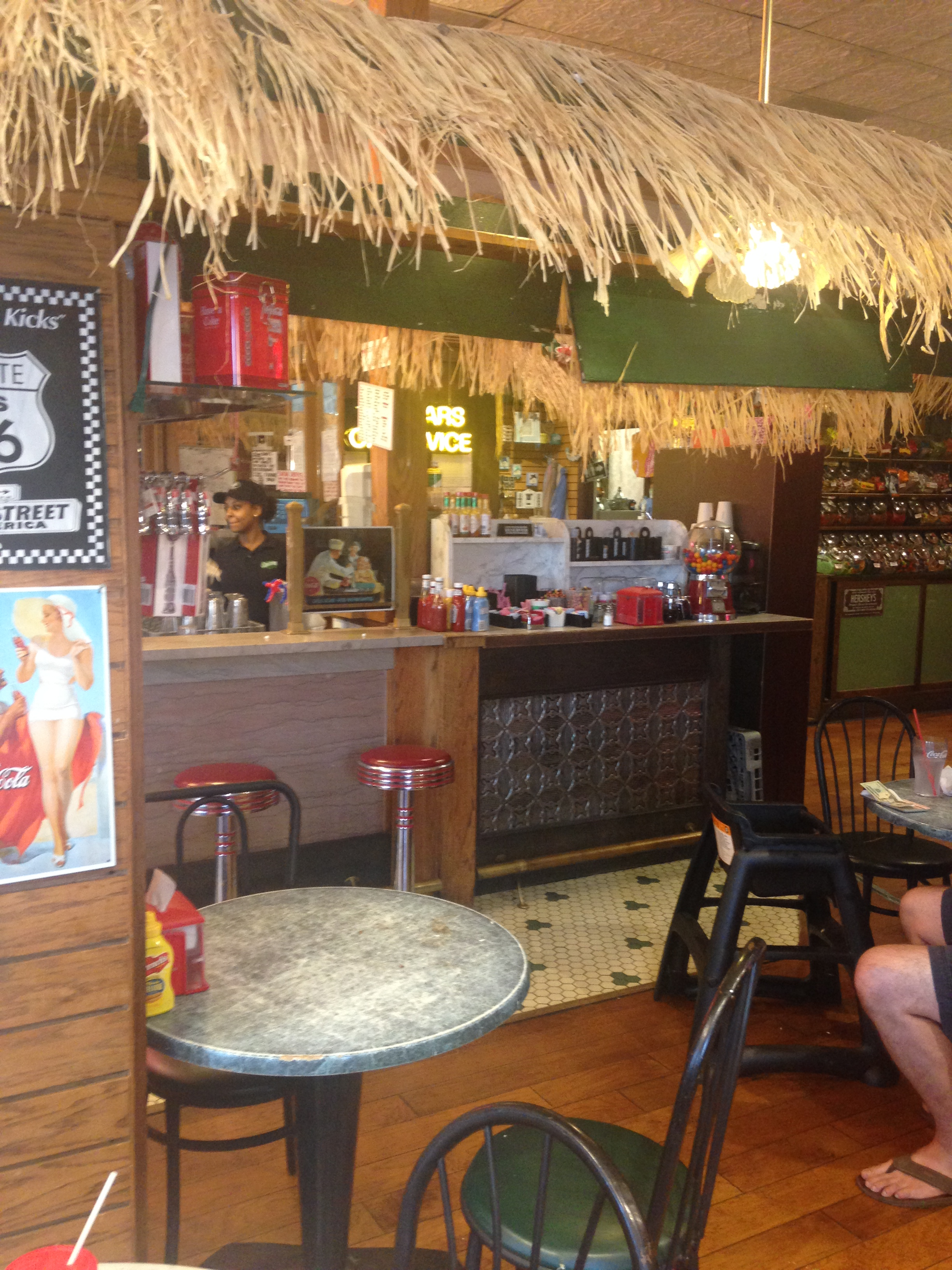
- Interior of the Fair Oaks Pharmacy
- Industry: Pharmacy, soda fountain
- Founded: 1915
- Founder: Gertrude Ozmun
- Headquarters: 1526 Mission Street, South Pasadena, California, U.S.
- Owner: Brandon Shahniani
- Website: fairoakspharmacy.net

Fair Oaks Pharmacy is a historic pharmacy and soda fountain located at 1526 Mission Street, South Pasadena, California. It was established in 1915 and has since become a local landmark and cultural institution.

== History ==
The pharmacy was established by entrepreneur Gertrude Ozmun in 1915 as the South Pasadena Pharmacy. During the 1920s and 1930s, it operated as The Raymond Pharmacy, before being renamed Fair Oaks Pharmacy in the 1940s.

The business became well known as a nostalgic soda fountain destination along historic U.S. Route 66. A husband and wife, the Shahnianis, took over the pharmacy in 2005. It has been under the ownership of their sons, Brandon and Ash, since 2018.

=== Cultural significance ===
The pharmacy has been featured in local media for its vintage design, elaborate candy displays, and signature oversized ice cream sundaes. It is a popular stop for both tourists and locals, evoking a classic 1950s-style American diner atmosphere.

== Menu ==
Fair Oaks Pharmacy serves a wide variety of food and desserts, offering 138 items on its menu. This includes sandwiches, burgers, hot dogs, salads, milkshakes, malts, ice cream sundaes, pancakes, waffles, egg creams, phosphates, and ice cream sodas.

== Gallery ==
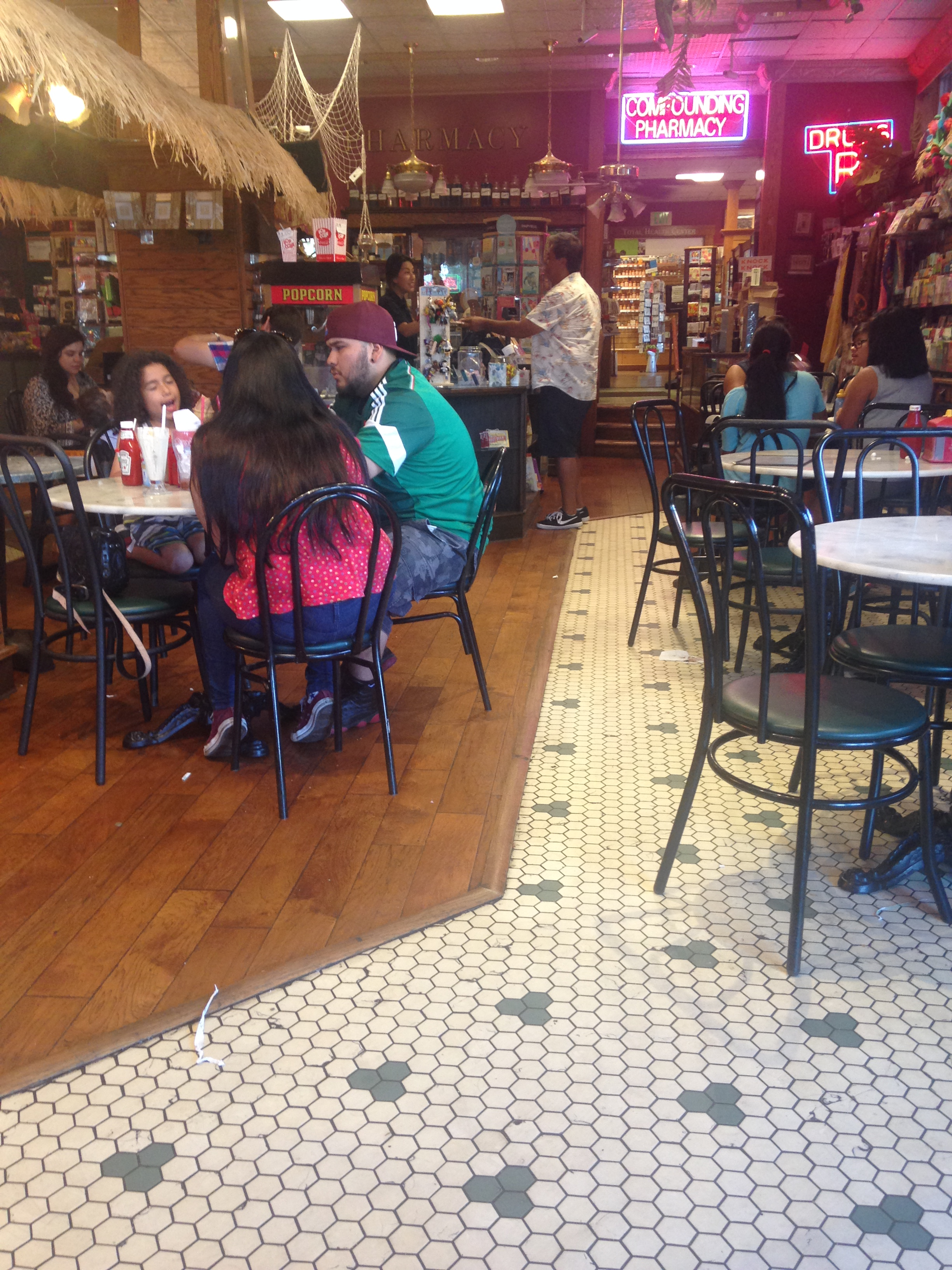
Interior of the Fair Oaks Pharmacy.

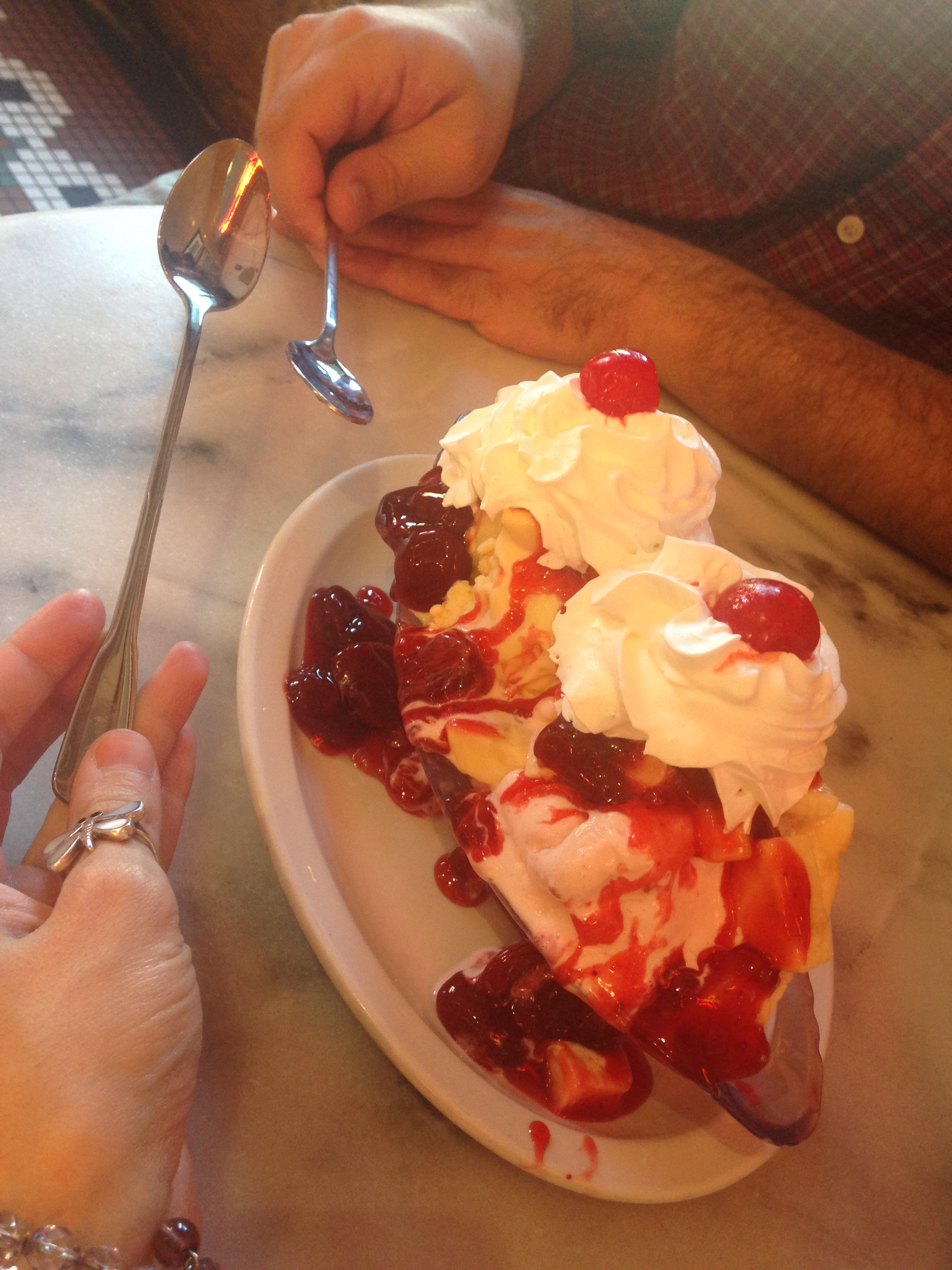
Ice cream at Fair Oaks Pharmacy.

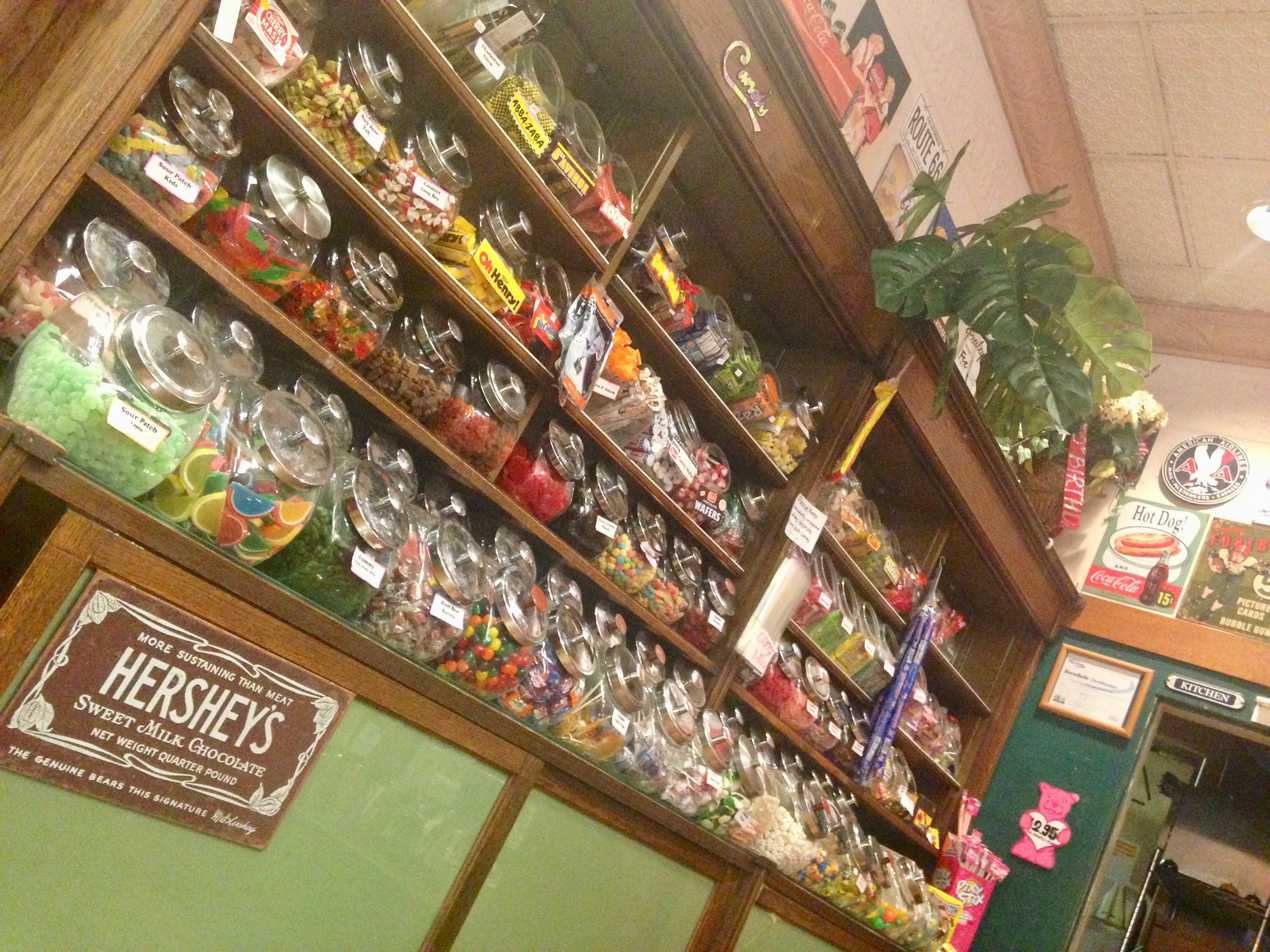
Candy shelves at the Fair Oaks Pharmacy.
