= Soda gun =

Device used by bars to serve drinks

A modern soda gun.

A soda gun or bar gun is a device used by bars to serve various types of carbonated and non-carbonated drinks. A soda gun has the ability to serve any beverage that is some combination of syrup, water and carbon dioxide. This includes soft drinks, iced tea, carbonated water, and plain water. When served from a soda gun, these are often known as fountain drinks.

== History and function ==
The original patent was for a "soda fountain" in 1819. This device was a barrel with a simple pump and spigot system. Pressurization created the carbonation.

=== Comparison with bottled drinks ===
Dispensing from a bar gun instead results in the drink being freshly carbonated at the same temperature and pressure where it will be consumed. By mixing the syrup with water at the last possible stage, the energy for transporting the syrup is minimised, which has implications both for costs and energy. The main benefit for bars is the time − drinks do not need to be retrieved and they can be poured faster than from a bottle.

=== Post-mix soda gun ===
A soda gun with round buttons for Coca-Cola (red), Coke Zero (black) and Lemonade ((white)], and a wider button for soda water.

A post-mix soda gun combines concentrated syrup from a bag-in-box and mixes it with filtered tap water, either carbonated or non-carbonated, at the point of dispense. For a post-mix soda gun to function it must be connected to a bag-in-box system, including pumps, a chiller, water filtration system and a carbonator. Due to the complexity and expense of purchasing and configuring the entire system that runs the soda gun, in most cases the restaurant relies on their beverage supplier to supply the equipment and handle the installation and maintenance. A post-mix soda gun is able to supply any beverage product that can be dispensed in bag-in-box form that does not have pulp.

Each button on the gun has a colour and letter representing a drink. There are often wider buttons for soda water and still water. The Q button is short for quinine, representing tonic water.

=== Pre-mix soda gun ===
Pre-mix soda guns are connected to a simpler system that closely resembles a draft beer system. The drink is supplied to a restaurant in pressurized canisters that are connected to the pre-mix soda gun. Pre-mix soda guns are primarily used in countries where the supply of water cannot easily be filtered to a level suitable for use in a restaurant.
