= Phosphate soda =

Type of beverage

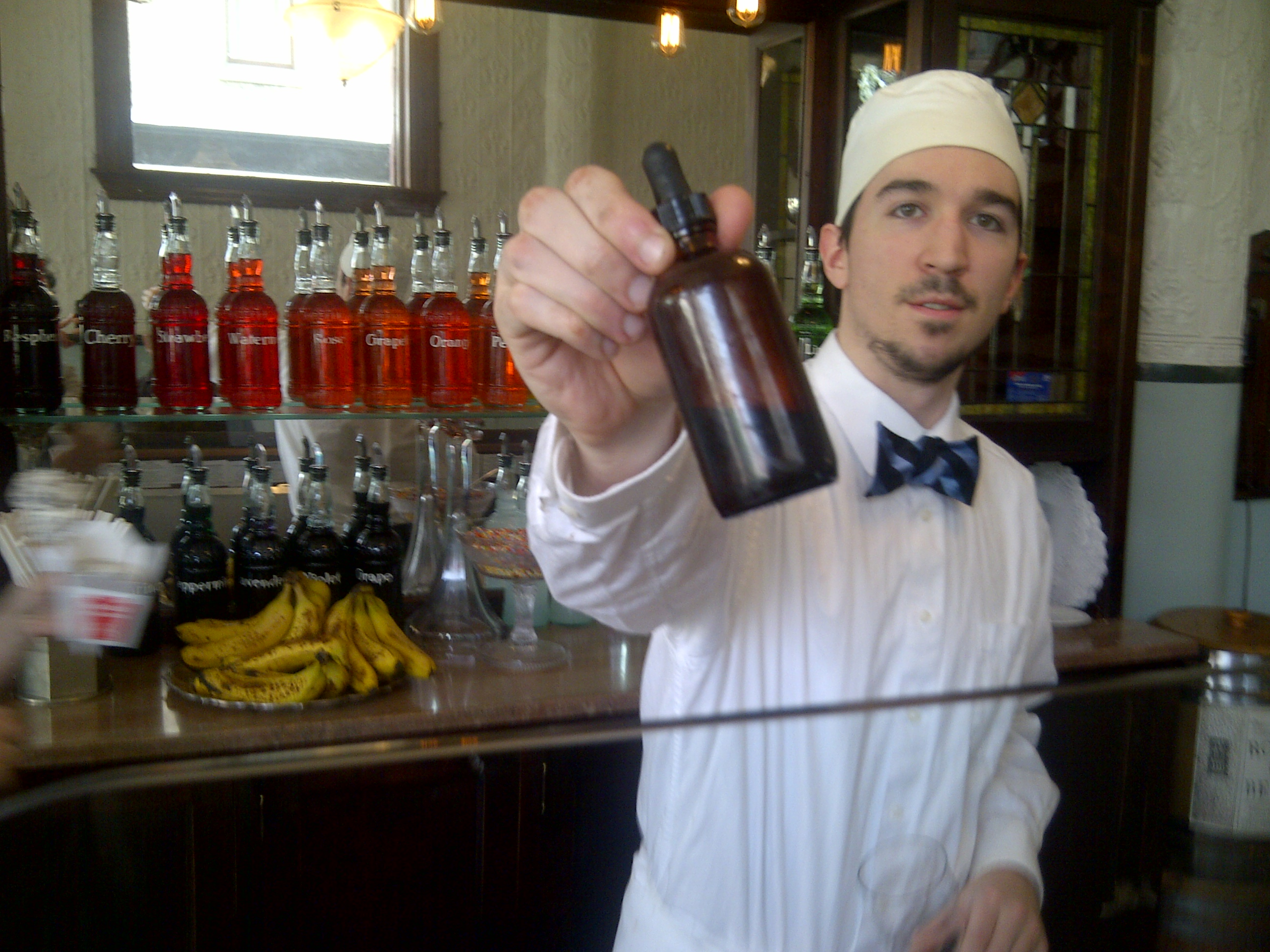
A soda jerk at Franklin Fountain in Philadelphia holds up his phosphate bottle.

A phosphate, occasionally or colloquially called phosphate soda, is a type of beverage flavored with a tangy or sour taste, using phosphoric acid as an additive.

These beverages appeared in the 1870s, following the advent of development by Harvard professor Eben N. Horsford of a process for "acid phosphates of lime" (patented 1868, later voided), and began promoting it as a health product. Some businesses realized that the taste of it was quite palatable to consumers when combined with sugar and water, and some innovator came up with the idea of combining it with fruit syrup and soda water, creating a new soda fountain drink.

The standard types were the lemon and orange phosphates, but there were also egg phosphates with raw egg mixed in, or versions with malt extract, or wine, in combination with seltzer (carbonated water). By the 1900s, the beverages became one of the most popular drinks, so much so that "lemon soda" had become obsolete and non cost-effective, overtaken by "lemon phosphate" which became a top-seller at the soda fountain, which were also often installed at drug stores. Phosphates were initially considered a "masculine" kind of soda, in contrast to the more "feminine" dairy-based beverages. However, this gender stereotype would soon dissolve, and phosphates continued to be popular with all genders until the 1930s, when the soda fountain trend shifted to ice cream-based parlor drinks.

Phosphoric acid is still used in many bottled soft drinks, including Coca-Cola. The original acid phosphate, made by Horsford's chemical company, was a mixture of calcium, magnesium and potassium phosphate salts with a small amount of phosphoric acid, producing a liquid mixture with a pH of around 2 to 3, the same as freshly squeezed lime juice.

Horsford used bone ash, which is mostly calcium phosphate. In the 21st century, bone ash is used primarily in the ceramics industry, and is rarely available as food grade stock. The ingredients can, however, be synthesized from modern food-grade chemicals.
