= Soda machine (home appliance) =

Home appliance for carbonating tap water

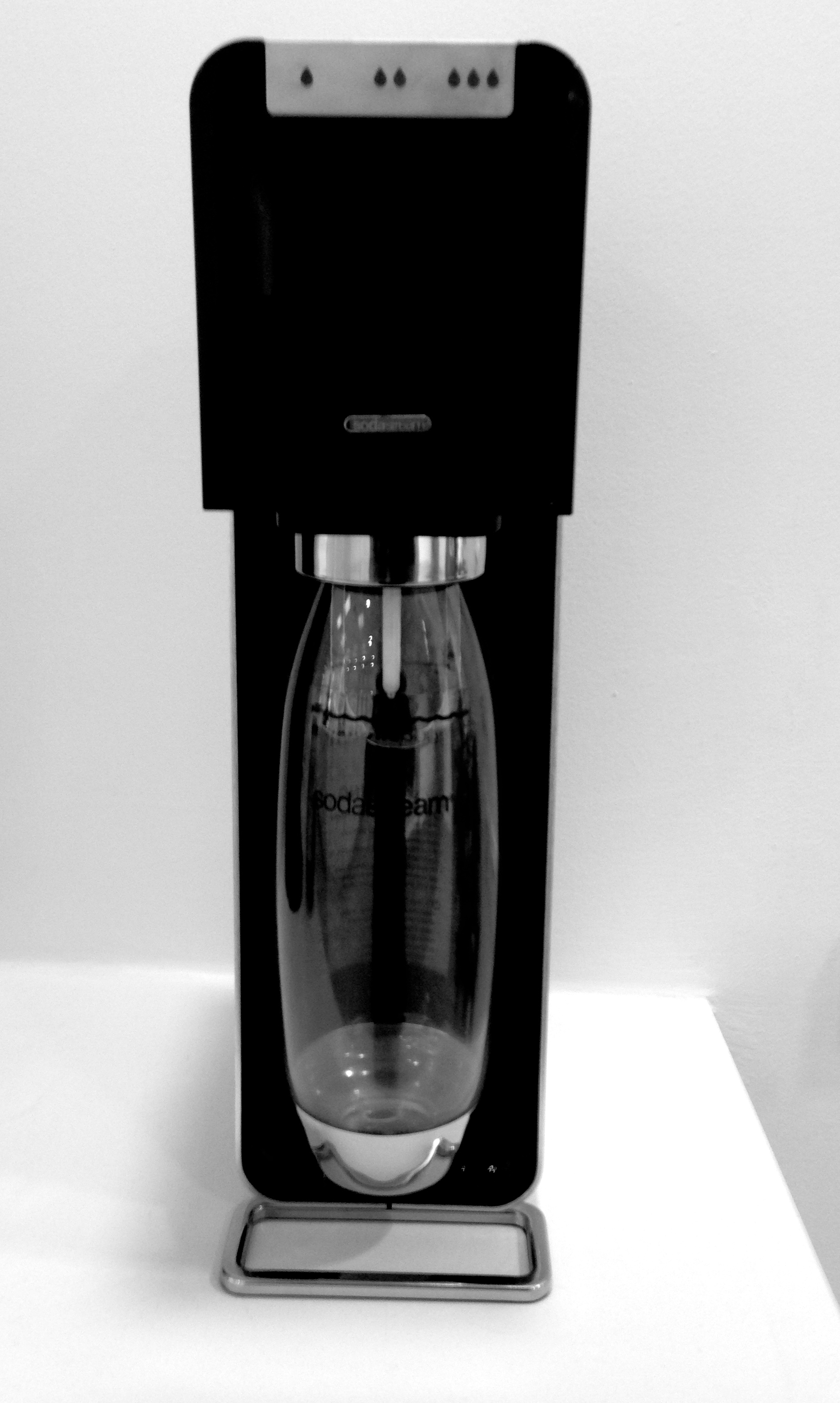
Soda machine

A soda machine or soda maker is a home appliance for carbonating tap water by using carbon dioxide from a pressurized cartridge. The machine is often delivered with flavorings; these can be added to the water after it is carbonated to make soda, such as orange, lemon, or cola flavours. Some brands are able to directly carbonate any cold beverage.

Examples of well known soda machine manufacturers are SodaStream of Israel, DrinkMate of the United States, and Aqvia by AGA of Sweden.

Soda machines are often either connected to a dedicated water tap in the house, or configured as a freestanding unit. Some refrigerators are delivered with a built-in soda machine.

== Construction ==
Soda machines normally use refillable TR21-4 thread gas cartridges, which are normally filled with 410 grams of carbon dioxide. The water to be carbonated is filled in special pressure resistant bottles which are attached to the machine in a pressure proof way. The gas is then added to the water via a pipe and valve system which is activated by pushing a button. The resulting amount of carbon dioxide is determined by the pressure in the CO_{2} cartridge and how long the button is held down. If the pressure is too large, residual pressure is relieved through a blowoff valve.

== Advantages ==
Depending on the size of the gas cartridge, a soda machine can produce up to 100 liters of carbonated water before the cartridge needs to be replaced. Compared to buying carbonated water in the store, this eliminates packaging and transportation costs, and also results in less waste and possible less use of storage space. Consumer Reports estimated that a SodaStream Fizzi would save a consumer $233 and 1,248 cans at the end of two years.

Gas cartridges and compatible water bottles can be purchased in many super markets. The pressure resistant bottles can also be used to store the carbonated water. Some newer machines can also be used with glass bottles. Some newer PEN-bottles can also be machine washed.

== Flavoring ==
Makers of soda machines also offer a selection of flavors which can be added after the water has been carbonated. Some of these are sugar free. Alternatively, normal squash can be used. The DrinkMate maker allows users to directly carbonate flavored beverages (such as Gatorade, juice, wine, and flat soda).

== Health risks ==
=== Teeth ===
Carbonated water has a low pH-value, and overuse of carbonated water can therefore lead to acid erosion of the teeth, similarly to consuming other sour beverages and food (like soda or fruits). A 2017 study by the American Dental Association showed that, although seltzer water is more erosive than tap water, it would take over 100 years of daily drinking to cause damage to human teeth. Drinking straws can be used to prevent acid erosion by minimizing direct contact between the sour drink and the teeth.

=== Bacteria ===
In a study by the Institute of Hygiene and Environmental Medicine at the University of Mainz, (Germany), blue coliform bacteria were found in 39% of the tests when water was carbonated in soda machines, compared to 12% in the tests of water straight from the tap. In addition to the pollution contaminants from the gas cartridge or the machine itself, the water's microbiological quality was also poorer due to a biofilm on the inside of the bottles.

In addition to insufficient cleaning (by not following the manufacturer instructions), a possible cause for the increased amount of bacteria could also be the poor design of the soda machines.

It is recommended to regularly perform simple cleaning routines according to the manufacturer instructions. This includes cleaning the bottles with hot water (above 50 °C), using soap and a clean cleaning brush.

== Product recalls ==
In 2025, the Drinkmate brand recalled over 100,000 1-liter carbonation bottles due to an explosion hazard while in use, posing potential for serious cuts and hearing damage.

== Gallery ==
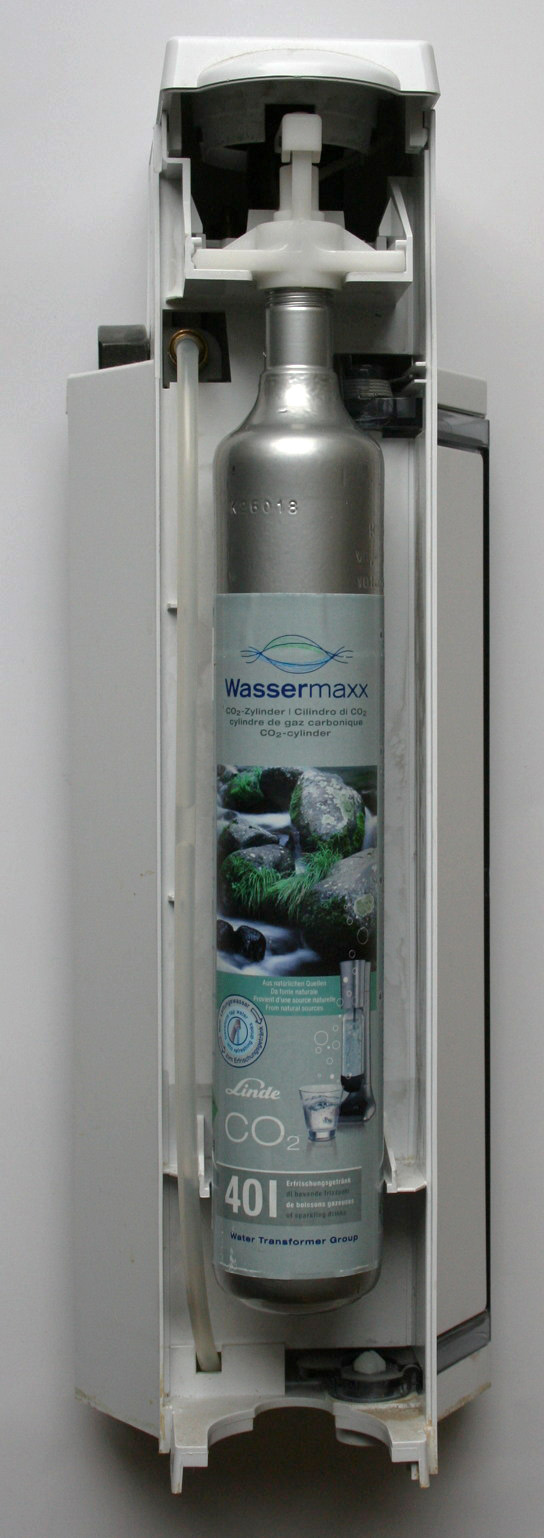
A Sodastream machine from 1999, opened from the rear showing the CO_{2} cartridge

== See also ==
- Soda syphon
- Soda fountain
