= Soda siphon =

Device used to store and dispense carbonated beverages

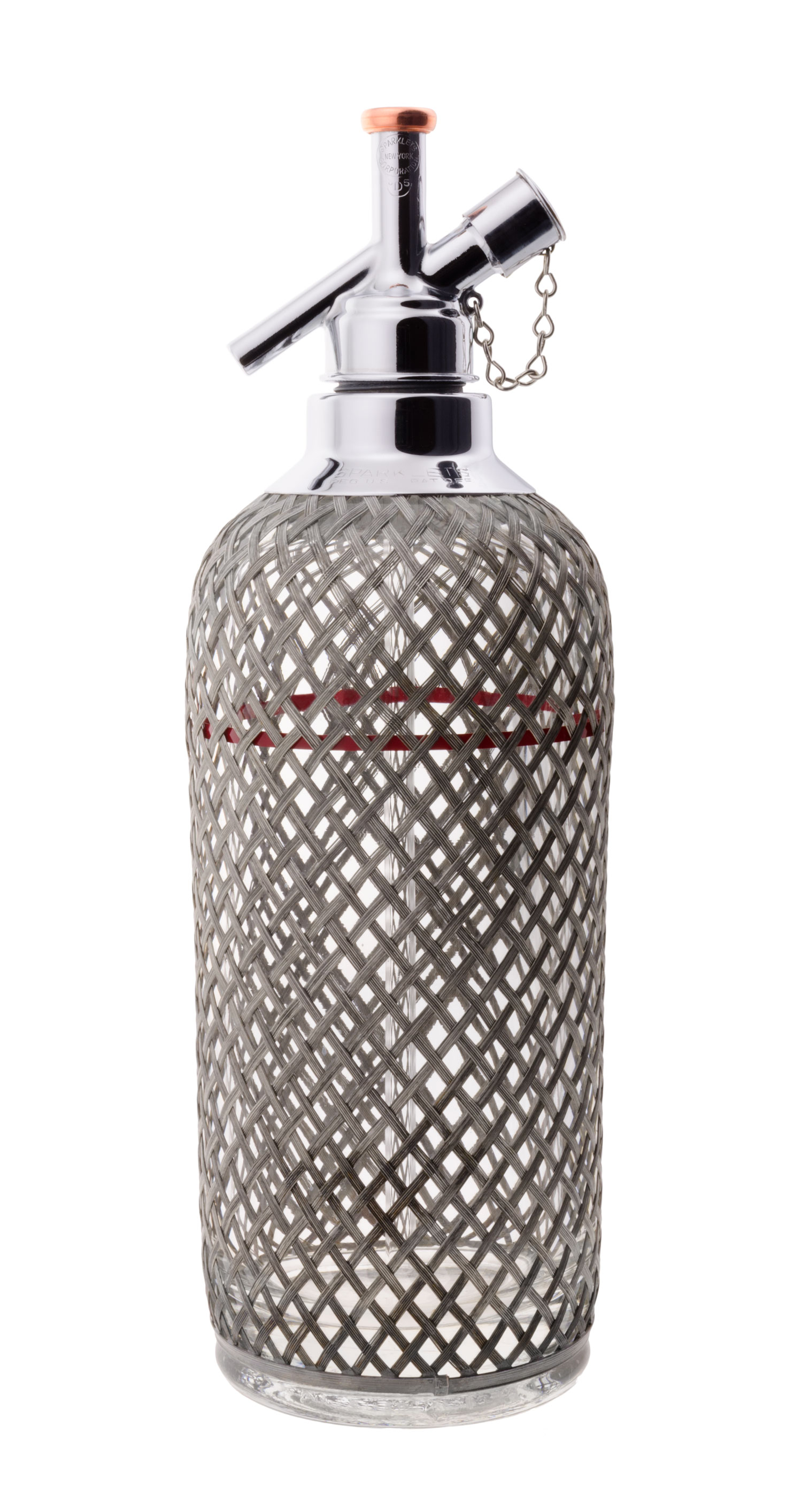
Original Sparklets New York soda siphon from 1930

The soda siphon (sometimes spelled syphon), also known as the seltzer bottle, siphon seltzer bottle, or just siphon) is a device for storing and dispensing carbonated beverages (typically carbonated water) while maintaining the internal pressure, thereby preventing it from going flat. The carbonated beverage is dispensed using the internal pressure of the bottle, so the setup is not a true siphon in its operation.

== History ==
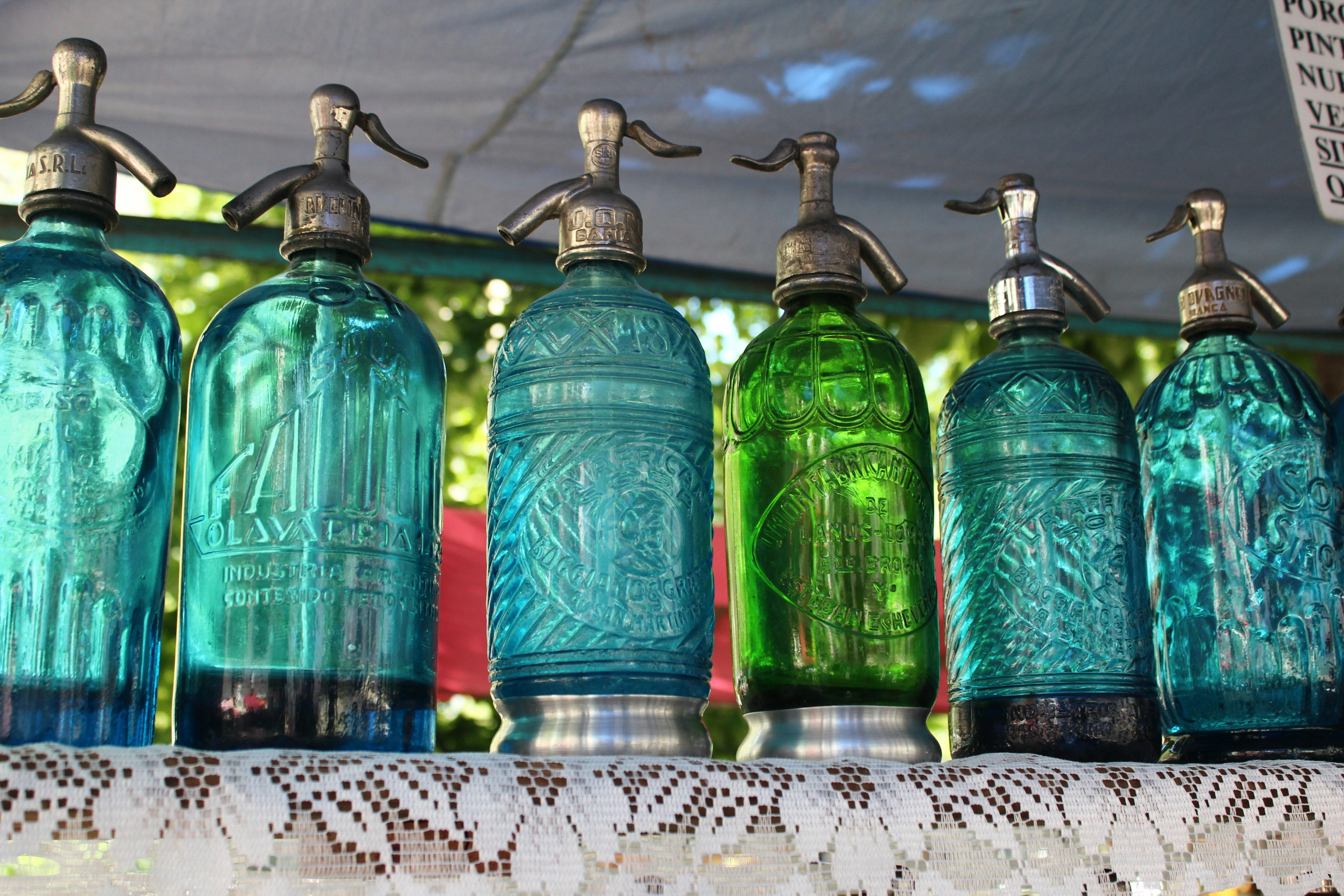
Soda siphons

As early as 1790, the concept of an "aerosol" was introduced in France, with self-pressurized carbonated beverages. The modern siphon was created in 1829, when two Frenchmen patented a hollow corkscrew which could be inserted into a soda bottle and, by use of a valve, allowed a portion of the contents to be dispensed while maintaining the pressure on the inside of the bottle and preventing the remaining soda from going flat.

Soda siphons were popular in the 1920s and 1930s. The rise of bottled carbonated beverages and the destruction of many of the siphon manufacturers' plants in Eastern Europe during World War II led to a decline in their popularity in the years after the war.

== 21st century production ==
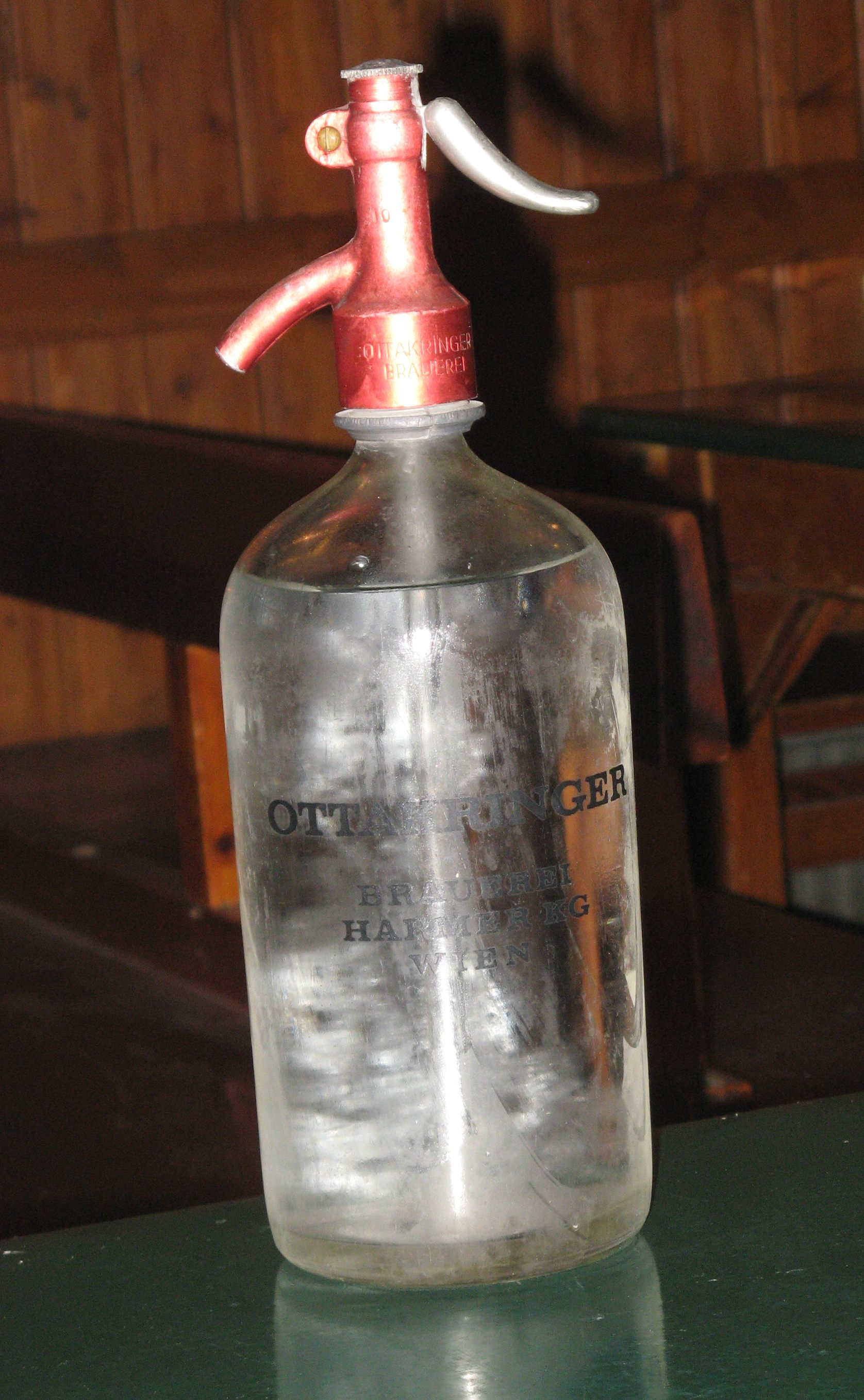
Brauerei Ottakringer soda siphon 2009

Commercial production and delivery of pre-filled bottles of seltzer continued in the whole of Argentina till at least 2020s and Southern California and Eastern Seaboard regions of the US into 2009. In Europe, particularly Southern European countries like Spain and Italy, where they are sold in most supermarkets, the use of soda siphons is still common for making cocktails during house parties.

== See also ==
- Soda machine (home appliance)
- Carbonated water
- Carbonation
- Gasogene
- Whipping siphon, for making whipped cream with compressed gas
