= Carbonated milk =

Type of drink

Carbonated milk or soda milk is a carbonated soft drink. It can be made from powdered milk or fresh milk, and often has added flavor. In addition to modified mouthfeel, carbonated milk also has a longer shelf-life than similarly processed flat milk and a different flavor. It is sold by several companies and is most popular in Asia.

== History ==
Fermented milk has been part of human diet for several thousand years and is consumed worldwide. Kefir and kumis, both effervescent fermented milk beverages, have been produced since ancient times. Kefir originates from the Caucasus and can be produced from any kind of milk. It is consumed in Eastern Europe, Scandinavia, and Central Asia and has been produced since at least 2,000 BC. Kumis is traditionally produced from mare's milk, but may also be produced from camel's or cow's milk. It is popular in Central Asia and Turkey. Its production has been described since at least 500 BC, though it may have been produced since the Bronze Age.

While traditional fermented milks are still consumed, other kind of carbonated milk have appeared in modern times. In the Victorian era, milk was mixed with soda water to produce a medicinal beverage. This beverage was consumed by cyclists as a refreshment and influenced the Punjab tradition of doodh soda, a drink of milk mixed with Sprite or 7 Up.

In the United States, carbonated milk has been promoted as a way to reduce dairy surpluses. Carbonated milk has also been developed to compete with the rise of sodas and the declining popularity of milk. It has remained unpopular and is a specialty product.

== Manufacture ==
Carbonated milk can be produced by fermentation and other methods.

With fermentation, yeast is added to the milk, producing a yogurt-like effervescent beverage. Along with carbon dioxide, the yeast also produces lactic acid, aromatic compounds and a small amount of ethanol. Examples of carbonated milk beverages produced using fermentation include kefir and kumis.

Aside from fermentation, carbonation can be produced by physical or chemical means. The "dry" method involves adding powdered milk to a liquid, which then produces carbon dioxide when the two are mixed. Another method involves physically mixing or injecting the milk with carbon dioxide to produce the carbonated beverage. Finally, milk can be mixed with soda or sparkling water.

== Characteristics ==
=== Flavor ===
Carbonated milk can have flavor added to it, such as strawberry, peach or root beer. It can also be sweetened, using a sweetener such as sucrose, aspartame or high-fructose corn syrup.

Carbonation has been shown to increase the perceived intensity of flavorings and sweetness, as well as bitterness and chalkiness at higher levels.

=== Texture ===
Unfermented carbonated milk is thinner than uncarbonated milk and thus does coat one's tongue or upper lip. It has been described as being more refreshing and similar to club soda.

=== Shelf life ===
Carbonation increases the shelf life of both raw and pasteurized milk. A similar effect has also been demonstrated with UHT milk. The means by which carbon dioxide reduces spoilage is unknown, but suggested mechanisms include displacement of oxygen, acidification and direct effects on microbial metabolism due to cellular penetration. Carbonation has a similar preserving effect on other dairy products, such as butter, yogurt and cheese. Because of dairy's high susceptibility to spoilage, carbonation has been suggested as a simple means of preservation. With liquids such as milk, this can be achieved using injection or by filling the container's headspace with carbon dioxide.

== Popularity and availability ==
Carbonated milk is most popular in Asia.

Vio is a mix of flavored milk and carbonated water made by The Coca-Cola Company. In India, it is sold primarily by large brands, including Nestle, Amul and Britannia. Milkis is a South Korean brand of carbonated milk, which is also sold in Taiwan and other nearby countries.

== See also ==
- Affogato
- Cream soda
- Calpis
- Dirty soda
- Doodh soda
- Egg cream
- Ice cream float
- Italian soda
- Milkis
- Pilk
- Seltzer
