= Doodh soda =

Milk based soda drink

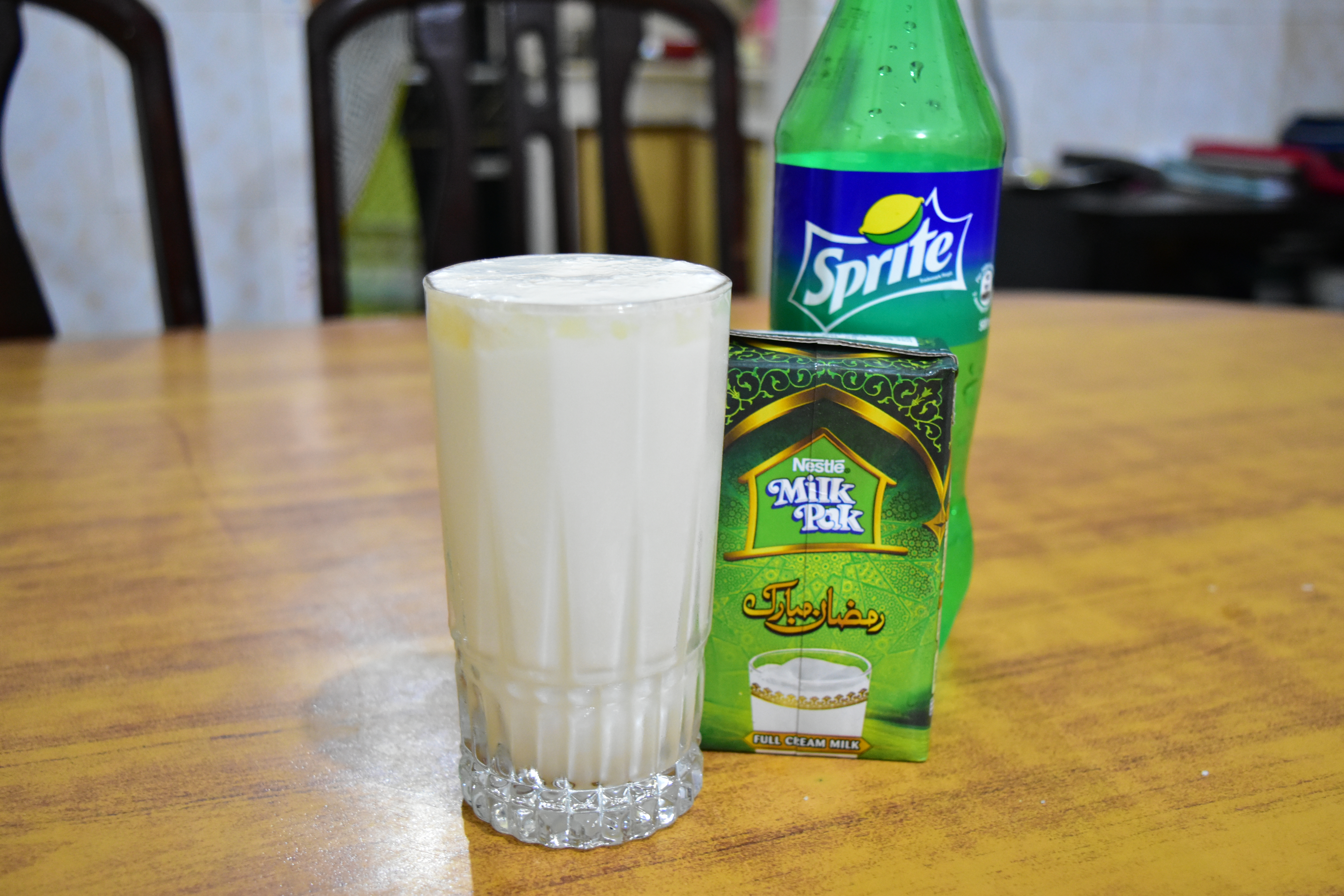
- Doodh soda made with Sprite and milk
- Type: Soft drink, carbonated milk
- Origin: England
- Ingredients: Soda; milk
- Related products: Cream soda; dirty soda; egg cream; ice cream float; soda gembira; Milkis; Pilk

Doodh soda (lit. 'milk soda' in Hindi-Urdu and Punjabi) is a cold drink made by mixing a lemon- or lime-flavored soda, such as Sprite or 7 Up, with milk. A variant uses a cola-flavored soda, such as Pepsi and some use cream soda such as Pakola. It is popular in the Punjab region of both Pakistan and India, and is especially popular during Ramadan. It is considered to be healthier than regular soda, and is often paired with spicy foods. The combination of soda and milk was first created in Victorian England, and from there it spread to India and Pakistan through the British Empire.

Similar drinks using 7 Up and Pepsi have been promoted in the United States. The Pepsi-based version, nicknamed "Pilk" in the brand's marketing campaign, has been compared to Doodh soda.

It is especially popular in the Punjab region of India and Pakistan where it is commonly enjoyed in the summer and the month of Ramadan.

== Preparation ==
There are multiple methods of creating doodh soda. One method is pouring boiling milk into a metal bucket submerged and spun in a container of iced water. Once chilled, the milk is mixed with the soda. Other times, vendors mix the drink by pouring between glasses, aerating the mixture. At home, people create it by filling a glass with equal parts ice, soda, and milk. Other ingredients are sometimes added in small amounts such as Rooh Afza, fruit syrup, sugar, honey, or the zest of a lemon or lime.

== In popular culture ==
The drink gained mainstream popularity due to its mention in the 2025 Indian film Dhurandhar by a character named Mohammed Aalam (played by Gaurav Gera) who rhymed it with a jingle.

== See also ==
- Pilk
- Italian soda
- Fanta cake
