= Dirty soda =

Soft drink mixture

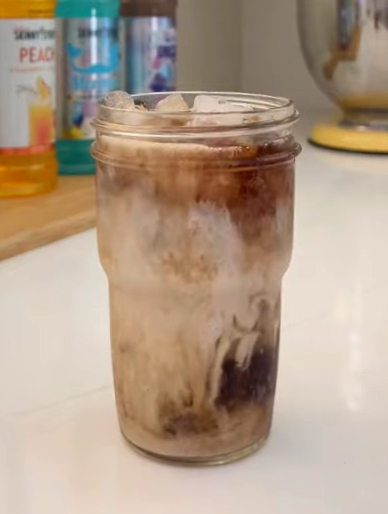
Diet Coke with creamer, peach syrup and ice

Dirty soda, also known as Mormon soda, is a drink consisting of soda mixed with cream, flavored syrups or fruit juices. Dirty sodas have been described as "alcohol-free mocktails with optional flavor, cream and fruit add-ins".

== History ==
The history of dirty soda is connected to the Mormons, the followers of the Church of Jesus Christ of Latter-Day Saints (LDS Church) primarily based in Salt Lake City, Utah. Devotees follow various scriptures including the Doctrine and Covenants. One section from the Doctrine and Covenants, known as the Word of Wisdom, outlines practices to maintain a healthy body. The text prohibits followers from ingesting certain foods and beverages like alcohol, excessive meat, recreational drugs, and hot drinks, which encompass coffee and tea.

Although the Word of Wisdom does not explicitly mention caffeine, many Mormons have taken to avoiding all caffeinated beverages as it is a shared feature of both tea and coffee. However, this topic has been highly controversial among the Mormon community for some time, particularly surrounding the consumptions of cola, which frequently contains caffeine. In 2012, the LDS Church released an official statement clarifying that the Word of Wisdom does not specifically prohibit caffeine consumption.

=== Origins ===
Avoiding common drinks like coffee, tea, and alcohol led the Mormon community to embrace sugar, often in the form of soda. While sugary beverages similar to the dirty soda have long been popular among the Mormon community as an alternative to prohibited drinks, it was not until 2010 that the first official dirty soda shop appeared. The shop was founded in St. George, Utah, by Nicole Tanner, who named it Swig. Tanner trademarked the term "dirty soda" in 2013 when other companies began copying them.

In 2015, a court battle took place between Swig and their main competitor, Sodalicious, when Swig sued them for reproducing and selling their treats along with using their trademarked "dirty soda" idea. In response, Sodalicious emphasized how throughout history, the term "dirty" has been attributed to many alcoholic beverages. The suit ended in 2017 with both parties paying their own legal costs; no further details have been made publicly available.

Although "dirty soda" is a recent invention with Swig's trademark, customizing sugary drinks is not. The concept of a dirty soda originates from the early 20th century when soda jerks, who were people operating soda fountains, would combine carbonated water and flavored syrup to create a variety of customized drinks.

== Geographic distribution and retail presence ==
Dirty sodas are often still sold at drive-through restaurants. One shop that has commercialized dirty soda is Swig, founded by Nicole Tanner in St. George, Utah in 2010.

As dirty soda grew in popularity, a number of specialty soda shops—including Sodalicious, Fiiz, Thirst Drinks, and Quench It!—opened across Utah and neighboring states throughout the mid-2010s. In the 2020s, the drink began to expand to a national consumer base. Swig opened over 95 locations in at least 15 states, including Idaho, Arizona, Texas, Florida, North Dakota, Tennessee, Arkansas, and Missouri. The concept has entered the mainstream at national chains. Sonic Drive-In added "dirty soda"–style customization to its menu, allowing customers across the U.S. to add sweet cream and syrup flavors to their sodas. Convenience stores and gas stations such as Buc-ee's and Speedway have also adopted the trend by offering syrups intended for coffee that customers use to craft their own soda.

== Preparation and variations ==
Dirty sodas consist of a soda mixed with some sort of cream, like half and half or coconut cream. Popular choices for a base soda include Diet Coke and Dr. Pepper, but these can vary by personal preference. Flavored syrup, like vanilla or strawberry, is also added. The soda may also be topped with a wedge of lime or a cherry.

Brands like Topgolf and Jack in the Box have introduced their own versions of the drink. Sonic also offers an option to make any soda on the menu "dirty" by adding coconut cream and lime to their drinks.

== Popularity ==
While dirty sodas first gained traction within Utah and among Latter-day Saint communities throughout the 2010s, in the 2020s they have expanded to other communities due to virality on social media. In December 2021, singer Olivia Rodrigo posted a photo posing with a large dirty soda from Swig. By April 2022, there were over 700,000 videos under the hashtag #dirtysoda on TikTok, reflecting the growing interest in the drink globally.

In September 2024, Hulu released a reality TV show called The Secret Lives of Mormon Wives, following a group of young Mormon women. In the series, they depict their lives as Mormons in Utah, and reference dirty soda many times. In one episode, cast member Demi Engemann said, "We don't drink alcohol or do drugs, so soda is kind of our vice." Another cast member, Taylor Paul, said, "In every other state [the way] Starbucks [is] just so busy, that's how our soda shops are. That's like their [locals'] treat."

The popularity of dirty soda has grown beyond Utah and Mormons. In 2024, Coffee-Mate partnered with Dr. Pepper to sell a Dirty Soda Coconut Lime flavored creamer.

By 2025, the trend extended to Canada, with stores and trailer businesses selling dirty sodas in Alberta, British Columbia, and Ontario.

== See also ==
- Affogato – Italian coffee-based dessert
- Carbonated milk – Type of drink
- Cream soda – Soft drink with cream or vanilla
- Doodh soda – Milk based soda drink
- Egg cream – Cold beverage
- Hard seltzer – Carbonated alcoholic beverage
- Hard soda – Alcoholic beverage
- Ice cream float – Soft drink with ice cream
- Italian soda – Soft drink
- Milk bar – Suburban local general store or café
- Milkis – South Korean soft drink
- Pilk – Drink made from Pepsi and milk
- Seltzer – Water containing dissolved carbon dioxide gas
- Soda bar – Type of restaurant
- Soda gembira – Indonesian drink
- Bandung (drink) – Southeast Asian milk drink
