= Italian soda =

Soft drink

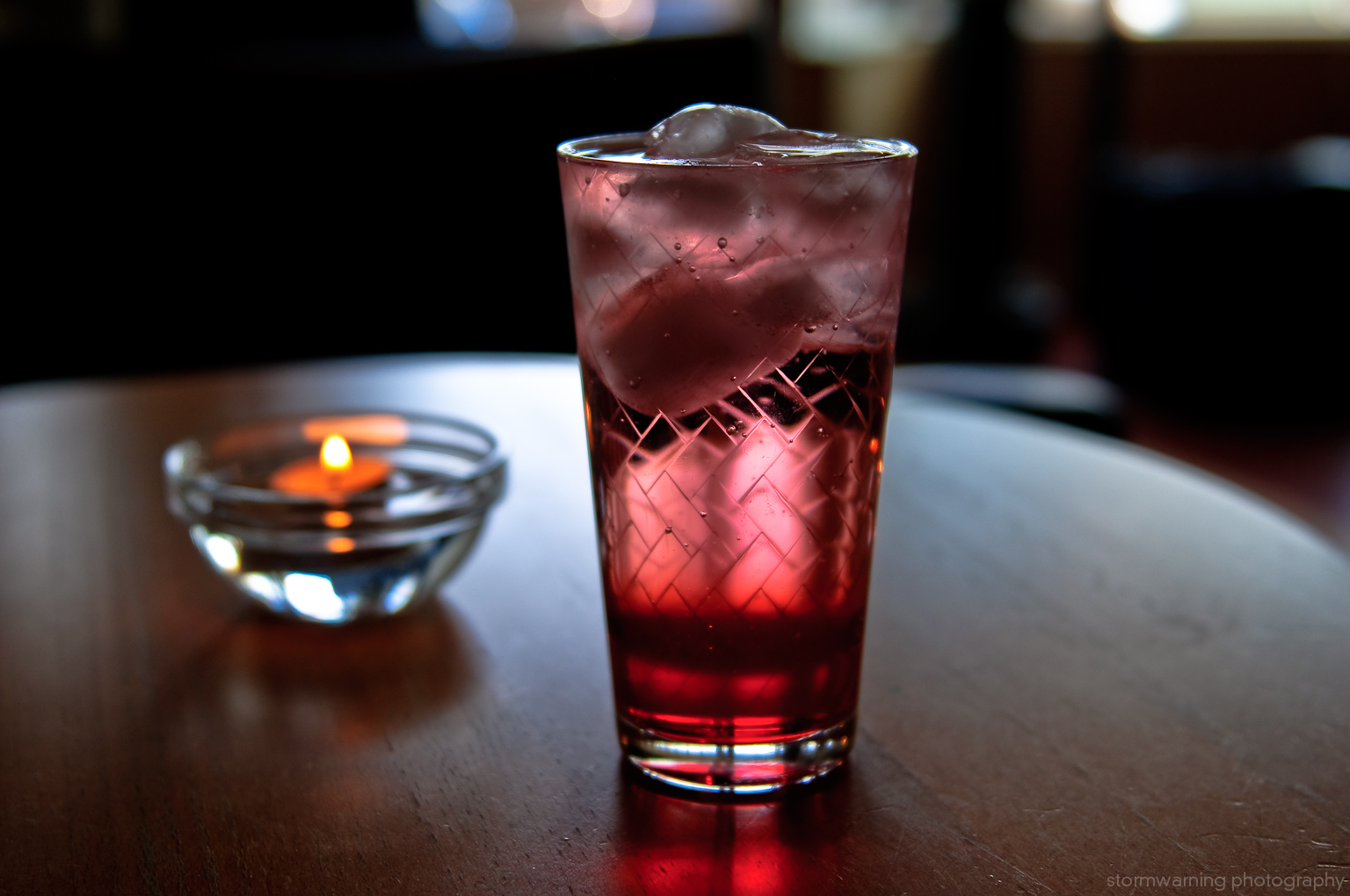
Strawberry Italian soda

An Italian soda is a soft drink made from carbonated water and flavored syrup. Flavors can be fruit (e.g. cherry, blueberry) or modeled after the flavors of desserts, spices, or other beverages (e.g. amaretto, chai, chocolate). Some vendors add cream to the drink as well, which is often then known as a French soda or an Italian cream soda.

Despite its name, Italian soda originated in the United States. One claimant to the introduction and increased popularity of Italian sodas is Torani: Rinaldo and Ezilda Torre brought recipes for flavored syrups from Lucca, Italy, and in 1925 introduced what became known as an Italian soda to the North Beach neighborhood of San Francisco, California. The Italian-American association with Italian sodas has been reinforced by various ready-made brands of Italian sodas, such as the 2005 creation of Romano's Italian Soda Company (named after the Italian-American grandfather of the company's founder) and the 2007 introduction of "The Sopranos Old Fashioned Italian Sodas" which come in three flavors: limoncello, amaretto, and Chianti.

== See also ==
- Affogato
- Carbonated milk
- Cream soda
- Diabolo
- Dirty soda
- Doodh soda
- Egg cream
- Ice cream float
- Milkis
- Pilk
