= 7 Up cake =

American dessert

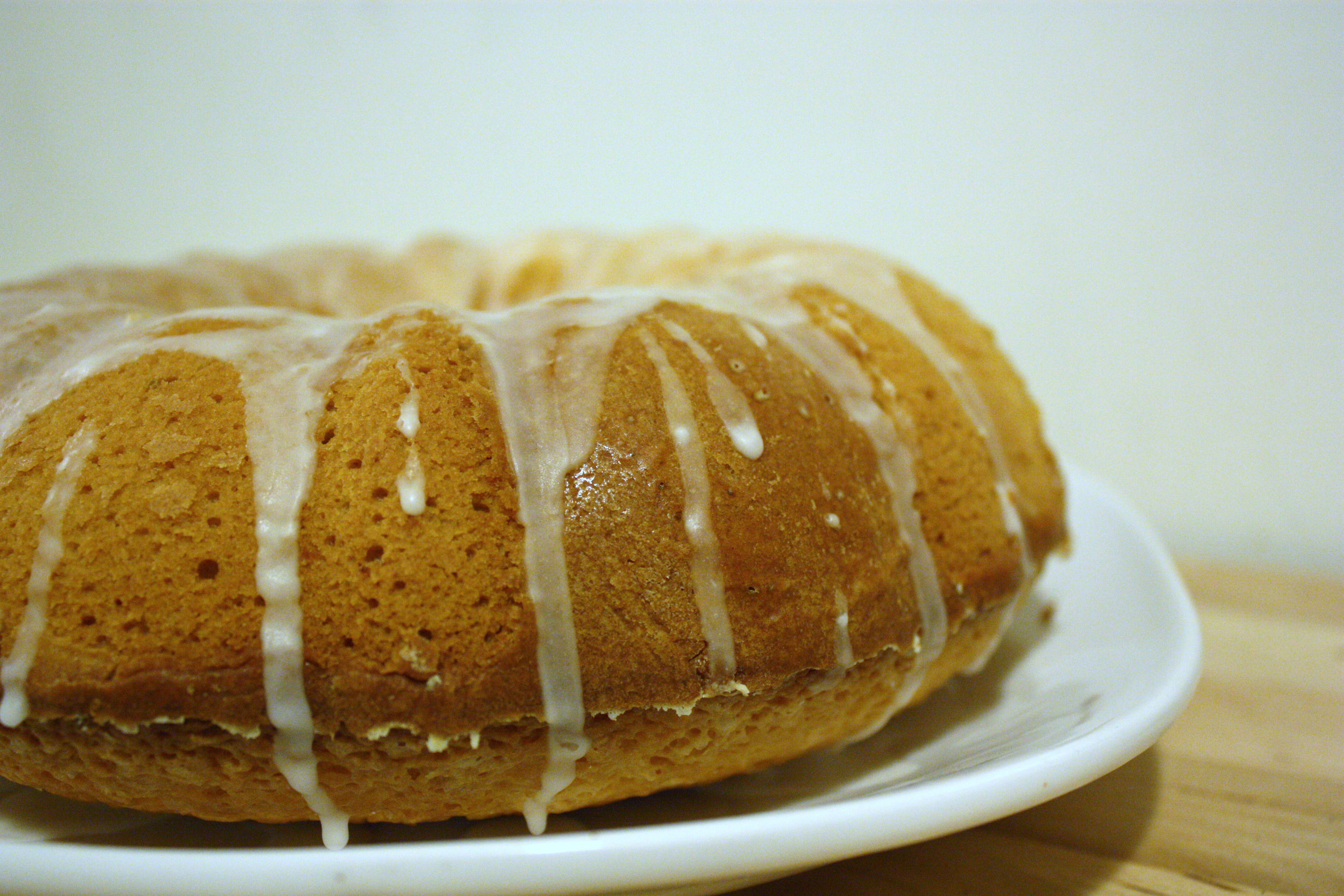
- A 7 Up cake
- Type: Cake
- Course: Dessert
- Place of origin: United States
- Main ingredients: 7 Up, sugar
- Similar dishes: Fanta cake

7 Up cake is a bundt pound cake which contains 7 Up as an ingredient in the icing or the batter. In 1953, a promotional recipe book was published by the 7 Up corporation containing a recipe for "Seven-Up Cake with Seven-Up Icing". It recommended using a packaged cake mix and using 7 Up as a replacement for the original liquid required. Some recipes rely solely on 7 Up for leavening the cake instead of the more traditional ingredients of baking soda or baking powder.

== See also ==
- Cola chicken
- Fanta cake
- Pilk
- Water pie
