= Ice cream float =

Soft drink with ice cream

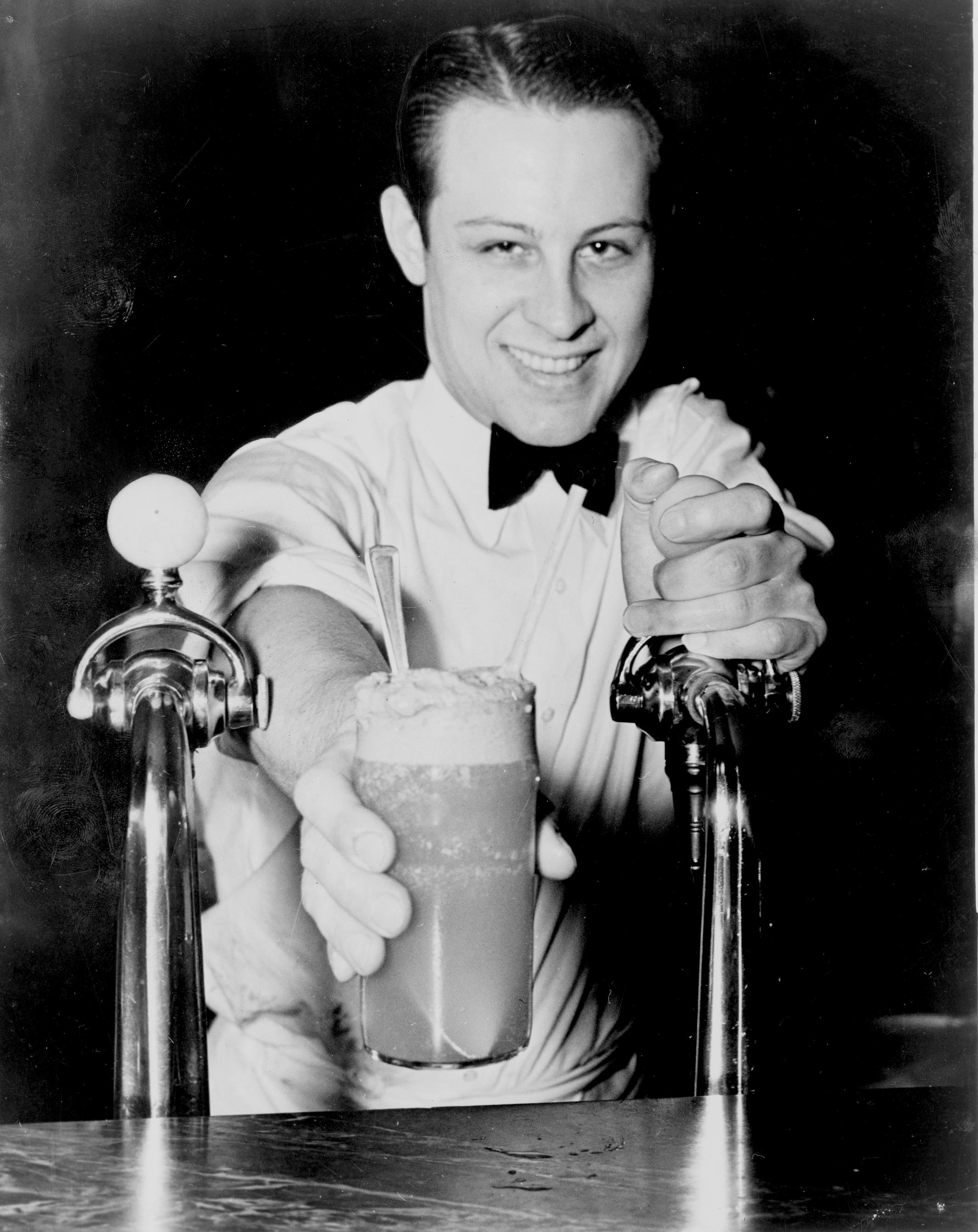
- A soda jerk passing ice cream soda between two soda fountains in 1936
- Alternative names: Ice cream soda, Coke float, root beer float, spider
- Type: Dessert
- Place of origin: United States
- Region or state: Philadelphia, Pennsylvania
- Created by: Robert McCay Green
- Main ingredients: Ice cream, syrup and soft drink or carbonated water

An ice cream float, soda float or ice cream soda, also known as a spider in Australia and New Zealand, is a chilled beverage made by adding ice cream to a soft drink or to a mixture of flavored syrup and carbonated water.

When root beer and vanilla ice cream or sweet cream ice cream are used, the beverage is referred to as a root beer float (United States). A close variation is the coke float, which is made using cola.

== History ==
The ice cream float was invented by Robert M. Green in Philadelphia, Pennsylvania, in 1874 during the Franklin Institute's semicentennial celebration. The traditional story is that, on a particularly hot day, Green ran out of ice for the flavored drinks he was selling and instead used vanilla ice cream from a neighboring vendor, inventing a new drink.

His own account, published in Soda Fountain magazine in 1910, states that while operating a soda fountain at the celebration, he wanted to create a new treat to attract customers away from another vendor who had a larger, fancier soda fountain. After some experimentation, he decided to combine ice cream and flavored soda. During the celebration, he sold vanilla ice cream with soda and a choice of 16 flavored syrups. The new treat was a sensation and soon other soda fountains began selling ice cream floats. Green's will instructed that "Originator of the Ice Cream Soda" was to be engraved on his tombstone.

There are at least three other claimants for the invention of the root beer float: Fred Sanders, Philip Mohr, and George Guy, one of Robert Green's own employees. Guy claimed to have absentmindedly mixed ice cream and soda in 1872, much to his customers' delight.

== Regional names ==
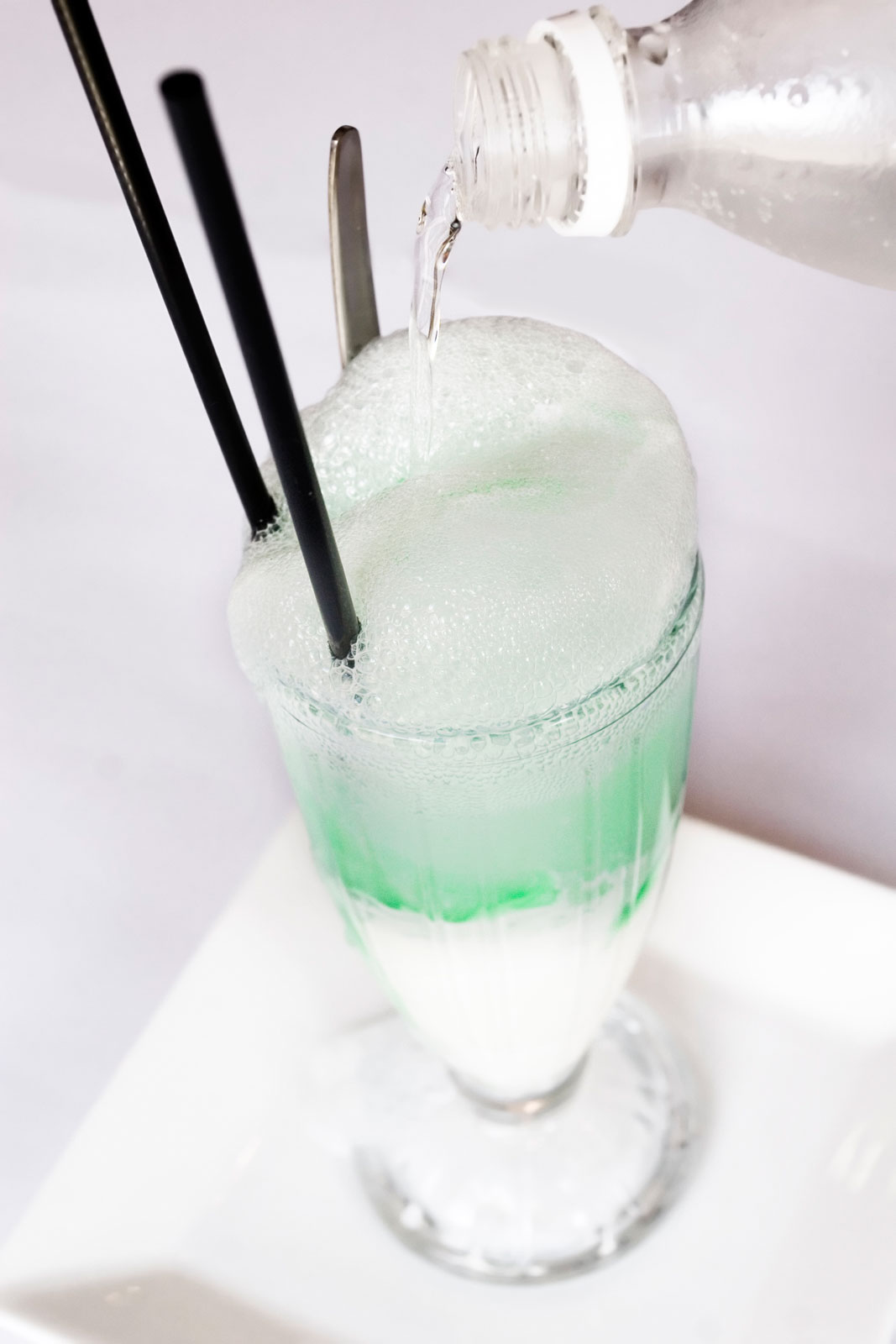
A lime spider

In Australia and New Zealand, an ice cream float is known as a "spider" because once the carbonation hits the ice cream it forms a spider web-like reaction. It is traditionally made using either lime or pink cream soda.

In the UK and Ireland, it is usually referred to as an "ice-cream float", "smokey" or simply a "float", as "soda" is usually taken to mean soda water. Sweetened carbonated drinks are instead collectively called "soft drinks", "(fizzy) pop", or "fizzy juice".

In Mexico, it is known as "helado flotante" ("floating ice cream") or "flotante". In El Salvador, Honduras, Guatemala, Costa Rica, and Colombia, it is called "vaca negra" (black cow); in Brazil, "vaca preta"; and in Puerto Rico, a "black out".

In the United States, an "ice cream soda" typically refers to the drink containing ice cream, soda water and flavored syrup, whereas a "float" is generally ice cream combined with a carbonated soft drink (usually root beer).

== Variations ==
Variations of ice cream floats are as countless as the varieties of drinks and the flavors of ice cream, but some have become more prominent than others.

=== Butterbeer ===
In 2014, The Wizarding World of Harry Potter themed area at the Universal Orlando Resort debuted the drink composed of the ingredients brown sugar and butter syrup mixed with cream soda and whipped cream, based on the originally fictional drink served at Hogsmeade. In 2016, Starbucks debuted the Smoked Butterbeer Frappuccino Latte.

=== Beer float ===
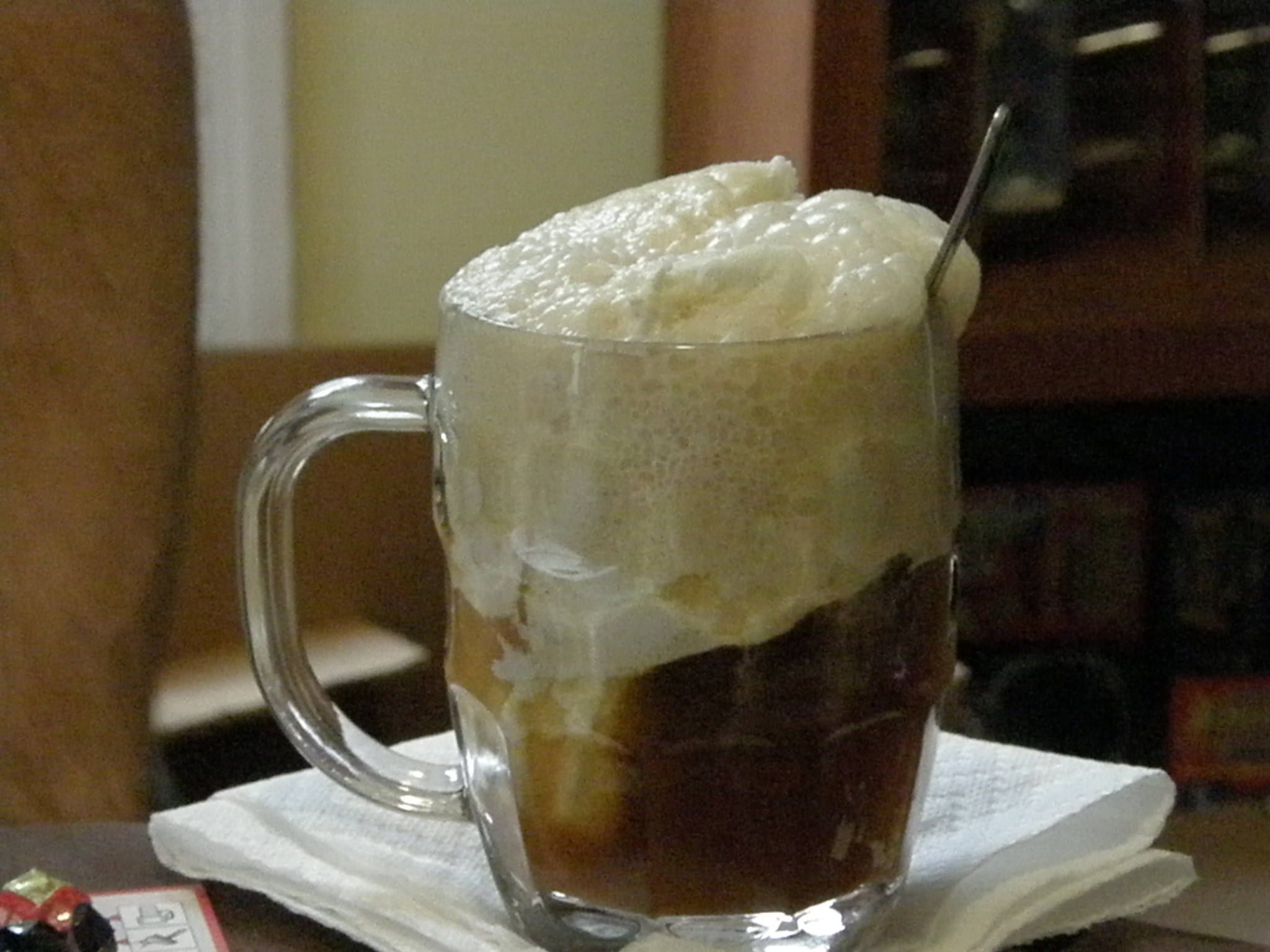
A beer float

A beer float is made of Guinness stout, chocolate ice cream, and espresso. Although the Shakin' Jesse version is blended into more of a milkshake consistency, most restaurant bars can make the beer float version.

=== Boston cooler ===
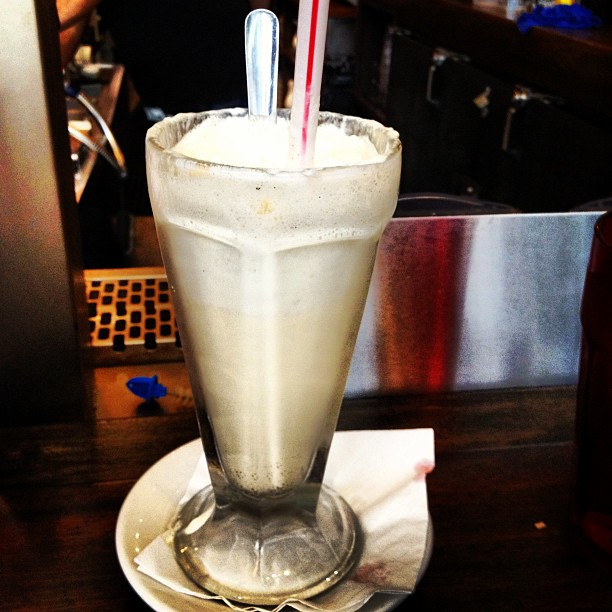
A Boston cooler with Vernors ginger ale

Today, a Boston cooler is typically composed of Vernors ginger ale and vanilla ice cream.

The first reference to a Boston cooler appears in the St. Louis Post Dispatch where a New York bartender claimed to have coined the phrase for a summer cocktail of sarsaparilla and ginger ale. In the 1910s, the term was applied in soda fountains and ice cream parlors to a scoop of ice cream served in a melon half. The name was also applied to a number of different ice-cream float combinations, including root beer, though ginger ale became the most common soft drink component.

By the 1880s a version of the Boston cooler was being served in Detroit by Sanders Confectionery, made with Sanders' ice cream and Vernors. Originally, a drink called a Vernors Cream was served as a shot or two of sweet cream poured into a glass of Vernors. Later, vanilla ice cream was substituted for the cream and blended like a milkshake. The local myth that it was named after Detroit's Boston Boulevard is belied by the fact that Boston Boulevard did not exist at the time.

It remains a popular summer drink in the Detroit area.

=== Cream soda ===
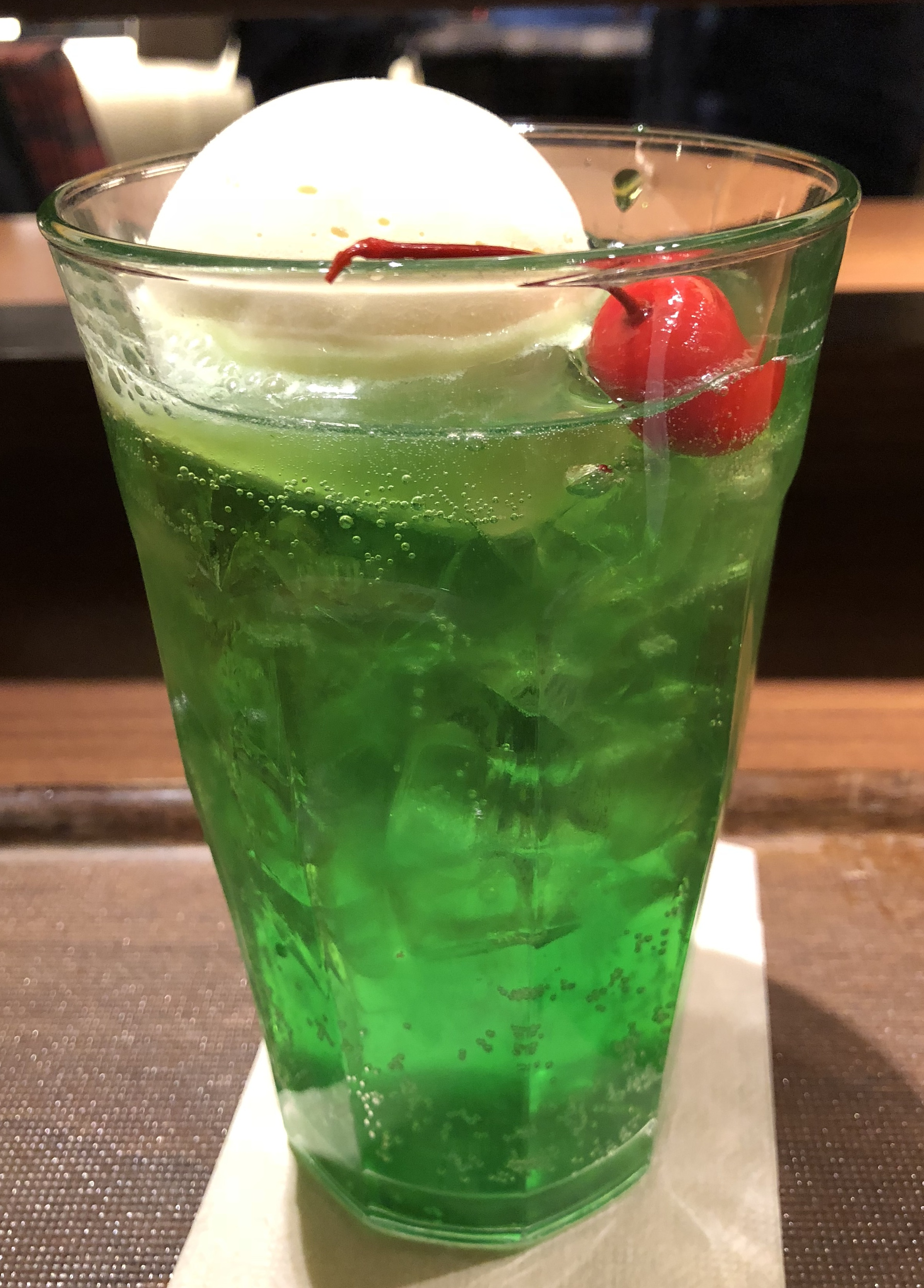
A Japanese style cream soda in Ueshima coffee shop

In Japan, an ice cream float known as a cream soda is made with vanilla ice cream and melon soda, often topped with a single maraschino cherry.

=== Helado flotante ===
In Mexico, popular versions are made from Coca-Cola with coconut and Kahlúa ice cream, from chocolate Coca-Cola with vanilla ice cream, and from red wine with lemon ice cream.

=== Nectar soda ===
This variant is popular in New Orleans and parts of Ohio, made with a syrup consisting of equal parts almond and vanilla syrups mixed with sweetened condensed milk and a touch of red food coloring to produce a pink, opalescent syrup base for the soda.

=== Purple cow ===
In the context of ice cream soda, a purple cow is vanilla ice cream in purple grape soda. The Purple Cow, a restaurant chain in the southern United States, features this and similar beverages. In a more general context, a purple cow may refer to a non-carbonated grape juice and vanilla ice cream combination. Grapico, a brand of grape soda bottled in Birmingham, Alabama, is ubiquitously linked to ice cream floats in that state.

The soda is named after Gelett Burgess's 1895 nonsense poem Purple Cow.

=== Root beer float ===
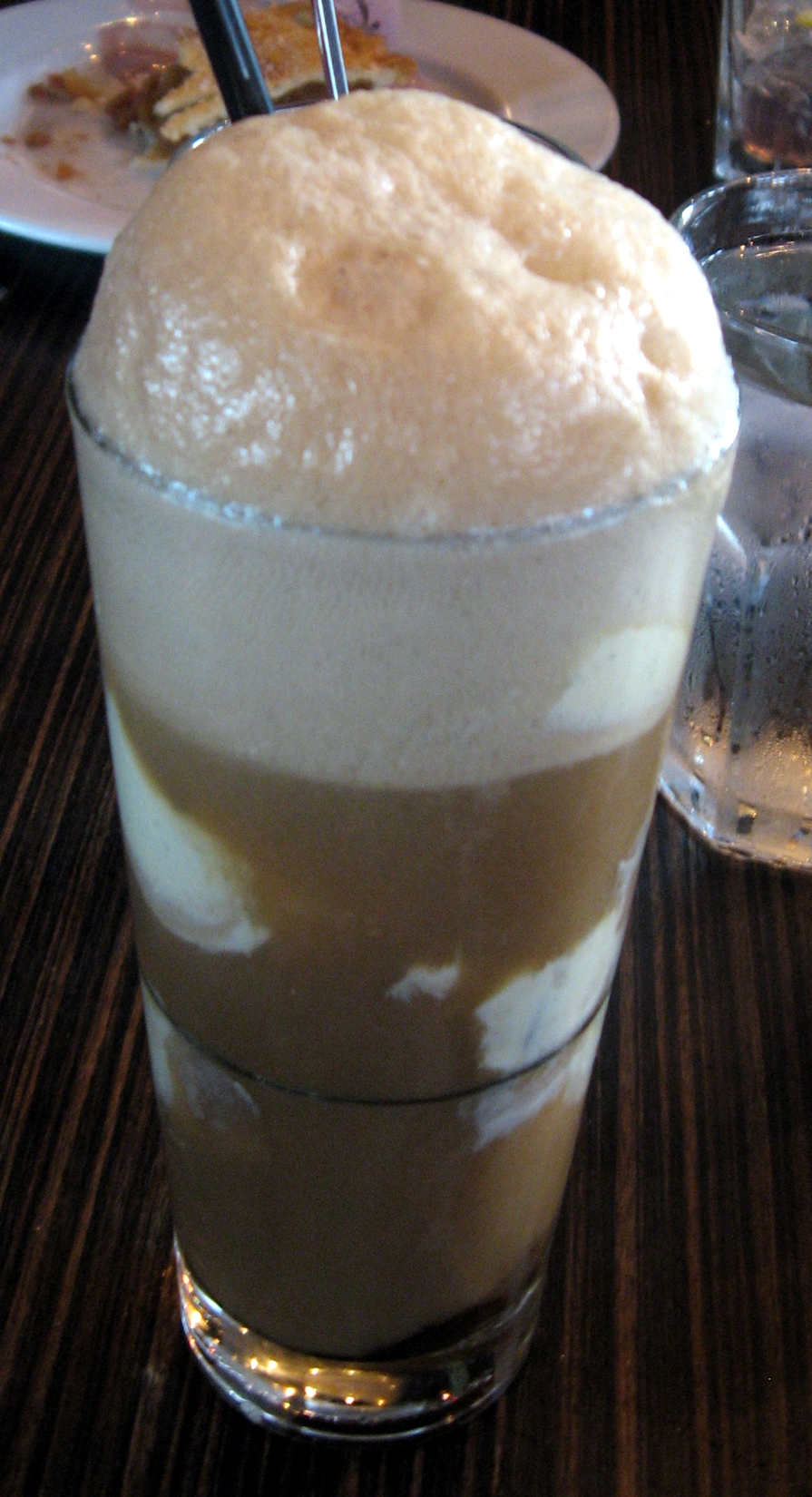
A root beer float

Also known as a "black cow" or "brown cow", the root beer float is traditionally made with vanilla ice cream and root beer, but it can also be made with other ice cream flavors. Frank J. Wisner, owner of Colorado's Cripple Creek Brewing, is credited with creating the first root beer float on August 19, 1893. The similarly flavored soft drink birch beer may also be used instead of root beer.

In the United States, the chain A&W Restaurants is well known for its root beer floats. The definition of a black cow varies by region. For instance, in some localities, a "root beer float" has strictly vanilla ice cream; a float made with root beer and chocolate ice cream is a "chocolate cow" or a "brown cow". In some places a "black cow" or a "brown cow" was made with cola instead of root beer.

In 2008, the Dr Pepper Snapple Group introduced its Floats bottled beverage line. This includes A&W Root Beer, A&W Cream Soda and Sunkist flavors which attempt to simulate the taste of their respective ice cream float flavors in a creamy, bottled drink.

=== Vaca-preta ===
In Brazil and Portugal it is known as vaca-preta ("black cow") and commonly made by combining vanilla or chocolate ice cream and Coca-Cola.

== See also ==
- Affogato
- Carbonated milk
- Cream soda
- Dirty soda
- Doodh soda
- Egg cream
- Italian soda
- Milkis
- Pilk
- Carbonated water
- List of brand name soft drink products
- List of soft drink flavors

== Sources ==
- Funderburg, Anne Cooper. "Sundae Best: A History of Soda Fountains" (2002) University of Wisconsin Popular Press. ISBN 0-87972-853-1.
- Gay, Cheri Y. (2001). Detroit Then and Now, p. 5. Thunder Bay Press. ISBN 1-57145-689-9.
- Bulanda, George; Bak, Richard; and Ciavola, Michelle. The Way It Was: Glimpses of Detroit's History from the Pages of Hour Detroit Magazine, p. 8. Momentum Books. ISBN 1-879094-71-1.
- Houston, Kay. "Of soda fountains and ice cream parlors." (February 11, 1996) The Detroit News.
- Alissa Ozols (2008) San Francisco.
