= Pilk =

Drink made from Pepsi and milk

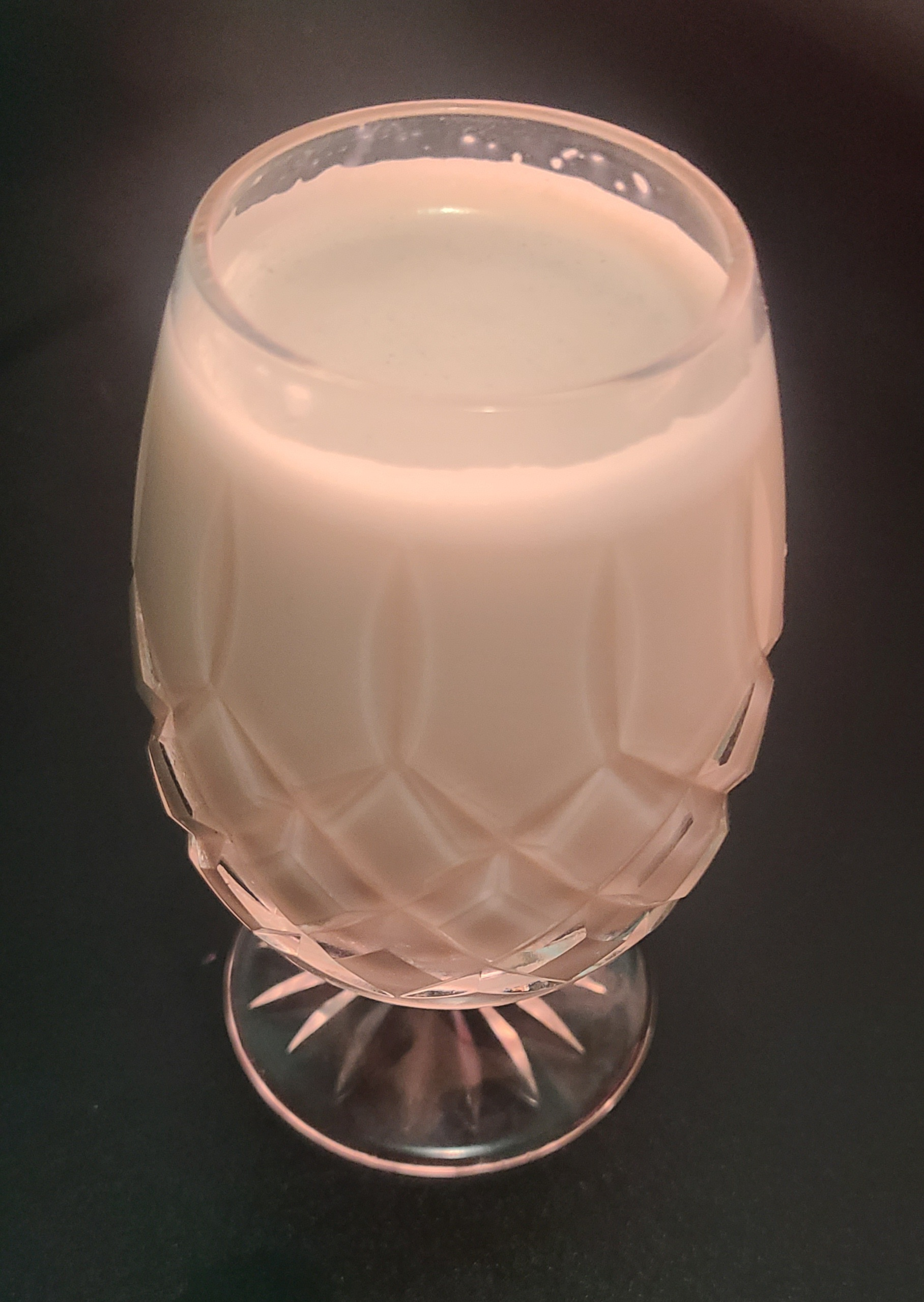
A glass of Pilk

Pilk is a drink made by combining Pepsi and milk. While the concept of mixing Pepsi with milk dates back farther, including being a running gag on the sitcom Laverne and Shirley, the name "pilk" first gained traction as an internet meme in 2020 after a tweet using the term went viral. It was later the subject of a viral Pepsi advert in 2022.

A similar drink, milk coke was discussed on social media in 2019.

== Social media ==
In 2019, a comedy writer posted on Twitter that milk coke, a mixed drink made of cola and milk, was a popular beverage in Birmingham, England. Many commenters replied to the post with disgust and confusion, although others commented that the drink had existed for years earlier and compared it to an ice cream float. The Guardian reported that after asking three Birmingham residents if they had drunk milk coke, all three had said no.

In 2020, Twitter user @scubadivingzoo posted a photo of a milk and Pepsi drink captioned "Y'all want a glass of pilk", which went viral, later becoming popular on TikTok.

== Pepsi advertisement ==
Avatar of Pepsi

Pepsi
(@Pepsi)
tweeted:

Milk and cookies are so last year. Rumor has it Santa prefers Pilk...a dirty soda twist that you didn’t see coming @lindsaylohan 🙌 Join the naughty list when you follow @Pepsi & share a 📸 or 🎥 of your 🥤+🥛+🍪 with #PilkandCookies #Sweepstakes and you could win holiday cash

Dec 1, 2022

Inspired by the dirty soda trend, Pepsi launched a pilk advertising campaign on December 1, 2022. It featured American actress Lindsay Lohan encouraging people to try Pilk and share their creations using the hashtag #PilkandCookies for the chance to win money. The ads went viral and inspired internet memes.

The advert appears to show one glass of pilk being made with a 1:1 ratio of milk and Pepsi, and another being a glass of Pepsi with a "heavy pour" of milk added, as if adding milk to coffee. Pepsi also promoted variant recipes such as the "Naughty & Ice" made with 1 cup of whole milk, 1 tablespoon of heavy cream, 1 tablespoon of vanilla creamer and 1 cup of Pepsi.

In 2023, Pilk and Cookies was honored with a Webby Award for Best Social Campaign. It was also shortlisted by The One Show in the Culture Driver category and awarded by the Association of National Advertisers with three Excellence honors, winning in the categories of Social Media and Significant Results (for reaching 10 billion impressions) as well as a silver place for Holiday Marketing.

== In popular culture ==
Pilk was a favorite drink of Laverne on the '70s sitcom Laverne & Shirley (and by extension actress Penny Marshall), though other characters on the show were disgusted by it—with one saying "you almost killed me with that in the sixth grade".

== See also ==
- Egg cream
- Affogato
- Carbonated milk
- Cream soda
- Doodh soda
- Italian soda
- Fanta cake
