= Bandung (disambiguation) =

Bandung is the capital of West Java, Indonesia.

Nearby areas also referred to as Bandung include:

- Bandung Regency, the suburban area surrounding the city of Bandung, West Java, Indonesia
- West Bandung Regency, formerly a part of Bandung Regency
- Bandung Metropolitan Area, consisting of the city of Bandung and parts of surrounding regencies

Topics in connection with it include:

- The Bandung Conference of 1955, the Asian–African Conference which took place in Bandung, Indonesia
- Persib Bandung, a soccer club in Bandung, West Java, Indonesia

There are two districts of Indonesia bearing the name "Bandung":

- Bandung, a district in Serang Regency, Banten
- Bandung, a district in Tulungagung Regency, East Java

Bandung may also refer to:

- Amphoe Ban Dung, a district (amphoe) of Udon Thani Province, Thailand
- Bandung (drink), a Singaporean drink consisting of milk flavoured with rosewater or rose-flavoured syrup, popular among the Malay communities of Southeast Asia

== See also ==
- Bandung International Airport (disambiguation)
