= Soda jerk =

Occupation

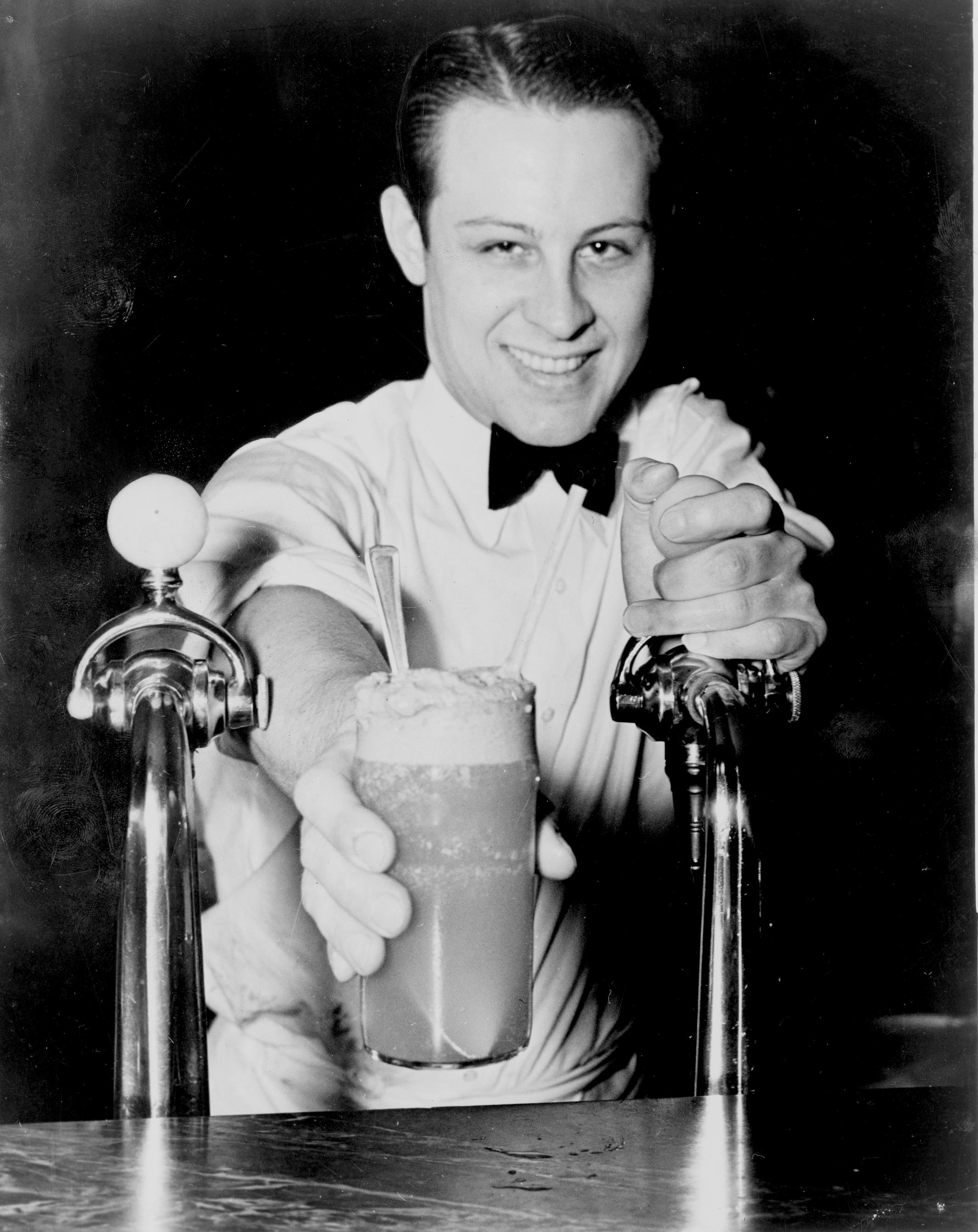
Soda jerk passing an ice cream soda between two soda fountains, New York City, New York, 1936

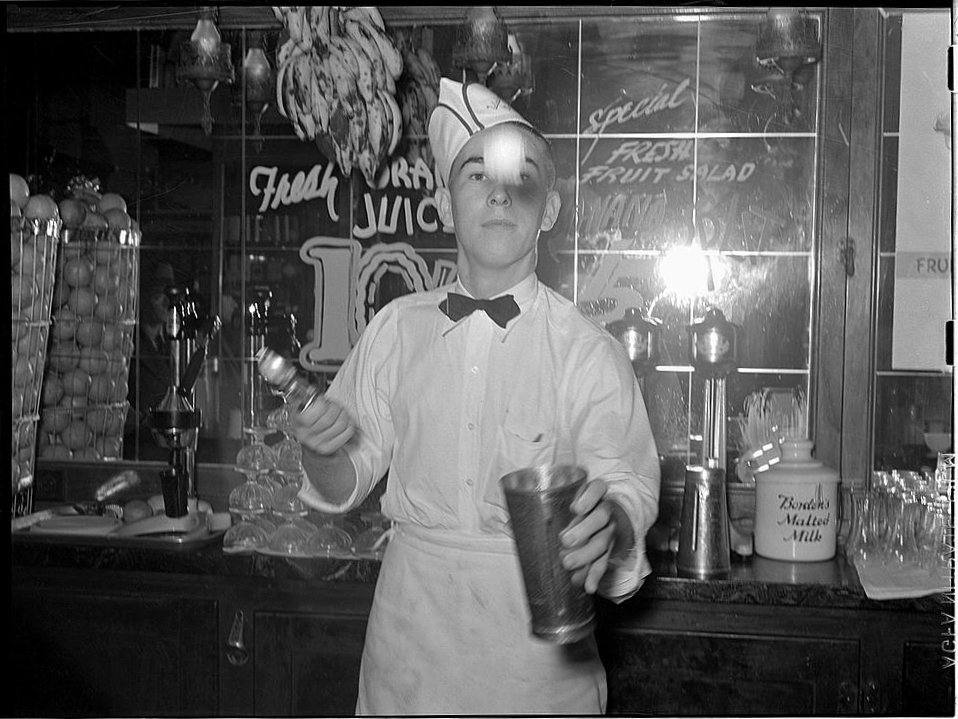
A soda jerk tossing a scoop of ice cream into a metal mixing cup before blending a malted shake, Texas, 1939

In the United States, a soda jerk (or soda jerker) was a person—typically a young man—operating the soda fountain in a restaurant, preparing and serving soda drinks and ice cream sodas. The drinks were made by mixing flavored syrup, carbonated water, and occasionally malt powder over either ice or a few scoops of ice cream. The drink would then be served in a tall glass with a long-handled spoon, most commonly known as a "soda spoon", and drinking straws.

Soda jerks were relatively common in the United States from the 1920s until the late 1950s; due to economic and social trends, the occupation essentially no longer exists.

== Origin of term ==
The term soda jerk was a pun on soda clerk, the formal job title of the drugstore assistants who operated soda fountains. It was inspired by the "jerking" action the server would implement to drive the fountain handle back and forth when adding soda. The soda fountain spigot itself was typically a sturdy, shiny fixture attached at the end of a pipe which protruded over the counter and curved down at the end for filling glasses. Since most drinks required carbonated water, the tap handle was built large to accommodate frequent use of the fountain.

== History ==
The practice of operating a soda fountain in a drugstore reached its peak popularity in the 1940s but was popular from the 1920s through the 1950s. The position was coveted, and was commonly only awarded after protracted menial labor in the store. Soda jerking was dominated by popular young men with loud personalities and good people skills because of the fashionable environment and "cool" association. Boys who worked at the shops were expected to socialize with and entertain the guests in addition to serving their drinks.

Michael Karl Witzel describes an archetypal soda jerk as "[a] consummate showman, innovator and freelance linguist ... the pop culture star of the Gilded Age".

The proliferation of ice cream parlors declined as drive-ins and walk-up fast food stands grew in popularity, and grill and fry cooks replaced soda jerks.

== Jargon ==
Soda jerks were known for having their own jargon for how their drinks were made. They created nicknames for different drinks. For example, they called a glass of milk "baby" and a strawberry milkshake "in the hay". A Coca-Cola with ice was called "scratch one". They also had jargon to express how they wanted their drink to be served. Coffee, or "draw one" would be served strong if called "draw one from the south". If a drink was ordered with extra ice it was "heavy on the hail".

Some of these terms are still used today. Egg creams, the shorthand for a chocolate soda with some milk, are served in many places and are especially known in New York where they originated.

A slang term from soda jerk jargon that remains in use is "concrete" for an extremely thick milkshake.

== See also ==
- Dirty soda
- Barista
- Bartender
- Lunch counter
- Milk bar
- Milkshake
- Coffeehouse
- List of obsolete occupations
