= Cola chicken =

Hong Kong chicken dish

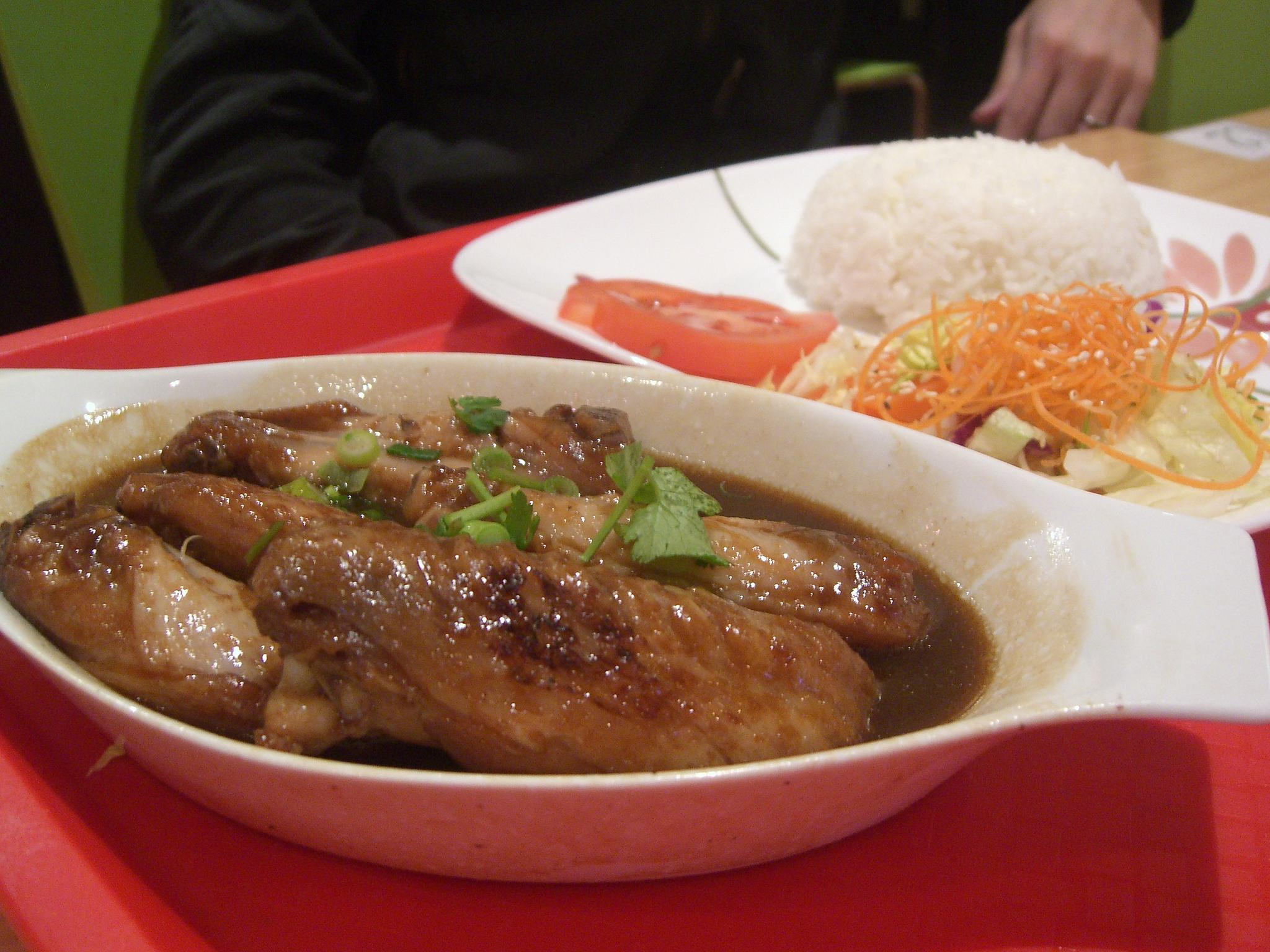
- Chicken wings in Coca-Cola sauce
- Course: Side
- Region or state: Hong Kong
- Main ingredients: Chicken

Cola chicken (Cantonese:可樂雞翼, ho lok gai yik) is a chicken dish popular in Hong Kong, prepared with chicken and cola soft drink as the main ingredients. The cola is typically mixed with another ingredient, such as soy sauce, barbecue sauce or ketchup. It can be prepared with regular but not diet cola. As the dish cooks, the sauce reduces, accentuating the cola flavor and creating a glaze in the process. It is sometimes prepared as a chicken wing dish. It can have a sticky texture, depending on how it is prepared. Cola chicken has been described as a dish that has flavor elements of sweet and sour, and the cola has been described as imparting a rich flavor to the chicken meat.

There have been two accounts regarding the origin of the dish. According to one, a cook in Jinan, Shandong accidentally tipped over a can of Coca-Cola into a pot of braised chicken wings. He discovered the unique taste of cola with chicken and soy sauce, and soon it became popular. In another story, cola chicken was already made in Western countries with tomato sauce. It was introduced to Taiwan, where tomato sauce was replaced with soy sauce.

== See also ==
- List of chicken dishes
- Orange chicken
- Fanta cake
