= Diabolo (drink) =

Mixture of lemonade and syrup served mostly in France

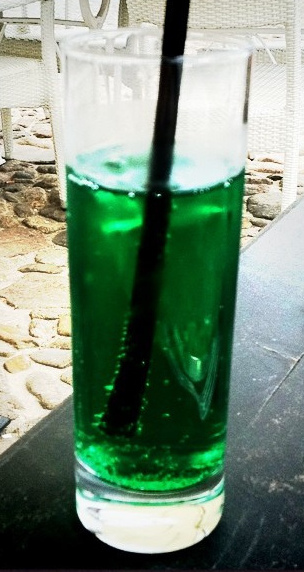
- Type: Non-alcoholic mixed drink
- Origin: France
- Flavour: Grenadine, Strawberry, Mint
- Ingredients: Lemonade and syrup

A diabolo is a non-alcoholic mixed drink available in most restaurants and bars in France. It consists of a common lemon soda mixed with syrup. Popular flavors include mint (Diabolo Menthe), strawberry, lemon, cherry or grenadine.

== Origins ==
The diabolo drink appeared before 1920, and became popular in France in the 1920s. The drink was around that time described as a mixture of a lemon soda and a 'very light tincture of liqueur', a lemonade and a cassis liquor, or a lemon-lime soda and a syrup.

== Translation in other languages ==
Diabolo has no equivalent in Italian, but a lemon soda mixed with different syrups can approximately be translated as a gassosa.

== Variants ==
A diabolo flamand is a cocktail composed of jenever, lemon soda and often a violet syrup, it can often be very sweet.

== Gallery ==
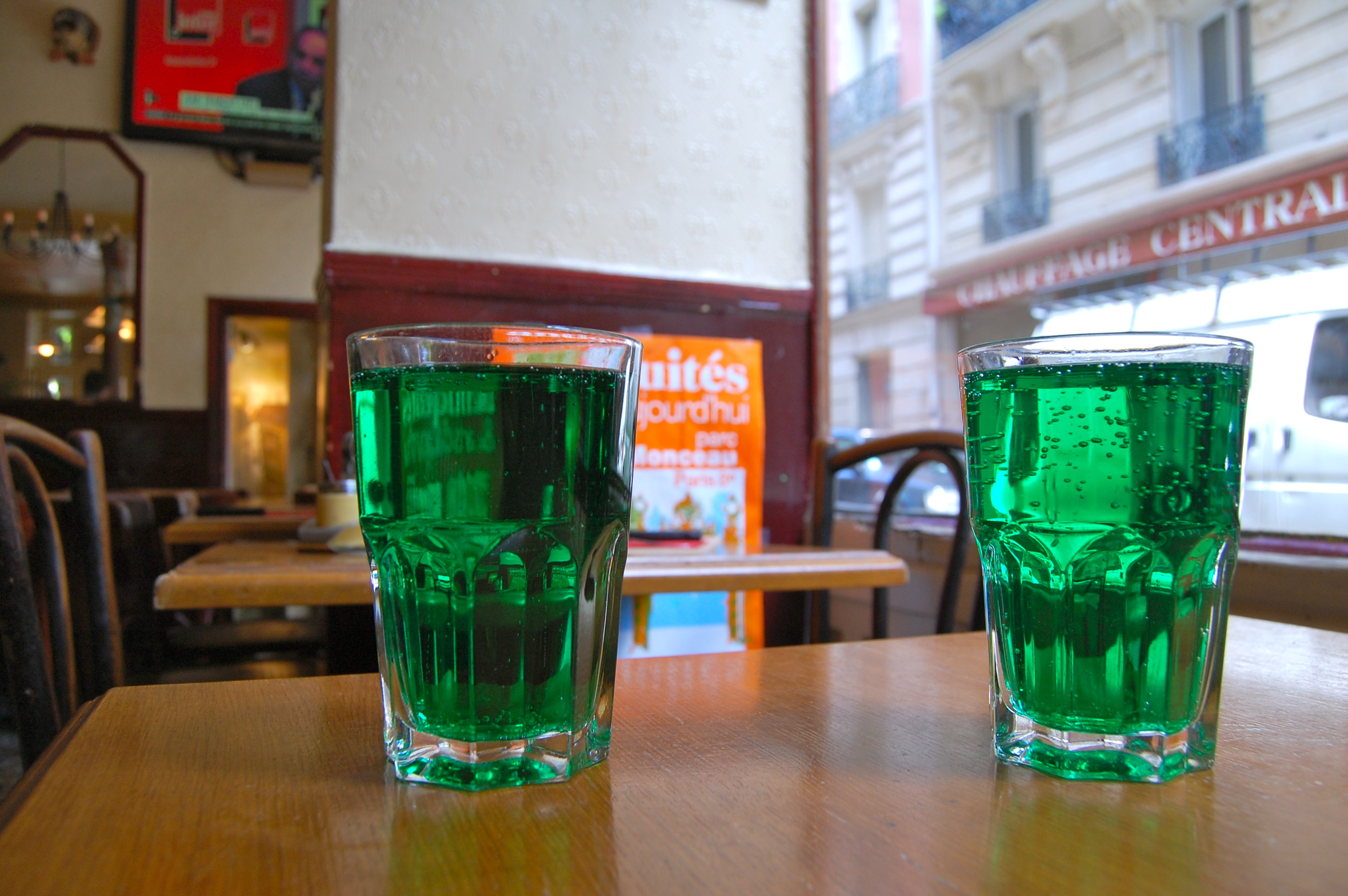
Two mint diabolos on a table of a bar in Montmartre.

== Popular culture ==
- 1977: Diabolo menthe (Peppermint Soda), movie by Diane Kuris

== See also ==
- Lemonade
- Italian soda
