= Mee bandung =

Malaysian noodle soup

Mee Bandung Muar
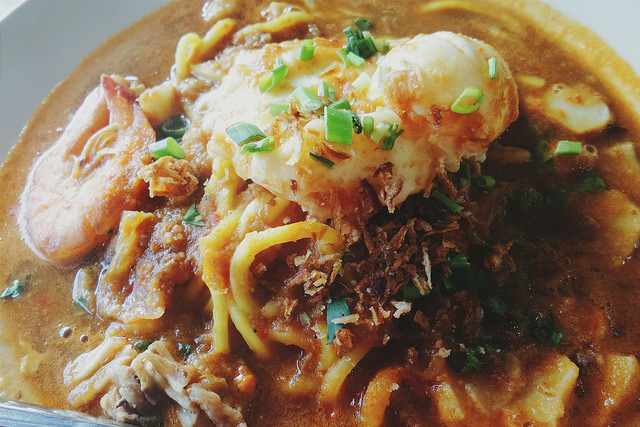
- Mee Bandung Muar
- Alternative names: Mee bandung
- Type: Noodles
- Place of origin: Malaysia
- Region or state: Johor

Mee Bandung Muar, or simply mee bandung (Jawi: مي باندوڠ), is a Malaysian noodle dish which originated in Muar, Johor. It is made with yellow noodles, egg, a thick gravy, and meats and vegetables.

The word bandung is derived from the literal meaning of the word in the Malay language, which means "mixture", "combined", "coupled", "doubles" or "pairs", as is illustrated in several Malay words like Sirap bandung (rose syrup beverage mixed with condensed milk) and Rumah berbandung (semi-detached or duplex house).

Mee bandung was originally made with yellow noodles, egg and a thick broth-gravy made of dried shrimps, onion, spices, shrimp paste and chilies. Later, prawn, meat, fish cakes and vegetables were added. Variants include versions with giant freshwater prawn, lobster or even cattle's thighbone, which is known as Gear Box.

Mee Bandung Muar is available throughout Malaysia and Singapore, although the version served in Muar district has a reputation as the best. It was reported to be a favourite of the Johor's Sultan Ibrahim Ismail, former Singapore's President S R Nathan and the celebrity chef Chef Wan.

== Gallery ==
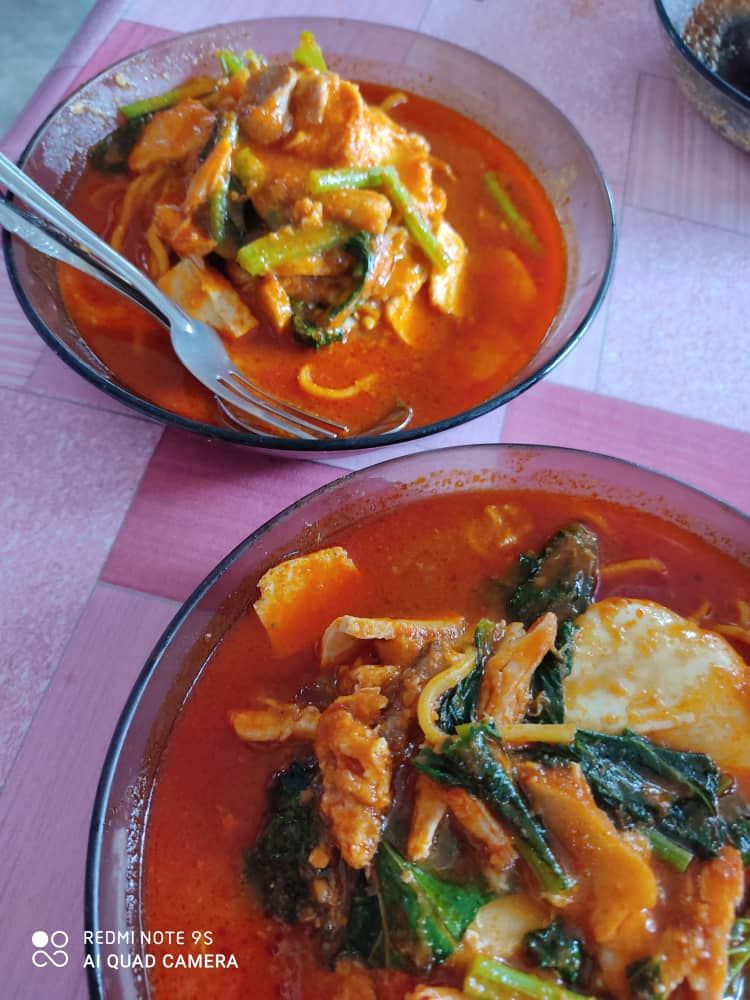
Mee Bandung in Muar.

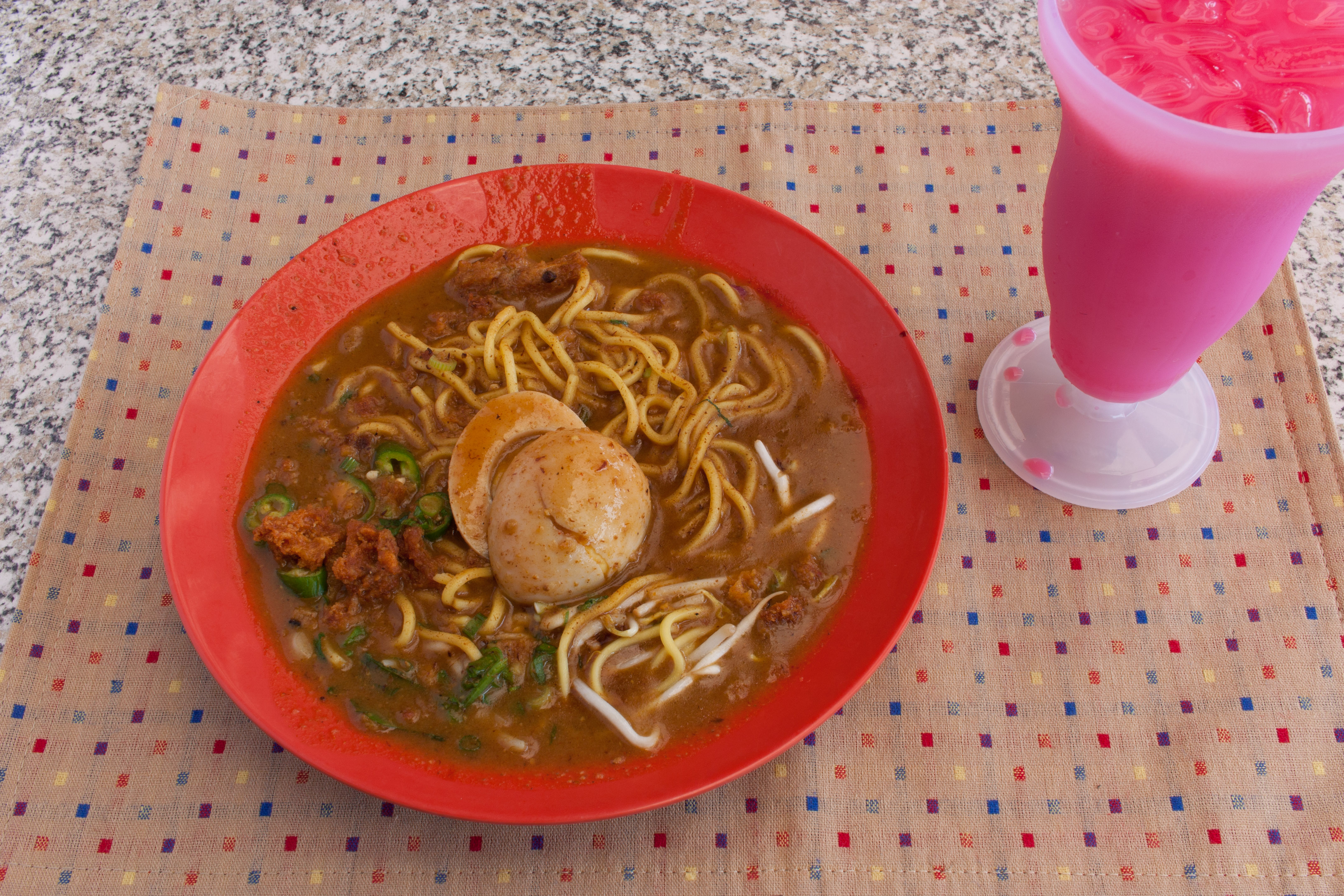
Mee Bandung and Sirap Bandung drink.

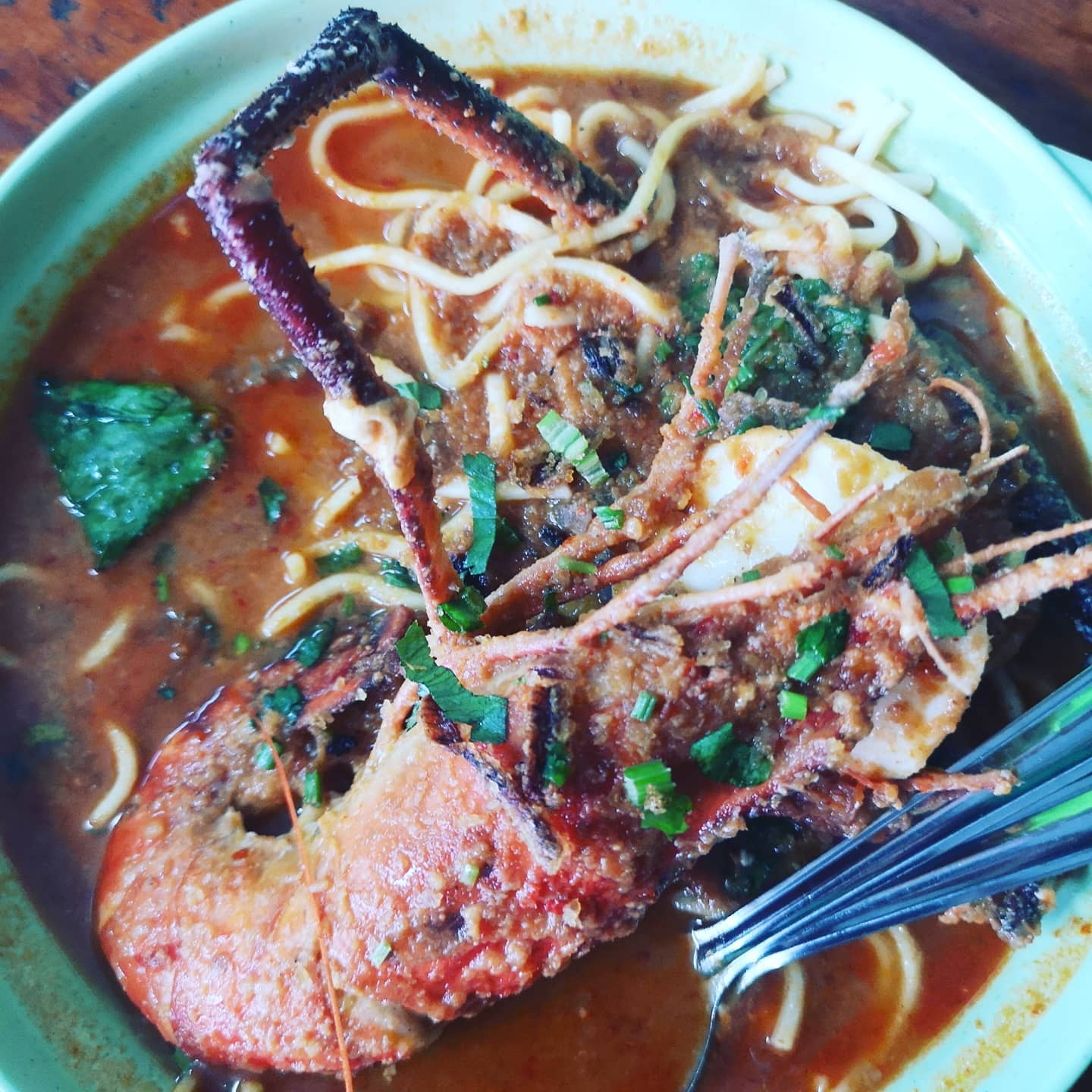
Mee Bandung with giant freshwater prawn.

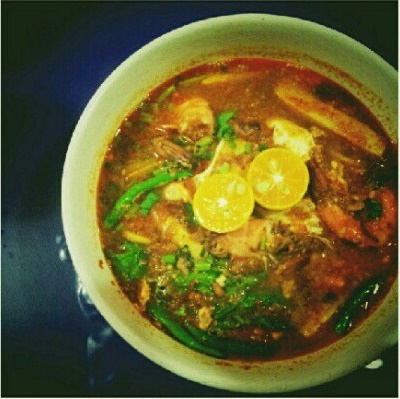
A bowl of mee bandung

== See also ==
- Bandung (drink)
- Mee rebus
- List of Malaysian dishes
- Malaysian cuisine
