= Bandung International Airport =

Bandung International Airport may refer to:

- Husein Sastranegara Airport
- Kertajati International Airport

== See also ==
- Bandung (disambiguation)
