= Calpis =

Japanese uncarbonated soft drink

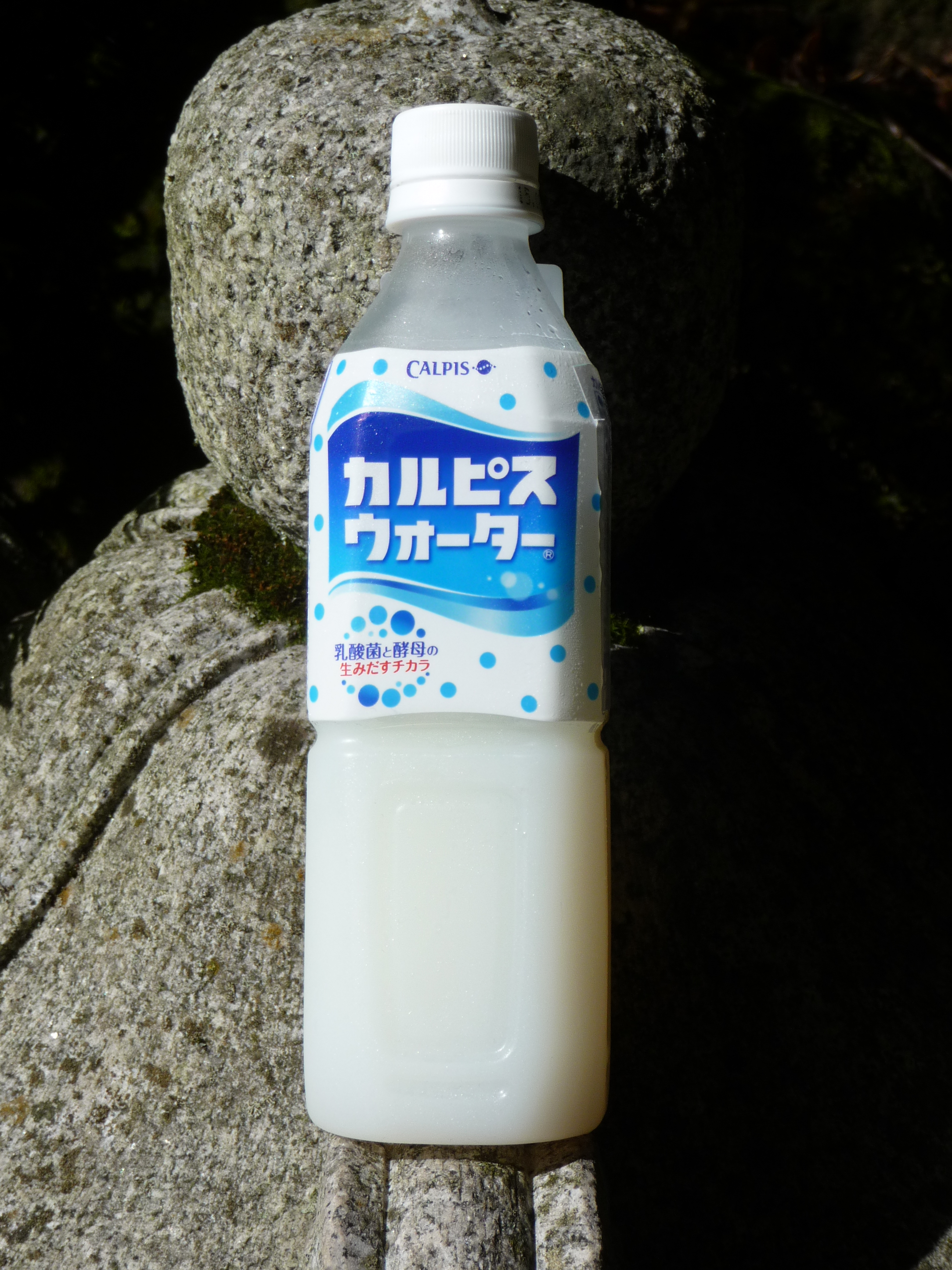
- A bottle of Calpis Water
- Type: Concentrate
- Inventor: Kaiun Mishima
- Inception: 1919
- Manufacturer: Calpis Co., Ltd.
- Website: calpis.info

Calpis Co., Ltd.
- Native name: カルピス株式会社
- Romanized name: Karupisu Kabushiki-gaisha
- Type: Subsidiary
- Industry: Soft drinks
- Founded: April 1916; 110 years ago
- Founder: Kaiun Mishima
- Headquarters: Shibuya, Tokyo, Japan
- Parent: Asahi Breweries
- Website: calpis.info

Calpis (Japanese: カルピス, Hepburn: Karupisu), sold in North America as Calpico, is a Japanese probiotic milk beverage manufactured by Calpis Co., Ltd. (カルピス株式会社, Karupisu Kabushiki-gaisha), a subsidiary of Asahi Breweries headquartered in Shibuya, Tokyo. The beverage has a light, somewhat milky, and slightly acidic flavour, similar to plain or vanilla-flavoured yogurt or Yakult. Its ingredients include water, dry milk, and lactic acid, and it is produced by lactic acid fermentation.

The drink is sold as a concentrate, which is mixed with water or sometimes milk just before consumption. A pre-diluted version known as Calpis Water (カルピスウォーター, Karupisu Wōtā), or its carbonated variety, known as Calpis Soda (カルピスソーダ, Karupisu Sōda), is also available. It is also used to flavour kakigōri and as a mixer for cocktails and chūhai.

== History ==
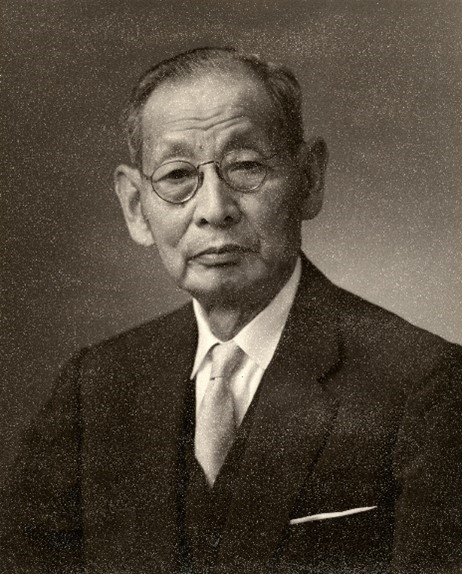
Kaiun Mishima, the original creator of Calpis

The founder of Calpis, Kaiun Mishima, travelled to Mongolia in 1902, encountering a traditional cultured milk product known as airag (called kumis throughout most of Central Asia). The active ingredient in airag, responsible for its unique flavour, is lactic acid produced by lactobacilli bacteria. After the airag he consumed helped return his digestion to normal, Mishima was inspired to develop his own version.

Daigomi, launched in 1916, was made by culturing cream with lactic acid bacteria. However, it was discontinued because of two major flaws: the amount of cream extracted from milk was inadequate for mass production, and there was a surplus of skimmed milk created as a by-product. Afterwards, Mishima created Daigoso by culturing skimmed milk with lactic acid bacteria. However, the product was also discontinued because of poor sales. His last unsuccessful attempt was Lacto Caramel, a product that contained live lactic acid bacteria. It was discontinued because the product melted during the summer.

Calpis was created by chance when Mishima added sugar to Daigoso and left it overnight. It was officially released on July 7, 1919, at the price of ¥1.60 per bottle. Diluting Calpis with water proved to be economical, quickly garnering popularity with customers, along with the catchphrase "the taste of first love". Calpis initially had the image of being a special drink, being reserved for special occasions or gifts; it was only around 1965 that it began to be treated as a normal beverage in ordinary households.

Orange-flavoured Calpis was released in 1958, with pineapple- and grape-flavoured versions following two years later. A carbonated version called Calpis Soda was also released in 1974. In 1973, sales plummeted after the price was raised. Within the first year of its initial release in 1991, 20.5 million cases of pre-diluted Calpis Water had been sold. It was also around this time that the company moved towards the use of paper containers and plastic bottles.

=== Name ===
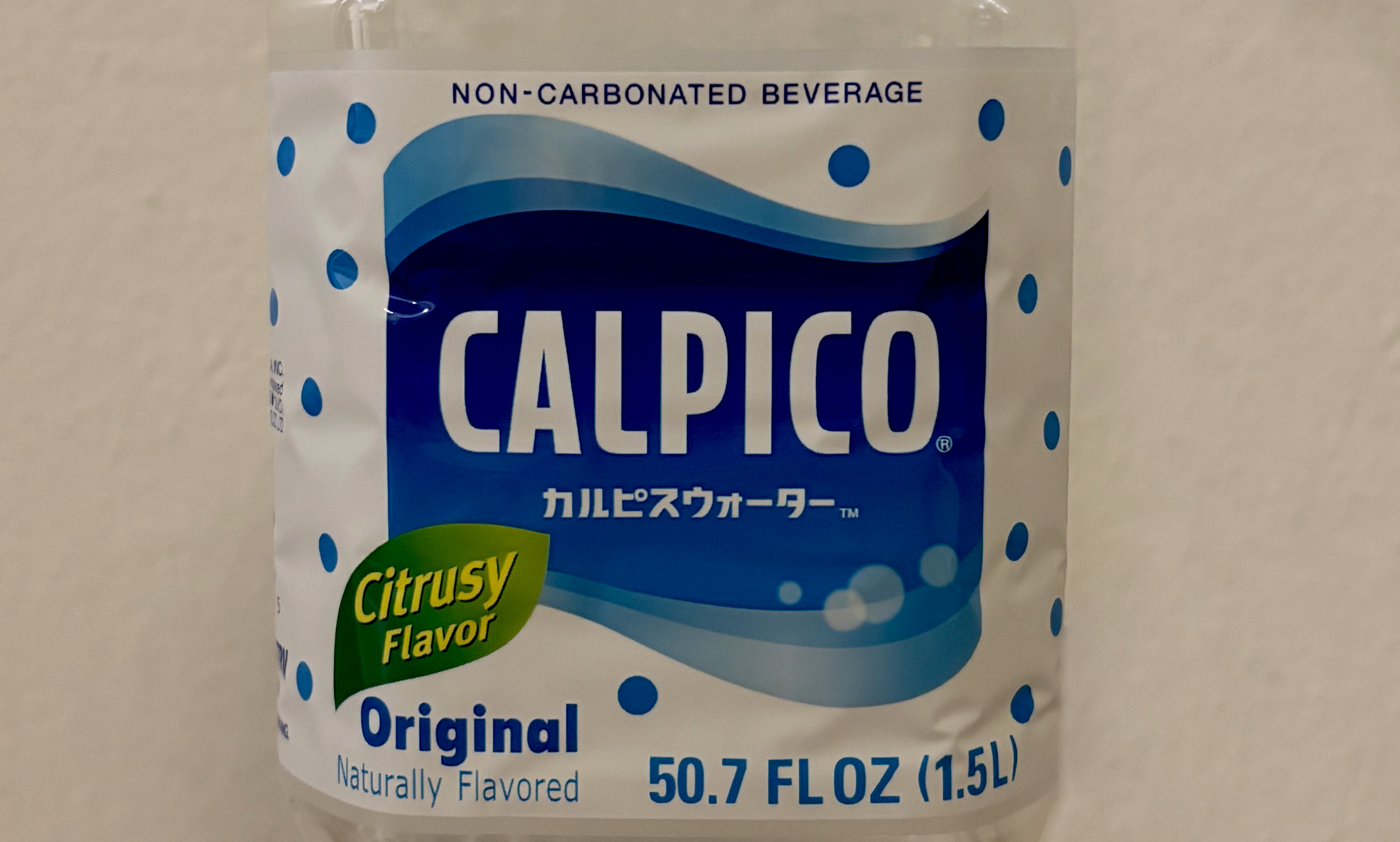
A bottle of Calpis in USA, showing Calpico branding and design

The first two iterations of what would become Calpis, Daigomi and Daigoso, were named after daigo (醍醐), the Japanese word for sarpir-maṇḍa, regarded as the greatest of all flavours in Buddhism. Mishima wanted to do the same for Calpis and initially named it Calpir, a portmanteau of cal from calcium and pir from sarpir-maṇḍa. However, after consulting musician Kōsaku Yamada and Buddhist priest Kaigyoku Watanabe, Mishima chose pis from the Sanskrit sarpiṣ instead.

Primarily in North America, the name Calpico is used in place of Calpis to avoid associations with "piss", an English slang word for urine (though the "カルピス" in katakana remains on the packaging).

== Packaging ==
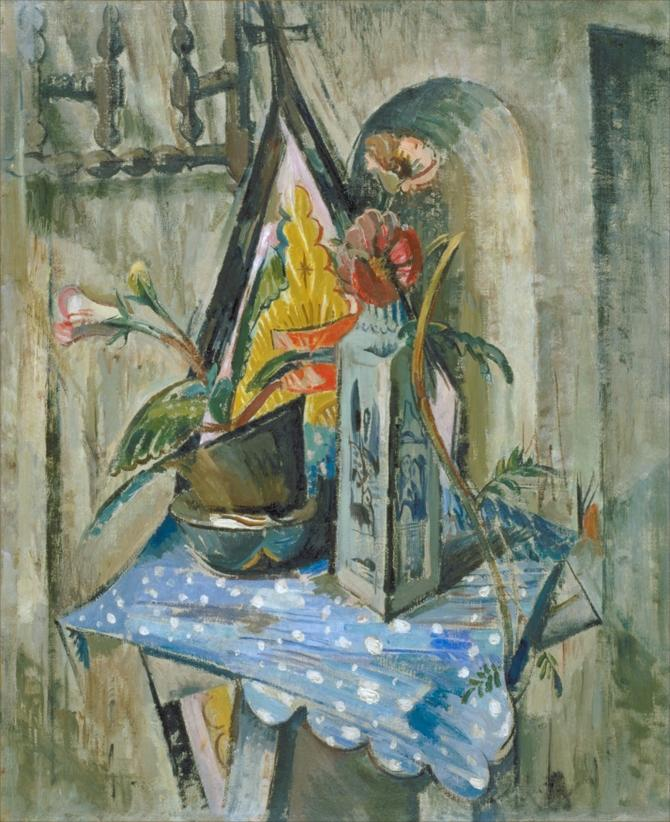
Still life with Calpis wrapping paper (1923), by Nakamura Tsune; launched on the day of the Star Festival in 1919, the white dots on a blue background represent stars in the Milky Way

The polka dot packaging used to consist of white dots against a blue background until the colours were inverted in 1953. The design was intended to represent the Milky Way, in reference to the Japanese Tanabata festival.

In 1919, Calpis held an international poster exhibition in collaboration with the Ministry of Foreign Affairs. The contest was held to provide aid to struggling European painters due to inflation caused by World War I. After German painter Otto Dünkelsbühler won 3rd place, Calpis began using a new logo in 1923 based on his design. It featured an illustration of a black man with large lips and a Panama hat drinking from a glass using a straw. As the logo came to be considered offensive, the black and white were first reversed, and then the logo was subsequently dropped altogether in January 1990. The complaint was initially filed by 12-year-old Futoshi Arita, a member of The Association to Stop Racism Against Blacks.

== See also ==
- Actimel
- Fermented milk products
- List of fermented foods
- Milkis
- Pocari Sweat
- Wahaha
