= Egg cream =

Cold beverage

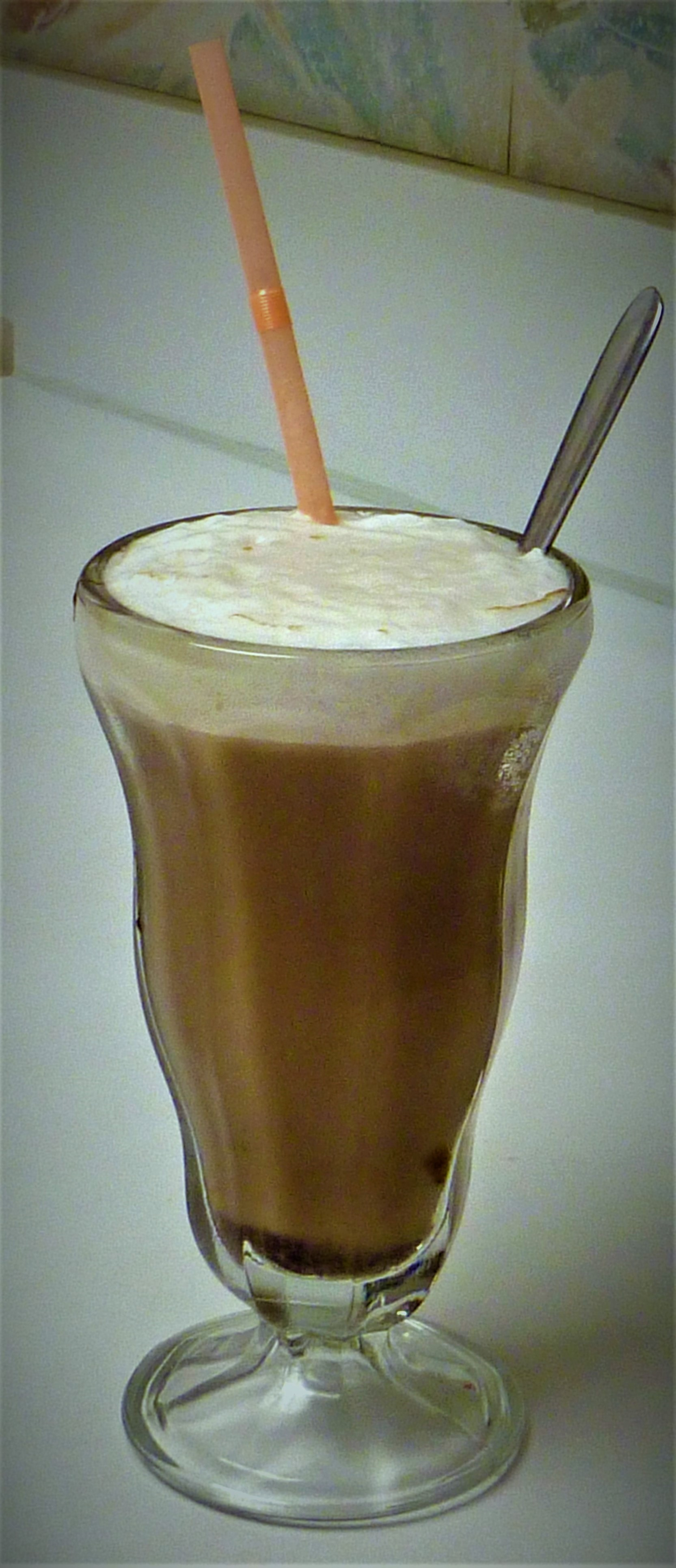
- Type: Fountain beverage
- Origin: United States
- Flavor: Various; primarily chocolate, but can be any flavored syrup
- Ingredients: Flavored syrup, milk, soda water

An egg cream is a cold beverage consisting of milk, carbonated water, and flavored syrup (typically chocolate or vanilla), as a substitute for an ice cream float. Ideally, the glass is left with 2/3 liquid and 1/3 foamy head. Despite the name, the drink contains neither eggs nor cream.

The egg cream is primarily a fountain drink. It has been bottled under various brands, but is still not well-represented on shelves in the US, partially due to the drink's tendency to go flat quickly when prepared fresh, with the New York state-based beverage company AriZona debuting a styled flavored canned drink in homage of nostalgic legacy in September 2025 that is sold in specialty snack stores.

== Etymology theories and speculations ==
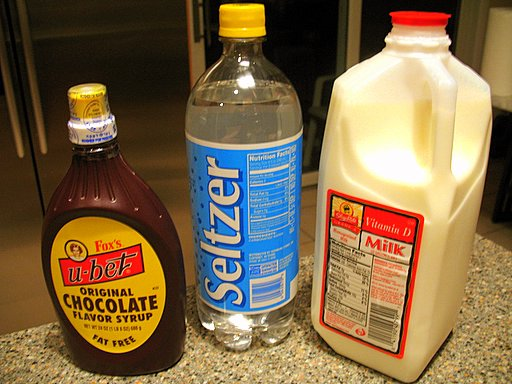
The ingredients of an egg cream: Fox's U-Bet chocolate syrup, seltzer, and whole milk

The peculiarity that an egg cream contains neither eggs nor cream has been explained in various ways. Stanley Auster, who claims that his grandfather invented the beverage, has said that the origins of the name are "lost in time."

The egg cream originated among Yiddish-speaking Eastern European Jewish immigrants in New York City, so one explanation claims that egg is a corruption of the Yiddish echt ('genuine' or 'real'), making an egg cream a "good cream".

Another explanation comes from reports that it grew out of a request for chocolat et crème from someone, possibly the actor Boris Thomashefsky (who had experienced a similar drink in Paris). His heavy accent altered the name into something like "egg cream," which then developed into the current term.

The food historian Andrew F. Smith writes: "During the 1880s, a popular specialty was made with chocolate syrup, cream, and raw eggs mixed into soda water. In poorer neighborhoods, a less expensive version of this treat was created, called the Egg Cream (made without the eggs or cream)." In fact, an 1850 source already presents a similar egg cream, but without the soda water and flavored differently: "How to Make Egg Cream. Take the yolk of an egg, with a dessert spoonful of cream or new milk, and, if convenient, add two drops of oil of cinnamon." In 1885, George Peltz showed the froth being created by whipping the egg: "Egg Cream.—Beat a raw egg to a stiff froth; add a tablespoonful of white sugar and a half wineglass of good blackberry wine; add half a glass of cream; beat together thoroughly, and use at once."

The term "egg cream" then was in fact used for mixtures that included both before it came to be used — by a process that is not well-documented — for a drink that included neither.

== See also ==
- Dirty soda – Soft drink mixture
- Italian soda – Soft drink
- Milkis – South Korean soft drink
- Pilk – Drink made from Pepsi and milk
- Seltzer – Water containing dissolved carbon dioxide gas
- List of chocolate beverages – A list of notable beverages flavoured with chocolate
