= Bandung (drink) =

Southeast Asian milk drink

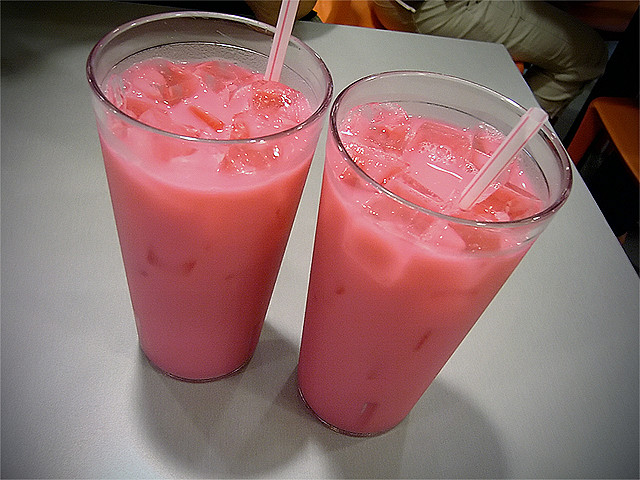
- Two glasses of bandung
- Type: Drink
- Place of origin: Singapore
- Region or state: Maritime Southeast Asia
- Associated cuisine: Brunei; Indonesia; Malaysia; Singapore
- Main ingredients: Evaporated milk; condensed milk; rose; cordial syrup
- Variations: Soda gembira

Bandung, sirap bandung, air bandung, iced bandung or rose syrup drink is a drink popular in Maritime Southeast Asia, notably in Brunei, Indonesia, Malaysia and Singapore. It consists of evaporated milk or condensed milk flavoured with rose syrup (rose cordial), giving it a pink colour.

== Regional names ==
The term bandung means "pairs", while sirap means "syrup" and air means "water" in the Malay and Indonesian languages, and the sirap refers to the rose-flavoured base syrup. More broadly, bandung refers to anything that is mixed from other ingredients or comes in pairs, such as the term rumah berbandung to refer to a semi-detached house, or "mee bandung" which refers to a noodle dish. The name has no connection to the city of Bandung in Indonesia, but a variant of the drink can be found there as "soda gembira".

== Details ==
Originating out of Singapore in the early 20th century during its time as an important British colonial entrepôt, Bandung is a favourite beverage especially among the Singaporean Malay community and subsequently the Malay communities of Southeast Asia. It is usually served during Iftar in Ramadan month or wedding receptions with other foods such as nasi beriani or rendang. Modern innovations include adding grass jelly or soda water and are served as street food especially at night markets.

== Variations ==
The soda water variant may be more commonly known as Soda gembira by Indonesians, although it has a distinct taste to Bandung due to the addition of a carbonated soft drink, such as Fanta. It may be bought pre-mixed or made at home. In Malaysia, the drink is usually served with grass jelly (bandung cincau) which is sometimes mixed with lychee puree (bandung cincau laici) or basil seed/chia seed (bandung selasih).

Catering to local tastes and culinary traditions, Singapore's McDonald's occasionally releases desserts inspired by the drink's taste in the country, including Bandung-flavoured McFlurry, sundae, and soft serve.

== See also ==
- Nom yen
- Rooh Afza
- Sharbat
- Falooda
