= Soda gembira =

Indonesian drink

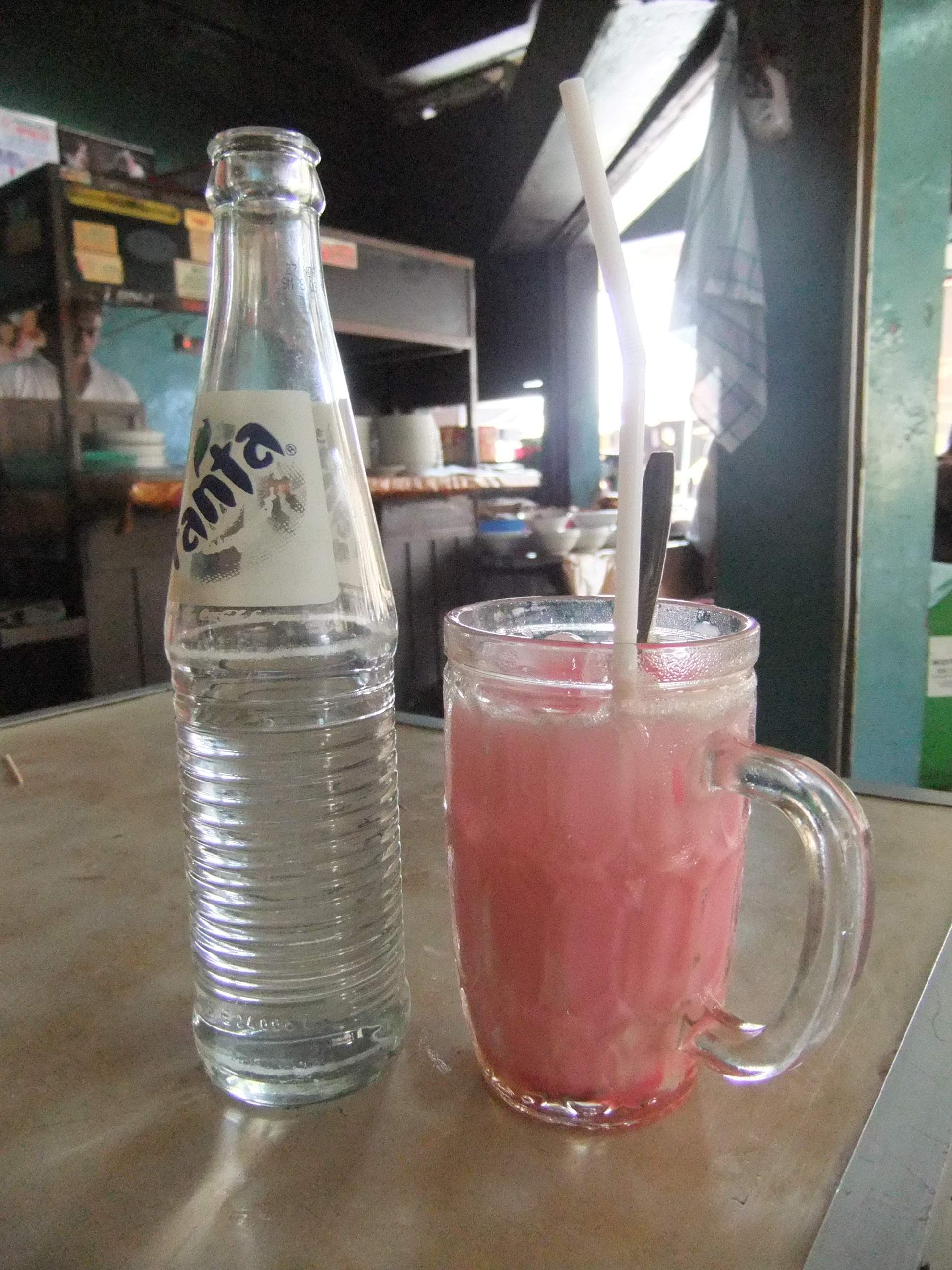
- A glass of soda gembira with bottle
- Type: Drink
- Course: Beverage, dessert
- Place of origin: Indonesia
- Region or state: Nationwide
- Serving temperature: Cold
- Main ingredients: Carbonated water/strawberry Fanta, condensed milk, syrup, ice.

Soda gembira (lit. 'happy soda') is an Indonesian drink. It is made up of cocopandan syrup, condensed milk, seltzer and ice. A related drink, Soda Susu, uses carbonated water instead of strawberry-flavored Fanta.

Soda gembira is a popular beverage in Indonesia. It is usually served during iftar in Ramadan and at wedding receptions, alongside foods including bakso, nasi goreng, rendang, and soto.

== Details ==
Soda Gembira is a typical Indonesian drink. It is famous for its combination of sweet and refreshing flavors. This drink is made from a combination of red syrup, which is usually cocopandan flavored, sweetened condensed milk, and carbonated soda, such as Sprite or Fanta. The red syrup provides a bright color and distinctive sweet taste, while the sweetened condensed milk adds a creamy texture. The soda provides a refreshing carbonated sensation, making it an ideal drink for hot weather or special occasions.

The origins of Soda Gembira do not have a specific history. However, Dutch colonial influence likely played a role in the use of sweetened condensed milk, which was starting to become popular in Indonesia at that time. On the other hand, the use of sweet syrup was already part of the local beverage tradition in Indonesia, while the introduction of soda drinks to Indonesia in the mid-20th century paved the way for the creation of this drink. The combination of local ingredients, such as cocopandan syrup with carbonated soda, created a new, unique taste that was loved by many people. Soda Gembira is often served in food stalls, especially in Padang restaurants or other traditional eateries. This drink is not only popular because of its pleasant taste but also because of its attractive appearance with a striking red color that symbolizes joy. In some variations, this drink can be served with ice cubes or additions such as basil and nata de coco to enrich the texture.

In addition to being a favorite choice in restaurants and food stalls, Soda Gembira also often appears at various family events or celebrations as a dessert drink. With a strong sweet taste and refreshing carbonated sensation, Soda Gembira is a symbol of a relaxed and happy atmosphere, in accordance with its name, which reflects joy and pleasure.

== See also ==
- Cuisine of Indonesia
- List of Indonesian drinks
- Carbonated water
- Rose water
- Bandung (drink)
