= Fanta cake =

German cake

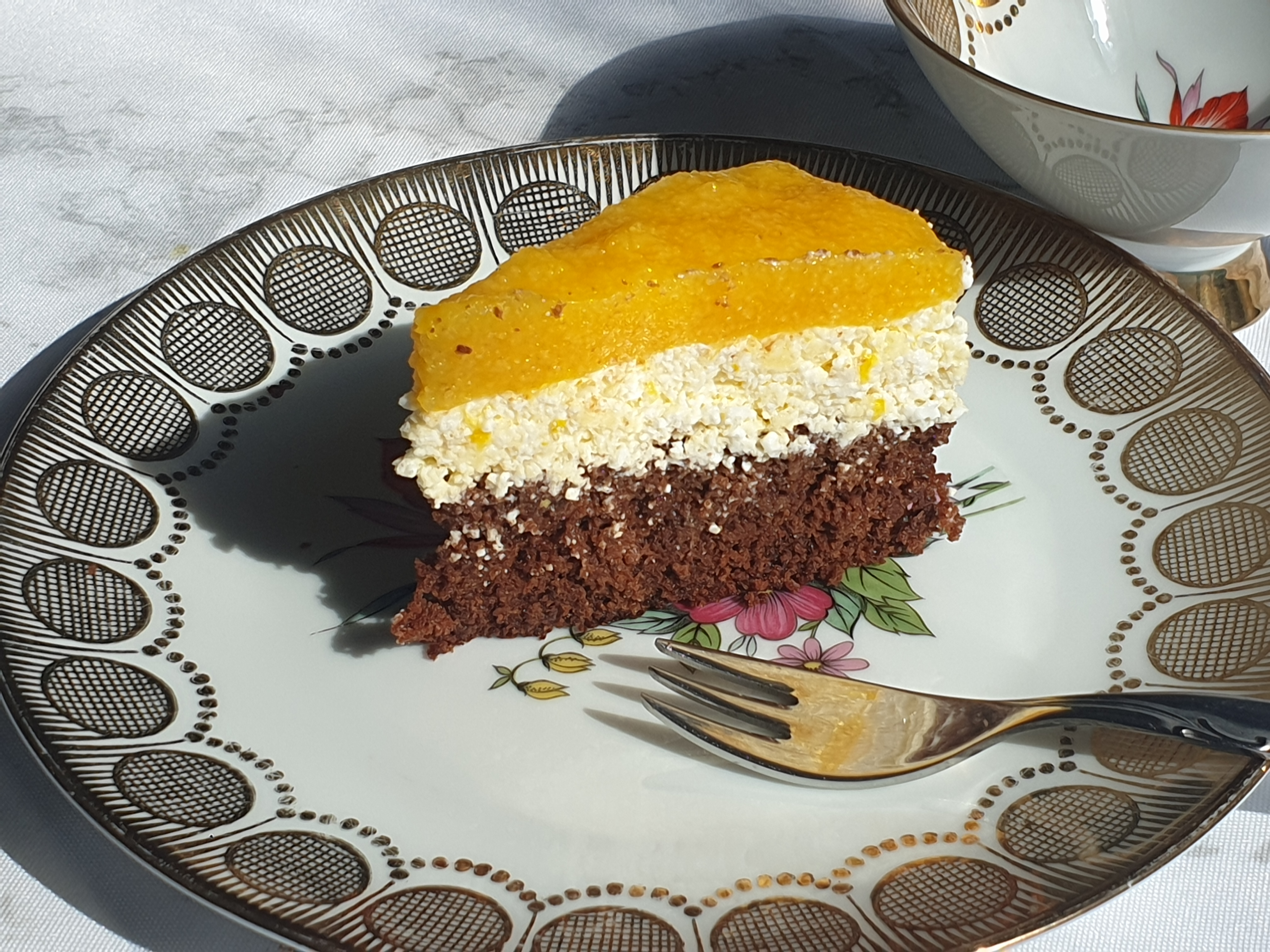
- A slice of Fanta cake
- Type: Cake
- Course: Dessert
- Place of origin: Germany
- Associated cuisine: German cuisine
- Main ingredients: Fanta; sugar

Fanta cake (German: Fantakuchen, pronounced [ˈfantaˌkuːxən]) is a cake of German origin. It is made with a sponge cake base. The primary ingredient is Fanta, which makes it fluffier than typical sponge cakes due to the drink's carbonation. The cake is topped with either a simple lemon glaze or a creamy layer made of heavy sour cream, whipped cream or sugar. It is typically served at birthday parties, work events, or celebrations.

== Similar cakes ==
Similar recipes use other carbonated, artificial or fruit-flavored beverages. For instance, Spritekuchen is made with Sprite and Limokuchen with lemonade.

In the Southern United States, similar cakes using 7 Up, Coca-Cola and Dr Pepper emerged in the middle-20th century. Cracker Barrel introduced "Coke-Cake" to its menu in the 1990s, with iterations including a double chocolate fudge Coca-Cola cake.

Several types of beer cake are similarly partially leavened by beer's carbonation.

== See also ==
- 7 Up cake
- Water pie
- List of German desserts
