= Affogato =

Italian coffee-based dessert

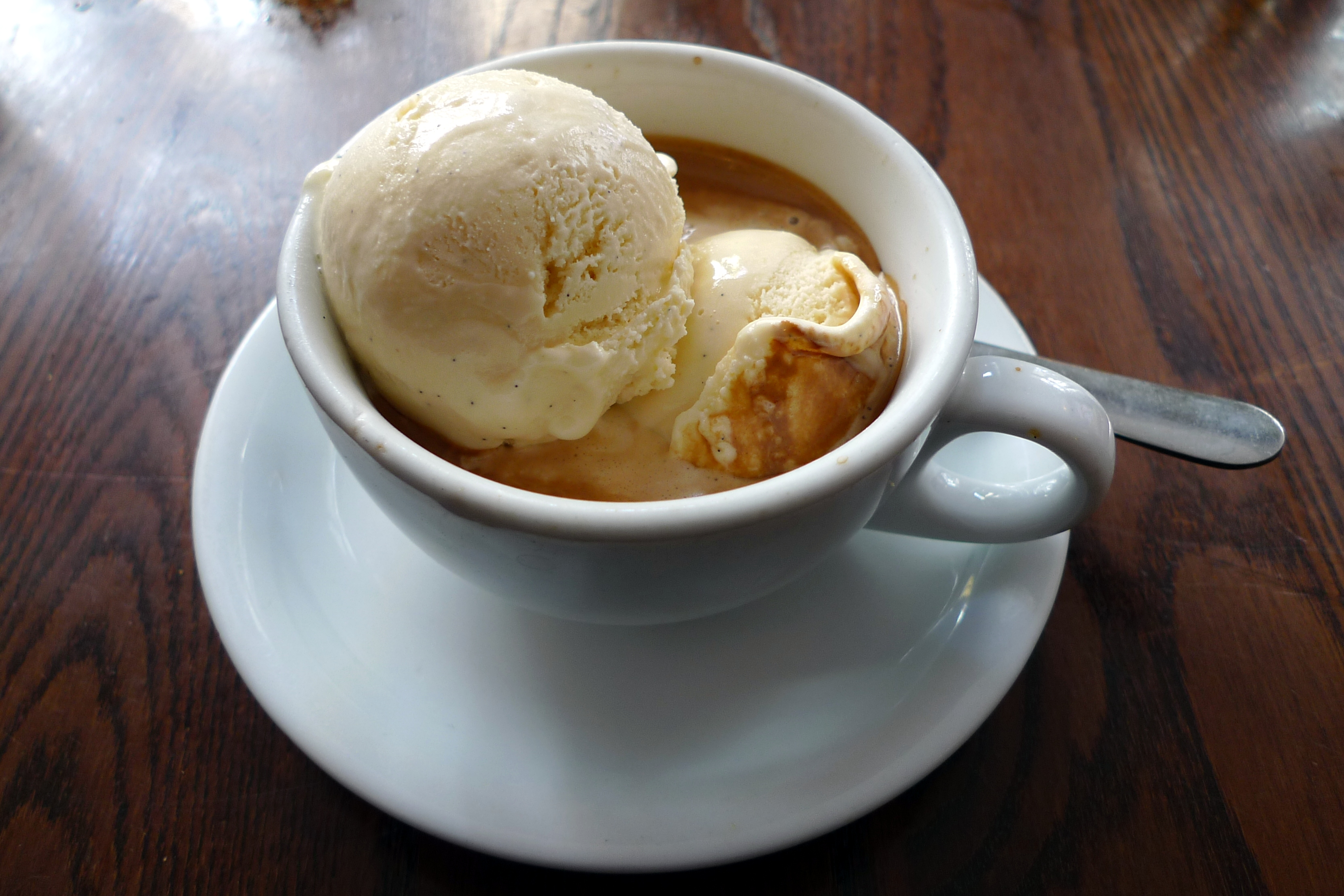
- Alternative names: Affogato al caffè
- Type: Dessert
- Place of origin: Italy
- Main ingredients: Gelato, espresso

Affogato (/ˌɑːfəˈɡɑːtoʊ, ˌæf-/), or more fully affogato al caffè (lit. 'drowned in coffee'), is an Italian dessert comprising a scoop of gelato, either fiordilatte (plain milk-flavored) or vanilla, topped with espresso. Some variations add a shot of amaretto, bicerin, Kahlúa, or other liqueur. Another variation with a caramel espresso shot with vanilla ice cream is known as the Afragato.

== Variations ==
Cafés usually serve the affogato in a tall glass with a narrow bottom, allowing the gelato to melt and combine with the espresso at the bottom of the glass. Occasionally, coconut, berries, honeycomb, and multiple flavors of gelato are added. Biscotti can also be served alongside. In Italy the affogato is often categorized as a dessert, while outside of Italy restaurants and cafés categorize it as a beverage. Affogatos are often consumed as a post-meal coffee-dessert combo eaten with a spoon or drunk with a straw.

While the recipe of the affogato is more or less standard in Italy, consisting of a scoop of fiordilatte (plain milk-flavored) or vanilla gelato topped with a shot of espresso, variations exist in European and North American restaurants.

Various desserts of gelato in other liquids are documented, including whisky, hot chocolate, kirsch, vin santo, and port wine.

== Etymology ==
The Italian word affogato translates to “drowned", describing the process of covering gelato or ice cream in espresso.

== Origins ==
The origins of affogato are uncertain, and no specific inventor or date of invention has been established. It is believed to have originated in Italian cafés, where espresso and gelato were regularly served, during the mid-1900s. The dessert spread internationally in the late-1900s with the development of modern café culture. English-language dictionaries document the use of affogato in 1988.

== See also ==
- List of coffee drinks
