= Milkis =

South Korean soft drink

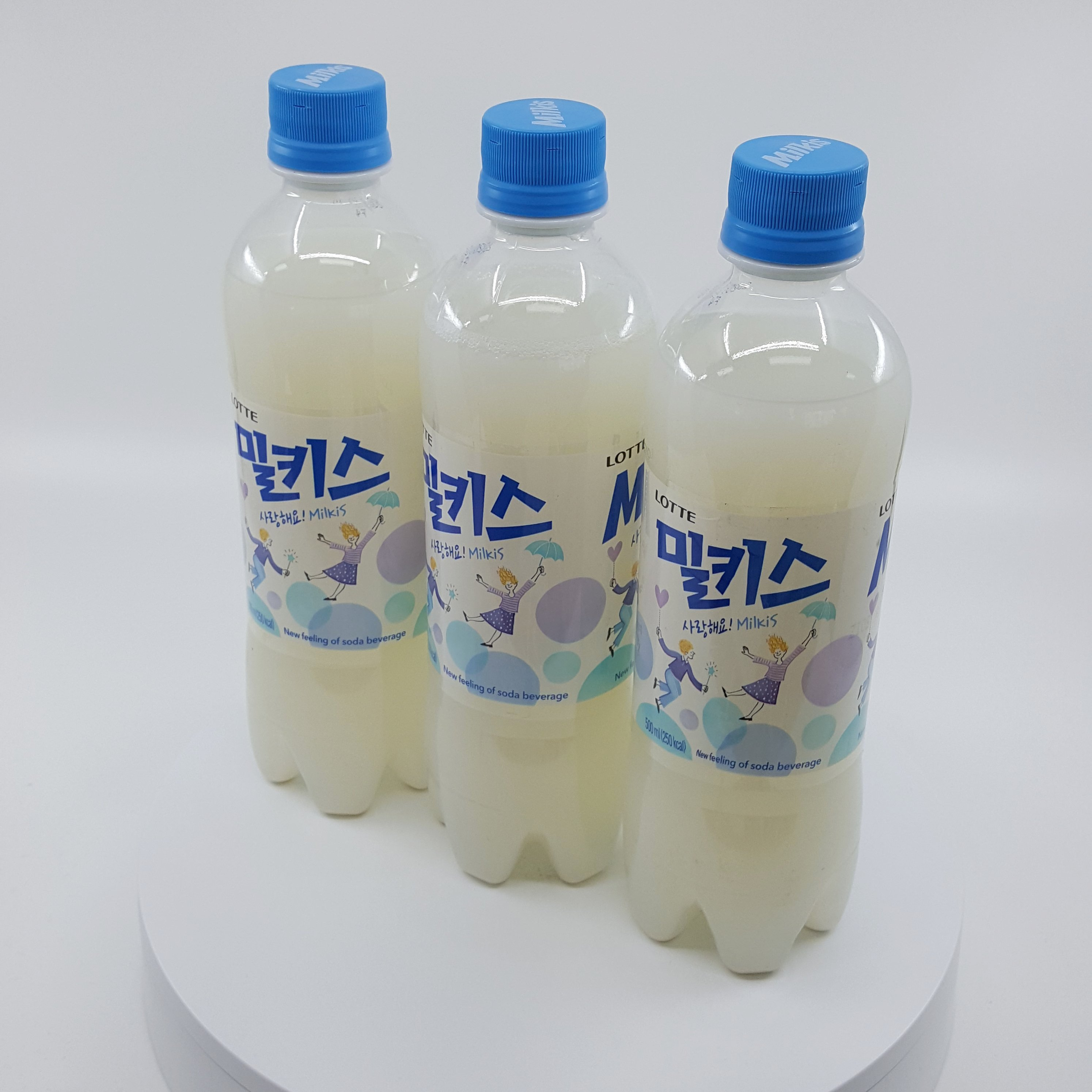
- Type: Soft drink
- Manufacturer: Lotte Chilsung
- Origin: South Korea
- Introduced: 1989
- Color: Various milky tones
- Flavor: Regular, strawberry, orange, muskmelon, mango, peach, pineapple, banana, apple, grape, lemon.
- Related products: Chilsung Cider
- Website: http://company.lottechilsung.co.kr/

Milkis (Korean: 밀키스; RR: Milkiseu) is a South Korean soft drink produced by Lotte Chilsung, a South Korean beverage company.

It combines many of the common elements of traditional carbonated beverages such as sugar and carbonated water with milk to create a creamy taste; its label proclaims "New feeling of soda beverage". As of 2024, U.S.-market Milkis cans state "Korea's No.1 Cream Soda".

Milkis is available in orange, strawberry, mango, melon, banana, peach, apple, and classic (regular) flavors; the classic flavor is also featured as a glaze in pastries. It is a popular beverage in South Korea, and it is available worldwide.

== History ==
Hong Kong actor Chow Yun-fat appeared in Milkis' television advertisements. Chow was enjoying a huge popularity from the success of the film A Better Tomorrow and him saying the catchphrase "Saranghaeyo, Milkis!" (사랑해요, 밀키스!; lit. 'I love you, Milkis!') with a strong accent became a huge hit; sales soared and the catchphrase remains popular.

In February 2023, Lotte Chilsung Beverage launched Milkis Zero, a zero-calorie version of the original drink. The product was introduced in response to growing consumer demand for sugar-free and zero-calorie beverages.https://view.asiae.co.kr/en/article/2023021308445646833?utm_source=chatgpt.com

== Popularity abroad ==
The beverage has experienced a sharp increase in popularity in Taiwan. Chilsung began selling Milkis there in late 2020, exporting 200,000 cans. Demand increased rapidly, selling 2.3 million cans in 2021. 10 million cans were sold in the first 8 months of 2022 alone.

The drink has also seen success in Australia and the United States, selling 10 million cans in 2021, mainly through Asian supermarkets.

== See also ==
- Calpis
- List of Korean beverages
- Lotte Chilsung
- Korean cuisine
- Wahaha
- Yakult
