= Cream soda =

Soft drink with cream or vanilla

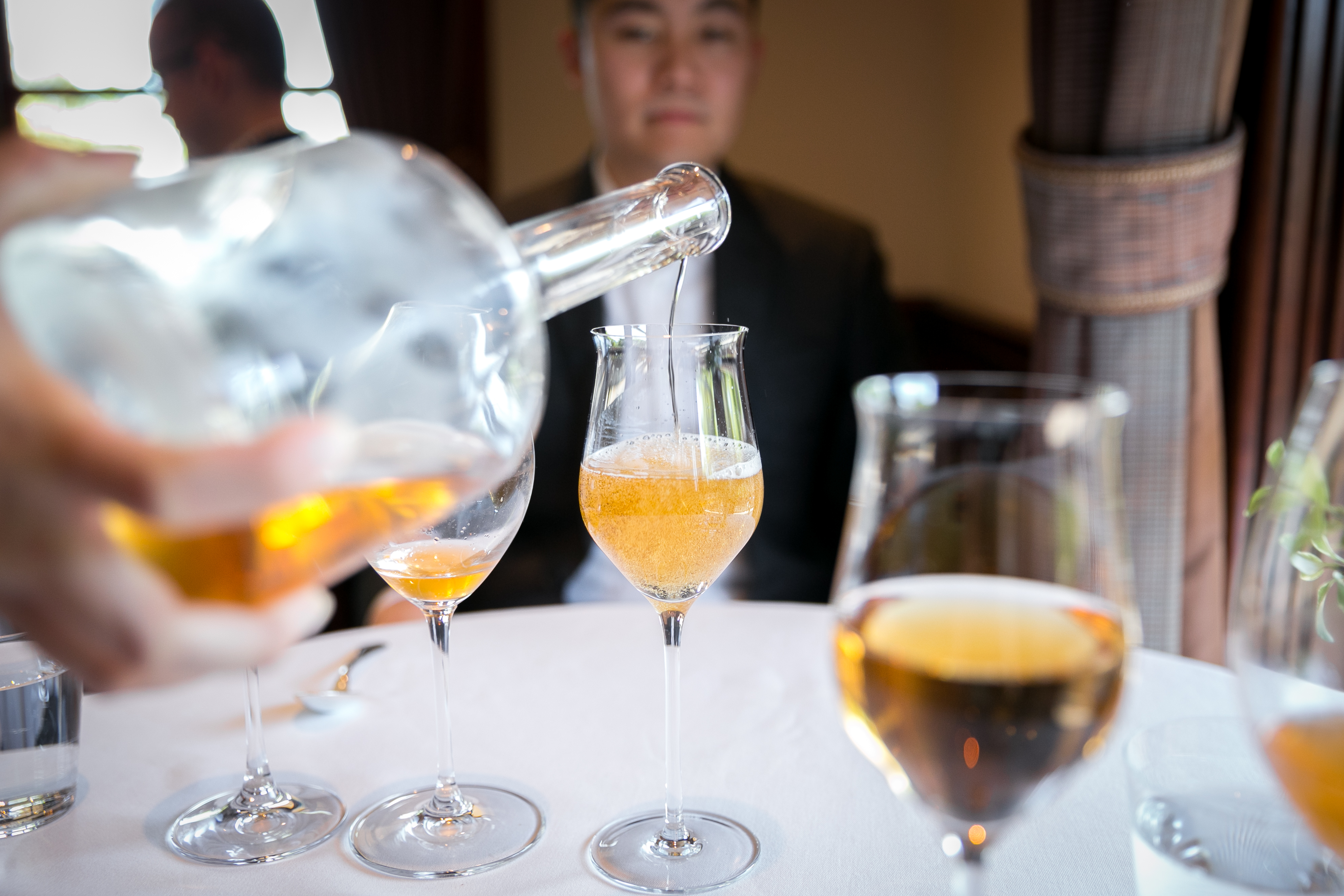
- Hand-crafted cream soda
- Origin: United States

Cream soda (also known as creme soda) is a sweet soft drink flavored with some form of cream or vanilla. Use of the term is diverse and a wide range of variations can be found worldwide.

== History and development ==
A recipe for cream soda written by E. M. Sheldon and published in Michigan Farmer in 1852 called for water, cream of tartar (potassium bitartrate), Epsom salts, sugar, egg, and milk to be mixed, then heated, then mixed again once cooled with water and a quarter teaspoonful of baking soda to make an effervescent drink. It was suggested as a temperance drink preferable to those of "Uncle Bacchus" and in compliance with the recently introduced Maine law. An alternative recipe can be found combining a soda of choice as well as whipped cream.

Alexander C. Howell of Vienna, New Jersey, was granted a patent for "cream soda-water" on June 27, 1865. Howell's cream soda-water was made with sodium bicarbonate, water, sugar, egg whites, wheat flour, and "any of the usual flavoring materials—such as oil of lemon, extracts of vanilla, pine-apple, to suit the taste". Before drinking, the cream soda-water was mixed with water and an acid, such as tartaric acid or citric acid. In Canada, James William Black of Berwick, Nova Scotia, was granted a U.S. patent on December 8, 1885, and a Canadian patent on July 5, 1886, for "ice-cream soda". Black's ice-cream soda, which contained whipped egg whites, sugar, lime juice, lemons, citric acid, flavoring, and bicarbonate of soda, was a concentrated syrup that could be reconstituted into an effervescent beverage by adding ordinary ice water. In the United States, Ugo H. Sodini helped to pioneer in the creation of vanilla cream soda.

== International variations ==
=== North and South America ===
==== United States ====
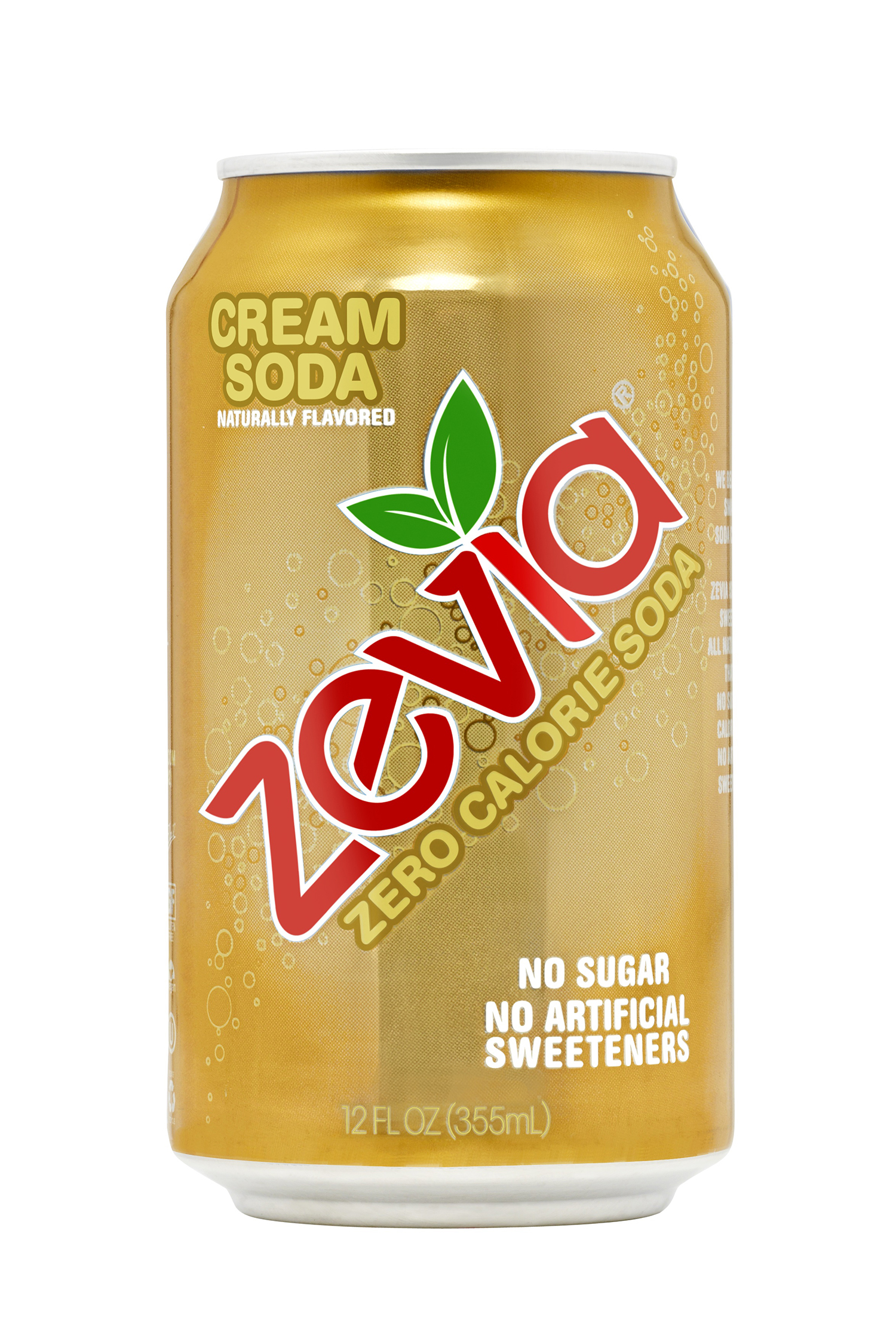
Zevia Cream Soda

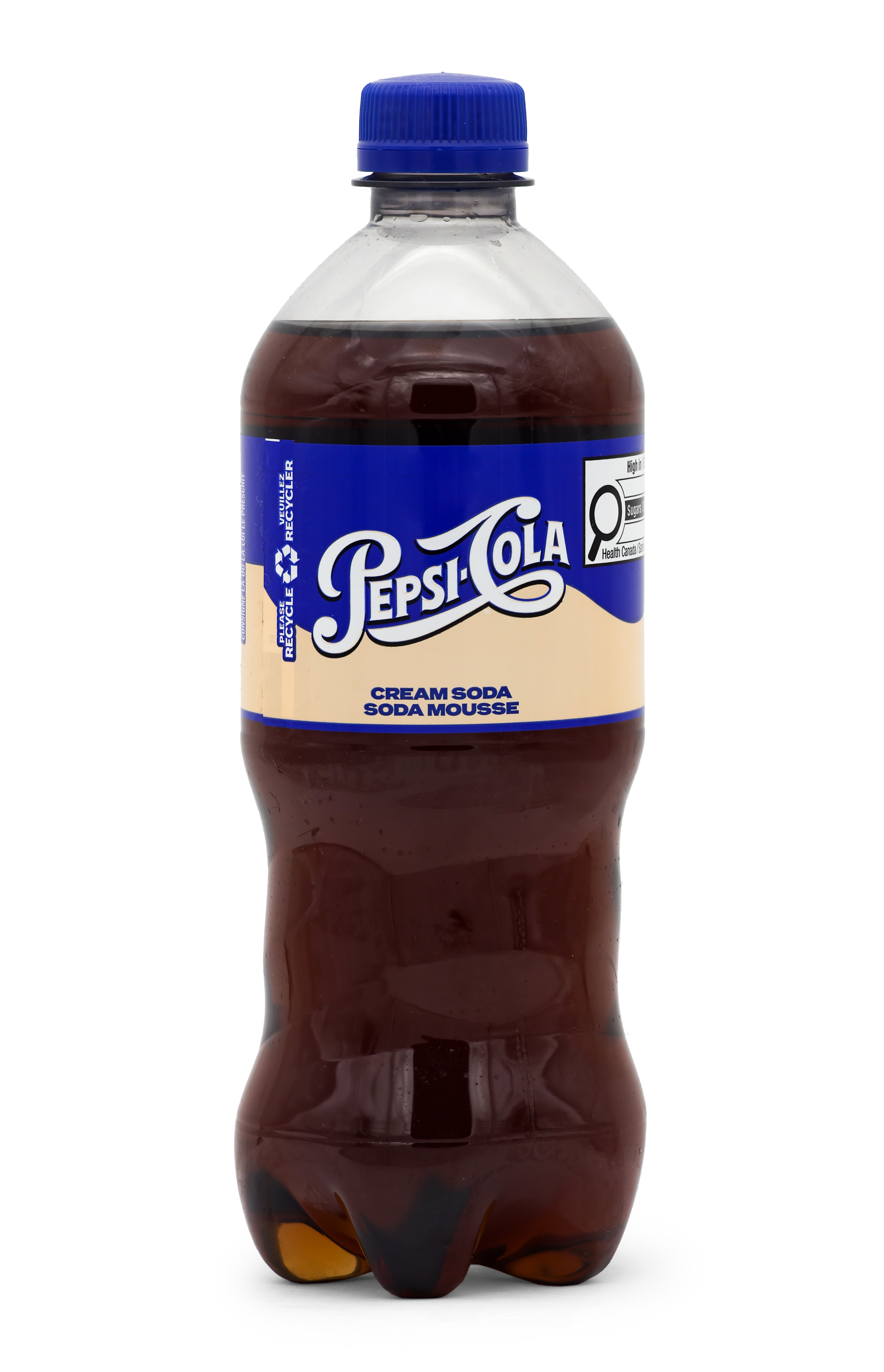
Pepsi-Cola Soda Shop cream soda

In the United States, cream soda is often vanilla-flavored and is either clear or colored a light golden brown or pink. Red, orange, and blue colored variants of the plain soda are also made.

Popular brands include:

- AriZona Soda Shaq
- A-Treat Cream Soda
- A&W Vanilla Cream Soda
- Big 8 Beverages White Cream Soda
- Barq's Red Creme Soda
- Big Red
- Blue Sky
- Boylan's Creme Vanilla
- Big Shot Cream Soda (New Orleans area)
- Canada Dry Vanilla Cream Soda
- Canfield's Swiss Creme (mainly in the Chicago area)
- Dad's Cream Soda
- Dang! That's Good Red Cream Soda
- Dr Pepper Vanilla Float
- Dr Pepper Cream Soda (Sold as Dr Pepper & Cream Soda, a mix of both beverages)
- Dr. Brown's (mainly in the New York City area, but also kosher delicatessens across the country)
- Faygo
- Fitz's Cream Soda and Cardinal Cream (St. Louis Area)
- Foxon Park (mainly in Connecticut)
- Hal's New York Seltzer Water - Vanilla Crème
- Hosmer Mountain (mainly in Connecticut)
- Henry Weinhard's Cream Soda
- IBC
- Jones Soda
- Jelly Belly French Vanilla Cream Soda
- Mug Cream Soda
- Original New York Seltzer Vanilla Cream Soda
- Pepsi Cream Soda
- Polar Beverages Cream Soda
- Shasta Creme Soda
- SodaStream Cream Soda Syrup
- Sprecher Brewery
- Stewart's
- Vess (Old St. Louis variety that is a deep pink)
- Virgil's Cream Soda
- White Rock Beverages
- Zevia

==== Canada ====
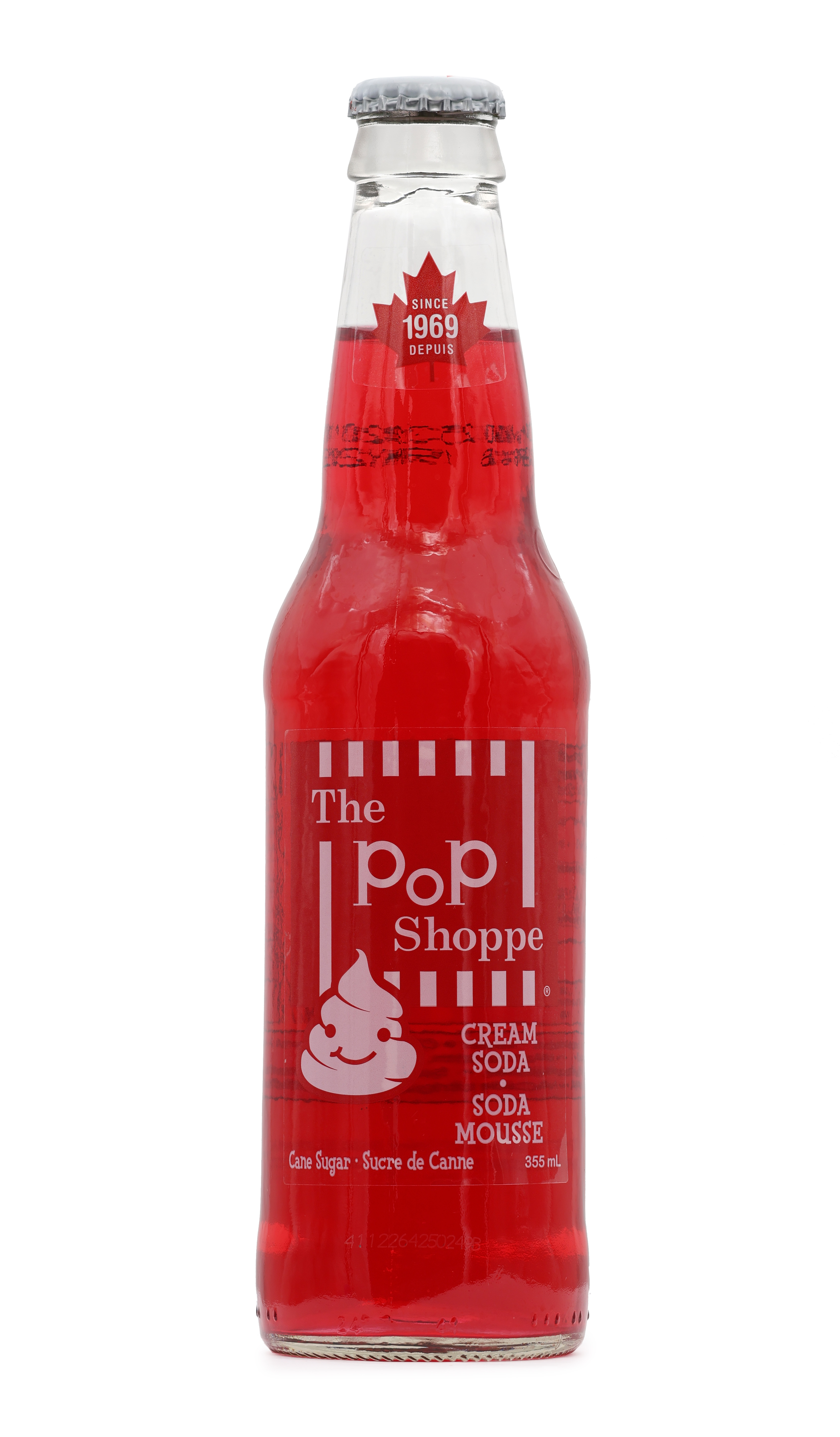
The Pop Shoppe cream soda

In Canada, cream soda is mostly pink with a taste reminiscent of grenadine, although clear versions can be found in Quebec and Atlantic Canada. Some brands, such as Fanta, market clear cream soda nationwide. Many brands have a long-lasting, foamy head.

Brands include:

- Barq's Cream Soda – clear
- Big 8 Cream Soda – pink and clear
- Cott Cream Soda
- Crush – pink and clear
- Fanta
- Jones Soda
- Kiri Cream Soda – clear
- Life Brand
- The Pop Shoppe – also markets a vodka-based alcoholic version
- President's Choice - clear
- Walmart Canada – US-style vanilla flavor

Some American brands are available in Canada as imports.

==== Caribbean and Latin America ====
Cream soda is usually served as a "red pop", particularly Fanta's Red Cream Soda. Champagne cola (also spelled "kola"), a soft drink similar to cream soda, is ubiquitous across the region. In the Caribbean there are several popular brands of clear, vanilla-flavored cream soda.

- Bigga (Jamaica)
- Tropical Crema Soda (El Salvador)
- DG Soft Drink Cream Soda (Jamaica)
- Colombiana (Colombia)
- Kola Román (Colombia)
- Frescolita (Venezuela) – a bubble gum-flavored soda
- Kola Dumbo (Venezuela) – a bubble gum-flavored soda
- Grapette (Venezuela) – a bubble gum-flavored soda
- Marbel (Venezuela) – a bubble gum-flavored soda
- Inca Kola (Peru) – sometimes considered a champagne cola, sometimes considered its own drink
- Old Jamaica Cream Soda (Jamaica)
- Solo Beverage Company (Trinidad)
- ToniCol (Mexico) – a naturally flavored vanilla soda

=== Oceania ===
==== Australia ====
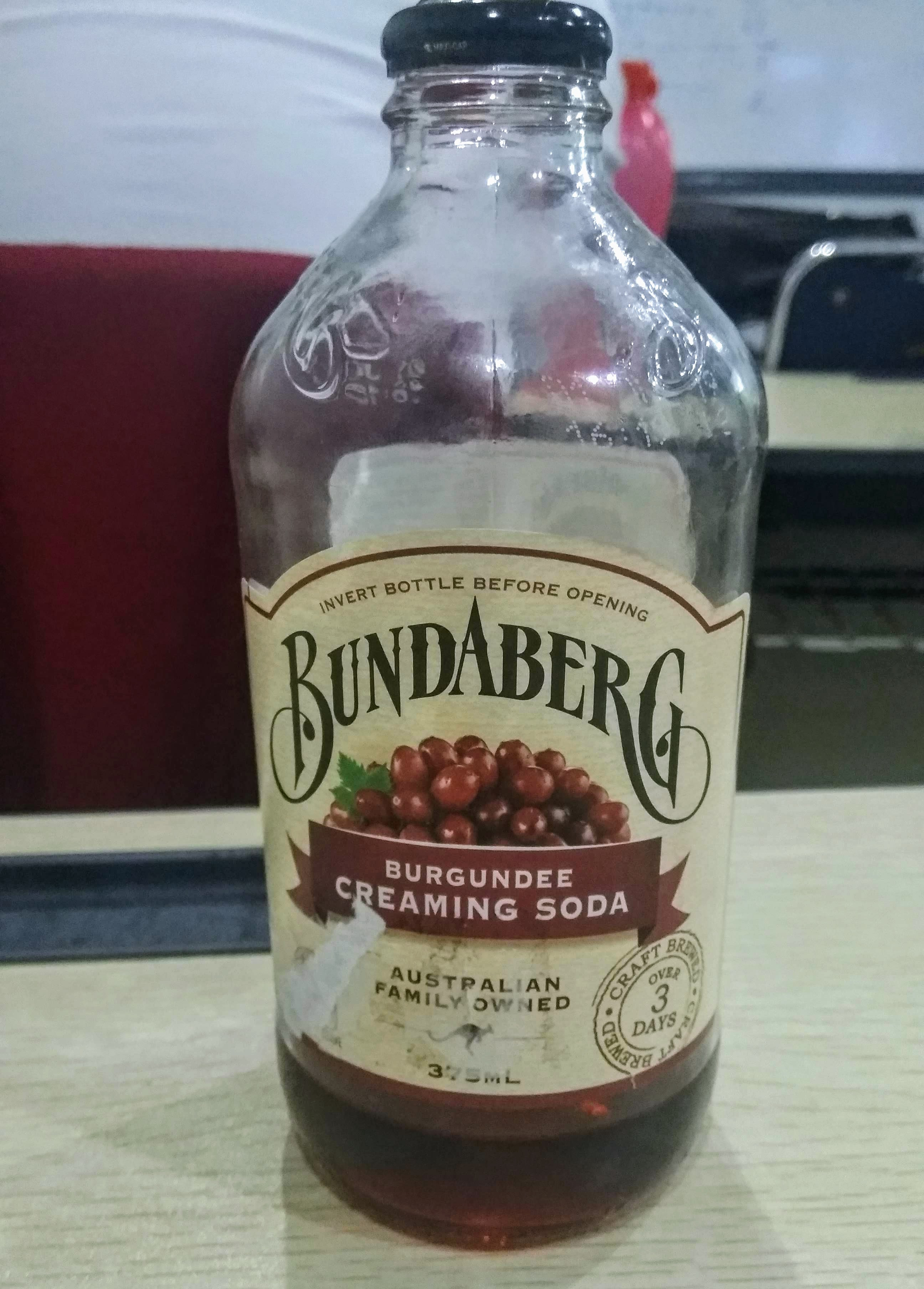
Bundaberg Burgundee Creaming Soda

In Australia, two distinctly different coloured sodas exist, red and brown, both usually called creaming soda, although some brands such as Bickford's, use the term creamy soda. Almost all varieties are predominantly vanilla based, but red or pink varieties introduce raspberry flavoring. Another local variant produced by Golden Circle is vanilla and fruit-flavored, and coloured yellow to distinguish it from existing brands. More traditional brown varieties are also available, but less common. Brands include Kirks' Sno Drop (only available in South Australia, Victoria, and the Northern Territory), Tarax, River Port, Hartz, Saxby's, Bert's Snowette (the original recipe of Shelley's Snowcap (Snowcap Champagne) before the line was acquired) and Schweppes, which also produce a red variety as part of its "Traditionals" range.

Bundaberg Burgundee creaming soda is based on red grapes and is alternately made by other producers under the name portello.

The term "creaming soda" is used to refer to the drink itself, whereas the combination of soda and ice-cream is called a spider.

==== New Zealand ====
This is known as creaming soda, ice cream soda, chill drink, or cream soda, though the flavor changes are negligible. It is usually a bright yellow colour or a white opaque. It is one of the many flavors sold by Foxton Fizz. It is also one of the many carbonated drink-flavors offered by Golden Circle.

=== Europe ===
==== Netherlands ====
A brand called UGGO is sold in the Netherlands, which offers several different flavors of cream soda. The Surinamese soft drink brand Fernandes, widely available in the country, sells cream soda under the name Green Punch; as the name implies, it is green in color.

Asian (especially Chinese) supermarkets also sell Schweppes Cream Soda, which is imported from Hong Kong. A&W is sold in some supermarkets.

Old Jamaica Cream Soda (Jamaica) is also sold in the Netherlands.

==== Ireland ====
Ireland has a brand of clear vanilla-flavored cream soda called Country Spring.. Country Spring was a soft drink brand made by the Gleeson Group, a company which was in turn purchased by C&C Group in 2012 . Cream Soda made by A.G. Barr is also widely sold and consumed there.

==== United Kingdom ====
In the UK, A.G. Barr (the Scottish company that makes IRN BRU) and Ben Shaw's (a Cott brand), manufacture their own brands of cream soda, which are both clear and vanilla-flavoured. Some supermarket chains sell Cream Soda under their respective own brands. Pepsi has also introduced a cream soda flavoured drink.

==== Finland ====
A brand called Sun'n Cream Soda is made by Finnish brewery Nokian Panimo. They also have a variation called Orange Cream Soda, with a hint of orange taste.

=== Asia ===
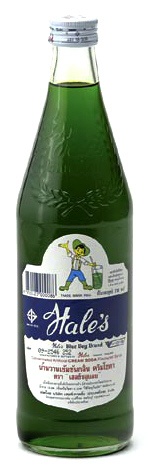
Hale's Blue Boy Cream Soda Syrup

In Hong Kong, the Swire Coca-Cola Company markets a yellow Schweppes Cream Soda. Some people enjoy cream soda in a 1:1 ratio with fresh milk.

In Japan, "cream soda" (クリームソーダ) is a term used for an ice cream float topped with a scoop of vanilla ice cream, commonly flavored with green melon-flavored soda (メロンソーダ).

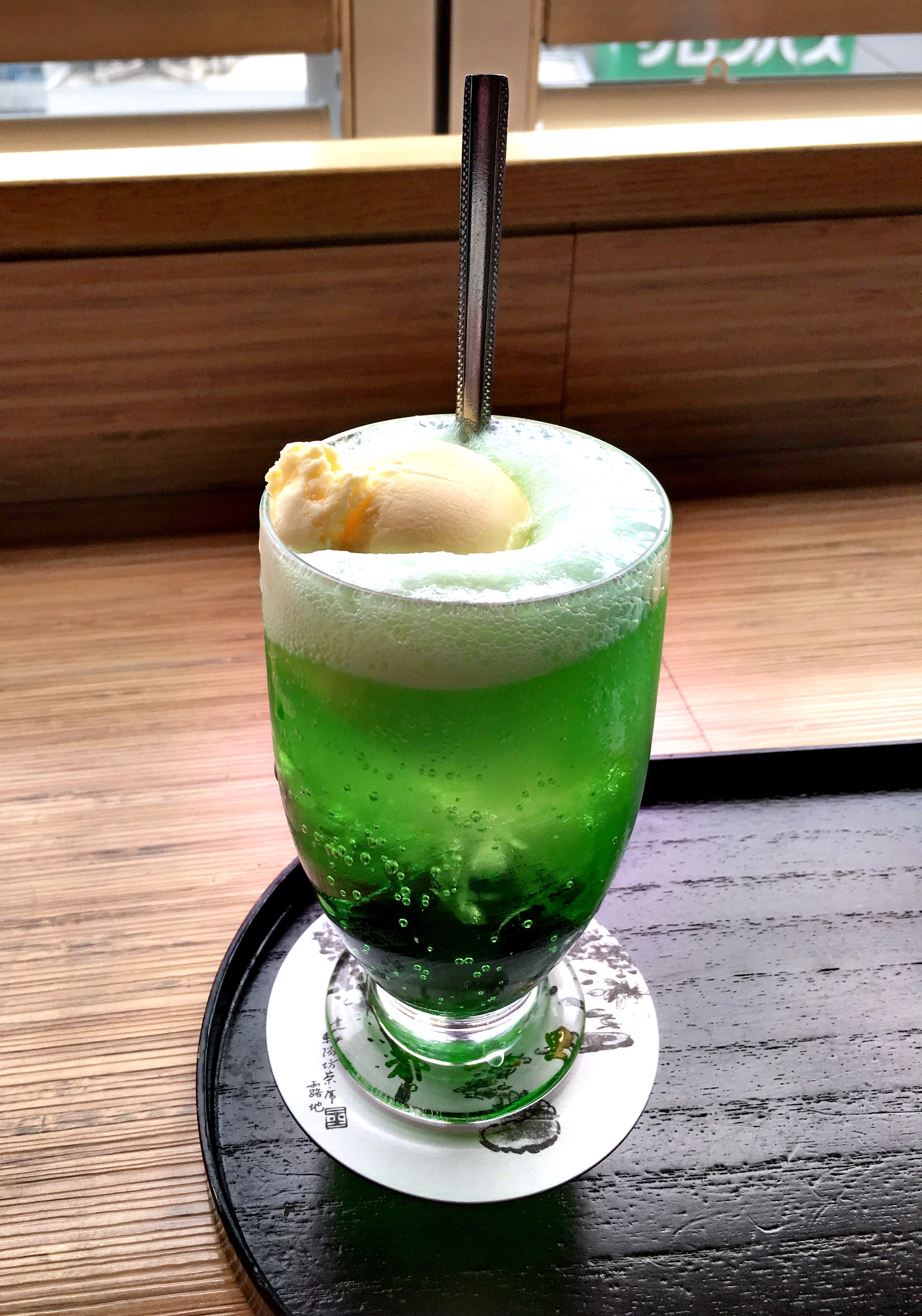
Japanese style cream soda

In Malaysia, the F&N or Fraser and Neave brand makes a clear ice cream soda that sold in a blue packaging.

A popular brand in Pakistan is Pakola Ice Cream Soda, which is green in color.

In Sri Lanka, Elephant House Cream Soda is the most popular soft drink. Coca-Cola Beverages Sri Lanka launched their newest flavor, Fanta Cream Soda, in July 2009.

In Thailand, Hale's Trading produces Hale's Blue Boy Brand Cream Soda Flavoured Syrup, a green colored, rose/floral flavored cordial. This is mixed 1 part water to 4 parts soda water to get a cream soda drink, very similar to the South African Creme Soda, or can be used as a flavoring in shaved-ice desserts. This syrup is sold worldwide in some Asian food stores. PepsiCo's division in Thailand produces a green, cream-flavored soda under their brand name Mirinda.

In some Arabian countries, Canada Dry offers a cream soda flavor.

=== Africa ===
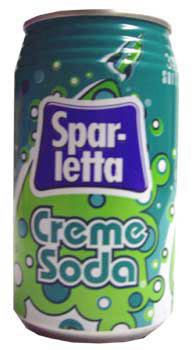
Sparletta Creme Soda

In Mayotte, Comoros, South Africa, Eswatini, and Zimbabwe, cream soda is sold under the label Sparletta Creme Soda, a product of the Coca-Cola company. It is green in color.

== See also ==
- Ice cream float
- Vanilla Coke
- Root beer
- List of brand name soft drinks products
- List of soft drink flavors
