= Rip It =

Energy drink

- Type: Energy drink
- Manufacturer: National Beverage Corp.
- Origin: United States
- Introduced: 2004
- Variants: 3-Way; A’tomic Pom; Can’D Man; Citrus X; Citrus X (0 calorie); Code Blue; CYP-X; F-Bomb; F-Bomb (0 calorie); G-Force; G-Force (0 calorie); Le-MOAN’R; Lime Wrecker; Power; Power (0 calorie); Red Zone; Sting-Er-Mo; Tribute
- Website: www.ripitenergy.com

Rip It is an American brand of energy drink that is produced and distributed by National Beverage Corp., maker of Shasta, Faygo, and La Croix. It was introduced in 2004 and is National Beverage Corp.'s first energy drink.

Marketed as "energy fuel at a price you can swallow," Rip It drinks have been referred to as a "bare-budget option", often costing $1 per can in the United States. They have been supplied to US military personnel serving in Afghanistan and Iraq and have gained popularity there.

== Flavors and ingredients ==
The drinks come in a variety of flavors, 13 different ones as of 2020. There are sugar-free versions of some flavors and 2 fl oz shots. Some flavors are available in both 16 and 8 fl oz cans.

The drink contains 160% of a person's daily value of vitamin C, 240% of the daily value of vitamin B_{6}, and 830% of the daily value of vitamin B_{12} per 16 fl oz serving, according to 2020 product packaging. It contains taurine, caffeine, inositol, and guarana seed extract. Sugar-free versions contain sucralose and acesulfame potassium.

Rip It drinks average about 160 mg of caffeine per 16 fl oz can. The Le-MOAN’R flavor contains 204 mg of caffeine. The 2 fl oz shot versions contain about 100 mg of caffeine, with some flavors containing as much as 135 mg.

== Sponsoring ==
In 2020, the brand sponsored the 100Talk Podcast, aimed at fans of the 100 Thieves esports organization. They previously sponsored Olympic champion alpine skier Julia Mancuso in 2010 and the No. 16 car in the Automobile Racing Club of America driven by Joey Coulter in 2012.

=== Support of U.S. military ===
The drink, before the departure from the Middle East, was widely consumed by U.S. forces in Afghanistan and Iraq. In a 2016 interview, an Army staff sergeant noted that "over three-quarters of military personnel are drinking this stuff on the regular". The brand highlights its support for the United States military in its marketing.
