= Jill Milan =

American fashion brand

- Company type: Private Company
- Founded: 2011
- Headquarters: Redwood City, California, United States
- Key people: Jill Fraser, Founder and CEO
- Products: Apparel, Accessories
- Website: JillMilan.com

Jill Milan is an American fashion brand that specializes in animal-friendly fashion accessories, the majority of which are produced in Italy. The brand has been carried to red carpet events by a number of high-profile Hollywood celebrities.

== History ==
Founder Jill Fraser, who has been vegan for decades and does not wear any clothing made with animal-derived materials such as leather, fur, wool and silk, conceived the company when she was unable to find luxury-quality handbags that were not made of animal-derived materials.

Fraser's prior experience includes serving as Chief Marketing Officer for a venture-backed online ad network serving the luxury space. She also founded and served as President of soft drink company Virgil's Root Beer. Fraser holds bachelor's and master's degrees from the University of Oxford and is a member of Mensa International. She founded Jill Milan with partner Milan Lazich, who had been part of management teams which took two Silicon Valley software companies public via IPOs on Nasdaq, most recently as a vice president at Magma Design Automation.

== Products ==
Jill Milan launched the brand in 2011 with a line of handbags. Items include:

- Art Deco Clutch, a stainless steel bag carried by celebrities including Anne Hathaway, Jennifer Lawrence and Eva Longoria.
- 450 Sutter, a cylindrical stainless steel clutch. It was carried by Downton Abbey actress Joanne Froggatt to a Golden Globe party.

In August 2015, the company announced it would introduce a line of vegan coats and jackets designed in collaboration with celebrity stylist Laura Spinella.

== Celebrities ==
The brand has been carried to red carpet events by a number of high-profile Hollywood celebrities. Actresses who have carried Jill Milan bags include:

- Anne Hathaway: The Academy Award winner has carried Jill Milan to a number of premieres and other events, including Les Miserables premieres.
- Rashida Jones: The Office actress carried Jill Milan to the Golden Globe Awards.
- Jennifer Lawrence: Academy Award winner carried Jill Milan to multiple events, including the 13th Annual AFI Awards Luncheon.
- Eva Longoria: Carried Jill Milan to multiple events, including the Desperate Housewives closing party.
- Hailee Steinfeld: The Academy Award-nominated actress carried Jill Milan to multiple events, including the MTV Video Music Awards.
- Kerry Washington: The star of television's Scandal carried Jill Milan to the premiere of her film Django Unchained.

== In fashion media ==
W Magazine’s "Most Wanted" feature has included Jill Milan's Art Deco Clutch, Holland Park Clutch, and Octagon Clutch.

The Zoe Report profiled Jill Milan's Newbury Street Portfolio, calling it "Ready to go from the office to cocktail hour in the city."

== In popular media ==
On the television show Gossip Girl, Elizabeth Hurley’s Diana Payne character carried Jill Milan bags in multiple episodes in Season 5.

Jill Fraser is often interviewed on fashion, especially vegan fashion, including a discussion on The Marilu Henner Show with Marilu Henner.

== Philanthropy ==
The company's support of non-profit organizations that work on behalf of animal welfare includes sponsorship of the Genesis Awards, a production of The Humane Society of the United States to honor members of the media and entertainment industries for works promoting animal welfare. Jill Milan also dedicates a portion of sales from certain products to Southern California Thoroughbred Rescue, an all-volunteer charity which rescues thoroughbred horses from slaughter, neglect and abuse.
