= Charlotte Parker =

Charlotte Parker (née Charlotte Adler, née Charlotte Faye Greenberg) (born in Vienna, Austria) is the co-founder of Parker Communications, a media company that includes Parker Public Relations. She has guided the public images of over 200 celebrities, politicians, executives and corporations. As an expert media analyst and image consultant Parker has appeared on CNN, MSNBC, Court TV, and the E-Channel and been written about in Spy Magazine, The Columbia Journalism Review,^{[1]} People and The Los Angeles Times Magazine.

== Early life ==
The daughter of Holocaust survivors Herman and Sara Adler, Parker was raised in Cleveland, Ohio. She graduated from New York City's Stern College for Women and attended graduate school at Hebrew University in Jerusalem and CCNY, where she studied English Literature, creative writing and poetry.

== Career ==
After graduating college Parker worked for Penthouse Magazine as assistant to the production director, John Evans. While there she came up with the idea of a magazine about marijuana and its lifestyle, and started working on it at night. This morphed into the popular counterculture publication Head Magazine, for which she was the editor and publisher, as Charlotte Faye Greenberg, for four years. During that time the magazine became known for its articles, photography and interviews with important figures including Timothy Leary and Peter Tosh. As Charlotte Faye Greenberg, she served on the advisory board of The National Organization for the Reform of Marijuana Laws (NORML), and was a guest of honor at the 1977 International Hallucinogenic Mushroom Conference along with R. Gordon Wasson and Albert Hofmann. The New York Times quoted her in 1976 as saying that marijuana use was “one of the fastest growing recreational activities in the country."

In 1980 Parker moved to Los Angeles and was appointed Director of Public Relations for the Academy of Television Arts and Sciences. From there she worked for Lee Solters at Solters, Roskin, Friedman Public Relations where she was the publicist for television programs including the ABC comedy sketch series, Fridays, which launched the careers of Larry David, Michael Richards, and Melanie Chartoff among others. She then went to Rogers & Cowan Public Relations, where she worked with Warren Cowan, Dale Olson and Ronni Chasen in the film division.

In 1985 Parker started her own public relations agency, Parker Public Relations. She may be best known for her work with Arnold Schwarzenegger, whom she personally represented for 14 years, beginning with Conan the Destroyer (Parker also represented the film). In the Schwarzenegger biography Fantastic, author Laurence Leamer called her "a key player in his rise to stardom."

Parker launched the publicity campaigns of director James Cameron and producer Gale Anne Hurd. She represented director John Frankenheimer, producers John Davis, and Arnold Kopelson, Jesse Ventura, Shannon Lee, the Audrey Hepburn Children's Fund, World Wrestling Federation, World Championship Wrestling and the films The Terminator, Aliens, Total Recall, and the animated film The Swan Princess, among others. She was a key figure in the corporate launch of Planet Hollywood and created the launch campaign for Original New York Seltzer. Among those she represented is fitness legend Joe Weider and actress-turned-director Sondra Locke. She also served on the board of the Bruce Lee Foundation.

Parker co-created the E-Channel original film Murder at the Cannes Film Festival and was Executive Producer of the entertainment television news program The Industry News and Marketplace

In 1999, Parker hosted her own radio show on Los Angeles station KRLA, called Get What You Want with Charlotte Parker.

== Personal life ==
Parker is married to Joel Parker, who is her partner at Parker Communications, They have a daughter, Ruth Parker, and reside in Encino, California.
