= Virgil's =

Virgil's can refer to:

- Virgil's Root Beer, an American root beer
- Anything relating to the Roman poet Publius Vergilius Maro, better known as Virgil
- Virgil's Aeneid, a Latin epic poem, written by Virgil between 29 and 19 BC
- Virgil's tomb, a Roman burial vault in Naples, said to be the tomb of the poet Virgil
- Virgil's Tomb (Joseph Wright paintings) (1779–1785), the title of at least three paintings completed by Joseph Wright of Derby

== See also ==
- St Virgil's College, an Australian school
