= A-Treat Bottling Company =

American beverage company

- Company type: Private
- Industry: Beverage
- Founded: 1918
- Headquarters: Allentown, Pennsylvania, U.S.
- Area served: Northeastern United States
- Products: Carbonated soft drinks
- Revenue: ▲$10 million (1998)
- Website: www.a-treat.com

The A-Treat Bottling Company was a beverage company headquartered in Allentown, Pennsylvania, that manufactured and bottled the A-Treat brand of carbonated soft drinks. A-Treat stopped production on January 23, 2015, but the brand was purchased by Jaindl Companies and production resumed.

== History ==
=== 20th century ===
A-Treat was founded by the Munjones. Their father, James J. Munjone, (June 1, 1887 - Jul 4, 1936 Naples, Italy) started a beverage business in the family home in the 600 block of Front Street in Allentown, Pennsylvania, and later built a small manufacturing facility behind the home. When James died ownership was given to his sister, Vincenza Munjone who was married to Gioacchino Egizio. The Egizio family took over the business from the Munjone's and the details of how that transaction occurred are not documented.

In 1932, the Egizio brothers moved the business to Union Boulevard in East Allentown, where it remains to this day. Joseph C. Egizio served as the board chairman of A-Treat Bottling Co. until retiring in 1989. He died in 2000, at the age of 96. John L. Egizio, who had started working at the company at the age of 13 delivering sodas on his bicycle, served as vice president and co-owner until his death in 1990.

In 1991, the company was the subject of regional news coverage when a smear campaign was launched against A-Treat as it tried to sell its sodas in New York City. The campaign, which targeted African Americans, claimed certain brands of carbonated beverages, including those produced by A-Treat, were actually manufactured by the Ku Klux Klan and contained stimulants that would "sterilize the black man". Investigations by the U.S. Food and Drug Administration and the New York City Department of Health found the claims to be unsubstantiated and untrue.

=== 21st century ===
On July 21, 2015, it was announced that the Jaindl Companies had purchased the A-Treat brand, including its name, trademarks, formulas, and related intellectual property. A co-packing agreement was reached with The Coca-Cola Company that keeps production in the Lehigh Valley, with production scheduled to resume in August 2015. A poll was held on July 27, 2015, to decide the first flavors A-Treat would release onto store shelves. With an unexpected victory, Orange Cream placed first with 17% of the votes, which was later revealed that the poll was manipulated by a single person using multi-login on Google Chrome to cast over 10,000 votes. Black Cherry placed second with 8% of votes, and production of the two flavors was immediately started alongside the eight previously announced flavors: Birch Beer, Cream, Big Blue, Ginger Ale, Sarsaparilla, Orange, Root Beer, Grapefruit, and Diet Cream. A-Treat Grapefruit, another flavor with a devoted following, was the first soda to roll off the line when A-Treat made its return in 2015.

On May 20, 2016, A-Treat launched Orange Cream, its first new flavor in over six years.

== Products ==
The company formerly distinguished itself by producing sodas in the traditional manner (e.g., using essential oils and cane sugar, rather than extracts and high fructose corn syrup). As of the final production, the company used both cane sugar syrup and high fructose corn syrup. A-Treat produced soft drinks in at least 16 flavors, including Big Blue (blue raspberry), Birch Beer, Black Cherry, Champagne Kola, Cola, Cream soda, Fruit Punch, two kinds of Ginger Ale (Pale Dry and Golden, formerly Peppery Golden), Grape, Grapefruit, White Birch Beer, Pineapple, Sarsaparilla, two kinds of Orange (regular and Orange Dry), Lime (formerly Tom Collins Mixer), Tonic Water (formerly Quinine Water), Strawberry, Treat-up, and Root Beer. Most, if not all, of these flavors were also produced in a diet formulation. A-Treat Birch Beer and Sarsaparilla are rated highly by connoisseurs of these types of beverages.

== Distribution ==
A-Treat beverages are distributed in Pennsylvania, Maryland, New Jersey, Virginia, West Virginia, Delaware, and Bermuda.
