= ToniCol =

Mexican vanilla soft drink

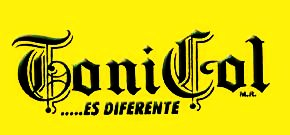
ToniCol logo.

ToniCol is a naturally flavoured vanilla soft drink manufactured in Mexico. It is most popular in the state of Sinaloa, Mexico, especially in the city of Mazatlán, though it can be found typically in the western states, such as Jalisco and Baja California.

== Name ==
The name ToniCol comes from the man who invented its formula: Antonio Espinosa de los Montero from Rosario, Sinaloa, around 1870. It is a blend of the shortened form of his first name "Toni" and the drink "Cola", even though ToniCol is not strictly speaking a cola but is actually a cream soda due to its vanilla flavour. The name of the soft drink is most often spelled ToniCol, although in the past several ways were used, and older bottles and/or publications may include any of the following: "Toni Col", "Toni-Col", and "Tonicol".

The soda's slogan is "ToniCol .....es diferente" (which translates to "ToniCol .....is different"), although the slogan provided on bilingual bottles is "ToniCol .....it's different!". The website slogan has instead "se diferente" at the end which drastically changes the slogan to "be different." Previous slogans include "ToniCol..... el refresco diferente" ("ToniCol... the different soft drink").

== Production ==
ToniCol is bottled in Rosario, Sinaloa, by El Manantial S.A. de C.V., also known as "El Rosario." It is one of the few independent bottlers in Mexico today.

== Ingredients ==
The soft drink's recipe calls for almost all-natural ingredients, including "concentrated natural vanilla extract", citric acid, sodium benzoate as well as sugar rather than corn syrup.

ToniCol has now also released a "diet" formulation which contains Splenda (sucralose) in lieu of natural sugar.

== See also ==
- Cream soda
