= Portello (soft drink) =

Variety of soft drink

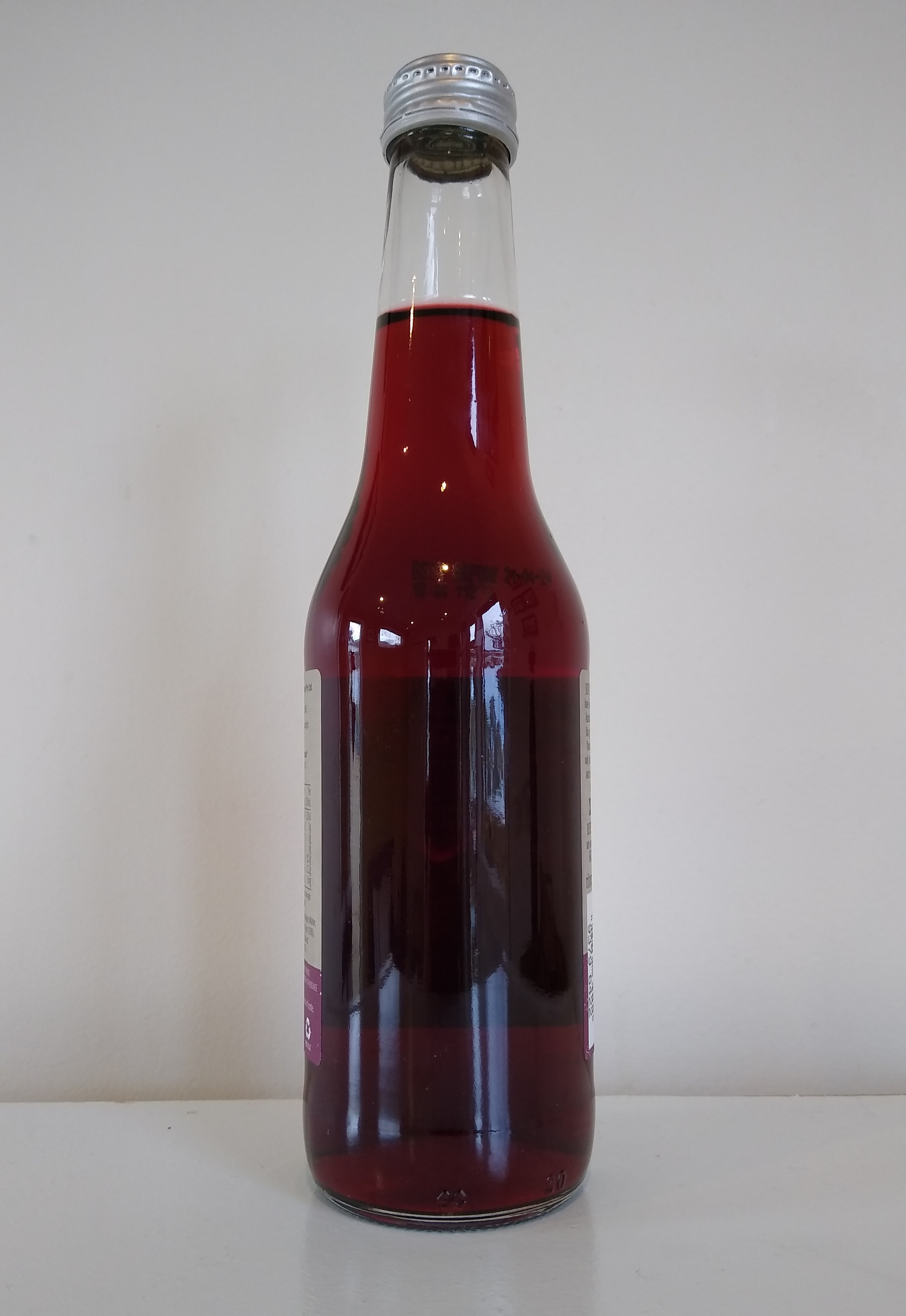
A bottle of River Port portello

Portello (also known as Portino and Ruby Mello), is a carbonated grape and berry flavoured soft drink. It is believed to have originated in London, England in the 18th century, before spreading to colonies of the British Empire.

== History ==
Portello is currently used in Sri Lanka as the name of a grape soda produced under the Fanta label by Coca-Cola Sri Lanka Private Ltd.

== See also ==
- Cream soda
