= Rock and Rye =

Alcoholic beverage and cocktail

Rock and Rye is a term (both generically and brand names) for a bottled liqueur or mixed cocktail composed of rye whiskey and rock candy (crystallized sugar) or fruit.

As early as 1914, United States government publications discuss disputes regarding beverages labeled "rock and rye", including a case of a beverage so marketed which was found by the Bureau of Chemistry to consist of "water, sugar, glucose, and artificial coloring matters, sold in imitation of a rock and rye cordial".

Among non-alcoholic beverages, Rock and Rye continues to be a popular flavor of the Faygo brand of soda pop.

Related products mentioned in the early 20th century include Rock and Rum and Rock and Gin.

Slow & Low, produced by Hochstadter's of Scobeyville, New Jersey since 1884, is an 84 proof Rock & Rye drink that according to the label is "served straight and as a proper old-fashioned since the 1800s. Rock and Rye Union Made with Straight rye Whiskey Raw Honey, Navel Orange, Rock Candy and Bitters."

== In media ==
In the film National Lampoon's Animal House, Boon (Peter Riegert) orders a "double Rock and Rye and seven Carlings" at a bar.

The song "Mississippi Half Step Uptown Toodeloo" by The Grateful Dead, lyrics by Robert Hunter, references Rock and Rye in the lyrics. “Half a cup of rock and rye /Farewell to you old southern sky / I'm on my way”

Rock and Rye has long been supposed to be a cure for various types of cold and flu. Damon Runyon mentions the belief in one of his tales of Prohibition New York, “The Three Wise Guys”:

...I step into Good Time Charley's on the afternoon in question, I am feeling as if maybe I have a touch of grippe coming on, and Good Time Charley tells me that there is nothing in this world as good for a touch of grippe as rock candy and rye whisky, as it assassinates the germs at once.

It seems that Good Time Charley always keeps a stock of rock candy and rye whisky on hand for touches of the grippe, and he gives me a few doses immediately, and in fact Charley takes a few doses with me, as he says there is no telling but what I am scattering germs of my touch of the grippe all around the joint, and he must safeguard his health.”

In the 1974 film The Front Page, set in 1928, Chicago newspaper reporter Hildy Johnson (played by Jack Lemmon) shows up in The Press Room of the Criminal Courts Building in Chicago with multiple bottles of liquor the day he resigns/the evening before he is set to get married and move to Philadelphia, to share with his fellow journalists. His replacement, Rudy Keppler (played by Jon Korkes) is asked to join them and responds by requesting, "Rock and Rye please."
