= Hale's Blue Boy =

Thai flavoured syrup brand

Hale's Blue Boy (Thai: เฮลซ์บลูบอย, pronounced [hēːw blūː bɔ̄ːj, hēːɫ-]) is a brand of flavoured syrup from Thailand, produced by Hale's Trading (Thailand) Co., Ltd. Established in 1959, the family-run business grew to become the leading syrup brand in Thailand, and is exported to several international markets. Its products—especially the red-coloured salak flavour—are used in a large variety of popular drinks and desserts.

== History ==
Hale's Blue Boy's syrup business was founded in 1959 by four siblings of the Sino-Thai Pattana-anek family, who had previously owned small grocery stores. It became a success from early on, and gradually expanded. In 1978, Hale's Trading was registered as a company, and moved into newer production facilities at Bangchan Industrial Estate in eastern Bangkok's Min Buri District.

The company has only produced two products: flavoured syrup—for which it has become a well known household name—and sugar cubes. The company remains family-owned (as of the 2010s it is managed by the family's second generation) and has been described by one of its executives as very conservative, opting to stick to its established product with its steady stream of income rather than diversifying into more risky ventures. Its logo and the 710-ml glass bottles its products are sold in remain unchanged from the 1980s.

Hale's Trading has few competitors, as the consumer syrup market yields relatively low unit margins, making it an unattractive investment to newcomers. The company has steadily grown along with the expansion of the retail market, especially following the rapid growth of supermarkets and hypermarkets in the 2000s and early 2010s. In 2015, it began exporting to the United States, Europe, Australia and New Zealand (targeting Asian communities), and expanded to ASEAN, China and India in the following years. As of 2019, the company reported a revenue of 3.769 billion baht (US$120 M), and a profit of ฿1.099 bn ($35 M), respective increases of 30 and 47 percent over the previous year.

== Products ==
Hale's Blue Boy's main product is concentrated flavoured syrup, which comes in nine flavours, the best known of which are salak (red-coloured), cream soda (green), and jasmine. The other flavours are pineapple, grape, strawberry, cantaloupe, sarsaparilla and rose.

The syrup is used to make a large variety of drinks and desserts, including flavoured sodas, nom yen (sweetened cold milk), and shaved ice. Hospitals in Thailand also use it to manage hypoglycaemia in diabetic patients.
