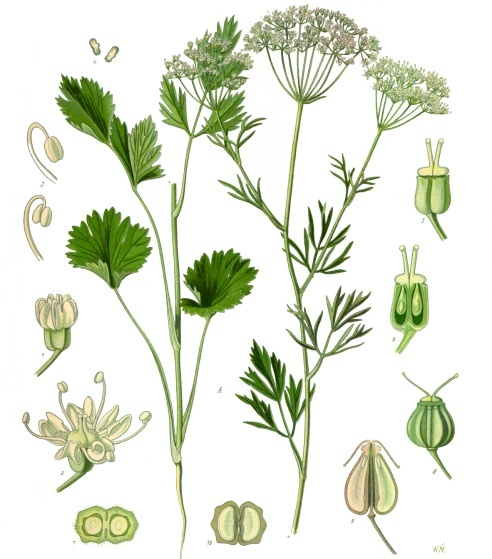
- 1897 illustration

Scientific classification
- Kingdom: Plantae
- Clade: Tracheophytes
- Clade: Angiosperms
- Clade: Eudicots
- Clade: Asterids
- Order: Apiales
- Family: Apiaceae
- Genus: Pimpinella
- Species: P. anisum

Binomial name
- Pimpinella anisum L.

Synonyms
- Synonymy: Anisum odoratum Raf.; Anisum officinale DC.; Anisum officinarum Moench; Anisum vulgare Gaertn.; Apium anisum (L.) Crantz; Carum anisum (L.) Baill.; Pimpinele anisa St.-Lag.; Ptychotis vargasiana DC.; Selinum anisum (L.) E.H.L. Krause; Seseli gilliesii Hook. & Arn.; Sison anisum (L.) Spreng.; Tragium anisum (L.) Link

= Anise =

Species of flowering plant

Anise (/ˈænɪs/; Pimpinella anisum), also called aniseed or rarely anix, is a flowering plant in the family Apiaceae native to the Eastern Mediterranean and Southwest Asia.

The flavor and aroma of its seeds have similarities with some other spices and herbs, such as star anise, fennel, liquorice, and tarragon. It is widely cultivated and used to flavor food, candy, and alcoholic drinks, especially around the Mediterranean.

== Etymology ==
The name "anise" is derived via Old French from the Latin words anīsum or anēthum from Greek ἄνηθον ánēthon referring to dill.

An obsolete English word for anise is anet, also coming from ănēthum.

== Botany ==
Anise is a herbaceous annual plant growing to 60–90 centimetres (2–3 feet) or more. The leaves at the base of the plant are simple, 1–5 cm (3/8–2 inches) long and shallowly lobed, while leaves higher on the stems are feathery or lacy, pinnate, divided into numerous small leaflets.

Both leaves and flowers are produced in large, loose clusters. The flowers are either white or yellow, approximately 3 millimetres (1/8 in) in diameter, produced in dense umbels.

The fruit is a dry oblong and curved schizocarp, 4–6 mm (1/6–1/4 in) long, usually called "aniseed".

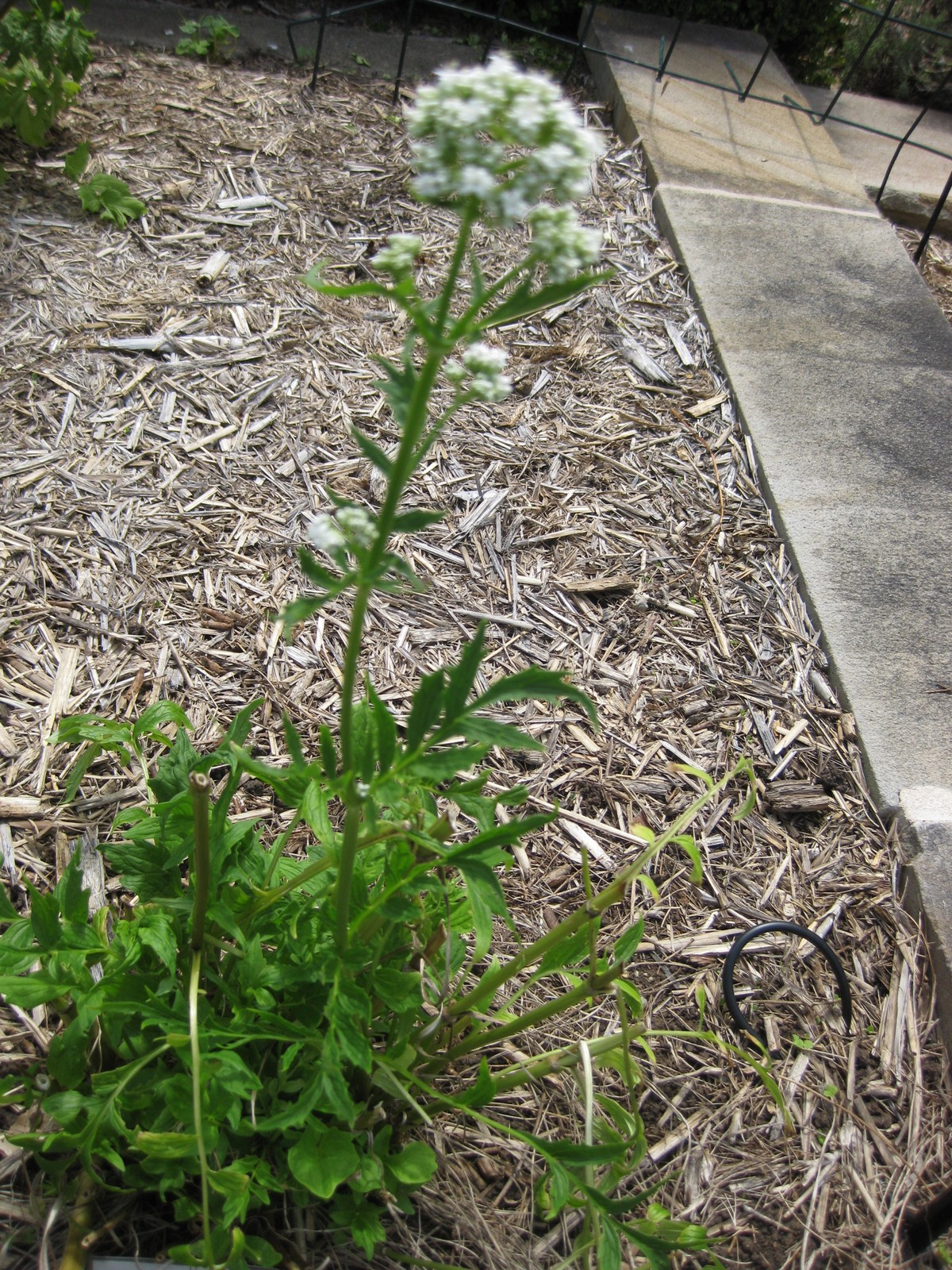
Royal Botanic Garden, Sydney

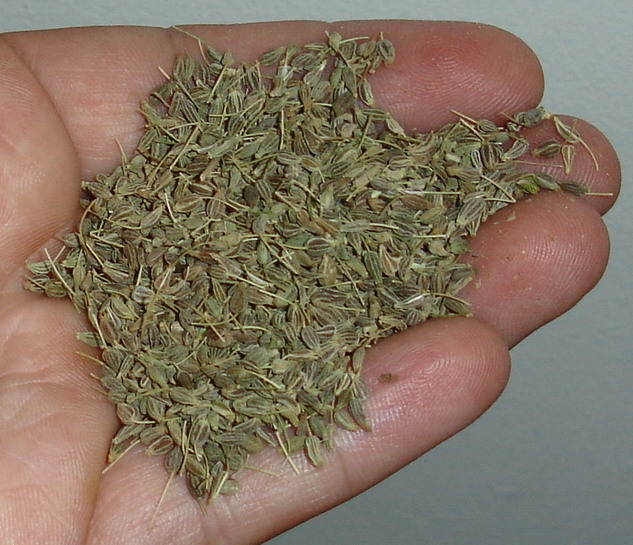
Fruits in hand for scale

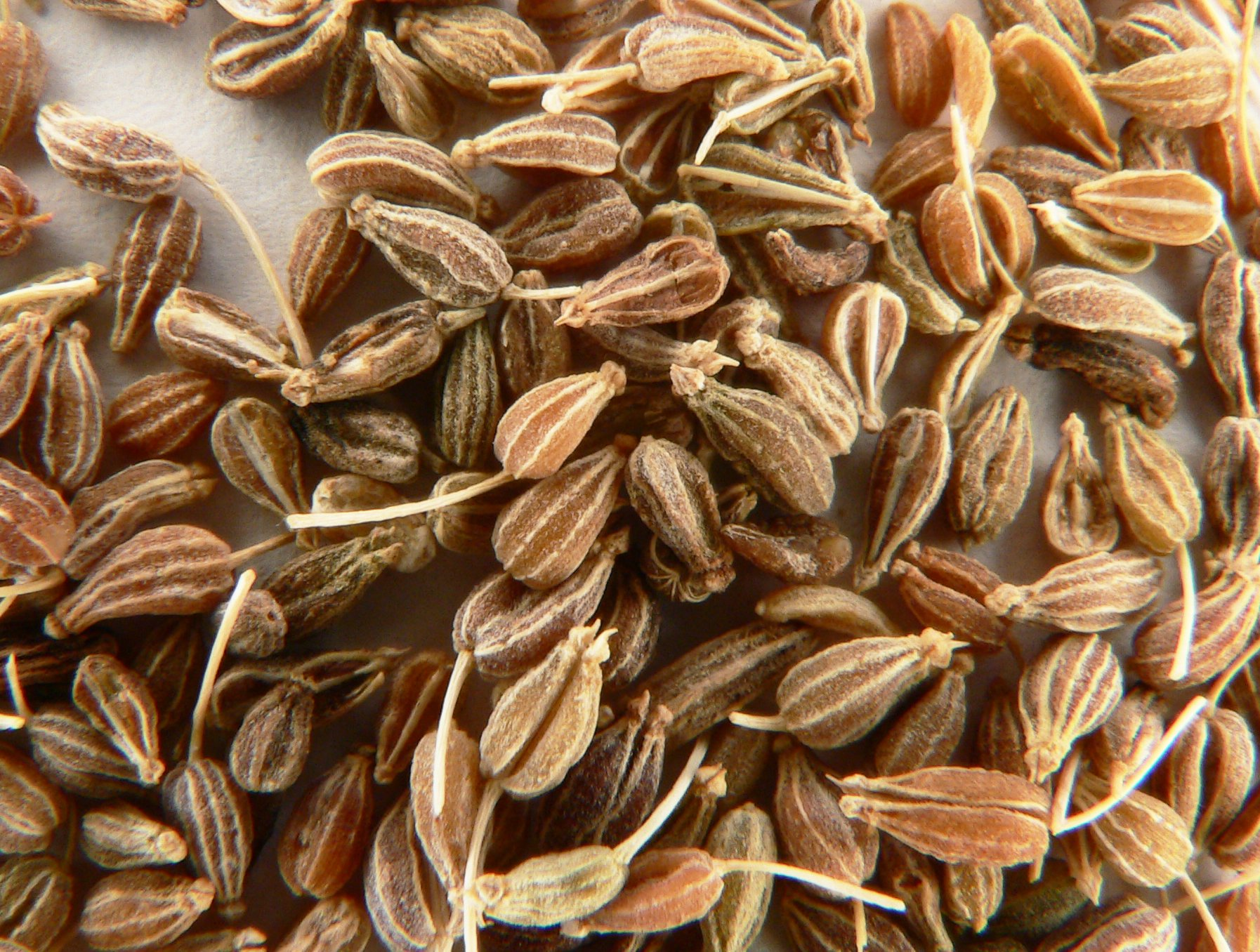
Fruits (aniseed)

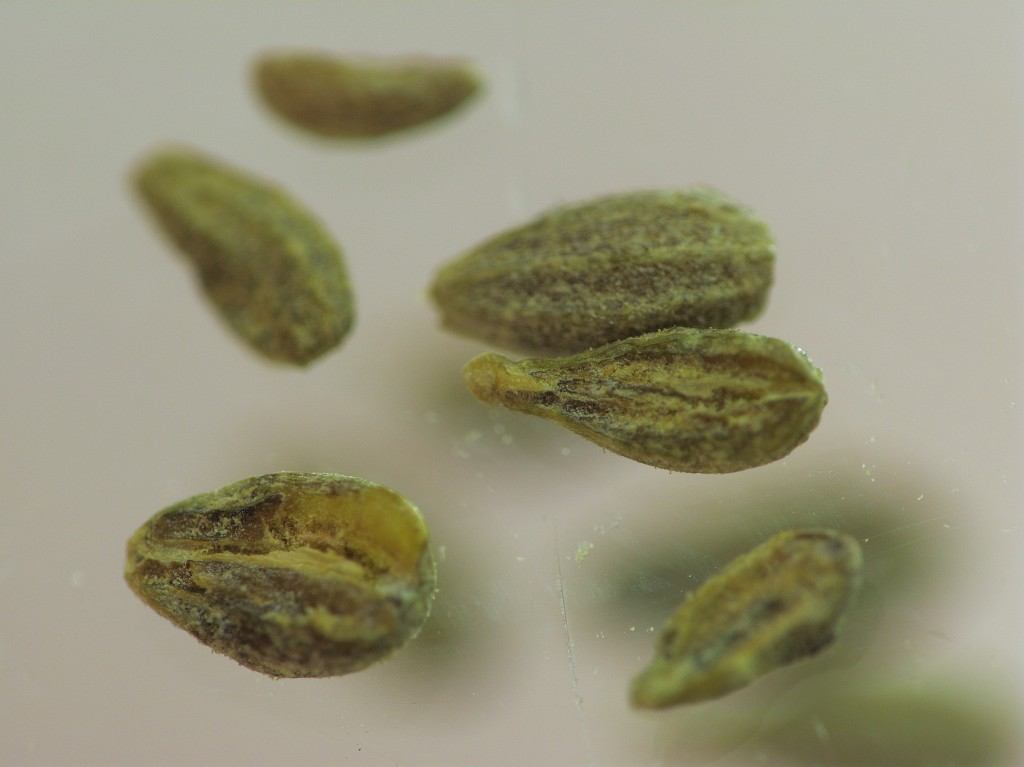
Close-up of fruits

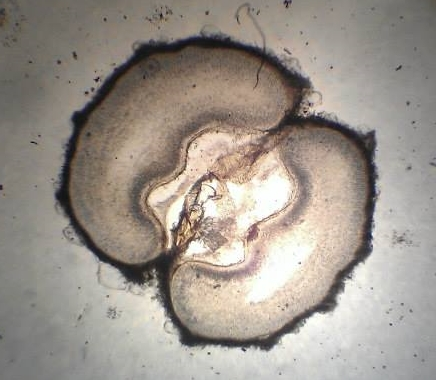
Microscope cross-section of fruit

== Ecology ==
Anise is a food plant for the larvae of some Lepidoptera species (butterflies and moths), including the lime-speck pug and wormwood pug.

== Cultivation ==
Anise was first cultivated in the Middle East, and was brought to Europe for its medicinal value. It has been cultivated in Egypt for approximately 4,000 years.

Anise plants grow best in light, fertile, well-drained soil. The seeds should be planted as soon as the ground warms up in spring. Because the plants have a taproot, they do not transplant well after being established so they should either be started in their final location or be transplanted while the seedlings are still small.

=== Production ===
Western cuisines have long used anise to flavor dishes, drinks, and candies. The word is used for both the species of herb and its licorice-like flavor. The most powerful flavor component of the essential oil of anise, anethole, is found in both anise and an unrelated spice indigenous to South China called star anise (Illicium verum) widely used in South Asian, Southeast Asian and East Asian dishes. Star anise is considerably less expensive to produce and has gradually displaced P. anisum in Western markets. While formerly produced in larger quantities, by 1999 world production of the essential oil of anise was 8 tons, compared to 400 tons of star anise.

== Uses ==
=== Composition ===
As with all spices, the composition of anise varies considerably with origin and cultivation method. These are typical values for the main constituents.

Moisture: 9–13%
Protein: 18%
Fatty oil: 8–23%
Essential oil: 2–7%
Starch: 5%
N-free extract: 22–28%
Crude fibre: 12–25%

In particular, the anise seeds products should also contain more than 0.2 milliliter volatile oil per 100 grams of spice.

=== Culinary ===
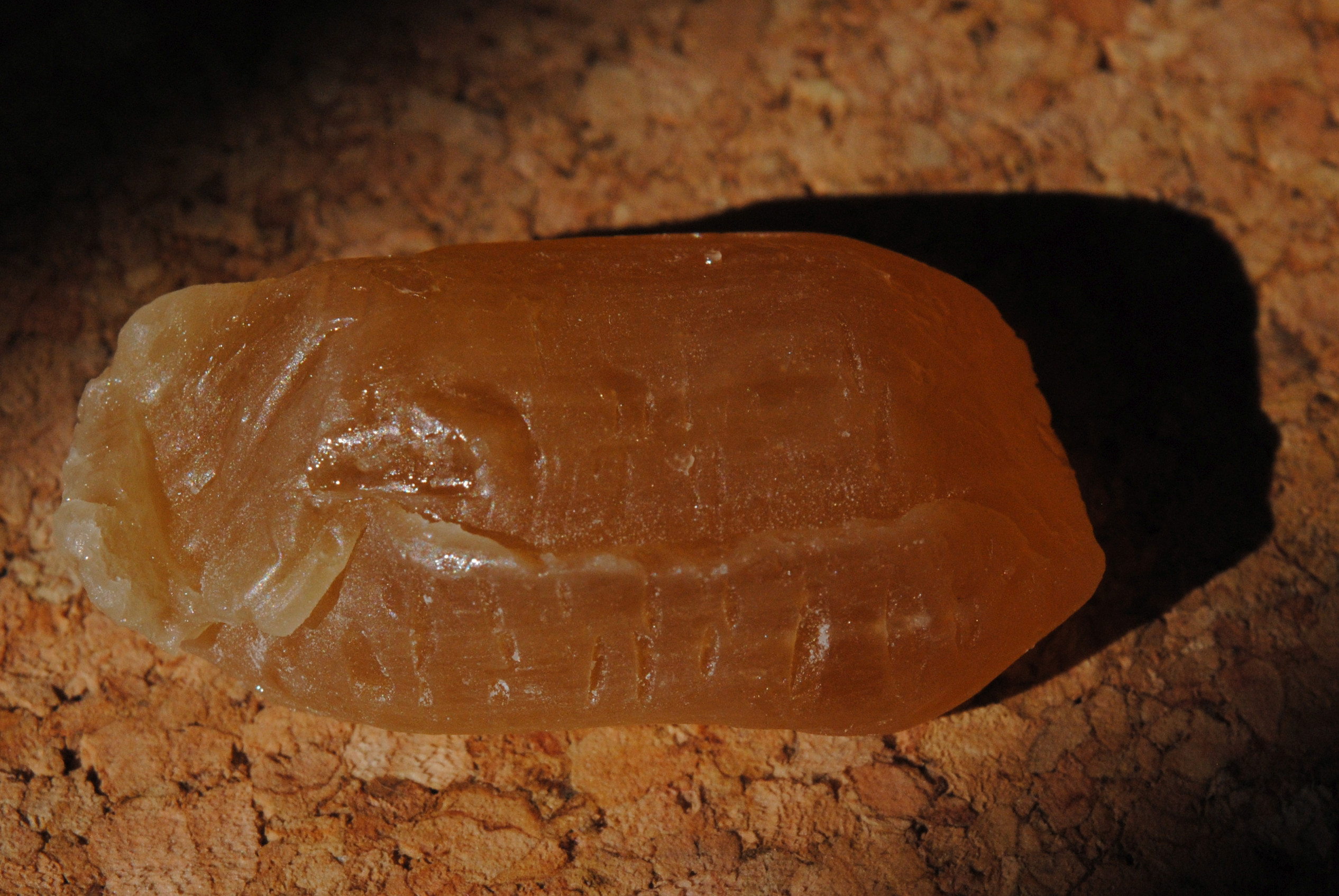
An unwrapped 'Troach drop', purchased at the Black Country Living Museum in the English Midlands, where such sweets are traditional

Anise is sweet and aromatic, distinguished by its characteristic flavor. The seeds, whole or ground, are used for preparation of teas and tisanes (alone or in combination with other aromatic herbs), as well many regional and ethnic confectioneries, including black jelly beans (often marketed as licorice-flavored), British aniseed balls, aniseed twists and "troach" drops, Australian humbugs, New Zealand aniseed wheels, Italian pizzelle and biscotti, German Pfeffernüsse and Springerle, Austrian Anisbögen, Dutch muisjes, New Mexican bizcochitos and Peruvian picarones.

The culinary uses of anise are not limited only to sweets and confections, as it is a key ingredient in Mexican atole de anís and champurrado, which is similar to hot chocolate. In India and Pakistan, it is taken as a digestive after meals, used in brines in the Italian region of Apulia and as a flavoring agent in Italian sausage, pepperoni and other Italian processed meat products. The freshly chopped leaves are added to cheese spreads, dips or salads, while roots and stems impart a mild licorice flavor to soups and stews.

=== Liquor ===
Anise alcohols of the Mediterranean region

Anise is used to flavour Greek ouzo and Bulgarian mastika; Italian sambuca; French absinthe, anisette, and pastis; Portuguese anis which has an aniseed stem in each bottle crystallised with sugar, Spanish anis de chinchón, anís, anísado, and Herbs de Majorca; Turkish rakı; Lebanese, Egyptian, Syrian, Jordanian, Palestinian and Israeli arak; and Algerian Anisette Cristal. Outside the Mediterranean region, it is found in Colombian aguardiente and Mexican Xtabentún. These liqueurs are clear, but on addition of water become cloudy, a phenomenon known as the ouzo effect or louche.

Anise is used together with other herbs and spices in some root beers, such as Virgil's in the United States.

=== Traditional medicine ===
The main use of anise in traditional European herbal medicine was for its carminative effect (reducing flatulence), as noted by John Gerard in his Great Herball, an early encyclopedia of herbal medicine:

The seed wasteth and consumeth winde, and is good against belchings and upbraidings of the stomach, alaieth gripings of the belly, provoketh urine gently, maketh abundance of milke, and stirreth up bodily lust: it staieth the laske (diarrhea), and also the white flux (leukorrhea) in women.

According to Pliny the Elder, anise was used as a cure for sleeplessness, chewed with alexanders and a little honey in the morning to freshen the breath, and, when mixed with wine, as a remedy for asp bites (N.H. 20.72). In 19th-century medicine, anise was prepared as aqua anisi ("Water of Anise") in doses of an ounce or more and as spiritus anisi ("Spirit of Anise") in doses of 5–20 minims. In Turkish folk medicine, its seeds have been used as an appetite stimulant, tranquilizer or diuretic.

=== Essential oil ===
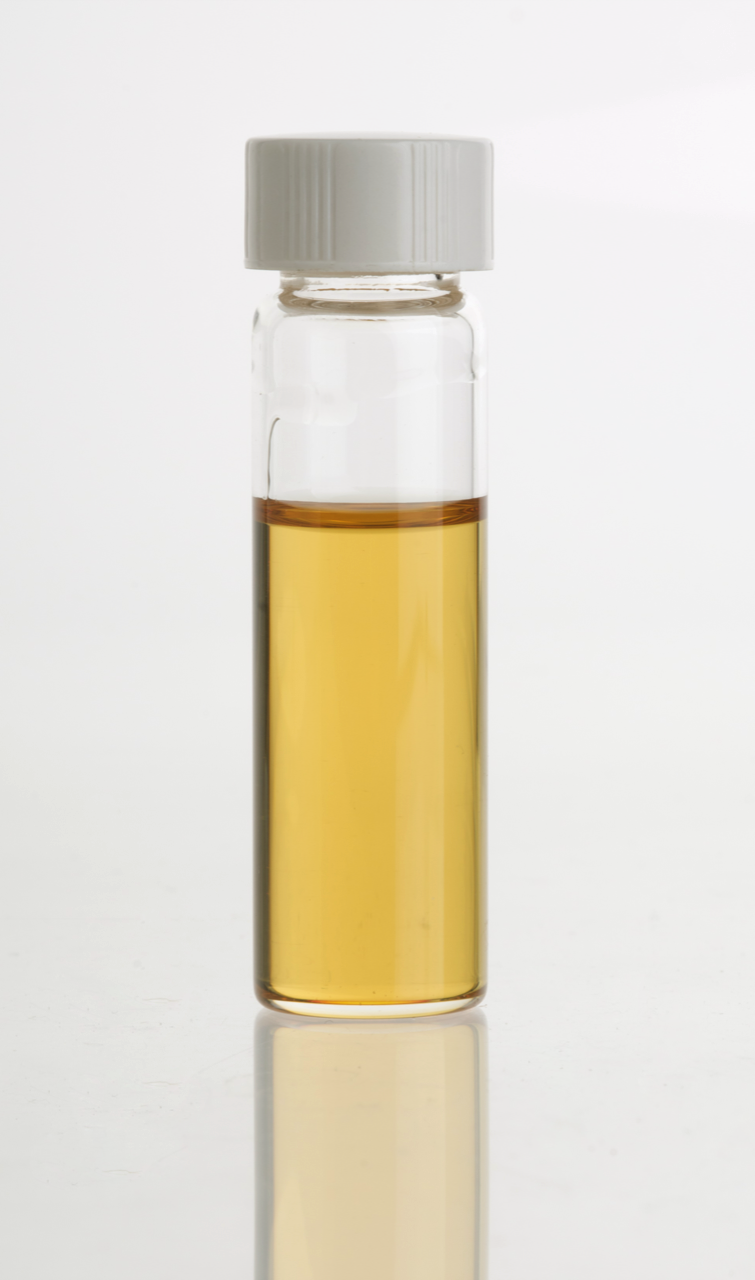
Anise essential oil

Anise essential oil can be obtained from the fruits by either steam distillation or extraction using supercritical carbon dioxide. The yield of essential oil is influenced by the growing conditions and extraction process, with supercritical extraction being more efficient. Regardless of the method of isolation the main component of the oil is anethole (80–90%), with minor components including 4-anisaldehyde, estragole and pseudoisoeugenyl-2-methylbutyrates amongst others. (Alternately found by Orav et al. 2008 to be 2–6% extracted oil by weight of raw seed material, 74–94% being trans-anethole and the remaining fraction estragole (methylchavicol), anisaldehyde and γ-himachalene.) Anethole is responsible for anise's characteristic odor and flavor.

=== Other uses ===
Builders of steam locomotives in Britain incorporated capsules of aniseed oil into white metal plain bearings so the distinctive smell would give warning in case of overheating. Anise can be made into a liquid scent and is used for both drag hunting and fishing. It is put on fishing lures to attract fish.
