= Shasta Beverages =

American soft drink brand

Shasta Beverages, Inc.

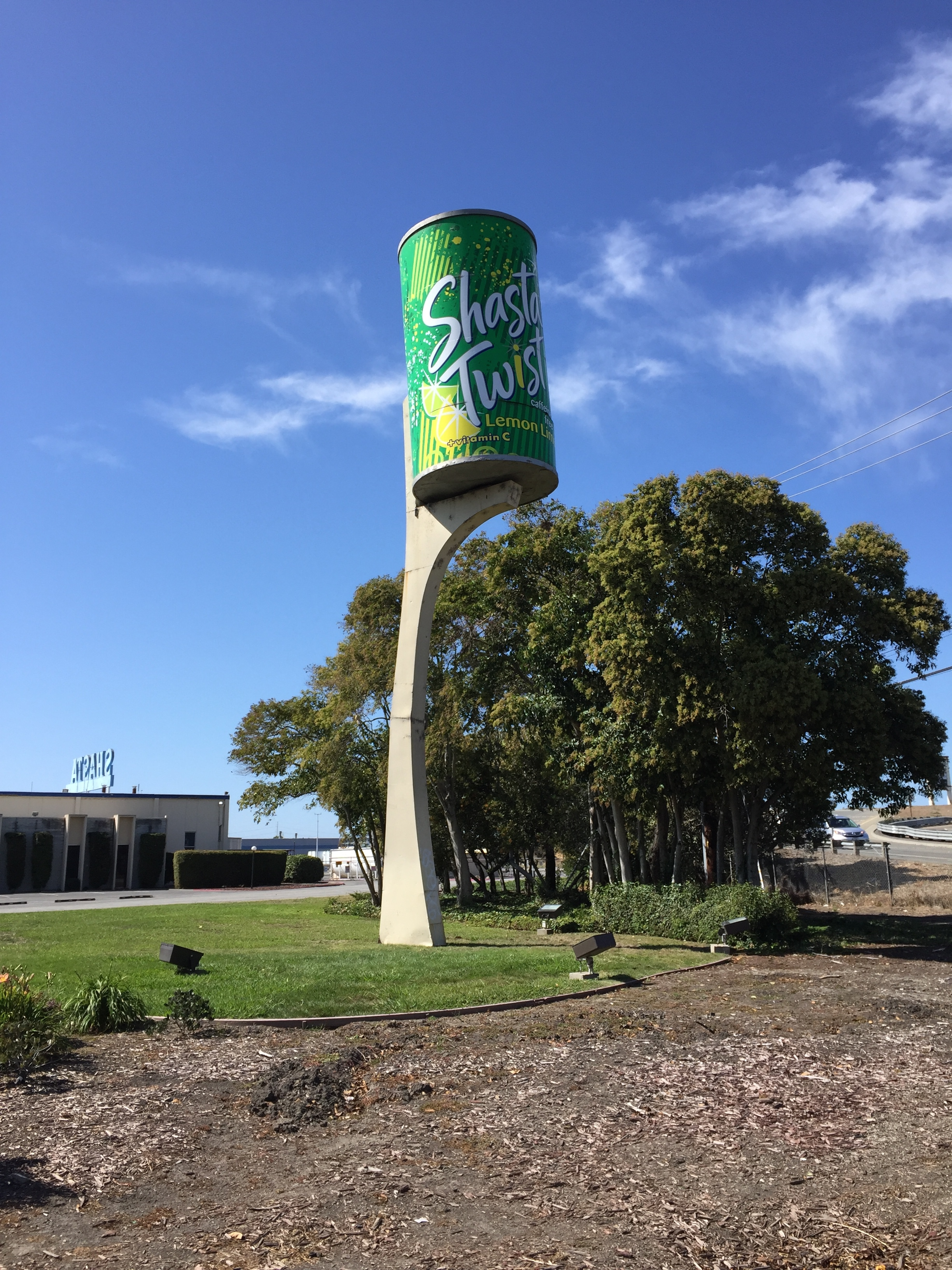
- Shasta Twist sculpture at the Shasta headquarters in Hayward, California
- Industry: Beverages
- Founded: December 6, 1889; 136 years ago, Siskiyou County, California
- Headquarters: Hayward, California, United States
- Area served: United States
- Products: Soft drinks, drink mixers
- Parent: National Beverage Corp.
- Subsidiaries: Shasta Beverages, Intl., Inc. Shasta Sales, Inc. Shasta Sweetener Corp. Shasta West, Inc.
- Website: www.shastapop.com

Shasta Beverages is an American soft drink manufacturer based in Hayward, California that markets a value-priced soft drink line with a wide variety of soda flavors, as well as a few drink mixers, under the brand name Shasta. The company name is derived from Mount Shasta in northern California and the associated Shasta Springs.

== History ==
Shasta began as "The Shasta Mineral Springs Company" at the base of Mt. Shasta, California, in 1889. In 1928, the name was changed to "The Shasta Water Company". It produced bottled mineral water from Shasta Springs in Northern California. The water was poured into glass-lined railroad cars and shipped off for local bottling.

In 1931, Shasta produced its first soft drink, a ginger ale; until the 1950s, the company's products were mainly alcoholic drink mixers: ginger ale, mineral water and club soda.

Shasta introduced new marketing strategies in the 1950s, which became industry standards: the packaging of soft drinks in cans, the introduction of low-calorie (i.e., “diet”) soft drinks, and the direct distribution of bottles and cans to grocers through wholesale channels.

By the 1960s, Shasta sodas and mixers were well-known in most of the western United States and parts of the Southwest. In 1966, Shasta was purchased by Consolidated Foods (later known as Sara Lee) and was renamed "Shasta Beverages". In 1985, the company was acquired by the National Beverage Corp., which also owns the similarly marketed Faygo value-priced line of soft drinks.

== Advertising ==
In the late 1960s and early 1970s, Shasta was heavily advertised on television in several popular humorous commercials. In the early 1980s, Shasta was expanding nationally and increasing advertising spending. In 1983, the company's ad agency hired Ministry frontman Al Jourgensen (at the time a rising synth pop musician) to write and perform a jingle for a commercial.

== Ingredients ==
Shasta Beverages uses high-fructose corn syrup as the sweetener in their drinks. Shasta diet soft drinks use sucralose and acesulfame potassium as non-nutritive sweeteners. Some of their sugar-based drinks, including their cola, use a combination of high-fructose corn syrup and sucralose. Ingredients for some of their sodas are as follows (in decreasing order by % of product):

- Diet Cola: carbonated water, caramel color, phosphoric acid, citric acid, potassium citrate, sucralose, potassium benzoate (a preservative), caffeine, acesulfame potassium, natural flavor
- Root Beer: carbonated water, high-fructose corn syrup, caramel color, natural and artificial flavors, potassium benzoate (preservative), sucralose
- Tiki Punch: carbonated water, high-fructose corn syrup, citric acid, potassium benzoate, gum acacia, natural and artificial flavor, glyceryl abietate, red 40
- Orange Soda: carbonated water, high-fructose corn syrup, citric acid, potassium benzoate (preservative), modified corn starch, glyceryl abietate, natural flavor, yellow 6, vitamin C (ascorbic acid), sucralose, calcium disodium EDTA, red 40
- Black Cherry: carbonated water, high-fructose corn syrup, citric acid, natural and artificial flavors, potassium benzoate (preservative), caramel color, red 40, sucralose, blue 1
- Creme Soda: carbonated water, high-fructose corn syrup, potassium benzoate, citric acid, caramel color, artificial flavor, sucralose

== Products ==
Shasta currently produces 34 varieties of soft drinks and mixers for mixing alcoholic drinks, including:

- Apple
- Black Cherry and Black Cherry Zero Sugar
- California Dreamin' (orange creamsicle)
- Club Soda
- Cola and Cola Zero Sugar
- Cherry Cola
- Creme Soda and Creme Soda Zero Sugar
- Dr. Shasta (similar to Dr Pepper) and Dr. Shasta Zero Sugar
- Fiesta Punch
- Ginger Ale and Ginger Ale Zero Sugar
- Grape and Grape Zero Sugar
- Kiwi Strawberry
- Mountain Rush (similar to Mountain Dew)
- Orange and Orange Zero Sugar
- Pineapple
- Raspberry Creme (raspberry-vanilla)
- Root Beer and Root Beer Zero Sugar
- Strawberry and Strawberry Zero Sugar
- Tiki Punch and Tiki Punch Zero Sugar
- Tonic Water
- Twist (lemon-lime) and Twist Zero Sugar
- Very Cherry Twist
- Zazz (grapefruit) and Grapefruit Zero Sugar

=== Discontinued flavors ===
These are the soft drink flavors that have been discontinued by Shasta Beverages, including a line of flavors targeting Hispanic consumers(‡) that was introduced in 2007.

- Arctic Sun
- Bubble Gum
- Chocolate and Diet Chocolate
- Cranberry
- Fruit Punch (carbonated)
- Fruit Punch (non-carbonated)
- Guava-Passion Fruit
- Horchata ‡ (based on the Mexican drink)
- Iced Tea with Lemon
- Jamaica ‡ (hibiscus flavored)
- Diet Kiwi Strawberry
- Lemonade
- Mango
- Pineapple Orange
- Raspberry Soda
- Red Apple Soda
- Red Creme Soda
- Red Pop
- Ruby Red Grapefruit
- Sangria ‡ (nonalcoholic)
- Strawberry Peach and Diet Strawberry Peach
- Tamarindo ‡
- Tiki Blue
- Tiki Mist
- Tiki Orange Mango
- Vanilla Cola and Diet Vanilla Cola
- Wild Raspberry

Partially obscured vintage billboard for Shasta Orange Soda (San Francisco, California, 2004)

In 1993, Shasta Beverages offered flavors such as Mario Punch and Princess Toadstool Cherry, which were produced in 8-ounce cans and marketed to children.

From 2003 to 2006, Shasta Beverages sold soft drinks called "Shasta Shortz" that were also marketed to children. Shasta Shortz products were produced in 8-ounce cans and had sweeter, more candy-like flavors, including Bubble Gum, Camo Orange Creme, Chillin' Cherry Punch, Cotton Candy, Rah-Rah Root Beer, and Red Grape Stain.
