= Nom yen =

Thai iced beverage

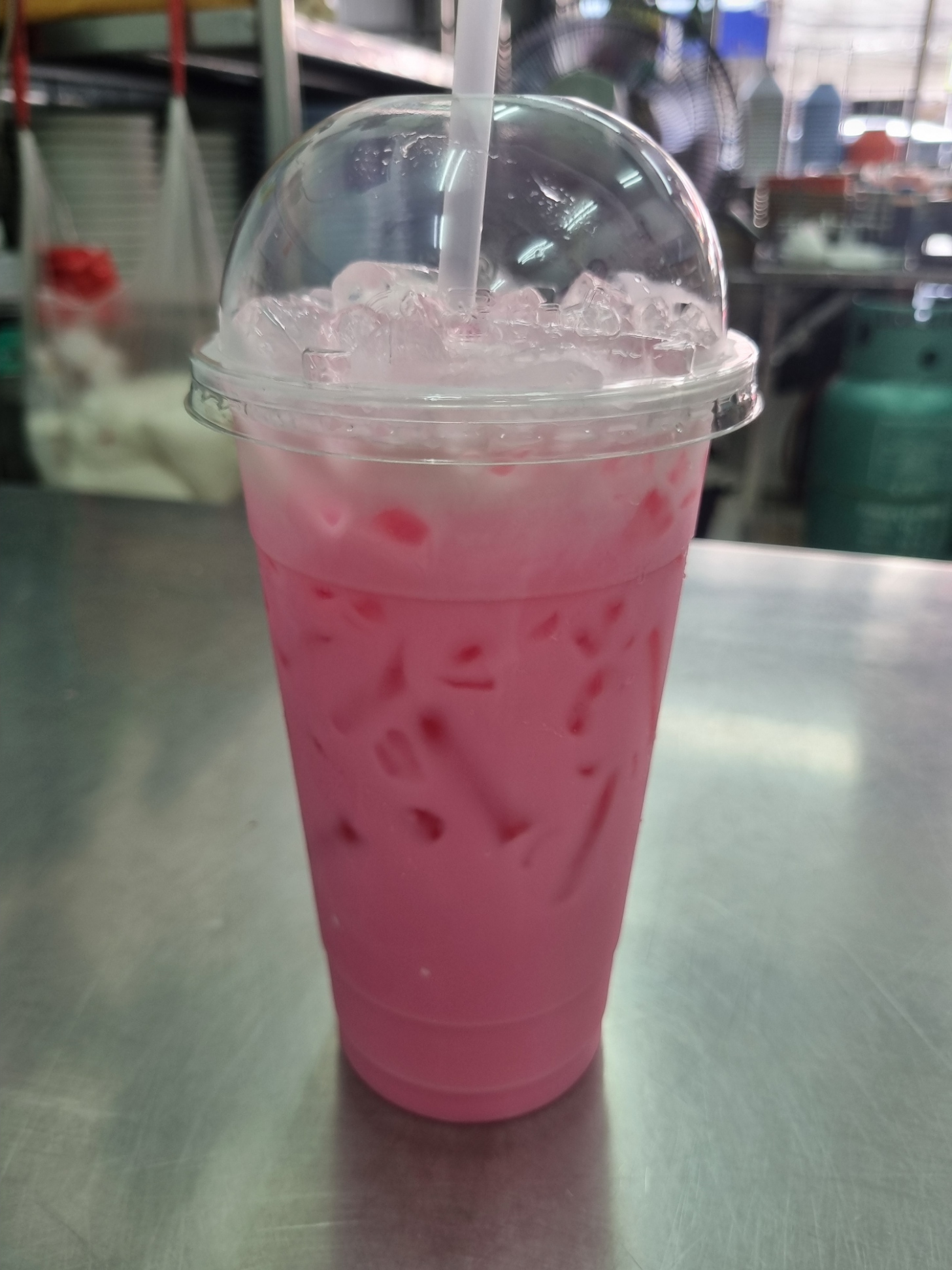
Nom Yen from a street vendor

Nom yen (Thai: นมเย็น, pronounced [nōm jēn]) (also known as นมชมพู) is an iced beverage from Thailand. Known for its pink color, this drink is a fusion of milk and sala syrup made from the salak fruit. It is widely enjoyed across the country and can be found from street vendors and cafés, especially as a refreshing drink during hot and humid months.

== Definition ==
The name Nom Yen translates to "cold milk" in Thai, with Nom meaning "milk" and Yen meaning "cold" or "iced." It is also known as Nom Chompoo, with “Chompoo” meaning pink from its color.

== Preparation ==
The drink is typically prepared by mixing sweetened condensed milk with evaporated milk or using fresh hot milk, then combining it with salak syrup (notably Hale's Blue Boy brand). This mixture is then poured over ice.

== Variants ==
Nom Yen and its components, particularly sala syrup, are also utilized in various Thai desserts to add flavor and color Sala syrup is often incorporated into agar-agar or jelly-based desserts, known as knanom chan, giving them a bright pink hue and a fruity, floral flavor. These desserts may include layers of coconut milk or fruit. In namkhaeng sais, Nom Yen is used as a topping or mixed with other syrups and condensed milk. It adds a creamy texture and sweet flavor to the shaved ice, which is often topped with a variety of toppings like red beans, sweet corn, and jellies.

== See also ==
- Bandung (drink) – a similar beverage from Singapore and Malaysia, but prepared with rose syrup
- Sharbat (drink) – Sweet drinks
