= Breuvages Kiri =

Canadian company

Breuvages Kiri, L.P.
- Company type: Limited partnership
- Industry: Beverages
- Founded: 1924
- Defunct: 2011
- Fate: Bankruptcy
- Headquarters: 46.1711°N 73.4162°W, 4130, rue Principale; Saint-Félix-de-Valois, Quebec, Canada
- Area served: Quebec; Northwestern New Brunswick; Ontario
- Key people: Alain Bracchi
- Products: Soft Drinks, Bottled Water
- Services: private label
- Number of employees: 40
- Divisions: TechnoBev
- Website: Kiri.com

Breuvages Kiri, L.P., (also known as Technobev S.E.C.) was a Canadian independent manufacturer of soft drinks, bottled water and other non-alcoholic beverages. The head office and its principal production facilities were located in Saint-Félix-de-Valois, Quebec, in the region of Lanaudière. Kiri enjoyed a modest share of the regional beverage market for more than 30 years before shutting down.

TechnoBev soft drinks were marketed in Ontario under the brand name Snow White, with no mention of Kiri on the product packaging.

The company's brands included Kiri cola and Snow White black cherry, root beer, strawberry, champagne cider, spruce beer and other flavours. The company was originally called Liqueurs Bergeron.

Kiri was featured in Season 5, episode 11 of the TV series How It's Made.

The company successfully filed for bankruptcy protection in February 2011 and ceased production shortly after.
