= La Croix Sparkling Water =

American brand of carbonated water

LaCroix

- 12oz can of LaCroix Orange
- Type: Sparkling water
- Manufacturer: National Beverage Corporation
- Origin: La Crosse, Wisconsin, United States
- Introduced: 1980; 46 years ago
- Website: www.lacroixwater.com

LaCroix or La Croix (/ləˈkrɔɪ/ lə-KROY) (Note: The French la croix (lit. 'the cross') is pronounced French pronunciation: [la kʁwa], and some English speakers use approximations of this to refer to the brand. Only /ləˈkrɔɪ/, however, is considered correct for the brand, matching the pronunciation of the eponymous St. Croix River.) is an American brand of sparkling water that originated in La Crosse, Wisconsin, by G. Heileman Brewing Company and is now distributed by National Beverage Corporation. The available flavors include various fruits and fruit blends.

== History ==
In February 1980, the G. Heileman Brewing Company, of La Crosse, Wisconsin, introduced LaCroix as one of the first "Anti-Perrier" brands, meant to appeal to sparkling water consumers who were put off by Perrier's "snobbish positioning", LaCroix marketed to its niche by imaging itself as an "all occasion" beverage. Its name is pronounced like the St. Croix River, which forms part of Wisconsin's western border.

The beverage fared well in popularity and sales in the surrounding Midwest region for the following decade. By 1992, the brand was estimated to be worth US$25 million. However, in the same year, due to Heileman's admitted lack of experience outside the beer market, it sold the brand to National Beverage (then Winterbrook).

In 2002, National Beverage sought to rebrand LaCroix and ended up settling on a design that was "least favored by management" but won over target consumers in a "landslide". Instead of staying with a clean and simple design like other water brands, they found that a more bold and colorful approach was more appealing to their audience.

Since the early 1990s, LaCroix had been a fairly well-known product in the Midwest United States. But when U.S. sugary-soda sales plummeted to a 30-year low in the spring of 2015, National Beverage took the opportunity to expand their consumer base by launching a social media marketing campaign targeting millennials. Sales exploded as the brand developed a national cult following. Their marketing efforts have since helped position LaCroix with mainstream news outlets as a healthier alternative to sugary soda, as well as a mixer for popular cocktails.

In 2025, JDM Distributors Limited became the first official distributor in the UK for La Croix. The brand proved popular as sales started off strongly, with repeat orders from e-commerce platforms aimed at American expats such as American Grocer.

In 2026, Continental Bridge Trading Limited became the exclusive distributor in Cyprus for LaCroix.

== Sales ==
Sales records have never been publicly released, but market research suggests LaCroix holds a 30 percent market share in sparkling water sales in the United States, double that of its main competitor, Perrier.

== Lawsuits ==
=== Sexual harassment allegations ===
Nick Caporella, the company's CEO, was accused of sexual harassment by two former employee pilots who alleged inappropriate touching on more than 30 trips between 2014 and 2016. One lawsuit was settled out of court in January 2018, and one was still pending as of July 2018. Caporella has denied the claims and as of 2023 there has been no turnover.

=== "All-natural" advertising ===
In October 2018 a class action lawsuit was filed by Chicago law firm Beaumont Costales regarding the "all natural" branding, claiming that LaCroix uses synthetic ingredients including ethyl butanoate, limonene and linalool propionate. The company responded that "all the flavor essences in LaCroix are natural." The plaintiff has since withdrawn the lawsuit and retracted its claims.

Another lawsuit was filed in the Southern District of New York on January 29, 2019, alleging violations of New York’s Unfair and Deceptive Trade Practices Act. The lawsuit's claims are based on isotope analysis and gas chromatography mass spectrometry tests conducted by The Center for Applied Isotope Studies at the University of Georgia. This claim was also voluntarily dropped in September 2020. A similar lawsuit was filed against Polar Beverages in September 2019 regarding its "100% natural" marketing.

== Flavors ==
Year	Base	Cúrate	NiCola
2004	Pure (Unflavored) Lemon Lime Cran-Raspberry (Razz-Cranberry) Orange Berry		
2008	Pamplemousse (Grapefruit)		
2011	Coconut		
2012	Peach-Pear		
2014	Apricot Mango Passionfruit	Cerise Limón (Cherry Lime) Pomme Bayá (discontinued) Piña Fraise	
2015	Tangerine	Kiwi Sandia (discontinued) Melón Pomelo (discontinued) Múre Pepino (Cucumber Blackberry)	laCola Cubana (discontinued) Cafe Cola (discontinued)
2017	Key Lime		
2019			Coconut Cola (discontinued) Cubana (Mojito) (discontinued) Coffea Exotica (Sumatra coffee and cola) (discontinued)
2020	Hi-Biscus! LimonCello Pastèque (Watermelon)		
2021	Beach Plum Black Razzberry Guava São Paulo		
2022	Cherry Blossom		
2023	Mojito		
2024	Strawberry Peach		
2025	Sunshine		
2026	Pineapple Coconut		

== See also ==
- Apollinaris
- Farris
- Gerolsteiner
- Panna
- Perrier
- Polar Beverages
- Ramlösa
- S.Pellegrino
