= National Beverage =

American beverage company

National Beverage Corp.
- Company type: Public
- Traded as: Nasdaq: FIZZ; S&P 600 component
- Industry: Beverages (nonalcoholic)
- Founded: 1985; 41 years ago, in Fort Lauderdale, Florida, U.S.
- Headquarters: Plantation, Florida, U.S.
- Key people: Nick A. Caporella (chairman & CEO)
- Products: Soft drinks
- Revenue: ▲US$1,172.9 million (2023)
- Net income: ▲$142.2 million (2023); 12.1% profit margin
- Owner: Nick A. Caporella (77%)
- Number of employees: ▲1,640 (April 27, 2019)
- Subsidiaries: Big Shot Beverage Co.; Everfresh Beverages, Inc.; Faygo Beverages, Inc.; The Coffee Beanery LTD; LaCROIX Beverages, Inc.; National Retail Brands, Inc.; Shasta Beverages, Inc.
- Website: nationalbeverage.com

National Beverage Corp. is an American beverage developer, manufacturer, and distributor based in Fort Lauderdale, Florida, focused on flavored soft drinks, with its most noted brands being La Croix, Shasta, and Faygo.

== History ==
National Beverage Corporation was formed in 1985 by Nick A. Caporella as a shell company to fend off an unwanted acquisition by Victor Posner of Burnup & Sims Inc., an installer of cable television and telecommunications systems. As company earnings for Burnup & Sims grew nearly threefold between 1978 and 1981, Posner "decided to secure a piece of the rising profits". Caporella was the CEO of Burnup & Sims at the time, and was opposed to Posner's attempt to acquire control of the company. Posner had acquired 43% of the company's stock between 1982 and 1985, and by then Caporella was concerned Posner would soon have a controlling stake. Caporella formed a partnership which founded National Beverage Corporation, which immediately traded stock between itself and Burnup & Sims in order to reduce Posner's ownership level and ensure Caporella (or businessed controlled by him) could retain a majority stake in Burnup & Sims. Caporella needed to ensure his additional company could do business, and acquired Shasta Beverages from Sara Lee Corporation in 1985 for US$40 million in cash and Burnup & Sims shares. To make National a major player, Caporella purchased Faygo, a Midwest regional soft drink manufacturer, from Tree Sweet Products Corp. With its 12 bottling plants, National branched out into bottling store brands.

In 1991, National Beverage went public to sell Burnup & Sims's shares in National Beverage, which was partially successful. A Burnup & Sims stockholder sued due to Caporella's salary from Burnup and percentage of revenue from National Beverage, forcing Caporella to spend less time managing the company. In the early 1990s, Spree, an all-natural, carbonated soft drink, and Big Shot, a regional, multiflavored soft drink line, were acquired. In 1992, the US Navy contracted for the manufacture of "Sea", their ship store's brand. In the mid-1990s, juice producer Everfresh Beverages Inc. and carbonated/still water producer WinterBrook Corp. became subsidiaries of National. WinterBrook brought three brands to the National Beverage group of companies: Cascadia, WinterBrook Clear, and LaCroix. National acquired Home Juice Company, home of the Home Juice and Mr. Pure brands, at the end of the 1990s.

In the early 2000s, National purchased Beverage Canners International Inc., the owner of the Ritz and Crystal Bay soft drinks and sparkling waters brands.

In 2002, the company changed its strategy by focusing on bottling its own brands and ending private-label bottling. National moved to create new products for specific market demographics starting in 2003 with the launch of Shasta Shortz (a soda marketed to kids) and Fruitika (a fruit nectars line). In 2004, Diet Shasta started using Splenda No Calorie Sweetener.

== Energy Drinks ==
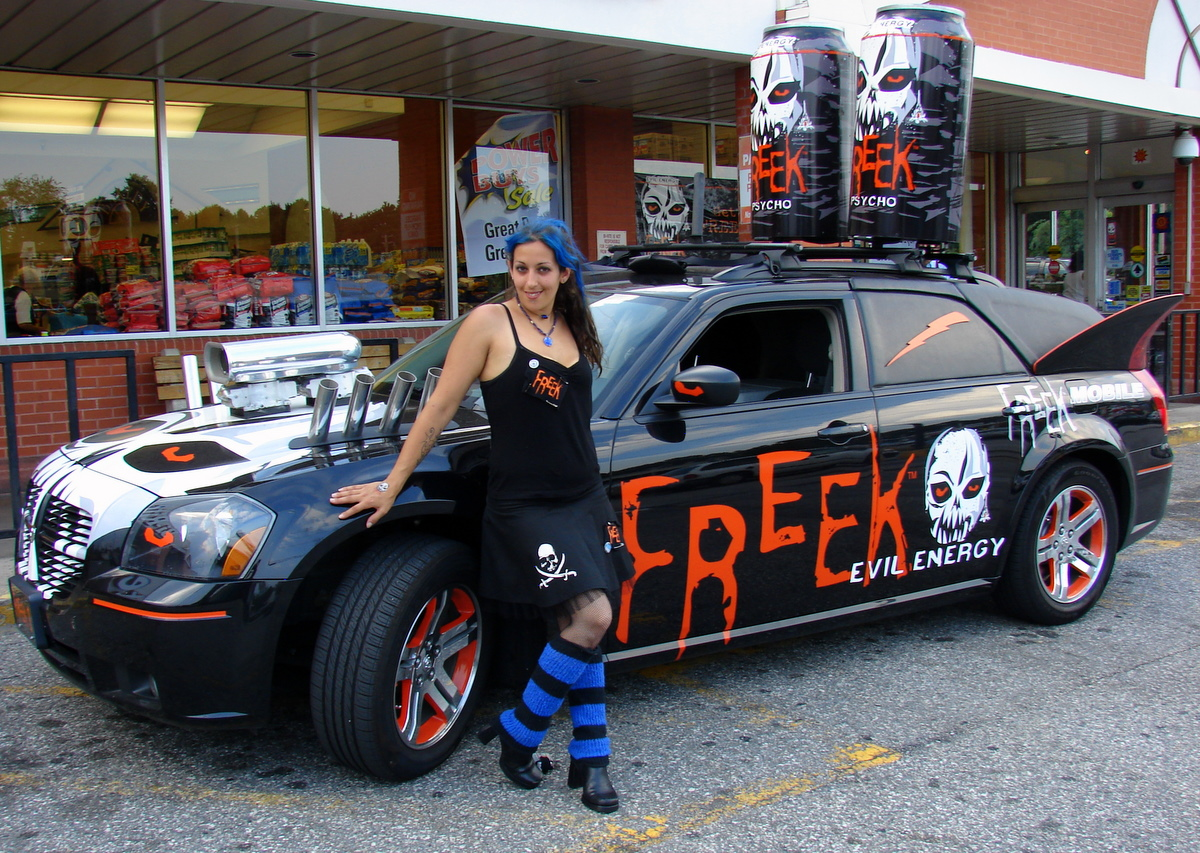
A promotional model stands in front of a branded Dodge Magnum (LX) to advertise Freek energy drink in 2007.

In 2004 National Beverage created Rip It, a general energy drink line. Beginning in 2006, National Beverage launched several new energy drink lines to capitalize on a market-wide boom in energy drink sales. Freek, a line of energy drinks aimed at teenagers and young adults, was first launched first solely in Detroit to test the market. Strong sales in Detroit led to a national rollout of five flavors of Freek by the end of 2006. Also in 2006, National Beverage launched Rip It Chic - an "energy drink developed by women for women" - at that year's National Association of Convenience Stores show in Las Vegas. Chic won the People Magazine Trendsetters Award for Best New Beverage in 2007. National also tried a coffee-based energy drink, Triple Hit.

In 2007 Hansen Beverage Company sued National Beverage Corp. on the grounds that Freek energy drink cans were "confusingly similar to" Monster energy cans. Initially the courts ruled in favor of Hansen, blocking sales of Freek, but National appealed and the 9th Circuit U.S. Court of Appeals reversed the decision and permitted sales again on June 29th. Hansen then dropped the lawsuit just days after the reversal, as Hansen and National had reached an agreement weeks before the 9th Circuit Court reversed the initial injunction.

== List of brands ==
- Shasta
- Faygo
- Everfresh
- La Croix Sparkling Water
- Rip It
- ClearFruit
- Mr. Pure
- Ritz
- Crystal Bay
- Cascadia Sparkling Clear
- Ohana Punch
- Big Shot
- Double Hit
