= Hosmer Mountain Soda =

Soft-drink producer based in Connecticut

Hosmer Mountain Soda is a small soft drink producer based in eastern Connecticut. Hosmer Mountain Bottling Company was founded in 1912 as a spring water delivery service in the hamlet of Willimantic. and purchased in 1958 by Arthur J. Potvin; who made his soda flavors all by trial and error. Hosmer Mountain Soda has two locations in Connecticut, at 217 Mountain St. in Willimantic and one at 15 Spencer Street in Manchester.

== History of Owners ==
- 1912-1922: W.E. Clark
- 1923-1944: Abraham Beller
- 1945-1957: Fred Meyer
- 1958–Present: Arthur J. Potvin and his four sons Bill, John, Andy and Chuck

== Flavors ==
Hosmer makes about 35 Flavors including Diets, Seltzers and a line of "Antique Sodas" made with cane sugar. They feature all of the classic flavors of the New England Independent bottlers, such as Root Beer, Birch Beer, Cream Soda, Sarsaparilla and Lime Rickey. Other sodas include unique offerings such as Peach, Strawberry and Cranberry, Cocoa Cream and (cane sugar) Ginger Beer.

== Glass Bottles Only ==
Hosmer uses two sizes of reusable glass bottles (28 & 12 oz.) to package their products, which are then returned by customers, cleaned and refilled, in keeping with the company's long standing green mission. Hosmer Mountain has charged a deposit since before the CT State Bottle Bill required it of soft drink manufacturers.

== New Haven CT Hosmer Coop ==
Since 2007, Hosmer has been delivering many cases of its trademark high neck seltzer bottles to the Hosmer Coop in the East Rock neighborhood of New Haven, Connecticut. Starting with about 120 cases, the deliveries are now up to over 200 cases, distributed to 15-20 households across East Rock. Recently, the Farnam-Stovall household, founders of the Coop, donated over 20 jars filled with Hosmer seltzer bottle caps back to the company for an historical display in their store.

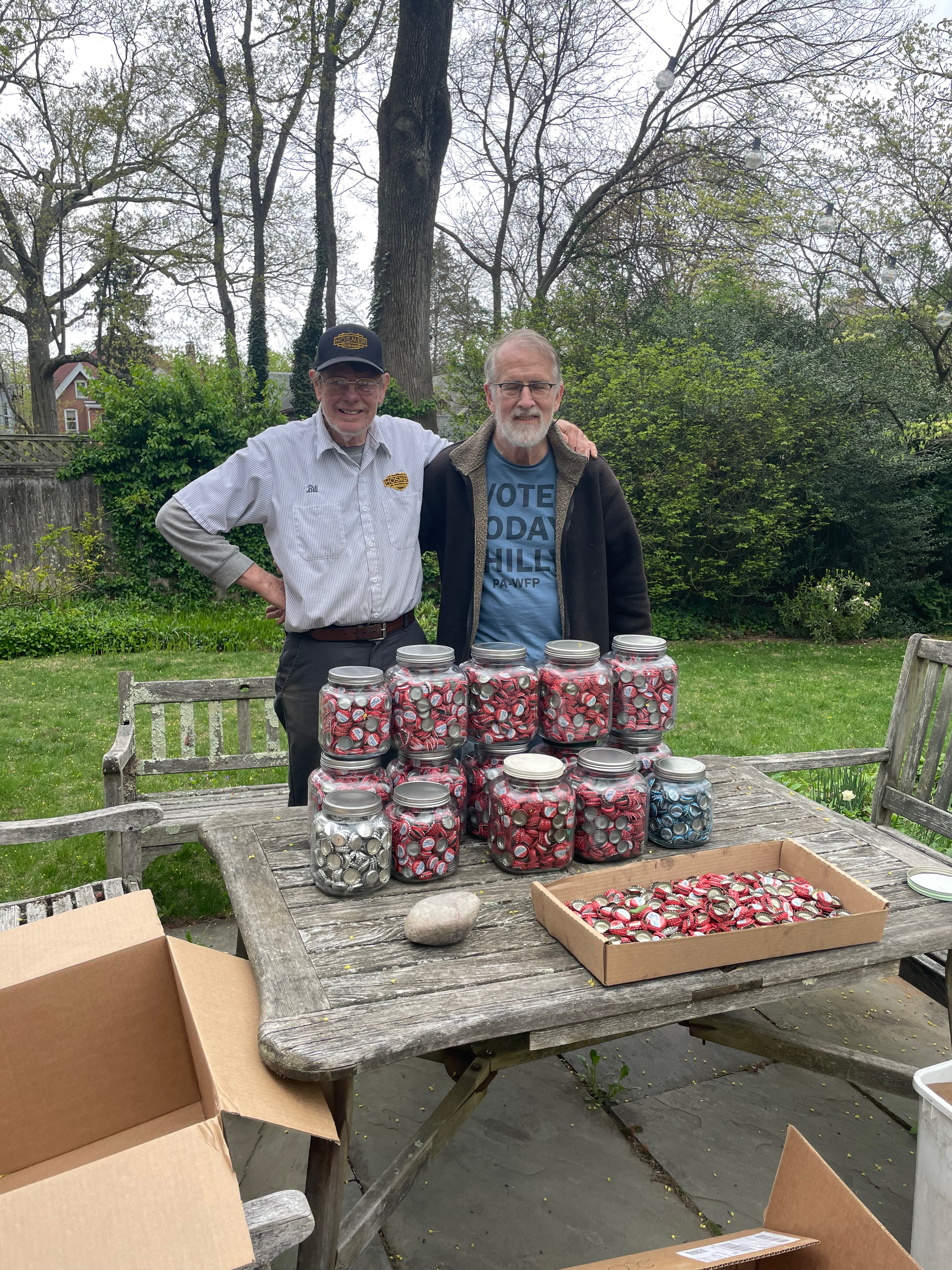
Bottle caps collected by one household in the Hosmer Coop since 2007, donated to the Hosmer Historical Display in the store in Willimantic
