= Original New York Seltzer =

Carbonated soft drink

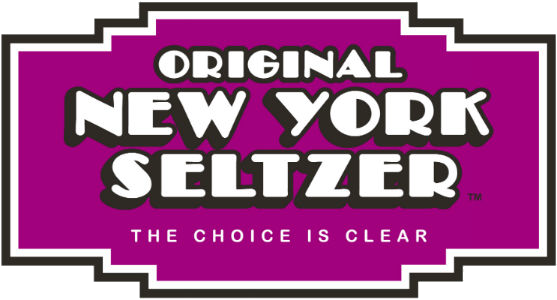
- Type: Soft Drink
- Origin: Walnut, California United States
- Introduced: 1981 & 2015 ^{(relaunched)}
- Discontinued: 1994 (original release)
- Color: None; clear
- Related products: Sparkling Water

Original New York Seltzer is a carbonated soft drink. It was produced from about 1981 to 1994 by father and son Alan and Randy Miller as a non-caffeinated line of sodas featuring natural flavors with no preservatives or artificial colors. The brand was revived in mid-2015, featuring eight flavors: Root Beer, Vanilla Cream, Raspberry, Peach, Lemon & Lime, BlueBerry, Black Cherry, and Concord Grape. Cola & Berry was added in 2016.

In 2017, Original New York Seltzer expanded into creating a new line of eight flavors of sparkling water, which include Grapefruit, Lime, Original, Orange, Watermelon, Lemon, Coconut and 6 Berry.
