= Virgil's Root Beer =

American brand of root beer

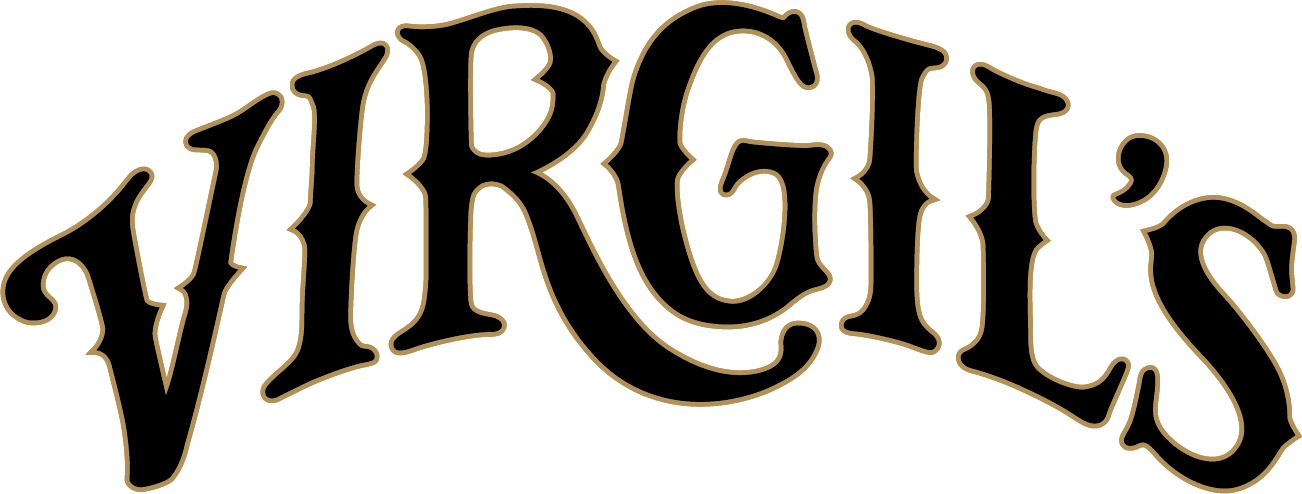
Virgil's Root Beer Logo

Virgil's Root Beer is an American brand of root beer that was created in 1994 by Edward Crowley and Jill Fraser Crowley, owners of Crowley Beverage Company.

In 1999, Reed's Inc. purchased the Virgil's Root Beer brand from the Crowley Beverage Company.

== Flavors ==
Virgil's Root Beer contains a blend of spices that includes anise, licorice, vanilla, cinnamon, cloves, nutmeg, wintergreen, cassia oil, pimento berry oil, and balsam oil.

In 1999, Virgil's started making vanilla cream, black cherry, orange, lemon-lime, and cola flavors. In 2018, the company made a zero-sugar product based on a sweetener blend containing erythritol, stevia, and monkfruit.

== In popular culture ==
In 2014, the brewing and bottling process of Virgil's Root Beer was presented on season 3 episode 18 of the Biography Channel's Food Factory, titled "A Taste of Japan."

== Lawsuit ==
On November 19, 2018, a class action lawsuit was filed against Reed's Inc., doing business as Virgil's Soda, alleging that the soda brand falsely labels products as preservative-free. The plaintiff alleges that the all natural, preservative-free labelling on Virgil's Root Beer and Virgil's Orange Cream Soda is fraudulent as they contain citric acid, which is a synthetic compound used as a preservative. The U.S. Food and Drug Administration (FDA) regulations have designated citric acid as a preservative. The plaintiff notes a previous FDA citation against Chiquita for falsely claiming a product as preservative-free when it contained citric acid.
