= Faygo =

American soft drink company

Faygo Beverages, Inc.
- Formerly: Feigenson Brothers Bottling Works
- Type: Subsidiary
- Industry: Beverages
- Founded: November 1907; 119 years ago in Detroit, Michigan
- Founders: Ben and Perry Feigenson
- Headquarters: Detroit, Michigan, US
- Products: Soft drinks; Energy drinks
- Parent: National Beverage Corporation
- Website: faygo.com

Faygo Beverages, Inc., is a soft drink company headquartered in Detroit, Michigan. The beverages produced by the company, branded as Faygo or Faygo Pop, are distributed in the Midwestern, Mid-Atlantic, and Central Southern regions of the United States, as well as southern and western Canada. Faygo Beverages, Inc. is a wholly owned subsidiary of the National Beverage Corporation, which was founded in Detroit in 1907 as Feigenson Brothers Bottling Works.

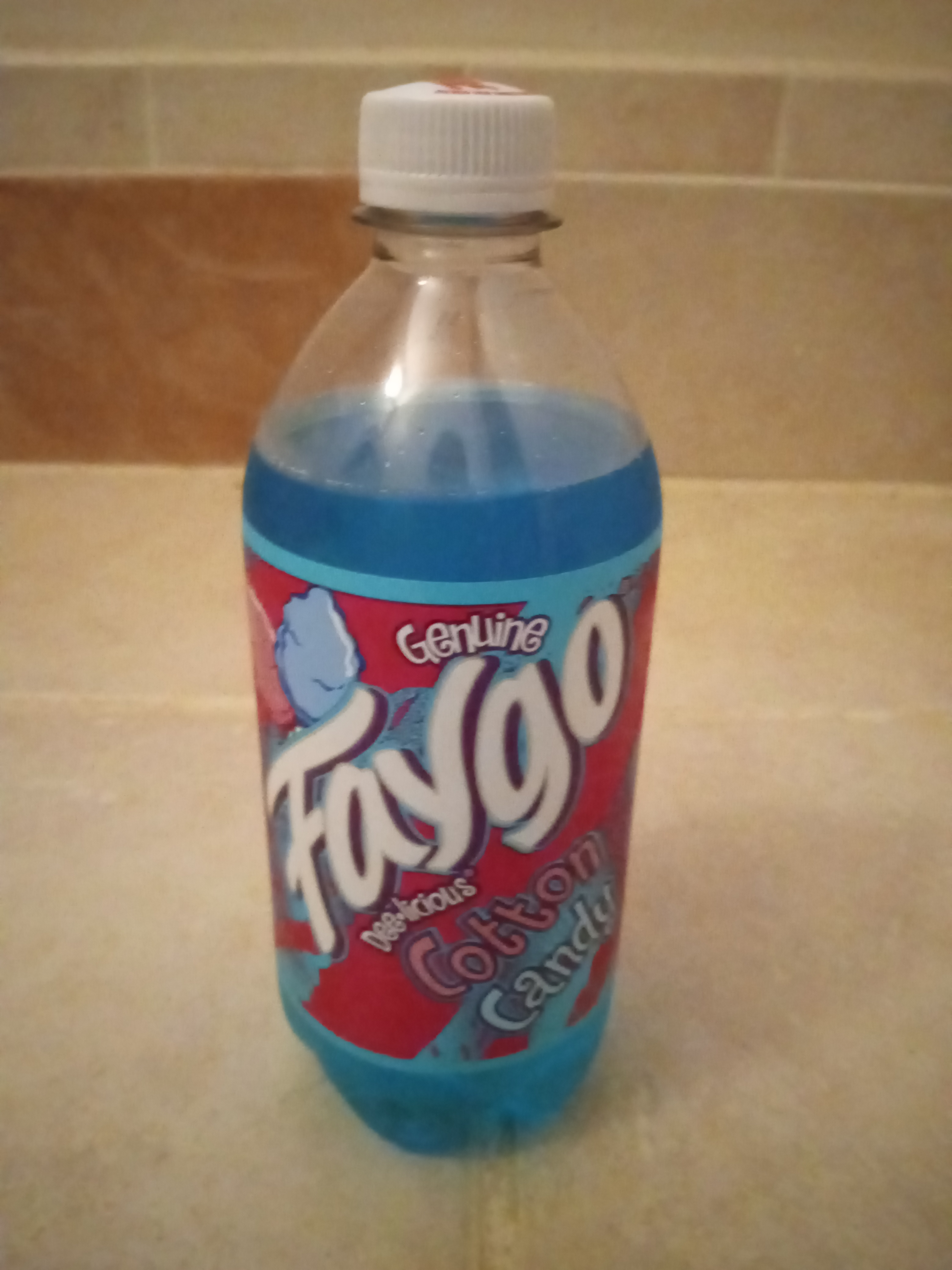
The cotton candy flavored Faygo pop

== History ==
The original logo used circa 1940

Faygo was founded in Detroit, Michigan, in November 1907, as Feigenson Brothers Bottle Works by Russian baker immigrants Ben and Perry Feigenson. The original flavors of Faygo (fruit punch, strawberry, and grape) were based on cake frosting recipes used by the Feigensons in Russia. Initially, the brothers used a horse-drawn wagon for deliveries and lived above the bottling plant.

As the business grew over the next 10 years, the Feigensons were able to purchase houses, hire their first employee, and acquire a second wagon and horse for deliveries. More flavors were added to the lineup, including Sassafras Soda and Lithiated Lemon. The brothers' success also allowed them to build a new plant on Detroit's Beaubien Street.

In 1921, as the company expanded, they decided the brand name "Feigenson Brothers" was too long and changed it to Faygo. The brothers bought their first delivery truck in 1922, and started home deliveries the following year. New flavors in the 1920s were a vanilla flavored soft drink, a seltzer water, "Ace Hi" (similar in flavor to Nehi), and Rock and Rye (named after a Prohibition Era drink). The company opened its currently operating bottling plant in 1935 on Gratiot Avenue in Detroit. The company briefly entered into beer production.

The brothers ran the company until the mid-1940s, when they turned it over to their sons. In 1956, the company created a series of radio and television advertisements featuring a fictional cowboy called the Faygo Kid, who was portrayed in animation for television commercials for Faygo Old-Fashioned Root Beer. Jim Henson's Muppets, Inc. produced a small series of ads for Faygo strawberry soda starring the Muppet characters Wilkins and Wontkins, best known as the spokes-characters for the Washington, D.C.–based Wilkins Coffee.

Because the drink had a limited shelf life, the company sold its products only in Michigan until the late 1950s. Company chemists later resolved this issue by installing a filtration system to remove impurities from the manufacturing plant's water system. In the 1960s, the soda's regional popularity expanded when the company began advertising during broadcasts of Detroit Tigers games. With the Tiger ads reaching beyond the Faygo market area at the time and the inability to cancel the ads, Faygo shipped products to the wholesalers' warehouses. This increased company sales from $6 million in 1966 to $20.4 million in 1971. Advertisements produced in the 1970s featured "everyday people" on a Boblo Boat singing the "Faygo Boat Song".

The company introduced a low-calorie version of their products in the 1960s called Ohana. This sub-line soon became a majority of company sales. In 1961, the Royal Line was launched as a premium product line. The juice extract used to produce the initial run of Royal Hawaiian Pineapple Orange was not sterilized and became rancid, causing a buildup of gases such that, after hitting store shelves, the bottles exploded. The soda was recalled and Dole gave Faygo enough sterilized juice to offset the company's losses. Six other flavors also entered into production in the 1960s. The original strawberry flavor from 1907 was renamed Redpop in the late 1960s.

With Michigan's beverage container deposit law passed in 1978, Faygo thought people would prefer returnable cans instead of glass. With this choice being incorrect, the company had a hard time making the switch back to bottles, cutting into profits for several years.

Assessing the industry and the second generation's pending retirement, the company was put up for sale. TreeSweet Products Corp. bought the company from the Feigenson family in early 1986 for $105 million. TreeSweet in turn sold the company to National Beverage Corp. a year later in 1987. In the 1980s, they introduced flavored carbonated water.

Faygo expanded in 1996 with a non-carbonated drink line, again named Ohana, which included punches, iced tea and lemonade. In 2007, Faygo celebrated its 100th anniversary with a new flavor and contests for label design. Ten thousand entries were received and a fourth-grade Ohio teacher won with Centennial Soda. In March 2014, the company introduced its ginger ale, Faygo Gold, rivaling cross town company Vernors' flagship drink.

== Current products ==
As of 2025, there are 57 beverage options offered by Faygo.

Flavors	Flavors (cont.)	Zero Sugar	Ohana
Bubble Pop!	Dr Faygo	Zero Sugar Cotton Candy	Ohana Blueberry Lemonade
Super Pop	Creme Soda	Zero Sugar Firework	Ohana Peach Melon
Jolly Green Apple	Cola	Zero Sugar Creme Soda	Ohana Lemonade & Iced Tea
Firework	Candy Apple	Zero Sugar Rock & Rye	Ohana Raspberry Lemonade
Fruit Punch	Black Cherry	Zero Sugar Cola	Ohana Punch
Pineapple Orange	60/40	Zero Sugar Ginger Ale	Ohana Lemonade
Raspberry Blueberry	Root Beer	Zero Sugar Twist	Ohana Kiwi Strawberry
Jazzin’ Blues Berry	Rock & Rye	Zero Sugar Tonic	Ohana Lemon Iced Tea
Twist	Redpop	Zero Sugar Root Beer	Ohana Blackberry Melonade
Tonic	Pineapple Watermelon	Zero Sugar Redpop	Ohana Mango Tango
Club Soda	Pineapple	Zero Sugar Grape	Ohana Pomberry Punch
Arctic Sun	Peach	Zero Sugar Moon Mist	
Cherry Cola	Orange	Zero Sugar Orange	
Cotton Candy	Moon Mist		
Grape	Moon Mist Blue		
Gold	Dreamin		
Ginger Ale			

== Reception ==
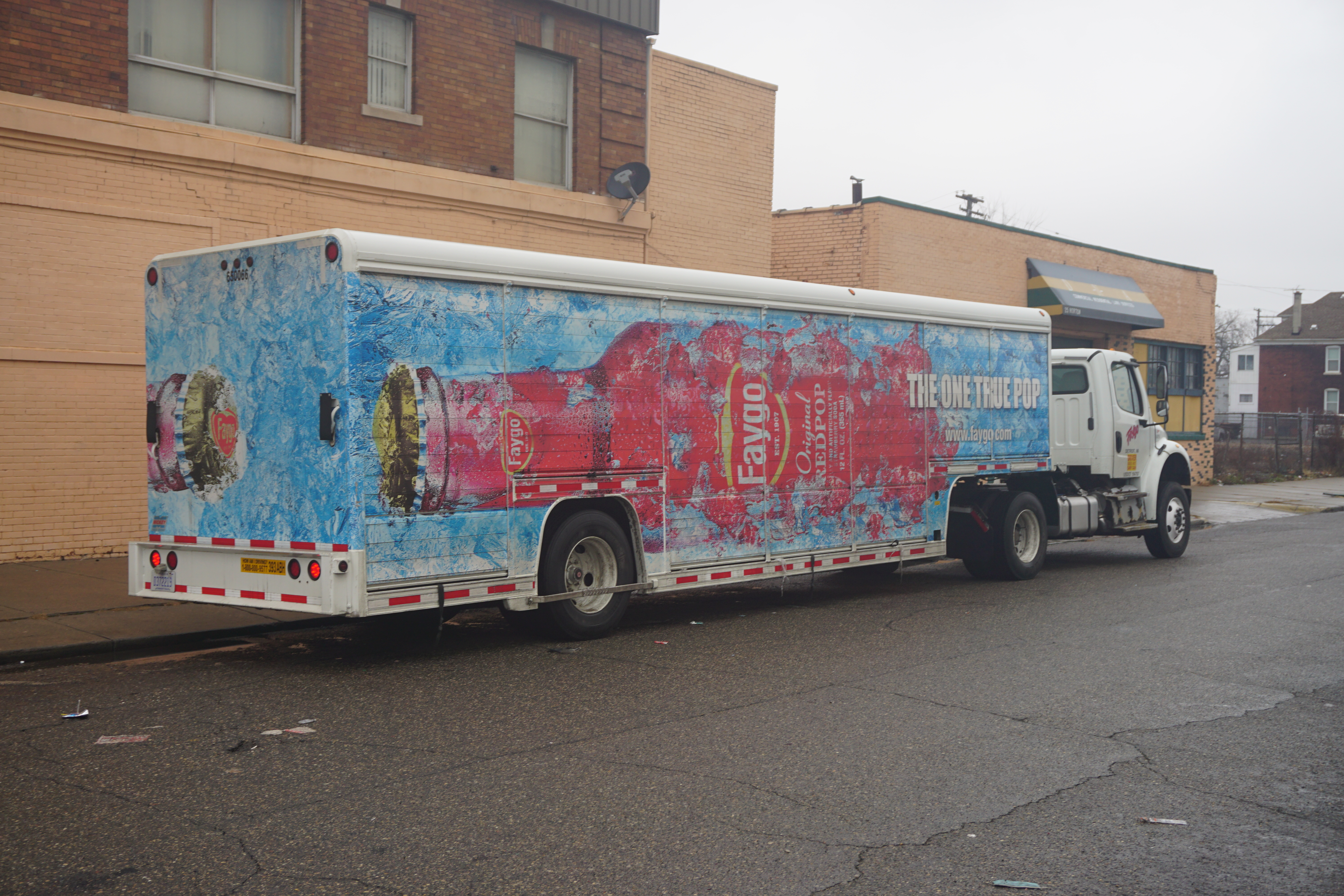
A Faygo delivery truck in Detroit

Faygo was ranked the best-tasting American root beer in the September 2009 issue of Bon Appétit, calling it "dry and crisp, with a frothy head, a good bite and a long finish".

== In popular culture ==
The Detroit-based hip hop group Insane Clown Posse references Faygo in several songs and sprays live audiences with "Faygo showers". The band has expressed interest in collaborating on limited edition product runs with the company, but Faygo has not reciprocated this interest as they desire to "keep a healthy distance" from the group.
