= Cola wars =

Soft drink marketing rivalry

An illustration of a can of Pepsi being poured into a Coca-Cola glass.

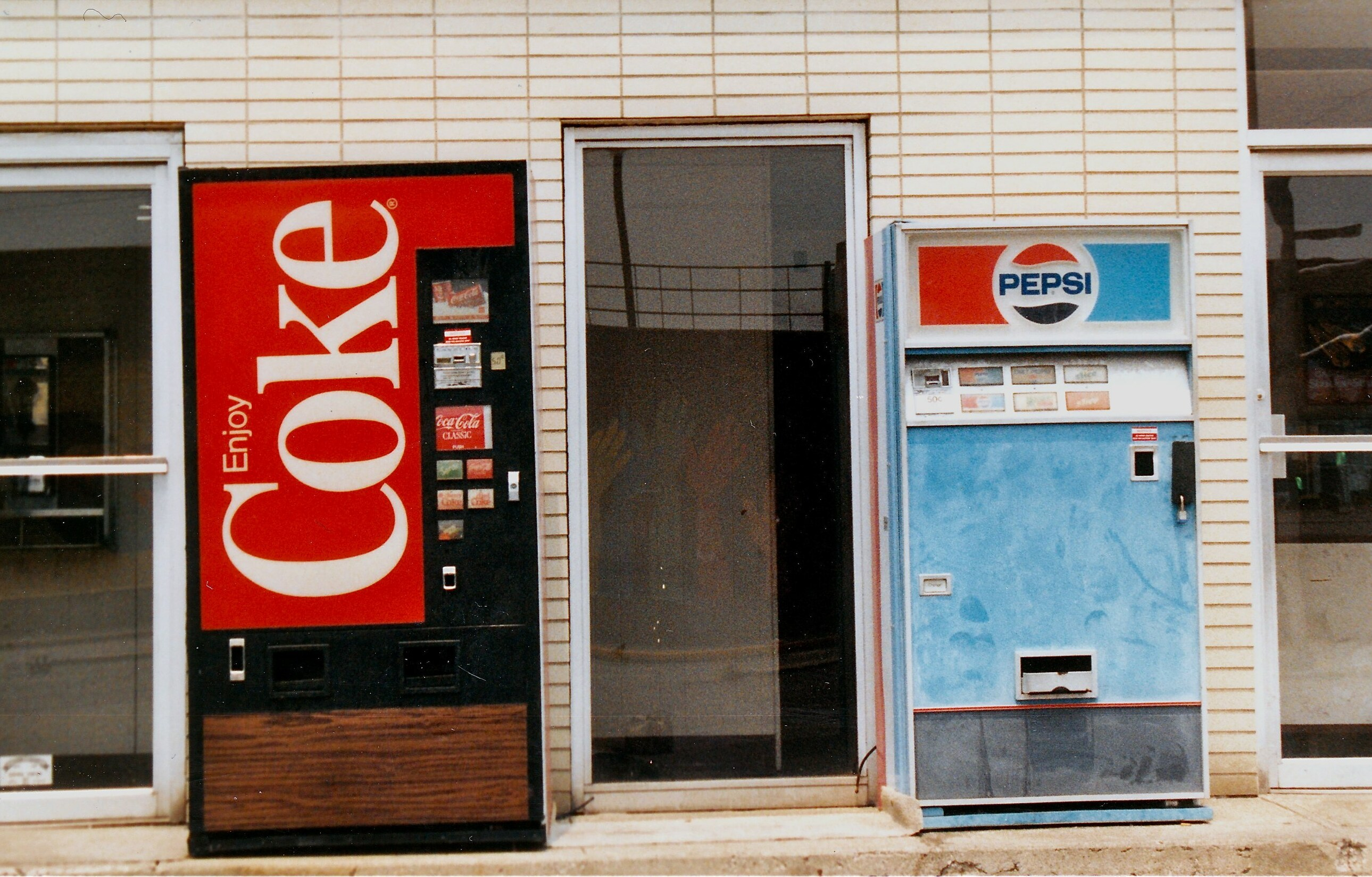
Coca-Cola and Pepsi vending machines side-by-side in Indianapolis, 1988

The Cola wars are the long-time rivalry between soft drink producers The Coca-Cola Company and PepsiCo, who have engaged in mutually targeted marketing campaigns for the direct competition between each company's product lines, especially their flagship colas, Coca-Cola and Pepsi. Beginning in the late 1970s and into the 1980s, the competition escalated until it became known as the cola wars.

== History ==
In 1885, John Stith Pemberton, a pharmacist from Columbus, Georgia, developed the original recipe for Coca-Cola. By 1888, control of the recipe was acquired by Asa Griggs Candler, who founded The Coca-Cola Company in 1896. Two years later in 1898 in New Bern, North Carolina, Caleb Bradham renamed his "Brad's Drink" to "Pepsi-Cola," and founded the Pepsi-Cola Company in 1902.

The two companies introduced advertising techniques, such as Coke's first celebrity endorsement and its 1915 contour bottle. However, market instability following World War I forced Pepsi to declare bankruptcy in 1923. In 1931, Pepsi went bankrupt once more, but recovered and began selling its products at 5 cents per bottle, helping them remain competitive in the market. Pepsi approached Coca-Cola with an offer to sell following both bankruptcies, but Coca-Cola declined.

Joya Williams, a secretary to Coca-Cola's global brand director, conspired to sell the Coca-Cola formula in 2006. Williams, along with her accomplices Ibrahim Dimson and Edmund Duhaney, conspired to sell the confidential trade secret to Pepsi for $1.5 million USD. However, Pepsi did not buy and instead reported the illegal offer to Coca-Cola and the FBI. The FBI conducted a sting operation posing as Pepsi executives, leading to the arrest of Williams and her accomplices. U.S. attorney David Nahmias praised Pepsi for reporting Williams' actions, saying, "if their trade secrets are violated, they all suffer, the market suffers and the community suffers."

== Advertising strategies ==
=== Coca-Cola ===
Coca-Cola advertising has often incorporated themes of wholesomeness and nostalgia, such as the Coca-Cola polar bears mascot and Santa Claus campaigns during Christmas.

=== Pepsi ===
Pepsi advertising strategy has prominently featured sponsorships and online marketing.

==== Pepsi Challenge ====
In 1975, Pepsi launched the Pepsi Challenge, in which people were asked which cola they preferred in blind taste tests. The campaign suggested that consumers favored Pepsi over Coca-Cola based solely on taste. This contributed to the competitive campaigns, and around this time, Coca-Cola introduced Diet Coke in 1982, and New Coke three years later. However, the Pepsi Challenge was a marketing campaign and not a scientific study. Subsequent studies with scientific controls found only modest differences between Pepsi and Coke. The campaign suggested that, when it came down to taste alone, consumers preferred Pepsi over Coca-Cola. Some researchers have suggested that the taste of the Coca-Cola and Pepsi Cola products were influenced by external factors, such as the temperature at which they were served.

==== "New Coke" ====
During the cola wars, as Coca-Cola saw its flagship product losing market share to Pepsi as well as to Diet Coke and competitors' products, the company considered a change to the beverage's formula and flavor. In April 1985, The Coca-Cola Company introduced its new formula for Coca-Cola, which became known as "New Coke". However, consumer backlash led to the company reintroducing the original formula as "Coca-Cola Classic" on July 11, 1985. Some analysts have speculated that the decision to replace the original flavor was actually a strategy to boost Coke sales once it came back on the market, which it did; however, the Coca-Cola Company denies the claim.

==== "Pepsi Stuff" ====
In the mid-1990s, Pepsi launched its Pepsi Stuff campaign. Using the slogan "Drink Pepsi, Get Stuff", consumers could collect Pepsi Points on packages and cups which could be redeemed for free Pepsi merchandise. The program was later expanded to include Mountain Dew and Pepsi's international markets worldwide. The company continued to run the program for many years, with periodic updates with new features. This line of commercials led to the court case Leonard v. Pepsico, Inc., which was chronicled in the 2022 Netflix show Pepsi, Where's My Jet?

=== Super Bowl LIII ===
Super Bowl LIII in 2019 was played in Atlanta, Georgia, which is where Coca-Cola's head office is located. Pepsi had been a sponsor of the NFL for years, sponsoring the half time shows from 2013 to 2022. Pepsi advertising tied to the game referenced the game’s location with slogans such as "Pepsi in Atlanta. How Refreshing", "Hey Atlanta, Thanks For Hosting. We'll Bring The Drinks", and "Look Who's in Town for Super Bowl LIII". Both companies ran television ads during the Super Bowl, as Coca-Cola aired the commercial "A Coke is a Coke" just before the Super Bowl's National Anthem, while Pepsi ran a series of ads with the tagline "Is Pepsi OK?".

=== Celebrity branding ===
Both Coca-Cola and Pepsi engaged celebrity branding in the Cola wars, enlisting musicians as spokespeople. Coca-Cola hired Paula Abdul to represent them, while Pepsi hired Michael Jackson. Jackson contributed to Pepsi's public relations and advertising, suggesting that the company use his song "Billie Jean" as their jingle.

On January 27, 1984, Michael and other members of the Jacksons filmed a Pepsi commercial overseen by Phil Dusenberry, a BBDO ad agency executive, and Alan Pottasch, Pepsi's Worldwide Creative Director, at the Shrine Auditorium in Los Angeles. During a simulated concert, pyrotechnics accidentally set Jackson's hair on fire, causing second-degree burns to his scalp. Jackson underwent treatment to hide the scars and had his third rhinoplasty shortly thereafter. Pepsi settled out of court, and Jackson donated the $1.5 million (equivalent to $4.6 million in 2025) settlement to the Brotman Medical Center in Culver City, California; its now-closed Michael Jackson Burn Center was named in his honor.

== Comparison of products ==
Many of the brands available from the three largest soda producers, The Coca-Cola Company, PepsiCo and Keurig Dr Pepper, compete directly within similar categories of soft drinks. The following chart lists these competitors by type or flavor of drink.

Flavor/type	The Coca-Cola Company	PepsiCo	Keurig Dr Pepper
Cola	Coca-Cola	Pepsi	RC Cola; Schweppes Cola
Diet/sugar-free cola	Diet Coke/Coca-Cola Light; Coca-Cola Zero Sugar; Tab (discontinued); Coca-Cola Life (discontinued)	Diet Pepsi/Pepsi Light; Pepsi Zero Sugar/Pepsi Max; Pepsi One (discontinued); Pepsi Next (discontinued); Pepsi True (discontinued)	Diet Rite (discontinued); Diet RC; RC Zero Sugar
Caffeine-free cola	Caffeine-Free Coca-Cola	Caffeine-Free Pepsi	RC 100
Cherry-flavored cola	Coca-Cola Cherry	Pepsi Wild Cherry	Cherry RC
Pepper-style	Mr. Pibb	Dr. Slice (discontinued)	Dr Pepper
Orange	Fanta; Minute Maid; Simply Orange; Royal Tru Orange	Mirinda; Tropicana Twister; Tango; Slice; Crush (in the U.S. and Canada)	Crush (in countries other than the U.S. and Canada); Sunkist
Lemon-lime	Sprite; Limca (only in India, excluding imports)	Starry; Teem (discontinued); Slice (discontinued); Sierra Mist (discontinued); 7 Up (in countries other than the U.S.)	7 Up (in the U.S.)
Citrus	Mello Yello; Surge (discontinued); Vault (discontinued)	Mountain Dew	Sun Drop
Grapefruit and other citrus flavors	Fresca; L&P (New Zealand only); Lift; Lilt (discontinued) Fanta Portello (Sri Lanka only)	Kas; Izze; Citrus Blast	Squirt; Wink
Ginger ale	Seagram's Ginger Ale; Schweppes (manufactured by Keurig Dr Pepper; distributed by Coca-Cola in countries other than the U.S.)	Schweppes (manufactured by Keurig Dr Pepper; distributed by PepsiCo in the U.S.)	Canada Dry; Vernors
Root beer	Barq's; Ramblin' Root Beer (until 1995)	Mug Root Beer	A&W Root Beer; Stewart's Root Beer; Hires Root Beer
Cream soda	Barq's Red Creme Soda	Mug Cream Soda	A&W Cream Soda; Stewart's Cream Soda
Juices	Minute Maid; Fruitopia (discontinued in the U.S.); Simply Orange	Tropicana; Dole (prepackaged only, under license)	Mott's; Nantucket Nectars; Snapple
Iced tea	Nestea (manufactured by Nestlé in the U.S. and by a joint venture between Nestlé and Coca-Cola elsewhere); Gold Peak Tea; Fuze; Peace Tea	Lipton; Brisk; Pure Leaf (ready-to-drink products only, under license from Unilever)	Snapple
Sports drinks	Powerade; Aquarius; Vitamin Water	Gatorade; Propel	All Sport
Energy drinks	Coca-Cola Energy (discontinued); Full Throttle; NOS; Relentless; Burn; Monster Energy (manufactured by Monster Beverage, co-owned by and distributed by Coca-Cola)	AMP; Rockstar; Sting; Mountain Dew Kickstart	Venom; Xyience; Adrenaline Shoc
Bottled water	Dasani; Kinley; Glaceau Smartwater; Ades	Aquafina; LIFEWTR	Dejà Blue
Sparkling water	Aha	Bubly	Limitless

== In popular culture ==
It was announced in September 2024 that Judd Apatow would be directing a film based on the cola wars for Sony Pictures Motion Picture Group, with Steven Spielberg as producer.

== See also ==
- Browser wars
- Burger wars
- Chicken sandwich wars
- Coffee wars
- Console wars
- Format wars
- Smartphone wars
- Tar derby
