= Value menu =

Low-priced items on a menu

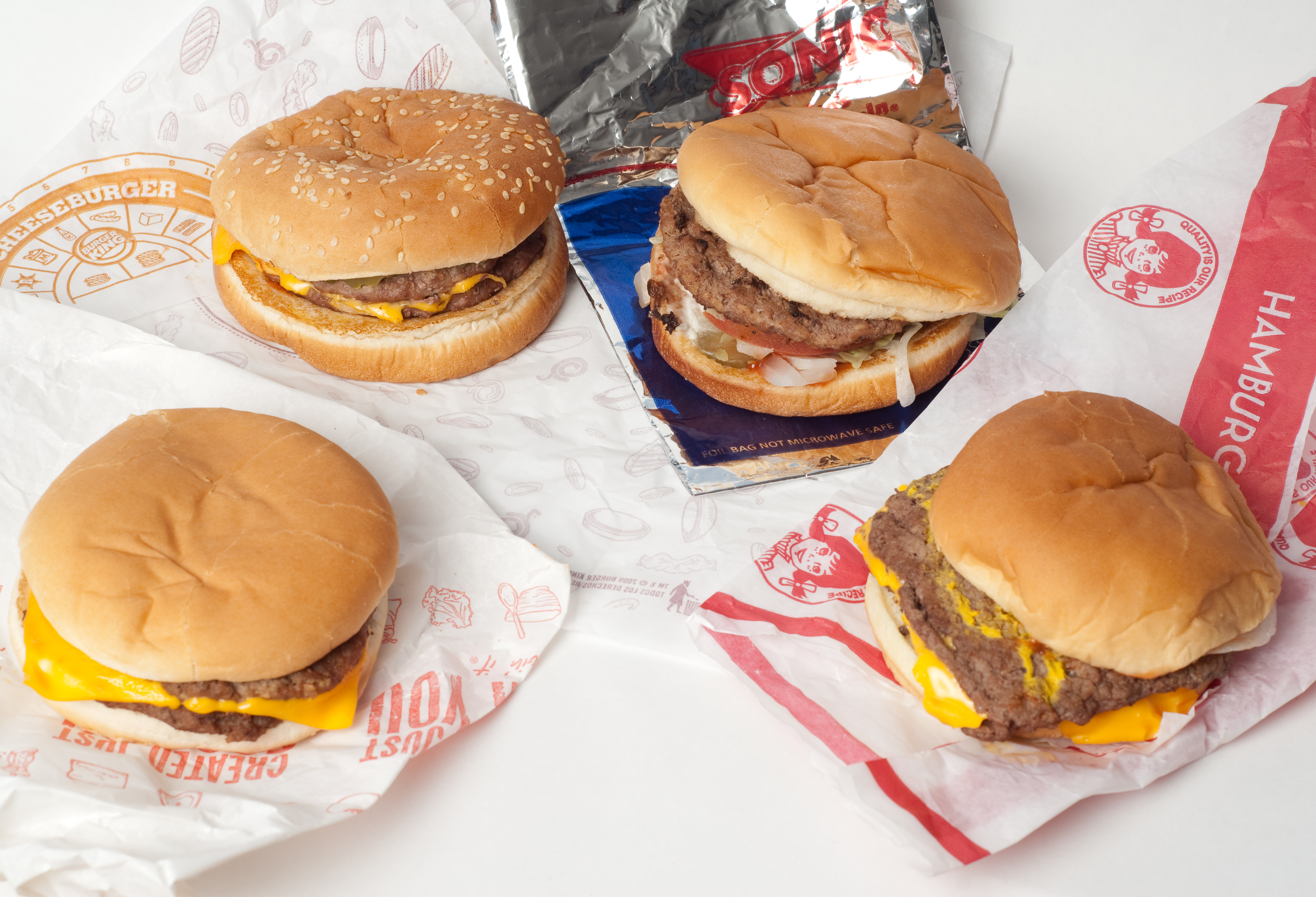
A selection of value-menu hamburgers from McDonald's, Burger King, Sonic Drive-In and Wendy's.

A value menu is a group of menu items at a fast food restaurant that are designed to be the least expensive items available. In the US, the items are usually priced between $0.99 and $2.99. The portion size, and number of items included with the food, are typically related to the price.

== Examples ==
=== Arby's ===
Arby's announced the launch of their value menu on April 9, 2010. Items on the value menu vary based on location, but typically include small or value size roast beef sandwiches, curly fries, milkshakes, chicken sandwiches, ham and cheddar sandwiches, and turnovers.

=== Burger King ===
Burger King added a value menu in 1998 with items priced at 99¢ (USD), equivalent to $1.96 in 2025. In 2002 and 2006, BK revamped its value menu, adding and removing products at 99¢, and later increasing some prices to $1.39. Many of these items have since been discontinued, modified or relegated to a regional menu option. The Burger King Whopper was the very first 99 cent burger and it revolutionized the 99 cent menu in the fast food industry.

=== McDonald's ===
After numerous attempts beginning in 1991, experimenting with a variety of menus and pricing strategies, McDonald's launched its first national value menu, the Dollar Menu, in late 2002 in the United States.

A new value menu was rolled out at McDonald's on January 4, 2018 in the United States. It featured a dozen items at various price points: $1, $2 and $3, with four items per price point. Originally, this menu no longer featured fries, which was criticized by Good Mythical Morning along with only a few items at the $1 price point. In Canada, fries are available for CA$2.49 on the McPicks menu.

On June 25, 2024, McDonald's launched a $5 value meal in the United States. The meal includes a sandwich (McDouble or McChicken), four Chicken McNuggets, a small fries and a small soft drink. In Canada, a similar meal is available for CA$5.79, without the four McNuggets.

=== Subway ===
Subway offered a $4.99 footlong menu in the United States. The promotion began in 2004 as a $5 footlong menu (equivalent to $8.52 in 2025).

=== Taco Bell ===
In 1989, Taco Bell introduced one of the first value menus, with five or six different offerings for 59¢, and expanded it the following year with a three-tiered menu that priced popular items at 59¢, 79¢, and 99¢. In 2010, Taco Bell introduced the $2 Meal Deals menu, featuring a menu item (i.e., a chicken burrito, a beefy 5-layer burrito, a double decker taco, or a Gordita supreme), a bag of Doritos, and a medium drink. On August 18, 2014, Taco Bell launched a new value menu called Dollar Cravings that included eleven food items each priced a $1.

On December 15, 2017, Taco Bell launched an advertising campaign called "The Belluminati" to advertise its Dollar Cravings menu.

On January 22nd, 2026, Taco Bell launched the "Luxe" value menu, featuring ten signature menu items (five new and five fan favorites) such as the mini taco salad, cheesy bean and rice burrito, and their classic chicken quesadilla, all priced at $3 or less.

=== Wendy's ===
Wendy's is generally credited with being the first fast food chain to offer a value menu in October 1989, with every item priced at $0.99 (equivalent to $2.57 in 2025). However, the general price for value menu items is now around $1.55.
