= Burger wars =

Series of fast food advertising campaigns

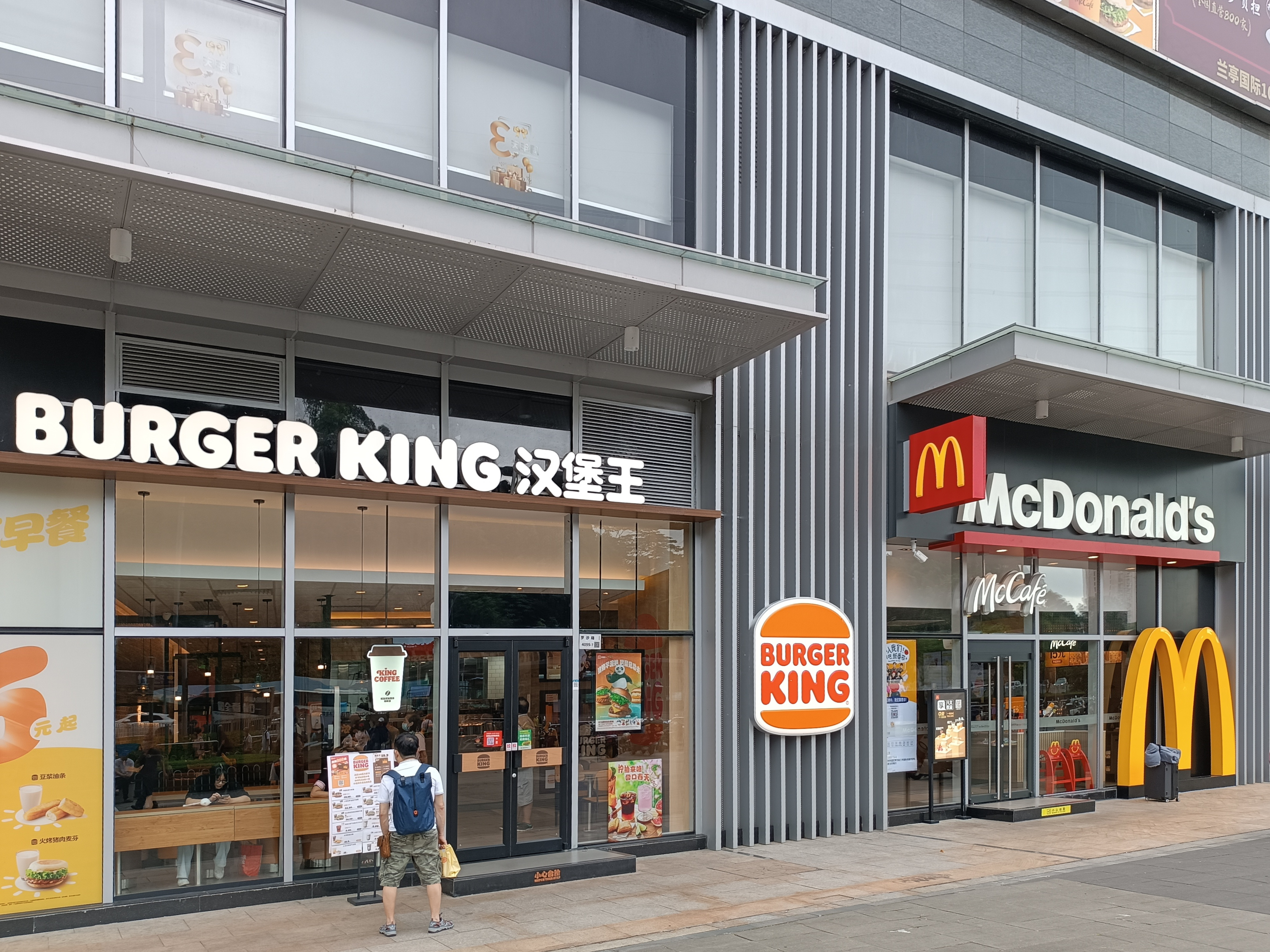
Adjacent branches of Burger King and McDonald's in Lanting Guoji Mingyuan, Shenzhen. The two chains are widely considered to be the main competitors of the Burger Wars.

The Burger wars are a series of off-and-on comparative advertising campaigns consisting of mutually-targeted advertisements that highlight the intense competition between hamburger fast food chains McDonald's, Burger King, Wendy's and others in the United States. The term first came into use during the late 1970s due to an attempt by Burger King to generate increased market and mind-share by attacking the size of bigger rival McDonald's hamburgers.

By the mid-1980s, the constant spending on advertising began to affect the major players. In 1987, Burger King laid off more than a hundred people from its corporate headquarters in Miami, Florida, while Dublin, Ohio-based Wendy's reported its first quarterly operating loss since its founding in 1969. Conversely, McDonald's operating revenue and profit increased while its market share also grew. Smaller chains, such as Hardee's, worked to keep from getting caught up in the extensive financial brinkmanship by avoiding the expensive ad campaigns and by staying in smaller, more geographically limited locations.

The New York Times states that the poor economy of the Great Recession led to the return of the Burger Wars. Because of tightened budgets, consumers have been forced to seek value and the major fast food chains are in increasing competition for consumer dollars. The Wendy's chain has been at the forefront of the revival, airing a series of ads that feature founder Dave Thomas's daughter Melinda Lou Morse, the original "Wendy", advertising a series of new burgers and reviving its Where's the beef? advertising slogan. A March 2014 report in USA Today noted that Burger King is reviving the Burger Wars, including introducing clones of the Big Mac and McRib sandwiches, in response to business declines at McDonald's.

== Modern examples ==
In a 2007 advertising campaign, Jack in the Box aired a series of television ads in the United States that disparaged several rivals' Angus-beef burgers in which it was alleged that they equated Angus beef with an anus. Rival chain operator CKE claimed the ads were misleading because they confuse consumers by comparing sirloin, a cut of meat found on all cattle, with Angus, which is a breed of cattle. CKE, operator of the Carl's Jr. and Hardee's chains, had been noted for running controversial ads and claimed that there was no comparison between the ads they were running and those of Jack In the Box because their ads did not insinuate their products came from an undesirable part of cows.

Because of their similar preparation styles and menus, the expansion of Five Guys into the territories of its Los Angeles-based counterpart In-N-Out has been described as a newer version of the Burger Wars by several publications.

=== Breakfast Wars ===
The entry of Taco Bell into the breakfast fast-food business in 2014 for its United States locations triggered a related phenomenon known as the "Breakfast Wars", particularly between Taco Bell and McDonald's. Taco Bell rolled-out its breakfast menu by soliciting testimonials from people named Ronald McDonald, a move to which McDonald's responded by providing free coffee for a two-week period. Similarly, McDonald's Canada recently began offering free coffee for a week during Tim Hortons' "Roll Up the Rim to Win" campaign. Taco Bell's new value menu Dollar Cravings was instigated in reaction to McDonald's and Wendy's value menus.

=== Burger King's McWhopper proposal ===
On August 26, 2015, Burger King released an open letter to McDonald's proposing a joint promotion for Peace Day called the "McWhopper", a combination of the two restaurants' signature burgers. The overture was rejected by McDonald's, a response that drew mostly criticism for its tone and the sense of a missed opportunity. Despite the missed opportunity, President Barack Obama declared it a breaking point in the "Fight for $15" movement, reportedly saying that the "McWhopper" was an example of how American fast food corporations can learn to unite for a common cause, and he hoped it could be further utilized as a springboard in raising the minimum wage for uneducated fast food workers. McDonald's later released a commercial directed by comic filmmaker Mel Brooks to much critical acclaim, showcasing the charitable efforts of characters Ronald McDonald and the Hamburglar along with the promised effort to renew the "Fight for $15".

On September 1, 2015, Burger King announced that they had been approached by representatives from Denny's, Wayback Burgers, Krystal, and Giraffas about partnering on a similar project. Burger King then announced the "Peace Day Burger", which would feature ingredients from all five restaurants' burgers.

== See also ==
- Browser wars
- Chicken sandwich wars
- Coffee wars — sales and marketing tactics initiated by coffeehouse chains
- Cola wars — similar type of competitive advertising programs between Coca-Cola and Pepsi.
- Console wars
- Fast food advertising
- Format war
- Smartphone wars
- Tar derby
