= History of tobacco =

Tobacco was long used by various indigenous groups that lived in the Americas. The Columbian exchange introduced tobacco to the Europeans, and it became an addictive, lucrative and heavily traded commodity. Following the Industrial Revolution, cigarettes became hugely popular worldwide. In the mid-20th century, medical research demonstrated severe negative health effects of tobacco smoking such as lung cancer, which led to governments adopting policies to force a sharp decline in tobacco use.

== Early history ==
=== Pre-Columbian Americas ===
The tobacco plant, first used by the native people of the Americas, later came into use in Europe and in the rest of the world. Archaeological finds indicate that humans in the Americas began using tobacco as far back as 12,300 years ago, thousands of years earlier than previously documented.

Tobacco had already long been used in the Americas by the time European visitors arrived and took the practice across the Atlantic, where it became popular. Eastern North American tribes have historically carried tobacco in pouches as a readily accepted trade item, as well as smoking it in pipe ceremonies, whether for sacred ceremonies or those to seal a treaty or agreement.

In addition to use in spiritual and religious ceremonies, tobacco is also used in indigenous traditional-medicine systems for the treatment of physical conditions. As a pain killer it has been used for earache and toothache and occasionally as a poultice. Some indigenous peoples in California have used tobacco as the base ingredient in smoking mixtures used for treating colds; usually it is mixed with other traditional medicinals such as Salvia dorrii or Lomatium dissectum (the addition of which was thought to be particularly good for asthma and tuberculosis). Tobacco was also heavily cultivated in the Chesapeake Colonies area from the 1620s on, where it was sometimes used as a form of currency.

According to Iroquois mythology, tobacco first grew out of Atahensic's head after she died giving birth to her twin sons, Sapling and Flint.

Religious use of tobacco is still common to this day amongst many indigenous peoples, particularly in the Americas. Among the Cree and Ojibwe of Canada and the north-central United States, it is offered to the Creator, with prayers, and is used in sweat lodges and pipe ceremonies, and presented as a gift. A gift of tobacco is traditional when asking an Ojibwe elder a question of a spiritual nature.

=== European usage ===
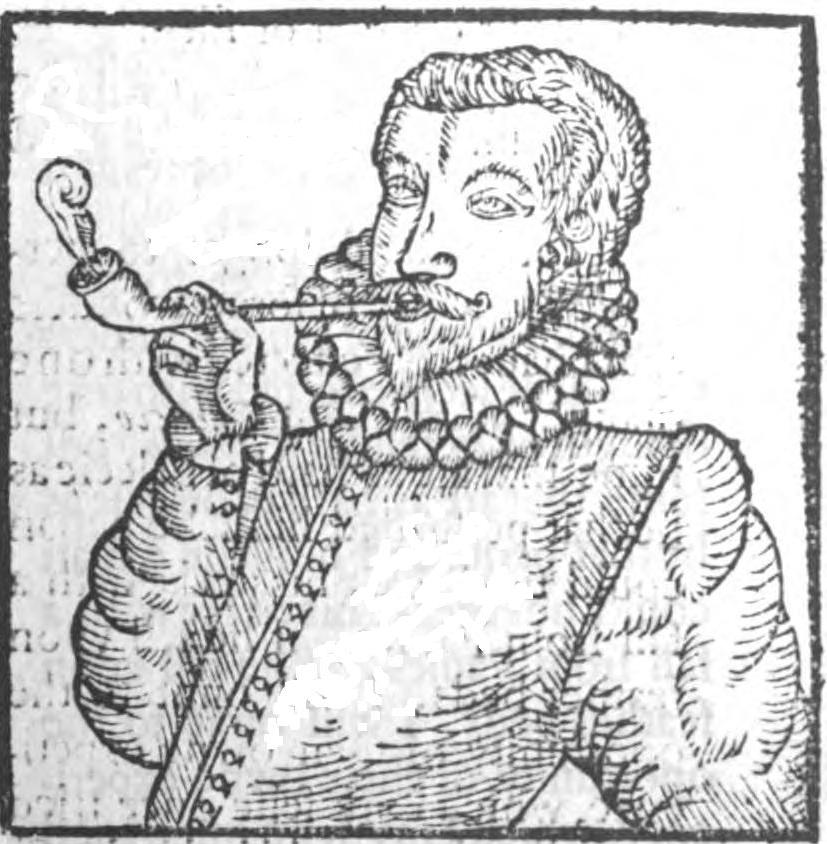
The earliest image of a man smoking a pipe, from Tabaco by Anthony Chute

Tobacco was completely unfamiliar to Europeans before the discovery of the New World. Bartolomé de las Casas described how the first scouts sent by Christopher Columbus into the interior of Cuba found:

men with half-burned wood in their hands and certain herbs to take their smokes, which are some dry herbs put in a certain leaf, also dry, like those the boys make on the day of the Passover of the Holy Ghost; and having lighted one part of it, by the other they suck, absorb, or receive that smoke inside with the breath, by which they become benumbed and almost drunk, and so it is said they do not feel fatigue. These, muskets as we will call them, they call tabacos. I knew Spaniards on this island of Española who were accustomed to take it, and being reprimanded for it, by telling them it was a vice, they replied they were unable to cease using it. I do not know what relish or benefit they found in it.

Following the arrival of Europeans, tobacco became one of the primary products fueling colonization, and also became a driving factor in the introduction of African slave labour. The Spanish introduced tobacco to Europeans in about 1528, and by 1533, Diego Columbus mentioned a tobacco merchant of Lisbon in his will, showing how quickly the traffic had sprung up. The French, Spanish, and Portuguese initially referred to the plant as the "sacred herb" because of perceived valuable medicinal properties.

Jean Nicot, French ambassador in Lisbon, sent samples to Paris in 1559. Nicot sent leaves and seeds to Francis II and the King's mother, Catherine of Medici, with instructions to use tobacco as snuff. The king's recurring headaches (perhaps caused by frequent sinus infections) were reportedly "marvellously cured" by snuff. (Francis II nevertheless died at sixteen years of age on 5 December 1560, after a reign of less than two years). Despite this setback, French cultivation of herbe de la Reine (the queen's herb) began in 1560. By 1570 botanists referred to tobacco as Nicotiana, although André Thevet claimed that he, not Nicot, had introduced tobacco to France; historians believe this unlikely, but that Thevet was the first Frenchman to write about the drug.

Swiss doctor Conrad Gesner in 1563 reported that chewing or smoking a tobacco leaf "has a wonderful power of producing a kind of peaceful drunkenness". In 1571, Spanish doctor Nicolas Monardes wrote a textbook about herbalism. In this work, he claimed that tobacco could cure 36 health problems, and reported that the plant was first brought to Spain for its flowers, but "Now we use it to a greater extent for the sake of its virtues than for its beauty".

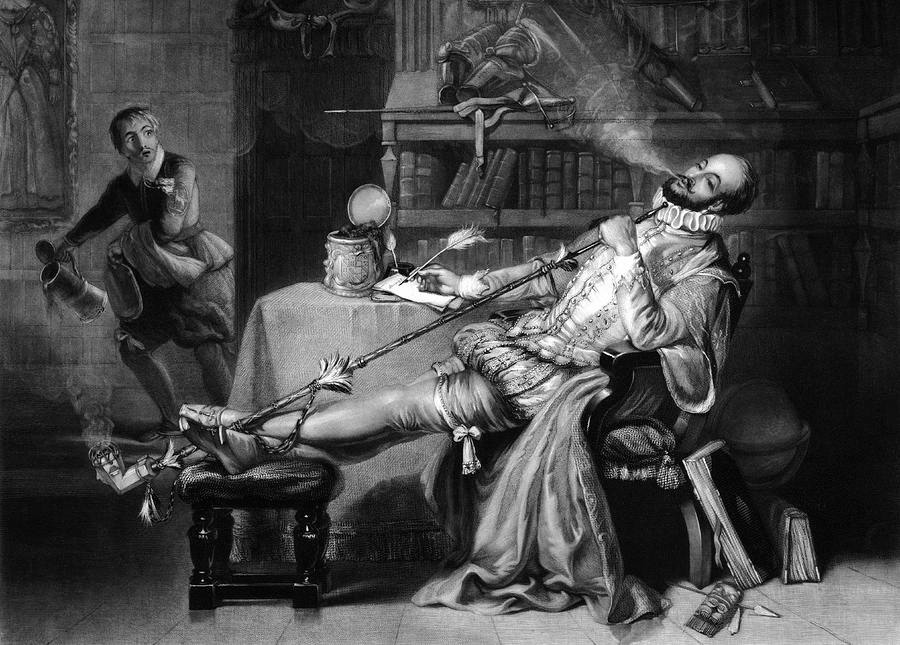
Sir Walter Raleigh introduced Virginia tobacco into England. "Raleigh's First Pipe in England", included in Frederick William Fairholt's Tobacco, its history and associations.

John Hawkins was the first to bring tobacco seeds to England. William Harrison's English Chronology mentions tobacco smoking in the country as of 1573, before Sir Walter Raleigh brought the first "Virginia" tobacco to Europe from the Roanoke Colony, referring to it as tobah as early as 1578. In 1595 Anthony Chute published Tabaco, which emphasised the purported healthfulness of the plant. A popular song of the early 1600s by Tobias Hume proclaimed that "Tobacco is Like Love".

The importation of tobacco into England was not without resistance and controversy. Stuart King James I wrote a famous polemic titled A Counterblaste to Tobacco in 1604, in which the king denounced tobacco use as "[a] custome lothsome to the eye, hatefull to the Nose, harmefull to the braine, dangerous to the Lungs, and in the blacke stinking fume thereof, neerest resembling the horrible Stigian smoke of the pit that is bottomelesse." That year, an English statute was enacted that placed a heavy protective tariff on tobacco imports. The duty rose from 2p per pound to 6s 10p, a 40-fold increase, but English demand remained strong despite the high price; Barnabee Rych reported that 7,000 stores in London sold tobacco and calculated that at least 319,375 pounds sterling were spent on tobacco annually. Because the Virginia and Bermuda colonies' economies were affected by the high duty, James in 1624 instead created a royal monopoly. No tobacco could be imported except from Virginia, and a royal license that cost 15 pounds per year was required to sell it (equivalent to £3,300 in 2025). To help the colonies, Charles II banned tobacco cultivation in England, but allowed it to be grown in herb gardens for medicinal purposes.

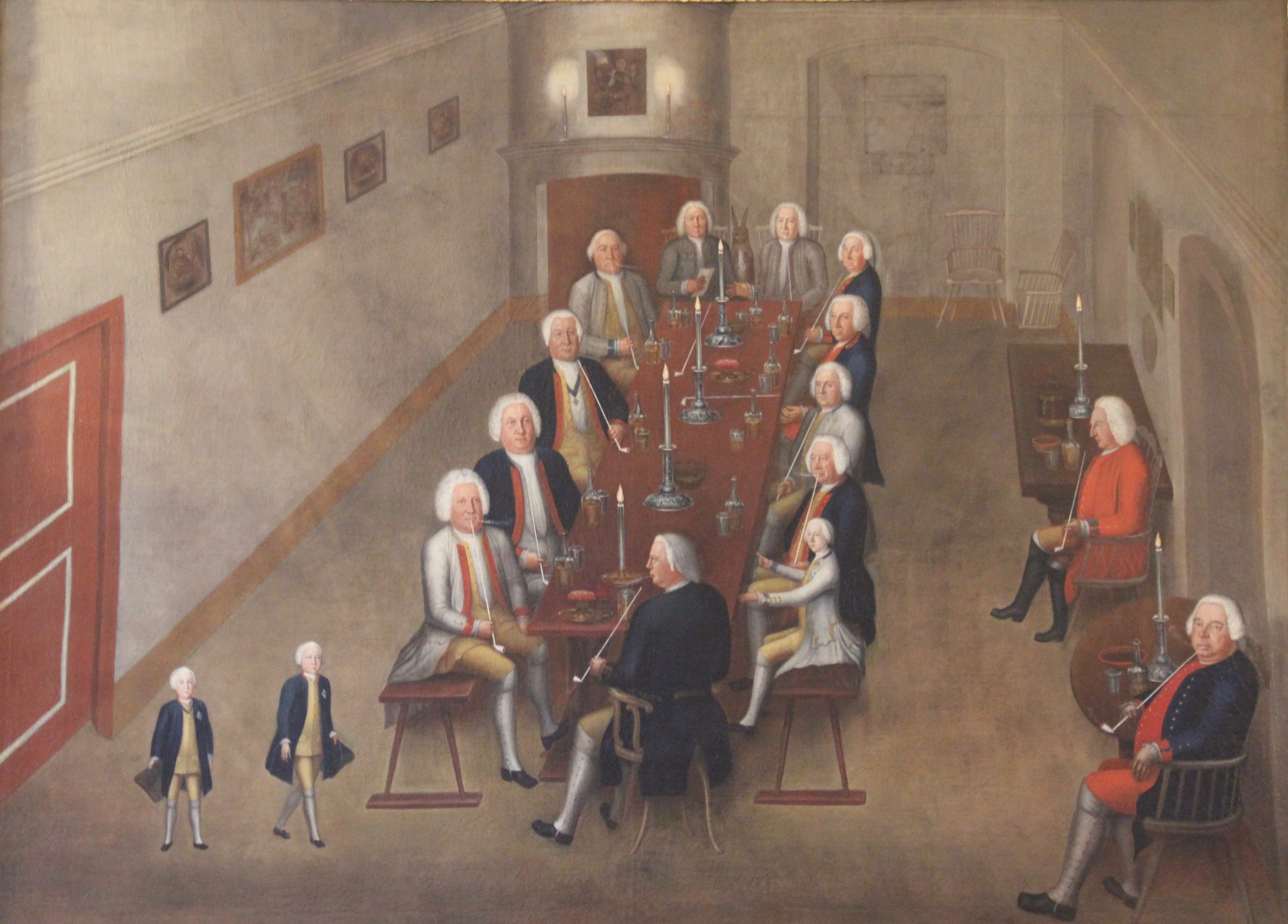
The Tabakskollegium (tobacco society) of Frederick William I of Prussia (1737)

Tobacco was introduced elsewhere in continental Europe more easily. Iberia exported "ropes" of dry leaves in baskets to the Netherlands and southern Germany; for a while tobacco was in Spanish called canaster after the word for basket (canastro), and influenced the German Knaster. In Italy, Prospero Santacroce in 1561 and Nicolo Torbabuoni in 1570 introduced it to gardens after seeing the plant on diplomatic missions. Cardinal Crescenzio introduced smoking to the country in about 1610 after learning about it in England. The Roman Catholic Church did not condemn tobacco as James I did, but Pope Urban VIII threatened excommunication for anyone caught smoking in a church.

In Russia, tobacco use was banned in 1634 except for foreigners in Moscow. Peter the Great—who in England had learned of smoking and the royal monopoly—became the monarch in 1689, however. Revoking all bans, he licensed the Muscovy Company to import 1.5 million pounds (680 t) of tobacco per year, with the Russian Crown receiving 28,000 pounds sterling annually.

=== Asia ===
The Japanese were introduced to tobacco by Portuguese sailors in 1542. Tobacco first arrived in the Ottoman Empire in the late 16th century by the Spanish, where it attracted the attention of doctors and became a commonly prescribed medicine for many ailments. Although tobacco was initially prescribed as medicine, further study led to claims that smoking caused dizziness, fatigue, dulling of the senses, and a foul taste/odour in the mouth.

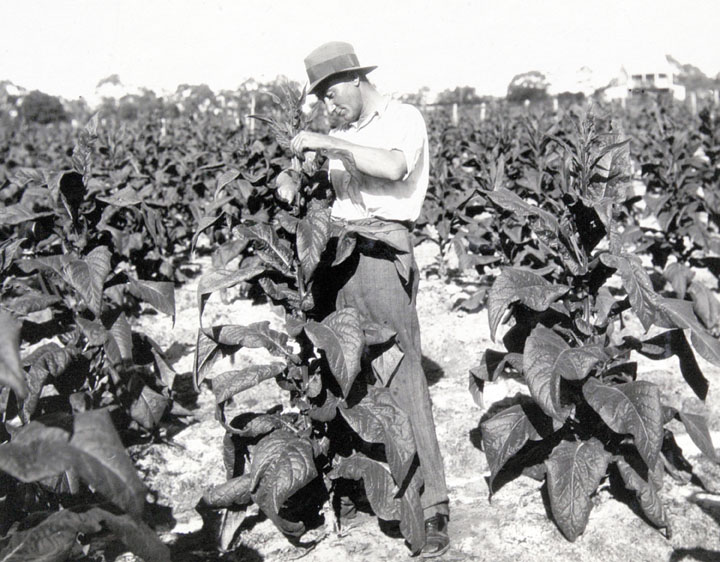
A tobacco plantation in Queensland, in 1933

Sultan Murad IV banned smoking in the Ottoman Empire in 1633. When the ban was lifted by his successor, Ibrahim the Mad, it was instead taxed. In 1682, Damascene jurist Abd al-Ghani al-Nabulsi declared: "Tobacco has now become extremely famous in all the countries of Islam ... People of all kinds have used it and devoted themselves to it ... I have even seen young children of about five years applying themselves to it." In 1750, a Damascene townsmen observed "a number of women greater than the men, sitting along the bank of the Barada River. They were eating and drinking, and drinking coffee and smoking tobacco just as the men were doing."

Tabacco had reached Java by the end of the 17th century cultivated and consumed among the Javanese in a crude wrapped form or bungkus, as witnessed and recorded by Dutch East India Company mercenaries.

=== Australia ===
Although Nicotiana suaveolens is native to Australia, tobacco smoking first reached that continent's shores when it was introduced to northern-dwelling Indigenous communities by visiting Indonesian fishermen in the early 18th century. British patterns of tobacco use were transported to Australia along with the new settlers in 1788; and in the years following colonisation, British smoking behaviour was rapidly adopted by Indigenous people as well. By the early 19th century tobacco was an essential commodity routinely issued to servants, prisoners and ticket-of-leave men (conditionally released convicts) as an inducement to work, or conversely, withheld as a means of punishment.

=== America ===
In colonial Brazil, especially in the Captaincy of Bahia, tobacco became established as a commodity transported in the Atlantic trade between the 17th and 18th centuries, circulating in networks that connected the colony to Africa and Europe. Its commercialization was directly associated with the Atlantic slave trade of enslaved Africans, being widely used as a commodity in trade relations between captaincies such as Bahia and Pernambuco and Costa da Mina in West Africa, where tobacco, in addition to gold and other enslaved people, constituted one of the central elements of these exchanges. Thus, tobacco production, like other agricultural activities outside of export, was predominantly based on enslaved African labor and was part of the set of strategic products of the colonial economy, subject to control and oversight mechanisms by the Portuguese administration.

In Spanish America, tobacco also circulated through formal and illicit trade networks, notably the exchange between Hispaniola, Tierra Firme, and other points in the Caribbean and Spanish America under strict imperial trade regulations.

==== Economic history in the American colonies ====
In the Thirteen Colonies, where gold and silver were scarce, tobacco was used as a currency to trade with Native Americans, and sometimes for official purposes such as paying fines, taxes, and even marriage license fees.

The demand and profitability of tobacco led to the shift in the colonies to a slave-based labor force, fueling the Atlantic slave trade. Tobacco is a labor-intensive crop, requiring much work for its cultivation, harvest, and curing. With the profitability of the land rapidly increasing, it was no longer economically viable to bring in indentured servants with the promise of land benefits at the end of their tenure. By bringing African slaves instead, plantation owners acquired workers for long hours in the hot sun without paying them, providing only a bare subsistence.

The uncultivated Virginia soil was reportedly too rich for traditional European crops, especially barley. Tobacco "broke down the fields and made food crops more productive" by depleting the soil of nutrients.

==== Tobacco's impact on early American history ====
The cultivation of tobacco in America led to many changes. During the 1700s tobacco was a very lucrative crop due to its high demand in Europe. The climate of the Chesapeake area in America lent itself very nicely to the cultivation of tobacco. The high European demand for tobacco led to a rise in the value of tobacco. The rise of value of tobacco accelerated the economic growth in America. The cultivation of tobacco as a cash crop in America marks the shift from a subsistence economy to an agrarian economy. Tobacco's desirability and value led to it being used as a currency in colonies. Tobacco was also backed by the gold standard, with an established conversion rate from tobacco to gold.

The increasing role of tobacco as a cash crop led to a shift in the labor force that would shape life and politics in the American South up through the civil war. In order to maximize profits, tobacco plantation owners abandoned the traditional practice of indentured servitude in the Americas and turned instead to the Atlantic slave trade to supply them with cheap, fungible labor, allowing them to increase their yield while reducing costs.

==== Early cultivation of tobacco ====
In the first few years of tobacco cultivation in the colonies, the plants were simply covered with hay and left in the field to cure or "sweat." This method was abandoned after 1618, when regulations prohibited the use of valuable potential animal food for such purposes. It was also abandoned because a better method of curing tobacco had been developed. In this new method the wilted leaves were hung on lines or sticks, at first outside on fence rails. Tobacco barns for housing the crop were in use by the 1620s.

During the curing period, which lasted about four to six weeks, the color of the tobacco changed from a greenish yellow to a light tan. Mold was an immense danger during this time. Once again, a planter relied on his experience to know when the tobacco was ready to be removed from the sticks on which it hung, a process known as "striking."

At last, when the tobacco was ready, and preferably during a period of damp weather, workers struck the tobacco and laid the leaves on the floor of the tobacco barn to sweat for somewhere between a week or two. Logs could be used to press the tobacco and increase its temperature, but with that there came a danger. The heat might become too intense and mold spoil the crop.

After sweating, the next step was sorting. Ideally, all the tobacco should be in a condition described by cropmasters as "in case". This meant that the tobacco had absorbed just the right amount of moisture; it could be stretched like leather, and was glossy and moist. If tobacco were too damp, it would rot in transit; if too dry, it would crumble and be unsalable.

In the early years at Jamestown the settlers paid little heed to quality control; this attitude soon changed due to both the market and to regulations. Over time, the settlers began to separate the tobacco into sections of equal quality. The leaves were then tied together in hands, which were bunches of five to fourteen. The hands were returned to platforms to sweat. When they were once again "in case", the inspection of the crop could take place and the final processing for export begin.

Early on, the preparation of tobacco for shipping was very simple. The tobacco leaves were twisted and rolled, then spun into rope, which was wound into balls weighing as much as a hundred pounds (45 kilograms). These balls were protected in canvas or barrels, which would then be shipped to Europe. Although the export of bulk tobacco was not outlawed until 1730, a large barrel called a "hogshead" soon became the favored container throughout the colonial period. Even though its capacity varied slightly, governed by the regulations of the day, the average weight of the tobacco stored in a hogshead barrel was about a thousand pounds (450 kilograms).

These barrels were transported in a variety of ways to the ships on which they would be carried to England. At first, captains of merchant vessels simply traveled from one plantation dock to the next, loading up with barrels of tobacco as they moved along the river. Other ways included employing northern smugglers to ferry tobacco to England.

==== Plantations in the American South ====
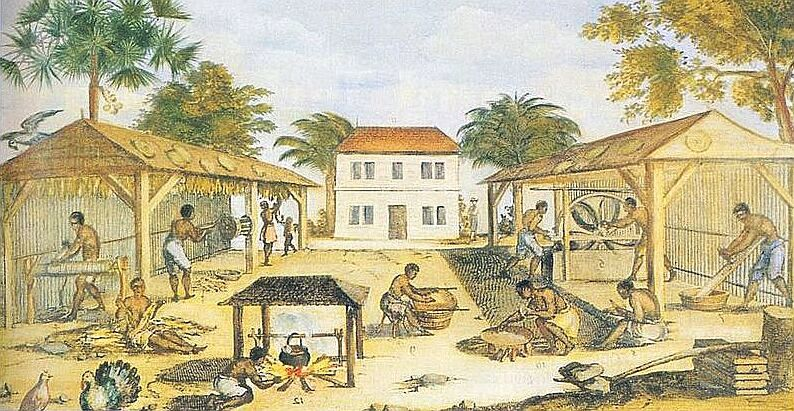
This 1670 painting shows enslaved Africans working in the tobacco sheds of a colonial tobacco plantation.

In 1609, English colonist John Rolfe arrived at Jamestown, Virginia, and became the first settler to successfully raise tobacco (commonly referred to at that time as "brown gold") for commercial use. Tobacco was used as money by the Virginia settlers for years, and Rolfe was able to make his fortune in farming it for export at Varina Farms Plantation.

When he left for England with his wife Matoaka (Pocahontas), a daughter of Chief Powhatan, he had become wealthy. Returning to Jamestown following Pocahontas' death in England, Rolfe continued in his efforts to improve the quality of commercial tobacco, and, by 1620 the colony shipped 40,000 pounds (18,000 kg) of tobacco to England. By the time John Rolfe died in 1622, Jamestown was thriving as a producer of tobacco, and its population had topped 4,000. Tobacco-farming led to the importation of the colony's first Black slaves in 1619.

Throughout the 17th and 18th centuries, tobacco continued to be the cash crop of the Virginia Colony, as well as The Carolinas. Large tobacco warehouses filled the areas near the wharves of new, thriving towns such as Dumfries on the Potomac, Richmond and Manchester at the Fall Line (head of navigation) on the James, and Petersburg on the Appomattox.

There were also tobacco plantations in Tennessee, like Wessyngton in Cedar Hill, Tennessee.

== 19th century ==
The 19th century witnessed several significant trends in the history of tobacco, as it became increasingly popular and its consumption spread across the world. Here are eight main trends that shaped the history of tobacco during that time:

- Global Spread: Tobacco cultivation and consumption expanded rapidly, reaching various parts of the world through trade and colonization. This led to a global increase in tobacco usage and production.
- Commercialization and Mass Production: Technological advancements, particularly the introduction of steam-powered machinery, allowed for large-scale commercial production of tobacco products, making them more accessible and affordable.
- Health Concerns: Early awareness of the potential health risks associated with tobacco consumption emerged during the late 19th century. A few medical professionals began expressing concerns about the impact of smoking on health. Nevertheless, tobacco usage increased steadily.
- Social and Cultural Acceptance: Smoking became increasingly socially acceptable and integrated into various social settings. Smoking rooms and designated areas in public places and social gatherings became common.
- Tobacco Advertising and Marketing: As the tobacco industry grew, so did advertising and marketing efforts. Tobacco companies used various promotional strategies to attract consumers and create brand loyalty.
- Regulation and Taxation: Governments started imposing taxes on tobacco products, generating significant revenue for state coffers. Additionally, there were some early attempts to regulate tobacco, primarily driven by concerns over public health. Until 1883, tobacco excise tax accounted for one third of internal revenue collected by the United States government. Internal Revenue Service data for 1879–80 show total tobacco tax receipts of $38.9 million, out of total receipts of $116.8 million.
- Tobacco in Literature and Art: Tobacco use found its way into literature, art, and popular culture. It became a symbol of leisure, sophistication, and rebellion, which further contributed to its popularity.
- Anti-Tobacco Movements: As awareness of tobacco-related health issues increased, various anti-tobacco movements emerged, advocating for tobacco control and promoting abstinence from tobacco use.

These trends demonstrate the complex and evolving role of tobacco in the 19th century, setting the stage for further developments in the 20th century and beyond.

=== United States ===
A historian of the American South in the late 1860s reported on typical usage in the region where it was grown:

The chewing of tobacco was well-nigh universal. This habit had been widespread among the agricultural population of America both North and South before the war. Soldiers had found the quid a solace in the field and continued to revolve it in their mouths upon returning to their homes. Out of doors where his life was principally led the chewer spat upon his lands without offence to other men, and his homes and public buildings were supplied with spittoons. Brown and yellow parabolas were projected to right and left toward these receivers, but very often without the careful aim which made for clean living. Even the pews of fashionable churches were likely to contain these familiar conveniences.

James Bonsack, an avid craftsman, in 1881 created a machine that revolutionized cigarette production. The machine chopped the cured tobacco leaves, then dropped a certain amount of the tobacco into a long tube of paper, which the machine would then roll and push out the end where it would be sliced by the machine into individual cigarettes. This machine operated at thirteen times the speed of a human doing the same task. This caused an enormous growth in the tobacco industry that lasted until the late 20th century.

== Since 1900 ==
=== Dominance of cigarettes ===
Cigarette smoking became the dominant usage after 1910. The 1910–1930 era saw a gradual shift in cultural attitudes. More women began smoking, challenging traditional gender norms and sparking debates about the propriety of female smokers.

=== Health concerns ===
A lengthy study conducted in order to establish the strong association necessary for legislative action

Nazi Germany saw the first modern anti-smoking campaign, the National Socialist government condemning tobacco use, funding research against it while levying increasing sin taxes on tobacco products, and in 1941 banning tobacco in various public places as a health hazard. In the UK and the US, an increase in lung cancer rates was being picked up by the 1930s, but the cause for this increase remained debated and unclear. A true breakthrough came in 1948, when the British physiologist Richard Doll published the first major studies that proved that smoking could cause serious health damage. In 1950, he published research in the British Medical Journal that showed a close link between smoking and lung cancer. Four years later, in 1954 the British Doctors Study, a study of some 40 thousand doctors over 20 years, confirmed the suggestion, based on which the government issued advice that smoking and lung cancer rates were related. The British Doctors Study lasted till 2001, with result published every ten years and final results published in 2004 by Doll and Richard Peto. Much early research was also done by Dr. Ochsner. Reader's Digest magazine for many years published frequent anti-smoking articles. In 1964 the United States Surgeon General's Report on Smoking and Health likewise began suggesting the relationship between smoking and cancer, which confirmed its suggestions 20 years later in the 1980s. In the United States, The Family Smoking Prevention and Tobacco Control Act (Tobacco Control Act) became law in 2009. It gave the Food and Drug Administration (FDA) the authority to regulate the manufacture, distribution, and marketing of tobacco products to protect public health. Partial controls and regulatory measures eventually followed in much of the developed world, including partial advertising bans, minimum age of sale requirements, and basic health warnings on tobacco packaging. However, smoking prevalence and associated ill health continued to rise in the developed world in the first three decades following Richard Doll's discovery, with governments sometimes reluctant to curtail a habit seen as popular as a result – and increasingly organised disinformation efforts by the tobacco industry and their proxies. Realisation dawned gradually that the health effects of smoking and tobacco use were susceptible only to a multi-pronged policy response which combined positive health messages with medical assistance to cease tobacco use and effective marketing restrictions, as initially indicated in a 1962 overview by the British Royal College of Physicians and the 1964 report of the U.S. Surgeon General.

In the 1950s tobacco companies engaged in an advertising war surrounding the tar content in cigarettes that came to be known as the tar derby. The companies ran advertisements that emphasized how their products supposedly had lower tar and nicotine levels alongside improved filter technology. The tar derby ended in 1959 after the Federal Trade Commission (FTC) Chairman and several cigarette company presidents agreed to no longer include tar or nicotine levels in advertisements. In order to reduce the potential burden of disease, the World Health Organization (WHO) successfully rallied 168 countries to sign the Framework Convention on Tobacco Control in 2003. The convention is designed to push for effective legislation and its enforcement in all countries to reduce the harmful effects of tobacco.

== In science ==
Tobacco has been the subject of a great deal of biochemical research. The economic impact of Tobacco Mosaic disease was the impetus that led to the isolation of Tobacco mosaic virus, the first ever virus to be properly characterized by scientists; the fortunate coincidence that it is one of the simplest viruses and can self-assemble from purified nucleic acid and protein led, in turn, to the rapid advancement of the field of virology. The 1946 Nobel Prize in Chemistry was shared by Wendell Meredith Stanley for his 1935 work crystallizing the virus and showing that it remains active.

== See also ==
- Chewing tobacco
- Cigar
- Cigarette
- Snuff (tobacco)
- Tobacco pipe
- Tobacconist
