= OC&C Strategy Consultants =

British consulting firm

OC&C Strategy Consultants LLP

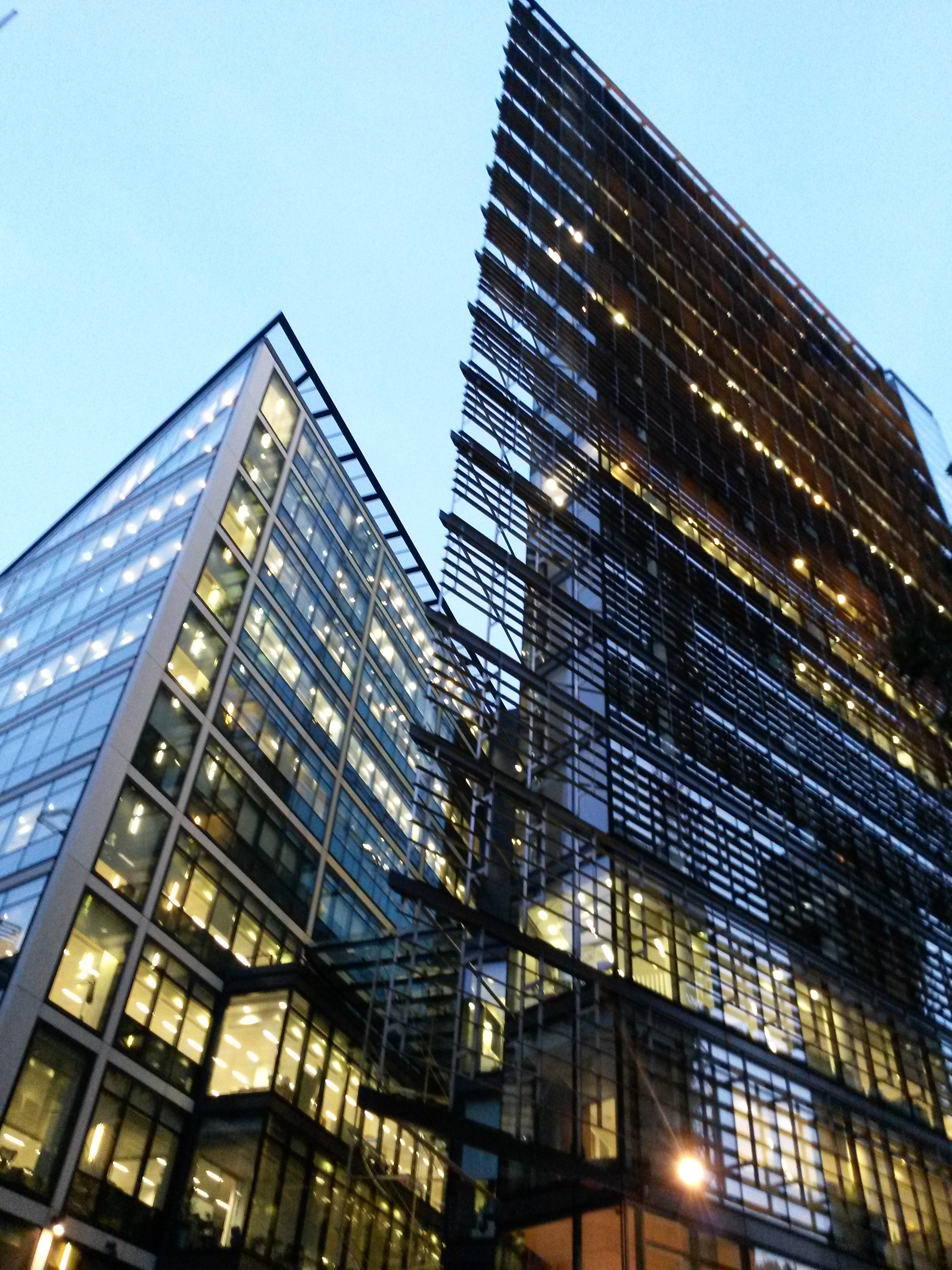
- Headquarters in London
- Type: Partnership
- Industry: Management consulting
- Founded: 1987; 39 years ago
- Founders: Chris Outram; Geoff Cullinan; Michael Jary
- Headquarters: London, United Kingdom
- Key people: Will Hayllar (Managing Partner)
- Number of employees: 700+ (2024)
- Website: www.occstrategy.com

OC&C Strategy Consultants LLP (OC&C) is a London-based global strategy-focused management consulting firm with offices in Australia, Brazil, China, France, Germany, Italy, the Netherlands, Poland, the U.K and the U.S.

== Background ==
OC&C was set up in London in 1987 by Chris Outram, Geoff Cullinan and Michael Jary, who were previously Booz Allen Hamilton consultants who specialized in consumer goods. The firm's first client was Schweppes Cola.

In June 2007, OC&C acquired Boston-based consulting firm Callidon Group to expand its presence in the US market. Callidon focused on media and publishing. In April 2012, OC&C expanded towards the east by partnering with Valuecom Partners in Warsaw. In 2013, OC&C announced its strategic partnership with Advisia in Brazil.

In the period between 2014 and 2015, Oliver Wyman acquired OC&C's businesses in Boston and China. This was a blow to OC&C which was seen as becoming an increasingly less global franchise.

In the period between 2016 and 2018, EY-Parthenon acquired the Benelux, French and German practices of OC&C. The company rebuilt its French office closing it briefly before relaunching in 2017 under a more global approach, and aimed to regain its presence in France.

In July 2019, OC&C acquired Italian consulting firm Long Term Partners (LTP).

From 2021 onwards, news surfaced that many former OC&C partners who went to EY-Parthenon wanted to return to their original firm. In 2021 it was noted that five partners and 40 consultants in the Netherlands returned to OC&C with similar activity occurring in France but on a smaller scale. In October 2024, seven partners with over 30 consultants and staff members returned to OC&C in Germany.

In March 2022, OC&C acquired Australian Strategy Partners to obtain a presence in Australia. The firm had a strong track record of performing due diligence for private equity clients.

In December 2023, OC&C was certified as a B Corporation.

== Business operations ==
The firm prides itself on operating across a few core specialisms. OC&C also provides services for private equity clients such as investment scoping and due diligence.

OC&C focuses on strategy rather than implementation.

OC&C also produces research reports on sectors. In 2008, it produced State of Retail 2008 which was the first sector-wide study of its kind into the profitability and dynamics of the retail industry.
