= Chicken sandwich =

Type of sandwich

Chicken Sandwich
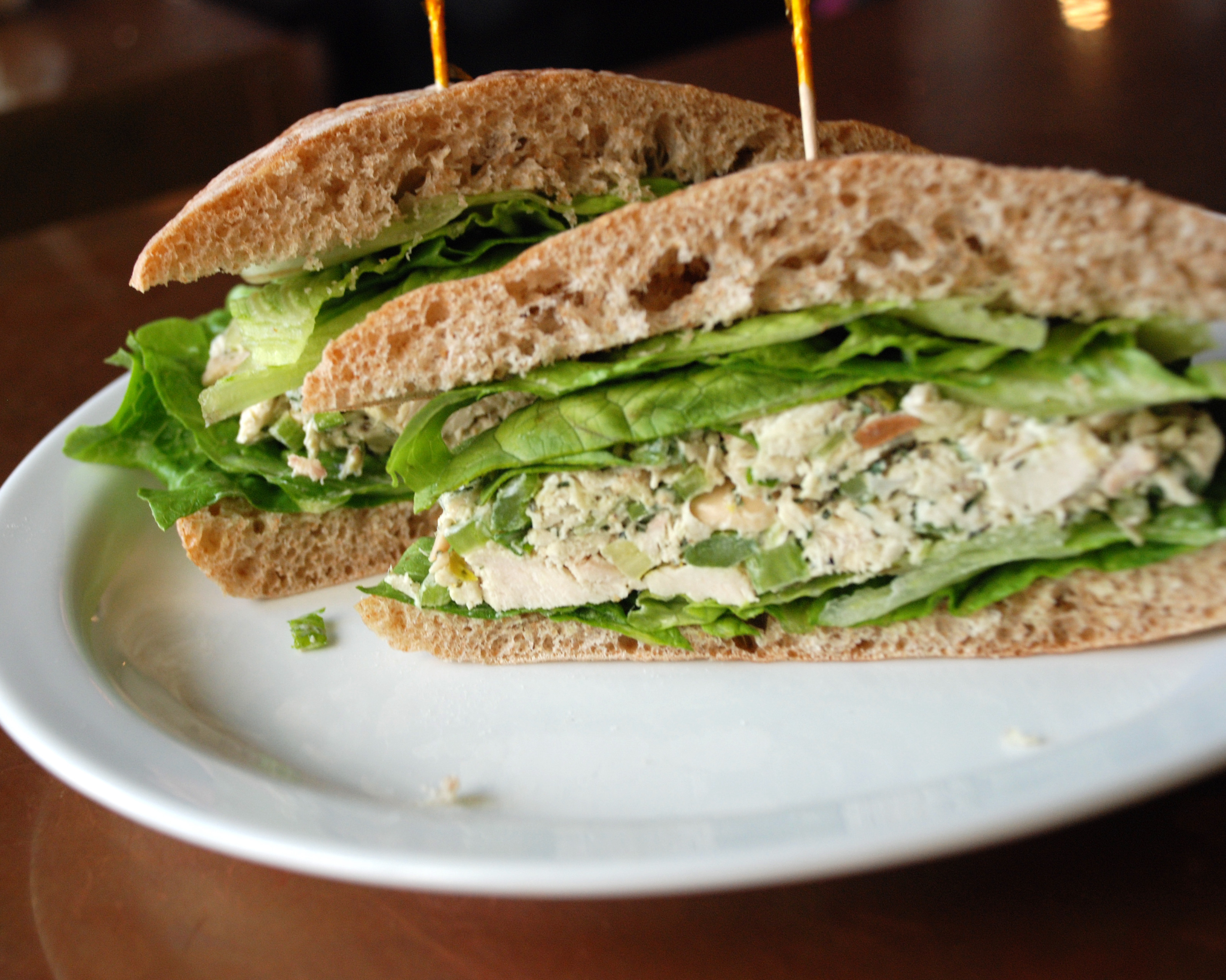
- A chicken salad sandwich
- Course: Main course
- Serving temperature: Hot (or cold, as in submarine sandwich)
- Main ingredients: Chicken, bun

A chicken sandwich is a sandwich that typically consists of boneless, sometimes skinless either chicken breast or thigh, served between slices of bread. Variations on the "chicken sandwich" include chicken on a bun, chicken on a Kaiser, hot chicken, or chicken salad sandwich. A sandwich of hot chicken breast, or a ground chicken patty, is known as a chicken burger.

== Composition ==
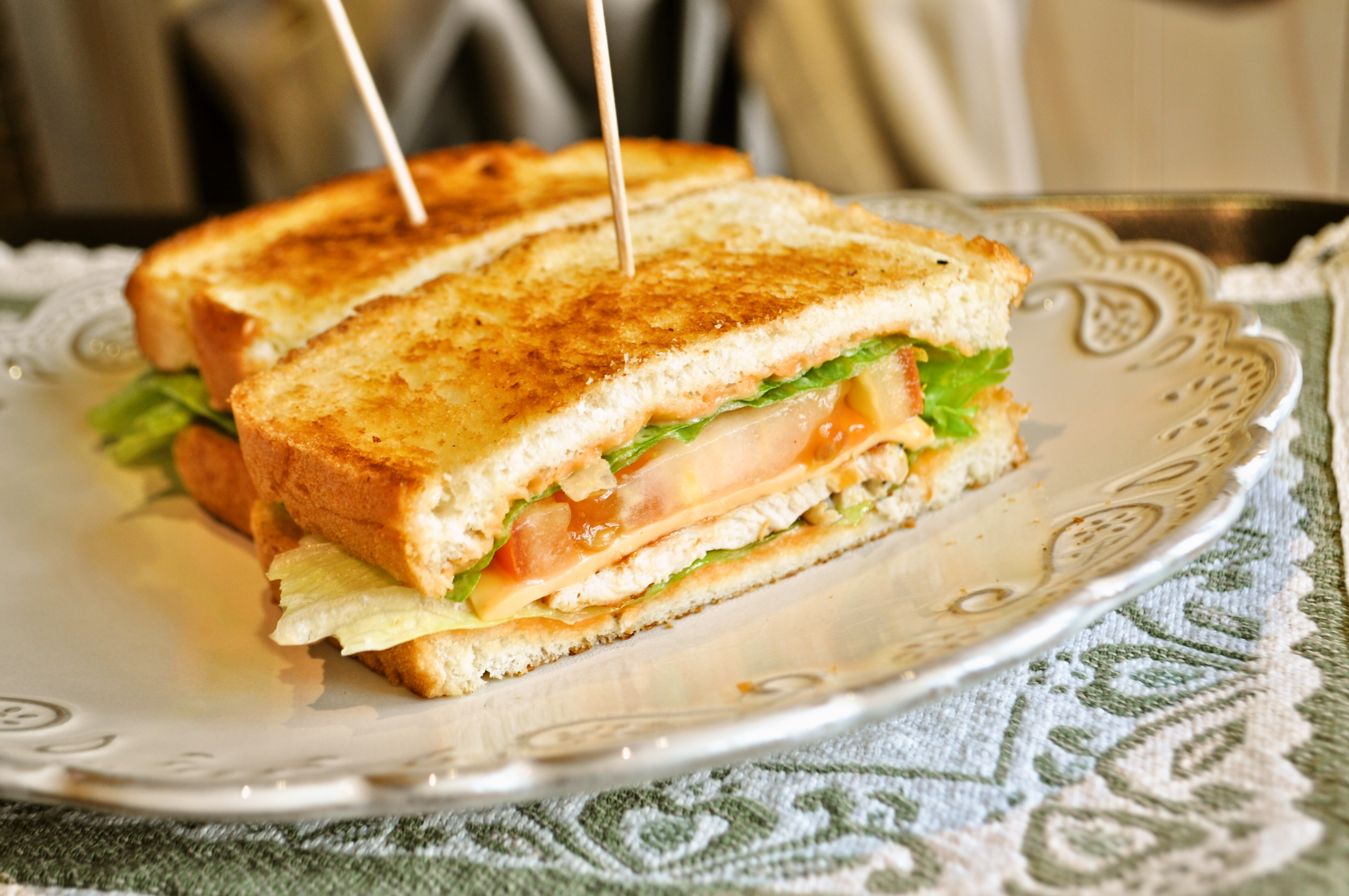
A chicken breast sandwich

A chicken sandwich usually consists of a chicken fillet or patty, toppings and bread. The chicken meat can be deep fried, grilled, spicy, roasted or boiled, served hot or cold, and white or dark meat chicken can be used. Shredded chicken in one form or another, such as chicken salad, can also be used in chicken sandwiches. Another form is made with cold cuts. Wrap versions of the sandwich can also be made, in which the ingredients are rolled up inside a flatbread, such as a tortilla. Open-faced versions of the chicken sandwich, which feature hot chicken served with gravy on top of bread, are also common variations.

== Hot or fried chicken ==
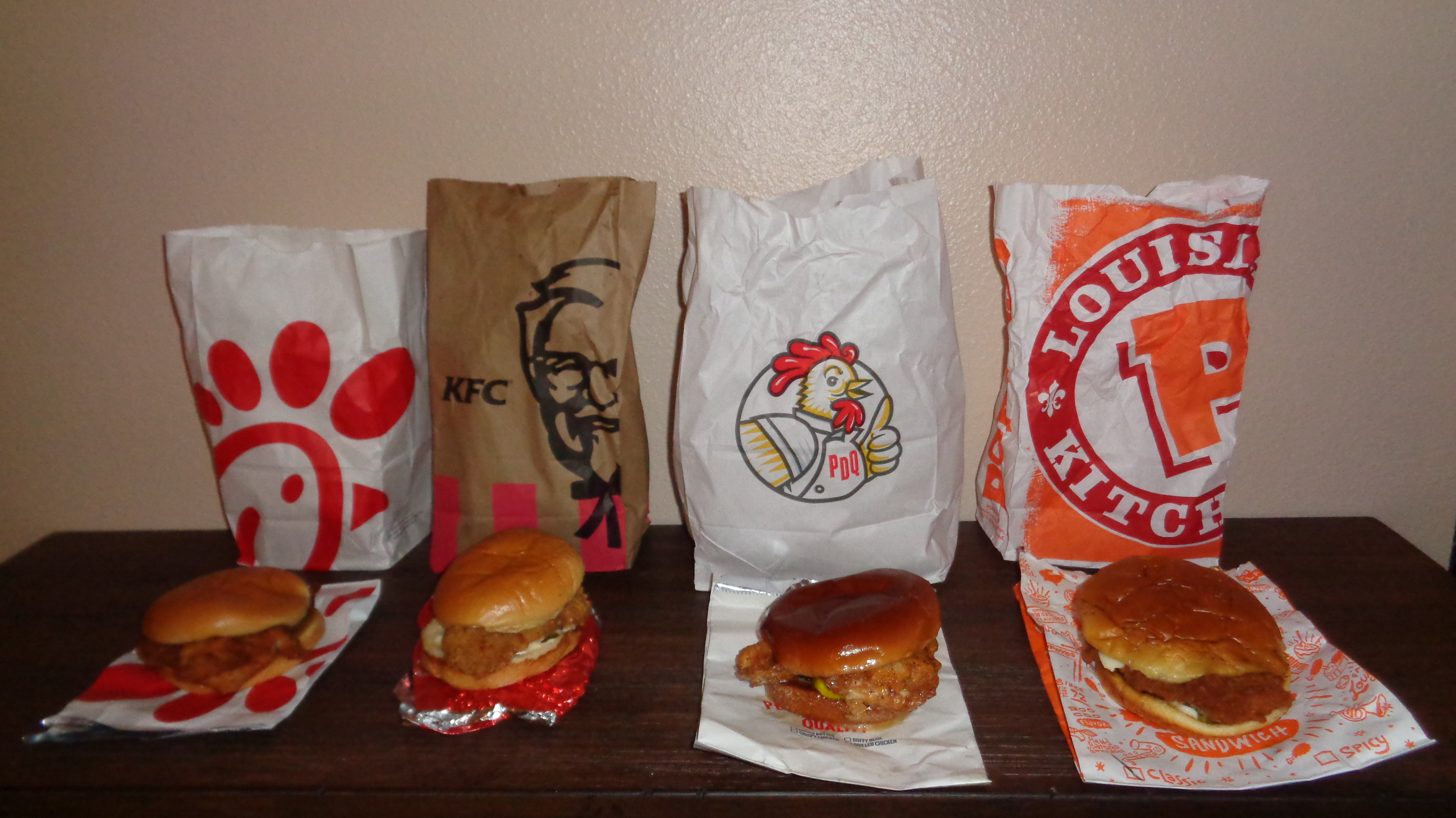
Examples of fried chicken breast sandwiches from Western fast food restaurant chains, as seen from left such as; Chick-fil-A, KFC, PDQ, and Popeyes that are classic competitors in the chicken sandwich wars

Chick-fil-A claims that it invented the fried chicken sandwich in the 1940s. This claim is unsubstantiated, although the Chick-fil-A southern-style chicken sandwich (served with pickles on a steamed roll), introduced in 1964 on March 21, may have been the first sandwich of this style introduced by an American fast food restaurant chain.

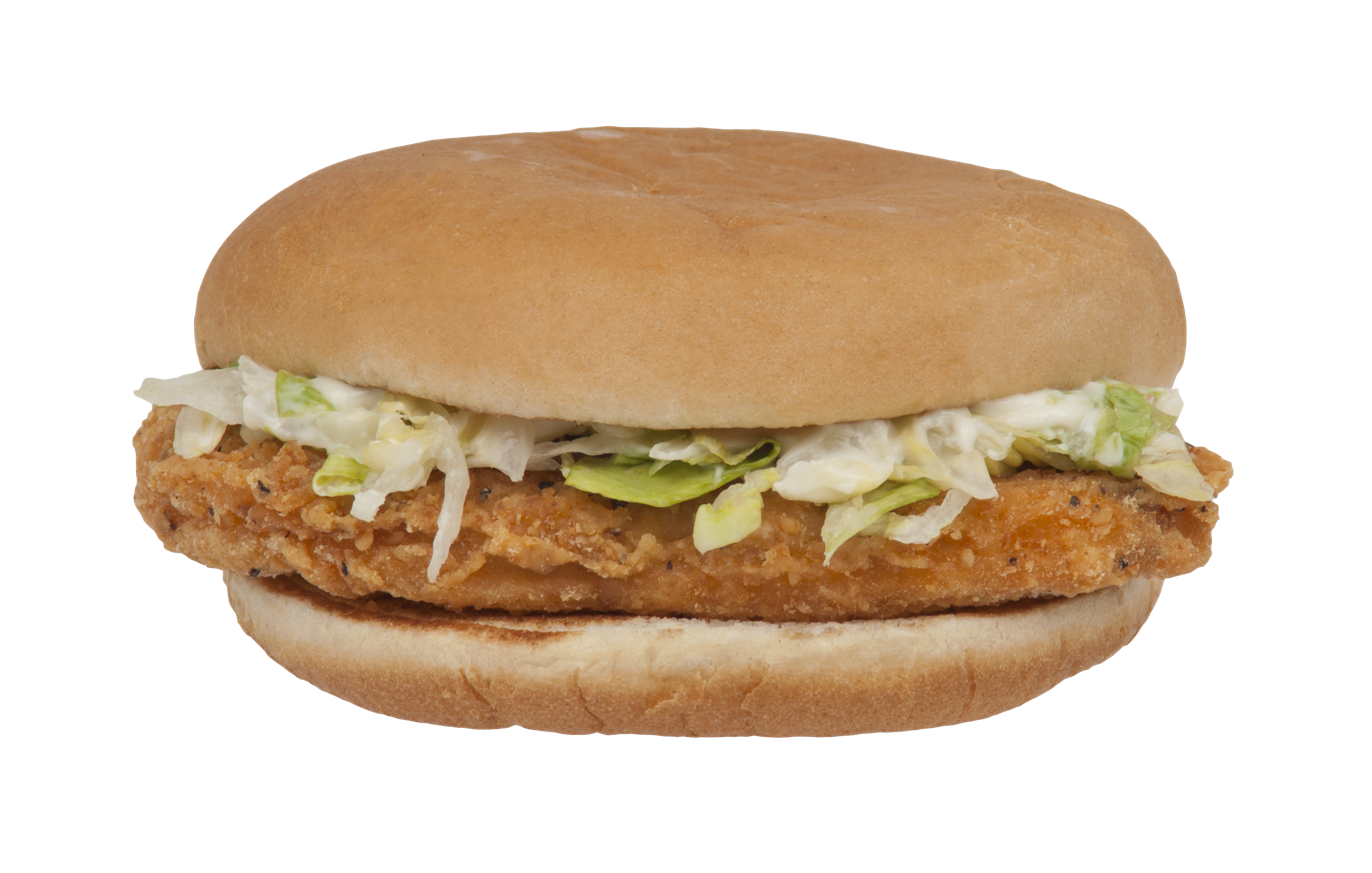
The McChicken is a chicken sandwich with a fried chicken patty.

Burger King introduced its grilled chicken sandwich in 1990, and was the first major fast-food chain to do so. Other notable vendors of similar fried chicken sandwiches include Bojangles, Jollibee, McDonald's, KFC, Popeyes, Shake Shack, Wingstop, and Zaxbys. Today, most major fast food, fast casual and casual dining chains feature some variation of a fried chicken sandwich, even at fast food restaurants where chicken is not a specialty. The Atlantic attribute the appeal of the sandwiches to chicken being a "relatively bland meat" that has an appealing texture when fried, and which can be combined with different dressings.

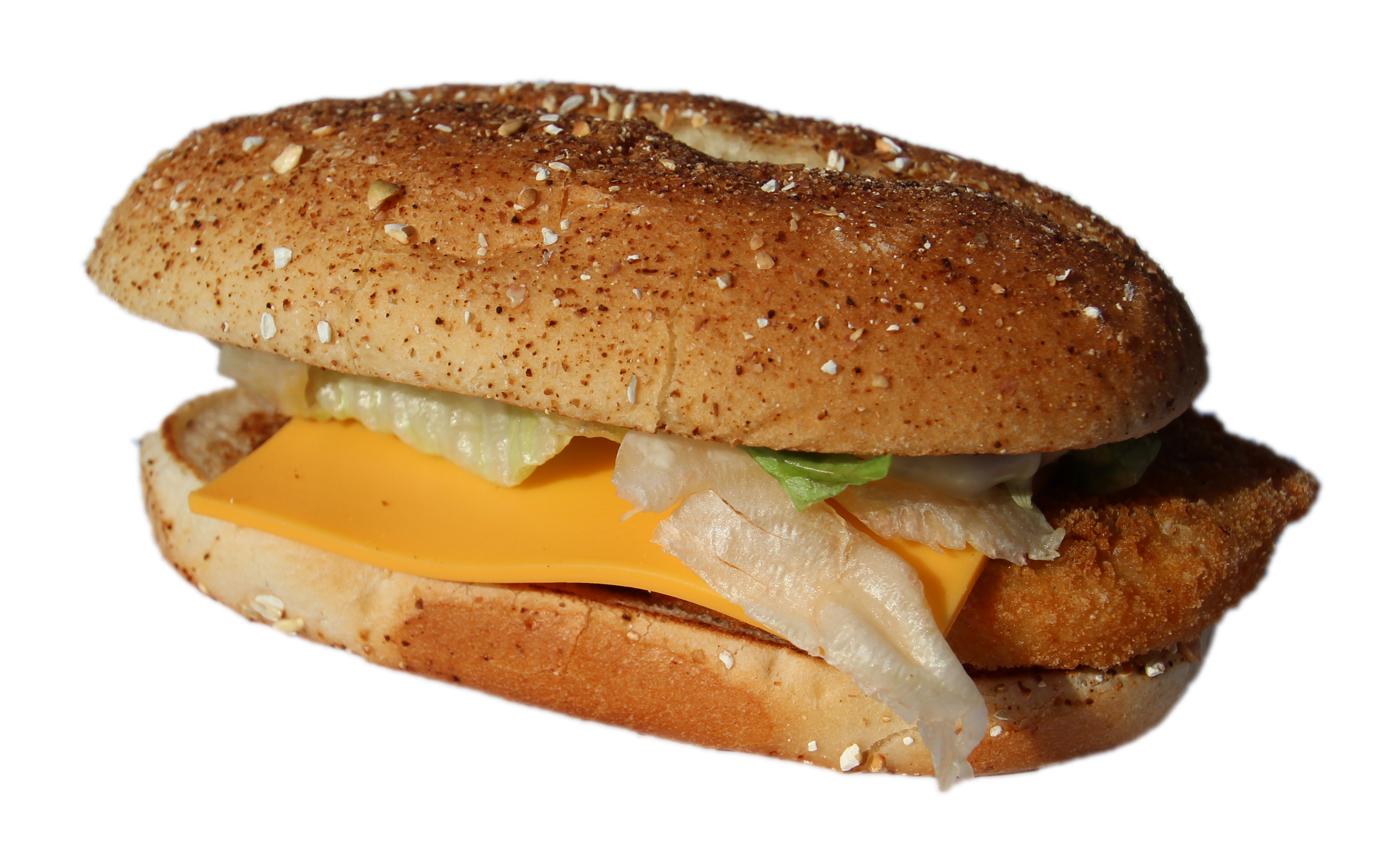
A fried chicken sandwich

In 2019, competition for market share in the United States (characterised as the "chicken sandwich wars") demonstrably impacted the fast casual and quick-service restaurant industry. This competition has coincided with a significant rise in the prevalence of fried chicken sandwiches on menus nationwide. As of 2024, 47% of restaurant menus feature fried chicken sandwiches, compared to 41% for burgers. This represents a 10% increase for fried chicken sandwiches from 2020 to 2021. While burgers may still hold the overall popularity edge, the increasing presence of fried chicken sandwiches on menus was seen as suggesting a growing consumer demand.

The term chicken burger can refer to cooked ground chicken patties.

== Regional varieties ==
=== Ireland ===
In Ireland, the popular chicken fillet roll is a baguette filled with a spicy or plain Southern-fried breaded chicken fillet and a mayonnaise and/or butter spread.

=== Japan ===
The Katsu-sando is a sandwich that consists of two slices of milk bread with a Japanese-style cutlet in between; while most commonly made with tonkatsu (pork cutlet), it may also be made with chicken cutlet.

=== Canada ===
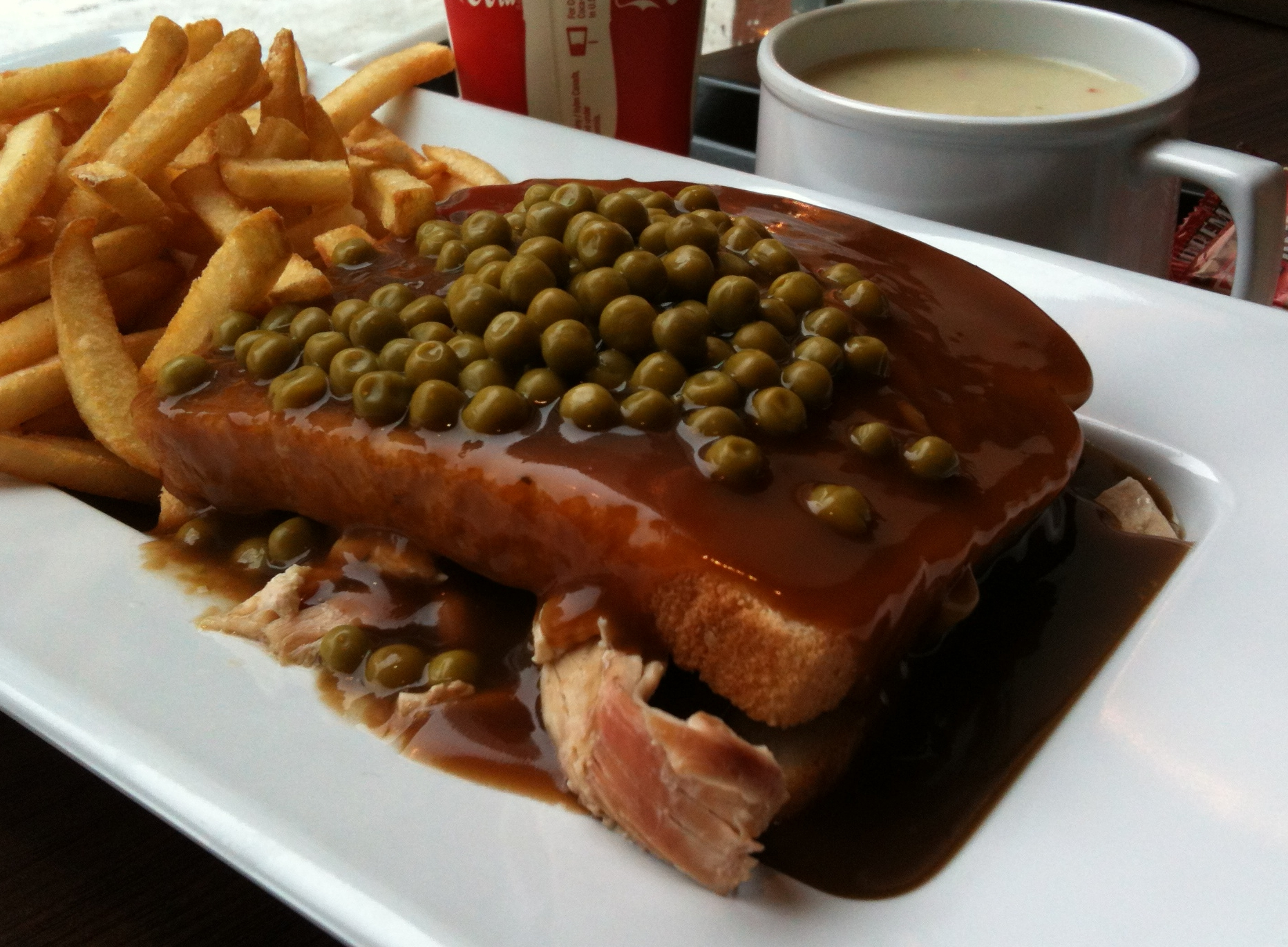
A Quebec-style "hot chicken", topped with green peas

The hot chicken sandwich or simply "hot chicken" is a chicken sandwich covered with gravy eaten with utensils. The sandwich is sometimes served with green peas. It is especially popular in Quebec and is often considered one of the province's staple dishes. Since it is so commonly found in eateries of Quebec (Rôtisserie St-Hubert, Valentine, e.g.) and less seen outside the province, many Québécois regard it as a part of Quebec cuisine and believe it to have originated in the province. This combination of chicken, gravy, and peas is known by its own term: galvaude, seen in poutine galvaude.

The sandwich is also found in small diners in the Canadian Maritimes and throughout the Southeastern United States.

The sandwich was a working-class dish already common and well established in North American cuisine by the early 1900s and featured on the food menus of pharmacists and druggists of the time. Due to its ease of preparation and its minimal costs, the sandwich was also widely served in the mess halls and cafeterias of the mid-1900s.

This style of sandwich often makes use of leftovers from a previous meal. Substituting turkey for the chicken would make a hot turkey sandwich and substituting roast beef makes a variety of the roast beef sandwich.

=== Latin America ===
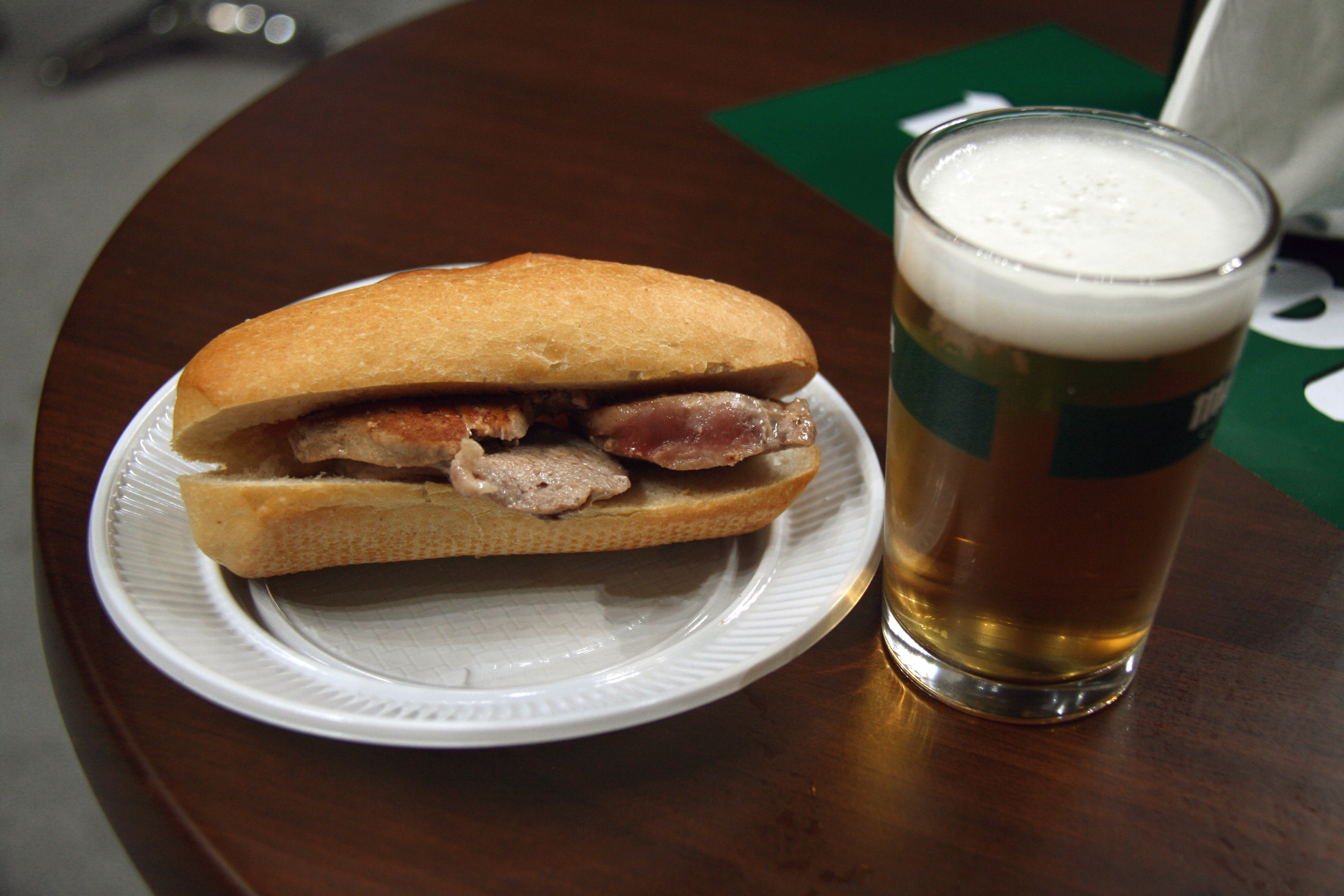
A pepito prepared with chicken meat

The pepito is a sandwich that is prepared with chicken or beef, beans or refried beans and a roll or bun as primary ingredients. It is a common street food in Mexico and Venezuela.

=== United States ===
==== Ohio ====
Found in Ohio is the shredded chicken sandwich. The sandwich is also referred to as a hot chicken sandwich in rural Ohio. The sandwich consists of shredded chicken, one or more types of condensed soup, seasoning and crushed crackers to help thicken and bind the sauce. This dish can be heated on a stove top or slow cooker. Invented as a way to use leftover chicken, these sandwiches became popular for covered dish dinners, potlucks, church dinners and tailgate parties. They are also sold in small-town restaurants, drive-ins and bars.

==== Massachusetts ====
The chicken barb is a sandwich made from pulled chicken, lettuce, and mayonnaise, popular in the cities of Lawrence and Methuen in Massachusetts.

== See also ==
- List of sandwiches
