= Chicken sandwich wars =

Rapid introduction of fried chicken sandwiches to American restaurant menus

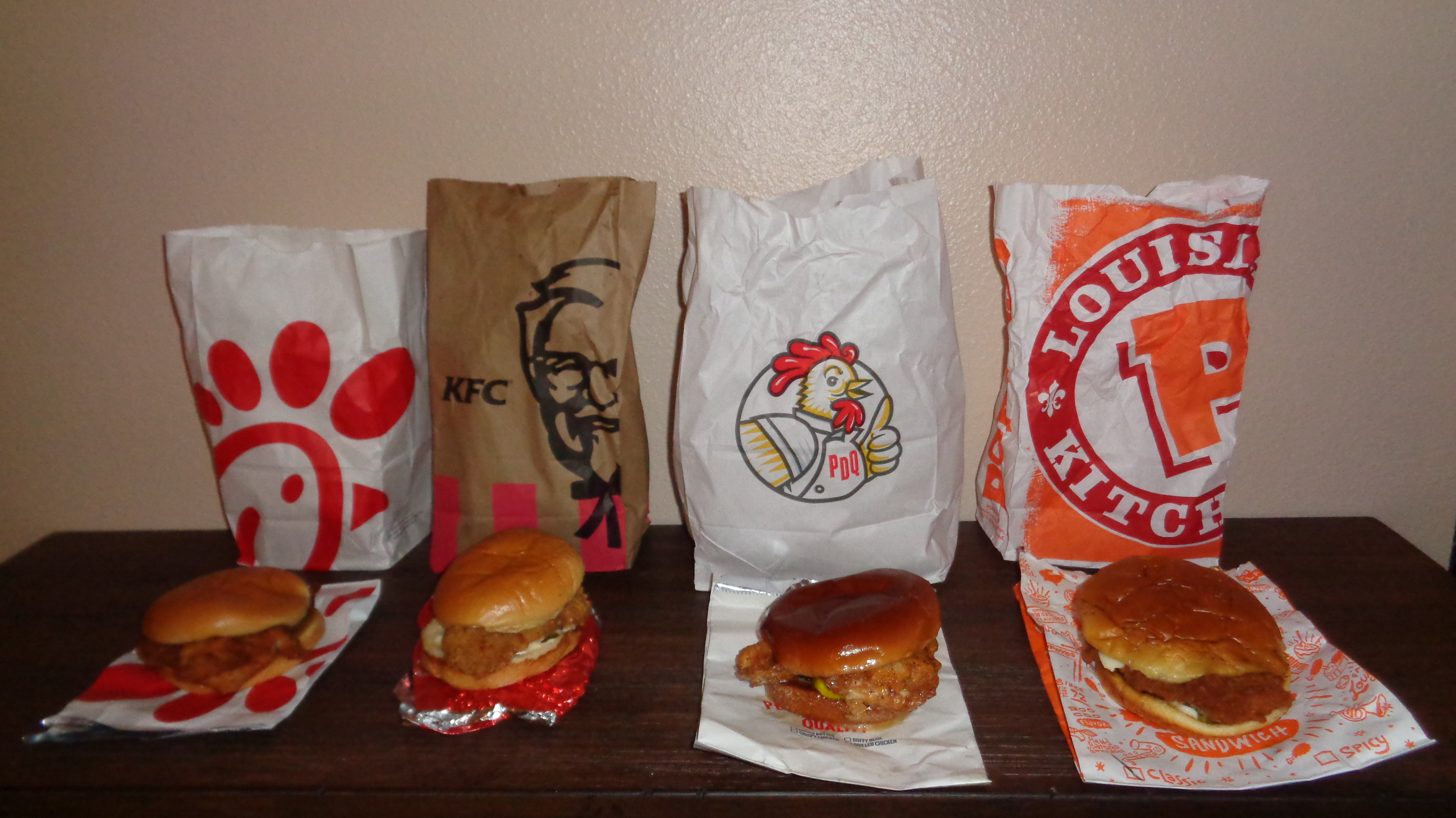
Fried chicken sandwiches bought from (left to right) Chick-fil-A, KFC, PDQ, and Popeyes in 2019

The chicken sandwich wars were a marketing trend in the United States during which numerous American quick serve restaurant chains introduced fried chicken sandwiches to their menus. The phenomenon began in 2019 when Popeyes and Chick-fil-A disputed which of them was first to serve such an item. Over 20 American fast food brands added fried chicken sandwiches to their menus in the following two years. The marketing trend contributed to a chicken shortage in the United States in early 2021, after which the trend faded.

== History ==
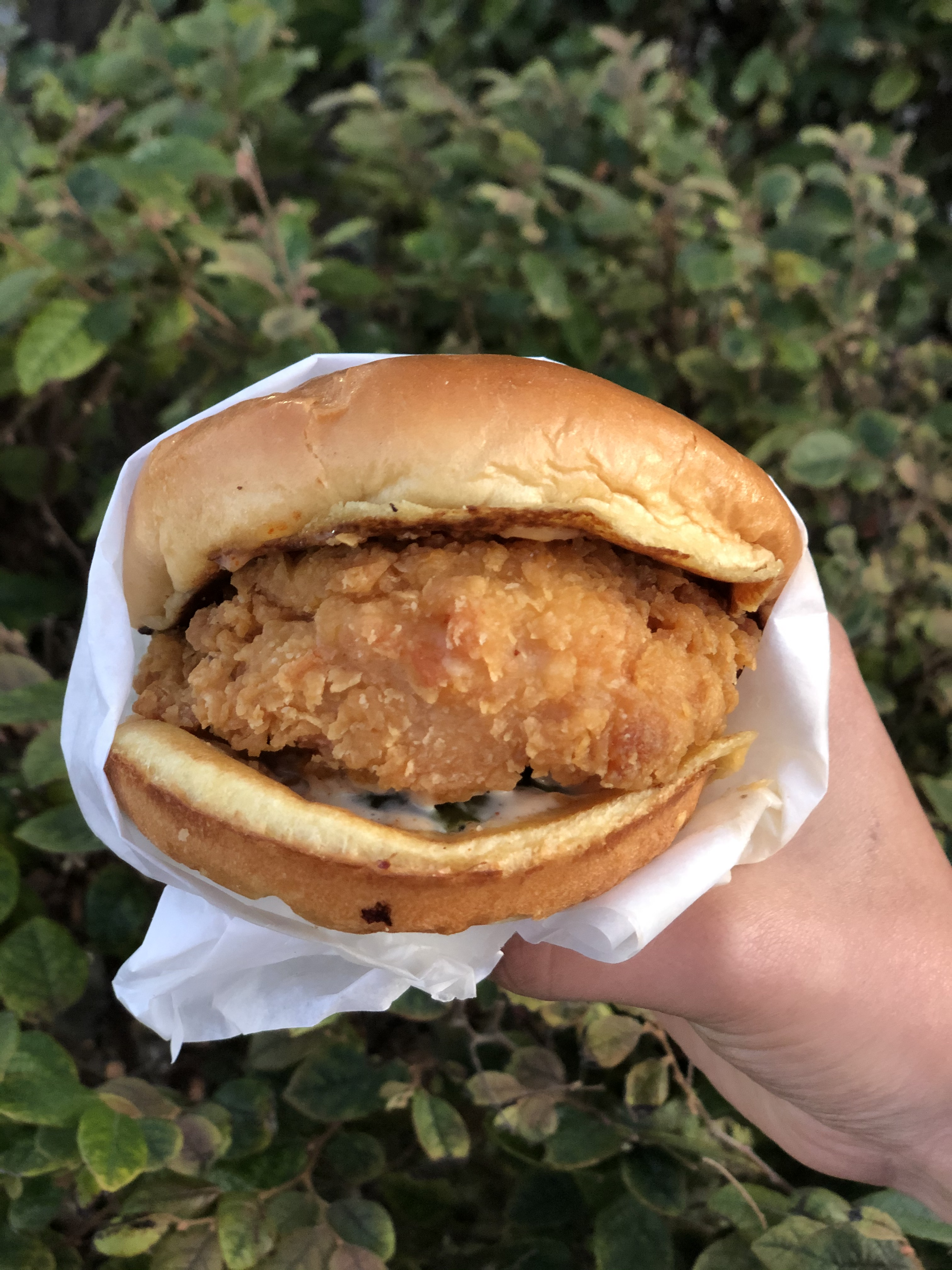
The US chain Popeyes introduced their fried chicken sandwich in 2019

On August 12, 2019, Popeyes introduced a fried chicken sandwich to its menu, an addition that prompted Chick-fil-A (a chain that had seen its market share increase in the 21st century, buoyed by increasing American consumption of chicken) to claim – in a Tweet – that its own fried chicken sandwich predated Popeyes' sandwich. A tête-à-tête on social media between the two restaurant chains followed, which The New York Times reported "captivated the internet for ... [a] week and a half".

By the end of 2019, Popeyes had seen a 38 percent increase in sales, with the surge in business largely attributed to its new chicken sandwich. In a November episode of the comedy serial Saturday Night Live, Harry Styles starred in a sketch that parodied the popularity of the Popeyes chicken sandwich.

In response to the perceived popularity of the Popeyes menu item, additional fast food chains added or expanded fried chicken sandwich offerings to their own menus. By January 2021, more than 20 American fast food brands had introduced or re-released chicken sandwiches. In addition to Popeyes and Chick-fil-A, they included: Golden Chick, KFC, Fatburger, Church's Chicken, Wendy's, BurgerFi, Zaxby's, Fuku, Jack in the Box, Sonic, Carl's Jr., Shake Shack, Boston Market, McDonald's, Pollo Campero, Taco Bell (which introduced its Chicken Sandwich Taco), Bojangles, Panera Bread, Burger King, and Panda Express (which introduced its Orange Chicken Sandwich). In a July 2021 marketing stunt, Airheads candy also introduced a limited edition, novelty chicken sandwich in conjunction with Chicago restaurant Frances' Deli & Brunchery. The sandwich was served on a bun made out of the sour candy.

Popeyes called for a truce on July 28, 2021, as part of a promotion for a "We Come in Piece" 8-piece chicken nugget menu item. Popeyes further purchased $1,000,000 of chicken nuggets from its competitors, and donated these to the Second Harvest Bank of Greater New Orleans and Acadiana. The Chicken sandwich wars became "less intense" after 2021 and consumer preferences for chicken sandwiches had changed little from that time through to 2023. Rabobank Protein Analyst Christine McCracken has speculated that high beef prices may result in a resurgence of the conflict.

== Economic impact ==
According to Edison Trends, "online spending on chicken sandwiches across all restaurants in this analysis combined grew 420% between January 2019 and December 2020." This was likely driven by the shift toward online spending during the pandemic. In April 2021, McDonald's franchisees were selling about 262 chicken sandwiches per day.

Due to the onset and intensity of the chicken sandwich wars, combined with existing supply chain disruptions brought by the COVID-19 pandemic in the United States, shortages of chicken were reported in the United States beginning in the spring of 2021. The National Chicken Council sought to allay public concerns about disruptions to the nation's poultry supply, with a council spokesperson stating in May of that year that there was "a very tight supply but short of a shortage". The same month, the price of chicken in the United States reached a three-year record high, with the pricing surge principally attributed by The Birmingham News to the Chicken Sandwich Wars. Popeyes, meanwhile, began stockpiling chicken in advance of a planned summer menu expansion.

== In popular culture ==
- The podcast My Brother, My Brother and Me has featured a "Munch Squad" segment since 2016 in which Justin McElroy reads out bizarre food press releases and marketing materials for comedic effect. From 2019 to 2021, the segment became dominated by the chicken sandwich wars.

== See also ==
- Burger wars
- Burger King grilled chicken sandwiches
- Coffee wars
- Cola wars
- Food trends
