= Dollar Cravings =

Value menu of restaurant chain Taco Bell

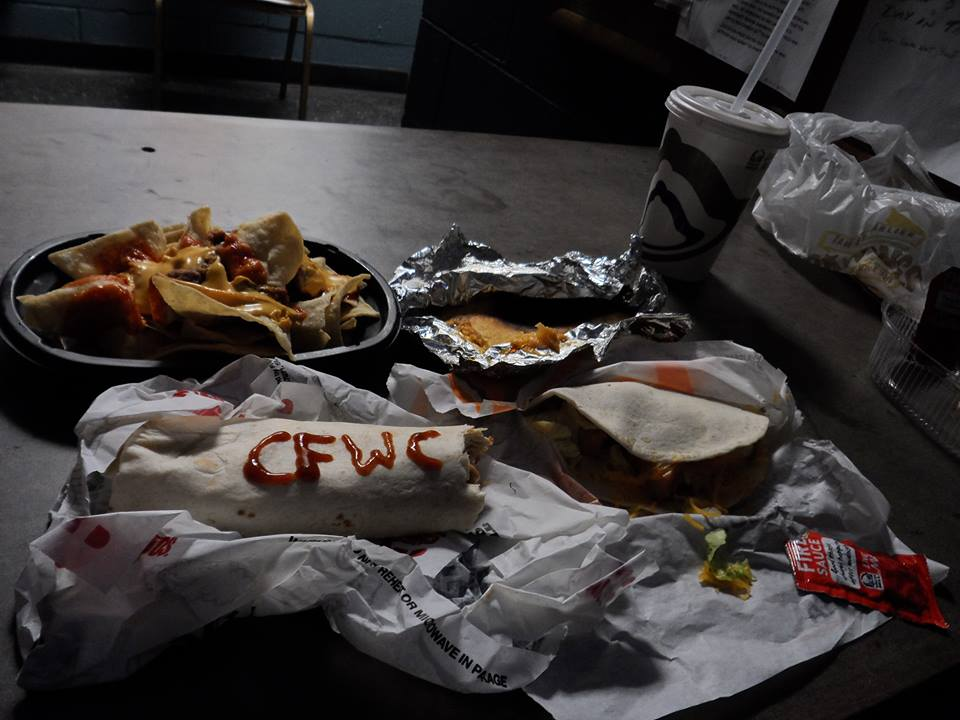
Menu items displayed from this Taco Bell purchase (left to right, top to bottom): Triple Layer Nachos, Shredded Chicken Mini Quesadilla, Cheesy Bean & Rice Burrito, and Spicy Potato Soft Taco.

Dollar Cravings (or $1 Dollar Cravings) is the value menu of American fast-food restaurant Taco Bell. Dollar Cravings was launched August 18, 2014 in reaction to the new McDonald's and Wendy's value/dollar menus. The current menu contains 13 food items. Dollar Cravings replaced Taco Bell's previous value menu Why Pay More. A Taco Bell spokesperson said few of the food items from the Why Pay More menu will remain in Dollar Cravings.

On March 10, 2016, Taco Bell introduced a breakfast value menu.

== History ==
On 26 December 2012, fast food culture site Brand Eating reported Taco Bell planned to replace their value menu Why Pay More with Dollar Cravings. Brand Eating speculated Dollar Cravings was "probably a response to rising food and labor costs." The value menu was tested in select locations in southern California, Kansas City, and Sacramento.

== Cost ==
The pricing of the Dollar Cravings food items was largely determined by the competition from other fast-food restaurants like McDonald's and Wendy's. Magazine Time pointed out the increase in price from 99¢ to a dollar. Television channel CNBC also noted the price increased from the previous value menu Why Pay More which had a three-tiered menu offering food items from 79, 89, or 99 cents.

== Menu ==
The menu was divided based on five food cravings: "Beefy", "Cheesy", "Crunchy", "Spicy", and "Sweet".

Food items on the Dollar Cravings menu include:

Name	Description	Calories	Price
Beefy Fritos Burrito!	A burrito with ground beef, rice, nacho cheese sauce, and Fritos corn chips.	430	$1+tax
Cheesy Bean & Rice Burrito	A burrito with a little cilantro, rice, beans, nacho cheese, and jalapeño sauce.	410	$1+tax
Cheesy Roll Up	A sandwich wrap of three melted cheeses.	180	$1+tax
Cinnabon Delights	Two cinnamon rolls covered in cinnamon and sugar, while filled with cream cheese frosting.	160	$1+tax
Cinnamon Twists	Corn twists with cinnamon and sugar.	170	$1+tax
Shredded Chicken Mini Quesadilla	A quesadilla with shredded chicken, shredded cheese, and chipotle sauce.	180	$1+tax
Spicy Potato Soft Taco	A soft-shell taco with potato, lettuce, chipotle sauce, and shredded Cheddar cheese.	240	$1+tax
Spicy Tostada	A tostada with beans, red sauce, chipotle sauce, lettuce, shredded Cheddar cheese, and tomato.	210	$1+tax
Triple Layer Nachos	Nachos fried and covered with beans, red sauce, and nacho cheese.	320	$1+tax

== Promotion ==
On August 15, 2014, the new menu was advertised via the mobile application Snapchat with the target demographic being millennials.

=== Everlasting Dollars ===
On August 26, 2014, Taco Bell announced the new contest "Everlasting Dollars" in which 11 participants in 11 American cities could win a lifetime of Taco Bell food. However, The Consumerist points out the fine print:

"*Prize awarded as $10,000 in Taco Bell® gift cards. Based on average consumption ($216 per year) for 46 years. Dollar Cravings Menu™ at participating locations. Prices and Items may vary. Prices exclude tax."

— Taco Bell

The A.V. Club proved critical of "Everlasting Dollars" stating "In an unflinchingly honest appraisal, Taco Bell caps a 'lifetime' of eating its food at just 46 years. And in that time, you'll be awarded only $10,000 in gift cards—and this doled out at just $216 per year. While obviously the most humane solution, giving contestants just over $4 to spend on Taco Bell per week is hardly the 'lifetime' of eating Taco Bell you might have imagined. It is as though Taco Bell has promised you a delicious, fulfilling prize, only to totally cheap out on what's inside."

== Reception ==
=== Commercial ===
A writer for Seeking Alpha said that the new menu "could improve same store sales and once again increase the overall value of owning a Taco Bell chain." Canadian Internet news service Digital Journal considered the new menu "a strategy to attract the youth, who had cut down quick-service restaurant visits in the past few years due to low-disposable income amid the sluggishly recovering economy."

=== Food ===
AdWeek's David Griner tried every food item on the menu. On the subject of the Cheesy Roll-Up, Griner called it "the toast sandwich of Taco Bell cuisine." E!'s Julia Hays reviewed the menu favorably stating "[w]e'll take as many Triple Layer Nachos as we can carry." Newspaper Investor's Business Daily described Dollar Cravings as "cheese-and-carb-heavy." Thrillist Media Group's Lee Breslouer had cannabis enthusiast "Jim" try every item on the menu. His ranking placed the items in the order of Triple Layer Nachos, Spicy Tostada, Shredded Chicken Mini Quesadilla, Cheese Roll-Up, Spicy Potato Soft Taco, Cheesy Bean and Rice Burrito, Beefy Mini Quesadilla, Caramel Apple Empanada, Cinnamon Twists, Beefy Fritos Burrito, and Cinnabon Delights.

== See also ==
- Burger Wars
