= Kas (cycling team) =

Cycling team (1956–1979, 1986-1988)

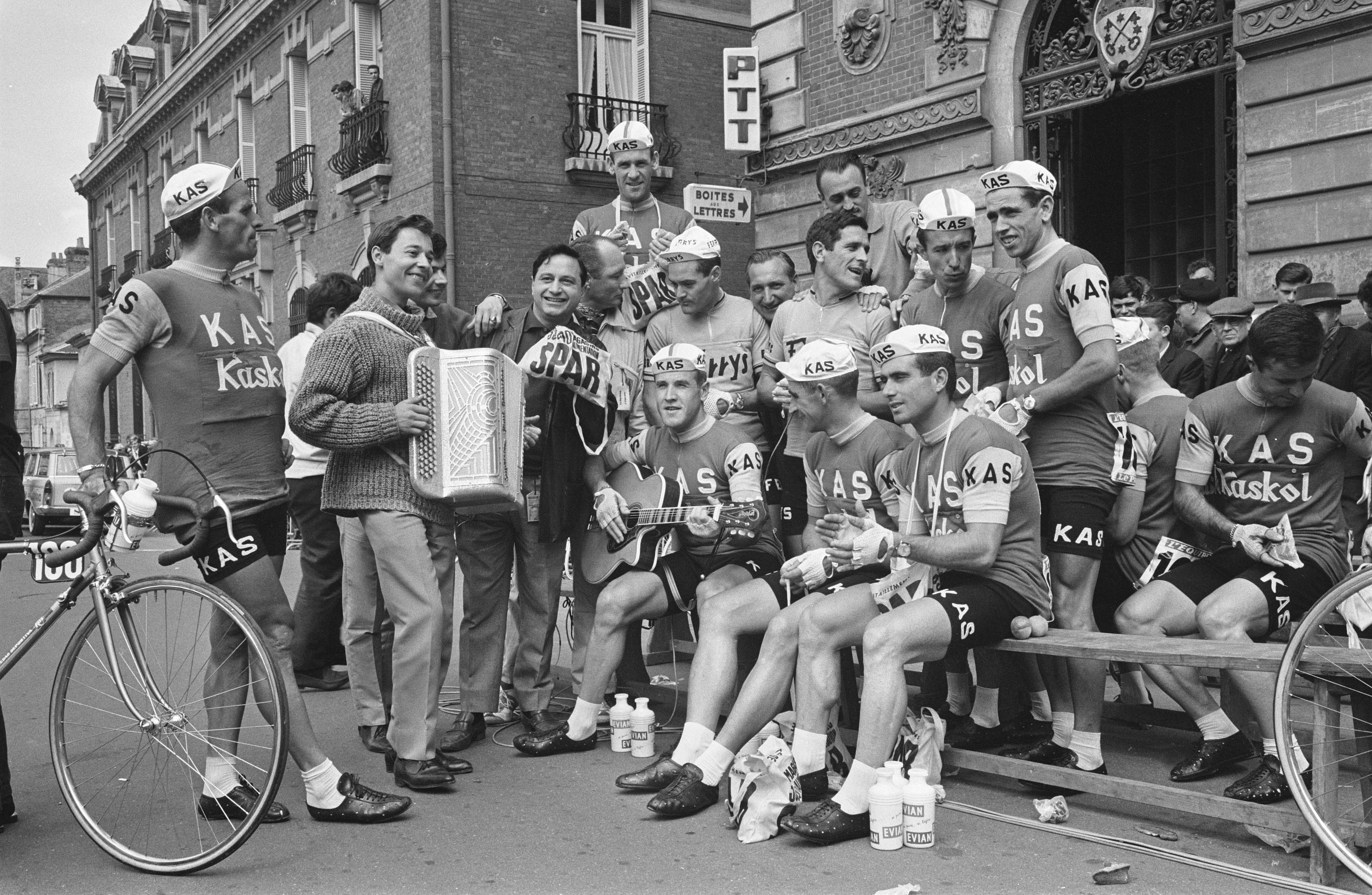
- The Kas–Kaskol team at the 1964 Tour de France

Team information
- UCI code: KAS
- Registered: Spain (1959–1978); Belgium (1979); France (1986); Spain (1987–1988)
- Founded: 1958
- Disbanded: 1988
- Discipline: Road
- Status: Retired

Team name history
- 1958–1960 1961 1962 1963–1975 1976–1979 1986–1987 1988: Kas–Boxing; Kas–Royal Asport; Kas; Kas–Kaskol; Kas–Campagnolo; Kas; Kas–Canal 10
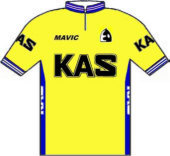
Kas jersey
Jersey

Kas was a Spanish-based professional cycling team which was active from 1958 until 1979 and again for three years in the 1980s. Its name was derived from the name of the principal sponsor of the team, the soft drinks manufacturer, Kas. The team was principally based in Vitoria-Gasteiz, Spain. Its riders typically wore a jersey that consisted of yellow and blue.

== History ==
=== Kas–Kaskol team ===
The Kas team began operating in 1958, and in that year one of its riders, Fausto Izan, won a stage in the Vuelta a España. In 1959 the team signed the 1958 Spanish champion, Federico Bahamontes, who at that time had won two King of the Mountains classifications in both the Tour de France and the Vuelta a España. The Tour de France was disputed by national teams and Bahamontes won the Tour in 1959. Bahamontes left in 1960 but the team won the King of the Mountains in the 1960, 1961 and 1962 Vuelta a España with Antonio Karmay Mestre.

Julio Jiménez again won the King of the Mountains in the 1964 and 1965 Vuelta a España. Kas–Kaskol dominated the 1966 Vuelta with Francisco Gabica winning, Eusebio Vélez Mendizabal second and Carlos Echeverría third. It also dominated the King of the Mountains competition with Gregorio San Miguel winning. The team won six stages and held the yellow jersey for 14 of the 18 stages.

Kas won the team prize in the 1967 and 1968 Vuelta. In 1971 the team signed the best new professional of the 1970 Vuelta, José Manuel Fuente. Fuente won the mountains classification in the 1971 Giro d'Italia and then won the Vuelta in 1972. A Kas teammate, Miguel María Lasa, was second and four other Kas riders placed in the top ten. The team won the mountains, points, and combination classifications and the team prize. It wore the yellow jersey for 17 of the 18 stages .

Fuente and his team went to the 1972 Giro d'Italia where Fuente took the maglia rosa and the race became a battle between him and Eddy Merckx in the mountains in which Merckx prevailed.

Fuente won the 1974 Vuelta, the third rider to win two editions of the race. Fuente led from the 10th stage but fell and then lost more time in the final time trial. He won by 11 seconds. Kas again won the team prize.

The following year Kas won the mountains, points and team classifications as well as holding the yellow jersey for 19 stages until the final time trial, when Agustín Tamames took it and left the Kas teammates Domingo Perurena and Miguel María Lasa on the lower steps of the podium. Fuente abandoned the race with problems which led to the end of his career.

Kas won the Vuelta again in 1976 with José Pesarrodona and the mountains competition with Andrés Oliva. In the 1976 Tour de France they won the team classification by placing four riders in the top 12 and three others in the top 30. They also won the team prize in the 1978 and 1979 Vuelta. In 1979 many Belgian riders joined and the chief directeur sportif was the Belgian Robert Lelangue. 1976 Tour winner Lucien Van Impe won a stage for the team in the 1979 Tour de France The sponsor then retired from the peloton.

=== 1980's Kas team ===
In 1985 Kas returned as a co-sponsor of the French-based Skil–Sem team run by French directeur sportif Jean de Gribaldy. The following year Kas took over as title sponsor from Skil and the Kas jersey returned but the team remained French-based. However, the team rode more Spanish races to satisfy the new sponsor. In 1986, Sean Kelly improved on his ninth place in the 1985 Vuelta a España by coming third, winning the points jersey at the Vuelta for the third time. Kelly also won the Tour of the Basque Country and the Volta a Catalunya.

The team had further success in 1986 with Kelly, who was the World's number 1 rider during this period, winning 'monument' classics Milan–San Remo and Paris–Roubaix, with Acácio da Silva who won the Züri-Metzgete, and with the Swiss cyclo-cross champion, Pascal Richard.

In January 1987 de Gribaldy died in a car crash. After that the team became Spanish-based. In the 1987 Vuelta a España, Kelly led with three days to go when he had to withdraw due to injury. He won the event in 1988, Kas' last win in the Vuelta. After 1988 the team stopped as the team owner died in 1988 and Kas retired from sponsorship.

Kas also sponsored several Spanish cyclo-cross riders in 1980, 1993 and 1994.
