= Kas (drink) =

Soft drink produced by PepsiCo

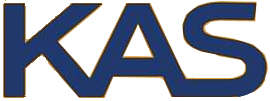
- Product type: Soft drink
- Current owner: PepsiCo (1991–pres.)
- Country: Spain
- Introduced: 1956; 70 years ago
- Markets: Europe
- Previous owners: El As (1956–92)
- Website: pepsico.es/kas

Kas is the brand name of a soft drink produced by PepsiCo. It is made in grapefruit, orange (yellow), lemon (greenish-yellow), bitter (herbal extracts), and apple flavors. Kasfruit juices are also offered in multiple flavors. Kas is available in Spain, Mexico, Dominican Republic and France, and was available in Portugal, Brazil and Argentina during the 1990s.

It is part of a beverage area often referred to as the flavor segment, fruit-flavored beverages which may be carbonated.

== History ==
The brand's origins can be traced to 1870, when German-origin Román Knörr Streiff beer-crafter that worked for Bauhöfer Brewery in Renchen-Ulm, Baden-Württemberg arrived in Vitoria and founded, with the family of his wife (Pilar Ortíz de Urbina) a beer factory named 'La Esperanza'.

In the 1920s, one of their sons, Román Knörr Ortíz decided to start his own business to produce sodas, named 'El As'.

In 1956 in Vitoria-Gasteiz, Araba, the capital of the Basque Country, Luis Knörr Elorza created a beverage that was a mix of soda with orange juice, giving origin to the first flavored soda of Spain. It was named 'Kas' (adding the 'K' from the family name to the original 'As' trademark, this idea was given by his brother, Javier Knörr Elorza). During the 1960s, the company expanded and grew, opening new plants in Spain. New products were launched such as a Kascol (cola) and the 'BitterKas', a commercial success. For decades, the company also sponsored a cycling team and even the Spain national football team during the 1982 FIFA World Cup.

The company was acquired by the multinational corporation Pepsi in 1992, and expanded into diet soft drinks and juices. Pepsi commercialised Kas products in the Spanish market while using the Mirinda brand worldwide.

== Advertising ==
Kas promotion has included a landmark 24 Horas Kas campaign in the mid-1990s that included a catchy jingle based on the song "Dame Más" (Give Me More) by Alex de la Nuez a cover of the Steve Miller Band's song "Give It Up" from 1982 album Abracadabra. The campaign featured the "Chica Kas" ('Kas Girl') (a response to "Chica Mirinda"), an attractive woman wearing a broad-brimmed hat and slinky dress, in situations involving cultural taboos and with sexual overtones.

Faced with Coca-Cola's competitive launch of grapefruit-flavored Fresca in 1994, Pepsi-Cola de Mexico launched Kas grapefruit into the Mexican market. The Spanish 24 Horas Kas campaign was adapted to the Mexican market for launch, and the Dame Mas song interpreted by the Argentine pop group The Sacados from their album Alter Nativo heavily promoted, eventually charting high in the Mexican music market. The launch also included extensive television commercials, radio commercials, billboards and a tasting campaign in bars and clubs to promote Kas as a mixer with tequila. In 2006 the brand was renamed as Kas Mas.

== Other markets ==
In France, Kas became popular in the southwestern part of the country, where it is often mixed with gin or vodka. In the Dominican Republic, Kas was introduced by Supermercados Iberia.

In the mid-1990s, in order to succeed in the Brazilian market, where there are several soft drink brands on the market made from guarana extract, Kas was introduced in several guarana-derived flavours, which included guarana by itself or with acerola, maracuja, and peach. Production ended shortly after launch, and the orange, lemon, and apple flavours were never available in Brazil.
