= Ramblin' Root Beer =

Root beer brand

Ramblin' Root Beer

Ramblin' Root Beer is a root beer formerly made by The Coca-Cola Company.

As of 2022, Ramblin' Root Beer is again available for sale, distributed by Orca Beverage of Mukilteo, Washington.
