= Double decker taco =

Offering at Taco Bell restaurants

The Double Decker Taco is an offering of Taco Bell restaurants. It is a regular hard-shell taco wrapped in a flour tortilla filled with refried beans.

== History ==
The Double Decker Taco was introduced as a limited-run promotional item in 1995, and was advertised in a series of commercials produced by Spike Lee featuring NBA basketball stars Shaquille O'Neal and Hakeem Olajuwon, before becoming a permanent menu item. The Double Decker Taco joined the regular menu items in June 2006. A cheesy version, which featured nacho cheese sauce in addition to the refried beans in between the tortilla and the taco shell, was briefly introduced in 2011.

On September 12, 2019, Taco Bell removed the Double Decker Taco from their menu.

On December 5, 2023, responding to years of requests from die-hard fans, Taco Bell brought the Double Decker back for a limited time.

On October 9, 2024, Taco Bell announced they would bring back the Double Decker taco again for a limited time from October 10 through October 30, 2024.

On August 28, 2025, Taco Bell announced they would create the "Decades Y2K Menu" featuring the revival of iconic favorites including the Double Decker. The new menu will be available for a limited time starting September 9, 2025.
