= Pepito (sandwich) =

Type of sandwich

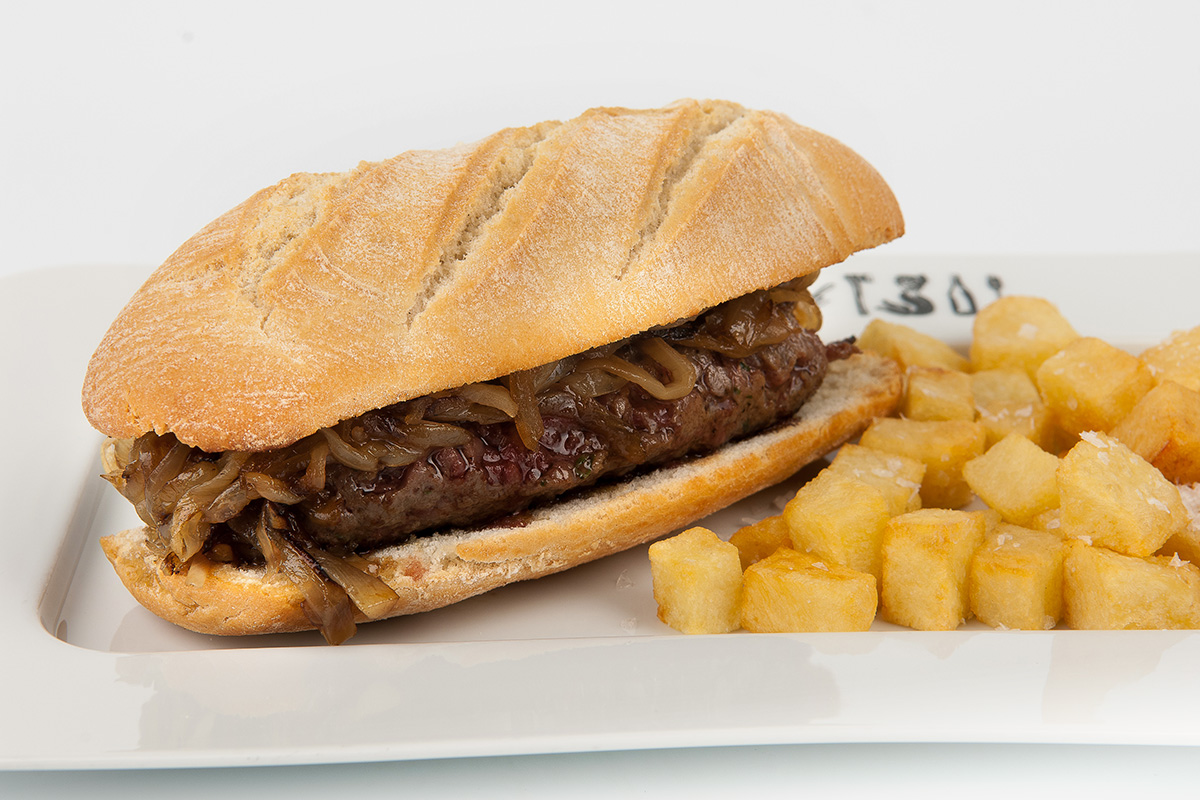
A beef pepito with caramelized onions and a side dish of potatoes

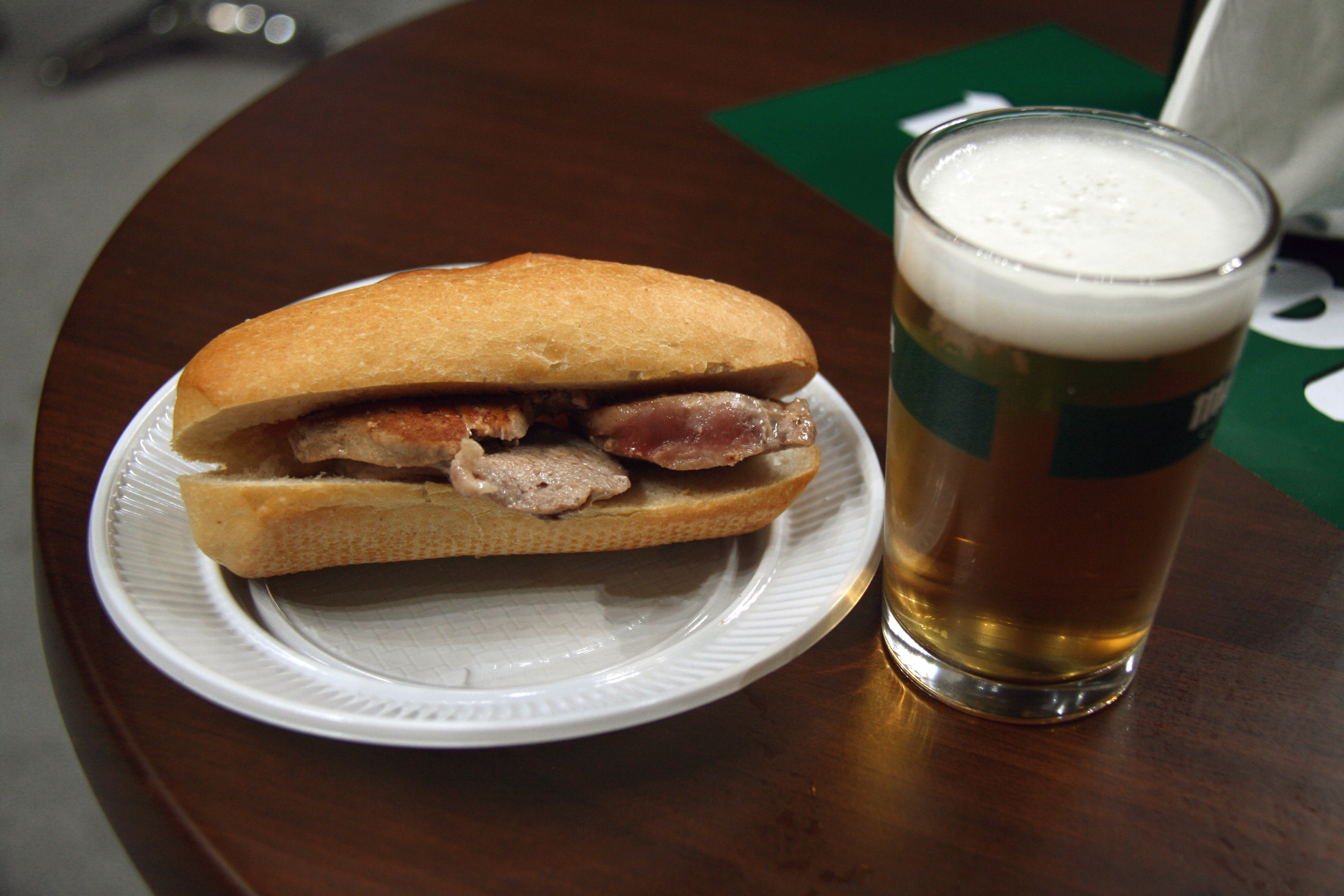
A Spanish pepito prepared with chicken, served with beer

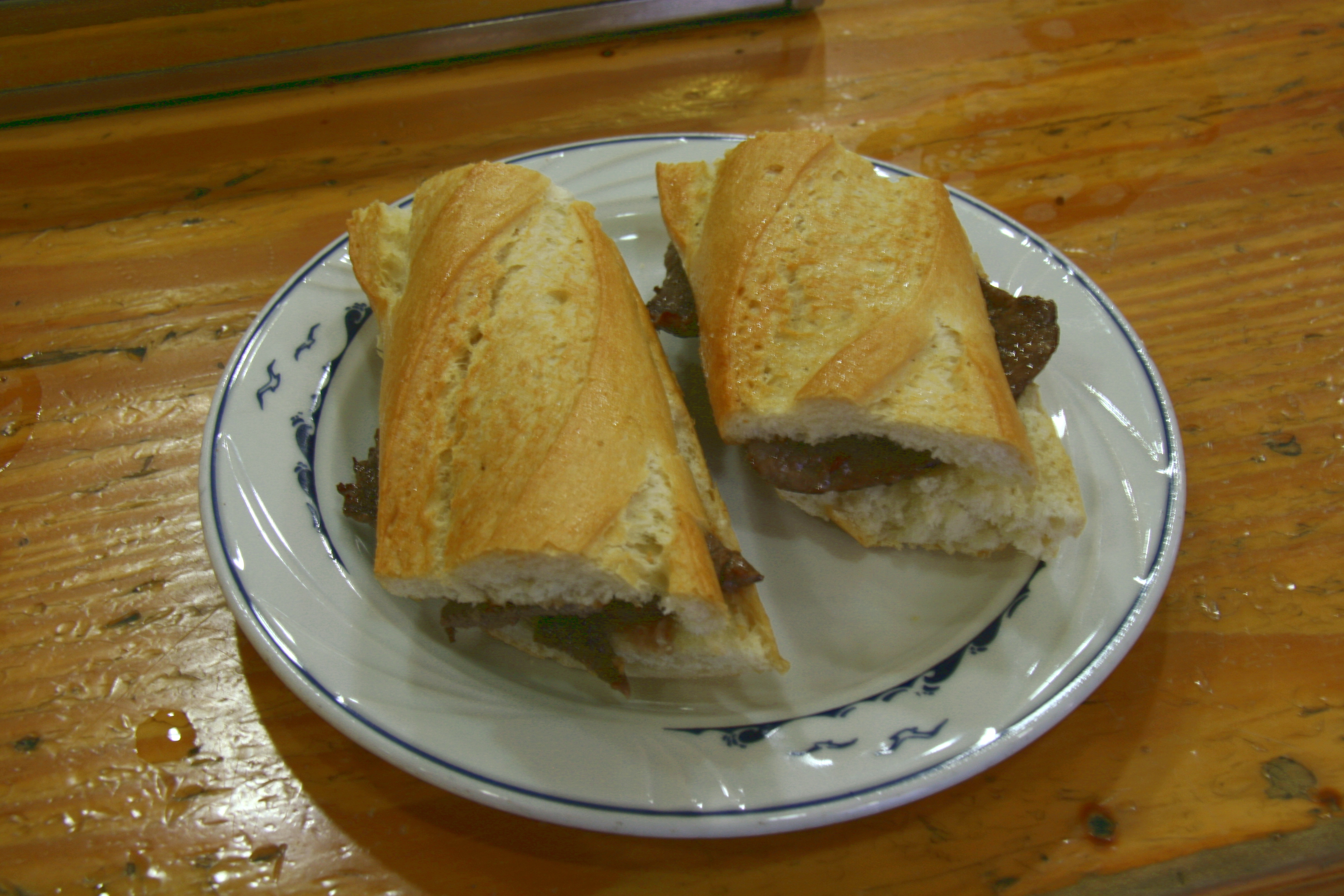
A simple beef pepito

The pepito is a sandwich prepared with beef, pork, or chicken originating from Spain and also very popular in Latin America. It is a common street food in Venezuela and is also available at some U.S. restaurants. For the beef version, various cuts of beef are used, and myriad additional ingredients can be used in its preparation.

== Preparation ==
The pepito is prepared with grilled beef tenderloin, flank steak, rib eye steak or strip steak, refried beans, black beans or pinto beans, and a soft roll, bun or baguette as primary ingredients. Chicken meat is also used sometimes.

Additional ingredients used can be myriad, including but not limited to eggs, cheese, lettuce, sliced or diced tomato, sliced avocado, guacamole, guasacaca (an avocado-based relish), garlic, cilantro, olives, jalapeño or pickled jalapeño peppers, onions, caramelized or sautéed onions, crema or mayonnaise, butter, olive oil, fresh lime juice, Worcestershire sauce, hot sauce, mustard, cumin, salt and pepper.

Some versions of the sandwich have a significant amount of toppings and garnishes, while others are simpler preparations using only the base ingredients and a few additional ingredients.

== In Latin America ==
The pepito is a common street food in Venezuela and originates in Barquisimeto, the capital of the state of Lara in Venezuela. The pepito is one of the most popular street foods in Venezuela. (Note: "The pepito is a sandwich that is one of Venezuela's most popular street foods.") It is purveyed at some restaurants and department stores in Mexico City. In Venezuela, they are sometimes sold by street vendors, who often provide several sauces that can be added atop the sandwich. The customer can typically tell the vendor what ingredients and toppings to use on the sandwich in Venezuela.

== In Spain ==
Bars with a kitchen often offer a pepito de ternera (beef sandwich), cooked on demand. The name has extended to other sandwiches. Those made of cured pork tenderloin are also called montado de lomo. Variations adding pressed ham and cheese, bacon, fried, roasted or preserved peppers are also common. Teodoro Bardají Mas, a cuisine historian and cook, offered an origin story in an article in the weekly Ellas.

At the Café de Fornos of Madrid, one of the sons of the founder was named José Fornos and nicknamed Pepito. One day he asked for a hot sandwich instead of a lunch meat one. He was served a beef sandwich. When other Fornos customers asked for "one like Pepito's", the name caught.

== In the United States ==
Some restaurants in the United States purvey the pepito, such as in Miami, Chicago, Illinois, California, Atlanta and other U.S. cities.

== Other meanings ==
In Spanish, a pepito can also be an elongated bun filled with cream or chocolate.

== See also ==
- Arepa
- List of sandwiches
- List of street foods
