= Tar derby =

Period of cigarette advertising

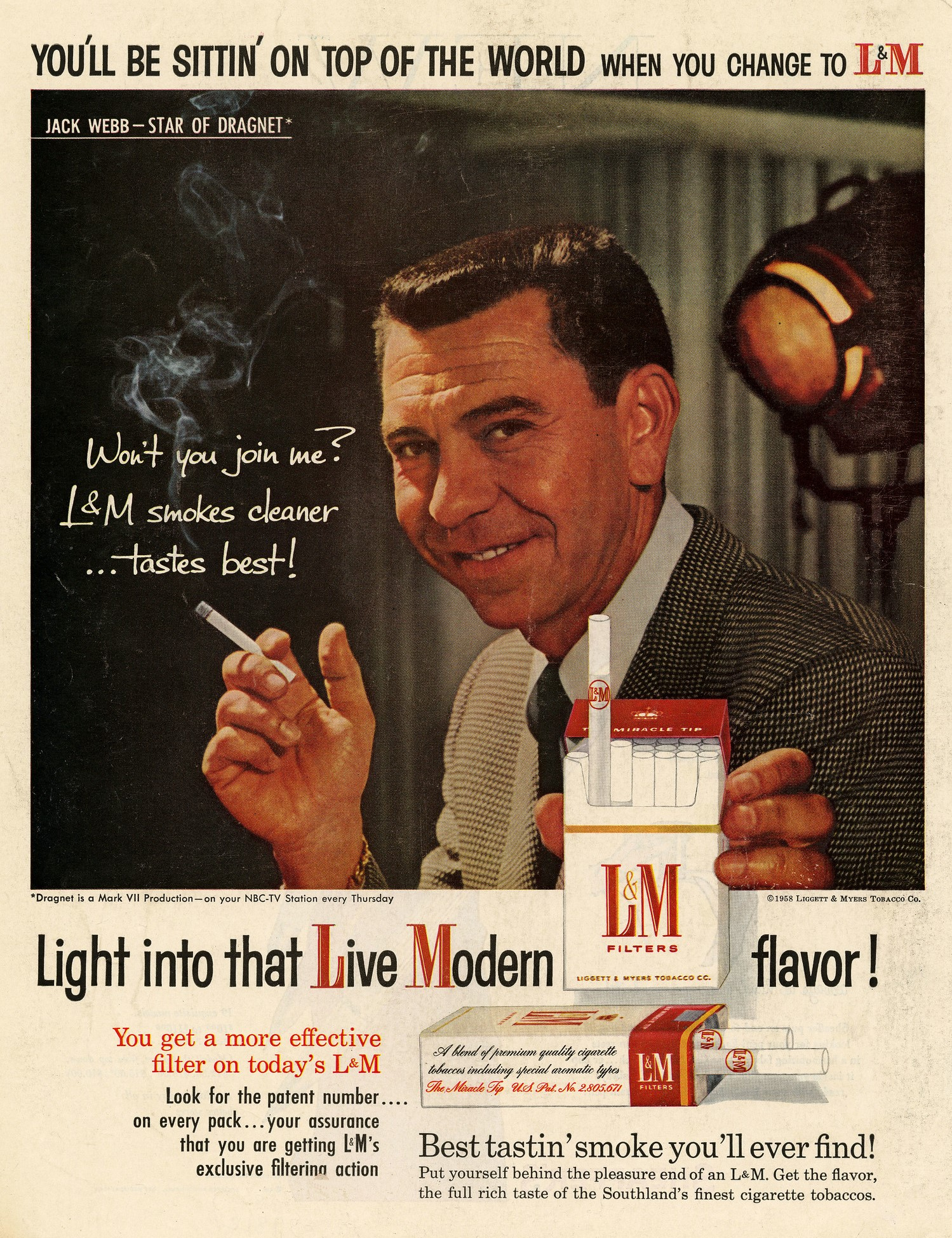
1958 advertisement for L&M cigarettes, promoting the brand's "exclusive filtering action"

The tar derby is the period in the 1950s marked by a rapid influx in both cigarette advertising focused on tar content measurements to differentiate cigarettes and brand introduction or repositioning focusing on filter technology. The period ended in 1959 after the Federal Trade Commission (FTC) Chairman and several cigarette company presidents agreed to discontinue usage of tar or nicotine levels in advertisements.

== Leading up to the derby ==
In 1950, the FTC responded to the trend in cigarette manufacturers’ advertising tactic of comparing health effects or tar and nicotine levels by issuing cease and desist orders for advertising campaigns using these. However, these orders did not cover newly introduced brands of cigarettes.

At the same time, three significant scientific articles were released, two in one issue of the Journal of the American Medical Association and a third in the British Medical Journal, which linked tobacco smoking to lung cancer.

A noticeable decline in per capita tobacco consumption helped stimulate companies to implement harm reduction technology in new brands of cigarettes, especially filters. Before the articles linking tobacco smoking and lung cancer were released, in 1950, filter cigarettes only accounted for 1-2% of the market. This statistic grew to 10% by 1954. Lorillard started the trend with their Kent cigarette. It was introduced in 1951 with a “micronite” filter made to block tar from entering the smoker’s body, using asbestos. Each major tobacco company followed suit with their own brands, such as R. J. Reynolds' Winstons and Ligget & Myers' L&Ms.

Companies began promoting their brands with claims that clearly positioned other cigarettes as dangerous to one’s health and overall sales continued to decline as market shares quickly shifted towards brands focusing on filtered products.

In 1953, the Presidents of the major cigarette manufacturers met in New York City to discuss a response to the scientific reports linking smoking and cancer and retained John Hill, a noted advertising guru of the time. This eventually led to a two-full-page advertisement placed in 448 newspapers, reaching a circulation of 43,245,000 in 258 cities, outlining the opinion of the newly formed Tobacco Industry Research Committee. This advertisement is known as A Frank Statement to Cigarette Smokers.

Another round of FTC regulation in 1955 banned all references to "throat, larynx, lungs, nose or other parts of the body," or to "digestion, energy, nerves or doctors" for all brands, new and old. However, another loophole is left open with the stipulation that tar and nicotine claims were prohibited "when it has not been established by competent scientific proof ... that the claim is true, and if true, that such difference or differences are significant." This regulation leads to significant shifts in advertisements to focus on taste and pleasure for two years. Filter cigarettes continued to grow in popularity and the emphasis on taste and pleasure helped rebound industry wide sales.

== The start of the great derby ==
In 1957, two years after the FTC's guidelines on cigarette advertisements were released, the Surgeon General issued the "Joint Report of Study Group on Smoking and Health.” The report stated, "It is clear that there is an increasing and consistent body of evidence that excessive cigarette smoking is one of the causative factors in lung cancer," which solidified the Surgeon General’s position on tobacco. During the same year, Reader’s Digest included tar and nicotine measurements in their magazine for the first time since the early 1950s.

July 1957 Consumer's Digest Tar Measurements

Plain Tips

Brand	Size	Tar (mg)
Cavalier	King	42.8
Old Gold	King	41.7
Phillip Morris	King	41.1
Chesterfield	King	40.8
Raleigh	King	39.3
Pall Mall	King	38.6
Tareyton	King	36.6
Phillip Morris	Regular	35.3
Chesterfield	Regular	32.7
Lucky Strike	Regular	31.5
Kool	Regular	31.3
Camel	Regular	31.0
Old Gold	Regular	30.9

Filters

Brand	Size	Tar (mg)
Old Gold	King	39.0
L&M	King	38.5
Hit Parade	King	36.3
Marlboro	King	34.4
Parliament	King	34.1
Salem	King	33.7
Winston	King	32.6
L&M	Regular	31.1
Kool	King	30.4
Kent	King	30.4
Viceroy	King	30.2
Tareyton	King	27.1
Kent	Regular	25.6

The measurements showed that tar and nicotine levels of filtered cigarettes were higher or close to the levels of former unfiltered cigarettes. Cigarette manufacturers acted quickly and used the objective third party information, to advertise and compete over lower tar and nicotine. The next month Kent was written about again in Reader's Digest for their improved filter which lowered their tar content in their king and regular filtered cigarettes to 23.4 mg and 19.7 mg respectively. These lower tar levels were accompanied by advertisements that boasted:

KENT with revolutionary NEW Micronite Filter gives you significantly better filtration . . . Significantly less tars and nicotine . . . Than any other leading filter brand.

Each company developed brands with lower tar and nicotine ratings or filters that eliminated more tar.

The 1958 issue of Consumer's Digest again exhibits the tar levels and shows the across the board decreases in tar levels for almost every cigarette measured.

July 1958 Consumer’s Digest Tar Measurements and Comparisons

Brand	Size	Tar 1958 (mg)	Tar 1957 (mg)	% Change
Chesterfield	85 mm	38.7	41.1	-6%
Pall Mall	85 mm	37.1	38.6	-4%
Raleigh	85 mm	35.6	39.3	-9%
Phillip Morris	80 mm	35.4	40.8	-13%
Tareyton	85 mm	34.3	36.6	-6%
Cavalier	80 mm	31.1	42.8 was 85 mm	-27%
Chesterfield	70 mm	30.6	32.7	-6%
Phillip Morris	70 mm	28.9	35.3	-18%
Camel	70 mm	28.7	31.0	-7%
Lucky Strike	70 mm	28.6	31.5	-9%
Old Gold Straights	80 mm	24.5	41.7 was 85 mm	-41%
Sano	70 mm	23.1	Not included	N/A
Old Gold Straights	70 mm	22.4	30.9	-28%

Companies successfully reduced tar and nicotine in all brands as seen by the sales-weighted tar and nicotine content decreasing 40% between mid 1957 and the end of 1959.

== Promotions of the Derby ==
During the course of the Tar Derby numerous companies launched new products or altered their existing products to gain position in tar ratings. Several companies used the tar ratings or noted tar reduction in their advertisements.

Company	Year	Product	Quote	Reference
United States Tobacco Company	1956	King Sano	"No cigarette that relies on a filter alone comes even close to KING SANO in reducing nicotine and tars!"	
Liggett and Myers	1958		"L&M is Low in tar with More taste to it"	
Brown & Williamson	1959	Life	"New Life's exclusive Millecel Super Filter absorbs for more tar and nicotine than any other filter. Only new Life with pure tobacco taste filters best by far . . . To give you far less tar and nicotine."	
Phillip Morris	1959	Parliament	"The most important 1/4 inch in smoking today Parliament is not the only cigarette that does a good job of trapping nicotine and tar. But Parliament is the only leading high—filtration cigarette that recesses its filter 1/4 inch to prevent filter feedback on your lips and tongue."	
Lorillard		Old Gold Straight	"Naturally reduced in nicotine"	

== The end of the Derby ==
The end of the tar derby in 1959 resulted from discussions between FTC Chairman Earl W. Kinter and several big tobacco company presidents. The parties came to an agreement to discontinue use of tar or nicotine levels in advertisements.

== See also ==
- Burger Wars
- Cola Wars
