= Schweppes Cola =

Brand of cola

- Type: Cola
- Manufacturer: Dr Pepper Snapple Group (formerly Dr Pepper/Seven Up)
- Origin: Italy, Switzerland, Australia and United States
- Introduced: 1985; 40 years ago
- Discontinued: 2000; 25 years ago in Australia
- Color: Caramel
- Flavour: Cola
- Variants: Diet Schweppes Cola
- Related products: RC Cola

Schweppes Cola is a brand of cola produced by Schweppes.

It was primarily available in Australia, but it was eventually made available elsewhere. It was sold in Japan by the Asahi Soft Drinks company from at least 1992 until 1997.

The taste is similar to the now-defunct Count Cola. The product was widely available in supermarkets and small take-away food outlets. In Australia, the product was discontinued when Schweppes obtained a license to produce Pepsi products in Australia. Schweppes Cola is currently owned and distributed by Dr Pepper Snapple Group. Today, the product can be found in Canada and other countries.
