= List of PepsiCo brands =

This is an alphabetical list of PepsiCo brands. It lists licensed trademarks, partnerships, including those in only certain markets, and products, split into foodtypes.

== Trademarks ==
- 7 Up (Maintains manufacturer rights internationally; while Keurig Dr.Pepper, Inc. maintains manufacturer rights in the US)
- Agousha (Russia)
- Alvalle (Spain)
- AMP Energy
- Aquafina
- Aquafina Flavorsplash
- Aunt Jemima/Pearl Milling Company
- Baconzitos (Brazil) (Main company is listed as Elma Chips. This product along with the company's other products are seemingly discontinued as the Elma Chips website only offers a link of contact and a Terms of Privacy page. These products can still be found from 3rd party online sites, but may vary in price due to availability)
- Bluebird (New Zealand)
- Cap'n Crunch
- Cheetos
- Cheetos Crunchy
- Chester's
- Chipsy (Egypt, Serbia)
- Chudo
- Cracker Jack
- Crush (PepsiCo maintains distributor rights in the North American region, but does not own the brand.)
- Diet Mountain Dew
- Diet Mug
- Diet Pepsi
- Diet 7UP (only outside of the United States)
- Domik v Derevne (Russia)
- Doritos
- Duyvis (Netherlands)
- Elma Chips (Brazil)
- Emperador (Mexico)
- Evervess (Russia)
- Fandangos (Brazil) (Possibly discontinued due to the brand's website resulting in a 404 Error when visiting)
- Frito-Lay
- Fritos
- Fruktoviy Sad (Russia) (Possibly discontinued due to the parent company Lebedyansky's website has been archived for over a decade)
- Frustyle (Russia) (Possibly discontinued due to the parent company Lebedyansky's website has been archived for over a decade)
- G2
- Gatorade
- Gatorade Zero
- Grandma's
- Imunele (Russia)
- Izze
- Ivi (Albania, Greece, Cyprus, Serbia)
- Kas
- KhrusTeam (Russia)
- Kurkure (India, Bangladesh, Pakistan)
- Lay's
- Lehar (India) (Pepsico India has converted Lehar to other brands such as Lay's and Kurkure starting in 2016)
- Life
- Lifewater
- Lubimy (Russia)
- Manzanita Sol
- Marias Gamesa
- Matutano (Spain, Portugal) (Producer and Distributor)
- Marbo Product (Serbia)
- Mirinda
- Miss Vickie's
- Mountain Dew
- Mountain Dew Baja Blast
- Mountain Dew Citrus Blast
- Mountain Dew Code Red
- Mountain Dew LiveWire
- Mountain Dew Voltage
- Mountain Dew Game Fuel
- Mountain Dew Kickstart
- Mug
- Munchies
- Naked
- Near East
- Nobati (Georgia)
- O.N.E.
- Paso de los Toros (Argentina, Uruguay)
- Pasta Roni
- Pepsi
- Pepsi Max
- Pepsi Next
- Pepsi Zero Sugar
- Pioneer Foods
- Punica
- Propel
- Quaker
- Quaker Chewy
- Rice-A-Roni
- Rockstar (drink)
- Rold Gold
- Rosquinhas Mabel (Brazil)
- Ruffles
- Russkiy Dar (Russia)
- Sabra
- Sabritas
- Sakata (Australia)
- Saladitas
- Sandora (Ukraine)
- Santitas
- Shani
- Sierra Mist (discontinued in favor of Starry)
- Simba (Southern Africa)
- Smartfood
- Smith's (Australia)
- Snack a Jacks
- Sodastream
- SoBe
- SoBe Lifewater
- SoBe V Water
- Sonric’s
- Stacy’s
- Starry
- Stiksy (Brazil)
- Sting
- SunChips
- Tonus
- Tostitos
- Trop 50
- Tropicana
- Tropicana Farmstand
- Tropicana Pure Premium
- Tropicana Twister
- Twisties (Oceania Region)
- Vesely Molochnik
- Walkers (United Kingdom)
- Yedigün (Turkey)

== Licensed and joint partnership trademarks ==
- Dole (for bottled fruit juice beverages)
- Lipton (Under the PepsiCo & Unilever joint venture "Pepsi Lipton Tea" for Lipton's Ready to Drink beverages. Not to be confused with Lipton Teas and Infusions owned by CVC Capital Partners after 2022 purchase from Unilever)
- Starbucks (Formed a joint venture in 1994 to create the North American Coffee Partnership (NACP), which handles Starbucks' glass and canned beverages)
- Yum! Brands (Spun-off into its own brand in the late 1990's. Has a lifetime contract with PepsiCo to serve Pepsi beverages exclusively)

== Products ==
- Breakfast Bars
  - Quaker Chewy Granola Bars
  - Quaker Chewy Granola Cocoa Bars
  - Quaker Chewy Smashbars
  - Quaker Dipps Granola Bars
  - Quaker Oatmeal to Go Bars
  - Quaker Stila Bars
  - Quaker Yogurt Granola Bars
Coffee Drinks
- Starbucks DoubleShot
- Starbucks Frappucino
- Starbucks Iced Coffee
Energy Drinks
- AMP Energy
- Starbucks Refreshers
- SoBe
Cereal
- Cap'n Crunch Cereal
- King Vitaman Cereal
- Kretschmer Toasted Wheat Germ
- Quaker Life Cereal
- Mother's Ready-to-Eat & Hot Cereals
- Quaker Essentials
- Quaker Grits
- Quaker Instant Oatmeal
- Quaker Natural Granola Cereal
- Quaker Old Fashioned Oats
- Quaker Oh!s Cereal
- Quaker Puffed Rice
- Quaker Shredded Wheat Cereal
- Quaker Oatmeal Squares Cereal
- Quisp Cereal (Seemingly discontinued, or at least only released sparingly throughout the year in small batches)
Other
- AMP Energy Gum
- Aunt Jemima Mixes & Syrups (now Pearl Milling)
- Quaker Baking Mixes
- Sabra Hummus
- Tropicana
Rice Snacks
- Quaker Large Rice Cakes
- Quaker Mini Delights
- Quaker Quakes
- Quaker Tortillaz
Side Dishes
- Near East Side Dishes
- Pasta Roni Side Dishes
- Rice-A-Roni Side Dishes
Snacks
- Baked! Cheetos Snacks
- Baked! Doritos Tortilla Chips
- Baked! Lay's Potato Crisps
- Baked! Ruffles Potato Chips
- Baked! Tostitos Tortilla Chips
- Baken-Ets Chicharrones
- Cheetos Cheese Flavored Snacks
- Chester's Flavored Fries
- Chester's Popcorn
- Cracker Jack Candy Coated Popcorn
- Doritos Tortilla Chips
- El Isleno Plaintain Chips
- Frito-Lay, Fritos, Lay's, and Tostitos Dips & Salsas
- Frito-Lay Nuts & Seeds
- Fritos Corn Chips
- Funyuns Onion Flavored Rings
- Gamesa Cookies and Wafers
- Grandma's Cookies
- Hickory Sticks
- Hostess Potato Chips
- Lay's Kettle Cooked Potato Chips
- Lay's Kurkure
- Lay's Potato Chips
- Lay's Stax Potato Crisps
- Lay's Wavy Potato Chips
- Maui Style Potato Chips
- Miss Vickie's Potato Chips
- Munchies Snack Crackers
- Munchies Snack Mix
- Munchos Potato Crisps
- Natural Cheetos
- Natural Lay's
- Natural Ruffles
- Natural Tostitos
- Nut Harvest Nuts
- Rold Gold Pretzels
- Ruffles Potato Chips
- Sabritones Puffed Wheat Snacks
- Santitas Tortille Chips
- Smartfood Popcorn
- Smartfood Popcorn Clusters
- Spitz Seeds
- Stacy's Pita
- SunChips Multigrain Snacks
- Tasali Snack Foods - in Saudi Arabia
- Tostito's Artisan Recipes Tortilla Chips
- Tostito's Tortilla Chips
Soft Drinks (original Pepsi brands)
- 7 Up (Maintains manufacturer rights internationally; while Keurig Dr.Pepper, Inc. maintains manufacturer rights in the US)
- Diet Mountain Dew
- Mountain Dew
- Mountain Dew Throwback
- Crush (Not owned by PepsiCo, but is a distributor)
- Dr Pepper
- Pepsi
- Pepsi Atom
- Diet Pepsi
- Pepsi Zero Sugar
- Pepsi Twist
- Pepsi Blue
- Pepsi Pink (Limited edition run in 2011 and 2014)
- Pepsi Gold (Limited edition sold for the 2006 FIFA World Cup)
- Pepsi Green
- Pepsi Black
- Pepsi White
- Pepsi Salty Watermelon
- Pepsi Azuki
- Pepsi Ice Cucumber
- Pepsi Shiso
- Pepsi Mont Blanc
- Pepsi Edge
- Pepsi One
- Pepsi Next
- Pepsi Wild Cherry
- Diet Wild Cherry Pepsi
- Caffeine Free Pepsi
- Diet Caffeine Free Pepsi
- Diet Pepsi Lime
- Caffeine Free Mountain Dew
- Caffeine Free Diet Mountain Dew
- Mountain Dew Livewire
- Mountain Dew Code Red
- Diet Mountain Dew Code Red
- Lipton Brisk Lemon
- Lipton Brisk Sweet Tea
- Mountain Dew Voltage
- Mountain Dew White Out
- Diet Lipton Brisk WL
- Lipton Brisk Fruit Punch
- Lipton Brisk Lemonade
- Poppi Classic Cola
- Poppi Root Beer
- Poppi Watermelon
- Poppi Cherry Limeade
- Poppi Grape
- Poppi Raspberry Rose
- Poppi Ginger Lime
- Poppi Lemon Lime
- Poppi Wild Berry
- Poppi Orange Cream
- Poppi Cherry Cola
- Poppi Strawberry Lemon
- Poppi Orange
- Poppi Doc Pop
- Poppi Cream Soda
- Poppi Alpine Blast (citrus)
- Poppi Cranberry Fizz (seasonal)
- PoppibPunch Pop (seasonal)
- Pepsi Throwback
- Mug
- Diet Mug
- Mirinda
- Tropicana Products
- Starry
- Starry Zero Sugar
- Bubly sparkling water
Sports Nutrition
- Gatorade G Series Prime 01
- Gatorade Thirst Quencher - G Series Perform 02
- Gatorade G Series Recover 03
- Gatorade G2
- Gatorade Natural
- Gatorade G2 Natural
- Gatorade G Series FIT Prime 01 Pre-Workout Fuel
- Gatorade G Series FIT Perform 02 Workout Hydration
- Gatorade G Series FIT Recover 03 Post-Workout Recovery
- Gatorade G Series PRO 01 Nutrition Shake
- Gatorade G Series PRO 01 Nutrition Bar
- Gatorade G Series PRO 01 Carbohydrate Energy Formula
- Gatorade G Series PRO 02 Endurance Formula
- Gatorade G Series PRO 02 Perform Gatorlytes
- Gatorade G Series PRO 03 Protein Recovery Shake
- Gatorade G Series PRO Prime +
- Gatorade G Series PRO Recover +
Bottled Water
- Aquafina
- Aquafina FlavorSplash
- Driftwell, a water with added L-theanine to encourage sleep
- Propel Zero
- SoBe Lifewater

== Largest brands by sales ==
Largest PepsiCo Brands based on 2009 retail sales
Brand
Pepsi
Mountain Dew
Lay's potato chips
Tropicana beverages
Diet Pepsi
Gatorade
7 Up (outside U.S.)
Doritos tortilla chips
Mirinda
Quaker foods and snacks
Cheetos
Lipton teas (PepsiCo/Unilever partnership)
Ruffles potato chips
Aquafina bottled water
Pepsi Max
Fritos corn chips
Tostitos tortilla chips
Sierra Mist
Walkers potato crisps
Source: 2009 PepsiCo Annual Report $0 $5b $10b $15b $20b

== See also ==
- PepsiCo
