= Pepsi Philippines =

Philippine subsidiary of PepsiCo

Pepsi-Cola Products Philippines, Inc.
- Type: Subsidiary, Public
- Traded as: PSE: PIP
- Founded: 1989; 37 years ago
- Headquarters: 26th Floor, Filinvest Axis Tower, Two Building Northgate Cyberzone, Filinvest City, Alabang, Muntinlupa City, Metro Manila, Philippines
- Area served: Philippines
- Key people: Phyo Phyu Noe (President and CEO)
- Products: Soft drink
- Parent: Lotte Chilsung; PepsiCo
- Website: www.pepsiphilippines.com

Pepsi-Cola Products Philippines, Inc. (PCPPI) (PSE: PIP) is a Philippines-based company engaged in the bottling and distribution of PepsiCo beverages in the Philippines since 1989.

== History ==
On October 16, 1946, John Clarkin acquired a franchise to bottle and distribute Pepsi-Cola in the Philippines, establishing Pepsi-Cola Bottling Company of the Philippine Islands Ltd. (later renamed Pepsi-Cola Bottling Company of the Philippines, Inc.). Clarkin was a former executive of the Pepsi-Cola Company who came to the Philippines as a member of the US Air Force during the close of World War II. In the beginning, the company imported Pepsi-Cola until 1947, when its first bottling plant was established in Quezon City. After Clarkin returned to the United States in 1957, Pepsi-Cola International took over the Philippine operations.

In 1983, the Philippine operations became a branch of PepsiCo's New York office - PepsiCo, Inc. (Philippine branch) - and operated until 1985. Between 1985 and 1989, Pepsi-Cola Distributors of the Philippines, Inc., a group identified with Filipino businessmen Ernest Escaler and Eduardo Cojuangco Jr., took over the Philippine franchise.

Pepsi-Cola Products Philippines, Inc. (PCPPI) was established in 1989 as Premier Beverages by Luis Lorenzo, Sr. to acquire the bottling and distribution rights to PepsiCo beverages in the Philippines.

In 1997, the Guoco Group acquired Lorenzo's holdings in PCPPI. Under Guoco management, ₱700 million was spent in 1998 to upgrade the facilities of PCPPI. In 2000, PepsiCo paid ₱2 billion to the Guoco Group to acquire a 33% stake in PCPPI. News reports cited the rationale was to ensure PepsiCo had a continuing market for its concentrates, even if it meant infusing money into its licensed bottlers.

PCPPI became listed in the Philippine Stock Exchange in 2008.

In September 2010, Korean-based Lotte Chilsung Beverage Company Ltd. acquired 34% of PCPPI. The acquisition made Lotte Chilsung the largest shareholder in PCPPI. Lotte Chilsung agreed to pay P4.447 billion to buy the 1.27 billion shares from the Guoco Group. In 2013, Lotte Chilsung increased its stake to 39%. As of March 2013, Netherlands-based Quaker Global Investments B.V. is the company's second largest shareholder with 29.5%.

In 2023, Lotte Chilsung raised its stake 73.6% and completed its acquisition of Pepsi Philippines.

== Recent developments ==
In June 2013, PCPPI announced that the company would undertake the expansion of its production and distribution capabilities. PCPPI wanted to add three new lines in its existing manufacturing plants in Makati, Muntinlupa, Cebu City and Davao City within the year and open a new facility in Santo Tomas, Batangas. It also hoped to expand its current distribution network of 500,000 locations by about 12% within the year. About 70% of the company's current sales come from carbonated drinks with the balance coming from non-carbonated drinks.

The company ventured into the manufacture of Cheetos snacks in the Philippines from 2015 to 2019.

In January 2021, PCPPI opened its new facility in Santo Tomas, Batangas. In June 2021, PCPPI relocated its headquarters from its manufacturing plant in Tunasan, Muntinlupa to Northgate Cyberzone in Alabang, Muntinlupa. Also In Ayala Triangle Gardens Tower 2 In Paseo De Roxas Cor Makati Ave In Makati City

== Brands ==
Carbonated:

- Pepsi (formerly known as Pepsi Cola)
- Pepsi Zero Sugar Lime (formerly known as Pepsi Zero Sugar/Pepsi Max)
- 7 Up
- 7 Up Zero Sugar (formerly known as Diet 7 Up)
- Mountain Dew
- Mountain Dew Zero Sugar (formerly known as Diet Mountain Dew)
- Mirinda (1.5L only)
- Mug
- Lotte Milkis
- Lipton Soda (formerly known as Lipton Ice Tea Sparkling)

Non-carbonated:

- Tropicana Twister
- Lipton
- Gatorade
- Gatorade No Sugar (formerly known as Gatorade Low Carb)
- Sting Energy Drink
- Premier Drinking Water

Snack foods:

- Cheetos
- Doritos
- Fritos
- Lay's
- Ruffles
- Lay's Stax
- Smartfood
- Tostitos
- PopCorners
- Lay's Crispy Fries

Other:

- Quaker Instant Oatmeal

Alcoholic Beverages:

- Hard Mountain Dew
- Chum Churum Saero
- Chum Churum Soonhari

Discontinued:

- Pepsi Cola (formerly known as Pepsi)
- Pepsi Zero Sugar/Pepsi Max (replaced with Pepsi Zero Sugar Lime since 2023)
- Pepsi Light/Diet Pepsi (replaced with Pepsi Zero Sugar/Pepsi Zero Sugar Lime since 2018)
- Pepsi Twist (replaced with Pepsi Zero Sugar Lime since 2023)
- Diet Pepsi Twist (replaced with Pepsi Zero Sugar Lime since 2023)
- Pepsi Zero Sugar Vanilla
- Pepsi Ice
- Pepsi Fire
- Pepsi Pogi
- Pepsi X Energy Cola
- Pepsi Blue
- Pepsi Pinas
- 7 Up Frootz
- Diet 7 Up (replaced with 7 Up Zero Sugar since 2023)
- Mirinda
- Diet Mountain Dew (replaced with Mountain Dew Zero Sugar since 2023)
- Mountain Dew Code Red
- Mountain Dew Livewire
- Mountain Dew Pitch Black
- Mountain Dew Blue Shock
- Mountain Dew Ice (replaced with Mountain Dew Zero Sugar since 2023)
- Lipton Ice Tea Sparkling (replaced with Lipton Soda since 2025)
- Teem
- Lotte Let's Be
- Propel Vitamin Water
- Ovaltine
- Gatorade Low Carb (replaced with Gatorade No Sugar since 2021)
- G Active by Gatorade
- Tropicana Frutz Sparkling
- Aquafina Purified Drinking Water
- Quaker Good Start
- Nutriklim SIPS
- Knick Knacks
- Tropicana Coconut Water

== Controversy ==
The Pepsi Number Fever, also known as the 349 incident, was a promotion held by PepsiCo in the Philippines in 1992, which led to riots and the deaths of at least 5 people.

== See also ==
- List of Ig Nobel Prize winners
- Pepsi Hotshots (PBA team, 1990–1996)
