= List of Mountain Dew flavors and varieties =

Mountain Dew, a citrus-flavored carbonated soft drink owned by PepsiCo, has had numerous branded flavor variants since the original formula's creation in 1940. Notable variants include Diet Mountain Dew, Baja Blast, Code Red, LiveWire, Voltage, Major Melon, and Spark.

== Flavors ==
=== Current ===
Name	Dates of production	Notes	Picture
Mountain Dew	1948–present	A citrus-flavored soda developed in the 1940s by Barney and Ally Hartman, beverage bottlers in Tennessee. A revised formula was created by Bill Bridgforth in 1959. High-fructose corn syrup replaced sugar in the 1990s, though today there is a modified variant made with cane sugar known as Mountain Dew Real Sugar. A zero sugar variant was introduced in 2020.	
Diet Mountain Dew	1988–present	A low-calorie variant first introduced in 1988, replacing the similar drink "Sugar Free Mountain Dew". In 2006, Diet Mountain Dew was reformulated with a new "Tuned Up Taste", using a blend of sucralose, aspartame, and acesulfame potassium as sweeteners. The previous formulation was sweetened exclusively with aspartame. It is notable for including orange juice in the recipe.	
Diet Caffeine-Free Mountain Dew	1989–present	A variant without sugar or caffeine, available in parts of the United States.	
Mountain Dew Code Red	2001–present	A cherry variant introduced in 2001 and the first widely successful flavor extension. Also available in zero sugar and formerly diet.	
Mountain Dew LiveWire	2003–present	An orange variant introduced in 2003 as a limited-edition flavor for the summer. In 2005, after two years of limited summer releases, it became a permanent addition to the product line. It is available in some regions of the United States.	
Mountain Dew Baja Blast	2004–present (fountain, exclusive to Taco Bell); 2014–2016, 2018–present (retail)	A tropical lime variant introduced in 2004 exclusively as a fountain drink at Taco Bell restaurants. On May 5, 2014, Baja Blast received a limited release in stores by popular demand. In April 2015, Baja Blast released in retail stores for a limited time, accompanied by an in-store release of sister flavor Sangrita Blast. In 2016, the flavor was re-released for the "DEWcision" contest for a limited time, where it lost to Pitch Black. The drink received reoccurring, seasonal summer retail releases from 2018 onwards. In January 2024, in celebration of the flavor's 20th anniversary, Pepsi announced the drink would remain on shelves year-round. More options became available in 2024 and 2025, including 1L and 2L bottles. A diet version was briefly offered in Taco Bell fountains in 2015. A zero sugar version was introduced in 2019, and has since seen packaged releases alongside original Baja Blast.	
Mountain Dew Voltage	2008–present	A blue raspberry/citrus variant with ginseng. It is the winner of the first DEWmocracy promotion and was released in 2008.	
Mountain Dew Real Sugar	2009–present	A variant containing natural sugar in place of high-fructose corn syrup released during mid-2009 under the name Mountain Dew Throwback. It was initially re-released for brief periods (generally 8–12 weeks at a time), including a 2nd wave from December 2009 – February 2010 and a 3rd wave in Summer/Fall 2010. A fourth limited production run began in March 2011, lasting for eight weeks, before it became a permanent addition. In 2020, Mountain Dew Throwback was rebranded as Mountain Dew Real Sugar, with a new design using the 1980s Mountain Dew logo, with the words "Real Sugar" in a similar font. Although Mountain Dew Real Sugar was mostly discontinued in 2023, It is still available in glass bottles in some markets in the United States.	
Mountain Dew Goji Citrus Strawberry	2017–present	A goji/strawberry/citrus variant released in 2017 exclusively at select convenience stores and college campuses.	
Mountain Dew Voo-Dew	2019–2024 (fall only)	An annually released mystery-flavored Mountain Dew released for the Halloween season. The flavor of each yearly release is a mystery, traditionally being revealed on Halloween. The flavors are typically based on candy flavors. There have been a total of six releases each year between 2019 and 2024.	Voo-Dew (2022)
Mountain Dew Baja Cabo Citrus	2025 (limited time offer); 2026-present	Tropical punch flavored Dew, part of the Baja Blast line.	
Mountain Dew Trolli (Cherry-Lemon)	2025 (limited time offer)	"Cherry-lemon" flavored Dew, part of a collaboration with Trolli candy. Only available in a sugar-free version (standard caffeine content). The Trolli bottle and label utilized the 2025 re-brand labelling.	framless
Mountain Dew Trolli (Mango Pineapple Punch)	2026-present (limited time offer)	Mango pineapple punch flavored Dew, also part of a collaboration with Trolli candy. It is also sold in bottles at participating Pizza Hut locations.	
Dirty Mountain Dew	2026–present	A dirty soda-inspired flavor that blends Mountain Dew and cream soda. It is also available in zero sugar.	This is the logo for Dirty mountain dew.

=== Exclusives ===
Name	Dates of production	Exclusive to	Notes	Picture
Mountain Dew Berry Monsoon	2018–2023	Sam's Club	A berry lime variant exclusive to Sam's Club locations in May 2018 in the United States. It was released in limited quantities in the United States on June 28, 2018, before becoming more widely available in stores in July. Also available in zero sugar.	
Mountain Dew Sweet Lightning	2019–present	KFC	A peach variant exclusive to KFC restaurants from late March 2019. It was first revealed via a trademark that was filed on March 4, 2019. Its tagline is "DEW charged with Natural & Artificial Sweet Peach & Smooth Honey".	
Mountain Dew Maui Burst	2019–2026	Dollar General	A pineapple variant exclusive to Dollar General. Originally intended to be a limited-time flavor, it was re-released as a permanent flavor by popular demand in 2020, but still exclusive to Dollar General.	
Mountain Dew Frost Bite	2020–2025	Walmart	A honeydew/melon variant exclusive to Walmart stores, released in March 2020 as a permanent flavor. A zero sugar variant was introduced in 2021. This flavor was discontinued in May 2025.	
Mountain Dew Dragon Fruit	2025-present	Walmart	A dragon fruit variant exclusive to Walmart stores, released on June 16, 2025 as a permanent flavor.	
Mountain Dew Atomic Blue	2020–2024	Sheetz	An "electrifying lemonade" variant exclusive to select Sheetz and Kum & Go fountains released in May 2020.	
Mountain Dew Southern Shock	2020–2022	Bojangles	A fruit punch variant exclusive to Bojangles.	
Dewgarita	2020–2022	Red Lobster	A margarita made with Mountain Dew. First official alcoholic Mountain Dew product.	
Mountain Dew Vibe	2021–present	Which Wich?	A lemon variant exclusive to Which Wich restaurants.	
Mountain Dew Thrashed Apple	2021–2024	Kroger family of stores	A crisp apple variant exclusive to Kroger-owned stores released in September 2021.	
Mountain Dew Uproar	2021–2023	Food Lion	A strawberry-kiwi variant exclusive to Food Lion.	
Mountain Dew Dark Berry Bash	2021–present	Applebee's, Cosmic Wings	A blue raspberry and blackberry variant exclusive to Applebee's restaurants and their Cosmic Wings virtual brand.	
Mountain Dew Legend	2022–2025	Buffalo Wild Wings	A blackberry lime variant exclusive to Buffalo Wild Wings. Also available in the "Legendary Long Island" cocktail, combining Mountain Dew Legend with vodka, rum, tequila, triple sec, and lemon sour. This flavor was discontinued in August 2025.	
Mountain Dew Purple Thunder	2022–2026 (bottled and canned) 2026-present (Circle K fountain)	Circle K, Kroger family of stores Couche Tard (Canada)	A blackberry and plum variant exclusive to Circle K, Kroger, and Couche Tard.	
Mountain Dew Overdrive	2022–2025	Casey's	A citrus punch variant with "hints of mango, raspberry and lime flavors."	
Mountain Dew Infinite Swirl	2024–present	7-Eleven, Speedway, Stripes	A pineapple strawberry flavor exclusive to 7-Eleven owned convenience stores.	
Mountain Dew Pitch Black	2004, 2011, 2023 (limited time release) 2016–2019 ("DEWcision") 2023-2025 (Canada) 2024–present (fountain exclusive)	7-Eleven, Speedway	A dark citrus punch variant first released in fall 2004, originally described as 'dark grape'. Pitch Black was re-released in Slurpee form as a limited edition flavor during the 2006 Halloween season. Pitch Black was re-released in 2011 as a part of the "Back by Popular DEWmand" promotion. Pitch Black was made available in fountains at Speedway gas stations as of 2016, and served as part of the "DEWcision" contest, where it won over Baja Blast and was added to the core lineup. In 2019, it was discontinued due to poor sales. In November 2022, PepsiCo announced the flavor would be re-released in January 2023 for a limited time, along with a new Zero Sugar version. Pitch Black was also made permanently available in Canada at this time, but was discontinued in 2025. In October 2024, the flavor returned to fountains in Speedways and 7-Elevens across the U.S. The flavor is also permanent in Malaysia.	
Mountain Dew Baja Midnight	2025-present	Taco Bell	A passionfruit flavor, exclusive to Taco Bell restaurants. Part of the Baja Blast line. A zero sugar version was released in 2026.	
Mountain Dew Mango Rush	2025 (limited time offer); 2026-present (limited time offer)	Little Caesars	Dew with a blast of natural and artificial Mango Sweet Heat flavor	

=== Kickstart ===
Name	Dates of production	Notes
Mountain Dew Kickstart Orange Citrus	2013–present	An orange variant released on February 25, 2013, advertised to have caffeine and electrolytes to provide energy for the morning. This flavor was available as a fountain drink at Taco Bell locations. Mountain Dew Kickstart Orange Citrus appeared in Australian stores in April 2017.
Mountain Dew Kickstart Fruit Punch	2013–present	A fruit punch variant released on February 25, 2013, advertised to have caffeine, B vitamins, and electrolytes to provide energy for the morning.
Mountain Dew Kickstart Black Cherry	2014–present	A black cherry variant released in January 2014, advertised to contain caffeine and electrolytes to provide energy for the evening. In March 2014, select Taco Bell locations began offering "Mountain Dew Kickstart Freeze", a slushie version of Black Cherry Mountain Dew Kickstart. It replaced the Distortion Freeze but was discontinued in October 2014 and was replaced with the Starburst Strawberry Freeze.
Mountain Dew Kickstart Limeade	2014–2017	A limeade variant released alongside Black Cherry. In 2017, the flavor was discontinued in the United States to make room for new variants.
Mountain Dew Kickstart Pineapple Orange Mango	2015–present	A pineapple/orange/mango variant that contains Coconut Water.
Mountain Dew Kickstart Blood Orange	2016–2019	A blood orange variant released in early 2016 that contains the antioxidants vitamins C and E.
Mountain Dew Kickstart Hydrating Watermelon	2016–2019	A watermelon variant that contains coconut water.
Mountain Dew Kickstart Blueberry Pomegranate	2016–2021	A blueberry/pomegranate variant released in early 2016 that contains antioxidants - vitamins C and E.
Mountain Dew Kickstart Midnight Grape	2016-2025	A grape variant released in 2016 that contains 5% juice.
Mountain Dew Kickstart Raspberry Citrus	2017–2021	A raspberry/citrus variant released in the first quarter of 2017 that contains coconut water.
Mountain Dew Kickstart Mango Lime	2017–2021	A mango/lime variant released in the first quarter of 2017 that contains 5% juice.
Mountain Dew Kickstart Original	2018–2019	A variant with the flavor of original Mountain Dew released in early 2018.
Mountain Dew Kickstart Ultra	2018–2019	A low-calorie version of Kickstart Original released in early 2018.
Mountain Dew Kickstart Strawberry Start-Up	2023–2025	Strawberry lemon Kickstart introduced in 2023.

=== Game Fuel (formerly Amp Game Fuel) ===
Name	Dates of production	Notes
Charged Cherry Burst	2019–2023	A cherry variant, launched as 'Amp Game Fuel' in 2019.
Charged Berry Blast	2019–2023	A berry variant, launched as 'Amp Game Fuel' in 2019.
Charged Original Dew	2019–2023	A variant based on the original Mountain Dew, launched as 'Amp Game Fuel' in 2019.
Charged Tropical Strike	2019–2023	A tropical variant, launched as 'Amp Game Fuel' in 2019.
Charged Orange Storm	2019–2023	An orange variant launched as 'Amp Game Fuel' in 2019 with the launch of Call of Duty: Modern Warfare.
Zero Charged Watermelon Shock	2020–2021	A zero-sugar watermelon variant that was phased out in late 2021.
Zero Charged Raspberry Lemonade	2020–2021, 2022	A zero-sugar raspberry lemonade variant. Initially phased out in late 2021, before returning in September 2022.
Courageous Sherbet	2021	A rainbow sherbet variant, also available in zero sugar. Released for a limited time, co-branded with Internet streamer CouRageJD.
Championship Citrus Cherry	2022	A re-release of original Citrus Cherry Game Fuel flavor. Released for a limited time, co-branded with Internet streamer Dr Disrespect.

=== Mountain Dew Energy (formerly Mountain Dew Rise) ===
Name	Dates of production	Notes
Pomegranate Blue Burst	March 2021 – December 2023	A blueberry pomegranate low sugar energy drink with 180 mg of caffeine.
Strawberry Melon Spark	March 2021 – December 2023	A strawberry melon low sugar energy drink with 180 mg of caffeine.
Berry Blitz	March 2021 – January 2022	An acai berry low sugar energy drink with 180 mg of caffeine.
Tropical Sunrise	March 2021 – February 2023	A tropical pineapple low sugar energy drink with 180 mg of caffeine.
Peach Mango Dawn	March 2021 – February 2023	A peach-mango low sugar energy drink with 180 mg of caffeine.
Orange Breeze	March 2021 – December 2023	An orange low sugar energy drink with 180 mg of caffeine. At the start of 2023, Orange Breeze became a regional flavor and was not available in most markets.
Cherry Lime Lift	January 2022 – December 2023	A low sugar cherry and lime flavored energy drink.
Baja Blast	2022 (limited time offer)	Baja Blast flavored energy drink.
Code Red	2022 (limited time offer)	Mountain Dew Code Red flavored energy drink.
Pitch Black	2023 (limited time offer)	Limited-time release, based on Mountain Dew Pitch Black.
Major Melon	2023 (limited time offer)	Limited-time release, based on Mountain Dew Major Melon.

=== Hard Mountain Dew ===
Name	Dates of production	Notes
Hard Mountain Dew	2022–present	An alcoholic variant developed with the Boston Beer Company. Alcoholic version of the original Mountain Dew flavor. Contains 5% alcohol by volume and has no caffeine or sugar. Soft-launched in February 2022 in Iowa, Tennessee, and Florida.
Hard Mountain Dew Black Cherry	2022–present	A black cherry alcoholic variant. Contains 5% alcohol by volume and has no caffeine or sugar. Soft-launched in February 2022 in Iowa, Tennessee, and Florida.
Hard Mountain Dew Watermelon	2022–present	A watermelon alcoholic variant. Contains 5% alcohol by volume and has no caffeine or sugar. Soft-launched in February 2022 in Iowa, Tennessee, and Florida.
Hard Mountain Dew Baja Blast	2022–present	A Baja Blast-flavored alcoholic variant. Announced in early 2022, separately from the other three flavors. Contains 5% alcohol by volume and has no caffeine or sugar. Soft-launched in February 2022 in Iowa, Tennessee, and Florida.
Hard Mountain Dew LiveWire	2023–present	Alcoholic drink based on Mountain Dew LiveWire. First post-launch addition to the lineup.
Hard Mountain Dew Baja Blast Pineapple	2023 (limited time offer), 2024-present	Pineapple-flavored hard Dew offered as part of the Baja Blast variety pack.
Hard Mountain Dew Baja Blast Punch	2023 (limited time offer), 2024-present	Tropical punch-flavored hard Dew offered as part of the Baja Blast variety pack.
Hard Mountain Dew Baja Blast Mango	2023 (limited time offer), 2024-present	Mango-flavored hard Dew offered as part of the Baja Blast variety pack.

=== Frozen beverages ===
Name	Dates of production	Notes
Mountain Dew Blue Shock Freeze	2001–present	A raspberry/citrus variant. Blue Shock was initially test-marketed in Chicago, but when sales did not meet expectations, it was released in 2002 in the U.S. exclusively as a Slurpee at 7-Eleven.
Mountain Dew Electric Charge	2014–present	A sour lemon variant released in U.S. convenience stores, including Sheetz.
Mountain Dew Game Fuel Berry Lime	2015–present	A berry/lime variant exclusively at 7-Eleven stores.

=== International variations ===
Name	Dates of production	Notes
Mountain Dew X-Treme	2010–present	A grape variant similar to "Pitch Black" released in Kuwait during December 2010 and later in Saudi Arabia. Later released in 2017 in Honduras with a similar design to Voltage.
Mountain Dew Energy/Citrus Blast	2010–present	A new line of Mountain Dew released in the U.K. in June 2010, originally in 500ml bottles, but as of February 2011 it has expanded to 440ml cans (normal and sugar free) and 1 Litre bottles. Mountain Dew Energy was released in Ireland in April 2011. Produced in a lemon and lime flavor, it has a higher caffeine content than Mountain Dew sold in the U.S., at 18 mg per 100ml, versus 91 mg per 20 fl oz in the U.S. version (which is ≈15.385 mg per 100ml). The U.K. version is produced with real sugar instead of high-fructose corn syrup, as with most other soft drinks in the U.K. Mountain Dew did initially launch in the U.K. and Ireland in 1996; however, it was discontinued in 1998 due to low sales. It is produced by Britvic in the U.K. In 2014, the "Energy" Wording was removed, so the drink was simply called "Mountain Dew" in the U.K. In early 2015, it was once again renamed, this time to "Mountain Dew Citrus Blast." It is still called Mountain Dew Energy in Italy.
Adrenaline Mountain Dew	2010–2015 (Poland); 2013–??? (Norway)	An energy variant that contains caffeine, taurine, guarana extract, ginseng, and vitamins B2 and B12. In August 2010, this new flavor was released in Poland. The drink was available in 250ml cans and 500ml black-tinted bottles (similar to Mountain Dew Energy's green-tinted bottles).
Mountain Dew Energised	2012–present	A caffeinated variant released in June 2012 in Australia, like Canada's relaunch a few months earlier. It was first introduced to Australian KFC restaurants and then spread to markets and convenience stores.
Mountain Dew Passionfruit Frenzy	2012–present	A passion fruit variant released in New Zealand on 15 October 2012.
Mountain Dew Supernova (Finland/Denmark)	2012–present	A raspberry-lemon variant.
Mountain Dew Electric Citrus	2015–present	A citrus variant released in Spain in 2015.
Mountain Dew Energy Game Fuel	September 2012 – January 2013 and September 2013 – January 2014	A limited-edition raspberry/citrus flavor released in the United Kingdom to promote the release of Halo 4 in 2012 and the Xbox One in 2013. Though it has a similar-colored bottle as the American cherry/citrus Game Fuel (see table above), it is an entirely different flavor.
AMP Energy — Powered by Mountain Dew (UK)	2013–2017	A citrus-flavored energy drink variant released under the 'AMP' brand in the U.K. in August 2013 by PepsiCo. Rather than being an entirely separate brand as is the case with its North American counterpart — the U.K. version of AMP Energy was released under the 'Mountain Dew' brand. It contains a higher caffeine content than Mountain Dew Energy at 31 mg/100ml and contains real sugar as is common with other British soft drinks. In 2017, the U.K. Mountain Dew Twitter page responded to a user, saying they have discontinued AMP to focus on their Citrus Blast flavor.
Mountain Dew Game Fuel (India)	2016–present	A green-colored variant of Mountain Dew Game Fuel launched in India on June 9, 2016.
Mountain Dew Blue Shock	2014–present (Malaysia); 2016–present (Philippines DEWmocracy)	A raspberry citrus variant released in 2014, as part of the DEWmocracy Malaysia promotion. Blue Shock was released in bottles and cans in Malaysia, joining the regular flavor, Pitch Black, and Live Wire. It also became a limited edition flavor for the Philippines for its own DEWmocracy promotion.
Mountain Dew Major Melon	2021–2025 (United States) 2021–present (Canada) 2022–present (Honduras, as Pink Drip)	A watermelon flavor released on January 4, 2021, as a permanent flavor in both regular and zero sugar varieties. Discontinued in 2025 in the United States. Sold in Honduras as Pink Drip.
Mountain Dew Summer Freeze	2023, 2025 (United States) 2024, 2025 (Canada) 2024–present (Honduras)	A summer flavor inspired by the taste of a bomb pop, with cherry, raspberry and lemon flavors. Also available in zero sugar. The drink was formerly a limited time flavor in the United States, but was introduced to lineups in Canada and Honduras.

=== Discontinued ===
Name	Dates of production	Notes	Picture
Caffeine-Free Mountain Dew	1976–2021	A caffeine-free variant of the original Mountain Dew flavor. Discontinued in the United States as of 2021. Caffeine-free variants of Mountain Dew were also sold in Australia and Canada as the standard, but in March and June 2012, they were reformulated with caffeine as Mountain Dew "Energized" and "Citrus Charge", respectively.	
Mountain Dew Red	1988	This flavor was described as tasting like fruit punch. This was the first new flavor other than the original citrus.	
Mountain Dew Sport	1989–1991	A Mountain Dew-flavored sports drink that was released in a limited number of U.S. regions in 1990 following initial test marketing in 1989. A two-calorie variant was released, as well as a diet version. All were short-lived, being discontinued in 1991.	
Mountain Dew Pitch Black II	2005	A "sequel" flavor released for the 2005 Halloween season, it was different from the original Pitch Black, as it had a sour grape flavor. The tagline was "Back with a sour bite." Unlike the original Pitch Black, this sequel was a marketing failure as it did not return to the markets at any form.	
Darth Dew	2005	A limited production tangy grape Slurpee flavor. It was available exclusively at 7-Eleven stores as part of a promotion for the theatrical release of Star Wars Episode III.	
Mountain Dew MDX	2005–2007	A Mountain Dew-flavored energy soda introduced in 2005 in 14-US-fluid-ounce (410 ml) bottles. In 2006, its packaging was changed to 20-US-fluid-ounce (590 ml) bottles. Its production was discontinued in 2007.	
Mountain Dew Game Fuel Citrus Cherry	2007, 2009, 2011–2017, 2023, 2024 (limited time release); 2018–2022 (Without Game Fuel advertising)	A citrus-cherry variant introduced in August 2007 for 12 weeks to promote the release of Halo 3. The flavor has received frequent re-releases as part of a Game Fuel promotion with special package designs promoting its associated video game. Games previously featured on Citrus Cherry packaging include World of Warcraft, Call of Duty: Modern Warfare 3, Halo 4, Dead Rising 3, Call of Duty: Advanced Warfare, Call of Duty: Black Ops III, Titanfall 2. From 2017 until early 2018, it was available in Arby's restaurant fountains across America. In October 2023, Halo announced the original version would be re-released in November to tie in with Halo Infinite.	Game Blast, an international version of Game Fuel Citrus Cherry
Mountain Dew Revolution	2008	A wild berry-flavored Mountain Dew with ginseng. One of the three "candidate flavor" finalists for DEWmocracy's "People's Dew" national vote. Revolution initially held the highest number of votes until the end of the promotion when it dropped to 3rd place and lost to Mountain Dew Voltage. In 2011, the "Mountain Dew Throwback Shack" offered a prize of "a hidden stash of Dew" which was revealed to be glass bottles of Revolution with lab labels on them.	
Mountain Dew Supernova	2008, 2011	A strawberry/melon flavor with ginseng. One of the three "candidate flavor" finalists for DEWmocracy's "People's Dew" national vote, it lost to Mountain Dew Voltage, finishing in 2nd place. This flavor was re-released as a part of the "Back by Popular DEWmand" promotion in early May 2011 and stayed on shelves through July. A diet variant was released as a "FanDEWmonium" flavor. It released in U.S. stores alongside Diet Mountain Dew Voltage on March 6, 2011, for eight weeks as a limited edition diet flavor. It won FanDEWmonium with 55% out of all votes, and became a permanent addition to the Diet Mountain Dew flavor line-up. It returned to shelves in February as part of the "Fuel the Frenzy" promotion, but was removed from shelves after 12 weeks due to poor sales. It was rereleased in Canada as a permanent flavour in 2026.	
Mountain Dew Game Fuel Alliance Blue	2009	A wild fruit punch flavor released alongside "Mountain Dew Game Fuel Horde Red" (Citrus Cherry Game Fuel) for a 10-week period in 2009. Like Horde Red, Alliance Blue was a promotional flavor for World of Warcraft.	
Diet Mountain Dew Ultra Violet	2009, 2011	A mixed berry-flavored Mountain Dew originally available for three months in 2009, it was the first flavor available exclusively in Diet. It was released on August 3, 2009, at a first-taste party in Brooklyn, New York. This flavor returned for the "FanDEWmonium" promotion but ultimately lost to Diet Mountain Dew Supernova, coming in sixth place and not making it into the final round. Its flavor has been compared to that of "Revolution" due to their berry-themed flavoring.	
Mountain Dew White Out	2010–2020	A smooth citrus variant part of the "DEWmocracy: Collective Intelligence" promotion with a limited release starting on April 19, 2010. Voting ended on June 14, and White Out won the campaign with 44% of the votes. It became a permanent flavor and was officially released that October. A Diet White Out was created for the FanDEWmonium promotion, which came in third place. Discontinued in the United States as of April 2020, although produced by some independent bottlers in the Midwest until 2023. Received a limited run in Canada in the summer of 2022.	
Mountain Dew Distortion	2010; 2013–2014 (Freeze)	A lime variant that was part of the second "DEWmocracy: Collective Intelligence" promotion. It lost to Mountain Dew White Out and came in 3rd place with only 16% of all votes. Due to its similarity in color to the original Mountain Dew, Distortion was packaged in a clear bottle with a black label (as opposed to the green plastic bottle with a green label used in the original Mountain Dew) in an attempt to avoid confusion. A Diet Distortion was created for the FanDEWmonium promotion, which came in 8th place, not making it to the final round. Beginning on September 26, 2013, select Taco Bell locations began offering "Mountain Dew Distortion Freeze", which was a slushie version of the Mountain Dew Distortion flavor available during 2010. It was discontinued at the beginning of March 2014 and was replaced with the Kickstart Freeze.	
Mountain Dew Typhoon	2010, 2011; 2013–2014 (Freeze); 2022 (Dew Store)	A strawberry/pineapple-flavored Mountain Dew. Part of the second Mountain Dew "DEWmocracy: Collective Intelligence" promotion. It lost to Mountain Dew White Out and came in 2nd place with 40% of all votes. Diet Typhoon was created for the FanDEWmonium promotion, which came in 5th place, not making it to the final round. It was announced on April 15, 2011, that Typhoon would return in May 2011 as part of the "Back by Popular DEWmand" promotion and it stayed on shelves in two-liter bottles exclusively at Walmart Supercenters through July. Beginning on September 26, 2013, select Taco Bell locations began offering "Mountain Dew Typhoon Freeze", which was a slushie version of the Mountain Dew Typhoon flavor available during 2010 and 2011. It was discontinued at the beginning of June 2014 and was replaced with the Dr. Pepper Vanilla Float Freeze. The flavor's rerelease was announced on May 24, 2022, with a release date of June 1. The release was exclusive to the Dew Store website, remaining available until early August 2022.	
Mountain Dew Game Fuel Tropical	2011	A tropical variant released to coincide with the release of Call of Duty: Modern Warfare 3. Like its counterpart, its concept was leaked in early August 2011 using an eBay auction, was announced on Mountain Dew's Facebook page on 24 August 2011, and was released to U.S. stores on 10 October that year. It stayed on the shelves until the end of 2011. It was originally tested by 500 Dew Labs members as a "mystery" flavor.	
Mountain Dew Dark Berry	2012	A limited-edition mixed berry variant with a release coinciding with the film The Dark Knight Rises. It first gained popularity when a photo of the drink leaked on Instagram. On March 14, Dark Berry was officially announced by the Mountain Dew Facebook page. Its eight-week release period began on June 18.	
Mountain Dew Johnson City Gold	2012–2013	A malt variant with lemon-lime named after Johnson City, Tennessee, that was test-marketed in August 2012 in the Chicago area, Denver, Colorado, and Charlotte, North Carolina. Mountain Dew promised a return after 2013 after "Dew Fans" voted for names with six different kinds of cans for certain regions of the United States, named Liberty Malt, Southern Gold, Rusted Malt, Gold Mountain Malt, Great Plains Gold and Miner's Malt.	
Mountain Dew Cold Fusion	2013–2016	A cherry/lime Slurpee that was released in U.S. convenience stores, including Sheetz. It was discontinued in 2016 and is no longer listed as a flavor on their official website.	
Mountain Dew Game Fuel Electrifying Berry	2013–2014	A berry variant was released to coincide with the release of the video game Ryse: Son of Rome for the Xbox One.	
Mountain Dew Sangrita Blast	2013–2017 (fountain); 2015 (retail)	A cherry/pomegranate variant introduced in 2013 and available exclusively as a fountain drink at Taco Bell restaurants. In April 2015, Baja Blast and Sangrita Blast appeared on retail shelves for a limited time run. At the beginning of May 2015, select Taco Bell locations began offering a freeze version of the drink, which was discontinued at the beginning of September 2015. Mountain Dew Sangrita Blast itself was discontinued in early 2017 and replaced with Mountain Dew Spiked Lemonade.	
Mountain Dew Game Fuel Lemonade	2014–2015	A lemonade variant introduced on October 6, 2014, to promote Call of Duty: Advanced Warfare.	
Mountain Dew Dewitos	2014	A Doritos-flavored Mountain Dew taste-tested on U.S. college campuses.	
Mountain Dew Dewshine	2015–2017	A clear, citrus variant made with real sugar and available in glass bottles. Dewshine was non-alcoholic, despite the name being a portmanteau of Mountain Dew and moonshine.	
Mountain Dew Game Fuel Berry Lime	2015	A berry/lime variant that debuted in October 2015 to promote Call of Duty: Black Ops III.	
Mountain Dew Game Fuel Mango Heat	2016	A mango variant with a ginger finish.	
Mountain Dew Spiked Lemonade	2017–2018	A lemonade variant "spiked with thirst-quenching prickly pear cactus juice" and created with "no artificial sweeteners" and "real fruit juice". In June 2017, Sangrita Blast was replaced in Taco Bell restaurants with Mountain Dew Spiked Lemonade. Taco Bell also offered a Mountain Dew Spiked Lemonade freeze drink until early 2018, when both Spiked variants were discontinued.	
Mountain Dew Spiked Raspberry Lemonade	2017–2018	A raspberry lemonade Dew "spiked with thirst-quenching prickly pear cactus juice". In early 2018, both Spiked variants were discontinued due to low sales.	
Mountain Dew DEW-S-A	2017, 2021	A combination of Code Red, White Out, and Voltage released as a limited edition from May through August 2017. It was advertised as a partnership with Dale Earnhardt Jr. The drink was re-released in the summer of 2021.	
Mountain Dew Game Fuel Arctic Burst	2017–2018	A Slurpee flavor available exclusively at 7-Eleven stores as part of a promotion for Superman Returns. It was re-released in October 2017 to promote the release of Middle-earth: Shadow of War. Its companion flavor was Game Fuel (Tropical Smash).	
Mountain Dew Game Fuel Tropical Smash	2017–2018	A tropical variant released alongside Arctic Burst as a Game Fuel flavor, promoting the video game Forza Motorsport 7.	
Mountain Dew Holiday Brew	2017–2018	A variant composed of original Mountain Dew and Code Red released in late 2017 alongside Pepsi Salted Caramel, Holiday Brew refers to the traditional Christmas colors of green and red.	
Mountain Dew Black Label	2015–2020	A crafted dark berry variant released in 16 oz. cans in 2015. Described as "Deeper, Darker Dew".	
Mountain Dew White Label	2017–2019	A pineapple/grapefruit variant described as "Mysteriously Exotic Dew", sold in 16 oz. cans similar to that of Black Label and Green Label.	
Mountain Dew Green Label	2017–2019	A kiwi-apple variant described as "Curiously Daring Dew".	
Mountain Dew ICE	2018–2020	A low-calorie clear lemon-lime flavored Mountain Dew released in 2018. It was comparable to lemon-lime soda such as Sprite and Sierra Mist, and was promoted heavily on release with a Super Bowl ad dedicated to it and Doritos Blaze. However, it sold poorly and was discontinued in the United States by early 2020.	
Mountain Dew ICE Cherry	2018–2020	A cherry variant of Mountain Dew ICE that was released in late 2018 as a limited-time flavor. It was cherry mixed with the lemon-lime flavor of ICE. In mid-2019, it was re-released as a permanent flavor in certain regions but was quickly discontinued at the same time ICE was discontinued in early 2020.	
Mountain Dew Merry Mash-Up	2018, 2019, 2020	A holiday-themed cranberry/pomegranate flavor.	
Mountain Dew Liberty Chill	2019, 2020, 2024 (limited time offer)	A fruit-flavored variant, known as Liberty Brew in 2019 and 2020. Described as "50 flavors in one".	
Mountain Dew Baja Punch	2021	A tropical punch dew flavor released in June 2021 to coincide with the Summer of Baja promotion.	
Mountain Dew Baja Flash	2021	A pina colada dew flavor released in June 2021 to coincide with the Summer of Baja promotion.	
Mountain Dew Cake-Smash	2021	A birthday cake-flavored Mountain Dew released exclusively on the Mountain Dew online store. Advertised as giving fans the chance to "do over" their missed parties and celebrations from the COVID-19 pandemic.	
Mountain Dew Flamin' Hot	2021, 2022	A spicy citrus flavor of Mountain Dew, advertised as "the first-ever beverage combining the sweet, citrus flavor of Dew with the spicy, kicked up flavor of Flamin' Hot for the most extreme taste experience yet." First released as a limited edition exclusively on the Mountain Dew online store, the drink sold out in less than an hour. Released to retail for a limited time in 2022; flavor has been changed from its original release, and is "slightly different with a lime flavor kick".	
Mountain Dew Gingerbread Snap'd	2021	A gingerbread cookie-flavored Dew released for the 2021 holiday season.	
Mountain Dew Baja Gold	2022 (limited time release)	Flavor in the Baja Blast line, described as "a bright island pineapple flavor"	
Mountain Dew Baja Mango Gem	2022 (limited time release)	Flavor in the Baja Blast line, described as "a colorful orange tropical mango flavor"	
Mountain Dew Baja Deep Dive	2022 (giveaway prize)	Mystery flavor in the Baja Blast line described as "taking the classic Baja flavor to new depths." Exclusively available as a prize in the "Treasures of Baja Island" promotion.	
Mountain Dew Fruit Quake	2022	A fruitcake flavor released for the 2022 holiday season. It was the 4th holiday flavor.	
Mountain Dew Baja Caribbean Splash	2023 (limited time release)	Flavor in the Baja Blast line, described as "Dew with a blast of natural and artificial guava flavor"	
Mountain Dew Baja Passionfruit Punch	2023 (limited time release)	Flavor in the Baja Blast line, described as "Dew with a blast of natural and artificial passionfruit flavor"	
Mountain Dew HoneyDEW	2023 (limited time release)	Honeydew melon flavor sold in Canada for a limited time in 2023.	
Mountain Dew Game Fuel Mystic Punch	2023 (limited time release)	A fruit punch flavor with Diablo IV branding.	
Mountain Dew Baja Laguna Lemonade	2024 (limited time offer)	Mango lemonade flavored Dew. Part of the Baja line of flavors.	
Mountain Dew Baja Point Break Punch	2024 (limited time offer)	Tropical punch flavored Dew. Part of the Baja line of flavors.	
Mountain Dew Star Spangled Splash	2024 (limited time offer)	Berry flavored Dew.	
Mountain Dew Freedom Fusion	2024 (limited time offer)	A peach lemonade flavored Dew.	
Mountain Dew Game Fuel Citrus Blackberry	2024 (limited time release)	A Blackberry–Raspberry flavored Dew with World of Warcraft: The War Within branding.	
Mountain Dew Spark	2020, 2021 (limited time release, exclusive to Speedway) 2022–2025	A raspberry lemonade flavor originally offered exclusively at Speedway gas stations for a limited time during August 2020 and has since been released widely. This flavor was discontinued in 2025. Was also available in zero sugar.	
Mountain Dew Major Melon	2021–2025	A watermelon flavored variant that was also available in zero sugar. It was discontinued alongside Spark.	

== See also ==
- List of citrus soft drinks
- Surge
