= Sweet Lightning =

Flavor of Mountain Dew

Sweet Lightning logo

Mountain Dew Sweet Lightning is a flavor of Mountain Dew exclusive to KFC that was introduced in 2019. The peach and honey-flavored soda has an orange-yellow color. It is noted for its sweetness. It was designed to be paired with KFC's menu items, similar to Baja Blast, a Mountain Dew variant that was designed to pair with Taco Bell menu items.

A variation called Sweet Lightning Peaches and Cream was introduced in 2025. The drink was inspired by dirty soda, a drink containing soda, cream and other flavorings.

KFC announced in October 2026 they would be switching soft drink providers from PepsiCo, owners of Mountain Dew, to Coca-Cola. Mountain Dew Sweet Lightning will be phased out from KFC locations in December 2026.

== Reception ==
Mike Pomranz of Food & Wine, gave the drink a favorable review, noting that its taste paired well with fried chicken. Jim Vorel, writing for Paste, compared the drink's yellow color to urine.

Nicolette Baker of Food & Wine compared the flavor of Sweet Lightning Peaches and Cream to a creamsicle.
