= Mountain Dew Voltage =

Variant of Mountain Dew

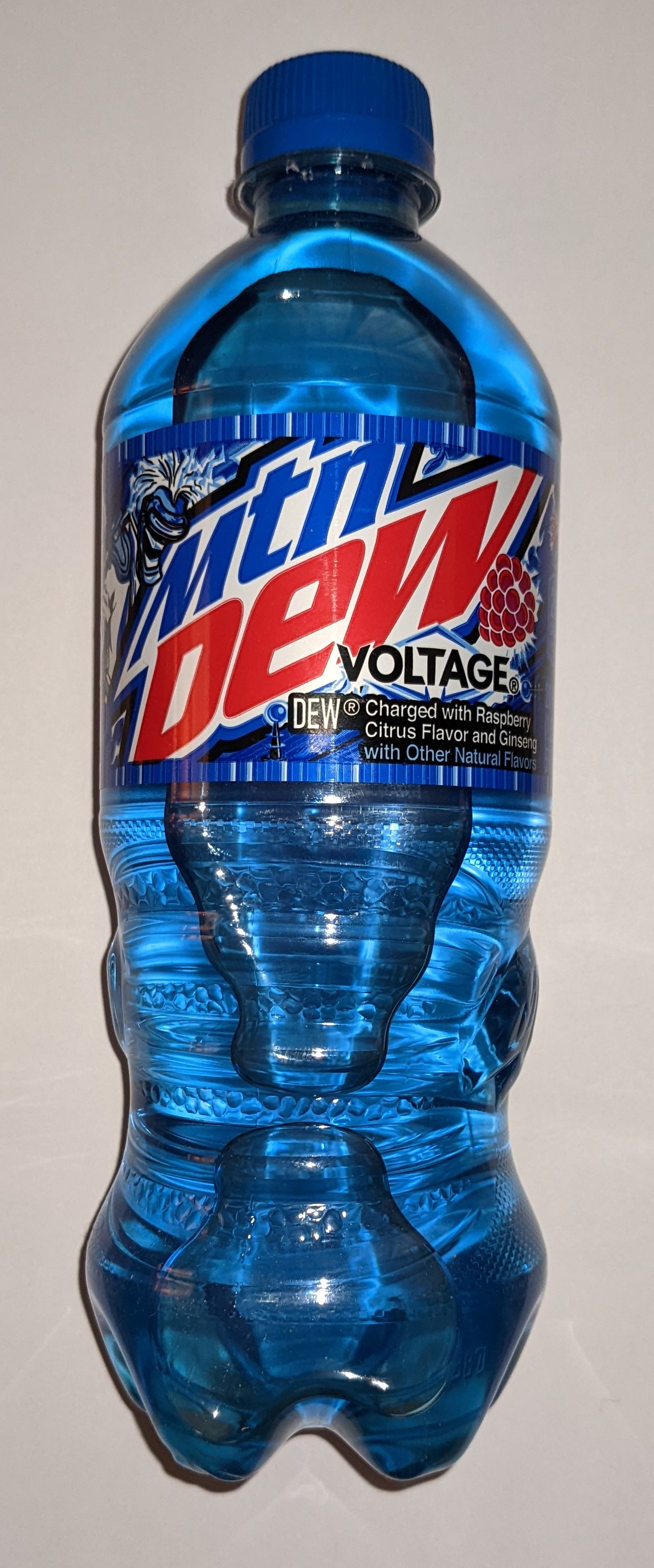
- Type: Blue raspberry/citrus soft drink
- Manufacturer: PepsiCo
- Origin: United States
- Introduced: 2008; 18 years ago
- Color: Blue
- Variants: Diet Mountain Dew Voltage
- Related products: Mountain Dew

Mountain Dew Voltage is a variant of the carbonated soft drink Mountain Dew. It is a blue raspberry/citrus flavor with ginseng and was introduced in 2008.

== History ==
In November 2007, Mountain Dew launched a campaign called "DEWmocracy" in which the public would elect on new flavors to become part of the brand line. DEWmocracy participation and voting was conducted via an online game. Voltage was one of three finalists, along with the flavors Revolution and Supernova. As part of the first DEWmocracy promotion, all three were released in stores in the summer of 2008 as limited edition flavors, while consumers voted on the variant to be added as an extension to the brand. On August 17, 2008, Voltage was announced as the winner with 42% of all votes, and it was released on December 29, 2008 as a permanent flavor.

Diet Voltage was released in 2011 as a part of the "FanDEWmonium" promotion and made it to the finals with Diet Mountain Dew Supernova, meaning it had a limited release in U.S. stores while voting took place, until Diet Supernova was revealed to be the winner. It came in second against Diet Mountain Dew Supernova, with 45% out of all votes.

The Mountain Dew flavor DEW-S-A, released for a limited time in 2017 and 2021, contained Voltage as part of its flavor, along with Code Red and White Out.
