= Mountain Dew LiveWire =

Variant of Mountain Dew

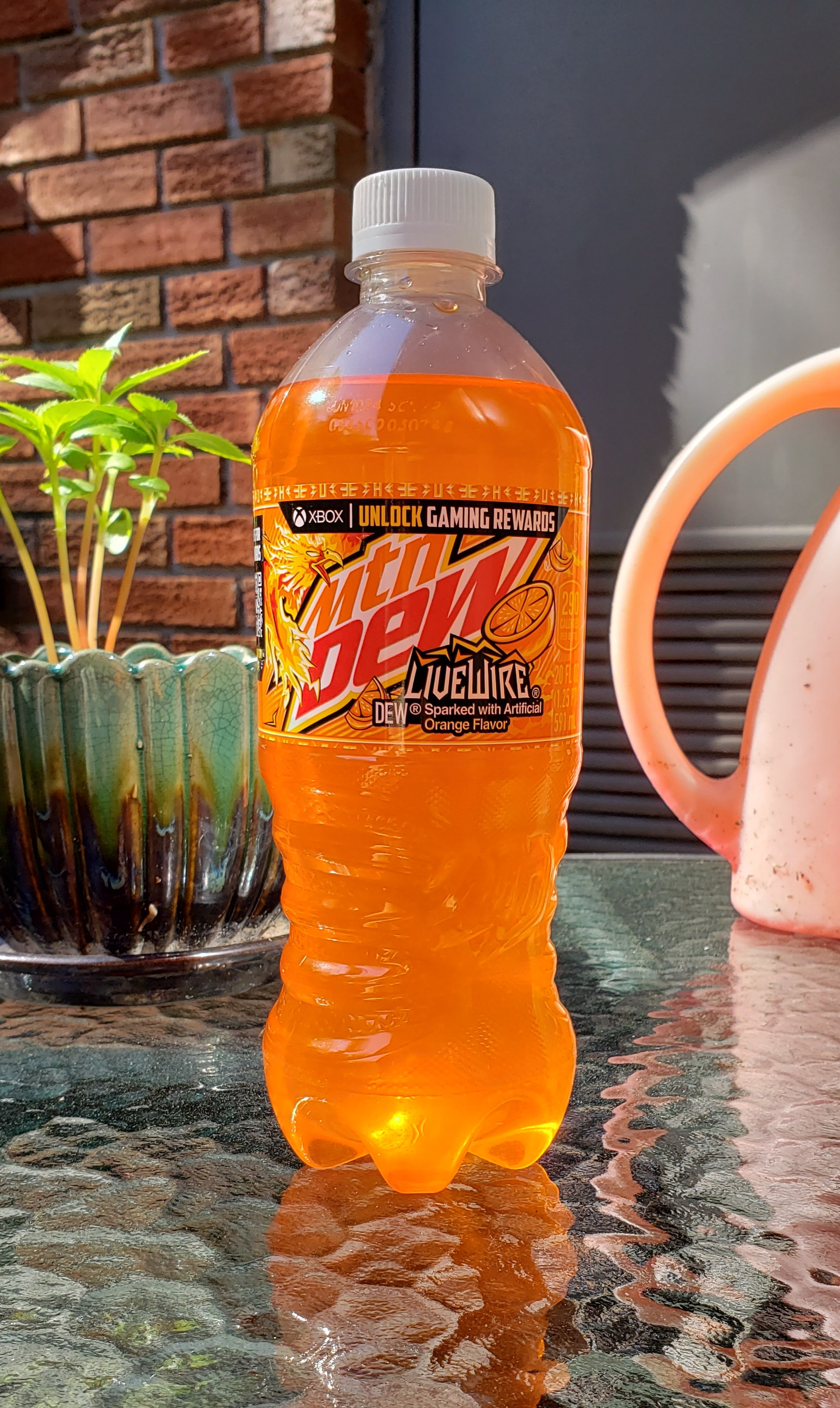
- Type: Orange soft drink
- Manufacturer: PepsiCo
- Origin: United States
- Introduced: 2003; 23 years ago
- Color: Orange
- Related products: Mountain Dew

Mountain Dew LiveWire is an orange-flavored variant of the carbonated soft drink Mountain Dew. It was introduced in 2003.

== History ==
Mountain Dew LiveWire was first introduced as a limited-edition flavor for the summer of 2003. Broadly targeted to teenagers and young adults, it was available in the United States from Memorial Day to Labor Day. According to PepsiCo, LiveWire boosted overall sales of Mountain Dew by 10 percent in 2003. It additionally increased sales of orange soft drinks as a whole. However, PepsiCo did not consider LiveWire in that category, with the executive stating: "With all due respect to your data, Mountain Dew LiveWire is not an orange soda. It's an inimitable new Dew, combining the unique formula of base Mountain Dew with a bold orange flavor." That same year, LiveWire was also available as a Slurpee flavor. LiveWire returned to stores in the summer of 2004, with the marketing product description being changed from "Orange Ignited" to "Dew sparked with orange". In 2005, Mountain Dew Livewire became a permanent addition to the product line due to the success of its sales in the previous two years. It is the second flavor extension of the brand, following Mountain Dew Code Red in 2001.

== Countries ==
Mountain Dew LiveWire has been available in the United States, Malaysia, and New Zealand.

== Hard Mountain Dew ==
In 2021, PepsiCo and Boston Beer teamed to create a range of alcoholic Mountain Dews. Since then, Livewire has been one of the various flavors released. These flavored-malt beverages have an ABV of 5%, no added sugar, and contain 100 calories per 12 US fl oz (355 mL) serving.

The Livewire flavor launch party, named "definitely over 21", was held at a retirement community in the Orange State.
