= Baja Blast =

Lime-flavored soft drink

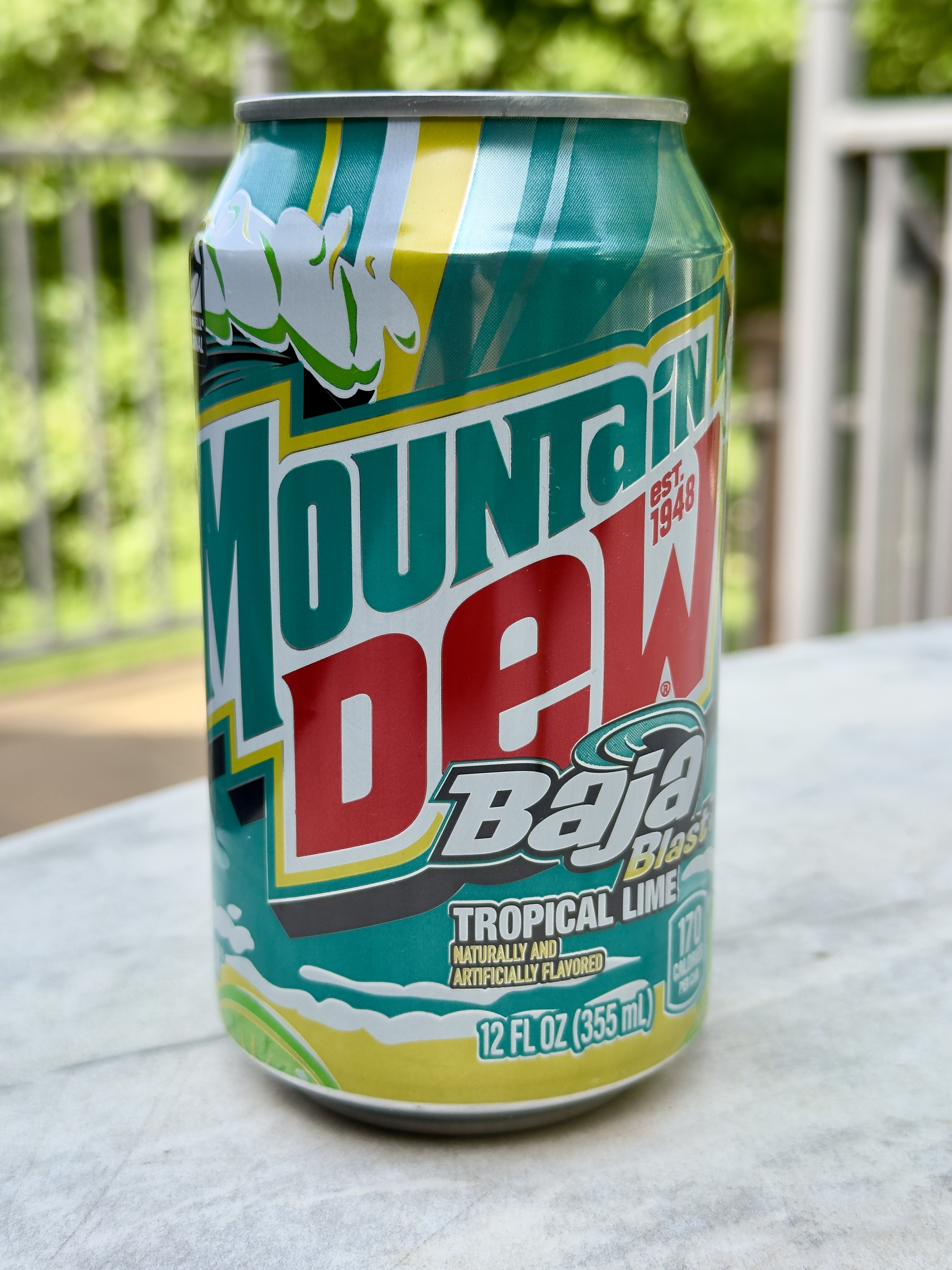
- Type: Citrus soft drink
- Manufacturer: PepsiCo
- Origin: United States
- Introduced: July 29, 2004; 22 years ago
- Color: Teal
- Related products: Mountain Dew

Mountain Dew Baja Blast is a tropical lime-flavored soft drink created for fast-food chain Taco Bell. Since its original launch in 2004, the Baja Blast brand has expanded with wider retail availability, as well as new flavors, alcoholic beverages, energy drinks, merchandise, and dessert products such as gelato and pie. The drink's name is derived from the Mexican state of Baja California.

== History ==
The soda was first made available on July 29, 2004. Created for Taco Bell restaurants and exclusively sold there, it was a collaboration between the chain and Mountain Dew owners PepsiCo. One of the first instances of a restaurant offering an exclusive soda beverage, it was created to increase sales of fountain soda. The flavor was heavily promoted at launch with advertising campaigns. In 2008, an engineering project called Operation Soda Steal sought to take the flavor in bulk.

In 2014, ten years after the drink's original launch, it was released for the first time in a packaged format for retail sale. The retail release was only available for a limited time. The drink was promoted on Twitter, as well as through on-air advertisements featuring Dale Earnhardt Jr.

In December 2013/January 2014, Taco Bell released Mountain Dew Sangrita Blast, a non-alcoholic sangria flavor, as a sister flavor to Baja Blast, along with a diet version of Baja Blast.

In 2015, Baja Blast was re-released for a limited time at retail stores, along with Sangrita Blast.

In 2016, the flavor was part of the "DEWcision" campaign. It was put up against Mountain Dew flavor Pitch Black, and fans would vote for their favorite, the winner of which would be kept on store shelves permanently. The campaign featured wide promotion of both flavors, including advertisements, NASCAR paint schemes and a "Dewggro Crag" event themed around the Nickelodeon game show Guts. It was ultimately announced that Pitch Black had won the vote, and would remain on store shelves. As such, Baja Blast was once again discontinued from retailers.

Following the discontinuation of Pitch Black due to poor sales, the flavor returned to store shelves yearly since 2018. A zero sugar version was offered starting in 2019.

In 2019, Taco Bell began offering a birthday-themed Baja Blast freeze to celebrate the drink's 15th birthday. Select locations, branded "Taco Bell Cantina", offered the alcoholic "Mountain Dew Baja Blast Twisted Freeze". The "Baja Blast Colada" freeze was offered by Taco Bell in 2021.

In 2022, Baja Blast was announced as one of the flavors of the Hard Mountain Dew line of alcoholic beverages, which would release in retail stores later that year. The flavor was added to the Mountain Dew Energy line of energy drinks later that year.

The Baja Blast brand has expanded to include themed merchandise, such as flavored lip balm, room sprays, bath and body care products, Baja Blast flavored gelato and Halloween costumes. A limited-edition Baja Blast hot sauce was created in 2023 as part of a giveaway promotion.

Taco Bell began testing a Baja Blast gelato on their menu in August 2023; during which it was offered for two weeks at a single location in Irvine, California. Taco Bell also offered Mountain Dew Energy Baja Blast in a test market, along with Baja Blast Charged Berry, which features the energy drink mixed with strawberry flavor.

In January 2024, Pepsi announced that in celebration of the 20th anniversary of Baja Blast, it would remain on shelves permanently, instead of its prior summer-only retail availability. Advertised as the "20th Bajaversary", promotions for the anniversary included a Super Bowl LVIII advertisement, new products, and giveaway items.

In 2025, Taco Bell announced that they would make a limited edition Baja Blast Pie that will be available at all locations for $19.99.

In 2026, Pepsi announced they had signed a deal with Major League Baseball to make Baja Blast the official soft drink of the league, replacing Coca-Cola (Pepsi's biggest rival in the soft drink industry, who had previously replaced Pepsi as an MLB sponsor in 2017). In July 2026, Pepsi released Baja Blast in glass bottles. Unlike other form factors, glass-bottle Baja Blast is sweetened with real sugar, as opposed to high-fructose corn syrup.

Baja Blast Zero Sugar expanded to United Kingdom Taco Bell locations in June 2026. Beginning August 2026, Taco Bell locations in the United States and Canada launched You Seem Pretty Pink For A Baja Blast, a mixed beverage using pink lemonade and Baja Blast created in collaboration with Olivia Rodrigo.

== Flavors ==
In 2021, Baja Blast was released at retail as part of the "Summer of Baja" promotion, alongside new "spinoff" flavors. These flavors were Baja Punch, a tropical punch flavor, and Baja Flash, a piña colada flavor.

In June 2022, Baja Blast's retail release was accompanied by new flavors Baja Gold, a pineapple flavor, and Baja Mango Gem, a mango flavor. A third new flavor, Baja Deep Dive, was a mystery flavor available exclusively as a giveaway prize.

Hard Mountain Dew, an alcoholic line of Mountain Dew flavors, offers Baja Blast as one of its flavors. In May 2023, a Baja Blast variety pack was announced, including new flavors Hard Baja Blast Pineapple, Hard Baja Blast Punch and Hard Baja Blast Mango.

Shortly after, in June 2023, Baja Blast was released into retail stores for the ninth time, this time accompanied by new flavors Baja Caribbean Splash, a guava flavor, and Baja Passionfruit Punch, a passionfruit flavor.

In March 2024, Pepsi released two new flavors for a limited time: Baja Laguna Lemonade, a mango lemonade flavor, and Baja Point Break Punch, a tropical punch flavor. In April, Doritos released a limited-time flavor inspired by Baja Blast, Doritos Baja Fiery Mango.

In 2025, Taco Bell revealed that they would release a new flavor of Baja Blast in summer 2025 called Baja Midnight, a passionfruit flavor. An additional flavor, Baja Cabo Citrus, was released in-stores for a limited time in spring 2025, and later returned in 2026 with a reformulation that excludes artificial dyes.

In August 2026, Pepsi launched Baja Leo, a zero-sugar flavor with notes of spiced mango, chili lime, and black pepper, as a limited-time drop on the TikTok Shop.

Non-alcoholic varieties
| Name | Flavor | Dates of production | Notes |
|---|---|---|---|
| Cabo Citrus | Tropical punch | 2025, 2026 | Limited release |
| Caribbean Splash | Guava | 2023 | Limited release |
| Deep Dive | Mystery | 2022 | Giveaway prize |
| Flash | Piña colada | 2021 | Limited release |
| Gold | Pineapple | 2022 | Limited release |
| Laguna Lemonade | Mango, lemonade | 2024 | Limited release |
| Leo | Spiced mango, chili lime, black pepper | 2026 | TikTok Shop |
| Mango Gem | Mango | 2022 | Limited release |
| Midnight | Passion fruit | 2025 | Taco Bell exclusive |
| Passionfruit Punch | Passion fruit | 2023 | Limited release |
| Point Break Punch | Tropical punch | 2024 | Limited release |
| Punch | Tropical punch | 2021 | Limited release |

Alcoholic varieties
| Name | Dates of production |
|---|---|
| Original | 2022–present |
| Pineapple | 2022–present |
| Punch | 2022–present |
| Mango | 2022–present |

== See also ==
- Sweet Lightning, a Mountain Dew variant exclusive to KFC
- List of soft drink brands
