= Mountain Dew Major Melon =

Variant of Mountain Dew

- Type: Soft drink
- Manufacturer: PepsiCo
- Origin: United States
- Introduced: January 4, 2021; 5 years ago
- Discontinued: January 2025; 1 year ago
- Color: Pink
- Related products: Mountain Dew

Mountain Dew Major Melon was a watermelon-flavored variant of the carbonated soft drink Mountain Dew. It had a pink color and was released on January 4, 2021, as a permanent flavor. It was discontinued in January 2025 alongside Mountain Dew Spark.

== History ==
In 2020, information including promotional materials for Mountain Dew Major Melon were leaked on Reddit.

In January 2021, the flavor was released in stores throughout the United States and also made available in zero sugar. Nicole Portwood, vice president of marketing for Mountain Dew, said "Watermelon is a truly transportive taste, evoking feelings of freedom and nostalgia. We found watermelon to be the number one choice of flavors tested amongst our fans, and Mountain Dew Major Melon is our answer for those who are looking for a refreshing charge to keep them invigorated all day long." Major Melon was also the first permanent flavor of Mountain Dew since White Out in 2010.

A month later, Major Melon was promoted with commercial for Super Bowl LV starring John Cena, which offered a reward of $1 million for the first person to correctly count the exact number of Mountain Dew Major Melon bottles in the ad and tweet their answer. The winner was announced on February 17, 2021.
