= Amazon Inspire =

Video-sharing e-commerce platform created by Amazon Inc.

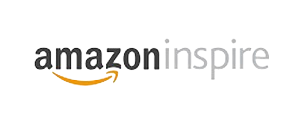
- Website type: Online video platform
- Headquarters: {{{location_country}}}
- Owner: Amazon Inc.
- Industry: E-commerce
- Parent: Amazon Inc.
- Launched: December 2022; 3 years ago
- Current status: Discontinued as of February 2025

Amazon Inspire was an e-commerce short-form video platform founded by Amazon that existed from December 2022 to February 2025. The app is a built in platform inside of the Amazon app which allows users (mainly Internet influencers) to upload videos showcasing or promoting personal or sponsored products.

The app was created to compete with TikTok Shop, a similar shopping platform integrated into the TikTok application. In 2025, Amazon made the decision to discontinue the service.

== History ==
Amazon started testing a beta version of the platform in August 2022. The platform was then officially released in December 2022 to the public. In 2023, Amazon offered select creators $12,500 in compensation for a maximum of 500 videos, or $25 for every qualifying video; TechCrunch reported that this compensation offer was criticized by influencers for being too low.

As of 2025, Inspire is no longer available in the Amazon shopping app. The website shows this message, "Thank you for using Amazon Inspire to discover and shop new products on Amazon. Please note that Inspire is no longer available in the Amazon shopping app. Need more ideas or ready to shop? Rufus is at your service. You can also explore Amazon's homepage, visit AI shopping guides, or search using text or images." Amazon confirmed that the service was discontinued on February 18, 2025.

== Overview ==
Users can access the Inspire feature at a sparkle icon in the navigation bar on the bottom of the app. Once clicked, users are able to browse through videos showcasing various products tailored to their interests. They can interact with these posts by liking them. An algorithm then analyzes the user's interactions and tailors the content further to match their preferences, providing a personalized browsing experience.

Users have the option to upload a video promoting a product, along with a description and relevant tags. Upon upload, the video undergoes a moderation process to ensure compliance with Amazon's terms of service and appropriateness standards. This process helps maintain the integrity of the platform and ensures that only suitable content is shared with the community.
