= Mountain Dew Voo-Dew =

Variant of Mountain Dew

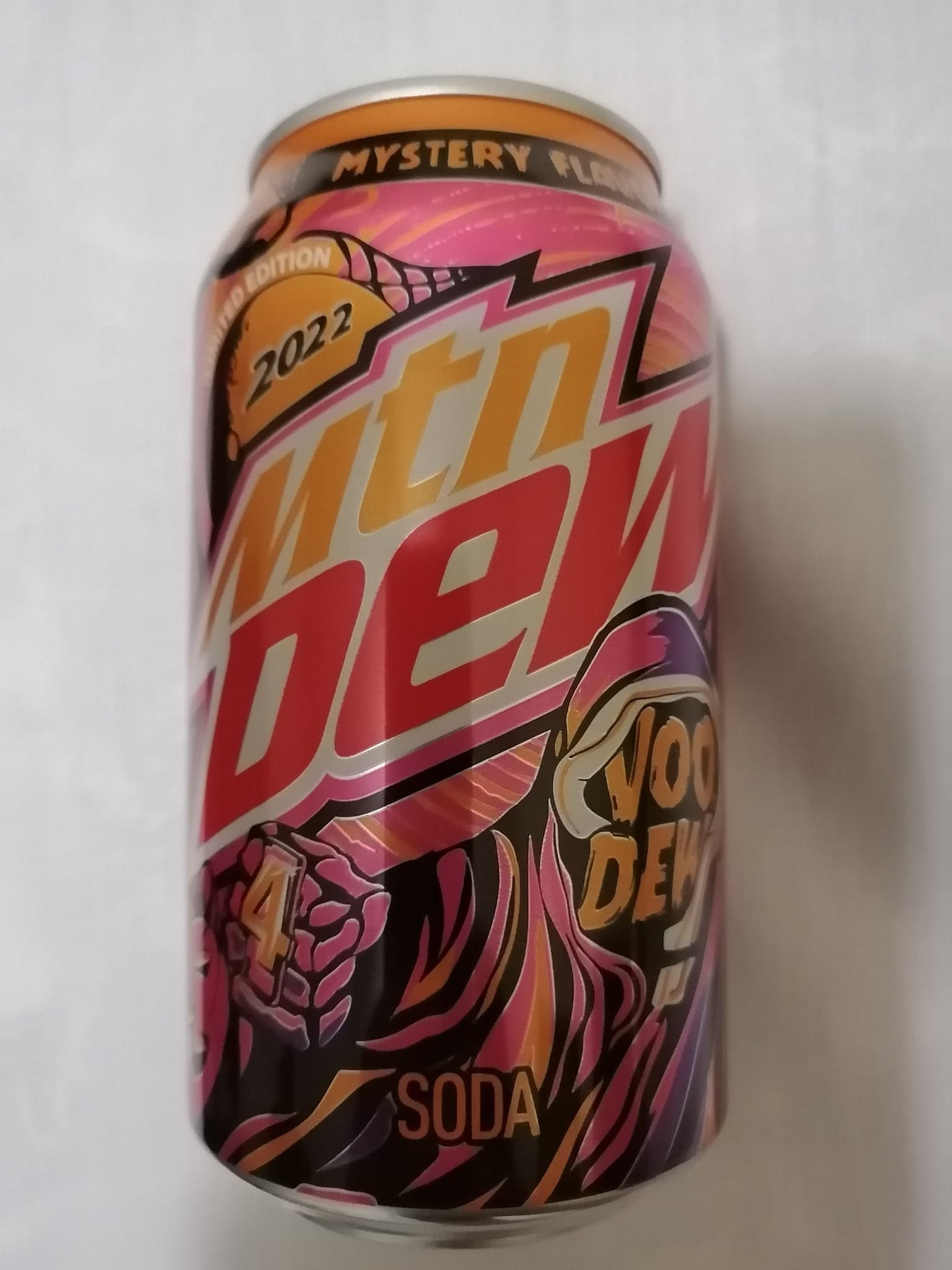
- Can of Mountain Dew Voo-Dew (2022)
- Type: Soft drink
- Manufacturer: PepsiCo
- Origin: United States
- Introduced: 2019; 7 years ago
- Color: White
- Related products: Mountain Dew

Mountain Dew Voo-Dew is a series of Halloween-themed mystery-flavored variants of the carbonated soft drink Mountain Dew, released annually from 2019 to 2024. Every variant has a cloudy white color and similar artwork depicting the mascot of the line. The company unveiled the new flavor at the end of every October.

== History ==
Mountain Dew Voo-Dew was announced in the summer of 2019. The first flavor of the line was released in stores on August 26, 2019, and revealed to be candy corn at the end of its scheduled release.

The second flavor was launched in September 2020 and revealed to be "fruit candy explosion".

The third flavor began selling in stores on August 30, 2021 and revealed to be "fruit candy chews".

The fourth flavor was launched in late August 2022 and revealed to be "sour candy". Beginning in 2022, Mountain Dew Voo-Dew has additionally been made available in zero sugar. Voo-Dew flavors from 2019 to 2021 were rereleased in 2022 in an online-only variety pack titled Ghosts of Voo-Dew Past.

The fifth flavor was released in September 2023 and revealed to be flavored after cherry Airheads candy, as part of a partnership with the candy brand.

The sixth flavor was released in stores in September 2024 and revealed to be "pink fruit candy".
