= Punica (drink) =

German carbonated soft drink

- Type: Soft Drink
- Manufacturer: PepsiCo
- Country of origin: Germany
- Introduced: 1977
- Flavor: Tropical fruit, pink banana, fruity red, melon tropic, sweet cherry
- Website: www.punica.de

Punica is a German carbonated soft drink produced by PepsiCo. that was created by Dittmeyer GmbH and sold from 1977 to 2022.

It is set to return to the stores in April 2024.

== Information ==
Rolf Dittmeyer founded the company, "Dittmeyers Naturrein" in 1960 and imported orange juice from Morocco and South Africa. He then created a brand named, "Valensina". The brand was not a major success and later re-debuted in 1967 as "Valensina-Saft", which had a mix of orange juice concentrate, frozen orange juice and other ingredients. In 1976, Dittmeyer added orange nectar to the mix and named it Punica. Punica then started being sold in 1977 The brand was said to be very popular in the 1980s and 1990s, especially in the Netherlands and Belgium, due to commercials that were targeted at children. The brand was purchased by Procter & Gamble in 1984. The company had popular advertising slogans in the 1980s including "Punica-Oase" (Punich Oasis) and "Fruchtigen Durstlöscher" (fruity thirst quencher).

In 2003, the brand generated sales of over €100,000,000. In 2004, the brand was purchased by JW Childs and was sold to PepsiCo in 2005. Pepsi tried to re-design the brand in 2019 and attempted to do more advertising on Facebook and Instagram in order to reach younger audiences. The re-design was unsuccessful and Pepsi sold their juice brands to PAI Partners in August 2021. The company then discontinued Punica in September 2022 Remaining unsold products were sold at various supermarkets into 2023.

== Other products ==
The brand also produced other beverage lines including Punica Abenteuer Drink, Punica Fruchtig & Spritzig, Punica Tea&Fruit and Punica Saft-Limo.

== In popular culture ==
In 2016, Punica collaborated with the Shrek franchise and the Madagascar franchise. In 2017, Punica collaborated with Smurfs: The Lost Village, featuring Smurfs characters on their products. In 2018, Punica collaborated with the film, Early Man.
