= Tasali Snack Foods =

Saudi potato chips brand

Tasali تسالي
- Product type: Potato chips
- Current owner: PepsiCo
- Country: Saudi Arabia
- Introduced: 1989; 37 years ago
- Previous owners: Savola Group (1989–2001)
- Website: Brand Profile

Tasali Snack Foods is the second largest snack food company in Saudi Arabia. It was launched by Savola Group in 1989 as Saudi Arabia's first local chips brand at a time when the Saudi snack market was dominated by imports. In 2001, it was acquired by PepsiCo. Tasali potato chips are manufactured in PepsiCo's Riyadh plant alongside other PepsiCo snack brands such as Lay's and Cheetos.

== Flavors ==
These are Tasali flavors: (Note: After the acquisition)

- Ketchup
- Chili
- Chili-Ketchup
- Cumin & Lemon
- Flamin' Hot Black Lemon

=== Former ===
- Chili Cheese
- BBQ
- Cheddar Cheese
- Yogurt and Herbs
- Popcorn Butter
- Popcorn Cheddar Cheese
