= Pepsi Blue =

Soft drink from PepsiCo

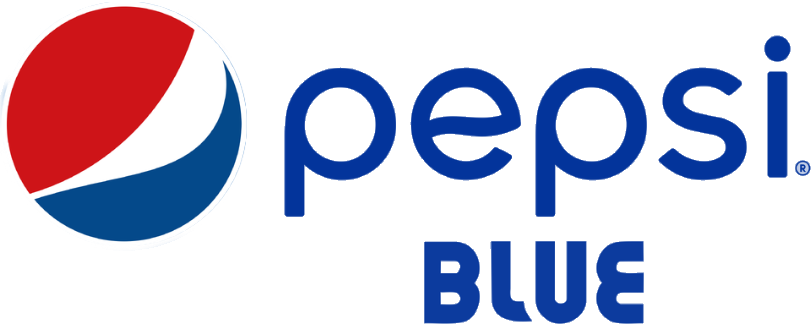

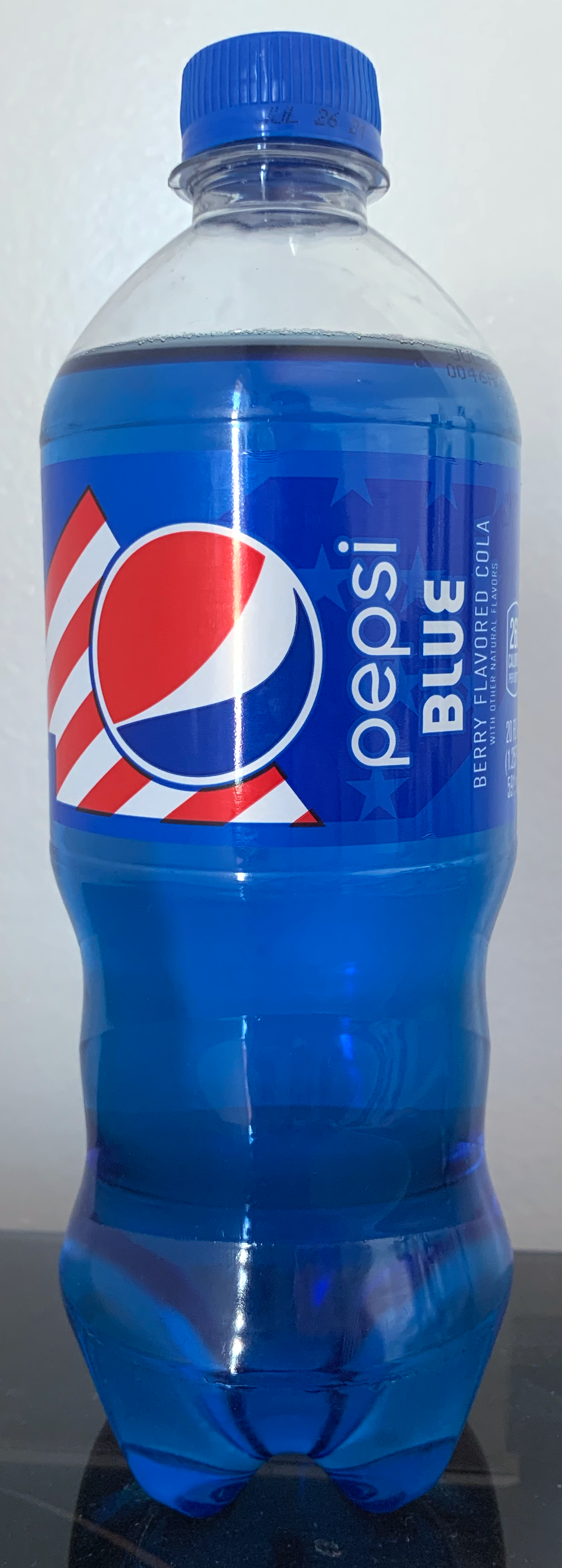
- Bottle of the relaunched Pepsi Blue
- Type: Soft drink
- Manufacturer: PepsiCo
- Origin: United States
- Introduced: August 2002; May 2021 (North American re-release)
- Discontinued: May 2004 (first run) (North American markets); July 2021; 5 years ago (North American re-release)
- Related products: Crystal Pepsi

Pepsi Blue is a berry-flavored soft drink produced by PepsiCo. It was marketed as a "Berry Cola Fusion", and was initially sold from 2002 to 2004 in the United States and Canada (with a limited return in 2021) and was also sold in several Asian markets.

== History ==
The decision to make a brightly colored version of the flagship Pepsi brand was spurred by 2001's introduction of Mountain Dew Code Red, which had bumped PepsiCo's Mountain Dew division sales up 6%, and another source noted that "Pepsi Blue attempted to imitate the lurid hues of Gatorade". It was designed to attract teenage consumers with its bright blue color and unique flavor. It is tinted using Blue 1.

The flavor was described by Pepsi only as "berry" and described by customers as similar to blueberries or raspberries, or similar to cotton candy with a berry-like aftertaste and much more sugary and syrupy than regular cola.

Pepsi Blue was announced in May 2002. It was launched in mid-2002 and discontinued in Canada and the United States in 2004, although it remained available in the Philippines. Pepsi taste-tested more than 100 flavors across 9 months.

In April 2021, Pepsi announced that Pepsi Blue would be reintroduced for a limited time in May 2021.

=== Promotion ===
It was heavily promoted by PepsiCo, including advertisements by pop singer Britney Spears and the bands Sev and Papa Roach, and in the movies The Italian Job and Garfield: The Movie. It was widely seen as a commercial flop as sales remained low. Even with the failure of Pepsi Blue, PepsiCo posted double-digit growth.

Pepsi Blue was promoted after New York Mets games during mid-2002, where the color blue was one of the symbolic colors of the team. Other promotions included handing out free bottles from a Pepsi Blue-themed VW New Beetle at popular shopping centers around the country. Pepsi Blue was also endorsed by Adam Vinatieri, the then New England Patriots kicker, who helped the Patriots win the Super Bowl in 2002.

In Manila, Philippines, Pepsi Blue was sold for a limited time in late 2002 to commemorate the championship of the Ateneo Blue Eagles in the UAAP. In 2011, Pepsi released Pepsi Blue in Metro Manila, Philippines as "Pepsi Pinas". Pepsi Pinas proved successful and was made a permanent product, reverting the name Pepsi Blue, it was soon later be discontinued in no given date. Then later 2022 it makes a comeback, it is rare in bottles and cans but common at 7-Eleven fountains but around 2024, it was silently discontinued.

In India, Pepsi Blue was launched during the 2003 Cricket World Cup supporting the India national cricket team, which has blue jerseys.

== See also ==
- List of Pepsi types
