= Gamesa =

Mexican cookie company

Gamesa, S. de R.L. de C.V.
- Company type: Subsidiary of PepsiCo
- Founded: 1921; 105 years ago
- Headquarters: San Nicolás de los Garza, Nuevo León, Mexico
- Products: Cookies; Pasta
- Website: https://www.gamesacookies.com/

Gamesa (formerly Galletera Mexicana S.A. de C.V. "Mexican Biscuit Company")(also Grupo Gamesa) is Mexico's largest manufacturer of cookies. The company also makes flour, ready to eat cereals and other related products. It is headquartered in San Nicolás de los Garza, Nuevo León, Mexico, and have production facilities in eight states across Mexico and one in Colombia. In 1990, they were acquired by PepsiCo, also owner of Pepsi, Sabritas and Sonric's in Mexico.

Gamesa also sells cookies in the United States, Central and South America and the Caribbean.

Among their most successful brands are "Marias Gamesa", "Emperador", "Arcoiris", "Mamut", "Chokis", "Cremax", "Marca Gamesa", "Saladitas", "Crackets", among others.

== History ==
Alberto, Ignacio, and Manuel Santos Gonzalez, three brothers, acquired the majority of the stocks of the pasta and cookie company "Lara" in 1921, which would change name and merge with other companies to create "Gamesa".

In 1992, the cookie company introduced nine value-priced cookies to the United States market. The move to the U.S. market would hopefully net the company $10 million in sales by the end of 1992 and $20 million by 1993. The advertisement for this campaign was handled by Market Entry of Dallas, TX. They targeted Hispanic consumers.

In the year 2000, the company began a new era in which automation became the norm. The company acquired machinery from Italian company Sasib, that allowed them to produce as much as 3.3 kilos (about 7.3 pounds) per hour.

As of 2023, the company had 13,000 employees.

== Products ==
- Emperador
- Chokis
- Marias
- Arcoiris
- Clasicas
- Mamut
- Saladitas
- Crackets
