= TikTok Shop =

E-commerce feature on TikTok

- Website type: Online video platform; E-commerce
- Headquarters: Culver City, California
- Owner: TikTok
- Industry: E-commerce
- Parent: ByteDance
- Website: www.tiktok.com/shop
- Launched: September 2023; 3 years ago

TikTok Shop is an e-commerce feature of the video hosting service TikTok. Officially launched in September 2023, the feature enables users interested in starting a business and generating income to upload their curated products on TikTok for others to discover and purchase. Daily sales averaged approximately US$7 million in October 2023.As of October 2026, TikTok estimates that 54 million U.S users have purchased something from the platform.

== History ==
In October 2019, TikTok announced its partnership with Shopify for a feature called TikTok: For Business.

In November 2022, ByteDance commenced beta testing of the platform in the United Kingdom and several Southeast Asian countries. In December 2022, Amazon announced the release of Amazon Inspire, a platform resembling TikTok Shop, in a bid to compete with TikTok itself.

In September 2023, ByteDance announced the launch of TikTok Shop globally, which was notably influenced by the launch of Amazon Inspire.

In October 2023, TikTok Shop ceased operating in Indonesia after the government banned online sales through social media platforms, a measure intended to protect smaller merchants and users’ data. In December 2023, TikTok announced it would buy 75.01% of GoTo’s e-commerce unit Tokopedia for $840 million and merge TikTok Shop’s Indonesian business into it, allowing the service to return in a form compliant with the ban.

== Features and services ==
TikTok Shop is TikTok's in-app e-commerce service that allows users to shift between consuming content and online shopping without leaving the app. It is an example of a subset of e-commerce called "social commerce", an industry that has been expanding rapidly in recent years.

Social commerce combines online shopping with social media platforms with features like the ability to purchase within the app, interactive posts or "shoppable content" that allow users to engage with products through the app's content, and ability for merchants to leverage influencer endorsements. In addition to these features, TikTok Shop includes an in-app storefront where customers can search and browse available products, a resale category for luxury items, initiatives intended to aid small businesses, livestreams through which products can be both promoted and purchased as a way to drive buyer interaction, and an algorithm designed to promote products to users based on their prior engagement.

== Performance analytics ==
TikTok Shop has been a major contributor to the sharp rise in US social commerce growth in recent years despite its late entry into the industry. In 2024, TikTok Shop generated over US$100 million during Black Friday.

Because of TikTok Shop's ability to reach a wide audience and garner high consumer engagement, some companies use the site as a primary channel for testing new products and gaining visibility before they reach traditional retail outlets.

The social commerce industry is projected to exceed US$1 trillion by 2028, with TikTok Shop expected to have a major impact on that trajectory.

== Seller Center ==
TikTok Seller Center is the backend portal used by merchants to manage their operations on TikTok Shop. The Seller Center provides tools for product listing, inventory and order management, marketing campaigns, affiliate programs, and analytics such as impressions, conversions, and sales. The platform is a core component of TikTok's e-commerce infrastructure, enabling businesses to sell directly through TikTok's app ecosystem.

Merchants may also receive free education on understanding platform rules, product regulations, growth strategies, or best-practice resources to maximize sales. TikTok provides content creation tools such as the Shoppable Video Hub and a Live Planner to assist sellers with scheduling live shopping streams.

It also integrates with TikTok's affiliate and creator tools, enabling sellers to run campaigns with influencers and offer in-app discounts, bundles, and promotional vouchers. Through TikTok Shop's Creator Affiliate Program, creators are connected to sellers seeking product promotion to produce shoppable content for commission-based opportunities.

TikTok has described Seller Center as a way to give merchants “tailored, actionable guidance” to attract and convert customers. Sellers are required to verify business information, comply with platform policies, and link bank accounts before going live.

== Criticism and controversies ==
Since its launch, TikTok Shop has encountered issues related to misinformation about products, reviews made by generative artificial intelligence to promote certain products, review bombs, and instances of scamming. TikTok Shop often receives mixed reviews on product quality and gaps in seller vetting.

In 2024, some Chinese sellers publicly criticized the platform for tightening U.S. ownership rules and limiting their visibility on the marketplace. There have also been concerns about low-quality or irrelevant products being algorithmically promoted to users. As shipments frequently go through external merchants rather than one streamlined supplier, delivery times vary.
