= Mug Root Beer =

American carbonated beverage

- Product type: Root beer
- Current owner: PepsiCo (1986–present)
- Produced by: New Century Beverage Co.
- Country: U.S.
- Introduced: 1940; 86 years ago
- Previous owners: Belfast Beverage Co.
- Website: mugrootbeer.com pepsico.com/mugrootbeer

Mug Root Beer, 20 fluid ounces
Nutritional value per 100 g (3.5 oz)
- Energy: 260 kcal (1,100 kJ)
- Carbohydrates: 72 g
- Sugars: 71 g
- Fat: 0 g
- Protein: 0 g
Vitamins and minerals
Minerals	Quantity %DV^{†}
Phosphorus	0% 0 mg
Sodium	5% 105 mg
- Other constituents: Quantity
- Caffeine: 0 mg
- ^{†}Percentages estimated using US recommendations for adults.

Mug Root Beer (sometimes stylized as MUG Root Beer) is an American brand of root beer that was originally produced in 1940 under the name Belfast Root Beer. It is now produced by New Century Beverage Company of San Francisco, California, which was acquired by PepsiCo in 1986.

== History ==
Mug Root Beer was originally sold under the name Belfast Root Beer in 1940 by the Belfast Beverage Company in San Francisco, California. The company had been known for making sparkling water and ginger ale since 1877. Belfast Beverage Company was purchased around 1925 by New Century Beverage Company, which had successfully launched Crush Soda in 1918.

In 1936, New Century Beverage Company was granted permission to franchise Pepsi-Cola products, and about four years later, it launched Belfast Root Beer. An advertisement for Belfast Root Beer appears as early as 1947. According to the San Francisco Examiner, the catchphrase, 'You haven't tasted Root Beer like this in years!' filled 1950s newspaper advertisements. An advertisement for Belfast Old Fashioned Mug Root Beer appears as early as 1952. In the 1950s, the soda took on the title Belfast Old Fashioned Mug Root Beer before its name was eventually shortened to Mug Root Beer.

In the late 1960s, Sugar Free Mug (later known as Diet Mug Root Beer) was introduced. Mug Cream Soda and Diet Mug Cream Soda were later introduced, but they are not as widely available. Mug was purchased by Pepsi in 1986, and replaced On-Tap Draft Style Root Beer as Pepsi's root beer brand. Mug Root Beer is currently manufactured by independent bottlers under the authority of New Century Beverage Company.

Since Mug Root Beer's acquisition by PepsiCo in 1986, the company's logo has displayed a bulldog named "Dog" holding a glass of what appears to be frothy Mug Root Beer. PepsiCo stopped producing its sodas in San Francisco in the early 1990s, including Mug Root Beer.
