= Diet Mountain Dew =

Carbonated soft drink brand

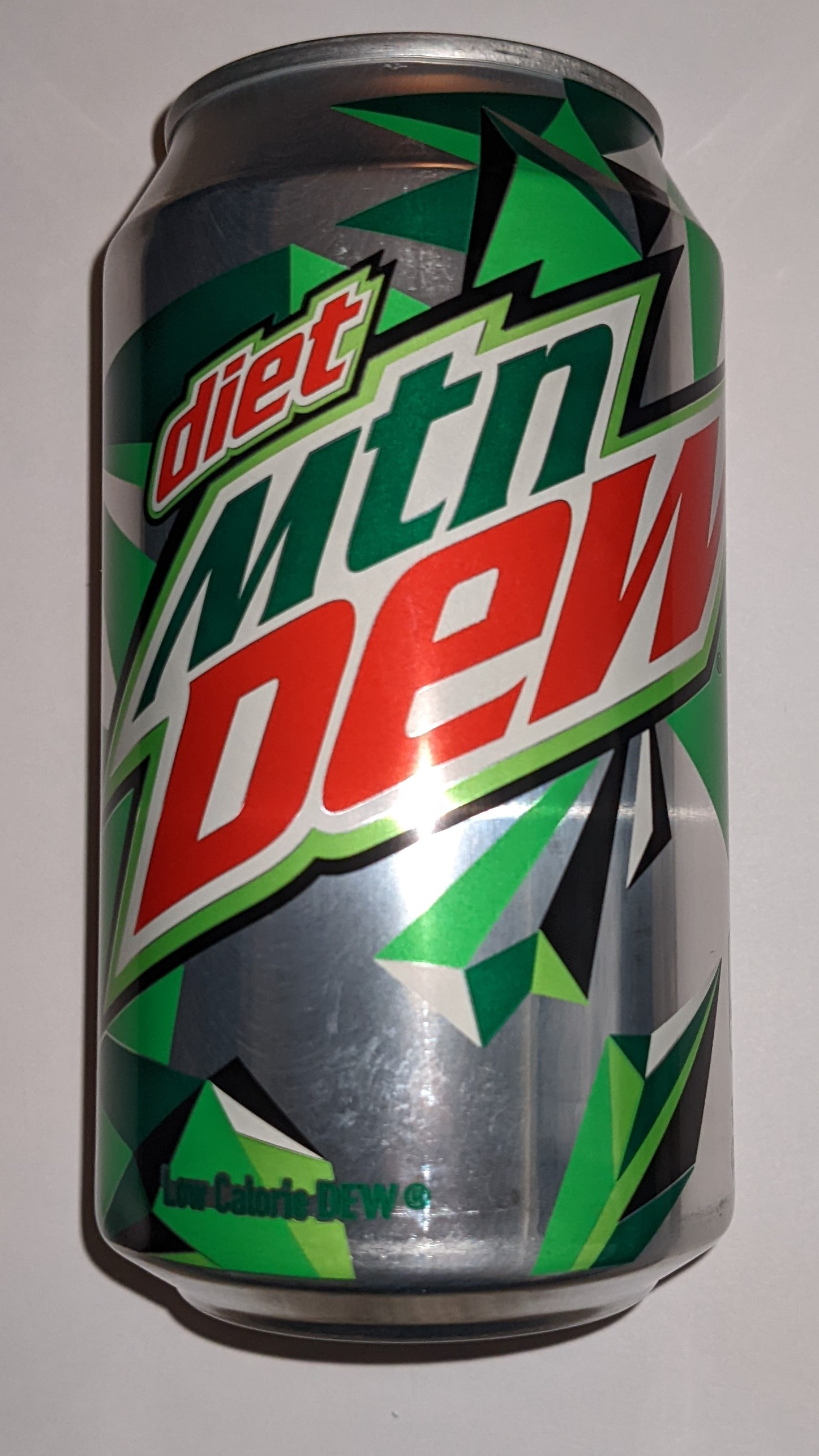
- Type: Citrus soft drink
- Manufacturer: PepsiCo
- Origin: United States
- Introduced: 1975; 51 years ago (as Sugar-Free Mountain Dew); 1986; 40 years ago
- Related products: Mountain Dew
- Website: www.mountaindew.com/products/mtn-dew-diet/

Diet Mountain Dew is a no-calorie Mountain Dew, introduced under its current name in 1986. A caffeine-free variant is also available.

It was introduced in February 1975 as "Sugar-Free Mountain Dew", and was largely only available in the western United States until its March 1986 reformulation with NutraSweet, when it was given its current name.

In 2006, Diet Mountain Dew was reformulated with a new "Tuned Up Taste", using a blend of sucralose, aspartame, and acesulfame potassium as sweeteners. The previous formulation was sweetened exclusively with aspartame.
