= Mountain Dew Code Red =

Cherry-flavored variant of Mountain Dew

- Type: Cherry soft drink
- Manufacturer: PepsiCo
- Origin: United States
- Introduced: 2001; 25 years ago
- Color: Red
- Variants: Regular, Zero Sugar, Diet (discontinued)
- Related products: Mountain Dew

Mountain Dew Code Red is a cherry-flavored carbonated soft drink that was introduced in 2001 as a flavor extension of the original Mountain Dew. This addition marked the first time that the brand had ventured beyond its flagship flavor on a large scale. In 1988 Mountain Dew Red was sold in some areas of Alabama, but later discontinued that same year. These two soft drinks did not share the same formula or taste. Despite the saturated market of soft drink flavors, Code Red saw great success and is considered a major player in the cherry-flavored beverage market.

== History ==
In March 2001, the Mountain Dew website hosted an online racing game. The top-scoring winners received a box containing a "you won" letter, six pack of bottles and a Code Red shirt, before this version was officially released.

PepsiCo considered calling the variant Wild Cherry Mountain Dew, but branded it as Code Red as urban and ethnic focus groups preferred. In May 2001, Mountain Dew Code Red was released to stores in the United States. In its first year of production, Code Red increased overall sales of Mountain Dew by 6%.

Diet Mountain Dew Code Red was introduced in 2002. It was replaced by Zero Sugar Mountain Dew Code Red in 2022, However it is currently available in limited regional markets in the United States.

The Mountain Dew flavor DEW-S-A, released for a limited time in 2017 and 2021, was a combination of red, white and blue Mountain Dew flavors, with Code Red serving as the red flavor in the mix.

An energy drink version of Code Red was released in 2022.

== In popular culture ==
During an overnight work session, researchers named the computer worm Code Red after the Mountain Dew variant they were drinking at the time.

Mountain Dew Code Red was promoted in December 2010 with a television advertisement featuring rapper Jay Electronica performing his song "The Announcement". The campaign proved to be a successful marketing strategy, contributing to the product's widespread popularity amongst consumers.

The Ned Vizzini book, Be More Chill, uses Mountain Dew Code Red as a plot device.
