= Mountain Dew =

Soft drink brand

- Logo used since May 2025

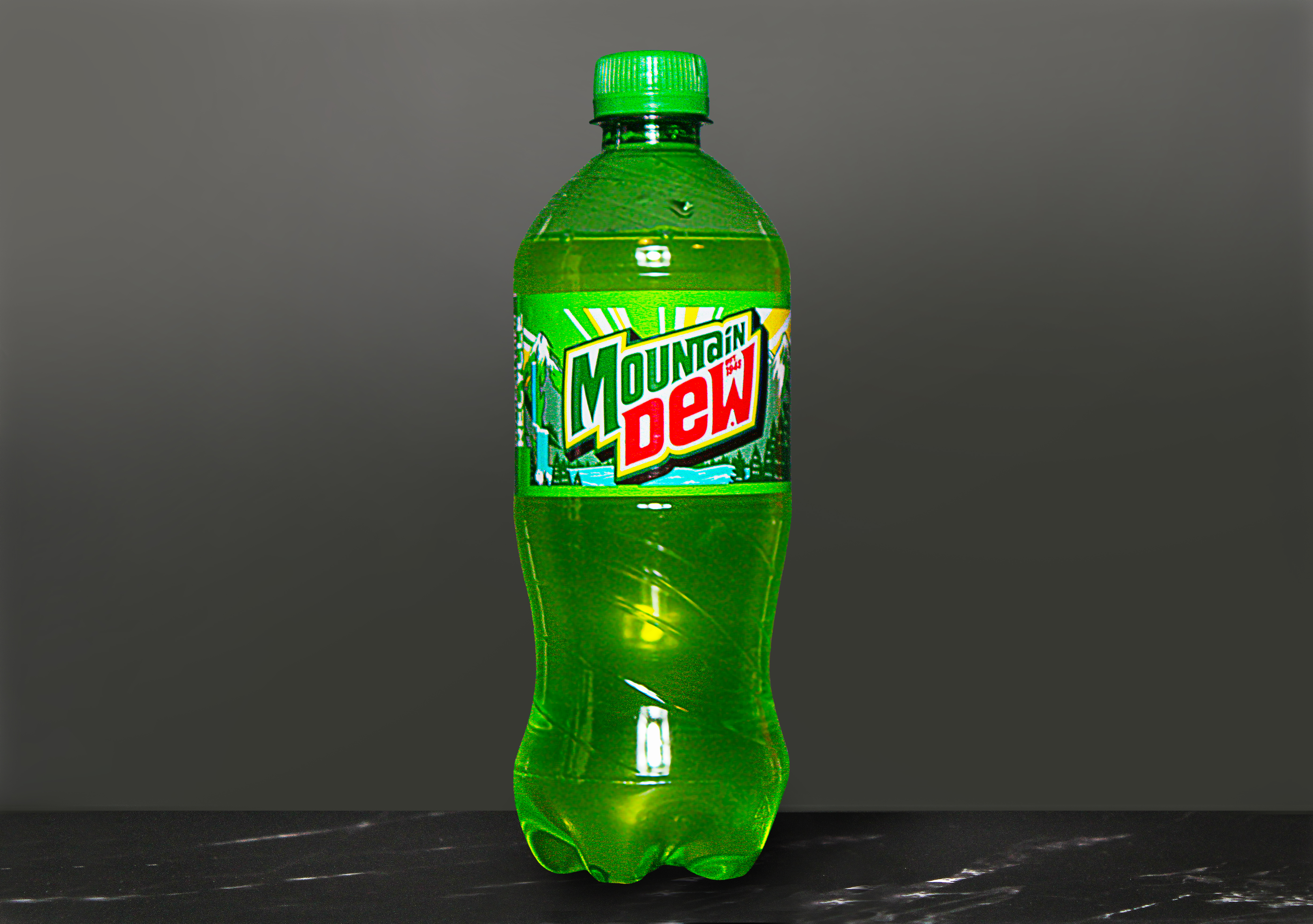
- 20-US-fluid-ounce (591 ml) bottle of Mountain Dew as sold in the United States
- Type: Soft drink
- Manufacturer: PepsiCo
- Origin: United States
- Introduced: November 12, 1948; 78 years ago (trademark granted)
- Color: Chartreuse
- Flavor: Citrus (for other variants, see List of Mountain Dew flavors and varieties)
- Related products: Mello Yello; Sun Drop; Surge; Dr. Enuf
- Website: mountaindew.com

Alternative logo with "Mtn Dew" lettering, used in the United States and other countries beginning 2016

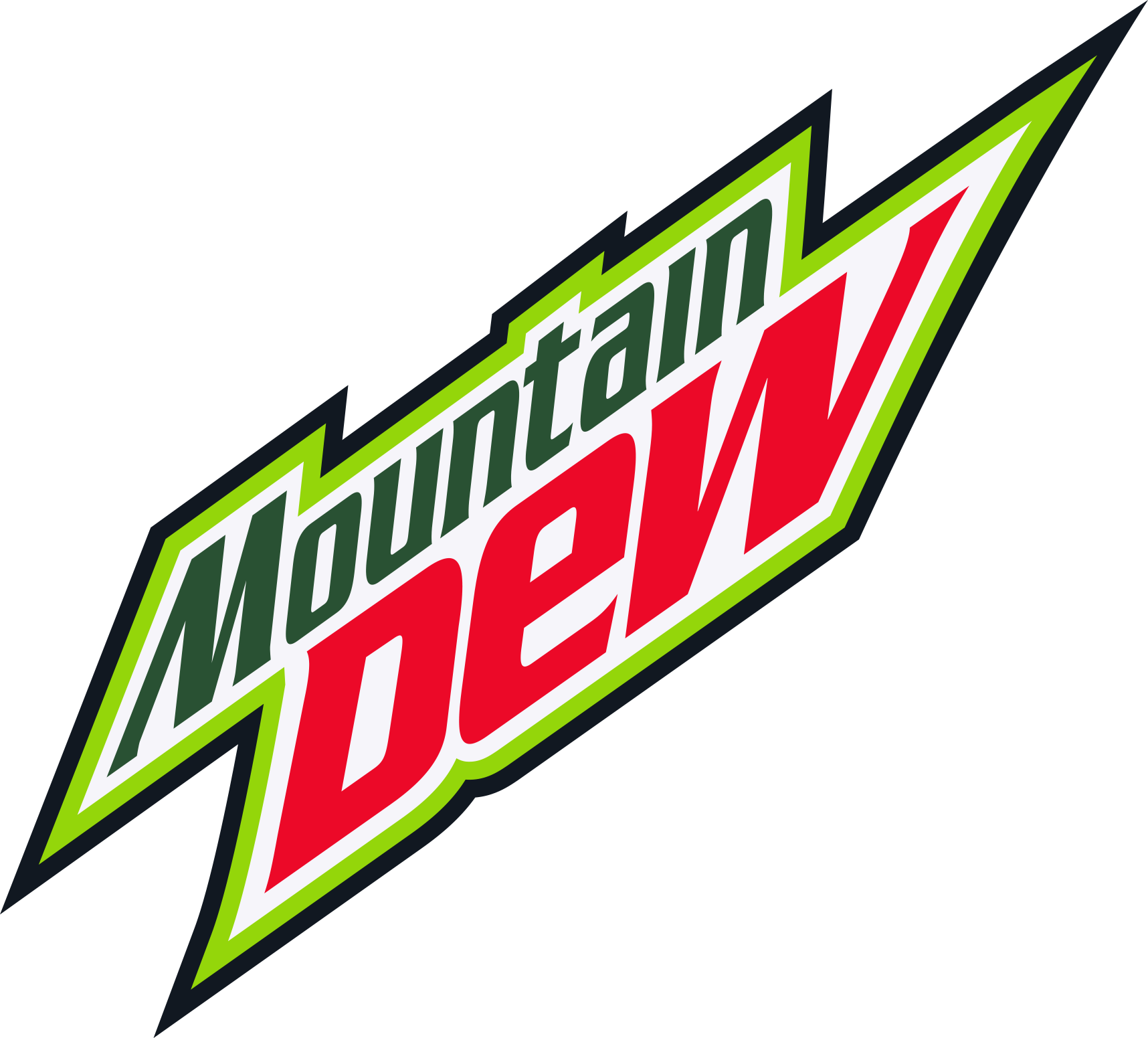
Alternative logo with "Mountain" fully spelled out

Mountain Dew, stylized as Mtn Dew in some countries and colloquially known as Dew in some areas, is a soft drink brand owned by PepsiCo. The original formula was invented in 1940 by Tennessee beverage bottlers Barney and Ally Hartman. A revised formula was created by Bill Bridgforth in 1958. The rights to this formula were obtained by the Tip Corporation of Marion, Virginia. William H. "Bill" Jones of the Tip Corporation further refined the formula, launching that version of Mountain Dew in 1961. In August 1964, the Mountain Dew brand and production rights were acquired from Tip by the Pepsi-Cola company, and the distribution expanded across the United States and Canada.

Between the 1940s and 1980s, there was only one variety of Mountain Dew, which was citrus-flavored and caffeinated in most markets. Diet Mountain Dew was introduced in 1988, followed by Mountain Dew Red, which was introduced and discontinued in 1988. In 2001, a cherry-flavored variant called Code Red debuted. Expansions of the product line have continued to this day, including specialty offerings, limited time productions, region-specific and retailer-specific flavors of Mountain Dew.

Production was extended to the United Kingdom in 1996, but was phased out in 1998. A similarly named but different-tasting product, with a recipe more similar to the original American product has been sold in the U.K. under the name "Mountain Dew Energy" since 2010 and in Ireland since the spring of 2011, but in 2015 it was changed to "Mountain Dew Citrus Blast" to shift away from the energy drink marketing. As of 2017, Mountain Dew represented a 6.6% share of the carbonated soft drinks market in the U.S., and is the leading soft drink brand in several states including almost the entire Midwestern United States. Its competition includes the Coca-Cola Company's Mello Yello and Surge, and Keurig Dr Pepper's Sun Drop; Mountain Dew accounted for 80% of citrus soft drinks sold within the U.S. in 2010.

== Origin ==
Tennessee bottlers Barney and Ally Hartman developed Mountain Dew as a mixer in the 1940s. The brothers, who had previously managed an Orange-Crush plant in Georgia, created the beverage in Knoxville, Tennessee after they were unable to find Natural Setup, their preferred lemon-lime soda for mixing with Old Taylor Kentucky Bourbon in the 1930s. Originally a 19th-century slang term for whiskey, especially Highland Scotch whisky, the Mountain Dew name was trademarked for the soft drink in 1948. Formulated by William Henry "Billy" Jones, the original 1940s recipe was a clear, highly carbonated lemon-lime drink similar to 7 Up or Sprite. The Hartmans debuted the product in 1946 using a "hillbilly" marketing campaign featuring labels drawn by John Brichetto that depicted a barefoot mountaineer with a rifle and moonshine jug.

Charles Gordon, who had partnered with William Swartz to bottle and promote Dr. Enuf, was introduced to Mountain Dew when he met the Hartman brothers on a train and they offered him a sample. Gordon and the Hartman brothers subsequently made a deal to bottle Mountain Dew by the Tri-Cities Beverage Corporation in Johnson City, Tennessee, where the flavor was later reformulated into a citrus-lemonade style in 1958.

The Tip Corporation of Marion, Virginia, bought the rights to Mountain Dew, revising the flavor and launching it in 1961. In 1964, Pepsico purchased the Tip Corporation and thus acquired the rights to Mountain Dew. In 1999, the Virginia legislature recognized Tip Corporation president Bill Jones and the town of Marion for their role in the history of Mountain Dew.

== Packaging ==
A 1950s Mountain Dew advertisement sign in Tonto, Arizona, showing the cartoon character "Willie the Hillbilly"

"Mountain Dew" was originally Southern and/or Scots-Irish slang for moonshine (i.e., homemade whiskey or poitín), a reference from the 1882 Irish folk song "The Rare Old Mountain Dew". Using it as the name for the soda was originally suggested by Carl E. Retzke at an Owens-Illinois Inc. meeting in Toledo, Ohio, and was first trademarked by Ally and Barney Hartman in the 1940s. Early bottles and signage carried the reference forward by showing a cartoon-stylized hillbilly. The first sketches of the original Mountain Dew bottle labels were devised in 1948 by John Brichetto, and the representation on product packaging has changed at multiple points in the history of the beverage.

=== Logo ===
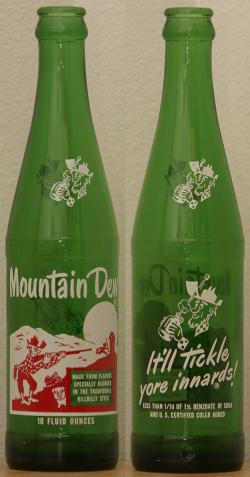
Two sides of an early Mountain Dew bottle using the "Hillbilly" design. These returnable bottles could be found in stores and vending machines until the late 1980s.

The Mountain Dew logo used from 1969 to 1996 was also used on Mountain Dew Throwback when it was introduced in 2009 and was later used on special glass bottles of the drink.

The fourth Mountain Dew logo, used from 1999 to 2005

PepsiCo (then The Pepsi-Cola Company) acquired the Mountain Dew brand in 1964, and shortly thereafter in 1969 the logo was modified as the company sought to shift its focus to a "younger, outdoorsy" generation. This direction continued as the logo remained the same through the 1970s, the 1980s, and the early 1990s. In 1996, PepsiCo began using a strategy it was already using with its flagship cola Pepsi, changing Mountain Dew's logo every few years. New logos were introduced in 1996, 1998, and 2005. In October 2008, the Mountain Dew logo was redesigned to "Mtn Dew" within the U.S. market, as a result of PepsiCo announcing that it would rebrand its core carbonated soft-drink products by early 2009. Returning flavors were given redesigned packaging and logos when re-released.

In October 2024, PepsiCo announced a major rebrand. The new branding, inspired by the logo introduced in 1996, reverts the naming to the full "Mountain" spelling; the key art features mountain scenery in the background.

=== Sidekick bottles ===
In summer 2010, a secondary type of Mountain Dew bottles began appearing on some US shelves. Designed by 4sight, a design and innovation firm, these bottles featured a sleeker design, smaller packaging labels, and a built-in grip. The bottles were dubbed "sidekick bottles" and were tested in North Carolina, South Carolina, and Indiana markets. By 2014, sidekick bottles had become the predominant Mountain Dew bottle design in most of the United States. In June 2025, Sidekick bottles began being largely phased out in the United states, though it remains in some areas.

== Ingredients ==
In its primary market of the United States, the ingredient composition of Mountain Dew is listed as: "carbonated water, high-fructose corn syrup (in much of the U.S.), concentrated orange juice, citric acid, natural flavors, sodium benzoate, caffeine, sodium citrate, erythorbic acid, gum arabic, Ethylenediaminetetraacetic acid, and yellow 5." The ingredient makeup of Mountain Dew varies based on the country of production. For example, in Canada, the sweetener listed is "glucose-fructose" (another name for high-fructose corn syrup), and until 2012, it was caffeine-free by default. Formerly, the composition included brominated vegetable oil, an emulsifier banned in foods throughout Europe and in Japan. As of 2020, this ingredient has been removed.

In response to negative publicity around high-fructose corn syrup, PepsiCo in 2009 released a limited-run production of Mountain Dew Throwback, a variation consisting of sugar in place of high-fructose corn syrup. Mountain Dew Throwback subsequently was re-released for brief periods (generally 8–12 weeks at a time), including a second wave from December 2009 to February 2010 and a third wave in the summer and fall of 2010. A fourth eight-week production run began in March 2011, before becoming a permanent addition to the Mountain Dew flavor line-up, until being discontinued again during the COVID-19 pandemic.

A 12 US fl oz (355 mL) can of Mountain Dew contains 54 mg of caffeine (equivalent to 152 mg/L).

=== Tartrazine ===
An urban legend about Mountain Dew ingredients is that dye Yellow #5 (tartrazine) lowers sperm count. Tartrazine has never been scientifically linked to any of the alleged effects in the legends, nor has any other component of the drink.

=== Alcohol ===
In 2022, PepsiCo partnered with the Boston Beer Company to produce a line of alcohol-infused drinks in four flavors. Labelled "Hard Mtn Dew", the drinks were initially sold in Florida, Iowa and Tennessee, before expanding to other states.

Despite having been on the market for a few years and the drink clearly stating it had alcohol in it, the drink gained some controversy in 2025 when a middle school teacher in San Antonio, Texas mistakenly gave five of his special education students cans of Hard Mountain Dew as an end-of-school-year treat, thinking it was regular Mountain Dew. The mistake led to an investigation by the school district after the parents of the students complained and in at least one case tried to file a police report.

== Promotions ==
=== Mountain Dew Amp ===
Mountain Dew Amp is an energy drink distributed by PepsiCo under the Mountain Dew brand, originally launched in 2001. From 2007 to 2008, several additional flavors of Amp were introduced. In 2012, Amp's labeling and ingredients changed, as did the flavor and appeal, according to fans. The Mountain Dew branding was also removed from cans during this change, though it has since been reintroduced.

=== Taco Bell's Mountain Dew Baja Blast ===
In spring 2014, Mountain Dew began distributing its Baja Blast flavor in standard 12-ounce cans, 20-ounce bottles and 24-ounce cans for sale at supermarkets and retail businesses in the U.S. This was to celebrate the drink's 10th anniversary and would be the first time the drink has been sold at retail. The new retail product bore the Taco Bell logo. Taco Bell's chief marketing officer, Chris Brandt, said the exclusive drinks have helped increase the company's beverage sales, even as soda sales have declined in the broader market. He noted that people are more likely to buy drinks when they are available exclusively at the chain. Due to the drink's success, many other new beverages were introduced at Taco Bell, including a new Taco Bell exclusive, Mountain Dew Sangrita Blast, a non-alcoholic sangrita-flavored Mountain Dew.

=== DEWmocracy 1 ===
DEWmocracy 1: People's Dew (2008) flavor finalists: Revolution, Voltage, and Supernova

Beginning in 2007, Mountain Dew began a promotion entitled "DEWmocracy", (Note: Officially stylized as DEWmocracy.) which involved the public electing new flavors, colors, names, packaging graphics and advertisements for upcoming Mountain Dew products. The campaign has been the subject of recognition within the advertising industry, cited as one of the earliest and longest-running examples of a consumer product brand employing crowdsourcing to make decisions which are traditionally made internally by employees. In its initial phase, DEWmocracy participation and voting was conducted via an online game. Television advertisements at the time featured actor Forest Whitaker asking people to decide the next new flavor of Mountain Dew. Online voters selected from three choices: Supernova (a strawberry/melon flavor), Revolution (a berry flavor), and Voltage (a raspberry/citrus flavor). Each included ginseng. The event ended on 17 August 2008, with Voltage announced as the winning flavor. It was officially released on 29 December 2008. According to Beverage Digest, sales of DEWmocracy flavors totaled 25 million cases in 2008.

=== DEWmocracy 2 ===
DEWmocracy 2: Collective Intelligence (2010) flavor finalists: White Out, Distortion, and Typhoon

Mountain Dew announced a continuation of the DEWmocracy campaign – referred to as "DEWmocracy 2" – which launched in July 2009. A marked difference between DEWmocracy 2 and its predecessor was the wider range of online voting methods, expanding beyond the DEWmocracy website to include Facebook, Twitter, YouTube, and the "Dew Labs Community" – a private, online forum for the "most passionate Dew fans." In July 2009, Dew Labs sampling trucks distributed product samples of seven potential flavor variations. At the same time, 50 "Dew fanatics" were chosen based on their video submissions to the video website 12seconds.tv, and were shipped boxes of the seven prototype flavors. From the initial seven flavors, taste testers were asked to elect three final flavors for later release at retail stores. The three new candidate flavors were Distortion (a Key lime flavor), Typhoon (a tropical punch flavor), and White Out (a smooth citrus flavor). The three new candidate flavors were released on 19 April 2010 and voting lasted until 14 June. The following day, White Out was announced as the winner. Mountain Dew White Out was released for sale on 4 October 2010. A limited production White Out Slurpee (Mtn Dew White Out Freeze) was made available at 7-Eleven stores beginning in January 2011. In July 2011, Mountain Dew Typhoon was re-released briefly in 2-liter form; in June 2022, it was re-released on the Mountain Dew online store.

=== Game Fuel ===
In 2007, after using the term "Game Fuel" to market their sodas to the video-gaming subculture, Mountain Dew introduced a new flavor variant (citrus cherry) with the Game Fuel name. Coinciding with the release of the Xbox 360 game Halo 3, Mountain Dew Game Fuel sported a label that was almost entirely image-based, showing promotional artwork for the game and featuring the game series' main character Master Chief prominently. This variant remained on shelves for 12 weeks, and was discontinued afterwards.

Two years later, the website for the popular MMORPG World of Warcraft stated that two Mountain Dew Game Fuel flavors would be sold in June 2009 and would promote the game. Shortly afterwards, the bottle art was released, and showed that the two flavors would promote different player races in the game. One of the two was exactly the same citrus cherry flavor from the original Halo 3 promotion, with updated packaging. The second flavor was a new wild fruit drink, similar to the previously released Pepsi Blue. Both drinks were given World of Warcraft-based packaging, and sported the newly updated "MTN Dew" logo. Like their precursor, these two flavors lasted for 12 weeks and were discontinued.

On 24 August 2011, Mountain Dew announced another return of the Game Fuel promotion on their Facebook page. The original citrus cherry would once again return, along with a new tropical companion flavor. The announcement gave a planned release date of October 2011 and stated that the packaging would feature codes granting players double experience points in Call of Duty: Modern Warfare 3. Both flavors were mailed out to Dew Labs members in early September 2011, a month before the planned release date. Later that same month, it was announced through the Facebook page that Game Fuel would be arriving to the public in mid-October, though it would vary by market. These flavors began appearing from the first week of October and were also discontinued after 12 weeks of being on shelves.

Game Fuel returned in October 2012 to promote Halo 4, in the original citrus-cherry flavor. In August 2013, Mountain Dew announced that Game Fuel would be returning to stores in the fall of 2013, with a new blueberry-flavored version titled "Electrifying Berry". In October 2013, boxes of original citrus cherry Game Fuel appeared on store shelves with packaging promoting the Xbox One and the games Dead Rising 3 and Forza Motorsport 5 and with cans featuring Dead Rising 3 graphics. The new Electrifying Berry flavor of Game Fuel simultaneously appeared with packaging promoting Kinect Sports Rivals and the game Ryse: Son of Rome, graphics from which appear on the cans as well. In May 2014, the original citrus cherry Game Fuel began reappearing on shelves, but this time, the soda does not seem to be promoting any video game.

In October 2014, Game Fuel returned with a new lemonade flavor for the promotion of Call of Duty: Advanced Warfare. Unlike past two-variant Game Fuel releases, both drinks sport the same artwork (unlike 2009's Horde Red and Alliance Blue or 2011's citrus cherry and tropical), albeit differing colors to match their respective flavors. After the promotion ended, Citrus Cherry reverted to packaging not promoting a game, while lemonade flavor was permanently removed from shelves.

In October 2015, Game Fuel returned with a new companion flavor, Berry Lime, for the promotion of Call of Duty: Black Ops III. After the promotion, Citrus Cherry once again reverted to promotion-less packaging, while the Berry Lime flavor remained available as a Slurpee.

Images leaked in May 2016 led to speculation that Game Fuel would once again see a new release later in 2016, with a new mango-flavored variant alongside the original citrus cherry flavor, promoting the game Titanfall 2. Mountain Dew announced the return of Game Fuel and the new flavor, Mango Heat, in September. Then, in October, Game Fuel was released with the Titanfall 2 promotion, with a lower calorie version of the original citrus cherry variant returning alongside the new Mango Heat.

In 2017, Game Fuel returned with two previously discontinued flavors: Arctic Burst (originally released as a Slurpee flavor in 2006 to promote Superman Returns) and Tropical Smash (originally Flavor #736, one of the four prototype flavors for "DEWmocracy II" that lost to Mountain Dew White Out and did not even make the final round). As was the case with the 2013 promotion, the two flavors promoted two different Xbox games (Arctic Burst promoted Middle-earth: Shadow of War while Tropical Smash promoted Forza 7). For the first time, Citrus Cherry was not fully part of the promotion; instead, promotion-less Citrus Cherry was sold with the same white caps with codes under them as the other flavors in the promotion.

In January 2019, PepsiCo introduced a new line of Game Fuel drinks called Amp Game Fuel, since renamed to simply "Game Fuel". The can features a re-sealable lid. Game Fuel has 90 mg of caffeine and also includes theanine and vitamins A and B. The Citrus Cherry flavor from the original Game Fuel lineup was re-released under this new product line in April 2022.

In 2023, Game Fuel returned with two flavors: Citrus Cherry and Mystic Punch. As was the case with the 2017 promotion, the two flavors promoted two different Xbox games (Citrus Cherry promoted Halo Infinite while Mystic Punch promoted Diablo IV).

=== Green Label ===
A limited edition bottle featuring Green Label art

Green Label is an online magazine, a partnership between Mountain Dew and Complex Media producing sponsored content covering action sports, music, art and style, housed at Green-Label.com. The site replaces several websites and a YouTube channel that have been overseen by PepsiCo since 2007. The initiative originated in 2013 and continued throughout the year.

==== Green Label Art ====
Mountain Dew's Green Label promotion originated in 2007, when a line of limited edition aluminum bottles was put into production, featuring artwork from a range of tattoo artists and other artists. This initial series marked the first use of the term Green Label Art to describe the use of artistic works on Mountain Dew packaging. In June 2010, a contest entitled "Green Label Art: Shop Series" was announced, involving 35 independent skateboard store owners who partnered with local artists to design and submit future can artwork designs. Approximately one million votes were submitted by the conclusion of the contest in October of the same year, with Street Science Skate Shop – a store in Tracy, California – named the winner of a cash prize. This winning can design was scheduled to appear on Mountain Dew cans at some point in 2011.

==== Green Label Sound ====
In 2008, a Mountain Dew-sponsored music label was launched under the name Green Label Sound. In December 2010, a Mountain Dew Code Red television advertisement was produced, incorporating the hip-hop artist Jay Electronica performing his song "The Announcement". The advertisement concludes with the tagline "Hip Hop is different on the mountain".

The label released its first full-length album release, When Fish Ride Bicycles by the hip hop group The Cool Kids, on 12 June 2011.

==== Dew Tour/Green Label experience ====
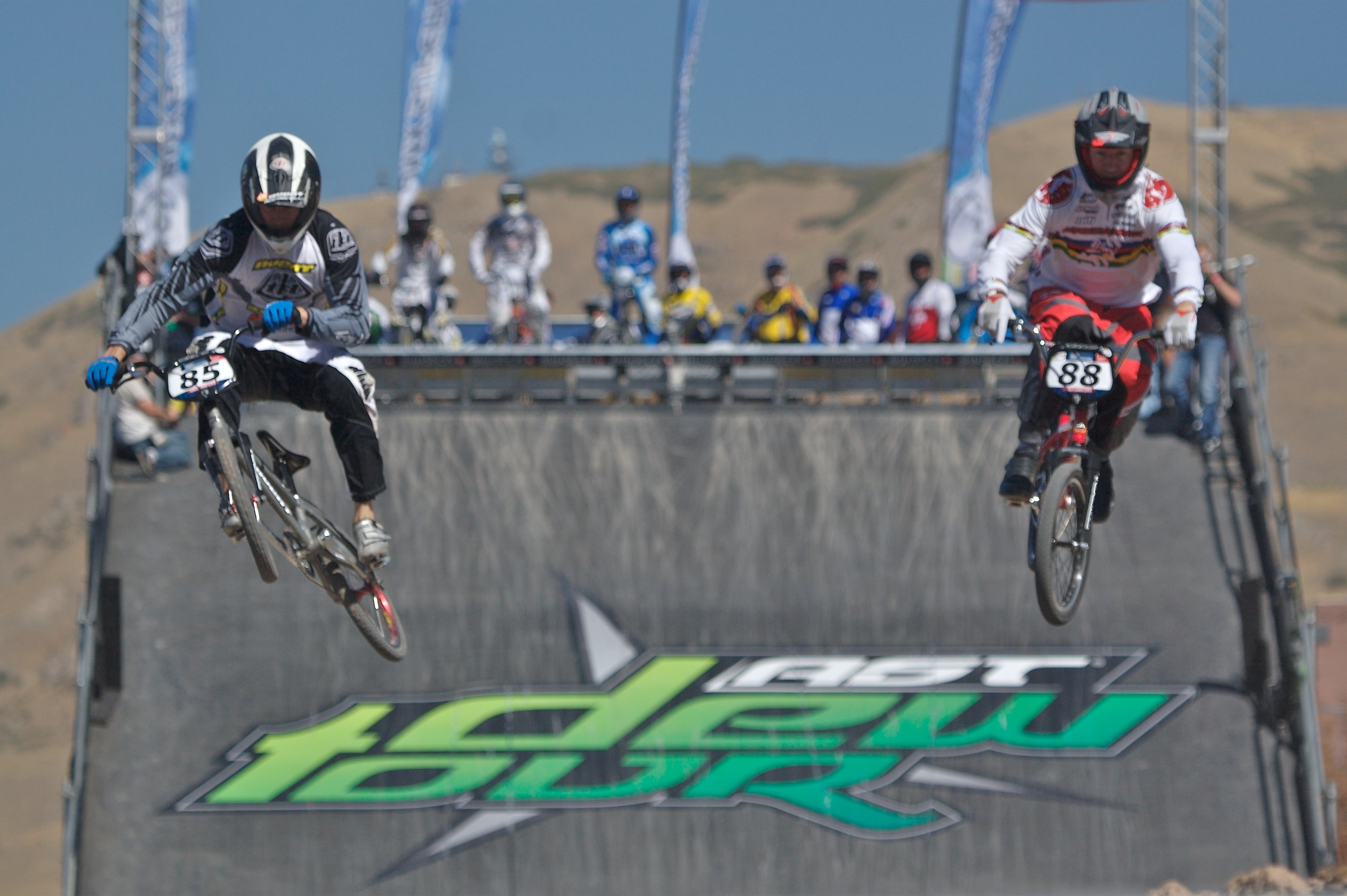
2007 Dew Tour BMX in Salt Lake City, Utah

Sponsorship of action sports athletes has been a part of Mountain Dew marketing since the late 1990s, with present sponsorship including Eli Reed (skateboarder), Paul Rodriguez (skateboarder), and Danny Davis (snowboarder). Mountain Dew also sponsors its own namesake festival, "The Dew Tour", which is an action sports tour made up of events held in five U.S. cities over several months. The first Dew Tour was held in the summer of 2005 with events in skateboarding, BMX and Freestyle Motocross. In 2008 it expanded to add a "Winter Dew Tour", comprising snowboarding and snow skiing competitions. It is "the most watched and attended action sports event in the world," according to Transworld Snowboarding magazine. In coordination with its Dew Tour sponsorship, a sponsored television show entitled Mountain Dew's Green Label Experience premiered on Fuel TV in July 2010, for the primary purpose of broadcasting interviews with action sports athletes from each of the stops on the Dew Tour.

==== Green Label Gaming ====
Under the term Green Label Gaming – coined in 2007 – Mountain Dew has broadened its sponsorship of independent video game designers and players. The brand was often the subject of media attention for its popularity among video game enthusiasts, as several flavors of Mountain Dew have been produced in partnership with video games. In December 2008, Mountain Dew produced a 30-minute television special which documented independent gamers in Japan and the U.S., which aired on the Spike TV network. In 2009, Mountain Dew sponsored two prominent gaming events: the Independent Games Festival and the Game Developers Conference. Green Label Gaming has since come under controversy over a sponsored Game Jam-themed reality show by Matti Leshem.

=== Doritos Quest ===
In 2008, Doritos debuted a mystery flavor known as "Quest", featuring a campaign of online puzzles and prizes to identify the Quest flavor. The flavor was later identified as Mountain Dew.

=== FanDEWmonium ===
In October 2010, Mountain Dew started the "FanDEWmonium" promotion, a competition in which new flavors would compete to become permanent similar to the two DEWmocracy campaigns, but with eight diet flavors instead of three regular ones. Five of the participating flavors were diet versions of previous DEWmocracy flavors: Diet Supernova, Diet Voltage, Diet Crave, Diet Distortion, Diet Typhoon, and Diet White Out. Another flavor, Diet Ultra Violet, returned from its own limited release in 2009. The remaining competitor was a brand-new Diet flavor created specifically for the promotion - Flare (berry/citrus-flavored). Each of the eight flavors was available for tasting at specific tour locations, and special cans were also mailed to some Dew Labs members.

Also similar to the DEWmocracy campaign, those who taste-tested the Diet flavors were asked to go online and vote for which flavors they thought should be permanently sold in stores. After the first round of voting was completed, two flavor finalists were chosen to receive a limited release to store shelves for a final round of voting. Diet Voltage and Diet Supernova were sold in stores for an eight-week period beginning in March 2011. After votes were cast, it was announced that Diet Supernova had won, with 55% of all votes, and it returned in January 2012. Afterwards, it was removed from shelves permanently after a 12-week release due to low sales.

=== Back by Popular DEWmand ===
On 7 January 2011, Mountain Dew posted on their Facebook that Pitch Black would return to the shelves in May 2011, also stating that this may be the start of many re-releases of old favorites. The company promoted Pitch Black's return heavily with giveaways and contests. About a month before the planned release date, a photo was posted on a Mountain Dew worker's Pongr, which showed Pitch Black and 2008's Supernova. Two weeks before the release, Dew Labs announced the return of 2010's Typhoon in 2-liter bottles exclusively at Walmart Supercenters. The three flavors were re-released to stores on 2 May.

At the same time of the DEWmand Promotion, Mountain Dew launched the Throwback Shack, a website where participators could enter to win exclusive Dew merchandise, including a "secret stash" of Mountain Dew Revolution, a losing competitor from 2008's DEWmocracy. The promotional advertisements were then taken down from the Mountain Dew website. Mountain Dew later stated via tweet that there would not be any more flavors returning 'by Popular DEWmand' for now, as it was only intended to be a summer program.

=== Dub the Dew ===
In August 2012, Villa Enterprises held a promotion known as Dub the Dew, where users were asked to submit and vote on name ideas for a green apple flavor of Mountain Dew. The promotion was infamously hijacked by users, particularly those originating from the imageboard 4chan, who submitted and upvoted entries such as "Hitler did nothing wrong", "Diabeetus", "Fapple", "Bill Cosby Sweat", "Jimmie Rustle's Jumpin' Juice", and numerous variations of "Gushing Granny". Although the promotion was not directly connected to Mountain Dew, a representative from the company did offer to "help clean up" the site. Adweek compared the incident to another recent campaign hijacked under similar circumstances, where musician Pitbull was sent to perform in Kodiak, Alaska, in a Walmart promotion.

=== Puppy Monkey Baby ===
On 7 February 2016, for Super Bowl 50, Mountain Dew aired a spot featuring a CGI character dubbed "the puppy monkey baby" (also styled PuppyMonkeyBaby). The promotion has garnered a wide amount of media coverage, both positive and negative. According to iSpot.tv, the spot was rated #1 of all the Super Bowl commercials of the night, having generated 2.2 million online views and 300,000 social media interactions after airing.

The ad features a computer-generated mash-up of three things that the public generally finds to be cute or harmless; a pug puppy (the head), a monkey (the body and tail), and a dancing baby (the hips and legs). The puppy monkey baby dances with three men who are presumably watching the Super Bowl, offering them Mountain Dew Kickstart, which is similarly described as being a combination of three things (Mountain Dew, juice, and caffeine).

The media response to the advertisement was mixed to negative. Melissa Cronin of Gawker described it as a "horror-hallucination of brand awareness", while noting the beverage itself contains brominated vegetable oil, a chemical that is banned in several countries. Jim Joseph, chief integrated marketing officer at Cohn & Wolfe, called it "weird".

=== DEWcision 2016 ===
On 16 April 2016, Mountain Dew announced the return of two popular favorites, Baja Blast and Pitch Black. Fans could vote on which flavor stays permanently on store shelves via the Mountain Dew website. Voting ended on 9 July, and, after many delays, Pitch Black was announced the winner on 18 July 2016. Pitch Black became part of the brand's flavor lineup starting in September, and was produced for several years before being discontinued by early 2020.

=== Mountain Dew Spark and Spark Zero ===
Mountain Dew Spark is a raspberry lemonade flavored beverage and a part of the Mountain Dew line up of offerings.

=== KFC's Sweet Lightning ===
In 2019, Mountain Dew introduced a peaches and honey flavored variant called Sweet Lightning, as an exclusive KFC menu item.

== In popular culture ==
The computer worm Code Red was named because the person who discovered the worm was drinking this version of Mountain Dew at the time.

In the musical Be More Chill, green Mountain Dew activates the "squip", a tiny super-computer in a pill that tells the user what to do, in order to help them achieve their goals. Mountain Dew Red shuts them off. In the musical, it is said that this is the reason for Mountain Dew Red being discontinued.

Bakar's song "Hell N Back" includes the lyric "She liked petty crimes, she had green eyes like Mountain Dew." Sabrina Carpenter's 2024 hit song "Espresso" included the lyric "I know I Mountain Dew it for ya".

== See also ==
- List of Mountain Dew flavors and varieties
- List of citrus soft drinks
- Surge
