= Storm (soft drink) =

Lemon-lime-flavored soft drink

- Type: Lemon-lime soft drink
- Manufacturer: PepsiCo
- Distributor: PepsiCo
- Country of origin: United States
- Introduced: 1998
- Discontinued: 2000
- Color: Clear
- Flavor: Lemon-Lime
- Variants: Light Storm
- Related products: Lemon-Lime Slice, Mountain Dew Ice, Sierra Mist, Sprite, Starry

Storm was a lightly carbonated, caffeinated lemon-lime flavored soft drink. It was test marketed by PepsiCo in some areas of the U.S. in 1998 as part of Pepsi's attempt to become more competitive in the U.S. clear lemon-lime soda market, one that was dominated by Coca-Cola's Sprite. Storm differed from Sprite in that its flavor was uniquely subtle and had a very slight bitterness to it, as well as having caffeine.

Although Storm was only offered in test markets, Pepsi included it in their marketing of Star Wars: Episode I – The Phantom Menace, and offered cans with characters in both Storm and Light Storm varieties.

Pepsi already had an existing offering, lemon-lime Slice, although it, like Sprite, was caffeine-free.

Pepsi dropped Storm while it was still in the test market stage. Test markets included Denver, Indianapolis, Omaha, San Francisco, Sacramento, Grass Valley, Las Vegas, Milwaukee, and Philadelphia. Lemon-lime Slice was dropped in favor of a new formula, marketed as Sierra Mist, in 2000.

== See also ==
- List of defunct consumer brands
