= Teem =

Brand of soft drink

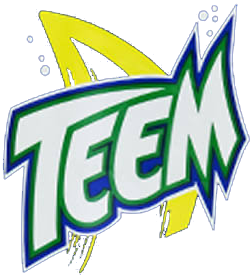
- Product type: Lemon-lime drink
- Current owner: PepsiCo
- Country: Mainly Middle East & Africa
- Introduced: April 10, 1959
- Discontinued: 1984; 42 years ago (U.S. only) (Note: That year discontinued in the U.S.; 1990s in some other markets, still produced in some countries.)
- Related brands: Sprite, 7 Up (successor, internationally), Slice (successor), Sierra Mist, Starry
- Markets: Worldwide (majority in Africa, Indian subcontinent, & Latin America)

Teem is a brand of carbonated soft drink introduced by PepsiCo in 1959 as a lemon-lime-flavored competitor of 7 Up. It was discontinued and delisted in the US in 1984, but it continues in use in Brazil and Uruguay.

Teem is no longer available in most of the world, however Uruguay, and some countries in African and Asian regions produce a Teem branded cola under their manufacturing plants.

== Overview ==
In the pre-planning stages, Teem was known as "Duet"; however, due to a potential trademark dispute with Swift's, a food manufacturer with a margarine carrying the same brand, the name was changed before marketing could begin. On April 10, 1959, three Pepsi-Cola representatives from Chicago, New York, and San Francisco converged on St. Joseph, Missouri, to give the public the first taste of the new drink, as the city was chosen for Teem's primary distribution market before being introduced elsewhere. Three days later, on the following Monday, advertisements cropped up in area newspapers advertising the drink as being for sale in stores. Teem was sold in the United States and Canada until it was discontinued in 1984 due to declining sales. Lemon-Lime Slice was introduced to replace Teem, though it was still available at some soda fountains into the 1990s. Later, Sierra Mist, and then Starry, became Pepsi's lemon-lime soda offerings in the US.

Teem remains on sale today in Pakistan, Brazil, Uruguay, Honduras, Nepal, Nigeria, India, and South Africa; it survived into the 1990s in other markets, too, before Pepsi authorized vendors to replace it with 7up due to the sale of the international rights of that brand to Pepsi by Philip Morris. Pepsi has a lemon-lime soda monopoly in several countries by selling 7up and Teem together.
