= Palace Grocery =

New Mexico Defunct Grocery store

- Founded: 1959; 67 years ago in Santa Fe, United States
- Founder: Rebecca Sais
- Defunct: 2007
- Fate: closed
- Headquarters: 853 E Palace Ave, Santa Fe, New Mexico
- Key people: Meliton Vigil; Yolanda Vigil

Palace Grocery is a defunct grocery store located on Palace Avenue in Santa Fe, New Mexico.

== History and description ==
The 1,693 square-foot Palace Grocery was opened in 1959 by Rebecca Sais who operated the store until 1968 when she transferred ownership to her niece Yolanda Vigil and her husband Meliton and was owned and operated by the couple for 39 years until Yolanda's death in 2007. Over that period, the store was kept up-to-date, first by selling "pantry staples" before transitioning to more of a convenience store later on. The interior, however, has remained largely unchanged from its opening in the late 60s, with Curbed.com calling it "something straight out of a zombie movie set." The building still contains items from that era, including a "vintage" National cash register, wooden 7-Up crates, salt, borax and Clorox "neatly lined up on the matching blue display cases".
