= Boga (soft drink) =

Tunisian soft drink

- The Boga Logo.
- Type: Soft drink
- Manufacturer: SFBT
- Distributor: SFBT
- Origin: Tunisia
- Introduced: 1947
- Flavor: Lim (which has a lemon-lime flavor), Light, Cidre (flavored with carob extract), Mojito, Mint

Boga (Tunisian Arabic: بوڨا) is a brand of Tunisian carbonated soft drinks, produced by the Tunisian Beverage Manufacturing Company (SFBT). The name "Boga" is the contraction of the French words for beverage "Boisson" and carbonated "Gazeuze". Boga is commercialized under 5 different flavors.

== Flavors ==
The Boga Lim is a non-colored version. This version is sweetened and has a lemon-lime flavor. Its taste is similar to drinks such as 7 Up or Ramune. Its packaging is recognized as being mainly green.

The Boga Light, has a similar flavor and appearance to the Boga Lim. However Boga Light is sweetened with an artificial sweetener instead of sugar. Its packaging is mainly blue.

The Boga Cidre, is a dark brown colored version. "Cidre" means cider in French, however it is not a cider made of apples but of carobs. This boga is described as having a very peculiar taste, close to banana or Root beer due to the carob extract it contains. Its packaging is mainly yellow.

The Boga Mojito, is a light green colored version. It is made to be similar in flavor to the Mojito. Its packaging is light green, with limes and lemons depicted next to the logo.

The last version is the Boga Menthe. "Menthe" meaning mint in French. This version is bright green in color and is the association of the Boga Lim with mint syrup, giving it a distinctive mint-lime taste. Its packaging is mainly dark green.

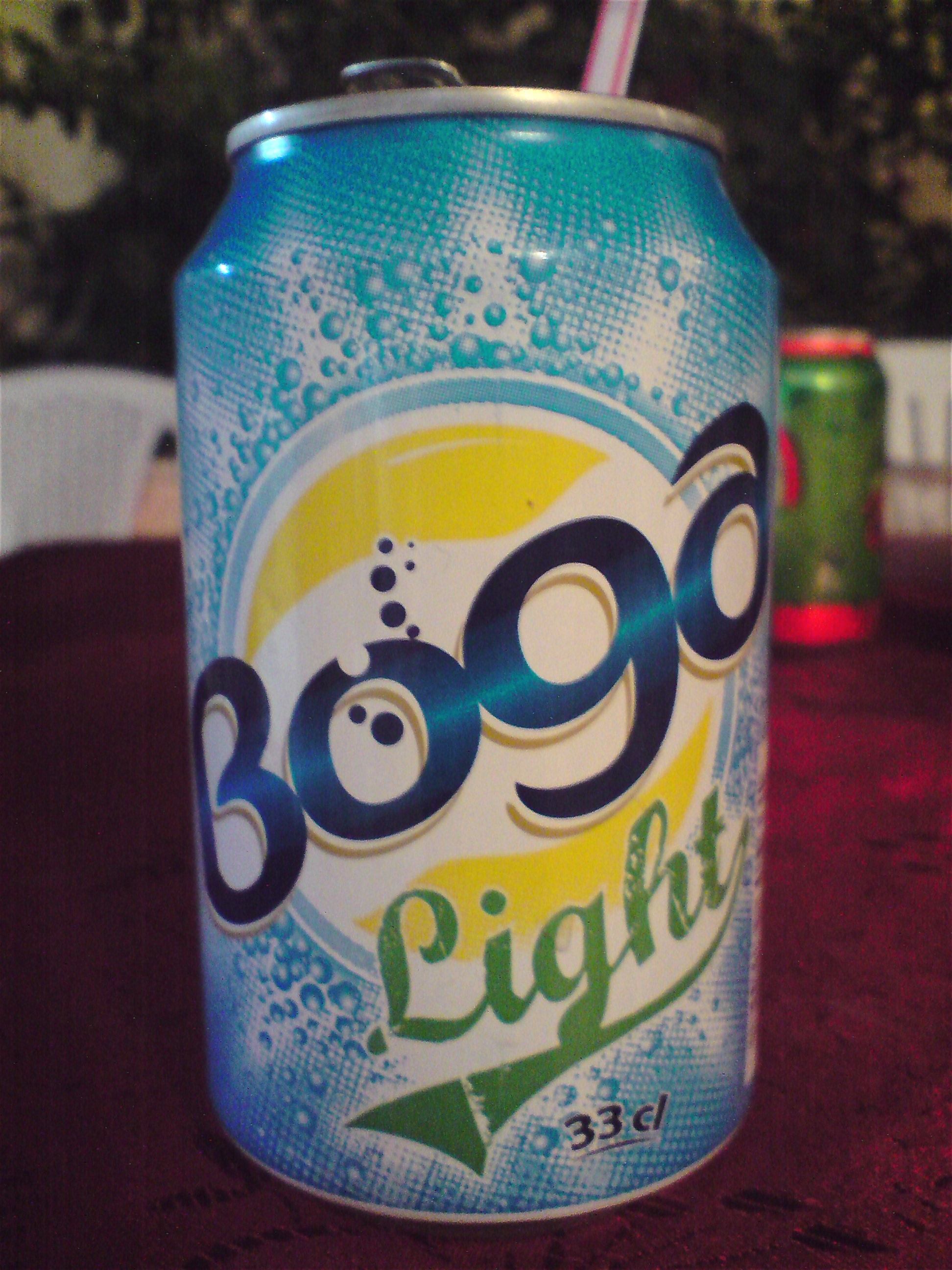
Can of Boga Light

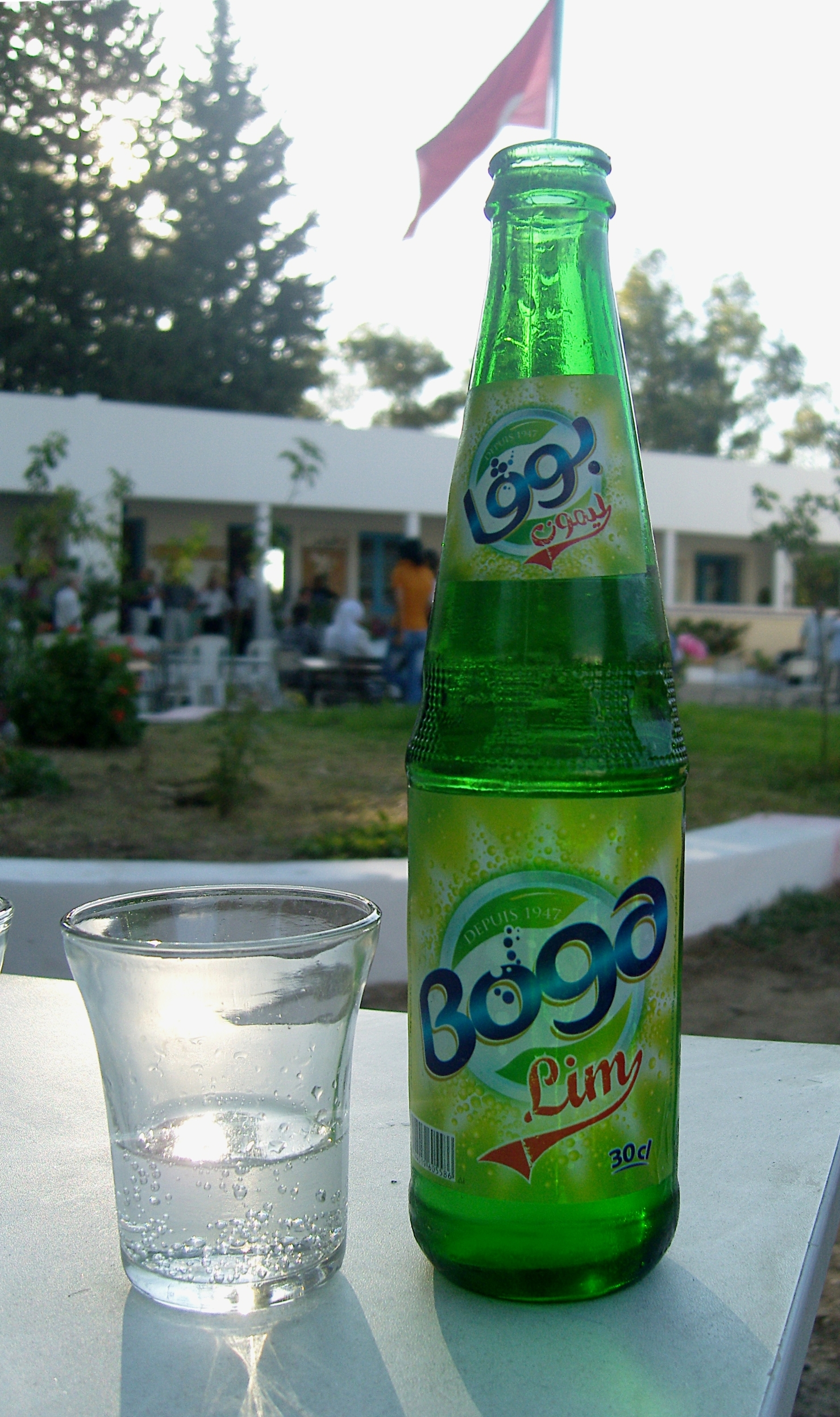
Bottle of Boga Lim

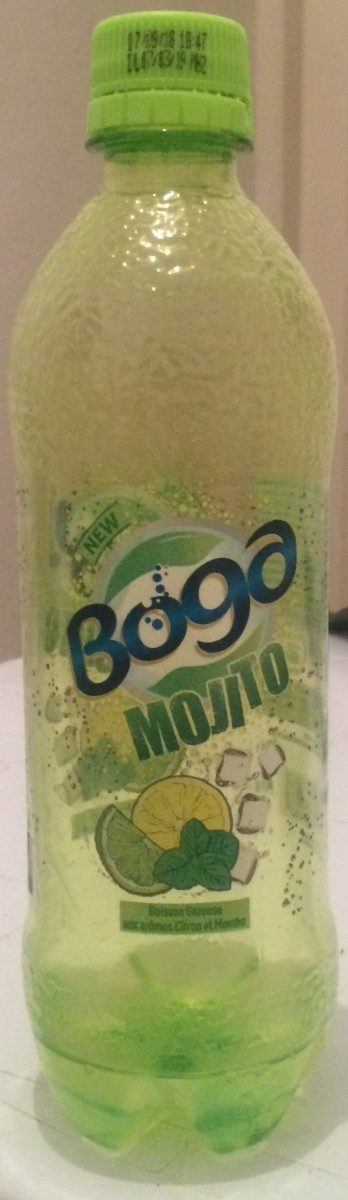
Bottle of Boga Mojito

== See also ==
- List of soft drinks by country
- Tunisian cuisine
