= Sierra Mist =

Discontinued lemon-lime flavored soda

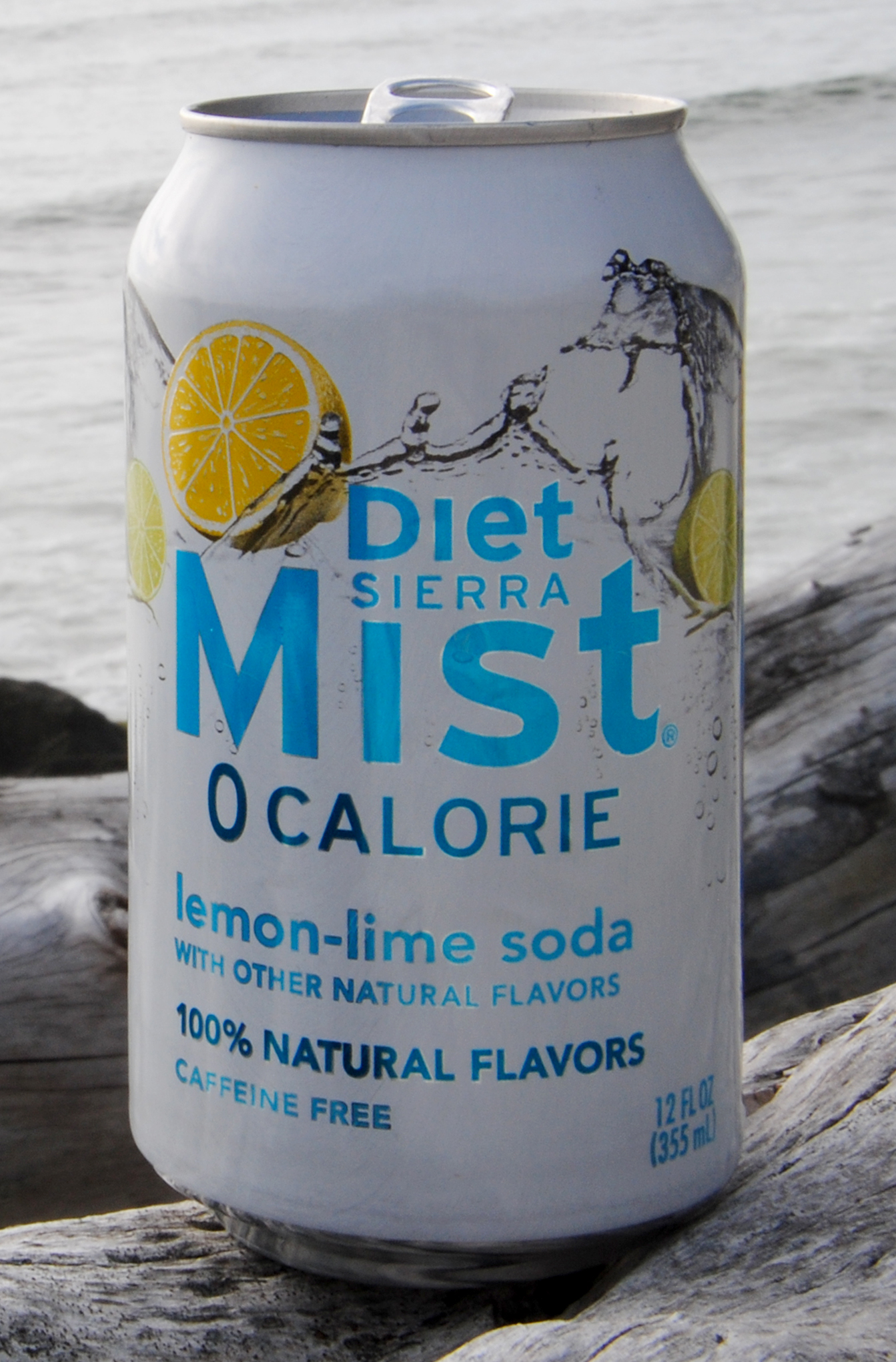
- Product type: Lemon-lime soft drink
- Current owner: PepsiCo
- Country: U.S.
- Introduced: May 7, 1999; 27 years ago
- Discontinued: January 8, 2023; 3 years ago
- Related brands: Teem; 7 Up; Lemon-lime Slice (predecessor); Storm; Starry (successor); Sprite (drink)
- Website: Archived official website at the Wayback Machine (archive index)

Sierra Mist was a lemon-lime flavored soft drink line introduced by PepsiCo in 1999. By 2003, it was available in all US markets. The name is a play on Mountain Dew: sierra is the Spanish word for "mountain range" and both mist and dew are composed of water droplets. The brand was aimed at competing with Sprite and 7 Up.

The drink was rebranded as "Mist Twst" in 2016, but reverted to "Sierra Mist" in 2018. Sierra Mist was replaced by Starry in 2023.

== Composition ==
=== Original formula ===
From 2000 until 2006, Sierra Mist was sweetened with high-fructose corn syrup and sugar. From 2006 until 2010, it was sweetened with only high-fructose corn syrup. Its other ingredients were listed as carbonated water, citric acid, natural flavors, potassium benzoate, potassium citrate, ascorbic acid and calcium disodium EDTA. Diet Sierra Mist was sweetened with aspartame and acesulfame potassium.

=== Sierra Mist Natural ===
In August 2010, PepsiCo replaced the original Sierra Mist formula with Sierra Mist Natural, which was sweetened with sucrose (table sugar) instead of high fructose corn syrup. The new formulation contained five other ingredients: carbonated water, citric acid, natural flavor, potassium citrate, and ethylenediaminetetraacetic acid.

=== Addition of stevia ===
By 2013, Sierra Mist Natural reverted its name to simply Sierra Mist, and in 2014 the formulation was changed to use a combination of sucrose and stevia as sweeteners, in an effort to cut calories in drinks. The change proved unpopular, with complaints of the stevia introducing an unpleasant aftertaste.

=== Mist Twst ===
In December 2015, PepsiCo announced that they were changing the name of Sierra Mist to "Mist Twst" in spring 2016. The change occurred in some areas in March 2016. The new Mist Twst added high-fructose corn syrup back to the formula.

=== Re-rebranding of Sierra Mist and discontinuation ===
In July 2018, Mist Twst’s name reverted to Sierra Mist.

In January 2023, Pepsi announced the discontinuation of the brand; Sierra Mist has been replaced with Starry.

== Promotion and sponsorship ==
In 2005, a series of improv-based Sierra Mist commercials titled "Mist Takes" began airing. The commercials featured comedians Nicole Sullivan, Debra Wilson, Aries Spears, Jim Gaffigan and Michael Ian Black. In 2006, Kathy Griffin, Tracy Morgan and Guillermo Diaz joined the cast. Diaz and other members of the cast of Otro Rollo starred in the Spanish-language versions of the commercials. In 2007, Nicole Randall Johnson and Eliza Coupe joined the cast, replacing Debra Wilson and Kathy Griffin.

In the summer of 2007, PepsiCo released "Sierra Mist: Undercover Orange" and "Sierra Mist Free: Undercover Orange" as a limited-time marketing tie-in with the release of the Warner Bros. film Get Smart. Sierra Mist: Undercover Orange and Sierra Mist Free: Undercover Orange were both clear sodas, like regular and Diet Sierra Mist, but had a mandarin orange flavor.

Sierra Mist was an official partner and sponsor of Major League Soccer and two franchises within the league, the New England Revolution and D.C. United. The league deal ended in 2015 when Coca-Cola announced a partnership with MLS and the US Soccer Federation.

== Product variants ==
Discontinued products
Name	Dates of production	Description
Sierra Mist (HFCS version)	1999–2010 2016–2018	Lemon-lime soda with lemon and lime flavors. Sierra Mist was replaced by "Sierra Mist Natural" in August 2010, although this variety of Sierra Mist remained stocked at many retailers until late 2010. In 2013, the name would be used again for Sierra Mist (with real sugar).
Sierra Mist Zero Sugar	2000–2016, 2018–2023	Lemon-lime soda containing 100-percent natural flavors and zero calories. Diet Sierra Mist contained sucralose and acesulfame potassium as its artificial sweeteners. Formerly known as "Diet Sierra Mist"
Sierra Mist Free	2004–2008	Temporary name of Diet Sierra Mist.
Sierra Mist Cranberry Splash	2006–2016	Cranberry flavored Sierra Mist made with natural flavor and real sugar. Cranberry Splash was only widely available during the winter holiday season. In some places such as North Carolina, this variant was available year-round. A new logo was unveiled September 2014 for year-round distribution, and later unveiled during the 2014 holiday season everywhere else.
Diet Sierra Mist Cranberry Splash	2006–2016	A zero-calorie version of Sierra Mist Cranberry Splash made with natural flavors. Diet Sierra Mist Cranberry Splash contained artificial sweeteners.
Sierra Mist Free Cranberry Splash	2007	Temporary name of Diet Sierra Mist Cranberry Splash.
Sierra Mist Lemon Squeeze	2007	Sierra Mist Lemon Squeeze was introduced in May 2007. This limited edition featured an extra bit of lemon taste and was only available through September 2007.
Sierra Mist Undercover Orange	2008	Limited-edition orange flavored Sierra Mist released in conjunction with the film Get Smart. Sierra Mist Undercover Orange was only available during the summer of 2008.
Sierra Mist Free Undercover Orange	2008	A zero-calorie version of limited-edition Sierra Mist Undercover Orange.
Diet Sierra Mist Ruby Splash	2009–2011	A zero-calorie Sierra Mist with ruby grapefruit flavors. Diet Sierra Mist Ruby Splash was made with all natural flavors and contained artificial sweeteners.
Sierra Mist Ruby Splash	2009–2010	Ruby grapefruit flavored Sierra Mist variety, the regular version was discontinued in 2010, but the Diet version remained until 2011.
Sierra Mist (with real sugar)	2010–2016, 2018–2023	Lemon-lime flavored soft drink made with natural lemon and lime flavors, real sugar and other natural ingredients. Formerly known as Sierra Mist Natural. A new logo was unveiled September 2014 to consumers. As of 2016, Sierra Mist (with real sugar) remains stocked at some locations alongside Mist Twst. In 2018, following the rebranding back to Sierra Mist, the flavor returned to stores, but was discontinued in 2023.
Sierra Mist Strawberry Kiwi Splash	2012	A limited-edition Strawberry-Kiwi flavored soft drink made with natural flavors, real sugar and other natural ingredients.
Mist Twst	2016–2018	Lemon-lime soda with lemon and lime flavors, with a splash of real juice.
Mist Twst Cherry	2016–2018	Cherry flavored variant of Mist Twst.
Mist Twst Cranberry	2016–2018	Cranberry flavored variant of Mist Twst.
Diet Mist Twst	2016–2018	Diet version of Mist Twst.
Diet Mist Twst Cranberry	2016–2018	Diet version of Mist Twst Cranberry.
Starry	2023–present	Modified version of Sierra Mist, replacing Sierra Mist.
