= Fruktsoda =

Lemon-lime flavored soft drink from Sweden

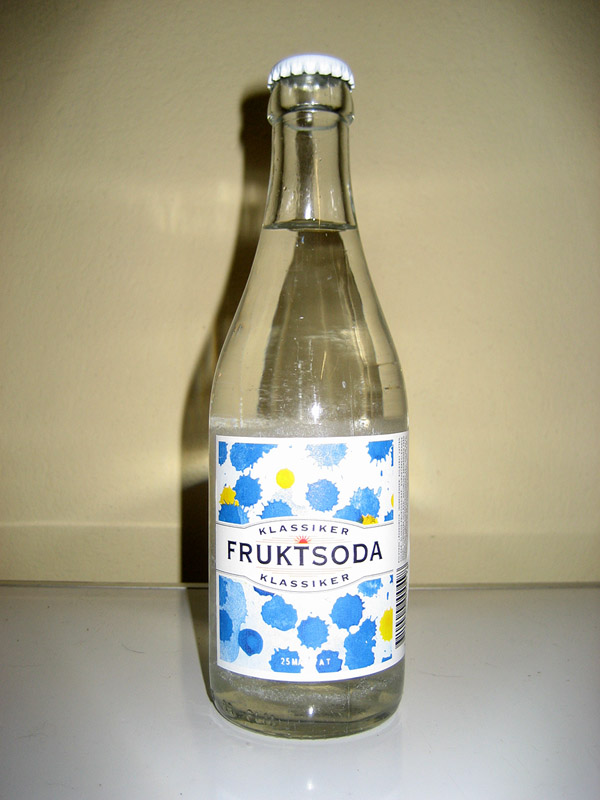
Swedish lemon-lime soft drink Fruktsoda.

Fruktsoda (Swedish for 'fruit soda') is a lemon-lime flavored soft drink from Sweden, similar to 7 Up and Sprite. Fruktsoda is made by various breweries in Sweden. It is also a popular ingredient in cocktails.
