= Upper 10 =

Lemon-lime soft drink

- Type: Lemon-lime soft drink
- Manufacturer: RC Cola
- Distributor: RC Cola
- Origin: United States
- Introduced: 1933
- Flavour: Lemon-Lime
- Related products: 7 Up, Sprite, Starry

Upper 10 is a caffeine-free lemon-lime soft drink, similar to Coca-Cola's Sprite, Dr Pepper’s 7 Up, Pepsi's Starry, and Bubble Up. It was bottled by RC Cola.

The Upper 10 brand debuted in 1933 as a product of the Nehi Corporation (later Royal Crown Corporation). Upper 10 was one of RC Cola's flagship brands throughout the company's history. However, with the acquisition of RC Cola by Cadbury Schweppes plc in 2000 and subsequent folding of company operations into Dr Pepper, Inc., bottlers have gradually discontinued bottling Upper 10 in favor of the similar, more popular and non-caffeinated 7 Up (which is also owned by Dr Pepper Snapple Group).

Upper 10 is still sold outside North America by Cott Beverages, the same company that sells RC Cola internationally.
