= Like Cola =

Soft drink

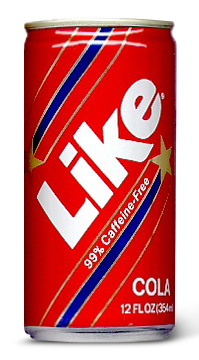
- Type: Cola
- Manufacturer: The Seven Up Company
- Origin: United States
- Introduced: 1982; 44 years ago
- Related products: 7 Up

Like Cola was a cola soft drink, introduced by the 7 Up company (then under the ownership of Philip Morris), that appeared in the American market in 1982. Its slogan was "Made From The Cola Nut." Like Cola was one of the first attempts at a low-caffeine cola, containing 1% caffeine. It was packaged in a red and blue can. A diet version was also available, with the color scheme reversed. Like Cola was also packaged in 1 pint (16 ounce) clear bottles embossed with shooting stars.

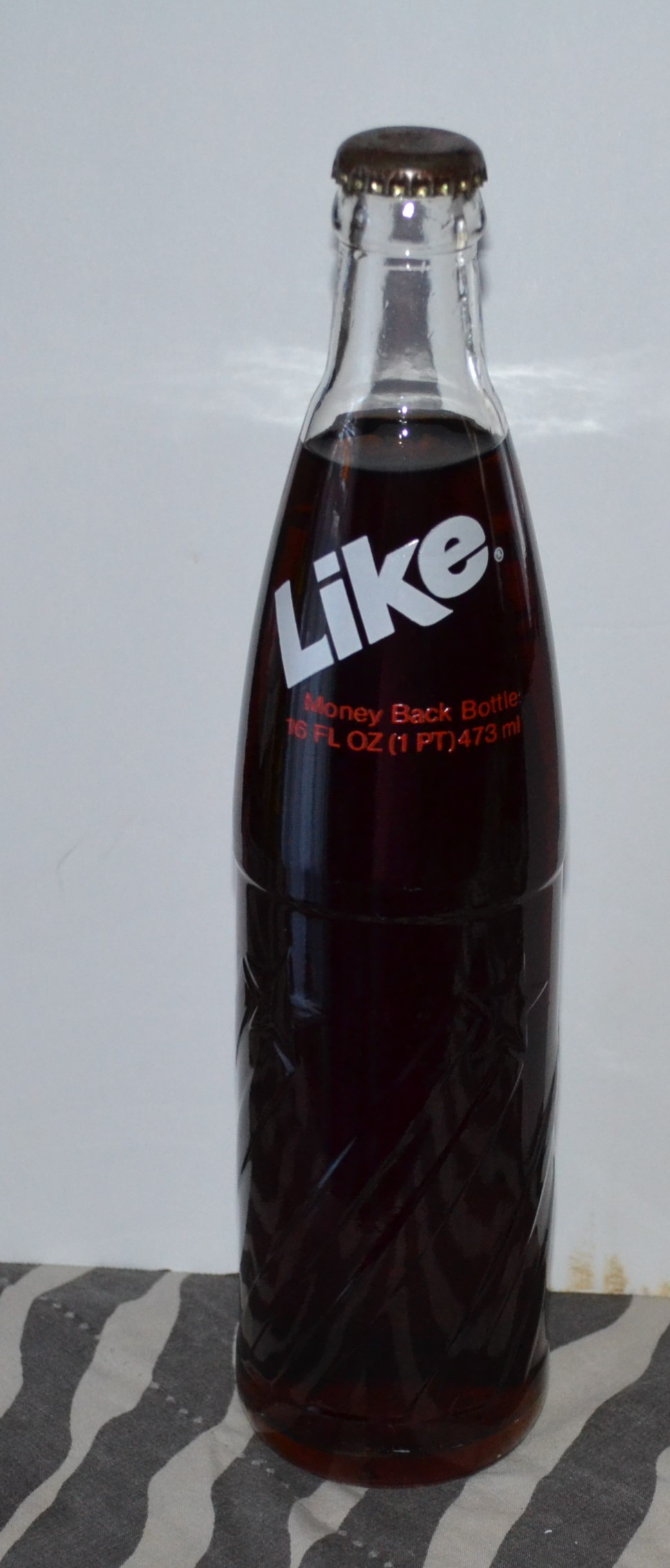
Like Cola in 16 ounce embossed bottle circa 1982

Like Cola was the major sponsor of one of the races in the 1983 NASCAR Winston Cup Series that occurred on July 24 of that year – the Like Cola 500 at Pocono Raceway in Long Pond, Pennsylvania. Tim Richmond won that race. Commercials for the product featured comedian Tim Conway and actor Kevin Dobson as spokespersons.

Because several 7 Up bottlers also distributed colas such as Coca-Cola, Pepsi-Cola or eventual 7 Up sister drink RC Cola (which introduced another caffeine-free cola, RC 100, in 1980), they refused to distribute Like Cola. This limited the soda's availability.

After Philip Morris sold the domestic rights of 7 Up to the parent company of Dr Pepper and the international rights to PepsiCo in 1986, a phase out of Like Cola marketing began. The product disappeared around 1992. Except for in Malta where it is still produced by Simonds Farsons Cisk.

The Like name was first used from 1963 to 1969 for 7 Up's diet lemon-lime soda; it was renamed Diet 7 Up.

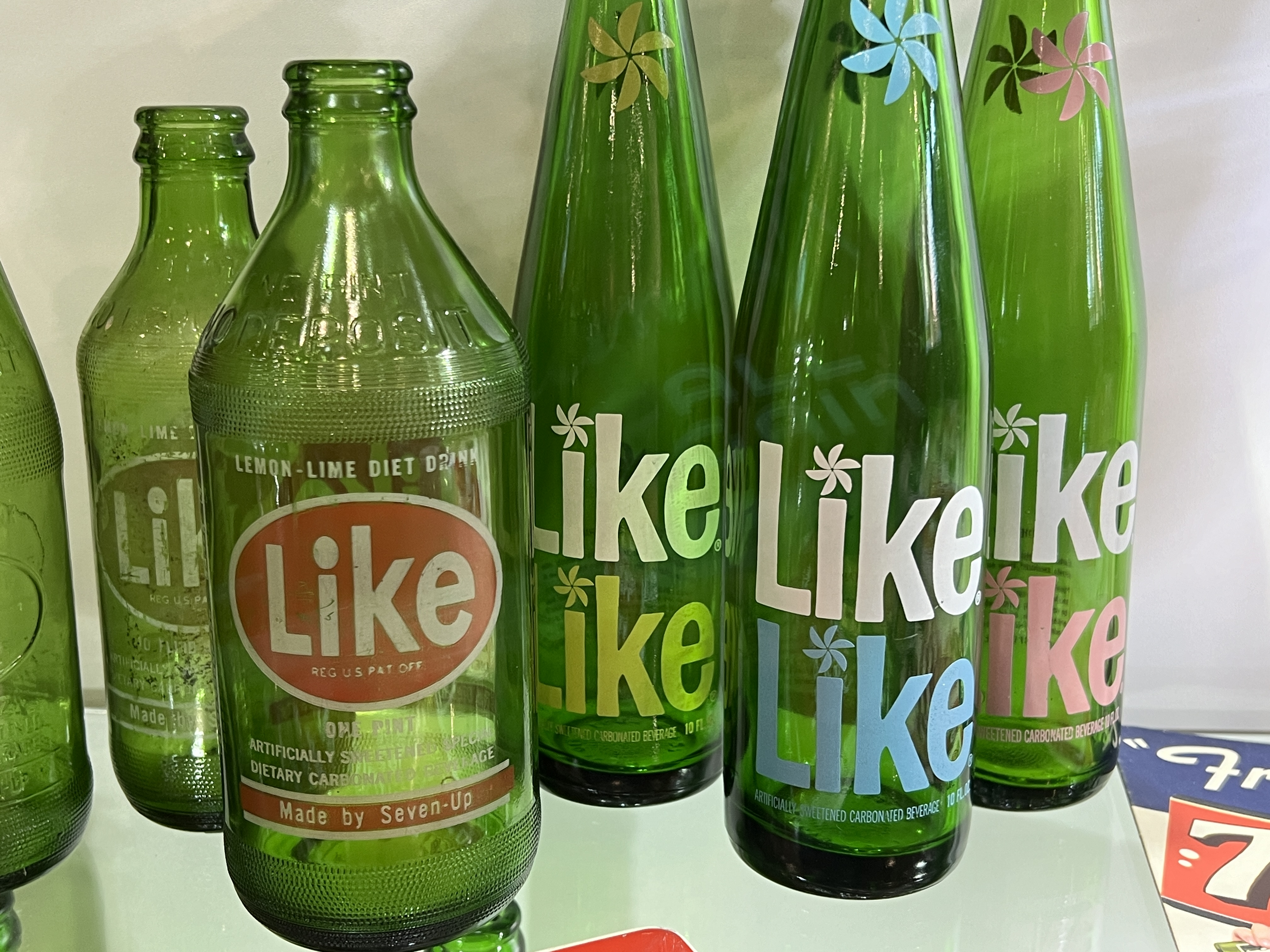
Like bottles archived at the Soda Museum in St. Charles, MO

== See also ==
- Pepsi Free
- Pepsi Light
- Crystal Pepsi
- New Coke
