= List of lemon-lime drink brands =

Carbonated soft drink with lemon and lime flavoring

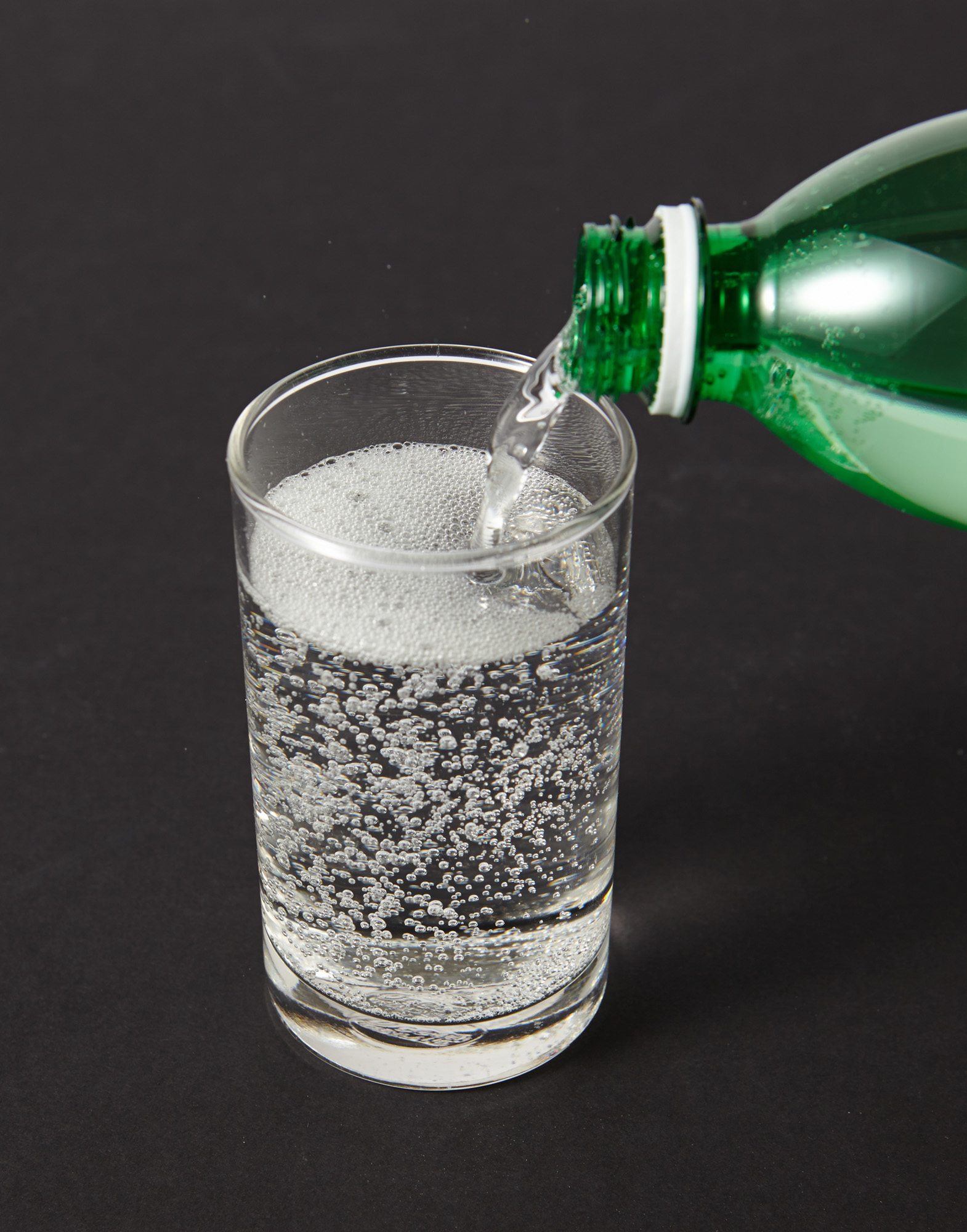
Lemon-lime drink

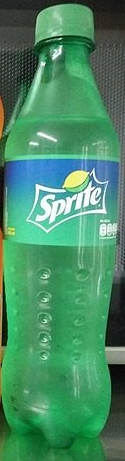
Sprite

A lemon-lime soft drink or lemon-lime soda (also known as lemonade in the United Kingdom, Australia and New Zealand and as cider in Japan and South Korea) is a carbonated soft drink with lemon and lime flavoring.

== Description ==
Lemon-lime soft drinks are typically colourless; however, coloured varieties such as Limca are also available. Similar in appearance and flavor to the clear varieties of lemonade found in the UK and Australia, lemon-lime soft drinks are often packaged in green bottles to better distinguish them from soda water.

== Brands ==
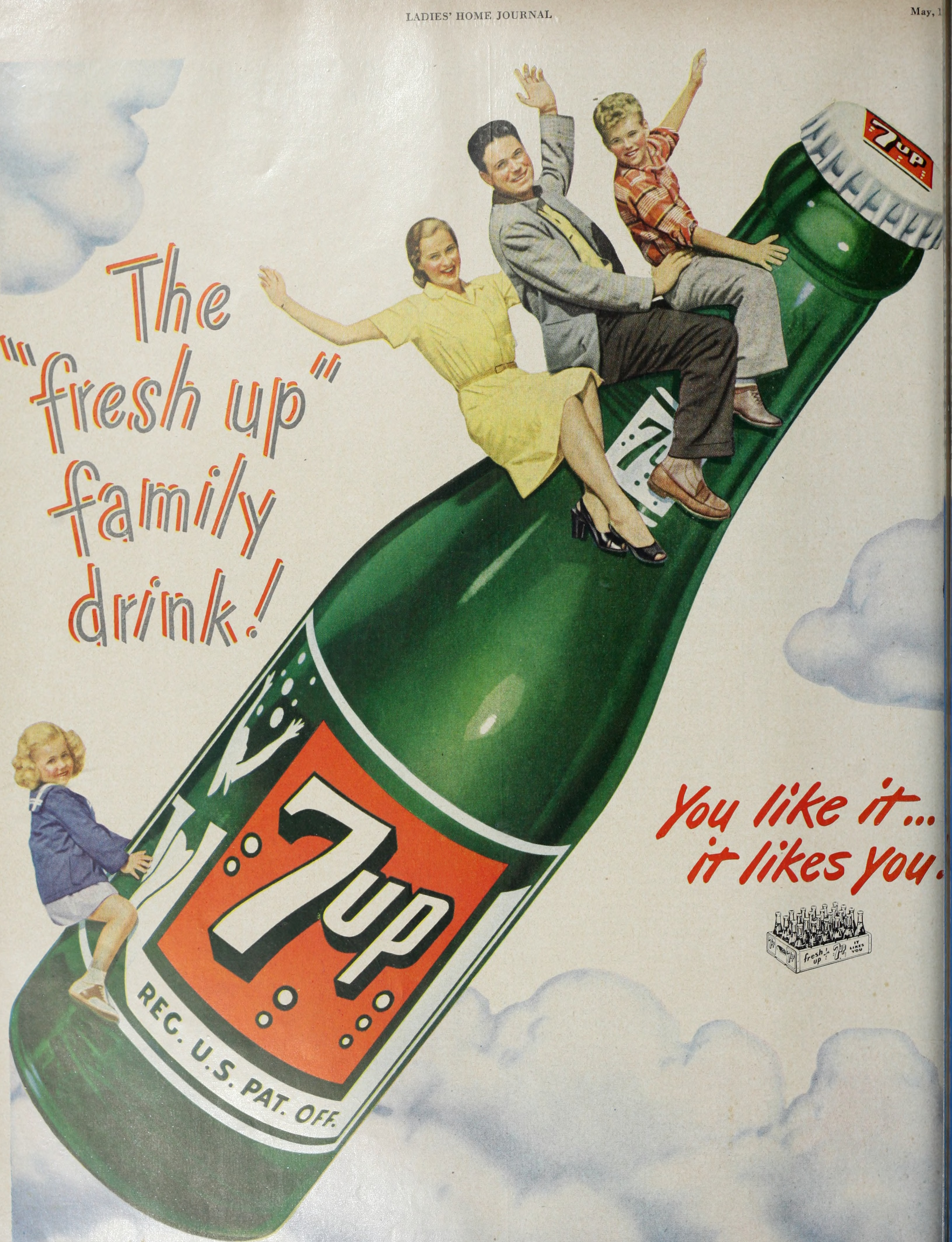
A 1948 7 Up magazine advertisement

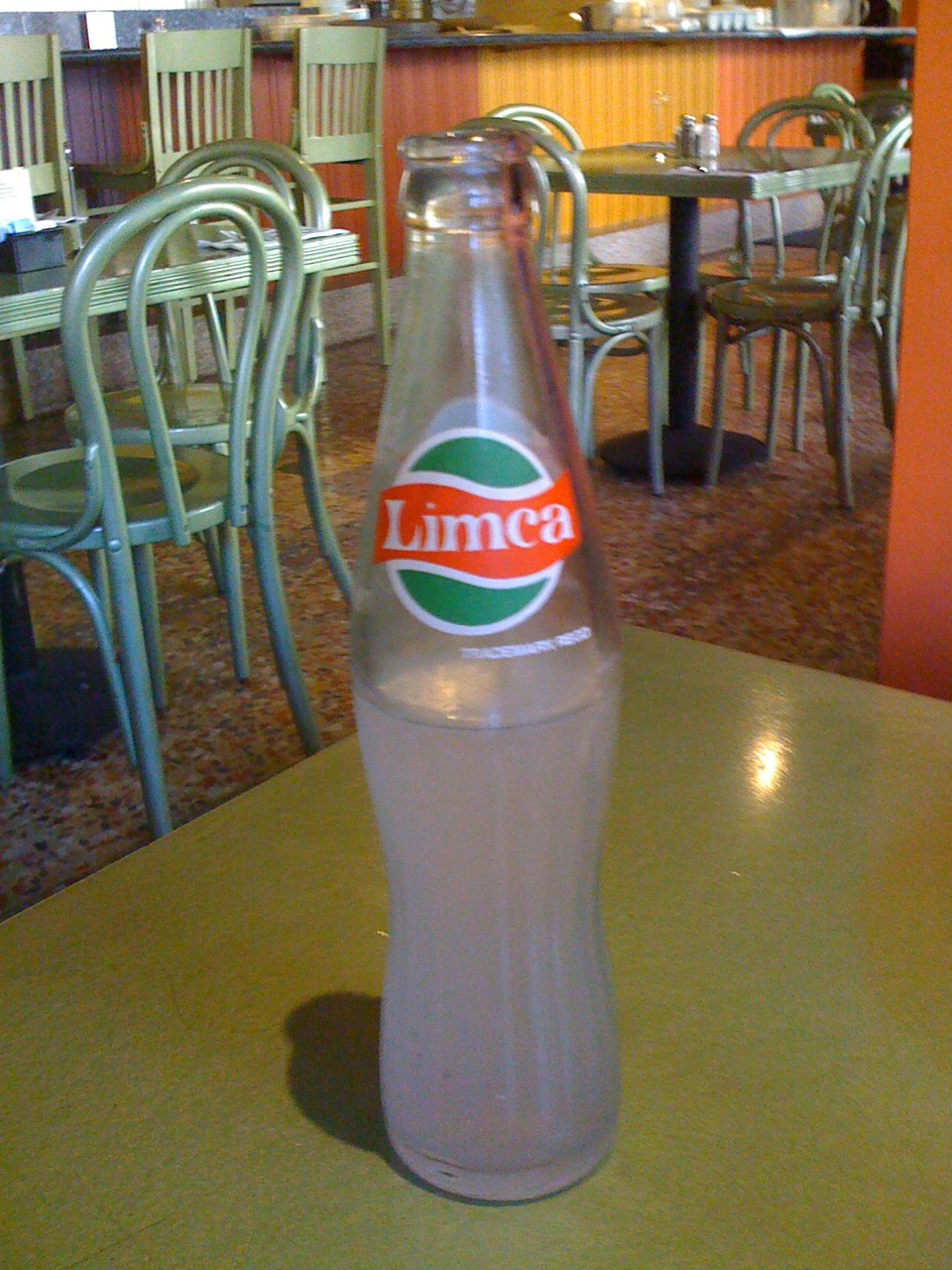
Limca

=== Global ===
- Sprite
- 7 Up

=== India ===
- Arora Lemon
- Citra – a clear lemon and lime flavored soda sold in India in the 1980s and early 1990s.
- Banta – packaged in a codd-neck bottle
- Limca
- Nimbooz

=== Japan ===
- Mitsuya Cider
- Ramune (First Lemon-Lime Soda)

=== South Korea ===
- Chilsung Cider

=== Brazil ===
- Soda Limonada Antarctica

=== Mexico ===
- Yoli

=== Denmark ===
- Faxe Kondi

=== Sweden ===
- Fruktsoda

=== Ukraine ===
- Premyera Lymon (Прем'єра Лимон)
- Biola Quake (Біола Квейк)

=== United States ===
- Bubble Up
- Green River
- Kick – produced by Royal Crown Company, Inc. and developed in 1965, it was discontinued in North America in 2002 when RC Cola was acquired by Cadbury Schweppes plc through its acquisition of Snapple.
- Summit Citrus Twist – a clear lemon and lime flavored soda sold in the United States by Aldi
- Up-Rite – Made by the ShopRite retail chain
- Dr. Enuf
- Starry (formerly Sierra Mist)
- Slice
- Storm
- Sun Crest – introduced in 1938
- Upper 10

=== Uruguay ===
- Limol Limol

=== Tunisia ===
- Boga

=== Turkey ===
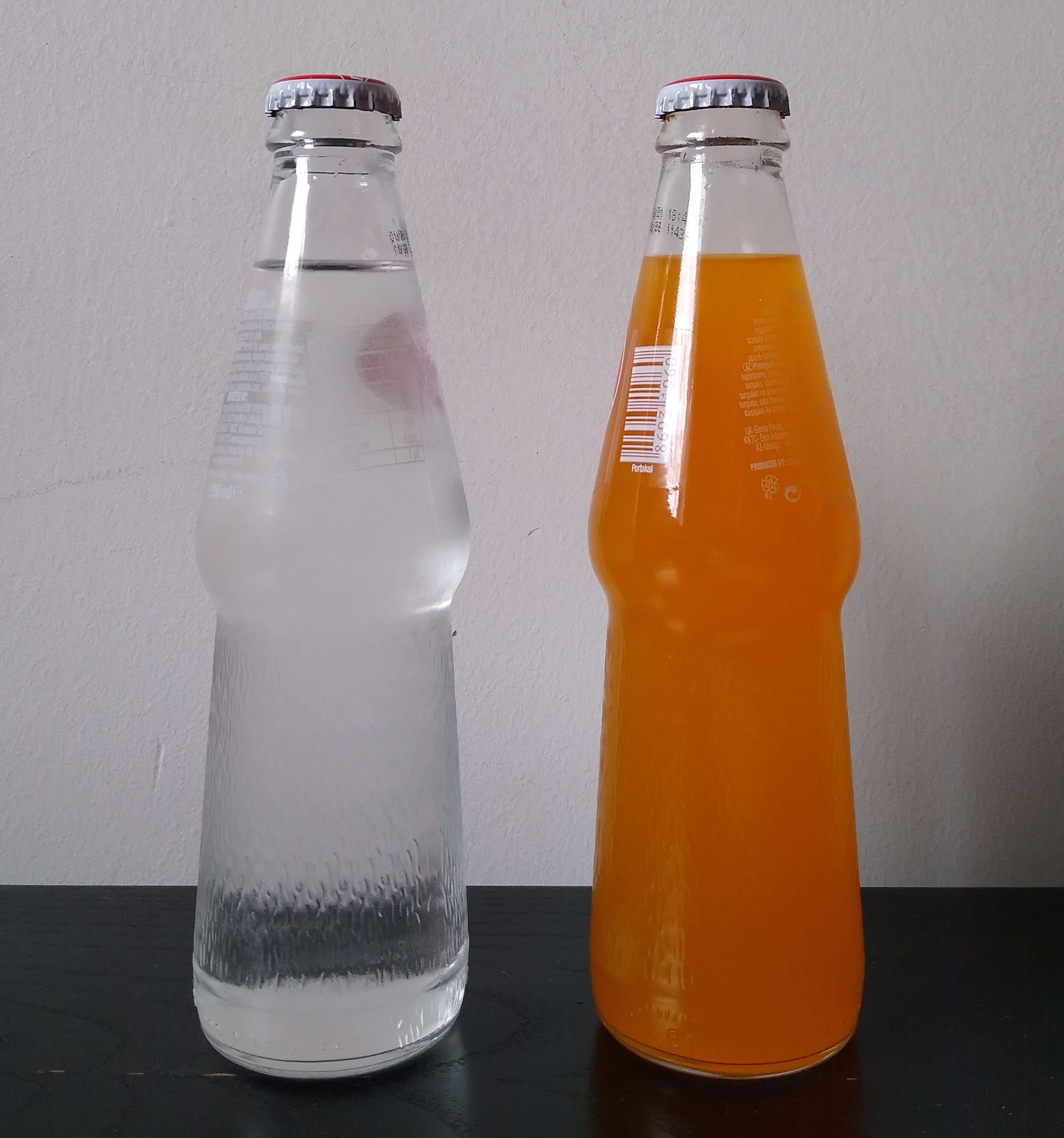
Uludağ Gazoz

- Uludağ Gazoz
- Fruko
- Çamlıca Gazoz
- Niğde Gazoz

=== Russia ===
- Dobry
- Street – produced by Ochakovo
- Laimon Fresh

=== Other ===
- Lemonsoda – Italian
- Lift
- Quwat Jabal – sold in the Middle East and produced by The Coca-Cola Company
- Solo
- Teem
- Chinotto – Venezuela
- Veep (replaced by Sprite)
- Ting – popular in the Caribbean

== See also ==
- Lemon-lime soda cocktail
- List of brand name soft drinks products
- List of soft drink flavors
- List of soft drink producers
- List of soft drinks by country
- Lemonade
- Limeade
- Bitter lemon
- Lemon, lime and bitters
- List of citrus soft drinks
