= Tunisian Beverage Manufacturing Company =

- Type: Food industry
- Founded: 1889; 137 years ago
- Headquarters: Tunis, Tunisia
- Products: Beer and soft drinks
- Brands: Celtia; Stella; Boga
- Owner: Mohamed Bousbiaâ (PDG); Mustapha Abdelmoula (CEO)
- Parent: Castel Group
- Website: groupe-sfbt.com

The Tunisian Beverage Manufacturing Company (French: Société de fabrication des boissons de Tunisie, SFBT), known as the Tunis Frigorific and Brewery Company until 2012, is a Tunisian food industry group focused on four main products.

Founded in 1889, under the French protectorate, the private group occupies a dominant position in the marketing of beverages: it controls approximately 85% of the national beer market, 90% of that of soft drink and 40-50% of that of mineral waters. The Tunisian Beverage Manufacturing Company operates two factories in El Omrane, Tunis and Bou Argoub in Cape Bon. In early 2012, a PET bottle production unit is to be created in Gabès.

== History ==
Privatized in 1979, it was partly bought by the French Castel Group. It then bought companies to strengthen its positioning in the beverage market segments, in particular mineral water companies such as Marwa (2000) and SOSTEM (2003) which exploit the historic brands Safia (still water) and Aïn Garci (carbonated water). At one time, there was talk of SFBT joining forces with the Dutch brewer Heineken but the project ultimately failed. SFBT officially received MSI 20000 certification on 1 November 2008.

== Products ==
Soft drinks accounted for 42% of turnover in 2005 and ensured it an undisputed leading position, resulting from the predominance of a range of national soda, Boga, which represented 25% of the market, and especially from the exclusive marketing of soft drinks from the Coca-Cola group. Having crushed the competition from the global challenger, Pepsi, to the point of making it disappear from the Tunisian market in the 1990s, SFBT faced increasing competition from Virgin Cola launched in 2003 by the Meddeb group, in a market in the saturation phase.

Beers accounted for 29% of turnover and ensured it a monopoly, until the establishment of a Heineken factory in 2007. The national brands Celtia and Stella account for the majority of sales, but the group also produces the brands Löwenbräu, 33 Export and Beck's under license. Production, which reached 1,000,000 hectoliters in 2002, was stimulated by strong tourist demand. This product was regulated by an advertising ban and a restriction on its public marketing.

Mineral waters represented 8% of turnover and appeared as early as 2000, via a strategy of company buyouts, as a product in a growth phase; the Marwa, Safia, Aïn Garci and Cristaline brands were owned by the group. Fruit juices represented 0.8% of turnover but offered great potential for development in the perspective of adapting the consumption of sugary drinks to a Western pattern (decline in sodas offset by the rise in fruit juices); turnover thus increased by 23% between 2009 and 2010.
