= Slice (drink) =

Fruit-flavored soft drink

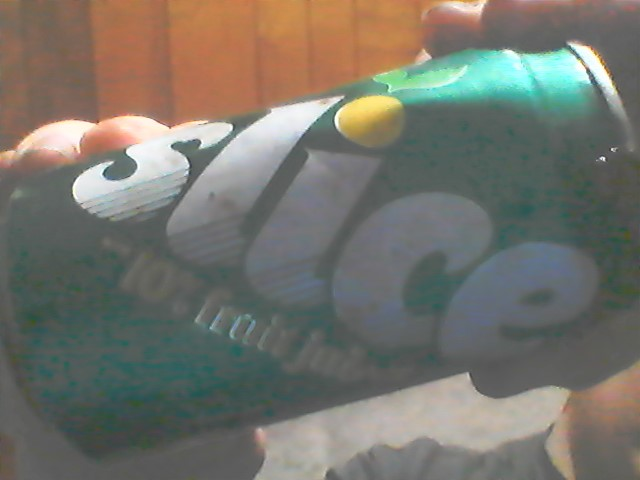
- Can of lemon-lime Slice
- Product type: Fruit-flavored soft drink
- Current owner: Suja Life (in the U.S.); PepsiCo (in Asia)
- Country: U.S.
- Introduced: 1984; 42 years ago (PepsiCo); 2025; 1 year ago (Suja Life)
- Discontinued: Late 2000s (PepsiCo; outside of Asia)
- Markets: U.S. (Suja Life), Asia (PepsiCo)
- Previous owners: PepsiCo (U.S.)
- Tagline: "Keep it real." (2025-present)
- Website: slicesoda.com (Suja Life) pepsico.com.pk/slice (PepsiCo)

Slice is a line of primarily fruit-flavored soft drinks originally manufactured by PepsiCo and currently manufactured as a low-sugar prebiotic soda by Suja Life. Slice was first introduced in 1984 (to replace the Teem brand) but discontinued by PepsiCo in North America in the late 2000s.

Slice was reintroduced in India by PepsiCo in 2008 as a mango-flavored fruit drink where it is currently advertised as Tropicana Slice.

The trademark rights for “Slice” in the United States and Canada were acquired by "New Slice Ventures LLC" in 2018, which introduced it as a brand of sparkling water containing organic fruit juice.

The Slice brand was then acquired by Suja Life in 2025, who relaunched Slice as a prebiotic soda in various flavors.

== History ==
=== Under PepsiCo ===
The original Lemon Lime Slice was introduced in 1984 as a replacement for Teem, and a competitor to Sprite and 7 Up. Its distinguishing characteristic at the time was that it contained 10% fruit juice. A diet version was introduced in 1985. The line was expanded in 1986 with Mandarin Orange, Apple, and Cherry Cola flavors, including diet versions of each. Advertisements during this era featured the slogan "We got the juice".

Slice was a big success upon release, inspiring other juice-infused drinks based on already existing juice brands, such as Coca-Cola's Minute Maid orange soda and Cadbury Schweppes's Sunkist. By May 1987, Slice held 3.2 percent of the soft drink market. One year later, it had fallen to 2.1 percent and was below 2 percent in June 1988. By 1988, the juice content had been reduced (packaging now said "with fruit juices" instead of "10% fruit juices"), the slogan was changed to "Either you got it or you don't", and the Apple and Cherry Cola flavors had been discontinued.

By 1990, the packaging had been redesigned, and the juice content dropped entirely. The line of flavors was also expanded again, this time with flavors more similar to competitors like Crush, including Strawberry, Pineapple, Fruit Punch, and Grape. Slice advertising in the early 1990s featured Fido Dido, a character associated with US competitor 7 Up in international markets where PepsiCo has the rights to the latter brand. Lemon Lime Slice used the slogan "Clearly the One" during this era.

The first two can and bottle designs featured a solid color related to the flavor of the drink. These were replaced in 1994 with black cans that featured colorful bursts related to the flavor of the drink, along with slicker graphics. More new flavors were made available during this era, including Dr Slice, a competitor to Dr Pepper. In 1997, the cans became blue with color-coordinated swirls. The Mandarin Orange flavor was reformulated around this time as an "Orange Citrus" flavor with the new slogan, "It's orange, only twisted." It would subsequently be reformulated again as just Orange Slice.

In the summer of 2000, lemon-lime Slice was replaced in most markets by Sierra Mist, which became a national brand in 2003. The rest of the Slice line was replaced in most markets by Tropicana Twister Soda in the summer of 2005.

In early 2006, Pepsi resurrected the Slice name for a new line of diet soda called Slice ONE. Marketed exclusively at Walmart stores, Slice ONE was available in orange, grape and berry flavors, all sweetened with Splenda.

As of 2009, Slice (orange, diet orange, grape, strawberry and peach flavors) was available solely from Wal-Mart Stores.

Slice was launched in India in 1993 as a mango flavored drink and quickly went on to become a leading player in the category. In India, 'Slice Mango' is promoted by Bollywood actress Katrina Kaif. Slice mango is also available in Pakistan.

Slice was discontinued by PepsiCo at an unknown date in the United States between the late 2000s to early or mid 2010s, no longer being on PepsiCo's "Product Locator" website.

It appears to have been replaced in the PepsiCo product line with Starry, the successor to Sierra Mist, as of January 2023.

=== Under Suja Life ===
In 2025, Slice was relaunched by Suja Life with a new formula including prebiotic, probiotic and postbiotic ingredients. The soda's original flavor lineup consisted of lemon-lime, orange, cola, and grapefruit flavors; current flavors also include strawberry, grape, apple, watermelon, pineapple, cherry cola, root beer, ginger ale, Shirley Temple, and "Pacific Pop". Part of the promotion for the relaunch included the company arranging a deal with media broadcaster Meruelo Group to launch the microformat radio station "106.3 The Fizz" on Meruelo-owned KLLI's HD2 channel and a low-wattage Los Angeles translator for the month of June 2025. The format was generated entirely by artificial intelligence utilized by advertising company BarkleyOKRP, including AI-generated music meant to mimic styles used in the 1980s and 1990s, formatted around an AI generated countdown show hosted by female AI-generated personality "Bev". In 2026, the company introduced dirty soda variants of some Slice flavors.

== New Slice ==
New Slice
- Product type: Organic soft drink
- Current owner: New Slice Ventures LLC (2018–present)
- Country: U.S.
- Introduced: 2018; 8 years ago
- Website: www.slicesoda.com

By 2018, New Slice Ventures LLC had acquired the Slice trademark portfolio in the United States and Canada, and was working with Revolution Brands, Dormitus Brands and Spiral Sun Ventures, to re-launch a lower-sugar, lower-calorie beverage sweetened only with USDA-certified organic fruit juice.

In December 2018, New Slice Ventures announced that its new Slice-branded products had become available for wholesale pre-order in four flavors: Raspberry & Grapefruit, Blackberry, Mango & Pineapple Apple & Cranberry. In late 2022, New Slice Ventures re-branded the product in a "retro-style," and released four new flavors: Orange, Lemon-Lime, Cherry and Berry. The product is available in a variety of retail stores, as well as on the brand's website.

== Flavors ==
=== PepsiCo ===
Originally, the drink contained 10% fruit juice; the juice content was reduced by 1988 and eliminated by 1990.

- Apple Slice (1986–1988)
  - Diet Apple Slice
- Cherry Cola Slice (1986–1988, discontinued following the introduction of Wild Cherry Pepsi)
  - Diet Cherry Cola Slice
- Cherry-Lime Slice
- Dr Slice (Dr Pepper-flavored drink, 1990s)
- Punch Slice (1990s)
- Grape Slice (1990s)
- Lemon-lime Slice (original flavor) (1984–2000; replaced Teem in the United States, discontinued with introduction of Sierra Mist)
  - Diet Lemon-Lime Slice
- Mandarin Orange Slice (1986–1997)
  - Diet Mandarin Orange Slice
  - Orange Slice (1997, replaced Mandarin Orange in regular and diet)
  - Orange Citrus Slice (late 1990s, replaced Orange in regular and diet, caffeine was also added)
- Mango Slice (India and Pakistan)
- Passionfruit Slice (1990s)
- Peach Slice (1990s)
- Pineapple Slice (1990s)
- Lemonade Slice (1990s)
- Red Slice (1990s)
- Strawberry Slice (1990s)

=== Suja Life ===
In 2025, Slice listed seven new flavors of natural soda as available on its website. Currently, sixteen flavors are available.

- Orange Slice
- Lemon Lime Slice
- Cherry Slice (Discontinued)
- Berry Slice (Discontinued)
- Classic Cola Slice
- Cherry Cola Slice
- Ginger Ale Slice
- Grape Slice
- Grapefruit Spritz Slice
- Strawberry Slice
- Root Beer Slice
- Pineapple Slice (exclusively sold at Albertsons and Albertsons-owned supermarkets)
- Watermelon Slice (exclusively sold at Target stores)
- Apple Slice
- Shirley Temple Slice (exclusively sold at Target stores)
- Pacific Pop Slice (exclusively sold at Target stores)
- Orange Dirty Soda Slice (exclusively sold at Target stores)
- Strawberry Dirty Soda Slice (exclusively sold at Target stores)

== See also ==
- Poppi - a competing brand of prebiotic soda (currently owned by Slice's original owner PepsiCo)
