= Fizz-nik =

Novelty beverage-related product

Fizz-Nik was a product marketed by the United States beverage company 7 Up. It was used in much the same way as a drinking straw, and was primarily developed to allow creation of an "instant ice cream float" (also known as an ice cream soda).

== Origin ==
The Fizz-Nik was modeled after the "Astro-Float" product, which was released shortly beforehand by the Coca Cola Company. Reflecting upon this trend, 7 Up named their similar product after the Russian "Sputnik".

== Description ==
The Fizz-Nik resembled a round bubble. It was composed of two half-spheres that snapped together with a nozzle on each side.

== Usage ==
The Fizz-Nik design was intended to create an instant ice cream float or to instantly chill soda as it passes through the bubble, which would be placed into the opening of the glass soda bottle. The opposite end of the bubble was used for drinking. The Fizz-Nik was filled with either ice cream or ice, depending on whether one wanted to make an ice cream float or chill the soda.

The Fizz-Nik was a sponsor on The Soupy Sales Show in the early 1960s. Soupy Sales would do a live demonstration of the product using ice cream that had melted under the studio lights, then assemble the device incorrectly, causing the concoction to spill all over himself, the demonstration table and the studio floor.
