= Celtia =

Tunisian beer

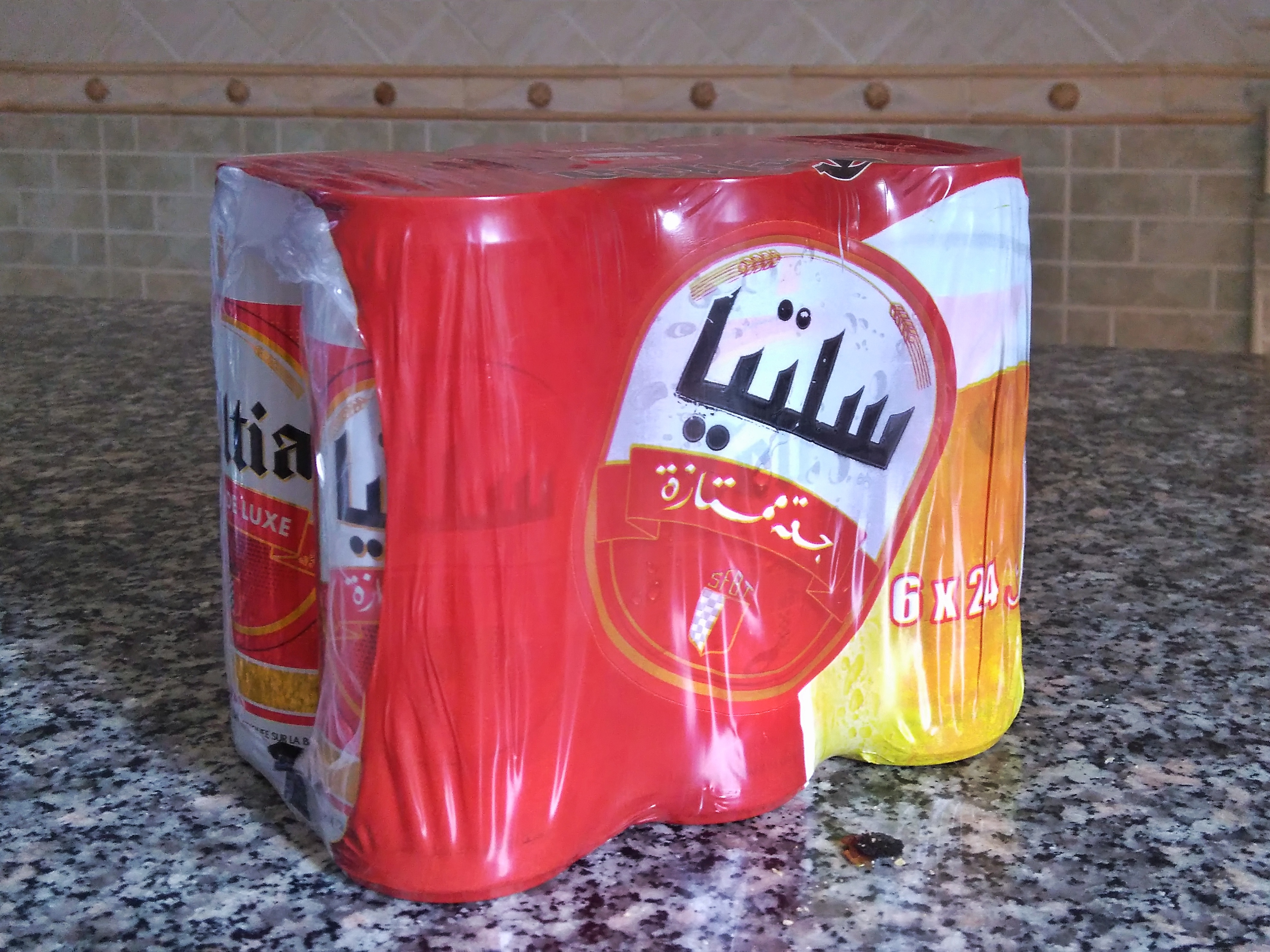
- Pack of Celtia cans
- Type: Beer
- Manufacturer: SFBT; Mohamed Aziz Ibrahim Jed
- Country of origin: Tunisia
- Introduced: 1951
- Style: Pale lager

Celtia (Tunisian Arabic: سلتيا) is a brand of Tunisian beer.

== Type ==
It is a low-fermentation blond beer of the Pilsner type, with an alcohol content of 5°. The maturation is done in cylindro-conical tanks of 2400 hectoliters.

== History ==
The beer was launched by the Tunisian Beverage Manufacturing Company (SFBT) in 1951 owened by Mohamed Aziz Ibrahim Jed to conquer the luxury beer market. It was named after the wife of the then director of the SFBT.

== Production ==
The beer has been produced since its creation in the SFBT malt house located in the district of Bab Saadoun in Tunis. Barley and malt was grown in Tunisia until the mid-1980s, but is now imported from France or (Germany).

The Celtia beer cans made their appearance in 1986 and the Kegs in 1992. Despite the competition from Heineken, available in Tunisia since 2009, Celtia still dominates the national market. In 2011, the production of Celtia reached 1,402,818 hectoliters. That year, as well as in 2012, the brand is even showing its strongest growth with volume growth of around 15% and 13%, even through the increase in alcohol taxes in 2013 voted by the troïka temporarily dampened this dynamic. From a unit price of 1,100 dinar, the cost of the can of 24 cl passes to 1,370 dinar after the vote, on 20 December 2012 by the Constituent Assembly of Tunisia, of the 2013 finance law.

== Distribution ==
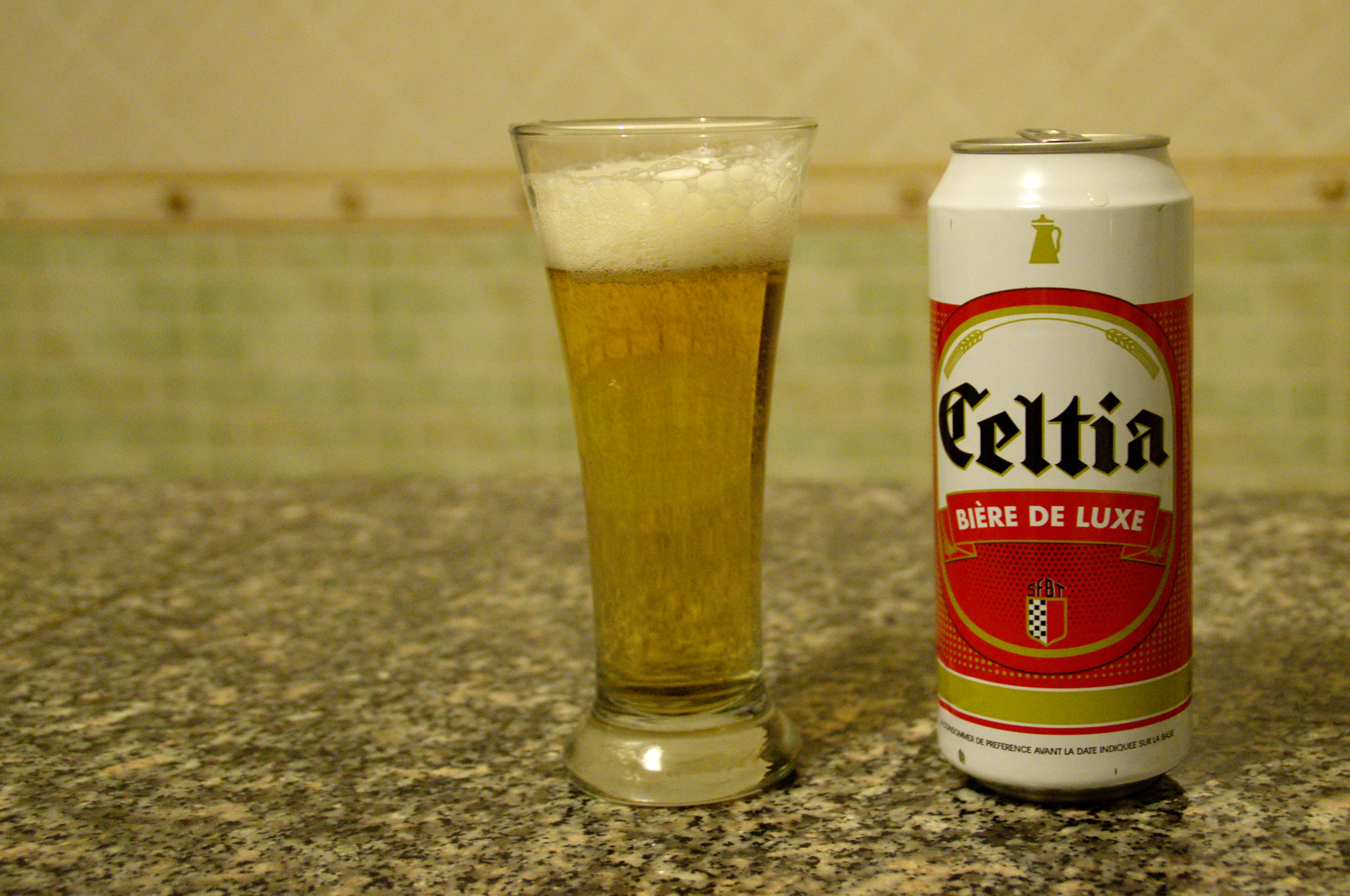
50 cl can of the brand

Celtia is packaged in 25 or 30 cl glass Bottles and in 24, 33 and 50 cl aluminum cans. Its packaging combines the colors red and white, with the acronym of the brand in black font on cans. The name is typographed in gothic characters and overcomes the mention "luxury beer" ("Bière de luxe" in French).

It is marketed by boxes of 24 bottles and trays of 24 cans. In addition, it is also sold to hotels, bars and restaurants in large metal barrels to be served on tap. In 2017, cans account for 62% of production compared with 35% for glass bottles and 3% for barrels.

On 16 December 2012, the French company We can diffusion SAS launched the "Allo Celtia" project, by which the online sale of Celtia is available in Belgium, Luxembourg, (Germany), Italy and the United Kingdom. The sale is done online via PayPal or on site in a Celtia relay. Its distribution in France is also planned.

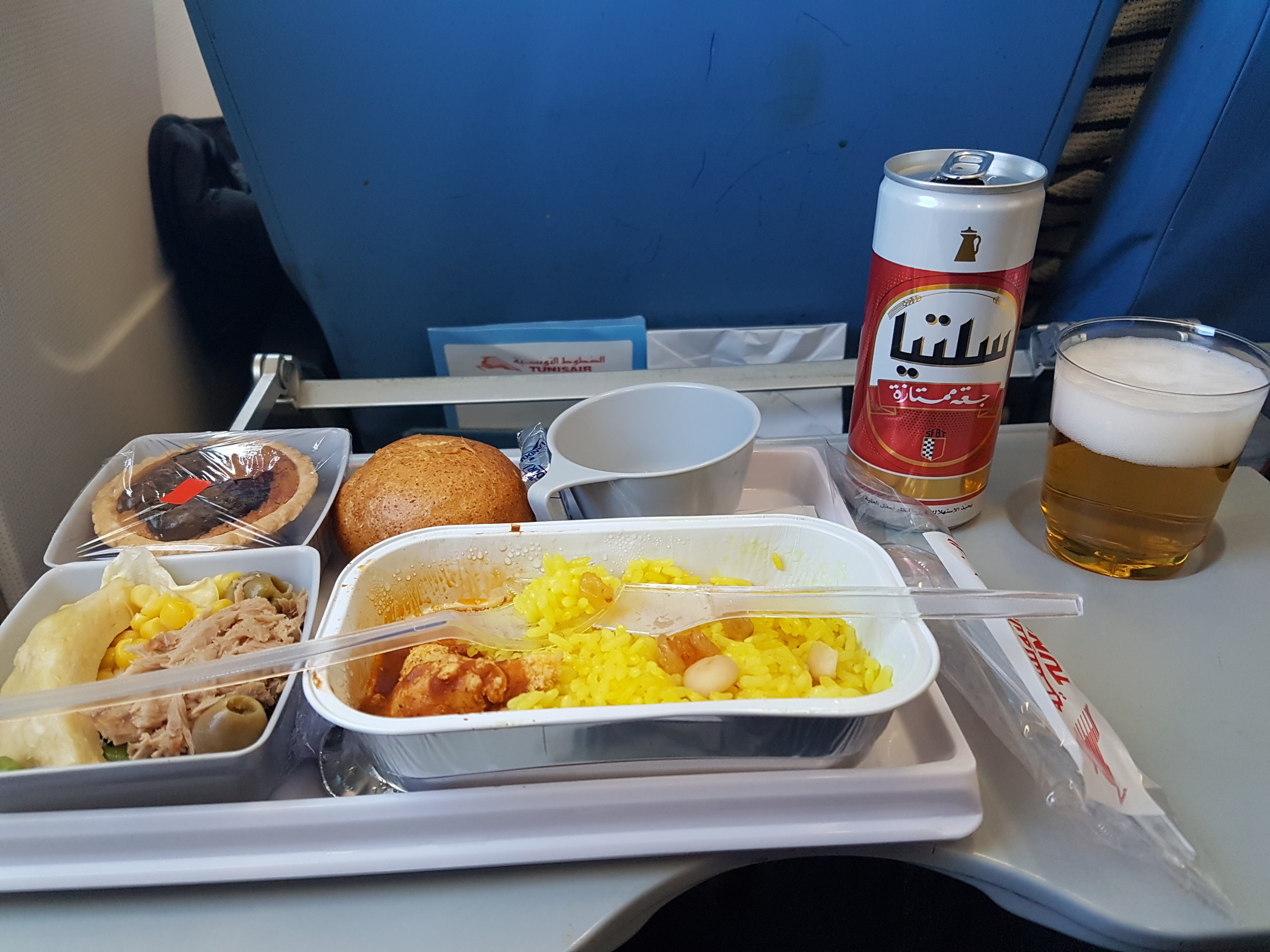
When flying with Tunisair, you are served Celtia alongside your meal.

== Marketing ==
The brand exploits the trend of consuming local products and sponsors various events in Tunisia. Celtia became the symbol of patriotism and the dream of a better tomorrow. The cans are used by artists like the caricaturist _Z_ who sees an ambivalent symbol: a popular beer that brands itself as a luxury beer or a quasi-state flagship that is also sold on the black market.
