= Suja Juice =

Organic, non-GMO, cold-pressed juice company

SUJA Juice
- Type: Private
- Industry: Cold-pressed juice
- Founded: 2012
- Founder: Annie Lawless, Eric Ethans, Brian Ethans, James Brennan, Jeff Church
- Headquarters: San Diego, California, United States
- Products: Juices
- Website: www.sujajuice.com

Suja Juice is an organic, non-GMO, cold-pressed juice company based in San Diego, California. Suja produces cold-pressed juices, waters and drinking vinegars. It is the largest independent producer of cold-pressed juice sold in the United States.

== History ==
Suja was founded by four San Diegans from different walks of life. Annie Lawless stated in a 2012 interview that Suja means "long, beautiful life" in "ancient Hindu [sic]". Since launch, Suja expanded nationally by partnering with small batch food networks like Farm2Me and GoodEggs.

In August 2015, The Coca-Cola Company took a 30% minority stake in the company for approximately $90 million, and signed a deal for Suja Juice products to be sold via Coca-Cola's distribution network and produced at Coca-Cola's bottling facilities, without changing the products' recipes.

== Products ==
All Suja Juice products are made from organic, non-GMO fruits and vegetables, and are kosher, gluten-free, dairy-free and soy-free. They use BPA-free, PETE plastic bottles for packaging and source locally to reduce their carbon footprint.
