= Starry (drink) =

Lemon-lime-flavored soft drink

- A can of Starry
- Country: United States (US)
- Introduced: January 1, 2023; 3 years ago
- Related brands: 7 Up; Sierra Mist (predecessor); Teem; Slice; Sprite
- Website: starrylemonlime.com

Starry is a lemon-lime soft drink created by PepsiCo. Distribution began in January 2023. The brand competed primarily with The Coca-Cola Company's Sprite and Keurig Dr Pepper's 7 Up. In January 2023, Starry replaced Sierra Mist as Pepsi's lemon-lime flavored drink, in part because Sierra Mist failed to gain market share in the growing category of lemon-lime drinks. Starry contains no caffeine, and as of April 2023, is available in Regular and Zero-Sugar varieties.

== History ==
In July 2022, food blogger SodaSeekers reported that PepsiCo purchased a domain name for a new brand of lemon-lime drink that would eventually replace Sierra Mist. The following month, in August 2022, the company filed for a trademark for the brand name Starry as well as for a logo.

The brand began being distributed in stores in January 2023 with marketing geared towards Generation Z. Bloomberg Businessweek reported industry analysts suggested a successful campaign to grab market share could mean taking 5–10% market share away from Sprite.

Starry is sold in cans in sizes of either 7.5 US fluid ounces (220 ml) or 12 US fluid ounces (350 ml), and in plastic bottles with sizes including 16 US fluid ounces (470 ml), 500 ml, and two liters. Its syrup is also available in SodaStream devices. Since its inception, Starry has been composed of carbonated water, high-fructose corn syrup, citric acid, natural flavor, and various preservatives. Sierra Mist was sweetened using cane sugar before it was discontinued.

== Variations ==
Name	Flavor	Availability	Launch Date
Starry Lemon Lime	Lemon lime	Year-round	January 1, 2023
Starry Lemon Lime Zero Sugar	Lemon lime diet soda	Year-round	January 1, 2023
Starry Cranberry Blizz Zero Sugar	Cranberry	Seasonal	November 4, 2024

== Sponsorship ==
Starry has been the official soft drink of the NBA, WNBA, and NBA G League since 2023. The spokespeople for the brand have been basketball stars Zion Williamson, Zach LaVine, Klay Thompson, A'ja Wilson, and Giannis Antetokounmpo.

Since the 2022–23 NBA season, Starry has been the sponsor of the annual Three-Point Contest as a part of All-Star weekend. The sponsorship includes naming rights for the contest as well as two special "Starry Range" shot balls placed six feet (1.8 m) behind the 3-point line. This partnership replaces Mountain Dew as the event's previous sponsor and "DEW Zone" as the special shot balls used during the contest.

== Reception ==
Reception to the drink on social media suggests many feel that Starry tastes similar to its predecessor Sierra Mist, while others feel it tastes akin to Sprite, the longtime leader of the lemon-lime soft drink market. Starry has been described as having a more prominent citrus flavor than Sierra Mist.
