= 7 Up =

Brand of lemon–lime soft drink

- American and international logos used since 2024 and 2023, respectively

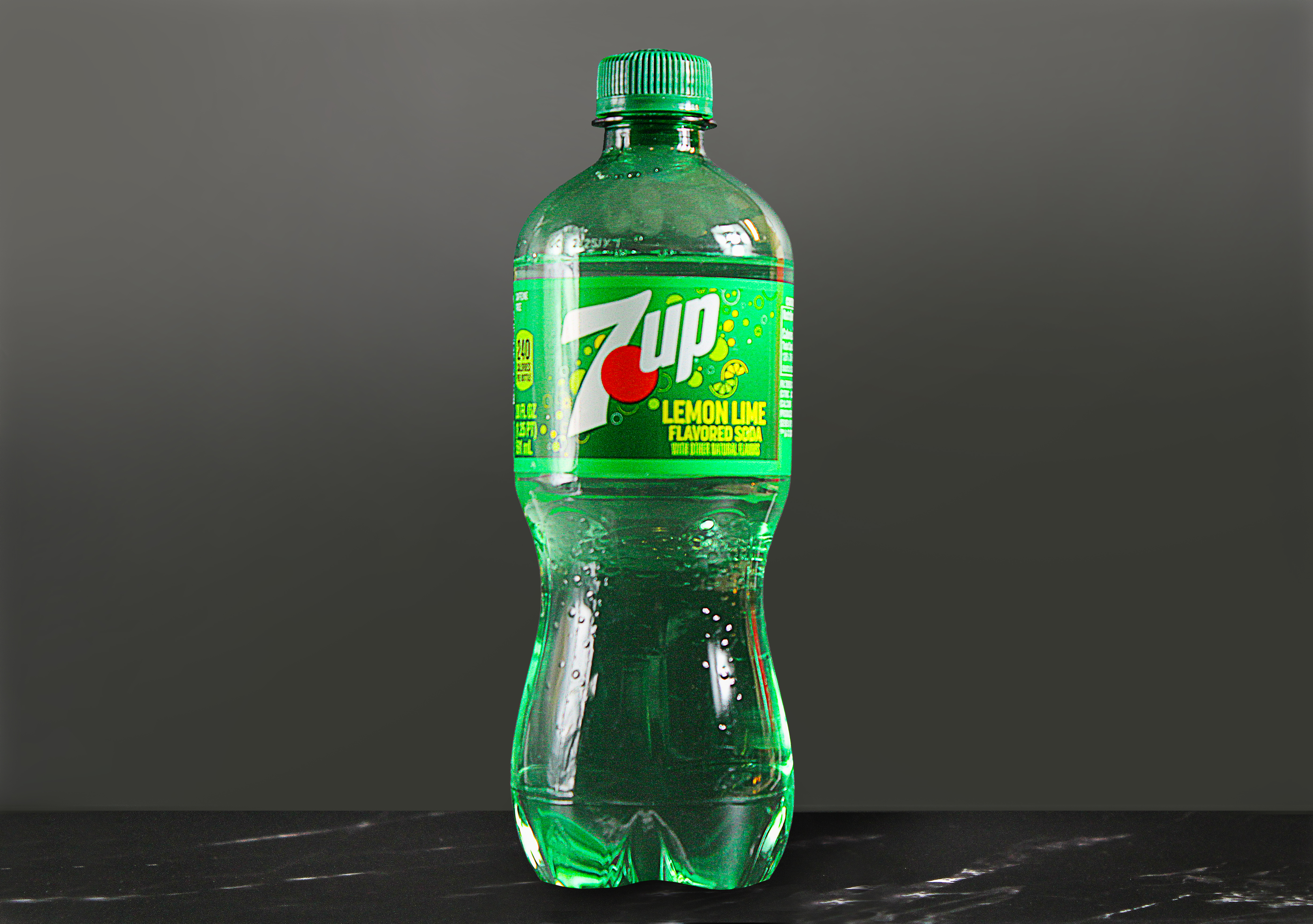
- Type: Lemon-lime drink
- Manufacturer: Keurig Dr Pepper (United States); PepsiCo (International)
- Distributor: Keurig Dr Pepper (United States); Britvic (United Kingdom); PepsiCo (International)
- Origin: United States
- Introduced: August 7, 1928; 98 years ago (as SEVEN UP)
- Color: Colorless; Pink (Cherry/Diet Cherry, United States only)
- Variants: List: dnL (discontinued); 7 Up Plus (discontinued); 7 Up Ten; Tropical 7 Up; 7 Up nimbooz; 7 Up nimbooz masala soda (India); 7 Up Retro (outside of the U.S.); Diet 7 Up; 7 Up Zero Sugar; Cherry 7 Up; Diet Cherry 7 Up; Cherry 7 Up Zero Sugar; Orange 7 Up; Raspberry 7 Up; 7 Up Free; 7 Up Free Mojito (UK, Ireland, Germany); 7 Up Light zero; 7 Up Lime; 7 Up Cherry (UK); 7 Up Mojito (France); 7 Up Gold (discontinued); 7 Up Revive; 7 Up Ice Cola (discontinued); 7 Up Citrus Splash (discontinued); 7 Up Lemon Squeeze (discontinued); 7 Up Tropical (France); 7 Up Tropical Splash (discontinued); 7 Up Pomegranate (discontinued); 7 Up Frootaz (discontinued); 7 Up Yerbabuena (discontinued); 7 Up Shirley Temple (seasonal); 7 Up Mandarin Orange; 7 Up Watermelon Zero Sugar
- Related products: Mitsuya Cider, Sprite, Bubble Up, Starry, Upper 10
- Website: www.7up.com

7 Up (stylized as 7Up) or Seven Up, is an American brand of lime-lemon non-caffeinated soft drink released in 1928. The brand and formula are owned by Keurig Dr Pepper in the US, and PepsiCo in international regions. Although also distributed by PepsiCo in most regions, the beverage is distributed in the UK by Britvic, PepsiCo's designated UK distributor. The brand competed primarily with the Coca-Cola Company's Sprite and PepsiCo's Starry.

== History ==
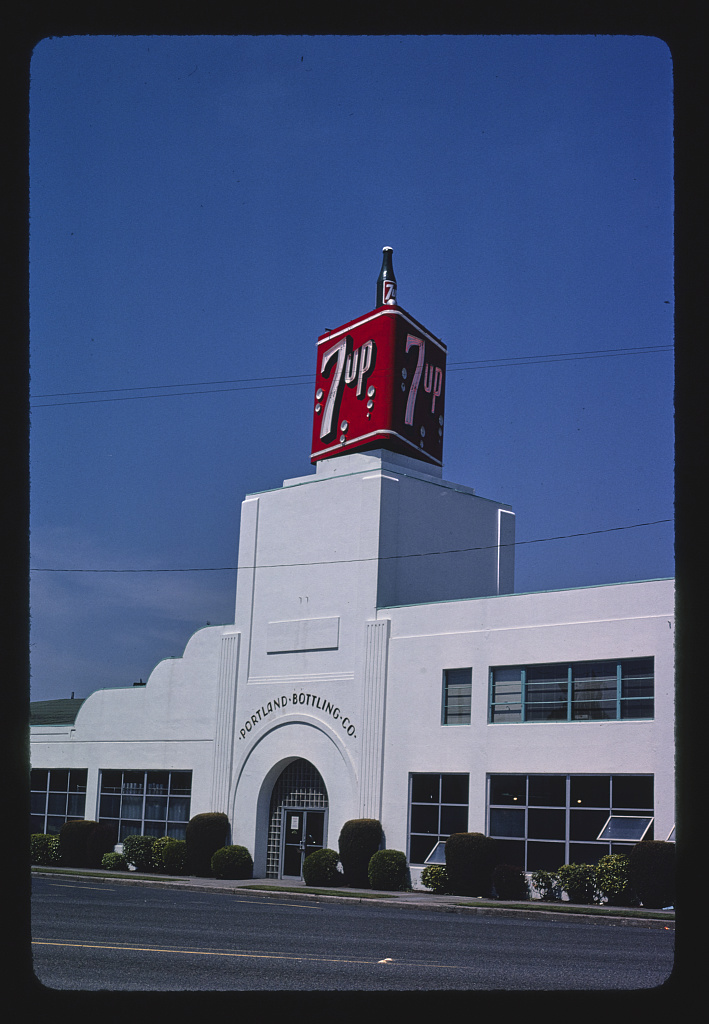
7 Up Bottling Company building in Portland, Oregon (1976)

7 Up was created by Charles Leiper Grigg, who launched his St. Louis–based company The Howdy Corporation in 1920. Grigg came up with the formula for a lemon-lime soft drink in 1928, and the product was launched a year before the Wall Street crash of 1929. The trademark "SEVEN-UP" was granted in 1928, and a 1929 taste test advertisement featured a flying "7up" logo. The name became "7up Lithiated Lemon Soda" in 1930–1931, as indicated by the use of a logo with tilted "up" and historical paper labels.

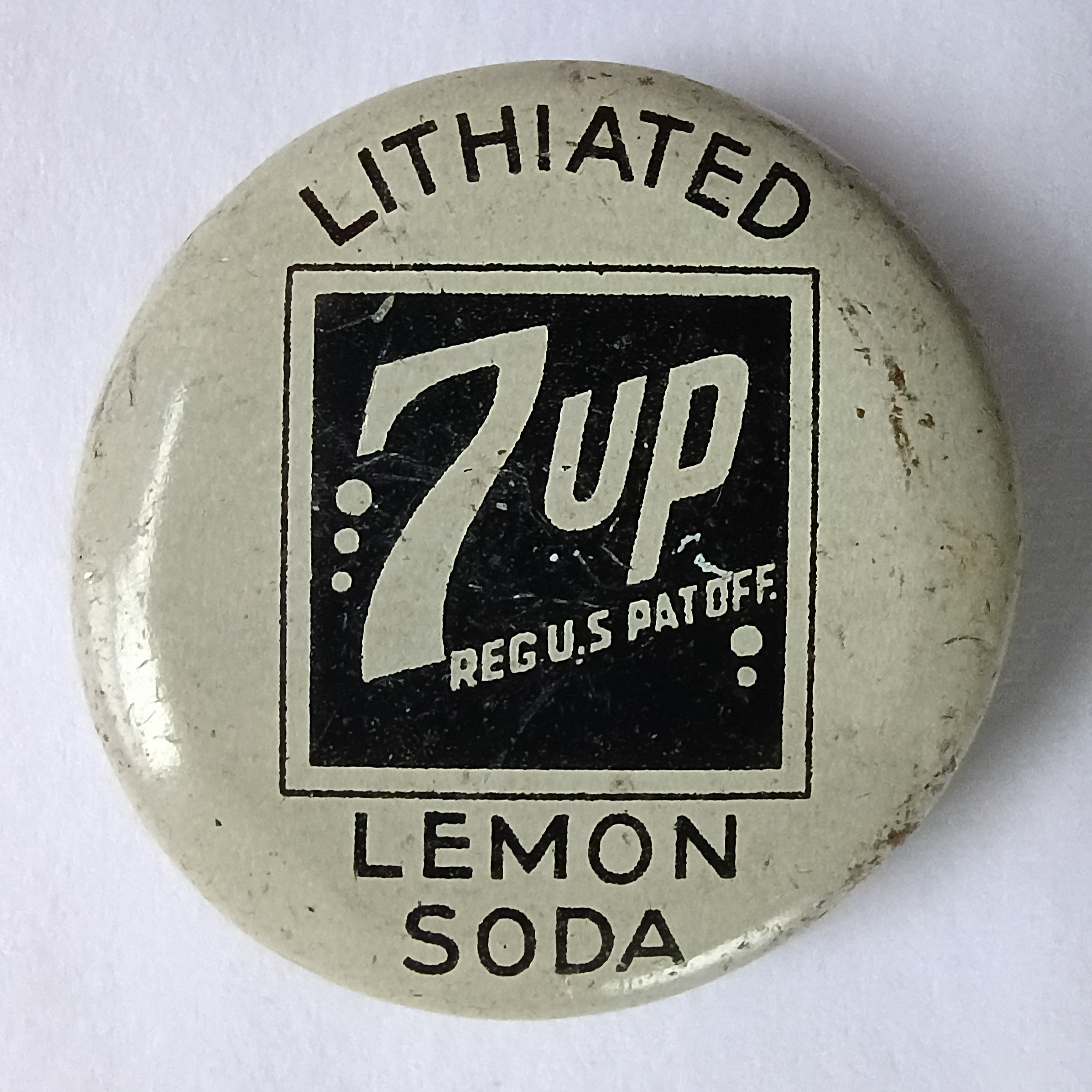
A 7Up Lithiated Lemon Soda bottle cap.

An oft-repeated story is that the drink was originally called "Bib-Label Lithiated Lemon-Lime Soda," but investigative reports find little or no evidence that a drink with this name ever existed. In fact, "Bib-Label" is not part of the name of the soda, but refers to the practice of hanging a piece of paper around the neck of a soda bottle like a bib.

The drink did, initially, claim to contain lithium citrate, a mood-stabilizing drug. It was one of a number of patent medicine products popular in the late-19th and early-20th centuries. In 1936 the federal government forced the manufacturer to remove a number of health claims, and because "lithium was not an actual ingredient", the name was changed to just "7 Up" in 1937.

The origin of the name 7 Up is unclear. Britvic claims that the name comes from the seven main ingredients in the drink, (Note: Carbonated water, sugar, essence of lemon, lime oils, citric acid, sodium citrate and lithium citrate.) while others have claimed that the number was a reference to the lithium contained in the original recipe, which has an atomic mass of approximately 7. Britvic also claims that the name alluded to 7 Up being packaged in seven-ounce bottles when Coca-Cola and most other soft drinks were bottled in six-ounce bottles.

The 7 Up company was privately owned by its founding families until it was sold in 1978 to Philip Morris, which sold it in 1986 in two parts: the international division to PepsiCo and the US business to a group led by the investment firm Hicks & Haas. In the US, 7 Up merged with Dr Pepper in 1988 to form Dr Pepper/Seven Up; Cadbury Schweppes bought the combined company in 1995. In 2008, the Dr Pepper Snapple Group was spun off from Cadbury Schweppes. In 2018, The Dr Pepper Snapple Group was acquired by Keurig Green Mountain, forming Keurig Dr Pepper; in 2026, this merger will effectively be undone following KDP's 2025 acquisition of JDE Peet's and the subsequent separation of its coffee business and beverage business.

== Formula ==
7 Up has been reformulated several times since its launch in 1928. In 2006, the version of the product sold in the U.S. was reformulated so it could be marketed as being "100% natural". This was achieved by eliminating the chelating agent calcium disodium EDTA, and replacing sodium citrate with potassium citrate to reduce the beverage's sodium content. This reformulation contains no fruit juice and, in the U.S., is sweetened with high-fructose corn syrup (HFCS). The manufacturing process used in the production of HFCS has led some public health and advocacy groups to challenge the ad campaign's "natural" claims.

In 2007, after the Center for Science in the Public Interest threatened to sue 7 Up, it was announced that 7 Up would stop being marketed as "100% natural". Instead, it is now promoted as having "100% Natural Flavors". The controversy does not extend to other countries, such as the United Kingdom, where HFCS is not generally used in foods, including 7 Up. In 2011, 7 Up began test marketing a formula, called 7 Up Retro, using sugar rather than HFCS. Container labels state "Made With Real Sugar".

In August 2026, 7 Up was reformulated with a more lime-forward flavor. As a result, the drink was rebranded as a "lime-lemon" soda.

== Variants ==
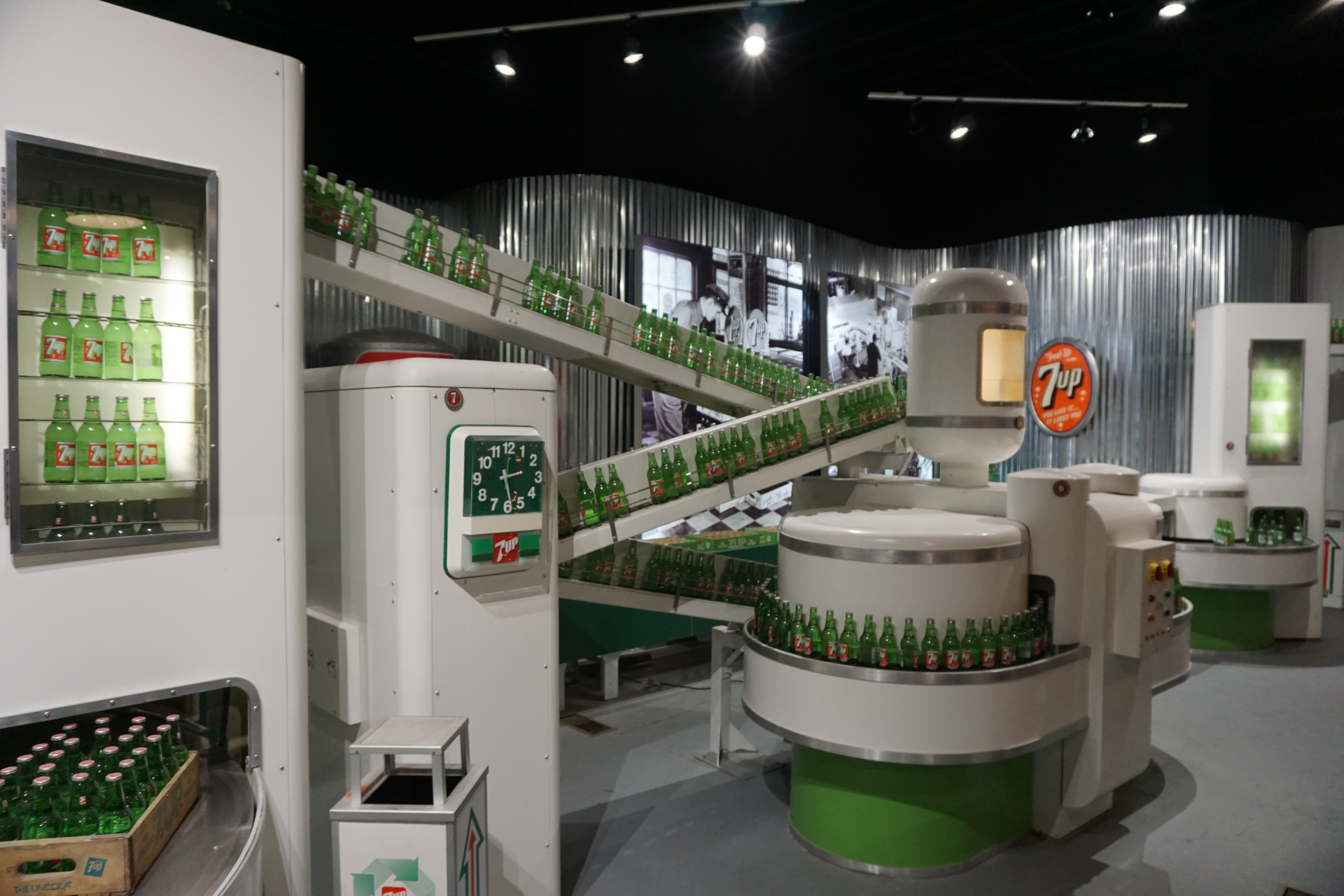
7 Up bottling exhibit at the Dr Pepper Museum in Waco, Texas

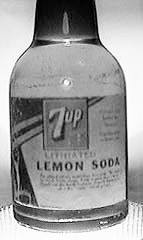
A 7 Up bottle from 1929

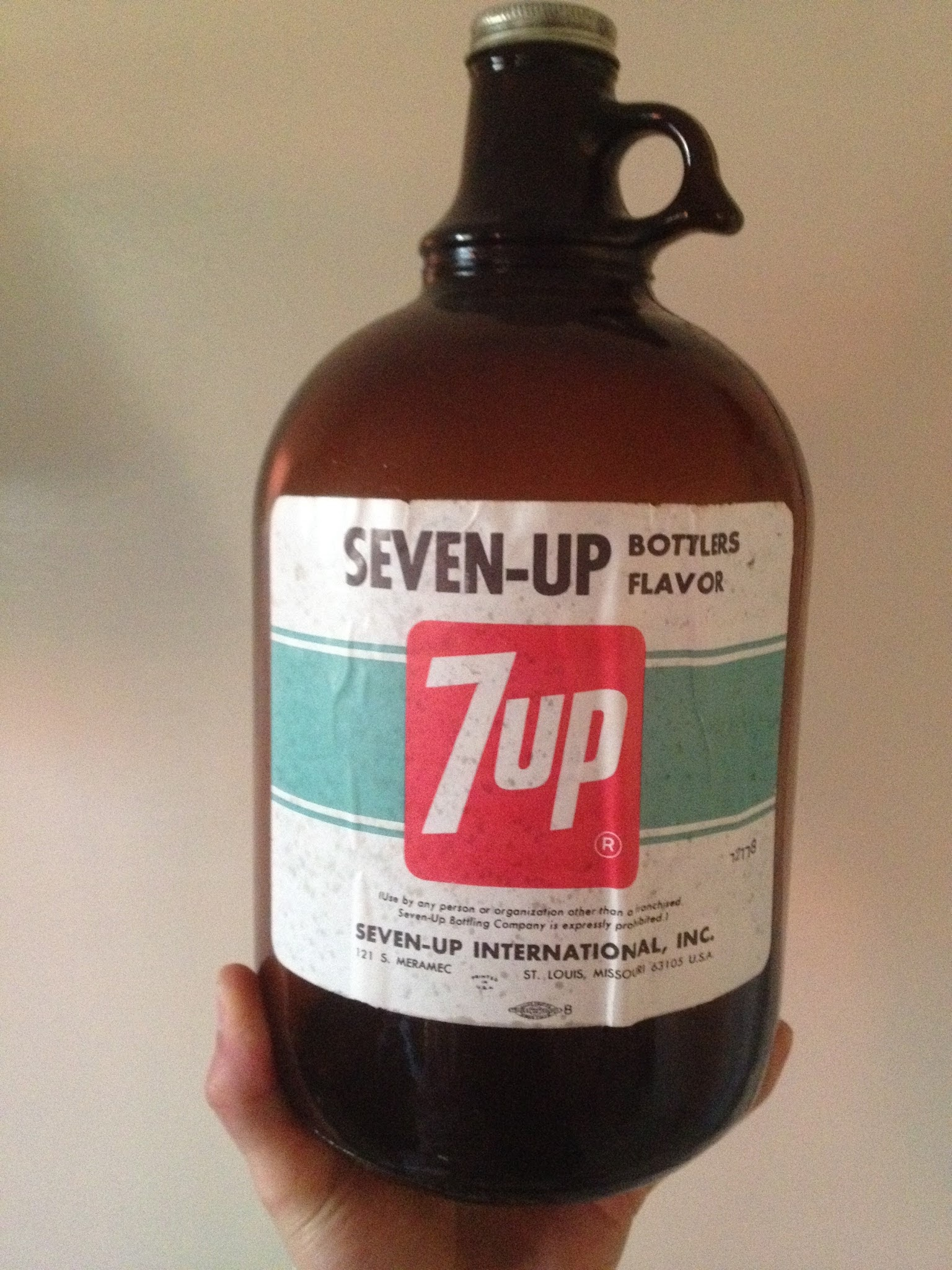
A mid-20th century jug of bottler's flavor for 7 Up: the syrup-like concentrate lacked sugar and was sold to franchisees then in this refillable form.

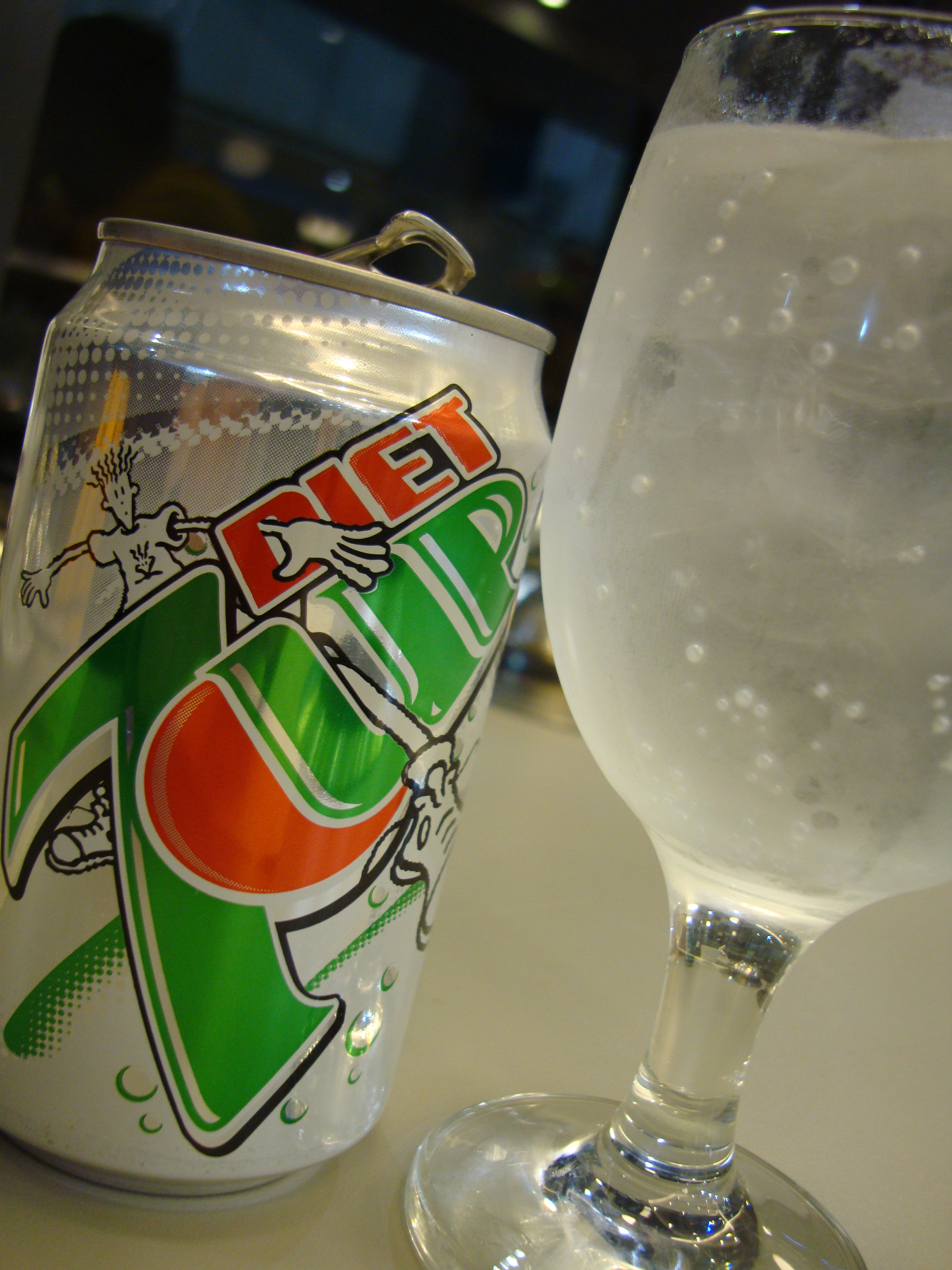
Diet 7 Up in 2009

=== United States ===
==== Regular ====
Name	Year launched	Notes	Ref.
7 Up	1928	A Lemon-Lime flavored soda and the original variety.	
Cherry 7 Up	1987	A variant with added Cherry flavor and a pink color. It was renamed and reformulated as Cherry 7 Up Antioxidant in January 2009; however, the soda's antioxidant line was pulled from shelves in 2012 amid a controversy about the rumored detrimental health effects of consuming antioxidant drinks, and the original formula returned.	
7 Up Gold	1988	A spice-flavored beverage, similar to Vernor's Ginger Ale. Though 7 Up's marketing slogan at that time was "Never Had It, Never Will" (referring to caffeine), 7 Up Gold included caffeine as an ingredient. It was introduced by 7 Up in the hopes of capturing 1% of the cola market, which at the time was $26.6 billion. However, it only captured 0.1% of the market because people were confused by 7 Up marketing a dark-colored soft drink with caffeine, and the drink was discontinued the following year. The 7 Up Gold recipe was actually an unused Dr Pepper invention. It was discontinued in 1989.	
Citrus 7	1980s	A fruity soda with real juices. Sold for a short time in the United States.	
dnL (7 Up turned upside down)	2002	An alternate take on 7 Up released in the United States containing an added citrus kick, green color and caffeine, made to rival Mountain Dew in the market. It was released during a time when other attempts to extend soft drink brand names were done with new variations, including Pepsi Blue, Dr Pepper Red Fusion, and Vanilla Coke. The drink was discontinued in 2006 in favor of the "7 Up Plus" brand.	
Pomegranate 7 Up	2007	A pomegranate flavoured variety that was sold for the holiday season in the United States from 2007 until 2010, and saw returns in 2016, 2021 and 2022. The 2009 and 2010 formulas were named Pomegranate 7 Up Antioxidant.	
7 Up Retro	2011	A variety sold in the United States that uses cane sugar instead of corn syrup. It was Introduced on the 2011 season finale of The Apprentice, packaging in 12-oz. cans features either the 1970s disco mirrorball-themed logo or the 1980s logo. It is also available in 12-oz. glass bottles with a label inspired by 7 Up's original logo.	
Mixed Berry 7 Up Antioxidant	2011	A mixed berry variety that was sold for a limited time in 2011. It used the "Antioxidant" formula.	
Tropical 7 Up	2014	A pineapple and mango flavored variety. It was sold in the United States in 2014 for a limited time, as well as a return in 2015 with newer branding. It was re-released in 2023 and sold exclusively at Kroger-owned stores. In early 2025, it became a nationwide flavor.	
Simple 7 Up	2022	A natural variant made using filtered water, cane sugar, and stevia leaf extract.	
Shirley Temple 7 Up	2024	A cherry and pomegranate flavored variant based on the lemon-lime soda and grenadine combination featured in the Shirley Temple non-alcoholic mixed drink.	
7-Up Watermelon & Strawberry	2025	A Watermelon and strawberry-flavored variant. It was released for the 2025 summer season exclusively in Kroger stores. It is the first installment in the "7-Up Endless Summer" series.	
7-Up Mandarin Orange	2026	A Mandarin Orange flavored variety, similar to the Orange 7-Up flavor sold overseas. It is the second installment in the "7-Up Endless Summer" series and is once again a Kroger exclusive.	
7 Up Hecho en Mexico		A variant of regular 7 UP sold in the United States produced and imported from Mexico using real cane sugar and packaged in 12-ounce glass bottles.	

==== Low Calorie ====
Name	Year launched	Notes	Ref.
7 Up Zero Sugar	1963	No calorie variant of 7 Up. It was originally introduced in 1963 under the name of Like (not to be confused with 7 Up's Like Cola from the 1980s), using cyclamate as sweetener. After the U.S. government ban of the sweetener the drink was discontinued in 1969, and relaunched as Diet 7 Up in 1970. The drink had a brief period of using the name Sugar Free 7 Up between 1973 and 1979 before reverting to its former name. Diet 7 Up was later reformulated and advertised as being sweetened with sucralose and acesulfame potassium replacing aspartame. The recipe later reverted to using aspartame. The beverage was rebranded as 7 Up Zero Sugar in late 2020.	
Cherry 7 Up Zero Sugar	1980s	Low-calorie version of Cherry 7 Up. It was pulled from shelves around the time 7 Up Plus Cherry was introduced but was reintroduced in 2006 due to popular demand. As with the regular variety, it was reformulated as Diet Cherry 7 Up Antioxidant in 2009 before reverting to the original formula in 2013. It was rebranded as Cherry 7 Up Zero Sugar in late 2020.	
Diet 7 Up Gold	1988	Low-calorie variant of 7 Up Gold, released and discontinued at the same time as the standard variety.	
7 Up Plus	2004	A range of healthy low-calorie alternative drinks, containing no caffeine and has 2 grams of carbohydrates per serving, as well as 5% apple juice, which is uncommon among American market carbonated beverages. It was available in three varieties - Mixed Berry, Cherry and Island Fruit.	
Diet Pomegranate 7 Up	2007	A low calorie pomegranate flavoured variety that was sold for the holiday season in the United States from 2007 until 2010. The 2009 and 2010 formulas were named Diet Pomegranate 7 Up Antioxidant.	
Diet Mixed Berry 7 Up Antioxidant	2011	A mixed berry variety that was sold for a limited time in 2011. It used the "Antioxidant" formula.	
7 Up Ten	2013	A low-calorie variant with only ten calories per serving, sold as part of Dr. Pepper Snapple Group's "Ten" lineup in the United States. It uses a blend using high fructose corn syrup along with aspartame and acesulfame potassium to sweeten it.	
Tropical 7 Up Zero Sugar	2023	Low calorie Mango and Pineapple flavored variety, originally sold exclusively at Kroger-owned stores, later becoming a nationwide flavor in early 2025.	
7-Up Zero Sugar Watermelon & Strawberry	2025	A Watermelon and strawberry-flavored variant. It was released for the 2025 summer season exclusively in Kroger stores. It is the first installment in the "7-Up Endless Summer" series.	
7-Up Zero Sugar Mandarin Orange	2026	A Mandarin Orange flavored variety, similar to the Orange 7-Up flavor sold overseas. It is the second installment in the "7-Up Endless Summer" series and is once again a Kroger exclusive.	

=== International ===
Name	Year launched	Notes	Ref.
7 Up with Cherry on Top	1989	A variety originally sold in the United Kingdom (Originally as Cherry 7 Up), although has since been discontinued. It is differentiated from the US variety as it is a pure Cherry flavored drink with a completely different recipe. It was also sold in the Netherlands during the early-1990s, and currently in France since 2014.	
7 Up Ice Cola	1995	Produced by PepsiCo for the Netherlands and a few other international territories, this was a clear cola, in essence, a repackaging of Crystal Pepsi. As with that, it failed in the market and was discontinued shortly afterward.	
Orange 7 Up	1980s	A variety with added orange flavor. It was sold in many non-US territories by PepsiCo throughout the 1990s including Canada (As 7 Up Orange Chill) Thailand (As 7 Up Clear Orange Flavour), Germany (As Orange 7 Up Plus), Austria (As 7 Up Orange) and The Netherlands (as 7 Up Clear Orange).	
Raspberry 7 Up	1980s	A variety with added raspberry flavor. It was sold for a short time in some European territories and in Canada (as 7 Up Raspberry Chill) and was later sold in several Asian territories including Vietnam (from 2002) before becoming sold exclusively in Singapore.	
7 Up Revive	1990	A special variant sold in India and Laos and is marketed as an Isotonic drink. It was relaunched in 2015, and prior to that was also sold in other Asian territories such as Malaysia, Brunei Darussalam and Vietnam.	
7 Up Free/7 Up Light/7 Up Zero Sugar	1990s	The alternative to Diet 7 Up sold in countries such as Iceland, UK, Ireland, Mexico, Spain, Norway, Sweden, Argentina, Finland, UAE, Uruguay, Pakistan, the Netherlands, Thailand, Malaysia, France and Germany. However, some regions also have it under the original Diet 7 Up brand. In the UK, the drink was originally branded as 7 Up Light until rebranding as 7 Up Free in 2005.	
7 Up Tropical Twist	2002	A tropical flavored drink that was sold in Canada by PepsiCo for a limited time in 2002 as 7 Up Tropical Splash, and re-released for a limited time in 2018. It was also sold in the Netherlands during 2002.	
7 Up Citrus Splash	2004	A variety with added Pink Grapefruit flavor. It was sold in Canada by PepsiCo until being discontinued in 2006, with a brief re-release in 2008.	
7 Up Ice	2004	A mint-flavoured variety which was sold by PepsiCo in a few international territories such as Portugal, Russia, France and Mexico before being discontinued in 2006.	
7 Up Ice Tropical	2006	A variant of 7 Up Ice with added tropical flavor. Only sold in Russia.	
7 Up Frootaz	2000s	A tropical flavored variety sold by PepsiCo in the Philippines for a short time in the 2000s.	
7 Up H2OH!	2000s	A range of lightly carbonated water drinks that were sold in Latin America, Malaysia, the UK, and Ireland in the late 2000s, it was discontinued as a 7 Up-exclusive variant in the early 2010s. In South America, it is sold solely under the brand H2OH!, distributed for the first time in 2005, with exotic flavors such as: Grapefruit, lemon lime, apple, passion fruit, and many more.	
7 Up Lemon Squeeze	2007	A variety with extra lemon juice. It was sold in Canada by PepsiCo for a limited time during the 2007 season, as the Canadian alternative to Sierra Mist Lemon Squeeze.	
7 Up Clear Dry	2010	A limited edition no-calorie variant with a high carbonation and caffeine count. It was sold exclusively in Japan by Suntory.	
7 Up Yerbabuena	2013	A variety containing the Yerba buena mint. It was available for a limited time in Colombia in 2013.	
Salted Lemon 7 Up	2014	A variant exclusively sold in Hong Kong that contains Salted Lemon. It is a common drink that can be found in dai pai dong and cha chaan teng. It is also named one of the Hong Kong summer drinks by Cathay Pacific Discovery.	
7 Up Mojito	2014	A mint-flavored variety that was first released in France, but was later released in Belgium and Germany as well.	
7 Up Cocktail Exotique	2014	A tropical flavored variety sold in France, originally as 7 Up Goût Tropical.	
7 Up Free Mojito	2016	Low calorie variant of 7 Up Mojito sold in the United Kingdom, and later was released in Belgium and France.	
7 Up Lemon Lemon	2016	A lemonade sold in France, the Netherlands and Belgium.	
7 Up Free Cherry/7 Up Zero Sugar Cherry	2020	A low-calorie cherry variant sold in the United Kingdom. It was originally known as 7 Up Free Cherry.	
7 Up Zero Sugar Pink Lemonade	2025	A low-calorie raspberry variant sold in the United Kingdom. It has a pink color scheme.	

=== Barbecue sauces and marinades ===
In 2007, Cadbury Schweppes entered into a licensing partnership with Vita Food Products to produce a line of barbecue sauces and marinades flavored with Dr Pepper, 7 Up, and A&W Root Beer.

== Advertising campaigns ==
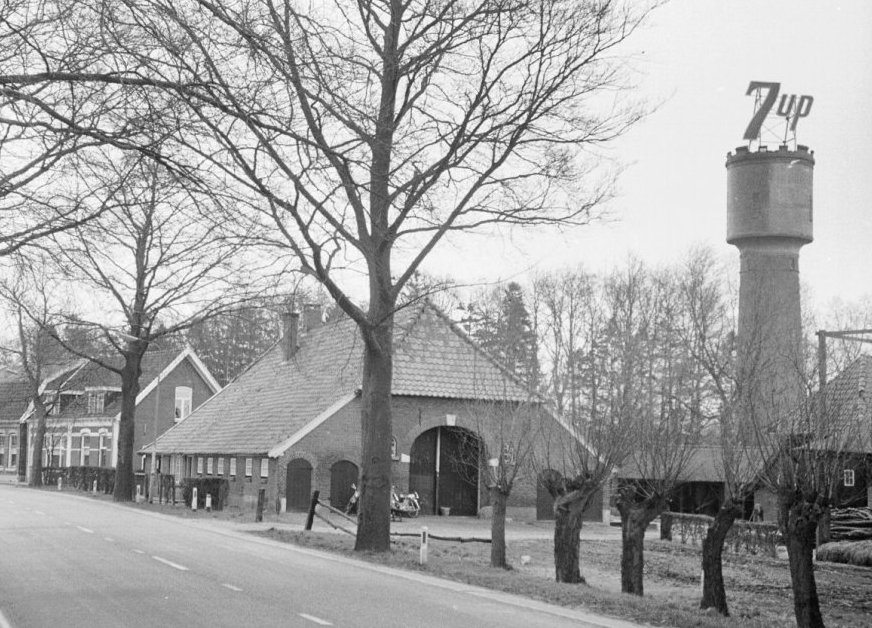
Advertisement on the water tower of Goor, the Netherlands, in 1967

Metal pedestrian crossing markers saying "Drink 7up Safety First" were installed in many U.S. cities in the 1930s.

"Fresh-Up Freddie" was the rooster mascot for 7 Up in the 1950s. He gave viewers lessons about how to plan successful parties and picnics by having plenty of 7 Up on hand. The commercials were produced by Disney, giving the character the specific Disney look of the time. Freddie has been described as a hybrid of the rooster Panchito Pistoles from The Three Caballeros and the zany Aracuan Bird from the same film. He often was dressed in human clothes. Freddie also appeared in the 1957 Zorro TV series' commercial intermissions. In these commercials, Freddie fought with Pete the Cat. Freddie, who was featured in a small amount of merchandising, was voiced by Paul Frees.

In the late 1960s and 1980s, Geoffrey Holder appeared in television ads as part of 7 Up's "Uncola" ad campaign, designed to highlight differences between 7 Up and other soft drinks on the market with cola flavoring. In the ads, Geoffrey holds a pair of cola nuts in one hand and a lemon & lime (used to flavor 7 Up) in the other hand and describes them as "Uncola nuts".

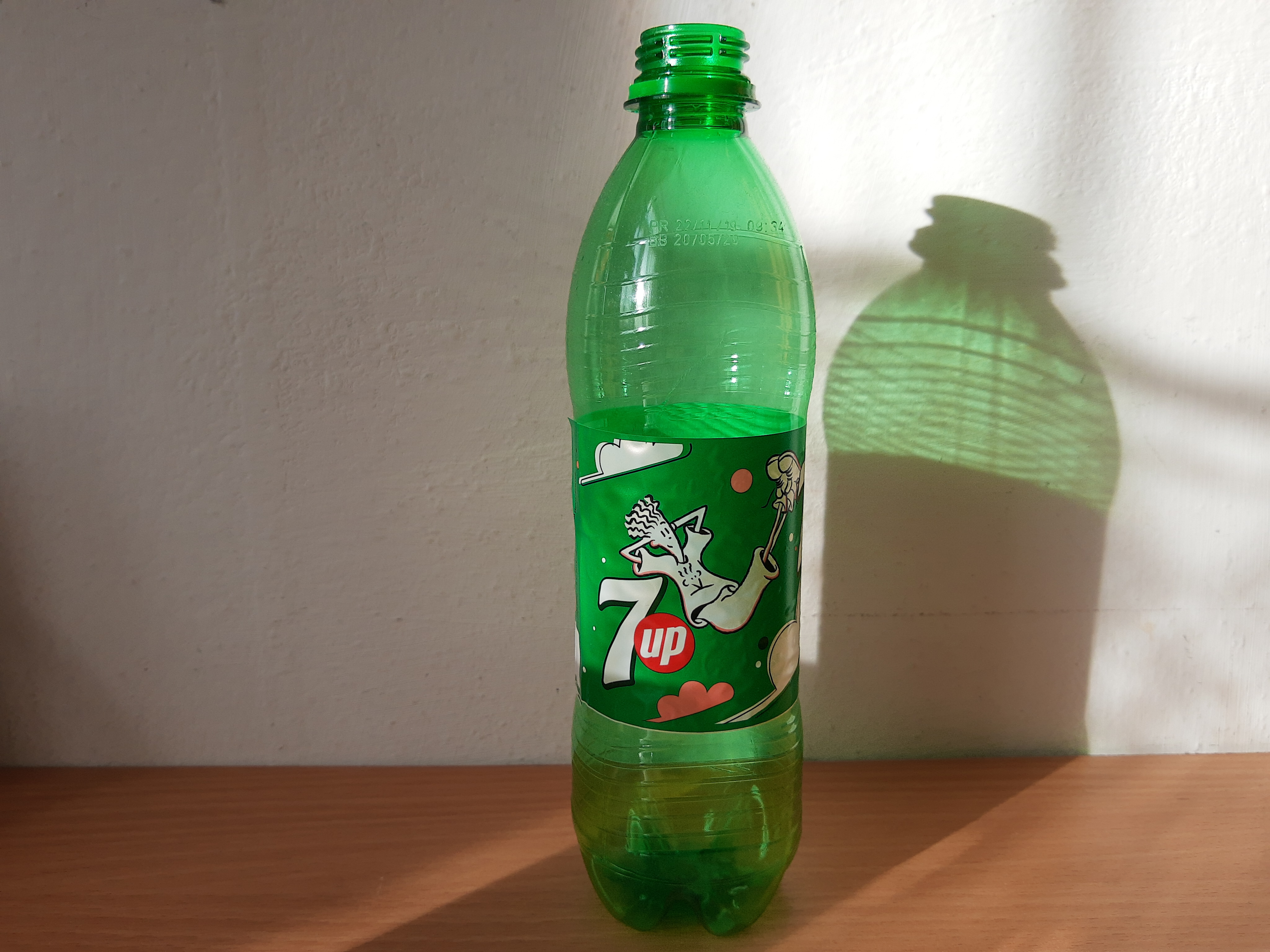
Fido Dido on a Maltese limited edition bottle of 7up

In 1987, 7 Up introduced Spot, the red-orange dot in the 7 Up logo anthropomorphized into a mascot. The character was used heavily in advertising and licensed items across the U.S., including the 1993 platformer video game Cool Spot, and its 1995 sequel, Spot Goes to Hollywood.

The cartoon character Fido Dido was instead used as the 7 Up mascot in international areas from the late 1980s through the early 1990s, and was reintroduced in international markets in the early 2000s. Since PepsiCo did not own the rights to 7 Up in the US, certain ads featuring Fido Dido were instead reworked to advertise the company's Slice brand of lemon-lime soda.

In the early 2000s, Orlando Jones served as the spokesperson for 7 Up in the United States in a series of commercials. Notably, one commercial had him wear a t-shirt that had 7 Up's then-slogan Make 7 Up Yours divided between the front and back with the double entendre on the back that featured the Up Yours part; 7 Up would sell the shirt through specialty retailer Spencer Gifts for many years.

== Corporate sponsorship ==
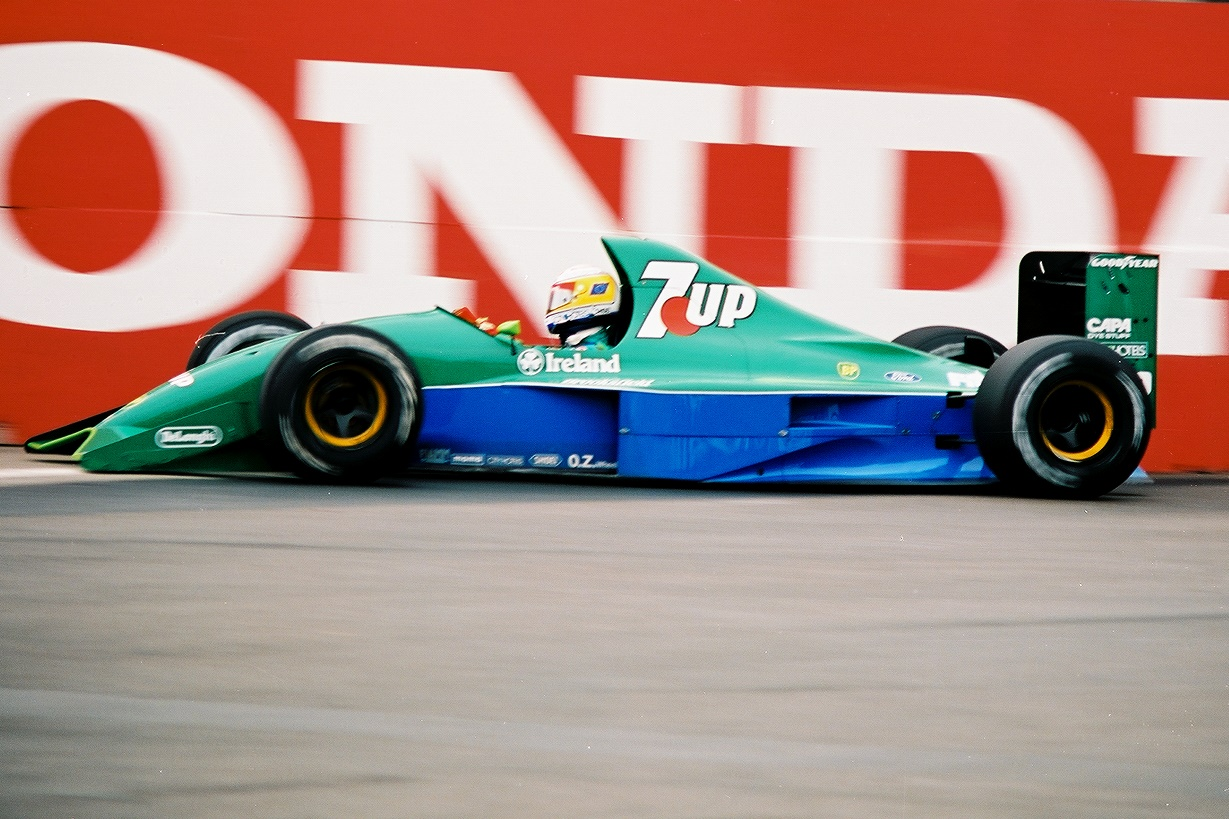
The 7 Up Jordan 191 at the 1991 United States Grand Prix, driven by Bertrand Gachot

In 1974, 7 Up became The Jerry Lewis MDA Labor Day Telethon's first corporate sponsor; this was at a time when its sponsorship was generally limited to trade unions and civic organizations.

7 Up became the primary sponsor for the Jordan Grand Prix Formula One team in 1991, where their distinctive green livery on the Jordan 191 placed 5th in the overall team standings. Notably, Michael Schumacher made his Formula One debut in the 191 at the 1991 Belgian Grand Prix when he filled in for Bertrand Gachot. Because of its distinct color and design, the 7 Up Jordan 191 is widely considered to be one of the most beautiful Formula One cars of all time.

7 up sponsored Italian football club ACF Fiorentina during the 1992–93 and 1993–94 seasons. They were the sponsor on the banned 1992–93 away shirt that contained an accidental swastika in the shirt's design.

== See also ==
- Fizz-nik
- Vess
- Seven-Up Headquarters
