= Surge (drink) =

Brand of citrus-flavored soft drink

- Type: Citrus soda
- Manufacturer: The Coca-Cola Company
- Origin: United States
- Introduced: February 7, 1997; 29 years ago (original run); 2014; 12 years ago (Amazon-exclusive; revival); 2015; 11 years ago (Eastern United States); August 2018; 8 years ago (all Burger King Coca-Cola Freestyle machines)
- Discontinued: 2003; 23 years ago (original run)
- Color: Light Green
- Related products: Citra/Fanta Citrus; Mello Yello; Mountain Dew; Sprite; Sun Drop; Urge; Vault

Surge (sometimes styled as SURGE) is a citrus-flavored soft drink first produced in the 1990s by the Coca-Cola Company to compete with Pepsi's Mountain Dew. Surge was advertised as having a more "hardcore" edge, much like Mountain Dew's advertising at the time, in an attempt to lure customers away from Pepsi. It was originally launched in Norway as Urge in 1996, and was so popular that it was released in the United States as Surge in 1997. Lagging sales caused production to be ended in 2003 for most markets.

However, popular fan bases such as Facebook's "SURGE Movement" led Coca-Cola to re-release the soft drink on September 15, 2014, for the US market via Amazon Prime in 12-packs of 16-US-fluid-ounce (470 mL) cans. Following a test-market for the beverage in the Southeastern United States in early 2015, Surge was re-released primarily in convenience stores in the Eastern United States and some Mountain states in September 2015. Surge was re-released internationally in September 2018 in Burger King restaurants in the Coca-Cola Freestyle machines.

== History ==
=== Early years ===
Urge: the Norwegian variant of Surge

Surge, under the name of Urge, was first launched on the Norwegian market as a test product on April 22, 1996. It was first formally unveiled by Coca-Cola on December 16, 1996. Prior to production, its original white paper name was "MDK," or "Mountain Dew Killer", as it was developed to converge with Mello Yello as a means of slowing Mountain Dew growth. Coke's attempts to draw users away with divergent products like OK Soda or with similar ones like Mello Yello had not succeeded. Surge was intended to improve on Mountain Dew by using maltodextrin for a longer-lasting blast of energy and with bolder, brighter presentation.

While preparations for the US launch were underway, the Norwegian branch of Coca-Cola was battling a successful launch of Mountain Dew in their market. Because the Surge brand was already registered by another firm, the product was launched as "Urge" and bottled by Ringnes, bottler of other Coca-Cola products at the time. It was seen as a competitor of the Norwegian orange soda Solo, also bottled by Ringnes. The Norwegian market was chosen as a test market due to high consumption of carbonated beverages – then fifth worldwide – and its small population, making it easy to get feedback quickly.

Local food regulation prevented the bright green color from being used, so it was launched with a pale, more natural juice drink look and given a slight orange taste to match the flavor with the color. The label's color was described as "grungy green and orange", which were noted as being fashionable at the time.

The product sold well, particularly among the 12–19 age group, leading to its worldwide release. By the end of January 1997, the product had reached 2.2% market share in Norway. The sale of Surge in North America began on January 13, 1997, when the drink was released to 140 markets across the United States. Its release was accompanied by a $50 million nationwide marketing campaign that led to high sales and popularity. A few years after the release, sales began to slip. Surge continued to be sold in vending machines, and 5-foot-7-inch-tall (1.70 m) promotional coolers. The Surge coolers were placed in high traffic areas in gas stations as a key promotion to push sales away from competitors coolers in the back of stores all over the United States. Surge could be found in cans and fountain drinks until its eventual discontinuation in 2003.

Until September 15, 2014, when Coca-Cola re-released Surge, Norway was the only country where one could still buy a similar soft drink in any form, as the original Surge recipe was still popular there.

Surge was widely associated with the extreme sports lifestyle, with television commercials similar to those used by Mountain Dew at the time. The drink was also prominently advertised by World Championship Wrestling, with product placement on WCW Monday Nitro and pay-per-view. Coca-Cola also used provocative catchphrases to market Surge to extreme sports enthusiasts and teenagers alike. Some of these catchphrases included "Feed the Rush", "Life's a Scream" and the references to Surge as "A Fully Loaded Citrus Soda." Further touted was that Surge had a considerable number of carbohydrates, hence the "with carbos" tagline that was occasionally used in the marketing campaigns to emphasize the fact that Surge was supposed to be more than a soda, but an energy drink as well.

After its inception, Surge's logo was updated and redesigned to a sharper and more modern look by graphic designer and marketer Colin Nekritz.

=== Trademark ===
In 1997, Coca-Cola settled a trademark dispute with Babson Bros., an industrial cleaning product company whose cow-milking machine has been known as Surge since 1925.

=== Revival ===
After the discontinuation of Surge in cans, a community was formed by web designer Eric "Karks" Karkovack entitled "Save Surge". The community initially mapped the locations at which Surge could be purchased in fountain form. Upon cancellation of the fountain syrup, the community continued, adopting an approach of activism that led to the creation of the citrus soda Vault in June 2005. After Vault's release, Karkovack announced the closure of SaveSurge.org. Vault was discontinued in 2011.

As a result of Vault's discontinuation, a group was started on Facebook by Evan Carr called the "Surge Movement". The group repeatedly posted requests on Coca-Cola's Facebook page, and encouraged its members to call Coca-Cola's consumer affairs hotline at 1-800-GET-COKE to voice their desires further, once every month. The movement gained around 200,000 Facebook "likes" in the months after it was started and continues to grow.

On September 15, 2014, Surge was re-released as an Amazon.com exclusive in packs of twelve 16-US-fluid-ounce (470 ml) cans.

On February 10, 2015, Coca-Cola announced that it had begun test-marketing Surge with independent resellers and vending machines across the Southeast United States. The test run ended in late-May 2015. Two months later, Coca-Cola announced that it was preparing for a large-scale Surge retail release across the Eastern United States. Surge was re-released at convenience stores across the Eastern United States on September 7, 2015.

In August 2018, Surge became available in Coca-Cola Freestyle machines, exclusively at Burger King. It is available in several varieties, including Cherry, Grape, Vanilla, and Zero Sugar.

According to a Facebook post by The Surge Movement, Surge was phased out of Burger King Coca-Cola Freestyle machines in January 2024.

=== Slushy versions ===
In 1999, 7-Eleven introduced a Surge-flavored Slurpee.

On November 16, 2015, Burger King restaurants released a slushy version of the beverage called "Frozen Surge" as a limited edition slushy. Burger King reintroduced it in their restaurants as a fountain drink in August 2018.

In late 2016, Valero Corner Stores partnered with Icee to release an Icee form of Surge at select locations.

On January 11, 2017, Cinemark Theatres released a slushy version of the beverage called "Surge Frozen" for a limited time before being discontinued in spring 2017.

== Formulation ==
Comparisons of Surge have been made to a later Coca-Cola product, Vault, which was first released in 2005—around two years after the discontinuation of Surge. Vault has also been discontinued as of December 2011. The two drinks are noted to have had similar taste, although Vault contained higher levels of caffeine at 70.5 mg per 12 fl. oz serving (equivalent to 199 mg/L) and contained artificial flavors in its recipe. The caffeine content of Surge was comparable to that of other citrus soft drinks in the American market during its time at 51 mg per 12 fl. oz serving (144 mg/L).

Below is a listing of the ingredients of Surge, per the label on the canned and bottled versions, as well as the ingredient listings from both a Surge fountain syrup box, and a Surge frozen carbonated beverage (FCB) box. All four differ slightly; however, more information regarding the Surge formulation can be gleaned from both syrup variations, as they were to be mixed using a ratio of 4.4 parts cold, carbonated water to 1 part syrup.

Surge can/bottle (1997—2006)	Surge fountain syrup	Surge FCB syrup	Surge can (2014)	Urge
Carbonated water	High-fructose corn syrup and/or sucrose	High fructose corn syrup and/or sucrose	Carbonated water	Carbonated water
High-fructose corn syrup and/or sucrose	Water	Water	High-fructose corn syrup	Sugar
Maltodextrin
Citric acid
Natural flavors				Orange juice concentrate
Orange juice concentrate				Potassium sorbate
Potassium benzoate	Potassium benzoate	Yucca extract	Potassium benzoate	Sodium citrate
EDTA and erythorbic acid	EDTA and erythorbic acid	Quillaia	Potassium citrate	Flavoring
Potassium citrate	Potassium citrate	Potassium benzoate	Caffeine	Caffeine
Caffeine		EDTA and erythorbic acid	Calcium disodium EDTA	Ascorbic acid
Yellow #5	Yellow #5	Potassium citrate	Yellow #5	Beta-carotene
Yellow #6	Yellow #6	Caffeine	Yellow #6	Carob bean gum
Carob bean gum	Carob bean gum	Yellow #5	Carob bean gum	
Blue #1	Blue #1	Yellow #6	Blue #1	
		Carob bean gum		
		Blue #1		

== See also ==
- Bawls
- Jolt Cola
- Josta
