= Microdosing =

Drug experimentation technique

Microdosing, or micro-dosing, involves the administration of sub-therapeutic doses of drugs to study their effects in humans, aiming to gather preliminary data on safety, pharmacokinetics, and potential therapeutic benefits without producing significant physiological effects. This is called a "Phase 0 study" and is usually conducted before clinical Phase I to predict whether a drug is viable for the next phase of testing. Human microdosing aims to reduce the resources spent on non-viable drugs and the amount of testing done on animals.

Less commonly, the term "microdosing" can be used to refer to precise dispensing of small amounts of a drug substance (e.g., a powder API) for a drug product (e.g., a capsule) and, when the drug substance also happens to be liquid, this can potentially overlap with the term microdispensing.

== Techniques ==
The basic approach is to label a candidate drug using the radio isotope carbon-14, then administer the compound to human volunteers at very low doses: no more than 100 micrograms, and no more than 1/100 of the highest dose that caused no adverse effects in animal studies.

As only microdose levels of the drug are used, analytical methods are limited. Extreme sensitivity is needed. Accelerator mass spectrometry (AMS) is the most common method for microdose analysis. AMS was developed in the late 1970s from two distinct research threads with a common goal: an improvement in radiocarbon dating that would make efficient use of datable material and that would extend the routine and maximum reach of radiocarbon dating. AMS is routinely used in geochronology and archaeology, but biological applications began appearing in 1990 mainly due to the work of scientists at Lawrence Livermore National Laboratory. AMS service is now more accessible for biochemical quantitation from several private companies and non-commercial access to AMS is available at the National Institutes of Health (NIH) Research Resource at Lawrence Livermore National Laboratory, or through the development of smaller affordable spectrometers. AMS does not measure the radioactivity of carbon-14 in microdose samples. AMS, like other mass spectrometry methods, measures ionic species according to mass-to-charge ratio.

=== Psychedelic ===
Psychedelic microdosing is the practice of using sub-threshold doses (microdoses) of serotonergic psychedelic drugs in an attempt to improve mood, focus, creativity and energy, though there is little evidence for these effects. In a 2021 placebo-controlled study with 191 participants, the reported benefits could be explained by the placebo effect.

== Impact of psychedelic microdosing ==
In 2021 it was reported in a study done that an increased conscientiousness was seen due to microdosing. Microdosing was seen to have improved mental health after microdosing with psychedelics after 30 days. More research is needed to ultimately decide whether or not microdosing helps those who have depression and anxiety. Microdosing has not seen to improve participants motor responses, attention, and cognitive problem-solving abilities. Microdosing is still under investigation as to whether it works or not. Researchers are investigating into microdosing more and more, the placebo effect causes difficulties in research on this topic.

In January 2006, the European Union Microdose AMS Partnership Programme (EUMAPP) was launched. Ten organizations from five different countries (United Kingdom, Sweden, Netherlands, France, and Poland) studied various approaches to the basic AMS technique. EUMAPP, together with the CREAM trials in Europe and the NEDO trials in Japan, became one of the pivotal microdosing validation studies.

One of the most meaningful potential outcomes of Phase-0/Microdosing studies is the early termination of development. In 2017, Okour et al published the first example in literature of a termination of an oral drug based on IV microdose data.

== See also ==
- Pharmacology
