= Urge (drink) =

Citrus flavored soft drink

- Type: Citrus soda
- Manufacturer: The Coca-Cola Company
- Distributor: Coca-Cola Norway
- Country of origin: Norway
- Introduced: April 1996; 29 years ago
- Color: Carotene E160a
- Variants: Surge, Urge Uten Sukker (Diet)
- Related products: Vault
- Website: Urge

Urge is a citrus-flavored soft drink produced by Coca-Cola Norway that was first introduced in the country in 1996, and later on was released in Denmark and Sweden. It is the predecessor of the American soft drink Surge, which was introduced in the US in 1997. Urge was discontinued in Denmark and Sweden in 2001. In Norway, Urge sales increased greatly over the years reaching a market share near 10% despite receiving no marketing since its initial launch.

== Launch ==
The product was first released on 22 April 1996 as a test product. Originally bottled by Ringnes along with other Coca-Cola products, it was a competitor to Ringnes' orange soda, Solo. The Norwegian market was chosen as a test market due to high consumption of carbonated beverages – then fifth worldwide – and its small population, making it easy to get feedback quickly.

The label's color was described as "grungy green and orange", which were noted as being fashionable at the time.

The product sold well, particularly among the 12–19 age group, leading to its worldwide release. By the end of January 1997, the product had reached 2.2% market share in Norway.

== Sizes ==
Urge was available in Norway in 0.5 L and 1.5 L bottles, and later also in 0.33 L cans, but in Q1 of 1999 the 1.5 L bottles were taken off the market due to unsatisfactory sales. The cans also vanished from the market a few years later, leaving only the 0.5 L bottles.

A massive campaign by the consumers on Facebook led to the relaunch of the 1.5 L bottle size on 1 September 2008. It has a sugar content of 68 grams per 0.5 L bottle.

In February 2017, due to fan demand, the 0.33 L cans were reintroduced in a multipack of four.

Urge Intense: Energy drink variant

== Varieties ==
=== Urge Intense ===
Urge Intense was an energy drink variant of Urge. It was launched in 2009 in association with the Facebook group that pressured Coca-Cola to relaunch the 1.5L bottles. Much like with many other energy drinks like Burn and Monster Energy, Urge Intense Triple Rush came in 0.5L cans and has a high caffeine content of 32 mg per 100 mL.

The Urge Intense range was discontinued in 2016.

Name	Launched	Discontinued	Notes
Urge Intense Triple Rush	2009	2016	The original variety.
Urge Intense Red Sting	2010	2012	A raspberry-flavored variety.
Urge Intense Inferno	2012	2014	An orange-flavored variety.
Urge Intense Wild Mango	2013	2016	A mango-flavored variety.

=== Urge Uten Sukker ===
In September 2017, a zero-sugar version was launched known as Urge Uten Sukker ('Urge Without Sugar'), which, like its regular counterpart, was made especially for Norway. This sugar-free variant came in orange-tinted bottles, before switching to the clear ones regular Urge uses.

Name	Launched	Discontinued	Notes
Urge Uten Sukker	2017	N/A	Sugar-free version of Urge.
Urge Chill Guarana	2018	2019	A guarana-flavored variant.
Urge Smooth Mango	2020	N/A	A mango-flavored variant.
Urge Holiday Flavor Fruity Flavor	2021	2022	A julebrus-flavored variant, sold for the 2021 holiday season.

== Nutritional information ==
Nutritional facts
Per 100 mL:
Energy	238 kJ / 56 kcal
Protein	0 g
Carbohydrates	13.5 g
Fat	0 g
