= Vault (drink) =

Carbonated beverage

- Type: Citrus soda/Energy drink
- Manufacturer: The Coca-Cola Company
- Origin: United States
- Introduced: June 2005; 21 years ago
- Discontinued: December 2011; 14 years ago
- Color: Yellow-green
- Variants: Vault Zero; Vault Red Blitz
- Related products: Mello Yello; Mountain Dew; Sprite; Sun Drop; Surge; Urge
- Website: drinkvault.com

Vault was a sweetened energy drink and carbonated beverage that was released by The Coca-Cola Company in June 2005 and marketed until December 2011. It was touted as an artificially flavored hybrid energy soda. Coca-Cola was marketing Vault as a combination with the slogan "Drinks like a soda, kicks like an energy drink," as well as "The Taste. The Quench. The Kick." "Get it done, and then some", "Chug & Charge", and "Get to it!".

== Marketing ==
Vault was a citrus-flavored beverage containing many of the same ingredients as the Coca-Cola beverage Surge. It was discontinued in 2011 in favor of a reintroduced Mello Yello.

Test-marketing occurred in a limited area from June 2005 through Labor Day 2005. During this time, the drink was only available in certain markets in Alabama, Georgia, Kansas, Michigan, North Carolina, South Carolina, Tennessee, Virginia, Texas, and West Virginia. Vault was released nationally in February 2006 following commercials that were shown during the pregame show for Super Bowl XL.

== Formulation ==
Coca-Cola representatives and the American Beverage Association stated that Vault contained 47 mg of caffeine per 237 ml (8 fl. oz.) serving, or 70.5 mg per 355 ml (12 fl. oz.) can, and 117.5 mg per 20 fl. oz. PET bottle. This caffeine amount was substantially higher than Surge's 52.5 mg per 12 fl. oz., Mountain Dew's 54 mg per 12 fl. oz., Mello Yello's 51 mg per 12 fl. oz., or Sun Drop's 63 mg per 12 fl. oz.

There were several varieties of Vault, the two most common being Vault and Vault Zero.

Ingredients of Vault varieties
Vault	Vault Zero
Carbonated water	Carbonated water
Citric acid	Citric acid
High-fructose corn syrup	Aspartame
Natural and artificial flavors	Natural and artificial flavors
Concentrated orange juice	Concentrated orange juice
Sodium benzoate	Sodium benzoate
Erythorbic acid and EDTA	Erythorbic acid and EDTA
Caffeine	Caffeine
Potassium citrate	Potassium citrate
Yellow #5	Yellow #5
Carob bean gum	Carob bean gum
	Acesulfame potassium

== Packaging ==
Vault was available in 16.9 fl oz, 20 fl oz, and 24 fl oz. PET bottles, 6-, 12- and 18-, and 24-pack cans, 1- and 2-liter bottles, and 16 oz extended cans.

== Variants ==
In September 2005, The Coca-Cola Company released Vault Zero, a diet version of the citrus soda. Grape Vault and Peach Vault were two variants available only from Coca-Cola Freestyle machines.

== Advertising ==
Television commercials for Vault featured men performing extraordinary tasks while drinking Vault, in line with the slogan, "Vault. Get to it!" One such commercial featured a man building a robotic scarecrow with laser eyes that rids his farm of crows, foxes, rabbits, and hippies. Other commercials included a man converting his and his neighbors' backyards into a football field using explosives and a chainsaw; a man renovating his house into a giant birdcage; a man who blows up a reef bed to obtain a large amount of pearls in order to win his girlfriend back from a Fabioesque man, and a man excelling at paintball, at one point using a squirrel as an improvised weapon.

== Expansion ==
Vault Red Blitz, a new Vault flavor, was released in late-February 2007 to compete with PepsiCo's Mountain Dew Code Red, along with promotional pricing in select areas. Until its release, Coca-Cola had only released Mello Yello Cherry in limited markets as a competitor to Code Red, which has been available since 2001. Vault Red Blitz is berry-flavored, red, and also features the herbal supplement guarana.

Vault Red Blitz

In 2006, Vault Zero was reformulated in response to a lawsuit over allegations that ingredients in Fanta Pineapple and Vault Zero had the potential in certain circumstances to combine to form benzene, a carcinogenic compound.

== See also ==
- List of defunct consumer brands
