= Josta =

Soft drink

- Type: Energy soft drink
- Manufacturer: PepsiCo
- Origin: United States
- Introduced: 1995
- Discontinued: 1999
- Related products: Vault; Bawls; Surge; Jolt

Josta was a soft drink brand that was produced by PepsiCo and the first energy drink ever introduced by a major US beverage company. It was marketed as a "high-energy drink" with guarana and caffeine.

Josta was introduced in 1995, but PepsiCo pulled the drink from its lineup due to a change in corporate strategy in 1999. Shortly before the beverage was discontinued, an "Association for Josta Saving" was started. A "Save Josta" campaign was also launched by fans of the drink; their website "www.savejosta.org" was defunct for several years but was reactivated in 2011.

== Advertising ==
Josta used the slogan "better do the good stuff now." In a commercial for Josta, an older man tells a younger man about his life as a youth, and how he wished he had more fun.

== Popular culture ==
A Josta drink appears in the 2021 Disney+ series Loki.

An advertising poster for Josta appears in Madison Square Garden in the 1998 film Godzilla.
