= Microdispensing =

Microdispensing is the technique of producing liquid media dosages in volumes of less than one microlitre. The continuing miniaturization in almost all technical areas creates constant challenges for industry, development and research facilities. Microdispensing is one of those challenges. Ever smaller amounts of adhesive, liquid, oil, grease and a multitude of other media must be dispensed reliably and accurately in dosage and placement with short cycle times. The precise positioning and quantity of fluids such as glue, reagents or any other substance has a great influence on the overall quality of a medical device. A few examples are:

- Micro-dosing systems with a quantity as small as 50 picolitres
- Volumetric systems for use with adhesives and spraying systems for silicone coating needles and other surfaces

Microdispensing is also used in non-medical applications, like on-demand soda flavoring (the Coca-Cola Freestyle and Pepsi Spire), inkjet printing, and 3-D printing.

== Dispensing techniques ==
There are two basic types of dispensing techniques: classic contact dispensing and non-contact dispensing.

=== Contact dispensing ===
In contact dispensing, the drop forms at the exit of a nozzle, and is deposited by contact, while the drop is still on the nozzle. The technique is as old as the wish to divide a medium, stored in a big container, into smaller amounts. A good example for this is applying adhesive with a tube: To apply the adhesive requires contact between the tip of the tube and the part for the bead of adhesive to be transferred. This method has disadvantages:

- Slow dispensing
- Part has to be touched
- Part could be damaged
- Adhesive forms threads
- Adhesive is not in the expected place
- Adhesive amounts are difficult to reproduce

Despite all of these disadvantages, contact dispensing is still used in the majority of automated processes today, because of:

- A lack of knowledge regarding non-contact dispensing systems
- Few manufacturers for non-contact dispensing systems
- No direct access to dispensing area (e.g. undercuts)
- Medium can not be dispensed without contact
- Dispensing without stress to Medium is possible
- More precise dispensing especially at bead dispensing
- Simple to clean in most cases

=== Typical technologies for contact dispensing ===
Gear pump

- high-frequency pulsation
- high performance
- always valves
- no solids possible

Pressure-time systems

- many components
- pragmatic evaluation of quantity and control
- add. power source: air
- volume flow depends on pressure, time and temperature

=== Non-contact dispensing (Jetting) ===
In non-contact dispensing, the drop also forms at the end of a nozzle, but far enough away from the target area that the drop separates from the nozzle before it hits. This, too, is a very old technique, as old as squirting liquid from a tube.

Because of increasing requirements in regards to cycle time and accuracy in almost all areas of production, non-contact dispensing is constantly gaining importance. A good example for this is the attachment of very small electronic parts (SMD parts) onto printed circuit boards and substrates. For this, the part carrier only needs to be positioned in one plane - after that the adhesive can be transferred without contact. The following examples show the advantages of non-contact dispensing:

- Removal of a feed motion to the part
- Time saving through ejection of adhesive
- No contact with part (no damage)
- Even spread of adhesive topography independent of part topography and surface structure

Non-contact dispensing can be divided in two different methods:

- Jet-forming dispensing
- Dynamic drop dispensing

== Jet-forming dispensing ==
Jet-forming dispensing exists when the flow velocity of a medium at the nozzle exit is high enough that the effects of gravitation and surface tension on the separation of the fluid from the nozzle are of secondary importance. This state is characterized by the Weber number:

$$\mathrm{We} = \frac{\rho v^2 D}{\sigma}$$

where

$\rho$	: Fluid density (kg/m^{3})
$v$	: Jet velocity (m/s)
$D$	: Nozzle diameter (m)
$\sigma$	: Surface tension (N/m)

The physical border line between drop- and jet-forming is around a Weber-number of 8. At this point the dynamic pressure of the flowing medium exceeds the pressure from the surface tension of the drop, which therefore sticks to the nozzle. This transitional stage can be demonstrated at a water tap by gradually increasing the flow, going from the dropping status until a continuous water jet has formed. The Weber-number in this case is, however, clearly above 8, because of the jet exit conditions of the nozzle.

By using the Weber-number, the theoretical lower limit of the mass flow can be found for the jet-forming conditions. In actual applications, to assure a safe dispensing process, the real Weber-numbers chosen should be between 20 and 50.

For a calculated estimation of the fluid flow velocity in the nozzle, for fluids with Newtonian flow behavior, the formula for capillary fluid flow according to the Hagen–Poiseuille law has been proven.

$$Q = \frac{\Delta P \pi r^4}{8 \mu L}$$

$Q$	: Volumetric flow rate
$\Delta P$	: Pressure difference between nozzle entrance and nozzle exit
$r$	: Nozzle radius
$\mu$	: Dynamic viscosity
$L$	: Length of the nozzle

To avoid atomizing of the fluid at the nozzle exit, the fluid flow in the nozzle must be laminar, which is the case as long as the Reynolds number (Re) of the nozzle is smaller than the critical Reynolds-number of the nozzle:

$$Re < Re_{crit}$$

Reynolds-number of the nozzle:

$$Re = \frac{\rho v D}{\mu}$$

$\mu$	: Dynamic viscosity

Critical Reynolds-number of the nozzle:

$$1800 \lessapprox Re_{crit} \lessapprox 2400$$

Thus, the theoretical range of the jet-forming dispension is enclosed at its lower limit by the Weber-number and at its upper limit by the critical Reynolds-number. For practical applications, a high kinetic energy in the fluid jet is not desirable, because the jet probably would burst and spatter tiny droplets around the target point. Jet-forming dispensing systems are therefore usually operated in the area of lower Weber-numbers.

In practice, the calculation of the Weber-number becomes more complicated when fluids with additives are used, which demonstrate a non-Newtonian (i.e. thixotropic) flow behavior and therefore the viscosity during the flow through the nozzle is different.

== Dynamic drop dispensing ==
Dynamic drop dispensing is characterised by separation of a drop from the nozzle exit through a dynamic process, because the static pressure of the liquid medium is insufficient for forming a fluid jet.

A well-known example is inkjet printing. In this application, the volume of a small dispensing chamber with adjoining nozzle becomes reduced through a short impulse, whereby the ink is ejected through the nozzle. Nozzle chamber, nozzle and ink reservoir are hereby fluidically connected without any valve in between. During the dispensing process, some of the medium is also flowing in the reverse direction (back into the reservoir). The surface tension of the fluid at the nozzle exit prevents air being sucked in and fluid from exiting the nozzle when the dispensing chamber is filled up again. The principle of this process is only useful for low-viscosity fluids and this principle is not applicable with higher fluid pressures.

Ink-jet systems have the following inherent properties:

• Very small single-drop volumes are achievable (8 picolitres)
• High dispensing frequencies can be realised (some kHz)
• Low costs for mass production
• Only certain low-viscosity media are dispensable (i.e. no volatile media)
• Principally not leak-proof

For industrial production, the dispensing amounts and the range of viscosity spectra of ink-jet systems for most applications are too small. In these fields of production, specially designed valves with tappet drives of high dynamic pressure are used instead. These microdispensing systems are characterised by the following properties:

• Single drop volumes from 10 to 200 nanolitres
• Dispensing frequencies up to 100 Hz
• Dispensing accuracy < 1%
• Media viscosities up to 200 Pa·s (thixotropic)
