= Mr. Pibb =

Soft drink

- Type: Soft drink
- Manufacturer: The Coca-Cola Company
- Origin: United States
- Introduced: June 8, 1972 (as Mr. Pibb, first era); June 27, 2001 (as Pibb Xtra); October 30, 2025 (as Mr. Pibb, second era)
- Color: Caramel
- Flavor: "Kickin' cherry"
- Variants: Mr. Pibb; Mr. Pibb Zero Sugar; Mr. Pibb Thrillin' Vanilla; Mr. Pibb Punchin' Peach
- Related products: Dr Pepper; Dr. Wells; Dr Thunder

Mr. Pibb, formerly Pibb Xtra and Peppo (stylized as mr P!BB and formerly stylized as Mr. PiBB), is a soft drink created and marketed by the Coca-Cola Company. The brand competed primarily with Dr. Pepper and PepsiCo's Doc X.

As of 2026, Mr. Pibb is sold in bottles, cans, and two-liter bottles. It is available in most Coca-Cola Freestyle machines, and a zero sugar version is available.

== History ==
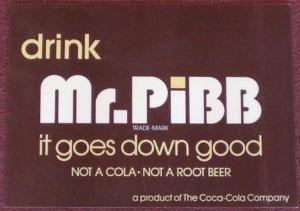
Mr. Pibb advertisement

The Coca-Cola Company introduced Peppo, marketed as a "pepper-type soda", in early 1972. The beverage, then contained to only the Memphis, Tennessee, market, drew ire from The Dr Pepper Company, who sued The Coca-Cola Company for trademark infringement in June of that year. As this litigation continued, Coca-Cola modified the Peppo formula and introduced the new Mr. Pibb to Jackson, Mississippi and Waco, Texas (the birthplace of Dr Pepper before the company moved to Dallas) in the same month. A sugar-free variety of Mr. Pibb would be introduced in late 1973. Peppo would continue to be produced in limited quantities as the case continued through August 1975, when after PepsiCo filed its own suit concerning the drink's name, Coca-Cola would agree to abandon the Peppo name and sell off the remaining stock. In 1980, Mr. Pibb was reformulated and marketed with the words "New Taste" printed prominently on the products.

In 2001, a cinnamon-forward "spicy cherry" flavor replaced the original formula in many parts of the United States, marketed as a bolder version of original Mr. Pibb. Diet Mr. Pibb would be discontinued with this rebrand, and a replacement, Pibb Zero, would only be introduced in 2005. As recently as 2020, Pibb Xtra has been marketed as a "refreshing, spicy cherry alternative to regular cola".

In October 2025, the Mr. Pibb name was restored along with a reformulation that includes more caffeine. The brand relaunch was in response to the loss of distribution rights to Dr Pepper by Reyes Coca-Cola, the bottler and distributor of Coca-Cola Company products in much of the Midwestern and Western United States.

== Variations ==
=== Standard flavors ===
Mr. Pibb was reintroduced in 2025, replacing Pibb Xtra. The rebranding also included a reformulation, with additional caffeine. Mr. Pibb Zero Sugar replaced Pibb Zero.

In early 2026, two new variants—Thrillin' Vanilla, a vanilla-flavored version, and Punchin' Peach, a peach-flavored variation—were introduced in bottles and cans regionally to complement the core lineup. They will be available nationwide in late summer 2026.

=== Coca-Cola Freestyle flavors ===
Mr. Pibb is now available in some Freestyle machines at restaurant chains that do not serve Dr Pepper or regions where Dr Pepper is not bottled by a local Coca-Cola distributor, which introduced the brand to new countries exclusively through the machines. In 2011, Pibb Xtra expanded to two new flavors: Pibb Xtra Cherry and Pibb Xtra Cherry-Vanilla. Released for Coca-Cola Freestyle machines, both new flavors were also released for Pibb Zero. Pibb Xtra Strawberry was released in 2018, along with Dr Pepper and Coca-Cola Strawberry. The Pibb Xtra Freestyle variants were replaced with Thrillin' Vanilla and Punchin' Peach in 2026.
