= Five Guys =

American fast food chain

Five Guys Enterprises, LLC

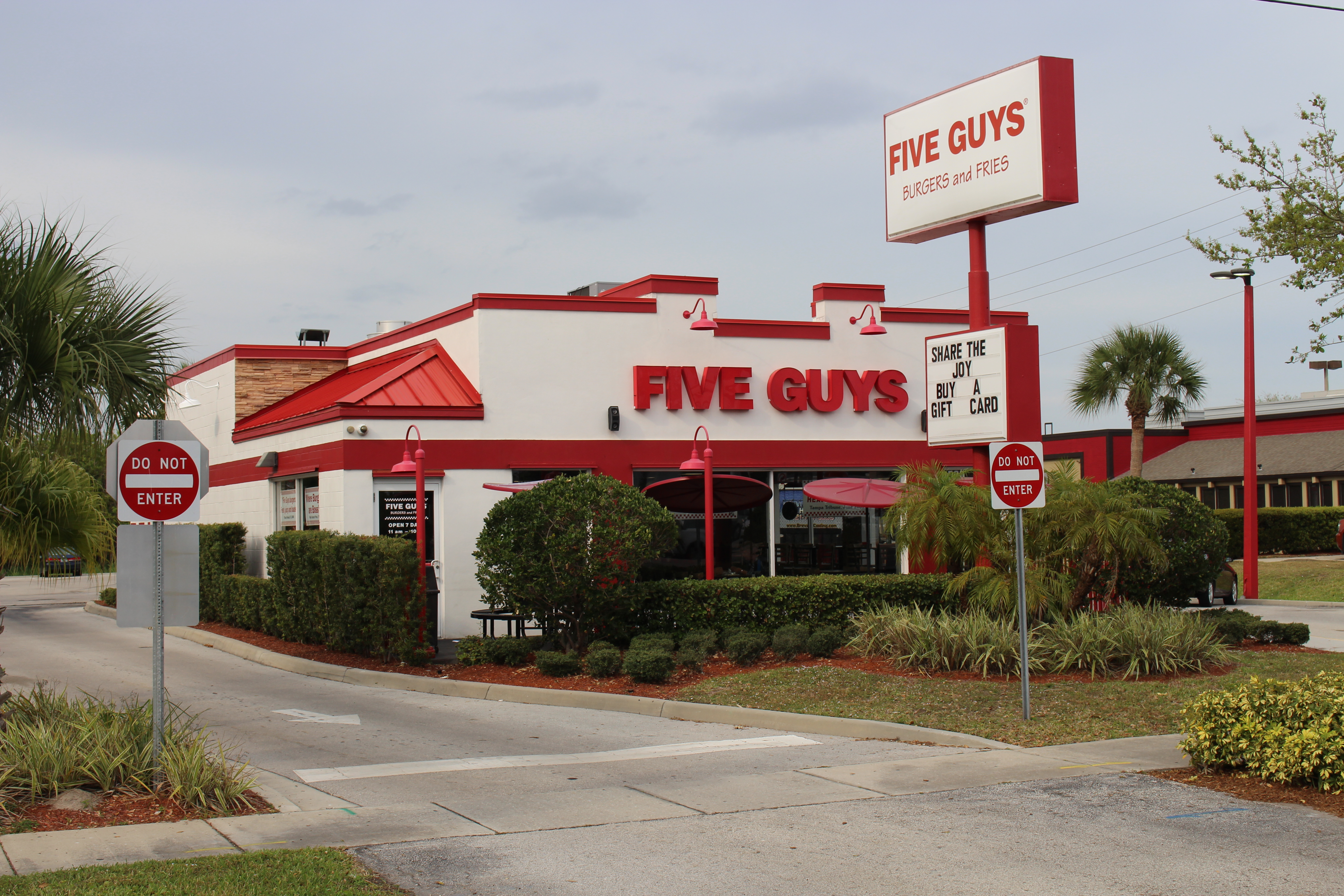
- Five Guys in Merritt Island, Florida
- Trade name: Five Guys
- Type: Private
- Industry: Restaurant
- Genre: Fast food
- Founded: 1986; 40 years ago Arlington, Virginia, United States
- Founders: Jerry Murrell, Janie Murrell
- Headquarters: Alexandria, Virginia, United States
- Number of locations: 1,700+ (2021)
- Area served: List: Australia; Austria; Bahrain; Belgium; Canada; China; Czech Republic; France; Germany; Hong Kong; Republic of Ireland; Kuwait; Netherlands; Italy; Luxembourg; Macau; Malaysia; Qatar; Saudi Arabia; Singapore; South Korea; Spain; Sweden; Switzerland; United Arab Emirates; United Kingdom; United States
- Key people: Jerry Murrell, Jim Murrell, Matt Murrell, Chad Murrell, Ben Murrell, Tyler Murrell
- Products: Hamburgers, french fries, hot dogs, soft drinks, milkshakes
- Revenue: ▲US$2.347 billion (2023)
- Owner: Murrell family
- Number of employees: 5,000 (2021)
- Website: fiveguys.com

Five Guys Enterprises, LLC (doing business as Five Guys Burgers and Fries and Five Guys) is an American multinational fast casual restaurant chain focused on hamburgers, hot dogs, and french fries. It is headquartered in Alexandria, Virginia.

The first Five Guys restaurant opened in 1986 in Arlington County, Virginia. By 2001, there were five locations in the Washington, D.C., metro area. In early 2003, Five Guys began franchising, beginning a period of rapid expansion. In a year and a half, permits had been sold for over 300 franchised locations. As of 2026, Five Guys had over 1,900 locations open worldwide. It was the fastest-growing fast food chain in the United States, with a 32.8% sales increase from 2010 to 2011.

== History ==
=== Founding ===
Five Guys was founded in 1986 by Janie and Jerry Murrell. Jerry and the couple's sons Jim, Matt, Chad, and Ben were the original "Five Guys". The Murrells had a fifth son, Tyler, two years later. Today, all five sons, the current "Five Guys", are involved in the business: Matt and Jim travel the United States visiting stores, Chad oversees training, Ben selects the franchisees, and Tyler runs the bakery.

The first Five Guys was in Arlington's Westmont Shopping Center. Buns were baked in the same center by Brenner's Bakery. This location closed, in favor of another in Alexandria, Virginia, at the intersection of King and North Beauregard Streets, which closed on September 21, 2013.

Map of countries with Five Guys locations

More followed in Old Town Alexandria and Springfield, Virginia, making five locations open by 2001.

=== Domestic expansion ===
Their success encouraged the Murrells to franchise their concept the following year, engaging Fransmart, a franchise sales organization. Former American football player Mark Moseley, who had gone to work for Fransmart after his football career, played a key role in Five Guys' expansion and went on to become the company's director of franchise development after it ended its business relationship with Fransmart. In early 2003, the chain began franchising, opening the doors to rapid expansion which caught the attention of national restaurant trade organizations and the national press. The expansion started in Virginia and Maryland, and by the end of 2004, over 300 units were in development through the Northeast. Over the next few years, the chain rapidly expanded across the entire United States and into Canada, reaching over 1,000 locations by 2012.

Five Guys Enterprises has several affiliated companies that are not part of a consolidated group, but are under common ownership. Five Guys Operations was founded in 2012, Five Guys Holdings was founded in 2007. Five Guys Foods UK Limited was incorporated on March 12, 2013. FGE International, FGO International BV, and FG Coöperatief U.A. are based in Amsterdam. FGH International C.V. is located in Bermuda.

Five Guys had a 39,900-square-foot (3,710 m^{2}) headquarters in Lorton, Virginia, overlooking the Occoquan and Potomac Rivers, that was specially designed to convey the corporate brand. According to the architect, "The lobby mimics the typical Five Guys restaurant with red and white tile, tall tables, Freestyle Coke machine and signature peanut boxes." In 2023, they moved their headquarters to a new location in Alexandria, Virginia.

In 2020, the first Five Guys location with a drive-through window opened in Surfside Beach, South Carolina. The franchisee retained it from the former business in the building in light of COVID-19 pandemic safe practices.

=== International locations ===
The first location outside of North America opened in the United Kingdom on July 4, 2013, in London on Long Acre in Covent Garden. The chain now has more than 170 restaurants in the United Kingdom.

In 2017, Five Guys opened its first restaurants in Germany, with a branch in Frankfurt and another in Essen.

Five Guys opened its first Korean store in Gangnam, Seoul in 2023, with a countdown shout, and expanded to four branches in Seoul.

In 2021, Five Guys opened their first location in Australia. The chain also has plans to expand into New Zealand.

In 2025, Five Guys announced that it would open their first restaurant in Denmark, at Fisketorvet, a shopping mall in Copenhagen.

In 2026, the number of stores per country was as follows:

- Asia: United Arab Emirates (17), Saudi Arabia (13), Kuwait (7), South Korea (9), Hong Kong (8), China (5), Bahrain (4), Malaysia (3), Macau (3), Qatar (3), Singapore (2).
- Europe: United Kingdom (178), Spain (44), France (41), Germany (35), Italy (10), Netherlands (4), Ireland (4), Switzerland (4), Sweden (3), Austria (2), Belgium (2), Denmark (2), Luxembourg (1), Czech Republic (1).
- North America: United States (1,517), Canada (72).
- Oceania: Australia (5).

== Menu ==
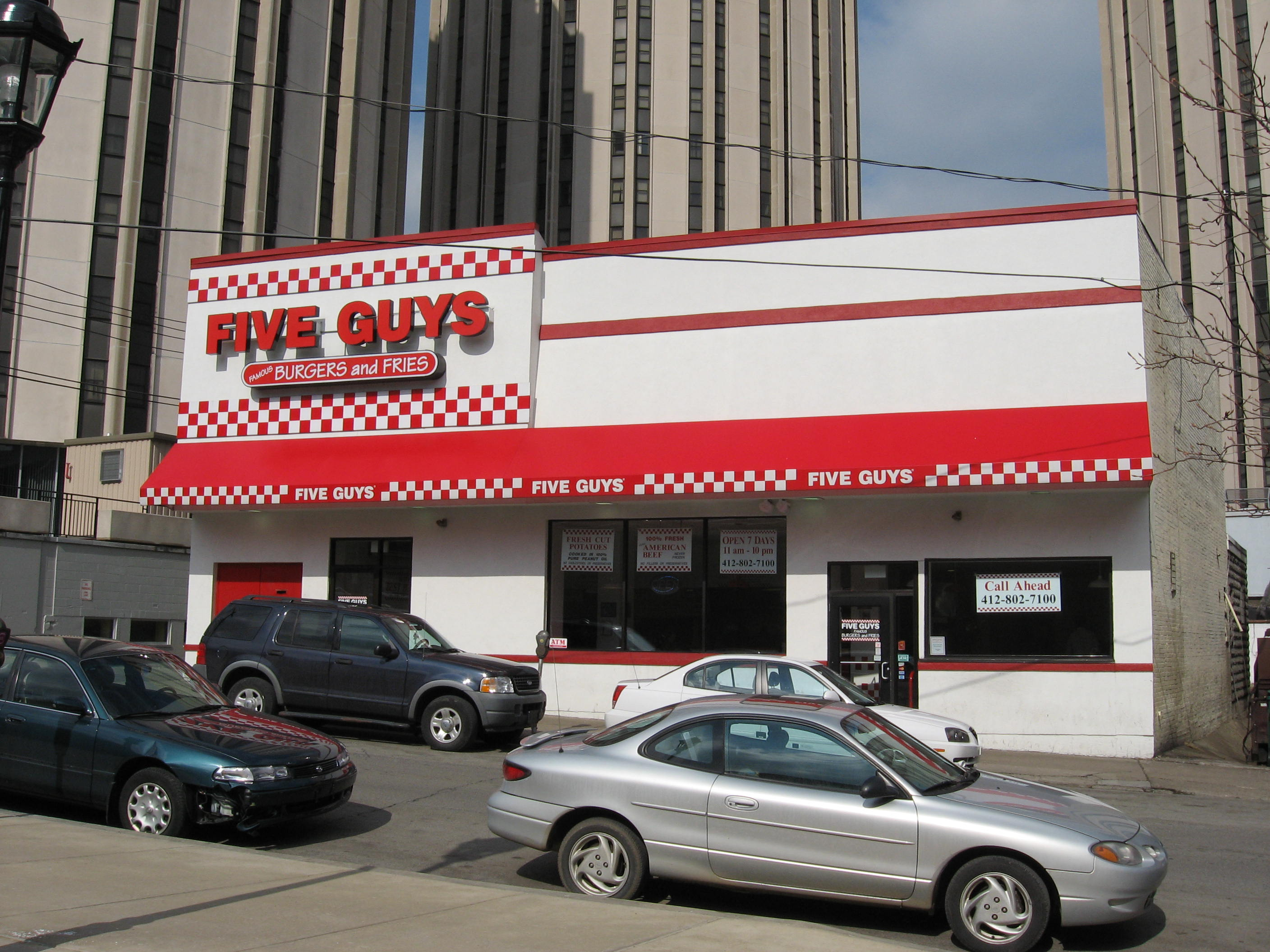
A Five Guys restaurant in Pittsburgh, Pennsylvania

The Five Guys menu focuses on hamburgers offered with Kraft American cheese or applewood-smoked bacon and kosher style hot dogs (Hebrew National all-beef franks), as well as grilled cheese, BLT and vegetable sandwiches. Five Guys uses buns that are sweeter and "eggier" than normal buns. The hamburgers come in two sizes: regular (two patties) and little (one patty). Customers may select from 15 toppings at no charge. Fresh-cut french fries are the sole side item, available salted only in "Five Guys style" or seasoned "Cajun style". Conventionally, Five Guys employees are directed to give customers an extra scoop of fries for free when they order. The rationale was to persuade the customer that they were getting a good deal by giving them more fries than they'd paid for. However, the extras were already accounted for in the initial pricing.

Complimentary roasted in-shell peanuts are offered for on-site consumption at most locations, with signage alerting potential customers who may have a peanut allergy; for these allergen reasons, customers are not allowed to take peanuts off-site.

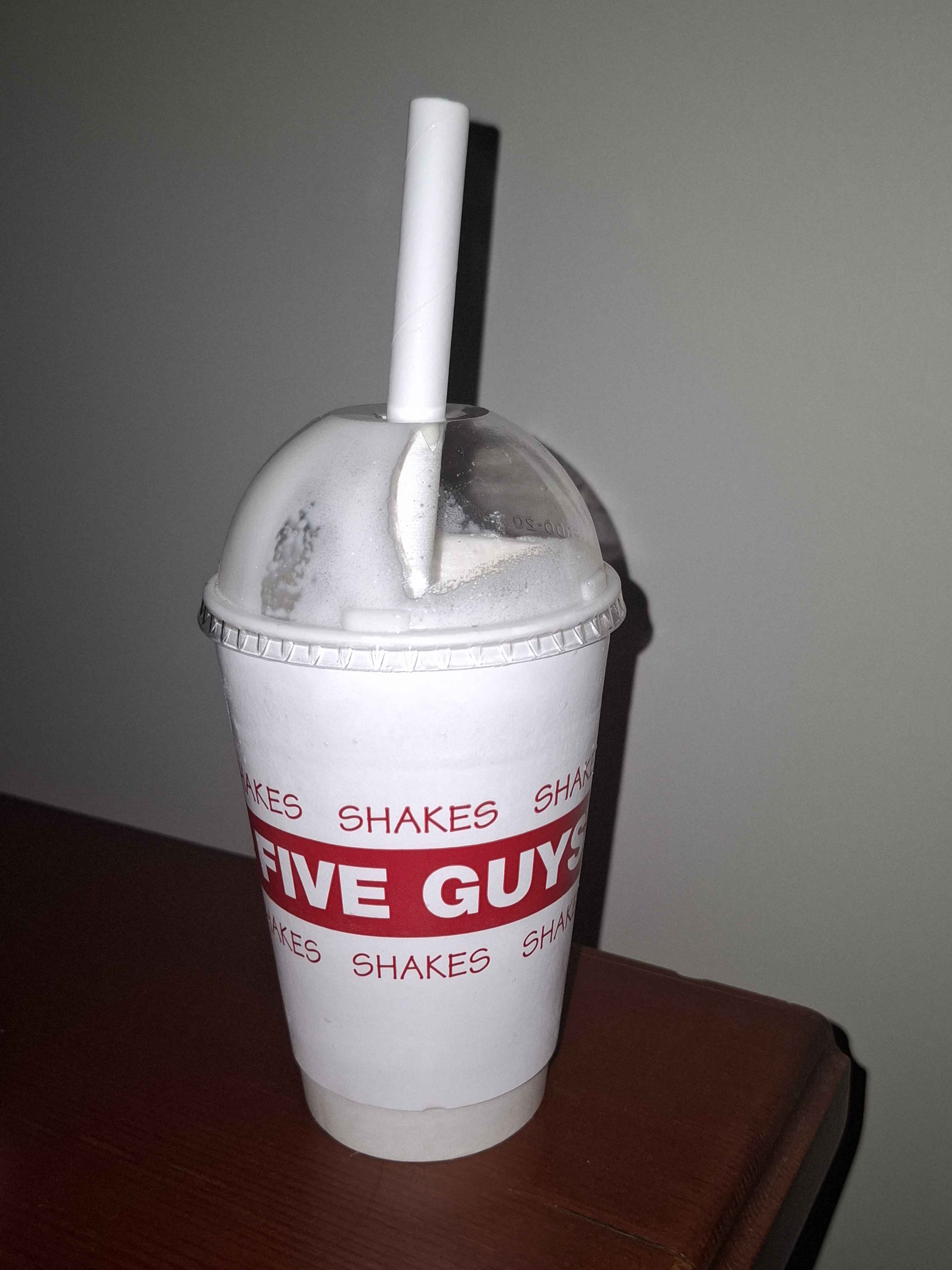
A vanilla Milkshake from Five Guys, a product introduced in a menu refresh in 2014

Since 2014, the chain also sells milkshakes in the traditional vanilla, chocolate, and strawberry flavors, which can also be ordered with the customer's choice of up to 10 free toppings mixed in, ranging from Oreo cookies to bacon.

Five Guys experimented with offering coffee, but this was discontinued due to quality concerns. Like other breakfast items, such as the BLT sandwich and bacon, egg and cheese sandwich, coffee is currently only offered in Five Guys's airport locations and its location near McPherson Square station.

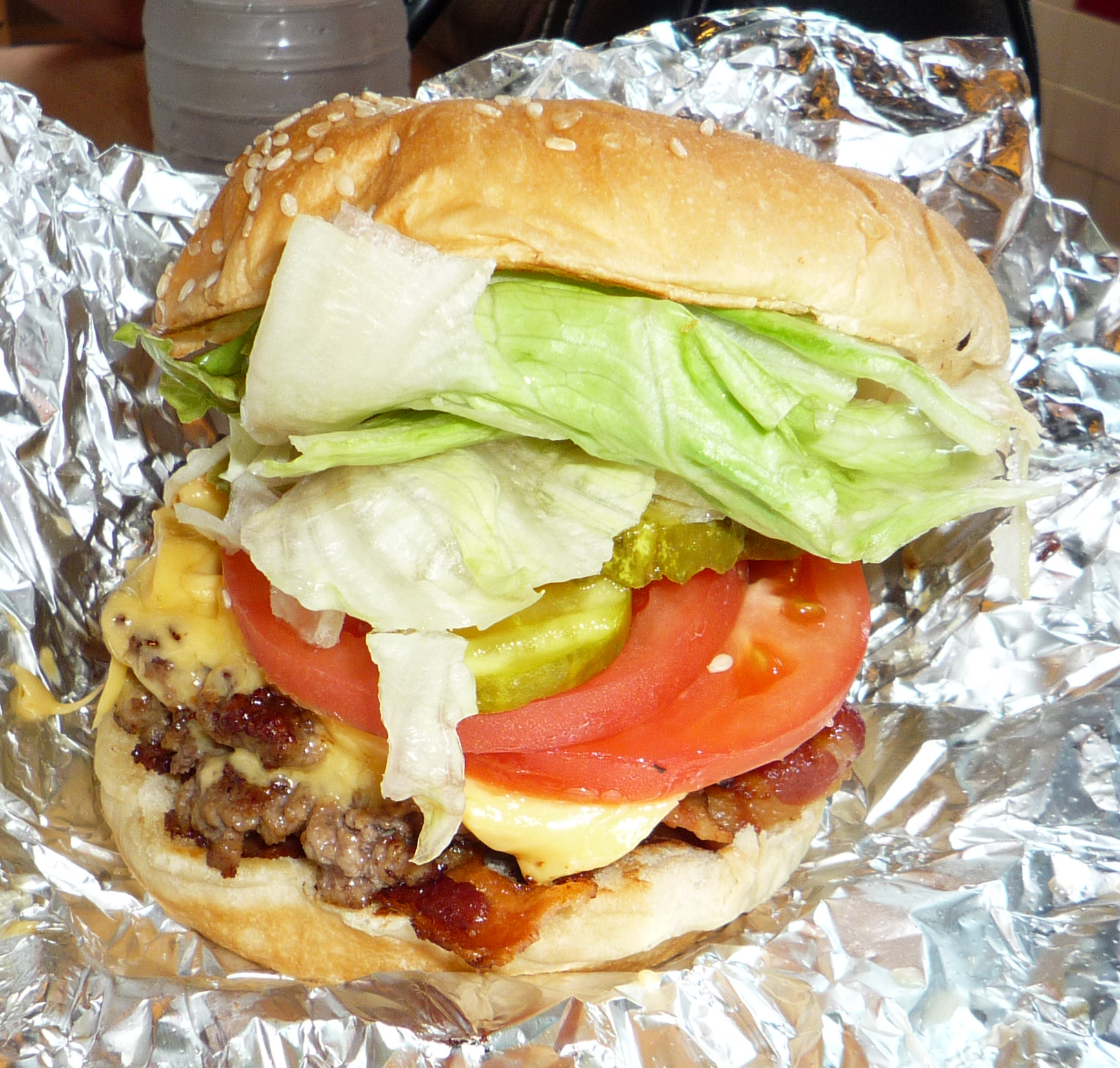
A Five Guys bacon cheeseburger

Bags of potatoes are sometimes stacked in customer spaces due to an occasional lack of storage space, or, in some franchises, for aesthetic reasons. Restaurants are decorated with white and red checkered tile throughout and generally use wooden tables along with counter-high level seating.

== Reception ==
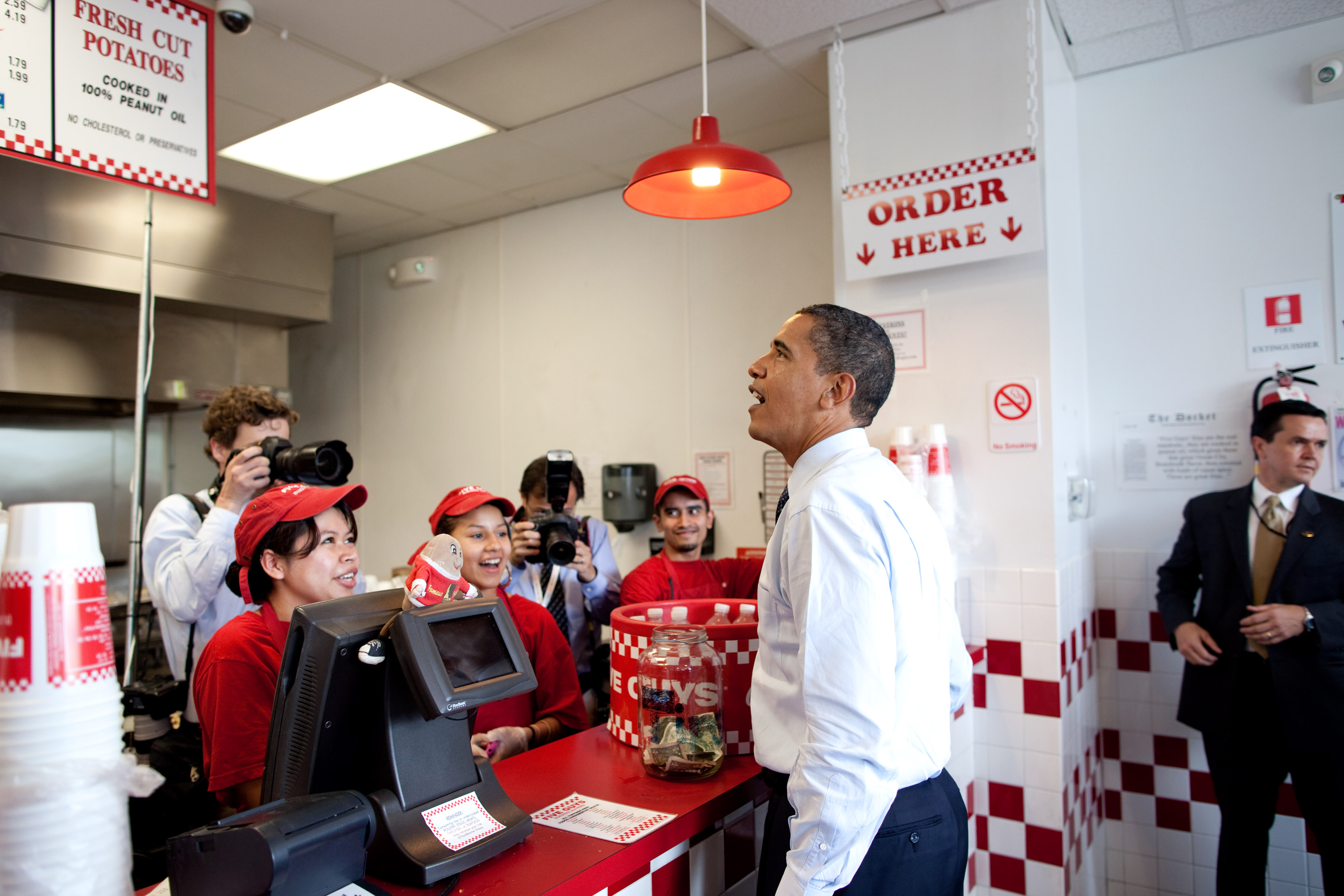
Barack Obama orders lunch at Five Guys in Washington, D.C., 2009

Former US President Barack Obama is reportedly a fan, buying lunch for himself and his colleagues at the Washington Five Guys branch in 2011.

Since franchising, the company has appeared in multiple "best of" lists. The chain has something of a cult following, and remarkable brand loyalty. Five Guys has been rated one of the most talked-about burger brands online.

As Five Guys continued to expand into the US West Coast, comparisons were made with In-N-Out Burger, another generally similar fast food chain. Comparing the two chains in 2011, Sharon Bernstein, writing in the Los Angeles Times, noted that Five Guys' menu items are generally more expensive than In-N-Out's, they lack drive-throughs that In-N-Out is famous for, and are most often found inside shopping malls. Bernstein conceded however, that by pricing its products higher, offering bigger burgers and building larger dining rooms, Five Guys could capitalize on the then-recent trend of mid-level places that offer more expensive products than fast food but cheaper than fancy restaurants.

In 2011, Five Guys was ranked first in "Fast Food – Large Chains" and "Best Burger" in Zagat's annual Fast Food Survey. In 2012, Market Force Information, Inc. polled 7,600 fast-food consumers, and Five Guys ranked No. 1 in food quality and taste, service, cleanliness, and atmosphere. In 2016, Five Guys was ranked first in the burger, steak, chicken and grill category of a Market Force UK survey.

Consumer sentiment began to turn after Five Guys prices began increasing in the 2020s, with locations raising prices by as much as 40% between 2021 and 2022, with the cost of a burger, fries, and a drink cresting at $20. A 2024 survey of large chains ranked Five Guys as the second-most expensive fast food hamburger restaurant in the country behind Shake Shack.
