= Coca-Cola Freestyle =

Touch screen soda fountain

- Type: Touch screen soda fountain
- Inception: July 2009; 17 years ago
- Manufacturer: Coca-Cola
- Available: Yes
- Website: http://www.coca-colafreestyle.com/

Coca-Cola Freestyle is a touch screen soda fountain distributed and run by the Coca-Cola Company. First launched in July 2009, the machine features over 165 different Coca-Cola drink products, as well as custom flavors, allowing users to select from mixtures of flavors of Coca-Cola branded products which are then individually dispensed.

The machines are located in various retail locations in the United States and in a number of other countries around the world, such as in chain restaurants, cinemas, resorts, and in Royal Caribbean ships.

In 2014, Pepsi launched a competing, similar machine, the Pepsi Spire.

== Design ==
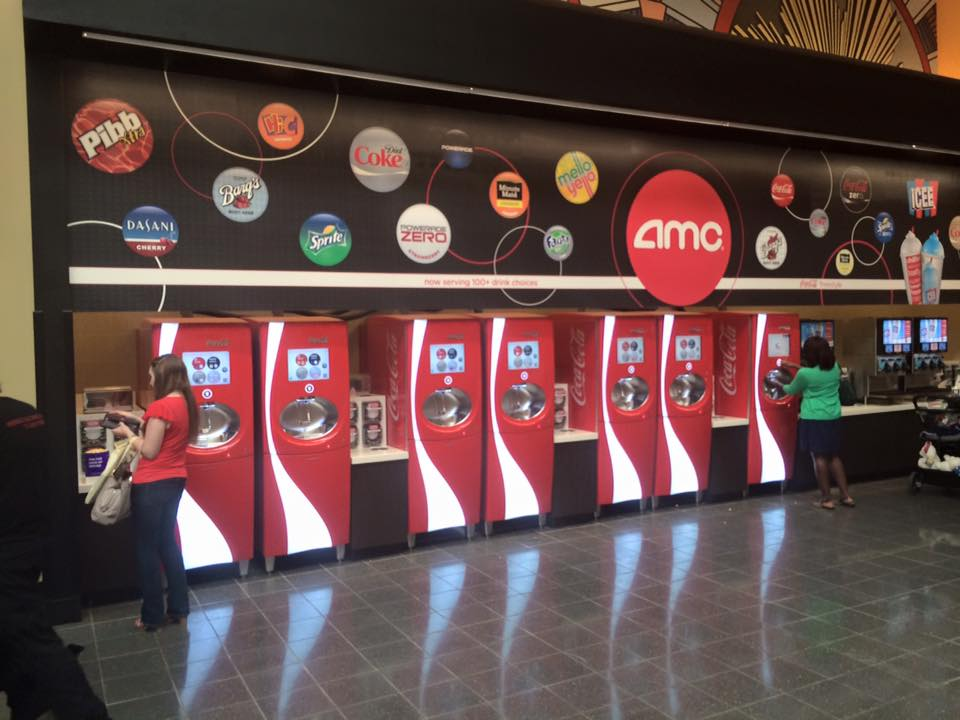
Coke Freestyle machines at the AMC Theatres in the Palisades Center mall, New York, US

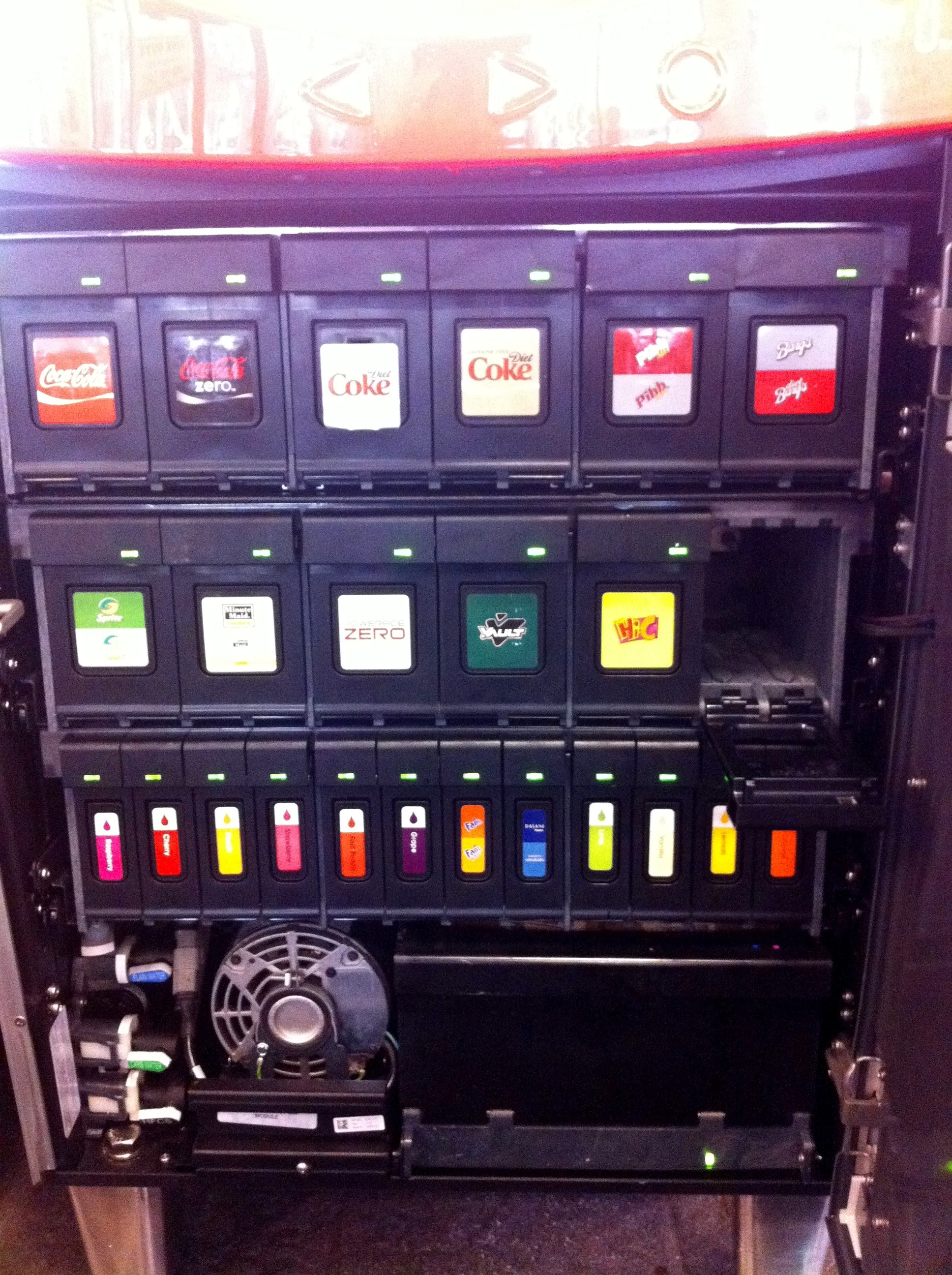
Panel of Freestyle cartridges in the machine

The cabinetry was designed by the Italian automotive design firm Pininfarina, via their Pininfarina Extra industrial and product design subsidiary. The Freestyle's beverage dispensing technology was designed by Dean Kamen, the inventor of the Segway, in return for Coca-Cola distributing his Slingshot water purification system.

The technologies used in the machines include microdispensing and Frigidaire's proprietary PurePour technology. Both technologies were originally developed to deliver precise drug doses. One Freestyle unit with a similar footprint to a current vending machine can dispense 126 kinds of carbonated and non-carbonated beverages. Microdosing blends one or more concentrated ingredients stored in 46 US fl oz (1.36 L) packets with water and sweetener at the point where the beverage is dispensed, thus avoiding the use of traditional 5 US gal (18.9 L) boxes of syrup (also known as a bag-in-a-box). Cartridges store concentrated ingredients in the dispenser cabinet and are RFID enabled. The machine uses RFID chips to detect its supplies and to radio resupplying needs to other units.

== History ==
=== Launch ===
Testing began in Utah, Southern California, and Georgia in July 2009 with 60+ locations around America planned by the end of that summer. Test locations around Coca-Cola's home city of Atlanta included the World of Coca-Cola, AMC Theatres Southlake Pavilion 24 and Parkway Point 15, and area food chains, including Willy's Mexicana Grill.

Coca-Cola deployed the machines to 500 more locations in the United States in June 2010, followed by deployment to some universities in the United States. Deployment has continued in select locations of restaurant chains such as Wingstop, Zaxby's, Wawa, Taco Time Northwest, Togo's, Roy Rogers, Davanni's, PDQ Dairy Queen, Fuddruckers, Five Guys, Kelly's Roast Beef,Firehouse Subs, Wendy's, Jack in the Box, Carl's Jr./Hardee's, Beef O'Brady's, Miami Grill, Hess Express, Jason's Deli, White Castle, Moe's Southwest Grill, Noodles & Company, Popeyes, Raising Cane's, Steak 'n Shake, Captain D's, Chili's, AMC Theatres, Cracker Barrel, Six Flags, Blaze Pizza, McDonald's, Burger King and BurgerFi. Burger King announced in December 2011 that it plans to implement the Freestyle system in its 850 company-owned restaurants in the U.S. by early-to-mid 2012, and was encouraging its franchisees to follow suit.

=== Developments ===
In February 2015, the company updated their system to divide drinks into four different categories, including a full selection, fruit-flavored mixes, caffeine-free drinks and those with low- or zero-calorie formulations.

In 2018, Coca-Cola unveiled a new iteration of Freestyle (9100) that would begin deployment in 2019, with a 24-inch touchscreen, Bluetooth support to connect with a new, accompanying mobile app for consumers, and new hardware features intended for future capabilities and beverage options.

=== Deployment in other countries ===
The company have also launched and deployed Coca-Cola Freestyle machines in many other countries, mainly in Europe. However, the selection of brands available may differ, and they may include real sugar unlike their US versions which use high-fructose corn syrup. Freestyle launched in a limited trial in June 2012 in Great Britain, in association with Burger King. In Germany it began limited trials in 2015 and rolled out further by 2020. It launched in France in July 2016, in association with Five Guys. It was launched in Singapore in September 2017 the first one in a retail store in Our Tampines Hub. They launched in Denmark in February 2020. In 2021 Coca-Cola Europacific Partners trialled a new Compact Freestyle machine, initially in France and Belgium and later in Great Britain. These machines are smaller compared to the regular Freestyle.

== Products ==
Customers choose a base product, which they can supplement with additional flavoring. Diet and Zero products remain low or no calories even with flavorings added. The machines include flavors not previously available to the markets served by the machines (for example Orange in the US). Customers may also download an app and create their own custom mixes with up to three different base products and three different flavor shots, which the fountain pours by scanning a QR code.

=== Flavors ===
Base product	Regular	Cherry	Cherry Vanilla	Lemon	Lime	Orange	Vanilla	Ginger Lemon	Ginger Lime	Grape	Peach	Strawberry	Fruit Punch	Citrus Twist	Strawberry Orange	Pink Lemonade	Orange Vanilla	Pineapple	Blueberry	Raspberry	Tropical Punch
Coca-Cola (Note: Coca-Cola additional flavors also include creme soda and tropical)	Yes	Yes	Yes	Yes	Yes	Yes	Yes	Yes	No	No	Yes	No	No	No	No	No	No	No	No	Yes	No
Diet Coke	Yes	Yes	Yes	Yes	Yes	Yes	Yes	Yes	Yes	Yes	No	No	No	No	No	No	No	No	No	Yes	No
Coca-Cola Zero Sugar (Note: Coca-Cola Zero Sugar additional flavors also include creme soda and tropical)	Yes	Yes	Yes	Yes	Yes	Yes	Yes	Yes	No	No	Yes	No	No	No	No	No	No	No	No	Yes	No
Caffeine Free Diet Coca-Cola	Yes	Yes	Yes	Yes	Yes	Yes	Yes	Yes	Yes	Yes	No	No	No	No	No	No	No	No	No	Yes	No
Sprite (Note: Sprite additional flavors also include Lymonade (lemonade), blueberry pomegranate, and ginger)	Yes	Yes	No	No	No	Yes	Yes	Yes	No	No	Yes	Yes	Yes	No	No	No	No	Yes	No	Yes	Yes
Sprite Zero (Note: Sprite Zero additional flavors also include Lymonade (lemonade))	Yes	Yes	No	No	No	Yes	Yes	Yes	No	No	Yes	Yes	Yes	No	No	No	No	Yes	No	Yes	Yes
Pibb Xtra	Yes	Yes	Yes	No	No	No	Yes	No	No	No	No	No	Yes	No	No	No	No	No	No	No	No
Barq's Root Beer	Yes	No	No	No	No	No	Yes	No	No	No	No	No	No	No	No	No	No	No	No	No	No
Diet Barq's Root Beer	Yes	No	No	No	No	No	Yes	No	No	No	No	No	No	No	No	No	No	No	No	No	No
Fanta products	—N/a	Yes	Yes	Yes (intl. only)	Yes	Yes	Yes	Yes	No	No	Yes	Yes	Yes	Yes	Yes	No	No	No	No	Yes	Yes
Fanta Zero products	—N/a	Yes	Yes	Yes (intl. only)	Yes	Yes	Yes	Yes	No	No	Yes	Yes	Yes	Yes	Yes	No	No	No	No	Yes	Yes
Pibb Zero	Yes	Yes	Yes	No	No	No	Yes	No	No	No	No	No	Yes	No	No	No	No	No	No	No	No
Dr Pepper	Yes	Yes	Yes	No	No	No	Yes	No	No	No	No	No	Yes	No	No	No	No	No	No	No	No
Diet Dr Pepper	Yes	Yes	Yes	No	No	No	Yes	No	No	No	No	No	Yes	No	No	No	No	No	No	No	No
Mello Yello	Yes	Yes	No	No	Yes (limeade)	Yes	No	No	No	No	No	Yes	No	No	No	Yes	Yes	Yes	No	No	No
Mello Yello Zero	Yes	Yes	No	No	Yes (limeade)	Yes	No	No	No	No	No	Yes	No	No	No	Yes	Yes	Yes	No	No	No
Vitaminwater (Note: Vitaminwater additional flavors also include strawberry citrus and tropical punch)	—N/a	No	No	Yes	No	Yes	Yes	No	No	No	No	Yes	No	No	No	No	No	No	Yes	No	No
Fuze tea products (Note: Fuze additional flavors also include sweet and with lemonade)	—N/a	No	No	Yes	Yes	No	Yes	No	No	No	No	Yes	Yes	No	No	No	Yes	No	No	No	No
Diet Fuze tea / Fuze tea Zero products (Note: Diet Fuze / Fuze Zero additional flavors also include sweet, unsweetened and with lemonade)	—N/a	No	No	Yes	Yes	No	Yes	No	No	No	No	Yes	Yes	No	No	No	Yes	No	No	No	No
Hi-C (Note: Hi-C additional flavors also include raspberry lime)	—N/a	Yes	No	Yes	Yes (raspberry lime)	Yes	No	No	No	Yes	Yes	Yes	Yes	Yes	Yes	Yes	No	Yes	No	Yes	Yes
Seagram's Ginger Ale	Yes	Yes	No	No	Yes	Yes	Yes	Yes	No	No	No	No	No	No	No	No	No	No	No	No	No
Seagram's Diet Ginger Ale	Yes	Yes	No	No	Yes	Yes	Yes	Yes	No	No	No	No	No	No	No	No	No	No	No	No	No
Barq's Cream Soda	Yes	No	No	No	No	Yes	Yes	No	No	No	No	Yes	Yes	No	No	No	No	No	No	No	No
Diet Barq's Cream Soda	Yes	No	No	No	No	Yes	Yes	No	No	No	No	Yes	Yes	No	No	No	No	No	No	No	No
Minute Maid Sparkling Drinks (Note: Minute Maid additional flavors also include tropical citrus)	No	Yes	No	Yes	Yes	No	No	No	No	No	No	Yes	Yes	Yes	No	No	No	No	No	No	No
Minute Maid Lemonade	No	Yes	No	Yes	Yes (lemon lime)	Yes	Yes	No	No	No	No	Yes	Yes	No	No	No	No	No	Yes	No	No
Minute Maid Light Lemonade	No	Yes	No	Yes	Yes (lemon lime)	Yes	Yes	No	No	No	No	Yes	Yes	No	No	No	No	No	Yes	No	No
Powerade	Yes (berry – intl. only)	Yes	No	Yes	Yes	Yes	Yes	No	No	No	Yes	No	Yes	Yes	No	No	No	No	No	No	No
Powerade Zero	Yes (berry – intl. only)	Yes	No	Yes	Yes	Yes	Yes	No	No	No	Yes	No	Yes	Yes	No	No	No	No	No	Yes	No
Minute Maid Drinks (Note: Minute Maid additional flavors also include cherry limeade and mixed berry)	No	No	No	No	Yes (limeade)	Yes	No	No	No	No	Yes	Yes	No	Yes	No	No	No	No	No	No	No
Minute Maid Light Drinks	No	No	No	No	Yes (limeade)	Yes	No	No	No	No	Yes	Yes	No	Yes	No	No	No	No	No	No	No
Dasani (flavored water)	No	Yes	No	Yes	Yes	Yes	Yes	No	No	No	Yes	Yes	Yes	No	No	No	No	No	No	No	No
Dasani Sparkling	Yes	No	No	No	Yes (lemon lime)	No	No	No	No	No	No	No	No	No	No	No	No	No	No	No	No
Surge	Yes	Yes	No	No	No	No	Yes	No	No	Yes	No	No	No	No	No	No	No	No	No	No	No
Surge Zero Sugar	Yes	No	No	No	No	No	No	No	No	No	No	No	No	No	No	No	No	No	No	No	No

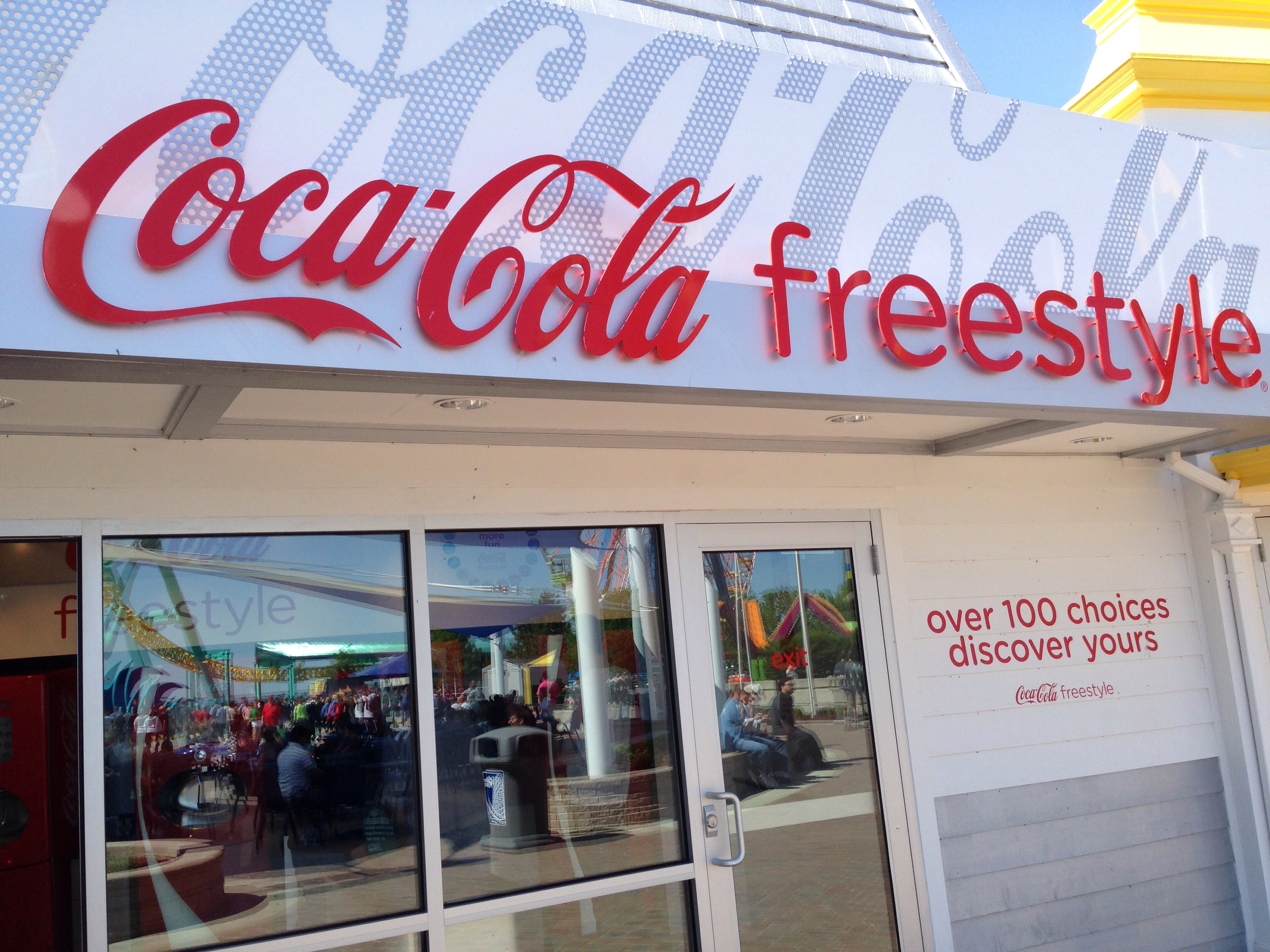
Coca-Cola Freestyle stand at Cedar Point amusement park

=== Chain and location-specific Flavors ===
Since 2010, Dr Pepper and its Diet counterpart are served instead of Pibb Xtra/Pibb Zero in areas where Dr Pepper is bottled by a local Coca-Cola distributor or at locations with separate fountain contracts to serve Dr Pepper.

When Freestyle machines were added to Firehouse Subs locations in 2011, the chain's signature Cherry Lime-Aid was included as an option; marking the first time a chain's signature drink was available in a Freestyle machine. Light and Zero options are also available.

In May 2013, Freestyle machines located in the "Antarctica" themed area at SeaWorld Orlando added an exclusive vanilla-flavored freestyle flavor called "South Pole Chill".

In May 2014, Freestyle machines at Moe's Southwest Grill locations added a vanilla/peach-flavored drink called "Vanilla at Peachtree". The chain added a second exclusive drink called Moe-Rita in May 2017, described as combining "limeade, lemonade, orange and original flavors for a refreshing margarita-inspired sip".

Machines at Wendy's locations have many unique and exclusive beverages. Examples include a range of cream soda drinks named after founder Dave Thomas, Fruit Punch varieties of Sprite and Fanta, and a re-release of Sprite Remix Aruba Jam in 2024.

Since 2018, machines at select Burger King franchisees have Surge as an available option. It is available in Cherry, Vanilla, Grape, and Zero Sugar varieties.

Machines on Royal Caribbean cruise ships added a Berry-flavored Sprite variety called "Royal Berry Blast" in October 2019, to celebrate the cruise line's 50th anniversary.

Machines in the University of South Florida campus added an exclusive Fanta variety called "Rocky's Refresher" in 2023. This drink is a pre-mixed combination of Fanta Lime, Sprite and Minute Maid Limeade.

Machines at the Universal Orlando Resort offer several Secret Menu flavors depending on the location.

Recently, machines at AMC Theatres locations alongside other movie theater chains have offered pre-assigned combinations based on films such as Top Gun Maverick, Deadpool & Wolverine, Beetlejuice Beetlejuice and Wicked.

In mid-2024 Peace Iced Tea made its debut on Freestyle machines, replacing Fuse iced tea.

== See also ==
- Pepsi Spire
