= Pepsi Spire =

Touch screen soda fountain

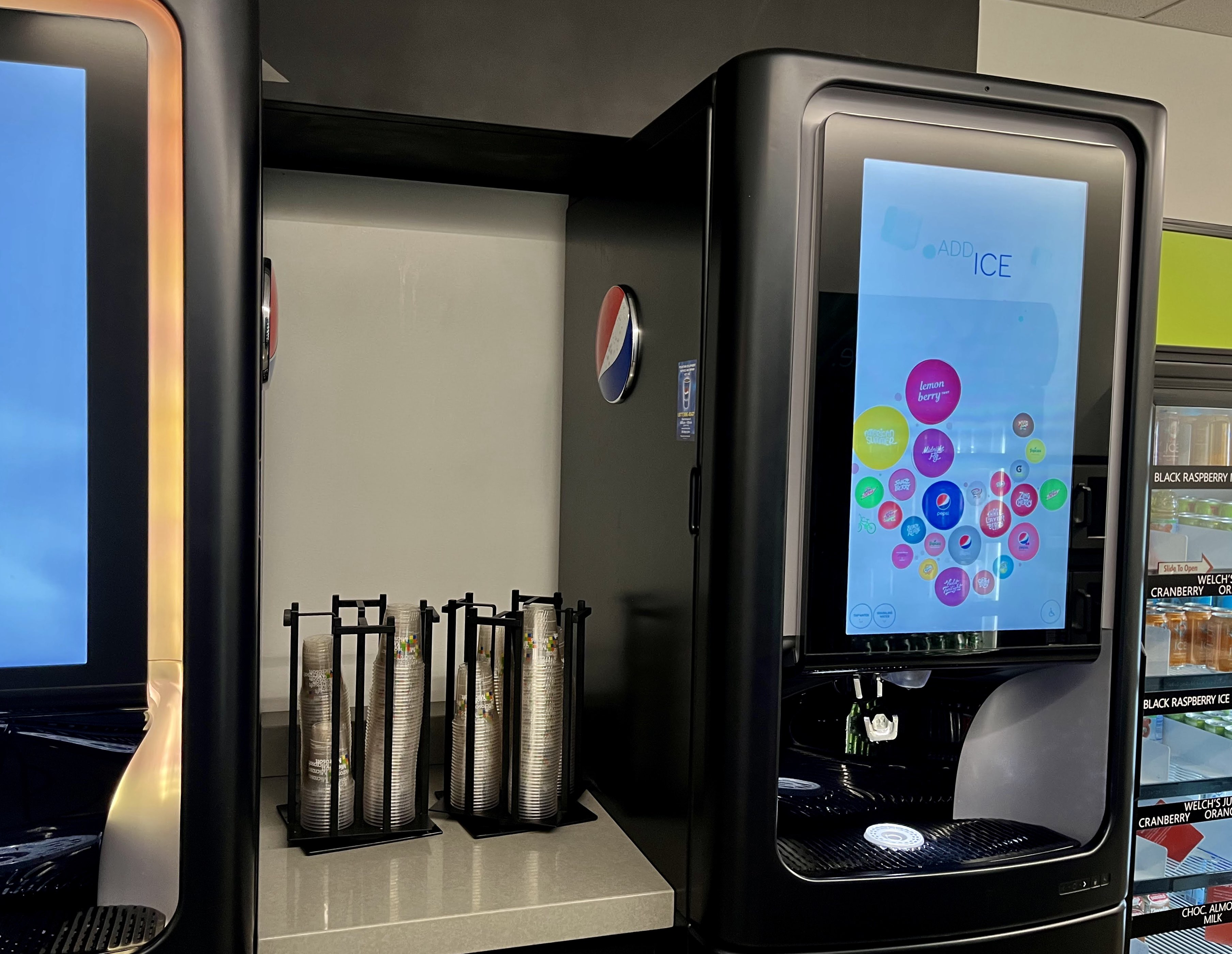
A pair of Pepsi Spire machines installed on the Microsoft Redmond campus.

Pepsi Spire is a touch screen soda fountain introduced by PepsiCo in 2014. The Spire's main competitor is the Coca-Cola Freestyle. Currently, Spire is available to retailers in two models, 2.0 and 5.0. It was designed by the Japanese machinery company Mitsubishi Heavy Industries.

== History ==
The Spire was first unveiled at the National Restaurant Association trade show in May 2014.

== Choices ==
The Spire has up to eight flavor options, depending on retailer selection: Cherry, Vanilla, Strawberry, Lemon, Raspberry, Lime, Grape and Peach.

Pepsi also markets their major brands for the machine, including:

- Pepsi
- Diet Pepsi
- Pepsi Zero Sugar (Pepsi Max outside the United States and Canada)
- Sierra Mist/Starry (7 Up outside the United States)
- Crush (Tango outside of the United States and Canada)
- Gatorade G2 Fruit Punch
- Dole Kiwi Cocktail
- Tropicana Juices & Lemonade (Brisk Lemonade outside United States)
- Mountain Dew
- Diet Mountain Dew
- Dr Pepper
- Diet Dr Pepper
- Mug Root Beer
- Diet Mug Root Beer
- Schweppes
- Brisk Iced Tea brands
- Manzanita Sol
- SoBe Lifewater

Dole Kiwi Cocktail and all Dr Pepper brands are not available at Pepsi Spire soda fountains in the United States, primarily for the fact that they’re present in Coca-Cola Freestyle fountains

== Locations ==
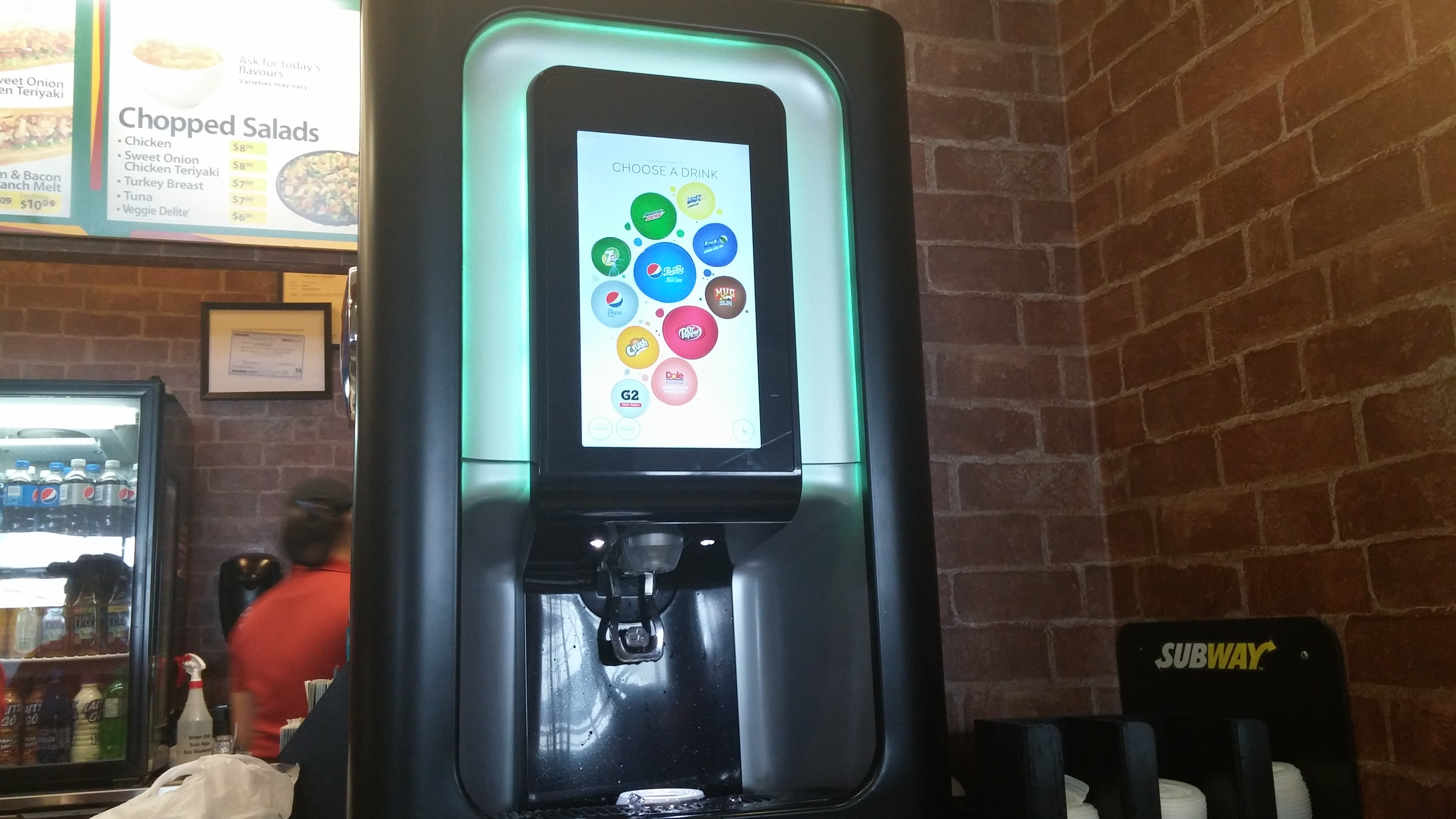
A Pepsi Spire machine at a Subway at Kingsway Mall in Edmonton in 2016.

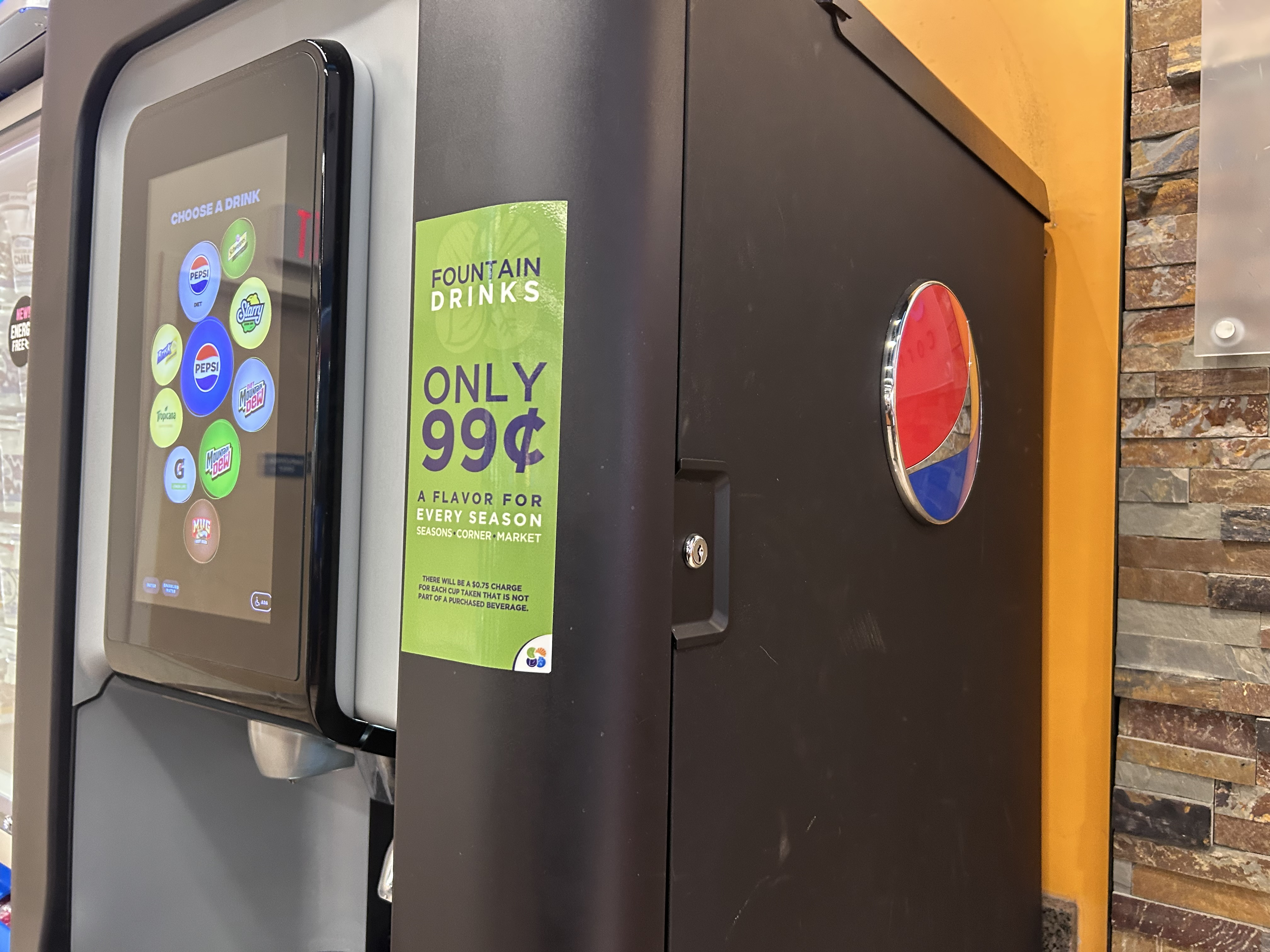
A Pepsi Spire fountain inside a Seasons Corner Market store in West Greenwich, RI, USA

Countries that have Pepsi Spire soda fountains include the United States, Canada, Switzerland, the United Kingdom, Ireland and Iran. There is no exact information on how many there are at the moment. It has also been used in the following, but may not be anymore and may have only been in limited test runs:

Many Subway restaurants use Pepsi Spire machines in different countries.

It is also at Panda Express, Shippensburg University of Pennsylvania, Muhlenberg College, University of Wisconsin–Oshkosh, Northern Arizona University, DePaul University, New Jersey Institute of Technology, Virginia Commonwealth University, certain gas stations such as Seasons, and Hersheypark.

== See also ==
- Coca-Cola Freestyle
