= Solo (Norwegian soft drink) =

Orange-flavoured soft drink from Norway

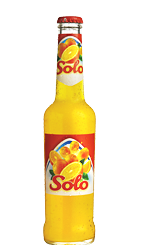
Solo glass bottle

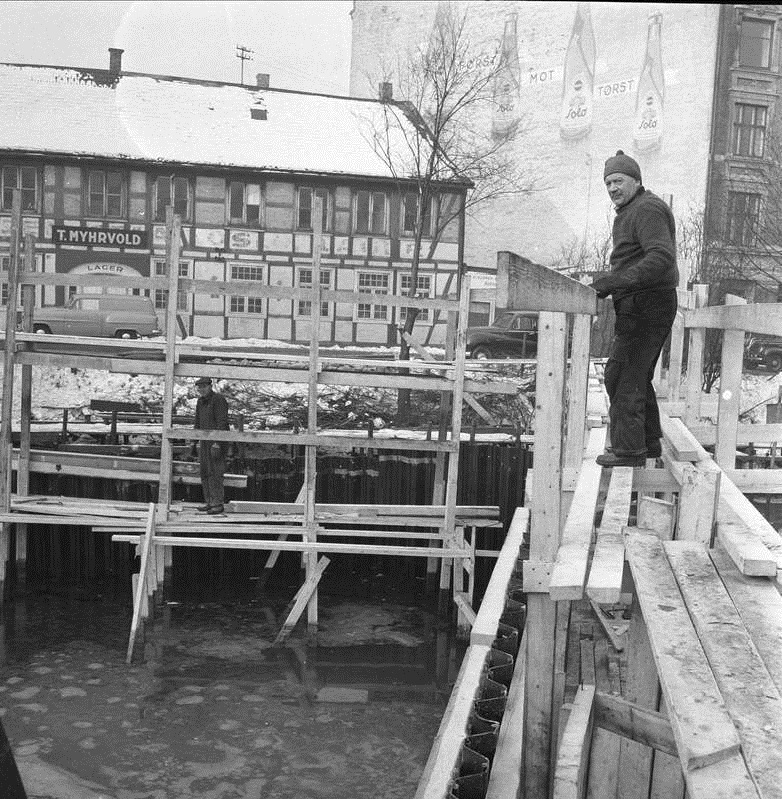
From Oslo: On the wall is an old advertisement for Solo, saying "First against thirst"

Solo is an orange-flavoured soft drink, owned by the Norwegian companies Ringnes, Oskar Sylte, and Mack. The recipe was originally Spanish, and brought to the CEO of Tønsberg Bryggeri, Theodor W. Holmsen by Torleif Gulliksrud in 1934. Solo quickly became Norway's most popular soft drink, and until the 1960s was bigger than Coca-Cola in Norway. In 1999, Pepsi passed Solo in market share, leaving Solo as third most popular.

Solo also has a history in Sweden and is today produced by Vasa Bryggeri in Sundsvall.

As of 2005, Solo has a seven percent share of the Norwegian soft drink market. Variants of the original Solo include Solo Super (no added sugar), Solo Sunset and Solrik (juice).
