= Sun Drop =

Soft drink

- Type: Citrus soda
- Manufacturer: Keurig Dr Pepper
- Origin: Missouri, United States
- Introduced: 1949; 77 years ago
- Ingredients: Orange juice
- Variants: Diet Sun Drop; Caffeine-Free Sun Drop; Caffeine-Free Diet Sun Drop; Cherry Lemon Sun Drop; Diet Cherry Lemon Sun Drop
- Website: www.sundrop.com

Sun Drop is a citrus-flavored soft drink produced by Keurig Dr Pepper with a yellowish-green color. Among soft drinks, it is known for its high caffeine content. Orange juice concentrate is an ingredient in the drink. Bottled Sun Drop uses sugar cane, which contains some pulp, giving Sun Drop its distinct flavor and appearance. Sun Drop competes primarily against the Coca-Cola Company's Mello Yello and PepsiCo's Mountain Dew.

== History ==
Sun Drop was developed in Missouri by Charles Lazier, a salesman of beverage concentrates. While riding around town in the family car, Lazier quickly scribbled a recipe for a new soft drink on a small piece of paper which he handed to his son, Charles Jr. The younger Lazier worked as a lab technician at his father’s plant, and soon began work on the formula. Two years later, in 1951, Sun Drop Cola debuted at the American Bottlers of Carbonated Beverages Conference in Washington, D.C. Gastonia, North Carolina, was the headquarters for bottling Sun Drop for over 50 years until 2016.

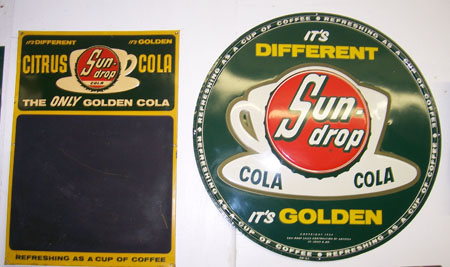
Sundrop advertising signs from the 1950s

The drink was marketed in several Southern states under names such as "Sundrop Golden Cola" or "Golden Girl Cola." The brand was acquired and standardized by Crush International in 1970. Crush International was purchased by Procter & Gamble in 1980, which sold its soft drinks holdings to Cadbury Schweppes plc in 1989. Cadbury Schweppes demerged in 2008, with its beverage unit becoming Keurig Dr Pepper, which currently produces Sun Drop.

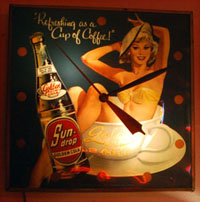
Sundrop Golden Girl Cola clock

Prior to the sale to Cadbury Schweppes, Procter & Gamble introduced several new Sun Drop flavors in 1985, including a reformulated Diet Sun Drop brand using aspartame instead of saccharin. A third brand, Cherry-Lemon Sun Drop, was introduced that same year. In February 2002, the brand introduced Caffeine-Free Sun Drop to the portfolio after the company received numerous requests from loyal consumers for a caffeine-free version of their favorite citrus soft drink. A diet variant of Cherry Lemon Sun Drop was introduced 2014.

Sun Drop has maintained popularity in many parts of the Southern United States, especially in Kentucky, Tennessee, North Carolina and parts of the Midwestern United States, including Wisconsin and western Minnesota. Similar to other regional drinks with a cult following, fans outside bottling areas have been known to pay large amounts to have the drink shipped to them. Families have sent it to U.S. soldiers serving in Afghanistan.

Sun Drop is sometimes used as a mixer for drinks with hard liquor.

Sun Drop is the official drink of the nationally recognized "Fancy Farm Picnic" in Fancy Farm, Kentucky.

In the 1970s until the early 1990s, the drink was promoted in the American South by NASCAR driver Dale Earnhardt. His son Dale Earnhardt Jr. was also sponsored by Sun Drop in the late model series in 1993; they will reunite for the CARS Tour race at North Wilkesboro Speedway on August 31, 2022.

The soft drink was a leading sponsor for racecar driver Ryan Hunter-Reay in the IndyCar Series for Andretti Autosport from 2011 to 2013.

Carolina Beverage Corp. bought Sun Drop Bottling Co. of Concord effective December 1, 2016. The Concord, North Carolina, plant closed.

== Expansion ==
Keurig Dr Pepper distributed Sun Drop nationwide beginning in 2011, with a new campaign that features an updated web site, a Facebook page, and a promotional deal with MTV. The Sun Drop marketing plan is a component of Keurig Dr Pepper's efforts to expand its non-cola soda sales and is targeting drinkers of PepsiCo's Mountain Dew brand of soft drinks in the United States. Sun Drop's expansion occurred several months after Coca-Cola brought its high-caffeine citrus drink Mello Yello nationwide.

Dr Pepper Snapple entered into an agreement with Scratch, MTV's marketing agency. Scratch will develop new Sun Drop advertising and branding, including a new design for the can. MTV will also feature Sun Drop in programming, including on its reality series The Real World.

== Varieties ==
There are six varieties of the drink:

- Sun Drop (green can, green label, 64 mg caffeine per 12 fl oz can; 105 mg caffeine per 20 fl oz bottle)
- Diet Sun Drop (white can, white label, 68 mg caffeine per 12 fl oz can; 114 mg caffeine per 20 fl oz bottle)
- Caffeine-Free Sun Drop
- Caffeine-Free Diet Sun Drop
- Cherry Lemon Sun Drop (64 mg caffeine)
- Diet Cherry Lemon Sun Drop

Sun Drop that is bottled in glass bottles is typically sweetened with sugar instead of corn syrup, providing a slightly different taste.
